= Elton John =

British musician and songwriter (born 1947)

Sir Elton John CH CBE
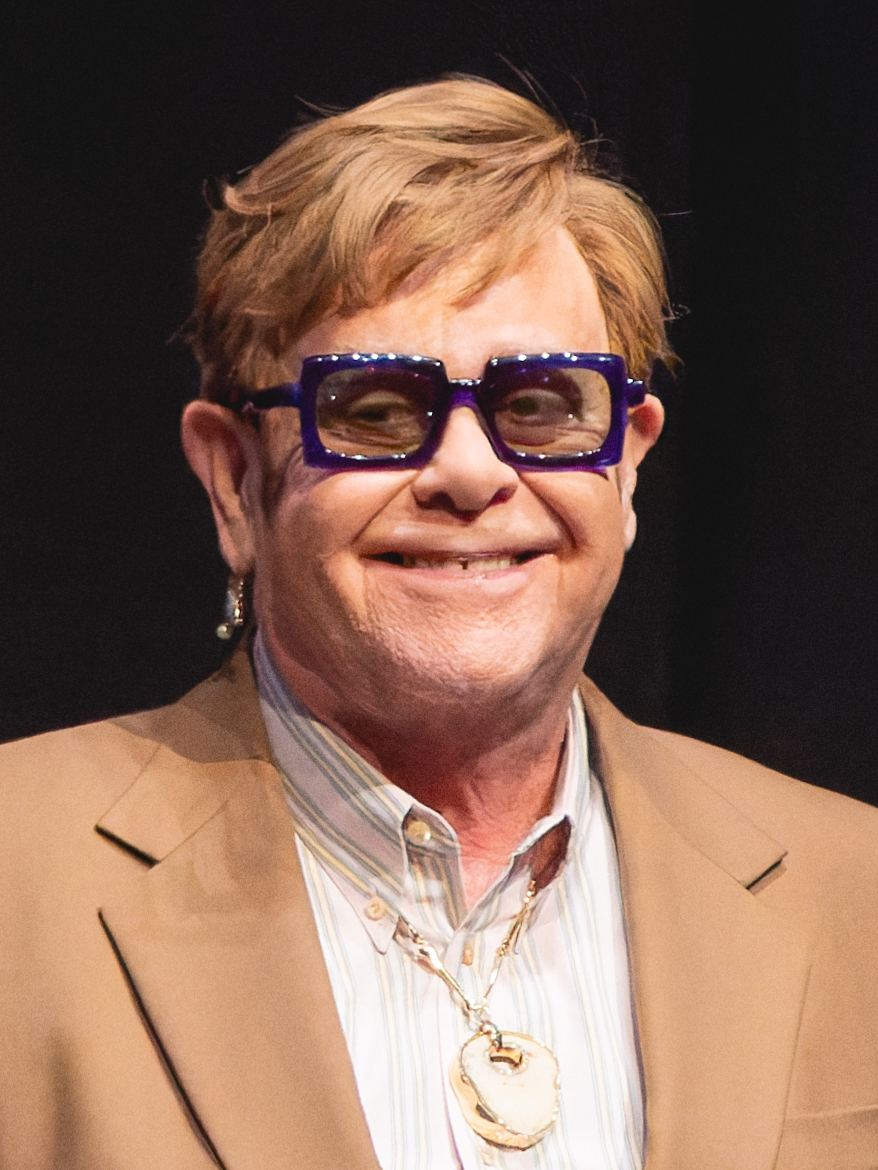
- John in 2024
- Born: Reginald Kenneth Dwight; 25 March 1947 (age 79); Pinner, Middlesex, England
- Education: Royal Academy of Music
- Occupations: Singer; composer; pianist
- Years active: 1962–present
- Works: Albums; singles; songs; videography; concerts
- Spouses: Renate Blauel (m. 1984; div. 1988) David Furnish (m. 2014)
- Children: 2
- Awards: Full list
- Musical career
- Genres: Rock; pop
- Instruments: Vocals; piano; keyboards
- Labels: Philips; Congress; DJM; Uni; Paramount; MCA; Geffen; Rocket; Island; Mercury; Island Def Jam; Interscope; Virgin EMI; EMI
- Member of: Elton John Band
- Formerly of: Bluesology
- Website: eltonjohn.com

Sir Elton Hercules John (born Reginald Kenneth Dwight, 25 March 1947) is a British singer, composer and pianist. An influential figure in popular culture, he is known for his flamboyant fashion, showmanship and songwriting partnership with the lyricist Bernie Taupin. With over 300 million records sold worldwide, he is one of the best-selling music artists of all time. An EGOT winner, John's accolades include five Grammy Awards, two Academy Awards, a Primetime Emmy Award, a Tony Award, two Golden Globe Awards, a Laurence Olivier Award and the Kennedy Center Honors.

John learnt to play piano at an early age, winning a scholarship to the Royal Academy of Music. In the 1960s he formed the blues band Bluesology, wrote songs for other artists alongside Taupin, and worked as a session musician, before releasing his debut album, Empty Sky (1969). Throughout the next six decades, John cemented his status as a cultural icon with 32 studio albums, including Honky Château (1972), Goodbye Yellow Brick Road (1973), Rock of the Westies (1975), Sleeping with the Past (1989), The One (1992), Songs from the West Coast (2001), The Diving Board (2013) and The Lockdown Sessions (2021). He has also had success in musical films and theatre, composing music for The Lion King (1994), Aida (2000) and Billy Elliot the Musical (2005). John's final tour, Farewell Yellow Brick Road (2018–2023), became the highest-grossing tour ever at the time. His life and career were dramatised in the 2019 biographical film Rocketman.

John is an HIV/AIDS charity fundraiser and has been involved in the fight against AIDS since the late 1980s. In 1992 he established the Elton John AIDS Foundation, which has raised over £300 million since its inception, and a year later he began hosting his annual AIDS Foundation Academy Awards Party, which has since become one of the biggest high-profile Oscars parties in the Hollywood film industry. John was the chairman and director of Watford Football Club from 1976 to 1987, and again from 1997 to 2002, and is an honorary life president of the club. From the late 1970s to the late 1980s, John developed a severe addiction to drugs and alcohol, but has been clean and sober since 1990. In 2005 he entered a civil partnership with his long-term partner, the Canadian filmmaker David Furnish. They married in 2014, when same-sex marriage was legalised in England and Wales.

John has had nine number-one singles on the UK singles chart and the US Billboard Hot 100, as well as seven consecutive number-one albums on the US Billboard 200. He is the most successful solo artist in the history of the US Billboard charts, and was the first solo artist with UK top 10 singles across six decades. His tribute single to Diana, Princess of Wales, "Candle in the Wind 1997", a rewritten version of his 1974 single, is the best-selling chart single of all time. John was inducted into the Songwriters Hall of Fame and the Rock and Roll Hall of Fame, and is a fellow of The Ivors Academy. He was appointed Knight Bachelor for services to music and charity in 1998 and was appointed a member of the Order of the Companions of Honour in 2020. Rolling Stone ranked him among the greatest artists, greatest singers and greatest songwriters of all time.

== Early life and education ==
Reginald Kenneth Dwight was born on 25 March 1947 in Pinner, Middlesex (now part of the London Borough of Harrow), the eldest child of Stanley Dwight (1925–1991) and only child of Sheila Eileen (née Harris; 1925–2017), who had married in 1945. He was raised in a council house in Pinner where his maternal grandparents lived. When he was six, the family moved to a nearby semi-detached house. He was educated at Pinner Wood Junior School, Reddiford School and Pinner County Grammar School, until he was 17, when he left just before his A-Level examinations to pursue a career in music.

When John began to consider a career in music seriously, his father, who served in the Royal Air Force, tried to steer him toward a more conventional career, such as banking. John has said that his wild stage costumes and performances were his way of letting go after a restrictive childhood. Both his parents were musically inclined, his father having been a trumpet player with the Bob Millar Band, a semi-professional big band that played at military dances. The Dwights were keen record buyers, exposing John to the popular singers and musicians of the day. John started playing his grandmother's piano as a young boy, and within a year his mother heard him picking out Émile Waldteufel's "The Skater's Waltz" by ear. After performing at parties and family gatherings, at age seven, he began formal piano lessons. He showed musical aptitude at school, including the ability to compose melodies, and garnered attention for playing like Jerry Lee Lewis at school functions. At age 11, he won a junior scholarship to the Royal Academy of Music. According to one of his instructors, John promptly played back, like a "gramophone record", a four-page piece by George Frideric Handel after hearing it for the first time.

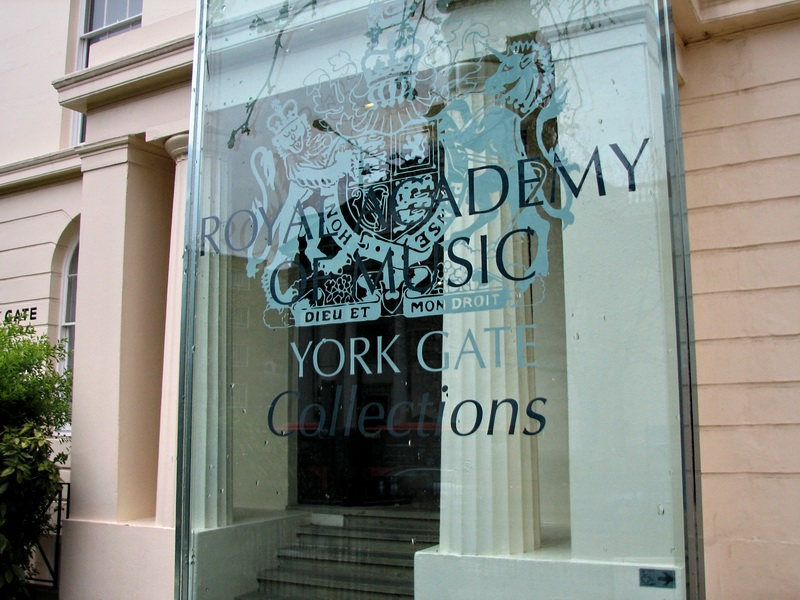
Elton John, known then as Reg Dwight, studied at the Royal Academy of Music in London for five years.

For the next five years, John attended Saturday classes at the academy in Central London, and he has said he enjoyed playing Frédéric Chopin and Johann Sebastian Bach and singing in the choir during Saturday classes, but that he was not otherwise a diligent classical student. "I kind of resented going to the Academy," he said. "I was one of those children who could just about get away without practising and still pass, scrape through the grades." He has said that he would sometimes skip classes and ride around on the London Underground. Several instructors have attested that he was a "model student", and during the last few years he took lessons from a private tutor in addition to his classes at the academy. He left the academy before taking the final exams.

John's mother, though strict with her son, was more outgoing than her husband, and something of a free spirit. With Stanley Dwight uninterested in his son and often absent, John was raised primarily by his mother and maternal grandmother. When his father was home, the Dwights had vehement arguments that greatly distressed John. When he was 14, they divorced. His mother then married a local painter, Fred Farebrother, a caring and supportive stepfather whom John affectionately called "Derf", "Fred" backward. They moved into flat No. 3A in an eight-unit apartment building called Frome Court, not far from both previous homes. There John wrote the songs that launched his career as a rock star. He lived there until he had four albums, simultaneously, in the American Top 40.

== Career ==
=== 1962–1969: Pub pianist to staff songwriter ===
At age 15, with his mother's and stepfather's help, John was hired as a pianist at a nearby pub, the Northwood Hills Hotel, playing Thursday to Sunday nights. Known simply as "Reggie", he played a range of popular standards, including songs by Jim Reeves and Ray Charles, as well as his own songs. A stint with a short-lived group called the Corvettes rounded out his time. Although normal-sighted as a teenager, John began wearing horn-rimmed glasses to imitate Buddy Holly.

In 1962, John and some friends formed a band named Bluesology. By day, he ran errands for a music publishing company; he divided his nights between solo gigs at a London hotel bar and working with Bluesology. By the mid-1960s, Bluesology were backing touring American soul and R&B musicians such as the Isley Brothers, Major Lance and Patti LaBelle and the Bluebelles. In 1966 the band became Long John Baldry's supporting band and played 16 times at the Marquee Club.

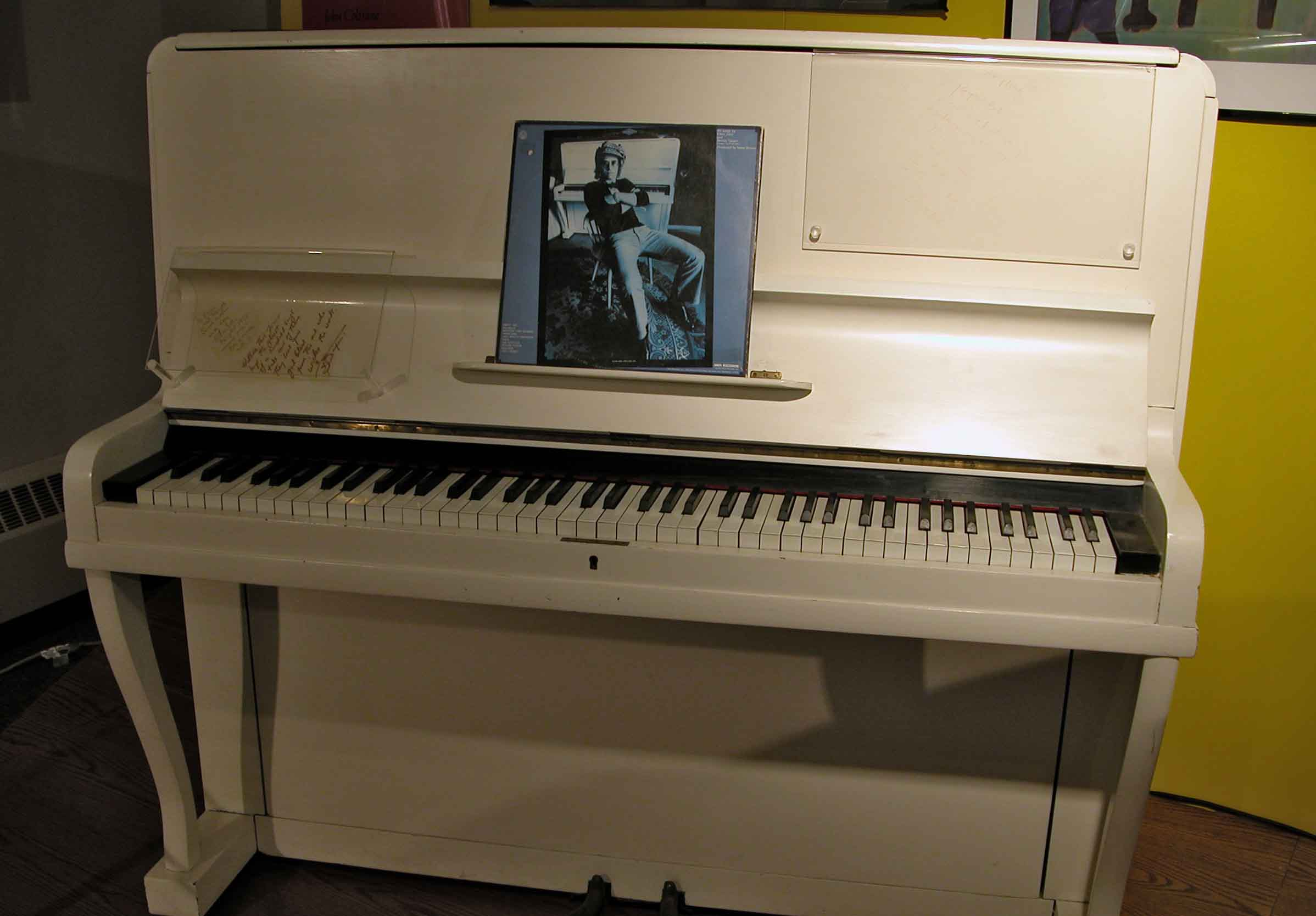
The 1910 piano on which John composed his first five albums

In 1967 John answered an advertisement in the British music paper New Musical Express, placed by Ray Williams, then the A&R manager for Liberty Records. At their first meeting, Williams gave John an unopened envelope of lyrics written by Bernie Taupin, who had answered the same ad. John wrote music for the lyrics and then sent it to Taupin, which began their decades-long partnership that still continues. When the two first met in 1967, they recorded the first John/Taupin song, "Scarecrow". Six months later, John began going by the name Elton John in homage to two members of Bluesology: the saxophonist Elton Dean and the vocalist Long John Baldry. He legally changed his name to Elton Hercules John on 7 January 1972. "Hercules" came from the name of a horse in British sitcom Steptoe and Son, of which John was a big fan.

The team of John and Taupin joined Dick James's DJM Records as staff songwriters in 1968, and over the next two years wrote material for various artists, among them Roger Cook and Lulu. Taupin would write a batch of lyrics in under an hour and give it to John, who would write music for each of them in half an hour, disposing of the lyrics if he could not come up with anything quickly. For two years they wrote easy-listening tunes for James to peddle to singers. Their early output included a contender for the UK entry for the Eurovision Song Contest 1969, for Lulu, called "I Can't Go On (Living Without You)". It came sixth of six songs. In 1969, John provided piano for Roger Hodgson on his first released single, "Mr. Boyd" by Argosy, a quartet that was completed by Caleb Quaye and Nigel Olsson.

=== 1969–1973: Empty Sky to Goodbye Yellow Brick Road ===
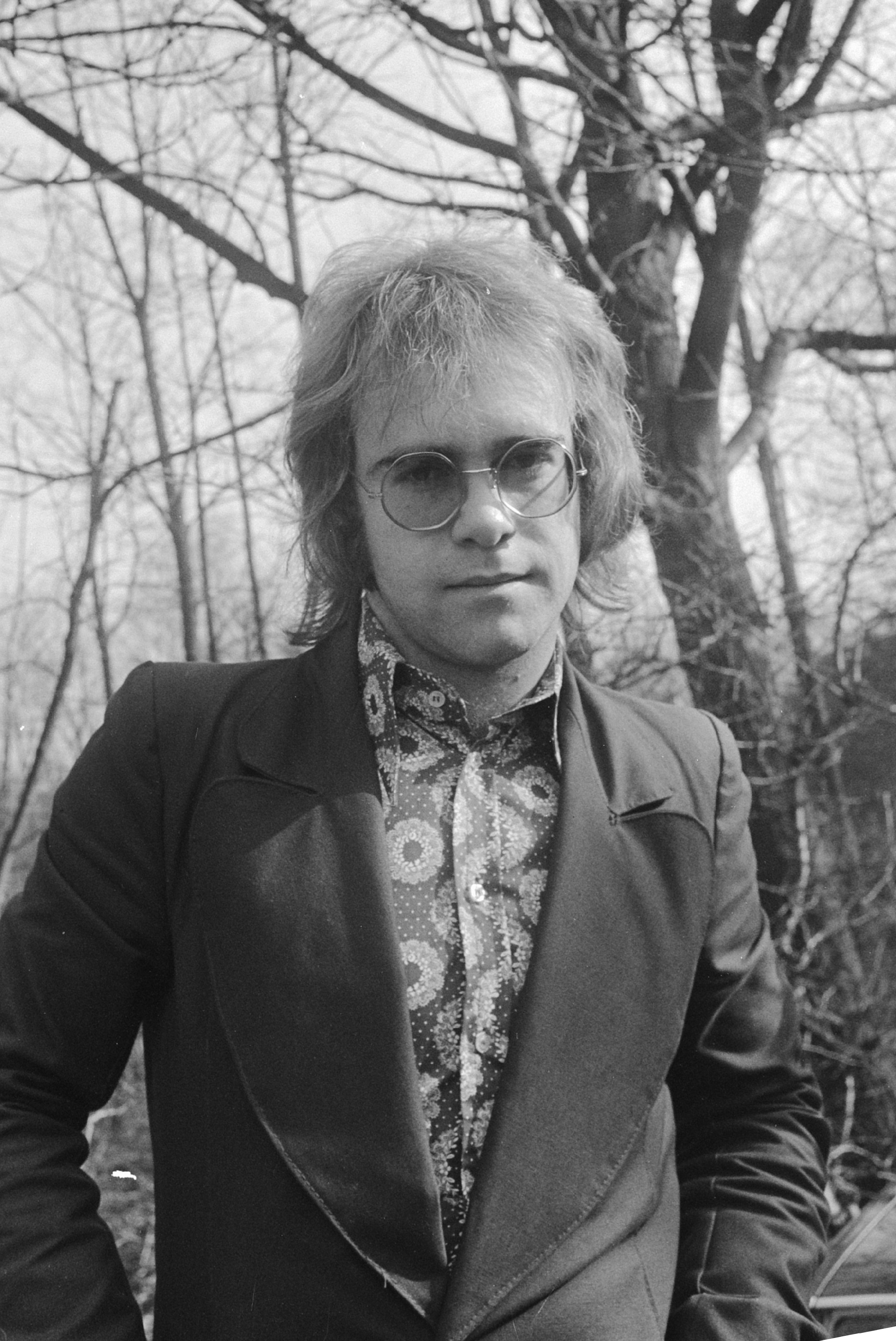
John in 1971

On the advice of music publisher Steve Brown, John and Taupin began writing more complex songs for John to record for DJM. The first was the single "I've Been Loving You" (1968), produced by Caleb Quaye, Bluesology's former guitarist. In 1969, with Quaye, the drummer Roger Pope and the bassist Tony Murray, John recorded another single, "Lady Samantha", and an album, Empty Sky. For their follow-up album, Elton John, John and Taupin enlisted Gus Dudgeon as producer and Paul Buckmaster as musical arranger.

Elton John was released in April 1970 on DJM Records/Pye Records in the UK and Uni Records in the US, and established the formula for subsequent albums: gospel-chorded rockers and poignant ballads. The album's first single, "Border Song", peaked at 92 on the Billboard Hot 100. The second, "Your Song", reached number seven in the UK Singles Chart and number eight in the US, becoming John's first hit single as a singer. The album soon became his first hit album, reaching number four on the US Billboard 200 and number five on the UK Albums Chart.

Backed by the former Spencer Davis Group rhythm section, drummer Nigel Olsson and bassist Dee Murray, John's first American concert took place at the Troubadour in Los Angeles, California, on 25 August 1970, and was a success. The concept album Tumbleweed Connection was released in October 1970 and reached number two in the UK and number five in the US. The live album 17-11-70 (titled 11–17–70 in the US) was recorded at a live show aired from A&R Studios on WABC-FM in New York City. Sales of the live album took a blow in the US when an east-coast bootlegger released the performance several weeks before the official album, including all 60 minutes of the aircast, not just the 40 minutes selected by Dick James Music.

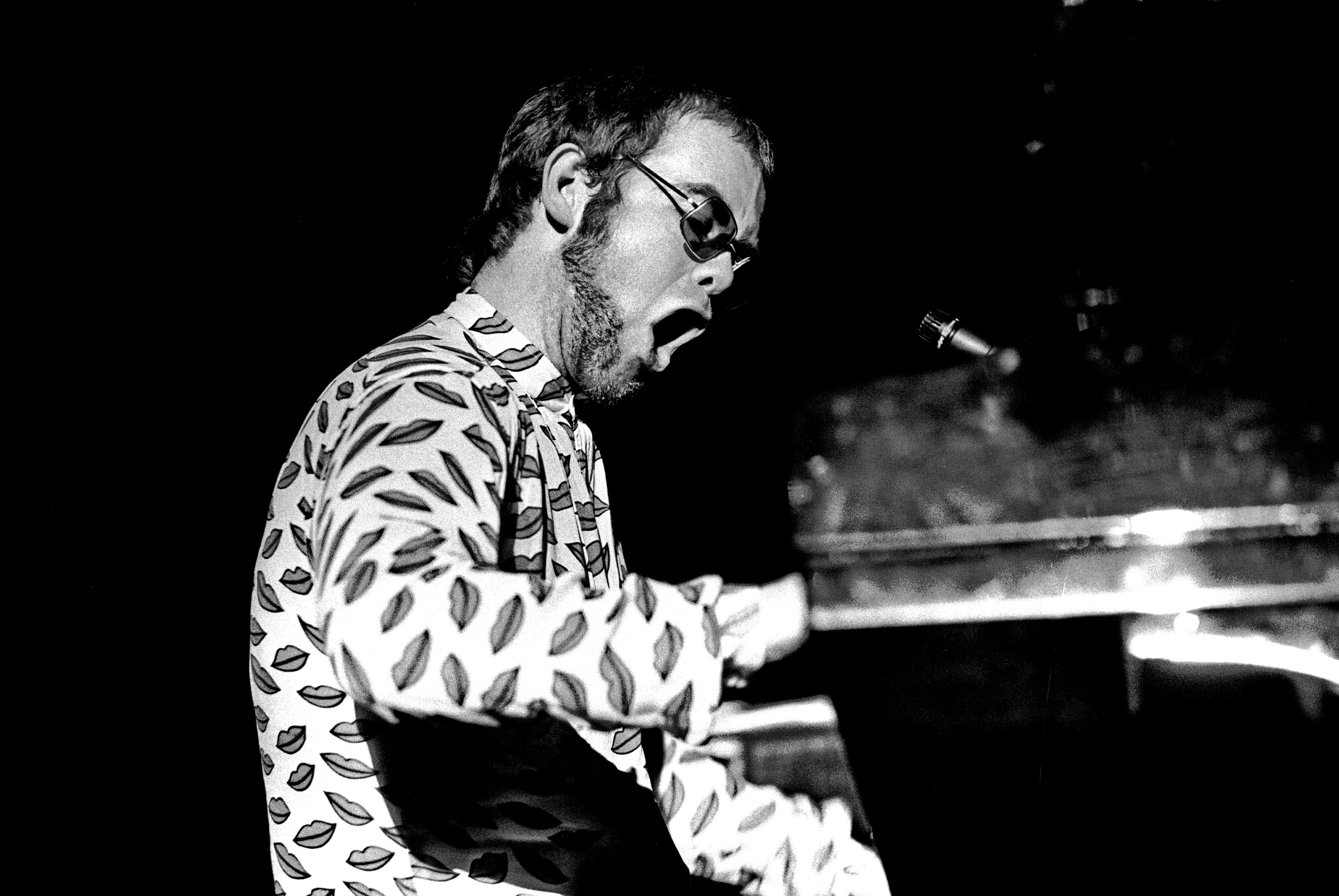
John at the Musikhalle Hamburg, in March 1972

John and Taupin wrote the soundtrack to the 1971 film Friends and the album Madman Across the Water, which reached number eight in the US and included the hit songs "Levon" and the album's opening track, "Tiny Dancer". In 1972 Davey Johnstone joined the Elton John Band on guitar and backing vocals. Released in 1972, Honky Château became John's first US number-one album, spending five weeks at the top of the Billboard 200, and began a streak of seven consecutive US number-one albums. The album reached number two in the UK, and spawned the hit singles "Rocket Man" and "Honky Cat".

In 1972 John performed at the Royal Variety Performance, where he was upstaged by the dancing of Larry Smith, the drummer with the Bonzo Dog Doo-Dah Band. Smith was invited to join John's second US tour; Smith later said: "I suggested adding in various other bizarre elements like me doing "Singin' in the Rain" as a song and dance act with Elton playing piano. Kubrick's Clockwork Orange film had recently featured that song. Plus I designed crazy, over-the-top costumes and giant stage sets – known as 'Legstravaganzas'. Elton loved all of it."

The pop album Don't Shoot Me I'm Only the Piano Player came out at the start of 1973 and reached number one in the UK, the US, and Australia, among other countries. The album produced the hits "Crocodile Rock", his first US Billboard Hot 100 number one, and "Daniel", which reached number two in the US and number four in the UK. The album and "Crocodile Rock" were respectively the first album and single on the consolidated MCA Records label in the US, replacing MCA's other labels, including Uni.

Goodbye Yellow Brick Road, a double-album released in October 1973, gained instant critical acclaim and topped the chart on both sides of the Atlantic, remaining at number one for two months. It also temporarily established John as a glam rock star. It contained the US number 1 "Bennie and the Jets", along with the hits "Goodbye Yellow Brick Road", "Candle in the Wind" and "Saturday Night's Alright for Fighting", as well as live favourites "Funeral for a Friend/Love Lies Bleeding" and "Harmony".

=== 1974–1980: The Rocket Record Company to 21 at 33 ===
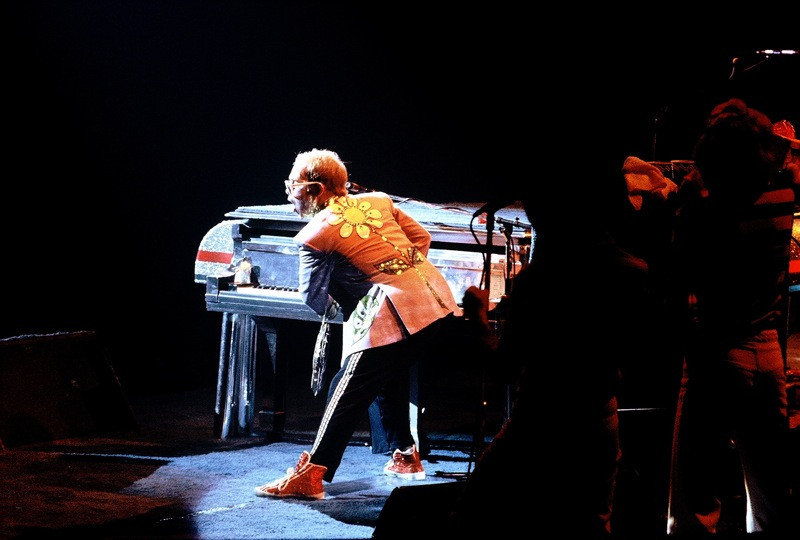
John on the piano during a live performance in 1975

John formed his own record label, The Rocket Record Company (distributed in the US by MCA and initially by Island in the UK), and signed acts to it—notably Neil Sedaka (John sang background vocals on Sedaka's "Bad Blood") and Kiki Dee, in whom he took a personal interest. Rather than releasing his own records through The Rocket Record Company, John signed an US$8 million contract with MCA Records. Upon the signing of the deal in 1974, MCA reportedly secured a $25 million insurance policy on his life. In 1974 MCA released Elton John's Greatest Hits, a UK and US number one that is certified Diamond by the RIAA for US sales of 17 million copies.

In 1974 John collaborated with John Lennon on his cover of the Beatles' "Lucy in the Sky with Diamonds", the B-side of which was Lennon's "One Day at a Time". It was number 1 for two weeks in the US. In return, John was featured on "Whatever Gets You Thru the Night" on Lennon's album Walls and Bridges. Later that year, in Lennon's last major live performance, the pair performed these two number-one hits, along with the Beatles' "I Saw Her Standing There", at Madison Square Garden in New York City. Lennon made the rare stage appearance with John and his band to keep the promise he had made that he would appear on stage with him if "Whatever Gets You Thru The Night" became a US number-one single. Caribou was released in 1974, becoming John's third number one in the UK and topping the charts in the US, Canada and Australia. Reportedly recorded in two weeks between live appearances, it featured "The Bitch Is Back" and "Don't Let the Sun Go Down on Me". "Step into Christmas" was released as a stand-alone single in November 1973, and appears in the album's 1995 remastered reissue.

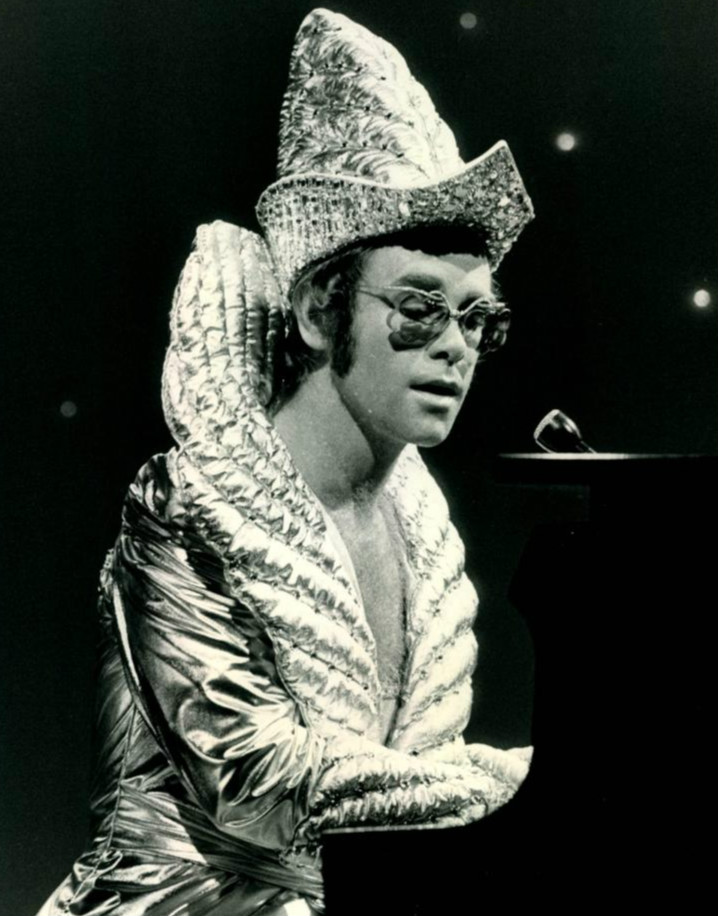
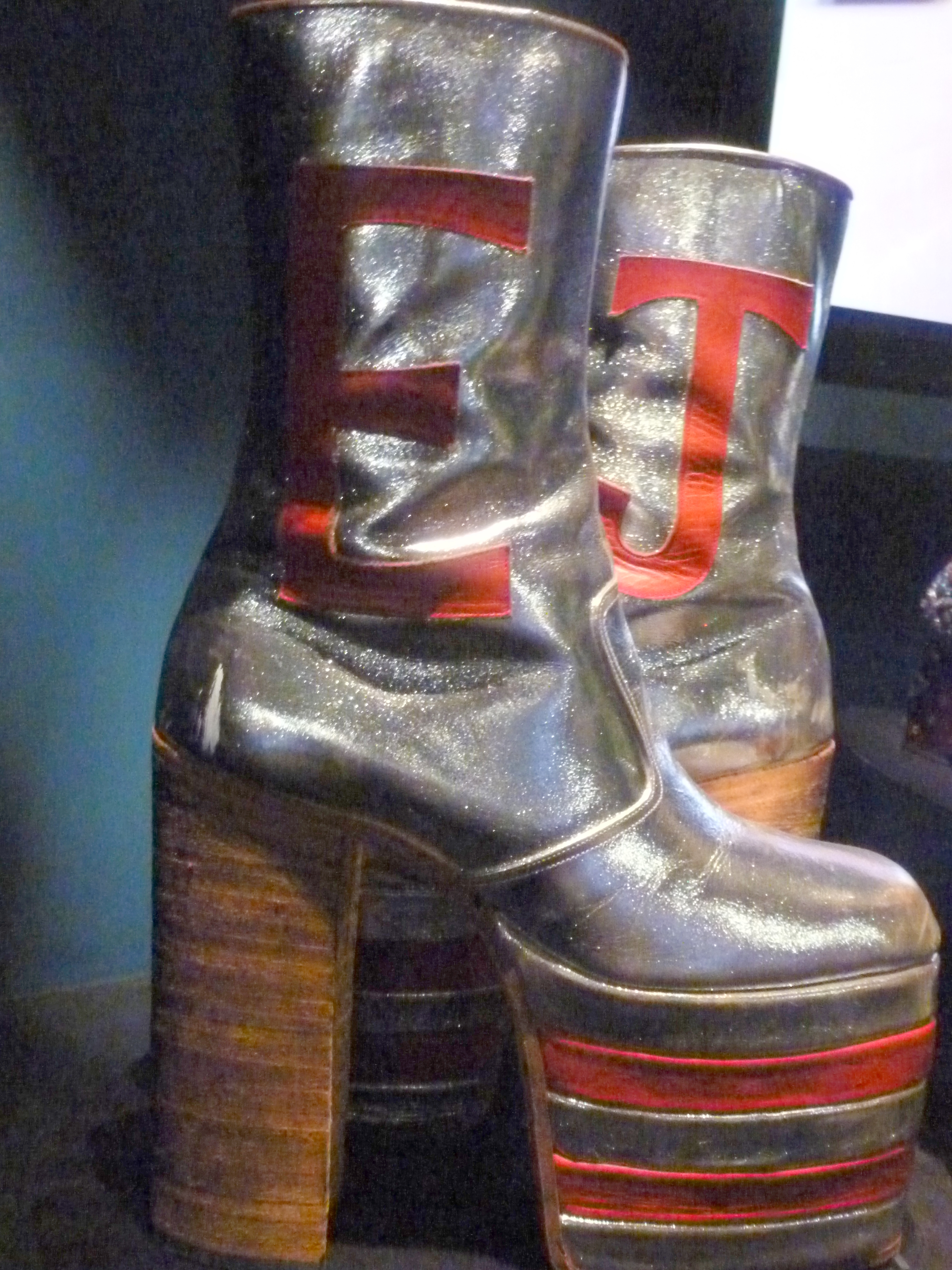
Influenced by the glam rock scene in the UK, John (pictured left on the Cher show) often wore elaborate stage costumes, including platform boots (right).

Pete Townshend of the Who asked John to play the "Local Lad" in the 1975 film adaptation of the rock opera Tommy, and to perform the song "Pinball Wizard". Drawing on power chords, John's version was recorded and used in the movie. The song charted at number 7 in the UK. John, who had adopted a glam aesthetic on stage, would later state glam rock icon Marc Bolan "had a great effect on me."

The 1975 autobiographical album Captain Fantastic and the Brown Dirt Cowboy debuted at number one in the US, the first album to do so, and stayed there for seven weeks. John revealed his previously ambiguous personality on the album, with Taupin's lyrics describing their early days as struggling songwriters and musicians in London. The lyrics and accompanying photo booklet are infused with a specific sense of place and time that is otherwise rare in his music. The hit single from this album, "Someone Saved My Life Tonight", captured an early turning point in John's life. The album's release signalled the end of the Elton John Band, as an unhappy and overworked John dismissed Olsson and Murray.

According to Circus, a spokesman for John's manager John Reid said the decision was reached mutually via phone while John was in Australia promoting Tommy. Davey Johnstone and Ray Cooper were retained, Quaye and Roger Pope returned, and the new bassist was Kenny Passarelli; this rhythm section provided a heavier backbeat. James Newton Howard joined to arrange in the studio and to play keyboards. In June 1975 John introduced the line-up at Wembley Stadium in London.

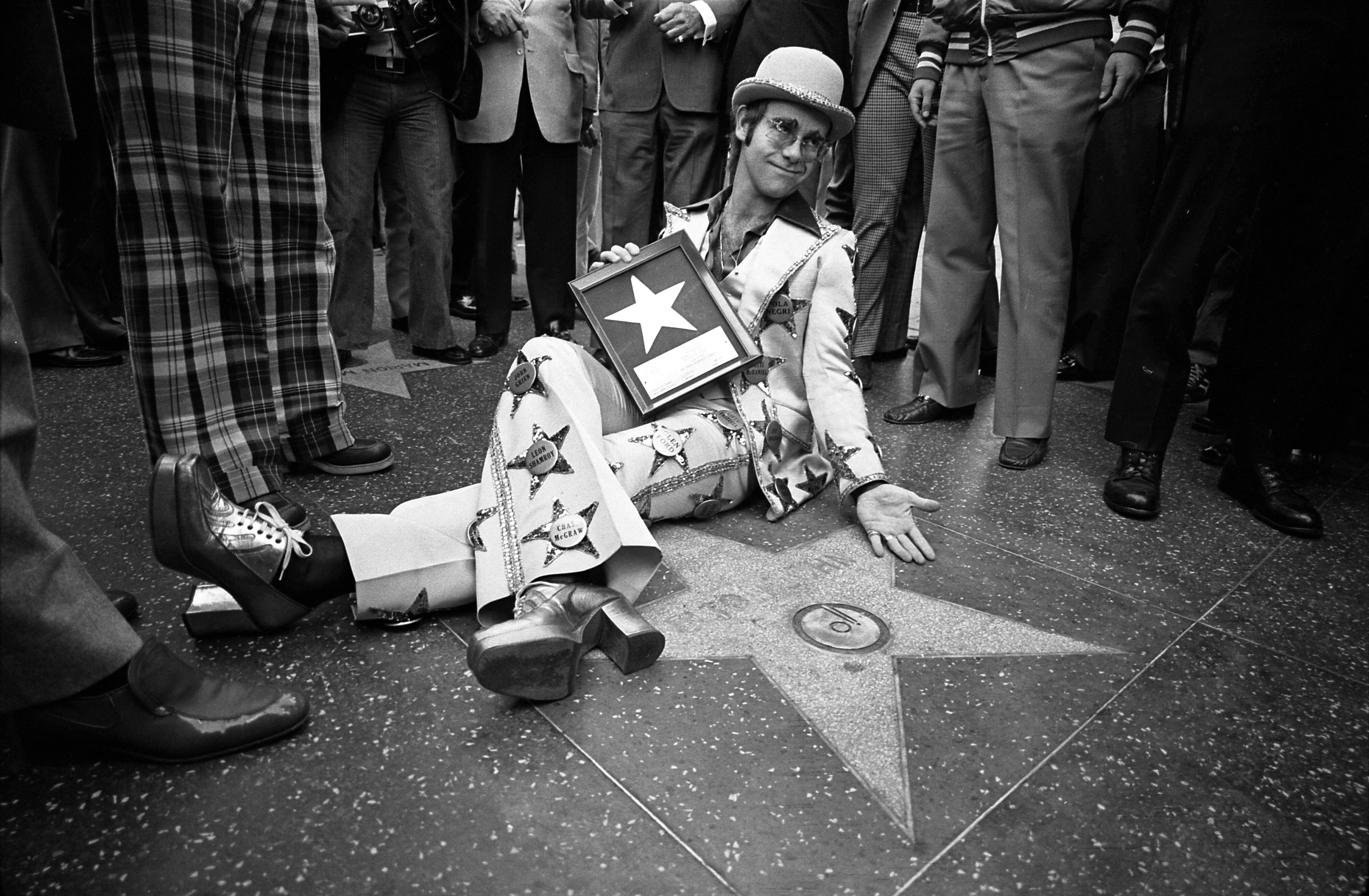
John receiving his star on the Hollywood Walk of Fame in 1975

The rock-oriented Rock of the Westies entered the US albums chart at number 1, as had Captain Fantastic and the Brown Dirt Cowboy, a previously unattained feat. John's stage wardrobe now included ostrich feathers, $5,000 spectacles that spelled his name in lights, and costumes such as the Statue of Liberty, Donald Duck, and Wolfgang Amadeus Mozart. In 1975 he received a star on the Hollywood Walk of Fame. The album features his fifth US number-one single, "Island Girl". To celebrate five years since he had first appeared at the venue, in 1975 John played a two-night, four-show stand at the Troubadour. With seating limited to fewer than 500 attendees per show, tickets were distributed through a postcard lottery system, with each selected individual eligible to purchase two tickets. All attendees received a hardbound "yearbook" documenting the band's history. That year, he also played piano on Kevin Ayers's Sweet Deceiver and was among the first and few white artists to appear on the African-American television series Soul Train.

On 9 August 1975 John was named the outstanding rock personality of the year at the first annual Rock Music Awards in Santa Monica, California, US. After a botched suicide attempt the day before, John performed at Dodger Stadium in Los Angeles for two nights in a row on October 25 and 26. These shows are considered among the most successful of his career, and featured his most enduring stage costume; a sequined Dodger baseball uniform designed by Bob Mackie.

In May 1976 the live album Here and There was released, followed in October by the album Blue Moves, which contained the single "Sorry Seems to Be the Hardest Word". His biggest success in 1976 was "Don't Go Breaking My Heart", a duet with Kiki Dee that topped a number of charts, including the UK, the US, Australia, France and Canada.

In addition to being the most commercially successful period of John's career, the years 1970 to 1976 are also widely regarded as his critical peak. Between 1972 and 1975, he achieved seven consecutive number-one albums in the United States, a feat that had not been accomplished prior to that time. All six of his albums to make Rolling Stone's 2003 list of "The 500 Greatest Albums of All Time" are from this period, with Goodbye Yellow Brick Road ranked highest at number 91. Between 1972 and 1976 he also had six singles reach number one on the Billboard Hot 100.

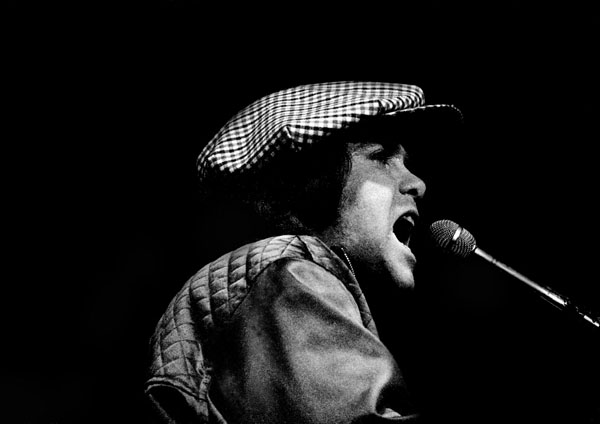
John performing live in Dublin with Ray Cooper in 1979

In November 1977, John announced he was retiring from performing; Taupin began collaborating with others. Now producing only one album a year, John issued A Single Man in 1978, with a new lyricist, Gary Osborne; the album produced no singles that made the top 20 in the US, but the two singles from the album released in the UK, "Part-Time Love" and "Song for Guy", both made the top 20 there, with the latter reaching the top 5. In 1979, accompanied by Ray Cooper, John became one of the first Western artists to tour the Soviet Union and Israel. John returned to the US top ten with "Mama Can't Buy You Love" (number 9), a song MCA rejected in 1977, recorded with the American soul producer Thom Bell. John said Bell was the first person to give him voice lessons and encouraged him to sing in a lower register.

A disco-influenced album, Victim of Love, was poorly received. In 1979 John and Taupin reunited, although they did not collaborate on a full album until 1983's Too Low For Zero. 21 at 33, released in 1980, was a significant career boost, aided by his biggest hit in four years, "Little Jeannie" (number 3 US), with the lyrics by Gary Osborne. In May 1979 John played eight concerts in the Soviet Union; four dates in Leningrad (now Saint Petersburg) and four in Moscow. At the same time, John collaborated with the French couple France Gall and Michel Berger on the songs "Donner pour donner" and "Les Aveux", released together in 1980 as a single.

=== 1981–1989: The Fox to Sleeping with the Past ===
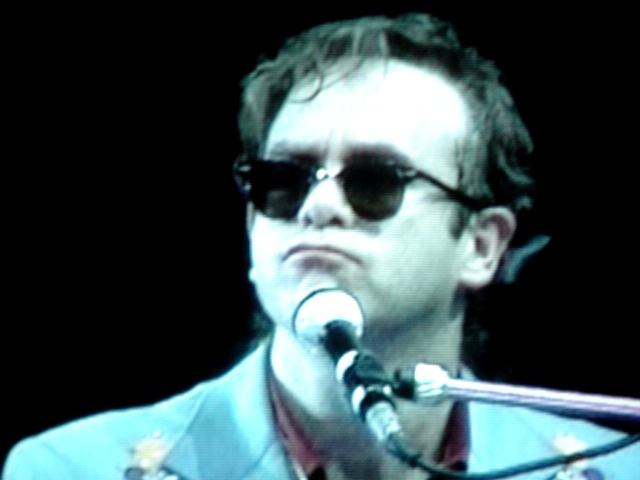
John performing in 1986

John's 1981 album The Fox was recorded during the same sessions as 21 at 33 and included collaborations with Tom Robinson and Judie Tzuke. On 13 September 1980, with Olsson and Murray back in the Elton John Band, and joined by Richie Zito on lead guitar, Tim Renwick on rhythm guitar, and James Newton Howard on keyboards, John performed a free concert to an estimated 400,000 fans on The Great Lawn in Central Park in New York City. He played part of the set dressed as Donald Duck. The album Jump Up! was released in 1982, the biggest hit from which was "Blue Eyes". Also on that album is “Empty Garden (Hey Hey Johnny)”, written in the wake of John Lennon’s 1980 murder.

With the original band members Johnstone, Murray and Olsson together again, John returned to the charts with the 1983 album Too Low for Zero, which included the singles "I'm Still Standing" (No. 4 UK) and "I Guess That's Why They Call It the Blues", the latter of which featured Stevie Wonder on harmonica and reached number four in the US and number five in the UK. In October 1983 John caused controversy when he broke the United Nations' cultural boycott on apartheid-era South Africa by performing at Sun City. He married his close friend and sound engineer, Renate Blauel, on Valentine's Day 1984; the marriage lasted three years. In 1984 he released Breaking Hearts, which featured the song "Sad Songs (Say So Much)", a number five hit in the US and number seven in the UK.

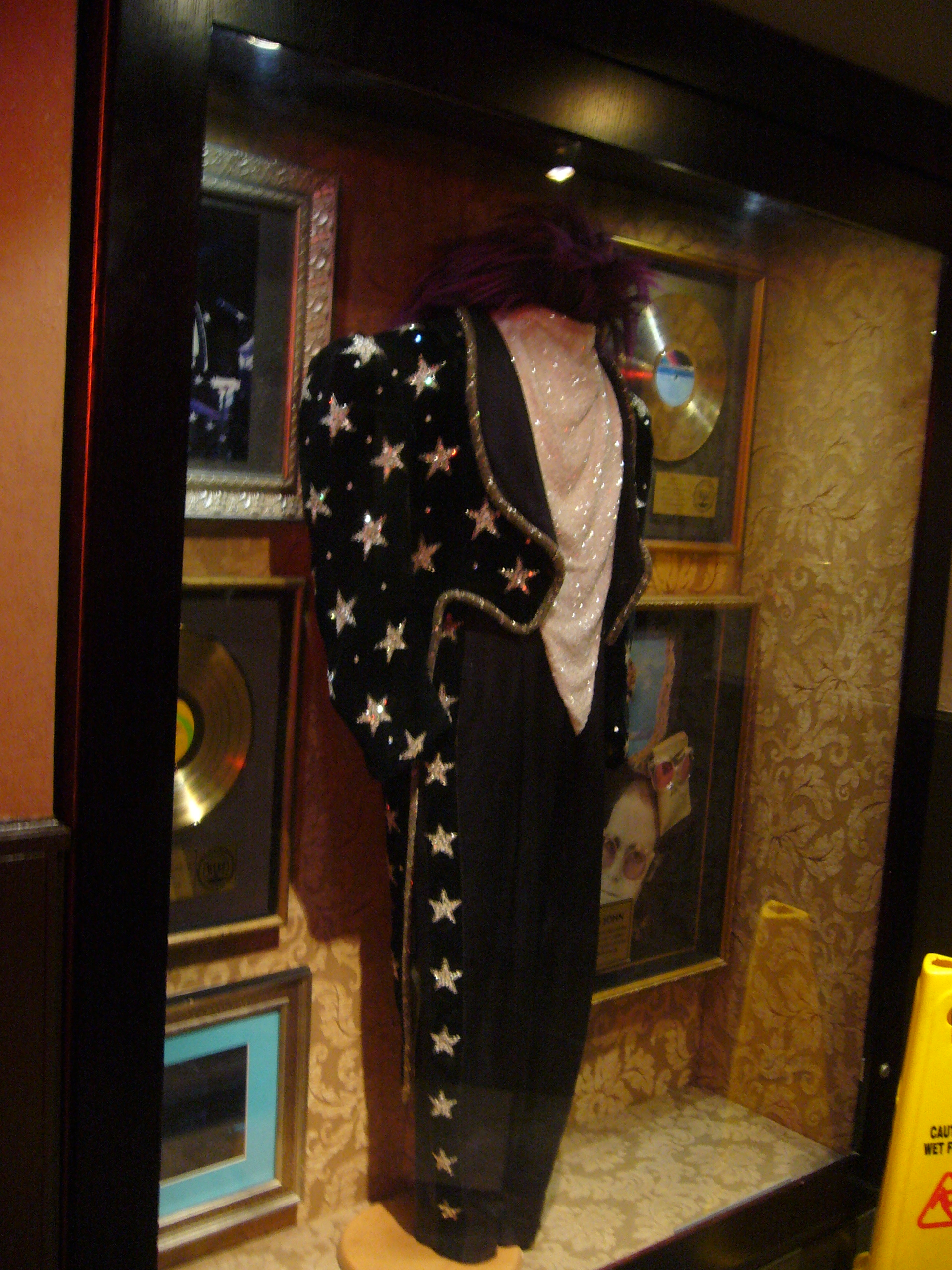
John costume from the 1986 Tour de Force Australian concerts, on display in the Hard Rock Cafe, London

In 1985 John was one of the many performers at Live Aid, held at Wembley Stadium. John performed "Bennie and the Jets" and "Rocket Man" at Live Aid before performing with Kiki Dee for the first time since 1982. He concluded by introducing George Michael (then of Wham!) for "Don't Let the Sun Go Down on Me". John also recorded material with Millie Jackson in 1985. Towards the end of the year, John released "Nikita" from the album Ice on Fire, which had a music video directed by Ken Russell. The song reached number three in the UK and number seven in the US.

John's highest-charting single of the decade was a collaboration with Dionne Warwick, Gladys Knight and Stevie Wonder called "That's What Friends Are For". It reached number one in the US at the beginning of 1986; credited as Dionne and Friends, the song raised funds for HIV/AIDS research. In the same year, a live orchestral version of "Candle in the Wind" reached number six in the US. He also played piano on two tracks on the heavy metal band Saxon's album Rock the Nations.

In 1988 John performed five sold-out shows at Madison Square Garden in New York City, giving him 26 for his career. Netting over $20 million, 2,000 items of John's memorabilia were auctioned off at Sotheby's in London. He also released "I Don't Wanna Go On with You Like That" from the album Reg Strikes Back, the single reaching number two in the US in 1988. His albums continued to sell, but of those released in the latter half of the 1980s, only Reg Strikes Back (number 16, 1988) placed in the top 20 in the US.

=== 1990–1999: "Sacrifice" to Aida ===
In 1990 John achieved his first solo UK number one hit single, with "Sacrifice" (coupled with "Healing Hands") from the previous year's album Sleeping with the Past; it stayed at the top spot for five weeks. The following year, "Basque" won the Grammy for Best Instrumental, and a guest concert appearance at Wembley Arena John made on George Michael's cover of "Don't Let the Sun Go Down on Me" was released as a single and topped the charts in both the UK and the US. At the 1991 Brit Awards in London, John won Best British Male.

In 1992 John released the US number 8 album The One, featuring the hit song "The One". It was his first album recorded entirely sober. As John recalled in 2020, "I was used to making records under the haze of alcohol or drugs, and here I was, 100% sober, so it was tough. But I managed to come up with a good song, which was the title of the record." He also released "Runaway Train", a duet he recorded with his longtime friend Eric Clapton, with whom he played on Clapton's World Tour. John and Taupin then signed a music publishing deal with Warner/Chappell Music for an estimated $39 million over 12 years, including the largest cash advance in music publishing history.

In April 1992 John appeared at the Freddie Mercury Tribute Concert at Wembley Stadium, performing "The Show Must Go On" with the remaining members of Queen, and "Bohemian Rhapsody" with Axl Rose of Guns N' Roses and Queen's remaining members. In September John performed "The One" at the 1992 MTV Video Music Awards and closed the ceremony performing "November Rain" with Guns N' Roses. In 1993 he released Duets, which featured collaborations with 15 artists, including Tammy Wynette and RuPaul. This included a new collaboration with Kiki Dee, "True Love", which reached the Top 10 of the UK charts. In the same year, The Bunbury Tails, a multi-artist charity album, was released, which was the soundtrack to the British animated television series of the same name. "Up The Revolution" was John's track, alongside contributions from George Harrison, the Bee Gees and Eric Clapton. The album was issued briefly, and only in the UK.

"For myself as well as for many others no one has been there more for inspiration than Elton John. When we talk of great rock duos like Jimmy Page and Robert Plant, John (Lennon) and Paul (McCartney), Mick (Jagger) and Keith (Richards), I like to think of Elton John and Bernie Taupin. Also tonight I think that Elton should be honoured for his great work and contribution in the fight against AIDS. And also his bravery in exposing all the triumphs and tragedies of his personal life."

— Axl Rose speech inducting Elton John into the Rock and Roll Hall of Fame.

Along with Tim Rice, John wrote the songs for the 1994 Disney animated film The Lion King. At the 67th Academy Awards, three of the five nominees for the Academy Award for Best Original Song were from The Lion King soundtrack. John won the award for "Can You Feel the Love Tonight". Both that and "Circle of Life" became hits. "Can You Feel the Love Tonight" also won the Grammy Award for Best Male Pop Vocal Performance at the 37th Annual Grammy Awards. The soundtrack for The Lion King remained at the top of the Billboard 200 for nine weeks. On 10 November 1999, the RIAA certified The Lion King "Diamond" for selling 15 million copies.

In 1994, John was inducted into the Rock and Roll Hall of Fame by Guns N' Roses' frontman Axl Rose. In 1995 he released the album Made in England (number 3). The title track is an autobiographical recounting of parts of his life. The album also featured the single "Believe". John performed "Believe" at the 1995 Brit Awards and won the Outstanding Contribution to Music prize. In September 1995, he appeared as Angel Rick on the original studio album of Randy Newman's musical Faust.

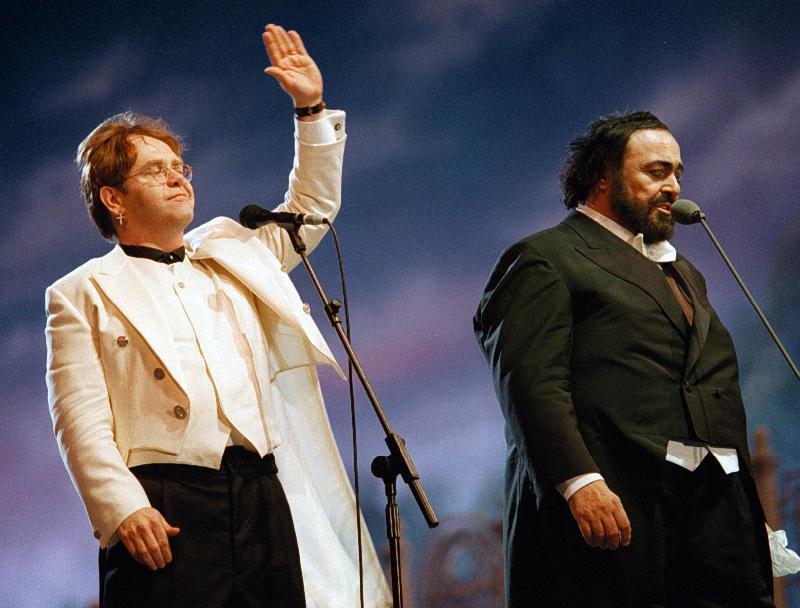
John with Luciano Pavarotti in Modena, 1996

A duet with Luciano Pavarotti, "Live Like Horses", reached number nine in the UK in December 1996. A compilation album, Love Songs, was released in 1996. Early in 1997, John held a 50th birthday party, costumed as Louis XIV, with 500 friends. He performed with the surviving members of Queen in Paris at the opening night (17 January 1997) of Le Presbytère N'a Rien Perdu De Son Charme Ni Le Jardin De Son Éclat, a work by the French ballet dancer Maurice Béjart that draws upon the AIDS crisis and the deaths of Freddie Mercury and the company's principal dancer, Jorge Donn. Later in 1997, two close friends died: the designer Gianni Versace was murdered on 15 July, and Diana, Princess of Wales, died in a Paris car crash on 31 August.

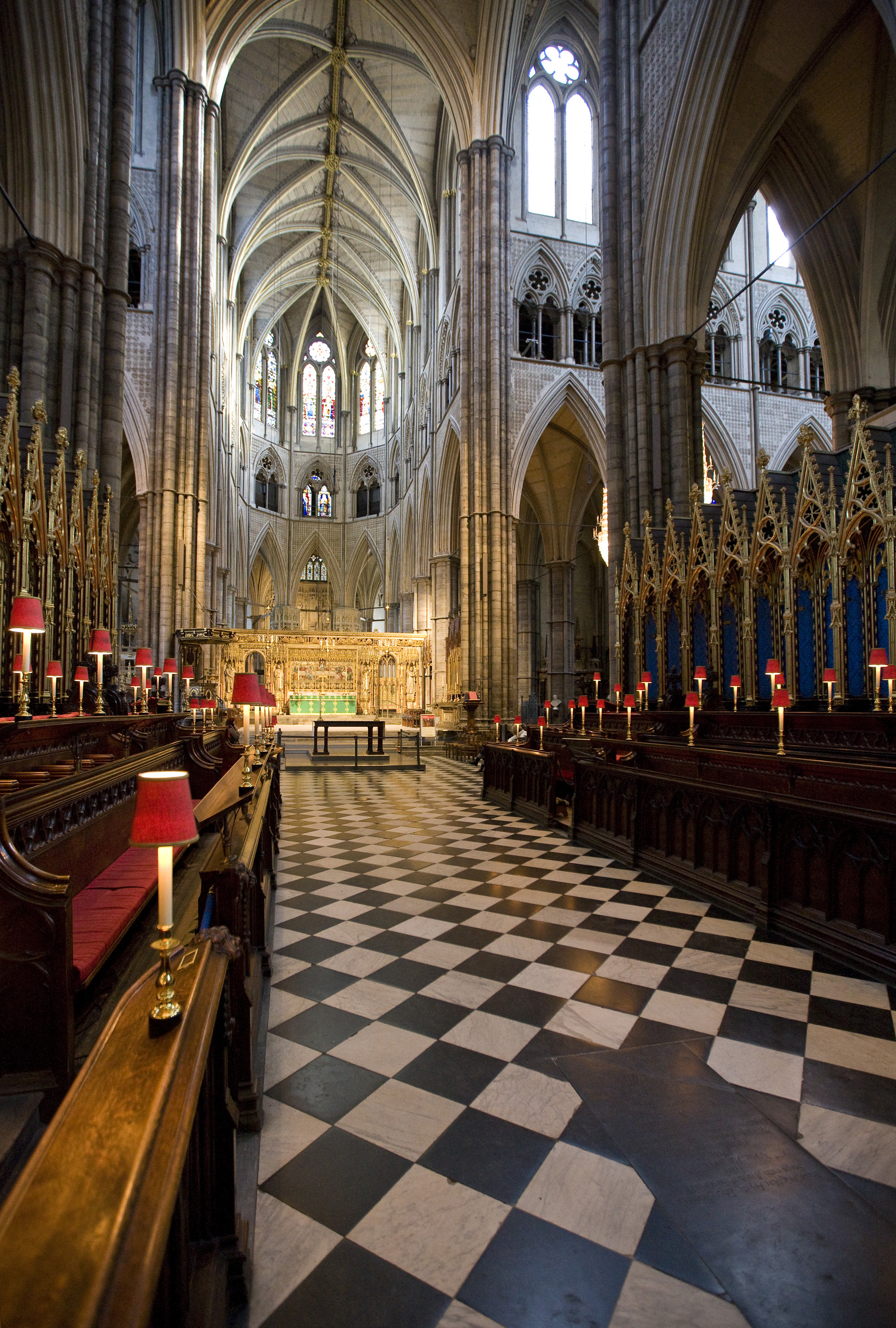
Interior of Westminster Abbey where John performed "Candle in the Wind 1997" live for the only time at Princess Diana's funeral

In early September John asked Taupin to revise the lyrics of their 1973 song "Candle in the Wind" to honour Diana, and Taupin agreed. On 6 September 1997 John performed "Candle in the Wind 1997" live for the only time at Diana's funeral in Westminster Abbey. The song became the fastest- and biggest-selling single of all time, eventually selling over 33 million copies globally. The best-selling single in UK chart history, and the best-selling single in Billboard history, it is the first single certified Diamond in the US where it sold over 11 million copies. The 2009 Guinness World Records states it is "the biggest-selling single since UK and US singles charts began in the 1950s, having accumulated worldwide sales of 33 million copies". The song's proceeds of approximately £55 million were donated to Diana's charities via the Diana, Princess of Wales Memorial Fund. It won the Grammy Award for Best Male Pop Vocal Performance at the 40th Annual Grammy Awards in 1998. The song "Something About the Way You Look Tonight" was released as a double A-side.

On 15 September 1997 John appeared at the Music for Montserrat charity concert at the Royal Albert Hall in London, performing three songs solo ("Your Song", "Don't Let the Sun Go Down on Me" and "Live Like Horses") before finishing with "Hey Jude" alongside Paul McCartney, Eric Clapton, Phil Collins, Mark Knopfler and Sting. Two months later he performed on the BBC's Children in Need charity single "Perfect Day", which reached number one in the UK. John appeared as himself in the Spice Girls film Spice World, released in December 1997.

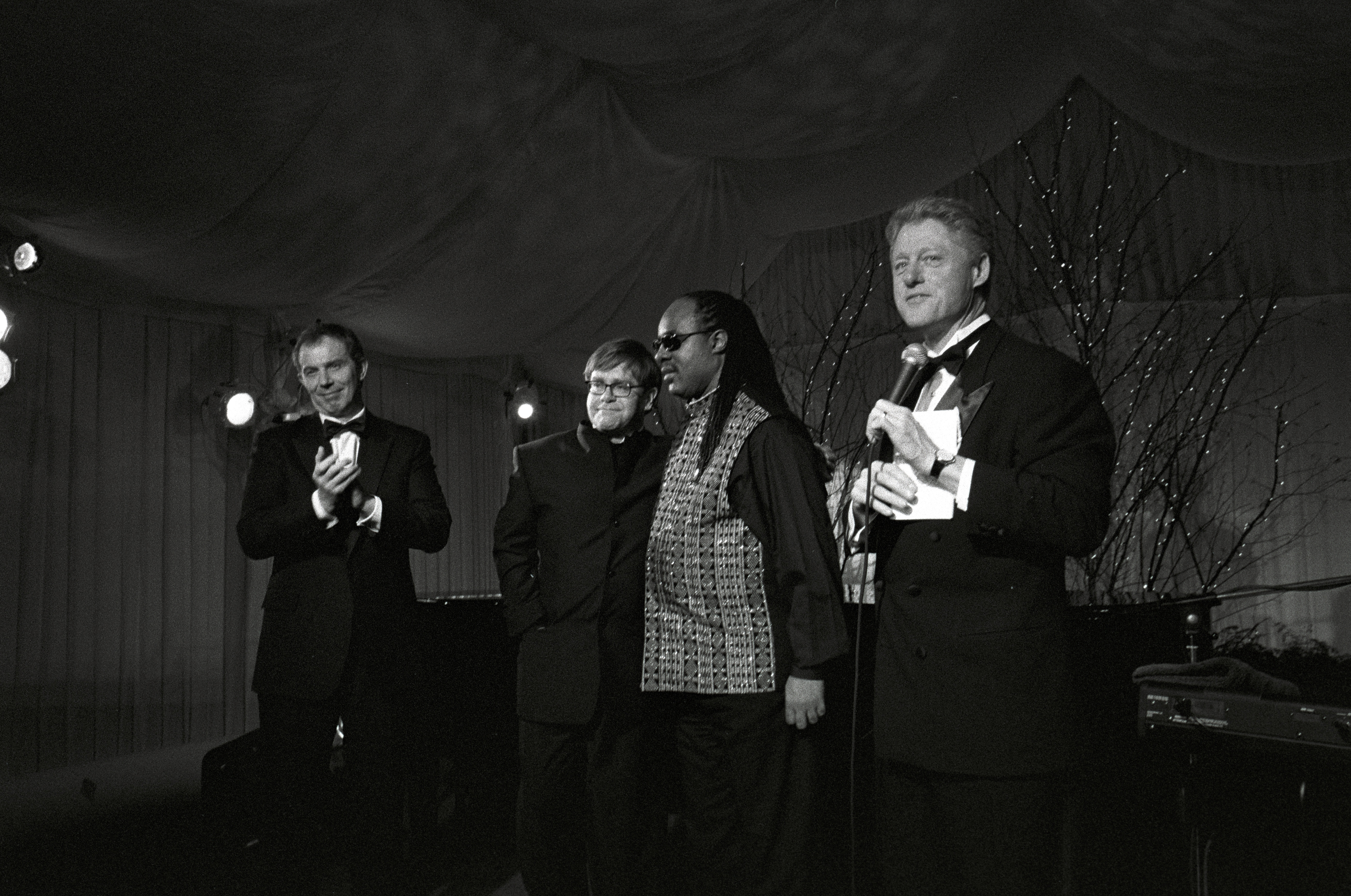
John (second from left) alongside British Prime Minister Tony Blair (left), the singer-songwriter Stevie Wonder and US President Bill Clinton at the White House in Washington, D.C., February 1998

The Lion King musical debuted on Broadway in 1997 and the West End theatre in 1999. In 2014 it had grossed over $6 billion and became the top-earning title in box-office history for both stage productions and films, surpassing the record previously held by Andrew Lloyd Webber's 1986 musical The Phantom of the Opera. In addition to The Lion King, John composed music for Disney's musical production Aida in 1999 with the lyricist Tim Rice, for which they received the Tony Award for Best Original Score at the 54th Tony Awards, and the Grammy Award for Best Musical Show Album at the 43rd Annual Grammy Awards.

The musical premiered at the Alliance Theatre in Atlanta, Georgia, US, before moving to Chicago, Illinois, and subsequently opening on Broadway in New York City. John released a live compilation album, Elton John One Night Only – The Greatest Hits, featuring songs from his show at Madison Square Garden in New York City that same year. A concept album of songs from the musical Aida, Elton John and Tim Rice's Aida, was also released and featured the John duets "Written in the Stars" with LeAnn Rimes, and "I Know the Truth" with Janet Jackson.

=== 2000–2009: Billy Elliot the Musical and 60th birthday ===
By this time, John disliked appearing in his own music videos; the video for "This Train Don't Stop There Anymore" featured Justin Timberlake portraying a young John, and the video for "I Want Love" featured Robert Downey Jr lip-syncing the song. At the 2001 Grammy Awards, John performed "Stan" with Eminem. One month after the 11 September attacks, John appeared at the Concert for New York City, performing "I Want Love" as well as "Your Song" as a duet with Billy Joel. In August 2003 John's fifth UK number-one single, "Are You Ready for Love", topped the charts.

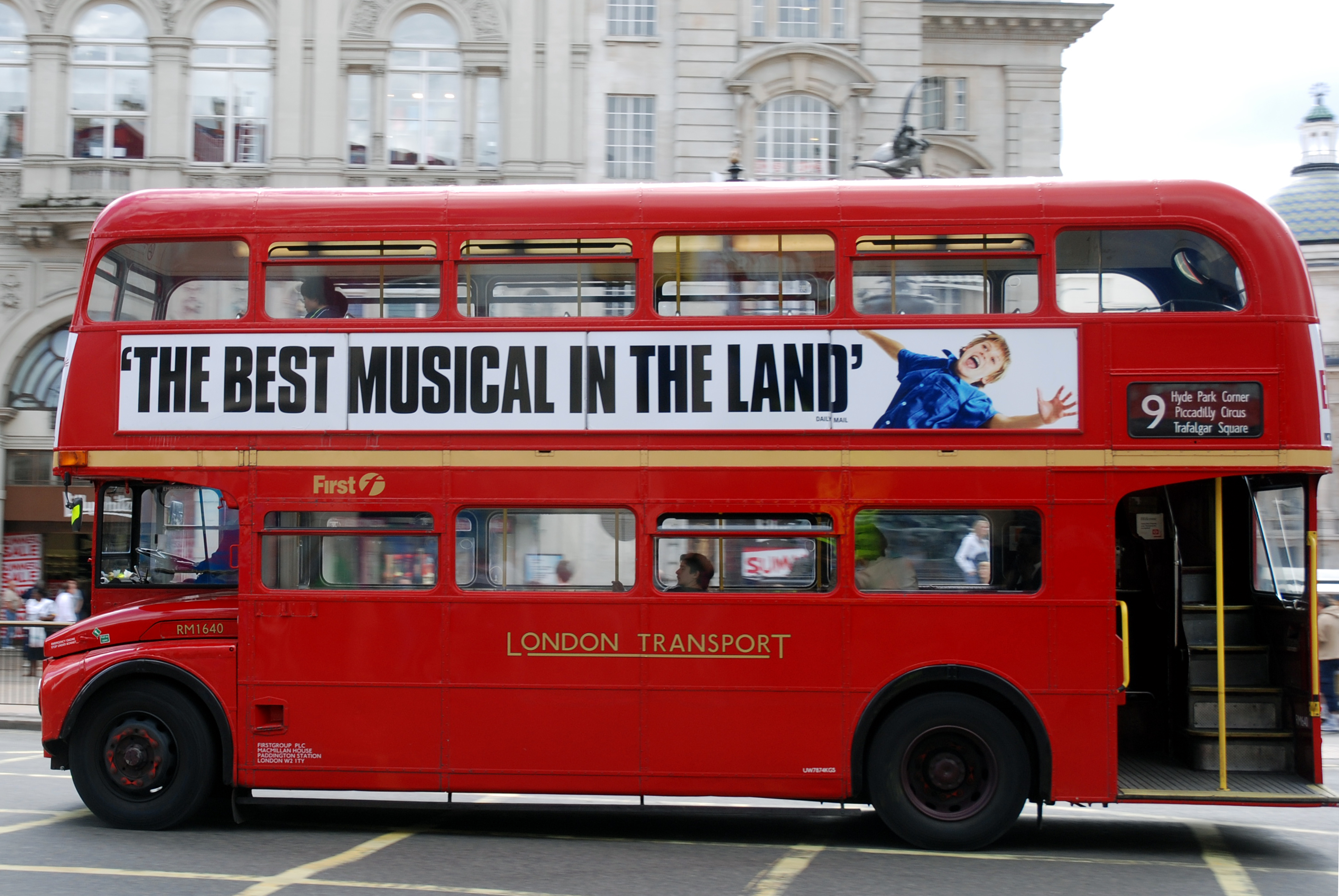
Advertisement for John's West End musical Billy Elliot on a Routemaster bus in London, 2007

Returning to musical theatre, John composed music for a West End theatre production of Billy Elliot the Musical in 2005 with playwright Lee Hall. John had been moved to write the musical after seeing the 2000 British coming-of-age film Billy Elliot, saying of the titular character, "he's like me". Opening to strong reviews, the show won four Laurence Olivier Awards, including Best New Musical. The 12th-longest-running musical in West End history, the London production, which featured Tom Holland as Billy for two years, ran through April 2016, with 4,566 performances.

As at December 2015 Billy Elliot has been seen by over 5.25 million people in London and nearly 11 million people worldwide (on Broadway where it won the Tony Award for Best Musical, in Sydney and Melbourne, Australia, Chicago, Illinois, Toronto, Ontario, Seoul, South Korea, the Netherlands and São Paulo, Brazil, etc.), grossed over $800 million worldwide and won over 80 theatre awards internationally. John's only theatrical project with Taupin is Lestat, based on Anne Rice's The Vampire Chronicles. It received negative reviews from critics and closed in May 2006 after 39 performances. John featured on the rapper Tupac Shakur's posthumous single "Ghetto Gospel", which topped the UK charts in July 2005.

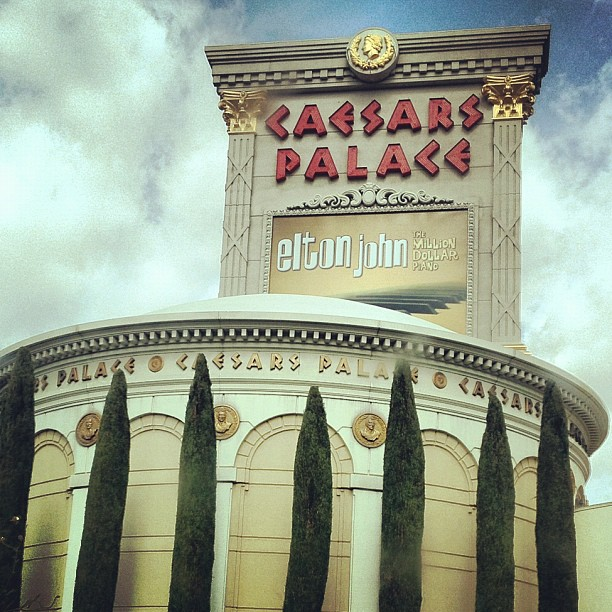
John has had two residencies at Caesars Palace, Las Vegas. The first, The Red Piano, ran from 2004 to 2009, and the second, The Million Dollar Piano (sign pictured) ran from 2011 to 2018.

In October 2003 John announced that he had signed an exclusive agreement to perform 75 shows over three years at Caesars Palace on the Las Vegas Strip in Las Vegas, US. The show, The Red Piano, was a multimedia concert featuring massive props and video montages created by David LaChapelle. Effectively, he and Celine Dion shared performances at Caesars Palace throughout the year; while one performed, the other rested. The first of these shows took place on 13 February 2004. In February 2006 John and Dion sang together at the venue to raise money for Harrah's Entertainment Inc. workers affected by the 2005 hurricanes, performing "Sorry Seems to Be the Hardest Word" and "Saturday Night's Alright (for Fighting)".

The Walt Disney Company named John a Disney Legend for his contributions to Disney's films and theatrical works on 9 October 2006. Also in 2006, he told Rolling Stone that he planned for his next record to be in R&B and hip hop. "I want to work with Pharrell Williams, Timbaland, Snoop [Dogg], Kanye [West], Eminem and just see what happens", he said. West sampled John's "Someone Saved My Life Tonight" on his 2007 song "Good Morning" and in 2010 invited him to his Hawaii studio to play piano and sing on "All of the Lights".

In March 2007 John performed at Madison Square Garden for a record-breaking 60th time for his 60th birthday; the concert was broadcast live and a DVD recording was released as Elton 60 – Live at Madison Square Garden; a greatest-hits compilation CD, Rocket Man—Number Ones, was released in 17 different versions worldwide, including a CD/DVD combo; and his back catalogue—almost 500 songs from 32 albums—became available for legal paid download.

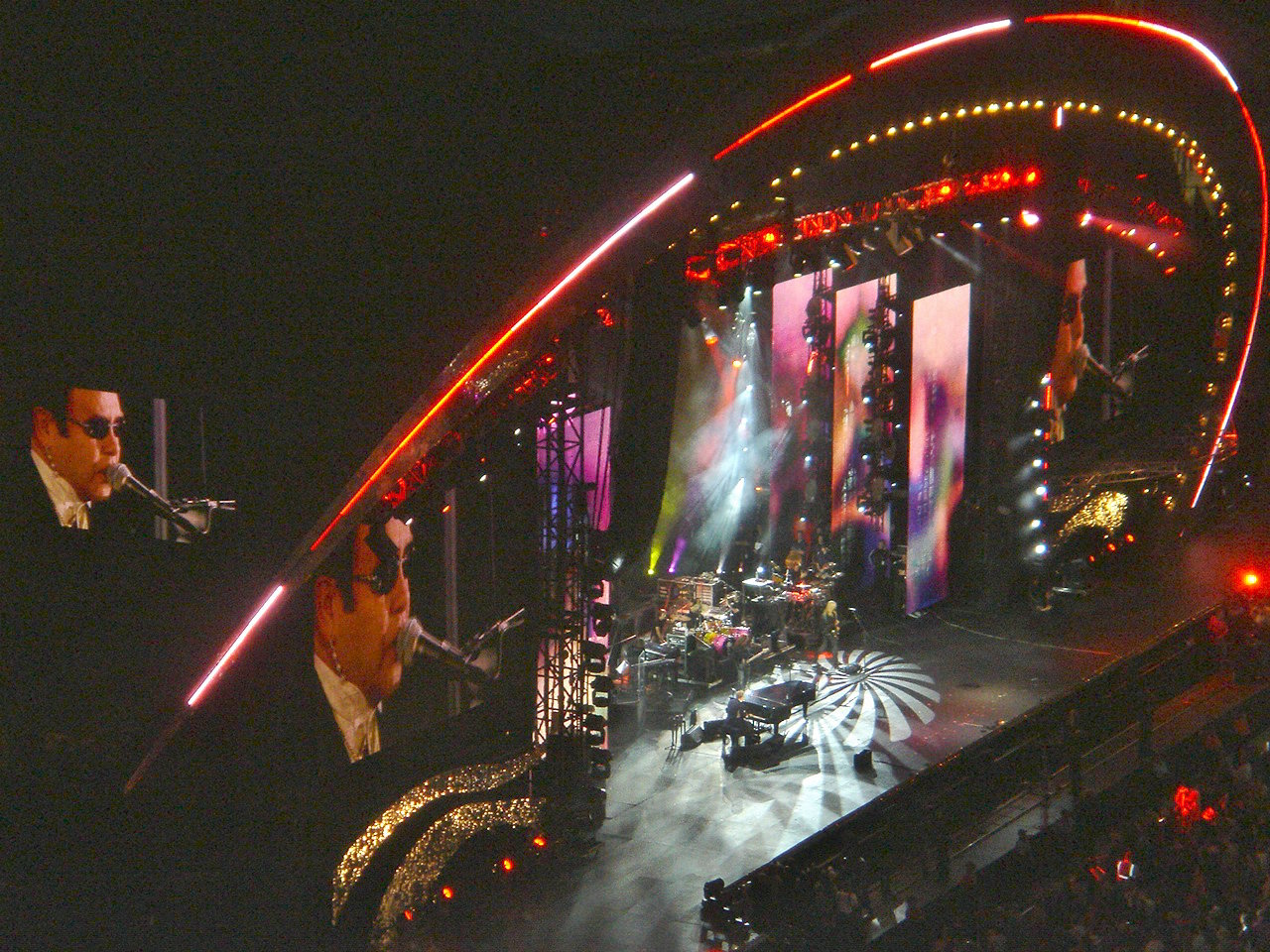
John on piano at the Concert for Diana at Wembley Stadium on 1 July 2007

On 1 July 2007 John appeared at the Concert for Diana at Wembley Stadium in honour of Diana, Princess of Wales, on what would have been her 46th birthday, with the concert's proceeds going to Diana's charities as well as to charities of which her sons, Prince William and Prince Harry, are patrons. John opened the concert with "Your Song" and closed it with "Saturday Night's Alright For Fighting", "Tiny Dancer", and "Are You Ready For Love".

On 21 June 2008 John performed his 200th show at Caesars Palace. A DVD/CD package of The Red Piano was released through Best Buy in November 2008. In a September 2008 GQ interview John said, "I'm going on the road again with Billy Joel again next year", referring to "Face to Face", a series of concerts featuring the two. The tour began in March.

In 2009 John accepted Jerry Cantrell's invitation to collaborate with his band Alice in Chains. John played the piano in the song "Black Gives Way to Blue", a tribute to the band's late lead singer, Layne Staley, which was the title track and closing song of the album Black Gives Way to Blue, released in September 2009. The first concert Staley attended was one of John's, and his mother said he was blown away by it. Cantrell added, "Elton is a very important musical influence to all of us in varying degrees, and especially to me. My first album was Elton John's Greatest Hits. And actually, we were reminded by Layne's stepfather that Elton was his first concert, so it was all really appropriate." John said he had long admired Cantrell and could not resist the offer.

=== 2010–2018: The Union to Wonderful Crazy Night ===
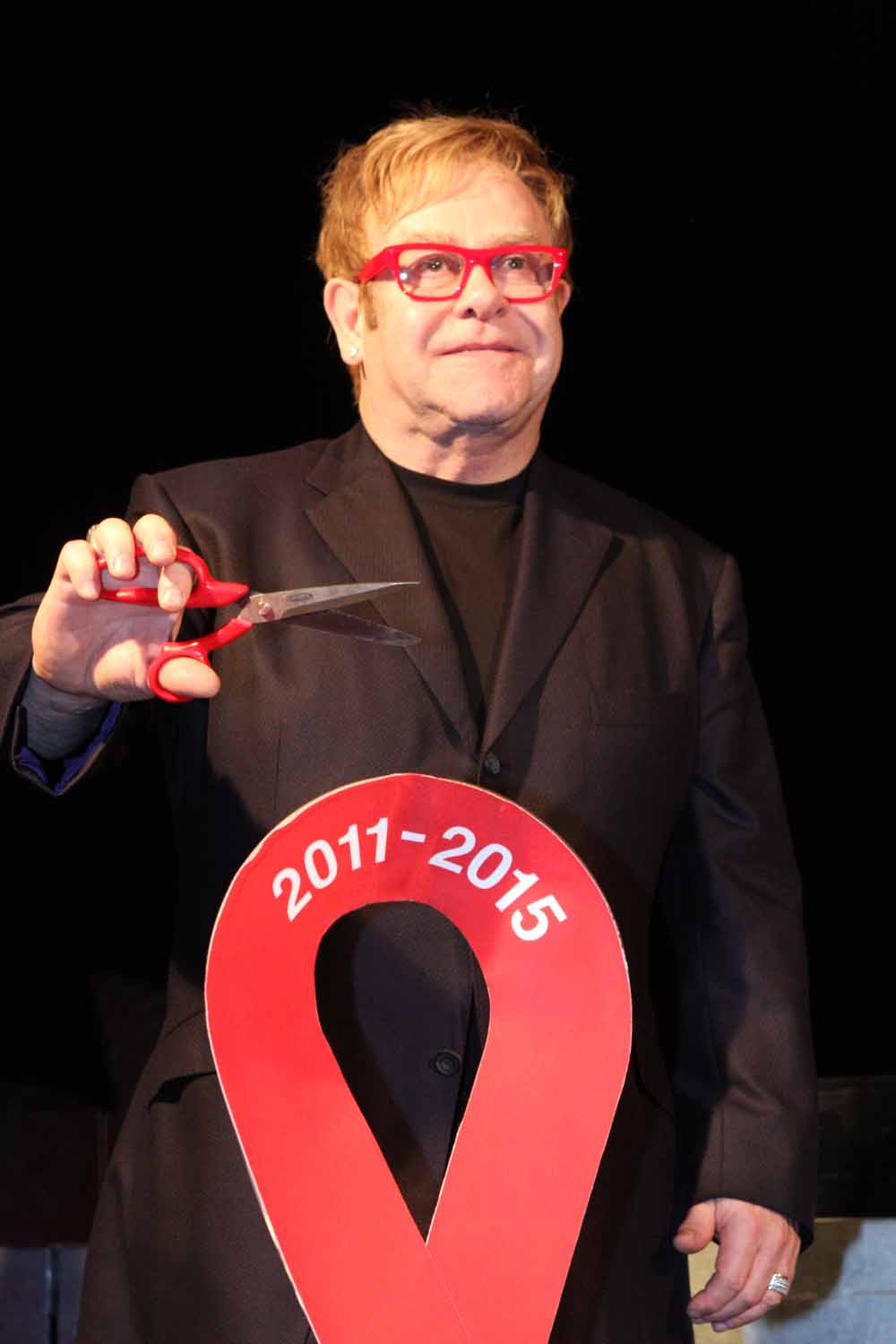
John on World AIDS Day in Sydney, Australia, on 1 December 2011

John performed a piano duet with Lady Gaga at the 52nd Annual Grammy Awards, which consisted of two songs of Gaga's, before culminating in "Your Song". On 17 June - and 17 years to the day after his previous performance in Israel - he performed at the Ramat Gan Stadium; this was significant because of other then-recent cancellations by other performers in the fallout surrounding an Israeli raid on Gaza Flotilla the month before. In his introduction to that concert, John said that he and other musicians should not "cherry-pick our conscience", in reference to Elvis Costello, who was to have performed in Israel two weeks after John did but cancelled in the wake of the aforementioned raid, citing his conscience.

John released The Union on 19 October 2010. He has said the album, a collaboration with the American singer, songwriter and sideman Leon Russell, marked a new chapter in his recording career, saying: "I don't have to make pop records any more." He began his new show The Million Dollar Piano at the Colosseum at Caesars Palace, Las Vegas, on 28 September 2011, and performed it there for the next three years. He performed his 3000th concert on 8 October 2011, at Caesars. Also in 2011, John performed vocals on "Snowed in at Wheeler Street" with Kate Bush for her album 50 Words for Snow. On 3 February 2012 he visited Costa Rica for the first time, performing at the recently built National Stadium.

On 4 June 2012 John performed at Queen Elizabeth II's Diamond Jubilee Concert at Buckingham Palace, playing a three-song set. On 30 June he played in Kyiv, Ukraine, in a joint concert with Queen + Adam Lambert for the Elena Pinchuk ANTIAIDS Foundation. An album containing remixes of songs that he recorded in the 1970s, Good Morning to the Night, was released in July 2012. The remixes were conducted by the Australian group Pnau, and the album reached number one in the UK. At the 2012 Pride of Britain Awards on 30 October, John along with Michael Caine, Richard Branson, Simon Cowell and Stephen Fry, recited Rudyard Kipling's poem "If—" in tribute to the 2012 British Olympic and Paralympics athletes.

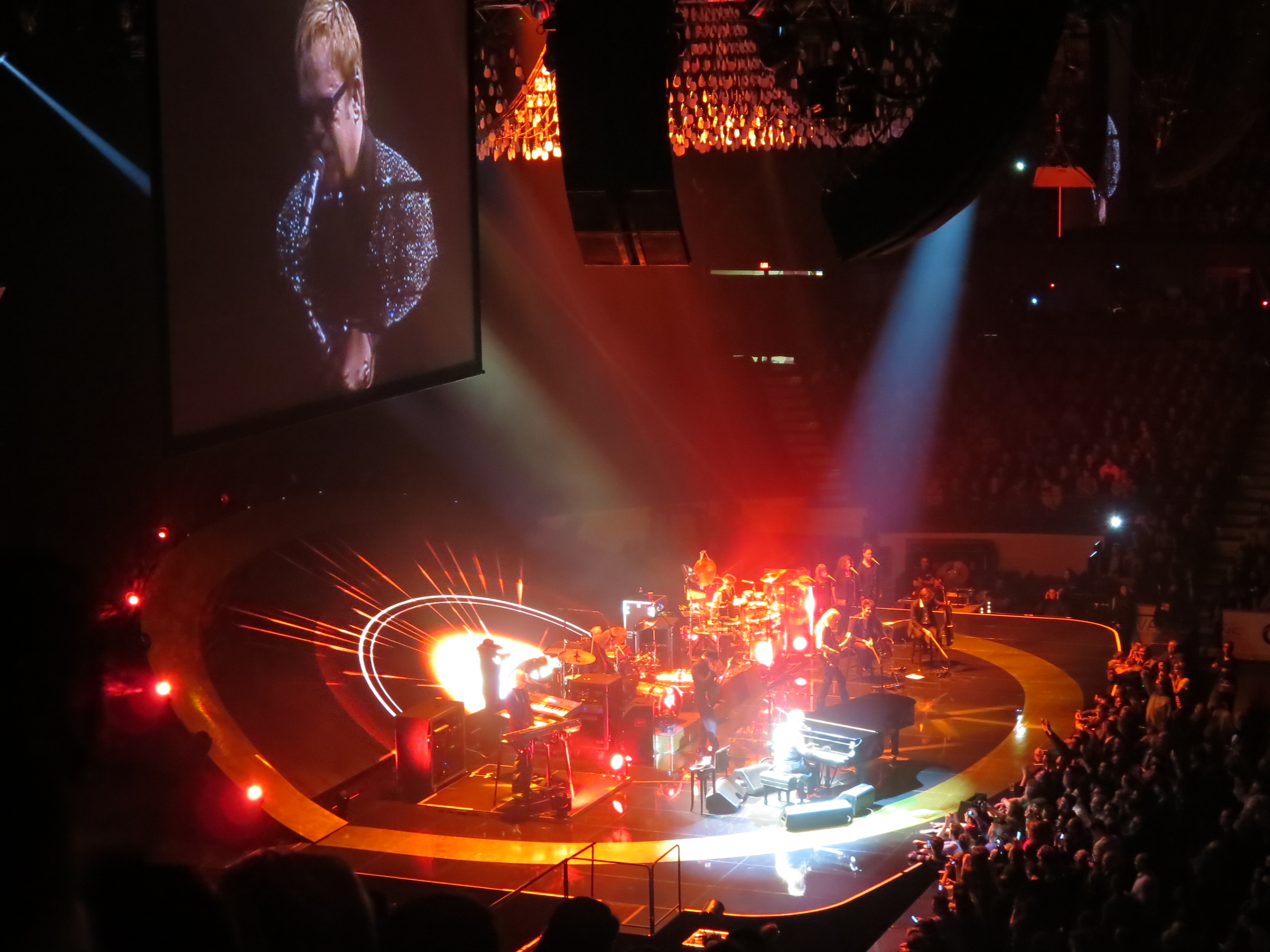
John performing at the Allstate Arena, Chicago, in November 2013

In February 2013 John performed a duet with the singer-songwriter Ed Sheeran at the 55th Annual Grammy Awards. Later in 2013 he collaborated with the rock band Queens of the Stone Age on their sixth studio album, ...Like Clockwork, contributing piano and vocals on the song "Fairweather Friends". He said he was a fan of frontman Josh Homme's side project, Them Crooked Vultures, and had phoned Homme to ask whether he could perform on the album. In September 2013 John received the first Brits Icon Award for his "lasting impact" on British culture. Rod Stewart presented him with the award on stage at the London Palladium before the two performed a duet of "Sad Songs (Say So Much)".

John's 31st album, The Diving Board, produced by T-Bone Burnett, was released in September 2013 and reached number three in the UK and number four in the US. In October 2015 it was announced he would release his 32nd studio album, Wonderful Crazy Night, on 5 February 2016. It too was produced by Burnett. The album's first single, "Looking Up", was released in the same month. This album marked John's first full album recorded with his touring band since 2006's The Captain & the Kid. He also had a major role, as himself, in the action film Kingsman: The Golden Circle, which was released in September 2017.

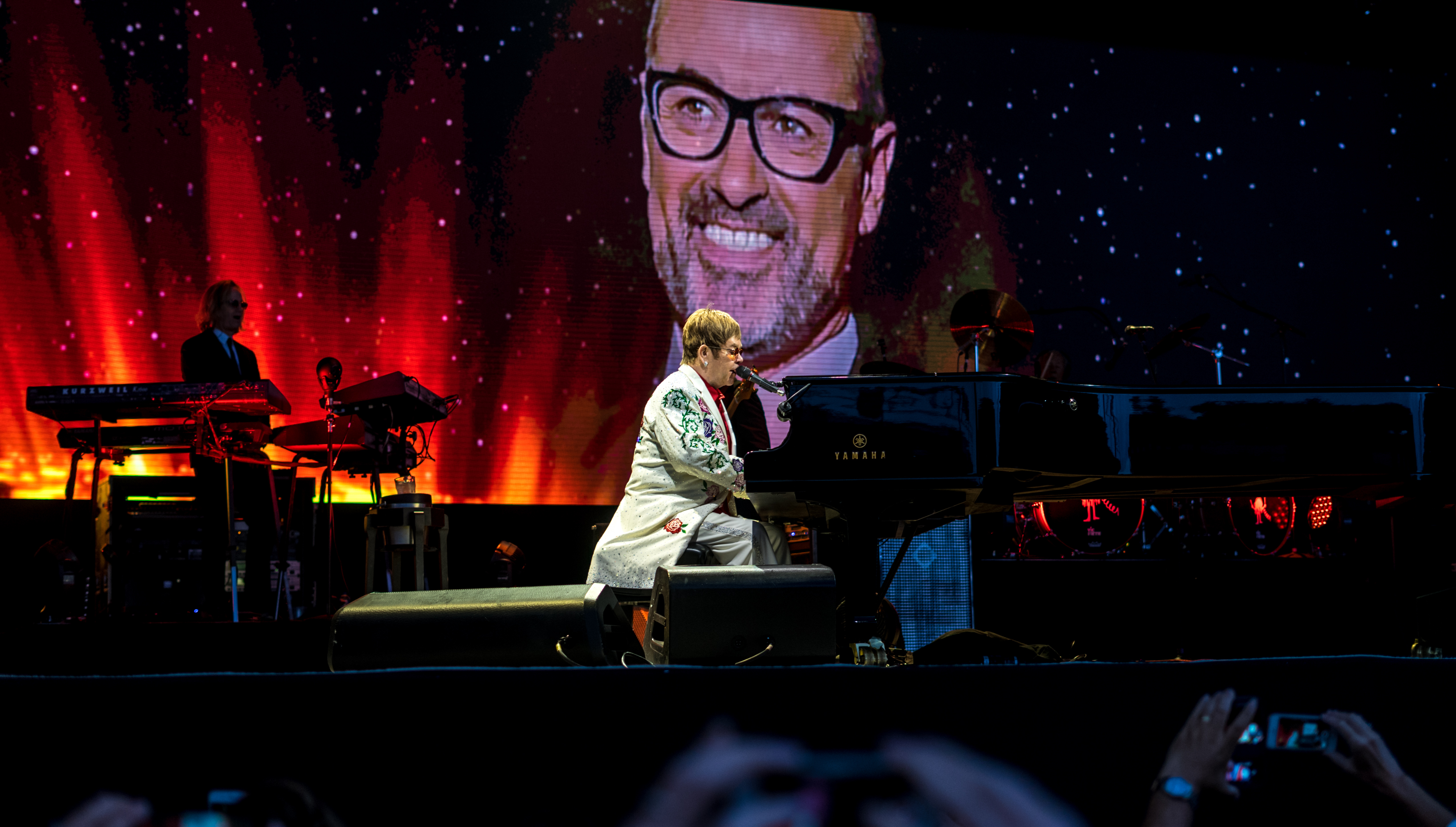
John performing a tribute to George Michael at Twickenham, London, in June 2017

On 26 January 2017 it was announced that John would compose the score for the Broadway musical version of the novel The Devil Wears Prada and its film adaptation, with Kevin McCollum as producer and Paul Rudnick writing the lyrics and story. The timeline for the musical is yet to be announced. In June 2017 John appeared in the award-winning documentary The American Epic Sessions, directed by Bernard MacMahon. In the film he recorded live on the restored first electrical sound recording system from the 1920s. John composed and arranged a lyric by Taupin, "Two Fingers of Whiskey", written specially for the film, live on camera with the help of Burnett and Jack White. Danny Eccleston in Mojo pointed out that "in one of the series' most extraordinary moments, Elton John arrives toting a box-fresh lyric by Bernie Taupin and works it up in an instant, the song materializing in front of the viewers' eyes before John and Jack White go for the take. There's the magic right there." "Two Fingers of Whiskey" was released on 9 June 2017, on Music from The American Epic Sessions: Original Motion Picture Soundtrack.

=== 2018–present: Farewell Yellow Brick Road Tour, biopic, and upcoming new music ===
On 24 January 2018 it was announced that John was retiring from touring and would soon embark on a three-year farewell tour. The first concert took place in Allentown, Pennsylvania, US, on 8 September 2018. John cited spending time with his family as the reason for his retirement: "Ten years ago if you asked me if I would stop touring I would have said no. But we had children and that changed our lives. I have had an amazing life and career but my life has changed. My priorities are now my children and my husband and my family." Consisting of more than 300 concerts worldwide, the tour ended in Stockholm, Sweden on 8 July 2023, following rescheduled shows due to the COVID-19 pandemic and health issues. In September 2018 John reportedly signed an agreement with Universal Music Group (UMG) to represent his new music "for the rest of his career" in addition to his work from the last 50 years.

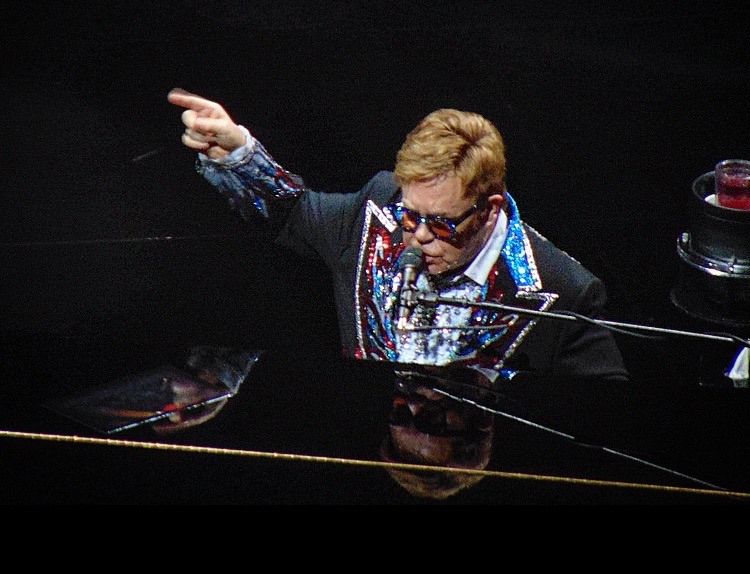
John performing in Tampa, Florida, US, in November 2019 during his Farewell Yellow Brick Road tour

A biographical film about John's life from his childhood to the 1980s, Rocketman, was produced by Paramount Pictures and released in May 2019. It was directed by Dexter Fletcher, who had also co-directed the film Bohemian Rhapsody, and stars Taron Egerton as John; John had previously appeared as a fictionalised version of himself alongside Egerton in the film Kingsman: The Golden Circle (2017). John and Egerton performed a new song written for Rocketman, "(I'm Gonna) Love Me Again", which premiered on BBC Radio 2 in 2019. The song would see John win the Academy Award for Best Original Song for the second time. In October 2019 John released what he described as his "first and only autobiography", Me. The audiobook of Me was narrated by Egerton, with John reading the prologue and epilogue.

John played at the Western Sydney Stadium (Australia) on 7 March before the remainder of the tour was postponed indefinitely on 16 March due to the COVID pandemic. In early 2020 he played piano on Ozzy Osbourne's rock ballad "Ordinary Man", released on Osbourne's album of the same name. On 29 May his duet with Lady Gaga, "Sine from Above", from her album Chromatica, was released. John released Regimental Sgt. Zippo on 12 June 2021. Recorded as his debut album in 1968, the album was shelved in favour of 1969's Empty Sky, and released vinyl-only in 2021 for Record Store Day.

On 1 September 2021 John announced his new collaboration album The Lockdown Sessions, which he made during the first COVID-19 lockdown, which was released on 22 October 2021. Artists he collaborated with on the album include Eddie Vedder, Miley Cyrus, Dua Lipa, Lil Nas X, Gorillaz, Nicki Minaj, Young Thug, Stevie Wonder, Rina Sawayama, Charlie Puth and Stevie Nicks. In a statement on the project, John explained: "I realised there was something weirdly familiar about working like this. At the start of my career, in the late 60s, I worked as a session musician. Working with different artists during lockdown reminded me of that. I'd come full circle: I was a session musician again. And it was still a blast."

"Cold Heart (Pnau remix)", a collaboration with Dua Lipa, was released on 13 August 2021, as the album's first single. It peaked at number one in the UK in October 2021, becoming John's first UK number one in 16 years since 2005's "Ghetto Gospel". With this hit, he became the first solo artist to have top 10 singles in the UK in 6 different decades. "Cold Heart" also peaked at number 1 in Australia in November 2021. At 74 years, 7 months and 14 days, John became the oldest artist to hit the top of the ARIA Singles Chart. John contributed to the charity tribute album The Metallica Blacklist, released in September 2021, by backing Miley Cyrus on a cover of the Metallica song "Nothing Else Matters".

On 29 November 2021 John and Sheeran released "Merry Christmas", a duet single for charity. Inspired by a scene from the 2003 romantic-comedy film Love Actually, the song's music video sees the duo pay homage to scenes from past British Christmas hits, including "Last Christmas", "Walking in the Air", "Merry Christmas Everyone", and "Stay Another Day". All of the UK profits from the song went to the Elton John AIDS Foundation and the Ed Sheeran Suffolk Music Foundation. The song topped the UK Singles Chart on 10 December to become John's ninth UK number one. Later that month, a comedy version of the song, titled "Sausage Rolls for Everyone" and released as a collaboration with Sheeran and LadBaby, replaced the song atop the chart and became his tenth number one, as well as his third chart-topper of 2021. In January 2022 John continued his farewell tour for the first time since the start of the COVID-19 pandemic, with his first show back taking place in New Orleans, Louisiana. To celebrate his 75th birthday in March 2022, John released a digitally remastered version of his Diamonds compilation album on streaming platforms.

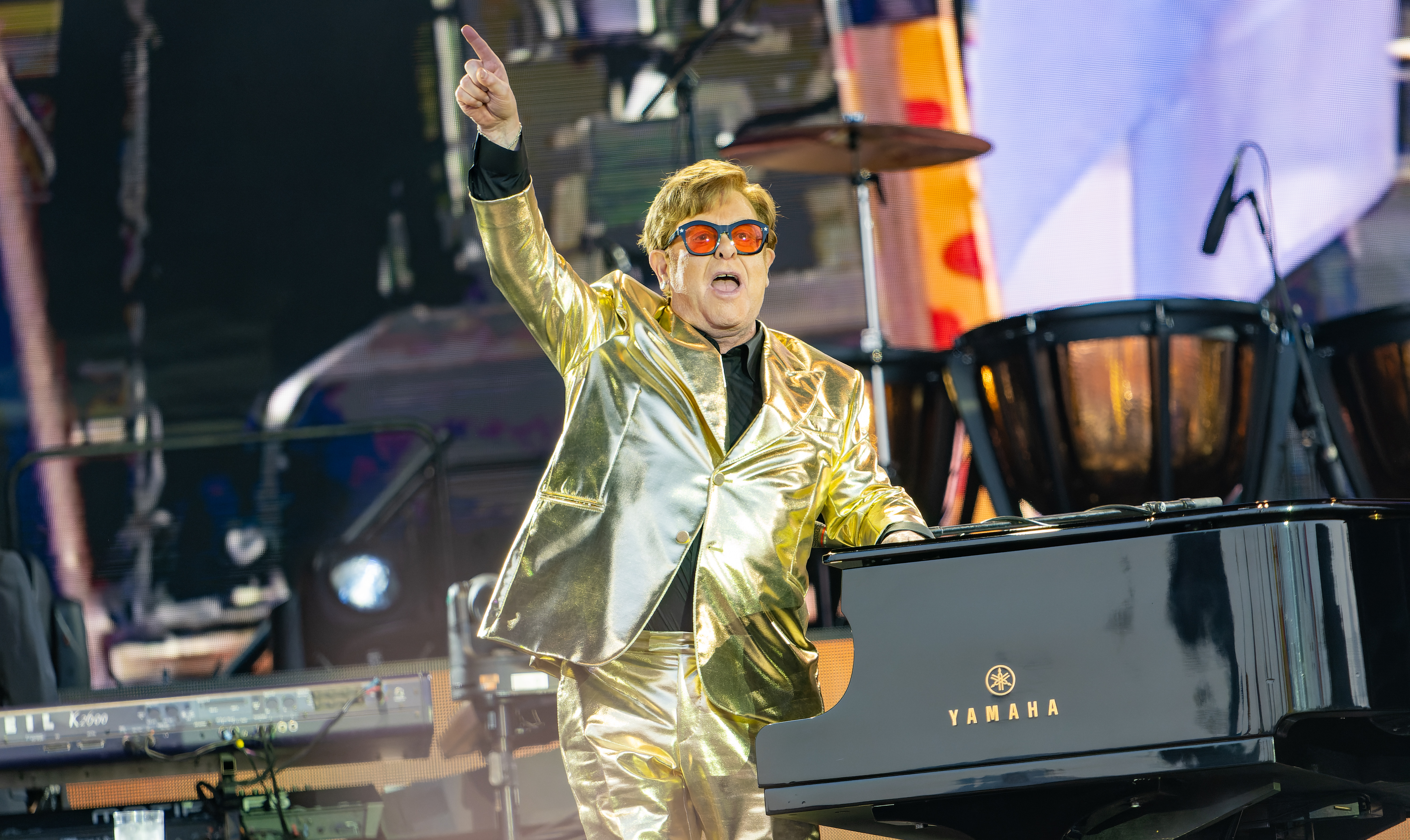
John performing during his Glastonbury Festival 2023 show

In August 2022 John collaborated with Britney Spears on the song "Hold Me Closer", which marked Spears' first new musical release in six years and her first release after the termination of her controversial conservatorship. The song had a polarised critical reception while achieving commercial success upon release. It topped the charts in five countries and reached the top ten in 19 countries. The same month it was announced that John had written the music for a new musical about the life of Tammy Faye Messner, a televangelist, with a book by the playwright James Graham and lyrics by Jake Shears. The musical, titled Tammy Faye, opened at the Almeida Theatre in London in October 2022.

On 25 June 2023 John headlined the Glastonbury Festival. Performing on the Pyramid Stage, John closed the festival with a two-hour performance which saw "Pinball Wizard" played live for the first time in over 10 years. The event drew in the festival's largest ever TV viewing-figures in the UK with a peak of 7.6 million and an average of 7.3 million, the BBC also announced it had almost 50% of all viewers across all stations viewing the event.

On 8 July 2023 John performed the final concert of the tour in Stockholm at the Tele2 Arena. Upon opening the show, John said: "Good evening Stockholm, well this is it". At the time, the tour was the highest-grossing tour ever; it has since been surpassed by Taylor Swift's Eras Tour. Although retired from touring, John has said that he will continue to "do the odd show" and is also in the early planning stages of recording a new album.

On 1 October 2024 John made a surprise appearance during a United States premiere of his documentary, Elton John: Never Too Late, at Alice Tully Hall in New York City as part of the 62nd New York Film Festival. After the screening, John appeared on stage, gave an update on his health and performed "Tiny Dancer". This was his first public performance since the end of his retirement tour. On 5 October 2025 John performed at the Singapore Grand Prix for an audience of over 70,000, the largest crowd since his retirement from touring.

== Personal life ==
=== Sexuality and family ===
In the late 1960s John was engaged to be married to his first lover, secretary Linda Woodrow, who is mentioned in the song "Someone Saved My Life Tonight". Woodrow provided financial assistance to John and Taupin at the time. John ended the relationship two weeks before their intended wedding, after being advised by Taupin and Long John Baldry. In 2020 John helped to pay for Woodrow's medical fees upon her request, despite having lost contact with her 50 years previously. In 1970, right after his first US shows in Los Angeles, at the age of 23, John lost his virginity to and started his first gay relationship with John Reid, the Tamla Motown label manager for the UK, who later became John's manager. The relationship ended five years later, although Reid remained his manager until 1998.

John married Renate Blauel, his friend and a German recording engineer, on 14 February 1984, at St Mark's Church, Darling Point, Sydney, Australia. Blauel said she attempted suicide during their honeymoon in St-Tropez after John told her that he wanted to end the union. Their marriage ended in divorce in 1988. John stated: "She was the classiest woman I've ever met, but it wasn't meant to be. I was living a lie." In 2020 Blauel sued John for writing about their relationship in his 2019 Me: Elton John Official Autobiography, which she claimed broke the terms of their divorce agreement. The case was settled later the same year. John had come out as bisexual in a 1976 interview with Rolling Stone. In 1992 he told Rolling Stone in another interview that he was "quite comfortable about being gay".

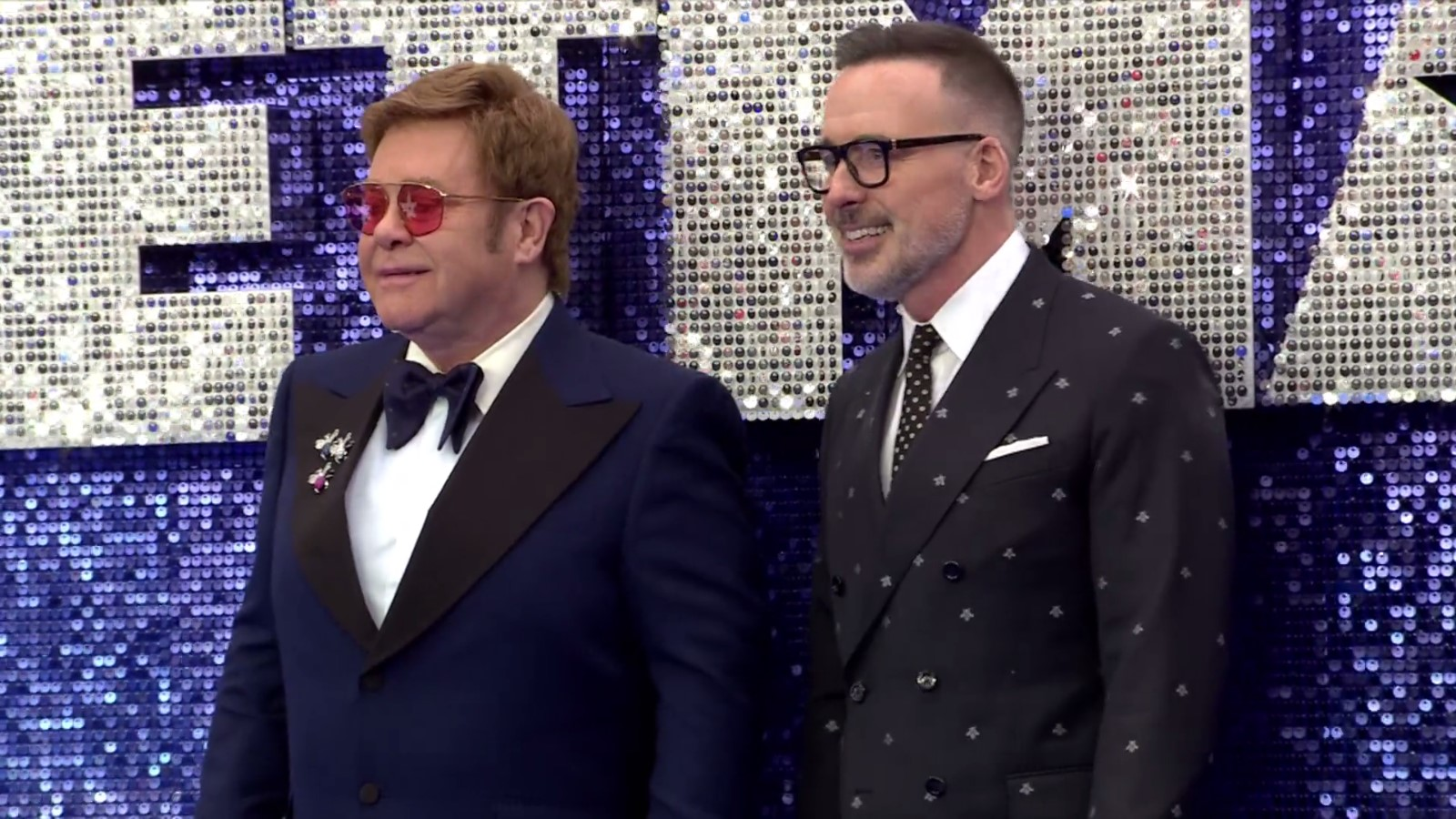
John with his husband David Furnish at Leicester Square in May 2019 for the London premiere of John's biopic film Rocketman

In 1987 John won a libel case against The Sun newspaper, which published false allegations that he had had sex with rent boys, specifically an escort named Stephen Hardy who alleged he engaged in an orgy with John at the home of Rod Stewart's manager. In 1993 John began a relationship with David Furnish, a former advertising executive and now filmmaker originally from Toronto, Canada. On 21 December 2005 (the day the Civil Partnership Act came into force) John and Furnish were among the first couples to form a civil partnership in the United Kingdom, which was held at the Windsor Guildhall. After same-sex marriage became legal in England and Wales in March 2014, John and Furnish married in Windsor, Berkshire, on 21 December 2014, the ninth anniversary of their civil partnership. In 2009 John expressed his wish to adopt an HIV-positive boy from a Ukrainian orphanage, but officials refused, saying that John was too old for the child and that adoption by unmarried couples was not allowed (specifying that same-sex marriages were not legally recognised by Ukraine).

John and Furnish have two sons. The elder, Zachary Jackson Levon Furnish-John, was born via surrogacy on 25 December 2010, in California. The younger, Elijah Joseph Daniel Furnish-John, was born on 11 January 2013, via the same surrogate. John also has ten godchildren, including Sean Lennon, David and Victoria Beckham's sons Brooklyn and Romeo, Elizabeth Hurley's son Damian Hurley, and Seymour Stein's daughter.

The Los Angeles Times described John as a "self-declared atheist". In 2000 John characterised the beliefs of the Roman Catholic Church on homosexuality as "ignorance" after a priest stated homosexuals engage in "a lifestyle that can never respond to the deepest longings of the human heart". He further stated, in a 2006 interview with The Observer, that he would "ban religion completely, even though there are some wonderful things about it" and that "religion has always tried to turn hatred toward gay people" and "turns people into hateful lemmings and it is not really compassionate". Reuters reported John admired the teachings of Jesus Christ, but was critical of organised religion.

In 2010 some Christian groups in the US criticised John after he described Jesus as a "compassionate, super-intelligent gay man who understood human problems". Bill Donohue, president of the Catholic League for Religious and Civil Rights and opponent of gay marriage, responded: "To call Jesus a homosexual is to label him a sexual deviant. But what else would we expect from a man who previously said, 'From my point of view, I would ban religion completely.'" John stated in his 2019 autobiography, Me, that he had received many death threats as a result of his statements. Neal Horsley, a Christian Reconstructionist from Bremen, Georgia, US, was arrested for making terrorist threats, after posting a YouTube video stating: "We're here today to remind Elton John that he has to die". The charges were subsequently dropped. In 2008 John said he preferred civil partnerships to marriage for gay people, but by 2012 he had changed his position and become a supporter of same-sex marriage in the United Kingdom. John said:

"There is a world of difference between calling someone your 'partner' and calling them your 'husband'. 'Partner' is a word that should be preserved for people you play tennis with, or work alongside in business. It doesn't come close to describing the love that I have for David, and he for me. In contrast, 'husband' does".

In 2014, John expressed his opinion that Jesus would have been in favour of same-sex marriage.

In July 2026, John and Furnish were among seven individuals who lost a High Court privacy case against Associated Newspapers, the publisher of the Daily Mail and The Mail on Sunday. They had alleged that details were published about the birth of their surrogate son, including his birth certificate before the couple had received their own copy.

=== Wealth ===
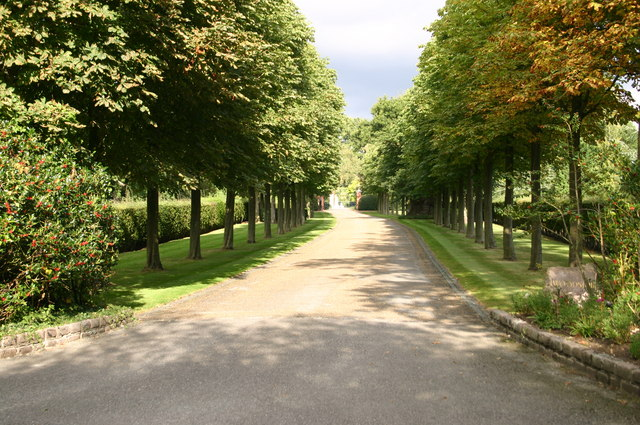
The tree-lined drive to John's home in Woodside in Old Windsor, Berkshire

In April 2009 the Sunday Times Rich List estimated John's wealth at £175 million (US$265 million) and ranked him the 322nd wealthiest person in Britain. A decade later, John was estimated to have a fortune of £320 million in the 2019 Sunday Times Rich List, making him one of the 10 wealthiest people in the British music industry. Aside from Woodside, his main home in Old Windsor, Berkshire, John owns residences in London, Nice, and Venice, as well as in Atlanta and Los Angeles in the US. His property in Nice is on Mont Boron. John is an art-collector and is believed to have one of the largest private photography collections in the world.

In 2000 John admitted to having spent £30 million in just under two years—an average of £1.5 million a month. Between January 1996 and September 1997 he spent more than £9.6m on property and £293,000 on flowers. In June 2001 he sold twenty of his cars at Christie's auction house, saying he never had the chance to drive them because he was out of the country so often. The sale, which included a 1993 Jaguar XJ220, the most expensive at £234,750, and several Ferraris, Rolls-Royces, and Bentleys, raised nearly £2 million. In 2002, he declared bankruptcy. In 2003 he sold the contents of his Holland Park home – expected to fetch £800,000 at Sotheby's — to modernise the decoration and to display some of his contemporary art collection. Every year since 2004 he has opened a shop called "Elton's Closet", in which he sells his secondhand clothes. In October 2021 John was named in the Pandora Papers, which allege a secret financial deal of politicians and celebrities, using tax havens, in an effort to avoid the payment of owed taxes.

=== Other ===
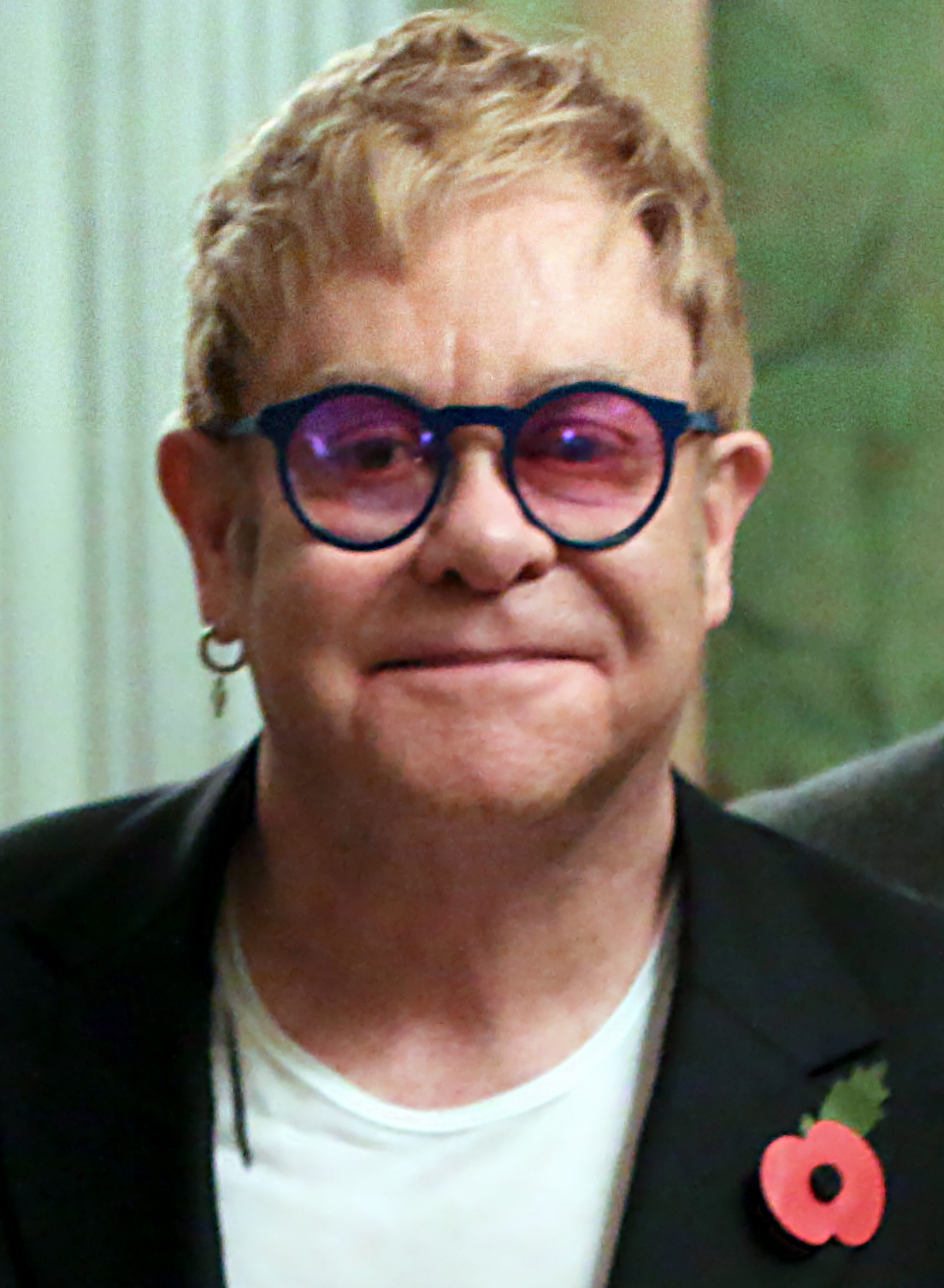
John wearing a remembrance poppy in 2015

A longtime tennis enthusiast, in 1975, he released the song "Philadelphia Freedom" in tribute to his friend Billie Jean King's World Team Tennis team, the Philadelphia Freedoms. King was a player-coach for the team at the time. John and King remain friends and co-host an annual pro-am event to benefit AIDS charities, most notably the Elton John AIDS Foundation, of which King is a chairperson. John, who maintains a part-time residence in Atlanta, Georgia, US, became a fan of the Atlanta Braves baseball team, when he moved there in 1991.

John has appeared in commercials for Diet Coke (beginning in 1990), the Royal Mail, Snickers and John Lewis & Partners department store, among others. The authors Roger Blackwell and Tina Stephan wrote, "the relationship of Elton John and Diet Coke is one of the classic success stories in the role of sponsorship in brand building." His 2018 John Lewis & Partners Christmas advert shown in the UK, titled "The Boy & The Piano", sees him reminisce about his life and career in reverse, culminating with Christmas Day in the 1950s when he received a piano for Christmas from his mother.

An admirer of Monty Python, he was among a group of musicians who helped to finance their film Monty Python and the Holy Grail (1975). At the 2nd Empire Awards, in 1997, John presented the comedy group the Empire Inspiration Award. John performed "Don't Let the Sun Go Down on Me," at the memorial service for the Australian cricketer Shane Warne on 30 March 2022. John is among the people interviewed for the documentary film If These Walls Could Sing directed by Mary McCartney about the recording studios at Abbey Road which premiered in November 2022.

On 20 June 2023 John said the reaction to Phillip Schofield's secret affair with a younger colleague was "totally homophobic", stating: "If it was a straight guy in a fling with a young woman, it wouldn't even make the papers." On 17 July 2023 John gave evidence as a defence witness at Kevin Spacey's sexual assault trial. In December 2024 Madame Tussauds revealed a new wax work of John, with it being their most structurally ambitious figure ever. The statue features John in his 1970s heyday as he defies gravity as and is suspended mid-air over his rhinestone piano in his signature handstand move from the era.

=== Football ===
"At the 1984 Cup Final, the song 'Abide with Me' was played and that's why I cried. The song evokes my memory of childhood."

— Elton John on his emotions during the FA Cup Final's traditional pre-match hymn.

John became the chairman and director of Watford Football Club in 1976, having supported the team since his youth. John appointed Graham Taylor as manager and invested large sums of money as the club rose three divisions into the English First Division. At their height, the club finished runners up in the First Division, in 1983, and reached the FA Cup Final, at Wembley Stadium, in 1984. John sold the club to Jack Petchey in 1987, but remained president.

Ten years later, John repurchased the club from Petchey and once again became chairman. He stepped down in 2002, when the club needed a full-time chairman, but continued as president. Although no longer the majority shareholder, John still holds a significant financial interest. In 2005 and 2010 John held a concert at Watford's home stadium, Vicarage Road, and donated proceeds to the club.

John has remained friends with a number of high-profile football-players, including Pelé and David Beckham. From late 1975 to 1976, John was a part-owner of the Los Angeles Aztecs of the North American Soccer League. On 13 December 2014 he appeared at Watford's Vicarage Road with his husband and sons for the opening of the "Sir Elton John stand". He called the occasion "one of the greatest days of my life". John's paternal cousin Roy Dwight was a professional footballer, who scored for Nottingham Forest in the 1959 FA Cup Final before breaking his leg later in the same match.

=== Political views ===
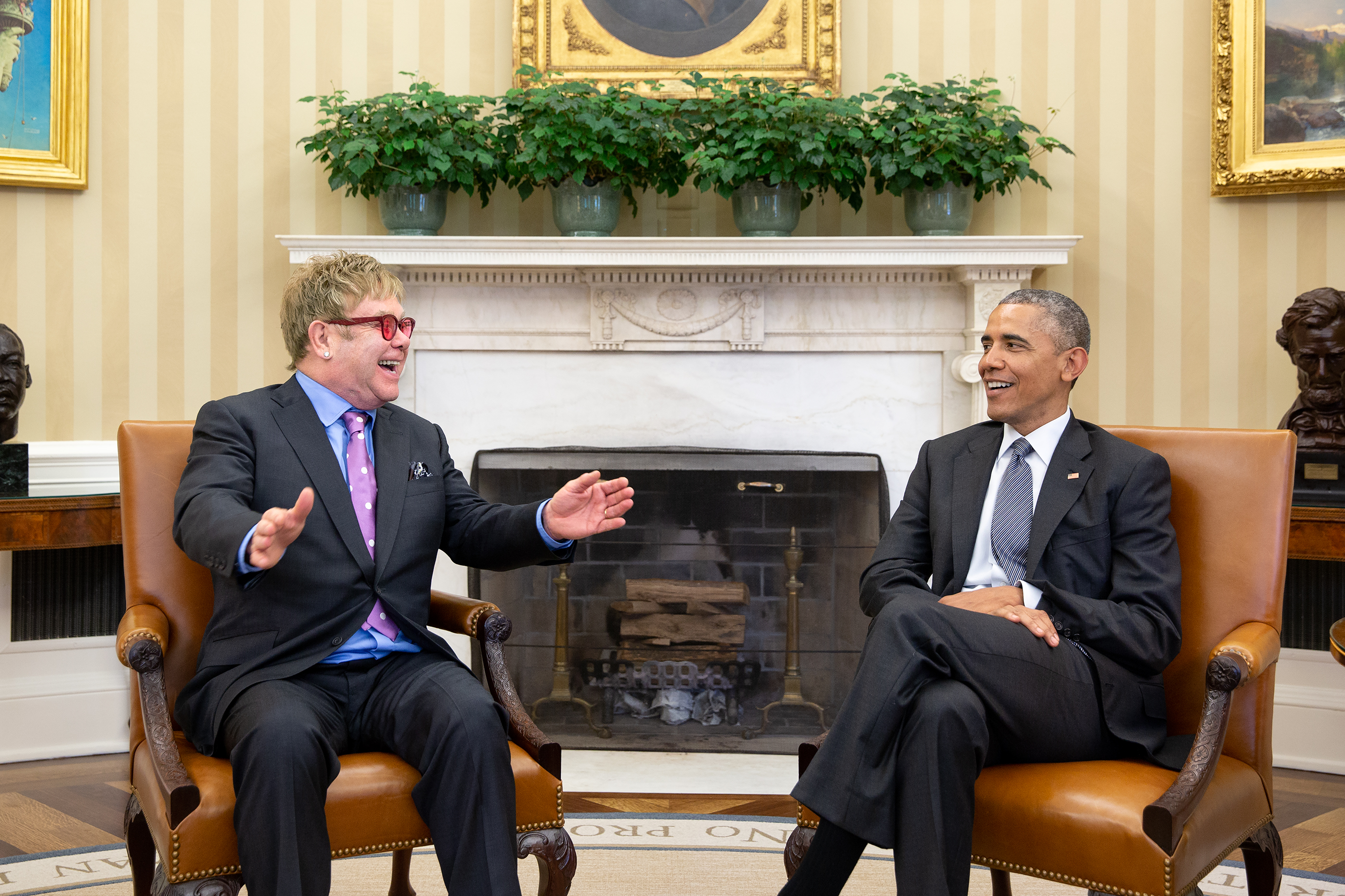
John and US President Barack Obama at the White House, 6 May 2015

In 2006, regarding his political views, John said: "If I was to say what I am, I'd be a Labour man. I like Tony Blair a lot, I think he's a good man. And in America I'd definitely be a Democrat; I'd never be a Republican." John met Blair at the Brit Awards 1998, where Blair awarded him the Freddie Mercury Award for his charitable work with the Elton John AIDS Foundation. Although John was still fond of Blair as a person, his opinions about Blair's leadership qualities declined over time, and by 2006 he planned to withdraw his support from the Labour Party, saying: "I think it's very hard to be in power for a long time. I think you lose touch. It's that goldfish bowl mentality."

John was also a friend of Blair's successor Gordon Brown, but despite being called "one of the Labour Party's most stalwart supporters" by The Daily Telegraph, the newspaper described him as a "floating voter" in 2009. John announced his intention to vote Remain during the UK's 2016 European Union referendum on Instagram, sharing an image with the words "build bridges not walls", along with the caption "I'm voting to remain. #StrongerInEurope". In 2019 he said the Brexit vote and the way it had been handled had made him ashamed. In 2021 John said that his requests to meet with Boris Johnson regarding Brexit and touring visas for musicians were ignored. In 2023 John addressed a cross-party gathering of politicians at Westminster and said that the winner of the next general election could help to eradicate AIDS worldwide by the end of the decade. He returned to publicly supporting Labour at the 2024 general election, endorsing its leader, Keir Starmer, to become prime minister. In 2025 John said he felt "incredibly betrayed" by the Labour government over plans to exempt technology firms from copyright laws, saying Starmer needed to "wise up" and describing Technology Secretary Peter Kyle as "a bit of a moron".

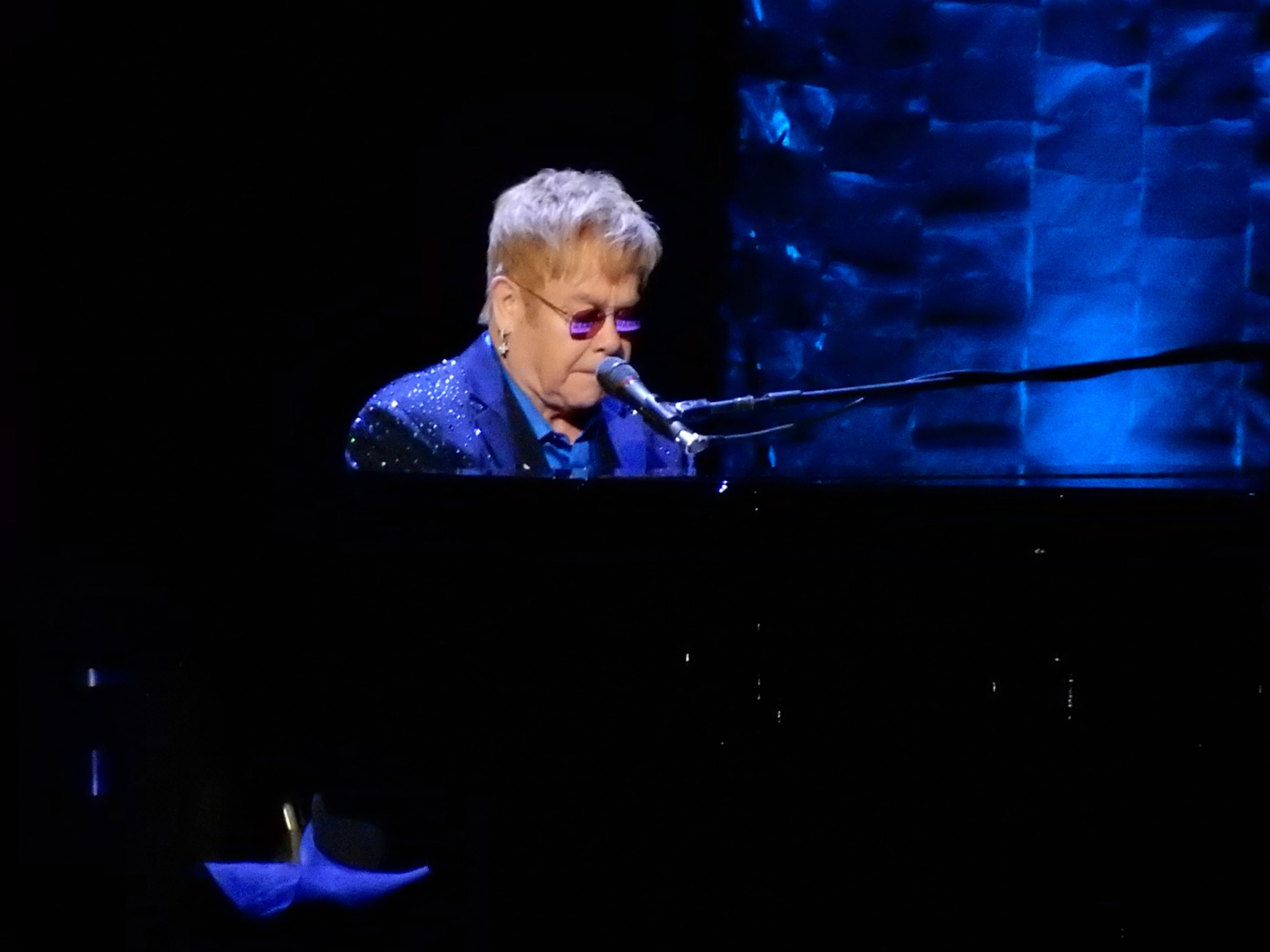
John performing at Radio City Music Hall for Hillary Clinton's 2016 US presidential campaign

John called President George W. Bush "the worst thing that ever happened to America" and was "very against the Iraq War", but later praised Bush as the president who had done the most to combat AIDS. After the senator Barack Obama won the 2008 United States presidential election, John called Obama's victory "incredibly moving." He would later meet Obama in the White House on 6 May 2015. During the 2016 US presidential election, John supported Hillary Clinton's campaign, and performed alongside Katy Perry and Andra Day at Clinton's fundraiser concert at Radio City Music Hall, New York City. After his performance, John praised Clinton as "the only choice" America had.

John was among 27 artists to have opposed Donald Trump's use of their music at his campaign rallies, and declined an invitation to attend Trump's inauguration as US president in January 2017, stating: "I have given it a lot of thought, and as a British National I don't feel that it's appropriate for me to play at the inauguration of an American President, please accept my apologies." He also exhorted Trump to continue the global fight against HIV/AIDS, and closed his letter by wishing Trump "every success with your presidency." Trump, a fan of John's music, has referenced John on numerous instances, including referring to North Korean Supreme Leader Kim Jong Un as "Little Rocket Man" during Trump's first address to the United Nations in September 2017. He also said he had given Kim a CD of the song "Rocket Man" that was signed by John, and said he had taken piano lessons from John. In an interview with Variety, John was asked about Trump's use of term to describe Kim, and he responded, "I laughed, I thought it was brilliant."

In 2022, after John performed at the White House, US President Joe Biden surprised him by presenting him with the National Humanities Medal. Biden said of John: "Like so many Americans, our family loves his music. It's clear Elton John's music has changed our lives." Biden said in his 2017 book Promise Me, Dad that he sang "Crocodile Rock" to his son Beau when he was a child, and again when he was dying of cancer. During the 2024 US presidential election, John assisted Biden at the opening of the Stonewall National Monument Visitor Center in New York City, the first LGBTQ centre in the National Park Service's network.

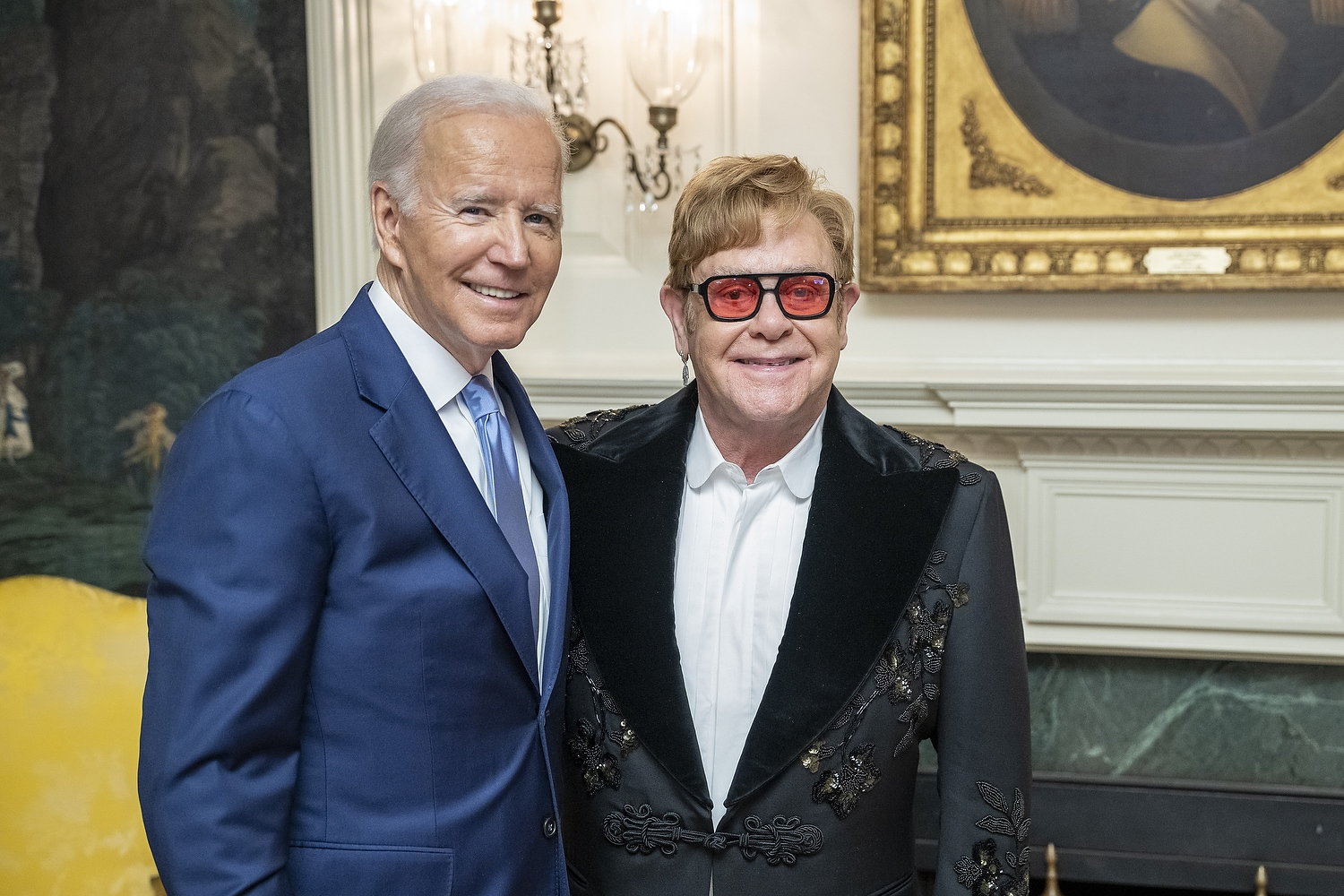
John and US President Joe Biden at the White House, 23 September 2022

In 2013 John resisted calls to boycott Russia in protest at the Russian gay propaganda law, but told fans at a Moscow concert that the laws were "inhumane and isolating", and he was "deeply saddened and shocked over the current legislation". In a January 2014 interview Russian President Vladimir Putin spoke of John in an attempt to show that there was no discrimination against gays in Russia, saying: "Elton John – he's an extraordinary person, a distinguished musician, and millions of our people sincerely love him, regardless of his sexual orientation." John responded by offering to introduce Putin to Russians abused under Russian legislation banning "homosexual propaganda". On 24 September 2015 the Associated Press reported that Putin called John and invited him to meet in the future to discuss LGBT rights in Russia.

In October 2020 John called attention to the Nagorno-Karabakh conflict between Armenia and Azerbaijan. He said in his Instagram post: "In May 2018, I visited [Armenia] and was overwhelmed with the kindness and humanity shown to me by the Armenian people. Now Armenia and Artsakh are under attack from unprovoked Azeri/Turkish aggression. Civilians are being targeted and there are needless deaths on both sides."

On 9 December 2022 John left Twitter, following changes to its rules made by new owner, Elon Musk, stating: "All my life I've tried to use music to bring people together. Yet it saddens me to see how misinformation is now being used to divide our world. I've decided to no longer use Twitter, given their recent change in policy which will allow misinformation to flourish unchecked." Musk replied to the post saying: "I love your music. Hope you come back. Is there any misinformation in particular that you're concerned about?" In December 2024 John made public his opposition to cannabis legalization, noting, among other things, his own past drug use. John described its legalization in Canada and parts of the United States as "one of the greatest mistakes of our time".

=== Friendship with the British royal family ===
John has performed at a number of events involving the British royal family, such as the funeral of Diana, Princess of Wales, at Westminster Abbey in 1997, the Party at the Palace in 2002 and the Queen's Diamond Jubilee Concert outside Buckingham Palace in 2012. On 4 June 2022 John was projected on to the facade of Buckingham Palace playing "Your Song" (pre-recorded at Windsor Castle) at the Platinum Party at the Palace to mark the Queen's Platinum Jubilee. After the death of Elizabeth II on 8 September 2022, John paid tribute to her during a show by saying "She led the country through some of our greatest and darkest moments with grace, decency and a genuine caring warmth." John was close friends with Diana, and has remained close with her sons, William and Harry.

=== Health ===
By 1975 the pressures of stardom had begun to take a serious toll on John. During "Elton Week" in Los Angeles that year, he had a cocaine overdose. He also developed the eating disorder bulimia. In a 2002 CNN interview with Larry King, King asked if John knew of Diana, Princess of Wales's eating disorder; John replied: "Yes, I did. We were both bulimic." In a July 2019 Instagram post, John stated he had been sober for 29 years. At a 2022 concert in Indianapolis, US, John said he cleaned himself up after spending time with the family of Ryan White. "I knew that my lifestyle was crazy and out of order. ... I cannot thank them enough, because without them, I'd probably be dead." In a 2014 interview, he also attributed his sobriety to the Kate Bush and Peter Gabriel duet "Don't Give Up" from 1986, in particular the lyric from Bush, "Rest your head. You worry too much. It's going to be all right. When times get rough you can fall back on us. Don't give up." He states, "she [Bush] played a big part in my rebirth. That record helped me so much."

On 22 April 2017 John was discharged from hospital after two nights of intensive care for contracting "a harmful and unusual" bacterial infection during his return flight home from a South American tour in Santiago, Chile, and was forced to cancel all his shows scheduled for April and May 2017. In October 2021 John required hip surgery after "falling awkwardly on a hard surface". On 16 February 2020 his first show at Mount Smart Stadium in Auckland was cut short. He had been diagnosed with walking pneumonia, and lost his voice during the show. He was cleared to perform the next show on 19 February.

In January 2022 John had to temporarily postpone two shows of his Farewell Yellow Brick Road tour in Dallas, Texas, US, after testing positive for COVID-19 and experiencing mild symptoms, and resumed the tour again after making a full recovery. On 1 December 2024 John revealed that he had partially lost his eyesight. In September he had said that a severe eye infection he contracted in July, while spending the summer in the South of France, had left him blind in his right eye and with "only limited vision" in his left.

== Philanthropy ==
John is well known for his philanthropic efforts, being involved in charity fundraising events since 1986. In 1992, after losing two friends – (the HIV/AIDS spokesman Ryan White and his fellow-musician Freddie Mercury) to AIDS in the span of a year – John founded the Elton John AIDS Foundation, an organisation which has raised over $600 million to support HIV-related programmes in 55 countries. John was recognised for his services to charity twice, receiving a knighthood from Elizabeth II in 1998 and being appointed by her to be a member of the Order of the Companions of Honour in 2020.

=== AIDS foundation ===
John has said that he took risks with unprotected sex during the 1980s and considers himself lucky to have avoided contracting HIV. In 1985 he joined Dionne Warwick, Gladys Knight and Stevie Wonder in recording the single "That's What Friends Are For", with profits donated to the American Foundation for AIDS Research. The song went to number one in the United States the following year and won the Grammy Award for Best Pop Performance by a Duo or Group with Vocals. In April 1990 John travelled to Indianapolis, Indiana, to be by the side of Ryan White, a teenage haemophiliac whom he had befriended and whose health was deteriorating. On the eve of White's death, he performed at Farm Aid IV, dedicating "Candle in the Wind" to White. He performed his 1968 ballad "Skyline Pigeon" at White's funeral.

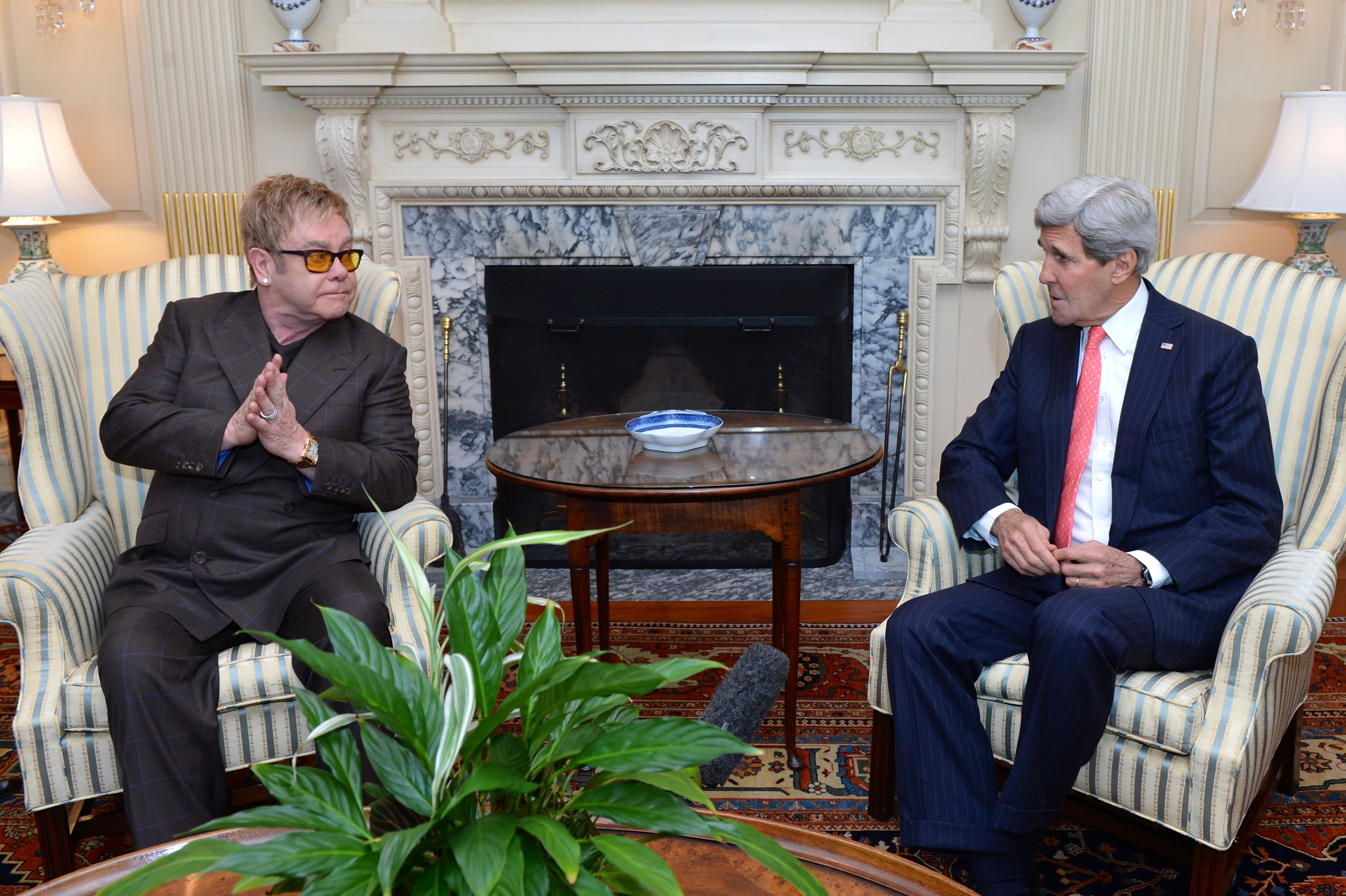
John and United States Secretary of State John Kerry discuss AIDS relief and the work of the Elton John AIDS Foundation at the United States Department of State in Washington, D.C., 24 October 2014.

John became more closely associated with AIDS charities following the deaths of his friends Ryan White in 1990 and Freddie Mercury in 1991, raising large amounts of money and using his public profile to raise awareness of the disease. He founded the Elton John AIDS Foundation in 1992 as a charity to fund programmes for HIV/AIDS prevention, for the elimination of prejudice and discrimination against HIV/AIDS-affected individuals, and to provide services to people living with or at risk of contracting HIV/AIDS. This continues to be one of his passions. In 1993 he began hosting his annual Academy Awards Party, which has become one of the highest-profile Oscar parties in the Hollywood film industry and has raised over US$200 million.

To raise money for his AIDS charity, John annually hosts a White Tie & Tiara Ball on the grounds of his home in Old Windsor in Berkshire, to which many celebrities are invited. The ninth annual White Tie & Tiara Ball took place on 28 June 2007. The menu consisted of a truffle soufflé followed by surf and turf and a giant knickerbocker glory ice cream. An auction followed, emceed by Stephen Fry. A Rolls-Royce "Phantom" drophead coupe and a piece of Tracey Emin's artwork both raised £800,000 for the charity fund, with the total amount raised reaching £3.5 million. Later, John sang "Delilah" with Tom Jones and "Big Spender" with Shirley Bassey. The 2011 guests included Prince Andrew's former wife Sarah Ferguson, Elizabeth Hurley and George Michael; the auction raised £5 million, adding to the £45 million the balls have raised for John's foundation. On 23 February 2023 The Elton John AIDS Foundation donated $125,000 via United24 to purchase ten biochemistry analysers, to help assure that all Ukrainians living with HIV can continue to access high-quality care and treatment.

=== Other charity work ===
John and Furnish founded the Elton John Charitable Trust in 2007, which has supported over 100 charities. In 2014 John launched the Elton John Sports Fund to help citizens with training and competition costs for over 50 sports. John performed "I'm Still Standing" during the One World: Together at Home television special, a benefit concert curated by Lady Gaga for Global Citizen to raise funds for the World Health Organization's COVID-19 Solidarity Response Fund.

== Artistry ==
=== Influences ===
John has said he remembers being immediately hooked on rock and roll when his mother brought home records by Elvis Presley and Bill Haley & His Comets in 1956. He also stated of when he was growing up: "I heard Little Richard and Jerry Lee Lewis, and that was it. I didn't ever want to be anything else. I'm more of a Little Richard stylist than a Jerry Lee Lewis, I think. Jerry Lee is a very intricate piano player and very skillful, but Little Richard is more of a pounder." John was inspired by keyboardists in the 1960s such as Zoot Money, Graham Bond, Georgie Fame, Rod Argent and Gary Brooker. He described Brian Wilson of the Beach Boys as "the biggest influence on my songwriting ever". He also cited Ray Charles, the Beatles, the Band, Leon Russell, Aretha Franklin, Joni Mitchell and Freddie Mercury as influences.

John has often expressed a great appreciation for the accomplishments of young artists from the 21st century, collaborating with several of them on the 2021 collaborative album The Lockdown Sessions and interviewing them on his Apple Music radio show Rocket Hour. He stated in an interview: "It's wonderful because you think, 'God, they're 16 or 17 or 15 years of age. How do they do that?' It keeps me animated and it keeps me so happy", and that "These are the kind of artists that keep me young. I listen to all new music, I know all the old music but it's the new music in life that keeps me inspired."

=== Musicianship ===
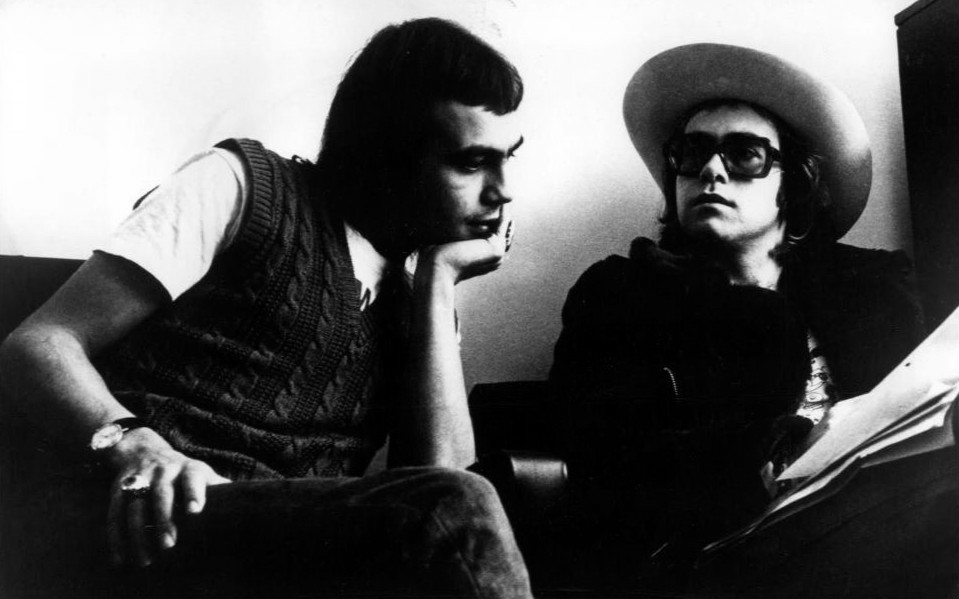
John with Bernie Taupin (left) in 1971. They have collaborated on more than thirty albums to date.

John has written with Bernie Taupin since 1967, when he answered an advertisement for talent placed in the popular UK music publication New Musical Express by Liberty Records A&R man Ray Williams. The pair have collaborated on more than 30 albums to date. Their method involves Taupin writing the lyrics on his own and sending them to John, who then writes music for them before recording the songs; the two are never in the same room during the process. In November 2017, John said of their 50-year partnership:

We've never ever had an argument professionally or personally, which is extraordinary because most songwriters sometimes split up because they get jealous of each other. And it's exciting because it's never changed from the first day we wrote songs. I still write the song when he's not there and then I go and play it to him. So the excitement is still the same as it was from day one and that's kept it fresh and it's kept it exciting.

In 1992, along with Taupin, John was inducted into the Songwriter's Hall of Fame. He is a fellow of the British Academy of Songwriters, Composers and Authors (BASCA). His voice was once classed as a tenor, but after his throat surgery is now a baritone. Emerging from the post-1960s singer-songwriter movement, John developed a pop rock, soft rock and glam rock musical style. While his songs mostly fall under two categories: the Beatles-esque pop and heavier rock, his piano playing is influenced by classical and gospel music. Paul Buckmaster even did orchestral arranging for his studio albums during the 1970s. John has also expressed interest in country, R&B and soul music, as well as experimenting with disco and synth-pop in the late 1970s and early 1980s, respectively.

== Awards and honours ==
Sir Elton John's coat of arms. Granted to him in 1987, the shield includes piano keys and records. The Spanish motto, el tono es bueno, combines a pun on Elton John's name with the translation "the tone is good". The black, red and gold colours are also those of Watford F.C. The steel helmet above the shield faced forward and with its visor open indicates that John is a knight.

In October 1975 John received a star on the Hollywood Walk of Fame. In 1992 he and Taupin were inducted into the Songwriters Hall of Fame. John was inducted into the Rock and Roll Hall of Fame in his first year of eligibility in 1994. John was appointed a Commander of the Order of the British Empire (CBE) in 1995. John was knighted by Elizabeth II on 24 February 1998, for services to music and to charity. In the 2020 New Year Honours he was appointed Member of the Order of the Companions of Honour (CH) by Elizabeth for services to music and to charity.

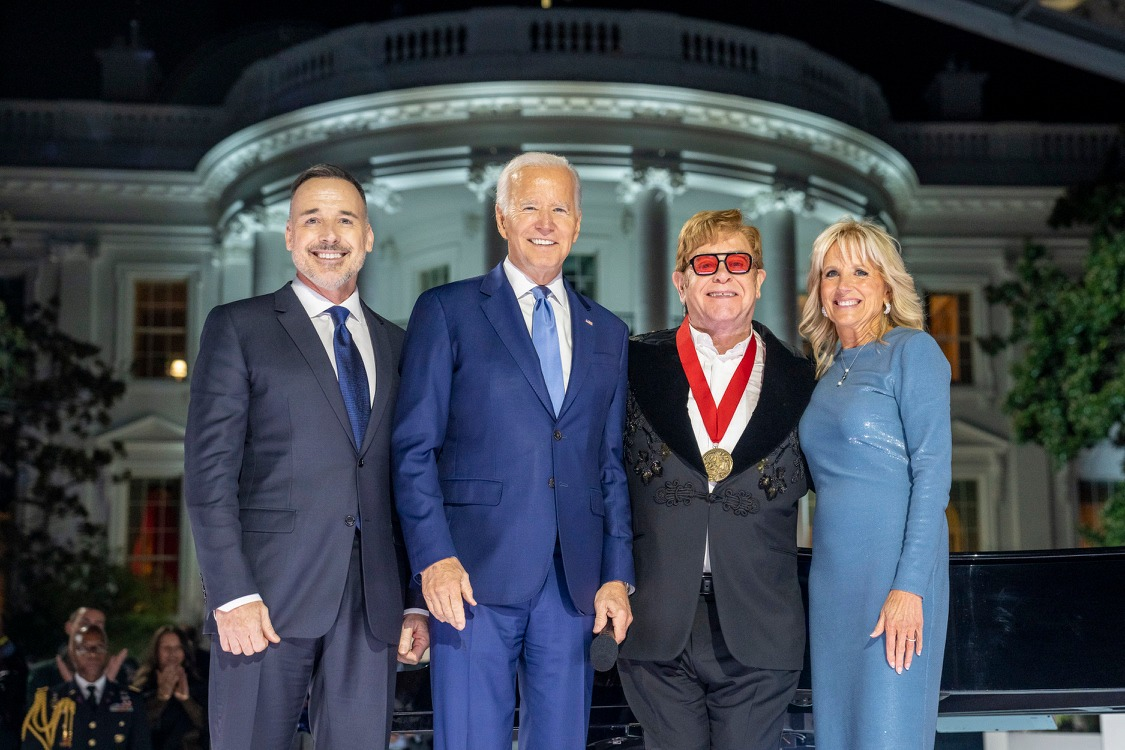
John after being awarded the US National Humanities Medal in September 2022, pictured with Furnish, Joe Biden and Jill Biden

John was awarded Society of Singers Lifetime Achievement Award in 2005. He received a Kennedy Center Honor in 2004 and a Disney Legends Award in 2006. In 2000, he was named the MusiCares Person of the Year for his artistic achievement in the music industry and dedication to philanthropy. In 2010 he received the PRS for Music Heritage Award, which was erected on the Namaste Lounge Pub in Northwood, London, where John performed his first gig. In 2019 President Emmanuel Macron appointed John a Chevalier of the Legion of Honour. In 2019 John was featured on a series of UK postage stamps issued by the Royal Mail. In 2022, after John performed at the White House, President Joe Biden surprised him by presenting him with the National Humanities Medal.

Music awards include the 1994 Academy Award and Golden Globe Award for Best Original Song for "Can You Feel the Love Tonight" from The Lion King, and the 2000 Tony Award for Best Original Score for Aida, all of which he shared with Tim Rice. The 2019 Golden Globe and Academy Award for Best Original Song both went to John for "(I'm Gonna) Love Me Again", shared with Taupin. He has also received five Brit Awards, including the 1991 award for Best British Male, and awards for Outstanding Contribution to Music in 1986 and 1995. In 2013 John received the first Brits Icon award in recognition of his "lasting impact" on British culture, which was presented to him by Rod Stewart. In 2024 John became the 19th person to achieve EGOT status after winning the Primetime Emmy Award for Outstanding Variety Special (Live) for Elton John: Farewell from Dodger Stadium. He was also named Time's 2024 Icon of the Year.

=== Rankings ===
- "Your Song" and "Bennie and the Jets" are listed in The Rock and Roll Hall of Fame's 500 Songs that Shaped Rock and Roll.
- In 2000 VH1's "100 Greatest Rock Songs" included "Your Song" at number 70.
- In 2003 Rolling Stone's "The 500 Greatest Albums of All Time" included Goodbye Yellow Brick Road at number 91, Greatest Hits at number 135, Captain Fantastic and the Brown Dirt Cowboy at number 158, Honky Chateau at number 357, Tumbleweed Connection at number 463 and Elton John at number 468.
- In 2004 Rolling Stone's "The 500 Greatest Songs of All Time" included "Your Song" at number 136, "Rocket Man" at number 242, "Candle in the Wind" (original) at number 347, "Goodbye Yellow Brick Road" at number 380 and "Tiny Dancer" at number 387.
- In 2004 Rolling Stone ranked John number 49 on their list of the "100 Greatest Artists of All Time".
- In 2010 John was ranked number 28 on VH1's "100 Greatest Artists of All Time".
- In 2013 Ultimate Classic Rock website ranked "Rocket Man" number 37 in their Top 100 Classic Rock Songs chart.
- In their 2019 list of the "Greatest Artists of All Time", Billboard ranked John the top solo artist in US chart history (third overall behind the Beatles and the Rolling Stones).
- In 2023 Rolling Stone ranked Elton John at number 100 on its list of the 200 Greatest Singers of All Time.

== Discography ==
- Empty Sky (1969)
- Elton John (1970)
- Tumbleweed Connection (1970)
- Madman Across the Water (1971)
- Honky Château (1972)
- Don't Shoot Me I'm Only the Piano Player (1973)
- Goodbye Yellow Brick Road (1973)
- Caribou (1974)
- Captain Fantastic and the Brown Dirt Cowboy (1975)
- Rock of the Westies (1975)
- Blue Moves (1976)
- A Single Man (1978)
- Victim of Love (1979)
- 21 at 33 (1980)
- The Fox (1981)
- Jump Up! (1982)
- Too Low for Zero (1983)
- Breaking Hearts (1984)
- Ice on Fire (1985)
- Leather Jackets (1986)
- Reg Strikes Back (1988)
- Sleeping with the Past (1989)
- The One (1992)
- Duets (with various artists) (1993)
- Made in England (1995)
- The Big Picture (1997)
- Songs from the West Coast (2001)
- Peachtree Road (2004)
- The Captain & the Kid (2006)
- The Union (with Leon Russell) (2010)
- The Diving Board (2013)
- Wonderful Crazy Night (2016)
- Regimental Sgt. Zippo (2021)
- The Lockdown Sessions (with various artists) (2021)
- Who Believes in Angels? (with Brandi Carlile) (2025)

== Selected filmography ==
- Born to Boogie, US (1972) as himself with Marc Bolan and Ringo Starr
- Tommy, UK (1975) as Pinball Wizard
- Elton John: Tantrums & Tiaras (1997) autobiography as himself
- Elton John: Me, Myself & I (2007) autobiography as himself
- Kingsman: The Golden Circle (2017) as himself
- Brian Wilson: Long Promised Road (2021) as himself
- If These Walls Could Sing (2022) as himself
- Elton John: Never Too Late (2024) autobiography as himself
- Spinal Tap II: The End Continues (2025) as himself

== See also ==
- List of British Grammy Award winners and nominees
