= 1980 World Tour =

1980 concert tour by Elton John

- Tour by Elton John
- Australian tour programme
- Location: North America; Oceania
- Associated album: 21 at 33
- Start date: 4 September 1980
- End date: 22 December 1980
- Legs: 2
- No. of shows: 46 in North America; 17 in Oceania; 63 in total

Elton John concert chronology
- A Single Man Tour (1979); 1980 World Tour (1980); Jump Up Tour (1982–83)

The 1980 World Tour was a concert tour by English musician and composer Elton John, in support of his 14th studio album 21 at 33. the tour included two legs (North America and Oceania) and a total of 63 shows.

== Tour ==
John's 1980 tour was unique for two reasons: it was the only tour he has ever done that had a guitarist in the band, but did not include Davey Johnstone, and it is the only time a band member (in this case drummer Nigel Olsson) has done songs from his solo career in the middle of a show. Olsson, who had rejoined John's band along with Dee Murray after six years, performed his own releases, "Saturday Night" and "All I Want Is You". And while Johnstone did make a guest appearance at one show (joining in on "Bite Your Lip (Get Up and Dance") at 6 November stop at The Forum in Los Angeles), he primarily was involved with Alice Cooper's career and had been replaced in John's band by two premiere session guitarists: Tim Renwick from England and American Richie Zito.

The new band did a private warm-up gig at the Palomino Club in Los Angeles on 25 August, exactly ten years to the day from his first American show at the nearby Troubadour. Then, with opening act Judie Tzuke, the tour moved across North America before landing with great fanfare at New York City's Central Park. There, on 13 September, John and the band played a free concert in front of an estimated 450,000 people. The show was highlighted by a cover of John Lennon's "Imagine" in the shadow of Lennon's apartment, and John's choice of costumes, including the "piano keys" outfit designed by Andre Miripolsky; he dressed as Donald Duck for the encores, in a costume designed by Bob Mackie. The Central Park show was recorded and broadcast as a concert special on HBO, and later released on home video. Clips from the show have been posted on Elton John's official website; however, to date no audio of the soundtrack has ever been officially released.

After the last United States show on 15 November in Honolulu, Hawaii, the tour concluded with 17 concerts in New Zealand and Australia, finishing at the Perth Entertainment Centre (as he had on the 1979 tour) on 22 December.

== Tour dates ==
Date	City	Country	Venue
North America
4 September 1980	Madison	United States	Dane County Coliseum
5 September 1980	Rosemont	United States	Rosemont Horizon
6 September 1980	Detroit	United States	Joe Louis Arena
7 September 1980	Toronto	Canada	Maple Leaf Gardens
8 September 1980	Toronto	Canada	Maple Leaf Gardens
9 September 1980	Montreal	Canada	Forum de Montréal
11 September 1980	Providence	United States	Providence Civic Center
12 September 1980	Hartford	United States	Hartford Civic Center
13 September 1980	New York City	United States	Central Park
16 September 1980	Baltimore	United States	Baltimore Civic Center
18 September 1980	Charlotte	United States	Charlotte Coliseum
19 September 1980	Columbia	United States	Carolina Coliseum
20 September 1980	Raleigh	United States	Reynolds Coliseum
23 September 1980	Hampton	United States	Hampton Coliseum
25 September 1980	Oxford	United States	Millett Hall
26 September 1980	Lexington	United States	Rupp Arena
27 September 1980	Indianapolis	United States	Market Square Arena
28 September 1980	Toledo	United States	Centennial Hall
29 September 1980	Richfield	United States	Richfield Coliseum
2 October 1980	West Lafayette	United States	Elliott Hall of Music
3 October 1980	Carbondale	United States	SIU Arena
4 October 1980	Champaign	United States	Assembly Hall
5 October 1980	Lincoln	United States	Bob Devaney Sports Center
7 October 1980	Tulsa	United States	Tulsa Convention Center
9 October 1980	Oklahoma City	United States	Myriad Convention Center
10 October 1980	Kansas City	United States	Kemper Arena
11 October 1980	Ames	United States	Hilton Coliseum
14 October 1980	Houston	United States	The Summit
15 October 1980	Austin	United States	Special Events Center
16 October 1980	Dallas	United States	Reunion Arena
18 October 1980	Denver	United States	McNichols Sports Arena
20 October 1980	Portland	United States	Portland Memorial Coliseum
21 October 1980	Seattle	United States	Seattle Center Coliseum
24 October 1980	Oakland	United States	Oakland–Alameda County Coliseum
26 October 1980	Tucson	United States	Tucson Convention Center
28 October 1980	Tempe	United States	ASU Activity Center
29 October 1980	San Diego	United States	San Diego Sports Arena
1 November 1980	Anaheim	United States	Anaheim Convention Center
2 November 1980	Anaheim	United States	Anaheim Convention Center
6 November 1980	Inglewood	United States	The Forum
7 November 1980	Inglewood	United States	The Forum
8 November 1980	Inglewood	United States	The Forum
9 November 1980	Inglewood	United States	The Forum
14 November 1980	Honolulu	United States	Neal S. Blaisdell Center
15 November 1980	Honolulu	United States	Neal S. Blaisdell Center
16 November 1980	Honolulu	United States	Neal S. Blaisdell Center
Oceania
22 November 1980	Auckland	New Zealand	Western Springs Stadium
26 November 1980	Wellington	New Zealand	Athletic Park
30 November 1980	Sydney	Australia	Hordern Pavilion
1 December 1980	Sydney	Australia	Hordern Pavilion
2 December 1980	Sydney	Australia	Hordern Pavilion
3 December 1980	Sydney	Australia	Hordern Pavilion
6 December 1980	Brisbane	Australia	Brisbane Festival Hall
7 December 1980	Brisbane	Australia	Brisbane Festival Hall
8 December 1980	Brisbane	Australia	Brisbane Festival Hall
11 December 1980	Melbourne	Australia	Festival Hall
12 December 1980	Melbourne	Australia	Festival Hall
13 December 1980	Melbourne	Australia	Festival Hall
16 December 1980	Adelaide	Australia	Memorial Drive Park
20 December 1980	Perth	Australia	Perth Entertainment Centre
21 December 1980	Perth	Australia	Perth Entertainment Centre
22 December 1980	Perth	Australia	Perth Entertainment Centre

== Set list ==
1. "Funeral for a Friend/Love Lies Bleeding"
2. "Tiny Dancer"
3. "Goodbye Yellow Brick Road"
4. "All the Girls Love Alice"
5. "Rocket Man"
6. "Sartorial Eloquence"
7. "Philadelphia Freedom"
8. "Sorry Seems to Be the Hardest Word"
9. "Saturday Night" (Nigel Olsson song)
10. "All I Want Is You" (Nigel Olsson song)
11. "Saturday Night's Alright for Fighting"
12. "Harmony"
13. "White Lady, White Powder"
14. "Little Jeannie"
15. "Bennie and the Jets"
16. "Imagine" (John Lennon song)
17. "Ego"
18. "Have Mercy on the Criminal"
19. "Someone Saved My Life Tonight"
20. "Your Song"
21. "Bite Your Lip"

== Personnel ==
- Elton John – lead vocals, piano
- Richie Zito – lead guitar, backing vocals
- Tim Renwick – rhythm guitar, backing vocals
- Dee Murray – bass guitar, backing vocals
- Nigel Olsson – drums, backing vocals
- James Newton Howard – keyboards, synthesizer, electric piano, backing vocals
