= To Be Continued... (Elton John album) =

Box set by Elton John
- Released: 8 November 1990
- Recorded: Various locations, 1965–1991
- Genres: Rock, pop rock
- Length: 301:20
- Labels: MCA (US); Rocket (UK)
- Producers: Gus Dudgeon (US); Chris Thomas, Elton John, Clive Franks, Don Was, Steve Brown (UK)

Elton John chronology
The Very Best of Elton John (1990)	To Be Continued... (1990)	The One (1992)

Alternate cover
- 1991 UK release

Professional ratings
Review scores
Source	Rating
AllMusic	4.5/5 stars
The Encyclopedia of Popular Music	4/5 stars

To Be Continued... is a four-disc box set by British musician Elton John, originally released in the United States on 8 November 1990, and released in the UK in November 1991. The box set was compiled by John and Bernie Taupin that same year. It details John's music from his days with Bluesology to the then-present day.

Aside from hit singles, the box set features deep cuts, unreleased music, fan favourites and live performances in John's career. Four new songs ("Made for Me", "You Gotta Love Someone", "I Swear I Heard the Night Talkin'" and "Easier to Walk Away") were recorded for the box set.

== Release ==
Newly sober Elton John was unhappy with the US cover art (it reminded him of his old excesses), so the 1991 UK release was issued with new cover art and also replaced "You Gotta Love Someone" (which had already been released on The Very Best of Elton John the previous year) and "I Swear I Heard the Night Talkin'" with then-unreleased "Suit of Wolves" and "Understanding Women". The former become one of the B-sides to "The One" and the latter was included as a track on the 1992 album The One.

MCA's rights to John's music lapsed in the 1990s, and the Elton John back catalogue was reverted to Polydor Records, which put it back out in upgraded editions on the Island Records label. This set was deleted by 1994, and was soon selling for serious amounts of money as a collector's item. However, in 1999, MCA's parent company, Universal Music, bought Polydor, and suddenly this box set reappeared.

In the US, it was certified gold in June 1992 and platinum in November 2006. In April 2016, it was certified 2 x platinum by the RIAA.

== Track listing ==
All songs written by Elton John and Bernie Taupin, except where noted.

Disc one (1968–1972)
No.	Title	Length
1.	"Come Back Baby" (Reg Dwight with Bluesology)	2:45
2.	"Lady Samantha"	3:04
3.	"It's Me That You Need"	4:04
4.	"Your Song" (Demo)	3:33
5.	"Rock and Roll Madonna"	4:17
6.	"Bad Side of the Moon"	3:15
7.	"Your Song"	4:00
8.	"Take Me to the Pilot"	3:46
9.	"Border Song"	3:22
10.	"Sixty Years On" (Extended intro)	4:57
11.	"Country Comfort"	5:07
12.	"Grey Seal" (Original version)	3:36
13.	"Friends"	2:20
14.	"Levon"	5:21
15.	"Tiny Dancer"	6:15
16.	"Madman Across the Water"	5:58
17.	"Honky Cat"	5:13
18.	"Mona Lisas and Mad Hatters"	4:59
Total length:		75:45

Disc two (1972–1975)
No.	Title	Writer(s)	Length
1.	"Rocket Man"		4:43
2.	"Daniel"		3:53
3.	"Crocodile Rock"		3:54
4.	"Bennie and the Jets"		5:21
5.	"Goodbye Yellow Brick Road"		3:14
6.	"All the Girls Love Alice"		5:10
7.	"Funeral for a Friend/Love Lies Bleeding"		11:07
8.	"Whenever You're Ready (We'll Go Steady Again)"		2:53
9.	"Saturday Night's Alright for Fighting"		4:54
10.	"Jack Rabbit"		1:51
11.	"Harmony"		2:46
12.	"Screw You (Young Man's Blues)"		4:43
13.	"Step into Christmas"		4:30
14.	"The Bitch Is Back"		3:44
15.	"Pinball Wizard"	Pete Townshend	5:15
16.	"Someone Saved My Life Tonight"		6:45
Total length:			74:38

Disc three (1975–1982)
No.	Title	Writer(s)	Length
1.	"Philadelphia Freedom"		5:39
2.	"One Day (At a Time)"	John Lennon	3:48
3.	"Lucy in the Sky with Diamonds"	Lennon, Paul McCartney	6:16
4.	"I Saw Her Standing There" (Live with John Lennon)	Lennon, McCartney	3:43
5.	"Island Girl"		3:44
6.	"Sorry Seems to Be the Hardest Word"		3:47
7.	"Don't Go Breaking My Heart" (with Kiki Dee)		4:31
8.	"I Feel Like a Bullet (In the Gun of Robert Ford)" (Live)		3:35
9.	"Ego"		3:59
10.	"Song for Guy"	John	6:40
11.	"Mama Can't Buy You Love"	LeRoy Bell, Casey James	4:03
12.	"Cartier"	Dinah Card, Carte Blanche	0:54
13.	"Little Jeannie"	John, Gary Osborne	5:12
14.	"Donner Pour Donner" (Duet with France Gall)	Michel Berger, Taupin	4:26
15.	"Fanfare/Chloe"	John, Osborne, James Newton Howard	6:20
16.	"The Retreat"		4:45
17.	"Blue Eyes"	John, Osborne	3:26
Total length:			74:41

Disc four (1982–1990) (US edition)
No.	Title	Writer(s)	Length
1.	"Empty Garden (Hey Hey Johnny)"		5:12
2.	"I Guess That's Why They Call It the Blues"	John, Taupin, Davey Johnstone	4:43
3.	"I'm Still Standing"		3:02
4.	"Sad Songs (Say So Much)" (Single version)		4:10
5.	"Act of War" (Single remix, duet with Millie Jackson)		4:44
6.	"Nikita"		5:44
7.	"Candle in the Wind" (Live at Australia 1986)		3:48
8.	"Carla/Etude" (Live at Australia 1986)	John	4:46
9.	"Don't Let the Sun Go Down on Me" (Live at Australia 1986)		5:39
10.	"I Don't Wanna Go On with You Like That" (Shep Pettibone remix)		7:18
11.	"Give Peace a Chance"	Lennon	3:47
12.	"Sacrifice"		5:08
13.	"Made for Me"		4:22
14.	"You Gotta Love Someone"		4:59
15.	"I Swear I Heard the Night Talking’"		4:30
16.	"Easier to Walk Away"		4:22
Total length:			76:21

Disc four (1982–1991) (UK edition)
No.	Title	Length
13.	"Made for Me"	4:22
14.	"Easier to Walk Away"	4:22
15.	"Suit of Wolves"	5:46
16.	"Understanding Women"	5:03
Total length:		78:10

== Personnel ==
From the 1990 Happenstance, Ltd release MCAD4-10110 liner notes

- Elton John - lead vocals and keyboards

CD 1

- guitar - Stuart Brown (1), Frank Clark (6–7)
- Caleb Quaye - guitar (2–3,5,12), lead guitar (8), acoustic guitar (11), electric guitar (14–15)
- Colin Green - guitar (6–7,9), Spanish guitar (10)
- Clive Hicks - 12-string guitar (7)
- Alan Parker - rhythm guitar (8)
- Les Thatcher - acoustic 12-string guitar (11), guitar (12), acoustic guitar (14)
- steel guitar - Gordon Huntley (11), B.J. Cole (15)
- Davey Johnstone - acoustic guitar (15–16), banjo (17), mandolin (18), guitar (18)
- Chris Spedding - electric guitar (16)
- Brian Dee - organ (9–10), harmonium (14)
- Diana Lewis - ARP synthesizer (16)
- Rick Wakeman - organ (16)
- bass - Rex Bishop (1), Tony Murray (2–3), Roger Glover (5,15), Alan Weighill (6,8,13), Dave Richmond (7,9), Herbie Flowers (11–12,16), Brian Odgers (14)
- drums - Mick Inkpen (1), Roger Pope (2–3,5,15), Barry Morgan (6–9,11–14), Terry Cox (16)
- percussion - Dennis Lopez (8), Ray Cooper (16)
- saxophone - Dave Murphy (1), Jean-Louis Chautemps (17), Alain Hatot (17)
- Jacques Bolognesi - trombone (17)
- Ivan Jullien - trumpet (17)
- Johnny Van Derek - violin (11)
- Ian Duck - harmonica (11)
- backing vocals - Madeline Bell (8–9), Lesley Duncan (8–9,14–15), Kay Garner (8–9), Tony Burrows (8–9,15), Tony Hazzard (8–9), Roger Cook (8–9,15), Sue and Sunny (14–15), Barry St. John (14–15), Liza Strike (14–15), Terry Steele (15)
- Dee Murray - backing vocals (11,15), bass (17–18)
- Nigel Olsson - backing vocals (11,15), drums (17)
- Barbara Moore - choir leader (9)
- Paul Buckmaster - arranged (6–10,12–16), conducted (13–16)

CD 2

- Davey Johnstone - guitar (1), backing vocals (1,5,7,15–16), acoustic guitar (2), electric guitar (3,14), guitars (4–13,15–16), mandolin (10)
- ARP synthesizer - David Hentschel (1,6–7), Ken Scott (2)
- Elton John - "flute" mellotron (2), ARP string ensemble synthesizer (16)
- Dee Murray - bass, backing vocals (1,5,7,15–16), phased pignose bass (14)
- Nigel Olsson - drums, backing vocals (1,5,7,15–16), maracas (2), car effects (6)
- Ray Cooper - tambourine (6,14–16), percussion (13), congas (15), shaker (16), cymbal (16)
- Tower of Power Horn Section - brass (14)
- Lenny Pickett - tenor sax solo (14)
- backing vocals - Kiki Dee (6), Clydie King (14), Sherlie Adams (14), Jessie Mae Smith (14), Dusty Springfield (14)
- Del Newman - orchestral arrangement (5)
- Greg Adams - bass arrangement (14)

CD 3

- Davey Johnstone - guitar (1–4), sitar (3), backing vocals (3,5), Ovation guitar (5), slide guitar (5), banjo (5), electric guitar (7)
- Caleb Quaye - acoustic guitar (5), backing vocals (5)
- Reggae Guitars of Dr. Winston O'Boogie - guitars (3)
- guitar - Tim Renwick (9), Bobby Eli (11), Tony Bell (11), Steve Lukather (17)
- Richie Zito - acoustic guitars (13), guitar (14[probably],18)
- guitar overdubs - Casey Jones (11), Leroy M. Bell (11)
- Elton - Mellotron (3,10), Polymoog (10), Salena string synthesizer (10), backing vocals (13)
- James Newton Howard - ARP synthesizer (5), Mellotron solo (5), electric piano (6–7,18), string arrangements (6), orchestral arrangements (7), Fender Rhodes (13,16), Yamaha cs80 (13), synthesizers (15,18)
- Thom Bell - keyboards (11)
- David Paich - organ (17)
- Carl Fortina - accordion (6)
- Muscle Shoals Horns (4)
- MFSB - strings and horns (11)
- Jim Horn - alto sax (13), piccolo (13), brass arrangement (13)
- Chuck Findley - trumpet (13), trombone (13)
- Jerry Hey - flugelhorn (13)
- Dee Murray - bass (1–4,18), backing vocals (3,13–14,16)
- Kenny Passarelli - bass (5–7), backing vocals (5)
- bass - Clive Franks (9–10), Bob Babbitt (11), Reggie McBride (13,16–17)
- Nigel Olsson - drums (1–4,13–14), backing vocals (3)
- drums - Roger Pope (5,7), Steve Holley (9), Charles Collins (11), Alvin Taylor (16–17), Jeff Porcaro (18)
- Rhythmbox - Rhythmbox (10)
- Rhythm Ace - itself (13)
- Ray Cooper - percussion (1–2,9), tambourine (3,5), gong (3), congas (5), marimba (5), vibes (6,8), wind chimes (10), shakers (10)
- Lenny Castro - congas (14)
- percussion - Larry Washington (11), Victor Feldman (14–16)
- John Lennon - vocal harmonies (2), vocals (4)
- Kiki Dee - backing vocals (5), vocals (7)
- backing vocals - Ann Orson (5), The Spinners (11), Bill Champlin (13,16), Max Groenthal (13,16), Gary Osborne (16)
- France Gall - vocals (14)
- Gene Page - orchestral arrangement (1–2)
- London Symphony Orchestra arranged and conducted by James Newton Howard (15)
- Strings arranged by James Newton Howard and Marty Paich (16)
- Strings conducted by James Newton Howard (16)
- Strings and brass arranged by James Newton Howard (18)

CD 4

- James Newton Howard - synthesizer (1,13,16), electric piano (1), string arranging (13,15–16), Synclavier (15)
- Elton - vocal synthesizer (6), backing vocals (6,10), harmonies (10)
- keyboards - Guy Babylon (12), David Paich (14)
- Dee Murray - bass (1–4), backing vocals (2–4,10)
- bass - Deon Estus (5), David Paton (6–10), Romeo Williams (12), Randy Jackson (13–16)
- Nigel Olsson - drums (2–4), backing vocals (2–4,10)
- drums - Jeff Porcaro (1), Mel Gaynor (5), Dave Mattacks (6), Charles Morgan (7–10), Jonathan Moffett (12), Kenny Aronoff (13–16)
- Gus Dudgeon - Simmons drums (5)
- Davey Johnstone - guitars (2–5,10–12), backing vocals (2–4,6,10), lead guitar (7–9)
- guitars - Richie Zito (1), Nik Kershaw (5–6), Paul Jackson, Jr. (13,16), Steve Lukather (13–14), Michael Landau (14–16), Waddy Wachtel (15)
- Fred Mandel - guitar (5), Yamaha DX (5), Juniper 8 (5), synthesizers (6–10), keyboards (7–9,12)
- Stevie Wonder - harmonica (2)
- Millie Jackson - vocals (5)
- backing vocals - George Michael (6), Shirley Lewis (9), Alan Carval (9), Gordon Neville (9), Natelle Jackson (13), Mortonnete Jenkins (13), Marlena Jeter (13), Julia Waters (14), Oren Waters (14), Maxine Waters (14), Phyllis Yvonne Williams (14), Carmen Twilie (14), Mona Lisa Young (14), Sweet Pea Atkinson (14,16), Donald Ray Mitchell (14,16), David Lasley (16), Sir Harry Bowens (16)
- percussion - Jody Linscott (7–9), Ray Cooper (7–9), Paulinho Da Costa (14)
- Strings and brass arranged by James Newton Howard (1)
- Melbourne Symphony Orchestra conducted by James Newton Howard (7–9)
- Robert John - leader/concertmaster (7–9)
- Michael Mason - Synclavier programming (13,15–16)

== Certifications ==
Region	Certification	Certified units/sales
Canada (Music Canada)	Gold	50,000^{^}
United States (RIAA)	2× Platinum	2,000,000^{^}
^{^} Shipments figures based on certification alone.
