= The Very Best of Elton John =

Compilation album by Elton John
- Released: 29 October 1990
- Recorded: 1970–1990
- Genres: Rock; pop
- Length: 137:56
- Label: Rocket
- Producers: Gus Dudgeon; Clive Franks; Chris Thomas; Don Was

Elton John chronology
Sleeping with the Past (1989)	The Very Best of Elton John (1990)	To Be Continued... (1990)

Singles from The Very Best of Elton John
- 1. "You Gotta Love Someone" Released: 8 October 1990; 2. "Easier to Walk Away" Released: November 1990

Professional ratings
Review scores
Source	Rating
AllMusic	4.5/5 stars
The Encyclopedia of Popular Music	5/5 stars

The Very Best of Elton John is a greatest hits compilation album by British musician Elton John, released by The Rocket Record Company in October 1990. His first career-retrospective compilation album, and fourth official greatest-hits album overall, it was released in the United Kingdom and throughout Europe, and in other countries such as Japan and Australia, but not in the United States, where the box set To Be Continued... was released the following month instead.

The compilation spans his second album Elton John in 1970 to Sleeping with the Past in 1989. After the double A-sided "Sacrifice"/"Healing Hands" single became a hit and the third best-selling single of 1990 in the United Kingdom, the album became an instant smash in that country. It spent its first two weeks at number one on the UK Albums Chart followed by nine weeks at number two, kept there by Madonna's Immaculate Collection. In all, the compilation spent 145 weeks inside the UK top 200 album chart, making a total of 11 re-entries, and it was certified 9× Platinum by the BPI on 1 March 1995.

It includes a total of 28 hit singles plus the new songs "Easier to Walk Away" and "You Gotta Love Someone", both of which also made the charts between 1990 and 1991. The release also spawned a music video compilation, which was originally released on both laserdisc and VHS, and reissued on DVD.

== Track listing ==
All tracks are written by Elton John and Bernie Taupin, except where noted.

Disc one
No.	Title	Writer(s)	Original release	Length
1.	"Your Song"		Elton John, 1970	4:03
2.	"Rocket Man (I Think It's Going To Be a Long, Long Time)"		Honky Château, 1972	4:42
3.	"Honky Cat"		Honky Château	5:15
4.	"Crocodile Rock"		Don't Shoot Me I'm Only the Piano Player, 1973	3:58
5.	"Daniel"		Don't Shoot Me I'm Only the Piano Player	3:56
6.	"Goodbye Yellow Brick Road"		Goodbye Yellow Brick Road, 1973	3:17
7.	"Saturday Night's Alright for Fighting"		Goodbye Yellow Brick Road	4:57
8.	"Candle in the Wind"		Goodbye Yellow Brick Road	3:51
9.	"Don't Let the Sun Go Down on Me"		Caribou, 1974	5:38
10.	"Lucy in the Sky with Diamonds" (The Beatles cover)	Lennon–McCartney	Non-album single, 1974	6:17
11.	"Philadelphia Freedom"		Non-album single, 1975	5:42
12.	"Someone Saved My Life Tonight"		Captain Fantastic and the Brown Dirt Cowboy, 1975	6:47
13.	"Pinball Wizard" (The Who cover) (not on vinyl)	Pete Townshend	Tommy soundtrack, 1975	5:16
14.	"The Bitch Is Back" (not on vinyl)		Caribou	3:46

Disc two
No.	Title	Writer(s)	Original release	Length
15.	"Don't Go Breaking My Heart" (with Kiki Dee)	Ann Orson; Carte Blanche	Non-album single, 1976	4:32
16.	"Bennie and the Jets"		Goodbye Yellow Brick Road	5:21
17.	"Sorry Seems to Be the Hardest Word"		Blue Moves, 1976	3:51
18.	"Song for Guy"	John	A Single Man, 1978	6:41
19.	"Part-Time Love"	John; Gary Osborne	A Single Man	3:16
20.	"Blue Eyes"	John; Osborne	Jump Up!, 1982	3:28
21.	"I Guess That's Why They Call It the Blues"	John; Taupin; Davey Johnstone	Too Low for Zero, 1983	4:46
22.	"I'm Still Standing"		Too Low for Zero	3:04
23.	"Kiss the Bride"		Too Low for Zero	3:56
24.	"Sad Songs (Say So Much)" (single version)		Breaking Hearts, 1984	4:11
25.	"Passengers"	John; Taupin; Johnstone; Phineas Mkhize	Breaking Hearts	3:24
26.	"Nikita"		Ice on Fire, 1985	5:45
27.	"I Don't Wanna Go On with You Like That" (not on vinyl)		Reg Strikes Back, 1988	4:00
28.	"Sacrifice"		Sleeping with the Past, 1989	5:08
29.	"Easier to Walk Away" (not on vinyl)		Soon to be released on To Be Continued..., 1990	4:25
30.	"You Gotta Love Someone"		Days of Thunder soundtrack, 1990	5:01

- Ann Orson and Carte Blanche in track 15 are pseudonyms of Elton John and Bernie Taupin, respectively.
- Track 25 is different on European version of the album. "Whispers" from Sleeping with the Past takes the place of "Passengers".
- "Pinball Wizard", "The Bitch Is Back", "I Don't Wanna Go On with You Like That" and "Easier to Walk Away" are excised from the vinyl version of the compilation.
- For track 15, information about performance with Kiki Dee is not provided in the release.
- The durations are different on the back cover and the actual CD. On Disc 1, "Don't Let the Sun Go Down on Me" is listed as 6:12, while the actual song runs at 5:38 and "Philadelphia Freedom" runs at 5:42, rather than 5:19. On Disc 2, the back cover lists "Song for Guy" as 5:02, but the actual track runs at 6:40 (the album length of the song). The same applies for "Nikita", which the back cover states for 4:53 but the actual song plays at 5:44. "I Don't Wanna Go On with You Like That" is the radio single edit (4:00) instead of the back cover's album cut listing of 4:33.

== B-sides ==
Song	Format
"Medicine Man"	"You Gotta Love Someone" 7"/12"/CD (UK)
"Medicine Man" (with Adamski)	"You Gotta Love Someone" 12"/CD (UK)
"Made for Me"	"Easier to Walk Away" 12"/CD (UK)
"I Swear I Heard the Night Talkin'"	"Easier to Walk Away" 7"/12"/CD (UK) "You Gotta Love Someone" 7" (France)

== Music video compilation ==
1. "Your Song" (Top of the Pops 1971 live version)
2. "Daniel" (Top of the Pops 1973 live version)
3. "Goodbye Yellow Brick Road" (Top of the Pops 1973 live version)
4. "Don't Go Breaking My Heart" (with Kiki Dee)
5. "Sorry Seems to Be the Hardest Word" (BBC Live Christmas Show version)
6. "Rocket Man (I Think It's Going to Be a Long Long Time)" (live at Wembley 1977 version)
7. "Blue Eyes"
8. "I Guess That's Why They Call It the Blues"
9. "I'm Still Standing"
10. "Kiss the Bride"
11. "Sad Songs (Say So Much)"
12. "Passengers"
13. "Nikita"
14. "Wrap Her Up"
15. "Candle in the Wind" (live in Australia 1986 version)
16. "Saturday Night's Alright for Fighting" (live in Prince's Trust 1987 version)
17. "I Don't Wanna Go On with You Like That"
18. "Philadelphia Freedom" (live in Verona 1989 version)
19. "Sacrifice"
20. "You Gotta Love Someone"

== Charts ==
=== Weekly charts ===
Chart (1990–1991)	Peak position
Australian Albums (ARIA)	1
Austrian Albums (Ö3 Austria)	1
Dutch Albums (Album Top 100)	5
Finnish Albums (The Official Finnish Charts)	3
French Albums (SNEP)	1
German Albums (Offizielle Top 100)	2
Italian Albums (Musica e Dischi)	1
New Zealand Albums (RMNZ)	1
Norwegian Albums (VG-lista)	1
Portuguese Albums (AFP)	1
Spain (Spanish Albums Chart)	1
Swedish Albums (Sverigetopplistan)	1
Swiss Albums (Schweizer Hitparade)	1
UK Albums (Official Charts)	1

Chart (1995–1996)	Peak position
Belgian Albums (Ultratop Flanders)	28
Belgian Albums (Ultratop Wallonia)	17
Hungarian Albums (MAHASZ)	19

=== Year-end charts ===
Chart (1991)	Peak position
Australian Albums (ARIA)	11
Austrian Albums (Ö3 Austria)	2
Dutch Albums (Album Top 100)	79
German Albums (Offizielle Top 100)	11
New Zealand Albums (RMNZ)	20
Swiss Albums (Schweizer Hitparade)	5

Chart (1995)	Peak position
Belgian Albums (Ultratop Flanders)	53
Dutch Albums (Album Top 100)	41

== Certifications and sales ==
Region	Certification	Certified units/sales
Australia (ARIA)	6× Platinum	420,000^{^}
Austria (IFPI Austria)	3× Platinum	150,000^{*}
Belgium (BRMA)	3× Platinum	150,000^{*}
Brazil (Pro-Música Brasil)	Gold	100,000^{*}
Finland (Musiikkituottajat)	Gold	25,000
France (SNEP)	Diamond	2,300,000
Germany (BVMI)	2× Platinum	1,000,000^{^}
Italy (FIMI)	Platinum	450,000
Netherlands (NVPI)	2× Platinum	200,000^{^}
New Zealand (RMNZ)	Platinum	15,000^{^}
Norway (IFPI Norway)	Platinum	100,000
Spain (Promusicae)	3× Platinum	300,000^{^}
Sweden (GLF)	Platinum	100,000^{^}
Switzerland (IFPI Switzerland)	4× Platinum	200,000^{^}
United Kingdom (BPI)	9× Platinum	2,700,000^{^}
^{*} Sales figures based on certification alone.^{^} Shipments figures based on certification alone.
