= Jerk off (disambiguation) =

Jerking off is a form of manual masturbation. It may also refer to:

- "Jerk Off", a song by Tool from Opiate
- "Jamaica Jerk-Off", a song by Elton John from Goodbye Yellow Brick Road
- Jerk off instruction, a genre of porn
