= 21 at 33 =

Studio album by Elton John
- Released: 23 May 1980
- Recorded: August 1979–March 1980
- Studios: Super Bear Studios (Nice); Rumbo Recorders (Los Angeles) (Note: Choir on "Dear God"); Sunset Sound Recorders (Los Angeles) (Note: "White Lady White Powder" and all overdubs)
- Genre: Rock
- Length: 42:53
- Labels: Rocket; MCA
- Producers: Elton John; Clive Franks

Elton John chronology
Victim of Love (1979)	21 at 33 (1980)	The Fox (1981)

Singles from 21 at 33
- 1. "Little Jeannie" Released: April 1980; 2. "Sartorial Eloquence" Released: July 1980; 3. "Dear God" Released: November 1980

21 at 33 is the fourteenth studio album by British musician Elton John. It was released on 23 May 1980, through MCA Records in the US and The Rocket Record Company in all other territories. The album was co-produced by John and Clive Franks, and was primarily recorded in August 1979 at Super Bear Studios in Nice, France. The record was the first since Blue Moves (1976) to feature lyrics written by Bernie Taupin (who contributed to three songs), while John also continued to collaborate with other lyricists, including Gary Osborne and Tom Robinson. Contributors to the album include members of Toto and the Eagles, as well as Dee Murray and Nigel Olsson, marking their first appearance on an Elton John album since Captain Fantastic and the Brown Dirt Cowboy (1975).

The title 21 at 33 was chosen as it was John's 21st album release overall and came out when he was 33 years old. (Note: While Elton had only released fourteen studio albums at this time, this number also takes into account other releases such as live albums and compilations.) Upon release, the album was a moderate success, reaching the top 20 on both the US Billboard 200 and the UK Albums Chart and proving far more successful than his previous effort Victim of Love (1979). The record's lead single, "Little Jeannie", peaked at number three on the US Billboard Hot 100, while it stalled at number 33 on the UK singles chart. Critical reception was relatively warm, although some criticized the record as inconsistent and lacking cohesion. To promote the album, John embarked on a tour of North America and Oceania, including a free concert in Central Park. 21 at 33 has since been certified Gold by the RIAA for US sales in excess of 500,000 copies.

== Background ==
After the release of Blue Moves in 1976, Elton John and Bernie Taupin put their partnership on hold, with the both of them working with other acts. On A Single Man (1978), John would collaborate with lyricist Gary Osborne for the first time, while Taupin co-wrote Alice Cooper's 1978 album From the Inside. While John's albums still sold well, his new releases did not match the success of his early-1970s work, with A Single Man only reaching number 8 on the UK Albums Chart and number 15 on the US Billboard 200. In 1979, John would release the album Victim of Love, a move into disco on which he did not compose or play piano on any of the material, providing only vocals. The album was a flop, receiving the worst reviews of his career and stalling at number 35 in the US and number 41 in the UK. Also in 1979, John travelled to the Soviet Union to play a series of concerts with percussionist Ray Cooper.

== Writing and recording ==
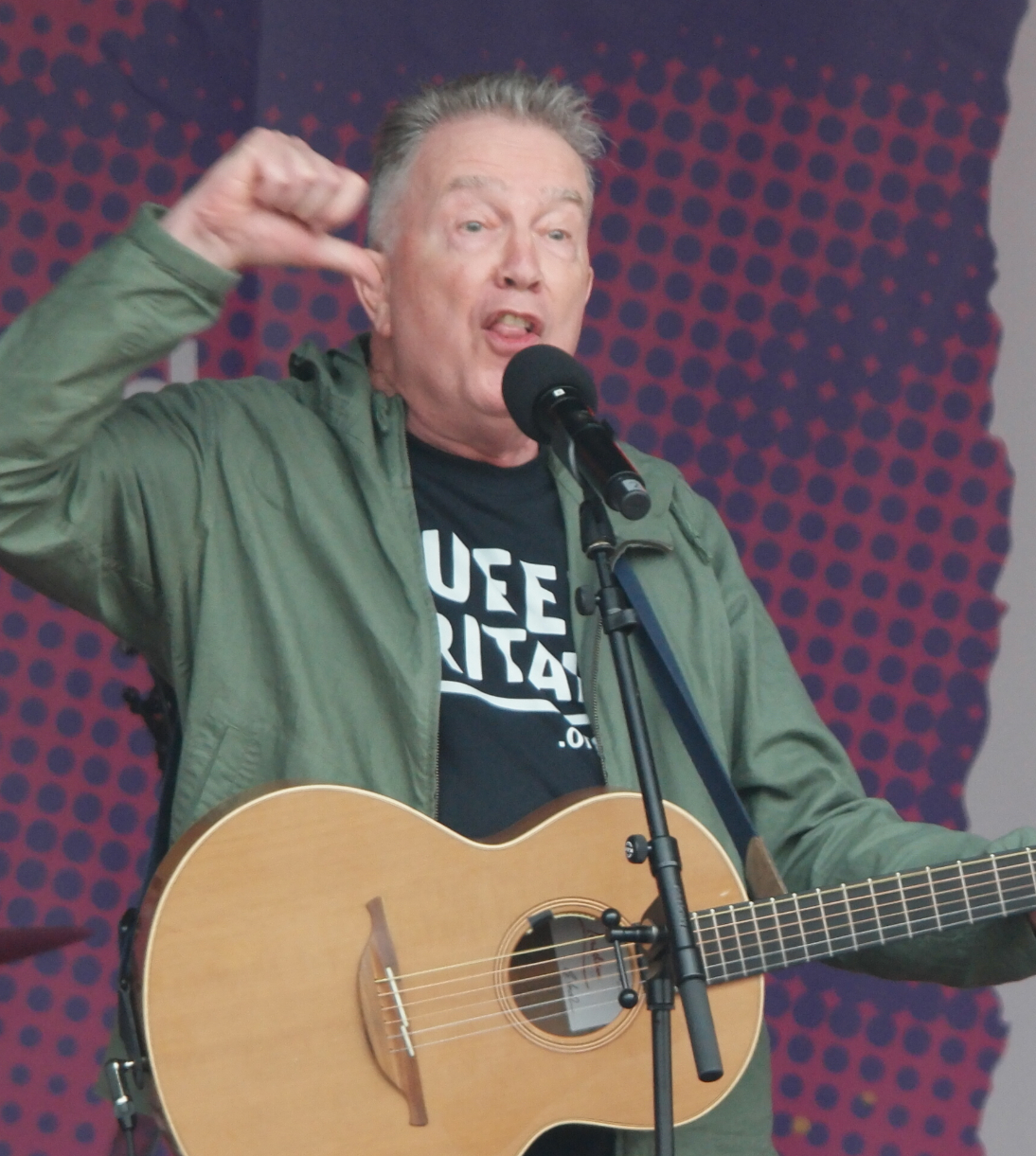
21 at 33 contained John's first collaborations with singer-songwriter Tom Robinson (pictured here in 2019).

The writing of 21 at 33 marked the beginning of a tentative reunion between John and Taupin. The majority of the album's material was written in August 1979 in Grasse, France, to which John invited Taupin and his wife to join him. John and Taupin wrote ten songs together during this period, three of which would appear on the album. In addition to Taupin, John continued to write with Osborne, as well as with two new collaborators, Tom Robinson and Judie Tzuke. Robinson had already found success with his Tom Robinson Band and hits such as "2-4-6-8 Motorway" (1977) and the gay pride anthem "Glad to Be Gay" (1978), while Tzuke was a Rocket signee who had a UK top 20 hit with "Stay with Me till Dawn" in 1979. At one point, John considered making 21 at 33 a double album, though it was ultimately reduced to a single due to Clive Franks' belief that there was not a sufficient amount of quality material for a double. Most of the basic tracks for the album were recorded at Super Bear Studios in Nice in August 1979, while overdubs, as well as the track "White Lady White Powder", were recorded at Sunset Sound Recorders in early 1980. Additionally, a choir was recorded for "Dear God" at Rumbo Recorders in February 1980. Technical problems marred the sessions in Nice; in Elton: The Biography by David Buckley, co-producer Clive Franks recalls an incident in which a mixing console ignited on fire.

Musicians on the album included Nigel Olsson and Dee Murray, both of whom made their first appearance on an Elton John album in five years. Other musicians appearing on the album include guitarists Steve Lukather (of Toto) and Richie Zito, as well as Don Henley, Timothy B. Schmit and Glenn Frey, all members of the Eagles, who contributed backing vocals to "White Lady White Powder". Olsson's involvement in recording began when he was invited to Sunset Sound to overdub a drum track on "Little Jeannie", as John (who, at one point, considered scrapping the song entirely) was unsatisfied with the original drum part performed by Alvin Taylor. As Murray was living in Los Angeles at the time, he was also called in to contribute to the track, on which he provided backing vocals. Olsson and Murray would also end up providing the rhythm section for "White Lady White Powder", the last track recorded for the album. Judie Tzuke's contribution to the album was its closing track, "Give Me the Love". John sent Tzuke the music as well as the title, and she wrote a large amount of lyrics, telling him to "use whatever [he] like[d]." Tom Robinson's contributions consisted of "Sartorial Eloquence" (released as the album's second single) and "Never Gonna Fall in Love Again".

== Composition ==
In contrast with the previous year's Victim of Love, 21 at 33 sees John return to a more conventional pop and rock sound. Judy Parkinson, author of Elton: Made in England, describes the album as having a "contemporary electronic sound" due to its use of synthesizers and electric piano. The album opens with "Chasing the Crown", a John–Taupin composition. Elizabeth Rosenthal, author of His Song: The Musical Journey of Elton John, notes elements of gospel present within the song, combined with "the loud colors of rock aggression". Additionally, she describes John's piano part as a "scaled-down adaptation of some of the peppery chord patterns he had incorporated into "[I Heard It Through the] Grapevine" during his 1979 world tour", while "the melodious screeching of Steve Lukather's guitar sifts through the chords." Lyrically, Rosenthal considers the song to be a "close lyrical cousin" to "Sympathy for the Devil" (1968) by the Rolling Stones, with both songs being "engaging puzzles in which the listener is invited to identify a culprit who has caused conflict and misery." "Little Jeannie" is a midtempo ballad which Buckley believes shares similarities to John's earlier hit "Daniel" (1973). The song was written with Osborne, who has described its lyrics as portraying "a girl who was beautiful but didn't realise her own worth, a woman who would sleep around because of her low self-esteem." Rosenthal describes "Little Jeannie" as a song "about love of a higher order, sung from the perspective of a man without the most pristine values, whose life has been transformed by the pure and idealistic young Jeannie." Rather than playing the part himself, John had James Newton Howard provide the song's prominent Fender Rhodes electric piano, due to John feeling Newton Howard possessed better technique on the instrument. The song's coda, featuring Murray (among others) on backing vocals, contains a melody similar to that of "When I Need You", which had been a number one hit for Leo Sayer in 1977.

Rosenthal describes "Sartorial Eloquence", the first of two John–Robinson songs on the album, as an "expression of homosexual longing" with the "object of affection" being a "stylishly dressed, emotionally unrevealing man, who prefers to leave an intense affair for other pleasures down the road." The song begins with a spare arrangement consisting solely of John's voice and piano, before "grow[ing] in volume and despondency" with the introduction of additional musicians and vocalists, climaxing with a chorus of "don't you wanna play this game no more?" Rosenthal interprets the song's sudden ending as representing "the departure of the well-dressed man for untapped wells of excitement." "Two Rooms at the End of the World" was written with Taupin and comments on the nature of his and John's partnership. Its title refers to the duo's unique tendency to write in different locations, rather than collaborating, and asserts that despite their break, their relationship remained strong, with Buckley stating the song's main theme is that "the distance that separated them was a physical, not emotional one." Shana Naomi Krochmal of Vulture describes the track as "an epic assertion of Bernie and Elton's lifelong partnership, break be damned." The song features John on electric piano and Lukather on guitar, while the instrumentation continues to build throughout the song, including the addition of a brass arrangement by Jim Horn and multiple layers of overdubbed backing vocals.

"White Lady White Powder", which opens side two, is the third and final John–Taupin song on the album. The lyrics were written about John's drug addiction, with John later stating: "Sometimes the lyrics he gave me were quite pointed. You didn't have to be a genius to work out what he was driving at when he sent me a song called 'White Lady White Powder.'" He also remarked that he "had the brass balls to sing it as if was about someone else." Rosenthal notes that the lyrics "itemize the reasons Elton himself had grown fond of the drug", while also calling the track "an exercise in irony" due to music which she likens to "a jolly nursery rhyme, complete with happy piano chords just right for frolicking children." Henley, Frey, and Schmidt provide backing vocals on the song. "Dear God" features choir vocals performed by, among others, Bruce Johnston of the Beach Boys and Toni Tennille. Rosenthal notes its lyrics as conflicting with John's "religious skepticism", while also opining that the song "sounds not only right for church, but as if it had already been played to death for decades." Krochmal describes the track as "a musically beautiful ballad that makes almost no sense in the context of Elton John's life in 1980."

Rosenthal believes that "Never Gonna Fall in Love Again", the album's second co-write with Robinson, starts off describing "someone half-seriously lamenting an overabundance of casual infatuation with members of the opposite sex." However, she notes a "clever twist" within the second verse, which "uncovers the sexual orientation of the protagonist's infatuations" with the line "'Cause everywhere there's lots of foxes / and every cat I meet's a Tom". The vocal delivery is described as fitting of a "love ballad", with an "intimate but slippery" melody. "Take Me Back" is a country-influenced song with John using a Wurlitzer electric piano and Byron Berline guesting on fiddle. Rosenthal notes the use of "Elton's best cowboy voice, complete with minute vocal flips and the pointiest vocal twang probably ever heard in Nice." "Give Me the Love", the album closer and the only track written with Tzuke is, according to Rosenthal, suggestive of a "mini love epic in musical form". She likens the track to John's earlier single "Philadelphia Freedom" (1975), as they both "combine the lilt of soul with the infectious beat of a disco number and the immediacy of rock."

== Release and reception ==
"Little Jeannie" was released as the album's lead single in April 1980. The single debuted on the Billboard Hot 100 on 3 May 1980 at number 65 before moving into the top 40 within its second week. By 7 June, the song entered the top 10 and reached its peak of number three the week of 19 July. This made it the highest-charting Elton John song to be co-written by Osborne, as well as John's biggest American hit in years. Additionally, the song had a longer stay in the US top 10 than any of John's previous singles. "Little Jeannie" charted even higher on the Billboard Adult Contemporary chart, where it reached number one, making it his fifth chart-topper. It was less successful in the UK, where it stalled at number 33 on the UK singles chart. "Sartorial Eloquence" was chosen as the album's second single and was released in August 1980; it was given the subtitle of "Don't Ya Wanna Play This Game No More?" in the US. Contained on the flipside of the single were two previously unreleased tracks, "Cartier" and "White Man Danger". By the time it charted, on 9 August, "Little Jeannie" was still in its peak position. "Sartorial Eloquence" was not as successful as its predecessor, only reaching number 39 in the US and number 44 in the UK. "Dear God" was released as the album's third and final single (in two versions, a standard pressing with one B-side and a "deluxe" edition with two more) in the UK that November and failed to chart.

21 at 33 was released on 23 May 1980. The album debuted on the Billboard Top LPs and Tape chart on 31 May 1980, and would eventually reach a peak of number 13, his highest chart placement since Blue Moves. It became his sixteenth gold record, gaining the certification on 22 September 1980. In the UK, the album reached number 12, becoming the second album (along with Victim of Love) of John's to not reach the top 10 since Madman Across the Water (1971).

=== Critical reception ===
Professional ratings
Review scores
Source	Rating
AllMusic	3/5 stars
The Encyclopedia of Popular Music	2/5 stars
Record Mirror	4/5 stars
Smash Hits	7/10

21 at 33 received moderately positive reviews from critics. Writing for Smash Hits, Ian Cranna gave the album a 7 out of 10 rating and declared it John's best since Goodbye Yellow Brick Road (1973). While stating the album "never reach[es] jackpot status", he praised it as "melodically strong" and "musically light", complimenting Taupin's lyrics as "powerful", Robinson's as "personal", and calling Tzuke's contribution a "strong ballad". Cranna criticized Osborne's lyrics as "dreadful Song Contest efforts." In a review for Record Mirror, Robin Smith awarded the album four stars out of five, declaring it a comeback after the "lethargy of his last dire effort." Smith credited Taupin's return with "putting back the sharp lines that ha[d] been lacking" in John's recent albums. Billboard made 21 at 33 their "spotlight" album pick for the week ending 24 May 1980, calling it John's most "significant and pleasing" album since Blue Moves. The publication praised the record for containing "melodic pop offerings with the melodic and lyrical depth that made him [John] a '70s superstar", rather than the "disco and R&B" experiments of his late 70s work.

Writing for Rolling Stone, Ken Tucker praised the album's first side, while disparaging the second. He praised "Little Jeannie" as a "sweet midtempo ballad" sharing similarities with Goodbye Yellow Brick Road, and declared "Chasing the Crown" and "Two Rooms at the End of the World" to be "the neatest, most cogent rockers that Taupin and John have done in a long time." He believed the album "falls apart" with its second side, criticizing the subject matter of "White Lady White Powder" and "Dear God" while characterizing the last three tracks as "slow, dull and boring".

Some writers have criticized the album as inconsistent and lacking cohesion due to its large number of co-writers. In a retrospective review for AllMusic, Lindsay Planer felt the album exhibits a "scattered nature", criticizing the John–Taupin tracks for containing what he feels is a "nauseating disco vibe" similar to that of Victim of Love while praising the John-Osborne collaborations as well as "Sartorial Eloquence". Buckley writes that due to the number of co-writers present, 21 at 33 "lack[s] the sort of thematic unity of style and content that ma[kes] the best Elton John albums click." Much like Tucker, he praises the album's first half, feeling it contains "some of the strongest material Elton had made for years", while its second side "failed to sparkle".

=== Promotion and aftermath ===
To promote the album, Elton embarked on his 1980 World Tour, starting with a 44-show US leg, his first large-venue tour in four years. Olsson and Murray rejoined John's touring band at this time, which also contained James Newton Howard on keyboards and Zito and Tim Renwick on guitar. Tzuke joined as the opening act, for what would be her first-ever American tour. For much of the tour, 21 at 33 would be represented in setlists by "Little Jeannie", "Sartorial Eloquence", and "White Lady White Powder". Parkinson notes that John's costumes of the time took inspiration from the Village People, with his outfits including a "sequinned cowboy", "musical chauffeur" and, in a publicity photo, a "butch New York cop." Famously, John dressed in a Donald Duck costume for the encore of a free concert in Central Park on 13 September 1980.

Material recorded during the 21 at 33 sessions would appear on John's next album, The Fox (1981). After recording for the album completed, John collaborated with French singer France Gall in what Rosenthal describes as "practically an extension of the 21 at 33 sessions" due to John and Franks producing and the lineup of musicians. These sessions produced two songs, "Les Aveux" and "Donner Pour Donner". The tracks were released as a single in February 1981, which topped the French charts and sold over 600,000 copies. In a 1984 interview, John spoke fondly of 21 at 33, stating: "I think it's one of my best albums. It has a lot of really good songs on it." In the fall of 1980, Brenda Lee released a cover of "Take Me Back" on an album of the same name.

== Track listing ==
Side one
No.	Title	Writer(s)	Length
1.	"Chasing the Crown"	Elton John; Bernie Taupin	5:36
2.	"Little Jeannie"	John; Gary Osborne	5:18
3.	"Sartorial Eloquence"	John; Tom Robinson	4:44
4.	"Two Rooms at the End of the World"	John; Taupin	5:37
Total length:			21:15

Side two
No.	Title	Writer(s)	Length
1.	"White Lady White Powder"	John; Taupin	4:35
2.	"Dear God"	John; Osborne	3:45
3.	"Never Gonna Fall in Love Again"	John; Robinson	4:07
4.	"Take Me Back"	John; Osborne	3:52
5.	"Give Me the Love"	John; Judie Tzuke	5:19
Total length:			21:38

== Personnel ==
Adapted from liner notes.

=== Musicians ===
- Elton John – vocals, acoustic piano (1, 3, 5, 6), overdubbed piano (1, 3, 5, 6, 8), Yamaha electric piano (4), Wurlitzer electric piano (8)
- James Newton Howard – Fender Rhodes (2, 6, 7), Yamaha CS-80 (2), electronic keyboards (3, 7), acoustic piano (9)
- David Paich – organ (6)
- Steve Lukather – electric guitar (1, 3, 4, 6, 7, 9)
- Richie Zito – acoustic guitar (2, 7), electric guitar (5, 8)
- Steve Wrather – electric guitar (7)
- Reggie McBride – bass (1–4, 6–9)
- Dee Murray – bass (5)
- Alvin Taylor – drums (1, 3, 4, 6–9)
- Nigel Olsson – drums (2, 5)
- Victor Feldman – tambourine (1, 3, 5, 9)
- Clive Franks – tambourine (4, 6), cowbell (4)
- Lenny Castro – congas (5, 9)
- Jim Horn – brass arrangements (2, 4), piccolo flute (2), alto saxophone (2), tenor saxophone (4)
- Richie Cannata – alto saxophone (7)
- Larry Williams – tenor saxophone (9)
- Chuck Findley – trombone (2, 4), trumpet (2, 4)
- Bill Reichenbach Jr. – trombone (9)
- Jerry Hey – flugelhorn (2, 9), trumpet (4, 9), brass arrangements (9)
- Larry Hall – trumpet (9), flugelhorn (9)
- Byron Berline – fiddle (8)
- David Foster – string arrangements (9)

Background vocalists

- Venette Gloud – backing vocals (1, 3, 6, 9)
- Stephanie Spruill – backing vocals (1, 3, 6, 9)
- Carmen Twillie – backing vocals (1, 3, 6, 9)
- Bill Champlin – backing vocals (2, 9)
- Max Gronenthal – backing vocals (2)
- Elton John – backing vocals (2, 4, 7, 8)
- Dee Murray – backing vocals (2)
- Glenn Frey – backing vocals (5)
- Don Henley – backing vocals (5)
- Timothy B. Schmit – backing vocals (5)

Choir on "Dear God"

- Curt Becher
- Joe Chemay
- Bruce Johnston (also choir arrangements)
- Jon Joyce
- Peter Noone
- Toni Tennille

=== Production ===
- Elton John – producer
- Clive Franks – producer, engineer, overdub recording
- Patrick Jauneaud – engineer (1–4, 6–9)
- Steve Desper – choir engineer (6)
- David Burgess – second engineer (1–4, 6–9)
- David Leonard – overdub assistant, second engineer (5)
- Peggy McCreary – overdub assistant, second engineer (5)
- Stephen McManus – overdub assistant, second engineer (5)
- Bernie Grundman – mastering at A&M Mastering Studio (Hollywood, California)
- Adrian Collee – studio coordinator
- George Osaki – art direction
- Norman Moore – art direction, cover concept, design
- Jim Shea – photography
- John Reid Management, LTD. – management

== Charts and certifications ==
=== Charts ===
==== Weekly charts ====
Weekly chart performance for 21 at 33
Chart (1980)	Peak position
Australian Albums (Kent Music Report)	7
Canada Top Albums/CDs (RPM)	10
Dutch Albums (Album Top 100)	41
German Albums (Offizielle Top 100)	21
Italian Albums (Musica e Dischi)	25
Japanese Albums (Oricon)	56
New Zealand Albums (RMNZ)	3
Norwegian Albums (VG-lista)	6
Swedish Albums (Sverigetopplistan)	16
UK Albums (Official Charts)	12
US Billboard 200	13

==== Year-end charts ====
Year-end chart performance for 21 at 33
Chart (1980)	Position
Australian Albums (Kent Music Report)	25
Canada Top Albums/CDs (RPM)	42
German Albums (Offizielle Top 100)	65
New Zealand Albums (RMNZ)	23

=== Certifications ===
Certifications for 21 at 33
Region	Certification	Certified units/sales
Australia (ARIA)	Platinum	50,000^{^}
Canada (Music Canada)	Gold	50,000^{^}
France (SNEP)	Gold	100,000^{*}
New Zealand (RMNZ)	Gold	7,500^{^}
United States (RIAA)	Gold	500,000^{^}
^{*} Sales figures based on certification alone.^{^} Shipments figures based on certification alone.
