= Easier to Walk Away =

1990 single by Elton John

Single by Elton John

from the album The Very Best of Elton John and To Be Continued...
- B-side: "I Swear I Heard the Night Talking"; "Made for Me"
- Released: 26 November 1990
- Length: 4:22
- Label: Rocket
- Songwriters: Elton John, Bernie Taupin
- Producer: Don Was

Elton John singles chronology
"You Gotta Love Someone" (1990)	"Easier to Walk Away" (1990)	"Don't Let the Sun Go Down on Me" (1991)

"Easier to Walk Away" is a song written by the British musician Elton John and lyricist Bernie Taupin, performed by John. It is the second and final single released from the Rocket Record Company 2-CD retrospective The Very Best of Elton John, issued largely in overseas markets excluding the United States, where the more expansive box set To Be Continued... was issued. The song peaked at number 63 in the United Kingdom and entered the top 20 in Austria and France. A music video was made to promote the song composed of some John's videos from 1978 to 1990 and some stock footage from various decades.

== Release ==
"Easier to Walk Away" peaked at No. 63 in the UK, No. 57 in Australia, No. 59 in Canada, No. 51 in Germany and No. 71 in the Netherlands. It had better success in Austria and France, peaking at No. 23 and No. 20, respectively.

== Music video ==
The entire music video was shot in black and white. It shows John in various activities he was involved like attending Watford F.C. games and having fun backstage and various historical events in history.

It is also comprised some Elton John music videos from 1978 to 1990 (from how the video started):

- "Healing Hands" (1989) (some clips repeated)
- "I Don't Wanna Go On with You Like That" (1988)
- "You Gotta Love Someone" (1990) (some clips repeated)
- "Wrap Her Up" (1985) (some clips repeated)
- "Paris" (1986) (some clips repeated)
- "A Word in Spanish" (1988)
- "Sacrifice" (1989)
- "I Guess That's Why They Call It the Blues" (1983)
- "Ego" (1978)

== Personnel ==
- Elton John – vocals and piano
- Randy Jackson – bass guitar
- Kenny Aronoff – drums
- Paul Jackson, Jr. – guitar
- Michael Landau – guitar
- David Lasley, Harry Bowens, Donald Ray Michell, Sweet Pea Atkinson – backing vocals
- James Newton Howard – synthesizers and arrangements
- Michael Mason – Synclavier

== Charts ==
Weekly chart performance for "Easier to Walk Away"
Chart (1990–1991)	Peak position
Australia (ARIA)	57
Austria (Ö3 Austria Top 40)	23
Canada Top Singles (RPM)	59
France (SNEP)	20
Germany (GfK)	51
Netherlands (Single Top 100)	71
UK Singles (Official Charts)	63
Zimbabwe (ZIMA)	11

== Release history ==
Release dates and formats for "Easier to Walk Away"
Region	Date	Format(s)	Label(s)	Ref.
United Kingdom	26 November 1990	7-inch vinyl; 12-inch vinyl; CD; cassette	Rocket	
Australia	28 January 1991	7-inch vinyl; CD; cassette	Rocket	
Japan	25 February 1991	Mini-CD	Rocket	
