= Part-Time Love =

- Vinyl picture sleeve

Single by Elton John

from the album A Single Man
- B-side: "I Cry at Night"
- Released: 13 October 1978
- Recorded: January–September 1978
- Genre: Pop rock, disco
- Length: 3:16
- Label: MCA (U.S.); Rocket (UK)
- Songwriters: Elton John, Gary Osborne
- Producers: Elton John, Clive Franks

Elton John singles chronology
| "Ego" (1978) | "Part-Time Love" (1978) | "Song for Guy" (1978) |

"Part-Time Love" is a song written by British musician Elton John with lyrics by Gary Osborne. It is the sixth track off his 1978 album A Single Man. It is also the opening track of side two. It proved to be one of the most popular singles the pair wrote, along with 1982's "Blue Eyes" and the 1980 US million-seller "Little Jeannie". It was banned in the Soviet release of the album along with another song, "Big Dipper". The single reached No. 15 in the UK and peaked just outside the Top 20 in the US at No. 22.

== Release ==
While the lyrics on the A-side were written by Gary Osborne, those on the B-side, "I Cry at Night", were written by Bernie Taupin. It is one of the few singles John released with different lyricists on each side.

The song appeared on his compilation The Very Best of Elton John in 1990 and the deluxe edition of his 2017 compilation Diamonds.

== Reception ==
Cash Box praised the "Fine singing, rhythm textures, big chorus, perky beat and nice arrangement." Record World called it a "solid pop/rock offering with a bouncy beat and full vocal hook."

However, a September 1979 edition of the Ann Landers advice column featured a reader criticizing the song for promoting "[a]cceptance of marital infidelity".

== Chart performance ==
=== Weekly charts ===
| Chart (1978–79) | Peak position |
|---|---|
| Australia (Kent Music Report) | 12 |
| Canadian RPM Top Singles | 13 |
| Canada Adult Contemporary (RPM) | 7 |
| Ireland (IRMA) | 11 |
| Italy | 12 |
| New Zealand | 14 |
| South Africa (Springbok) | 6 |
| UK Singles (OCC) | 15 |
| U.S. Billboard Hot 100 | 22 |
| U.S. Billboard Easy Listening | 40 |
| U.S. Cash Box Top 100 | 13 |

=== Year-end charts ===
| Chart (1978) | Rank |
|---|---|
| Canada | 141 |
| U.S. (Joel Whitburn's Pop Annual) | 146 |
| Chart (1979) | Rank |
| Australia (Kent Music Report) | 88 |

== Personnel ==
- Elton John - piano, vocals
- Tim Renwick - guitars
- Clive Franks - bass
- Steve Holley - drums
- Ray Cooper - percussion
- Vicki Brown - backing vocals
- Joanne Stone – backing vocals
- Stevie Lange – backing vocals
- Gary Osborne – backing vocals
- Chris Thompson – backing vocals
- Davey Johnstone – backing vocals, lead guitar
- Paul Buckmaster – orchestral arrangement
