= Jamaica Jerk-Off =

- Danish single sleeve

Single by Elton John

from the album Goodbye Yellow Brick Road
- A-side: "Candle in the Wind" (Brazil)
- B-side: "Candle in the Wind" (Denmark)
- Recorded: May 1973
- Studio: Château d'Hérouville
- Genre: Pop reggae
- Length: 3:38
- Label: MCA; DJM
- Composer: Elton John
- Lyricist: Bernie Taupin
- Producer: Gus Dudgeon

"Jamaica Jerk-Off" is a song written by Elton John and Bernie Taupin under the aliases Reggae Dwight and Toots Taupin. Released as a single in Denmark and as the B-side of "Candle in the Wind" in Brazil, the pop-reggae track was recorded at Château d'Hérouville in May 1973 for John's album Goodbye Yellow Brick Road. It features John singing in an attempted Caribbean accent and lyrics that depict Jamaica as pleasant. Several reviewers retrospectively ranked John's version on 'worst of' lists, by which time versions of the song had been recorded by The Pioneers and Judge Dread.

== History ==
Born Reg Dwight, John released his first album in 1969 and recorded two at Château d'Hérouville, though this was unavailable when he tried to record a third there. He elected to record his seventh album Goodbye Yellow Brick Road at Jamaica's Dynamic Sounds in response to The Rolling Stones recording Goats Head Soup there, but found the studio facilities and the attitude of the locals lacking. At the time, Jamaica was recovering from an economic slump which had brought about a general sense of misery to the country. While in Jamaica, 21 songs were written, most of which formed the entirety of Goodbye Yellow Brick Road. John eventually returned to Château d'Hérouville to record the album with bassist Dee Murray, drummer Nigel Olsson, and guitarist Davey Johnstone.

"Jamaica Jerk-Off" was recorded in May 1973 and was written by John and Taupin under the aliases Reggae Dwight and Toots Taupin; the latter was a reference to Jamaican musician Toots Hibbert. The pair briefly considered bowdlerising the title as "Jamaica Twist". Taupin stated in 2014 that he did not remember writing it. A pop-reggae track clocking in at 3:38, John sings in an attempted Caribbean accent with lyrics that paint a picture of Jamaica as a place where its inhabitants are happy and play guitar "all day". The track also featured a drum machine and vocal interjections from Gus Dudgeon during its organ solo, for which he was credited as Prince Rhino due to his love of rhinoceroses. The song was released as a single in Denmark, where it was backed by "Candle in the Wind", and in Brazil, where it backed that track.

"The title is bad enough. It sounds like something you might stumble upon in the darkest, dirtiest corner of the internet; something so sordid it turns you into an advocate for the Online Safety Bill. The song itself is only marginally less horrifying: an irritating reggae pastiche with abysmal lyrics sung uncomfortably by Sir Elton in an attempted Jamaican accent that makes Peter Andre's performance in Jafaican (2025) look Oscar-worthy."

— David Alexander of The Daily Telegraph in 2025

The track received several scathing reviews in 2025, many of which noted that John was yet to play the track live. Reviewing a 2014 reissue of Goodbye Yellow Brick Road, Matthew Slaughter of Drowned in Sound described the track as a "savage misstep", and wrote that it was the only track John's showmanship could not rescue. Sarah Kendall stated in 2022 that the song "needs to go and jump in the ocean". In June, Shana Naomi Krochmal of Vulture attributed the song being a "clunker-slash-revenge diss track" to weed brought back from Jamaica. By October, John had been accused of cultural appropriation, with many considering it patronising and dismissive of Caribbean culture; John Meagher of the Irish Independent described the song as "among the most controversial in John's entire back catalogue". In an interview with Rolling Stone, Elton defended the track as being solely "about going to Jamaica and having a good time" and stated that it had "no underlying message whatsoever".

Andy Greene of Rolling Stone wrote that the "deeply unfortunate" track had "no place on the same album as true masterpieces like "Funeral for a Friend/Love Lies Bleeding", "Candle in the Wind", "Sweet Painted Lady", and "Harmony"", while Dale DeBakcsy's Elton John Album by Album described the song as "the part of every Goodbye Yellow Brick Road discussion that everyone dreads" and Goodbye Yellow Brick Road as "a solid sixteen quality songs and also "Jamaica Jerk-Off"". Kevin E G Perry of The Independent suggested that it "would perhaps have been best left [in Jamaica]" and David Alexander of The Daily Telegraph felt that it sat on Goodbye Yellow Brick Road "like an embarrassing holiday photo you can’t bring yourself to throw away".

Versions of the song were released by the Pioneers as part of their 1974 double A-side single "Jamaica Jerk-Off"/"Grandma Grandpa" and by Judge Dread as part of his 1977 Fifth Anniversary EP; the latter entered the UK top 40. Like all his hits, his version was banned by radio and TV for their explicit lyrics; Pierre Perone of The Independent described his version of the song as "truly filthy". The track was later rerecorded for his 1980 album Reggae & Ska, and the entirety of The Fifth Anniversary EP later appeared on a reissue of his album Last of the Skinheads.

== Lists ==
Publisher	Listicle	Year	Result	Ref.
Vulture	"All 388 Elton John Songs, Ranked"	2023	329th (Note: Was 319th until April 2025, when the list was edited to incorporated the ten tracks of John's then-new collaborative album with Brandi Carlile, Who Believes in Angels?.)	
The Daily Telegraph	"The Worst Songs of All Time"	2025	Placed	
The Independent	"13 Worst Songs by Brilliant Artists"	2025	12th	
Rolling Stone	"50 Terrible Songs on Great Albums"	2025	4th	
