= You Gotta Love Someone =

1990 single by Elton John

Single by Elton John

from the album Days of Thunder and The Very Best of Elton John
- B-side: "Medicine Man"
- Released: 8 October 1990
- Length: 4:58 (album version); 4:20 (single version)
- Label: Rocket
- Songwriters: Elton John; Bernie Taupin
- Producers: Don Was; Elton John, James Newton Howard (on "Medicine Man")

Elton John singles chronology
"Club at the End of the Street" (1990)	"You Gotta Love Someone" (1990)	"Easier to Walk Away" (1990)

"You Gotta Love Someone" is a song by British musician Elton John and lyricist Bernie Taupin, performed by John. It was released as a single from the Days of Thunder soundtrack in October 1990. The single was also used to promote the Rocket Records 2-CD retrospective The Very Best of Elton John, issued largely in overseas markets excluding the United States, where the more expansive box set To Be Continued... was issued.

Produced by Don Was, "You Gotta Love Someone" and the three other tracks that close disc 4 of To Be Continued... (along with "Made for Me", "Easier to Walk Away" and "I Swear I Heard the Night Talking", the latter of which was released first as a B-side of the single in France), were all recorded in one take each (minus overdubs). The tracks were also purported to be selections for a possible studio album project that was later abandoned.

== Chart performance ==
The single peaked at number 43 on the Billboard Hot 100 and spent five weeks at number one on the Adult Contemporary chart, his tenth such achievement there. In Canada, the song topped the RPM Top Singles chart for a week, becoming John's fourteenth number-one single in Canada.

== Music video ==
The official music video for the song was directed by Andy Morahan. It is very similar overall to his 1993 video for Billy Joel's hit "The River of Dreams", with several elements from the earlier video (such as lighting, sets, locations, camera angles, tinting etc.) being re-used with very slight variations in the later one.

== Track listings ==
CD single and 12-inch single

1. "You Gotta Love Someone"
2. "Medicine Man"
3. "Medicine Man" (Elton John with Adamski)

7-inch double A-side

- A. "You Gotta Love Someone"
- AA. "Sacrifice"

7-inch single

- A. "You Gotta Love Someone"
- B. "Medicine Man"

7-inch single (France)

- A. "You Gotta Love Someone"
- B. "I Swear I Heard the Night Talking"

== Charts ==
=== Weekly charts ===
Chart (1990–1991)	Peak position
Australia (ARIA)	32
Austria (Ö3 Austria Top 40)	12
Belgium (Ultratop 50 Flanders)	29
Canada Top Singles (RPM)	1
Canada Adult Contemporary (RPM)	1
Europe (Eurochart Hot 100)	73
France (SNEP)	20
Germany (GfK)	43
Ireland (IRMA)	16
Netherlands (Dutch Top 40)	28
Netherlands (Single Top 100)	26
New Zealand (Recorded Music NZ)	27
UK Singles (Official Charts)	33
US Billboard Hot 100	43
US Adult Contemporary (Billboard)	1
US Cash Box Top 100	37
Zimbabwe (ZIMA)	3

=== Year-end charts ===
Chart (1990)	Position
Canada Top Singles (RPM)	99
Canada Adult Contemporary (RPM)	100

Chart (1991)	Position
Brazil (Crowley)	69
Canada Top Singles (RPM)	36
Canada Adult Contemporary (RPM)	41
US Adult Contemporary (Billboard)	19

== Release history ==
Region	Date	Format(s)	Label(s)	Ref.
United Kingdom	8 October 1990	7-inch vinyl; 12-inch vinyl; CD; cassette	Rocket	
United Kingdom	15 October 1990	7-inch gatefold vinyl	Rocket	
Japan	25 October 1990	Mini-CD	Rocket	
Australia	29 October 1990	7-inch vinyl; 12-inch vinyl; CD; cassette	Rocket	
