= The Thom Bell Sessions =

1979 extended play by Elton John

EP by Elton John
- Released: June 1979
- Recorded: Autumn 1977
- Studio: Kaye-Smith (Seattle, Washington); Sigma Sound (Philadelphia, Pennsylvania)
- Genre: Philadelphia soul; disco; R&B; pop
- Length: 18:05
- Label: MCA (US); Rocket (UK)
- Producer: Thom Bell

Elton John chronology
A Single Man (1978)	The Thom Bell Sessions (1979)	Victim of Love (1979)

Singles from The Thom Bell Sessions
- 1. "Are You Ready for Love" Released: May 1979 (UK); 2. "Mama Can't Buy You Love" Released: May 1979 (US)

The Thom Bell Sessions (internationally titled as The Thom Bell Sessions '77) is an EP recorded by Elton John in the second half of 1977 but not released by MCA Records until June 1979.

== Background ==
The project was a departure for Elton John, and his band was not used for these sessions. Until that time, he had worked almost exclusively with lyricist Bernie Taupin and record producer Gus Dudgeon. This project brought Elton John together with R&B songwriter and producer Thom Bell, who had previously worked with such artists as the Stylistics, the Delfonics and the Spinners.

Apparently, relations between the producer and the artist became difficult rather quickly. Although John was eager to work with one of the creators of the Philadelphia soul sound, recording sessions did not go smoothly and ended before an entire album could be finished. During these sessions, Thom Bell also advised Elton John on vocal skills, including encouraging him to sing in a lower register.

Bell had recently relocated from Philadelphia to Seattle, so the initial sessions were recorded at Kaye-Smith Studios, then the top Seattle studio. Additional overdubs were done back at Sigma Sound Studios in Philadelphia. Bell produced all the tracks and co-wrote one of the songs with his nephew, LeRoy Bell, and Casey James, who together comprised the popular singing duo Bell & James. Bell and James co-wrote the other songs in this set. The Spinners sang backing vocals on the project.

Although at least six songs were recorded during the 1977 sessions only three completed tracks were made available on a 12-inch EP in 1979. The project ended up producing one top 10 single: "Mama Can't Buy You Love", which peaked at #9 (#1 Adult Contemporary) on the Billboard Hot 100 in August 1979.

== Track listing ==
Side one

1. "Three Way Love Affair" (LeRoy Bell, Casey James) – 5:31
2. "Mama Can't Buy You Love" (L. Bell, James) – 4:03

Side two

1. "Are You Ready for Love" (L. Bell, Thom Bell, James) – 8:16

== The Complete Thom Bell Sessions ==
The Complete Thom Bell Sessions

Compilation album by Elton John
- Released: February 1989
- Recorded: 1977
- Genre: Philadelphia soul; disco; R&B; pop
- Length: 34:57
- Label: MCA
- Producer: Thom Bell

Elton John chronology
Reg Strikes Back (1988)	The Complete Thom Bell Sessions (1989)	Sleeping with the Past (1989)

Professional ratings
Review scores
Source	Rating
The Encyclopedia of Popular Music	3/5 stars

The Complete Thom Bell Sessions brings together the complete recording session by Elton John and producer Thom Bell onto one album. Released in 1989 by MCA Records, the album is composed of the material previously released in 1979 as well as the songs that were recorded at the original session but had then gone unreleased. Two of the "new" songs were co-written by John – "Nice and Slow" was co-written with Thom Bell and longtime writing partner Bernie Taupin, and "Shine on Through" with lyricist Gary Osborne. Because the recordings were shelved at the time, the latter was re-recorded and included on John's 1978 LP, A Single Man.

Though not noted on the CD, the mixes of "Are You Ready for Love", "Mama Can't Buy You Love" and "Three Way Love Affair" are not the John and Clive Frank remixes from 1979, but the original 1977 Thom Bell mixes. "Are You Ready for Love", for example, now includes Bobby Smith and John Edwards of the Spinners singing the second verse instead of John, among other more subtle differences. The original EP remixes of the songs would later re-surface on the 'CD2' edition of Elton's 1992 single for "The Last Song"; an edited version of the remix of "Are You Ready for Love" would be re-released as a single in 2003, and went on to hit number one on the UK and US Dance charts.

"Nice and Slow" was later released as the B-side to the 7-inch vinyl edition of John's 2004 UK single, "All That I'm Allowed (I'm Thankful)".

=== Track listing ===
1. "Nice and Slow" (Elton John, Bernie Taupin, Thom Bell) – 4:43
2. "Country Love Song" (Joseph Jefferson) – 5:05
3. "Shine on Through" (John, Gary Osborne) – 7:46
4. "Mama Can't Buy You Love" (LeRoy Bell, James) – 4:09
5. "Are You Ready for Love" (L. Bell, T. Bell, James) – 8:16
6. "Three Way Love Affair" (L. Bell, James) – 5:00
