= Dear God (Elton John song) =

- Sleeve art for the 2 × 7" release

Single by Elton John

from the album 21 at 33
- B-side: "Tactics"; "Steal Away Child"; "Love So Cold"
- Written: August 1979
- Released: 14 November 1980
- Recorded: August 1979
- Genre: Christian rock
- Length: 3:45
- Label: Rocket
- Songwriters: Elton John, Gary Osborne
- Producers: Elton John, Clive Franks

Elton John singles chronology
"Harmony" (1980)	"Dear God" (1980)	"Les aveux" (1981)

"Dear God" is a song by British musician Elton John with lyrics by Gary Osborne. It's the sixth track on his 1980 album 21 at 33. It is the shortest track on the album, and when released as a single, it failed to break any major charts, but reached No. 82 on the Australian singles chart.

It was originally intended to be released with only the one B-side, "Tactics", but the actual release came as a double-disc set, with the other disc being "Steal Away Child" and "Love So Cold". Two tracks were later used as B-sides for the Too Low for Zero and Breaking Hearts albums, and did not surface on a CD until the release of the 2020 box set Jewel Box where all three B-side tracks were included.

== Charts ==
Chart (1980)	Peak position
Australia (Kent Music Report)	82

== Personnel ==
- Elton John – lead vocals, backing vocals, acoustic piano, overdubbed piano
- James Newton Howard – Fender Rhodes
- David Paich – organ
- Steve Lukather – electric guitars
- Reggie McBride – bass
- Alvin Taylor – drums
- Clive Franks – tambourine
- Venette Gloud – backing vocals
- Stephanie Spruill – backing vocals
- Carmen Twillie – backing vocals

Choir

- Curt Becher
- Joe Chemay
- Bruce Johnston (also arrangements)
- Jon Joyce
- Peter Noone
- Toni Tennille
