= Are You Ready for Love =

1979 single by Elton John

Single by Elton John

from the album The Thom Bell Sessions
- B-side: "Are You Ready for Love Part 2"
- Released: 4 May 1979
- Length: 5:05 (Part 1); 3:26 (Part 2)
- Label: The Rocket Record Company
- Songwriters: Thom Bell, LeRoy Bell, Casey James
- Producer: Thom Bell

Elton John singles chronology
"Return to Paradise" (1979)	"Are You Ready for Love" (1979)	"Mama Can't Buy You Love" (1979)

Music video
- "Are You Ready for Love" (1979 promo video version) on YouTube

"Are You Ready for Love" is a song recorded by British musician Elton John in 1977 and first released in the UK in 1979 as the first single from the EP The Thom Bell Sessions. It was written by LeRoy Bell, Thom Bell and Casey James, and was originally produced in Philadelphia by Thom Bell, who had already produced a series of hits for the Spinners, the Delfonics and the Stylistics. While the song "Mama Can't Buy You Love" from the EP charted in 1979, this song and the other track on the three-track 12-inch vinyl disc, "Three Way Love Affair", were only minor footnotes at the time. The song originally peaked at number 42 on the UK singles chart in 1979.

In 1989, MCA released a six-track CD, The Complete Thom Bell Sessions, which contained a different mix of "Are You Ready for Love" in place of the one that appeared on the original 1979 EP. (The original Thom Bell Sessions EP mix did, however, surface – along with the EP's other two original tracks – as a B-side to a UK CD-single of "The Last Song" in 1992, issued as Rocket/Phonogram EJSCB-30).

== 2003 version ==
"Are You Ready for Love"

Single by Elton John
- B-side: "Three Way Love Affair"
- Released: 25 August 2003
- Label: Southern Fried, Mercury, Ultra
- Songwriters: Thom Bell, LeRoy Bell, Casey James
- Producer: Thom Bell

Elton John singles chronology
"Sorry Seems to Be the Hardest Word" (2002)	"Are You Ready for Love" (2003)	"The Heart of Every Girl" (2003)

Music video
- "Are You Ready for Love" (2003 music video version) on YouTube

In 2003, "Are You Ready for Love" was remixed by Ashley Beedle and released as a 12-inch vinyl single on 25 August 2003. It gave John the sixth No. 1 hit of his career when it topped the UK singles chart in the first week of its 2003 re-release, following his performance of the song in a television advertisement promoting the new 2003–04 football season for Sky Sports. The 2003 single's B-side is "Three Way Love Affair" (from the original EP) and also the full-length 1979 version of "Are You Ready for Love". On some CD versions, the CD also contains a QuickTime version of a video for the song, with recording studio footage from 1977 with John recording his vocals.

Various hit R&B vocalists of the late 1970s, including Bell and James, MFSB and the Spinners with lead singer John Edwards, contributed backing and accompanying lead vocals, most prominent on the Thom Bell Sessions mixes of the song. The music video, produced in a 1970s retro style, was directed by Kate Dawkins.

=== Track listings ===
UK, US, and Australian CD single

1. "Are You Ready for Love" ('79 radio edit)
2. "Are You Ready for Love" (full length 1979 version)
3. "Three Way Love Affair"
4. "Are You Ready for Love" (CD-ROM video)

UK 12-inch single 1

A. "Are You Ready for Love" (full length '79 version)
B. "Are You Ready for Love" (Freeform Reform remix)

UK 12-inch single 2

A. "Are You Ready for Love" ('79 original)
B. "Are You Ready for Love" (Ashley Beedle Love and Protection mono edit)

UK cassette single

1. "Are You Ready for Love" ('79 radio edit)
2. "Are You Ready for Love" (full length 1979 version)
3. "Three Way Love Affair"

European CD single

1. "Are You Ready for Love" ('79 radio edit)
2. "Are You Ready for Love" (full length 1979 version)

US 12-inch single

A1. "Are You Ready for Love" (Linus Loves Strobelight mix)
A2. "Are You Ready for Love" (79 full length)
B1. "Are You Ready for Love" (Mylo's Road Map to Peace remix)
B2. "Are You Ready for Love" (Ashley Beedle Love and Protection mono re-edit)

== Charts ==
=== Weekly charts ===
Chart (1979)	Peak position
Australia (Kent Music Report)	63
Ireland (IRMA)	17
UK Singles (Official Charts)	42

Chart (2003–2004)	Peak position
Australian Club Chart (ARIA)	4
Austria (Ö3 Austria Top 40)	49
Belgium (Ultratip Bubbling Under Flanders)	4
Belgium (Ultratip Bubbling Under Wallonia)	10
Denmark (Tracklisten)	13
Europe (Eurochart Hot 100)	6
France (SNEP)	60
Germany (GfK)	75
Ireland (IRMA)	4
Ireland Dance (IRMA)	1
Scotland Singles (Official Charts)	1
Switzerland (Schweizer Hitparade)	78
UK Singles (Official Charts)	1
UK Dance (Official Charts)	3
UK Indie (Official Charts)	1
US Dance Club Songs (Billboard)	1

=== Year-end charts ===
Chart (2003)	Position
Australian Club Chart (ARIA)	29
Ireland (IRMA)	51
UK Singles (OCC)	27

Chart (2004)	Position
US Dance Club Play (Billboard)	22

== Certifications ==
Region	Certification	Certified units/sales
New Zealand (RMNZ)	Gold	15,000^{‡}
United Kingdom (BPI)	Platinum	600,000^{‡}
^{‡} Sales+streaming figures based on certification alone.

== Cover versions ==
In 1977, the Spinners recorded two versions of the track. One featured all of the Spinners (and was reissued in 2003), while the other only featured lead singer John Edwards on vocals and was included on their 1979 album From Here to Eternally.

== In popular culture ==
"Are You Ready for Love" was featured on the European version of Donkey Konga 2.

== See also ==
- List of number-one dance singles of 2004 (U.S.)
