= Mama Can't Buy You Love =

Single by Elton John

from the album The Thom Bell Sessions
- B-side: "Three Way Love Affair"
- Released: May 1979
- Recorded: October 1977
- Genre: Philadelphia soul: Disco
- Length: 4:02
- Label: MCA
- Songwriters: LeRoy Bell and Casey James (of Bell and James)
- Producer: Thom Bell

Elton John singles chronology
"Are You Ready for Love" (1979)	"Mama Can't Buy You Love" (1979)	"Victim of Love" (1979)

"Mama Can't Buy You Love" is a hit single for British musician Elton John from the EP The Thom Bell Sessions. The song was written by LeRoy Bell and Casey James (of Bell and James fame). Debuting at number 69 on the Hot 100 on 9 June 1979, the track became John's first US top ten hit in almost three years when it peaked at number nine on 25 August 1979. "Mama Can't Buy You Love" also spent one week at number one on the Adult Contemporary chart. In the US, it was certified gold on 17 August 1979 by the RIAA.

The chord structure of the opening instrumental of "Mama Can't Buy You Love" bears a strong resemblance to the chord structure of the opening instrumental of Ronnie Dyson's "One Man Band (Plays All Alone)". According to the Hot 100, Thom Bell produced both records. The Spinners provided the background vocals on the track.

== Reception ==
Record World said that John's "vocals are a perfect mate for Bell's sparkling lyrics, production & keyboards."

== Chart performance ==
=== Weekly charts ===
Chart (1979)	Peak position
Australia	82
Canada (CRIA)	10
Canadian RPM Top Singles	10
Canadian RPM Adult Contemporary	19
New Zealand	20
US Billboard Hot 100	9
US Billboard Hot Adult Contemporary Tracks	1
US Billboard Hot Soul Singles	36
US Cash Box Top 100	10

=== Year-end charts ===
Chart (1979)	Position
Canada	63
US Billboard Hot 100	36
US Cash Box	56

== Certifications ==
Region	Certification	Certified units/sales
United States (RIAA)	Gold	1,000,000^{^}
^{^} Shipments figures based on certification alone.

== See also ==
- List of number-one adult contemporary singles of 1979 (U.S.)
