= Sartorial Eloquence (Don't Ya Wanna Play This Game No More?) =

Single by Elton John

from the album 21 at 33
- B-side: "White Man Danger"; "Cartier"
- Written: August 1979
- Released: July 1980
- Recorded: August 1979
- Length: 4:44
- Label: Rocket
- Songwriters: Elton John, Tom Robinson
- Producers: Elton John, Clive Franks

Elton John singles chronology
"Little Jeannie" (1980)	"Sartorial Eloquence" (1980)	"Harmony" (1980)

"Sartorial Eloquence" is a song by British musician Elton John with lyrics written by Tom Robinson. It is the third track of his 1980 studio album, 21 at 33. In the UK, it was issued as "Sartorial Eloquence", and in the US as "Don't Ya Wanna Play This Game No More?". It reached No. 39 on the Billboard Hot 100 and No. 45 Adult Contemporary, falling just short of the Top 40 in the UK (#44), and making lesser showings in Canada (#57) and Australia (#91).

According to Elizabeth Rosenthal in her book, His Songs: The Musical Journey of Elton John, the song evokes the disappointment of a man left behind which grows in volume and despondency.

== Reception ==
Billboard said the song was highlighted with "a melodic hook" and "steady beat". They also said that Tom Robinson's lyrics on this song should get attention. Record World called it a "vintage John ballad."

== B-sides ==
Like another of John's songs, "Saturday Night's Alright for Fighting", the single had two b-sides, "White Man Danger" and "Cartier" – a 54-second long commercial-like anthem about expensive jewelry.

"Cartier" later appeared on John's 1990 box set, To Be Continued, in addition to the 2020 box set Jewel Box, which also contained "White Man Danger".

== Charts ==
Chart (1980)	Peak position
Australia (Kent Music Report)	91
Canada Top Singles (RPM)	57
Luxembourg (Radio Luxembourg)	22
UK Singles (Official Charts)	44
US Billboard Hot 100	39
US Adult Contemporary (Billboard)	45
