= Harmony (Elton John song) =

- 1980 UK single cover

Single by Elton John

from the album Goodbye Yellow Brick Road
- A-side: "Bennie and the Jets" (US)
- B-side: "Mona Lisas and Mad Hatters" (UK)
- Released: 4 February 1974 (US); 1980 (UK)
- Recorded: May 1973
- Studio: Château d'Hérouville, France
- Genre: Soft rock
- Length: 2:46
- Label: MCA (US); DJM (UK)
- Songwriters: Elton John; Bernie Taupin
- Producer: Gus Dudgeon

Elton John singles chronology
| "Sartorial Eloquence" (1980) | "Harmony" (1980) | "Dear God" (1980) |

"Harmony" is a song written by British musician Elton John and lyricist Bernie Taupin, and performed by John. It is the final song on the 1973 double album Goodbye Yellow Brick Road. The song was recorded in May 1973, at Château d'Hérouville, France.

In the U.S. in 1974 "Harmony" was released as the B-side of the single "Bennie and the Jets", and in 1980 was released as an A-side in Britain, with "Mona Lisas and Mad Hatters" as the B-side. The song has been covered by many artists, including Diana Ross, Zac Brown Band and Jesse Malin.

== Lyrics and music ==
The lyrics of "Harmony" seem to be addressed to a lover who has returned to the singer after a long absence. He wonders whether she returned to him only because he is the only friend she has left, but expresses his love regardless. Although the lyrics are optimistic, writer James Perone points out that aspects of the music, such as a modulation to a minor key, suggest that the singer's happiness may be only temporary. The author of The Elton John Scrapbook, Mary Anne Cassata, interprets the song as a "two-minute forty-five second dirge of despair...that somehow soared with hope enough to make Brian Wilson proud." Elton John biographer Elizabeth J. Rosenthal interprets the song more metaphorically. Rosenthal views the song as being about John's "love affair with music". In this interpretation, John is expressing his devotion to harmony, and the "luscious" harmonies in the song are confirmation of this devotion. The drawing out of the song's last note suggest to Rosenthal that John's relationship with music will last.

Rosenthal also notes a relationship between "Harmony" and John's 1998 song "If the River Can Bend". She compares lyrics from "Harmony":

Harmony and me
We're pretty good company
Looking for an island
In our boat upon the sea,

with lyrics in "If the River Can Bend" that link nautical images about a returning lover to the "harmony" the lover previously created. Rosenthal thus interprets the theme of "If the River Can Bend" as expanding on that in "Harmony" to encompass the musical partnership between John and Taupin.

== Single release ==
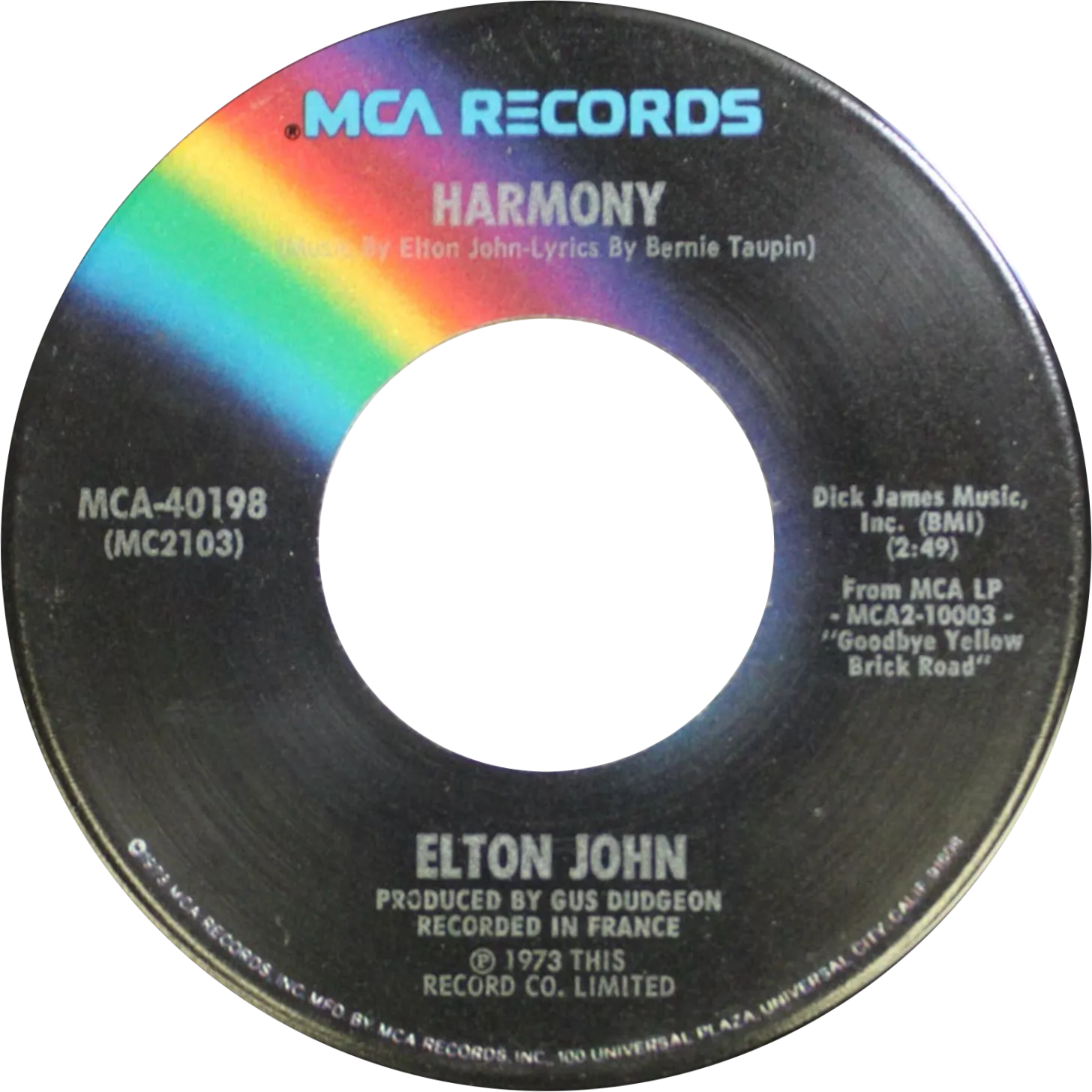
One of side-B labels of the US single

"Harmony" was a candidate to be the fourth single from Goodbye Yellow Brick Road, following the title song, "Saturday Night's Alright for Fighting" and "Bennie and the Jets." However, a fourth single would have been released too close to John's next album Caribou, so instead it was released as the B-side of "Bennie and the Jets" in the U.S. John believes that it would have been a hit had it been released, and Rolling Stone critic Andy Greene concurs.

DJM Records eventually released the song as a single in the UK in 1980, backed with "Mona Lisas and Mad Hatters", to support the compilation album The Very Best of Elton John. The single did not chart.

"Harmony" was popular on American FM playlists of the day, especially WBZ-FM in Boston, whose top 40 chart allowed for the inclusion of LP cuts and B-sides as voted for by listeners. "Harmony" spent three weeks at no. 1 on WBZ-FM's chart in June 1974 and ranked no. 6 for the year, with "Bennie and the Jets" at no. 1 and "Don't Let the Sun Go Down on Me" behind "Harmony" at no. 7.

== Reception ==
Despite its belated and limited single release, "Harmony" has been a fan favourite. It made several radio stations' Top 40s, and ranked as the No. 1 song for three weeks by WBZ-FM in Boston. It was also rated the No. 6 song of 1974 by WBZ.

Cassata rates "Harmony" as one of "the best John-Taupin" compositions, describing it as "brief but ethereal." Rosenthal praises John's piano playing, Nigel Olsson's drumming and Del Newman's orchestral arrangement. Ultimate Classic Rock critic Matthew Wilkenning described "Harmony" as a "gorgeous ballad". Classic Album Sunday's founder Colleen Murphy regards "Harmony" as a personal favourite, describing it as "poignant".

John has often performed "Harmony" live in concert. In 2000, John released a live solo piano version on Elton John – Live At Madison Square Garden, a fan club only CD, which was recorded during one of his two performances at the venue on October 15 & 16, 1999.

== Cover versions ==
Diana Ross released her version of "Harmony" on the 2012 expanded edition of her 1976 album Diana Ross. Jesse Malin covered the song on his 2008 album On Your Sleeve. Allmusic critic described this version as "a barfly with a smile's nocturnal take" on the song. The Zac Brown Band covered the song on the 40th-anniversary deluxe edition of Goodbye Yellow Brick Road.
