= Andre Miripolsky =

American painter

- Born: 1951 (age 74–75); Paris, France
- Education: California Institute of the Arts
- Known for: Painting, drawing, sculpture, murals, brand images, product design
- Notable work: Advertising illustrations for Absolut vodka, Elton John's piano jacket, Bette Midler album cover, Mattel's "Art Barbie."
- Movement: Pop art

Andre Miripolsky (born 1951) is an American pop artist based in Los Angeles, California. His career began with the design of Elton John's piano jacket in 1980, and is best known for his "Fear No Art" button, album covers, the Miripolsky Barbie, and Absolut Vodka illustrations. He also painted the backdrops for the Tonight Show hosted by Jay Leno.

== Early life ==
Miripolsky was born in Paris, France in 1951. His father was Bert Miripolsky, also an artist and the cultural advisor for the American Foreign Service. He attended the California Institute of the Arts where he honed his style. However, he left the institution after two years and briefly pursued an acting career before dedicating himself to visual art full-time.

== Career ==
After his acting stint, Miripolsky became a full-time artist through the creative work he did for Elton John, most notably the "piano jacket" which the musician wore at his 1980 Central Park Concert. This ultimately led to working with other musicians including Cheap Trick, Bette Midler, Quincy Jones, Rolling Stones and Tatsuro Yamashita. He created brand imagery for Bud Light, Mattel, Spago, Superior grocers, and other global markets.

=== "Fear No Art" series ===
Miripolsky got his inspiration for the "Fear No Art" series when he was in the hospital recovering from major injuries he incurred in a car accident. He tired at the wheel of his car driving home from the wedding of Wolfgang Puck and Barbara Lazaroff. In the ensuing accident, he broke both legs and hips, and his face was badly disfigured. "I was like Quasimodo... wrapped up like the Invisible Man," Miripolsky told a Hamilton Spectator reporter. While he was confined to bed at the UCLA Medical Center, an anonymous well wisher sent Miripolsky several hand-made cards, encouraging him to take hope and overcome his injuries. Miripolsky grabbed some cardboard which he happened to have on hand and painted a design to reciprocate the gesture. Eventually, he painted fifty of these cards which were autobiographical and chronicled his injury and recovery. Bert Miripolsky, the artist's father, encouraged him to publish the series which became a book titled Fear No Art: A Crash Course in Reality.

The "Fear No Art" series reverberated through the art world. The phrase was picked up by defenders of controversial artist Robert Mapplethorpe. United States President Bill Clinton cited the phrase as characterizing culture during the Clinton era. Both Clinton and Aerosmith's Steven Tyler wore the "Fear No Art" button as a statement that artistic differences should be respected. According to an article in the Advocate, actor Vincent Price, in his declining years, attached the button to his robe and never took it off. "He died with it on," Miripolsky told the Advocate.

=== Japan commissions ===
In 1988, Miripolsky was approached by a Japanese art patron, Osamu Horiba, who admired his work and invited him to exhibit his work in Japan. The resulting major shows were backed by Horiba at the cost of half a million dollars, according to The New York Times. Miripolsky thinks his work resonates so strongly with the Japanese because of its wildness and freedom. "They want to grasp that, to grab it," he said. Miripolsky departed from his usual pop art theme to design a blood collection bag for a Japanese blood products company, Terumo Medical corporation. He returned to album covers for Tatsuro Yamashita's albums Joy: Tatsuro Yamashita Live (1989) and Artisan (1991). The latter debuted at #1 on the Oricon charts and spent 20 weeks on the charts. Miripolsky later went to design the set for the Japan Gold Disc Awards for four consecutive years.

=== Commercial work ===
In 1991, Absolut Vodka commissioned Miripolsky for his first illustration, which led to several other advertising campaigns organized around Miripolsky's original work. In 1996, the artist was recorded painting on an Absolut webcast which broadcast for a week and was titled the "Human Ant Farm." In 1997, San Francisco's landmark billboard featured a painting titled "Absolut Miripolsky." In 1992, Miripolsky painted a mural on the floor of University of California at Los Angeles' center basketball court at Pauley Pavilion on behalf of the 1992-1993 season of the MTV show, Rock and Jock B-Ball Jam.

From 1997 to 2004, Miripolsky illustrated the sets of NBC's The Tonight Show with Jay Leno. These works were huge scenic paintings and floor art that accompanied the guest bands' segments of the show. It was the first and only time in NBC's history that the network commissioned an independent artist to create such large-format work.

In 2011, Miripolsky was asked to create a mural for the fence of the newly reopening Museum of Monterey. The artist was assisted by a team of art students in creating a mural that represents the sky and ocean using four different shades of blue. Through an optical illusion, the mural gives the visual impression that the museum is sitting on undulating waves of water. Miripolsky sketched out the design on the fence first and, using a sort of paint-by-numbers system, the students colored in the mural. Museum President Todd Hood described the mural as "fundamentally important to the museum and to Monterey."

Miripolsky created a fifteen by fifty foot mural on vinyl in conjunction with Downtown Art Walk, a Los Angeles arts organization. The installation, painted on vinyl, is displayed on the wall on Olive Street between Fifth and Sixth, across from the Millennium Biltmore Hotel. It portrays a panorama of Los Angeles' most recognizable landmarks. Nearby, Miripolsky's "Urban Artscape" is a permanent installation at Seventh and Figueroa. Also painted on vinyl, the 8–foot-by-20-foot mural was supported by Arts Brookfield and the DTLA Art Walk. Miripolsky designed the visual art for a Star Line Tours double-decker bus that makes a six-hour citywide tour, covering Hollywood, Beverly Hills and Downtown Los Angeles.

== Activism ==
Miripolsky has advocated and donated his creative talent to a number of social and political causes. He has also been frequently commissioned to create artwork on behalf of various causes.
