= Ego (Elton John song) =

1978 single by Elton John

Single by Elton John
- B-side: Flinstone Boy
- Released: 31 March 1978
- Recorded: January–March 1978
- Genre: Glam rock
- Length: 4:00
- Label: MCA (US); Rocket (UK)
- Songwriters: Elton John, Bernie Taupin
- Producers: Clive Franks; Elton John

Elton John singles chronology
"The Goaldiggers Song" (1977)	"Ego" (1978)	"Part-Time Love" (1978)

"Ego" is a 1978 song by British musician Elton John and lyricist Bernie Taupin. It was released in early 1978 as a standalone single, and did not appear on John's album released in the same year, A Single Man. John played this song live from 1978 up until 1980. The single reached #34 in both the UK and the US.

The song was not available on CD until the 1990 release of To Be Continued box set. Later, in remastered form, it was added to the reissue of A Single Man along with four B-sides from the era.

== Background ==
The song was written during the sessions for his 1976 album Blue Moves but was not included on that release.

It starts with a rollicking piano accompanied by a train whistle, making it sound like there's a train rolling down a track. The song then goes into a steady 4/4 beat, then breaks down and goes to the chorus. Later in the song it transforms into an uptempo waltz and then reverts to 4/4. It features synthesizers, and carnival-esque organs.

== Reception ==
Cash Box said that the "piano licks resemble Keystone Cop silent film score" and praised the vocals and guitar playing. Record World called it "one of [John's] most complex songs," with "ironic lyrics and unusual chord progressions to make a powerful point."

== Music video ==
A music video was made, directed by Michael Lindsay-Hogg, features John Emberton who played Elton John as a small boy in the video acting out a scene from Romeo & Juliet. John Emberton's sister Penny played a member of the audience.

== Charts ==
Chart performance for "Ego"
Chart (1978)	Peak position
Australia (Kent Music Report)	40
Canada Top Singles (RPM)	21
UK Singles (Official Charts)	34
US Billboard Hot 100	34

== Personnel ==
- Elton John – piano, vocals, synthesizers, organ
- Tim Renwick – guitars
- Clive Franks – bass guitar
- Steve Holley – drums
- Ray Cooper – tambourine, vibraphone, train whistle
- Paul Buckmaster – orchestral arrangements
