= A Single Man (album) =

1978 studio album by Elton John

Studio album by Elton John
- Released: 27 October 1978
- Recorded: January – September 1978
- Studios: The Mill (Cookham, Berkshire)
- Genres: Rock, pop, disco
- Length: 48:46
- Labels: MCA (US); Rocket (UK)
- Producers: Clive Franks; Elton John

Elton John chronology
| Greatest Hits Volume II (1977) | A Single Man (1978) | The Thom Bell Sessions (1979) |

Singles from A Single Man
- 1. "Part-Time Love" Released: 13 October 1978; 2. "Song for Guy" Released: 1 December 1978; 3. "Return to Paradise" Released: February 1979 (EU)

A Single Man is the twelfth studio album by the British musician Elton John. Released in 1978, it is the first album for which Gary Osborne replaced Bernie Taupin as main lyricist. It is also the first of two (the second being Victim of Love) John albums that, on the original cut, have no tracks co-written by Taupin.

== Production ==
A Single Man is the first of Elton John's albums to not include work by lyricist Bernie Taupin, and the first since his 1969 debut, Empty Sky, without producer Gus Dudgeon. The returning members of the Elton John Band are percussionist Ray Cooper and guitarist Davey Johnstone; the latter played on only one song on the album. Paul Buckmaster would not appear on another Elton John album until Made in England (1995). Unlike previous compositions in which lyrics came first, John started the album's compositions by writing melodies at a piano. John sings in a lower register than prior recordings. "Song for Guy" was written as a tribute to Guy Burchett, a young messenger employed by John's record label Rocket Records, who was killed in a motorcycle accident.

The staff and players of Watford Football Club, of which John was chairman at the time, provide backing vocals on "Big Dipper" (which notably includes a lyric implying homosexuality) and "Georgia". Also featured on these tracks are the backing vocals of the female staff from Rocket Records, credited as 'The South Audley Street Girls' Choir'.

The photo for the front cover was taken in the Long Walk, which is part of Windsor Great Park in Berkshire. The inside cover shows John in a Jaguar XK140 FHC. John stopped wearing his trademark glasses in public for a period during the late 1970s, which the album photo reflects.

== Release ==
The album was released on 27 October 1978 by MCA Records in the United States and by Rocket in the United Kingdom. Singles from the album were "Part-Time Love", October 1978; "Song for Guy", December 1978; and "Return to Paradise", February 1979. "Song for Guy" was a near-global success, charting high everywhere except the U.S. and Canada, where MCA initially refused to release it, but did so in March 1979.

A Single Man was John's first album to be officially released in the former Soviet Union, where his previous releases had variously been smuggled. It was released following the success of his 1979 A Single Man in Concert shows in Moscow and Leningrad, though it differed in two ways from its release elsewhere. Firstly, the album was re-titled Poyot Elton John (Russian: "Elton John sings"). Secondly, both "Big Dipper" and "Part-Time Love" were removed due to the subject matter of the songs, though John had performed "Part-Time Love" at Soviet shows.

== Reception ==
Professional ratings
Review scores
| Source | Rating |
|---|---|
| AllMusic | 2/5 stars |
| Christgau's Record Guide | C |
| The Encyclopedia of Popular Music | 3/5 stars |
| Rolling Stone | (negative) |

In the U.S., A Single Man was certified gold in October 1978 and platinum in November of the same year by the RIAA. As with many of John's releases of the late 1970s and the 1980s, it received generally mixed reviews from critics.

== Later releases ==
The 1998 reissue has five bonus tracks, the first two being the 1978 flop single "Ego" and its B-side "Flinstone Boy". The next two tracks are the B-sides of "Part-Time Love" and "Song for Guy" ("I Cry at Night" and "Lovesick" respectively), and the last track, "Strangers", originally the B-side of his 1979 disco-album title track, "Victim of Love".

== Promotion and live performances ==
At the time of release, John performed some songs from the album on shows such as Bruce Forsyth's Big Night (performing "Part-Time Love"), Countdown (miming "Georgia" and "Madness"), The Old Grey Whistle Test (performing "Shooting Star" and "Song for Guy"), The Morecambe & Wise Show (performing "Shine on Through"), Parkinson (performing "Song for Guy"), Rockpop (miming "Return to Paradise" and "Part-Time Love") and Top of the Pops (miming "Part-Time Love" and performing "Song for Guy"). He performed two solo sets: one for MCA personnel at the Century Plaza Hotel on 14 October 1978 (performing "Shine on Through", "Return to Paradise" and "Song for Guy") and the other at a RTL studio on 20 October 1978 (performing "Part-Time Love", "Shooting Star" and "Song for Guy"). He also toured in support of the album in 1979.

In subsequent years, only "Song for Guy" from the album is known to have been performed.

== Track listing ==
All tracks are written by Elton John and Gary Osborne, except where noted.

Side one
| No. | Title | Length |
|---|---|---|
| 1. | "Shine on Through" | 3:45 |
| 2. | "Return to Paradise" | 4:15 |
| 3. | "I Don't Care" | 4:23 |
| 4. | "Big Dipper" | 4:04 |
| 5. | "It Ain't Gonna Be Easy" | 8:27 |

Side two
| No. | Title | Length |
|---|---|---|
| 1. | "Part-Time Love" | 3:16 |
| 2. | "Georgia" | 4:50 |
| 3. | "Shooting Star" | 2:44 |
| 4. | "Madness" | 5:53 |
| 5. | "Reverie" (John) | 0:53 |
| 6. | "Song for Guy" (John) | 6:35 |
| Total length: | | 48:46 |

- Sides one and two were combined as tracks 1–11 on CD reissues.

Bonus tracks (1998 Mercury reissue)
| No. | Title | Length |
|---|---|---|
| 12. | "Ego" (John, Bernie Taupin) | 4:00 |
| 13. | "Flinstone Boy" (John) | 4:13 |
| 14. | "I Cry at Night" (John, Taupin) | 3:16 |
| 15. | "Lovesick" (John, Taupin) | 3:59 |
| 16. | "Strangers" | 4:46 |
| Total length: | | 69:00 |

== Personnel ==
Track numbering refers to CD and digital releases of the album.

=== Musicians ===
- Elton John – vocals (1–7, 11), backing vocals (1, 2, 8), pianos (1, 4, 11), acoustic piano (2, 3, 5–7, 9, 10), clavinet (3), harmonium (7), church organ (7), Fender Rhodes (8), all vocals (9), Mellotron (11), Polymoog (11), Solina String Synthesizer (11)
- Tim Renwick – acoustic guitars (2, 3), electric guitars (4–6, 9), Leslie guitar (7), mandolin (7)
- Davey Johnstone – lead guitar (6), backing vocals (6)
- B.J. Cole – pedal steel guitar (7)
- Clive Franks – bass (1–7, 9, 11)
- Herbie Flowers – acoustic bass (8)
- Steve Holley – drums (1–9), motor horn (4)
- Ray Cooper – tambourine (1, 3–7, 9), marimba (2), shaker (2, 8, 11), vibraphone (5), congas (6, 9), timpani (9), wind chimes (11), rhythm box (11)
- John Crocker – clarinet (4), tenor saxophone (8)
- Jim Shepherd – trombone (4)
- Henry Lowther – trumpet (2)
- Patrick Halcox – trumpet (4)
- Paul Buckmaster – orchestra arrangements (1, 3, 5, 6, 9), arrangements (2), ARP synthesizer (10)
- Gary Osborne – backing vocals (1–3, 6)
- Vicki Brown – backing vocals (3, 6)
- Stevie Lange – backing vocals (3, 6)
- Joanne Stone – backing vocals (3, 6)
- Chris Thompson – backing vocals (3, 6)
- The South Audley Street Girl's Choir – backing vocals (4, 7)
- Watford Football Club – backing vocals (4, 7)

=== Production ===
- Elton John – producer
- Clive Franks – producer, engineer, mixing
- Phil Dunne – engineer, mixing
- Stuart Epps – engineer, mixing
- Ian Cooper – mastering at Utopia Studios (London, UK)
- David Croker – album coordinator
- Alex Foster – album coordinator
- David Costa – sleeve design
- Terry O'Neill – photography
- John Reid – management

=== 1998 remastering credits ===
- Mike Gill – supervising producer
- Peter Mew – engineer
- Gus Dudgeon – digital remastering
- Abbey Road Studios (London, UK) – remastering location
- Mike Storey – graphics
- John Tobler – liner notes editing
- Chris White – liner notes

== Charts ==
=== Weekly charts ===
| Chart (1978–1979) | Peak position |
|---|---|
| Australian Albums (Kent Music Report) | 8 |
| Canada Top Albums/CDs (RPM) | 12 |
| Dutch Albums (Album Top 100) | 16 |
| German Albums (Offizielle Top 100) | 16 |
| Italian Albums (Musica e Dischi) | 13 |
| Japanese Albums (Oricon) | 74 |
| New Zealand Albums (RMNZ) | 5 |
| Norwegian Albums (VG-lista) | 4 |
| Spanish Albums (AFYVE) | 12 |
| Swedish Albums (Sverigetopplistan) | 26 |
| UK Albums (Official Charts) | 8 |
| US Billboard 200 | 15 |

=== Monthly charts ===
Monthly chart performance for A Single Man
| Chart (1982) | Peak position |
|---|---|
| Soviet Albums (Moskovskij Komsomolets) | 1 |

=== Year-end charts ===
| Chart (1978) | Position |
|---|---|
| Australian Albums (Kent Music Report) | 82 |
| Canada Top Albums/CDs (RPM) | 93 |
| New Zealand Albums (RMNZ) | 33 |

| Chart (1979) | Position |
|---|---|
| Australian Albums (Kent Music Report) | 28 |
| Italian Albums (Musica e Dischi) | 43 |
| UK Albums (OCC) | 82 |

== Certifications ==
| Region | Certification | Certified units/sales |
|---|---|---|
| Canada (Music Canada) | Platinum | 100,000^{^} |
| France (SNEP) | Gold | 100,000^{*} |
| Netherlands (NVPI) | Gold | 50,000^{^} |
| New Zealand (RMNZ) | Platinum | 15,000^{^} |
| United Kingdom (BPI) | Gold | 100,000^{^} |
| United States (RIAA) | Platinum | 1,000,000^{^} |
^{*} Sales figures based on certification alone.^{^} Shipments figures based on certification alone.
