= Funeral for a Friend/Love Lies Bleeding =

- 12-inch single cover (1978)

Song by Elton John

from the album Goodbye Yellow Brick Road
- Released: 1973
- Recorded: May 1973
- Studio: Château d'Hérouville, France
- Genre: Pop rock; progressive rock; progressive pop
- Length: 11:07
- Label: DJM (UK/world); MCA (US/Canada)
- Songwriters: Elton John; Bernie Taupin
- Producer: Gus Dudgeon

"Funeral for a Friend/Love Lies Bleeding" is a medley of two songs written by English musician Elton John and songwriter Bernie Taupin, and performed by John. It is the opening track of the 1973 double album Goodbye Yellow Brick Road.

The first part, "Funeral for a Friend", is an instrumental created by John while thinking of what kind of music he would like at his funeral. This first half segues into "Love Lies Bleeding".

== Composition and recording ==
In the 2001 Eagle Vision documentary, Classic Albums: Goodbye Yellow Brick Road, John said the two songs were not written as one piece, but fit together since "Funeral for a Friend" ends in the key of A, and "Love Lies Bleeding" opens in A. The two were played as one elongated piece when recorded, with the transition to "Love Lies Bleeding" beginning at the 5-minute and 49-second mark. However, the songs are published and copyrighted individually and remain separate entities with separate sheet music. With lyrics like "And love lies bleeding in my hand/Oh, it kills me to think of you with another man", lyricist Bernie Taupin uses death symbolism as an angry take on a break-up song.

The grandiose introduction to "Funeral for a Friend" and additional synthesizer parts in "Love Lies Bleeding" were performed during final overdubs and mixing at Trident Studios on an ARP 2500 synthesizer (erroneously credited as A.R.P.) by the album's engineer, David Hentschel, who, John recalled, overdubbed track after track of music and synthetic atmospheric effects until the work was complete. In an interview for John's official website, Hentschel recalled that he used melodies from "The Ballad of Danny Bailey (1909–1934)", "I’ve Seen That Movie, Too", "Candle in the Wind" and others in creating the track.

"Funeral for a Friend/Love Lies Bleeding" was one of the first songs recorded for Goodbye Yellow Brick Road. According to John's official website, the basic tracks were recorded on May 7, 1973, the first day of recording, along with "Candle in the Wind" and the basic tracks for "Bennie and the Jets," the three songs would comprise Side 1 of the vinyl album.

== Release and reception ==
The song was well received by critics. AllMusic's Donald Guarisco later called "Funeral for a Friend" "a stunning instrumental" with "a powerful fusion of classical and rock elements where a gentle, lyrical motif is developed and energized until it builds into a powerhouse full of emotion and bombast."

"Funeral for a Friend/Love Lies Bleeding" was too long for a single release, but got significant airplay on FM stations that were predisposed toward rock epics. The whole piece is just over 11 minutes long. A fan favourite, it became a staple part of many Elton John tour set lists.

Billboard magazine listed this song as number two in the list of Elton John's best songs as picked by critics, second only to "Bennie and the Jets". Rolling Stone readers picked this song as number three in a list of "deep cuts" by Elton John, songs that only a true fan would know, even though it has received significant exposure over the years. The song had a strong influence on the Guns N' Roses Use Your Illusion albums and, in particular, the song "November Rain". Avenged Sevenfold's M. Shadows lists the song among the ten songs that helped shape how he relates to music.

== Covers ==
- The song was covered live by the American progressive metal band Dream Theater, and appears on the 1995 EP A Change of Seasons.
- "Love Lies Bleeding" was covered by Très Bien! on The Next Great American Band.
- Joe Elliott’s Down 'n' Outz covered the song on their 2017 live album “The Further Live Adventures Of…”
- "Weird Al" Yankovic covered "Funeral for a Friend" live during the Ridiculously Self-Indulgent, Ill-Advised Vanity Tour of 2018, with Yankovic playing John's piano parts on accordion.
- The song was interpolated in the song "Be Calm" by fun. on their album Aim and Ignite.
- The song was covered live by Metallica on 20 March 2024 when Elton and Bernie were honored with the Gershwin Prize at DAR Constitution Hall.

== References in other media ==
Appears in the documentary soundtrack to James Dean: The First American Teenager.

Jean Grand-Maître choreographed a ballet for the Alberta Ballet called Love Lies Bleeding.

The opening of "Funeral for a Friend" is used in the final episode of Blackadder II.
