= Goodbye Yellow Brick Road =

1973 album by Elton John

Studio album by Elton John
- Released: 5 October 1973
- Recorded: May 1973
- Studios: Château d'Hérouville, Hérouville, France; Trident, London (overdubs, remixes)
- Genres: Pop rock; glam rock
- Length: 76:20
- Label: DJM
- Producer: Gus Dudgeon

Elton John chronology
Don't Shoot Me I'm Only the Piano Player (1973)	Goodbye Yellow Brick Road (1973)	Lady Samantha (1974)

Singles from Goodbye Yellow Brick Road
- 1. "Saturday Night's Alright for Fighting" Released: 29 June 1973; 2. "Goodbye Yellow Brick Road" Released: 7 September 1973; 3. "Bennie and the Jets" Released: 4 February 1974; 4. "Candle in the Wind" Released: 22 February 1974

Goodbye Yellow Brick Road is the seventh studio album by British singer, pianist and composer Elton John. A double album, it was released on 5 October 1973, by DJM Records. Recorded at the Château d'Hérouville in France, the album became a double LP once John and his band became inspired by the locale. Among the 17 tracks, the album contains the hits "Candle in the Wind", US number-one single "Bennie and the Jets", "Goodbye Yellow Brick Road", and "Saturday Night's Alright for Fighting", along with the live favourites "Funeral for a Friend/Love Lies Bleeding" and “Harmony".

The album was a strong commercial success, reaching number one on the Billboard Top LPs & Tape chart, as well as also topping album charts in the UK, Australia, and Canada (five weeks at number one); it has since sold more than 20 million copies worldwide and is widely regarded as John's magnum opus. It was inducted into the Grammy Hall of Fame in 2003, and continues to be highly regarded in various rankings. It was ranked number 112 on Rolling Stone's 2020 list of the "500 Greatest Albums of All Time". In 2025, the album was deemed "culturally, historically, or aesthetically significant" by the Library of Congress and selected for preservation in the National Recording Registry.

== Production ==
Under the working titles of Vodka and Tonics and Silent Movies, Talking Pictures, Bernie Taupin wrote the lyrics in two and a half weeks, with Elton John composing most of the melodies in three days while staying at the Pink Flamingo Hotel in Kingston, Jamaica. John had wanted to go to Jamaica, in part because the Rolling Stones had just recorded Goats Head Soup there.

Production on the album was started in Jamaica in late January 1973, but due to difficulties with the sound system and the studio piano, logistical issues arising from the Joe Frazier–George Foreman boxing match taking place in Kingston, and protests over the political and economic situation in the country, the band decided to move before any productive work was done.

Goodbye Yellow Brick Road was recorded in two weeks during May that year at the Studio d'enregistrement Michel Magne, at the Château d'Hérouville near Pontoise, in France, where John had previously recorded Honky Château and Don't Shoot Me I'm Only the Piano Player. While a version of "Saturday Night's Alright for Fighting" was recorded in Jamaica, that recording was discarded; the released version of the song came from the sessions at the Château. The band plays on all the songs except "This Song Has No Title", on which John performs all the piano, keyboard and vocal parts.

According to the album's producer, Gus Dudgeon, the album was not planned as a two-record collection. John and Taupin composed a total of 22 tracks for the album, of which 18 (counting "Funeral for a Friend" and "Love Lies Bleeding" as two distinct tracks) were used, enough that it was released as a double album, John's first (three more such albums followed up to 2011). Through the medium of cinematic metaphor, the album builds on nostalgia for a childhood and culture left in the past. Tracks include "Bennie and the Jets", "Goodbye Yellow Brick Road", the 11-minute "Funeral for a Friend/Love Lies Bleeding", and the Marilyn Monroe tribute "Candle in the Wind". "Saturday Night's Alright for Fighting" was inspired by memories of a Market Rasen pub that Taupin frequented when younger. "Grey Seal", previously the B-side of the 1970 single "Rock and Roll Madonna", was re-recorded for the album.

"Harmony" the album's final track, was considered as a fourth single, but was not issued at the time because the chart longevity of the album and its singles brought it too close to the upcoming releases of Caribou and its proposed accompanying singles. It was, however, used as the B-side of the American release of the "Bennie and the Jets" single, and was popular on FM playlists of the day, especially WBZ-FM in Boston, whose top 40 chart allowed for the inclusion of LP cuts and B-sides as voted for by listeners. "Harmony" spent three weeks at number one on WBZ-FM's chart in June 1974 and ranked number six for the year, with "Bennie and the Jets" at number one and "Don't Let the Sun Go Down on Me" behind "Harmony" at number seven. "Harmony" was released as a single in Britain in 1980 and failed to chart.

== Release and reception ==
Professional ratings
Review scores
Source	Rating
AllMusic	4.5/5 stars
Christgau's Record Guide	B
The Encyclopedia of Popular Music	4/5 stars
The Daily Vault	A
Rolling Stone	(mixed)
The Rolling Stone Album Guide	5/5 stars
Slant Magazine	4.5/5 stars

The album was released on 5 October 1973 as a double LP, with cover art by illustrator Ian Beck depicting John stepping into a poster. It debuted at number 17 on the Billboard 200 and quickly rose to number one on its fourth week on the chart, where it stayed for eight consecutive weeks. It was the best-selling album in the US in 1974. In the UK it topped the album chart for two weeks. The album was preceded by its lead single, "Saturday Night's Alright for Fighting", which reached number seven on the UK singles chart and number 12 in the US. Its next single, "Goodbye Yellow Brick Road" reached number six in the UK and number two in the US. "Bennie and the Jets" was released as a single in the US, and it topped the Billboard Hot 100 for one week in 1974. Its final single, "Candle in the Wind", released in the UK, reached number 11.

The original 1973 vinyl LP was released on two discs, as well as on cassette, 8-track cartridge and 1/4" reel-to-reel tape. The first 2-CD editions appeared on MCA Records in 1984 and on DJM Records the following year, as early CD mastering limited each disc to 72-74 minutes at the time. The 1992 and 1995 CD remasters allowed the album to fit on one disc, as it was slightly less than 80 minutes. The 30th anniversary edition followed the original format, splitting the album across two discs to allow the inclusion of the bonus tracks, while a DVD on the making of the album was also included. The album has also been released by Mobile Fidelity as a single disc 24-karat gold CD. The album (including all four bonus tracks) was released on SACD (2003), DVD-Audio (2004), and Blu-ray Audio (2014). These high resolution releases included the original stereo mixes, as well as 5.1 remixes produced and engineered by Greg Penny.

Goodbye Yellow Brick Road is widely regarded as one of John's best albums, and is one of his most popular. It is his best-selling studio album.

In the US, it was certified gold on 12 October 1973 (just days after release), 5× platinum in March 1993, and eventually 8× platinum in February 2014 by the RIAA.

=== Legacy ===
The album was inducted into the Grammy Hall of Fame in 2003, and was included in the 2005 book 1001 Albums You Must Hear Before You Die.

In 2003 and 2012, the album was ranked number 91 on Rolling Stone magazine's list of the 500 greatest albums of all time, and re-ranked number 112 in a 2020 revised list. Goodbye Yellow Brick Road ranked number 59 in Channel 4's 2009 list of 100 Greatest Albums.

In 2023, Joe Lynch of Billboard ranked the album cover, depicting the "bedazzled rocker – wearing ruby red platform heels and a bomber jacket with his name on it — step[ping] into a poster of the famed yellow brick road Dorothy and her coterie followed to the Emerald City of Oz," as the 74th best album cover of all time. Lynch dubbed the image career-defining, as it "came out three years before Elton himself did – but if you didn't get that he was a Friend of Dorothy based on this, that's on you."

The liner note illustration for the song "I've Seen That Movie Too", depicting silhouettes in front of a movie screen, inspired the staging of the comedy television series Mystery Science Theater 3000.

American parody artist "Weird Al" Yankovic has said the album was the first that he bought with his own money and was "probably the most impactful" on him, calling it "a masterwork."

== Track listing ==
All music is composed by Elton John; all lyrics are written by Bernie Taupin.

Side one
No.	Title	Length
1.	"Funeral for a Friend/Love Lies Bleeding"	11:09
2.	"Candle in the Wind"	3:50
3.	"Bennie and the Jets"	5:23
Total length:		20:22

Side two
No.	Title	Length
4.	"Goodbye Yellow Brick Road"	3:13
5.	"This Song Has No Title"	2:23
6.	"Grey Seal"	4:00
7.	"Jamaica Jerk-Off"	3:39
8.	"I've Seen That Movie Too"	5:59
Total length:		19:14

Side three
No.	Title	Length
9.	"Sweet Painted Lady"	3:54
10.	"The Ballad of Danny Bailey (1909–34)"	4:23
11.	"Dirty Little Girl"	5:00
12.	"All the Girls Love Alice"	5:09
Total length:		18:26

Side four
No.	Title	Length
13.	"Your Sister Can't Twist (but She Can Rock 'n Roll)"	2:42
14.	"Saturday Night's Alright for Fighting"	4:57
15.	"Roy Rogers"	4:07
16.	"Social Disease"	3:42
17.	"Harmony"	2:46
Total length:		18:14

30th anniversary deluxe edition (2003) bonus tracks
No.	Title	Length
1.	"Whenever You're Ready (We'll Go Steady Again)" (B-side of "Saturday Night's Alright for Fighting")	2:52
2.	"Jack Rabbit" (B-side of "Saturday Night's Alright for Fighting")	1:50
3.	"Screw You (Young Man's Blues)" (B-side of "Goodbye Yellow Brick Road")	4:42
4.	"Candle in the Wind" (2003 acoustic remix by Greg Penny)	3:51
Total length:		89:35

40th anniversary celebration / super deluxe edition (2014) disc two
No.	Title	Length
1.	"Candle in the Wind" (Ed Sheeran)	3:21
2.	"Bennie and the Jets" (Miguel featuring Wale)	5:10
3.	"Goodbye Yellow Brick Road" (Hunter Hayes)	3:09
4.	"Grey Seal" (The Band Perry)	3:38
5.	"Sweet Painted Lady" (John Grant)	3:57
6.	"All the Girls Love Alice" (Emeli Sandé)	3:35
7.	"Your Sister Can't Twist (But She Can Rock 'n Roll)" (Imelda May)	2:50
8.	"Saturday Night's Alright for Fighting" (Fall Out Boy)	3:44
9.	"Harmony" (Zac Brown Band)	2:57

Highlights from Live at Hammersmith Odeon, December 1973
No.	Title	Length
10.	"Candle in the Wind"	4:04
11.	"Goodbye Yellow Brick Road"	3:07
12.	"All the Girls Love Alice"	7:18
13.	"Bennie and the Jets"	6:09
14.	"Rocket Man"	4:55
15.	"Daniel"	4:17
16.	"Honky Cat"	7:16
17.	"Crocodile Rock"	3:56
18.	"Your Song"	4:11
Total length:		77:25

== Personnel ==
According to the album's liner notes. Track numbers refer to CD and digital releases of the album.

- Elton John – vocals, acoustic piano (1–6, 8–10, 12–17), Fender Rhodes (5, 6), Farfisa organ (3, 5, 7, 13), Mellotron (5, 6, 11)
- David Hentschel – ARP synthesizer (1, 12)
- Davey Johnstone – acoustic guitar, electric guitar, Leslie guitar, slide guitar, steel guitar, banjo, backing vocals (1, 2, 4, 10, 13, 17)
- Dee Murray – bass guitar, backing vocals (1, 2, 4, 10, 13, 17)
- Nigel Olsson – drums, congas, tambourine, backing vocals (1, 2, 4, 10, 13, 17), car effects (12)
- Ray Cooper – tambourine (12)
- Del Newman – orchestral arrangements (4, 8–10, 15, 17)
- David Katz – orchestra contractor (4, 8–10, 15, 17)
- Leroy Gómez – saxophone solo (16)
- Kiki Dee – backing vocals (12)
- Uncredited – Vocal interjections on "Jamaica Jerk-Off" (credited to Prince Rhino, Reggae Dwight and Toots Taupin, possibly a pseudonym for Elton John and Bernie Taupin, though this is uncertain), drum machine, maracas, timbales, claves on "Jamaica Jerk-Off", castanets on "Funeral for a Friend", shaker on "I've Seen That Movie Too", tambourine on "Social Disease", accordion, vibraphone on "Sweet Painted Lady"

Production

- Gus Dudgeon – producer, liner notes
- David Hentschel – engineer
- Peter Kelsey – assistant engineer
- Andy Scott – assistant engineer
- Barry Sage – tape operator (not listed in album credits)
- David Larkham – art direction, artwork
- Michael Ross – art direction, artwork
- Ian Beck – artwork
- John Tobler – liner notes
- Greg Penny – producer (2003 SACD reissue); 5.1 surround and Dolby Atmos mixing

== Charts ==
=== Weekly charts ===
Weekly chart performance for Goodbye Yellow Brick Road
Chart (1973–1975)	Peak position
Australian Albums (Kent Music Report)	1
Canada Top Albums/CDs (RPM)	1
Danish Albums (LFPI)	8
Finnish Albums (Suomen virallinen lista)	26
German Albums (Offizielle Top 100)	41
Italian Albums (Musica e Dischi)	5
Japanese Albums (Oricon)	22
New Zealand Albums (RMNZ)	9
Norwegian Albums (VG-lista)	5
Spanish Albums (AFYVE)	8
Swedish Albums (Radio Sweden)	7
UK Albums (Official Charts)	1
US Billboard 200	1

Chart (1994)	Peak position
New Zealand Albums (RMNZ)	36

Chart (2014)	Peak position
German Albums (Offizielle Top 100)	61
Scottish Albums (Official Charts)	13
UK Albums (Official Charts)	12

=== Year-end charts ===
Year-end chart performance for Goodbye Yellow Brick Road
Chart (1974)	Position
Australian Albums (Kent Music Report)	2
Canada Top Albums/CDs (RPM)	37
UK Albums (OCC)	7
US Billboard 200	1

Chart (1975)	Position
New Zealand Albums (RMNZ)	7

Chart (2019)	Position
Australian Albums (ARIA)	71

== Certifications and sales ==
Certifications and sales for Goodbye Yellow Brick Road
Region	Certification	Certified units/sales
Australia (ARIA) original release	10× Platinum	500,000^{^}
Australia (ARIA) re-release	3× Platinum	210,000^{‡}
Canada (Music Canada)	2× Platinum	200,000^{^}
Denmark (IFPI Danmark)	Gold	10,000^{‡}
New Zealand (RMNZ)	Platinum	15,000^{^}
United Kingdom (BPI) 1973 release	Platinum	300,000^{^}
United Kingdom (BPI) 2014 release	2× Platinum	600,000^{‡}
United States (RIAA)	8× Platinum	8,000,000^{^}
^{^} Shipments figures based on certification alone.^{‡} Sales+streaming figures based on certification alone.
