= Don't Let the Sun Go Down on Me =

1974 single by Elton John

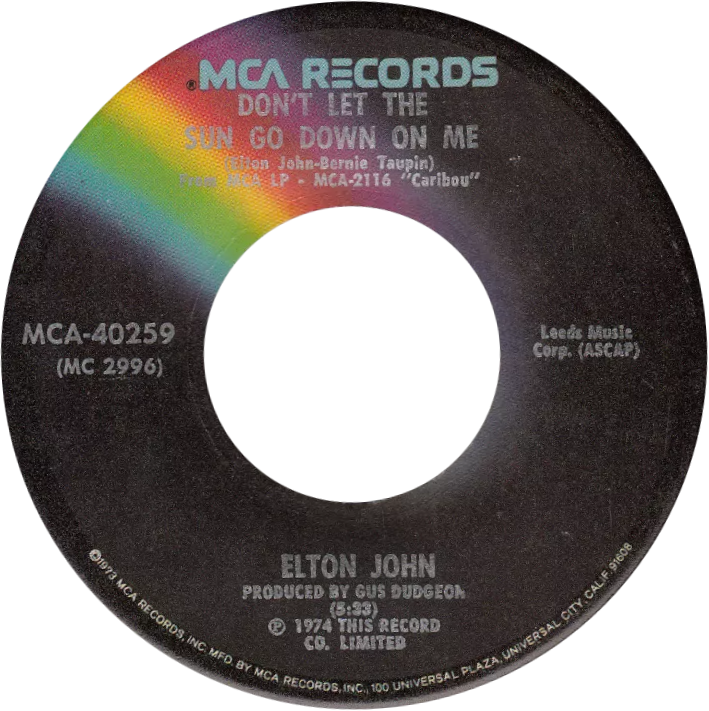
- One of side-A labels of the US single

Single by Elton John

from the album Caribou
- B-side: "Sick City"
- Released: 24 May 1974
- Recorded: January 1974
- Studio: Caribou Ranch
- Genre: Orchestral pop
- Length: 5:35
- Label: MCA; DJM; Rocket; Phonogram
- Songwriters: Elton John; Bernie Taupin
- Producer: Gus Dudgeon

Elton John singles chronology
"Candle in the Wind" (1974)	"Don't Let the Sun Go Down on Me" (1974)	"The Bitch Is Back" (1974)

Official audio
- "Don't Let The Sun Go Down On Me" (Remastered 1995) on YouTube

"Don't Let the Sun Go Down on Me" is a song by British musician Elton John and lyricist Bernie Taupin. It was originally recorded by John for his eighth studio album, Caribou (1974), and was released as a single that peaked at number two on the US Billboard Hot 100 chart, and reached number 16 on the UK Singles Chart.

A version of the song recorded live as a duet between John and George Michael reached number one in the UK in 1991 and in the US in 1992. The pair had performed the song together for the first time at Live Aid at Wembley Stadium in July 1985.

During his headlining appearance at the Glastonbury Festival on 25 June 2023, John dedicated the song to Michael, who died in 2016.

== Elton John version ==
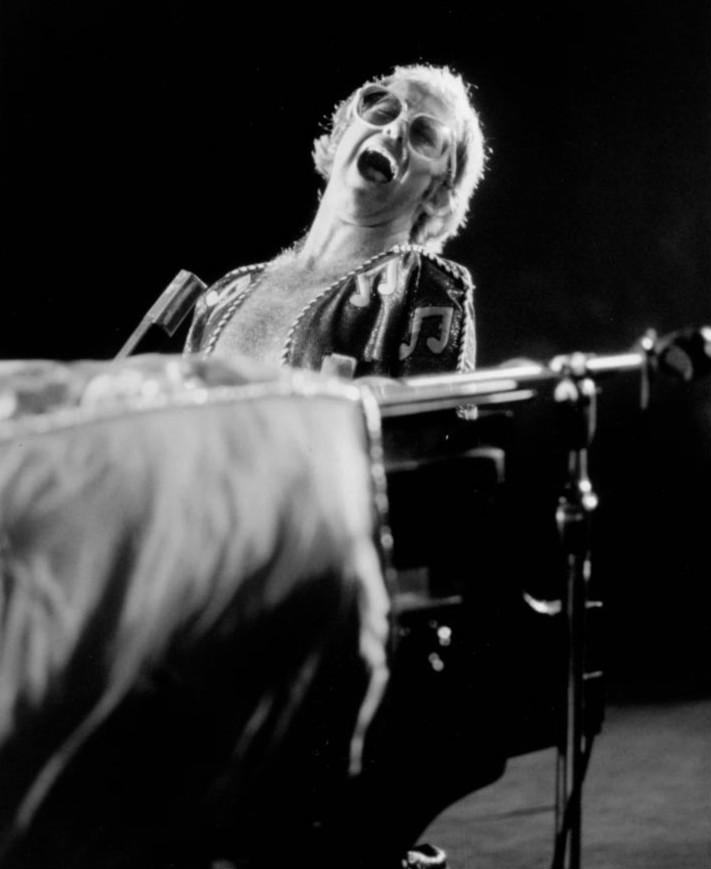
Elton John in 1974

=== Background ===
"Don't Let the Sun Go Down on Me" was co-written by Elton John and Bernie Taupin during a ten-day period in January 1974 along with the other songs for John's Caribou album. The song was released as the first single from the album on 24 May 1974 in the United Kingdom, and on 10 June 1974 in the United States.

The chorus of the song features backing vocals by Carl Wilson and Bruce Johnston of the Beach Boys with Billy Hinsche and Toni Tennille. A horn arrangement by Del Newman augments and reflects Johnston's chorale lines, with trumpets echoing Carl Wilson's high notes. The original backing vocalists were Johnston, Cat Stevens, Danny Hutton, Gerry Beckley, Dusty Springfield, and Brian Wilson but according to Johnston, who handled the vocal arrangements, "everyone was afraid of one another and I couldn't get a performance out of anyone". Also on the song are percussion accents provided by Ray Cooper and a mellotron played by Dave Hentschel. Davey Johnstone's electric guitar stylings provide a counterpoint to the melody, the signal routed through a Leslie speaker, but his acoustic guitar part was not used in the final mix. His electric guitar string harmonics are heard ringing out between vocal lines.

=== Reception ===
Cash Box called it "a gradually building track with pretty lyrics that is as brilliant in performance as it is in production". Record World said that "More poetic than anything he's released since 'Daniel', this expansive ballad begins simply and builds into a bonanza of bright harmonies."

"Don't Let the Sun Go Down on Me" charted on 1 June 1974 in the UK, reaching number 16 on the UK Singles Chart. The song reached the top 10 on the Billboard Hot 100 chart after four weeks, peaking at number two for two weeks from 27 July behind John Denver's "Annie's Song". In the US, the single was certified Gold on 6 September 1974 by the RIAA. In Canada, it reached number one, becoming his fifth chart topper in that country.

=== Accolades ===
==== Grammy Awards ====
Grammy Awards for "Don't Let the Sun Go Down on Me
Year	Nominee / work	Award	Result
1975	"Don't Let the Sun Go Down on Me"	Record of the Year	Nominated
1975	"Don't Let the Sun Go Down on Me"	Best Pop Vocal Performance – Male	Nominated

=== Track listings ===
- May 1974 US and UK 7-inch vinyl single
1. "Don't Let the Sun Go Down on Me"
2. "Sick City"
- February 1991 UK 7-inch vinyl single and cassette
1. "Don't Let the Sun Go Down on Me"
2. "Song for Guy"
- February 1991 UK 12-inch vinyl and CD single
1. "Don't Let the Sun Go Down on Me"
2. "Song for Guy"
3. "Sorry Seems to Be the Hardest Word"

=== Personnel ===
- Elton John – piano, organ, vocals
- Davey Johnstone – electric guitar, acoustic guitar
- Dee Murray – bass
- Nigel Olsson – drums
- Ray Cooper – tambourine, bells
- David Hentschel – Mellotron
- Carl Wilson – backing vocals
- Bruce Johnston – backing vocals
- Billy Hinsche – backing vocals
- Toni Tennille – backing vocals
- Brian Wilson – backing vocals (uncredited)
- Vocals arranged by Bruce Johnston with help from Daryl Dragon
- Horns arranged by Del Newman

=== Charts ===
==== Weekly charts ====
Weekly chart performance for "Don't Let the Sun Go Down on Me"
Chart (1974)	Peak position
Australia (Kent Music Report)	13
Canada Top Singles (RPM)	1
Canada Adult Contemporary (RPM)	2
Netherlands (Single Top 100)	30
Ireland (IRMA)	17
UK Singles (Official Charts)	16
US Billboard Hot 100	2
US Adult Contemporary (Billboard)	3

==== Year-end charts ====
Year-end chart performance for "Don't Let the Sun Go Down on Me"
Chart (1974)	Position
Brazil (Crowley)	7
Canada Top Singles (RPM)	22
US Billboard Hot 100	78

=== Certifications ===
Certifications for "Don't Let the Sun Go Down on Me"
Region	Certification	Certified units/sales
United Kingdom (BPI)	Silver	200,000^{‡}
United States (RIAA)	Gold	1,000,000^{^}
^{^} Shipments figures based on certification alone.

=== 1986–1987 live version ===
Elton John recorded a live version on 14 December 1986 at the Sydney Entertainment Centre that appears on the Live in Australia with the Melbourne Symphony Orchestra album. In his 2019 autobiography, Me, John claimed that this performance is special because he thought it was the last time he was ever going to sing as he was having a dangerous throat surgery a few days later. An edited version of this same recording was released as a single in 1987 and also appears in the To Be Continued... box set.

=== 1990 MTV Unplugged ===
On 17 May 1990, Elton John recorded a performance on MTV Unplugged at the Chelsea Studios in New York City. An acoustic version of the song was included as a track on The Unplugged Collection, Volume One.

== George Michael and Elton John version ==
"Don't Let the Sun Go Down on Me"
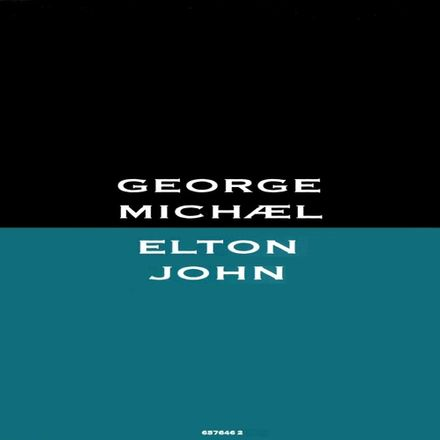

Single by George Michael and Elton John
- B-side: "I Believe (When I Fall in Love It Will Be Forever)" (live)
- Released: 25 November 1991
- Recorded: 23 March 1991
- Venue: Wembley Arena (London)
- Length: 5:47
- Label: Columbia; Epic
- Songwriters: Elton John; Bernie Taupin
- Producer: George Michael

George Michael singles chronology
"Soul Free" (1991)	"Don't Let the Sun Go Down on Me" (1991)	"Too Funky" (1992)

Elton John singles chronology
"Easier to Walk Away" (1990)	"Don't Let the Sun Go Down on Me" (1991)	"The One" (1992)

Music video
- "Don't Let the Sun Go Down on Me" on YouTube

=== Background ===
In 1991, "Don't Let the Sun Go Down on Me" was covered in a live version as a duet by George Michael and Elton John. The pair had first performed the song at the Live Aid concert in 1985 (with Michael singing and John playing, featuring backup vocals by Wham! partner Andrew Ridgeley and Kiki Dee). Six years later, Michael's Cover to Cover tour regularly included the song. Michael brought out John as a surprise guest to sing it with him on two shows of the tour, namely the last of four shows at Wembley Arena, London, on 23 March 1991, and at Rosemont Horizon arena near Chicago on October 20.

=== Reception ===
Released as a single later that year, the song reached number one on both sides of the Atlantic, spending two weeks at number one on the UK Singles Chart in December 1991 and one week on the Billboard Hot 100 chart dated 1 February 1992. The duet also spent two weeks at number one on the Adult Contemporary chart.

This version of the song was also nominated for a Grammy Award for Best Pop Vocal Performance by a Duo or Group with Vocal at the 35th Annual Grammy Awards.

It appears on John's Love Songs, Greatest Hits 1970–2002 and Diamonds compilation albums, as well as his 1993 Duets album. The proceeds from the single were divided among 10 charities for children, AIDS and education.

=== Music video ===
The footage used for the single's music video (directed by Andy Morahan) was taken from a concert at the Rosemont Horizon, Chicago, during Michael's Cover to Cover tour. It is interspersed with footage shot in an airline hangar in Burbank, California, where Michael and John had been rehearsing.

=== Track listings ===
- US and UK 7-inch vinyl and cassette single
1. "Don't Let the Sun Go Down on Me" (duet with Elton John, live at Wembley Arena 23 Mar '91)
2. "I Believe (When I Fall in Love It Will Be Forever)" (live)
- US and UK 12-inch vinyl single
1. "Don't Let the Sun Go Down on Me" (duet with Elton John, live at Wembley Arena 23 Mar '91)
2. "I Believe (When I Fall in Love It Will Be Forever)" (live)
3. "Last Christmas" (performed by Wham!)
- UK and European CD single (Epic 657656)
1. "Don't Let the Sun Go Down on Me" (duet with Elton John, live at Wembley Arena 23 Mar '91)
2. "I Believe (When I Fall in Love It Will Be Forever)" (live)
3. "If You Were My Woman" (live at Wembley Stadium, 11 Jun '88)
4. "Fantasy"
- US CD single (Columbia 44K-74240)
1. "Don't Let the Sun Go Down on Me" (duet with Elton John, live at Wembley Arena 23 Mar '91)
2. "I Believe (When I Fall in Love It Will Be Forever)" (live)
3. "Freedom" (Back to Reality mix)
4. "If You Were My Woman" (live at Wembley Stadium, 11 Jun '88)
- All B-sides and additional tracks were performed solo by George Michael, except "Last Christmas" which is performed by Michael's duo Wham!
- The live version of "I Believe (When I Fall in Love It Will Be Forever)" had previously been issued as the lead track on a free promotional cassette given away at Michael's Wembley Arena gigs in March 1991. It was promoted to urban radio in February 1992.

=== Charts ===
==== Weekly charts ====
Weekly chart performance for the George Michael collaboration
Chart (1991–1992)	Peak position
Australia (ARIA)	3
Austria (Ö3 Austria Top 40)	2
Belgium (Ultratop 50 Flanders)	1
Canada Retail Singles (The Record)	1
Canada Top Singles (RPM)	1
Canada Adult Contemporary (RPM)	1
Denmark (IFPI)	2
Europe (Eurochart Hot 100)	1
Europe (European Hit Radio)	2
Finland (Suomen virallinen lista)	8
France (SNEP)	1
Germany (GfK)	4
Greece (IFPI)	1
Ireland (IRMA)	2
Italy (Musica e dischi)	1
Luxembourg (Radio Luxembourg)	2
Netherlands (Dutch Top 40)	1
Netherlands (Single Top 100)	1
New Zealand (Recorded Music NZ)	4
Norway (VG-lista)	1
Panama (UPI)	3
Portugal (AFP)	1
Sweden (Sverigetopplistan)	2
Switzerland (Schweizer Hitparade)	1
UK Singles (Official Charts)	1
UK Airplay (Music Week)	4
Uruguay (UPI)	9
US Billboard Hot 100	1
US Adult Contemporary (Billboard)	1
US Cash Box Top 100	1

==== Year-end charts ====
1991 year-end chart performance for the George Michael collaboration
Chart (1991)	Position
Italy (Musica e dischi)	84
UK Singles (OCC)	15

1992 year-end chart performance for the George Michael collaboration
Chart (1992)	Position
Australia (ARIA)	57
Austria (Ö3 Austria Top 40)	7
Belgium (Ultratop)	4
Brazil (Crowley)	5
Canada Top Singles (RPM)	12
Canada Adult Contemporary (RPM)	21
Europe (Eurochart Hot 100)	2
Europe (European Hit Radio)	30
Germany (Media Control)	29
Netherlands (Dutch Top 40)	6
Netherlands (Single Top 100)	5
New Zealand (RIANZ)	35
Sweden (Topplistan)	20
Switzerland (Schweizer Hitparade)	7
US Billboard Hot 100	26
US Adult Contemporary (Billboard)	20
US Cash Box Top 100	43

==== Decade-end charts ====
Decade-end chart performance for the George Michael collaboration
Chart (1990–1999)	Position
Austria (Ö3 Austria Top 40)	24
Belgium (Ultratop 50 Flanders)	34
Canada (Nielsen SoundScan)	92
Netherlands (Dutch Top 40)	69

=== Certifications ===
Certifications and sales for the George Michael collaboration
Region	Certification	Certified units/sales
Australia (ARIA)	Platinum	70,000^{‡}
Denmark (IFPI Danmark)	Gold	45,000^{‡}
France (SNEP)	Silver	125,000^{*}
Netherlands (NVPI)	Platinum	100,000^{^}
New Zealand (RMNZ)	2× Platinum	60,000^{‡}
United Kingdom (BPI)	Gold	400,000^{‡}
United States (RIAA)	Gold	500,000^{^}
^{*} Sales figures based on certification alone.^{^} Shipments figures based on certification alone.^{‡} Sales+streaming figures based on certification alone.

== Other versions ==
- American jazz singer Oleta Adams recorded a cover version for the 1991 tribute album Two Rooms: Celebrating the Songs of Elton John & Bernie Taupin. Released as a single, the song peaked at number 33 in the UK, number 11 on the UK Airplay Chart, number 15 in Luxembourg, and number 32 in the Netherlands.
- In 2023, Dolly Parton collaborated with Elton John on her mostly covers collaborative album, Rockstar. For this recording, Parton takes the lead vocals while John plays piano and duets midway in the song.
- A cover version by Roger Daltrey is played during the end credits of the 1987 film The Lost Boys.
