= Little Jeannie =

Single by Elton John

from the album 21 at 33
- B-side: "Conquer the Sun"
- Written: August 1979
- Released: April 1980 (US)
- Recorded: August 1979
- Genre: Soft rock
- Length: 4:46 (single); 5:08 (album)
- Label: Rocket
- Songwriters: Elton John, Gary Osborne
- Producers: Elton John, Clive Franks

Elton John singles chronology
"Johnny B. Goode" (1979)	"Little Jeannie" (1980)	"Sartorial Eloquence (Don't Ya Wanna Play This Game No More?)" (1980)

"Little Jeannie" (spelled "Little Jeanie" on the cover of certain single releases) is a song written by British musician Elton John along with the lyricist Gary Osborne, recorded by John and released as a single in 1980 from his fourteenth studio album 21 at 33.

== Composition ==
Composed in the key of B flat, which allowed its notable saxophone solo to ring out, the song can be described as an uptempo ballad similar in feel, with its electric piano, to his earlier 1973 hit, "Daniel".

== Release ==
"Little Jeannie" reached No.3 on the Billboard Hot 100 in the United States, becoming the singer's biggest US hit since 1976's "Don't Go Breaking My Heart" (a duet with singer Kiki Dee), and his highest-charting solo hit since 1975's "Island Girl". In the US, it would be John's highest-charting single co-written with Osborne, while in the UK, where the song only reached No.33, "Blue Eyes" would eventually hold that honour.

"Little Jeannie" became John's fifth No.1 on the US Adult Contemporary, and was certified Gold by the RIAA. It peaked at No.3 in the Cash Box chart. In Canada, it hit No.1 on the RPM 100 national singles chart.

Despite its impressive performance in the US charts, John has rarely performed "Little Jeannie" live, doing so only on his 1980 tour and during 2000's One Night Only concerts.

== Critical reception ==
Billboard's reviewer noted that "this melodic midtempo ballad recalls the consummate commercial craftsmanship which characterized John's output around the time of Caribou in 1974" and "some brassy horn fills constitute the only real update on John's traditional sound." Cash Box said that "the Latin-flavored percussives and brass add a new exciting dimension to the mid-tempo beat." Record World said that it shows the "stylistic genius that brought us 'Your Song' and other pop ballad hits."

== Personnel ==
- Elton John – lead vocals, backing vocals
- James Newton Howard – Fender Rhodes, Yamaha CS-80
- Richie Zito – acoustic guitar
- Reggie McBride – bass guitar
- Nigel Olsson – drums
- Jim Horn – brass arrangements, piccolo flute, alto saxophone
- Chuck Findley – trombone, trumpet
- Jerry Hey – flugelhorn
- Bill Champlin – backing vocals
- Max Gronenthal – backing vocals
- Dee Murray – backing vocals

== Charts ==
=== Weekly charts ===
Chart (1980–1981)	Peak position
Australia (Kent Music Report)	9
Belgium (Ultratop) Singles Chart	20
Canada Top Singles (RPM)	1
Canada RPM Adult Contemporary	2
German Singles Chart	23
Luxembourg (Radio Luxembourg)	15
New Zealand Singles Chart (RIANZ)	5
South African Singles Chart	8
Switzerland Singles Chart	4
UK Singles Chart	33
US Billboard Hot 100	3
US Adult Contemporary (Billboard)	1

=== Year end charts ===
Year-end chart (1980)	Position
Australia (Kent Music Report)	80
Brazil (Crowley)	18
US Top Pop Singles (Billboard)	16

== Certifications ==
Region	Certification	Certified units/sales
Canada (Music Canada)	Gold	75,000^{^}
United States (RIAA)	Gold	1,000,000^{^}
^{^} Shipments figures based on certification alone.

== See also ==
- List of number-one adult contemporary singles of 1980 (U.S.)
