= Louder Than Concorde Tour =

1976 concert tour by Elton John

- Tour by Elton John
- Program book with the UK tour dates
- Location: Europe; North America
- Associated album: Rock of the Westies
- Start date: 29 April 1976
- End date: 17 August 1976
- Legs: 2
- No. of shows: 30 in United Kingdom; 32 in North America; 62 in total

Elton John concert chronology
- Rock of the Westies Tour (1975); Louder Than Concorde Tour (1976); A Single Man Tour (1979)

The Louder Than Concorde Tour was a concert tour by English musician and composer Elton John, in support of his 10th studio album Rock of the Westies. the tour included two legs (United Kingdom and North America) and a total of 62 shows.

== Tour ==
John and his band recorded the Blue Moves album (and No. 1 hit single "Don't Go Breaking My Heart") in Toronto in March 1976, and began touring the UK on 29 April in Leeds. This leg of the tour, which included a midnight show in Glasgow, ended on 4 June in Cardiff. On 29 June 1976 in Landover, Maryland, the eastern half of the US got the newly named "Louder Than Concorde (But Not Quite As Pretty)" tour, a testament to the onslaught John and his ferocious band were delivering to a country in the midst of its Bicentennial celebration.

On 4 July 1976, John played Schaefer Stadium near Boston. Billie Jean King sang backing vocals and John slipped "Holiday Inn" in to the 20-song set list, a unique event on this tour. Part-way through this leg of the tour, Ray Cooper fell ill and was forced to miss roughly a dozen shows. Ever the punsmith, John declared that the missing percussionist was "Ray Cooper-ating from surgery."

The tour concluded in mid-August with a record-breaking seven sold-out nights at Madison Square Garden. For these shows, John and the band shared the stage with the New York Community Choir and performed encores with Kiki Dee, Alice Cooper and Divine. As this week was winding down, John notified the band that he was taking a break from touring and the group soon disbanded.

== Tour dates ==
Date	City	Country	Venue
Europe
29 April 1976	Leeds	England	Leeds Grand
30 April 1976	Leeds	England	Leeds Grand
1 May 1976	Manchester	England	Manchester Bellevue
2 May 1976	Preston	England	Preston Guildhall
3 May 1976	Liverpool	England	Liverpool Empire
4 May 1976	Liverpool	England	Liverpool Empire
5 May 1976	Leicester	England	De Montfort Hall
6 May 1976	Hanley	England	Victoria Hall
7 May 1976	Wolverhampton	England	Wolverhampton Civic Hall
9 May 1976	Croydon	England	Farfield Hall
11 May 1976	London	England	Earls Court
12 May 1976	London	England	Earls Court
13 May 1976	London	England	Earls Court
14 May 1976	Watford	England	Baileys
16 May 1976	Birmingham	England	Birmingham Odeon
17 May 1976	Birmingham	England	Birmingham Odeon
18 May 1976	Sheffield	England	Sheffield City Hall
20 May 1976	Newcastle	England	Newcastle City Hall
21 May 1976	Edinburgh	Scotland	Usher Hall
22 May 1976	Dundee	Scotland	Caird Hall
24 May 1976	Glasgow	Scotland	Apollo Theatre
25 May 1976	Glasgow	Scotland	Apollo Theatre
27 May 1976	Coventry	England	New Theatre
28 May 1976	Coventry	England	New Theatre
29 May 1976	Southampton	England	Gaumont Theatre
30 May 1976	Taunton	England	Taunton Odeon
31 May 1976	Bristol	England	Bristol Hippodrome
1 June 1976	Bristol	England	Bristol Hippodrome
3 June 1976	Cardiff	England	Cardiff Capitol
4 June 1976	Cardiff	England	Cardiff Capitol
North America
29 June 1976	Landover	United States	Capital Centre
30 June 1976	Landover	United States	Capital Centre
1 July 1976	Landover	United States	Capital Centre
4 July 1976	Foxborough	United States	Schaefer Stadium
6 July 1976	Philadelphia	United States	The Spectrum
7 July 1976	Philadelphia	United States	The Spectrum
8 July 1976	Philadelphia	United States	The Spectrum
11 July 1976	Pontiac	United States	Pontiac Silverdome
13 July 1976	Greensboro	United States	Greensboro Coliseum
14 July 1976	Charlotte	United States	Charlotte Coliseum
16 July 1976	Atlanta	United States	Omni Coliseum
18 July 1976	Tuscaloosa	United States	Memorial Coliseum
20 July 1976	Louisville	United States	Freedom Hall
21 July 1976	Indianapolis	United States	Market Square Arena
24 July 1976	Saint Paul	United States	Saint Paul Civic Center
26 July 1976	Chicago	United States	Chicago Stadium
27 July 1976	Chicago	United States	Chicago Stadium
28 July 1976	Chicago	United States	Chicago Stadium
29 July 1976	Chicago	United States	Chicago Stadium
1 August 1976	Richfield	United States	Richfield Coliseum
2 August 1976	Richfield	United States	Richfield Coliseum
3 August 1976	Cincinnati	United States	Riverfront Coliseum
7 August 1976	Buffalo	United States	Rich Stadium
10 August 1976	New York City	United States	Madison Square Garden
11 August 1976	New York City	United States	Madison Square Garden
12 August 1976	New York City	United States	Madison Square Garden
13 August 1976	New York City	United States	Madison Square Garden
15 August 1976	New York City	United States	Madison Square Garden
16 August 1976	New York City	United States	Madison Square Garden
17 August 1976	New York City	United States	Madison Square Garden

== Set list ==
1. Grow Some Funk of Your Own
2. Goodbye Yellow Brick Road
3. Island Girl
4. Rocket Man
5. Hercules
6. Bennie and the Jets
7. Funeral for a Friend/Love Lies Bleeding
8. Love Song (Lesley Duncan cover)
9. Lucy in the Sky with Diamonds (The Beatles cover)
10. Don't Let the Sun Go Down on Me
11. Empty Sky
12. Someone Saved My Life Tonight
13. Don't Go Breaking My Heart
14. I've Got the Music in Me (Kiki Dee cover)
15. Philadelphia Freedom
16. We All Fall in Love Sometimes
17. Curtains
18. Tell Me When the Whistle Blows

Encore:

1. Saturday Night's Alright for Fighting
2. Your Song
3. Pinball Wizard (The Who cover)

== Personnel ==
- Elton John – lead vocals, piano
- Davey Johnstone – lead guitar, acoustic guitar, backing vocals
- Caleb Quaye – rhythm guitar, backing vocals
- Kenny Passarelli – bass guitar, backing vocals
- Roger Pope – drums
- James Newton Howard – keyboards, electric piano, synthesizer
- Ray Cooper – percussion
- Cindy Bullens – backing vocals
- Jon Joyce – backing vocals
- Ken Gold – backing vocals
