= Rock of the Westies Tour =

1975 concert tour by Elton John

- Tour by Elton John
- Poster for the concert in Los Angeles, USA
- Location: North America
- Associated album: Rock of the Westies
- Start date: 29 September 1975
- End date: 26 October 1975
- Legs: 1
- No. of shows: 17 in the United States; 2 in Canada; 19 in total

Elton John concert chronology
- Caribou Tour (1974); Rock of the Westies Tour (1975); Louder Than Concorde Tour (1976)

The Rock of the Westies Tour was a North American concert tour by English musician and composer Elton John, in support of his 10th studio album Rock of the Westies. The tour included a total of 17 shows across the United States and Canada.

== Background ==
John and his new band (now without Jeff "Skunk" Baxter but including backing vocalists Cindy Bullens, Jon Joyce and Ken Gold) warmed up for their Rock of the Westies Tour by playing five shows in three nights at The Troubadour nightclub in Los Angeles, the place where John had first conquered America exactly five years before. Kiki Dee joined in on these shows, which were benefit concerts for the Jules Stein Foundation and were commemorated by the promotional book "Five Years of Fun".

The western leg of the US tour began on 29 September 1975, at the San Diego Sports Arena, and finished up on 25 and 26 October at Dodger Stadium in Los Angeles, the first time a rock act had played there since The Beatles in 1966. These two shows, the culmination of "Elton John Week" in the city and played in front of 55,000 people each night, were filmed for British television and remain some of the most famous concerts John has ever given. Following opening sets by Emmylou Harris and Joe Walsh, John and the band were later joined on stage by Billie Jean King and the 45-member James Cleveland Choir singing on selected numbers.

== Tour dates ==
Date	City	Country	Venue
North America
29 September 1975	San Diego	United States	San Diego Sports Arena
1 October 1975	Tucson	United States	Tucson Convention Center
2 October 1975	Las Vegas	United States	Las Vegas Convention Center
3 October 1975	Tempe	United States	ASU Activities Center
5 October 1975	Denver	United States	McNichols Sports Arena
6 October 1975	Denver	United States	McNichols Sports Arena
7 October 1975	Salt Lake City	United States	Huntsman Center
12 October 1975	Vancouver	Canada	Pacific Coliseum
13 October 1975	Vancouver	Canada	Pacific Coliseum
14 October 1975	Portland	United States	Portland Memorial Coliseum
16 October 1975	Seattle	United States	Seattle Center Coliseum
17 October 1975	Seattle	United States	Seattle Center Coliseum
19 October 1975	Oakland	United States	Oakland-Alameda County Coliseum
20 October 1975	Oakland	United States	Oakland-Alameda County Coliseum
21 October 1975	Oakland	United States	Oakland-Alameda County Coliseum
25 October 1975	Los Angeles	United States	Dodger Stadium
26 October 1975	Los Angeles	United States	Dodger Stadium

== Set list ==
1. "Your Song"
2. "I Need You to Turn To"
3. "Border Song"
4. "Take Me to the Pilot"
5. "Dan Dare (Pilot of the Future)"
6. "Country Comfort"
7. "Levon"
8. "Rocket Man"
9. "Hercules"
10. "Empty Sky"
11. "Funeral for a Friend/Love Lies Bleeding"
12. "Goodbye Yellow Brick Road"
13. "Bennie and the Jets"
14. "Harmony"
15. "Dixie Lily"
16. "Captain Fantastic and the Brown Dirt Cowboy"
17. "The Bitch Is Back"
18. "Someone Saved My Life Tonight"
19. "Don't Let the Sun Go Down on Me"
20. "Lucy in the Sky with Diamonds" (The Beatles cover)
21. "(Gotta Get A) Meal Ticket"
22. "I Saw Her Standing There" (The Beatles cover)
23. "Island Girl"
24. "Philadelphia Freedom"
25. "We All Fall in Love Sometimes"
26. "Curtains"
27. "Saturday Night's Alright for Fighting"

Encore:

1. "Pinball Wizard" (The Who cover)

== Personnel ==
- Elton John – lead vocals, piano
- Davey Johnstone – lead guitar, acoustic guitar, backing vocals
- Caleb Quaye – rhythm guitar, backing vocals
- Kenny Passarelli – bass guitar, backing vocals
- Roger Pope – drums
- James Newton Howard – keyboards, electric piano, synthesizer
- Ray Cooper – percussion
- Cindy Bullens – backing vocals
- Jon Joyce – backing vocals
- Ken Gold – backing vocals
