= Blue Moves =

Studio album by Elton John
- Released: 22 October 1976
- Recorded: March - June 1976
- Studios: EMI (London); Brother (Santa Monica, California); Sunset Sound (Los Angeles); Eastern Sound (Toronto); Marquee Club Studios (London) (mixing)
- Length: 84:49
- Labels: Rocket; MCA
- Producer: Gus Dudgeon

Elton John chronology
Here and There (1976)	Blue Moves (1976)	Elton John's Greatest Hits Volume II (1977)

Singles from Blue Moves
- 1. "Sorry Seems to Be the Hardest Word" Released: 1 November 1976; 2. "Bite Your Lip (Get Up and Dance!)" Released: 31 January 1977 (US); 3. "Crazy Water" Released: 4 February 1977 (UK)

Blue Moves is the eleventh studio album by British musician Elton John. It was released on 22 October 1976 through John's own Rocket Record Company (his first for the label), alongside MCA Records in certain countries. John's second double album, it was recorded at EMI Studios, Brother Studios, Eastern Sound and Sunset Sound Recorders, and was his last to be produced by longtime collaborator Gus Dudgeon until Ice on Fire (1985). Additionally, the album would be the last collaboration between John and lyricist Bernie Taupin for the next few years (Note: Aside from the 1978 non-album single "Ego", originally written for but not included on Blue Moves) until a partial resumption of their working partnership with 21 at 33 (1980).

The music on Blue Moves is considered some of John's most experimental, fusing genres such as pop, gospel, disco and jazz while also including orchestral elements and extended song lengths. Guests on the album include David Crosby, Graham Nash, Bruce Johnston and Toni Tennille contributing backing vocals, alongside performances by both the Martyn Ford Orchestra and London Symphony Orchestra, the former of which performing string arrangements by Paul Buckmaster.

Upon its release, Blue Moves received mixed reviews. Some critics found the album to be excessive, while others felt it did not include enough strong material to warrant its length. However, some retrospective reviews have been more positive, highlighting it as one of John's most underrated releases and praising its experimental nature, and John himself has declared it one of his favorites. Blue Moves reached number 3 on the US Billboard 200, breaking his streak of number one albums there, while it matched that position on the UK Albums Chart. The album's first single, "Sorry Seems to Be the Hardest Word", reached the top 10 in the US and the top 20 in the UK, while further singles "Bite Your Lip (Get Up and Dance!)" and "Crazy Water" (only released in the UK) both reached the top 30. The album would go on to be certified both Platinum by the RIAA and Gold by the BPI.

== Background ==
John's previous album Rock of the Westies (1975) was his first since 1970's Elton John to not include any contributions from longtime Elton John Band members Dee Murray and Nigel Olsson on bass and drums respectively, as they had been fired after the recording of Captain Fantastic and the Brown Dirt Cowboy (1975). Both of these albums debuted at number one on the Billboard 200, the first two albums in history to do so, with the latter containing the US number four hit "Someone Saved My Life Tonight" and the former spawning the number one single "Island Girl". In June 1976, "Don't Go Breaking My Heart", a duet with Kiki Dee, was released as a standalone single and also topped the US Billboard Hot 100 chart.

After embarking on the Rock of the Westies Tour and Louder Than Concorde Tour in 1975 and 1976, respectively, John decided to take an indefinite break from touring. In an October 1976 interview with Rolling Stone, John expressed his desire to focus on other projects for the time being, saying he felt it would be "silly" to keep his band members under a contract for an additional year while not being sure what his plans for future performing would be. While Davey Johnstone, Ray Cooper, and James Newton Howard continued to collaborate with John following the release of Blue Moves, the album marked the last time John worked with Caleb Quaye and drummer Roger Pope. In the same interview John came out publicly as bisexual, stating "There's nothing wrong with going to bed with somebody of your own sex. I think everybody's bisexual to a certain degree"; he would later come out as gay in 1992.

== Overview ==
"Cage the Songbird" was a tribute to legendary French singer Edith Piaf, and a year or so later was covered by Kiki Dee on an unreleased Rocket album Cage the Songbird, which finally was issued in 2008. ("Songbird" originated as part of the Rock of the Westies sessions, but was not completed during them, probably because the song's acoustic, delicate sound did not fit with the more rock 'n' roll approach of the rest of the songs that made the Westies final track list.) The Beach Boys turned down "Chameleon" (which was written two years prior to the album's release), but Bruce Johnston, a former Beach Boy, performed backing vocals on John's version, along with former Beach Boys touring member Toni Tennille. John also performed the song at Wembley Stadium in 1975, where he also performed the Captain Fantastic and the Brown Dirt Cowboy album in its entirety. An excerpt from "Out of the Blue" was used for the closing titles on Top Gear until the end of that Top Gear format (in 2001).

The basic tracks for Blue Moves were recorded at Eastern Sound in Toronto, Ontario. Additional overdubs were done at EMI Studios in Abbey Road, London; Brother Studios in Santa Monica, California; and Sunset Sound in Los Angeles, California. The album was mixed at Marquee Studios in London.

John has played several songs from Blue Moves live: "Sorry Seems to Be the Hardest Word", "Bite Your Lip (Get Up and Dance!)", "One Horse Town", "Tonight", "Idol" and "Crazy Water" have been played during various concert appearances through the years.

In the summer of 2011, George Michael embarked on what would be his final tour, the orchestral Symphonica Tour of Europe, the UK, and Australia. From the 19 September concert at Budapest Sports Arena, Michael performed "Idol" in place of "It Doesn't Really Matter" on the setlist. At a special gig in the Royal Albert Hall raising money for the Elton John AIDS Foundation, Michael introduced the song, saying: "This next song was written by someone I hope has made it in here already – Elton. It's a song he wrote in the late 70s and it's about an ageing pop star. Funny that." As Michael cast his gaze around the audience, John waved from the stalls, where he sat beside his civil partner David Furnish and broadcaster Janet Street-Porter. Having already recorded his own version of "Tonight" for the Two Rooms album in 1991, Michael's vocals at that concert ended up on 2014's Symphonica.

== Reception ==
Professional ratings
Review scores
Source	Rating
AllMusic	3/5 stars
Christgau's Record Guide	C
The Encyclopedia of Popular Music	2/5 stars
Rolling Stone	(not rated)

Blue Moves has received mixed reviews since its release. A contemporary review for Rolling Stone said the album "contains nowhere near enough good songs to justify the extended length" and that the interludes and instrumentals were done "to the exclusion of sense". Village Voice critic Robert Christgau described it as "impossibly weepy" and "excessive". Lindsay Planer of Allmusic later said the album showed the "inevitable fatigue" of John's "immense creativity" that had helped create the previous albums of his career.

== Track listing ==
All tracks written by Elton John and Bernie Taupin, except where noted.

Side one
No.	Title	Writer(s)	Length
1.	"Your Starter For..."	Caleb Quaye	1:23
2.	"Tonight"		7:52
3.	"One Horse Town"	John; Taupin; James Newton Howard	5:56
4.	"Chameleon"		5:27

Side two
No.	Title	Writer(s)	Length
1.	"Boogie Pilgrim"	John; Taupin; Davey Johnstone; Quaye	6:05
2.	"Cage the Songbird"	John; Taupin; Johnstone	3:27
3.	"Crazy Water"		5:42
4.	"Shoulder Holster"		5:10

Side three
No.	Title	Writer(s)	Length
1.	"Sorry Seems to Be the Hardest Word"		3:48
2.	"Out of the Blue"		6:14
3.	"Between Seventeen and Twenty"	John; Taupin; Johnstone; Quaye	5:17
4.	"The Wide-Eyed and Laughing"	John; Taupin; Newton Howard; Johnstone; Quaye	3:27
5.	"Someone's Final Song"		4:10

Side four
No.	Title	Writer(s)	Length
1.	"Where's the Shoorah?"		4:09
2.	"If There's a God in Heaven (What's He Waiting For?)"	John; Taupin; Johnstone	4:25
3.	"Idol"		4:08
4.	"Theme From a Non-Existent TV Series"		1:19
5.	"Bite Your Lip (Get Up and Dance!)"		6:43
Total length:			85:07

Note: Initial CD versions of the album maintain the same running order, but omit various combinations of the following tracks: "Cage the Songbird", "Shoulder Holster", "The Wide-Eyed and Laughing" and "Where's the Shoorah?". It has since been remastered and re-released as a 2-CD set retaining the original LP track listing.

== Personnel ==
Track numbering refers to the 2-CD and digital releases of the album.

=== Musicians ===
- Elton John – acoustic piano (1–5, 7–10, 13–16, 18), vocals (2–9, 12–16, 18), vocalese (11), harmonium (14), harpsichord (17)
- Michael Brecker – saxophone (5, 8, 16)
- Randy Brecker – trumpet (5, 8, 16)
- Ray Cooper – glockenspiel (1, 17), marimba (1, 17), gong (3), tambourine (3, 5, 7, 8, 11, 15), vibraphone (3, 4, 9, 10), bells (3), shaker (4, 6, 11), triangle (6), finger cymbals (6), congas (7, 10, 11, 15, 18), rototom (12)
- Carl Fortina – accordion (8)
- Michael Hurwitz – cello (3)
- Davey Johnstone – mandolin (2, 11, 17), electric guitar (3, 7, 10, 15), slide guitar (5, 18), acoustic guitar (6), dulcimer (6), sitar (12)
- James Newton Howard – synthesizers (1, 3, 6, 10, 12, 13, 17, 18), Fender Rhodes (3, 9, 13, 17), Hammond organ (5, 11, 15), mellotron (6), clavinet (7)
- Kenny Passarelli – bass guitar (1, 3–5, 7–11, 14–18)
- Roger Pope – drums (1, 3–5, 7, 8, 10, 11, 15–18)
- Caleb Quaye – acoustic guitar (1, 4, 6, 12, 17), electric guitar (3, 4, 7, 10, 11, 15, 18), guitar solo (3, 10, 15), 12-string guitar (12)
- Barry Rogers – trombone (5, 8, 16)
- David Sanborn – saxophone (5, 8, 16)
- Orchestra and Orchestral Arrangements
- Harry Bluestone – strings leader (18)
- Paul Buckmaster – string arrangements and conductor (3, 7, 15), brass arrangements (7)
- The Martyn Ford Orchestra – strings (3, 7, 15), brass (7)
- The London Symphony Orchestra – strings (2, 9)
- The Gene Page Strings – strings (18)
- Richard Studt – strings leader (3, 7, 12, 15), brass leader (7)
- Backing Vocalists, Choir and Vocal Arrangements
- Curt Becher – backing vocals (4, 10, 11, 13), BGV arrangements (11, 13)
- Cindy Bullens – backing vocals (4, 7, 11)
- Clark Burroughs – backing vocals (13)
- Joe Chemay – backing vocals (11, 13)
- Rev. James Cleveland – choir director (5, 14, 18)
- The Cornerstone Institutional Baptist Church and the Southern California Community Choir – choirs (5, 14, 18)
- David Crosby – backing vocals (6, 12)
- Daryl Dragon – BGV arrangements (7)
- Ron Hicklin – backing vocals (4, 7)
- Bruce Johnston – backing vocals (4, 7, 10, 11, 13), BGV arrangements (4, 11, 13)
- Jon Joyce – backing vocals (4, 7, 11)
- Gene Morford – backing vocals (4, 7)
- Graham Nash – backing vocals (6, 12)
- Toni Tennille – backing vocals (4, 7, 10, 13)

=== Production ===
- Producer and liner notes – Gus Dudgeon
- Engineers – Arun Chakraverty, Gus Dudgeon, Mark Howlett, John Kurlander, Earle Mankey and John Stewart
- Remixing – Gus Dudgeon and Phil Dunne
- Cutting engineer – Arun Chakraverty
- Art direction and coordination – David Costa
- Photography – David Nutter
- Painting – Patrick Procktor

== Charts ==
=== Weekly charts ===
Chart (1976–1977)	Peak position
Australian Albums (Kent Music Report)	8
Canada Top Albums/CDs (RPM)	4
Danish Albums (Hitlisten)	5
Dutch Albums (Album Top 100)	7
Finnish Albums (The Official Finnish Charts)	22
German Albums (Offizielle Top 100)	39
Italian Albums (Musica e Dischi)	9
Japanese Albums (Oricon)	53
New Zealand Albums (RMNZ)	7
Norwegian Albums (VG-lista)	5
Spanish Albums (AFYVE)	10
Swedish Albums (Sverigetopplistan)	12
UK Albums (Official Charts)	3
US Billboard 200	3

=== Year-end charts ===
Chart (1976)	Position
Canada Top Albums/CDs (RPM)	34
Dutch Albums (Album Top 100)	41

Chart (1977)	Position
Australian Albums (Kent Music Report)	61
Canada Top Albums/CDs (RPM)	53
US Billboard 200	80

== Certifications ==
Region	Certification	Certified units/sales
Australia (ARIA)	Platinum	50,000^{^}
Canada (Music Canada)	Gold	50,000^{^}
France (SNEP)	Gold	100,000^{*}
Netherlands (NVPI)	Gold	50,000^{^}
United Kingdom (BPI)	Gold	100,000^{^}
United States (RIAA)	Platinum	1,000,000^{^}
^{*} Sales figures based on certification alone.^{^} Shipments figures based on certification alone.
