= Revamp & Restoration =

2018 dual tribute album to Elton John and Bernie Taupin

Revamp: Reimagining the Songs of Elton John & Bernie Taupin

Compilation album by various artists
- Released: 6 April 2018
- Label: Island
- Producers: Daniel Crean; Justin Tranter; Wes Period; Bill Rahko; Peter Asher; Oak Felder; "Downtown" Trevor Brown; Zaire Koalo; Emile Haynie; Charlie Hugall; Blake Mills; Bizness Boi; TH3ory; Darhyl "DJ" Camper Jr.; Q-Tip; Jacknife Lee; Brendan Grieve; Steve Fitzmaurice; Andrew Wyatt; Greg Kurstin; Mark Ronson; Josh Homme

Singles from Revamp: Reimagining the Songs of Elton John & Bernie Taupin
- 1. "Don't Go Breaking My Heart" Released: March 15, 2018

Restoration: Reimagining the Songs of Elton John and Bernie Taupin

Compilation album by various artists
- Released: 6 April 2018
- Label: Universal Nashville
- Producers: Frank Liddell; Mike McCarthy; busbee; Don Henley; Vince Gill; Jay Joyce; Glenn Worf; Eric Masse; Dave Cobb; Chris Stapleton; Kyle Ryan; Andrew Wyatt; Jon Randall Stewart; John Leventhal

Singles from Restoration: Reimagining the Songs of Elton John and Bernie Taupin
- 1. "I Want Love" Released: March 15, 2018; 2. "Rocket Man" Released: March 23, 2018

Revamp: Reimagining the Songs of Elton John & Bernie Taupin and Restoration: Reimagining the Songs of Elton John and Bernie Taupin are two tribute albums to British musician Elton John and his frequent songwriting partner Bernie Taupin, both released on 6 April 2018. Revamp was described as John's project and features covers of the duo's back catalogue by pop, rock and R&B artists, whereas Restoration was seen as Taupin's project and features covers by country music artists. Revamp was released via Island Records and Restoration by Universal Music Group Nashville. The release of the albums coincided with John's 2018–2023 Farewell Yellow Brick Road tour.

The cover of "Mona Lisas and Mad Hatters" by Maren Morris which appears on Restoration was nominated for the Grammy Award for Best Country Solo Performance at the 61st Annual Grammy Awards.

== Background ==
On the decision to release two separate albums encompassing different genres, Bernie Taupin told Rolling Stone:

From day one we borrowed from everything that's good about American music – whether it's blues, country, gospel, pop, pure rock – everything got thrown in the mix. It would be tiring if you just got stuck in one niche your entire career, especially when it's one as long as ours.

According to Elton John, "We have two completely different albums; Revamp being the pop one and Restoration being the country one and God we have so many great artists doing our songs, it's quite incredible." Of his Revamp record, John told E!:

It's always a huge compliment when an artist loves your song enough to take the time and effort to rework it. As songwriters, Bernie [Taupin] and myself are thrilled when singers we admire and respect as much as those on Revamp and Restoration choose to add their own unique twist in the process. It means that our music is still relevant and ultimately that our songs continue to reach new audiences. We're humbled and thank them all for their generosity.

He added, "On Revamp, I wrote out a wish list of people that I would love and asked them and to my surprise most of them said yes and we have quite an astonishing eclectic crew."

Of Taupin's Restoration record, John said, "Restoration was Bernie's project and he's a huge country fan. He came up with an astonishing list of country performers both new and legendary".

== Cover art ==
The Revamp album features a pop-art style cover based on the Terry O'Neill photograph of John, recreated in neon. The Restoration artwork was created by Taupin who wanted to emphasise the role that American culture played in his and John's careers, stating:

For me, there's an irony about the American flag. It's been battered and beaten and burned, but it's resilient. It's always come back. I incorporate it with other things, and lately I've done a lot of pieces with deconstructed guitars and other found materials: barbed wire, broken bottles, things that people identify with on an everyday level. If it's on the floor and it works, I'll put it into the artwork. But it all goes hand in hand with my belief in America and my interest, I would say obsession, with Americana."

== Reception ==
Reviews of the two albums generally favoured the country reinterpretations of the John/Taupin catalogue, with significantly greater critical praise going to Taupin's Restoration volume than to John's Revamp. The Metacritic score for Revamp, which averages professional reviews from a wide range of media sources, was 58, indicating "mixed or average reviews". Meanwhile, the site assigned a score of 84 to Restoration, indicating "universal acclaim".

The professional consensus in favour of Restoration centered around what was perceived as this volume embracing both riskier and rootsier arrangements. Stephen Thomas Erlewine of AllMusic called Revamp "slickly produced" and "dull", though giving praise to tracks cut by Alessia Cara, Miley Cyrus, Q-Tip & Demi Lovato, and Queens of the Stone Age. The same reviewer noted that on Restoration, "the artists take risks, and they -- and the songbook -- come out sounding the better for it."

Chris Willman of Variety, while praising individual tracks by Coldplay and Sam Smith, opined that "the list of predictably commercial names that fills out Revamp sits at the intersection of tasteful and cash-grabby" and that "this feels like an album designed more to move tickets for his farewell tour." Conversely, Willman had little but positive things to say about Restoration, singling out 10 of its tracks for special praise and noting of its country feel, "with Restoration, it’s a treat to get reacquainted with Las Cruces Elton."

Jody Rosen of Rolling Stone gave three stars to Revamp, stating that the "best moments on Revamp, featuring big names from pop, rock and R&B, are those least faithful to the originals." Rosen gave four stars to Restoration, calling it "a revelation".

In a three-star review of Revamp, Michael Hann of The Guardian wrote that "When it's good, Revamp is very good. When it's bad, it's awful."

== Revamp ==
Professional ratings
Aggregate scores
Source	Rating
Metacritic	58/100
Review scores
Source	Rating
AllMusic	2.5/5 stars
The Guardian	3/5 stars
Rolling Stone	3/5 stars

=== Track listing ===
All tracks are written by Elton John and Bernie Taupin.

No.	Title	Artist(s)	Length
1.	"Bennie and the Jets"	Elton John, Pink and Logic	3:11
2.	"We All Fall in Love Sometimes"	Coldplay	4:00
3.	"I Guess That's Why They Call It the Blues"	Alessia Cara	4:31
4.	"Candle in the Wind"	Ed Sheeran	3:19
5.	"Tiny Dancer"	Florence and the Machine	6:01
6.	"Someone Saved My Life Tonight"	Mumford & Sons	6:09
7.	"Sorry Seems to Be the Hardest Word"	Mary J. Blige	3:16
8.	"Don't Go Breaking My Heart"	Q-Tip featuring Demi Lovato	4:06
9.	"Mona Lisas and Mad Hatters"	The Killers	4:56
10.	"Daniel"	Sam Smith	4:10
11.	"Don't Let the Sun Go Down on Me"	Miley Cyrus	5:36
12.	"Your Song"	Lady Gaga	4:16
13.	"Goodbye Yellow Brick Road"	Queens of the Stone Age	3:11

Japanese edition bonus tracks
No.	Title	Artist(s)	Length
14.	"I'm Still Standing"	Takuya Ōhashi (Sukima Switch)	3:02

=== Charts ===
Chart (2018)	Peak position
Australian Albums (ARIA)	5
Austrian Albums (Ö3 Austria)	17
Belgian Albums (Ultratop Flanders)	38
Belgian Albums (Ultratop Wallonia)	98
Dutch Albums (MegaCharts)	101
German Albums (Offizielle Top 100)	31
New Zealand Albums (RMNZ)	7
Norwegian Albums (VG-lista)	28
Swiss Albums (Schweizer Hitparade)	17
US Billboard 200	13

== Restoration ==
Professional ratings
Aggregate scores
Source	Rating
Metacritic	84/100
Review scores
Source	Rating
AllMusic	4.5/5 stars
Rolling Stone	4/5 stars

=== Track listing ===
All tracks are written by Elton John and Bernie Taupin.

No.	Title	Artist(s)	Length
1.	"Rocket Man"	Little Big Town	4:47
2.	"Mona Lisas and Mad Hatters"	Maren Morris	5:04
3.	"Sacrifice"	Don Henley and Vince Gill	5:27
4.	"Take Me to the Pilot"	Brothers Osborne	3:55
5.	"My Father's Gun"	Miranda Lambert	4:39
6.	"I Want Love"	Chris Stapleton	4:32
7.	"Honky Cat"	Lee Ann Womack	5:17
8.	"Roy Rogers"	Kacey Musgraves	3:36
9.	"Please"	Rhonda Vincent and Dolly Parton	4:16
10.	"The Bitch Is Back"	Miley Cyrus	3:33
11.	"Sad Songs (Say So Much)"	Dierks Bentley	4:14
12.	"This Train Don't Stop There Anymore"	Rosanne Cash and Emmylou Harris	5:04
13.	"Border Song"	Willie Nelson	3:24

=== Charts ===
Chart (2018)	Peak position
Australian Albums (ARIA)	57
Belgian Albums (Ultratop Flanders)	181
New Zealand Heatseeker Albums (RMNZ)	9
Swiss Albums (Swiss Hitparade)	59
US Billboard 200	36
US Billboard Country Albums	4

== Grammy salute ==
On 10 April 2018, CBS aired I'm Still Standing: A Grammy Salute to Sir Elton John which featured artists performing songs from the John/Taupin songbook, including many of the artists who recorded songs for Revamp and Restoration. At the end of the broadcast, John and Taupin were given a special Grammy Award: the President's Award.

=== Performers ===
- Miley Cyrus - "The Bitch Is Back"
- Ed Sheeran - "Candle in the Wind"
- Sam Smith - "Daniel"
- Alessia Cara - "I Guess That's Why They Call It the Blues"
- Lady Gaga - "Your Song"
- Little Big Town - "Rocket Man"
- Shawn Mendes and SZA - "Don't Go Breaking My Heart"
- Maren Morris - "Mona Lisas and Mad Hatters"
- Chris Martin - "We All Fall in Love Sometimes"
- Miranda Lambert - "My Father's Gun"
- Kesha - "Goodbye Yellow Brick Road"
- John Legend - "Don't Let the Sun Go Down On Me"
- Elton John - "Bennie and the Jets", "Philadelphia Freedom" and "I'm Still Standing" (with ensemble)

=== House band ===
- Davey Johnstone – guitar, musical director, backing vocals
- Nigel Olsson – drums, backing vocals
- John Mahon – percussion, backing vocals
- Kim Bullard – keyboards
- Matt Bissonette – bass guitar, backing vocals
- Adam Chester - piano, strings conductor, backing vocals

Christopher Jackson, Gayle King and Neil Patrick Harris provided recitations of Taupin's lyrics accompanied by Valerie Simpson and Jon Batiste. Additionally, Harris, Anna Kendrick, Lucy Liu, and Hailee Steinfeld served as hosts introducing some of the performances. Neil Portnow presented John and Taupin with their awards on behalf of the Recording Academy.

== See also ==
- Two Rooms: Celebrating the Songs of Elton John & Bernie Taupin
