= The Starship =

Aircraft used by touring musicians

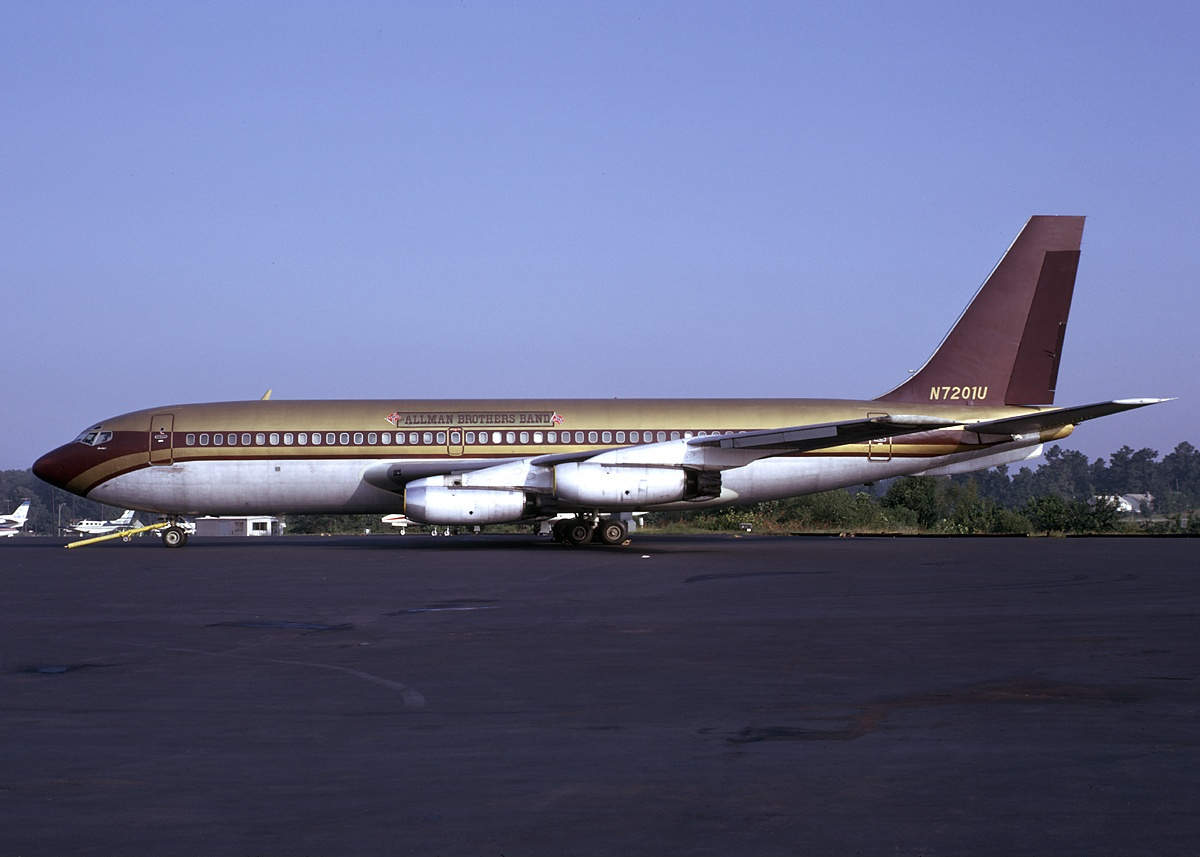
- The Starship being used by the Allman Brothers Band for their tour in 1974

General information
- Type: Boeing 720
- Manufacturer: Boeing
- Owners: United Airlines; Bobby Sherman and Ward Sylvester
- Construction number: 17907
- Registration: N7201U

History
- Fate: Dismantled for parts

The Starship was a former United Airlines Boeing 720 passenger jet, bought by Bobby Sherman and his manager, Ward Sylvester, and leased to touring musical artists in the mid-1970s.

== History ==
The Starship, N7201U (S/N: 17907), was the first Boeing 720 built. It was delivered to United Airlines in October 1960 and then purchased in 1973 by Contemporary Entertainment.

English rock band Led Zeppelin used the aircraft for their 1973 and 1975 North American concert tours. During the 1972 tour and in the early part of the 1973 tour the band had hired a small private Falcon Jet to transport its members from city to city, but these aircraft are comparatively light and susceptible to turbulence. After performing a show at Kezar Stadium in San Francisco in 1973, Led Zeppelin encountered bad turbulence on a flight back to Los Angeles. As a result, the band's manager Peter Grant resolved to hire The Starship for the remainder of the tour, at a cost of $30,000.

The aircraft was the same type as used by commercial airlines. Its owners had it modified to suit the whims of their clients. Sherman and Sylvester invested $200,000 to reduce the seating capacity to 40, and install a bar, seats and tables, revolving arm chairs, a 30-foot-long (9.1 m) couch (along the right side of the plane, opposite the bar), a TV set and a video cassette player with a well-stocked video library. An electronic organ was built into the bar, and at the rear of the craft were two back rooms, one with a low couch and pillows on the floor, and the other, a bedroom, complete with a white fur bedspread and shower room. The exterior of the plane was painted with Led Zeppelin on the fuselage.

Flying on The Starship, Led Zeppelin were no longer required to change hotels as often. They could base themselves in large cities such as Chicago, New York City, Dallas and Los Angeles and travel to and from concerts within flying distance. After each show, the band members were transported by limousine from the concert venue to the airport, as depicted in the Led Zeppelin concert film The Song Remains the Same.

The Starship was used throughout Led Zeppelin's 1975 US concert tour, this time featuring a red-and-blue paint scheme with white stars similar to the United States flag with a smaller "Led Zeppelin" logo on the fuselage. According to Peter Grant, at one point during this tour Led Zeppelin drummer John Bonham sat in the co-pilot's seat and assisted in flying the plane from New York to Los Angeles.

The Starship is included at the end of "Stairway to Heaven" on disc 2 of the Led Zeppelin DVD with both its 1973 and 1975 paint schemes.

English rock band Deep Purple hired The Starship for their 1974 US tours. In an interview with Circus magazine in 1974, Deep Purple's Jon Lord explained: "It's a 707 put together by a firm in L.A. that Sinatra, Dylan and The Band just used and Elton John uses. It has a lounge, a bedroom, a shower and a study. It's supposed to look as little as a plane as possible." According to Gregg Allman, when The Allman Brothers Band chartered the plane, they found "Welcome Allman Bros" written on the plane's bar in lines of cocaine once they boarded.

The Rolling Stones and Alice Cooper were also Starship clients. Peter Frampton was the last to charter The Starship, in 1976. As early as Alice Cooper's 1974 tour the aircraft was beginning to show signs of engine difficulties, and by the time of Led Zeppelin's 1977 US Tour it was permanently grounded at Long Beach Airport. The band was forced to find a comparable alternative, and tour manager Richard Cole eventually chartered Caesar's Chariot, a 45-seat Boeing 720 owned by the Caesars Palace Hotel in Las Vegas.

The Starship had several ownership changes from 1977 to 1979 until it went into storage at Luton Airport in Bedfordshire, England. It was dismantled for parts starting in July 1982.

== Usage ==
Band	Dates Used	Tour
Led Zeppelin	June - July 1973	Led Zeppelin North American Tour 1973
Elton John	August - September 1973	Goodbye Yellow Brick Road Tour
Sonny & Cher	September 1973	
The Moody Blues	October - November 1973	1973 Tour
Alice Cooper	December 1973	Billion Dollar Babies Holliday Tour
Bob Dylan and The Band	January - February 1974	Bob Dylan and the Band 1974 Tour
Deep Purple	March - April 1974	Burn Tour
The Allman Brothers Band	June - August 1974	1974 Tour
Elton John	September - October 1974	Elton John Band Tour 1974
John Lennon	November 1974	Single Use
Deep Purple	November - December 1974	Stormbringer Tour
Led Zeppelin	January - March 1975	Led Zeppelin North American Tour 1975
John Denver	April - May 1975	
The Rolling Stones	June - August 1975	Tour of the Americas '75
Elton John	September - October 1975	West Of The Rockies Tour
The Allman Brothers Band	November - December 1975	Win, Lose or Draw Tour
Olivia Newton-John	Early 1976	
Elton John	June - August 1976	Louder Than Concorde Tour
Peter Frampton	September - October 1976	Frampton Comes Alive! Tour

Other users include Frank Sinatra, Three Dog Night and Gary Wright.

== See also ==
- Caesar's Chariot
