= Maxine Feibelman =

Muse and former wife of Bernie Taupin (born 1952)

- Born: 1952 (age 73–74)
- Other names: Maxine Feibelman Taupin; Maxine Taupin
- Occupations: Seamstress; art collector
- Spouse: Bernie Taupin (m. 1971; div. 1977)

Maxine Feibelman (born 1952) is an American seamstress and art collector mostly known for being married for several years to Elton John's long-term collaborator Bernie Taupin. Her romance, marriage, and break-up with Taupin influenced some of Taupin's and John's songs. She provided the title and refrain for one of their songs. She also supported John's path toward his distinct stage costume style.

== Personal life ==
Feibelman met Bernie Taupin in 1970, when Elton John's drummer Nigel Olsson needed a hair dryer. A friend brought a hair dryer to the band's hotel, and the friend also brought along Feibelman, and the relationship between Feibelman and Taupin began to develop at that first meeting. Not long afterward, she regularly accompanied Taupin on group events, and she showed him around the Los Angeles area, to which he eventually moved permanently. Taupin and Feibelman married in Lincolnshire, U.K., on March 27, 1971, with John as the best man, and the bride given away by her father, retired US air force Lt. Col. Max Feibelman. They divorced in October 1977, and after their divorce, Taupin said he remained friends with Feibelman, saying: "She's very happy with my bassist." (The bassist, Kenny Passarelli, was Bernie's best friend at the time.)

== Songs influenced ==
=== "Tiny Dancer" ===
"Tiny Dancer" is the first track on Elton John's album Madman Across the Water (1971). During the early stages of Taupin's and Feibelman's courtship, Taupin wrote the lyrics of "Tiny Dancer" to celebrate his feelings for her, including literal details about Feibelman. She served as seamstress for the Elton John band, traveling with John's entourage during his first U.S. tour and making repairs when needed to the band's clothing. In 1973, Taupin was asked directly whether the song is about Feibelman, and he answered: "That's true, yes." In 1974, Taupin said: "I've never written a song meaning something more than it says." Later, Taupin observed that the song also captured the spirit of those years with all of the women he got to know when he moved to California.

=== "I Feel Like a Bullet (In the Gun of Robert Ford)" ===
When Taupin's and Feibelman's marriage began to deteriorate prior to 1976, the breakdown of their relationship motivated the creation of the song "I Feel Like a Bullet (In the Gun of Robert Ford)", with music by Elton John and lyrics by Bernie Taupin, which was the fifth track on John's album Rock of the Westies. Taupin's lyrics for the song may be interpreted as an apologetic message from Taupin to Feibelman. In the song, Taupin takes much of the blame for the situation, comparing himself to the fatal bullet with which outlaw Jesse James was shot in the back, through lyrics such as, "I'm low as a paid assassin is / You know I'm cold as a hired sword / I'm so ashamed / Can't we patch it up?"

=== "Between Seventeen and Twenty" ===
"Between Seventeen and Twenty", a song by Elton John with lyrics by Bernie Taupin, is the eleventh track on Elton John's 1976 album Blue Moves. Music historians consider the song to be inspired by how Taupin felt when he discovered that Feibelman was having an affair with the Elton John band's bass player, Kenny Passarelli. The title refers to the age difference between Bernie and Feibelman, because he was 20 years old when he met her, and she was 17. One biographer describes the song as "a thinly veiled rebuke to [Taupin's] estranged wife, Maxine, now sharing the bed of Kenny Passarelli, who was playing on this very track", particularly in the lyrics: "I wonder who's sleeping in your sheets tonight / Whose head rests upon the bed / Could it be a close friend I knew so well / Who seems to be so close to you instead?"

=== "The Bitch Is Back" ===
The first track (and second single released from) on the 1974 album Caribou, "The Bitch Is Back", with music by Elton John and lyrics by Bernie Taupin, was certified Gold on September 13, 1995, by the Recording Industry Association of America, despite limited airplay because of reluctance to broadcast the word "bitch". The song's title and repeated refrain was a direct quote of Feibelman, who said "the bitch is back" whenever John was in a bad mood.

=== "Mellow" ===
"Mellow" is a song by Elton John with lyrics by Bernie Taupin, the second track on his 1972 album Honky Château. "Mellow" has been interpreted as a reflection on Taupin's and Feibelman's happiness with life as a married couple in their mansion in Lincolnshire. Taupin's lyrics appear to speak directly to Feibelman: "I love your Roman nose, the way you curl your toes."

=== Blue Moves album ===
The breakup of Bernie Taupin's marriage to Feibelman was reflected sharply, according to music historians, through the melancholy mood of Elton John's Blue Moves album. A biographer writes that Taupin was at a low point personally by mid-1976, mainly because of marital difficulties, and that Taupin's "almost exclusively downbeat lyrics about doomed relationships, unrequited love, and hurt also suited Elton's own fragile state".

=== "Lovesick" ===
The song "Lovesick", by Elton John with lyrics by Bernie Taupin, appears as a bonus track – the 15th track – on John's 1978 album A Single Man. Despite the liveliness of the melody, the unhappy lyrics by Taupin were written near his divorce from Feibelman during the sessions for the album Blue Moves, and along with songs on that album it reflects Taupin's moods in full marital crisis.

=== "I Cry at Night" ===
"I Cry at Night", a song by Elton John with lyrics by Bernie Taupin, is the 14th track (a bonus track) on the remastered edition of Elton John's 1978 album A Single Man, and was released as B-side to "Part-time Love". This song was written and recorded during sessions for the Blue Moves album, when Taupin was struggling with the breakdown of his marriage to Feibelman. A noted biographer says that at that time "[e]veryone was coming unglued. Taupin, his wife ... it's there, all the pain in every line. I mean check out even the words to 'I Cry at Night'."

== Distinct stage costume style ==
Elton John credited Feibelman, as his band's seamstress, with starting him on the road toward his distinctive stage-costume style. In 1973, John told an interviewer: "Maxine had gone out and said [imitating Maxine], 'Oooh, I've found these mauve tights, I bet you wouldn't wear them onstage.'" John later explained that Feibelman gave him a "Fillmore West T-shirt, which was mauve, purple ... and a pair of mauve tights", which he wore with "silver boots with stars" and flew "horizontal through the air" because "Maxine had dared [him]".
