= Sorry Seems to Be the Hardest Word =

1976 single by Elton John

Single by Elton John

from the album Blue Moves
- B-side: "Shoulder Holster"
- Released: 1 November 1976
- Recorded: 22 March 1976
- Studio: Eastern Sound, Toronto, Ontario, Canada
- Length: 3:48
- Label: Rocket (UK); MCA (US)
- Songwriters: Elton John; Bernie Taupin
- Producer: Gus Dudgeon

Elton John singles chronology
"Don't Go Breaking My Heart" (1976)	"Sorry Seems to Be the Hardest Word" (1976)	"Bite Your Lip (Get Up and Dance!)" (1977)

Music video
- "Sorry Seems to Be the Hardest Word" on YouTube

"Sorry Seems to Be the Hardest Word" is a song written by British musician Elton John and lyricist Bernie Taupin. It was recorded by John and released in 1976, both as a single and as part of the Blue Moves album. It was John's second single released by The Rocket Record Company. The song is a mournful ballad about a romantic relationship which is falling apart.

The song also appeared the following year on Greatest Hits Volume II, though for copyright reasons it no longer appears on the current version of that album. It now appears on Greatest Hits 1976–1986, The Very Best of Elton John, Greatest Hits 1970–2002 and Diamonds as well as a number of other compilations.

In 2004, John and Ray Charles performed the song on Charles' duet album, Genius Loves Company. It would turn out to be the last recording Charles made before his death that June. The duet was nominated for a Grammy Award for Best Pop Collaboration with Vocals.

== Background and composition ==
"Sorry Seems to Be the Hardest Word" is a mournful ballad about a romantic relationship that is falling apart. Bernie Taupin said: "It's a pretty simple idea, but one that I think everyone can relate to at one point or another in their life. That whole idealistic feeling people get when they want to save something from dying when they basically know deep down inside that it's already dead. It's that heartbreaking, sickening part of love that you wouldn't wish on anyone if you didn't know that it's inevitable that they're going to experience it one day."

Elton John began writing the song in 1975 in Los Angeles. Whilst many of his songs involved Taupin writing lyrics first, then John writing the music later, John wrote the melody and most of the lyrics for "Sorry Seems to Be the Hardest Word", and Taupin completed it afterwards. John explained: "I was sitting there and out it came, 'What have I got to do to make you love me.'" In the singer's 2019 autobiography, he explains that those first lyrics were "the fallout of another disastrous infatuation with a straight guy."

Taupin later said: "I don't think he was intending on writing a song, but we were sitting around an apartment in Los Angeles, and he was playing around on the piano and he came up with this melody line, and I said, 'Hey, that's really nice.' For some reason this lyrical line, 'Sorry seems to be the hardest word' ran through my head, and it fit perfectly with what he was playing. So I said, 'Don't do anything more to that, let me go write something,' so I wrote it out in a few minutes and we had the song." Taupin added: "[The i]nteresting thing about 'Sorry Seems to Be the Hardest Word' is that it's one of the rare occasions when Elton played me a melody line that inspired a lyric, as opposed to our routine of the lyrics always coming first. He was messing around on the piano one day and was playing something and asked me what did I think. It was actually pretty immediate, the title and the first couple of lines came into my head in a way that I guess I felt they were already there and just needed a little prompting."

== Reception ==
The song was a Top 20 hit, reaching No. 11 in the United Kingdom, No. 6 in the United States and No. 3 in Canada. In addition, the song went to No. 1 on the US and Canadian Adult Contemporary charts. In the US, it was certified gold on 25 January 1977 by the Recording Industry Association of America (RIAA).

Billboard praised John's vocal performance, calling it "almost painfully sincere and believable" and also commented on the complexity of the backing vocals. Cash Box called it "a tender love song about breaking up." Record World called it "Elton's most emotional and moving ballad performance since 'Someone Saved My Life Tonight.'"

== Personnel ==
- Elton John – piano, vocals
- Ray Cooper – vibraphone
- Carl Fortina – accordion
- James Newton Howard – electric piano, strings arrangement
- Kenny Passarelli – bass

== Commercial performance ==
=== Charts ===
==== Weekly charts ====
Chart (1976–1977)	Peak position
Australia (Kent Music Report)	11
Belgium (Ultratop 50 Flanders)	25
Canada Top Singles (RPM)	3
Canada Adult Contemporary (RPM)	1
Ireland (IRMA)	3
Netherlands (Dutch Top 40)	14
Netherlands (Single Top 100)	14
New Zealand (Recorded Music NZ)	7
UK Singles (Official Charts)	11
US Billboard Hot 100	6
US Easy Listening (Billboard)	1
US Cash Box Top 100	7

==== Year-end charts ====
Chart (1977)	Rank
Canada Top Singles (RPM)	83
US Billboard Hot 100	95

=== Certifications ===
Region	Certification	Certified units/sales
Canada (Music Canada)	Gold	75,000^{^}
United Kingdom (BPI)	Silver	200,000^{‡}
United States (RIAA)	Gold	1,000,000^{^}
^{^} Shipments figures based on certification alone.^{‡} Sales+streaming figures based on certification alone.

== Blue version ==
"Sorry Seems to Be the Hardest Word"

Single by Blue featuring Elton John

from the album One Love
- B-side: "Lonely This Christmas"; "Album Medley"; "Sweet Thing"
- Released: 9 December 2002
- Genre: R&B
- Length: 3:41 (album version); 3:31 (radio edit)
- Label: Virgin; Innocent
- Composer: Elton John
- Lyricist: Bernie Taupin
- Producer: StarGate

Blue singles chronology
"One Love" (2002)	"Sorry Seems to Be the Hardest Word" (2002)	"U Make Me Wanna" (2003)

Elton John singles chronology
"Your Song" (2002)	"Sorry Seems to Be the Hardest Word" (2002)	"Are You Ready for Love" (2003)

Music video
- Blue featuring Elton John – "Sorry Seems to Be the Hardest Word" on YouTube

"Sorry Seems to Be the Hardest Word" was covered in 2002 by English boy band Blue for their second studio album, One Love (2002). The song was recorded as a collaboration with John and was the second single from the album. It peaked at number one on the UK singles chart on 15 December 2002, giving Blue their third number-one single and John his fifth. It also reached number one in Hungary and the Netherlands, and peaked within the top 10 in an additional 16 countries.

=== Background ===
When Blue's second studio album, One Love, was being put together, executive producer Hugh Goldsmith said that a cover version should be included on the final tracklist. Band member Lee Ryan suggested "Sorry Seems to Be the Hardest Word". Despite reservations from the rest of the group, who were skeptical that John would allow them to record the track, John's management gave permission. John accompanied the band in the recording studio and was originally only going to play the piano, but he later said he was willing to sing as well, and the song became a duet.

=== Track listings ===
UK CD1

1. "Sorry Seems to Be the Hardest Word" (radio edit) – 3:31
2. "Lonely This Christmas" – 2:08
3. "Sorry Seems to Be the Hardest Word" (Ruffin Ready Soul mix) – 3:51
4. Video interactive element – 3:30

UK CD2

1. "Sorry Seems to Be the Hardest Word" (radio edit) – 3:31
2. "Album Medley" – 5:44
3. "Sweet Thing" – 3:38
4. Video interactive element – 3:30

UK cassette single

1. "Sorry Seems to Be the Hardest Word" (radio edit) – 3:31
2. "Album Medley" – 5:44
3. "Sweet Thing" – 3:38

=== Personnel ===
Personnel are taken from the UK CD1 liner notes.

- Elton John – music, featured vocals
- Bernie Taupin – lyrics
- Blue – vocals
- StarGate – production
- Max Dodson – photography

=== Charts ===
==== Weekly charts ====
Chart (2002–2003)	Peak position
Australia (ARIA)	43
Austria (Ö3 Austria Top 40)	4
Belgium (Ultratop 50 Flanders)	3
Belgium (Ultratop 50 Wallonia)	4
Canada (Nielsen SoundScan)	7
Croatia (HRT)	3
Denmark (Tracklisten)	5
Denmark Airplay (Tracklisten)	4
Europe (Eurochart Hot 100)	2
Europe (European Hit Radio)	2
Finland Airplay (Radiosoittolista)	3
France (SNEP)	6
France Airplay (SNEP)	1
Germany (GfK)	3
Greece (IFPI)	3
Hungary (Rádiós Top 40)	1
Hungary (Single Top 40)	6
Ireland (IRMA)	3
Italy (FIMI)	4
Italy (Musica e dischi)	6
Latvia (Latvijas Top 40)	1
Netherlands (Dutch Top 40)	1
Netherlands (Single Top 100)	1
New Zealand (Recorded Music NZ)	5
Norway (VG-lista)	2
Poland Airplay (Polish Airplay Charts)	2
Portugal (AFP)	5
Romania (Romanian Top 100)	5
Scottish Singles Sales (Official Charts)	1
Spain (Promusicae)	7
Spain Airplay (Top 40 Radio)	19
Sweden (Sverigetopplistan)	2
Switzerland (Schweizer Hitparade)	3
UK Singles (Official Charts)	1
UK Airplay (Music Week)	4

==== Year-end charts ====
Chart (2002)	Position
Ireland (IRMA)	38
UK Singles (OCC)	34

Chart (2003)	Position
Austria (Ö3 Austria Top 40)	29
Belgium (Ultratop 50 Flanders)	29
Belgium (Ultratop 50 Wallonia)	10
Europe (Eurochart Hot 100)	6
Europe (European Hit Radio)	7
France (SNEP)	28
France Airplay (SNEP)	30
Germany (Media Control GfK)	24
Ireland (IRMA)	58
Italy (FIMI)	24
Latvia (Latvijas Top 50)	10
Netherlands (Dutch Top 40)	2
Netherlands (Single Top 100)	4
New Zealand (RIANZ)	25
Romania (Romanian Top 100)	11
Sweden (Hitlistan)	20
Switzerland (Schweizer Hitparade)	26
Taiwan (Hito Radio)	43
UK Singles (OCC)	90

==== Decade-end charts ====
Chart (2000–2009)	Position
Netherlands (Single Top 100)	31

=== Certifications ===
Certifications for "Sorry Seems to Be the Hardest Word"
Region	Certification	Certified units/sales
Belgium (BRMA)	Gold	25,000^{*}
France (SNEP)	Gold	250,000^{*}
Netherlands (NVPI)	Gold	40,000^{^}
New Zealand (RMNZ)	Gold	15,000^{‡}
Switzerland (IFPI Switzerland)	Gold	20,000^{^}
United Kingdom (BPI)	Gold	400,000^{‡}
^{*} Sales figures based on certification alone.^{^} Shipments figures based on certification alone.^{‡} Sales+streaming figures based on certification alone.

=== Release history ===
Region	Date	Format(s)	Label(s)	Ref.
United Kingdom	9 December 2002	CD; cassette	Virgin; Innocent	
Belgium	11 December 2002	CD	Virgin	
Australia	5 May 2003	CD	Virgin; Innocent	

== Other versions ==
In 2004, Elton John and Ray Charles performed the song on Charles' duet album, Genius Loves Company. It would turn out to be the last recording Charles made before his death that June. The duet was nominated for a Grammy Award for Best Pop Collaboration with Vocals.

Suzy Bogguss and Chet Atkins recorded the song for the 1994 duet album, Simpatico. It was nominated for Vocal Event of the Year at the 1995 CMA Awards.
