= Crazy Water =

Single by Elton John

from the album Blue Moves
- B-side: "Chameleon"
- Released: 4 February 1977
- Recorded: March 1976
- Genre: Pop rock, disco
- Length: 5:42
- Label: MCA (US); DJM (UK)
- Songwriters: Elton John, Bernie Taupin
- Producer: Gus Dudgeon

Elton John singles chronology
"Bite Your Lip (Get Up and Dance!)" (1977)	"Crazy Water" (1977)	"The Goaldiggers Song" (1977)

"Crazy Water" is a song by British musician Elton John and lyricist Bernie Taupin. It is the seventh track on John's 1976 album Blue Moves. It was released as a single in the UK in February 1977. The single reached No. 27 in the UK singles chart.

"Crazy Water" was sporadically performed by John during his concert tours with percussionist Ray Cooper from 1977 until 2012.

== Personnel ==
- Elton John – piano, vocals
- Paul Buckmaster – conductor
- Cindy Bullens – backing vocals
- Ray Cooper – percussion
- Martyn Ford – strings
- Ron Hicklin – backing vocals
- Bruce Johnston – backing vocals
- Davey Johnstone – electric guitar
- Jon Joyce – backing vocals
- Gene Morford – backing vocals
- James Newton Howard – clavinet
- Kenny Passarelli – bass guitar
- Roger Pope – drums
- Caleb Quaye – electric guitar
- Toni Tennille – backing vocals
