= The Goaldiggers Song =

Single by Elton John
- B-side: "Brian, Jimmy, Elton and Eric"
- Released: April 1977
- Recorded: 1977
- Genre: Charity
- Length: 2:30
- Label: Rocket Records
- Songwriter: Elton John
- Producer: Unlisted

Elton John singles chronology
"Crazy Water" (1977)	"The Goaldiggers Song" (1977)	"Ego" (1978)

"The Goaldiggers Song" is a charity single by British musician Elton John, released in 1977. The song is written for the Goaldigger's charity to provide playing fields in under-privileged areas. The single never charted anywhere, as it was a limited charity release - only 500 copies were pressed, approximately half of which were signed by John.

The song is written, composed and performed solely by John; the song features only his piano and multi-tracked vocals. The actual disc does not contain writing or production credits, and since the release of the single, it hasn't appeared on any album or been reissued in any formats and considered as a collector's item.

The only well-known performance of this song happens at his performance at the Wembley Empire Pool on 3 November 1977.

== Background ==
At the time in 1977, John was living reclused in London; the only time he would go out was to go see his football team Watford F.C. play. The single was available for a cost of five UK pounds by mail-order only and featured John and a number of other British celebrities including Jimmy Hill and Eric Morecambe in conversation on the B-side. The tapes were destroyed after the pressing, so no other official copies of the recording exist.
