= Bite Your Lip (Get Up and Dance!) =

- 12-inch UK retail single

Single by Elton John

from the album Blue Moves
- B-side: "Chameleon" (US); "Chicago" by Kiki Dee (UK)
- Released: 31 January 1977 (US); 3 June 1977 (UK)
- Recorded: March 1976
- Genre: Rock, Pop, Disco
- Length: 3:37 (7" single); 6:39 (Album version)
- Label: MCA (US); DJM (UK)
- Songwriter(s): Elton John, Bernie Taupin
- Producer(s): Gus Dudgeon

Elton John singles chronology
"Sorry Seems to Be the Hardest Word" (1976)	"Bite Your Lip (Get Up and Dance!)" (1977)	"Crazy Water" (1977)

Official audio
- "Bite Your Lip (Get Up And Dance!)" on YouTube (12" single version)

"Bite Your Lip (Get Up and Dance!)" is a song written by British musician Elton John and lyricist Bernie Taupin. It is the closing track of John's 1976 album Blue Moves. It came out as a single two months after the release of the album. The US B-side was another album track, "Chameleon", which was also featured on the "Crazy Water" single that only came out in the UK, only four days later, but the UK release of 'Bite Your Lip' was released as a double-A side single, which was backed with 'Chicago' by Kiki Dee, making the release a joint chart effort. The single peaked at No. 28 in both the U.S. and the UK. 500 copies were sent to radio DJ's on a special 12" edition, by The Rocket Record Company.

== Lyrical meaning ==
The song is a party-song. It mentions various places. There is a choir singing throughout most of the song. It could be put in the same vein as disco, but also uses rock and roll, gospel, and pop elements.

== Musical structure ==
The song opens with John on piano, and then kicks off to the beat, with the song's first of two slide guitar solos by Davey Johnstone along with the heavy percussion rhythms of Ray Cooper. Caleb Quaye also performs as part of the band on the track. The song begins to turn into a jam after about the first two minutes, prominently including a choir of singers chanting "Bite your lip – get up – (get up) – get up and dance – bite your lip – get up – (get up – get up and dance – bite your lip – get up – get up and dance, dance, dance! (Dance, dance...) (Dance, dance, daaaaaance!)". Like the amount of vocals, the amount of instrumentation increases significantly during this portion, but with John on piano, the piano is obviously the dominant instrument; there are three piano solos in the song. As a result of the musical free-for-all, the song is six minutes and forty-three seconds, making it one of John's longest.

== Performances ==
The song closed John's "last" concert in 1977, which featured Stevie Wonder on stage. He also played it dressed as Donald Duck at the free concert in Central Park in 1980. The most recent performance dates from 2004, the first time since his throat surgery. The song was played as part of his tour for Peachtree Road but played in just a handful of concerts and then dropped from the set (a performance was later issued as a B-side of the "Electricity" single).

== Reception ==
Billboard described "Bite Your Lip (Get Up and Dance!)" as an "all -out disco rocker" and praised its "dynamic and cheerful energy." Cash Box said that it "falls somewhere between hard-driving boogie and more conventional disco productions" and that "the grand finale utilizes orchestra and repeated chorus, while the basic rhythm section, especially John at the piano, cooks as if in live performance." Record World said of the single that "Elton's raving disco-styled number...has been edited and given a Tom Moulton mix for maximum danceability."

== Personnel ==
- Elton John – piano, lead vocals
- Davey Johnstone – slide guitar, backing vocals
- Caleb Quaye – rhythm guitar, backing vocals
- Kenny Passarelli – bass
- Roger Pope – drum kit
- James Newton Howard – synthesizers
- Ray Cooper – bongos and congas

With:

- The Cornerstone Institutional Baptist and Southern California Community choirs (5 males and 16 females)
- The Gene Page Strings: five wide cellos, two normal cellos, six violins, and two violas)

Instrument with uncredited players: additional rhythm guitar; bongo and conga set; pair of tambourines; vibraphone; French horn; trumpet; trombone; flute
