= Caesar's Chariot =

Converted passenger jet

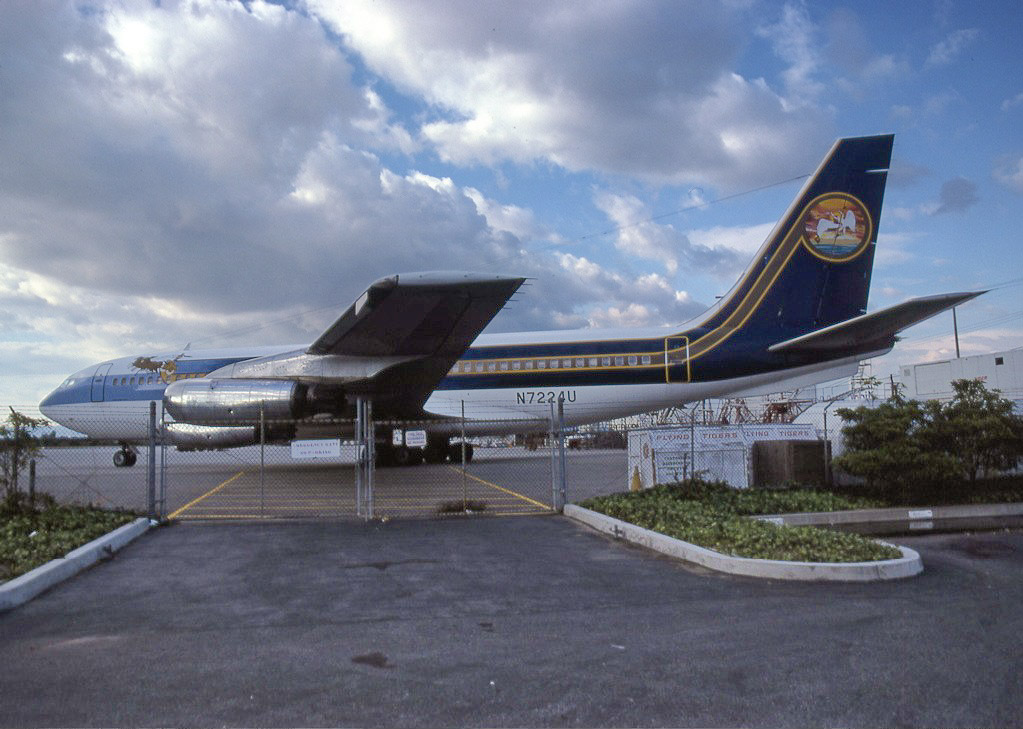
- Caesar's Chariot in 1978, showing Led Zeppelin's Swan Song Records logo on the tailfin

General information
- Type: Boeing 720
- Manufacturer: Boeing
- Owners: United Airlines; Caesars Palace Hotel and Casino; Led Zeppelin
- Construction number: 18077
- Registration: N7224U

History
- Manufactured: December 12, 1961
- First flight: January 16, 1962
- Fate: Dismantled for parts

Caesar's Chariot was a Boeing 720 passenger jet which was chartered by English rock band Led Zeppelin for their 1977 concert tour of North America.

== History ==
The airplane, a shorter version of the 707 with no. N7224U (S/N: 18077), was rolled out from the assembly line on December 12, 1961, and its first flight was on January 16, 1962. It was delivered to United Airlines on April 10. In 1975, the airplane was purchased by Desert Palace Inc. and then by Todd Leasing in March 1975, when it was named Caesar's Chariot.

Caesar's Chariot was hired by Led Zeppelin in 1977 from Caesars Palace Hotel and Casino in Paradise, Nevada. The band required the plane because the plane they had previously used for their 1973 and 1975 North American concert tours, The Starship, was permanently grounded at Long Beach Airport with engine difficulties, and they required a comparable alternative.

Caesar's Chariot had been converted from a regular Boeing 720 into a 45-seat plane. For the 1977 tour, the fuselage of the plane was painted with the 'Led Zeppelin' and 'Swan Song' logos. It was also fitted with huge, overstuffed-chair type seating, and there was a bar and private rooms for each member and a Hammond organ. The fees charged for leasing the plane amounted to $2500 per day.

As they had done on their previous 1973 and 1975 concert tours with The Starship, Led Zeppelin based themselves at major cities such as Chicago and used Caesar's Chariot to shuttle them to and from concerts. Tour manager Richard Cole explained:

It (Led Zeppelin's 1977 tour) wasn’t a lot different to me from the ’75 tour; it was the same process of workin’, you know. We had our 707 jet, and I worked out what cities were in range of Chicago. It was easier to leave at 3 or 4 or 5 in the afternoon and then just go to our plane and fly straight into the city we were performing in. It was specifically because it was much better and more comfortable for us to be based in one city and fly in and out. And leave straight afterwards and go straight back to Chicago.

After Led Zeppelin returned the plane in late 1977, it returned to Caesar's Palace service. The aircraft was used by the Bee Gees in their Spirits Having Flown Tour of 1979. It was hired for a cost of over one million dollars, and was custom painted in a black and red scheme with gold and silver accents.

The United States Air Force bought it in late 1986 and sent it to Davis-Monthan AFB in early 1987 for use in the KC-135 re-engine and spares support program. It was totally disassembled for parts by the end of 1987, but parts may have been obtained by an aircraft maintenance school.

== See also ==
- The Starship
