= Live from the Rainbow Theatre =

Live album by Elton John
- Released: 12 April 2025
- Recorded: 7 May 1977
- Venue: Rainbow Theatre, Finsbury Park, London
- Label: Universal

Elton John chronology
Who Believes in Angels? (2025)	Live from the Rainbow Theatre (2025)

Live from the Rainbow Theatre is a live album by English musician Elton John released on 12 April 2025 as a limited-edition LP for Record Store Day, followed by a wider release on 25 July 2025. It was recorded during a series of performances at the Rainbow Theatre in 1977, accompanied by percussionist Ray Cooper. The live recordings were originally broadcast by BBC Radio 1 and had long circulated on bootleg albums. Concert footage was also televised, but the official release marked the first authorized issue of the recordings.

The album includes 12 of the 25 songs from John's 7 May concert at the Rainbow Theatre in London.

== Track listing ==
All songs written by Elton John and Bernie Taupin except where noted.

Side A

1. "The Greatest Discovery"
2. "Border Song"
3. "Cage the Songbird" (John–Taupin/Davey Johnstone)
4. "Where to Now St. Peter?"
5. "Ticking"
6. "Better Off Dead"

Side B

1. "Sweet Painted Lady"
2. "Tonight"
3. "Idol"
4. "I Feel Like a Bullet (In the Gun of Robert Ford)"
5. "Roy Rogers"
6. "Dan Dare (Pilot of the Future)"
7. "Goodbye" (previously unreleased extended version, available on CD edition and streaming)

== Personnel ==
- Elton John – vocals, piano
- Ray Cooper – percussion

== Charts ==
Chart performance for Live from the Rainbow Theatre
Chart (2025)	Peak position
Swiss Albums (Schweizer Hitparade)	66
