= Grow Some Funk of Your Own =

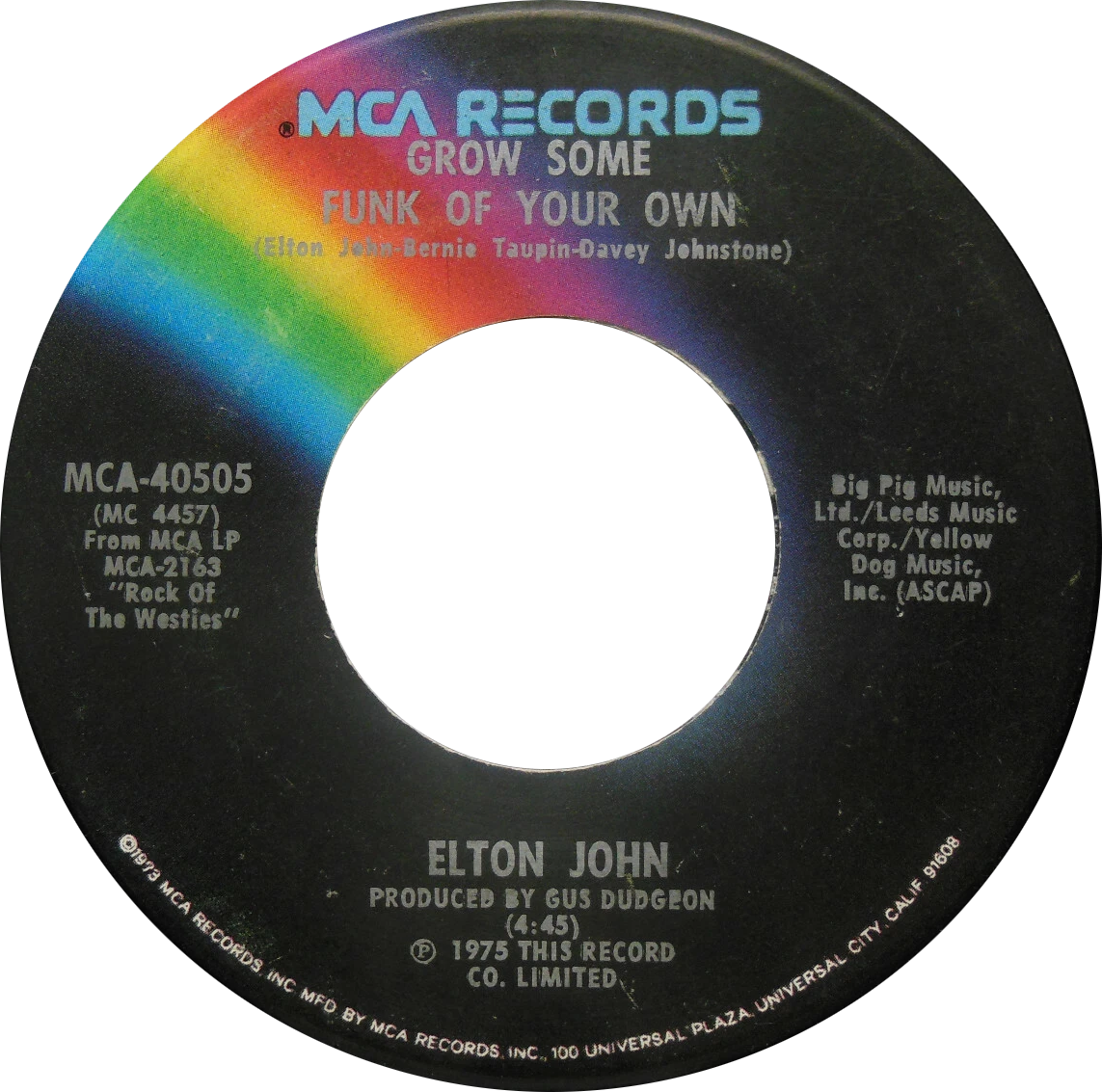
- One of flipside labels of the US single

Single by Elton John

from the album Rock of the Westies
- A-side: "I Feel Like a Bullet (In the Gun of Robert Ford) (double A-side)"
- Released: 12 January 1976
- Recorded: June–July 1975
- Genre: Hard rock; glam rock
- Length: 4:45
- Label: MCA (US); DJM (UK)
- Songwriters: Elton John; Bernie Taupin; Davey Johnstone
- Producer: Gus Dudgeon

Elton John singles chronology
"Island Girl" (1975)	"Grow Some Funk of Your Own" / "I Feel Like a Bullet (In the Gun of Robert Ford)" (1976)	"Pinball Wizard" (1976)

"Grow Some Funk of Your Own" is a song by British musician Elton John. It was released as a single in 1976 from the album Rock of the Westies. It shared its A-side status with "I Feel Like a Bullet (In the Gun of Robert Ford)". The song went to No. 14 on the Billboard Hot 100, but in Britain broke a five-year run of successful singles by failing to reach the top 50 despite extensive radio play. Guitarist Davey Johnstone is credited as a co-writer.

== Synopsis ==
The song centers on a man who wakes up after a bad dream entailing an episode set in Mexico, where the protagonist falls for a young lady in a small town but is dismissed by her boyfriend, telling him to return to where he came from (hence the lyric, "Take my advice/take the next flight/and grow your funk/grow your funk at home").

== Reception ==
Cash Box called it "a hard-driving rocker which has a part audiences will sing along to and maybe provide another encore to his live show" with "an absolutely frantic ending with the vibraphones receiving the beating of their lives." Record World said that "Elton shows why he's on top with his 'English charm' and an enthusiastic no holds barred rock 'n' roll sound."

== Personnel ==
- Ray Cooper – castanets, tambourine, bell tree, vibraphone
- Kiki Dee – backing vocals
- Davey Johnstone – electric guitars, backing vocals
- Elton John – piano, vocals
- Kenny Passarelli – bass, backing vocals
- Roger Pope – drums
- Caleb Quaye – electric guitars, backing vocals

== Chart performance ==
Chart (1976)	Peak position
US Billboard Hot 100	14
