= I Feel Like a Bullet (In the Gun of Robert Ford) =

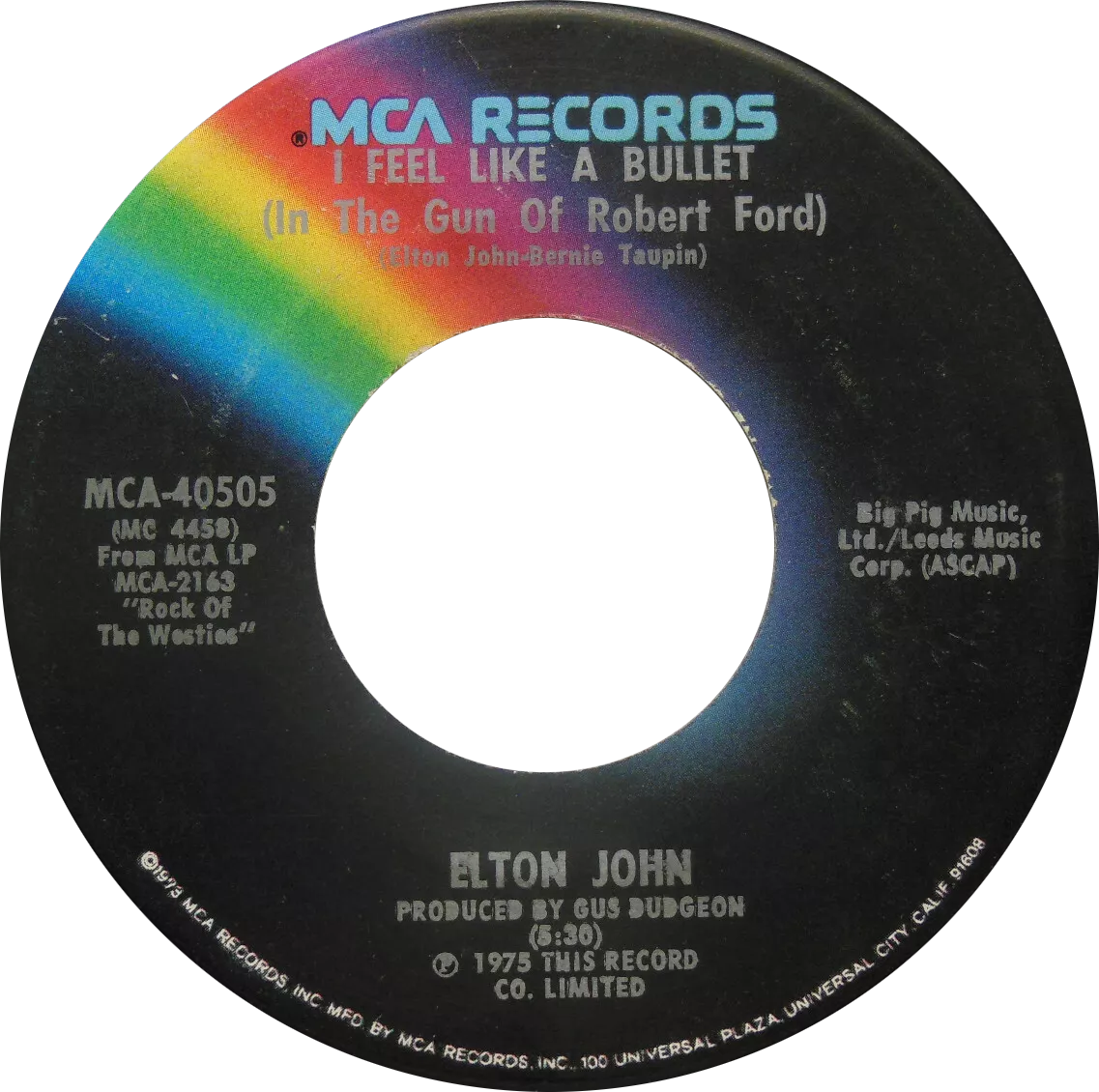
- One of flipside labels of the US single

Single by Elton John

from the album Rock of the Westies
- A-side: "Grow Some Funk of Your Own (double A-side)"
- Released: 12 January 1976
- Recorded: June–July 1975
- Length: 5:28
- Label: MCA (US); DJM (UK)
- Songwriters: Elton John; Bernie Taupin
- Producer: Gus Dudgeon

Elton John singles chronology
"Island Girl" (1975)	"Grow Some Funk of Your Own" / "I Feel Like a Bullet (In the Gun of Robert Ford)" (1976)	"Pinball Wizard" (1976)

"I Feel Like a Bullet (In the Gun of Robert Ford)" is a song by English musician Elton John written by John and Bernie Taupin, released in 1976 as a double A-side single with "Grow Some Funk of Your Own" from his tenth studio album Rock of the Westies (1975). The song reached No. 14 on the U.S. Billboard Hot 100 in February 1976 and No. 21 Easy Listening, but failed to reach the top 50 in the singer's native United Kingdom. It was his least successful single since 1970.

== Background ==
The song's lyrics compare the shooting of Jesse James by James' outlaw-partner Robert Ford to Taupin's failed marriage to his first wife Maxine Feibelman.

Since its release, John rarely played the song at his concerts. A live version, recorded in England in May 1977 with just Elton on piano and Ray Cooper on percussion, was released by MCA Records on the To Be Continued... box set released in 1990 (1991 in the UK).

== Charts ==
Chart (1976)	Peak position
US Billboard Hot 100	14
U.S. Billboard Easy Listening	21
