= We All Fall in Love Sometimes =

Song by Elton John

from the album Captain Fantastic and the Brown Dirt Cowboy
- Released: 1975
- Recorded: August 13, 1974 (basic tracking) / August 18, 1974 (Elton's lead vocals)
- Studio: Caribou Ranch, Nederland, Colorado
- Genre: Soft rock; pop
- Length: 4:15
- Label: MCA (US); DJM (UK)
- Songwriters: Elton John; Bernie Taupin
- Producer: Gus Dudgeon

"We All Fall in Love Sometimes" is the ninth track on Elton John's album Captain Fantastic and the Brown Dirt Cowboy, written by John (music) and Bernie Taupin (lyrics), and released in 1975.

== Song background ==
The song talks about friendships and being in love with them. This song heavily relies on John's piano as the whole band appears at the bridge of it unlike some other songs of his. It was inspired by his 1970 breakthrough hit, "Your Song".

John felt a sincere connection with the lyrics of the song as he told Rolling Stone in 2013 that he was crying while recording this song because he was in love with Bernie, not in a sexual way, but because he was the person that John was looking for his entire life, his little soulmate. "We'd come so far, and we were still very naive", John continued, "He was a person that, more than anything, I loved, and the relationship we had was so odd, because that is the most important relationship of my entire life and it was not tied at the hip", he added.

== Release ==
On the original pressing of the album, this song and another track called "Curtains", are combined into a one track. However, on the later releases of the album, these two tracks were separated.

Aside from being a track on the album, it was released as a single alongside other songs on the album in the Philippines on 1975 and it appeared alongside "Curtains" as B-sides on the 12-inch single of Funeral for a Friend/Love Lies Bleeding in 1978. These releases helps the song to become a radio hit and a fan favourite.

=== Later release ===
It was included on a compilation of rare Elton John songs called Elton: Jewel Box released in 2020.

=== Live performances ===
John performed this song on his tours regularly since its release until 1976. However, starting in 1993, he played it again alongside "Curtains" sporadically on his concert tours until 2005.

== Covers ==
This song was covered by Jeff Buckley on the My Sister's Keeper Soundtrack. It was also covered by Coldplay for the 2018 tribute album Revamp: Reimagining the Songs of Elton John & Bernie Taupin. Norwegian singer Rebekka Bakken covered it on her 2023 album Always on My Mind.

== Personnel ==
- Elton John – piano, harpsichord, Mellotron, vocals
- Dee Murray – bass, backing vocals
- Nigel Olsson – drums, backing vocals
- David Hentschel – Arp synthesizer
- Ray Cooper – tambourine, bells and congas
- Davey Johnstone – electric guitar and acoustic guitar, backing vocals
