= Pinball Wizard =

1969 single by the Who

- Continental European picture sleeve

Single by the Who

from the album Tommy
- B-side: "Dogs Part Two"
- Released: 7 March 1969
- Recorded: 7 February 1969
- Studio: Morgan, London
- Genre: Hard rock; power pop
- Length: 2:57
- Label: Track (UK); Decca (US)
- Songwriter: Pete Townshend
- Producer: Kit Lambert

The Who singles chronology
"Magic Bus" (1968)	"Pinball Wizard" (1969)	"I'm Free" (1969)

Lyric video
- "Pinball Wizard" by the Who on YouTube

Live video
- "Pinball Wizard" (1970, live) by the Who on YouTube

Alternative release
- Side A of the UK single

"Pinball Wizard" is a song by English rock band the Who, written by guitarist and main songwriter Pete Townshend and featured on their 1969 rock opera album Tommy. The original recording was released as a single in 1969 and reached No. 4 in the UK charts and No. 19 on the U.S. Billboard Hot 100.

The B-side of the "Pinball Wizard" single is an instrumental credited to Keith Moon, titled "Dogs Part Two". Despite the title, it has no musical connection to the Who's 1968 UK single "Dogs".

== Story ==
The lyrics are written from the perspective of a pinball champion, called "Local Lad" in the Tommy libretto book, astounded by the skills of the opera's eponymous main character, Tommy Walker: "He ain't got no distractions / Can't hear those buzzers and bells / Don't see no lights a flashin' / Plays by sense of smell / Always gets a replay / Never seen him fall / That deaf dumb and blind kid / Sure plays a mean pinball.", and "I thought I was the Bally table king, but I just handed my pinball crown to him".

Townshend once called it "the most clumsy piece of writing [he'd] ever done". Nevertheless, the song was a commercial success and remains one of the most recognised tunes from the opera. It was a perpetual concert favourite for Who fans due to its pop sound and familiarity.

== Position on the album ==
In late 1968 or early 1969, when the Who played a rough assembly of their new album to critic Nik Cohn, Cohn gave an indifferent reaction to it. Following this, Townshend, as Tommy's principal composer, discussed the album with Cohn and concluded that, to lighten the load of the rock opera's heavy spiritual overtones (Townshend had recently become deeply interested in the teachings of Meher Baba), the title character, a "deaf, dumb, and blind" boy, should also be particularly good at a certain game. Knowing Cohn was a pinball fan, Townshend suggested that Tommy would play pinball, and Cohn immediately declared Tommy to be a masterpiece. The song "Pinball Wizard" was written and recorded almost immediately. The single version was slightly sped up and runs to 2:57, whilst the natural length album version runs to 3:04.

== Reception ==
Cash Box said "Pinball Wizard" was "sensational", stating "Retaining the joyful exaltation of early pop rock, the Who add a proficiency and modernization that clicks with the accuracy of a Beatles-gone-heavy." Billboard described the single as "a solid beat rocker". Record World described it as an "exciting side".

== Live performances ==
This song is one of the band's most famous live songs, being played at almost every Who concert since its debut live performance on 2 May 1969. The live performances rarely deviated from the album arrangement, save for an occasional jam at the end sometimes leading to another song. Bootleg recordings show this song has been known to last as long as eight minutes (at a concert at the Rainbow Theatre in London on 3 February 1981), although live versions lasting that long are extremely rare. Pinball Wizard was also played during the Super Bowl XLIV Halftime Show on 7 February 2010.

== Personnel ==
- Roger Daltrey – lead vocals
- Pete Townshend – backing vocals, co-lead vocals, acoustic guitar, electric guitar
- John Entwistle – bass guitar
- Keith Moon – drums

== Charts and certifications ==
=== Weekly charts ===
Chart (1969)	Peak position
Australia Kent Music Report	45
Canada RPM Top Singles	6
Finland (Suomen Virallinen)	32
France	89
Germany	25
Ireland	14
Netherlands	12
New Zealand (Listener)	8
South Africa (Springbok)	6
Switzerland	15
UK Singles Chart	4
US Billboard Hot 100	19
US Cash Box Top 100	15

=== Year-end charts ===
Chart (1969)	Rank
UK	47

=== Certifications ===
Region	Certification	Certified units/sales
New Zealand (RMNZ)	Platinum	30,000^{‡}
United Kingdom (BPI)	Gold	400,000^{‡}
^{‡} Sales+streaming figures based on certification alone.

== Elton John version ==
"Pinball Wizard"
- Side A of the Philippine single

Single by Elton John

from the album Tommy soundtrack
- B-side: "Harmony"
- Released: 12 March 1976
- Recorded: 19 April 1974
- Studio: Ramport, London
- Genre: Hard rock; glam rock
- Length: 5:14
- Label: DJM (UK); Polydor (Promotional Only) (US)
- Songwriter: Pete Townshend
- Producer: Gus Dudgeon

Elton John singles chronology
"Grow Some Funk of Your Own / I Feel Like a Bullet (In the Gun of Robert Ford)" (1976)	"Pinball Wizard" (1976)	"Don't Go Breaking My Heart" (1976)

Audio
- "Pinball Wizard" by Elton John on YouTube

Live video
- "Pinball Wizard" (live, 1975) by Elton John on YouTube

The song was performed by English musician Elton John in Ken Russell's 1975 film adaptation of Tommy. This version was released in 1975 as a promotional single only in the US, and in 1976 in the UK, where it reached number seven. Since it was not released as a commercial single in the US, it was ineligible to be listed on the Billboard Hot 100 chart, but did make the US Radio & Records airplay chart, where it reached number nine.

John's version uses a piano as the song's centerpiece in place of the acoustic guitar in the original. In the film, John's character, a pinball champion with extraordinarily large shoes, is shown playing his pinball machine via a small piano keyboard. He acknowledges that Tommy is a threat, but initially believes he will not be able to beat him for the championship. As the match progresses, he is soon proven wrong, and concedes defeat when Tommy maxes the score counter. His adaptation also features additional lyrics specially written by Townshend for the movie version, as well as a subtle inclusion of musical phrases from the Who's 1960s hit "I Can't Explain" during the outro. Similarly, the Who's later cover of John's "Saturday Night's Alright for Fighting" included parts of "Take Me to the Pilot". Unlike most of the soundtrack's music, which featured various combinations of the Who and some of the era's best session players, John used his own band and producer Gus Dudgeon for the track. John has performed the song as part of his Las Vegas Red Piano Show, as well as on various tours. To date, it is the only cover of a Who song to reach the top 10.

John performed the song with an extended closing jam during his 1975 tour. This version appears on the 2-CD 30th Anniversary release of Captain Fantastic and the Brown Dirt Cowboy, with the live disc of the June 21, 1975 concert from Wembley Stadium.

John opened his 'Final UK Show' at the Glastonbury Festival in 2023 playing the song.

The song has subsequently been performed by Taron Egerton who portrayed John in the film Rocketman (2019).

=== Personnel ===
- Elton John – lead vocals, piano
- Davey Johnstone – acoustic and electric guitars, backing vocals
- Dee Murray – bass, backing vocals
- Nigel Olsson – drums, backing vocals
- Ray Cooper – tambourine, congas

=== Chart performance ===
In Toronto, "Pinball Wizard" spent two weeks at number one on the CHUM survey. In Chicago, "Pinball Wizard" remained on the WLS Musicradio Survey as an "extra" for five and a half months, from mid-April to late September as an album track in heavy rotation.

Chart (1976)	Peak position
Australia	88
Ireland (IRMA)	13
UK	7
US Radio & Records	9

== Other cover versions ==
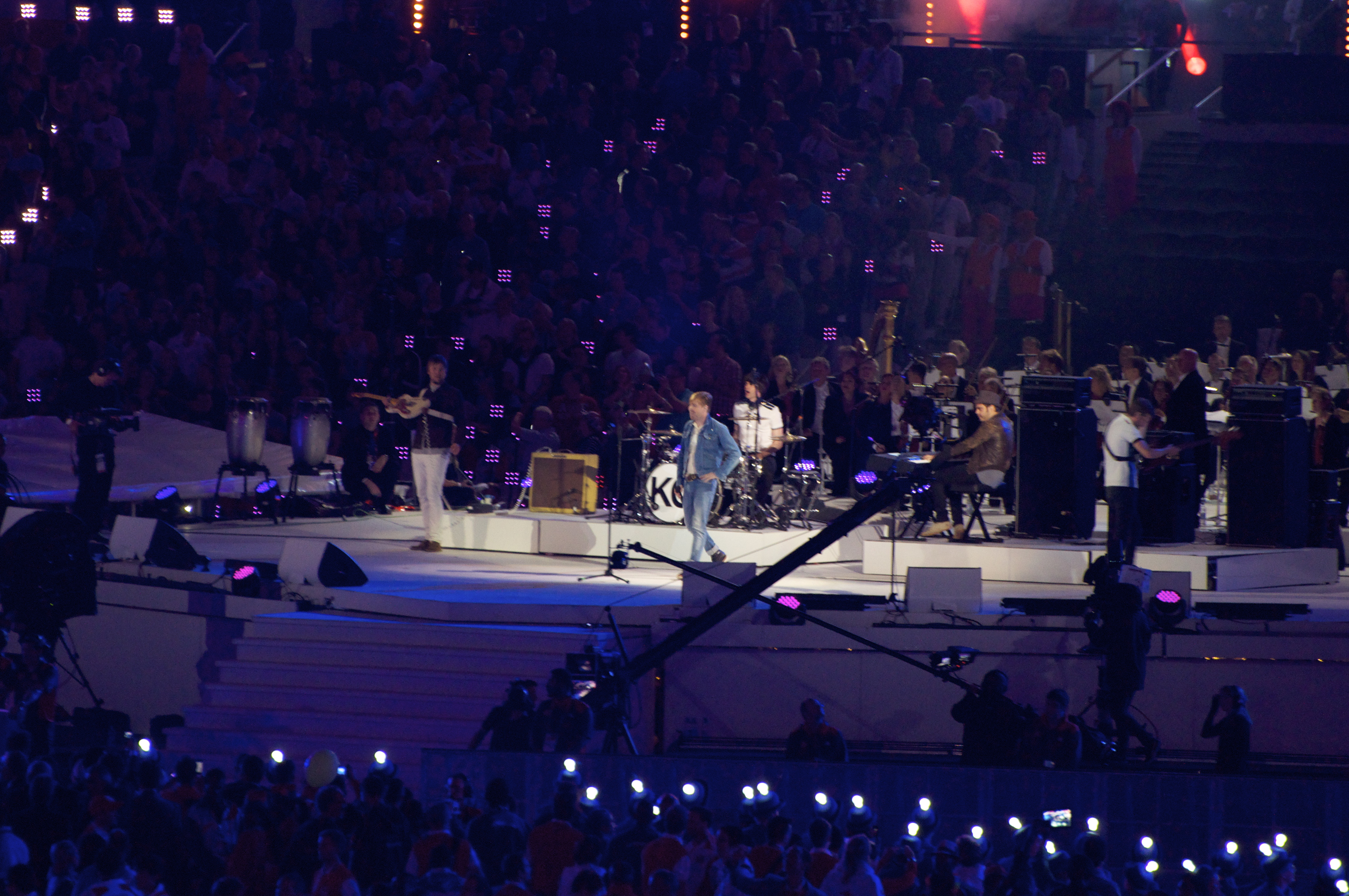
The Kaiser Chiefs performing "Pinball Wizard" at the London Summer Olympics closing ceremony in August 2012

- The song was featured in a medley with another song from Tommy ("See Me, Feel Me") in a recording by the British pop group the New Seekers in 1973. This version reached No.4 on the New Zealand Listener charts, No. 16 on the UK charts and in Australia, No. 28 in Canada, and No. 29 on the U.S. Hot 100.
- In 1977, Barry Williams performed the song during a "Songs from Movies" medley on an episode of The Brady Bunch Variety Hour.
- Tenacious D also regularly perform the song as a part of a medley of songs from Tommy
- British rock band McFly have also covered this song that was used in a promo for Two and a Half Men on Paramount Comedy in 2005.

== Legacy ==
Bruce Springsteen makes a reference to it in his song "4th of July, Asbury Park (Sandy)", in the album The Wild, the Innocent, & the E Street Shuffle, with the lyric "And the wizards play down on Pinball Way". The track is also featured on the video games Rock Band 2, Rock Band Unplugged and Karaoke Revolution: American Idol Encore 2.

Using the phrase "pinball wizard" to describe a high-quality pinball player is common, both in works of media and among the general public. Several pinball tables feature a "wizard mode", a state of play which is only meant to be reached by skilled players. Within the pinball community, the phrase's use is sometimes controversial: this is primarily due to its ubiquity, with many players having become tired of hearing it.

Several pinball machines have been produced with a "Pinball Wizard" theme. Two of these, produced at the time of the Tommy feature film's release, only have an oblique relation to the song: Wizard was completely unlicensed, only taking inspiration from the song and film, while Capt. Fantastic and the Brown Dirt Cowboy, a table ostensibly with an Elton John licence, used the singer's likeness as he appeared in the film, where he played the "Pinball Wizard". Both of these machines were produced in the mid-1970s by Bally Manufacturing. Two decades later, Data East Pinball also produced The Who's Tommy Pinball Wizard, a licensed machine capitalising on the album's stage adaptation.
