= Captain Fantastic and the Brown Dirt Cowboy =

1975 music album by Elton John

Studio album by Elton John
- Released: 23 May 1975
- Recorded: August 8-22, 1974
- Studios: Caribou Ranch, Nederland, Colorado, Marquee Club Studio, London, England (mixing)
- Genres: Rock; pop
- Length: 46:32
- Labels: DJM (UK); MCA (US)
- Producer: Gus Dudgeon

Elton John chronology
Elton John Greatest Hits (1974)	Captain Fantastic and the Brown Dirt Cowboy (1975)	Rock of the Westies (1975)

Singles from Captain Fantastic and the Brown Dirt Cowboy
- 1. "Philadelphia Freedom" Released: 28 February 1975; 2. "Someone Saved My Life Tonight" Released: 20 June 1975

Captain Fantastic and the Brown Dirt Cowboy is the ninth studio album by British musician Elton John, released on 23 May 1975 by DJM Records in the UK and MCA Records in the US. The album is an autobiographical account of the early musical careers of Elton John (Captain Fantastic) and his long-term lyricist Bernie Taupin (the Brown Dirt Cowboy). An instant commercial success, the album was certified gold before its release, and reached No. 1 in its first week of release on the US Billboard 200, the first album to achieve both honours. It sold 1.4 million copies within four days of release, and stayed in the top position in the chart for seven weeks.

Though they would all appear on later albums, this was the last album of the 1970s with the original lineup of the Elton John Band (guitarist Davey Johnstone, bassist Dee Murray, and drummer Nigel Olsson). Until 1983's Too Low for Zero, this was the last album on which Elton John and his classic band played together.

In 2003, the album was ranked number 158 on Rolling Stone's list of The 500 Greatest Albums of All Time, maintaining the rating in a 2012 revised list.

== History ==
Written, according to lyricist Bernie Taupin, in chronological order, Captain Fantastic is a concept album that gives the reader an autobiographical glimpse of the struggles John (Captain Fantastic) and Taupin (the Brown Dirt Cowboy) had in the early years of their musical careers in London (from 1967 to 1969), leading up to John's eventual breakthrough in 1970. The lyrics and accompanying photo booklet are infused with a sense of specific place and time that would otherwise be rare in John's music. John composed the music on a ship voyage from the UK to New York. The 8 track tape was the first to have the songs in the same order as the LP. This resulted in a fade-out/fade-in in the middle of several songs.

"Someone Saved My Life Tonight", the only single released from the album (and a number 4 hit on the US Pop Singles chart), is a semi-autobiographical song based on John's disastrous engagement to Linda Woodrow, and his related 1968 suicide attempt. The "Someone" refers to Long John Baldry, who persuaded him to break off the engagement rather than ruin his music career for an unhappy marriage. It was viewed by Rolling Stone writer Jon Landau as the best track on the album: "As long as Elton John can bring forth one performance per album on the order of 'Someone Saved My Life Tonight', the chance remains that he will become something more than the great entertainer he already is and go on to make a lasting contribution to rock."

In a 2006 interview with Cameron Crowe, John said, "I've always thought that Captain Fantastic was probably my finest album because it wasn't commercial in any way. We did have songs such as 'Someone Saved My Life Tonight,' which is one of the best songs that Bernie and I have ever written together, but whether a song like that could be a single these days, since it's [more than] six minutes long, is questionable. Captain Fantastic was written from start to finish in running order, as a kind of story about coming to terms with failure—or trying desperately not to be one. We lived that story."

John, Taupin and the Elton John Band perhaps laboured longer and harder on the album than they had on any record they had made to that point. In contrast with the fairly rapid and almost factory-like manner of working to which the band was accustomed, in which an album might be recorded in a matter of a few days or at most a couple of weeks (as with Goodbye Yellow Brick Road), in August 1974 the team spent the better part of a month off the road at Caribou Ranch Studios working on the recordings. Producer Gus Dudgeon was apparently also very satisfied with the results. The album's producer was quoted in Elizabeth Rosenthal's His Song, an exhaustive detailed accounting of nearly all John's recorded work, as saying he thought Captain Fantastic was the best the band and John had ever played, lauded their vocal work, and soundly praised John and Taupin's songwriting. "There's not one song on it that falls below incredible," Dudgeon said.

The album contains an "Easter egg" in the form of lyrics to an unperformed song, "Dogs In The Kitchen," which was included in the Lyrics booklet accompanying the album. According to John's official website, in addition to the album tracks and singles, and the lyric for "Dogs in the Kitchen," the following songs were written but not recorded during the sessions: "You Know Me—Jealousy" (for which Elton and Bernie wrote both music and lyrics), and the instrumentals "Golden Boy" and "Passing Phase."

== 50th Anniversary Set ==
Captain Fantastic and the Brown Dirt Cowboy: 50th Anniversary Edition

Box set by Elton John
- Released: 24 October 2025
- Genres: Rock; pop
- Length: 132:45
- Label: EMI/Mercury/UMR
- Producer: Gus Dudgeon

Elton John chronology
Live from the Rainbow Theatre (2025)	Captain Fantastic and the Brown Dirt Cowboy: 50th Anniversary Edition (2025)

=== Content ===
The first disc consists entirely of the 2016 remaster of the album, while the second disc consists of various takes and various live performances of the album's tracks from 2005.

=== Background and release ===
John announced the set on 8 September 2025, and the announcement was quickly picked up and published by magazines and news sites. It was released on 24 October that same year.

== Sequel ==
The 2006 album The Captain & the Kid is the sequel, and continues the autobiography where Captain Fantastic leaves off.

== Cover art ==
The intricate cover art was designed by pop artist Alan Aldridge, illustrated in collaboration with Harry Willock, drawing fantastic imagery from the Early Netherlandish painting The Garden of Earthly Delights by Hieronymus Bosch. The original LP package also included two booklets; a "Lyrics" booklet and another booklet called "Scraps", which collected photos and snippets of reviews, personal diary entries and other memorabilia of John and Taupin during the years that are chronicled on the album. The original LP also contained a poster of the album's cover.

In 1976, Bally released a Capt. Fantastic pinball machine with artwork by Dave Christensen of Elton John as his The Champ character from the movie Tommy. In 1977, Bally released a "home model" version with artwork by Alan Aldridge.

== Release and critical reception ==
Professional ratings
Review scores
Source	Rating
AllMusic	5/5 stars
The Encyclopedia of Popular Music	3/5 stars
Rolling Stone	(favourable)
The Village Voice	B

The album reached number 1 in its first week of release on the US Billboard 200, the first ever album to do so, reportedly selling 1.4 million copies within 4 days of release, and it stayed in that position in the chart for seven weeks. It was certified gold based on pre-release orders in early May 1975, two weeks before it was even officially released, and was certified platinum and triple platinum in March 1993 by the RIAA.

In Canada, it also debuted at number 1 on the RPM national Top Albums chart and only broke a run of what would have been fifteen consecutive weeks at the top by falling one position to number 2 in the ninth week (31 May–6 September). On the UK Albums Chart, it peaked at number 2.

== Reissues ==
A deluxe 30th anniversary edition CD was released September 2005, containing the complete album and adding "House of Cards", the B-side to the 7" single of "Someone Saved My Life Tonight." Recorded during the sessions for Caribou, "House of Cards" previously only appeared on CD on the 1992 Rare Masters collection. Also included is a second disc containing the complete album performed live at Wembley Stadium on 21 June 1975.

In September 2005, Elton John and his band again performed the entire album (minus "Tower of Babel" and "Writing") in a series of sold-out concerts in Boston, New York City and the tour's final stop, Atlanta, in October. These "Captain Fantastic Concerts" were a part of the Peachtree Road Tour and were the longest concerts in Elton's career, many lasting three-and-a-half hours. The songs from Captain Fantastic were aired by Capital Gold Radio in a broadcast taken from 16 September 2005 performance in Boston.

"Curtains", among other songs from the album, was sampled in Pnau's 2012 album Good Morning to the Night.

"We All Fall in Love Sometimes" was covered by Jeff Buckley. It was also covered by Coldplay for the 2018 tribute album Revamp: Reimagining the Songs of Elton John & Bernie Taupin.

A 50th Anniversary edition was released on 24 October 2025, featuring session demos and live recordings.

== Track listing ==
All songs written by Elton John and Bernie Taupin, except where noted.

Side one
No.	Title	Length
1.	"Captain Fantastic and the Brown Dirt Cowboy"	5:46
2.	"Tower of Babel"	4:28
3.	"Bitter Fingers"	4:35
4.	"Tell Me When the Whistle Blows"	4:20
5.	"Someone Saved My Life Tonight"	6:45

Side two
No.	Title	Length
6.	"(Gotta Get a) Meal Ticket"	4:01
7.	"Better Off Dead"	2:37
8.	"Writing"	3:40
9.	"We All Fall in Love Sometimes"	4:15
10.	"Curtains"	6:15
Total length:		46:32

Notes

- The LP version includes three fewer tracks than the CD version, the additional CD tracks being a live version of the title track at track 7, a live version of "Bitter Fingers" a live version of "Tell Me When the Whistle Blows" at track 9.
- On the original DJM Records CD version, "We All Fall in Love Sometimes" and "Curtains" are both combined into one track, making it a nine-track album. On all other CD versions (MCA Records, Polydor and French label Carrere Records), the two tracks are separated.

=== Bonus tracks (1995 Mercury and 1996 Rocket reissue) ===
No.	Title	Writer(s)	Length
11.	"Lucy in the Sky with Diamonds"	John Lennon/Paul McCartney	6:18
12.	"One Day at a Time"	John Lennon	3:49
13.	"Philadelphia Freedom"		5:22
Total length:			62:01

=== 30th anniversary deluxe edition ===
Bonus track
No.	Title	Length
14.	"House of Cards"	3:12
Total length:		65:13

Disc two: Live from "Midsummer Music" at Wembley Stadium, 21 June 1975
No.	Title	Writer(s)	Length
1.	"Captain Fantastic and the Brown Dirt Cowboy"		7:02
2.	"Tower of Babel"		4:38
3.	"Bitter Fingers"		5:06
4.	"Tell Me When the Whistle Blows"		4:39
5.	"Someone Saved My Life Tonight"		7:17
6.	"(Gotta Get a) Meal Ticket"		7:19
7.	"Better Off Dead"		3:01
8.	"Writing"		5:30
9.	"We All Fall in Love Sometimes"		3:57
10.	"Curtains"		8:48
11.	"Pinball Wizard"	Pete Townshend	6:31
12.	"Saturday Night's Alright for Fighting"		7:40
Total length:			71:28

Disc one: 2016 remaster of original album
No.	Title	Length
1.	"Captain Fantastic and the Brown Dirt Cowboy"	5:46
2.	"Tower of Babel"	4:28
3.	"Bitter Fingers"	4:35
4.	"Tell Me When the Whistle Blows"	4:20
5.	"Someone Saved My Life Tonight"	6:45
6.	"(Gotta Get a) Meal Ticket"	4:01
7.	"Better Off Dead"	2:37
8.	"Writing"	3:40
9.	"We All Fall in Love Sometimes"	4:15
10.	"Curtains"	6:15
Total length:		46:32

Disc two: demos and 2005 live performances
No.	Title	Length
1.	"Tell Me When the Whistle Blows" (Session demo)	5:28
2.	"Captain Fantastic and the Brown Dirt Cowboy" (take 1)	3:24
3.	"Writing" (Session demo)	4:02
4.	"We All Fall in Love Sometimes" (Session demo)	7:11
5.	"Captain Fantastic and the Brown Dirt Cowboy" (take 2)	4:22
6.	"Bitter Fingers" (Session demo)	5:23
7.	"Captain Fantastic and the Brown Dirt Cowboy" (Captain Fantastic live, 2005. Featuring voice of Atlanta choir)	6:56
8.	"Bitter Fingers" (Captain Fantastic live, 2005. Featuring voice of Atlanta choir)	5:23
9.	"Tell Me When The Whistle Blows" (Captain Fantastic live, 2005. Featuring voice of Atlanta choir)	4:47
10.	"Someone Saved My Life Tonight" (Captain Fantastic live, 2005. Featuring voice of Atlanta choir)	7:43
11.	"(Gotta Get A) Meal Ticket" (Captain Fantastic live, 2005. Featuring voice of Atlanta choir)	4:12
12.	"Better Off Dead" (Captain Fantastic live, 2005. Featuring voice of Atlanta choir)	3:04
13.	"We All Fall in Love Sometimes / Curtains" (Captain Fantastic live, 2005. Featuring voice of Atlanta choir)	10:20
Total length:		132:45

== Personnel ==
Track numbers refer to CD and digital releases of the album.

=== Musicians ===
- Elton John – lead vocals, acoustic piano (1, 2, 3, 5, 6, 7, 9, 10), Fender Rhodes (1, 4, 5, 8), clavinet (4, 6), ARP String Ensemble (5), harmony vocals (7, 8), harpsichord (9, 10), Mellotron (9, 10)
- David Hentschel – ARP synthesizer (9, 10)
- Davey Johnstone – acoustic guitar (1, 5–10), electric guitar (1–4, 6, 9, 10), mandolin (1), backing vocals (3, 5–10), Leslie guitar (5)
- Dee Murray – bass guitar, backing vocals (3, 5–10)
- Nigel Olsson – drums, backing vocals (3, 5–10)
- Ray Cooper – shaker (1, 5, 8), congas (1, 3, 4, 9, 10), gong (1), jawbone (1), tambourine (1–6, 9, 10), bells (3, 9, 10), cymbals (5), triangle (7, 8), bongos (8)
- Gene Page – orchestral arrangements (4)

Wembley Stadium, 21 June 1975

- Elton John – lead vocals, acoustic piano
- James Newton Howard – keyboards
- Davey Johnstone – electric guitar, backing vocals
- Jeff "Skunk" Baxter – electric guitar, steel guitar
- Caleb Quaye – electric guitar
- Kenny Passarelli – bass guitar
- Roger Pope – drums
- Ray Cooper – percussion
- Donny Gerrard – backing vocals
- Brian Russell – backing vocals
- Brenda Russell – backing vocals

=== Production ===
- Producer – Gus Dudgeon
- Engineer – Jeff Guercio
- Assistant engineer – Mark Guercio
- Remixing – Gus Dudgeon and Phil Dunne
- Remastering – Tony Cousins
- Dolby Atmos & 5.1 Mix - Greg Penny
- Digital transfers – Ricky Graham
- Art direction and graphic conception – David Larkham and Bernie Taupin
- Cover design and illustrations – Alan Aldridge and Harry Willock
- Booklet illustrations – Alan Aldridge and John Hair
- Package design – David Larkham
- Inner sleeve photography – Terry O'Neill
- Booklet photos – Sam Emerson, David Larkham, Anthony Lowe, Michael Ross and Ian Vaughan.
- Liner notes – John Tobler, Paul Gambaccini (Deluxe Edition)

== Accolades ==
Grammy Awards

Year	Nominee / work	Award	Result
1976	Captain Fantastic and the Brown Dirt Cowboy	Album of the Year	Nominated
1976	Captain Fantastic and the Brown Dirt Cowboy	Best Pop Vocal Performance – Male	Nominated

== Charts ==
=== Weekly charts ===
Chart (1975–1976)	Peak position
Australian Albums (Kent Music Report)	1
Austrian Albums (Ö3 Austria)	7
Canada Top Albums/CDs (RPM)	1
Finnish Albums (Suomen virallinen lista)	10
German Albums (Offizielle Top 100)	22
Italian Albums (Musica e Dischi)	12
Japanese Albums (Oricon)	20
New Zealand Albums (RMNZ)	1
Norwegian Albums (VG-lista)	2
Spanish Albums (AFYVE)	3
UK Albums (Official Charts)	2
US Billboard 200	1

Chart (2025)	Peak position
Swiss Albums (Schweizer Hitparade)	78

=== Year-end charts ===
Chart (1975)	Position
Australian Albums (Kent Music Report)	5
Canada Top Albums/CDs (RPM)	1
New Zealand Albums (RMNZ)	16
UK Albums (OCC)	12
US Billboard 200	6

Chart (1976)	Position
Canada Top Albums/CDs (RPM)	99

== Certifications ==
Region	Certification	Certified units/sales
Australia (ARIA)	2× Platinum	100,000^{^}
Canada (Music Canada)	Platinum	100,000^{^}
United Kingdom (BPI)	Gold	100,000^{^}
United Kingdom (BPI) reissue	Silver	60,000^{^}
United States (RIAA)	3× Platinum	3,000,000^{^}
^{^} Shipments figures based on certification alone.
