= Island Girl =

- Sleeve for UK single

Single by Elton John

from the album Rock of the Westies
- B-side: "Sugar on the Floor"
- Released: 29 September 1975
- Recorded: June–July 1975
- Genre: Reggae; funk
- Length: 3:42
- Label: MCA (US); DJM (UK)
- Songwriters: Elton John; Bernie Taupin
- Producer: Gus Dudgeon

Elton John singles chronology
"Someone Saved My Life Tonight" (1975)	"Island Girl" (1975)	"Grow Some Funk of Your Own" / "I Feel Like a Bullet (In the Gun of Robert Ford)" (1976)

Official audio
- "Island Girl" on YouTube

"Island Girl" is a 1975 song by British musician Elton John and lyricist Bernie Taupin, and performed by John. It was released as the first single from the album Rock of the Westies (1975). It reached number one for three weeks on the Billboard Hot 100 in the U.S. (John's final No. 1 single as a solo artist for 22 years), selling over one million copies. It also reached the top five in Canada and New Zealand, as well as the top twenty in Australia and the UK.

John has not performed the song since 1990. While no official reason has been given, Andy Greene of Rolling Stone surmises it is due in part to controversial lyrics about a Jamaican prostitute in New York City and a Jamaican man who wants to take her back to Jamaica.

== Background ==
The single's B-side was "Sugar on the Floor", written by Kiki Dee, who would go on to duet with John on a number of occasions, most notably on their chart-topping 1976 single, "Don't Go Breaking My Heart".

== Personnel ==
- Ray Cooper – congas, tambourine, marimba
- Kiki Dee – backing vocals
- James Newton Howard – ARP synthesizer, Mellotron solo
- Davey Johnstone – Ovation guitar, slide electric guitars, banjo, backing vocals
- Elton John – piano, lead vocal, backing vocals (credited as "Ann Orson")
- Kenny Passarelli – bass, backing vocals
- Roger Pope – drums
- Caleb Quaye – acoustic guitar, backing vocals

== Release ==
The song entered the Billboard Hot 100 on 11 October 1975 at number 49, and reached the top in four weeks.

The week of 4 October 1975, the week before the "Island Girl" entered the charts, marked the first week in over two years in which Elton John did not have a single on the Billboard Hot 100. Billboard's "Inside Track" column reported it as follows: "This week is the first time since August 1973 that Elton John hasn't had a single on the Billboard Hot 100. If Rocket had shipped the upcoming 'Island Girl' a few days earlier, Elton would still be in the running to beat Pat Boone's all-time record of just over four years on the charts."

The song which "Island Girl" replaced at number one was "Bad Blood", by Neil Sedaka. Elton had provided uncredited backing and duetting vocals on this collaboration.

Upon the single release, Record World said "Tropically splendid Elton and Bernie entering the RW charts at 42 this week...need we say more?"

== Charts ==
=== Weekly charts ===
Chart (1975–1976)	Peak position
Australia (Kent Music Report)	12
Canada Top Singles (RPM)	4
New Zealand (Official New Zealand Music Chart)	4
UK Singles (Official Charts)	14
US Billboard Hot 100	1
US Adult Contemporary (Billboard)	27
US Cash Box Top 100	1

=== Year-end charts ===
Chart (1975)	Rank
Brazil	17
Canada (RPM)	38
US Cash Box Top 100	10

Chart (1976)	Rank
Canada (RPM)	143
US Billboard Hot 100	65

== Certifications ==
Region	Certification	Certified units/sales
Canada (Music Canada)	Gold	75,000^{^}
United States (RIAA)	Platinum	1,000,000^{^}
^{^} Shipments figures based on certification alone.
