= Rock of the Westies =

Studio album by Elton John
- Released: 24 October 1975
- Studios: Caribou Ranch (Nederland); Trident (London, UK) (mixing)
- Genre: Rock
- Length: 43:39
- Labels: DJM (UK); MCA (US)
- Producer: Gus Dudgeon

Elton John chronology
Captain Fantastic and the Brown Dirt Cowboy (1975)	Rock of the Westies (1975)	Here and There (1976)

Singles from Rock of the Westies
- 1. "Island Girl" Released: 29 September 1975; 2. "Grow Some Funk of Your Own" / "I Feel Like a Bullet (In the Gun of Robert Ford)" Released: 12 January 1976

Rock of the Westies is the tenth studio album by British musician Elton John. It was released on 24 October 1975, through DJM Records in the UK and MCA Records in the US. Produced by Gus Dudgeon, the record was recorded in mid-1975 at Caribou Ranch in Nederland, Colorado, and contained a new lineup of the Elton John Band.

Released less than five months after Captain Fantastic and the Brown Dirt Cowboy, Rock of the Westies repeated that album's then-unprecedented feat of entering the US Billboard 200 chart at number one. It was also successful in the UK, where it reached number 5. The album's lead single, "Island Girl", topped the Billboard Hot 100 and reached the top 20 in multiple other territories. However, sales of the album tapered quickly, and both contemporary and retrospective reviews have been mixed.

In October 2026, John announced a 50th anniversary edition of the album, containing an alternate vocal and piano mix of the songs, set to be released on 20 November.

== Background ==
For the recording of Rock of the Westies, John dismissed drummer Nigel Olsson and bassist Dee Murray from his band, reportedly desiring a change in sound from his previous album, Captain Fantastic and the Brown Dirt Cowboy. Guitarist Davey Johnstone and percussionist Ray Cooper remained from the previous lineup, with the addition of drummer Roger Pope (a session musician on Empty Sky) and bassist Kenny Passarelli. John also added his friend and extensive prior collaborator Caleb Quaye as a second guitarist and James Newton Howard on synthesizers. The album was produced by Gus Dudgeon.

The title is a play on the phrase "West of the Rockies", a nod to the Caribou Ranch studio in Nederland, Colorado. Upon its release, Rock of the Westies became the second consecutive Elton John album to debut at the top of the Billboard 200, following Captain Fantastic (the first ever album to debut at #1). It was the last in a string of six straight US #1 studio albums, starting in 1972 with Honky Chateau. Amongst other guests, funk-rock group Labelle and pop singer Kiki Dee provide backing vocals.

== Critical reception ==
Professional ratings
Review scores
Source	Rating
AllMusic	3.5/5 stars
Christgau's Record Guide	A−
The Encyclopedia of Popular Music	4/5 stars

In a review for Rolling Stone, Stephen Holden stated the songs "barely accomplish their objective of providing the latest in synthetic boogie", while opining that the new lineup resulted in only "superficial" changes to John's sound. Holden also criticized the lyrics of "Island Girl" as being both sexist and racist, while declaring "Feed Me" to be the album's only lyrics to be "more than a glib, slapdash effort".

Conversely, Robert Christgau praised the album, finding it to have Taupin's best lyrics, while stating that the arrangements of "Island Girl" and "Grow Some Funk of Your Own" "elaborate the songs' racial ironies" and praising the band's "fiery temper" on "Street Kids" and "Hard Luck Story".

== Track listing ==
All tracks are written by Elton John and Bernie Taupin, except where noted. "Ann Orson/Carte Blanche" is a pseudonym used by John and Taupin.

Side one
No.	Title	Writer(s)	Length
1.	"Medley (Yell Help – Wednesday Night – Ugly)"	John; Taupin; Davey Johnstone	6:15
2.	"Dan Dare (Pilot of the Future)"		3:29
3.	"Island Girl"		3:42
4.	"Grow Some Funk of Your Own"	John; Taupin; Johnstone	4:47
5.	"I Feel Like a Bullet (in the Gun of Robert Ford)"		5:27

Side two
No.	Title	Writer(s)	Length
1.	"Street Kids"		6:25
2.	"Hard Luck Story"	Ann Orson/Carte Blanche	5:16
3.	"Feed Me"		4:00
4.	"Billy Bones and the White Bird"		4:25
Total length:			43:39

Bonus tracks (1995 Mercury reissue)
No.	Title	Writer(s)	Length
10.	"Don't Go Breaking My Heart" (featuring Kiki Dee)	Ann Orson/Carte Blanche	4:30
Total length:			49:00

Bonus tracks (1996 Rocket reissue)
No.	Title	Writer(s)	Length
10.	"Planes"		4:31
11.	"Sugar on the Floor"	Kiki Dee	4:31
Total length:			52:41

== Personnel ==
Track numbers refer to CD and digital releases of the album.

=== Musicians ===
- Elton John – lead vocals, acoustic piano (all except 8), backing vocals (1, 2, 3, 6, 8, 9; as Ann Orson)
- James Newton Howard – harpsichord (1), Elka Rhapsody string synthesizer (1), ARP synthesizer (1, 3), Hohner clavinet (1, 2), mellotron (3), electric piano (4, 5, 7, 8, 9), synthesizers (4, 5, 9)
- Davey Johnstone – electric guitar (1, 3, 4, 5, 7, 8, 9), backing vocals (2, 3, 4, 6, 8), rhythm guitar (2, 6), voice bag (2), Ovation guitar (3), banjo (3), slide guitar (3, 6), acoustic guitar (4, 5), guitar solo (5)
- Caleb Quaye – electric guitar (1, 2, 4, 5, 7, 8, 9), backing vocals (2, 3, 4, 6, 7, 8), acoustic guitar (3, 4, 5), rhythm guitar (6), lead guitar solo (6)
- Kenny Passarelli – bass guitar, backing vocals (2, 3, 4, 6, 7)
- Roger Pope – drums (1–5, 7–9)
- Ray Cooper – tambourine (1, 3, 5, 6, 9), cowbell (1, 9), congas (1, 3, 6, 7, 8), jawbone (1), marimba (3), castanets (4), bell tree (4), vibraphone (4, 5, 8), shaker (8), wind chimes (8), maracas (9), kettle drums (9)
- Labelle – backing vocals (1)
- Kiki Dee – backing vocals (2, 3, 4, 6–9)
- Clive Franks – backing vocals (8)

=== Production ===
- Gus Dudgeon – producer
- Jeff Guercio – engineer
- Mark Guercio – assistant engineer
- Gus Dudgeon, Phil Dunne, Nick Bradford - mixing
- Arun Chakraverty – mastering
- John Tobler – liner notes
- Terry O'Neill – album cover photograph
- David Larkham – art direction and design

== Charts ==
=== Weekly charts ===
Chart (1975–1976)	Peak position
Australian Albums (Kent Music Report)	4
Canada Top Albums/CDs (RPM)	1
Danish Albums (Hitlisten)	3
Finnish Albums (The Official Finnish Charts)	25
German Albums (Offizielle Top 100)	33
Italian Albums (Musica e Dischi)	16
Japanese Albums (Oricon)	47
New Zealand Albums (RMNZ)	4
Norwegian Albums (VG-lista)	6
Spanish Albums (AFYVE)	8
Swedish Albums (Sverigetopplistan)	6
UK Albums (Official Charts)	5
US Billboard 200	1

=== Year-end charts ===
Chart (1975)	Position
Australian Albums (Kent Music Report	37
Canada Top Albums/CDs (RPM)	11

Chart (1976)	Position
Australian Albums (Kent Music Report	52
Canada Top Albums/CDs (RPM)	31
US Billboard Year-End	37

== Certifications ==
Region	Certification	Certified units/sales
Australia (ARIA)	Platinum	50,000^{^}
Canada (Music Canada)	Platinum	100,000^{^}
New Zealand (RMNZ)	Gold	7,500^{‡}
United Kingdom (BPI)	Gold	100,000^{^}
United States (RIAA)	Platinum	1,000,000^{^}
^{^} Shipments figures based on certification alone.^{‡} Sales+streaming figures based on certification alone.
