= Someone Saved My Life Tonight =

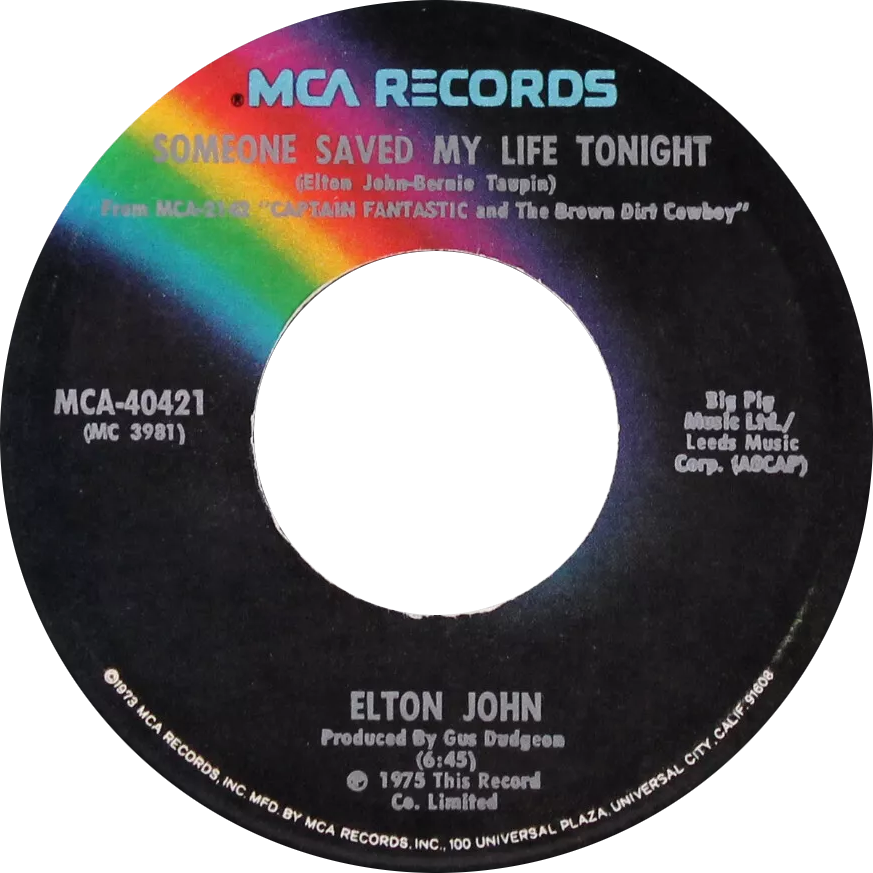
- A-side label of US single

Single by Elton John

from the album Captain Fantastic and the Brown Dirt Cowboy
- B-side: "House of Cards"
- Released: 20 June 1975
- Recorded: 11 August 1974 (basic tracking) / 22 August 1974 (Elton's lead vocals)
- Genre: Soft rock
- Length: 6:45
- Label: MCA; DJM
- Songwriters: Elton John; Bernie Taupin
- Producer: Gus Dudgeon

Elton John singles chronology
"Philadelphia Freedom" (1975)	"Someone Saved My Life Tonight" (1975)	"Island Girl" (1975)

Licensed audio
- "Someone Saved My Life Tonight" on YouTube

"Someone Saved My Life Tonight" is a song with music by British musician Elton John and lyrics by Bernie Taupin, from John's 1975 album Captain Fantastic and the Brown Dirt Cowboy. It was released as a single on 20 June 1975, the only single released from the album. Like the rest of the album, the song is autobiographical, and addresses an attempted suicide by John.

At 6 minutes and 45 seconds, "Someone Saved My Life Tonight" was twice as long as a typical single, but owing to the highly personal nature of the lyrics, John refused to let it be edited down to a more suitable length for radio airplay. Despite the length, the song peaked on the US Billboard Hot 100 chart at No. 4 and in Canada on the RPM Top Singles chart at No. 2. It would be John's last single for eight years to feature the original Elton John Band of John, Dee Murray, Davey Johnstone, and Nigel Olsson, as John fired Murray and Olsson following the recording of the album.

== Background ==
The song concludes side one of the album's narrative, chronicling the early history of John and lyricist, Bernie Taupin, and their struggles to find their place within the music industry.

Taupin's lyric refers to a time in 1968, before John was popular as a musician, when John was engaged to be married to girlfriend Linda Woodrow. John and Woodrow were sharing a flat with Taupin in Furlong Road in Highbury, London, hence the opening line "When I think of those East End lights." John did not love his girlfriend, and felt trapped by the relationship. Feeling desperate, John contemplated suicide, and even made a half-hearted attempt at asphyxiating himself with a gas oven in his home. He took refuge in his friends, especially Long John Baldry, who convinced John to abandon his plans to marry, in order to salvage and maintain his musical career. His parents arrived the next day, in a van, to take him home. As a sign of respect and gratitude to Baldry, Taupin wrote him into the song as the "someone" in the title, and also as "Sugar Bear".

According to Taupin, John had turned on the gas oven, but left the windows open, rendering the attempt ineffective.

The lyric "And butterflies are free to fly" is a reference to a famous quote from Dickens' Bleak House: "I only ask to be free. The butterflies are free. Mankind will surely not deny to Harold Skimpole what it concedes to the butterflies." A few years prior to the song's release, the same quotation had inspired the title of the 1972 American comedy-drama film Butterflies Are Free, an adaptation of the 1969 play of the same title by Leonard Gershe.

== Recording ==
In the liner notes to the Deluxe Edition of Captain Fantastic and The Brown Dirt Cowboy, writer Paul Gambaccini related a recollection from producer Gus Dudgeon. During the recording of the song's lead vocal, Dudgeon said he was pushing John for more in terms of his delivery of the vocal, not paying attention to the lyric. According to Gambaccini, guitarist Davey Johnstone leaned over and told Dudgeon, "You know he's singing about killing himself." Dudgeon was apparently mortified by the revelation and relented.

== Release ==
At 6:45 this was one of John's longest singles, and while it was common practice for record companies to edit songs to a shorter version for radio airplay, his labels MCA and DJM allowed the single to be released uncut.

== Reception ==
When released as the album's only single in 1975, it reached No. 4 on The US Billboard Hot 100 singles chart, and entered the top 25 on the UK Singles Chart. In the U.S., it was certified Gold on 10 September 1975 by the RIAA. In Canada, the single narrowly missed being his ninth number one, hitting No. 2 on the RPM 100 national Top Singles chart on 30 August.

Cash Box said that "Tschaikovsky would feel proud about Elton's punctuated chords — those high harmonies are perfect for summertime." Record World said that it's "the most ambitious cut" from the album and that the "performance advances the level of elegance that made his 'Your Song' ours." Jason Scott of American Songwriter called it an "emotional ballad".

== Live performances ==
John has played the song live many times from its release until 1986, and again from 1995 to present. Perhaps the best known recorded performance was during the Central Park concert on September 13, 1980, which was later broadcast on HBO, and was issued on home video in February 1981.

== Chart performance ==
=== Weekly singles charts ===
Chart (1975)	Peak position
Australia	54
Canada RPM Top Singles	2
Canada RPM Adult Contemporary	24
New Zealand (RIANZ)	13
UK Singles (Official Charts)	22
U.S. Billboard Hot 100	4
U.S. Billboard Hot Adult Contemporary Tracks	36
U.S. Cash Box Top 100	1

=== Year-end charts ===
Chart (1975)	Rank
Canada	31
New Zealand	27
U.S. Billboard Hot 100	91
U.S. Cash Box	50

== Certifications ==
Region	Certification	Certified units/sales
United States (RIAA)	Gold	1,000,000^{^}
^{^} Shipments figures based on certification alone.

== Personnel ==
- Elton John – acoustic piano, Fender Rhodes piano, ARP String Ensemble synthesizer, vocals
- Davey Johnstone – Leslied electric guitar, acoustic guitar, backing vocals
- Dee Murray – bass guitar, backing vocals
- Nigel Olsson – drums, backing vocals
- Ray Cooper – tambourine, shaker, cymbal

== Covers and samples ==
- Walter Jackson recorded a version of the song for his 1976 album Feeling Good.
- Mariah Carey used an interpolation of the song in a house record she co-wrote with David Morales titled "Fly Away (Butterfly Reprise)" which appears on her album Butterfly.
- Sheryl Crow alludes to the lyrics of the song in "Always on Your Side" (a song on her 2005 album Wildflower) with the lyric "If butterflies are free to fly, why do they fly away?"
- Kanye West sampled the song for "Good Morning", a song on his 2007 album Graduation.
- Yeat sampled the song for "Lose Control", a song on his 2026 album A Dangerous Lyfe.
- The film Hamlet 2, starring Steve Coogan, featured a cover of the song sung by an all men's gay choir as part of the performance of the play Hamlet 2.
