= Ponies (TV series) =

American spy thriller television series

- Genre: Spy thriller
- Created by: Susanna Fogel; David Iserson
- Showrunner: David Iserson
- Directed by: Susanna Fogel; Viet Nguyen; Ally Pankiw
- Starring: Emilia Clarke; Haley Lu Richardson; Petro Ninovskyi; Artjom Gilz; Adrian Lester; Nicholas Podany; Vic Michaelis
- Music by: Jung Jae-il; Christopher Willis
- Country of origin: United States
- Original languages: English; Russian; Ukrainian
- No. of seasons: 1
- No. of episodes: 8

Production
- Executive producers: David Iserson; Susanna Fogel; Emilia Clarke; Mike Daniels; Alison Mo Massey; Jessica Rhoades
- Producers: Jonathan Talbert; Adam Goodman; Howard Ellis; Gergö Balika
- Cinematography: Anna Patarakina; Callan Green
- Editors: Debra Shibuyama Simone; Tuan Quoc Le; Jacob Craycroft; Craig D.Tollis
- Running time: 47–53 minutes
- Production companies: Exaggerated Pictures; Big Adventure; 6107 Productions; Magical Thinking Pictures; Pacesetter Productions; Universal Television

Original release
- Network: Peacock
- Release: January 15, 2026

Ponies is an American spy thriller television series created by Susanna Fogel and David Iserson for Peacock, and starring Emilia Clarke, Haley Lu Richardson, Petro Ninovskyi, and Artjom Gilz. The series premiered on January 15, 2026, and received positive reviews from critics. In June 2026, the series was canceled after one season.

== Premise ==
In 1977, two secretaries Bea (Emilia Clarke) and Twila (Haley Lu Richardson) working at the United States embassy in Moscow become CIA operatives after their spy husbands die under mysterious circumstances.

== Cast and characters ==
=== Main ===
- Emilia Clarke as Beatrice "Bea" Grant
- Haley Lu Richardson as Twila Hasbeck
- Petro Ninovskyi as Sasha Shevchenko
- Artjom Gilz as Andrei Vasiliev
- Adrian Lester as Dane Walter
- Nicholas Podany as Ray Szymanski
- Vic Michaelis as Cheryl Szymanski

=== Recurring ===
- Harriet Walter as Manya Caplan
- Louis Boyer as Chris Grant
- John Macmillan as Tom Hasbeck
- Lili Walters as Ivanna
- Andrew Richardson as Shep
- Paul Chahidi as Alan Salek
- Maxim Gall as Trent
- Tanya Ivanova as Vera
- Pál Mácsai as Emile
- Tom Stourton as George Tallman
- Ana Neborac as Tatiana
- Sophia Shkliaruk as Galyna
- Clare Hughes as Eevi
- Diana Gardner as Aksana
- Nikita Kukushkin as Yuri

=== Guest ===
- Patrick Fabian as George H. W. Bush
- Eddie Toll as Mikhail
- Rob Delaney as Stanley (Note: In Ponies, Stanley is stated as being the Director of Central Intelligence who succeeds George H. W. Bush; in reality, this was Stansfield Turner.)
- Simon Haines as Sgt. Davis Carter
- Filipp Avdeev as Lev
- Sofia Kyrychenko as Katya
- Ivan Doan as Nikolai
- Natascha Bondar as Sofia
- Elisabeth Snegir as Young Sofia
- Robert Jackson as Malcolm Toon
- Alistair Mumford as Elton John (Note: In Ponies, Elton John's 1979 tour of the Soviet Union is depicted as happening in 1977.)

== Episodes ==
No.	Title	Directed by	Written by	Original release date
1	"Second Hand News"	Susanna Fogel	Susanna Fogel & David Iserson	January 15, 2026
Bea and Twila are two married women living in Moscow with their respective CIA agent husbands, Chris and Tom. After their husbands are killed during a mission, Bea and Twila return to the United States. To learn more details about their husbands' deaths, they contact the Moscow station chief, Dane, and offer to work as CIA agents. Dane is unsure, but feels like they may serve a purpose, as the KGB would not suspect that women employees at the embassy were undercover agents. They return to Moscow, and begin their official work as secretaries. Dane sets up a meeting where they will hand off material to a potential source, codenamed C.K. Solar. Bea, posing as a Russian schoolteacher, meets with him, but they are interrupted by Vasiliev, a KGB agent.
2	"Hanging on the Telephone"	Susanna Fogel	Susanna Fogel & David Iserson	January 15, 2026
Twila rescues Bea from Vasiliev by setting the bar on fire. The two women escape back to the embassy, where Dane proposes that they need formal training in spycraft. Vasiliev confronts C.K. Solar, who is named Sasha, but believes his story that he was on a date. C.K. Solar opens the package from Bea, and finds a camera for him to photograph electronic schematics. He completes his assignment, but the camera had a light leak, rendering the photos unusable. Bea, under training from another spy, Emile, breaks into Sasha's apartment, and narrowly avoids him catching her as she escapes. Bea gives Sasha another camera and returns home. Vasiliev, believing Bea is a Russian woman, calls her on a phone in her apartment that is listed as belonging to her cover identity. One of Shep's friends from college, George, visits, and ends his trip having sex with a prostitute. She meets Vasiliev after, and he murders her.
3	"Backstreets"	Viet Nguyen	Susanna Fogel & David Iserson	January 15, 2026
At the urging of Dane, Bea prepares to go on a date with Vasiliev. She is nervous, and is coached by Twila on how to make Vasiliev interested without having sex with him. George calls Twila to tell her that the woman he had sex with has been found dead; Twila begins researching further and discovers a large number of prostitutes that have been similarly murdered, and arranges to meet with an employee at a brothel with the help of Ivanna, a local merchant. Ivanna's price for her aid is that Twila meet her for a drink. Bea goes on a date with Vasiliev; she takes him back to Sasha's apartment, as she cannot take him back to her home at the embassy. She convinces Sasha to sneak out, and bring Vasiliev inside. Outside, Sasha encounters Twila, who has stood up Ivanna so that she could provide backup for Bea. Twila and Sasha plant a listening device in Vasiliev's car. In a flashback, one of the women reported murdered is noted by Tom; Emile hides the murder weapon.
4	"Don't Go Breaking My Heart"	Viet Nguyen	Susanna Fogel & David Iserson	January 15, 2026
Twila and Bea are approached by Vera, a Russian woman and one of Dane's contacts. She tells that she wants to set up a meeting with Caterpillar, the code-name for a high-ranking KGB agent who has valuable information to pass to the CIA. She requests money and a passport to allow her to escape the Soviet Union. Bea forges artwork to get the money for Vera, and Twila meets her demands and sets up a meeting with Caterpillar. Vera tells Twila that she was with Chris and Tom in the plane when they were killed, and that Tom had been a double-agent and was passing information to the KGB. Twila confronts Vera, who backs up and falls off the bridge where they are meeting and drowns. Twila argues that Caterpillar doesn't know what Vera looks like, and Bea suggests having her grandmother, Manya, pose as Vera for the meeting. Ray's son discovers a listening device hidden in a fireplace.
5	"Turn the Beat Around"	Susanna Fogel	Susanna Fogel & David Iserson	January 15, 2026
Manya, posing as Vera, prepares for her meeting with Caterpillar. Bea accompanies Vasiliev to a poker game, where she meets Aksana, who previously dated Vasiliev and tells Bea that she has a dacha outside of Moscow if she ever needs to escape. Twila accompanies Manya to her meeting, and witnesses Manya getting abducted by the KGB. Vasiliev leaves the game with Bea to go interrogate Manya. Bea witnesses the interrogation and runs to Vasiliev's car to report her location to the bug; Dane, Twila, and Ray arrive as Manya is being transported to Lefortovo Prison. They rescue her from the prisoner vehicle, where she is riding with Caterpillar. He gives Manya a tape and tries to escape, but falls out of the car and is recaptured by the KGB. At home, Bea finds a tape labeled "Good Year," and finds a tape of Chris having sex with Sasha's sister, who had also been murdered.
6	"Night Moves"	Ally Pankiw	Rosa Handelman	January 15, 2026
Bea, distraught, shows the tape of Chris' infidelity to Dane, who insists it was all part of an operation. Attempting to reassure Bea, Twila confesses that Vera claimed Tom was a double agent and responsible for their husbands' deaths, but this only drives them further apart. Twila enlists Ivanna for aid, and both pose as prostitutes to try and gain information on the whereabouts of a Soviet facility containing kompromat. During the operation, Twila and Ivanna have sex. Ray, working alongside Twila, replaces one of the kompromat tapes in his room with a tape that contains a tracking device. Bea smokes marijuana with Sasha, and then invites Vasiliev over to Sasha's place and has sex with him. Dane is criticized by DCI Stanley for his haphazard approach to espionage in Moscow; that night, Dane becomes frustrated, rips up a tape, and calls someone requesting a meeting. After her evening with Vasiliev, Bea reconciles with Twila.
7	"Livin' Thing"	Ally Pankiw	Carolyn Cicalese & Jordan J. Riggs	January 15, 2026
Bea, Twila, Dane, and Ray surmise that the kompromat tapes are part of an operation to blackmail high-value American targets into becoming KGB assets, and that Vasiliev has his own blackmail operation targeting Russian government officials, which facilitated his quick rise within the KGB. Twila and Bea use a tracker to find the kompromat tape, and follow it once it has been loaded in an ambulance. They see Vasiliev get into the ambulance, and then stop briefly to hand a package to his wife. Bea follows Vasiliev, while Twila uses an excuse to get into Vasiliev's house and steal the package given to his wife. Twila examines the package, which appears to be a bottle of shampoo, while Bea discovers the location of the kompromat facility, where she witnesses footage of Vasiliev murdering a woman. Dane meets with a therapist, and undergoes electro-shock therapy. His therapist afterwards delivers a recording of their session to Emile, who kills him at Dane's instruction. Ray plans to go to an Elton John concert with his nanny, Eevi, which angers his wife, Cheryl. She demands to go instead, but after an argument Cheryl returns home early to see Eevi searching through their bedroom and has found a gun. Cheryl grabs the gun and shoots Eevi. Twila goes to the concert with Ivanna and meets Bea there, where the embassy employees meet with a Soviet delegation, and Bea is addressed by Vasiliev with "Hello, American."
8	"The Stranger"	Susanna Fogel	Susanna Fogel & David Iserson	January 15, 2026
Manya returns to her village in Belarus and reconnects with her best friend Sofia, but is being followed by an American asset. Dane and Emile eventually reveal themselves to her and together, they enter a safehouse to discover that Chris is still alive and in hiding. Twila and Bea fight off Vasiliev and escape the concert with Ivanna's help; they find Sasha, and flee to a dacha that Aksana told Bea about. Once they arrive, Twila discovers multiple boxes of the same shampoo that Vasiliev gave to his wife; she realizes that they all contain kompromat tapes. Realizing they are in Vasiliev's dacha, they pack up the kompromat and prepare to flee. As they are about to leave, they are attacked by Aksana and another agent, whom they kill, but not before Aksana stabs Sasha in the chest. As they drive away, Vasiliev chases them, but Twila maneuvers him into flipping his car on a sharp turn. Sasha is extracted by the U.S. Marines, and Twila and Bea drive back to Moscow with an injured Vasiliev. They interrogate him, and he reveals that it was actually Chris passing information to the Soviets. The mole is revealed to be Cheryl, who kills Eevi in her hospital room, and starts a fire in the evidence room. Bea and Twila attempt to flee, but find KGB agents posing as firefighters breaking into their offices to steal information from the Americans. Vasiliev confidently leaves while the KGB agents hold Bea and Twila at gunpoint.

== Production ==
The series is created by Susanna Fogel and David Iserson. Fogel directs the series, with Iserson as showrunner. Jessica Rhoades executive produces for Pacesetter Productions and Alison Mo Massey co-executive produces along with Katherine Bridle. Universal Television are producers. In August 2024, Emilia Clarke became attached to star and be an executive producer on the series.

Haley Lu Richardson joined the cast in November 2024. On February 4, 2025, Adrian Lester and Nicholas Podany were among those added to the cast.

Filming began in Budapest, Hungary in February 2025.

On June 23, 2026, Peacock canceled the series after one season, with Variety noting that while the series was critically acclaimed, the specific viewing ratings for the series were not available, beyond the fact that it had never appeared on the Nielsen streaming top 10 charts.

== Release ==
The series premiered on January 15, 2026, on Peacock, with all eight episodes released at once.

== Reception ==
On the review aggregator website Rotten Tomatoes, 94% of 33 critics' reviews are positive, with an average rating of 7.7/10. The website's consensus reads: "As much a buddy adventure as it is an espionage caper, Ponies' likable trot of a story gradually achieves full gallop thanks to Emilia Clarke and Haley Lu Richardson's tag-team charisma." Metacritic, which uses a weighted average, assigned the series a score of 76 out of 100, based on 12 critics, indicating "generally favorable" reviews. Vulture praised Clarke and Richardson's on-screen chemistry and how the series allows them to "put a spin on the types you may already associate with them" such as Daenerys Targaryen in Game of Thrones and Portia in The White Lotus. Likewise, Variety calls Clarke and Richardson's chemistry the "glue that binds the whole enterprise together".

In a more mixed review, Rendy Jones of RogerEbert.com noted that the series is overly reliant on late-’70s music to maintain the viewers’ attention, its spy narrative is overfamiliar, and 1970s pastiche does not always work. Angie Han of The Hollywood Reporter concluded that while Ponies "throws everything it can at the wall in search of excitement and sweetness and humor and tragedy" to have "moments of dazzle", ultimately the show's lack of depth, imprecise writing and consequently, unconvincing performances, make it a "forgettable distraction".
