= Pervomaisky (cinema) =

Movie theater in Moscow, Russia

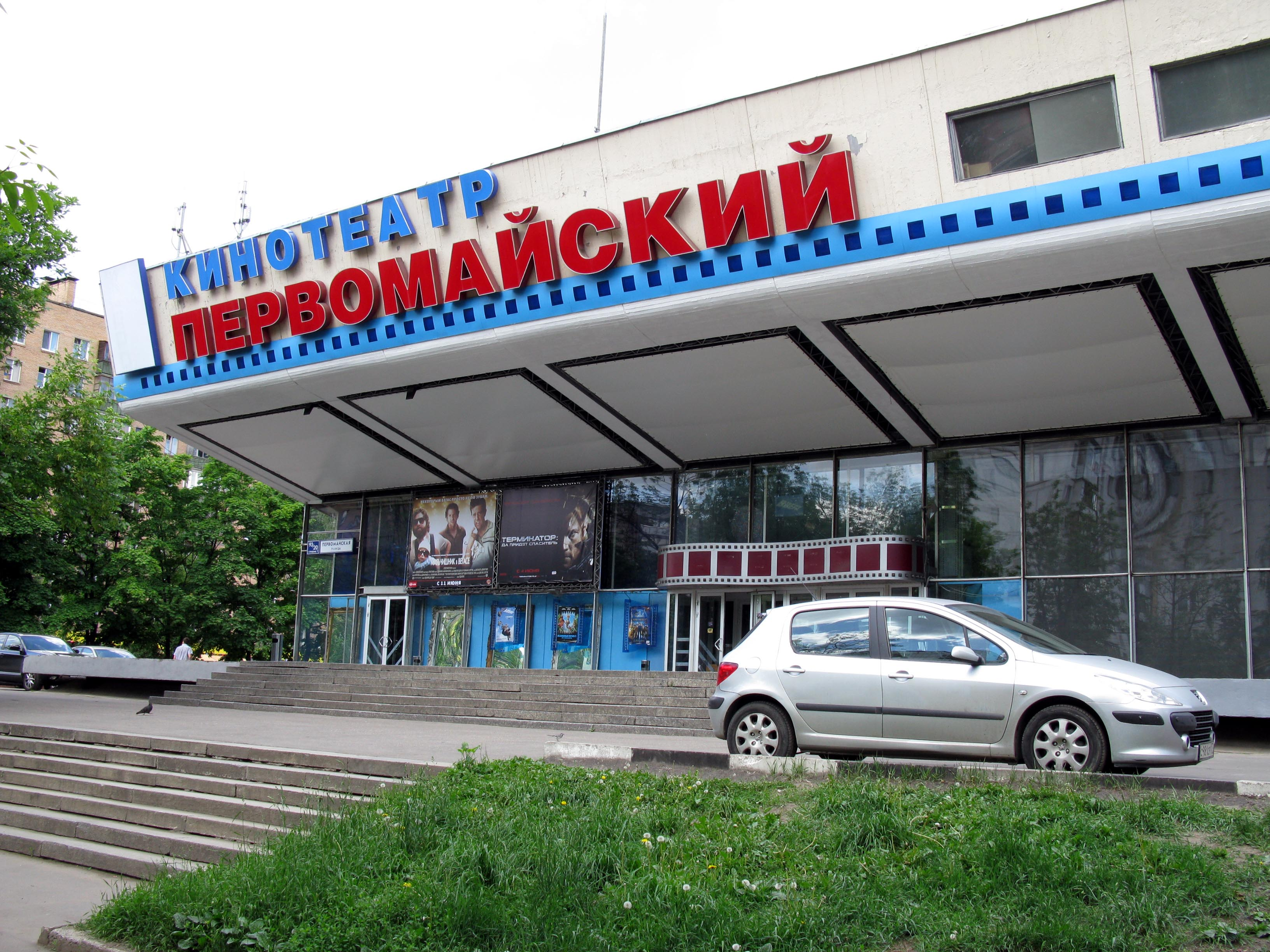
Image of the Pervomaisky (cinema)

Pervomaisky (Russian: Первомайский (кинотеатр) is a movie theater in the east of Moscow (Pervomayskaya street, house 93/20). It was built in 1969 as a "standard project". It has been under reconstruction since 2017.

== History ==
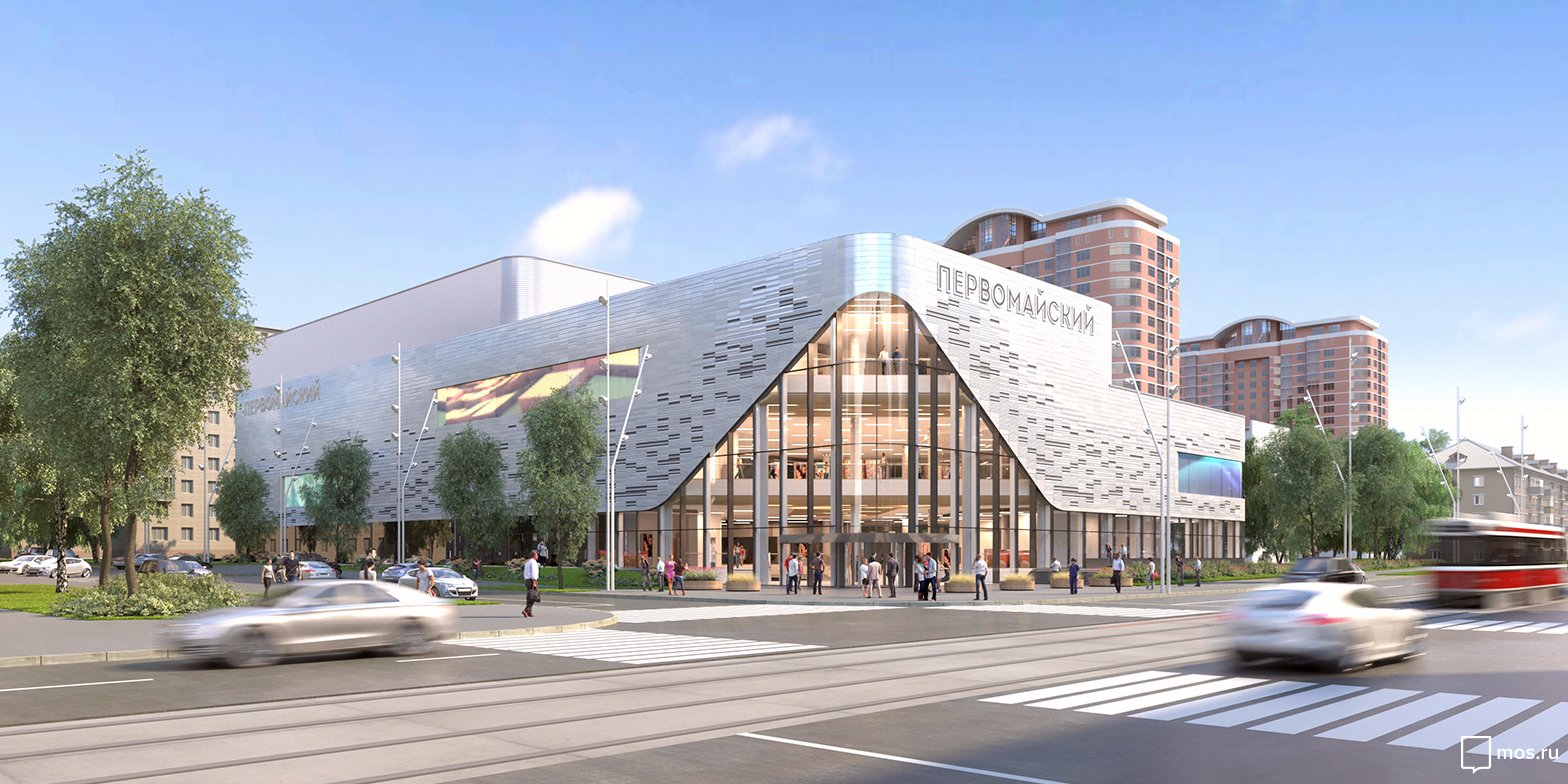
Reconstruction project of 2017

The Pervomaisky Cinema was built in 1969 as a typical project of a regional cinema (architects DS Solopov, MN Kazarnovsky, engineers Yu. Dykhovichny and Yu. Rozovsky). For the construction of the cinema, its designers were awarded the USSR Council of Ministers Prize.

In 2014, the cinema was purchased from the Government of Moscow by ADG Group. In 2017, "Pervomaysky" got into the city program of reconstruction of cinemas. The reconstruction project was developed by the British architectural bureau Amanda Levet. According to the project, the cinema will have a streamlined facade. The entrance to the cinema from the intersection of Pervomayskaya and 11th Park streets will be similar to the nose of a ship and have a wide stained glass glazing. The facade will be covered with ceramic panels. On the roof will be a summer cafe and a garden with recreation areas.

== Architecture ==
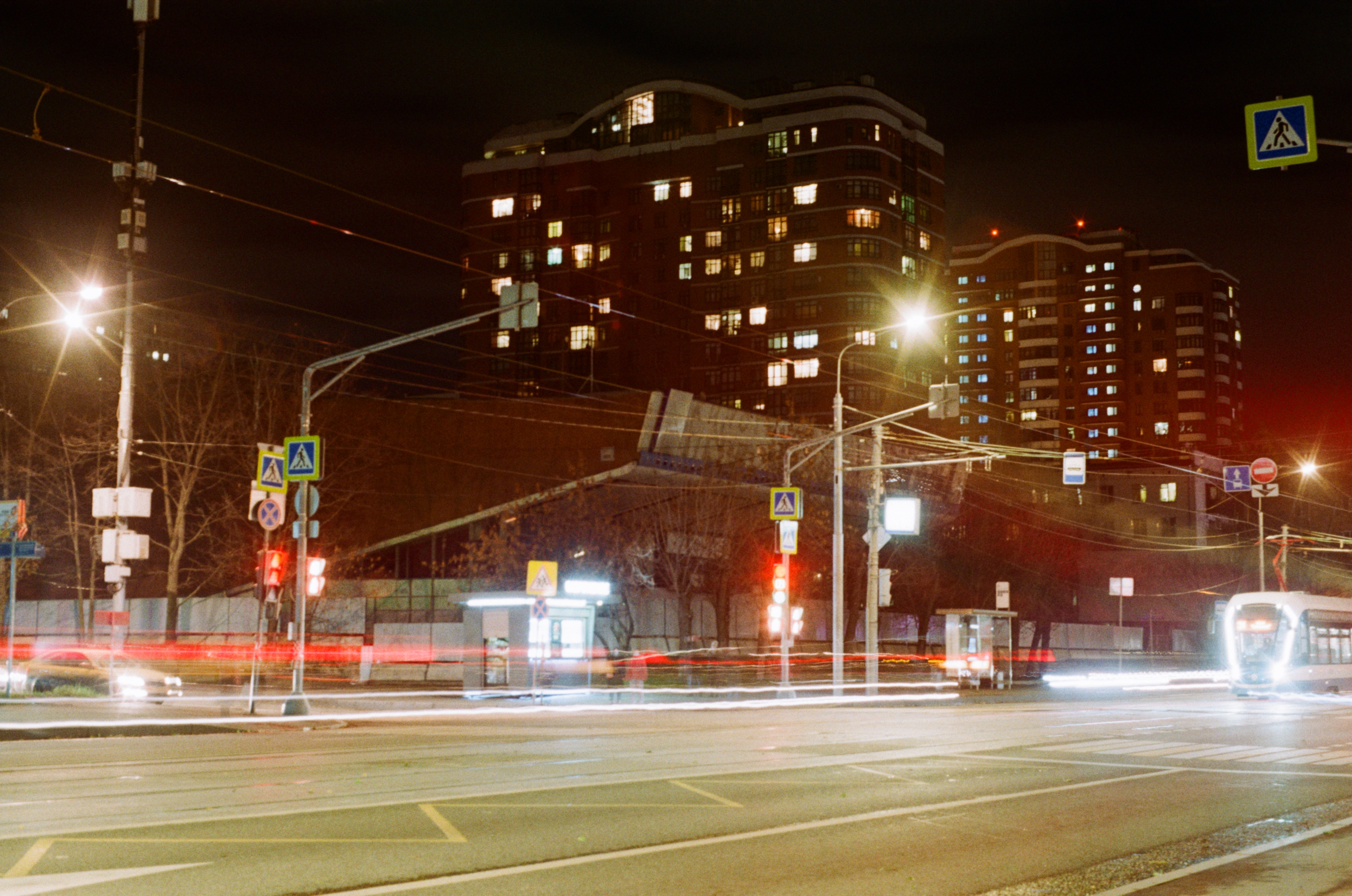
Building just before demolition (2020)

The original "Pervomaisky" cinema was built in a similar style as the Rossiya Theatre, among the architects of which was also DS Solopov. At the heart of his composition is a powerful "wedge" of the auditorium with a steep amphitheater and a glazed foyer. In his planning, the advances in the field of cinema technology were taken into account. Instead of using finishing materials, the architects left natural building structures (concrete, prefabricated reinforced concrete, brick) naked, which made the building look purely utilitarian.

The volume of the auditorium of the cinema appears outward in the form of a visor, its lower plane forming the ceiling of the foyer's rooms. The ceilings are made of ribbed reinforced concrete slabs. The foyer is two-level. On the lower level there is a buffet, for which a summer cafe could be organized in the warm season. One of the walls of the lower foyer was faced with mirrors, there is a mosaic pattern. The auditorium has a large screen was designed with a capacity of 1,400 people. Its walls were lined with acoustic material - a travertone. On the ceiling of the hall is an open construction of metal trusses with built-in lamps. The cinema has a curtain decorated with a composition on the theme of cinema, created by the artists A. Voronkov and B. Pogorelov.
