= Live from Moscow 1979 =

Live album by Elton John
- Released: 13 April 2019 (limited edition LP); 24 January 2020
- Recorded: 28 May 1979
- Venue: Rossiya Concert Hall, Moscow
- Length: 97:44
- Label: Universal Music

Elton John chronology
Diamonds (2017)	Live from Moscow 1979 (2019)	Rocketman: Music from the Motion Picture (2019)

Live from Moscow 1979 is a live album by British musician Elton John released in April 2019. It was recorded during John's May 1979 tour of the Soviet Union, when he played a series of shows in Leningrad and Moscow accompanied by percussionist Ray Cooper. The live recordings were initially broadcast by BBC Radio 1 and were long available on bootleg albums. Footage was also included in the 1979 documentary To Russia...With Elton. The official release, as a limited-edition double LP, was issued for Record Store Day 2019 to celebrate the 40th anniversary of the tour. The album was then re-released in 2020 on vinyl and CD, and in digital music stores.

The album includes 16 of the 27 songs from John's 28 May concert at the Rossiya Concert Hall in Moscow. He describes the show as "probably one of the best concerts I've ever given in my life".

== Track listing ==
All songs written by Elton John and Bernie Taupin except where noted.

Disc one

1. "Daniel" – 3:56
2. "Skyline Pigeon" – 4:02
3. "Take Me to the Pilot" – 6:50
4. "Rocket Man" – 7:33
5. "Don't Let the Sun Go Down on Me" – 5:36
6. "Goodbye Yellow Brick Road" – 3:04
7. "Candle in the Wind" – 3:34
8. "I Heard It Through the Grapevine" (Norman Whitfield, Barrett Strong) – 11:50

Disc two

1. "Funeral for a Friend" – 2:57
2. "Tonight" – 7:41
3. "Better Off Dead" – 2:58
4. "Bennie and the Jets" – 12:31
5. "Sorry Seems to Be the Hardest Word" – 3:33
6. "Crazy Water" – 7:58
7. Medley: "Saturday Night's Alright (For Fighting)/Pinball Wizard" (John–Taupin/Pete Townshend) – 10:11
8. Medley: "Crocodile Rock/Get Back/Back in the U.S.S.R." (John–Taupin/Lennon–McCartney/Lennon–McCartney) – 3:30

== Personnel ==
- Elton John – vocals, grand piano, electric piano
- Ray Cooper – percussion (disc 2, tracks 1–7)

== Charts ==
Chart (2020)	Peak position
Belgian Albums (Ultratop Flanders)	198
Belgian Albums (Ultratop Wallonia)	79
French Albums (SNEP)	166
Scottish Albums (OCC)	44
Spanish Albums (PROMUSICAE)	59
US Top Album Sales (Billboard)	29
