= Artjom Gilz =

German-Russian actor (born 1987)

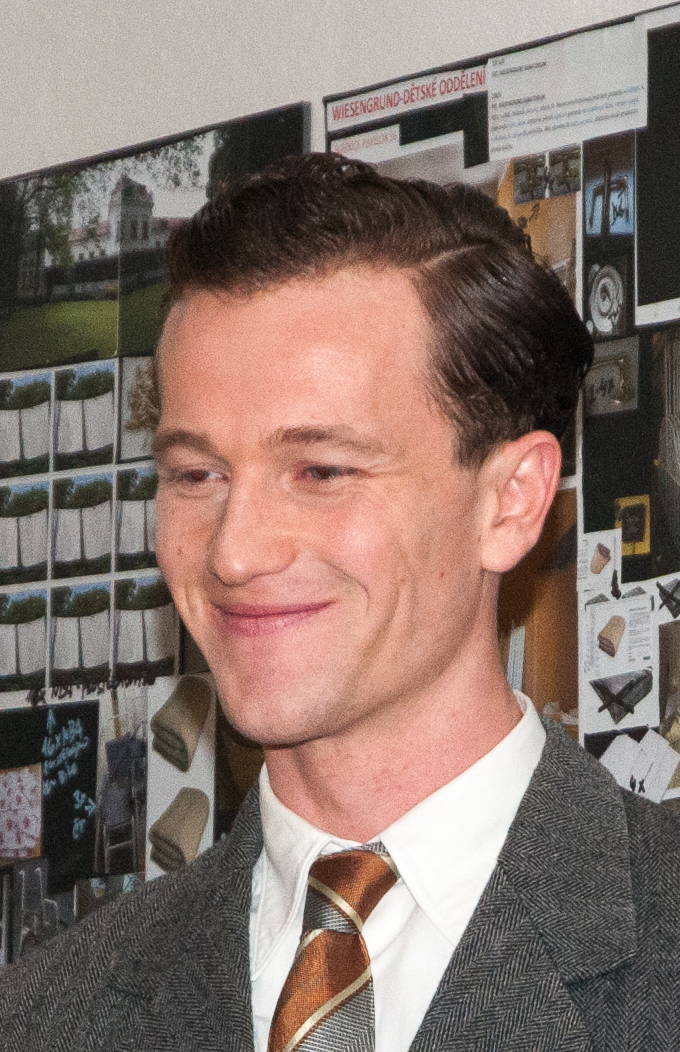
- Gilz in 2018
- Born: 1987 (age 38–39); Moskalenki, Siberia, Soviet Union
- Education: Berlin School of Economics and Law (BA)
- Occupation: Actor
- Years active: 2014–present
- Known for: Milk & Honey (TV series); Charité; Dunkelstadt; Ponies

Artjom Gilz (born 1987) is a German-Russian actor best known for his performances in Milk & Honey, Charité, Dunkelstadt, and Ponies.

== Life and career ==
Gilz was born in Moskalenki, Siberia, Soviet Union, and raised in Cloppenburg, Germany. He received his bachelor's degree in International Business at the Berlin School of Economics and Law, after which he studied acting at Robyn Kay Acting Studio in Toronto.

He has acted in the television series SOKO Wismar, Über die Grenze, Charité, Dunkelstadt, Milk & Honey, Spides, Das Boot, and Ponies. His film roles include Frühling, Club Europa, Die Farbe des Chamäleons, Die Whistleblowerin, Tár, and Die Polizistin und die Sprache des Todes.

Gilz speaks German, Russian, English, Spanish, French and Portuguese. He has lived in Berlin since 2007.
