= Shttl =

- Directed by: Ady Walter
- Written by: Ady Walter; Samuel Fischler
- Produced by: Jean-Charles Lévy; Yuriy Artemenko; Ryta Grebenchikova; Olias Barco
- Starring: Moshe Lobel; Saul Rubinek; Anisia Stasevich; Petro Ninovskyi; Antoine Millet
- Cinematography: Volodymyr Ivanov
- Edited by: Jérémie Bole du Chaumont
- Music by: David Federmann
- Production companies: Ukrainian Producers Hub; Apple Tree Vision; Forecast Pictures
- Distributed by: Menemsha Films (USA)
- Release dates: 13 October 2022 (BFI); 26 October 2023 (Ukraine); 13 December 2023 (France)
- Running time: 114 minutes
- Countries: Ukraine; France
- Languages: Yiddish; Ukrainian

Shttl (Yiddish: שטטל, Ukrainian: «Шттл») is a 2022 Ukrainian–French one-shot drama film written and directed by Ady Walter and starring Moshe Lobel and Saul Rubinek. The film depicts the lives of a Jewish shtetl on the eve of Operation Barbarossa. It was filmed in Ukraine six months before the 2022 Russian invasion.

Shttl premiered at the 2022 London Film Festival, and won the Audience Award one week later at the Rome Film Festival.

The missing 'e' in the title (normally spelled "shtetl") is a reference to Georges Perec's La disparition, a 1969 novel which doesn't contain the letter. The missing 'e', in French pronounced the same way as "eux" (they), represents, according to Walter, their absence, the void left behind in the Shoah; Perec's father died in the war, and his mother was killed in Auschwitz.

On September 8, 2023, it was announced that Shttl is on the shortlist to represent Ukraine for the 96th Academy Awards. It was not ultimately nominated.

The film received two Golden Dzyga nominations by the Ukrainian Film Academy for its cinematography and production design.

== Plot ==
Mendele, an aspiring filmmaker, has left his Hasidic community and joined the Red Army. On June 21, 1941, he returns to his shtetl in Western Ukraine, along with his Ukrainian best friend, Demyan. They plan to run away with the Rebbe's daughter, Yuna. However, she is already set to marry Folie, a zealous Hasid hoping to succeed the Rebbe as leader of the shtetl.

The Soviet Union has already been infiltrating the shtetl, indoctrinating the community with Soviet propaganda, and threatening the Jewish way of life. The conflict of contemporary ideologies is inflamed by Mendele's presence, as he speaks with old friends and intervenes in local matters.

Meanwhile, just across the border with Poland, Nazi Germany is preparing for their imminent invasion of the Soviet Union.

== Cast ==
- Moshe Lobel as Mendele
- Anisia Stasevich as Yuna
- Petro Ninovskyi as Demyan
- Saul Rubinek as Rebbe Weitsenzang
- Antoine Millet as Folie
- Daniel Kenigsberg as Shloime
- Emily Karpel as Beilke
- Oleksandr Yeremenko as Menachem
- Lili Rosen as Zishe
- Yurko Kritenko as Shmulke
- Philipp Mogilnitskiy as Noach
- Yevheniya Miakenka as Woman 1
- Valeria Shpak as Woman 2
- Sharon Azrieli as Dina

== Production ==
In March, 2021, the Ukrainian press announced plans to film Shttl, a co-production between Ukrainian, French and Belgian producers, with the support of the Ukrainian State Film Agency.

Production designer Ivan Levchenko and art director Iuliia Antykova constructed a village 60 kilometers from Kyiv. The crew built 25 buildings, including one of the largest hand-painted synagogues in the world, and collected historical artifacts from all over Ukraine to fill the sets.

Cinematographer Volodymyr Ivanov filmed a series of long shots, which were then edited by Jérémie Bole du Chaumont to have the appearance of one continuous shot. Most of the film was shot in black-and-white, with flashbacks done in color.

On September 1, 2021, Deadline Hollywood reported that principal photography on the film had wrapped. The set was to be turned into a museum, but now remains inaccessible due to the Russian invasion of Ukraine.

== Music ==
SHTTL (Original Motion Picture Soundtrack)

Soundtrack album by David Federmann
- Released: December 13, 2023
- Genres: film score, classical, jazz, klezmer, nusach
- Length: 69 minutes

The film's score was composed and conducted by David Federmann, combining elements of jazz, classical and klezmer with modern cinematic music. The soundtrack also features traditional Yiddish songs, as well as Sabbath prayer in Hebrew and Aramaic.

The music was recorded in Paris, Kyiv, Brussels and Montreal, with over 20 musicians, as well as Ukrainian and French choirs.

The album was released on December 13, 2023.

== Release ==
Shttl premiered October 16, 2022 at the London Film Festival, and won the Audience Award one week later at the Rome Film Festival. The American premiere was at the New York Jewish Film Festival on January 16, 2023.

The film was released in cinemas in Ukraine on October 26, 2023.

It opened in France on December 13, 2023, where it continued its theatrical run for fourteen consecutive weeks.

A limited North American release began on October 3, 2025 in New York, where it ran for seven months – breaking the record for the longest running film at New Plaza Cinema. It opened in Los Angeles at Laemmle Theatres on November 28, before expanding to additional cinemas across the U.S. and Canada.

== Reception ==
=== Critical response ===
Barry Levitt of /Film rated the film a 10 out of 10, calling it "a towering, single-take masterpiece of the lives we've lost."

Joshua Polanski of Boston Hassle gave the film a positive review and wrote, "Shttl is unlike anything you've seen... I doubt there is another film with quite the same chutzpah."

International critics received the film with enthusiasm, calling Shttl "a hypnotic masterpiece from an exciting new voice."

Lobel received praise from critics for his breakout performance, who called it "masterful" and "captivating." French newspaper Le Figaro writes, "In the role of Mendele, American actor Moshe Lobel is mesmerizing. With remarkable sensitivity, he embodies a man caught between two violently opposing worlds.”

=== Festivals and accolades ===
Partial list of international film festivals and awards for Shttl
Year	Country	Festival	Awards	ref.
2022	United Kingdom	BFI London Film Festival		
2022	Italy	Rome Film Festival	Winner: Audience Award	
2023	United States	New York Jewish Film Festival		
2023	France	Festival Diasporama	Winner: Audience Award	
2023	United States	Atlanta Jewish Film Festival	Jury Prize: Emerging Filmmaker	
2023	United States	Cleveland International Film Festival	Jury Prize: Honorable Mention	
2023	Canada	Toronto Jewish Film Festival		
2023	China	Shanghai International Film Festival		
2023	Germany	Berlin Jewish Film Festival	Jury Prize: Best Feature Film	
2023	Italy	Taormina Film Fest		
2023	Ukraine	Odesa International Film Festival		
2023	Slovakia	International Film Festival Cinematik		
2023	Poland	Warsaw Jewish Film Festival		
2023	Australia	Jewish International Film Festival	Winner: Audience Award	
2023	United States	Centre Film Festival	Jury Prize: Gratitude Award	
2023	Hong Kong	Hong Kong Jewish Film Festival	Winner: Best First Feature	
2023	Poland	Camerimage		
2024	Croatia	Festival of Tolerance		
2024	Ukraine	Ukrainian Academy Award	Nominated: Best Cinematography	
2024	Ukraine	Ukrainian Academy Award	Nominated: Best Production Design	
