= Angry Angel =

2017 American television film

- Promotional poster
- Screenplay by: David Iserson
- Story by: Will Gluck
- Directed by: Jamie Travis
- Starring: Brenda Song; Andy Favreau; Andrew Bachelor; Jason Biggs
- Music by: John Swihart
- Country of origin: United States
- Original language: English

Production
- Producers: Jamie Travis; Will Gluck; Richard Schwartz
- Running time: 83 minutes
- Production companies: Olive Bridge Entertainment; Sony Pictures Television

Original release
- Network: Freeform
- Release: November 27, 2017

Angry Angel is a 2017 American romantic comedy-drama television film written by David Iserson and directed by Jamie Travis. The film premiered on Freeform on November 27, 2017, as part of the channel's annual Countdown to the 25 Days of Christmas.

== Plot ==
Allison Pyke is an angel who receives smartphone notifications for miracles to perform in exchange for points (the Miracle on the Hudson earns her 40,000 points). She has been trapped in New York City for nine years trying to earn 10,000 points to be admitted into heaven for having led a life that was "good but not too good" as Megan Dorsey. As part of her cover, she works as a waitress and regularly has sex with her boss James Barker.

Leonard, another angel in New York who competes with her for miracles, tells her she would get more points if she shows initiative, so when she gets a notification to save a college student's computer, she asks the student about his crush and unites him with her. She is awarded over 11,000 points for helping them find true love, and her angel mentor, Jason Biggs, congratulates her personally and tells her she will be transported to heaven by Greyhound Lines.

At the bus station, she finds Patrick Dorsey, her husband from her past life, and his new love Jill, arriving from Nebraska to spend the holidays in New York. Knowing that if she reveals her identity she will lose all her points, she offers to be their tour guide as an excuse to spend time with him before leaving Earth. Despite Jason Biggs warning her of the risk, she invites them to a Christmas party with Barker and his barista Connie.

As she slowly gets drunk on eggnog, it becomes harder for her to hide her jealousy towards Jill. Barker notices and tries to ask her about it. Jason Biggs, watching from the gates of heaven, tries to get her to stop via SMS. She runs from Barker and her phone and tells Patrick the truth. They kiss but are seen by Jill.

Pyke faints and awakens the next day to be told by Jason Biggs she needs to make up her lost points by "cleaning up [her] mess", so she finds Connie, Barker, Jill, and Patrick and tries to apologize to each in turn. Patrick is able to get closure by talking to her and accepts Jill as his new significant other, which allows her to recover all her points.

She travels to heaven with Leonard but keeps watching the miracle requests that appear on her phone. Two weeks after her ascension, she sees a request for Barker, who is about to get crushed by a falling pipe. She steals Gandhi's afterlife car and manages to stop Baker just in time. Before she can let him know it was her, a female French jogger comes check on him, and it is implied he will travel with her to France to fulfil all the dreams he's been holding back on to be with Pyke.

For stealing the car, she is sentenced to 100,000 points, and begins by trying to replicate the Miracle on the Hudson, this time in San Francisco Bay.

== Cast ==
- Brenda Song as Allison Pyke
- Andy Favreau as James Barker
- Andrew Bachelor as Leonard
- Ricky Mabe as Patrick Dorsey
- Jason Biggs as himself

== Production ==
Filming began in August 2017 in Toronto, Canada.

== See also ==
- List of films about angels
