= Lili Rosen =

American actress

- מלכה ליבא ראזען
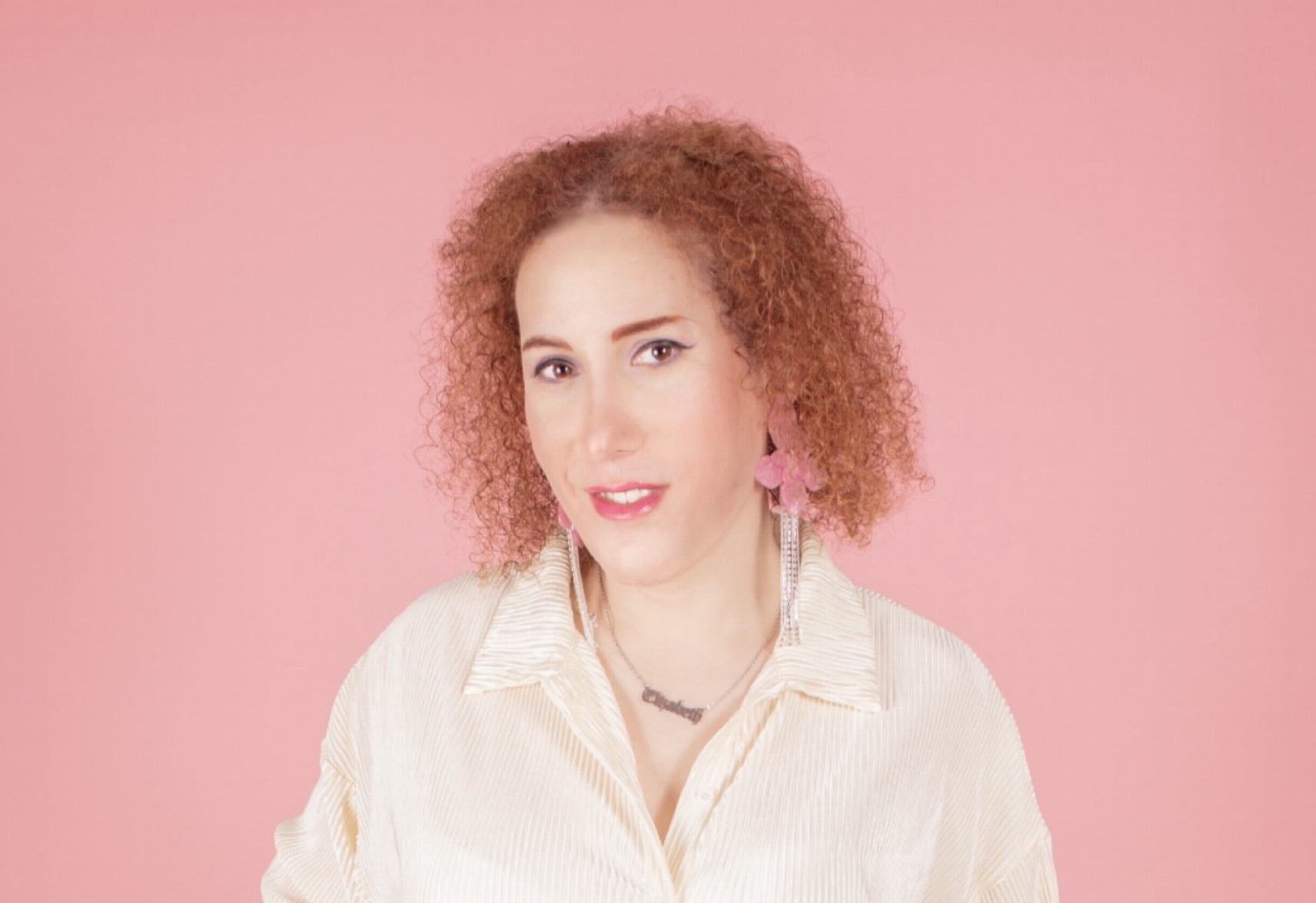
- Rosen in 2024
- Born: Borough Park, Brooklyn, New York, U.S.
- Occupations: Actress, cultural consultant, translator
- Years active: 2017–present
- Known for: Work on Unorthodox, Yiddish translation, LGBTQ advocacy
- Notable work: The Second Circumcision of Lili Rosen, The Binding of Itzik
- Television: Unorthodox (2020)
- Awards: AFI Award for Best Television Series (2020), SFFILM Rainin Development Grant (2023)

Lili Rosen is an American transgender actress and cultural consultant. She is best known for her work on the Netflix series Unorthodox, which garnered her the AFI award for best television series in 2020. She made headlines when she came out as transgender after playing the Rabbi in Unorthodox, and published the first LGBTQ resource in Yiddish translation. In another first, in 2024, she developed and performed The Second Circumcision of Lili Rosen, the first theatrical show by a "trans woman of Hasidic experience."

== Acting career ==
=== Theater ===
In 2017, Rosen made her stage debut in a production of Sholem Asch's Yiddish classic God of Vengeance. Rosen also played the role of Jean in Rhinoceros and the role of Vladimir in Waiting for Godot in Yiddish.

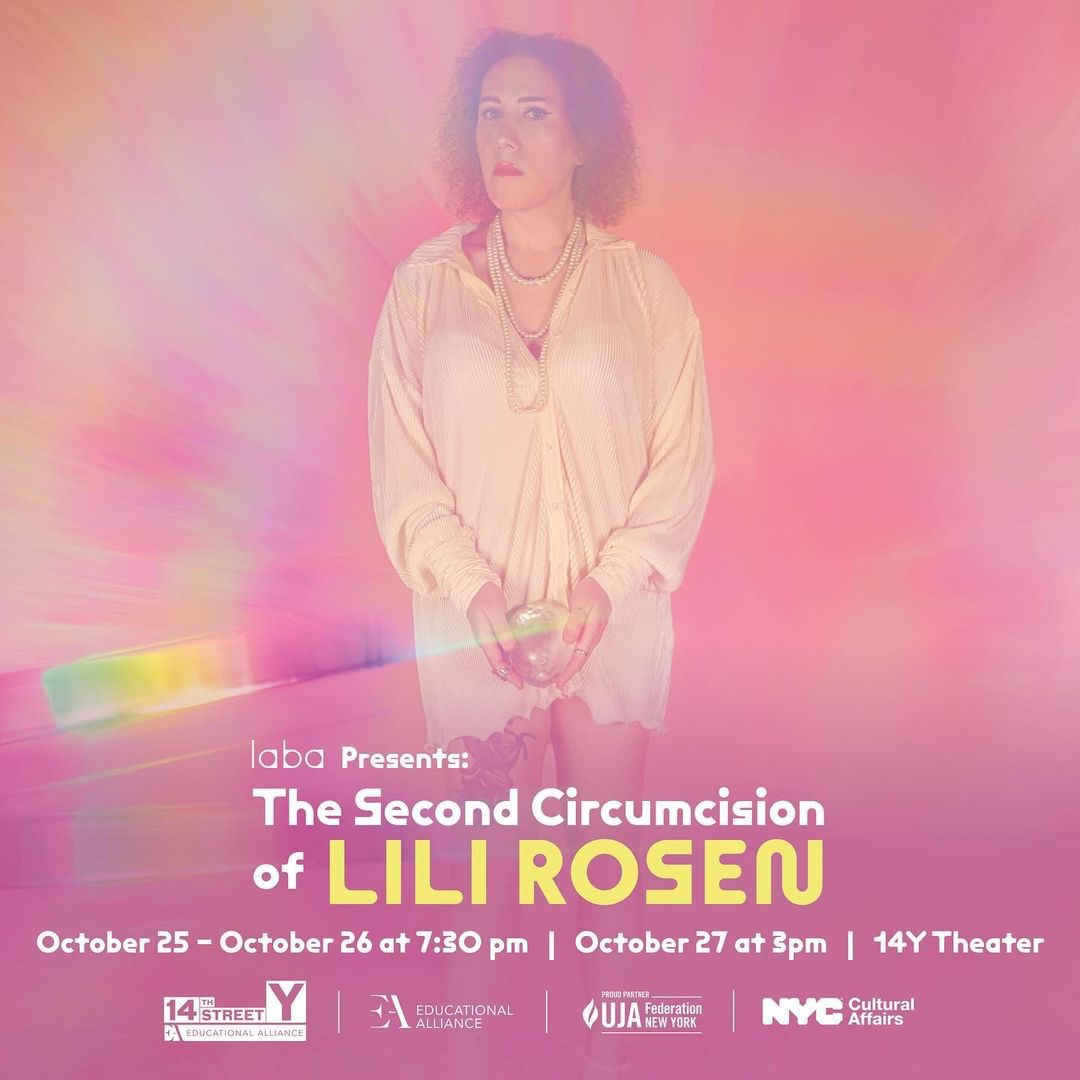
The show poster for the premiere of The Second Circumcision of Lili Rosen on October 25, 2024, in NYC.

In 2024, Rosen debuted a one-woman-show called "The Second Circumcision of Lili Rosen" at the 14th Street Y Theater in the East Village, Manhattan. In her show, Rosen tells the story of her Hasidic upbringing, her gender transition, and coming out to her Hasidic family.

=== Film ===
Rosen played the title character in the short film The Binding of Itzik, which was nominated with the Iris Prize, and won numerous awards, including the JFI Film Completion Grant, Film Movement Best Narrative Short Award at the San Francisco Jewish Film Festival, Best Film Award (Berlin Underground Film Festival), Jury Award (International Women's Film Festival), and Audience Choice Award (YoFiFest).

In 2023, Rosen won the SFFILM Rainin Development Grant for The Binding of Itzik.

Other film roles include "Zishe" in SHTTL, "Principal Rabbi" in Minyan, and "Shulem" in Tzadeikis.

=== Television ===
Rosen had a recurring role in the 2020 German miniseries Unorthodox, in which she played the Rabbi.

== Consulting ==
Dubbed by Air Mail as "Hollywood's Yiddish Consultant", Rosen is a Yiddish specialist who consulted on shows including Shttl, Unorthodox, Little America (TV series), An American Pickle and Minyan (film).

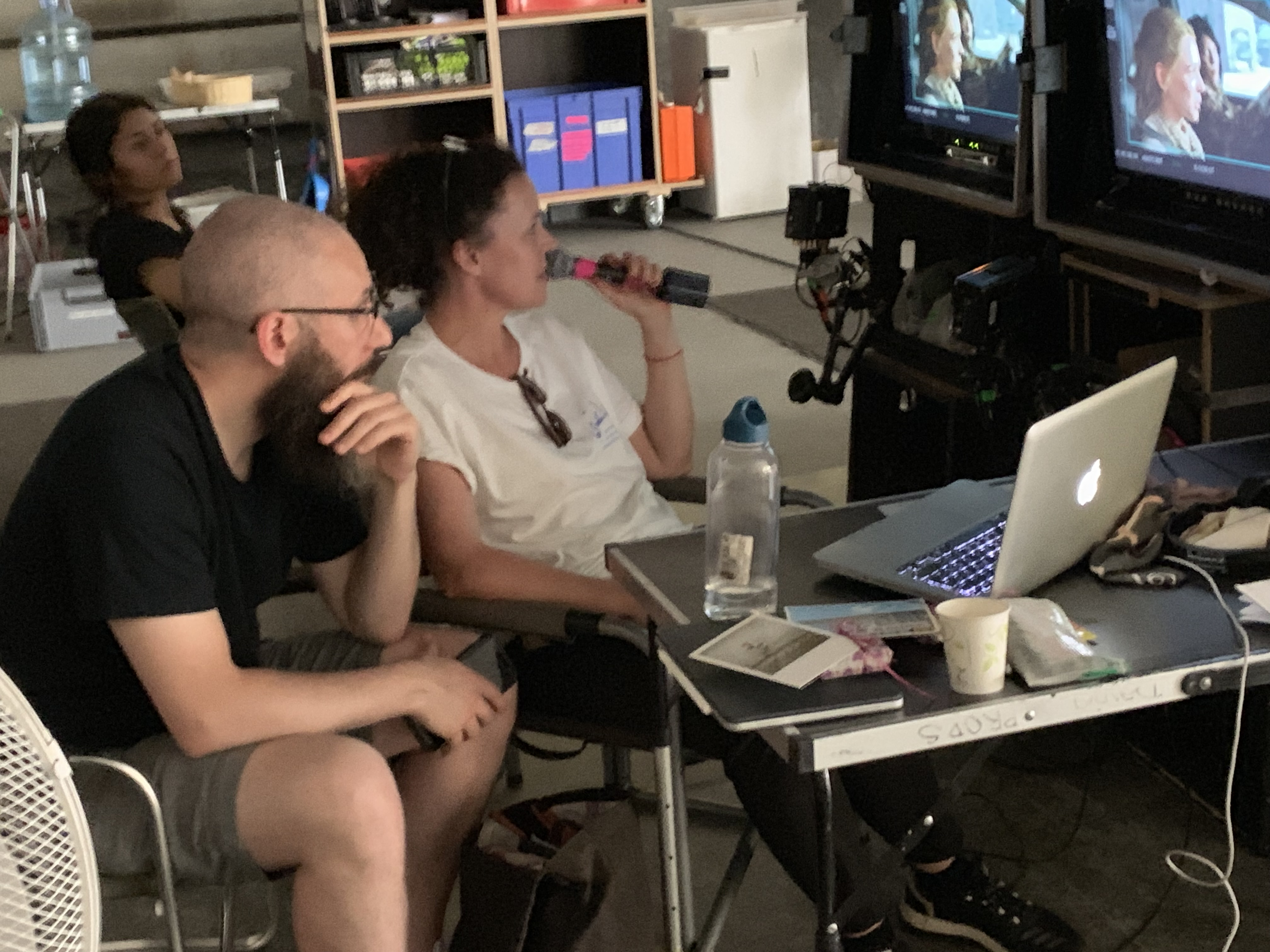
Lili Rosen consulting on the set of Unorthodox in Berlin with director Maria Schrader.

=== Unorthodox ===
Unorthodox was the first Netflix series to be filmed primarily in Yiddish. Rosen was "the first person hired" on the series to ensure the authentic portrayal of the Hasidic Yiddish-speaking community. Rosen was brought in early to translate the script into Yiddish, coach the actors, consult on cultural details, and play the rabbi. Shira Haas, the Emmy-nominated star of Unorthodox (miniseries), credited Rosen with her ability to speak Yiddish in the series, calling her "an amazing teacher." Emmy-winning director Maria Schrader said that she "would've been lost without [Rosen's] advice." Rosen acted as the "backstage rabbi" on set, working on set every day, conferring with Maria Schrader, offering technical and emotional support, and was involved in writing many of the scenes. In recognition of her influential work, Rosen was awarded the Best Screen Stories award by the American Film Institute in 2020.

== Translation ==
In addition to translating TV and film scripts into Yiddish, Rosen translated "You Be You: The Kid's Guide to Gender, Sexuality and Family" into Yiddish—the first LGBTQ youth guide in Yiddish. In her translation, she had to decide on appropriate Yiddish language terminology for many LGBTQ+ terms and related concepts that did not previously exist, at least in print.

She also translated several theatrical plays into Yiddish, including Eugène Ionesco's Rhinoceros, and two plays by Hanoch Levin.

== Personal life ==
Rosen was born and raised in the Hasidic community of Borough Park, Brooklyn. She was a cantor and an attorney before she got divorced and left the Hasidic community.

In 2022, Rosen came out as trans during an interview about an upcoming release of a book. The story was first reported by The Jerusalem Post in a headline reading "Ex-Hasid who advised 'Unorthodox' comes out as trans." This story was syndicated appearing in other Jewish newspapers worldwide. Since coming out, she is largely estranged from her family.

In a recent interview, she said that she felt an obligation or a calling to use her voice on behalf of her trans siblings.

In 2024, Rosen was featured on the cover of Crain's New York Business. In the interview, she talks candidly about her medical transition and her experience with the health care system experience, while calling for universal access to trans health care.
