= David Iserson =

American writer

- Born: December 3, 1977 (age 48); Freehold, New Jersey, United States
- Education: Northwestern University
- Occupation: Writer
- Writing career
- Language: English
- Genres: Comedy, Dramedy, Drama
- Notable works: Mad Men; Mr. Robot; New Girl; Up All Night; Saturday Night Live

David Iserson (born December 3, 1977) is an American writer and producer living in Los Angeles, CA. When he was twenty five, he was hired to write on the 2003-2004 season of Saturday Night Live. He has since written and produced episodes of Mr. Robot, Mad Men, New Girl, Up All Night, and United States of Tara. In 2014, his debut young adult fiction novel, Firecracker, was chosen as one of Rolling Stone's "40 Best YA Novels."

== Background and career ==
Iserson attended Northwestern University, where he graduated with a degree in Communications from its Radio/Television/Film program.

== Writing credits ==
Key
†	Denotes works that have not yet been released

=== Film ===
Year	Title	Writer	Executive Producer	Notes
2017	Angry Angel	Teleplay	No	
2018	The Spy Who Dumped Me	Yes	Yes	

=== Television ===
Year	Title	Creator	Writer	Executive Producer	Notes
2003–2004	Saturday Night Live	No	Yes	No	
2009–2011	United States of Tara	No	Yes	No	
2011–2012	Up All Night	No	Yes	Co-producer	
2012–2014	New Girl	No	Yes	Producer	
2014	Mad Men	No	Yes	Co-producer	
2015	Mr. Robot	No	Yes	Supervising	
2015	Mozart in the Jungle	No	Yes	No	
2016	Graves	No	Yes	Supervising	
2017	Graves	No	Yes	Supervising	
2020	Run	No	Yes	Consulting	
2026	Ponies	Yes	Yes	Yes	Also showrunner

== Books ==
Razorbill, an imprint of Penguin Books USA, published Iserson's first YA novel, Firecracker in 2013.

== Radio ==
In 2007, Iserson appeared on "The Spokesman" (Episode 338) of This American Life, discussing his teenage appearance in his father's local TV ad.
