= Petro Ninovskyi =

Ukrainian actor

- Петро Ніньовський
- Born: Kolomyia, Ukraine
- Education: Kyiv National I. K. Karpenko-Kary Theatre, Cinema and Television University (BA, MA); Juilliard School (MFA)
- Occupation: Actor
- Known for: Shttl, Ponies

Petro Ninovskyi (Ukrainian Петро Ніньовський) is a Ukrainian actor. He is known for starring in Shttl, The Silence, My Young Prince, and the Peacock series Ponies (2026).

== Life and career ==
Ninovskyi was born and raised in Kolomyia, Ukraine. He began acting at age six. He completed his bachelor's degree and graduate degree in acting at the Kyiv National I.K. Karpenko-Kary Theatre, Cinema, and Television University. Ninovskyi received his master of fine art degree in drama from Juilliard in group 54. He was the program's first Ukrainian student.

Ninovskyi acted in the series Sydórenky - Sydorénky and The Silence, as well as the films My Young Prince and Shttl. In 2026 he was a main cast member in the spy thriller series Ponies as Sasha, a Soviet Union informant for the CIA.

He co-hosted a series of poetry and music events with actress Svitlana Kosolapova to fundraise for the war in Ukraine.
