= Elton John's 1979 tour of the Soviet Union =

1979 concert tour by Elton John

- National tour by Elton John
- Ticket for a concert Moscow
- Location: USSR
- Associated album: A Single Man
- Start date: 21 May 1979
- End date: 28 May 1979
- No. of shows: 8

English rock singer Elton John played eight concerts in the Soviet Union between 21 and 28 May 1979. The two-city tour was a significant event amid Cold War tensions between the USSR and the Western world, and a sign of the Communist authorities' emerging tolerance towards Western popular culture. The shows were among the first performed in the USSR by a pop act, following visits by Cliff Richard and Boney M. Billboard magazine said that the shows were "significant and successful" and described John as "the first out-and-out rock artist to appear in the U.S.S.R."

As a result of the tour, in June 1979, the Soviet authorities permitted the state-owned Melodiya record company to issue John's 1978 album A Single Man, making it the first Western pop album to be officially released in the USSR. John's stay in the country was the subject of the television documentary film To Russia with Elton. BBC Radio 1's live broadcast of the 28 May show, held at Moscow's Rossiya Concert Hall, marked the first stereo satellite link-up between the USSR and the West.

== Background and concept ==
The concerts were part of Elton John's A Single Man tour and were performed with accompaniment by percussionist Ray Cooper. John's concept for the tour was to avoid the visual extravagance of his previous performances and ensure he focused on his singing and piano playing. As with his shows earlier in the tour, in Europe and Israel, the Russian concerts featured a set performed by John alone, followed by a set with Cooper, who played a range of percussion instruments. The shows were over two hours in length.

John believed that he was granted the opportunity to play in the USSR simply because he asked to. He said that the Soviet authorities were eager for other rock acts, including Eric Clapton, Paul McCartney and Pink Floyd, to visit but were unsure of the correct protocol when inviting Western artists. In addition, according to John, the Russians were distrustful of American promoters. After John's manager, John Reid, had placed a request with the Soviet embassy in London, a cultural officer from the embassy attended his show in Oxford on 17 April. Impressed, the representative invited John to perform ten concerts in Leningrad (present-day Saint Petersburg) and ten in Moscow; instead, Reid agreed to four shows in each city. The concerts were promoted by Harvey Goldsmith and the Russian company Goskontsert. John's payment of $1000 per show was the lowest he had received since playing at the Troubadour, a club in Los Angeles, in the early 1970s.

== Tour history ==
=== Arrival ===
John's image as a wealthy, flamboyant and openly bisexual entertainer was at odds with the austere image espoused by Communist Party doctrine. He and his entourage flew into Moscow on 20 May. The group were rushed to a railway station and then travelled overnight by train to Leningrad. The music, sound and other stage equipment was transported by truck through Europe to Leningrad.

Demand for the eight concerts was high, with ticket prices set at 8 roubles, which was about the average daily wage in the Soviet Union. Over 90 per cent of the tickets were taken by senior Party members, diplomats and military officers. The remainder were changing hands on the black market for up to 25 times the official price. As with other Western artists, John's music was only available in the USSR via illegal import. At the time, his records cost about $70 each on the black market.

=== Leningrad concerts ===
The opening show was at the 3800-seat Bolshoi Oktyabrsky (Great October) Concert Hall, where the atmosphere was unusually formal and reserved for a rock concert. John's first song of the night was "Your Song". When the houselights went up after his last number, "Crazy Water", but before he returned to the stage for his encore, many of the high-ranking officials left the hall; the genuine fans then began advancing towards the stage from their seats at the back of the venue. As John and Cooper performed several encores, these fans danced freely, singing along and giving peace signs to the security staff in what author David John DeCouto describes as "an extraordinary display of defiance". Robert Hilburn of the Los Angeles Times attended the concert and described the scene: "I was watching the official guests' faces. And there was that registering of, 'Why is this all going on?' And you see this dawning, and this expression and so forth, and it's a dangerous thing, it's a real powerful force. You saw what happened in the West in the '50s and '60s with this music." Newspapers around the world reported on the success of the concert. The Daily Telegraph's headline read, "Elton John Stuns Soviet Rock Fans", while a writer for The New York Times said that "policemen and other Soviet officials were helpless" in their efforts to control the crowd. John considered it the greatest accomplishment of his career up to that point, particularly since most of the audience were unfamiliar with his recordings.

I'd been told not to sing "Back in the USSR", so of course I did. If the KGB had been spying on me, they clearly hadn't been spying closely enough to learn that one of the quickest ways to get me to do something is to tell me not to do it.

— Elton John, 2019

Following the opening concert, John was officially requested to tone down his performance. He was asked to desist from playing the piano so energetically and from kicking over his piano stool during "Bennie and the Jets", and banned from playing his cover of the Beatles' "Back in the U.S.S.R." For the rest of the tour, John continued to close each performance with "Back in the U.S.S.R." He and Cooper were surprised at the audience's apparent lack of enthusiasm during the second show at the Great October Hall; they subsequently learned that officials were forcing fans to sit down as soon as they attempted to stand up or dance. That night, John incorporated the Russian song "Midnight in Moscow" into "Bennie and the Jets", while his set otherwise included a portion of Tchaikovsky's Piano Concerto No. 1.

John was asked to perform a private concert at his hotel that same night, supported by Cooper on drums and Clive Franks, his sound engineer, on bass. The following morning, due to a severe hangover, John abandoned his and Cooper's officially sanctioned visit to the Winter Palace. An English tabloid reported the event under the headline "Elton Snubs Russians in Winter Palace Revolt".

Following the last of his four shows at the Great October Hall, John departed by train for Moscow. Fans gathered at the railway station to send him off, throwing flowers and small gifts such as stuffed teddy bears. John was moved to tears at this gesture, aware of the hardships faced by citizens under the Communist regime and the inflated prices they would have paid for these luxury items.

=== Moscow concerts ===
John's four concerts at the Rossiya Concert Hall in Moscow were well received by the audiences. Among his cultural activities in the city, John visited a stadium that was being built in preparation for the USSR's hosting of the 1980 Summer Olympic Games. Further to his interest in football as the owner of the English club Watford, he also watched a match between CSKA Moscow and a team of Dinamo Minsk personnel. While addressing the press after watching the changing of the guard outside Lenin's Mausoleum, he stated his aversion to apartheid in sport, whether based on colour, class or sexual preference. The Russian interpreter who translated these comments omitted any reference to sexual preference, in line with the USSR's hardline on homosexuality.

Following his first show in Moscow, John posed for photographers outside the Kremlin in Red Square. He adopted a Cossack stance, dressed irreverently in a magenta-coloured jacket, yellow trousers and a long chain of pearls. Billboard reported on the success of the visit and commented on the "strong audience reaction" to Cooper, particularly his "theatrical" presence and "aging scholar" look. The magazine reproduced part of an editorial about the tour that was published in the British tabloid The Sun: "All credit to Elton John for rocking staid, stuffy Russian society to its foundations ... Even now, the ruling Communist party is distrustful of the decadent music of the West. But not so the ordinary Russian citizen, particularly the youngsters, who are fed up with dreary, boring, officially approved entertainment."

=== Aftermath ===
The international coverage afforded John's visit to the USSR ensured that it was a more significant event than all the previous tours there by Western artists. In DeCouto's description, the British Embassy in Moscow declared it "the single most important step forward in East–West relationships since Khruschev had visited Hollywood back in '59".

In a 1986 interview, John said his Soviet hosts "Obviously ... wanted pre-Olympic propaganda" and he regretted that only 10 per cent of the concert tickets were made available to the Russian public. He nonetheless recalled the tour as "an amazing experience" and highlighted the generosity of the Russian people he had met.

== Documentary film and radio broadcast ==
John's stay in the USSR was filmed by Dick Clement and Ian La Frenais. The footage was edited for a documentary film, titled To Russia with Elton. The film includes footage of John's final concert in Moscow and scenes showing the political context of the tour and his reactions to Russian culture. The film was shown in cinemas in the United Kingdom in the summer of 1979, as part of a double-bill with Clement and La Frenais' film Porridge, based on their television series.

The final concert of the tour, held at the Rossiya Concert Hall on 28 May, was broadcast live throughout Europe by the BBC. It marked the first stereo satellite link-up between the USSR and the West. In Britain, the program aired on BBC Radio 1, hosted by disc jockey Andy Peebles. This recording of the 28 May show became available on several bootleg albums, including A Single Man in Moscow. Coinciding with the 40th anniversary of the tour, Universal Music released a limited-edition double LP, titled Live from Moscow 1979, for Record Store Day 2019. The album was subsequently re-released on vinyl and CD, and in digital music stores in January 2020.

== Tour dates ==
According to Ultimate Classic Rock and David John DeCouto:

Date	City	Venue
21 May 1979	Leningrad	Bolshoi Oktyabrsky Concert Hall
22 May 1979	Leningrad	Bolshoi Oktyabrsky Concert Hall
23 May 1979	Leningrad	Bolshoi Oktyabrsky Concert Hall
24 May 1979	Leningrad	Bolshoi Oktyabrsky Concert Hall
25 May 1979	Moscow	Rossiya Hotel Concert Hall
26 May 1979	Moscow	Rossiya Hotel Concert Hall
27 May 1979	Moscow	Rossiya Hotel Concert Hall
28 May 1979	Moscow	Rossiya Hotel Concert Hall

== Set list ==
John's set list varied little through the tour. His last concert in Moscow featured the following songs (all written by Elton John and Bernie Taupin unless noted otherwise):

1. "Your Song"
2. "Sixty Years On"
3. "Daniel"
4. "Skyline Pigeon"
5. "Take Me to the Pilot"
6. "Rocket Man"
7. "Don't Let the Sun Go Down on Me"
8. "Goodbye Yellow Brick Road"
9. "Roy Rogers"
10. "Candle in the Wind"
11. "Ego"
12. "Where to Now St. Peter?"
13. "He'll Have to Go" (Joe Allison, Audrey Allison)
14. "I Heard It Through the Grapevine" (Norman Whitfield, Barrett Strong)
15. "Funeral for a Friend"
16. "Tonight"
17. "Better Off Dead"
18. "Idol"
19. "I Think I'm Going to Kill Myself"
20. "I Feel Like a Bullet (In the Gun of Robert Ford)"
21. "Bennie and the Jets"
22. "Sorry Seems to Be the Hardest Word"
23. "Part-Time Love" (Elton John, Gary Osborne)
24. "Crazy Water"
25. "Song for Guy" (John)
26. Medley: "Saturday Night's Alright for Fighting/Pinball Wizard" (/Pete Townshend)
27. Medley: "Crocodile Rock"/"Get Back"/"Back in the U.S.S.R." (/John Lennon, Paul McCartney)
