= Moshe Lobel =

American actor, filmmaker and musician

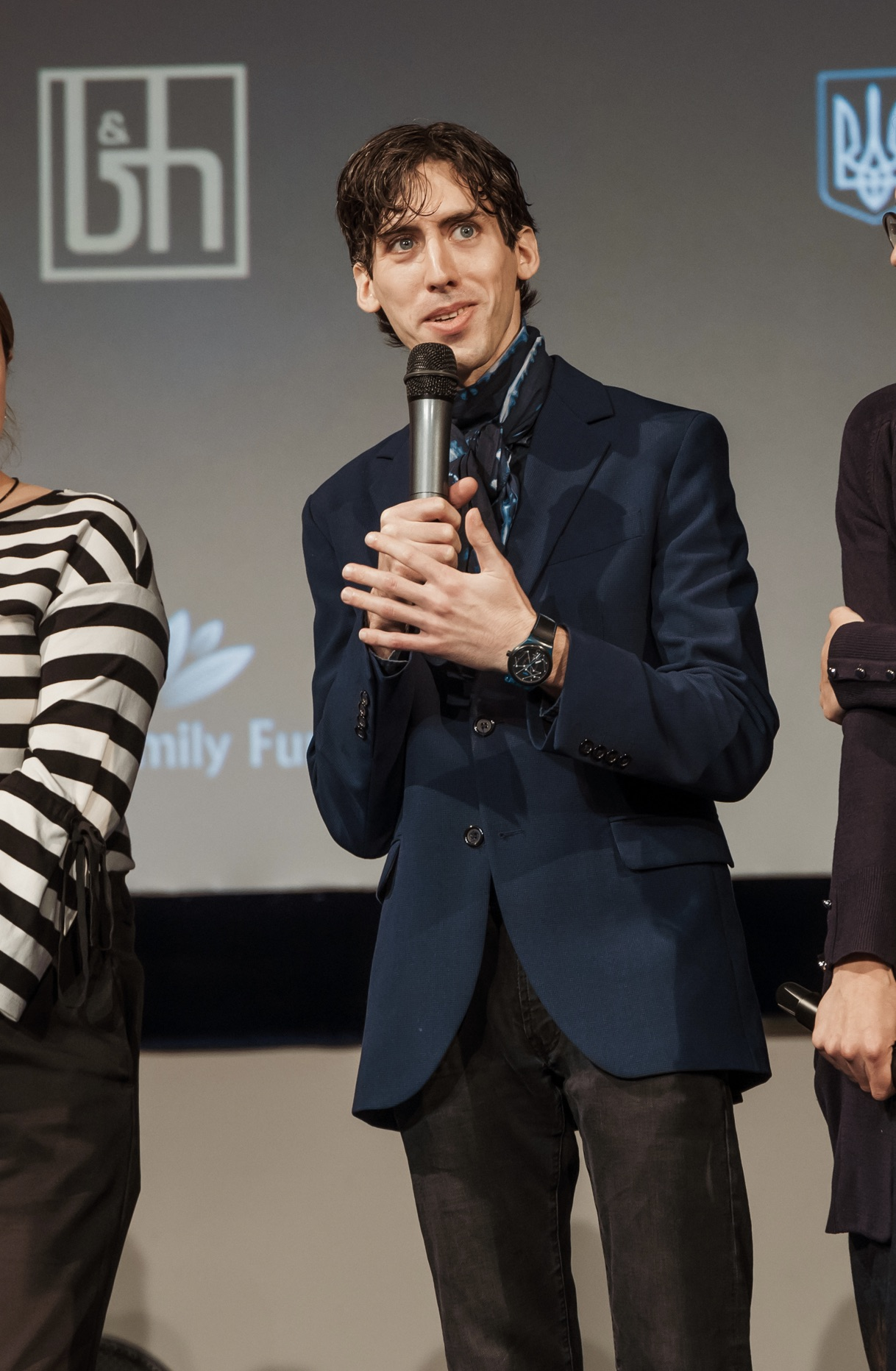
- Moshe Lobel at the theatrical premiere of Shttl in Kyiv, Ukraine.
- Occupation: Actor • director • producer • musician

Moshe Lobel is an American actor, filmmaker and musician. He is best known for starring in the Yiddish-Ukrainian drama Shttl, which premiered at the London Film Festival and in competition at the Rome Film Festival.

Lobel received praise from critics for his breakout performance in Shttl, who called it "masterful" and "captivating." French newspaper Le Figaro writes, "In the role of Mendele, American actor Moshe Lobel is mesmerizing. With remarkable sensitivity, he embodies a man caught between two violently opposing worlds.”

== Early life ==
Lobel was raised in the insular Yiddish-speaking Hasidic community in Borough Park, Brooklyn. At age 12, he began to break away from his Hasidic roots, ultimately leaving the community entirely. He studied psychology at Yeshiva University, but switched his focus to theater, before leaving the school in his second year.

== Career ==
In 2017, Lobel made his Off-Broadway debut as Ralph in New Yiddish Rep's production of Awake and Sing! by Clifford Odets. In 2018, he made his television debut on HBO's High Maintenance. Later that year, he joined the cast of Fiddler on the Roof In Yiddish directed by Joel Grey, and appeared in The Vigil from Blumhouse.

With writer Etai Shuchatowitz, Lobel co-created, directed and starred in Untold Genius, a mockumentary series featuring Jackie Hoffman and Stephen Tobolowsky.

In 2021, he was cast as the lead in Shttl, a Yiddish drama featuring Saul Rubinek. The film depicts the lives of a Jewish shtetl on the eve of Operation Barbarossa. It was filmed in Ukraine six months before the 2022 Russian invasion of Ukraine. The film premiered at the 2022 London Film Festival, and won the Audience Award one week later at the Rome Film Festival.

== Filmography ==
Title	Role	Notes
High Maintenance	Cholent Guest	
The Vigil	Lazer	
Untold Genius	Adam Goldberg	Also director and producer
Leibniz's Law	Co-director, producer	Post-production
Shttl	Mendele	Winner: Audience Award at the 2022 Rome Film Festival
