= Rossiya Theatre =

Cinema and music venue in Moscow, Russia

- «Karo Film Pushkinsky» Cinema (1997–2012) «Rossiya» Cinema (1961–1997)
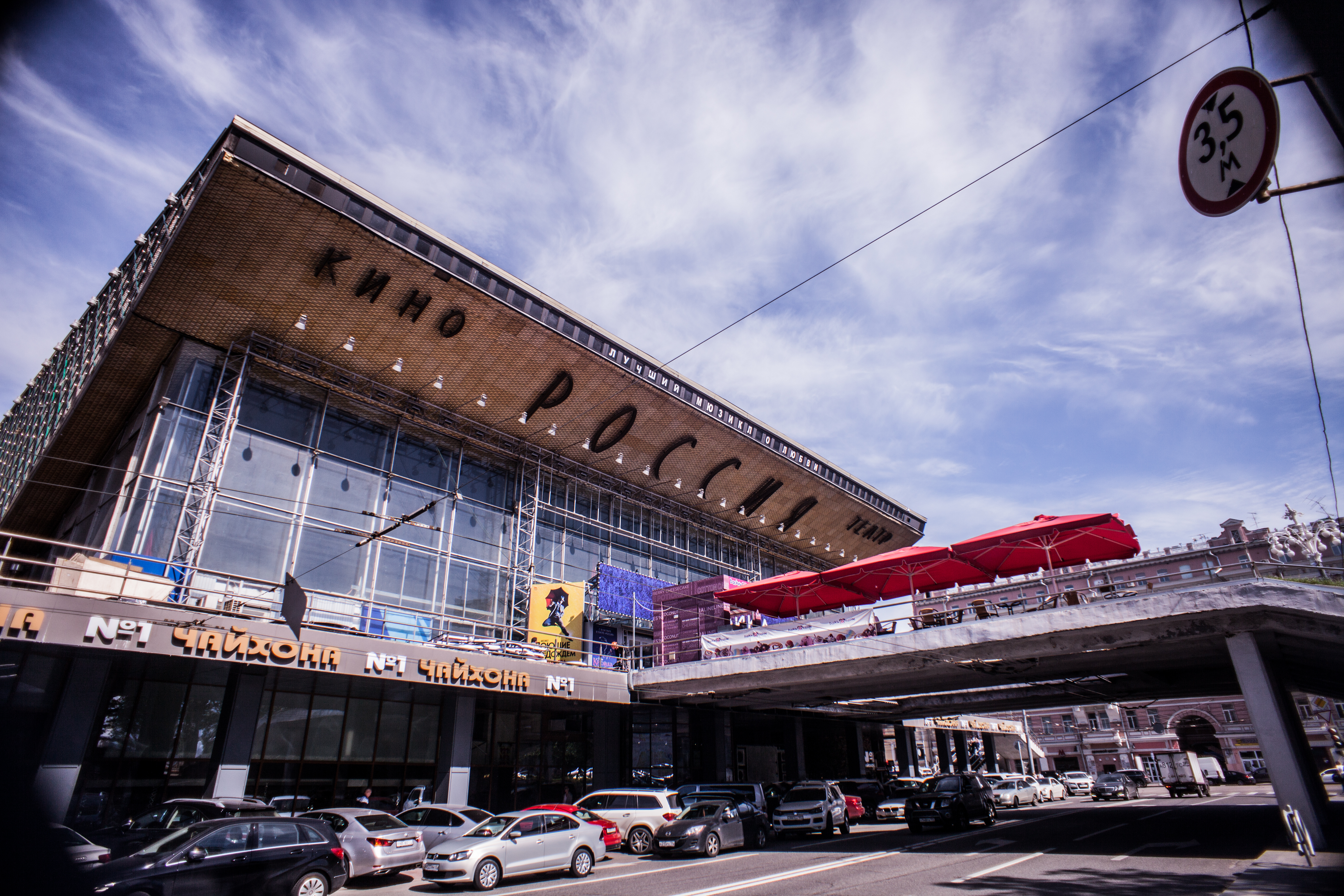
- Pushkinsky Cinema Theatre, 2015
- Interactive map of Rossiya Theatre
- Address: Moscow; Russia
- Coordinates: 55.766111°N 37.6075°E
- Owner: Karo Film
- Capacity: 1750 (2056 when it was a cinema hall)
- Designation: Monument of architecture
- Production: Beauty and the Beast (musical) (revival)

Construction
- Opened: 1961
- Reopened: 2012
- Rebuilt: 1997, 2012

Tenant
- Stage Entertainment

Website
- http://www.stage-musical.ru/rossiya

The Rossiya Theatre (Russian: Театр «Россия»), formerly known as the Pushkinsky Cinema (Russian: Кинотеатр «Пушкинский») is monument of architecture and currently the largest theatre in Moscow operated by Stage Entertainment. It is located in Pushkinskaya Square.

== History ==
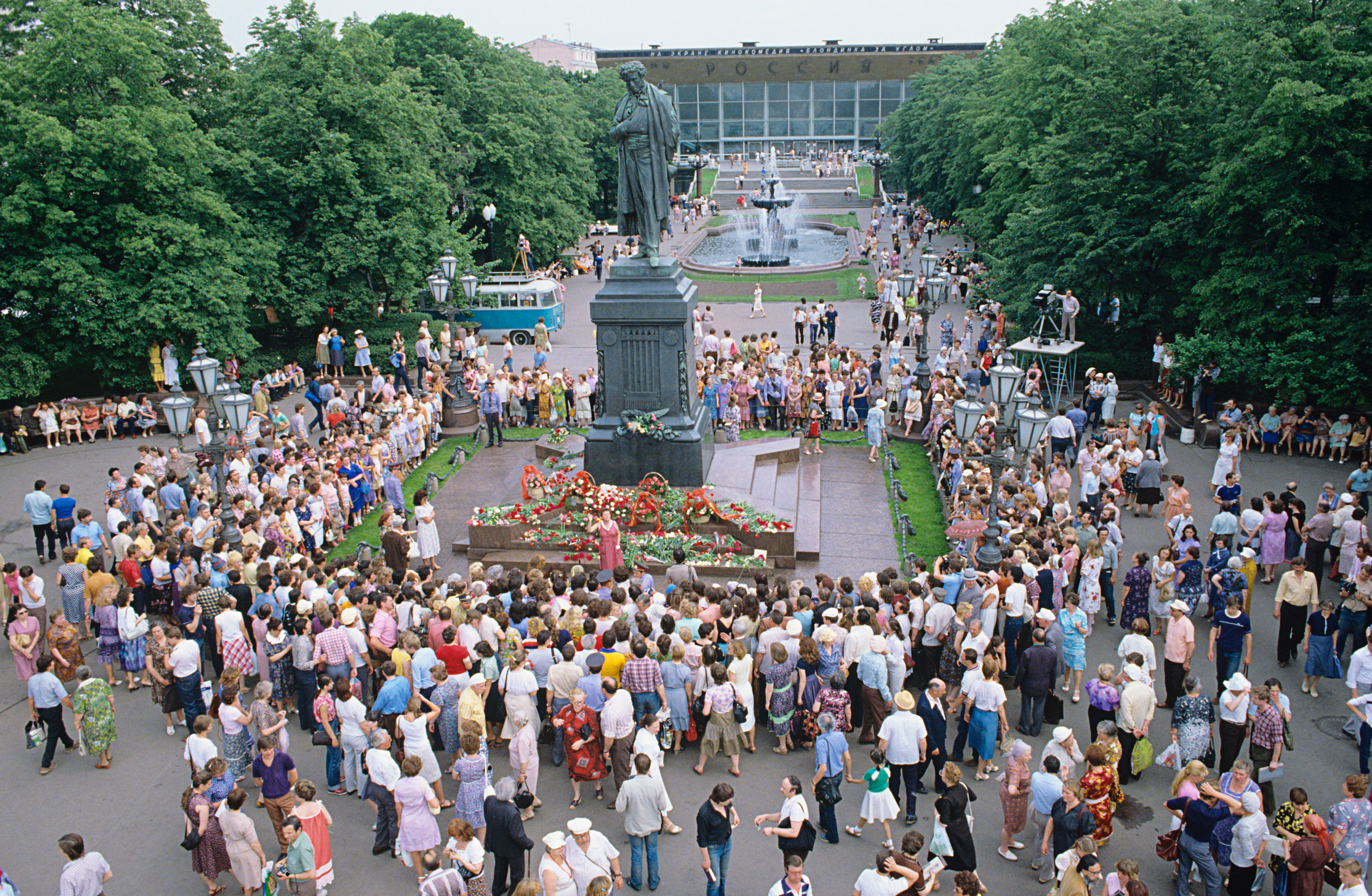
A poetry festival near the most famous Pushkin Monument on Pushkinskaya Square in 1984. Rossiya Cinema can be seen in the background.

The Rossiya Cinema was built in 1961. In 1997, The Rossiya was leased (and then eventually sold) to the film distributor Karo Film, which renovated the theatre and changed its name to Pushkinsky. The Pushkinsky was leased in 2012 to Stage Entertainment Russia for five years.

== Productions ==
- 2012-2014: The Little Mermaid (Russian premiering, 503 perf)
- 2014: Chicago (16 perf, Continuation of the original revival premiering on October 5, 2013, in MDM Theatre)
- 2014-2015: Beauty and the Beast (revival, 245 perf)
- 2015-2016: Singin' in the Rain (Russian premiering, Currently playing)
- 2016-2017: Cinderella (European premiering, Coming soon)

== See also ==
- Pushkinskaya Square
- Tverskaya Street
- MDM Theater (also operated by Stage Entertainment)
