= Nobody Wins =

Nobody Wins may refer to:

- "Nobody Wins" (Radney Foster song)
- "Nobody Wins" (Kris Kristofferson song)
- "Nobody Wins," a single from The Fox (Elton John album)
