= LGBTQ music =

Music about gender and sexual minorities

- Stylistic origins: Ideologically; Lesbian, Gay, Bisexual, Transgender, and Queer topics • protest songs • gay anthems Musically; Various influences
- Cultural origins: 1970s, United Kingdom and United States
- Derivative forms: Musical genres Disco, glam rock, homo hop (hip-hop), house (diva house, hardbag), hyperpop, queercore Dance styles Jacking, vogue, waacking

Other topics
- Ball culture, Circuit party, Gay bar (Lesbian bar), Women's music

Lesbian, gay, bisexual, transgender, and queer (LGBTQ) music is music that focuses on the experiences of gender and sexual minorities as a product of the broad gay liberation movement.

LGBTQ music spans the entire spectrum of popular music. Lyricism and song content typically express the frustration, anxiety, and hope associated with non-normative sexual and gender identities, offering marginalized groups a vital platform for expression. Recently, popular music has "provided an arena where marginalized voices can be heard and sexual identities shaped, challenged, and renegotiated". Mainstream music has begun to reflect acceptance of LGBTQ musicianship. Some queer icons are openly queer-identifying and have made impactful changes in the world for LGBTQ people. Others are straight allies that have expressed their support for the community.

LGBTQ music can also refer to music that does not necessarily engage with queer themes, or is created by queer composers/producers, but is enjoyed by members of the LGBTQ community regardless. Much of the music created by straight queer icons is enjoyed in LGBTQ spaces, with artists such as Judy Garland, Céline Dion, Janet Jackson, Donna Summer, Kylie Minogue, Madonna, or Cher, among others. Some performers, like Elton John and Lady Gaga, are prominent activists for the LGBTQ community, winning the GLAAD Vanguard Award in 2019, and publicly thanked the LGBTQ community for their development of the house music genre at the 2023 Grammy Awards.

== History ==
German sexologists around the turn of the 20th century indirectly revealed that homosexuals were abundant in the music field and profession. The associated taboos regarding homosexuality and the large amount of homosexuals in music at this time led to the development of the idea of music being a method for expression, transcending ordinary life.

Early Black queer artists included Ma Rainey and Bessie Smith, who recorded overtly lesbian songs in the 1920s, as well as Little Richard in the late 1950s, with the hit song "Tutti Frutti" as a homosexual reference, but one that was covert enough to be plausibly denied.

Regarding classical music, American composer Leonard Bernstein had many homosexual relations, often with other musicians and composers, despite being in a heterosexual marriage. Many artists like Bernstein, Stephen Sondheim, Jerome Robbins, Dimitri Mitropoulos were subject to hiding their sexual identities from the public. American pianist Liberace was famously closeted and vehemently denied allegations of homosexuality until his death in 1987, suing a Daily Mirror columnist for insinuating his sexuality. While the entertainment industry now more openly discusses the role of gender identity both in the press and within music compositions, there is still reticence for many in the business to advocate for LGBTQ acceptance.

== Broadway and musical theater ==
Broadway and musical theater have been ways for groups of people to express themselves through music, dance, and drama. As Philip Brett and Elizabeth Wood state, "the musical theater has been a special place for gay identification and expression". Many queer people, but particularly gay men, are not only enjoyers of Broadway, but often have a hand in the production and creation of it. Notable gay men involved in the production of Broadway shows include Cole Porter, Lorenz Hart, Noël Coward, Marc Blitzstein, Arthur Laurents, Leonard Bernstein, Jerome Robbins, and Stephen Sondheim, to name a few. Lesbians also have a hand in contributing to the production of Broadway and theater, like lesbian producer Cheryl Crawford. With this impact from homosexual producers, musical theater was rife with coded messages for homosexual artists early on, moving on to having openly gay themes with musicals such as Cabaret and A Chorus Line in the 1960s and 1970s. Musicals began to focus on the HIV/AIDS crisis in the 1990s, most popularly with Falsettoland and RENT. Other musicals with openly trans characters were also popular, including The Rocky Horror Picture Show and Hedwig and the Angry Inch. Musicals focused on drag or drag queens are also popular still today, such as Kinky Boots.

== Timeline ==
=== 1920s-1930s ===
Blues music made its appearance in the United States towards the late 19th century, but made an impact on queer culture in the 1920s and 1930s. Following the Civil War period, blues music relied heavily on Black vocals. Specifically, Black women who were originally introduced to the entertainment scene due to the influx of economic opportunities. Blues were a way of expression for freed African Americans, "Ma Rainey's Black Bottom is, simultaneously, a story about how white people 'tore the railroad down' and how Black people still managed to 'build a railroad of their own' within its interests". Becoming entertainers also brought black women bodily and sexual control over themselves and gave them opportunities to express their desires for same-sex relationships. Due to the time period, blues musicians such as Ma Rainey, Gladys Bentley, and Bessie Smith had to keep these relationships hidden but because of the constant nature of moving the involvement they had with same-sex relationships was a lot easier to contain. Despite many of these musicians being married to men, they still sought relationships with other women.

During the 1920s-1930s era, blues music was solely vocals-driven due to lack of variety in materials and instruments. This led to women in the blues industry often having raspy and husky voices that were meant to carry throughout a venue. Ma Rainey was met with controversies regarding her masculine voice. Her southern audience found her vocals to be appealing and nostalgic towards their southern history, but her voice was not enjoyed by her northern audience. Despite the difference in enjoyment, Rainey stuck to her roots and chose to carry on with her natural masculine voice instead of conforming to the swing style that came with northern enjoyment.

Blues music in this time period not only came with a deep background in queer themes, but additionally was built on expressions of anger and rage. Musicians such as Bessie Smith and Ma Rainey channeled rage towards cisnormativity, racism towards black women in the interwar period, and sexism in their music. The music serves as a vessel for expression in which these women discussed sexuality and same-sex relationships within their lyrics, since they could not publicly speak out or be seen with another woman. These lyrics were analyzed and seen for what they were intended to exert by certain people at the time, but have been further analyzed by the public in more recent times.

Blues musicians such as Gladys Bentley and Ma Rainey were known to border the line of acceptable female behavior in this time period. They often dressed more masculine than what was deemed respectable and acceptable. Their physical appearance challenged the ideal expression of femininity and actively challenged patriarchal concepts put in place.

Their lyrics were a direct connection to their physical display. Famously, Ma Rainey's “Prove It On Me Blues” openly addresses her sexual fluidity and desire towards same-sex relationships. Smith and Bentley similarly have lyrics discussing same-sex relationships.

=== 1960s-1970s ===
Beginning in Europe and making their way over to America, discothèques were dance clubs where prerecorded music, rather than live music, was the main focus. Originating from France and Germany during World War II, where young people met in basements to dance to American swing music, as the Nazis had banned jazz, bebop music, and jitterbug dancing, the concept and culture of disco made its way to the United States by the late 1960s and early 1970s. African Americans, gays, and Latinos who were longing for something other than the rock music met in these clubs, in cities like New York, Philadelphia, and Miami. In these clubs, "disco became the pulse of gay liberation on and off the dance floor in the post-Stonewall, pre-AIDS 1970s". In later years, the mass popularity and integration of this counter-culture into the mainstream culture reflected "yet another infusion of homosexual subculture into the cultural mainstream".

The sexual revolution and associated revolutions of the 1960s started to bring counterculture to the mainstream attention, allowing for women, Black people, and LGBTQ minorities to be recognized and treated as human beings. In these revolutions, gender and sexuality became less rigid and more fluid, as evidenced in the performances of musicians like Freddie Mercury, David Bowie, Grace Jones, and Prince.

The disco, glam rock, and industrial music cultures offered a multitude of platforms for expression for gender and sexual non-conforming individuals throughout the 1970s. For the queer community, disco was a bridge between all people from all backgrounds through an expression of the body. Disco was not only musical, but cultural as well, and allowed people to form communities. "Disco Pluralism" partly led to the inclusion of different perspectives in the genre, thus creating a category of music representative of the intersectional identities of queer listeners; such as race or socioeconomic status.

Disco remained practically exclusive to underground clubs for a majority of the decade until, in 1977, the movie Saturday Night Fever propelled disco into the mainstream. After the movie's success, disco netted around 4–8 billion dollars and averaged from 20 to 40 percent of interactions on the billboard (1979).

Though disco's foundation lies in inclusivity after the success of Saturday Night Fever its commercial success led to the genre shifting from predominantly black and queer people to white Americans securing a spot for them in the genre's sphere. The influx of upper-middle class white Americans finding success in disco led to several queer people showing animosity towards the genre, believing its capitalistic success tore disco away from what made it culturally revolutionary.

Disco still remained popular in the queer community even with increased criticism on how it derived its success. Authors like Richard Dyer of The Gay Left were able to publish literature in support of disco that the queer community could rally behind.

In scholarship about disco and related genres, most scholarship focuses on white, gay men who were involved in disco, sometimes briefly mentioning "Disco Divas", or the Black women who were involved disco music. Even though disco was instrumental in forming different ways of viewing marginalized identities, specifically femininity, Blackness, and homosexuality, most scholarship focuses on the least marginalized of these groups when conducting research.

Disco was not the only popular element of LGBTQ music in the 1970s; following Stonewall, there was an emergence of lesbian, feminist, and women-identified singer-songwriters. Events such as women-only music festivals and women-only coffeehouses promoted this music, and many of these spaces were feminist separatism or lesbian separatism spaces. Though not occurring in the 1970s, one of the most famous women's music festivals came into controversy in the 1990s, when trans woman Nancy Jean Burkholder was asked to leave the festival. The festival cited their "womyn-born womyn" policy regarding this decision, and was met with much controversy in the following years.

The glam rock scene included numerous bisexual musicians, including Queen's Freddie Mercury, Elton John, and David Bowie. Medium's Claudia Perry felt that "Glam rock was a queer paradise of sorts. Watching Mick Ronson and Bowie frolic onstage gave hope to every queer kid in the world. John's flamboyancy was also of great comfort. Marc Bolan of T. Rex is still the subject of speculation (a friend who worked at Creem remembers him coming on to just about everyone when he came through Detroit, but this clearly isn't definitive)." Glam also rock helped to normalize androgynous fashion. Tim Bowers of The New York Times recalls that "glam's vocals had a fruity theatricality, supporting lyrics that presented as a boast: "Your mother can't tell if you're a boy or a girl." Glam was butch and femme at once: bisexuality in sound." Jobriath, rock's first openly gay star, was also part of the glam rock scene.

The Rocky Horror Show, a 1973 play that was later adapted into the film The Rocky Horror Picture Show, was a keystone of LGBTQ media in the 1970s and was soundtracked primarily by glam rock. The play was noted to help popularize the genre. A song from the show, "Sweet Transvestite", was noted as "the first big, glam rock aria of the musical" in the book Trans Representations in Contemporary, Popular Cinema. The same book mentions that glam rock "was a queering (or camping) of the genre of rock music"

The musical Hedwig and the Angry Inch from 2001 also used glam rock to tell the story of a gender-affirming surgery gone awry.

=== 1980s ===
The 1980s saw increased exposure to LGBTQ culture in bands, namely gender bending and cross-dressing, in the music industry with artists such as Culture Club, The B-52s, Soft Cell, Visage, Frankie Goes to Hollywood, Pet Shop Boys, Dead or Alive, Erasure, and drag queen Divine.

There was a large queer community that existed in electronic and dance music during the 80s. These genres of music were often played in underground queer clubs in many cities such as Los Angeles and New York and New Romantic subcultural movement of the late 1970s and early 1980s, which spawned the Blitz Kids in London.

Music videos began to allude to LGBTQ relationships, which included Bronski Beat's "Smalltown Boy", Elton John' "Elton's Song", Frankie Goes to Hollywood "Relax" and Madonna's "Vogue".

Gay icons during this decade included Cyndi Lauper, Grace Jones, Morrissey, George Michael, Loleatta Holloway, Douglas Pearce, Whitney Houston, Bob Mould, Melissa Etheridge and Judas Priest frontman Rob Halford.

Disco culture of the 70s and 80s is directly associated with queer musicians. Sexual and gender fluidity had become increasingly visible, leading to artists such as David Bowie, Freddie Mercury, and Prince to exist in unique ways that push the boundaries of gender and sexuality. Bowie's 1979 music video for "Boys Keep Swinging" offers an influential example of androgyny in music. In this video, Bowie wears traditionally masculine attire, depicting himself as exceptionally macho while portraying himself as expressionless. He continues a deadpan tone in the video by monotonously singing about advantages men experience derived from the patriarchy ("you can wear a uniform", "learn to drive and everything", and "Life is a pop of the cherry when you're a boy"). The constant dull tone of the video creates a sense of irony, reinforced by the camera cutting to Bowie in drag which further confuses the viewer on Bowie's gender identity. At the end of the video on three occasions Bowie walks down a runway in drag, at the very end he wipes off bright red lipstick on his arm, representing his discomfort with female identity along with its male counterpart. The ambiguity and fluidity of these artists helped to create a safe space for queer people.

Also popular within the LGBTQ community was post-disco dance music such as Eurodisco, Italo disco, house music, Hi-NRG, and freestyle. During the 1980s, this music became more prevalent in the United States, and LGBTQ artists gained prominence. DJ Larry Levan started his DJ career at the gay disco Paradise Garage.

In Argentina, new wave band Virus, led by singer Federico Moura, made references to 1980s gay men culture, such as cruising for sex, male prostitution and underground parties; and Moura displayed a flamboyant, sexualized stage persona that caused a homophobic reaction by much of the Argentine rock culture at the time. In the decade the career of several non-heterosexual women also took off, including Marilina Ross, Sandra Mihanovich and Celeste Carballo. Ross wrote the lesbian anthem "Puerto Pollensa", which was popularized by Mihanovich in 1981–1982. In 1984, Mihanovich recorded a Spanish-language version of "I Am What I Am" titled "Soy lo que soy", which also became a popular gay anthem in Argentina. Mihanovich and Carballo later joined as a pop duo and released the album Somos mucho más que dos in 1988.

=== 1990s ===
Blur's 1994 single "Girls & Boys" was a hit that explored themes of androgyny and pansexuality. Lesbian musician Melissa Etheridge used the success of her song "Come to My Window", popular among lesbian crowds, to campaign for same-sex unions and LGBTQ parental rights.

In 1990, Argentine singers Sandra Mihanovich and Celeste Carballo (who were also a romantic couple) released their second and final studio album as a pop duo, Mujer contra mujer. The record is celebrated as a landmark in lesbian visibility in Argentina and has become a symbol for the local LGBTQ community.

An increase in pro-LGBTQ laws and artists condemning homophobia in their music populated much of the 1990s. Groups such as Placebo, Alcazar, Right Said Fred, Maná, and more joined the ranks of allies and LGBTQ musicians. Bands such as Pansy Division and Tribe 8 led the queercore offshoot of hardcore punk that helped solidify LGBTQ arts in the decade. Robby Reverb, a member of gay punk band mOral SeX recorded rock and country music as well, including "Accept It", written by gay poet Drew Blood.

=== 2000s ===
The 2000s saw LGBTQ music branch off into its own genre, and new artists like Lady Gaga, Christina Aguilera, Will Young, Scissor Sisters, The Gossip, RuPaul, Mika, Dario, Adam Lambert, Lauren Jauregui, Sakima, Dawnstar, Neon Trees, and Miley Cyrus supported a growing industry, spreading the message of equality and positivity.

Hip Hop became an increasingly queer influenced industry. Though many performers were still adjusting to the appeal of mainstream markets, queer hip hop artists were still prevalent. They became more of a singular exception to the industry. Hurricane Katrina took life and excitement out of many parts in the south, but the return and rise of sissy rappers, open and out queer bounce rappers specifically in New Orleans, brought back excitement and joy through live performances of queer hip hop.

=== 2010s ===
Country singer Chely Wright faced death threats and declining record sales after coming out in 2010. She made Wish Me Away, a documentary about her experience, and it won several major awards in 2012 including trophies from the Los Angeles Film Festival, the Seattle LGBT Festival and the Tallgrass Film Festival. In 2012, a singer and guitarist from the group Against Me! came out as a trans woman and changed her name to Laura Jane Grace. Openly gay artists such as Tegan and Sara gained popularity; the duo produced a pro-tolerance advert jingle for Oreo in 2014.

Social media platforms like YouTube, Tumblr, and Instagram established new ways for queer artists to share their music. These sites allow artists to upload the music on their own without the need of a music label. Music labels can sometimes prevent artists from releasing music that details their queer experience. In 2013, a year before releasing his debut EP TRXYE, Troye Sivan released a coming out video on his YouTube channel. This video allowed Sivan to share his identity without risking his budding music career. Since then, Sivan had achieved great success and has established himself as a prominent artist in queer music. For many decades, queer artists have been told that if they come out, their careers will be over. The self-publishing features of social media have allowed queer artists to share their music while also being open about their identities without having to risk their careers.

In 2018, Spotify published its official Bedroom Pop playlist, which helped bring attention to emerging indie artists with queer fanbases. artists such as Clairo, Cavetown, Girl In Red, and Steve Lacy received viral mainstream popularity through TikTok and SoundCloud. The DIY ethos of the genre helped LGBTQ+ singers establish online communities and shaped the sound of 2020's indie pop. Another emerging scene during this time was hyperpop and experimental dance music on SoundCloud. Artists like Ayesha Erotica, Laura Les, Osquinn, That Kid, Underscores, and Jane Remover saw viral popularity during the 2020s. The popularity of Alt TikTok helped bring transgender musicians into mainstream music discussions among Gen Z and Gen Alpha.

=== 2020s ===
In recent years there has been an increase in country musicians living out their queer identities publicly. Some may see this as the biggest change in the music industry, due to the fact that country artists in the past have mostly been white, straight men. As of today, some of the top artists are openly queer country musicians. For example, Lil Nas X became a sensation when he released his country rap "Old Town Road" that went viral on the short-form video app TikTok. Since becoming famous, Lil Nas X has used his platform to elevate gay representation, and has carved out space for himself in the music industry as an unapologetic messiah for today's young, queer generation. This increase in representation in the country music industry has brought other names to the scene. Country music now has Trixie Mattel, American drag queen and musician, as well as Orville Peck, South African country musician as breakthrough artists in this music genre that may not have previously accepted them. Alongside these openly queer country musicians, there has also been a larger number of country artists supporting the LGBTQ community. Artists like Garth Brooks, Carrie Underwood, Tim McGraw, Kacey Musgraves, and Maren Morris have come forward as allies for this community.

In recent years, the political landscape in many countries has changed in respect to queer identities. A driving factor of this shift is queer artists who use their music and platforms to continue to advocate for queer rights. Many successful artists have achieved great success by disrupting gender and sexual norms. Artists such as Prince, David Bowie, Cher, and Madonna have incorporated gender-bending into their music and performances to blur the lines between classical ideas of gender and sexuality in the performing arts.

LGBTQ music has become more widespread, with more queer artists releasing music detailing queer experience. Queer artists share their personal experiences through their music, which has helped to create spaces in the music industry for LGBTQ listeners to feel heard – and with which to identify themselves.

== LGBTQ artists ==
Popular music has always included LGBTQ artists and increasing social tolerance of the late 20th and early 21st centuries has allowed more such artists to come out publicly. Early examples of this arose with the sexual liberation movement, with artists such as Sylvester, Tom Robinson, Janis Ian, Boy George, and others.

Many openly LGBTQ musicians have become successful. Elton John, for example, achieved the best-selling single in Billboard of the 1990s ("Candle in the Wind 1997"), staying at #1 for 14 weeks. Will Young released "Anything is Possible"/"Evergreen", and this song was the best-selling single of the decade in the 2000s. Country singer Ty Herndon came out as gay in 2014, after three number one hits on Billboard Hot Country Songs. In the 2010s and 2020s, countless other musicians of various genres, such as Lil Nas X with country music, Sam Smith, Troye Sivan, Hayley Kiyoko, and Chappell Roan with pop music, and girl in red and Dodie with indie music, have reached fame and had their songs reach new heights on Billboard.

== LGBTQ-oriented music ==
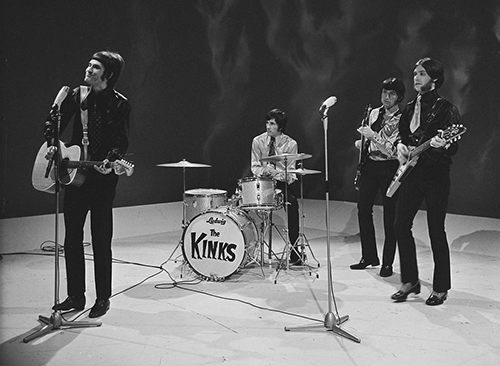
British band The Kinks would allude to both gay and trans people in some of their biggest hit songs.

The Sexual revolution and Origins of rock and roll led to a new openness about sexuality in the rock and pop music of the 1960s. Foremost among this trend was the British band The Kinks, whose following included many figures from London's gay and trans communities. Lead singer and songwriter, Ray Davies confirmed to journalists that the band's 1965 hit "See My Friends" was about homosexuality, being unsure of his identity in his youth and that he once told his wife, "If it wasn't for you, I'd be queer". Two years later the band recorded "David Watts", about a gay school friend of Davies who he admired. The song alluded to Watts sexuality with lines such as "he is so gay and fancy free" and "all the girls in the neighbourhood try to go out with David Watts, but can't succeed", with Davies again publicly confirming to journalists the homosexual nature of the song. The Kinks most prominent LGBTQ song was their 1970 single "Lola". A hit on both the UK Singles Chart and the American Billboard Hot 100, while Davies and fellow Kinks member, Mick Avory had frequented London's transsexual pubs, the song makes explicit reference to a Cross-dresser (named as Lola in the song) who Davies had witnessed dancing one evening with the band's manager. The song's subject matter was notably more explicit than the Kinks earlier LGBTQ songs, confirming Lola's biological sex with the line "I'm glad I'm a man and so's Lola". This led to the song being viewed as controversial, with press outrage, radio stations banning the song and others insisting the song be edited or faded out before Lola's biological sex was revealed. Davies again publicly addressed the subject matter, stating, "It really doesn't matter what sex Lola is, I think she's all right".

Another of the earliest US top 40 singles to feature a positive depiction of the LGBTQ community was bisexual rocker Lou Reed's 1972 song "Walk on the Wild Side", which detailed the lives of gay, bi, and trans members of Andy Warhol's social circle. David Bowie also brought attention to non-heteronormative situations with hits such as "Rebel Rebel". Tom Robinson's 1978 hit "Glad to Be Gay" became a punk anthem as it called out the UK's mistreatment of its gay citizens.

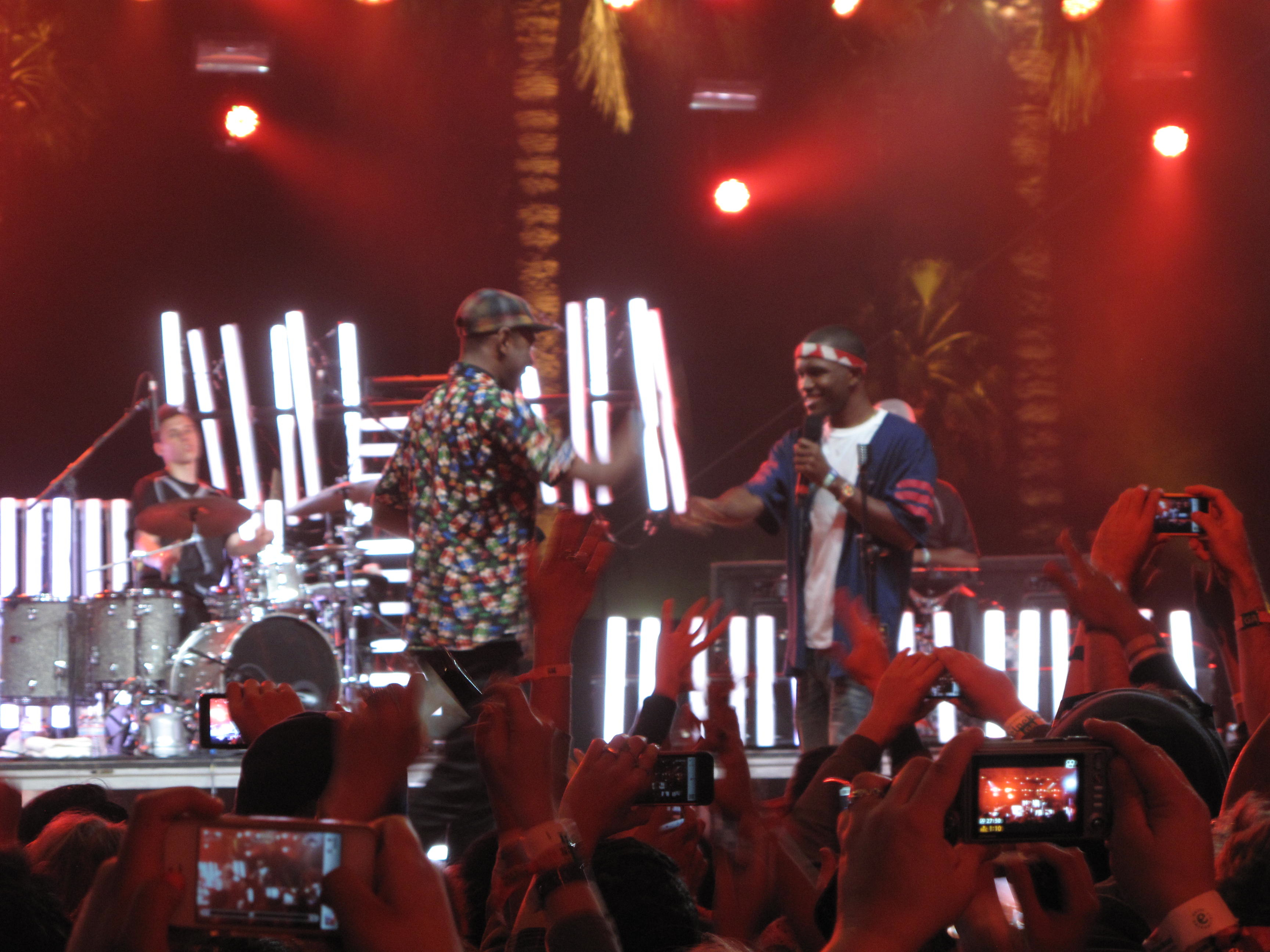
Tyler the Creator and Frank Ocean at Coachella in 2012

In the past, music videos had been used as a way to depict LGBTQ relationships. The video for "Elton's Song" by Elton John, though lyrically genderless, depicts a schoolboy with a crush on an older boy. Elton John told Rolling Stone that it was "the first gay song that I actually recorded as a homosexual song." The theme of gay love of a gay schoolboy caused a controversy, inspiring such tabloid headlines as "Elton's gay video shocker". Other even when the lyrics of the music didn't explicitly discuss them, as in Physical by Olivia Newton-John features Newton-John in a tight leotard trying to make several overweight men lose weight. The men fail comically and Newton-John leaves the room to take a shower. When the men work out on their own, they suddenly transform into muscular, attractive men. Newton-John is shocked when she returns and starts to flirt with them. Two of the men secretly go out, holding hands, implying they are gay. This surprises Newton-John, as does the sight of two more of the men leaving with their arms around each other and Madonna's music video for her song "Vogue". They have since been used to express artists' sexuality.

The lyrics of songs have also been used by LGBTQ artists as a tool to express their identification. Frank Ocean's 2012 album Channel Orange has romantic songs that use male pronouns when describing his love interest. Hayley Kiyoko, nicknamed "Lesbian Jesus" by her fans, made her sexual orientation clear to the public with the release of her 2015 song "Girls Like Girls". In 2016, FLETCHER's music video for her song "Wasted Youth" presents herself with a female love interest. In April 2018, Janelle Monáe came out as pansexual with her album Dirty Computer, and released the song "Make Me Feel"; the music video detailing a woman's attraction to two club goers. LGBTQ relationships have also been depicted in the music videos of straight musicians, further solidifying their positions as queer allies. Carly Rae Jepsen's music video for "Call Me Maybe" features gay male characters, In 2017, YouTuber and singer-songwriter Dodie Clark released her song "I'm Bisexual - A Coming Out Song" to announce to her fan base that she was bi.

Straight and cisgender allies have also produced LGBT-oriented music. Country artist Phil Vassar released the song "Bobbi with an I" in 2009, which uses a humorous narrative to encourage acceptance of transgender individuals. Singer-songwriter Hozier released the song "Take Me to Church", whose music video partially focused on religion-based homophobia. "1-800-273-8255", a song performed by Logic and Alessia Cara, dealt with homophobia and the pain that it results in. Macklemore & Ryan Lewis teamed up with Mary Lambert to make "Same Love", a song about same sex marriage that focused on the message that love conquers all. The music video for Avicii's single "Silhouettes" depicts a person undergoing sex reassignment surgery.

Some artists who were perceived to be straight when they released songs depicting female bisexuality have been criticized by openly LGBTQ artists for their depiction of bisexual women. Katy Perry's 2008 song "I Kissed a Girl" and Rita Ora's 2018 song "Girls" both explore female same-sex relationships, but they have been accused of being "tone-deaf" to the needs of the LGBTQ community. Perry's song was criticized for its use of queerbaiting. The song has been criticized for suggesting that queerness is an "experimental phase", which is inaccurate for a majority of LGBTQ people. The music video for "I Kissed a Girl" employs the fetishization of bisexual women through Perry's risqué behaviour throughout the video which leads to the objectification of queer women. Both songs have been reassessed in recent years, as Rita Ora and Katy Perry both did not identify as straight; nevertheless, Perry has been openly embraced by many in the LGBTQ community, and she subsequently identified as being sexually fluid. Ora has acknowledged and understood that "people looked at it, because they didn't know about [her] experience, like [she] was using the culture", and said that the period following the criticism was "pretty dark". Perry has said her portrayal of bisexuality in the song is dated and that because she feels that "we've really changed, conversationally, in the past 10 years" and that "Bisexuality wasn't as talked about back then, or any type of fluidity." However, she doesn't believe that the song would have a place in today's pop landscape and has said, "If [she] had to write that song again, [she] probably would make an edit on it", because, "Lyrically, it has a couple of stereotypes in it."

Lady Gaga has achieved significant mainstream success and has influenced the music industry by increasing the awareness of queerness in pop music. Gaga's 2011 song "Born This Way" has been called a gay anthem for its message of self-love. With "Born This Way", Gaga was able to promote inclusivity and self-acceptance by celebrating the queer community. The song has helped many queer people to embrace and celebrate their sexualities. Singer and actor Christian Chavez used his song "Libertad" to make a stance for gay rights and sexual freedom. Troye Sivan's music has been highly acclaimed for its authentic feel of gay millennial music experimenting with chill pop and activism such as "Heaven", "Bloom", and "My My My!".

Jess Young brings her pansexuality into her music. Her debut single "Champagne & Caviar" is all about that. The second verse was originally written "the only fire's in her darkness, the way it flickers when she goes down on me", and now it's "he" because her girlfriend at the time liked to be referred to in the male-pronoun, and had been dating a guy when she re-recorded.

== Gay anthems ==
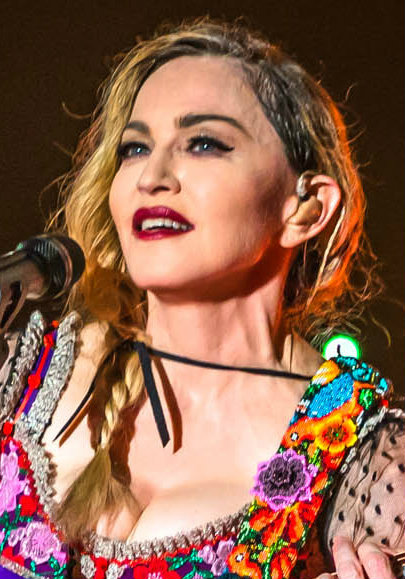
In 2012, the LGBTQ magazine The Advocate named Madonna the greatest gay icon in music.

A gay anthem is a popular song that has become widely popular among, or has become identified with, the gay community. Not all songs labelled as "gay anthems" were written intentionally to become gay anthems, but those that do are often marked by themes of perseverance, inner strength, acceptance, pride, and unity. Research in 2007 suggested that the song most commonly identified as a gay anthem is "I Will Survive" by Gloria Gaynor, and described the song as "a classic emblem of gay culture in the post-Stonewall and AIDS eras".

Other gay anthems include Cher's "Strong Enough", Village People's "Y.M.C.A.", the Weather Girls's "It's Raining Men", Diana Ross's "I'm Coming Out", and ABBA's "Dancing Queen".

=== Themes ===
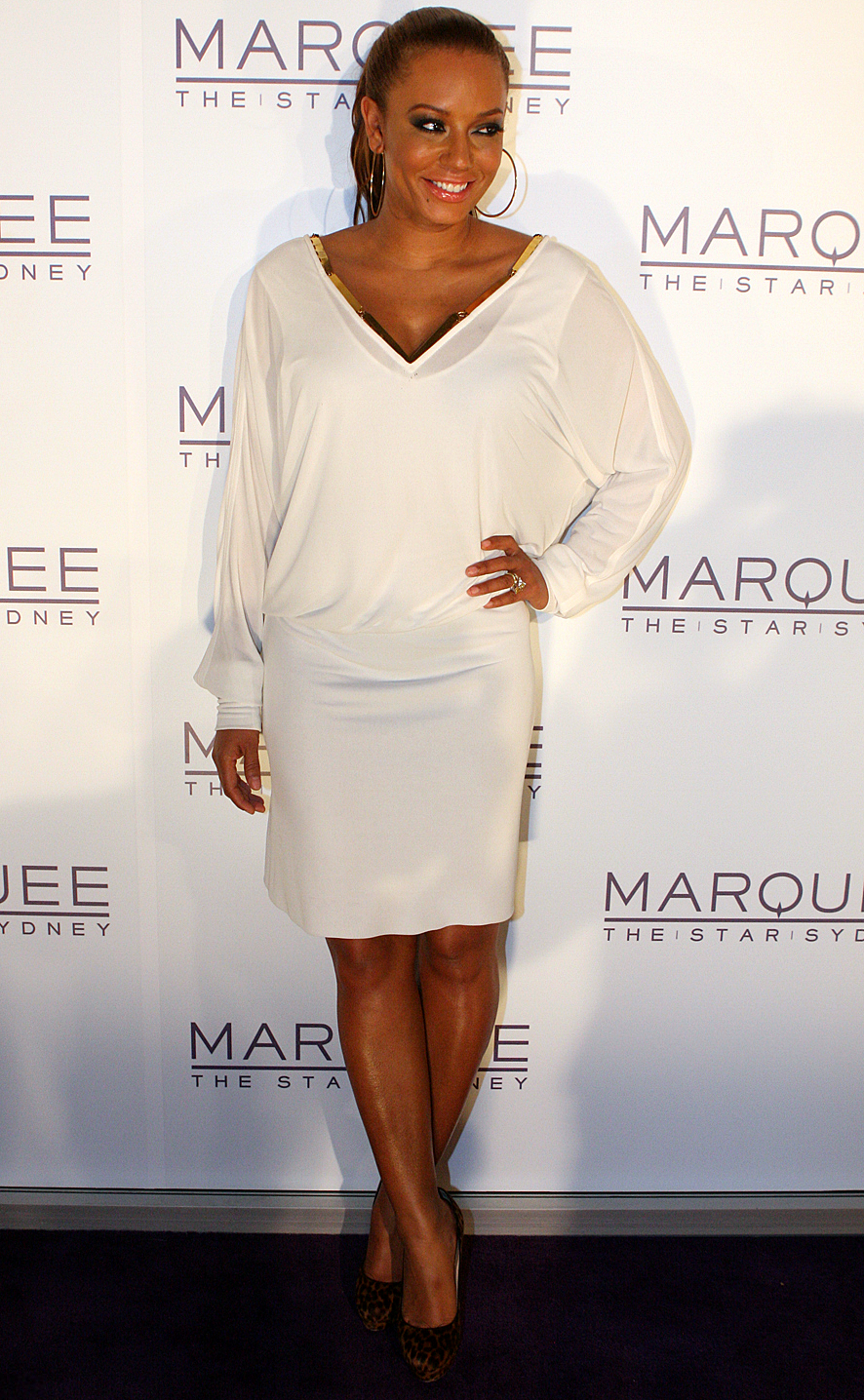
Mel B was shown kissing another woman in her "For Once in My Life" video, making this song a hymn of the gay community.

Although every song is individual, the criteria for what makes a gay anthem has shown a trend among the years. In the 2002 book Queer, the following ten main themes were listed that are common among many, if not all gay anthems:

- Big-voiced divas: Rather than particular to the songs, this area of gay anthems is more akin to a cult of personality of a large gay male following for some particular diva-style pop music vocalists who are almost always female gay icons. For example, Gloria Gaynor and Céline Dion.
- Overcoming hardship in love: Usually a narrative of a wronged lover who comes back stronger than before. For example, "I Will Survive".
- You are not alone: Songs about coming together as a community or reassurance to the lonely that there are others like them out there. For example, "We Are Family".
- Throw your cares away: A carefree narrative about putting your troubles aside and partying. For example, "Holiday".
- Hard-won self-esteem: The theme involves fighting through oppression, darkness, or fear to gain freedom, beauty, or self-esteem. "The Greatest Love of All" as sung by Whitney Houston.
- Celebrating unashamed sexuality: The theme is of transcending cultural shame to celebrate one's sexual nature. For example, "It's Raining Men".
- Search for acceptance: Songs about a welcoming promised land where the dream of acceptance and belonging and hope lives. For example, "Somewhere (There's a Place for Us)" from West Side Story.
- Torch song for the world weary: A narrative about being used, abused, and surviving to tell the tale of lament. For example, "Maybe This Time".
- Love conquers all: Tales of not giving up on love despite seemingly insurmountable odds.
- No apologies: The theme revolves around defiantly living one's life despite what others may want. For example, "I'm Coming Out".

=== Sources of gay anthems ===
Through the first decade of the 21st century, chart-topping popular songs became a "refuge of unambiguous support for gay rights" in a time when legal support for LGBTQ rights in the US was lagging. Even before its single release, Lady Gaga's "Born This Way" was predicted by Elton John to replace Gloria Gaynor's classic gay anthem "I Will Survive". UK LGBTQ rights charity Stonewall named Christina Aguilera's "Beautiful" the most empowering song of the 2000s decade for LGBTQ people.

== OUTMusic Awards ==
Since 2001, the American OUTMusic Awards program has functioned as an annual LGBTQ awards ceremony that mirrors the Grammys. OUTMusic Inc., a 501(c)(3) organization founded in 1990 by Michael Biello & Dan Martin, was re-founded as the LGBT Academy of Recording Arts by Diedra Meredith in 2007. The awards are to recognize some of the LGBTQ artists who have made significant contributions to the music industry.

== See also ==
- Gay skinhead
- LGBTQ
- LGBTQ community
- LGBTQ culture
- LGBTQ marketing
- LGBTQ representation in hip-hop
- LGBTQ representation in jazz
- LGBTQ symbols
- List of gay anthems
- Queercore
- Stop Murder Music
