= Nobody Wins (Elton John song) =

Single by Elton John

from the album The Fox
- B-side: "Fools in Fashion"
- Released: April 1981
- Genre: Eurobeat; techno-pop
- Length: 3:42
- Label: The Rocket Record Company; Geffen (US)
- Songwriter(s): Jean Paul Dréau; Gary Osborne
- Producer(s): Chris Thomas

Elton John UK singles chronology
| "I Saw Her Standing There" (1981) | "Nobody Wins" (1981) | "Just Like Belgium" (1981) |

Elton John US singles chronology
| "Sartorial Eloquence (Don't Ya Wanna Play This Game No More?)" (1980) | "Nobody Wins" (1981) | "Chloe" (1981) |

"Nobody Wins" is a song recorded by British musician Elton John, written by Jean Paul Dréau and Gary Osborne. It was released in April 1981 as the lead single from John's fifteenth studio album The Fox. The song was John's first single to be produced by Chris Thomas, who would go on to collaborate with him frequently throughout the 1980s and 1990s. The music for "Nobody Wins" is derived from a song entitled "J'Veux d'la Tendresse", composed by Jean Paul Dréau and performed by Janic Prévost, which John had heard while in France in the summer of 1980. Its lyrics were translated from French and altered by Osborne to revolve around themes of struggling relationships which echoed John's own troubled upbringing.

Upon its release, "Nobody Wins" was only moderately successful in the US, where it reached the top 25, and even less so in the UK, where it failed to make the top 40. In France, a version of the song with the original French lyrics kept intact (sung over John's new backing track) was released as the single, and was more successful. "Nobody Wins" has received positive reviews from critics, with many reviewers making note of its Eurobeat and techno-pop sound and dramatic vocal performance and lyrics. Osborne himself has cited the track as one of his favorite collaborations with John.

== Reception ==
"Nobody Wins" was released in April 1981 as the lead single from The Fox to moderate success. In the US, it first charted on May 9, 1981, before reaching its peak of number 21 on June 27. It was less successful in the UK, where it stalled at number 42. Osborne has attributed the single's lack of success in the UK to John's refusal to appear on Top of the Pops to promote it, as he was only willing to appear on the program if the single had already cracked the top 40. For the French release, John chose to record the original version of the song, following up on the success of his duets with France Gall the previous year. "Fools in Fashion", a John-Taupin song cut from the original tracklisting of The Fox, was included on the single's B-side.
