= The Fox (Elton John album) =

Studio album by Elton John
- Released: 20 May 1981
- Recorded: 1979–1981
- Studios: Super Bear (Nice, France); Sunset Sound (Los Angeles); The Village (Los Angeles); Davlen (North Hollywood)
- Genre: Rock
- Length: 45:36
- Labels: Rocket; Geffen (US)
- Producers: Chris Thomas; Elton John; Clive Franks

Elton John chronology
21 at 33 (1980)	The Fox (1981)	Jump Up! (1982)

Singles from The Fox
- 1. "Nobody Wins" Released: April 1981; 2. "Just Like Belgium" Released: July 1981 (UK); 3. "Chloe" Released: July 1981 (US)

The Fox is the fifteenth studio album by British musician Elton John. It was released on 20 May 1981, through Geffen Records in the US (John's first release for the label) and The Rocket Record Company in all other territories. The album was John's first to be produced by Chris Thomas, who would go on to produce many of John's albums throughout the 1980s and 1990s, as well as John and Clive Franks. In addition to material written and recorded specifically for the album, multiple tracks originated from the sessions for John's previous album, 21 at 33 (1980).

As with its predecessor, The Fox contains contributions from multiple lyricists. In addition to the four songs written with longtime writing partner Bernie Taupin, the album also contains material written with Gary Osborne and Tom Robinson. The songs encompass a wide range of genres, including the synthpop of "Nobody Wins", the classical piece "Carla/Etude", and a stripped-back ballad in "Elton's Song".

Released among legal troubles with John's previous label MCA Records, The Fox was seen as a commercial slump, only reaching number 12 in the UK and number 21 in the US. "Nobody Wins" was released as the album's lead single and failed to make the top 40 in the UK, though it did reach the top 30 in the US. Reviews were tentatively positive, with many critics viewing it as an improvement from previous releases, yet not on the level of John's best work. To promote the album, music videos were created for each track and were released on a video collection entitled Visions.

== Background ==
After releasing Blue Moves in 1976, Elton John and Bernie Taupin put their writing partnership on hold, taking a break to collaborate with other lyricists/artists. John wrote the entirety of A Single Man (1978) with lyricist Gary Osborne, while the poorly received Victim of Love (1979) consisted entirely of songs by outside songwriters. In the meantime, Taupin worked with Alice Cooper; the two co-wrote the album From the Inside (1978). While in Grasse in 1979, John invited Taupin to resume their songwriting collaboration, and three John-Taupin compositions appeared on John's next album 21 at 33 (1980). Despite the reunion, John continued to work with other lyricists as well, including Osborne and fellow British songwriter Tom Robinson.

After the release of 21 at 33 John left his longtime label MCA Records and signed with Geffen Records. Upon signing with the label, John had hopes of collaborating with John Lennon, with whom he had been friends since the mid-70s, and who was also signed with Geffen Records. However, Lennon would be shot and killed on 8 December 1980.

== Writing and recording ==
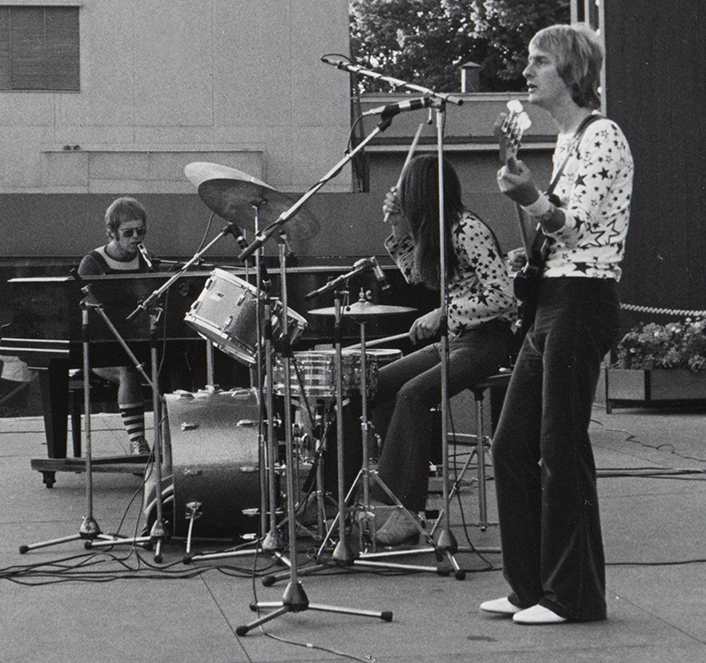
Drummer Nigel Olsson and bassist Dee Murray, both members of the "classic" Elton John Band lineup (pictured here performing with John in 1971), appear on The Fox, foreshadowing their eventual complete reunion on Too Low for Zero in 1983.

As with John's previous few albums, Clive Franks was selected to produce The Fox. However, Geffen rejected six of the songs on the completed album, and so John agreed to record new material on the condition that he could work with producer Chris Thomas, dismissing Franks. Among the songs cut was "The Man Who Never Died", an instrumental tribute to Lennon, which would later be released as the B-side to "Nikita" (1985). Franks' dismissal came as a surprise, with the producer stating the news "made [him] physically sick", and the departure led to the dissolution of John and Franks' Frank N. Stein production company. Despite this, Franks has continued to work with John, being part of his live sound crew.

Much of the lineup for The Fox remained the same as the lineup of the previous album: with lyricists Taupin, Osborne, and Robinson, and musicians from the 1970s lineup of the Elton John Band (Nigel Olsson and Dee Murray), as well as members of Toto (Steve Porcaro, Steve Lukather, and David Paich). On the material retained from the first version of the album, the rhythm section of Reggie McBride (bass) and Alvin Taylor (drums) was used. Reverend James Cleveland, along with the Cornerstone Baptist Church Choir, appeared on "Fascist Faces"; Cleveland had previously appeared on Blue Moves (1976).

Osborne has retrospectively described The Fox as "a bit of a dog's dinner", stating the material came from "all over the place", including left-over songs from 21 at 33. Writing for the album began in August 1979 in Grasse where three songs were started. "Elton's Song" is another track conceived in 1979, having been performed on John's tour of the USSR. "Breaking Down Barriers" stemmed from a 1980 BBC interview in which John was challenged to write a piece of music on the spot, building it from the poem Devotions upon Emergent Occasions by John Donne. The finished track features new lyrics by Osborne and minor alterations from its initial performance. "Nobody Wins" uses the melody of "J'Veux d'la Tendresse" by Janic Prévost, which John had heard during his time in France in the summer of 1980. Its lyrics were translated and altered by Osborne, who would later name it as his favorite out of his collaborations with John. "Carla" and "Etude" were originally two separate pieces before being merged into one track.

The skeleton versions for the three songs written in Grasse were recorded at Superbear Studios in Nice with Franks, while an instrumental segment was recorded at Davlen Studios in Los Angeles. This recording continued at Abbey Road Studios in London, where the London Symphony Orchestra recorded their part (for "Carla/Etude") on New Year's Eve of 1979. Work on the album proceeded in early 1980 at Sunset Sound Recorders, as 21 at 33 was inching towards completion; Sunset Sound was also used for the replacement tracks recorded with Thomas. Finally, Village Recorders was used to record backing vocals for three of the album's tracks. "Heart in the Right Place", "Carla/Etude", "Fanfare", "Chloe", and "Elton's Song" were retained from the first version of the album, with the rest of the material created after its initial rejection. Recording sessions were marred by a period of depression for John. Osborne later recalled a month in which he and John were located in Paris for scheduled recording sessions, which would instead be spent "play[ing] poker and [taking] drugs for a month". Compounding the bleak mood was the recent murder of Lennon; the tribute song "Empty Garden (Hey Hey Johnny)" was written the day after his death and would be released on Jump Up! (1982).

== Composition ==
The songs on The Fox span a wide variety of genres, including pop rock, blues, technopop, orchestral music, and ballads. Elizabeth Rosenthal, author of His Song: The Musical Journey of Elton John, considers the overarching theme of The Fox to be one of "sadness and disappointment", accentuated by the four-part suite which she believes to be the album's centerpiece. This is contrasted with the more hopeful lyrical content of the album's bookend tracks, "Breaking Down Barriers" and the title track.

=== Side one ===
The album opens with "Breaking Down Barriers". Opening with "rapid piano arpeggiations", the track exerts what Rosenthal describes as a "blaring bravado", with a vocal performance alternating between a "barrel-sized" chest voice and a higher falsetto. She describes the song's lyrical content as being sung from the point of view of a "protagonist [who], after years of living within a mental fortress", is "finally in touch with his feelings" and "unafraid to let love enter his mind and heart". In a retrospective of the album for PopMatters, Rich Wilhelm calls the song an "engaging, piano-based rocker" while also remarking on the prominent elements of 1970s Philadelphia soul. "Heart in the Right Place" is a blues-influenced track, interpreted as a critique of the British music press and its treatment of John at the time. Wilhelm describes the lyrics as "a venomous first-person narrative about a gossip columnist" accompanied by "appropriately snarling music". "Just Like Belgium" is a more pop-based track which lyrics have been described as "wistful" and as a "breezy travelogue", centered on "memory and travel", while themes of nostalgia have also been noted. Colette Bertrand, credited in the liner notes as the "French Girl", provides a spoken part on the track.

Featuring a much more synthetic sound than the rest of the album, "Nobody Wins" has been described as "Euro-beat" and "straight-up technopop circa 1981". Rosenthal considers Osborne's lyrics to be a depiction of John's own turbulent upbringing and family life, and the lingering effects of such conflict. Featuring simple production emphasizing synthesizers and programmed drums, "Nobody Wins" sees John utilize a lower vocal register than in past work. Wilhelm considers "Fascist Faces" to be the "hardest-rocking" track on the album, while Rosenthal likens it to a "rock-gospel protest song". The song has been interpreted as a comment on "anti-Communist hysteria", with a narrator who "resents being accused of Communist sympathies". Additionally, some reviewers have suggested the song may have been written as a comment on statements regarding Fascism made by David Bowie, particularly his infamous remark that "Britain could benefit from a fascist leader". Rosenthal also notes a sense of rising tension throughout the duration of the track, culminating in a final chorus in which John, Rev. James Cleveland and his choir "sing with outrage".

=== Side two ===
The album's second side begins with the suite of "Carla/Etude" (itself made up of two pieces), "Fanfare", and "Chloe". Biographer David Buckley compares the suite to earlier works such as "Funeral for a Friend/Love Lies Bleeding" (from Goodbye Yellow Brick Road, 1973) and "Tonight" (from Blue Moves, 1976) due to its "dynamic marriage of instrumental music and song". "Carla", named after Clive Franks' wife, is an instrumental piece featuring the London Symphony Orchestra. Rosenthal describes the track as a "simple piano lament", with the accompanying instrumentation including strings, French horn, and flute. This segues into "Fanfare", a short, synthesizer-based instrumental performed by James Newton Howard, incorporating melodic elements of the following track ("Chloe") and compared to New Age music. The final part of the suite, "Chloe", is a Fender Rhodes-laced ballad which also continues the use of orchestration (arranged by Newton Howard and Marty Paich). In an article ranking all of John's songs for Vulture, Shana Naomi Krochmal described the lyrical content as "a series of heartbroken and heartbreaking questions to a desperate lover", while Buckley notes the "confessional" tone of the words. Rosenthal considers the song to be particular downbeat and pessimistic, characterizing John's vocal delivery as being completely devoid of "any glimmer of happiness", a mood which is compounded by the "descending melody lines" and the "throaty utterance" of the name which provides the song's title at the conclusion of each verse. The name "Chloe" was a nickname for a recent partner of John's at the time (real name Charles).

Wilhelm finds "Heels of the Wind" to be a "catchy and lightweight tune", which contrasts with the lyrical content detailing "a relationship in peril". Rosenthal interprets its lyrics as "the story of a person willingly living a life without purpose, motive, or dreams", while the music evokes the feelings of this "solitary" character, while also emphasizing the weaving of John's "in-flight piano" with Newton Howard's "happy-go-lucky synthesizer". John would later describe "Elton's Song" as the "first gay song that I actually recorded as a homosexual song". Over sparse instrumentation of piano and synthesizer, "Elton's Song" sets a story of a schoolboy's crush on another male student. Rosenthal likens the music to that of "Carla/Etude", while also finding that the song lacks the "modest glint of happiness" found in the latter piece, which serves to accentuate the song's themes of "despair and the isolation that attends a secret, unrequited love". The album closes with the title track, which includes elements of gospel and country, the latter emphasized by prominent harmonica played by Mickey Raphael. Wilhelm finds the song provides a "friendly" yet "enigmatic" close to the album, while Rosenthal characterizes its lyrics as a "biographical sketch" with themes of perseverance and pushing back against critical backlash.

== Release ==
Legal troubles marred the release of The Fox. The album was originally supposed to be John's last for MCA Records, but his decision to instead release the album through Geffen meant he still owed his former label one more album to fulfill his contractual obligations. In March 1981, John delivered the six songs recorded with producer Thom Bell in 1977, three of which had already been released in alternate mixes on The Thom Bell Sessions (1979) and one of which appeared in truncated form on A Single Man (1978). However, MCA refused to accept the album, nor were they willing to pay John the $1.3 million owed to him for delivery of his final album. That same March, John alongside his manager John Reid and Sackville Productions filed suit against MCA, accusing the label of breaching the contract by refusing to accept the album and adequately promote it. MCA counter-sued them, claiming the six songs delivered did not sufficiently constitute an album. Additionally, MCA filed a suit against Geffen and Warner Bros., claiming they were entitled to a compensation for the recording cost of John's tracks while he was still signed with MCA. Moreover, MCA claimed ownership of The Fox and tried to file a restraining order against Geffen and Warner to prevent its release. The application ultimately was denied, and John was free to release The Fox on Geffen as he intended.

In April 1981, Geffen held a teleconference, conducted in a talk-show format (with John acting as its "host"), to promote the upcoming album. John lamented what he felt was his declining presence on FM radio and discussed his hopes that the new album would help him achieve renewed success on the format, citing "Fascist Faces" as a possible contender for FM radio play. To further promote the album, music videos were created for each of the album's eleven tracks. These videos would be compiled into a VHS collection entitled Visions and released in October 1982. While the collection passed by mostly unnoticed, the clip for "Elton's Song" caused minor controversy due to its subject matter, depicting a student harboring a homosexual crush. Due to outcry from the headmaster of the public school in which the video was filmed, the clip was removed from the British release of Visions.

=== Commercial performance ===
"Nobody Wins" was chosen as the album's first single. In the US, the song entered the charts on 9 May 1981, before reaching its peak on 27 June at 21st position. In the UK, the song was less successful, narrowly missing the top 40 and stalling at number 42. Osborne has attributed the single's lack of success in the UK to John's refusal to appear on Top of the Pops to promote it, as he was only willing to appear on the program if the single had already cracked the top 40. For the French release, John chose to record the original version of the song, following up on the success of his duets with France Gall the previous year. "Fools in Fashion", a John-Taupin song cut from the original tracklisting of The Fox, was included on the single's B-side. "Chloe" was chosen as the album's second US single and was released later in the summer of 1981. While it was another top 40 hit, reaching number 34, it still failed to match the success of John's singles from his previous few releases such as "Little Jeannie" from 21 at 33 and "Mama Can't Buy You Love" from The Thom Bell Sessions, both of which made the top 10. In the UK, the album's second single was "Just Like Belgium", which failed to chart. The B-side to "Chloe" featured the song "Tortured" (written with Taupin), while "Just Like Belgium" was backed with the country-influenced "Can't Get Over Getting Over Losing You" (written with Osborne).

Despite the extensive promotional efforts, The Fox was seen as a commercial slump for John. John's decision against touring through 1981 limited the promotion of the album, which was compounded by a relatively low number of television appearances, as well. While the album did spend nineteen weeks on the US Billboard 200, it failed to receive a Gold certification or make the top 20, stalling at number 21. The Fox fared slightly better in the UK, reaching number 12 and spending twelve weeks on the chart, a performance comparable to that of 21 at 33. The album was much more successful in Australia, peaking at number 4 and ultimately selling over 600,000 copies.

== Critical reception ==
Professional ratings
Review scores
Source	Rating
AllMusic	2.5/5 stars
The Encyclopedia of Popular Music	2/5 stars
Record Mirror	4/5 stars
Rolling Stone	3/5 stars
Smash Hits	5/10

Reviews for The Fox tended to range from mixed to positive. Billboard picked The Fox as its "spotlight" album for the issue dated 30 May 1981, calling it "one of John's more consistently satisfying LPs in recent times." "Nobody Wins", "Chloe", "Breaking Down Barriers", and "The Fox" were selected as highlights. Robin Smith praised the album in a review for Record Mirror, stating the album shows John "still has his finger on the pulse of what should be happening" and avoids feeling too "comfortable". Smith highlighted "Breaking Down Barriers" as "fleet footed and cunning", as well as describing the "Carla/Etude–Fanfare–Chloe" suite as "tasteful pieces of schmaltz that hit all the right places".

The Rolling Stone' Stephen Holden felt that the large number of writing partners on the album helps to take John's material into "several complementary directions". While he criticized Taupin's lyrics on "Just Like Belgium", "Fascist Faces", and the title track, feeling their "pretentious similes" and "purple imagery" got in the way of the songs' "streamlined melodies", he was more enthusiastic towards "Heels of the Wind", calling it a "hard-kicking anthem about the freedom of the road" which lacked the "literary heaviness" of the other three John-Taupin tracks. Holden also noted the growth of the John-Osborne writing partnership, declaring "Breaking Down Barriers" to be the duo's "most spirited achievement to date", while praising "Heart in the Right Place" for "evok[ing] rock-star petulance with an amusingly light-handed bitchiness." While Holden found "Elton's Song" to be the album's lyrical high point, he felt its "tune is too fragmented to nail down the poignantly direct sentiments."

Some reviews were more mixed, with Robin Katz of Smash Hits criticizing Osborne's lyrics for tackling "all-too-obvious themes" and Taupin's for their "wordy philosophies". Lindsay Planer was apprehensive towards the album in his retrospective review for AllMusic, stating that its "dithering musical styles" lead to "an uneven and at times somewhat dated sound." However, he also feels that the album continued to build momentum for John leading up to his eventual comeback with Too Low for Zero (1983). Additionally, he feels that the John-Osborne partnership was beginning to yield "impressive results" with "Heart in the Right Place", while also naming "Fascist Faces" and the title track as stronger points on the album.

In 2021, for the 40th anniversary of the album's release, PopMatters published a retrospective on The Fox where it declared the album to be a "lost gem" within John's catalogue. In the article, John Wilhelm praised the album for its "warm" and "eclectic nature" and for the wide array of genres explored. In a 2020 list for The Quietus, Scissor Sisters vocalist Jake Shears named The Fox among his thirteen favourite albums, particularly praising the "Carla/Etude–Fanfare–Chloe" medley.

== Track listing ==
Side one
No.	Title	Writer(s)	Producer(s)	Length
1.	"Breaking Down Barriers"	Elton John; Gary Osborne	Chris Thomas	4:40
2.	"Heart in the Right Place"	John; Osborne	John; Clive Franks	5:13
3.	"Just Like Belgium"	John; Bernie Taupin	Thomas	4:08
4.	"Nobody Wins"	Jean-Paul Dréau; Osborne	Thomas	3:42
5.	"Fascist Faces"	John; Taupin	Thomas	5:10
Total length:				22:53

Side two
No.	Title	Writer(s)	Producer(s)	Length
1.	"Carla/Etude"	John	John; Franks	4:45
2.	"Fanfare"	John; James Newton Howard	John; Franks	1:26
3.	"Chloe"	John; Osborne	John; Franks	4:39
4.	"Heels of the Wind"	John; Taupin	Thomas	3:37
5.	"Elton's Song"	John; Tom Robinson	John; Franks	3:03
6.	"The Fox"	John; Taupin	Thomas	5:13
Total length:				22:43

Note: Some CD editions of the album combine "Carla/Etude", "Fanfare", and "Chloe" into one track, while others combine the first two tracks while separating "Chloe".

== Personnel ==
Credits adapted from album liner notes:

- Elton John – lead vocals (1–5, 7–11), vocal solo (1), backing vocals (1, 2, 4, 5, 9), pianos (1, 3, 5), acoustic piano (2, 6–11)
- James Newton Howard – synthesizers (1–3, 7, 9, 10), vocoder (2), synthesizer programming (4, 10), additional synthesizers (4), orchestral arrangements and conductor (6, 7), Fender Rhodes (8), string arrangements and conductor (8), organ (11)
- David Paich – synthesizers (5)
- Steve Porcaro – synthesizer programming (5)
- Richie Zito – guitars (1, 3, 5, 9, 11)
- Steve Lukather – guitars (5)
- Dee Murray – bass (1, 3, 5, 9, 11), backing vocals (8)
- Reggie McBride – bass (2, 8)
- Nigel Olsson – drums (1, 9, 11)
- Alvin Taylor – drums (2, 8)
- Roger Linn – drum synthesizer programming (4)
- Jeff Porcaro – drums (5), LM-1 programming (5)
- Stephanie Spruill – tambourine (1, 9), backing vocals (1, 9)
- Victor Feldman – percussion (7, 8)
- Jim Horn – alto saxophone (3)
- Mickey Raphael – harmonica (11)
- London Symphony Orchestra – orchestra (6, 7)
- Marty Paich – string arrangements (8)
- Bill Champlin – backing vocals (1, 8, 9)
- Venette Gloud – backing vocals (1, 9)
- Tamara Matoesian – backing vocals (1, 9)
- Colette Bertrand – "French Girl" (3)
- Rev. James Cleveland – spoken word (5)
- Cornerstone Baptist Church Choir – choir (5)
- Gary Osborne – backing vocals (8)
- Max Gronenthal – backing vocals (8)
- Ronald Baker – backing vocals (11)
- Carl Carwell – backing vocals (11)
- Chuck Cissel – backing vocals (11)
- Clarence Ford – backing vocals (11)
- Roy Galloway – backing vocals (11)
- Jim Gilstrap – backing vocals (11)
- John Lehman – backing vocals (11)
- Oren Waters – backing vocals (11)

=== Production ===
- Chris Thomas – producer (1, 3–5, 9, 11)
- Clive Franks – producer (2, 6–8, 10)
- Elton John – producer (2, 6–8, 10)
- Bill Price – recording (1, 3–5, 9, 11)
- Jeremy Green – assistant engineer
- Patrick Jauneaud – assistant engineer
- John Kurlander – assistant engineer
- Peggy McCreary – assistant engineer
- Steve McManus – assistant engineer
- Karen Siegel – assistant engineer
- Tim Young – mastering
- Richard Seireeni – art direction
- Eric Blum – photography
- Terry O'Neill – Elton's photograph
- Fat Chance – furniture
- John Reid – management

== Charts ==
=== Weekly charts ===
Weekly chart performance for The Fox
Chart (1981)	Peak position
Australian Albums (Kent Music Report)	4
Austrian Albums (Ö3 Austria)	11
Canada Top Albums/CDs (RPM)	43
Dutch Albums (Album Top 100)	20
German Albums (Offizielle Top 100)	34
New Zealand Albums (RMNZ)	6
Norwegian Albums (VG-lista)	5
Swedish Albums (Sverigetopplistan)	24
UK Albums (Official Charts)	12
US Billboard 200	21

=== Year-end charts ===
Year-end chart performance for The Fox
Chart (1981)	Position
Australian Albums (Kent Music Report)	31
