= Dario (entertainer) =

American singer-songwriter

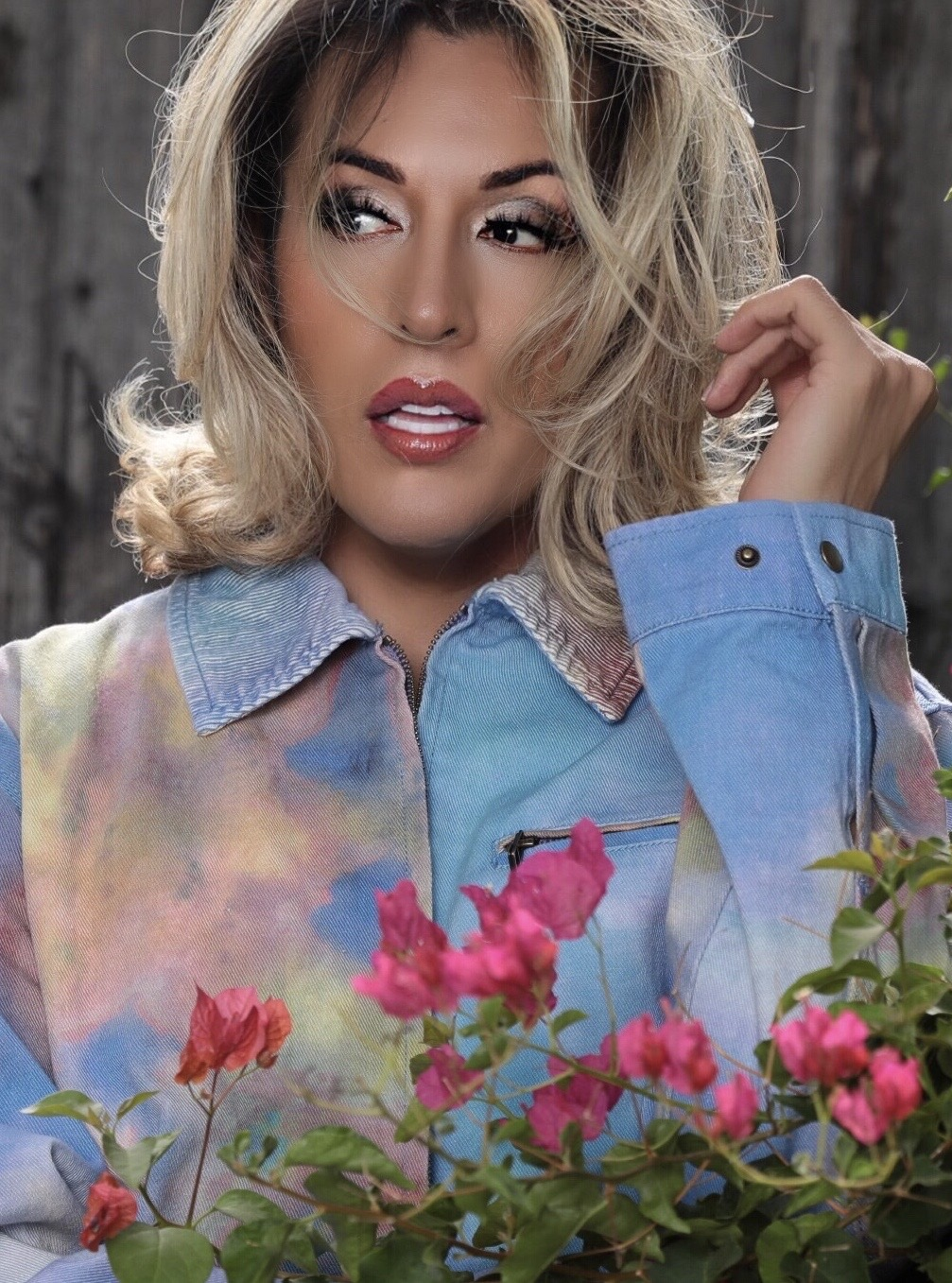

Background information
- Origin: Tucson, Arizona, United States
- Genres: Pop; R&B; dance
- Occupations: Singer; songwriter
- Instrument: Vocals
- Years active: 2004–present
- Labels: Dario Entertainment
- Website: darioonline.com

Dario Dicochea, better known as Dario, is an American singer-songwriter and pop/dance artist.

Dario grew up in Tucson, Arizona. Early in Dario's career as a musician, Dario started working with Arie Dixon of Tommy Boy Records, who produced Dario's album "The Up Side of Down". Since then, Dario has released an additional five albums.

Four of Dario's songs "(Let the Music) Save You", "Try It!", "Point of No Return" and "Shoulda Stayed" have peaked within the Billboard Dance Club Songs chart in the United States.

Dario has performed at Gay Pride concerts throughout the United States.

== Discography ==
=== Studio albums ===
List of extended plays, with selected chart positions
Title	Album details	Peak chart positions		
Title	Album details	US	US Indie	US Sales
Dedicated	Released: November 29, 2007; Label: Dario Entertainment; Formats: CD, digital download	—	—	—
The Up Side of Down	Released: May 10, 2011; Label: Dario Entertainment; Formats: CD, digital download	—	—	—
Evolution	Released: April 29, 2014; Label: Dario Entertainment; Formats: CD, digital download	—	—	—
Revolution	Released: May 5, 2015; Label: Dario Entertainment; Formats: CD, digital download	—	—	—
Alpha	Released: May 27, 2016; Label: Dario Entertainment; Formats: CD, digital download	94	6	33
Point of No Return	Released: February 24, 2017; Label: Dario Entertainment; Formats: CD, Digital download	93	3	24
Ascension	Released: June 7, 2019; Label: Dario Entertainment; Formats: CD, digital download	—	10	—

=== Singles ===
Year	Title	Peaks	Album
Year	Title	US Dance	Album
2004	"Be"	—	
2005	"Lies"	—	Dedicated
2013	"Talking Loud"	—	
2015	"(Let the Music) Save You"	36	Revolution
2016	"Try It!"	28	Alpha
2017	"Point of No Return"	25	Point of No Return
2019	"Shoulda Stayed"	24	Ascension
