= Elton's Song =

Song by Elton John

from the album The Fox
- Released: 20 May 1981
- Recorded: August 1979 – March 1980
- Studio: Super Bear (Nice, France); Sunset Sound Recorders, The Village Recorder and Davlen Sound Studios (Los Angeles, California); EMI Studios Abbey Road (Abbey Road, London, UK)
- Genre: Soft rock, pop
- Length: 3:02
- Label: Geffen (US), Rocket (UK)
- Songwriter(s): Elton John; Tom Robinson
- Producer(s): Chris Thomas, Elton John, Clive Franks

"Elton's Song" is a song written by Elton John (music) and Tom Robinson (lyrics). Recorded between August 1979 and March 1980 and produced by John and Clive Franks, the song first appeared much later on the 1981 album The Fox. The song is a rhapsodic ode with a theme of unrequited love.

Though lyrically genderless, the video for the song depicts a schoolboy with a crush on an older boy; Elton John told Rolling Stone that it was "the first gay song that I actually recorded as a homosexual song".

== Style ==
"Elton's Song" is a rhapsodic ode, the lyrics dealing with unrequited love. Though no gender is mentioned in the lyrics, the video for the song shows a schoolboy with a crush on an older boy. Themes of heartbreak and shame permeate. The music is comparatively stark, yet it subtly employs John's classical training (as well as a classical mood) in its occasional use of conflicting parallel major and minor keys. This plus the syncopation in the chorus helps to convey the wounded mood of the song. The spare arrangement consists entirely of John's piano and voice and "string" synthesizers programmed and played by James Newton Howard.

== Live performances ==
"Chloe", "Just Like Belgium", "Nobody Wins" and "Elton's Song" all from the album The Fox were included in Elton John's Jump Up tour in 1982. While "Chloe", "Just Like Belgium" and "Nobody Wins" were never performed again since that tour, "Elton's Song", a crowd popular song would be included in a few concerts on later solo tours notably in 1999.

== Music video ==
The song's music video was shot in a school and was included on a video album accompanying The Fox. It was never shown on television. According to Tom Robinson, Elton had the plot based on a subplot from the Lindsay Anderson movie if..... The music video presented a very clear interpretation of this song, showing a schoolboy pining for a slightly older and very athletic straight male classmate.

The theme of the love of a gay schoolboy caused a controversy, inspiring tabloid headlines such as "Elton's gay video shocker".

The video was directed by Russell Mulcahy and produced by Eric Fellner. The story line was written by Keith Williams on an idea supplied by Elton John himself who wanted a mini-movie made from the song without him necessarily having to appear/perform in it - a radical step in 1981 music videos.
