= Greatest Hits 1976–1986 =

Greatest hits album by Elton John
- Released: 1992
- Genre: Rock
- Length: 58:21
- Label: MCA
- Producer: Chris Thomas, Thom Bell, Elton John, Clive Franks, Gus Dudgeon

Elton John chronology
The One (1992)	Greatest Hits 1976–1986 (1992)	Rare Masters (1992)

Professional ratings
Review scores
Source	Rating
AllMusic	4.5/5 stars
The Encyclopedia of Popular Music	3/5 stars

Greatest Hits 1976–1986 is a collection of hits by Elton John released in the United States only by MCA Records in 1992. It replaced an earlier compilation, Geffen's 1987 release Elton John's Greatest Hits Vol. 3. This was necessitated because of a shift in the control of copyrights and a resulting reshuffling of compilation albums.

== Background ==
Ultimate ownership of Elton John's recordings had always rested with the artist's British labels. Hence DJM/This Record Company Ltd. owned all of John's recorded output up to and including 1976's Here and There while John's own royalty collection company (alternately called "Sackville" and "Happenstance") owned the recordings from 1976's "Don't Go Breaking My Heart" single and Blue Moves album onwards, which were released outside North America by The Rocket Record Company.

However, in the United States and Canada, this was obscured by the labels distributing the same material locally. MCA and its subsidiaries released all of the artist's product up through 1980's 21 at 33 (though Blue Moves had also borne the Rocket logo), resuming with 1987's Live in Australia with the Melbourne Symphony Orchestra while Geffen released everything from 1981's The Fox through 1986's Leather Jackets.

1977's Greatest Hits Volume II collection had, on both sides of the Atlantic, included material owned by both British proprietors. This had required an agreement between DJM and The Rocket Record Company in the UK, but not in North America where all recordings in question were under MCA anyway. Geffen's Greatest Hits Vol. 3 compilation had simply picked up where its predecessor had left off.

In 1992, Elton John signed to PolyGram Records worldwide. The deal gave PolyGram the rights to all of John's pre-1976 recordings (as well as his future output once his then-current MCA contract was satisfied). This meant that Greatest Hits Volume II could no longer be presented as before. Two years before, MCA had acquired Geffen Records.

In the new configuration, 1976's "Don't Go Breaking My Heart" and "Sorry Seems to Be the Hardest Word" were shifted over to the new Volume 3 (to be replaced on their original collection by earlier, previously uncollected songs.) The new collection also included "Who Wears These Shoes?", a minor 1984 hit that had been passed up by the earlier collection. To make room for these additions, two songs from the Geffen collection were purged, namely the 1983 album (title) track "Too Low for Zero" and the 1986 minor hit "Heartache All Over the World". The running order bore little resemblance to that of the Geffen compilation.

PolyGram was bought by MCA's successor Universal Music Group in 1998, thus consolidating worldwide distribution rights to all of John's catalogue (which included the soundtrack to the film Friends, originally released on Paramount Records, then reissued on ABC Records after buying the Paramount label, ABC Records itself was sold to MCA in 1979). Elton John currently co-owns his entire catalogue with Universal.

The album was reissued in 2001 on Island Records. After the consummation of the Universal/PolyGram merger, it was decided that Island would act as one of two American labels for Elton John (Island handled the back catalogue, while Universal, and later Interscope and Decca Records would handle new releases), and Mercury Records would be his international label. In the US, it was certified gold in January 1994, platinum in October 1995 and 2× platinum in August 1998 by the RIAA.

== Track listing ==
All tracks are written by Elton John and Bernie Taupin, except where noted.

No.	Title	Writer(s)	Original release	Length
1.	"I'm Still Standing"		Too Low for Zero (1983)	3:02
2.	"Mama Can't Buy You Love"	LeRoy Bell; Casey James	The Thom Bell Sessions (1979)	4:04
3.	"Sorry Seems to Be the Hardest Word"		Blue Moves (1976)	3:47
4.	"Little Jeannie"	John; Gary Osborne	21 at 33 (1980)	5:12
5.	"Blue Eyes"	John; Osborne	Jump Up! (1982)	3:26
6.	"Don't Go Breaking My Heart" (Duet with Kiki Dee)	Ann Orson; Carte Blanche; (pseudonyms of John and Taupin)	Non-album single (1976)	4:30
7.	"Empty Garden (Hey Hey Johnny)"		Jump Up!	5:11
8.	"Kiss the Bride"		Too Low for Zero	4:24
9.	"I Guess That's Why They Call It The Blues"	John; Taupin; Davey Johnstone	Too Low for Zero	4:42
10.	"Who Wears These Shoes?"		Breaking Hearts (1984)	4:02
11.	"Sad Songs (Say So Much)"		Breaking Hearts	4:08
12.	"Wrap Her Up"	John; Taupin; Charlie Morgan; Paul Westwood; Johnstone; Fred Mandel	Ice on Fire (1985)	6:09
13.	"Nikita"		Ice on Fire	5:44
Total length:				58:21

== Certifications ==
Region	Certification	Certified units/sales
United States (RIAA)	2× Platinum	2,000,000^{^}
^{^} Shipments figures based on certification alone.
