= Tour De Force (tour) =

1986 concert tour by Elton John

- National tour by Elton John
- Promotional poster
- Location: Australia, Oceania
- Start date: 5 November 1986
- End date: 14 December 1986
- Legs: 1
- No. of shows: 26

Elton John concert chronology
- Ice on Fire Tour (1985–86); Tour De Force (1986); Reg Strikes Back Tour (1988–89)

The Tour De Force was a concert tour by English musician and composer Elton John. The tour consisted in 26 shows scheduled in Australia accompanied by the Melbourne Symphony Orchestra.

== Tour ==
Elton John's Tour De Force of Australia with the Melbourne Symphony Orchestra (MSO) was the culmination of months of planning and preparation, as well as some remarkable stamina from the singer, who would have surgery on his vocal cords just three weeks after the final show.

This elaborate and ornate symphonic tour, the first of its kind by a rock star, concluded with 11 nights at the Sydney Entertainment Centre. John's core band, most of whom were retained from recording of the Leather Jackets album, also included the Onward International Horns, three backing singers, and now two percussionists (with Ray Cooper returning to join Jody Linscott).

== Show ==
The show that John performed was a product of five months of planning and countless rehearsals. It was the first time he had performed in Australia for two years.

The show was set in two-halves. The first half would be like any typical Elton John concert with John and his band. The second half of the concert included the Melbourne Symphony Orchestra.

The concerts consisted of two sets: the first was limited to John and his 14-piece band, including backing vocalists and the Onward International horn section, and his flamboyant stage dress, featuring Mohawk and Tina Turner wigs and some outlandish eyewear; the second featured John, the band and the 88-piece Melbourne Symphony Orchestra, with John dressed more classically in a powdered wig and late Mozart style 18th-century/mid-19th-century style formal wear.

The shows typically were approximately three hours long and comprised thirty-four songs. The tour ended on 14 December 1986, at Sydney's Sydney Entertainment Centre. In June the following year, Live in Australia with the Melbourne Symphony Orchestra was released showcasing music recorded on 14 December 1986, at the Sydney Entertainment Centre, which was the final show of the tour.

The tour, however, was somewhat marred by the fact John's voice was having problems. He would have coughing fits up on stage. It was during this tour it was discovered he had nodules on his vocal cords. He was scheduled to do three concerts in Perth but, according to Gus Dudgeon, "on the third night, he was sitting in his dressing room and suddenly found he couldn't speak at all". He was ordered not to speak for four days.

== Working with the orchestra ==
James Newton Howard, who was at the time an up-and-coming film composer in Hollywood, joined John to conduct and write larger, augmented charts of not only his own previous work on "Tonight", but also Paul Buckmaster's original arrangements, since the music was to be played by 88 musicians, instead of the smaller studio orchestra for which the compositions were originally designed. He also wrote brand new full orchestra parts for songs such as "Don't Let the Sun Go Down on Me", which previously only had horn arrangements.

== Recordings ==
John's live sound engineer, Clive Franks, handled the recording of the band (assisted by Keith Walker and Dennis Fox), while album producer Gus Dudgeon supervised recording of the orchestra by Leon Minervini and Nic Jeremy. Dudgeon took the tapes back to Wisseloord Studios in the Netherlands for mixing with engineer Graham Dickson, who had also worked on Leather Jackets.

A home video release commemorated the concert and was originally released on both laserdisc and VHS. A version of the Laserdisc program has surfaced on DVD. Of the "Elton & His Band" portion, "Daniel" and "Medley: A Song for You, Blue Eyes, I Guess That's Why They Call It the Blues" were issued in 1988 as bonus tracks on the Rocket maxi-single for "A Word in Spanish" (UK/Europe only) as EJSCD 18, 872 299–2. The audio from "Carla/Etude" from the concert appeared on the To Be Continued... boxed set.

== Tour dates ==
Date	City	Country	Venue
Oceania
5 November 1986	Brisbane	Australia	Brisbane Entertainment Centre
6 November 1986	Brisbane	Australia	Brisbane Entertainment Centre
7 November 1986	Brisbane	Australia	Brisbane Entertainment Centre
10 November 1986	Melbourne	Australia	Sports and Entertainment Centre
11 November 1986	Melbourne	Australia	Sports and Entertainment Centre
12 November 1986	Melbourne	Australia	Sports and Entertainment Centre
13 November 1986	Melbourne	Australia	Sports and Entertainment Centre
15 November 1986	Melbourne	Australia	Sports and Entertainment Centre
16 November 1986	Melbourne	Australia	Sports and Entertainment Centre
17 November 1986	Melbourne	Australia	Sports and Entertainment Centre
18 November 1986	Melbourne	Australia	Sports and Entertainment Centre
21 November 1986	Adelaide	Australia	Football Park
25 November 1986	Perth	Australia	Perth Entertainment Centre
26 November 1986	Perth	Australia	Perth Entertainment Centre
1 December 1986	Sydney	Australia	Sydney Entertainment Centre
2 December 1986	Sydney	Australia	Sydney Entertainment Centre
3 December 1986	Sydney	Australia	Sydney Entertainment Centre
4 December 1986	Sydney	Australia	Sydney Entertainment Centre
6 December 1986	Sydney	Australia	Sydney Entertainment Centre
7 December 1986	Sydney	Australia	Sydney Entertainment Centre
8 December 1986	Sydney	Australia	Sydney Entertainment Centre
9 December 1986	Sydney	Australia	Sydney Entertainment Centre
11 December 1986	Sydney	Australia	Sydney Entertainment Centre
12 December 1986	Sydney	Australia	Sydney Entertainment Centre
13 December 1986	Sydney	Australia	Sydney Entertainment Centre
14 December 1986	Sydney	Australia	Sydney Entertainment Centre

== Tour setlist ==
Elton and his band

1. "Funeral for a Friend"/"One Horse Town"
2. "Rocket Man"
3. "The Bitch Is Back"
4. "Daniel"
5. A Song for You / "Blue Eyes"/ "I Guess That's Why They Call It the Blues"
6. "Bennie and the Jets"
7. "Heartache All Over the World"
8. "Sad Songs (Say So Much)"
9. "This Town"
10. "I'm Still Standing"

Elton, band and the Melbourne Symphony Orchestra

1. "Sixty Years On"
2. "I Need You to Turn to"
3. "The Greatest Discovery"
4. "Tonight"
5. "Sorry Seems to be the Hardest Word"
6. "The King Must Die"
7. "Cold as Christmas (in the Middle of the Year)"
8. "Take Me to the Pilot"
9. "Carla/Etude"
10. "Tiny Dancer"
11. "Have Mercy on the Criminal"
12. "Slow Rivers"
13. "Madman Across the Water"
14. "Don't Let the Sun Go Down on Me"
15. "Candle in the Wind"
16. "Burn Down the Mission"
17. "Your Song"
18. "Saturday Night's Alright for Fighting"

== Personnel ==
- Elton John – lead vocals, piano
- Davey Johnstone – lead guitar, backing vocals
- David Paton – bass guitar
- Fred Mandel – keyboards, rhythm guitar
- Charlie Morgan – drums
- Ray Cooper – percussion
- Jody Linscott – percussion
- Raul D'Oliveira – trumpet (Onward International Horns)
- Paul Spong – trumpet (Onward International Horns)
- Rick Taylor – trombone (Onward International Horns)
- David Bitelli – tenor saxophone (Onward International Horns)
- Alan Carvell – backing vocals
- Helena Springs – backing vocals
- Shirley Lewis – backing vocals
- The Melbourne Symphony Orchestra
