= Elton John's Greatest Hits Vol. 3 =

Elton John's Greatest Hits Volume III

Greatest hits album by Elton John
- Released: 8 September 1987
- Recorded: 1977–1986
- Genres: Pop; rock
- Length: 56:50
- Label: Geffen
- Producers: Chris Thomas; Thom Bell; Elton John; Clive Franks; Gus Dudgeon

Elton John chronology
Live in Australia with the Melbourne Symphony Orchestra (1987)	Elton John's Greatest Hits Volume III (1987)	Reg Strikes Back (1988)

Professional ratings
Review scores
Source	Rating
AllMusic	4.5/5 stars
The Encyclopedia of Popular Music	3/5 stars
Tom Hull – on the Web	B

Elton John's Greatest Hits Volume III is the twenty-seventh album released by British musician Elton John. Released in 1987, 10 years after Elton John's Greatest Hits Volume II, the compilation album features his greatest hits from 1979 to 1986 and was made available only in the United States and Canada. All of the songs featured had previously been released on a previous album.

== History ==
The album was initially released under Geffen Records after Elton John returned to his US label. Geffen was later bought out by MCA Records in 1990. John had just left MCA after the label released Elton John's Greatest Hits Volume II.

One-third of the album is composed of songs from Too Low for Zero, John's 1983 album that received the most critical and commercial acclaim for the early 1980s, including the songs "I Guess That's Why They Call It the Blues" and "I'm Still Standing". Some of the John's less successful songs were also included on the tracking because they had been released in the past year. The album received a gold certification in February 1989, platinum in November 1991, and achieved 2× platinum in October 1995 by the RIAA.

In 1992, two years after MCA purchased Geffen, Greatest Hits Volume III was removed from the artist's catalogue and replaced with the Greatest Hits 1976–1986 album, and due to copyright issues, two tracks from Greatest Hits Volume II, "Don't Go Breaking My Heart" and "Sorry Seems to Be the Hardest Word" were moved to Greatest Hits 1976–1986 and replaced with "Tiny Dancer" and "I Feel Like a Bullet (In the Gun of Robert Ford)".

== Track listing ==
All tracks are written by Elton John and Bernie Taupin, except where noted.

Side one
No.	Title	Writer(s)	Original release	Length
1.	"I Guess That's Why They Call It the Blues"	John; Taupin; Davey Johnstone	Too Low for Zero (1983)	4:42
2.	"Mama Can't Buy You Love"	LeRoy Bell; Casey James	The Thom Bell Sessions (1979)	4:02
3.	"Little Jeannie"	John; Gary Osborne	21 at 33 (1980)	4:46
4.	"Sad Songs (Say So Much)"		Breaking Hearts (1984)	4:48
5.	"I'm Still Standing"		Too Low for Zero	3:03
6.	"Empty Garden (Hey Hey Johnny)"		Jump Up! (1982)	5:05

Side two
No.	Title	Writer(s)	Original release	Length
7.	"Heartache All Over the World"		Leather Jackets (1986)	4:01
8.	"Too Low for Zero"		Too Low for Zero	5:44
9.	"Kiss the Bride"		Too Low for Zero	4:20
10.	"Blue Eyes"	John; Osborne	Jump Up!	3:27
11.	"Nikita"		Ice on Fire (1985)	4:54
12.	"Wrap Her Up"	John; Taupin; Charlie Morgan; Paul Westwood; Johnstone; Fred Mandel	Ice on Fire	6:04
Total length:				56:50

== Credits ==
- Album coordinators – John David Kalodner & Robin Rothman
- Originally mastering – Greg Fulginiti
- Art direction/Design – Laura Lipuma
- Management – John Reid

== Charts ==
Chart (1987–1988)	Peak position
Canada Top Albums/CDs (RPM)	33
US Billboard 200	84

== Certifications ==
Region	Certification	Certified units/sales
United States (RIAA)	2× Platinum	2,000,000^{^}
^{^} Shipments figures based on certification alone.

== Sources ==
- "The Record Collectors Guild :: A website for the Record Collector. (Sections)". Archived from the original on 30 April 2017.
- "What is a Compilation Album -Music Industry Glossary". Archived from the original on 11 February 2017.
- "Elton John - Interview with Bob Harris on February 20, 1973 - YouTube". YouTube. December 2014.
- "Top 10 Albums of 1987". 16 December 2012.
- Suchet, Richard. "Now Compilation Albums Celebrate 30 Years". Sky News.
- John, Elton, Elton John's Greatest Hits Vol.3, vol. 3, MCA Records, event occurs at 53:26
- "Crowe, Cameron. "Elton John: My Life In 20 Songs." Rolling Stone 1194 (2013): 60-65. Academic Search Premier. Web. 29 Jan. 2017".
- "Lethbridge, L. "Rock with the classics (Elton John Wallace Collection)." (2000): 33-33".
- Harrison, Thomas (2011). Music of the 1980s. American history through music. Santa Barbara, Calif.: Greenwood.
- Bernardin, Claude; Stanton, Tom (1996). Rocket Man: Elton John from A-Z (illustrated, revised ed.). Greenwood Publishing Group, 1996. ISBN 9780275956981.
- Rosenthal, Elizabeth J. (2001). His Song: The Musical Journey of Elton John (illustrated ed.). Billboard Books, 2001. ISBN 9780823088935.
