= Candle in the Wind =

- Solid centre variant of the UK single

Single by Elton John

from the album Goodbye Yellow Brick Road
- B-side: "Bennie and the Jets"
- Released: 22 February 1974
- Recorded: May 1973
- Studio: Château d'Hérouville (Hérouville, France); mixed at Trident Studios (London, UK)
- Genre: Pop rock; soft rock
- Length: 3:50
- Label: MCA; DJM
- Songwriters: Elton John; Bernie Taupin
- Producer: Gus Dudgeon

Elton John singles chronology
"Bennie and the Jets" (1974)	"Candle in the Wind" (1974)	"Don't Let the Sun Go Down on Me" (1974)

Audio
- "Candle in the Wind" on YouTube
- "Candle in the Wind" (live at Hammersmith Odeon, 1973) on YouTube

"Candle in the Wind" is a song written by British musician Elton John and lyricist Bernie Taupin, and performed by John. It was originally written in 1973, in honour of Marilyn Monroe, who had died 11 years earlier.

In 1997, John performed a rewritten version of the song, "Candle in the Wind 1997", as a tribute to Diana, Princess of Wales. In 2004, Rolling Stone magazine listed the original version of the song at No. 347 of its 500 greatest songs of all time.

== Original version ==
The original version, which is in the key of E major, appeared on John's 1973 album Goodbye Yellow Brick Road and was released as a single in 1974. A live version was recorded on 14 December 1986 at the Sydney Entertainment Centre in Australia, featuring Elton alone with his piano with keyboard effects triggered by Elton during the performance. That version was released on 13 June 1987 on the album Live in Australia with the Melbourne Symphony Orchestra and as a single the following year. The single release of the original song reached No. 11 in the UK charts in 1974. At the time, it was not released as a single in the United States as "Bennie and the Jets" was chosen instead.

The lyrics of the song are a sympathetic portrayal of the life of Marilyn Monroe. The song's opening line "Goodbye, Norma Jean" refers to Monroe's real name, Norma Jeane (more commonly spelled Jean) Mortenson. Taupin was inspired to write the lyrics after hearing the phrase "candle in the wind" used by Clive Davis in tribute to Janis Joplin: "I just kept hearing this term [and] I thought, what a great way of describing someone’s life". He also cites the title of Aleksandr Solzhenitsyn's book as a source of inspiration. In the Eagle Vision Classic Albums documentary on the making of Goodbye Yellow Brick Road, Taupin said the song is about "the idea of fame or youth or somebody being cut short in the prime of their life. The song could have been about James Dean, it could have been about Montgomery Clift, it could have been about Jim Morrison ... how we glamorise death, how we immortalise people." Taupin has noted that the theory about him being a "rabid Marilyn Monroe fanatic" has been a common misconception: "It's not that I didn't have respect for her. It's just that the song could just as easily have been about James Dean or Jim Morrison, Kurt Cobain, Sylvia Plath, Virginia Woolf. I mean, basically, anybody, any writer, actor, actress, or musician who died young and sort of became this iconic picture of Dorian Gray, that thing where they simply stopped aging. It's a beauty frozen in time." In an interview with Rolling Stone in 2014, Taupin disputed the implication that he was a Monroe fan: "She is absolutely not someone I admired a lot as a kid or anything. She was just a metaphor for fame and dying young, and people sort of overdoing the indulgence, and those that do die young. The song could have easily have been about Montgomery Clift or James Dean or even Jim Morrison. But it seemed that she just had a more sympathetic bent to her, so I used her. And she was female, and that was more vulnerable. But it was really about the excesses of celebrity, the early demise of celebrities, and ‘live fast, die young, and leave a beautiful corpse.'" On the song composition itself, he stated: "I think it's one of the best marriages of lyric and melody that Elton and I have ever put together. But it doesn't change the fact that I wasn't particularly enamored by Marilyn Monroe." Taupin revealed in 2025, following the release of his memoir Scattershot: Life, Music, Elton, and Me, that his original inspiration for the song was Montgomery Clift, which came to him after watching The Misfits: "But then I wondered how many people would know who he was. Even though I didn’t care for Marilyn Monroe, people would think her a much more fragile character and more indicative of the ‘candle in the wind’, so I am glad I went with her. Otherwise, history would have been very different". In a BBC Radio 4 interview, Taupin said people, who assumed he was a Monroe fan, would send him memorabilia: “I had so much stuff, to the point where I convinced myself I was a fan and started buying stuff myself!”

=== Legacy ===
This version was ranked No. 347 on Rolling Stone's list of The 500 Greatest Songs of All Time in 2004. In 2010, the ranking dropped to No. 356.

During a concert on 7 April 1990 at Farm Aid IV, John dedicated the song to Ryan White, who had been suffering from AIDS. White died of AIDS complications the next day. John performed the song "Skyline Pigeon" at White's funeral.

=== Personnel ===
- Elton John – piano, lead vocals
- Davey Johnstone – electric guitar, acoustic guitar, backing vocals
- Dee Murray – bass guitar, backing vocals
- Nigel Olsson – drums, backing vocals

=== Charts ===
Chart (1974)	Peak position
Australia (Kent Music Report)	5
Ireland (IRMA)	8
New Zealand (Listener)	5
UK singles (OCC)	11

=== Certifications ===
Region	Certification	Certified units/sales
New Zealand (RMNZ)	2× Platinum	60,000^{‡}
United Kingdom (BPI)	Gold	400,000^{‡}
^{‡} Sales+streaming figures based on certification alone.

== 1986 live version ==
Single release of the 1986 live version

External audio
- "Candle in the Wind" (live, 1986) by Elton John on YouTube

On 14 December 1986, a live version of the song was recorded in Sydney, Australia. This version features only Elton John backing himself on the piano, and atmospheric keyboard textures and bass pedals, which were played by John via MIDI and keyboardist Fred Mandel. It was released in 1987 on the album Live in Australia with the Melbourne Symphony Orchestra and as a single.

In 1988, it reached number five on the UK singles chart and number six on the US Billboard Hot 100 making a return for John to chart inside the Top 40 in both countries after "Heartache All Over the World" and "Slow Rivers", two of his singles from his 20th album in 1986, Leather Jackets failed to reach the top 40 in either country.

Despite problems with his vocal cords at the time, the performance also earned John a Grammy nomination in 1988 for Best Male Pop Vocal Performance.

=== Accolades ===
Grammy Awards

Year	Nominee / work	Award	Result
1988	"Candle in the Wind (live 1986)"	Best Pop Vocal Performance – Male	Nominated

=== Personnel ===
- Elton John: lead vocals, piano
- Fred Mandel: keyboards

=== Charts ===
==== Weekly charts ====
Chart (1987–1988)	Peak position
Australia (Kent Music Report)	92
Canada Top Singles (RPM)	5
Canada Adult Contemporary (RPM)	1
Germany (GfK)	55
Ireland (IRMA)	4
Italy Airplay (Music & Media)	4
Luxembourg (Radio Luxembourg)	3
UK Singles (Official Charts)	5
US Billboard Hot 100	6
US Adult Contemporary (Billboard)	2

==== Year-end charts ====
Chart (1988)	Position
US Billboard Hot 100	71

== 1997 version ==
"Candle in the Wind 1997" or "Goodbye England's Rose" was a new recording of "Candle in the Wind", with new lyrics, written and recorded as a tribute to Diana, Princess of Wales who had died in an auto crash on 31 August 1997. Released in September 1997, the song peaked at No. 1 in the United Kingdom, becoming John's fourth No. 1 single. It also peaked at No. 1 in several other countries. This version was produced by George Martin. Guinness World Records lists this version as the second-best selling single in the world, with 33 million copies sold and as the highest-selling single since charts began in the 1950s. John has not performed this version live since Diana's funeral, and it has not appeared on any of his subsequent compilation albums, which instead use the original version.

== 2003 acoustic remix ==
Using the same vocal take as the original 1973 recording, engineer Greg Penny stripped away all instrumentation except Davey Johnstone's acoustic guitar. Even the double-tracking of the lead vocal was removed, leaving Elton and the original backing vocal arrangement of Dee Murray, Nigel Olsson and Davey Johnstone. The remix first appeared as a bonus track on the 30th Anniversary edition of Goodbye Yellow Brick Road and subsequently on the 2003 EP Remixed.

== Live performances ==
From its release until in 1984, John heavily performed this song with his band. From 1985 onwards, John played it solo mostly at the encore of his concerts and he rarely played this song with the band since then.

== Covers ==
The song has been covered by Sandy Denny, Ed Sheeran, 2CELLOS, amongst others.
