= Wrap Her Up =

Single by Elton John

from the album Ice on Fire
- B-side: "The Man Who Never Died"
- Released: 14 October 1985 (US); 29 November 1985 (UK)
- Recorded: January 1985
- Genre: Synth-rock; new wave; blue-eyed soul
- Length: 6:21 (album version); 4:18 (single version)
- Label: Geffen (US); Rocket (UK)
- Songwriters: Elton John; Bernie Taupin; Charlie Morgan; Paul Westwood; Davey Johnstone; Fred Mandel
- Producer: Gus Dudgeon

Elton John singles chronology
"Nikita" (1985)	"Wrap Her Up" (1985)	"Cry to Heaven" (1986)

Music video
- "Wrap Her Up" on YouTube

"Wrap Her Up" is a song recorded by British musician Elton John, which he co-wrote with lyricist Bernie Taupin, Davey Johnstone, Fred Mandel, Charlie Morgan, and Paul Westwood. It was released as the second single from his 1985 album Ice on Fire. George Michael provides backing vocals on the song.

It reached number 12 in the UK singles chart, number 22 in Australia, number 26 in Canada on the RPM Top Singles chart, and number 20 on the US Billboard Hot 100.

== Background ==
"Wrap Her Up" features George Michael, who sings in falsetto throughout the song. Michael was quoted at the time in Number One magazine that "up till the end of the song it doesn't sound like me. Well, it sounds like me... but with a garotte on my willy!"

The song talks about fashion models as it was notable for the number of famous women's names dropped toward the end, including Kiki Dee, who had duetted with John on the hit song "Don't Go Breaking My Heart" in 1976, and also provided background vocals for "Wrap Her Up". The rest of the list includes (in order) Marlene Dietrich, Marilyn Monroe, Brigitte Bardot, Doris Day, Billie Jean King, Samantha Fox, Joan Collins, Katharine Hepburn, Vivien Leigh, Grace Jones, Priscilla Presley, Vanessa Williams, Dusty Springfield, Nancy Reagan, Rita Hayworth, Madonna (as "Material Girl"), Julie Andrews, Superwoman, Annie Lennox, Mata Hari, Anouska Hempel, Shirley Temple, Tallulah Bankhead, Linda Lovelace, Little Eva, Nastassja Kinski, Princess Caroline of Monaco, Pat Fernandez (a close friend of George Michael who appeared in two Wham! videos), and Elsie Tanner. The single version fades out early, missing most of the list. The last name heard on the single edit is Vanessa Williams.

"Wrap Her Up" has the longest credit of songwriters on a Elton John song.

== Reception ==
Cash Box called it "a healthy tribute to the girl group's of yesteryear". Billboard said it has "shades of Temptations circa 1964".

== Music video ==
A music video was recorded for the song, which was directed by Russell Mulcahy, and featured John and Michael, as well as Kiki Dee (who gets a custard pie in the face from John) and John's backing band. The video was featured in the video compilation version of The Very Best of Elton John in 1990, but the song was not included on any formats of the audio release edition of the compilation. The music video version of the song is abridged, with a running time of four minutes and eleven seconds, almost two minutes shorter than the album version.

== Live performances ==
This song was heavily performed live during the 1985 leg of the Ice on Fire Tour. On the 1986 leg, John rarely performed this song on the concerts of the same tour.

== Personnel ==
- Elton John – lead vocals
- George Michael – guest vocals
- Fred Mandel – keyboards, sequencing
- Davey Johnstone – electric guitar, backing vocals
- Paul Westwood – bass
- Charlie Morgan – drums
- Phil Todd – alto saxophone
- David Bitelli – baritone and tenor saxophones, horn arrangements
- Rick Taylor – trombone
- Raul D'Oliveira – trumpet
- Paul Spong – trumpet
- James Newton Howard – string arrangements
- Kiki Dee – backing vocals
- Katie Kissoon – backing vocals
- Pete Wingfield – backing vocals

== Charts ==
=== Weekly charts ===
Chart (1985–1986)	Peak position
Australia (Kent Music Report)	22
Canada Top Singles (RPM)	26
Germany (GfK)	54
Ireland (IRMA)	12
Luxembourg (Radio Luxembourg)	6
New Zealand (Recorded Music NZ)	33
UK Singles (Official Charts)	12
US Billboard Hot 100	20
