= Elton John's Greatest Hits Volume II =

Greatest Hits Volume II

Greatest hits album by Elton John
- Released: 30 September 1977
- Recorded: 1971, 1974–1976
- Genre: Pop rock
- Length: 48:20 (DJM); 48:33 (MCA); 52:03 (Polydor)
- Labels: MCA (US); DJM (UK); Polydor (reissue)
- Producer: Gus Dudgeon

Elton John chronology
Blue Moves (1976)	Greatest Hits Volume II (1977)	A Single Man (1978)

Elton John's Greatest Hits Volume II is the sixteenth official album release for British musician Elton John, and the second compilation. The original 1977 US version features one song from 1971 and two songs from 1974 that were not on the first greatest hits album. It also features several hit songs from 1975 and two hit singles from John's past year of performing in 1976. The cover photograph was taken by Gered Mankowitz.

== Release ==
There are several versions of the album. There were two original versions, one in the United States and Canada and another for Great Britain and the rest of the world, both released in 1977. The British version, released on DJM Records, included "Bennie and the Jets", a song that had appeared on the 1973 album Goodbye Yellow Brick Road but had only recently been released as a single (1976) in Elton John's home country. In North America, where the album was released by MCA Records, this song had already appeared on the first volume of Greatest Hits. It was replaced with "Levon", an even older song (from 1971's Madman Across the Water album) that had not yet been collected.

The album also contained two songs that would later be replaced, "Sorry Seems to Be the Hardest Word" and "Don't Go Breaking My Heart" (with Kiki Dee) both from 1976. These were the newest songs on the collection, and the only two not owned by DJM/This Record Company. They had been released on Elton John's own label named The Rocket Record Company and were owned by his own royalty collection company, Sackville Productions. They appeared on this DJM album by mutual agreement. In North America, all his records were released by MCA (the singles from 1976 as well as the Blue Moves album also carried the Rocket logo), so, at that time, no agreement was necessary.

The original album contained a booklet containing lyrics to the songs (even to the covers of "Lucy in the Sky with Diamonds" and "Pinball Wizard"), with illustrations or performance photos for each song.

In 1992, a new version was released worldwide. Elton John had moved to PolyGram Records, who got the rights to all of his DJM recordings (pre-1976). MCA now controlled his post-DJM recordings, including his later work on Geffen Records which had been taken over by MCA. Geffen's Greatest Hits Volume III was deleted and replaced with Greatest Hits 1976–1986, which also contained "Sorry Seems to Be the Hardest Word" and "Don't Go Breaking My Heart" from the original version of Greatest Hits – Volume 2. On the new edition, those two songs were replaced with two singles not on the original version, 1971's "Tiny Dancer" and 1975's "I Feel Like a Bullet (In the Gun of Robert Ford)". Meanwhile, since the 1992 edition of Greatest Hits included "Bennie and the Jets" worldwide, Volume II then included "Levon" worldwide.

In the US, it was certified gold in September 1977, platinum in November 1977, 3× platinum in March 1993, 4× platinum in September 1995, and 5× platinum in August 1998 by the RIAA.

All of these versions contain "The Bitch Is Back", "Someone Saved My Life Tonight", "Philadelphia Freedom", "Island Girl", "Grow Some Funk of Your Own" and John's covers of "Lucy in the Sky with Diamonds" and "Pinball Wizard".

== Critical reception ==
Professional ratings
Review scores
Source	Rating
AllMusic	5/5 stars
Christgau's Record Guide	B+
The Encyclopedia of Popular Music	3/5 stars
Tom Hull – on the Web	B+

Reviewing in Christgau's Record Guide: Rock Albums of the Seventies (1981), Robert Christgau wrote:

"The two previously-unavailable-on-LP originals here are peaks, but the two covers are dippy. Plus the lead cut from Caribou and two hits from Rock of the Westies and leftovers from 1971 and 1976 and the climax of Captain Fantastic. Is this product necessary? Depends on who's doing the needing."

== Track listing ==
All tracks are written by Elton John and Bernie Taupin, except where noted.

Side one
No.	Title	Writer(s)	Original release	Length
1.	"The Bitch Is Back"		Caribou, 1974	3:39
2.	"Lucy in the Sky with Diamonds"	Lennon–McCartney	single, 1974	5:58
3.	"Sorry Seems to Be the Hardest Word"		Blue Moves, 1976	3:43
4.	"Don't Go Breaking My Heart" (with Kiki Dee)	Ann Orson; Carte Blanche (pseudonyms for John and Taupin)	single, 1976	4:23
5.	"Someone Saved My Life Tonight"		Captain Fantastic and the Brown Dirt Cowboy, 1975	6:45

Side two
No.	Title	Writer(s)	Original release	Length
1.	"Philadelphia Freedom"		single, 1975	5:20
2.	"Island Girl"		Rock of the Westies, 1975	3:43
3.	"Grow Some Funk of Your Own"	John; Taupin; Davey Johnstone	Rock of the Westies	4:16
4.	"Bennie and the Jets"		Goodbye Yellow Brick Road, 1973	5:10
5.	"Pinball Wizard"	Pete Townshend	Tommy, 1975	5:10

Notes:

- The original North American edition replaces "Bennie and the Jets" with "Levon" from Madman Across the Water (1971).
- The 1992 Polydor Records reissue replaces "Sorry Seems to Be the Hardest Word" and "Don't Go Breaking My Heart" with "Tiny Dancer" (from Madman Across the Water) and "I Feel Like a Bullet (In the Gun of Robert Ford)" (from Rock of the Westies).

== Charts ==
Chart (1977–1978)	Peak position
Australian Albums (Kent Music Report)	46
Canada Top Albums/CDs (RPM)	6
New Zealand Albums (RMNZ)	6
UK Albums (Official Charts)	6
US Billboard 200	21

== Certifications ==
Region	Certification	Certified units/sales
Australia (ARIA)	2× Gold	40,000^{^}
Canada (Music Canada)	2× Platinum	200,000^{^}
United Kingdom (BPI)	Platinum	300,000^{^}
United States (RIAA)	5× Platinum	5,000,000^{^}
^{^} Shipments figures based on certification alone.
