= Live in Australia with the Melbourne Symphony Orchestra =

Live album by Elton John
- Released: July 1987 (US); September 1987 (UK)
- Recorded: 14 December 1986
- Venue: Sydney Entertainment Centre (Sydney, Australia)
- Genre: Rock
- Length: 73:46
- Labels: Rocket (UK); MCA (US); Festival/ABC/Warner Bros. (Australasia)
- Producer: Gus Dudgeon

Elton John chronology
Leather Jackets (1986)	Live in Australia with the Melbourne Symphony Orchestra (1987)	Elton John's Greatest Hits Vol. 3 (1987)

Singles from Live in Australia with the Melbourne Symphony Orchestra
- 1. "Your Song [live]" Released: July 1987; 2. "Candle in the Wind [live]" Released: 1987; 3. "Take Me to the Pilot [live]" Released: 1988

Professional ratings
Review scores
Source	Rating
AllMusic	3/5 stars
The Encyclopedia of Popular Music	2/5 stars
Number One	4/5 stars

Live in Australia with the Melbourne Symphony Orchestra is the twenty-eighth official album release for British musician Elton John, released in 1987. It is a live album recorded at the Sydney Entertainment Centre on 14 December 1986 with the Melbourne Symphony Orchestra.

== Album history ==
The concert, recorded on 14 December 1986, was the last of a series of concerts done throughout the last two months of 1986, which were part of Elton John's Tour De Force tour of Australia and New Zealand. The concerts consisted of two sets: the first was limited to John and his 14-piece Elton John Band, including backing vocalists and the Onward International horn section, and his flamboyant stage dress, featuring Mohawk and Tina Turner wigs and some outlandish eyewear; the second featured John, the band and the 88-piece Melbourne Symphony Orchestra, with him dressed as Mozart.

John's band was essentially the lineup used on Leather Jackets, which he was touring behind at the time, including Jody Linscott and special guest Ray Cooper, both of whom played percussion.

James Newton Howard, who had previously played keyboards in John's band during 1975-1976's Rock of the Westies Tour and Louder Than Concorde Tour and was at the time an up-and-coming film composer in Hollywood, joined John to conduct and write larger, augmented charts of not only his own previous work on "Tonight," but also Paul Buckmaster's original arrangements, since the music was to be played by 88 musicians, instead of the smaller studio orchestra for which the compositions were originally designed. He also wrote brand new full orchestra parts for songs such as "Don't Let the Sun Go Down on Me", which previously only had a horn arrangement.

The album features most of the songs recorded in the second half of the show, excluding "Saturday Night's Alright for Fighting", "Carla/Etude", "Cold as Christmas (In the Middle of the Year)" and "Slow Rivers", which was sung by John alone (John dueted "Slow Rivers" with Cliff Richard on Leather Jackets).

John's live sound engineer, Clive Franks, handled the recording of the band (assisted by Keith Walker and Dennis Fox), while album producer Gus Dudgeon supervised recording of the orchestra by Leon Minervini and Nic Jeremy. Dudgeon took the tapes back to Wisseloord Studios in the Netherlands for mixing with engineer Graham Dickson, who had also worked on Leather Jackets.

This concert was the last to feature John's legendary stage costumes, which he had featured in his shows since the early 1970s. It was also his last show before undergoing throat surgery in January 1987. Despite being completely successful, the surgery prevented John from singing and touring for several months and permanently altered his voice.

== Track listing ==
All songs written by Elton John and Bernie Taupin.

1. "Sixty Years On" – 5:41
2. "I Need You to Turn To" – 2:47
3. "The Greatest Discovery" – 4:29
4. "Tonight" – 8:03
5. "Sorry Seems to Be the Hardest Word" – 3:51
6. "The King Must Die" – 5:30
7. "Take Me to the Pilot" – 4:22
8. "Tiny Dancer" – 6:27
9. "Have Mercy on the Criminal" – 6:09
10. "Madman Across the Water" – 6:38
11. "Candle in the Wind" – 4:00
12. "Burn Down the Mission" – 5:49
13. "Your Song" – 4:04
14. "Don't Let the Sun Go Down on Me" – 6:06

=== Laserdisc edition ===
Side 1 (Elton and His Band)

1. "Funeral for a Friend"
2. "One Horse Town"
3. "Rocket Man"
4. "The Bitch Is Back"
5. "Daniel"
6. "A Song for You"
7. "Blue Eyes"
8. "I Guess That's Why They Call It the Blues"
9. "Bennie and the Jets"
10. "Sad Songs (Say So Much)"
11. "I'm Still Standing"

Side 2 (Elton and Orchestra)

1. "Sixty Years On"
2. "I Need You to Turn To"
3. "Sorry Seems to Be the Hardest Word"
4. "Take Me to the Pilot"
5. "Don't Let the Sun Go Down on Me"
6. "Candle in the Wind"
7. "Burn Down The Mission"
8. "Your Song"
9. "Saturday Night's Alright for Fighting"

== Releases ==
In the US, it was certified gold in January 1988 and platinum in October 1995 by the RIAA.

A home video release commemorated the concert and was originally released on both laserdisc and VHS. Both editions included most of the "Elton & His Band" portion of the show (except "Heartache All Over The World" and "This Town"), but omitted several songs in the symphony orchestra portion ("The Greatest Discovery", "Tonight", "The King Must Die", "Cold as Christmas", "Carla/Etude", "Tiny Dancer", "Have Mercy on the Criminal", "Slow Rivers", and "Madman Across the Water".) A version of the Laserdisc program has surfaced on DVD. In terms of audio, the "Elton & His Band" portion, "Daniel" and "Medley: Song for You, Blue Eyes, I Guess That's Why They Call It the Blues" were issued in 1988 as bonus tracks on the Rocket Records maxi-single for "A Word in Spanish" (UK/Europe only) as EJSCD 18, 872 299-2. The audio from "Carla/Etude" from the concert appeared on the To Be Continued... boxed set.

=== CD editions ===
The running time of the original 1987 US CD release on MCA Records (MCAD-8022) is 73:58, whilst the 1998 remastered CD edition on Mercury/Island Records (314 558 477-2) runs only 73:48. The missing time is due to the removal of several seconds of applause following the song "Tonight".

The track listing for both editions is the same. However, the running time of most of the remastered tracks vary from the original release due to a different placement of the track marks between songs. In many cases, the track mark changes move a song's spoken introduction from the beginning of the track to the end of the preceding track.

== Personnel ==
- Produced by Gus Dudgeon
- Mastered by Greg Fulginiti US
- Elton John – piano, vocals
- Davey Johnstone – guitars
- David Paton – bass guitar
- Charlie Morgan – drums
- Fred Mandel – keyboards, synthesizers
- Ray Cooper – percussion
- Jody Linscott – percussion
- Raul D'Oliveira – trumpet (Onward International Horns)
- Paul Spong – trumpet (Onward International Horns)
- Rick Taylor – trombone (Onward International Horns)
- David Bitelli – tenor saxophone (Onward International Horns)
- Alan Carvell – backing vocals
- Gordon Neville – backing vocals
- Shirley Lewis – backing vocals
- James Newton Howard – orchestral arrangements, conductor
- Melbourne Symphony Orchestra

== Charts ==
Chart (1987–1988)	Peak position
Australian Albums (Kent Music Report)	5
Canada Top Albums/CDs (RPM)	41
Dutch Albums (Album Top 100)	43
German Albums (Offizielle Top 100)	29
New Zealand Albums (RMNZ)	11
Swiss Albums (Schweizer Hitparade)	9
UK Albums (Official Charts)	43
US Billboard 200	24

== Certifications and sales ==
Region	Certification	Certified units/sales
Australia (ARIA)	Platinum	85,000
Canada (Music Canada)	2× Platinum	200,000^{^}
Netherlands	—	10,000
Spain	—	25,000
United Kingdom (BPI)	Silver	60,000^{^}
United States (RIAA)	Platinum	1,000,000^{^}
^{^} Shipments figures based on certification alone.
