= Heartache All Over the World =

1986 song by Elton John

Single by Elton John

from the album Leather Jackets
- B-side: "Highlander" (John)
- Released: September 1986
- Recorded: 1985–1986
- Studio: Wisseloord, Hilversum; CTS, London; The SOL, Cookham
- Genre: Pop
- Length: 4:24 (single); 8:02 (12" remix); 3:57 (music video); 4:17 (album)
- Label: Geffen (US), Rocket (UK)
- Songwriters: Elton John; Bernie Taupin
- Producer: Gus Dudgeon

Elton John singles chronology
"Cry to Heaven" (1986)	"Heartache All Over the World" (1986)	"Slow Rivers" (1986)

"Heartache All Over the World" is a song by British musician Elton John and lyricist Bernie Taupin from John's twentieth studio album Leather Jackets (1986). It was released as the album's lead single in September 1986, charting at number 45 in the UK singles chart and at number 55 on the US Billboard Hot 100, and reaching the top 10 in Australia, where it peaked at number seven. The song talks about not being able to date for a night.

John performed the song four times during his Tour De Force tour in Australia in 1986, which is notable for John's problems with his vocal cords during that time.

== Release and reception ==
"Heartache All Over the World" reached number 45 in the UK singles chart and stayed on the chart for four weeks, number 55 on the US Billboard Hot 100 and number 58 in Canada, making this song one of the worst-charting singles in John's career. The song had more success in Belgium (No. 26), Ireland (No. 24), New Zealand (No. 22) and notably Australia, peaking at number seven.

Billboard said that the lyrics are "of the 'lonely teenager' school" and the overdubs are "out of the Spector handbook." Cash Box said it has a "a perky groove" after a "high-tech/rap intro."

In 2001, John said he regarded "Heartache All Over the World" as the worst song he had ever recorded, calling it "pretty insubstantial". In his 2019 autobiography Me, he described the song as "lightweight".

== Music video ==
The music video, directed by Mike Brady, features John and his band playing the song in a stage-like background. It also includes clips from mid-1940s movies and some historical events.

== Chart performance ==
=== Weekly charts ===
Chart (1986)	Peak position
Australia (Kent Music Report)	7
Belgium (Ultratop 50 Flanders)	26
Canada Top Singles (RPM)	58
Ireland (IRMA)	24
New Zealand (Recorded Music NZ)	22
UK Singles (Official Charts)	45
US Billboard Hot 100	55

=== Year-end charts ===
Chart (1986)	Position
Australia (Kent Music Report)	76

== Personnel ==
- Elton John – vocals
- Charlie Morgan – drums
- Davey Johnstone – guitars, backing vocals
- Fred Mandel – Prophet 2000, Roland P60 and programming
- Gus Dudgeon – electronic percussion
- Graham Dickson – electronic percussion
- Vicky Brown, Alan Carvell, Gordon Neville – backing vocals
