= Ice on Fire Tour =

1985–86 concert tour by Elton John

- Tour by Elton John
- Poster to the concert in Rotterdam, The Netherlands
- Location: Europe • North America
- Associated album: Ice on Fire
- Start date: 14 November 1985
- End date: 15 October 1986
- Legs: 3
- No. of shows: 122

Elton John concert chronology
- Breaking Hearts Tour (1984); Ice on Fire Tour (1985–86); Tour De Force (1986)

The Ice on Fire Tour was a worldwide concert tour held by English musician and composer Elton John, in support of his 19th studio album Ice on Fire. The tour included three legs (in the UK, Europe and North America) and a total of 122 shows.

== Background ==
John had decided he wanted to hit the road with his new band, made up of some of the musicians who had worked with him on the Ice on Fire album in January, as well as a new set of backing singers: Alan Carvell, Helena Springs and Shirley Lewis – making it the largest band John had ever taken on tour.

On 14 November 1985, the tour began in Dublin and continued across the British Isles, including nine nights in a row at Wembley Arena, before concluding on 11 January 1986, in Belfast, Northern Ireland. As usual, John would select a handful of songs from his most recent album for inclusion in the set; in this instance, "Shoot Down the Moon", "This Town" and the singles "Nikita" and "Wrap Her Up" — all from Ice on Fire. The tour would continue in three months' time, but with a different percussionist.

Percussionist Jody Linscott replaced Ray Cooper on this second leg of the 1985–1986 World Tour, which began at the Palacio de Deportes de la Comunidad de Madrid on 1 March and continued through Europe before concluding on 26 April at the Vorst Nationaal in Brussels, Belgium.

After a four-month a break, during which John and the band recorded the Leather Jackets album, the North American leg of the world tour began at the Pine Knob Music Theatre in Clarkston, Michigan on 17 August and ended on 15 October with eight nights at Los Angeles' Universal Amphitheatre. One unique aspect to this tour was that John played acoustic guitar on stage (on Lesley Duncan's "Love Song"), something he had not done since 1976.

This part of the tour proved especially difficult for John, who unknowingly had developed potentially cancerous nodules on his vocal cords, and by the time he played his four-night run in New York City in mid-September, he was having a great deal of difficulty singing. John was ordered by his doctor not to speak while off-stage, and there was serious doubt as to whether or not he could finish this segment of the tour, let alone pull off the upcoming symphonic tour of Australia.

== Setlists ==
=== 1985 ===
Standard Setlist
1. "Highlander"
2. "Tonight"
3. "One Horse Town"
4. "Better Off Dead"
5. "Rocket Man"
6. "Honky Cat"
7. "Burn Down the Mission"
8. "Someone Saved My Life Tonight"
9. "The Bitch Is Back"
10. "Song for You"/"Blue Eyes"/"I Guess That's Why They Call It the Blues"
11. "Restless"
12. "Passengers"
13. "Bennie and the Jets"
14. "Sad Songs (Say So Much)"
15. "Shoot Down the Moon"
16. "This Town"
17. "Nikita"
18. "I'm Still Standing"
19. "Your Song"
20. "Wrap Her Up"
21. "Candle in the Wind"
22. "Kiss the Bride"
23. "Can I Get a Witness"

=== 1986 ===
Standard European Setlist
1. "Highlander"
2. "Tonight"
3. "One Horse Town"
4. "Better Off Dead"
5. "Rocket Man"
6. "Philadelphia Freedom"
7. "Burn Down the Mission"
8. "Someone Saved My Life Tonight"
9. "The Bitch Is Back"
10. "Song for You"/"Blue Eyes"/"I Guess That's Why They Call It the Blues"
11. "Paris"
12. "Restless"
13. "Bennie and the Jets"
14. "Sad Songs (Say So Much)"
15. "Cry to Heaven"
16. "This Town"
17. "Nikita"
18. "I'm Still Standing"
19. "Song for Guy"
20. "Wrap Her Up"
21. "Candle in the Wind"
22. "Saturday Night's Alright for Fighting"
23. "Your Song"
24. "Can I Get a Witness"
Standard North American Setlist
1. "Tonight"
2. "One Horse Town"
3. "Better Off Dead"
4. "Rocket Man"
5. "Philadelphia Freedom"
6. "Burn Down the Mission"
7. "Someone Saved My Life Tonight"
8. "The Bitch Is Back"
9. "Song for You"/"Blue Eyes"/"I Guess That's Why They Call It the Blues"
10. "Levon"
11. "Paris"
12. "Restless"
13. "Bennie and the Jets"
14. "Love Song"
15. "Sad Songs (Say So Much)"
16. "This Town"
17. "I'm Still Standing"
18. "Nikita"
19. "Saturday Night's Alright for Fighting"
20. "Candle in the Wind"
21. "Daniel"
22. "Your Song"
23. ”Can I Get A Witness”

== Tour dates ==
Date	City	Country	Venue
Europe
14 November 1985	Dublin	Ireland	Royal Dublin Society
15 November 1985	Dublin	Ireland	Royal Dublin Society
16 November 1985	Dublin	Ireland	Royal Dublin Society
17 November 1985	Dublin	Ireland	Royal Dublin Society
20 November 1985	Newport	Wales	Newport Centre
21 November 1985	Newport	Wales	Newport Centre
23 November 1985	Cornwall	England	St Austell Coliseum
24 November 1985	Cornwall	England	St Austell Coliseum
26 November 1985	Sheffield	England	Sheffield City Hall
27 November 1985	Sheffield	England	Sheffield City Hall
28 November 1985	Edinburgh	Scotland	Edinburgh Playhouse
29 November 1985	Edinburgh	Scotland	Edinburgh Playhouse
1 December 1985	Manchester	England	Manchester Apollo
2 December 1985	Manchester	England	Manchester Apollo
3 December 1985	Manchester	England	Manchester Apollo
4 December 1985	Nottingham	England	Nottingham Royal Concert Hall
5 December 1985	Nottingham	England	Nottingham Royal Concert Hall
7 December 1985	Brighton	England	The Brighton Centre
11 December 1985	London	England	Wembley Arena
12 December 1985	London	England	Wembley Arena
13 December 1985	London	England	Wembley Arena
14 December 1985	London	England	Wembley Arena
15 December 1985	London	England	Wembley Arena
16 December 1985	London	England	Wembley Arena
17 December 1985	London	England	Wembley Arena
18 December 1985	London	England	Wembley Arena
19 December 1985	London	England	Wembley Arena
21 December 1985	Birmingham	England	National Exhibition Centre
22 December 1985	Birmingham	England	National Exhibition Centre
23 December 1985	Birmingham	England	National Exhibition Centre
30 December 1985	Bournemouth	England	Bournemouth International Centre
31 December 1985	Bournemouth	England	Bournemouth International Centre
3 January 1986	Glasgow	Scotland	Glasgow Centre
4 January 1986	Glasgow	Scotland	Glasgow Centre
5 January 1986	Newcastle	England	Newcastle City Hall
6 January 1986	Newcastle	England	Newcastle City Hall
7 January 1986	Newcastle	England	Newcastle City Hall
9 January 1986	Belfast	Northern Ireland	King's Hall
10 January 1986	Belfast	Northern Ireland	King's Hall
11 January 1986	Belfast	Northern Ireland	King's Hall
1 March 1986	Madrid	Spain	Palacio de Deportes
2 March 1986	San Sebastian	Spain	Velódromo de Anoeta
4 March 1986	Barcelona	Spain	Palau dels Esports de Barcelona
6 March 1986	Bordeaux	France	Patinoire de Mériadeck
7 March 1986	Toulouse	France	Palais des Sports de Toulouse
8 March 1986	Toulouse	France	Palais des Sports de Toulouse
10 March 1986	Lyon	France	Palais des Sports de Gerland
11 March 1986	Marseille	France	Parc des Expositions
12 March 1986	Montpellier	France	Zénith Sud
14 March 1986	Nantes	France	Palais des Sports de Beaulieu
15 March 1986	Brest	France	Parc de Penfeld
17 March 1986	Lille	France	Palais des Sports Saint-Sauveur
18 March 1986	Paris	France	Palais Omnisports de Paris-Bercy
19 March 1986	Paris	France	Palais Omnisports de Paris-Bercy
20 March 1986	Paris	France	Palais Omnisports de Paris-Bercy
21 March 1986	Paris	France	Palais Omnisports de Paris-Bercy
22 March 1986	Paris	France	Palais Omnisports de Paris-Bercy
23 March 1986	Lausanne	Switzerland	Palais de Beaulieu
25 March 1986	Basel	Switzerland	St. Jakobshalle
26 March 1986	Zürich	Switzerland	Hallenstadion
27 March 1986	Zürich	Switzerland	Hallenstadion
29 March 1986	Munich	West Germany	Olympiahalle
30 March 1986	Munich	West Germany	Olympiahalle
1 April 1986	West Berlin	West Germany	Deutschlandhalle
2 April 1986	Hanover	West Germany	Eilenriedehalle
3 April 1986	Frankfurt	West Germany	Festhalle Frankfurt
4 April 1986	Frankfurt	West Germany	Festhalle Frankfurt
5 April 1986	Dortmund	West Germany	Westfalenhallen
6 April 1986	Cologne	West Germany	Koln Sporthalle
8 April 1986	Ludwigshafen	West Germany	Friedrich-Ebert-Halle
9 April 1986	Ludwigshafen	West Germany	Friedrich-Ebert-Halle
10 April 1986	Stuttgart	West Germany	Hanns-Martin-Schleyer-Halle
12 April 1986	Hamburg	West Germany	Alsterdorfer Sporthalle
13 April 1986	Hamburg	West Germany	Alsterdorfer Sporthalle
14 April 1986	Hamburg	West Germany	Alsterdorfer Sporthalle
16 April 1986	Bremen	West Germany	Stadthalle
19 April 1986 (Postponed due to a bomb scare)	Vienna	Austria	Wiener Stadthalle
20 April 1986 (Afternoon & Evening)	Vienna	Austria	Wiener Stadthalle
23 April 1986	Rotterdam	Netherlands	Rotterdam Ahoy Sportpaleis
24 April 1986	Rotterdam	Netherlands	Rotterdam Ahoy Sportpaleis
26 April 1986	Brussels	Belgium	Forest National
North America
17 August 1986	Clarkston	United States	Pine Knob Music Theatre
18 August 1986	Clarkston	United States	Pine Knob Music Theatre
19 August 1986	Cuyahoga Falls	United States	Blossom Music Center
21 August 1986	Bonner Springs	United States	Sandstone Amphitheater
22 August 1986	Bloomington	United States	Met Center
23 August 1986	Hoffman Estates	United States	Poplar Creek Music Theater
25 August 1986	Clarkston	United States	Pine Knob Music Theatre
26 August 1986	Toronto	Canada	CNE Grandstand
27 August 1986	Montréal	Canada	Stade Parc Jarry
29 August 1986	Hartford	United States	Hartford Civic Center
30 August 1986	Saratoga Springs	United States	Saratoga Performing Arts Center
31 August 1986	Columbia	United States	Merriweather Post Pavilion
2 September 1986	Philadelphia	United States	The Spectrum
3 September 1986	Worcester	United States	The Centrum
5 September 1986	Worcester	United States	The Centrum
6 September 1986	Worcester	United States	The Centrum
7 September 1986	Providence	United States	Providence Civic Center
8 September 1986	Philadelphia	United States	The Spectrum
11 September 1986	New York City	United States	Madison Square Garden
12 September 1986	New York City	United States	Madison Square Garden
13 September 1986	New York City	United States	Madison Square Garden
14 September 1986	New York City	United States	Madison Square Garden
16 September 1986	Atlanta	United States	Omni Coliseum
19 September 1986	Pembroke Pines	United States	Hollywood Sportatorium
20 September 1986	Tallahassee	United States	Leon County Civic Center
21 September 1986	Tampa	United States	USF Sun Dome
23 September 1986	Antioch	United States	Starwood Amphitheatre
24 September 1986	Memphis	United States	Mid-South Coliseum
26 September 1986	Houston	United States	The Summit
27 September 1986	Dallas	United States	Reunion Arena
30 September 1986	Denver	United States	McNichols Sports Arena
1 October 1986	Salt Lake City	United States	Salt Palace
3 October 1986	Oakland	United States	Oakland Coliseum Arena
4 October 1986	Costa Mesa	United States	Pacific Amphitheatre
7 October 1986	Los Angeles	United States	Universal Amphitheatre
8 October 1986	Los Angeles	United States	Universal Amphitheatre
10 October 1986	Los Angeles	United States	Universal Amphitheatre
11 October 1986	Los Angeles	United States	Universal Amphitheatre
12 October 1986	Los Angeles	United States	Universal Amphitheatre
13 October 1986	Los Angeles	United States	Universal Amphitheatre
14 October 1986	Los Angeles	United States	Universal Amphitheatre
15 October 1986	Los Angeles	United States	Universal Amphitheatre

=== Box office score data ===
Venue	City	Tickets sold / available	Gross revenue (1986)
Pine Knob Music Center	Clarkston, Michigan	48,000 / 48,000 (100%)	$674,520
Poplar Creek Music Theater	Hoffman Estates	24,161 / 24,161 (100%)	$326,000
National Exhibition Grandstand	Toronto	24,298 / 24,298 (100%)	$448,275
The Spectrum	Philadelphia	34,222 / 34,222 (100%)	$562,367
Civic Center	Providence	13,120 / 13,120 (100%)	$229,600
Centrum	Worcester	36,831 / 36,831 (100%)	$613,368
The Omni	Atlanta	14,449 / 14,449 (100%)	$252,858
Leon County Civic Center	Tallahassee	10,768 / 10,768 (100%)	$175,395
Sun Dome	Tampa	10,492 / 10,800 (97%)	$173,188
Mid-South Coliseum	Memphis	9,625 / 12,000 (80%)	$149,188
The Summit	Houston	13,740 / 13,740 (100%)	$240,450
Reunion Arena	Dallas	14,753 / 14,753 (100%)	$258,178
McNichols Sports Arena	Denver	13,845 / 18,365 (75%)	$237,334
Alameda County Coliseum	Oakland	13,745 / 13,745 (100%)	$240,538
Pacific Amphitheater	Costa Mesa	17,872 / 18,764 (95%)	$273,489
TOTAL		299,921 / 308,016 (97%)	$4,854,748

== Personnel ==
- Elton John – lead vocals, piano, acoustic guitar on "Love Song"
- Davey Johnstone – lead guitar, backing vocals
- David Paton – bass guitar
- Fred Mandel – keyboards, rhythm guitar
- Charlie Morgan – drums
- Ray Cooper – percussion (UK leg)
- Jody Linscott – percussion, drums (Europe and North American legs)
- Alan Carvell – backing vocals
- Gordon Neville - backing vocals (Europe and North American legs)
- Helena Springs – backing vocals (UK leg)
- Shirley Lewis – backing vocals
- Onward International Horn Section
