= Lost and Found (David Byron album) =

Studio album by David Byron
- Released: 2003
- Recorded: 1980–1982
- Genre: Hard rock
- Length: ???
- Label: Majestic Rock
- Producer: Gus Dudgeon

David Byron chronology
On the Rocks (1981)	Lost and Found (2003)	That Was Only Yesterday - The Last EP (2008)

Professional ratings
Review scores
Source	Rating
AllMusic	3.5/5 stars
Classic Rock	4/10 stars

Lost And Found is a two-disc album that includes demos and live recordings by the Byron Band which spans two years from 1980 to 1982. It also includes a Robin George solo track.

== Track listing ==
All songs by David Byron and Robin George, except where indicated.

Disc One

Writing Demos Live in London '82

1. "Learn the Dance"
2. "I Need Love"
3. "Fool for a Pretty Face"
4. "Safety in Numbers"
5. "Bad Girl"
6. "One Minute More"

Demo Live Worcester '82

7. "Bad Girl"

Writing at David's House '82

8. "She Was Good"
9. "Fool for a Pretty Face"
10. "She Was a Dream"
11. "She Got Pride"
12. "Untitled Melody"
13. "Learn the Dance"

Disc Two

Rehearsals London '81

1. "How Do You Sleep?"
2. "Safety in Numbers"
3. "I Need Love"
4. "Piece of My Love"
5. "Goodnight Blues"
6. "Last Chance Jam"

Live in Liverpool '80

7. "Bad Girl"
8. "Start Believing"
9. "July Morning" (Ken Hensley, Byron)
10. "How Do You Sleep"
11. "Sweet Lorraine" (Byron, Mick Box, Gary Thain)
12. "Piece of My Love"
13. "Liverpool Blues"
14. "Roll Over Beethoven" (Chuck Berry)

Robin George Solo Track

15. "Angelsong" (George)

== Personnel ==
- David Byron - lead vocals
- Robin George - guitars and background vocals
- Roger Flavelle, Pino Palladino - bass guitars
- Steve Braye, Pete Thompson, Charlie Morgan, John Searer - drums
- Bob Jackson, Pete Green - keyboards
- Mel Collins - saxophone
- Chris Thompson - backing vocals

Production

- Gus Dudgeon - producer
- Robin George - mastering
- Charlie Charlesworth - cover design
- Debra Derryn - paintings
