= Have Mercy on the Criminal =

Song by Elton John

from the album Don't Shoot Me I'm Only the Piano Player
- Released: 22 January 1973 (UK); 26 January 1973 (USA)
- Recorded: June 1972
- Genre: Blues rock
- Length: 5:58
- Label: DJM Records; MCA Records (US/Canada-1975)
- Songwriters: Elton John, Bernie Taupin
- Producer: Gus Dudgeon

"Have Mercy on the Criminal" is a song written by English musician Elton John and songwriter Bernie Taupin, and performed by John.

== Musical structure ==
The song is one of only two songs from the album that features orchestration. Long-time collaborator Paul Buckmaster was responsible for the arrangement. It opens unusually, in the middle of a crescendo, before ending with a snare drum-hit that segues into a slow-paced dramatic ballad that lasts for the rest of the song. A guitar solo is also featured. Upon introducing the song during his orchestral tour of Australia in 1986, John stated that "no one did arrangements like this in those days," claiming "that's why Buckmaster was so great."

Author Mary Anne Cassata praises the song as a "breakthrough stunner," particularly praising Buckmaster's "tense" arrangement and John's "desperate" vocals. Elton John biographer David Buckley believes the song's guitar riff was influenced by that of Derek and the Dominos' "Layla".

== Lyrical meaning ==
The lyrics describe what life is like for an escaped prisoner. The first verses mention "dogs at night chasing some poor criminal", while the last verses mentioning "never seen a friend in years", bookending the theme as being about the escape and recapture of a criminal. The chorus claims "have mercy on the criminal – are you blind to the winds of change – don't you hear them anymore," pleading for tolerance for the criminal on the lam. Author Elizabeth Rosenthal believes the song was influenced by the songs of Rosemary Clooney and Jo Stafford. Phillip Norman traces some of the imagery in the song to stories and B-movies that Taupin was exposed to as a child.

== Performances ==
Bootleg sources prove that it was performed months before the album's release, with the earliest recording being from November 1972. It was performed at practically each show on his 1973 tours, occasionally in 1975. For his 1980 tour, it was a staple, being played during the latter half of every show. It was performed on and off in 1984 as well, and in 1986, with the Melbourne Symphony Orchestra. A live performance was included on the 1987 album Live in Australia with the Melbourne Symphony Orchestra. As with other songs performed at those shows, it also received performances during his 1988–89 World Tour. It was performed in 1995 in the Netherlands, and on his 2002 tour as a staple. It made a brief return in the summer of 2004 during his second orchestral tour. He sparsely performed the song in the 2010s. During the 2022 leg of the Farewell Yellow Brick Road tour, the song was brought back and played regularly at every show.

== Personnel ==
- Elton John – vocals, piano
- Dee Murray – bass
- Nigel Olsson – drums
- Davey Johnstone – electric guitar
- Paul Buckmaster – orchestral arrangement
