= Leather Jackets (album) =

Studio album by Elton John
- Released: 27 October 1986
- Recorded: January 1985, January – February, May – September 1986
- Studios: Wisseloord (Hilversum); CTS (London); The SOL (Cookham)
- Genre: Pop rock
- Length: 45:11
- Labels: Geffen (US), Rocket (UK)
- Producer: Gus Dudgeon

Elton John chronology
Ice on Fire (1985)	Leather Jackets (1986)	Live in Australia with the Melbourne Symphony Orchestra (1987)

Singles from Leather Jackets
- 1. "Heartache All Over the World" Released: September 1986; 2. "Slow Rivers" Released: November 1986; 3. "Hoop of Fire" Released: 1986 (France); 4. "Angeline" Released: February 1987 (Aus); 5. "Paris" Released: March 1987 (EU)

Leather Jackets is the twentieth studio album by British musician Elton John. It was released on 27 October 1986 through Geffen Records in the US and The Rocket Record Company in all other territories. The album is the last of John's to be produced by Gus Dudgeon and includes both newly recorded material and outtakes from John's previous album Ice on Fire (1985).

Recording of the album coincided with a period of personal turmoil for John, including a worsening addiction to cocaine and vocal struggles caused by polyps on John's vocal cords, which would be removed through surgery in 1987, deepening John's voice in the process.

Upon release, Leather Jackets was a critical and commercial failure. The album stalled at number 91 in the US, making it the lowest-charting studio album of John's career, and was his first since Tumbleweed Connection (1970) to not contain a top 40 hit. (Note: No singles were released to promote Tumbleweed Connection) Reviews have been largely negative, and John himself has called the album the worst of his career. Two years later, John reacted to the album's failure with Reg Strikes Back (1988), a self-proclaimed "comeback" album which was much more successful.

== Background ==
In 2001, Elton John regarded the track "Heartache All Over the World" from the album as the worst song he had ever recorded, calling it "pretty insubstantial"; in 2006, he would declare Leather Jackets his least favourite of all his albums, saying "Gus Dudgeon did his best but you can't work with a loony." He would also call its biker-inspired cover "very butch but a total disaster. I was not a well budgie, I was married and it was just one bag of coke after another." In spite of this, lyricist Bernie Taupin believes 1997's The Big Picture deserves the honour of John's worst album.

In 2000, Gus Dudgeon said: "There was a chance he could polish himself off. He'd go out and do some coke and it'd be all over his mouth, his nose would be running and I'd go: 'Oh God, this is just awful'." John has also stated in his 2019 autobiography Me that "it was about as close to an unmitigated disaster than anything I've ever released" and "overall, Leather Jackets had four legs, a tail, and barked if a postman came to the door".

"Heartache All Over the World" was the only single from the album to achieve chart success in the US, though it failed to crack the top 50 of the Billboard Hot 100. "Slow Rivers" was a collaboration with Cliff Richard that was released as a single in the UK. Cher collaborated with "Lady Choc Ice" (actually John himself) to write "Don't Trust That Woman". Roger Taylor and John Deacon of Queen played drums and bass guitar respectively on the track "Angeline"; songwriting credit was shared with backing singer Alan Carvell, who composed the "oh-oh-oh's" that can be heard at the beginning and end of the track.

John played "Paris" during the 1986 leg of his Ice on Fire Tour. The song later became a minor FM hit for some jazz radio stations that programmed the track and reached the Belgium charts, peaking at number 37. He included "Heartache All Over the World" and "Slow Rivers" on his 1986 Australian Tour De Force tour with the Melbourne Symphony Orchestra, which would eventually yield John's 1987 live album Live in Australia with the Melbourne Symphony Orchestra. "Heartache" was included in the band portion of the show (John opted not to play piano for that number) while "Slow Rivers" was played during the second half of the show with the orchestra. Due to contractual constraints, "Slow Rivers" was not included on Live in Australia, despite the fact that it was from the orchestral portion of the show, which was the basis for the album.

To date, Leather Jackets is John's only studio album from the pre-1993 period that has yet to be reissued in remastered form; it last appeared on compact disc in the early 1990s. However, in 2008, it became available for digital download. Two songs from the album, "Hoop of Fire" and "I Fall Apart" were both issued on the Elton: Jewel Box compilation in 2020. As of 2023, Leather Jackets has been remastered on vinyl and is sold on the Elton John website.

== Critical reception ==
Professional ratings
Review scores
Source	Rating
AllMusic	1.5/5 stars
The Encyclopedia of Popular Music	2/5 stars
Los Angeles Times	(negative)
Smash Hits	8/10

The album received negative reviews. Matt Springer of Ultimate Classic Rock placed the album at number 31 in his ranking of all of John's studio albums, criticizing it as "the worst of the '80s – awful songs with equally awful production."

In a retrospective review for AllMusic, Lindsay Planer found the material "half-hearted", performances "less than inspired" and John's voice to be "beginning to show signs of extreme fatigue and strain." They did however find "bright moments" on the album including "Heartache All Over the World" and John's collaborations with Cliff Richard and Cher.

== Track listing ==
All tracks are written by Elton John and Bernie Taupin, except where noted.

Side one
No.	Title	Length
1.	"Leather Jackets"	4:10
2.	"Hoop of Fire"	4:14
3.	"Don't Trust That Woman" (Cher, Lady Choc Ice [John])	4:58
4.	"Go It Alone"	4:26
5.	"Gypsy Heart"	4:46

Side two
No.	Title	Length
1.	"Slow Rivers" (duet with Cliff Richard)	3:13
2.	"Heartache All Over the World"	4:01
3.	"Angeline" (John, Taupin, Alan Carvell)	3:56
4.	"Memory of Love" (John, Gary Osborne)	4:08
5.	"Paris"	4:01
6.	"I Fall Apart"	4:00
Total length:		45:11

- Sides one and two were combined as tracks 1–11 on CD reissues.

Notes

- On the original LP pressing, the Greatest Hits Vol. 3 compilation, and some single releases, the length of "Heartache All Over the World" is 4:01 (incorrectly listed as "3:52" on the album sleeve), while on CD editions, including the 1992 American CD re-release, the version of "Heartache" includes a brief additional a cappella segment during the final chorus, resulting in a length of 4:17.
- Angeline is 3:24 in length on the LP version, but extended to 3:55 on the CD release.

== Personnel ==
Track numbering refers to CD and digital releases of the album.

=== Musicians ===
- Elton John – lead vocals, Yamaha GS1 (1, 8), grand piano (2, 4–6, 10), Roland JX-8P (2, 11), MIDI piano (3), Yamaha CP-80 (11)
- Fred Mandel – synthesizer programming and sequencing (1, 4, 7), Yamaha DX7 (2, 6, 9), Korg DW-8000 (3, 10), Roland JX-8P (4, 11), Roland Jupiter 8 (5, 6, 10, 11), Roland P60 (7, 9), Prophet 2000 (7), Yamaha TX816 Rhodes (10), grand piano (11)
- Davey Johnstone – acoustic guitar (1–5, 7, 9), electric guitar (2–11), backing vocals (2, 4, 5, 7–10)
- David Paton – bass (2, 3, 5, 9–11)
- Paul Westwood – bass (6)
- John Deacon – bass (8)
- Gus Dudgeon – drum programming (1), electronic percussion (1, 4, 7)
- Dave Mattacks – drums (2, 5)
- Charlie Morgan – drums (3, 4, 6, 7, 9–11), electronic percussion (4)
- Roger Taylor – drums (8)
- Graham Dickson – electronic percussion (1, 3, 4, 7)
- Frank Ricotti – percussion (2)
- Jody Linscott – percussion (3), tambourine (7)
- James Newton Howard – string arrangements and conductor (6)
- Martyn Ford – orchestra contractor (6)
- Gavyn Wright – orchestra leader (6)
- Alan Carvell – backing vocals (2, 4, 5, 7–10)
- Katie Kissoon – backing vocals (2)
- Pete Wingfield – backing vocals (2)
- Shirley Lewis – backing vocals (4, 5, 8–10)
- Gordon Neville – backing vocals (4, 5, 7–10)
- Kiki Dee – backing vocals (6)
- Cliff Richard – lead vocals (6)
- Vicki Brown – backing vocals (7)
- Albert Boekholt – Emulator vocals and samples (9)

=== Production ===
- Gus Dudgeon – producer, mixing
- Graham Dickson – mixing, engineer (1, 3, 4, 6, 7, 9–11)
- Stuart Epps – engineer (2, 5, 6, 8)
- Albert Boekholt – assistant engineer
- Ronald Prent – assistant engineer
- Greg Fulginiti – mastering (US release) at Artisan Sound Recorders (North Hollywood, California)
- Steve Brown – coordinator
- Adrian Collee – studio coordinator
- David Costa – art direction
- Andrew Christian – artwork
- Gered Mankowitz – photography
- John Reid – management

== Charts ==
Chart performance for Leather Jackets
Chart (1986–1987)	Peak position
Australian Albums (Kent Music Report)	4
Austrian Albums (Ö3 Austria)	22
Canada Top Albums/CDs (RPM)	38
Dutch Albums (Album Top 100)	34
German Albums (Offizielle Top 100)	21
New Zealand Albums (RMNZ)	34
Norwegian Albums (VG-lista)	12
Swedish Albums (Sverigetopplistan)	31
Swiss Albums (Schweizer Hitparade)	13
UK Albums (Official Charts)	24
US Billboard 200	91

== Certifications and sales ==
Region	Certification	Certified units/sales
New Zealand (RMNZ)	Gold	7,500^{^}
Spain	—	12,000
Switzerland (IFPI Switzerland)	Gold	25,000^{^}
United Kingdom (BPI)	Gold	100,000^{^}
^{^} Shipments figures based on certification alone.
