= Bennie and the Jets =

1974 single by Elton John

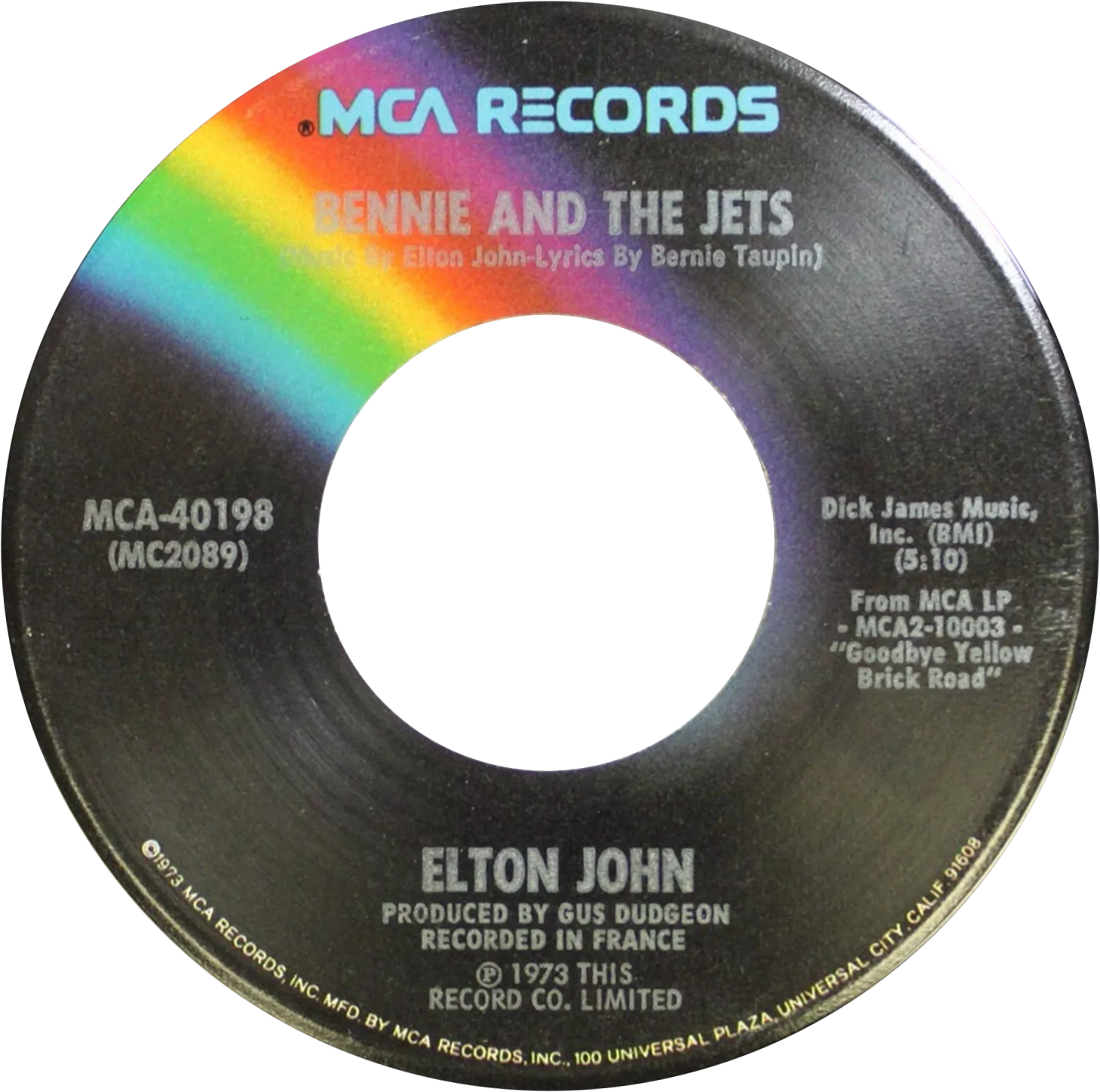
- One of side-A labels of the US single

Single by Elton John

from the album Goodbye Yellow Brick Road
- B-side: "Harmony"
- Released: 4 February 1974
- Recorded: 1973
- Studio: Château d'Hérouville, France
- Genre: Glam rock; R&B
- Length: 5:23
- Label: MCA; DJM
- Composer: Elton John
- Lyricist: Bernie Taupin
- Producer: Gus Dudgeon

Elton John singles chronology
"Step into Christmas" (1973)	"Bennie and the Jets" (1974)	"Candle in the Wind" (1974)

Music video
- "Bennie and the Jets" on YouTube

"Bennie and the Jets" (also titled "Benny & the Jets") is a song written by British musician Elton John and lyricist Bernie Taupin, and performed by John. The song first appeared on the Goodbye Yellow Brick Road album in 1973. "Bennie and the Jets" has been one of John's most popular songs and was performed during his appearance at Live Aid.

The track was a massive hit in the United States and Canada, released in 1974 as an A-side using the spelling "Bennie". In most territories the track was released as the B-side of "Candle in the Wind", using the spelling "Benny". Album artwork (back-cover track listing and center-panel design) consistently lists the song as "Bennie" while either "Bennie" or "Benny" appears on the vinyl album depending on territory. The track was released as an A-side in the UK in 1976, as "Benny and the Jets".

It is ranked number 371 on Rolling Stone's list of The 500 Greatest Songs of All Time.

== Song composition ==
The song tells of "Bennie and the Jets", a fictional band of whom the song's narrator is a fan. In a 2014 Rolling Stone interview, Taupin said, "I saw Bennie and the Jets as a sort of proto-sci-fi punk band, fronted by an androgynous woman, who looks like something out of a Helmut Newton photograph."

Produced by Gus Dudgeon, the song was recorded during the Goodbye Yellow Brick Road sessions in France at Château d'Hérouville's Strawberry Studios, where John and Taupin had recorded their previous two albums Honky Château and Don't Shoot Me I'm Only the Piano Player.

When performing the song live, John rarely plays the studio arrangement, and often makes subtle or even drastic changes, sometimes including phrases from Glenn Miller's "In the Mood" and closing with the five-note combination from John Williams's score for Close Encounters of the Third Kind. During his live performances, the piano solo has been played in all sorts of variations, from very close to the original to wildly improvised and extended versions, such as the elaborate version during his Central Park concert in 1980, the version from his 30 June 1984 Wembley Stadium performance and another take on it during the "Elton and his band" part of the show recorded in Sydney, Australia, on 14 December 1986, his last show before his throat surgery in January 1987.

== Production ==
Despite sounding like a live recording, the song was recorded in studio with live sound effects added later. Producer Gus Dudgeon explained:

For some weird reason, Elton happened to have hit the opening piano chord of the song exactly one bar before the song actually started. So I was doing the mix and this chord kept coming on which you normally wouldn't expect to hear. I turned to engineer [David Hentschel] and I said, 'What does that remind you of? ... It's the sort of thing that people do on stage just before they're going to start a song.' Just to kind of get everybody, 'Okay, here we go, ready?' For some reason that chord being there made me think, 'Maybe we should fake-live this.'

Dudgeon mixed in sounds from a 1972 concert by John at the Royal Festival Hall and a Jimi Hendrix performance at the Isle of Wight Festival 1970. He included a series of whistles from a live concert in Vancouver, and added hand claps and various shouts.

== North American single release ==
The song was the closing track on side one of the double album Goodbye Yellow Brick Road, and John was set against releasing it as a single, believing it would fail. CKLW in Windsor, Ontario, began heavy airplay of the song and it became the No. 1 song in the Detroit market. This attention caused other American and Canadian Top 40 stations to add it to their playlists as well. As a result, the song peaked at No. 1 on the US singles chart in 1974. In the US, it was certified Gold on 8 April 1974 and Platinum on 13 September 1995 by the RIAA, and had sold 2.8 million copies by August 1976.

Cash Box said that "the song is a strong one and worth every second of its 5:10." Record World said that "With Elton showcasing his remarkable voice range, it can't miss grabbing the top spot."

"Bennie and the Jets" was John's first Top 40 hit on what at the time was called the Billboard Hot Soul Singles chart, where it peaked at No. 15, the highest position out of the three of his singles which reached that chart. The acceptance of "Bennie" on R&B radio helped land John, a huge soul music fan, a guest appearance on the 17 May 1975 edition of Soul Train, where he played "Bennie and the Jets" and "Philadelphia Freedom". In Canada, it held the No. 1 spot on the RPM national singles chart for two weeks (13–20 April), becoming his first No. 1 single of 1974 and his fourth overall.

== Personnel ==
- Elton John – piano, Farfisa organ, vocals
- Davey Johnstone – acoustic guitar
- Dee Murray – bass
- Nigel Olsson – drums

== Music video ==
In May 2017, the music video for "Bennie and the Jets" premiered at the Cannes Film Festival as a winner of Elton John: The Cut, a competition organised in partnership with AKQA, Pulse Films, and YouTube in honour of the fiftieth anniversary of his songwriting relationship with Bernie Taupin. The competition called upon independent filmmakers to submit treatments for music videos for one of three Elton John songs from the 1970s, with each song falling within a specific concept category. "Bennie and the Jets" was designated for the choreography category, and was directed by Jack Whiteley and Laura Brownhill. The video was influenced by early cinema and the work of Busby Berkeley, portraying characters as participants on a talent show auditioning for Bennie.

== Charts ==
=== Weekly charts ===
Chart (1974)	Peak position
Australia (Kent Music Report)	5
Canada Top Singles (RPM)	1
France (SNEP)	175
Ireland (IRMA)	18
New Zealand (Listener)	13
US Billboard Hot 100	1
US Hot Soul Singles (Billboard)	15
US Cash Box Top 100	1

Chart (1976)	Peak position
UK Singles Chart	37

Chart (2019)	Peak position
US Hot Rock & Alternative Songs (Billboard)	9

=== Year-end charts ===
Chart (1974)	Rank
Australia (Kent Music Report)	34
Brazil (Crowley)	24
Canada	6
US Billboard Hot 100	9
US Cash Box Top 100	12

== Certifications ==
Region	Certification	Certified units/sales
New Zealand (RMNZ)	4× Platinum	120,000^{‡}
United Kingdom (BPI)	Platinum	600,000^{‡}
United States (RIAA)	4× Platinum	4,000,000^{‡}
^{‡} Sales+streaming figures based on certification alone.

== Covers and interpolations ==
- The Beastie Boys released a cover of this song on their The Sounds of Science album in 1999. The song, titled "Benny and the Jets", was sung by frequent Beastie Boys collaborator Biz Markie, who often mumbles the words while singing. This recording was first released in 1995 as a flexi disc inside of issue two of the Beastie Boys' Grand Royal magazine.
- Ben Folds riffed on both the title and the piano sounds for his song Hiroshima (B B B Benny Hit His Head) off of the 2008 album Way To Normal.
- A Tribe Called Quest continuously samples the lyrics "Gonna hear electric music, solid wall of sound" from "Benny and the Jets" throughout the song "Solid Wall of Sound" from their 2016 album We Got It from Here... Thank You 4 Your Service. John, Busta Rhymes and Jack White are given feature credits on the track.
- Mary J. Blige used many elements from the piano chorus from "Benny and the Jets" on her single "Deep Inside" (from her 1999 album Mary). Because of the extensive use of the piano parts, both Elton John and Bernie Taupin are credited as co-writers of "Deep Inside". An alternative version of the music video for the track features Elton John playing the piano on stage.
- Miguel and rapper Wale recorded a cover of the song for the 2014 reissue of the Goodbye Yellow Brick Road album. Elton John praised their interpretation of "Bennie and the Jets", telling Rolling Stone magazine, "Miguel's done a fantastic job. It really makes the best of what the song is all about."
- Pink recorded a cover of the song with rapper Logic for the album Revamp: Reimagining the Songs of Elton John & Bernie Taupin.
- In Season 21 of American Idol, 25-year-old mother of 3 Sara Beth Liebe performed a cover of "Bennie and The Jets" that put her through to Hollywood. The audition was controversial due to comments made by Katy Perry that were called "Mom Shaming". Liebe eventually left the show. On 6 May 2023, Liebe released a fully produced cover version of "Bennie and The Jets" with producer Fernando Perdomo providing all instrumentation.
- Jacob Lusk from "Gabriels" performs "Bennie And The Jets" as gospel at the 2024 Gershwin Prize for Popular Song concert honoring Elton John and Bernie Taupin at DAR Constitution Hall in Washington, D.C.
- The Fearless Flyers produced an instrumental cover named "Kenni and the Jets" on their 2020 album Tailwinds.
- The song was also featured on the soundtrack to the 1998 movie Sliding Doors and the 2006 film Running With Scissors..
- In 2025 Joy Crookes "unintentionally" used elements from "Bennie and the Jets" for the third song of her album Juniper that is called Carmen. According to the artist it is about "unrealistic beauty standards, and how they’re kicking all our arses" and Elton John "was super supportive about it, and really loves the song". Nevertheless Elton John and Bernie Taupin were honoured at the release with credits as writers.

== Mondegreens in the song ==
The song contains the line "She's got electric boots, a mohair suit", which is often misheard as "She's got electric boobs, and mohair shoes". A scene in the film 27 Dresses shows that this is but one of many mondegreens that listeners have invented for this song.
