= Ice on Fire =

1985 studio album by Elton John

Studio album by Elton John
- Released: 4 November 1985
- Studios: The Sol (Cookham); CTS Studios (Wembley)
- Genre: Pop
- Length: 45:17
- Labels: Rocket (UK); Geffen (US)
- Producer: Gus Dudgeon

Elton John chronology
Breaking Hearts (1984)	Ice on Fire (1985)	Leather Jackets (1986)

Singles from Ice on Fire
- 1. "Nikita" Released: 4 October 1985; 2. "Wrap Her Up" Released: October 1985; 3. "Cry to Heaven" Released: February 1986

Ice on Fire is the nineteenth studio album by the British musician Elton John. It was released on 4 November 1985 through Geffen Records in North America and The Rocket Record Company elsewhere. Stemming from a desire for a change in sound, John fired the rhythm section of Dee Murray and Nigel Olsson, both of whom had performed on the preceding two albums, and opted to use multiple lineups of session musicians, including Fred Mandel, David Paton, and Charlie Morgan, as well as guest appearances by Sister Sledge, George Michael, and members of Queen. The album was recorded at The Sol in Cookham, Berkshire, and was John's first since Blue Moves (1976) to be produced by Gus Dudgeon.

In comparison to the pop rock sound of previous albums, Ice on Fire contains elements of soul and rhythm and blues music, while also exhibiting a contemporary 1980s sound emphasizing synthesizers and electronic percussion. Bernie Taupin's lyrics explore both personal and political themes, such as war ("Cry to Heaven"), the economic decline of working-class communities ("This Town"), and the Cold War themes of "Nikita". A duet with Millie Jackson, "Act of War", was included as a bonus track on CD and cassette editions of the album.

Ice on Fire was released to mixed commercial success. The album's first two singles—"Nikita" and "Wrap Her Up"—were successful, with the former reaching the top 10 in the US and UK, and the latter reaching the top 20 in both territories as well. The album itself reached number three in the UK, and has since received a Platinum certification by the BPI. However, the album was John's lowest-charting up to that point in the US, where it stalled at number 48, though it was eventually certified Gold by the RIAA. Reviews were mixed, and retrospective assessments of John's catalogue tend to rank the album near the bottom of his discography.

== Background ==
John's previous two albums, Too Low for Zero (1983) and Breaking Hearts (1984) featured the original Elton John Band lineup of Davey Johnstone on guitar, Dee Murray on bass, and Nigel Olsson on drums. Both albums symbolized a comeback for John after a string of less successful albums and singles throughout the late 1970s and early 1980s. However, the tour for Breaking Hearts proved to be grueling, with one show being cancelled after John collapsed backstage from a viral infection. After this tour, John had tired of live performances and made the decision to dismiss Murray and Olsson from the band, desiring a change in sound.

== Writing and recording ==
Elton was a workaholic. Sessions would normally start at 10 AM. Elton was there when I arrived and he would still be there at the piano when I left. He had more enthusiasm for his work than a man half his age.

— David Paton

Inspired by Tina Turner's massively successful Private Dancer (1984) album, John decided to utilise multiple rhythm sections for his next album rather than a single band lineup. Ultimately, four unique rhythm sections would contribute to the recording of Ice on Fire. The album's first two tracks, "This Town" and "Cry to Heaven", as well as "Wrap Her Up", featured drummer Charlie Morgan (who had previously worked with Air Supply and Cyndi Lauper, among others) and bassist Paul Westwood. The latter song, which also featured prominent vocals from George Michael, was borne out of a full-band jam session, leading to Morgan and Westwood, as well as Johnstone and Mandel, receiving writing credits. "Soul Glove", "Satellite", and the CD and cassette-only "Act of War" utilised the rhythm section of Mel Gaynor (drums) and Deon Estus, while "Too Young" featured John Deacon and Roger Taylor of Queen. Drummer Dave Mattacks and bassist David Paton (previously successful as a member of the band Pilot) appear on the tracks "Nikita", "Tell Me What the Papers Say", and "Candy by the Pound". Other musicians appearing on the album include guitarist Nik Kershaw, keyboardist Fred Mandel, and Kiki Dee, who provides backing vocals.

Though John had originally intended to work with producer Chris Thomas, he was unavailable, already working with INXS at the time. John also asked Trevor Horn to produce, who was interested but ultimately too busy. Instead, John reunited with Gus Dudgeon, whom he had not worked with since Blue Moves in 1976. Recording commenced in the spring of 1985 at Sol Studios in Cookham, Berkshire. It proved to be a very prolific period for John; in a May 1985 interview, John claimed to have already recorded eighteen songs for the new album, while also stating his desire to record additional material. Paton and Mattacks began recording "Nikita" on the first day of the sessions, a song which would also feature Michael on backing vocals and Kershaw on guitar. Upon learning that Sister Sledge would be performing in England, John pursued the group to have them perform on "This Town"; John would approach Millie Jackson in a similar fashion for "Act of War". "Soul Glove" was originally written for Kiki Dee, who contributes backing vocals on the track. Some material left over from the sessions would be included on John's next album, Leather Jackets (1986). "Shoot Down the Moon" was submitted as a potential theme for the James Bond film A View to a Kill (1985), being passed over in favor of Duran Duran.

== Music and lyrics ==
Elizabeth Rosenthal, author of His Song: The Musical Journey of Elton John, considers Ice on Fire to be John's "first genuine soul album of the 1980s." Jeff Giles of Ultimate Classic Rock characterizes John's sound at the time of the album as a "mechanized strain of soul and R&B", while AllMusic's Stephen Thomas Erlewine describes the album's aesthetic as "pure 1985, heavy on synthetic drums and keyboards". Rosenthal also notes a "huskiness" to John's voice throughout the album, an early sign of the vocal issues that would result in John's 1987 surgery. The album opens with "This Town", a commentary on the decline of the United States' Rust Belt. The lyrics' "images of despair" are juxtaposed against upbeat music which includes a horn section as well as vocal exchanges between John and Sister Sledge displaying elements of gospel music. "Cry to Heaven" takes place in an unidentified war-torn area, and reflects the hopelessness felt by the innocent citizens affected by the conflict. Rosenthal considers the song to be a showcase for the newfound "raggedness" in John's voice, while the "spare" arrangement, consisting primarily of piano, bass, percussion and synthesizer, reflects a "sense of despair and desolation".

Conversely, "Soul Glove" is an upbeat love song, using the metaphor of a "tight-fitting glove" to demonstrate the compatibility of the two partners. As implied by the title, the song exhibits a strong soul music influence, with a prominent horn section. "Nikita", the album's best-known song, is a ballad sung from the point of view of a man who has fallen in love with a Soviet border guard, whom he knows he can never be with. Judy Parkinson, author of Elton: Made in England (2003), calls the track "an evocative love song to a lonely East European girl". Rosenthal likens the song to John's earlier song "Daniel" (1973), and also cites it as another example of John's "huskier" voice and increased use of a lower register on the album. It has been noted that despite being known primarily as a female name in the US, Nikita is a traditionally male name in Russia. The album's first side closes with "Too Young", narrated by a man in love with a woman whose parents disapprove of the relationship, due to their age gap. John likened the song to 1960s torch songs in the vein of the Righteous Brothers. Shana Naomi Krochmal of Vulture compares the song's "creepy" theme to that of George Michael's later hit single "Father Figure" (1987), while musically, Rosenthal notes the influence of The Righteous Brothers' "You've Lost That Lovin' Feelin'" (1964).

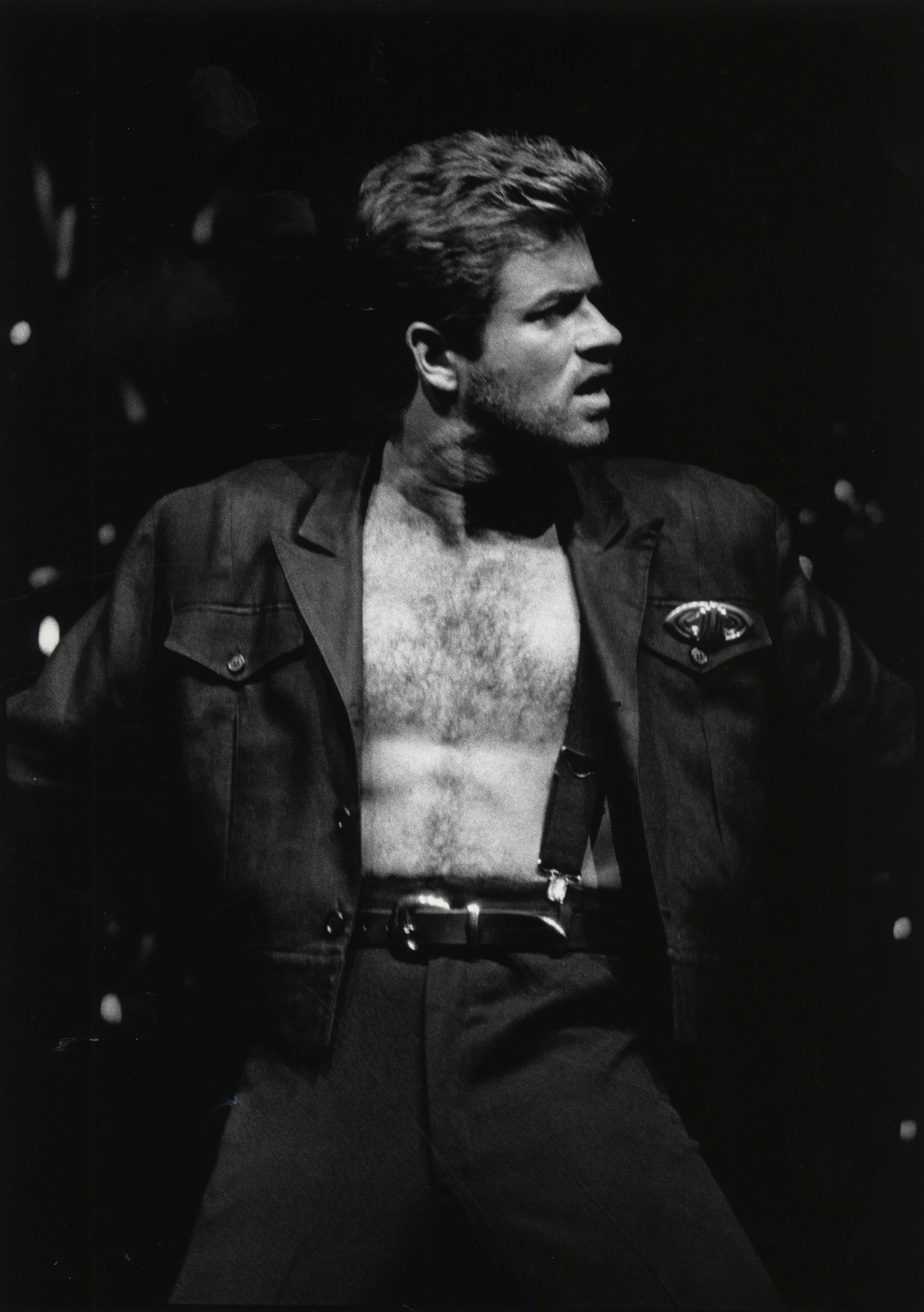
"Nikita" and "Wrap Her Up", Ice on Fire's two most popular songs, feature guest vocals from George Michael (pictured 1988).

Side two opens with "Wrap Her Up", a dance track which Rosenthal considers "one of Elton and Bernie's silliest and most jocund collaborations." Krochmal calls the song "an absolutely unhinged Wham! rap camp romp with a bridge as nonsensical as Madonna's "Vogue". "Satellite" is another track with a notable soul influence, while Rosenthal also notes elements of funk and "space-age" sound effects from Mandel's keyboards and Johnstone's guitar. "Tell Me What the Papers Say" is a criticism of tabloids, with John stating: "basically, [the song says] that most newspapers are lying bastards." Rosenthal describes the song as a "mocking, good-time party tune", with John's piano riffs displaying the influence of Jerry Lee Lewis and Little Richard. "Candy by the Pound" has been likened to "an old Miracles song" by John, while Rosenthal states that John's "deep weathered voice" contrasts with the "high, warbly voice for which Smokey Robinson was known". Krochmal notes a contrast between the "cloyingly sweet" mood of the song and lyrics which "slander an ex-girlfriend who won't leave him [John]/Bernie alone".

"Shoot Down the Moon", which closes the vinyl version of the album, is sparser than the preceding tracks, featuring none of the four rhythm sections. John is accompanied only by Pino Palladino on bass and a "faux string" synthesizer arrangement. The song includes "classically tinged" chord progressions, as well as lyrical references to bullets and what Rosenthal refers to as "Bond-[esque] enigma". Included on the original CD and cassette is "Act of War", a duet with Millie Jackson. Jeff Giles of Ultimate Classic Rock considers the track to be "one of Elton's more musically aggressive" songs from the 1980s, while also noting the appearance of the soul and R&B influences present on the album proper. Rosenthal considers the track to be an update of John's earlier "Hard Luck Story" (from Rock of the Westies (1975)), depicting a conflict between a married couple. Musically, the track features "aggressive" guitar and a "percussive, minimalist" melody.

== Release and reception ==
=== Commercial performance ===
Prior to the release of the album, "Act of War" was released as a single to only minor success, peaking at number 32 in the UK and failing to chart in the US. In the UK, "Nikita" was released as the first single in promotion of the album on 4 October 1985, while in the US, "Wrap Her Up" was chosen as the lead single instead. "Nikita" would become John's biggest hit in his home country since the 1970s, peaking at number three. The song was also successful in the US (where it was the album's second single and biggest hit), reaching number seven. A music video was filmed for the song (directed by Ken Russell) portraying a love story between John and a Russian female border guard. "Wrap Her Up" was also moderately successful, peaking at number 20 in the US and number 12 in the UK, while "Cry to Heaven", the album's third and final single, stalled at number 47 in the UK.

Ice on Fire was released on 4 November 1985. Despite the success of the album's singles, it became John's lowest-charting album in the US at the time, stalling at number 48. John, whose relationship with David Geffen had become strained at the time, would blame Geffen Records' lack of promotion for the album's low sales in the US. However, the album did remain on the chart for twenty-eight weeks and was certified Gold by the RIAA. The record fared much better in the UK, where it peaked at number three, becoming John's third top-ten album in a row and stayed on the chart for twenty-three weeks.

=== Critical reception ===
Professional ratings
Review scores
Source	Rating
AllMusic	2.5/5 stars
The Encyclopedia of Popular Music	3/5 stars
Smash Hits	5.5/10

Ice on Fire received mixed reviews upon release. In a review for Rolling Stone, Rob Hoerburger criticized the album for lacking a "foundation of personal style", as well as what he felt were "distant and heavy-handed" piano performances. Hoerburger also called Taupin's lyrics to "This Town" "mindless" and "unsympathetic", while describing "Too Young" as "silly and ironic". However, he did reserve praise for "Nikita", which he compared to "Daniel" as "sure-voiced and emotional", and "Wrap Her Up", which he called "considerably more appealing" than the "empty calories [George Michael's group] Wham! usually serves up." Steve Bush of Smash Hits gave the album a rating of 5 1/2 out of 10, reserving praise for "Shoot Down the Moon" and "Nikita" but otherwise lamenting the lack of slower ballads on the album and criticizing its more upbeat material.

Retrospective reviews of Ice on Fire are slightly more positive. In a review for AllMusic, Stephen Thomas Erlewine stated that while the album is "hardly a masterpiece", it is "still an enjoyable record" and "living proof of the power of professionalism." While lamenting that much of the material "never rises to the level of memorable", Erlewine finds the "state-of-the-art" production to be, while dated, "sort of fun, in a way, since it instantly brings back its era." However, rankings of John's discography still tend to place Ice on Fire towards the bottom. Ultimate Classic Rock ranked the album 31st (out of 34), arguing that the two hit singles did not compensate for its otherwise "lightweight" material. Similarly, Spin placed the album at number 35 (out of 42, including soundtracks and select compilations), stating that "Nikita" and "Wrap Her Up" were not "really worthy of being the duo [of John and George Michael]'s only studio collaborations."

== Track listing ==
All tracks are written by Elton John and Bernie Taupin, except "Wrap Her Up", written by John, Taupin, Davey Johnstone, Fred Mandel, Charlie Morgan, and Paul Westwood, and "The Man Who Never Died", written by John.

Side one
No.	Title	Length
1.	"This Town"	3:54
2.	"Cry to Heaven"	4:14
3.	"Soul Glove"	3:28
4.	"Nikita"	5:42
5.	"Too Young"	5:10
Total length:		22:28

Side two
No.	Title	Length
1.	"Wrap Her Up"	6:05
2.	"Satellite"	3:56
3.	"Tell Me What the Papers Say"	3:40
4.	"Candy by the Pound"	3:54
5.	"Shoot Down the Moon"	4:58
Total length:		22:49 45:17

Initial CD and cassette pressings
No.	Title	Length
11.	"Act of War" (with Millie Jackson)	4:43
Total length:		50:00

1998 reissue (The Classic Years)
No.	Title	Length
11.	"The Man Who Never Died" (1985 remix by Gus Dudgeon)	5:13
12.	"Restless" (live)	4:26
13.	"Sorry Seems to Be the Hardest Word" (live)	3:23
14.	"I'm Still Standing" (live)	4:52
Total length:		63:11

Notes:

- Later CD pressings of the album contain extended versions of "Wrap Her Up" and "Satellite", with durations of 6:21 and 4:37, respectively.
- While all live tracks on the 1998 reissue are listed as being from a 1984 concert at Wembley Stadium, "Sorry Seems to Be the Hardest Word" actually originates from a 1977 performance.

== Personnel ==
Adapted from the liner notes:

=== Musicians ===
- Elton John – vocals, grand piano (1–3, 8, 10, 11), Yamaha GS piano (4, 5), synthesizers (4, 7, 9), Yamaha TX816 (11)
- Fred Mandel – synthesizers (1, 4, 5, 10), keyboards (2, 3, 6–8), sequencers (6), electric guitar (7), finger clicks (7), arrangements (10), Roland Jupiter-8 (11), Yamaha DX7 (11), guitars (11)
- Davey Johnstone – electric guitar (1, 3, 5, 6, 8, 9), Spanish guitar (2), synth guitar (2, 7), backing vocals (3–9), guitars (11)
- Nik Kershaw – electric guitar (4, 7), guitars (11)
- Paul Westwood – bass (1, 2, 6)
- Deon Estus – bass (3, 7, 11)
- David Paton – bass (4, 8, 9)
- John Deacon – bass (5)
- Pino Palladino – bass (10)
- Charlie Morgan – drums (1, 2, 6)
- Mel Gaynor – drums (3, 7, 11)
- Dave Mattacks – drums (4, 8, 9), military snare (5)
- Roger Taylor – drums (5)
- Gus Dudgeon – Simmons drums (5, 11), arrangements (10)
- Frank Ricotti – congas (3), tambourine (3), shakers (3), timpanis (5), cymbals (5), vibraphone (9)
- James Newton Howard – string arrangements (3, 6)
- Sister Sledge – backing vocals (1)
- Alan Carvell – backing vocals (3, 5, 7–9)
- Kiki Dee – backing vocals (3, 5, 6, 8, 9)
- Katie Kissoon – backing vocals (3, 5, 6, 8, 9)
- Pete Wingfield – backing vocals (3, 5–9)
- George Michael – backing vocals (4), featured vocal (6)
- Millie Jackson – vocals (11)

Onward International Horns (Tracks 1, 3, 6 & 9)

- David Bitelli – horn arrangements
- Gus Dudgeon – horn arrangements (3, 6)
- Rick Taylor – horn arrangements (9)

Horn players

- David Bitelli – tenor saxophone (1, 3, 6), baritone saxophone (1, 6, 9)
- Bob Sydor – tenor saxophone (3)
- Phil Todd – alto saxophone (6)
- Pete Thomas – tenor saxophone (9)
- Nick Pentelow – tenor saxophone (9)
- Rick Taylor – trombone, bass trombone (3)
- Chris Pyne – trombone (9)
- Raul D'Oliviera – trumpets (1, 3, 6, 9)
- Paul Spong – trumpets (1, 3, 6, 9)

=== Production ===
- Gus Dudgeon – producer, mixing, editing
- Stuart Epps – recording
- Graham Dickson – mixing, editing
- Tom Pearce – mix assistant, editing assistant
- Gordon Vicary – mastering at The Townhouse (London, UK)
- Terry O'Neill – photography
- David Larkham – design
- John Reid – management

== Charts ==
=== Weekly charts ===
Weekly chart performance for Ice on Fire
Chart (1985–1986)	Peak position
Australian Albums (Kent Music Report)	2
Austrian Albums (Ö3 Austria)	9
Canada Top Albums/CDs (RPM)	11
Dutch Albums (Album Top 100)	6
German Albums (Offizielle Top 100)	5
Italian Albums (Musica e Dischi)	22
New Zealand Albums (RMNZ)	8
Norwegian Albums (VG-lista)	2
Spanish Albums (Spanish Albums Chart)	6
Swedish Albums (Sverigetopplistan)	16
Swiss Albums (Schweizer Hitparade)	2
UK Albums (Official Charts)	3
US Billboard 200	48

=== Year-end charts ===
1985 year-end chart performance for Ice on Fire
Chart (1985)	Position
Australian Albums (Kent Music Report)	77
UK Albums Chart (OCC)	45

1986 year-end chart performance for Ice on Fire
Chart (1986)	Position
Austrian Albums (Ö3 Austria Top 40)	19
Canada Top Albums/CDs (RPM)	56
Swiss Albums (Swiss Hitparade)	3
US Billboard 200	97

== Certifications ==
Certifications and sales for Ice on Fire
Region	Certification	Certified units/sales
Austria (IFPI Austria)	Gold	25,000^{*}
Belgium (BRMA)	Gold	25,000^{*}
France (SNEP)	Gold	100,000^{*}
Germany (BVMI)	Gold	250,000^{^}
Netherlands (NVPI)	Gold	80,000
New Zealand (RMNZ)	Platinum	15,000^{^}
Spain	—	48,500
Sweden (GLF)	Platinum	100,000^{^}
Switzerland (IFPI Switzerland)	2× Platinum	100,000^{^}
United Kingdom (BPI)	Platinum	300,000^{^}
United States (RIAA)	Gold	500,000^{^}
^{*} Sales figures based on certification alone.^{^} Shipments figures based on certification alone.
