= Slow Rivers =

Single by Elton John and Cliff Richard

from the album Leather Jackets
- B-side: "Billy and the Kids"; "Lord of the Flies"
- Released: 17 November 1986
- Genre: Pop
- Length: 3:13
- Label: Rocket
- Songwriter(s): Elton John; Bernie Taupin
- Producer(s): Gus Dudgeon

Elton John singles chronology
"Heartache All Over the World" (1986)	"Slow Rivers" (1986)	"Flames of Paradise" (1987)

Cliff Richard singles chronology
"All I Ask of You" (1986)	"Slow Rivers" (1986)	"My Pretty One" (1987)

"Slow Rivers" is a duet recorded by British singers Elton John and Cliff Richard, released as a single in 1986. Written by John and Bernie Taupin, the song was included on John's 1986 album Leather Jackets.

== Commercial reception ==
The single peaked at number 44 in the singers' native United Kingdom, but was a bigger hit in Belgium and Ireland, where it reached number 24 and number 25 respectively.

== Music video ==
The video for "Slow Rivers" was directed by Mike Brady.

== Track listings ==
UK 7" single

1. "Slow Rivers" – 3:08
2. "Billy and the Kids" – 4:22

UK 12" single

1. "Slow Rivers" – 3:08
2. "Billy and the Kids" – 4:22
3. "Lord of the Flies" – 4:30

== Charts ==
Chart (1986)	Peak position
Australian Singles Chart	82
Belgium (Ultratop 50 Flanders)	24
Ireland (IRMA)	25
New Zealand (Recorded Music NZ)	42
UK Singles (OCC)	44
