= Charlie Morgan (musician) =

English musician and singer-songwriter (born 1955)

- Born: John Charles Morgan; 9 August 1955 (age 71); Hammersmith, London, England
- Genre: Rock
- Occupations: Musician; singer; songwriter
- Instruments: Drums; percussion; vocals
- Years active: 1970–present

John Charles Morgan (born 9 August 1955) is an English musician, singer and songwriter.

== Early years ==
Charlie Morgan was born in Hammersmith, London. He was educated at Chiswick & Bedford Park Preparatory School and Latymer Upper School, where he learnt piano for two years. He became professional in 1973.

== Music career ==
By the mid-1980s, Charlie Morgan had become one of the top session drummers in the UK. In the 1980s he played on albums by artists including Elton John, Gary Moore, Justin Hayward, Kate Bush, Roy Harper, Pete Townshend, Judie Tzuke, Clannad, Tracey Ullman and Nik Kershaw. He was also the drummer in Gary Moore and Phil Lynott's video "Out in the Fields".

In 1985 his drumming work with Nik Kershaw attracted the attention of Elton John, who booked him to play on his Ice on Fire album. Later that year John invited him to play with his band at Live Aid. This was the start of a thirteen-year period of recording and touring with John.

Morgan co-wrote the theme music to the ITV TV series The Bill, with bassist Andy Pask.

== Discography ==
=== Studio albums ===
- Lionheart (1978) - Kate Bush
- Shoot the Moon (1982) - Judie Tzuke
- Work of Heart (1982) - Roy Harper
- Human Racing (1984) - Nik Kershaw
- The Riddle (1984) - Nik Kershaw
- Ya viene el Sol (1984) - Mecano
- Hounds of Love (1985) – Kate Bush
- Ice on Fire (1985) – Elton John
- Flans - Flans (1985)
- Music from the Edge of Heaven (1986) - Wham!
- Leather Jackets (1986) – Elton John
- Reg Strikes Back (1988) – Elton John
- The Sensual World (1989) – Kate Bush
- Oltre (1990) - Claudio Baglioni
- In ogni senso (1991) - Eros Ramazzotti
- Left Hand Talking (1991) - Judie Tzuke
- The Red Shoes (1993) - Kate Bush
- Great Expectations (1993) - Tasmin Archer
- Made in England (1995) – Elton John
- The Big Picture (1997) – Elton John
- Flowers in the Dirt (1997) - Paul McCartney
- I Hear Talk (2004) - Bucks Fizz
- Franco American Swing (2004) - John Jorgenson
- Lost and Found (2004) - David Byron Band
- Beneath the Olympian Skies (2006) - Jim Wilson
- 4th Estate (2006) - James Litherland
- e2 (2007) - Eros Ramazzotti
- The Greatest Songs of the Eighties (2008) - Barry Manilow
- Inusual (2010) - Yuri
- Run from the Wildfire (2010) - Rococo
- Ghosts of the Good (2011) - Waterfront
- Dangerous Music II (2015) - Robin George
- Painful Kiss (2016) - Robin George
- Frankie Miller's Double Take (2016) - Various Artists
- Time to Try (2023) -

The Hoffman Brothers; All Ears

=== Live albums ===
- Live in Australia with the Melbourne Symphony Orchestra (1986) – Elton John

=== Compilation albums ===
- Elton John's Greatest Hits Vol. 3 (1987) – Elton John
- To Be Continued... (1990) – Elton John
- The Very Best of Elton John (1990) – Elton John
- Greatest Hits 1976–1986 (1992) – Elton John
- Love Songs (1995) – Elton John
- Greatest Hits 1970–2002 (2002) – Elton John
- The Greatest Songs of the Eighties (2008) – Barry Manilow

=== Soundtracks ===
- Mad Max Beyond Thunderdome (1985) – Maurice Jarre
- Thelma & Louise (1991) – Hans Zimmer
- Kiss of Death (1995) – Trevor Jones
- Tomorrow Never Dies (1997) – David Arnold
- G.I. Jane (1997) – Trevor Jones
- Dancer in the Dark (1999) – Bjork
- Quantum of Solace (2008) – David Arnold

=== Video ===
- Elton John: Live in Barcelona (1992) – Elton John
- Orleans: Official History & Music (2009) – Orleans

=== TV appearances ===
- Elton John in Australia (1987) – Elton John
- An Audience with Elton John (1997) – Elton John

=== Live performances ===
- Elton John (13 July 1985)

==== Concert tours ====
- Ice on Fire Tour – Elton John (1985–1986)
- Tour De Force – Elton John (1986)
- Sleeping with the Past Tour – Elton John (1989–1990)
- The One Tour – Elton John (1992–1993)
- Face to Face 1994 - Elton John & Billy Joel (1994)
- Face to Face 1995 – Elton John & Billy Joel (1995)
- Made in England Tour – Elton John (1995)
- The Big Picture Tour – Elton John (1997)

==== Miscellaneous performances ====
- Live Aid London, Wembley Stadium – Elton John, Wham! (13 July 1985)

== Personal life ==
He currently lives in Nashville, Tennessee, US.

== See also ==
- List of drummers
