= Robin George =

British singer, songwriter and musician (1956–2024)

- Born: Robin Charles George Sidebotham; 8 April 1956; Wolverhampton, Staffordshire, England
- Died: 26 April 2024 (aged 68) Málaga, Spain
- Genre: Rock
- Occupations: Musician; singer; songwriter; producer
- Instruments: Guitar; vocals
- Years active: 1980s–2024
- Labels: Bronze; Angel Air; Majestic Rock
- Formerly of: The Byron Band
- Website: www.robingeorge.co.uk

Robin Charles George Sidebotham (8 April 1956 – 26 April 2024) was a British rock guitarist, singer, songwriter, composer and producer, born in Wolverhampton, Staffordshire (now the West Midlands).

He achieved success during 1985 with the song "Heartline", which peaked at No. 68 in the UK Singles Chart, No. 92 in the US Billboard Hot 100 and No. 40 in the Mainstream Rock chart. The single was featured on George's debut album Dangerous Music (1984).

George collaborated with several artists during his career including David Byron, Phil Lynott, Glenn Hughes, Robert Plant, John Wetton and Magnum. George died on 26 April 2024, at the age of 68.

Other works included working with David Lowe, composing the title music to BBC Midlands Today and its East Midlands equivalent programme in 1991.

== Selected discography ==
=== Solo releases ===
- The History 12" (1983)
- Dangerous Music (1985)
- Rock of Ageists (2001)
- Dangerous Music Live '85 (2004)
- Bluesongs (2004)
- Crying Diamonds (2006)
- Dangerous Music II (2015)
- Rogue Angels (2018)
- Wilderness (2021)
- Ace In My Hand (2023) l

=== Collaborative Releases ===
- You (2012) (with Vix)
- Overcome (2023) (with Glenn Hughes; previously unofficially released as 'Sweet Revenge')
