= Paul Westwood =

British bassist

Paul Westwood (born 1953) is an English bass player, composer, educator and author.

== Discography ==
Year	Album	Performer
1980	Off Centre	Gilbert O'Sullivan, (feat: bass guitarist,)
1980	Little Dreamer	Peter Green, (feat: bass guitarist,)
1980	Chas Jankel	Chas Jankel, (feat: bass guitarist,)
1981	Whatcha Gonna Do?	Peter Green, (feat: bass guitarist,)
1981	Blue Guitar	Peter Green, (feat: bass guitarist,)
1981	Making Your Mind Up	Bucks Fizz, (feat: bass guitarist)
1982	Now You See Me... Now You Don't	Cliff Richard, (feat: bass guitarist)
1982	Hooked on Classics, Vol 1: Can't Stop the Classics	Royal Philharmonic Orchestra, (feat: bass guitarist)
1982	Hooked on Classics Vol 2: Can't Stop the Classics	Louis Clark, (feat: bass guitarist)
1983	The Kids from Fame Live!	Kids From Fame (feat: bass guitarist)
1983	Bass Patterns	Paul Westwood, (feat: bass guitarist, soloist, composer)
1983	The Guitar Is the Song	John Williams, (feat: bass guitarist)
1983	Strange Day in Berlin	Sally Oldfield, (feat: bass guitarist)
1983	Play On	John Miles, (feat: bass guitarist)
1983	Off the Record	Neil Innes, (feat: bass guitarist)
1983	Human Racing	Nik Kershaw, (feat: bass guitarist)
1984	Dealer	Paul Westwood, (feat: bass guitarist, soloist, composer)
1984	Breakdance	Paul Westwood, (feat: bass guitarist, soloist, composer)
1984	Bass Moods Volume 2	Paul Westwood, (feat: bass guitarist, soloist, composer)
1984	Bass Moods Volume 1	Paul Westwood, (feat: bass guitarist, soloist, composer)
1984	Sneaking Up	Paul Westwood, (feat: bass guitarist, soloist, composer)
1984	Jennifer Rush	Jennifer Rush, (feat: bass guitarist)
1984	Night Cruisin	Paul Westwood, (feat: bass guitarist, soloist, composer)
1984	You Caught Me Out	Tracey Ullman, (feat: bass guitarist)
1985	Kerb Crawler	Paul Westwood, (feat: bass guitarist, soloist, composer)
1985	Side Kick	Paul Westwood (feat: bass guitarist, soloist composer)
1985	Ice on Fire	Elton John, (feat: bass guitarist, composer)
1986	Reflex	Paul Westwood, (feat: bass guitarist, soloist, composer)
1986	Easy Living	Paul Westwood, (feat: bass guitarist, soloist, composer)
1986	Reflex (Remixes)	Paul Westwood, (feat: bass guitarist, soloist, composer)
1986	Leather Jackets	Elton John, (feat: bass guitarist)
1986	Labyrinth[From the Original Soundtrack of the Jim Henson Film]	Trevor Jones, (feat: bass guitarist)
1986	Moonlight Shadows	The Shadows, (feat: bass guitarist)
1986	Close Enough For Love	Andy Williams, (feat: bass guitarist)
1987	Greatest Hits, Vol. 3 (1979-1987)	Elton John, (feat: bass guitarist, composer)
1987	After Dark	Paul Westwood (feat: bass guitarist, soloist, composer)
1988	A Little Light Relief	Paul Westwood & Alan Parker, (feat: bass guitarist, soloist, composer)
1988	Jazz Horizons: Best of M.A. Music, Vol. 1	(feat: bass guitarist)
1989	My Kind of Music	Ron Goodwin, (feat: bass guitarist)
1989	Mancini Rocks the Pops	Henry Mancini, (feat: bass guitarist)
1991	Light & Latin	Elena Duran, (feat: bass guitarist)
1991	En el Ultimo Lugar del Mundo	Ricardo Montaner, (feat: bass guitarist)
1992	The Best of Benny Hill	Benny Hill, (feat: bass guitarist)
1992	Obsesiones	Yuri, (feat: bass guitarist)
1992	Hooked on Classics [Box]	Royal Philharmonic Orchestra, (feat: bass guitarist)
1992	Greatest Hits(1976-1986)	Elton John, (feat: bass guitarist, composer)
1995	Si, Viaggiare	Lucio Battisti, (feat: bass guitarist)
1995	Anthology	Nik Kershaw, (feat: bass guitarist)
1996	Showcase: The Musicals	BBC Concert Orchestra, (feat: bass guitarist)
1996	Matthew Fisher/Strange Days	Matthew Fisher (musician), (feat: bass guitarist)
1997	Lady Saxophone	Barbara Thompson's Paraphernalia, (feat: bass guitarist, soloist)
1998	Con Ganas	Camilo Sesto, (feat: bass guitarist)
1998	Blues for Dhyana	Peter Green, (feat: bass guitarist)
1999	Shifting Sands	Barbara Thompson's Paraphernalia, (feat: bass guitarist, soloist)
1999	Latin & Light	Elena Duran, (feat: bass guitarist)
2000	El Alquimista (The Alchemist)	Artist Juan Martin, (feat: bass guitarist)
2000	Blues Britannia	(feat: bass guitarist, soloist, composer)
2002	Takes on the Hits	Tracey Ullman, (feat: bass guitarist)
2003	In the Eye of the Storm	Barbara Thompson's Paraphernalia, (feat: bass guitarist, soloist, composer)]
2005	ITV 50: The Album	feat: bass guitarist, composer
2007	My Occupation	Chas Jankel, (feat: bass guitarist)
2016	The Guitarist	John Williams, (feat: guitarron)
2017	Boxing the Shadows	The Shadows (band)|Feat:bass guitarist]]
2018	Loving the Alien (1983-1988)	David Bowie (musician)|Feat:bass guitarist]]
2019	The Earth Born	Paul Westwood’s Jazz FX

== Filmography ==
=== Film ===
- The World is Full of Married Men (1979) for composers Bugatti and Musker
- Lost and Found (1979) for composer John Cameron
- The Legend of the Lone Ranger (1981) for composer John Barry
- Never Say Never Again (1983) for composer Michel Legrand
- Joyeuses Paques (Happy Easter) (1984) for composer Philippe Sarde
- Hors-La-Loi (Outlaws) (1985) for composer Philippe Sarde
- Sid and Nancy (1986) for the Sex Pistols
- Labyrinth (1986) for composer Trevor Jones, David Bowie
- Evita (1996) for composers Tim Rice and Andrew Lloyd Webber
- Little Voice (1998) for composer John Altman
- The Life and Death of Peter Sellers (2004) for composer Richard Hartley
- Bohemian Rhapsody (2018) (bass guitar coach) for composers Queen

=== Television ===
- Children’s Hospital theme, ‘Ray of Sunshine’ (1993-2003) for Debbie Wiseman
- A Touch of Frost (1992-2010) for composer Barbara Thompson
- Soldier Soldier (1991–99) for composer Jim Parker
- Shrinks (1991) for composer Debbie Wiseman
- A Royal Gala in aid of The Princes Trust (feat. Robin Williams) (1987) for musical director Alyn Ainsworth
- The Worst Witch (film) (1986) for composer Denis King
- Hotel du Lac (film) (1986) for composer Carl Davis
- Strike It Lucky theme 'Born To Run'(1996–99) for composer Paul Westwood
- Stage Fright, Only Fools and Horses (1991). Personal appearance. for composers Ronny Hazelhurst and John Sullivan
- Only Fools and Horses (1981-2003) for composers Ronny Hazelhurst and John Sullivan
- Bergerac (1981–91) for composer George Fenton
- The Racing Game (1979) for composer Mike Moran
- for Alyn Ainsworth (ITV musical director)
  - Live from the Palladium
  - Live from Her Majesty’s Theatre
  - BAFTA Award Show
  - Royal Variety Show
  - Jimmy Tarbuck Show
  - Surprise Surprise (Cilla Black)
- for John Coleman
  - Eurovision Song Contest
  - Les Dawson Show
  - The Best of Les Dawson
  - The Best of Tommy Cooper
  - Opportunity Knocks (Bob Monkhouse)
  - Lena Zavaroni Show
