= Fred Mandel =

Canadian session keyboardist and guitarist

- Born: Frederick Lawrence Mandel; Estevan, Saskatchewan, Canada
- Origin: Toronto, Ontario, Canada
- Genres: Rock
- Occupations: Session musician
- Instruments: Keyboards; guitar
- Formerly of: Queen; Supertramp; Elton John Band; Alice Cooper band
- Website: fredmandelmusic.com

Frederick Lawrence Mandel is a Canadian session musician, keyboard player and guitarist.

== Career ==
Born in Estevan, Saskatchewan, Mandel started playing the piano at four and picked up the guitar aged eight. Growing up in an Orthodox Jewish household, he found his parents less than encouraging of his musical endeavors. Nevertheless, in 1964, at the age of 11, with his family having moved to Toronto, he became immersed in the local music scene.

Mandel made his first appearance on record courtesy of Domenic Troiano (whose band he was in at the time). Troiano was invited to record on Alice Cooper's first solo record and got Mandel to play keyboards on the record. This led to Alice Cooper inviting Mandel to join his live band. Mandel did this for four years (1977–1980) progressing from keyboards to lead guitar and finally ending up working as the musical director.

During his work with Alice Cooper, Mandel played keyboards on the Pink Floyd album The Wall and this was followed up by some recordings with Cheap Trick.

In the 1980s, Mandel performed with Queen on their 1982 tour supporting their album Hot Space (the Hot Space Tour). He struck up a good working relationship with the band and was later invited to be a contributing musician on their 1984 album The Works. Mandel performed on "Man on the Prowl" and three of the album's singles, "Radio Ga Ga", "Hammer to Fall", and "I Want to Break Free" (the synthesizer solo on the lattermost is played by Mandel on a Roland Jupiter-8). Mandel also played on two Queen spinoffs: Brian May's 1983 mini album Star Fleet Project and Freddie Mercury's 1985 album Mr. Bad Guy.

Following this, Mandel went on tour with Supertramp who were performing their last gigs with their classic line up on a tour named Famous Last Words.

Later on, Mandel recorded with his teen idol Elton John, whom Mandel states as being "...to this day, one of the most bad-ass rock and roll piano players around!"

In 2013, Mandel worked with thrash band Anthrax on the track "Smokin'", originally by Boston, ultimately released on Anthrax's album Anthems, an EP principally featuring covers from some of the band's favorite acts of the 1970s, along with two versions of "Crawl", a song from their previous studio album.

In 2024, Mandel released his first solo album, Part-Time Rebel.

== Selected discography ==
Musician:

- The Domenic Troiano Band: Burnin' at the Stake (1977)
- Alice Cooper: The Alice Cooper Show (1977, live album)
- Alice Cooper: From the Inside (1978)
- Pink Floyd: The Wall (1979)
- Alice Cooper: Flush the Fashion (1980)
- Brian May + Friends: Star Fleet Project (1983)
- Queen: The Works (1984)
- Freddie Mercury: Mr. Bad Guy (1985)
- Elton John: Ice on Fire (1985)
- Elton John: Leather Jackets (1986)
- Elton John: Live in Australia with the Melbourne Symphony Orchestra (1987)
- Bernie Taupin: Tribe (1987)
- Elton John: Reg Strikes Back (1988)
- Elton John: Sleeping with the Past (1989)
- Supertramp: Some Things Never Change (1997)
- Queen: Queen on Fire – Live at the Bowl (2004; DVD bonus material)
- Philip Sayce: Peace Machine (2009)
- Anthrax: Anthems (2013)

Solo:

- Fred Mandel: Part-Time Rebel (2024)

Film:

- Roadie (1980)
