= The Rocket Record Company =

British record label

- Parent company: Universal Music Group
- Founded: 1973
- Defunct: 2007
- Distributors: US: MCA Records (1973–1978); RCA Records (1978–1982); Geffen Records (1982–1989); Island/Mercury (1989–present); UK: Island (1973–1978); Phonogram Inc. (1978–1995); Mercury Records (1995–1998); Island/Mercury (1998–2013); Virgin EMI (2013–2020); EMI (2020–present)
- Genre: Rock
- Country of origin: UK, US
- Official website: rocketmusic.com

The Rocket Record Company is a record label founded by Elton John, along with Bernie Taupin, Gus Dudgeon, Steve Brown and others, in 1973. The company was named after John's hit song "Rocket Man". The label was originally distributed in the UK by Island and in the US by MCA Records, both of which John was also signed to (after 1976).

== History ==
Original logo based on The Railway Series

The first artists who signed to the label were the group Stackridge, who completed two albums for The Rocket Record Company after moving from MCA. It also became the home of Cliff Richard, Neil Sedaka (whose three most successful U.S. mid-1970s albums were on Rocket), Colin Blunstone, the Hudson Brothers, Blue, Kiki Dee, Judie Tzuke, The Lambrettas, Junior Campbell, Brian & Brenda Russell, and the Dutch band Solution. John offered to sign Iggy Pop & The Stooges to the label, but they declined. After John left his British label, DJM, in 1976, his records were also released by The Rocket Record Company on both sides of the Atlantic. The label also attempted to attract talent from all over the UK and submitted an advertisement to Melody Maker for bands to record their sound of today and get it out tomorrow. With an album called "499 2139" (which incidentally was the studio's telephone number) they turned to the talents of Pete Waterman (of Stock Aitken Waterman fame). Waterman and his then assistant Tony Keys recorded and produced a unique mixture of music which, although it only grazed the bottom of the album charts, managed to capture a mixture of genres including a track from The Lambrettas called "Go Steady".

In the US and Canada, John's residency on his own label was short-lived. After only one album, Blue Moves, and a couple of singles (including the hits "Don't Go Breaking My Heart" and "Sorry Seems to Be the Hardest Word"), he returned to MCA. At this time, The Rocket Record Company switched distribution to RCA after being dropped from MCA. The label was discontinued in the US in the early 1980s, then relaunched in 1995 with John's Made in England album, distributed by Island Records. 1997's The Big Picture and "Candle in the Wind 1997" were distributed in the US by stepsister A&M Records.

In the UK, John's records were released by The Rocket Record Company from 1976 onward. In 1978 the distribution moved to Phonogram Inc., then to Mercury Records in 1995. By this time, John was the only artist on the label.

Worldwide distribution rights to Elton John's music were consolidated when MCA Records' then-parent Seagram acquired PolyGram, the owner of Island, Mercury, and A&M, in 1998. Universal Music Group, which oversaw Seagram's recording operations, now co-owns the Elton John catalogue with the singer himself, continuing to distribute it worldwide.

== Recent history ==
In 1999, The Rocket Record Company was absorbed by The Island Def Jam Music Group, and it operated under IDJ's Mercury Records division. However, the logo was still used on all new Elton John releases until 2007. The name was also resurrected in 2006 for the eponymous Platinum Weird album. In 2011, John formed a company named Rocket Music Entertainment Group.

The label still exists today, with just three artists signed to it, as John himself has not released a studio album on Rocket since 2004's Peachtree Road, although the 2010 one-off collaboration with Leon Russell, The Union has the Rocket logo from that time. Otherwise, Rocket is primarily a management company handling established artists such as Ed Sheeran and Squeeze's Chris Difford along with upcoming artists including Anne-Marie and Jake Issac.

== Notable artists ==
The following artists have used The Rocket Record Company:

- Elton John
- Longdancer (Dave Stewart)
- Davey Johnstone / China
- Nigel Olsson
- Kiki Dee
- Cliff Richard
- Neil Sedaka
- Stackridge
- Solution
- Junior Campbell
- Colin Blunstone
- Brian & Brenda Russell
- Blue
- Hudson Brothers
- Alan Hull / Radiator
- Judie Tzuke
- Lulu
- The Lambrettas
- Jo Lemaire & Flouze
- Johnny Warman
- Dramatis
- Fred Wedlock
- Randy Edelman
- Ryan Downe
- Platinum Weird
- The Moirs
- Mal Pope
- Ed Sheeran
- Jimmie's Chicken Shack
- Chris Difford
- Daniel Cartier
- Foster Brothers

== See also ==
- Lists of record labels
