= Davey Johnstone =

British guitarist

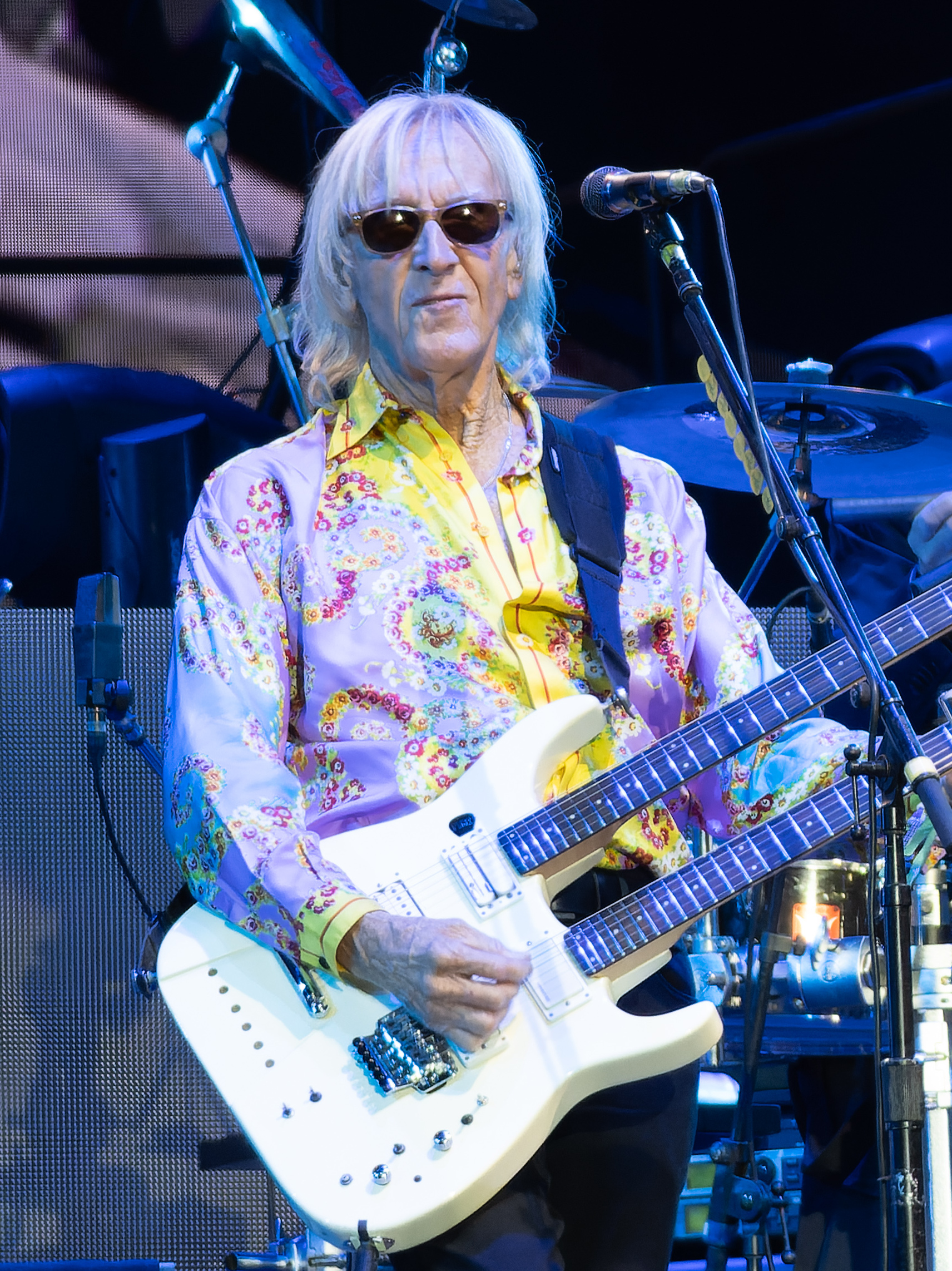
- Johnstone in concert with Elton John, 2023

Background information
- Born: David William Logan Johnstone; 6 May 1951 (age 75); Edinburgh, Scotland
- Genres: Rock; folk
- Occupations: Musician; songwriter
- Instruments: Guitar; vocals
- Years active: 1968–present
- Labels: Vertigo; Rocket; Artful Balance Records

David William Logan Johnstone (born 6 May 1951) is a Scottish rock guitarist and vocalist, best known for his long-time collaboration with Elton John as a member of the Elton John Band.

== Career ==
Johnstone was born in Edinburgh and took violin lessons at primary school from the age of seven. By the age of 10, he was playing it "sideways like a guitar". One of his sisters later bought him a guitar for Christmas, and by the age of 12 he was organising bands at his secondary school, Forrester High School. He had already decided that he wanted to become a musician.

Johnstone's first work was with Noel Murphy in 1968, where he received his first album credit on the album Another Round. By 1969, Johnstone had secured regular work as a session musician, where he began to branch out and explore differing genres of music, and experiment with a variety of instruments. In 1970, when Lyell Tranter (one of the two guitarists in the acoustic British folk group Magna Carta) left the band, Johnstone took his place as a member. He recorded several albums with them beginning in 1970 on Seasons (1970), and continued to contribute to Songs from Wasties Orchard (1971) (named after the street where he lived in Long Hanborough, Oxfordshire), and a live album entitled In Concert.

During his stint with Magna Carta, Johnstone played a wide variety of instruments including guitar, mandolin, sitar, and dulcimer. He also caught producer Gus Dudgeon's attention during this time – Dudgeon asking Johnstone to play on Bernie Taupin's eponymous 1971 solo album, which resulted in a meeting with Elton John, and ultimately, Johnstone's playing on John's 1971 album Madman Across the Water, after which he was invited to join Elton John's band as a full member. Previously, the Elton John Band consisted of John himself, bassist Dee Murray, and drummer Nigel Olsson.

Johnstone's debut album as a full-time member with John's band, was the 1972 Honky Chateau, on which he played electric and acoustic guitars, slide guitar, banjo, and mandolin, and also sang backing vocals alongside Murray and Olsson. In 1972 he worked with Joan Armatrading and Pam Nestor on their Gus Dudgeon-produced debut album Whatever's for Us, playing acoustic and electric guitar on several tracks, and sitar on the song "Visionary Mountains".

Johnstone released a solo album, Smiling Face, in 1973 through The Rocket Record Company and created a short-lived band called China that released an eponymous album in 1977.

Even while playing alongside other artists such as Stevie Nicks, Bob Seger, Meat Loaf and Alice Cooper during the late 1970s and early 1980s, Johnstone was never very far from Elton's projects, and following his reunion with original bandmates Nigel Olsson and Dee Murray full-time for 1982's "Jump Up" tour, has rarely been absent from an Elton John album track or tour.

In 2014, he played on "Belle Fleur" and "If You Were My Love" from Stevie Nicks' album 24 Karat Gold: Songs from the Vault. He knew Nicks from when he played guitar on several songs from her 1981 album Bella Donna.

On 1 October 2019, Johnstone performed his 3,000th show with Elton John at the first of two Farewell Yellow Brick Road tour stops at the SaskTel Centre in Saskatoon, Saskatchewan.

On 25 June 2023, Johnstone performed with Elton John at the Glastonbury Festival. The set was one of the headline acts and was billed as John's last live UK performance.

== Personal life ==
Johnstone lives in Los Angeles with his wife. The couple have seven children.

== Solo albums ==
- Smiling Face (1973)
- Deeper Than My Roots (2022)

== Collaborations ==
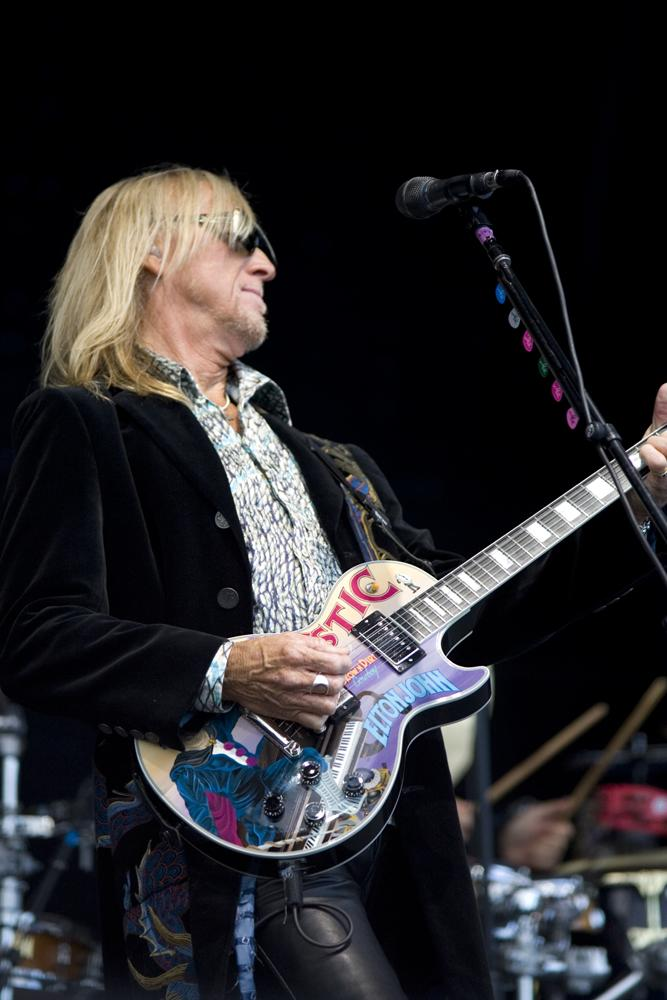
Johnstone performing in 2008

With Elton John

- Madman Across the Water (Uni Records, 1971)
- Honky Château (Uni Records, 1972)
- Don't Shoot Me I'm Only the Piano Player (MCA Records, 1973)
- Goodbye Yellow Brick Road (MCA Records, 1973)
- Caribou (MCA Records, 1974)
- Captain Fantastic and the Brown Dirt Cowboy (MCA Records, 1975)
- Rock of the Westies (MCA Records, 1975)
- Blue Moves (Rocket, 1976)
- Too Low for Zero (Geffen, 1983)
- Breaking Hearts (Geffen, 1984)
- Ice on Fire (Geffen, 1985)
- Leather Jackets (Geffen, 1986)
- Reg Strikes Back (MCA Records, 1988)
- Sleeping with the Past (MCA Records, 1989)
- The One (MCA Records, 1992)
- Made in England (Island Records, 1995)
- The Big Picture (Mercury Records, 1997)
- Songs from the West Coast (Mercury Records, 2001)
- Peachtree Road (Universal Music Records, 2004)
- The Captain & the Kid (Mercury Records, 2006)
- Wonderful Crazy Night (Mercury Records, 2016)

With Alice Cooper

- From the Inside (1978)
- Flush the Fashion (1980)

With Joan Armatrading

- Whatever's for Us (A&M Records, 1972)

With Eric Carmen

- Tonight You're Mine (Arista Records, 1980)

With Belinda Carlisle

- A Woman and a Man (Chrysalis Records, 1996)

With B.B. King

- B.B. King & Friends: 80 (Geffen, 2005)

With Shaun Cassidy

- Under Wraps (Warner Bros. Records, 1978)

With Ryan Malcolm

- Home (Sony, 2003)

With Jimmy Webb

- Land's End (Asylum Records, 1974)

With Rick Astley

- Portrait (RCA Records, 2005)

With Kiki Dee

- Loving & Free (Rocket, 1973)
- Kiki Dee (Rocket, 1977)
- Stay with Me (Rocket, 1979)

With Brian Cadd

- Yesterdaydreams (Capitol Records, 1978)

With Olivia Newton-John

- The Rumour (MCA Records, 1988)

With Bernie Taupin

- Taupin (DJM, 1971)

With Rod Stewart

- A Spanner in the Works (Warner Bros. Records, 1995)

With Yvonne Elliman

- Night Flight (RSO Records, 1978)
- Yvonne (RSO Records, 1979)

With Vonda Shepard

- Vonda Shepard (Reprise Records, 1989)

With Leo Sayer

- Leo Sayer (Chrysalis Records, 1978)

With Stevie Nicks

- Bella Donna (ATCO Records, 1981)
- 24 Karat Gold: Songs from the Vault (Reprise Records, 2014)

== See also ==
- Gibson Flying V
