= Gus Dudgeon =

English record producer (1942–2002)

Background information
- Born: Angus Boyd Dudgeon; 30 September 1942; Woking, Surrey, England
- Died: 21 July 2002 (aged 59) M4 motorway, Berkshire, England
- Genre: Pop
- Occupation: Record producer
- Years active: 1962–2002
- Labels: Decca; The Rocket Record Company

Angus Boyd "Gus" Dudgeon (30 September 1942 – 21 July 2002) was an English record producer, who oversaw many of Elton John's most acclaimed recordings, including his commercial breakthrough, "Your Song". Their collaboration led to seven US No. 1 albums, and established John as one of the most successful singles artists of the 1970s.

Dudgeon also produced Chris Rea's first hit, the US chart topping "Fool (If You Think It's Over)", and David Bowie's "Space Oddity", and steered many other artists to chart success, including Joan Armatrading and Elkie Brooks. The Guinness Book of Records cites Dudgeon as being the first person to use sampling in music production. He was a founding member of the Music Producers Guild.

== Early life and career ==
Angus Boyd Dudgeon was born on 30 September 1942 in Woking, Surrey, England. After being expelled from Haileybury School, he attended A. S. Neill's experimental and democratic Summerhill School. Throughout his life, Dudgeon regularly attended reunions and actively supported the school. Shortly before his death, he recounted how after leaving school, he was fired from a number of jobs in quick succession, "'cause I used to get bored and would leave without telling them. I worked in a toy store. I sold purple hearts on the streets of London—a pound for one hundred. I worked for a clip joint, an advertising agency. Just ridiculous jobs. I had no idea what I wanted to do".

After seeing a job vacancy in the newspaper, his mother steered Dudgeon towards Olympic Studios where he worked as a tea boy. Within a few years he had worked his way up to a position as an in-house engineer at Decca's studio in West Hampstead. In this capacity, he worked with the Artwoods, Bruce Channel, Davy Graham and Shirley Collins. Early pop successes included the Zombies' single "She's Not There" (1964) and John Mayall's album Blues Breakers with Eric Clapton (1966). He helped in the auditions for Tom Jones and the Rolling Stones. He rose to co-produce Ten Years After's debut album in 1967. Around this time, he also produced the Bonzo Dog Band albums, The Doughnut in Granny's Greenhouse and Tadpoles.

== Collaboration with Elton John ==
At the urging of producers Denny Cordell and Andrew Loog Oldham, Dudgeon moved into production, setting up Tuesday Productions in 1968. Two years later, he began working with Elton John, who had heard Dudgeon's work on the as-yet-unreleased "Space Oddity". Their first collaboration was "Your Song", with Dudgeon elaborating the simple piano tune and adding an orchestral arrangement by Paul Buckmaster. It reached the US Top 10, becoming John's first substantial hit, and kick-starting "one of the most successful artist-producer pairings of all time, with Dudgeon guiding John throughout the decade and launching such blockbuster albums as Madman Across the Water, Honky Château, Goodbye Yellow Brick Road, and Captain Fantastic and the Brown Dirt Cowboy.

Elton John trusted Dudgeon’s production instincts to the point that the artist often left the studio after the piano and vocal tracks were laid down, "leaving Dudgeon to create that unique synthesis of orchestral pop and Americana that defined many of John's best recordings". The producer helped to "make John the most successful singles artist of the 1970s, and No. 2 on the album charts behind Elvis Presley". Dudgeon and Elton John formed The Rocket Record Company and put out successful releases for Neil Sedaka and Kiki Dee. However, Dudgeon was sometimes critical of his and Elton John's work, and is quoted in Elizabeth Rosenthal's His Song: The Musical Journey of Elton John as castigating 1974's Caribou (which he produced), saying that "the sound is the worst, the songs are nowhere, the sleeve came out wrong, the lyrics weren't that good, the singing wasn't all there, the playing wasn't great and the production is just plain lousy". Dudgeon and Elton John parted company in 1976, re-uniting in 1985 to produce three more albums together.

== Bowie, Brooks and sampling ==
After leaving Decca, where he had been an engineer on David Bowie's debut, Dudgeon produced Bowie's "Space Oddity" (1969). Tony Visconti agreed to produce the album, but not the single which he regarded as a novelty tune, and suggested Dudgeon instead. He went on to produce Michael Chapman's first three albums, Rainmaker (1969), Fully Qualified Survivor (1970), and Wrecked Again (1971). Each of these albums features string arrangements by Buckmaster. His production of John Kongos' hit "He's Gonna Step on You Again" (1971) used a tape loop of African tribal drumming. The Guinness Book of Records recognised him as the first person to use sampling in music production. He was also credited by Bowie as the voice of the gnome on The Laughing Gnome.

In 1972, Dudgeon produced Joan Armatrading's debut, Whatever's for Us, written by Armatrading and her then collaborator Pam Nestor. He also produced two singles for the duo, "Lonely Lady" and "Together in Words And Music" (Cube Records, 7" single, BUG-31). Both tracks were later added to the re-mastered CD of the Whatever's For Us album (2001). He also produced two highly successful albums for Elkie Brooks: Pearls and Pearls II, the former peaking at No. 2 and remaining in the UK Albums Chart for 79 weeks. In 1980, Dudgeon started working with Mary Wilson of the Supremes on her second solo album. Four songs were recorded and produced, including a cover of Creedence Clearwater Revival's "Green River". Ultimately Motown Records dropped Wilson's contract, and the masters were returned to her, the first time the company had ever done so. They were released in 2021 on Mary Wilson (Expanded Edition).

== Other work ==
Dudgeon worked with a variety of acts, including Shooting Star, Audience, Chris Rea, Ralph McTell, Gilbert O'Sullivan, Lindisfarne, Judith Durham, Fairport Convention, the Sinceros, the Beach Boys, Solution, Voyager, Steeleye Span and Angie Gold.

In the late 1970s, he built Sol Studios, and also started working with alternative bands, including XTC, Menswear, and the Frank and Walters. In 1989, Dudgeon produced the debut solo album by Thomas Anders (ex-Modern Talking). At the time of his death, he was managing a band called Slinki Malinki.

== Personal style ==
In the 1960s, Dudgeon regularly shopped on Chelsea's King's Road, and had a reputation as a flamboyant, stylish and sophisticated dresser. Throughout his career, he worked mainly with solo artists and preferred to select artists, engineers and studios himself, allowing him to piece albums together. Considered to be a perfectionist, he was also calm and patient and liked to stop recording to socialize.

== Death ==
On 21 July 2002, Dudgeon and his wife, Sheila, died when their Jaguar veered off the M4 between Reading and Maidenhead. The inquest recorded a verdict of accidental death, noting that he was intoxicated and had possibly fallen asleep at the wheel while driving well in excess of the speed limit. He and his wife both suffered severe head injuries, were trapped in the car which landed in a storm drain, and may have drowned.

== Posthumous honours ==
In 2002, the Gus Dudgeon Foundation for Recording Arts was established "to preserve and promote music production techniques allowing students... to learn and pass on these skills for future generations". Jim Barrett, a lecturer at the University of Glamorgan, installed Dudgeon's MCI mixing console in the Atrium building, "a multi-million pound facility", where, at the 2009 Art of Record Production Conference, Joan Armatrading opened The Gus Dudgeon Suite.

Elton John, Chris Hook, and Phil Harding each paid tribute to Dudgeon at the opening ceremony. Every summer, the university hosts a graduate recording course in Dudgeon's honour, in collaboration with the audio education organisation JAMES.

Joan Armatrading dedicated her 2003 album, Lovers Speak, to Dudgeon and his wife Sheila. Elton John similarly dedicated his 2004 album, Peachtree Road.
