= Elton John singles discography =

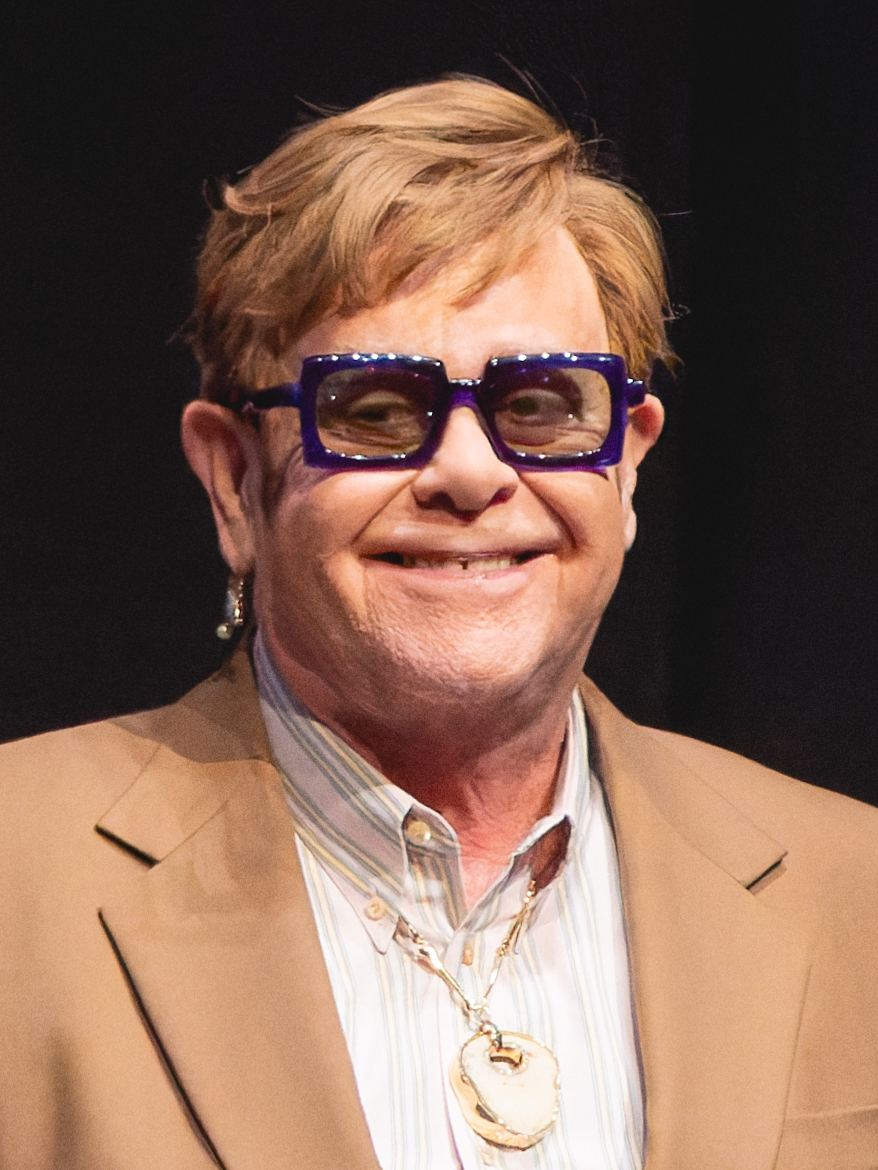
- John in 2024
- Singles as main artist: 148
- Singles as featured artist: 22
- Other appearances: 133
- Charity singles: 4
- Other charted songs: 3

The singles discography of British singer, songwriter and pianist Elton John consists of 148 official singles as main artist, 22 as a featured artist, as well as 133 other guest appearances, 4 charity singles, and 3 other charted songs.

In 1970, a year after starting his solo career, John released his first hit single, "Your Song", which became his first top ten in both the UK and the US. His critical success was at its peak in the 1970s, when he released a streak of chart-topping singles in the US and UK, including "Rocket Man" (1972), "Honky Cat" (1972), "Crocodile Rock" (1972), "Daniel" (1973), "Saturday Night's Alright for Fighting" (1973), "Goodbye Yellow Brick Road" (1973), "Step into Christmas" (1973), "Bennie and the Jets" (1974), "The Bitch Is Back" (1974), "Philadelphia Freedom" (1975), "Someone Saved My Life Tonight" (1975), and "Don't Go Breaking My Heart" (1976).

John continued his success in the 1980s and 1990s, having several hit singles including "I Guess That's Why They Call It the Blues" (1983), "I'm Still Standing" (1983), "Sad Songs (Say So Much)" (1984), "Nikita" (1985), "Sacrifice" (1989), "The One" (1992), and "Believe" (1995). In 1997, John released the double A-side single "Something About the Way You Look Tonight"/"Candle in the Wind 1997" in dedication to the memory of Princess Diana. The single subsequently hit number one in every country that it charted in and became the biggest-selling single of all time since the UK and US charts began in the 1950s, with worldwide sales of 33 million. John has continued to record new music since then, including the singles "I Want Love" (2001), "Electricity" (2005), "Looking Up" (2015), "(I'm Gonna) Love Me Again" (2019), "Cold Heart (Pnau remix)" (2021), and "Hold Me Closer" (2022).

Throughout his career, John has sold 100 million singles worldwide, making him one of the biggest selling music artists of all time. He has had 57 top 40 hits in the United States, with 27 of these hitting the top ten and 9 reaching number one. In his native United Kingdom, John has accumulated 70 top 40 singles, including 35 top tens and 10 number ones, making him joint ninth on the list of artists with most number-one singles on the UK singles chart (with Eminem). In 2021, John became the first solo artist with UK Top 10 singles across six decades.

== Singles ==
=== 1960s ===
Year	Title	Album
1968	"I've Been Loving You" b/w "Here's to the Next Time"	Non-album singles
1969	"Lady Samantha" b/w "All Across the Havens"	Non-album singles
1969	"It's Me That You Need" b/w "Just Like Strange Rain"	Non-album singles

=== 1970s ===
Year	Title	Peak chart positions										Certifications	Album
Year	Title	UK	AUS	BEL	CAN	GER	IRE	NLD	NZ	SWI	US	Certifications	Album
1970	"Border Song" b/w "Bad Side of the Moon"	—	—	—	34	—	—	25	—	—	92		Elton John
1970	"Rock n' Roll Madonna" b/w "Grey Seal"	—	—	—	—	—	—	—	—	—	—		Non-album single
1970	"From Denver to L.A." (Note: Credited to "Elton Johns" (sic), "From Denver to L.A." was issued as a promo, but after an injunction from John's record company, the single was withdrawn before any stock copies were pressed or released.) b/w "Warm Summer Rain" by The Barbara Moore Singers	—	—	—	—	—	—	—	—	—	—		The Games soundtrack
1970	"Country Comfort" b/w "Love Song"	—	—	—	—	—	—	—	15	—	—		Tumbleweed Connection
1970	"Your Song" b/w "Into the Old Man's Shoes" (UK) "Take Me to the Pilot" (US)	7	11	16	3	—	13	10	18	—	8	BPI: 4× Platinum; BVMI: Gold; RIAA: 3× Platinum; RIAJ: Gold; RMNZ: 5× Platinum	Elton John
1971	"Friends" b/w "Honey Roll"	—	96	—	13	—	—	—	19	—	34		Friends soundtrack
1971	"Levon" b/w "Goodbye"	—	94	—	6	—	—	—	—	—	24	RIAA: Platinum	Madman Across the Water
1972	"Tiny Dancer" b/w "Razor Face"	70 (Note: The single did not appear on the chart until September 2015.)	13 (Note: "Tiny Dancer" and "Rocket Man" was a double-A sided single in Australia)	—	19	—	—	—	—	—	41	BPI: 3× Platinum; ARIA: 7× Platinum; RIAA: 5× Platinum; RMNZ: 7× Platinum	Madman Across the Water
1972	"Rocket Man" b/w "Susie (Dramas)" "Holiday Inn" (UK) "Goodbye" (UK)	2	13	—	8	18	6	—	11	—	6	BPI: 4× Platinum; BVMI: Gold; RIAA: 5× Platinum; RMNZ: 9× Platinum	Honky Château
1972	"Honky Cat" b/w "Slave" "Lady Samantha" (UK) "It's Me That You Need" (UK)	31	78	—	10	41	—	—	4	—	8		Honky Château
1972	"Crocodile Rock" b/w "Elderberry Wine"	5	—	3	1	3	10	11	1	1	1	BPI: Platinum; RIAA: Platinum; RMNZ: 2× Platinum	Don't Shoot Me I'm Only the Piano Player
1973	"Daniel" b/w "Skyline Pigeon" (re-recording)	4	7	11	1	27	4	15	2	5	2	BPI: Silver; RIAA: Platinum; RMNZ: Platinum	Don't Shoot Me I'm Only the Piano Player
1973	"Saturday Night's Alright for Fighting" b/w "Jack Rabbit" "Whenever You're Ready (We'll Go Steady Again)"	7	31	—	12	44	13	—	20	—	12	BPI: Platinum; RIAA: Platinum; RMNZ: Platinum	Goodbye Yellow Brick Road
1973	"Goodbye Yellow Brick Road" b/w "Screw You (Young Man's Blues)"	6	4	—	1	49	4	23	1	—	2	BPI: Platinum; RIAA: 2× Platinum; RMNZ: 3× Platinum	Goodbye Yellow Brick Road
1973	"Step into Christmas" b/w "Ho Ho Ho (Who'd Be a Turkey at Christmas)"	7	31 (Note: "Step into Christmas" did not appear on the chart until 2019.)	—	—	52	20	54	25	29	—	BPI: 4× Platinum; ARIA: Platinum; RIAA: Platinum; RMNZ: Platinum	Non-album single
1974	"Bennie and the Jets" b/w "Harmony"	37	5 (Note: "Bennie and the Jets" and "Candle in the Wind" was a double-A sided single in Australia)	—	1	—	18	—	13	—	1	BPI: Platinum; RIAA: 4× Platinum; RMNZ: 4× Platinum	Goodbye Yellow Brick Road
1974	"Candle in the Wind" b/w "Bennie and the Jets"	11	5	—	—	—	8	—	5	—	—	BPI: Gold; RMNZ: Platinum	Goodbye Yellow Brick Road
1974	"Don't Let the Sun Go Down on Me" b/w "Sick City"	16	13	—	1	—	17	30	5	—	2	BPI: Silver; RIAA: Gold	Caribou
1974	"The Bitch Is Back" b/w "Cold Highway"	15	53	—	1	—	—	—	9	—	4	BPI: Silver; RIAA: Gold; RMNZ: Gold	Caribou
1974	"Lucy in the Sky with Diamonds" (with John Lennon) b/w "One Day at a Time"	10	3	—	1	31	—	—	2	—	1	RIAA: Gold	Non-album single
1975	"Philadelphia Freedom" b/w "I Saw Her Standing There" (with John Lennon)	12	4	—	1	50	—	—	2	—	1	RIAA: Platinum; RMNZ: Gold	Non-album single
1975	"Someone Saved My Life Tonight" b/w "House of Cards"	22	54	—	2	—	—	—	13	—	4	RIAA: Gold	Captain Fantastic and the Brown Dirt Cowboy
1975	"Island Girl" b/w "Sugar on the Floor"	14	12	—	4	42	—	—	4	—	1	MC: Gold; RIAA: Platinum	Rock of the Westies
1976	"Grow Some Funk of Your Own" "I Feel Like a Bullet (In the Gun of Robert Ford)"	56 (Note: Chart position is from the official UK "Breakers List".)	—	—	8	—	—	—	39	—	14		Rock of the Westies
1976	"Pinball Wizard" b/w "Harmony"	7	88	—	—	—	13	—	—	—	—		Tommy soundtrack
1976	"Love Song" (with Lesley Duncan) b/w "Love Song"	—	—	—	85	—	—	—	—	—	—		Here and There
1976	"Don't Go Breaking My Heart" (with Kiki Dee) b/w "Snow Queen"	1	1	3	1	5	1	3	1	4	1	BPI: 2× Platinum; ARIA: Gold; MC: Platinum; RIAA: 2× Platinum; RMNZ: 5× Platinum	Non-album single
1976	"Sorry Seems to Be the Hardest Word" b/w "Shoulder Holster"	11	19	—	3	—	3	14	7	—	6	BPI: Silver; MC: Gold; RIAA: Gold	Blue Moves
1977	"Crazy Water" b/w "Chameleon"	27	—	—	—	—	—	—	—	—	—		Blue Moves
1977	"Bite Your Lip (Get Up and Dance!)" b/w "Chicago" (UK) "Chameleon" (US)	28	72	—	51	—	—	—	—	—	28		Blue Moves
1977	"The Goaldiggers Song" b/w "Jimmy, Brian, Elton and Eric"	—	—	—	—	—	—	—	—	—	—		Non-album singles
1978	"Ego" b/w "Flinstone Boy"	34	40	—	21	—	—	—	—	—	34		Non-album singles
1978	"Part-Time Love" b/w "I Cry at Night"	15	12	—	13	—	11	—	14	—	22	BPI: Silver	A Single Man
1978	"Song for Guy" b/w "Lovesick"	4	14	9	—	22	7	11	7	—	110	BPI: Silver	A Single Man
1979	"Return to Paradise" b/w "Song for Guy"	—	—	—	—	—	—	49	—	—	—		A Single Man
1979	"Are You Ready for Love" b/w "Three Way Love Affair"	42	63	—	—	75	17	—	—	—	—	RMNZ: Gold	The Complete Thom Bell Sessions
1979	"Mama Can't Buy You Love" b/w "Strangers" (UK) "Three Way Love Affair" (US)	—	82	—	10	—	—	—	20	—	9	RIAA: Gold	The Complete Thom Bell Sessions
1979	"Victim of Love" b/w "Strangers"	—	38	—	46	—	—	—	—	—	31		Victim of Love
1979	"Johnny B. Goode" "Thunder in the Night" (UK) "Georgia" (US)	—	—	—	—	—	—	—	—	—	—		Victim of Love
"—" denotes items which were not released in that country or failed to chart.

=== 1980s ===
Year	Title	Peak chart positions										Certifications	Album
Year	Title	UK	AUS	BEL	CAN	GER	IRE	NLD	NZ	SWI	US	Certifications	Album
1980	"Little Jeannie" b/w "Conquer the Sun"	33	9	20	1	23	16	—	5	4	3	MC: Gold; RIAA: Gold	21 at 33
1980	"Sartorial Eloquence (Don't Ya Wanna Play This Game No More?)" b/w "Cartier" "White Man Danger"	44	91	—	57	—	—	—	—	—	39		21 at 33
1980	"Dear God" b/w "Tactics"	—	82	—	—	—	—	—	—	—	—		21 at 33
1981	"Les Aveux" b/w "Donner Pour Donner" (with France Gall)	—	—	37	—	—	—	46	—	—	—		Non-album singles
1981	"I Saw Her Standing There" (live) b/w "Whatever Gets You Thru the Night" (live) "Lucy in the Sky with Diamonds" (live) (with John Lennon)	40	81	—	—	—	13	—	—	—	—		Non-album singles
1981	"Nobody Wins" b/w "Fools in Fashion"	42	46	—	23	43	—	36	19	—	21		The Fox
1981	"Just Like Belgium" b/w "Can't Get Over Getting Over Losing You"	—	—	—	—	—	—	—	—	—	—		The Fox
1981	"Chloe" b/w "Tortured"	—	—	—	34	—	—	—	—	—	34		The Fox
1981	"Loving You Is Sweeter Than Ever" (with Kiki Dee)	—	—	—	—	—	—	—	—	—	—		Perfect Timing
1982	"Blue Eyes" b/w "Hey Papa Legba"	8	4	8	5	51	8	19	11	9	12		Jump Up!
1982	"Empty Garden (Hey Hey Johnny)" b/w "Take Me Down to the Ocean"	51	63	—	8	—	29	—	14	—	13	RMNZ: Gold	Jump Up!
1982	"Princess" b/w "The Retreat"	—	—	—	—	—	—	—	—	—	—		Jump Up!
1982	"Ball and Chain" b/w "Where Have All the Good Times Gone"	—	—	—	—	—	—	—	—	—	—		Jump Up!
1982	"All Quiet on the Western Front" b/w "Where Have All the Good Times Gone"	—	—	—	—	—	—	—	—	—	—		Jump Up!
1983	"I Guess That's Why They Call It the Blues" b/w "Choc Ice Goes Mental" (UK) "The Retreat" (US)	5	4	14	9	22	5	48	12	12	4	BPI: Platinum; RIAA: Platinum; RMNZ: 3× Platinum	Too Low for Zero
1983	"I'm Still Standing" b/w "Earn While You Learn" (UK) "Love So Cold" (US)	4	3	11	1	10	2	16	30	1	12	BPI: 4× Platinum; ARIA: 2× Platinum; BVMI: Platinum; RIAA: 2× Platinum; RMNZ: 4× Platinum	Too Low for Zero
1983	"Kiss the Bride" b/w "Dreamboat" (UK) "Choc Ice Goes Mental" (US)	20	25	—	37	58	17	—	32	—	25		Too Low for Zero
1983	"Cold as Christmas (In the Middle of the Year)" "Crystal"	33	12	—	—	—	16	—	—	—	—		Too Low for Zero
1984	"Too Low for Zero" b/w "Lonely Boy"	—	52	—	—	—	—	—	—	—	—		Too Low for Zero
1984	"Sad Songs (Say So Much)" b/w "A Simple Man"	7	4	26	4	18	2	—	8	3	5	RMNZ: Gold	Breaking Hearts
1984	"Passengers" b/w "Lonely Boy"	5	9	—	—	—	9	—	38	27	—	BPI: Silver	Breaking Hearts
1984	"Who Wears These Shoes?" b/w "Tortured" (UK) "Lonely Boy" (US)	50	76	—	36	—	11	—	39	—	16		Breaking Hearts
1984	"In Neon" b/w "Tactics"	—	—	—	92	—	—	—	12	—	38		Breaking Hearts
1985	"Breaking Hearts (Ain't What It Used to Be)" b/w "In Neon"	59	—	—	—	—	—	—	—	—	—		Breaking Hearts
1985	"Act of War" (with Millie Jackson) b/w "Act of War Part 2"	32	50	—	94	39	11	—	—	—	—		Non-album single
1985	"That's What Friends Are For" (with Dionne Warwick, Gladys Knight & Stevie Wonder) b/w "Two Ships Passing in the Night"	16	1	10	1	36	7	13	3	11	1	MC: Platinum; RIAA: Gold; RMNZ: Gold	Friends
1985	"Nikita" b/w "The Man Who Never Died" (UK) "Restless" (US)	3	3	1	2	1	1	1	1	1	7	BPI: Silver; BEA: Gold; IFPI AUT: Gold; IFPI SWI: Gold; NVPI: 2× Platinum; RMNZ: Platinum; SNEP: Silver	Ice on Fire
1985	"Wrap Her Up" (with George Michael) b/w "Restless" (UK) "The Man Who Never Died" (US)	12	22	—	26	54	12	—	33	—	20		Ice on Fire
1986	"Cry to Heaven" b/w "Candy by the Pound"	47	86	13	—	—	22	13	—	—	—		Ice on Fire
1986	"Heartache All Over the World" b/w "Highlander"	45	7	26	58	—	24	—	22	—	55		Leather Jackets
1986	"Slow Rivers" (with Cliff Richard) b/w "Billy and the Kids" & "Lord of the Flies"	44	82	24	—	—	25	—	—	—	—		Leather Jackets
1987	"Flames of Paradise" (with Jennifer Rush)	59	31	—	17	8	—	—	—	—	36		Heart over Mind
1987	"Your Song" (live) b/w "Don't Let the Sun Go Down on Me" (live) (with the Melbourne Symphony Orchestra)	—	100	—	—	—	—	—	—	—	—		Live in Australia
1987	"Candle in the Wind" (live) b/w "Sorry Seems to Be the Hardest Word" (live) (with the Melbourne Symphony Orchestra)	5	92	—	5	55	4	—	—	—	6		Live in Australia
1988	"Take Me to the Pilot" (live) b/w "Tonight" (live) (with the Melbourne Symphony Orchestra)	—	—	—	—	—	—	—	—	—	—		Live in Australia
1988	"I Don't Wanna Go on with You Like That" b/w "Rope Around a Fool"	30	24	—	1	22	25	—	21	10	2		Reg Strikes Back
1988	"Town of Plenty" b/w "Whipping Boy"	74	—	—	—	—	—	—	—	—	—		Reg Strikes Back
1988	"A Word in Spanish" b/w "Heavy Traffic"	91	—	—	10	43	—	—	—	27	19		Reg Strikes Back
1988	"Mona Lisas and Mad Hatters (Part Two)" b/w "A Word in Spanish"	—	—	—	—	—	—	—	—	—	—		Reg Strikes Back
1989	"Through the Storm" (with Aretha Franklin)	41	63	—	16	56	—	—	—	—	16		Through the Storm
1989	"Healing Hands" b/w "Dancing in the End Zone"	45	14	2	8	39	—	60	—	13	13		Sleeping with the Past
1989	"Sacrifice" b/w "Love Is a Cannibal"	1	7	2	19	36	2	3	19	23	18	BPI: Platinum; ARIA: Gold; RIAA: Gold; RMNZ: Platinum	Sleeping with the Past
"—" denotes items which were not released in that country or failed to chart.

=== 1990s ===
Year	Title	Peak chart positions										Certifications	Album
Year	Title	UK	AUS	BEL	CAN	GER	IRE	NLD	NZ	SWI	US	Certifications	Album
1990	"Club at the End of the Street" b/w "Whispers" (UK) "Sacrifice" (US)	47	19	24	12	45	27	28	16	—	28		Sleeping with the Past
1990	"You Gotta Love Someone" b/w "Medicine Man"	33	32	29	1	43	16	26	27	—	43		The Very Best of Elton John
1990	"Easier to Walk Away" b/w "I Swear I Heard the Night Talking" "Made for Me"	63	57	—	59	51	—	71	—	—	—		The Very Best of Elton John
1990	"Blue Avenue" b/w "Stones Throw from Hurtin'"	—	—	—	—	—	—	50	—	—	—		Sleeping with the Past
1991	"Don't Let the Sun Go Down on Me" (live) (with George Michael) b/w "I Believe (When I Fall in Love It Will Be Forever)"	1 (Note: The single re-entered the chart in January 2017, peaking at number 91.)	3	1	1	4	2	1	4	1	1	BPI: Gold; ARIA: Gold; NVPI: Platinum; RIAA: Gold; RMNZ: 2× Platinum; SNEP: Silver	Duets
1992	"The One" b/w "Suit of Wolves" "Fat Boys and Ugly Girls"	10	15	5	1	20	8	14	27	5	9		The One
1992	"Runaway Train" (with Eric Clapton) b/w "Understanding Women"	31	53	17	—	41	—	28	—	15	—		The One
1992	"The Last Song" b/w "The Man Who Never Died" (remix) "Song for Guy" (remix)	21	32	35	7	72	28	38	27	—	23		The One
1993	"Simple Life" b/w "The Last Song" (UK) "The North" (US)	44	122	—	3	63	—	—	—	—	30		The One
1993	"True Love" (with Kiki Dee) b/w "The Show Must Go On" (UK) "Runaway Train" (US)	2	34	4	12	38	2	—	—	—	56	BPI: Silver	Duets
1994	"Don't Go Breaking My Heart" (with RuPaul) b/w "Donner Pour Donner"	7	45	33	—	62	15	34	39	28	92		Duets
1994	"Shakey Ground" (with Don Henley)	—	—	—	64	—	—	—	—	—	—		Duets
1994	"Ain't Nothing Like the Real Thing" (with Marcella Detroit) b/w "Break the Chain"	24	—	—	—	—	—	—	—	—	—		Duets
1994	"Can You Feel the Love Tonight" b/w "Hakuna Matata"	14	9	26	1	14	9	14	7	10	4	BPI: Platinum; ARIA: Gold; GLF: Gold; IFPI AUT: Gold; RIAA: Platinum; RMNZ: Platinum; SNEP: Gold	The Lion King: Original Motion Picture Soundtrack
1994	"Circle of Life" b/w "Circle of Life" (Carmen Twillie version)	11	60	5	3	10	9	7	13	2	18	BPI: Gold; BVMI: Gold; RIAA: Gold; RMNZ: Gold	The Lion King: Original Motion Picture Soundtrack
1995	"Believe" b/w "The One"	15	23	38	1	56	24	47	43	20	13		Made in England
1995	"Made in England" b/w "Lucy in the Sky with Diamonds" (with John Lennon)	18	48	—	5	59	—	—	—	40	52	GLF: Gold	Made in England
1995	"Blessed" b/w "Latitude"	—	86	21	3	83	—	—	—	—	34		Made in England
1996	"Please" b/w "Made in England"	33	—	—	27	—	—	—	—	—	—		Made in England
1996	"You Can Make History (Young Again)" b/w "Song for Guy"	—	—	—	19	—	—	—	—	—	70		Love Songs
1996	"Live Like Horses" (with Luciano Pavarotti) b/w "Live Like Horses" (live)	9	—	65	—	—	—	74	—	—	—		The Big Picture
1997	"Something About the Way You Look Tonight" b/w "I Know Why I'm in Love" "No Valentines"	—	32	—	14	73	—	94	—	—	—	RMNZ: Gold	The Big Picture
1997	"Something About the Way You Look Tonight" "Candle in the Wind 1997" b/w "You Can Make History (Young Again)"	1	1	1	1	1	1	1	1	1	1	BPI: 9× Platinum; ARIA: 14× Platinum; BEA: 9× Platinum; BVMI: 9× Platinum; IFPI NOR: 8× Platinum; IFPI SWI: 9× Platinum; MC: 19× Platinum; NVPI: 6× Platinum; RIAA: 11× Platinum; RMNZ: 15× Platinum	The Big Picture; Non-album single
1998	"Recover Your Soul" b/w "I Know Why I'm in Love" "Big Man in a Little Suit"	16	92	55	39	73	—	—	—	—	55		The Big Picture
1998	"If the River Can Bend" b/w "Don't Let the Sun Go Down on Me" (live in Paris) "I Guess That's Why They Call it the Blues" (live in Paris) "Sorry Seems to be the Hardest Word" (live in Paris)	32	—	—	—	95	—	—	—	—	—		The Big Picture
1999	"Written in the Stars" (with LeAnn Rimes) b/w "Various Snippets"	10	85	55	35	79	—	95	—	34	29	RIAA: Gold	Elton John and Tim Rice's Aida
1999	"A Step Too Far" (with Heather Headley and Sherie Rene Scott) b/w "Your Song" (live at the Ritz)	—	—	—	—	—	—	—	—	—	—		Elton John and Tim Rice's Aida
"—" denotes items which were not released in that country or failed to chart.

=== 2000s ===
Year	Title	Peak chart positions										Certifications	Album
Year	Title	UK	AUS	BEL	CAN	GER	IRE	NLD	NZ	SWI	US	Certifications	Album
2000	"Someday Out of the Blue" b/w "Cheldorado" (with Heitor Pereira)	—	—	—	—	69	—	—	—	40	49		The Road to El Dorado soundtrack
2000	"Friends Never Say Goodbye" (with Backstreet Boys)	—	—	—	—	—	—	—	50	—	—		The Road to El Dorado soundtrack
2001	"Perfect Day" (with Collective Soul)	—	—	—	—	—	—	—	29	—	—		Blender
2001	"I Want Love" b/w "The North Star" "God Never Came There"	9	63	65	7	—	—	31	49	31	—	BPI: Silver	Songs from the West Coast
2002	"This Train Don't Stop There Anymore" b/w "Did Anybody Sleep With Joan of Arc"	24	—	—	—	—	—	83	—	—	—		Songs from the West Coast
2002	"Original Sin" b/w "I'm Still Standing" (live)	39	54	—	—	—	—	—	—	—	—		Songs from the West Coast
2002	"Your Song" (with Alessandro Safina for Sport Relief) b/w "Your Song" (instrumental)	4	—	—	8	—	29	88	—	—	—	BPI: Silver	Non-album single
2002	"Sorry Seems to Be the Hardest Word" (with Blue) b/w "Lonely This Christmas"	1	43	3	7	3	3	1	5	3	—	BPI: Gold; BEA: Gold; IFPI SWI: Gold; NVPI: Gold; RMNZ: Gold; SNEP: Gold	One Love
2003	"Are You Ready for Love" (remix) (with Ashley Beedle) b/w "Three Way Love Affair"	1	—	54	31	75	4	—	—	78	—	BPI: Platinum	The Thom Bell Sessions
2003	"The Heart of Every Girl"	—	—	—	—	—	—	—	—	—	—		Mona Lisa Smile: Music from the Motion Picture
2004	"Answer in the Sky"	—	—	—	—	—	—	—	—	—	—		Peachtree Road
2004	"All That I'm Allowed (I'm Thankful)" b/w "Answer in the Sky" "They Call Her the Cat"	20	—	—	—	—	—	—	—	—	—		Peachtree Road
2005	"Turn the Lights Out When You Leave" b/w "How's Tomorrow" "Peter's Song"	32	—	—	—	—	—	—	—	—	—		Peachtree Road
2005	"Ghetto Gospel" (Tupac Shakur featuring Elton John)	1	—	—	1	3	—	3	—	7	—	RMNZ: 2× Platinum	Loyal to the Game
2005	"Electricity" b/w "Indian Sunset"	4	—	—	—	—	31	—	—	—	—		Peachtree Road
2005	"Dreamland" (with Bruce Hornsby and the Noise Makers)	—	—	—	—	—	—	—	—	—	—		Intersections (1985–2005)
2005	"Where We Both Say Goodbye" (with Catherine Britt)	—	—	—	—	—	—	—	—	—	—		Non-album single
2006	"The Bridge"	—	—	—	—	—	—	—	—	—	—		The Captain & the Kid
2006	"Calling It Christmas" (with Joss Stone)	—	—	—	—	—	—	—	—	—	—		Elton John's Christmas Party
2008	"Joseph, Better You than Me" (with the Killers and Neil Tennant)	88	—	—	43	—	—	—	—	—	—		(Red) Christmas
2009	"Tiny Dancer (Hold Me Closer)" (with Ironik and Chipmunk)	3	41	—	—	—	17	—	—	—	—	BPI: Silver	No Point in Wasting Tears
"—" denotes items which were not released in that country or failed to chart.

=== 2010s ===
Year	Title	Peak chart positions								Certifications	Album
Year	Title	UK	AUS	BEL	CAN	IRE	JPN	US AC	US Dance	Certifications	Album
2010	"If It Wasn't for Bad" (with Leon Russell)	—	—	—	—	—	—	—	—		The Union
2010	"Poker Face/Speechless/Your Song" (with Lady Gaga)	—	—	—	94	—	—	—	—		Non-album singles
2011	"Hard Times" (with Plan B and Paloma Faith)	—	—	—	—	—	—	—	—		Non-album singles
2012	"Good Morning to the Night" (vs Pnau)	—	71	—	—	—	—	—	30		Good Morning to the Night
2012	"Sad" (vs Pnau)	48	—	84	—	—	—	—	—		Good Morning to the Night
2013	"Save Rock and Roll" (with Fall Out Boy)	—	—	—	—	—	8	—	—	RIAA: Gold	Save Rock and Roll
2013	"Oh Well" (with 2Cellos)	—	—	—	—	—	—	—	—		In2ition
2013	"Face to Face" (with Gary Barlow)	69	—	14	—	75	—	—	—		Since I Saw You Last
2013	"Home Again"	—	—	77	—	—	—	14	—		The Diving Board
2013	"Mexican Vacation (Kids in the Candlelight)"	—	—	—	—	—	—	—	—		The Diving Board
2013	"A Town Called Jubilee"	—	—	—	—	—	—	—	—		The Diving Board
2014	"Can't Stay Alone Tonight"	—	—	—	—	—	—	18	—		The Diving Board
2014	"I Wish We Were Leaving" (with Bright Light Bright Light)	—	—	—	—	—	—	—	—		Life Is Easy
2014	"Sorry Seems to Be the Hardest Word" (with Ray Charles)	—	—	—	—	—	—	—	—		Genius Loves Company
2014	"The Tracks of My Tears" (with Smokey Robinson)	—	—	—	—	—	—	—	—		Smokey & Friends
2015	"Looking Up"	—	—	—	—	—	—	12	—		Wonderful Crazy Night
2015	"Wonderful Crazy Night"	—	—	—	—	—	—	—	—		Wonderful Crazy Night
2016	"Blue Wonderful"	—	—	—	—	—	—	—	—		Wonderful Crazy Night
2016	"In the Name of You"	—	—	—	—	—	—	—	—		Wonderful Crazy Night
2016	"A Good Heart"	—	—	—	—	—	—	17	—		Wonderful Crazy Night
2016	"All in the Name" (with Bright Light Bright Light)	—	—	—	—	—	—	—	25		Choreography
2016	"Symmetry of Two Hearts" (with Bright Light Bright Light)	—	—	—	—	—	—	—	34		Choreography
2017	"Running Back to You" (with Bright Light Bright Light)	—	—	—	—	—	—	—	32		Choreography
2018	"High" (with Young Thug)	—	—	95	—	—	—	—	—		On the Rvn
2019	"(I'm Gonna) Love Me Again" (with Taron Egerton)	—	—	82	—	—	—	12	3		Rocketman: Music from the Motion Picture
"—" denotes items which were not released in that country or failed to chart.

=== 2020s ===
Year	Title	Peak chart positions										Certifications	Album
Year	Title	UK	AUS	AUT	FRA	GER	IRE	NLD	NZ	US	US Dance	Certifications	Album
2020	"Ordinary Man" (with Ozzy Osbourne)	—	—	—	—	—	—	—	—	—	—		Ordinary Man
2020	"Learn to Fly" (with Surfaces)	—	—	—	—	—	—	—	14	—	—		The Lockdown Sessions (Note: "Merry Christmas" appears on the Christmas edition of The Lockdown Sessions and also appears on the Christmas edition of Ed Sheeran's fifth studio album, =.) (Note: "Hold Me Closer" appears on the 2022 reissue of The Lockdown Sessions.)
2021	"Chosen Family" (with Rina Sawayama)	—	—	—	—	—	—	—	—	—	—		The Lockdown Sessions
2021	"It's a Sin" (with Years & Years)	47	—	—	—	—	90	—	—	—	—		The Lockdown Sessions
2021	"Cold Heart (Pnau remix)" (with Dua Lipa)	1	1	3	9	3	2	2	1	7	1	BPI: 5× Platinum; ARIA: 15× Platinum; BVMI: 3× Gold; IFPI AUT: 4× Platinum; RIAA: 4× Platinum; RMNZ: 10× Platinum; SNEP: Diamond	The Lockdown Sessions
2021	"After All" (with Charlie Puth)	—	—	—	—	—	—	—	19	—	—		The Lockdown Sessions
2021	"Finish Line" (with Stevie Wonder)	—	—	—	—	—	—	—	22	—	—		The Lockdown Sessions
2021	"Merry Christmas" (with Ed Sheeran)	1	16	4	20	4	1	37	2	37	—	BPI: Platinum; BVMI: Gold; IFPI AUT: 2× Platinum; RIAA: Gold; RMNZ: Platinum	The Lockdown Sessions
2022	"Hold Me Closer" (with Britney Spears)	3	1	23	65	31	2	33	1	6	1	BPI: Platinum; ARIA: Gold; BVMI: Gold; IFPI AUT: Platinum; RIAA: Platinum; RMNZ: 2× Platinum; SNEP: Platinum	The Lockdown Sessions
2024	"Never Too Late" (with Brandi Carlile)	—	—	—	—	—	—	—	—	—	—		Who Believes in Angels?
2025	"Who Believes in Angels?" (with Brandi Carlile)	—	—	—	—	—	—	—	—	—	—		Who Believes in Angels?
2025	"Swing for the Fences" (with Brandi Carlile)	—	—	—	—	—	—	—	—	—	—		Who Believes in Angels?
2025	"Stonehenge" (with Spinal Tap)	—	—	—	—	—	—	—	—	—	—		The End Continues
2025	"Talk to You" (with Sam Fender)	20	—	—	—	—	31	—	—	—	—		People Watching
"—" denotes items which were not released in that country or failed to chart.

=== Charity singles ===
Year	Title	Peak chart positions											Certifications	Album
Year	Title	UK	AUT	BEL	GER	IRE	NLD	NOR	NZ	SCO	SWE	SWI	Certifications	Album
1997	"Perfect Day" (with various artists for Children in Need)	1	24	7	54	1	6	1	25	1	31	37	BPI: 2× Platinum; BEA: Gold; IFPI NOR: Platinum	Non-album singles
2005	"Ever Fallen in Love (With Someone You Shouldn't've)" (with various artists) b/w original version by Buzzcocks	28	—	—	—	—	—	—	—	—	—	—		Non-album singles
2016	"I Love You All the Time"	—	—	—	—	—	—	—	—	—	—	—		Non-album singles
2021	"Sausage Rolls for Everyone" (LadBaby featuring Ed Sheeran and Elton John)	1	—	—	—	41	—	—	—	—	—	—		Non-album singles

== Other charted songs ==
Year	Title	Peak chart positions										Album
Year	Title	UK	AUS	FRA	GRC	NZ Hot	PRT	SCO	US	US Dance	VEN	Album
2020	"Sine from Above" (with Lady Gaga)	— (Note: "Sine from Above" did not enter the main chart in the United Kingdom but entered the download component chart at number 59.)	93	200	94	—	106	82	116	14	80	Chromatica
2021	"One of Me" (Lil Nas X featuring Elton John)	—	—	187	—	—	—	—	88	—	—	The Lockdown Sessions (Note: "One of Me" also appears on Lil Nas X's debut studio album, Montero.)
2021	"Always Love You" (featuring Young Thug and Nicki Minaj)	—	—	—	—	11	—	—	—	—	—	The Lockdown Sessions
"—" denotes items which were not released in that country or failed to chart.

== Other appearances ==
Year	Title	Album
1971	"Let's Burn Down the Cornfield", "Mr. Rubin", "Rock Me When He's Gone", "Flying" (John Baldry with Elton John on piano)	It Ain't Easy
1971	[unspecified tracks] (Lesley Duncan with Elton John on piano)	Sing Children Sing
1972	"Come Back Again", "Wild Mountain Thyme", "Iko Iko", "Jubilee Cloud" (John Baldry with Elton John on backing vocals)	Everything Stops for Tea
1973	"Keep Right On" (Davey Johnstone with Elton John on harmonium)	Smiling Face
1973	"Redneck Friend" (Jackson Browne with Elton John on piano) Elton John is credited as "Rockaday Johnny".	For Everyman
1973	"If It Rains", "Lonnie & Josie", "You Put Something Better Inside Me", "Supercool", "Song for Adam", "Sugar on the Floor" (Kiki Dee with Elton John on keyboards)	Loving & Free (Note: "Last Good Man in My Life" was also released as B-side of the 1973 single Lonnie & Josie.)
1973	"Rest My Head" (Kiki Dee with Elton John on electric piano, organ and backing vocals)	Loving & Free
1973	"Last Good Man in My Life" (Kiki Dee with Elton John on piano) Bonus track on 2008 reissue CD	Loving & Free
1974	"Let Me Be Your Car" (with Rod Stewart)	Smiler
1974	"Whatever Gets You thru the Night" (John Lennon with Elton John on harmony vocals, piano and organ)	Walls and Bridges
1974	"Surprise, Surprise (Sweet Bird of Paradox)" (John Lennon with Elton John on harmony vocals)	Walls and Bridges
1974	"Snookeroo" (Ringo Starr with Elton John on piano)	Goodnight Vienna
1974	"Only One Woman" (Nigel Olsson with Elton John on keyboards)	Nigel Olsson
1975	"Guru Banana", "Toujours La Voyage", "Circular Letter" (Kevin Ayers with Elton John on piano)	Sweet Deceiver
1975	"Bad Blood" (Neil Sedaka with Elton John on backing vocals)	Overnight Success
1976	"Steppin' Out" (Neil Sedaka with Elton John on backing vocals)	Steppin' Out
1976	"Tell Me When the Whistle Blows" (Brian and Brenda Russell with Elton John on piano and backing vocals)	Word Called Love
1976	"Highly Prized Possession" (Brian and Brenda Russell with Elton John on backing vocals)	Word Called Love
1977	[unspecified tracks] (Blue with Elton John as guest artist) Elton John is credited as "Redget Buntavan".	Another Night Time Flight
1977	[unspecified tracks] (China with Elton John on backing vocals)	China
1978	"Puttin' On the Style", "Diggin' My Potatoes" (Lonnie Donegan with Elton John on piano)	Puttin' On the Style
1978	"I'm Just a Rolling Stone" (Lonnie Donegan with Elton John on piano) Bonus track on 2007 reissue CD	Puttin' On the Style
1979	"Victim" (Blue with Elton John on keyboards)	Fools' Party
1979	"Love Sings" (Blue with Elton John on piano and backing vocals)	Fools' Party
1980	"Love (The Barren Desert)" (Bernie Taupin with Elton John on backing vocals)	He Who Rides the Tiger
1980	"Showdown" (Nigel Olsson with Elton John on piano)	Changing Tides
1986	"The Edge of Heaven" (Wham! with Elton John on piano)	The Final / Music from the Edge of Heaven
1986	"Party 'til You Puke", "Northern Lady" (Saxon with Elton John on piano)	Rock the Nations
1987	"I'm Still Standing"	The Prince's Trust 10th Anniversary Birthday Party
1987	"Saturday Night's Alright (For Fighting)", "Your Song"	The Prince's Trust Concert 1987
1987	"Citizen Jane", "Billy Fury" (Bernie Taupin with Elton John on backing vocals)	Tribe
1987	"Cloud 9" (George Harrison with Elton John on electric piano)	Cloud Nine
1987	"Devil's Radio", "Wreck of the Hesperus" (George Harrison with Elton John on piano)	Cloud Nine
1988	"The Rumour" (Olivia Newton-John with Elton John on piano and backing vocals)	The Rumour
1989	"Love Is a Cannibal"	Ghostbusters II soundtrack album (Note: "Love Is a Cannibal" also appears on the 1998 reissue of Sleeping with the Past.)
1989	"I'm Ready (Let's Have a Party)"	Rock, Rhythm and Blues
1990	"I Don't Wanna Go On with You Like That"	The Prince's Trust Rock Gala 1988 video
1990	"You Gotta Love Someone"	Days of Thunder: Music from the Motion Picture Soundtrack
1990	"Medicine Man"	Nobody's Child
1990	"Sad Songs (Say So Much)", "Saturday Night's Alright (For Fighting)"	Knebworth
1990	"Billy Get Your Guns" (Jon Bon Jovi with Elton John on piano)	Blaze of Glory
1990	"Dyin' Ain't Much of a Livin'" (Jon Bon Jovi with Elton John on piano and backing vocals)	Blaze of Glory
1990	"2 x 2" (Bob Dylan with Elton John on piano)	Under the Red Sky
1990	"The Measure of a Man"	Rocky V: Music from and Inspired by the Motion Picture
1991	"Wonderful You", "Behind the Smile" (Rick Astley with Elton John on piano)	Free
1991	"The Pacifier"	For Our Children
1991	"Come Down in Time" (Sting. Piano is credited to Nancy Treadlight, presumably an alias of Elton John)	Two Rooms: Celebrating the Songs of Elton John & Bernie Taupin
1992	"Some Other World"	FernGully: The Last Rainforest - Original Motion Picture Soundtrack
1992	"Up the Revolution"	The Bunbury Tails soundtrack album
1992	"Bohemian Rhapsody" (with Queen and Axl Rose)	The Freddie Mercury Tribute video
1992	"The Show Must Go On" (with Queen and Tony Iommi)	The Freddie Mercury Tribute video
1993	"Yeah" (Eddie Murphy with Elton John as guest vocals)	Love's Alright
1994	"Amen" (with Sounds of Blackness)	A Tribute to Curtis Mayfield
1994	"But Not for Me", "Chapel of Love"	Four Weddings and a Funeral: Original Motion Picture Soundtrack
1994	"Someone to Watch Over Me/Love Is Here to Stay"	The Glory of Gershwin
1994	"A Woman's Needs" (with Tammy Wynette)	Without Walls
1994	"Don't Let the Sun Go Down on Me"	The Unplugged Collection, Volume One
1995	"When the Money's Gone", "Emerald" (Bruce Roberts with Elton John on backing vocals)	Intimacy
1995	"Little Island"	Randy Newman's Faust
1995	"I'm Your Man"	Tower of Song: The Songs of Leonard Cohen
1995	"Red"	Sol En Si
1997	"Abide with Me"	Carnival! – The Rainforest Foundation
1997	"Candle in the Wind"	Diana Princess of Wales 1961-1997: The BBC Recording of the Funeral Service
1997	"Your Song", "Live Like Horses", "Don't Let the Sun Go Down on Me"	Music for Montserrat video
1997	"Hey Jude", "Kansas City" (Paul McCartney with Elton John and various artists)	Music for Montserrat video
1998	"Don't Stop"	Legacy: A Tribute to Fleetwood Mac's Rumours
1998	"Twentieth Century Blues"	Twentieth-Century Blues: The Songs of Noël Coward
1998	"Stand by Your Man"	Tammy Wynette Remembered
1998	"Wake Up Wendy"	Chef Aid: The South Park Album
1999	"Deep Inside" (Mary J. Blige with Elton John on piano) Contains replayed elements from "Bennie and the Jets".	Mary
1999	"The Bitch Is Back" (with Tina Turner)	VH1 Divas Live/99
1999	"Proud Mary" (with Tina Turner and Cher)	VH1 Divas Live/99
1999	"I'm Still Standing"	VH1 Divas Live/99
1999	"White Christmas" (with Rosie O’Donnell)	A Rosie Christmas
1999	"The Show Must Go On" (live at Théâtre National de Chaillot, 1997) (with Queen)	Greatest Hits III
2000	"If I Wasn't There", "How It Hurts" (Mal Pope with Elton John on backing vocals)	Golden Days (21st Century Remix) single CD (Note: "If I Wasn't There" and "How It Hurts" appear on Mal Pope's 2010 album Old Enough to Know Better.)
2000	"Border Song" (with Shawn Mullins) Bonus track included on some editions of the album	Beneath the Velvet Sun
2001	"Country Comfort" (with Earl Scruggs)	Earl Scruggs and Friends
2001	"Crocodile Rock" (with Bob the Builder)	Bob the Builder: The Album
2001	"Whole Lotta Shakin' Goin' On"	Good Rockin' Tonight: The Legacy of Sun Records
2001	"Honey Man" (with Cat Stevens)	Cat Stevens
2001	"Mona Lisas and Mad Hatters"	The Concert for New York City
2001	"Sofa Love"	Women Talking Dirty (Music from the Original Motion Picture)
2002	"Teardrops" (with Lulu)	Together
2003	"Your Song" (with Julian Lloyd Webber)	Made in England / Gentle Dreams
2004	"How Could We Still Be Dancin'?" (with Brian Wilson)	Gettin' In over My Head
2004	"Sorry Seems to Be the Hardest Word" (with Ray Charles)	Genius Loves Company
2004	"Bennie and the Jets", "Rocket Man"	Live Aid DVD
2004	"Don't Go Breaking My Heart" (with Kiki Dee)	Live Aid DVD
2004	"Don't Let the Sun Go Down on Me" (with George Michael)	Live Aid DVD
2004	"I'm Still Standing", "Can I Get a Witness" Additional tracks on 2018 digital release	Live Aid DVD
2004	"Makin' Whoopie"	Sweet Tracks 2004 (Note: "Makin' Whoopie" is also featured in the 2003 film Shoreditch.)
2005	"Children of the Revolution", "Tutti Frutti" (T. Rex with Elton John and Ringo Starr)	Born to Boogie (The Soundtrack Album)
2005	"Your Song" (with Patti LaBelle)	Classic Moments
2005	"Rock This House" (with B.B. King)	B. B. King & Friends: 80
2005	"Anyone Who Had a Heart" (with Luther Vandross)	So Amazing: An All-Star Tribute to Luther Vandross
2005	"Dream #29 (One True Love)" (Cindy Bullens with Elton John on piano)	Dream #29
2005	"Makin' Whoopee" (with Rod Stewart)	Thanks for the Memory: The Great American Songbook, Volume IV
2005	"The Bitch Is Back", "Saturday Night's Alright for Fighting"	Live 8 DVD
2005	"Children of the Revolution" (with Pete Doherty)	Live 8 DVD
2005	"Tears in Heaven" (with other artists)	Hurricane Relief: Come Together Now
2005	"I'm Still Standing" (live April 2001)	Hurricane Relief: Come Together Now
2005	"You May Be Right" (live at Giants Stadium, July 1994) (with Billy Joel)	My Lives
2005	"Stan" (live) (Eminem featuring Elton John)	Curtain Call: The Hits
2006	"In Private" (with Pet Shop Boys)	Fundamental Limited Edition
2006	"I Don't Feel Like Dancin'", "Intermission" (Scissor Sisters with Elton John on piano)	Ta-Dah
2006	"Rags to Riches" (with Tony Bennett)	Duets: An American Classic
2006	"I Guess That's Why They Call It the Blues" (with Mary J. Blige)	Mary J. Blige & Friends
2007	"2 Man Show" (with Timbaland)	Shock Value
2007	"Where to Now St. Peter?" (with Ann Wilson)	Hope & Glory
2007	"Blueberry Hill"	Goin' Home: A Tribute to Fats Domino
2007	"Your Song", "Saturday Night's Alright for Fighting", "Tiny Dancer", "Are You Ready for Love"	Concert for Diana DVD
2008	"Hier Encore", "Yesterday When I Was Young" (with Charles Aznavour)	Duos
2009	"The Drover's Ballad"	Australia (Music from the Movie)
2009	"Black Gives Way to Blue" (Alice in Chains with Elton John on piano)	Black Gives Way to Blue
2009	"Caroline" (Brandi Carlile featuring Elton John)	Give Up the Ghost
2010	"All of the Lights" (Kanye West featuring Rihanna with Elton John on piano and backing vocals)	My Beautiful Dark Twisted Fantasy
2011	"Mona Lisas and Mad Hatters/Rocket Man" (with Matthew Morrison)	Matthew Morrison
2011	"Monkey Suit" (with Leon Russell)	T-Bone Burnett Presents The Speaking Clock Revue: Live from the Beacon Theatre
2011	"A Dream Come True" (live October 2010) (with Leon Russell)	The Bridge School Concerts: 25th Anniversary Edition
2011	"Snowed In at Wheeler Street" (with Kate Bush)	50 Words for Snow
2013	"Help" (Hurts with Elton John on piano)	Exile
2013	"Don't Let the Sun Go Down on Me" (Straight No Chaser featuring Elton John)	Under the Influence
2013	"Fairweather Friends" (Queens of the Stone Age with Elton John on piano and backing vocals)	...Like Clockwork
2014	"Something About the Way You Look Tonight" (with Engelbert Humperdinck)	Engelbert Calling
2014	"Streets of Philadelphia"	A MusiCares Tribute to Bruce Springsteen DVD
2015	"Don't Go Breaking My Heart", "Afire Love" (with Ed Sheeran)	Jumpers for Goalposts: Live at Wembley Stadium DVD
2016	"Sick Love" (Red Hot Chili Peppers with Elton John on piano)	The Getaway
2016	"Where Do the Guilty Go?" (Frankie Miller featuring Elton John and Steve Cropper)	Frankie Miller's Double Take
2016	"Solid Wall of Sound" (A Tribe Called Quest featuring Busta Rhymes, Jack White and Elton John)	We Got It from Here... Thank You 4 Your Service
2017	"2 Fingers of Whiskey" (with Jack White)	Music from The American Epic Sessions: Original Motion Picture Soundtrack
2017	"Believe/Song for Guy" (with Pet Shop Boys)	Nightlife Further Listening 1996-2000 (Note: "Believe/Song for Guy" was also performed on the TV special An Audience with Elton John in 1997.)
2017	"Alone Again (Naturally)" (with Pet Shop Boys)	Release Further Listening 2001-2004 (Note: "Alone Again (Naturally)" was also released on a promo CD in 2005.)
2018	"Queen" (with Nile Rodgers & Chic and Emeli Sandé)	It's About Time
2018	"Bennie and the Jets"	Spotify Singles
2018	"Young Dumb & Broke" (with Khalid)	Spotify Singles
2019	"Never Too Late"	The Lion King
2020	"Personal Shopper" (Steven Wilson with Elton John as guest vocals)	The Future Bites
2020	"Bang a Gong (Get It On)" (with U2)	Angelheaded Hipster: The Songs of Marc Bolan & T. Rex
2020	"The Pink Phantom" (Gorillaz featuring Elton John & 6lack)	Song Machine, Season One: Strange Timez
2021	"Nothing Else Matters" (Miley Cyrus featuring WATT, Elton John, Yo-Yo Ma, Robert Trujillo & Chad Smith)	The Metallica Blacklist
2022	"100% Endurance (Elton John Version)" (Yard Act featuring Elton John)	Non-album single
2022	"Picture" (with Eddie Vedder)	Earthling
2022	"You're Still the One" (live from Miami, 1999) (with Shania Twain)	Come On Over Special Edition
2023	"Get Close", "Live by the Sword" (The Rolling Stones with Elton John on piano)	Hackney Diamonds
2023	"Don't Let the Sun Go Down on Me" (Dolly Parton featuring Elton John)	Rockstar
2023	"Guiding Light (Anniversary Edition)" (Foy Vance featuring Elton John, Keith Urban & Ed Sheeran)	Non-album single
2024	"I'm Not Gonna Miss You" (with Glen Campbell)	Glen Campbell Duets: Ghost on the Canvas Sessions (Note: A different version of "I'm Not Gonna Miss You" appears on The Lockdown Sessions.)
2024	"Saturday Night's Alright (For Fighting)" (with Orville Peck)	Stampede
2024	"Dice" (with Rachel Fuller)	Seeker
2024	"Cold Heart" (live October 2024) (with Dua Lipa)	Dua Lipa Live from the Royal Albert Hall

== See also ==
- Elton John albums discography
- Rock and Roll Hall of Fame
- Songwriters Hall of Fame
- List of artists who reached number one in the United States
- List of best-selling singles
- List of million-selling singles in the United Kingdom
- List of best-selling singles in the United States
