= Made in England =

Made in England may refer to:

- Products made in England; see Manufacturing in the United Kingdom
- Made in England (Elton John album), 1995
  - "Made in England" (song), by Elton John
- Made in England (Atomic Rooster album), 1972
- Made in England (The Adicts album), 2005
- Made in England / Gentle Dreams, a 2003 album by Julian Lloyd Webber

== See also ==
- Made in Britain
