= Mona Lisas and Mad Hatters =

Song by Elton John

from the album Honky Château
- Released: 19 May 1972
- Recorded: January 1972
- Studio: Château d'Hérouville, Hérouville, France; Trident, London, UK (mixing)
- Genre: Soft rock
- Length: 5:00
- Label: Uni (US): DJM (UK)
- Songwriters: Elton John; Bernie Taupin
- Producer: Gus Dudgeon

"Mona Lisas and Mad Hatters" is a song written by English musician Elton John and songwriter Bernie Taupin, and performed by John. It was released on the 1972 album Honky Château. The lyrics conveyed Taupin's take on New York City after hearing a gun go off near his hotel window during his first visit to the city. The song's lyrics were partly inspired by Ben E. King's "Spanish Harlem," written by Jerry Leiber and Phil Spector, in which he sings "There is a rose in Spanish Harlem."

The song was also released as the B-side of the "Harmony" UK single in 1980.

== Personnel ==
- Elton John – vocals, acoustic piano
- Davey Johnstone – electric, acoustic and slide guitars, mandolin
- Dee Murray – bass guitar

== Reception ==
AllMusic critic Stewart Mason retrospectively noted that the song is "less saccharine than many similar Elton John and Bernie Taupin ballads" and praised the "somewhat uncharacteristic emotional directness" of its lyrics.

Rolling Stone magazine's Jon Landau praised the song when it was released, writing:

"Mona Lisas and Mad Hatters" shows how much John can really do in the space of a single cut. Using minimal instrumentation and singing one of Taupin's most direct lyrics, John effortlessly reveals the myth beneath the myth of "... a rose in Spanish Harlem." He expresses his involvement with the city, his need for its people, and his final desire to be alone through one of his best tunes, simplest arrangements, and most natural vocal performances.

== Performances ==
Elton John himself called the song "one of my all-time favourites" when introducing it at his 60th-birthday concert in New York's Madison Square Garden, as he performed it more than a hundred times in concert.

John also performed the song at The Concert for New York City at Madison Square Garden on 20 October 2001. The concert was meant primarily as a tribute for family members and employees of New York's Fire, Police, and Emergency Medical Services departments who had been participating in the ongoing recovery efforts at the World Trade Center complex following the terrorist attacks of 11 September 2001.

== In popular culture ==
The song was used in the film Almost Famous, in a scene in New York City, highlighting the loneliness of Kate Hudson's character, who overdoses on Quaaludes and champagne.

== Sequel ==
A more upbeat sequel to the song called "Mona Lisas and Mad Hatters (Part Two)" was recorded 16 years later for John's album Reg Strikes Back.

== Certifications ==
Region	Certification	Certified units/sales
United States (RIAA)	Gold	500,000^{‡}
^{‡} Sales+streaming figures based on certification alone.
