= The Big Picture (Elton John album) =

Studio album by Elton John
- Released: 22 September 1997
- Recorded: November 1996 – May 1997
- Studios: The Townhouse and Air Lyndhurst (London, UK)
- Genre: Pop rock
- Length: 52:07
- Labels: Rocket; A&M; Mercury
- Producer: Chris Thomas

Elton John chronology
Love Songs (1996)	The Big Picture (1997)	Elton John and Tim Rice's Aida (1999)

Singles from The Big Picture
- 1. "Something About the Way You Look Tonight" / "Candle in the Wind 1997" Released: 13 September 1997; 2. "Recover Your Soul" Released: 2 February 1998; 3. "If the River Can Bend" Released: 1 June 1998

Professional ratings
Review scores
Source	Rating
AllMusic	3/5 stars
The Encyclopedia of Popular Music	3/5 stars
Entertainment Weekly	C
Los Angeles Times	2/4 stars
NME	5/10
Rolling Stone	Positive
Uncut	3/5 stars

The Big Picture is the twenty-fifth studio album by British musician Elton John. It was released on 22 September 1997 through The Rocket Record Company and Mercury Records. The album was recorded at Townhouse Studios in London and is John's last release to date to be produced by Chris Thomas.

Upon its release, The Big Picture was a commercial success, reaching the top five of the UK Albums Chart and the top 10 of the United States Billboard 200 and numerous other countries. Three songs—"Something About the Way You Look Tonight", "Recover Your Soul", and "If the River Can Bend"—were released as singles to promote the album, with the former being the most successful, particularly upon its re-release as a double A-side with "Candle in the Wind 1997", which became the best-selling single in Billboard history. The album would go on to be certified Platinum by the RIAA on August 19, 1998, for US sales in excess of 1,000,000 copies.

== Background ==
The album has a strong orchestral emphasis with string arrangements written by Anne Dudley and Elton John's then backup keyboardist Guy Babylon. In 2006, John revealed in an interview that Bernie Taupin, his longtime friend and lyricist, considers this his least favourite album they have created, while John believes that to be Leather Jackets from 1986. Taupin dislikes this album because of the overall quality of his lyrical contribution and because "the production is abysmally cold and technical".

The album was dedicated to John's friend, popular fashion designer Gianni Versace, who was murdered a few months before the album's release. This was John's last album to date to be produced by Chris Thomas, who had worked with John almost nonstop since 1981's The Fox. This is the only album in which neither Davey Johnstone nor bassist Bob Birch (during his tenure as the Elton John Band's bassist from 1992–2012) provide backing vocals. Drummer Charlie Morgan was let go from the band shortly after the album's release and soon replaced by Curt Bisquera and John's original drummer Nigel Olsson, who remains in the lineup to this day.

== Track listing ==
All lyrics are written by Bernie Taupin; all music is composed by Elton John.

The Big Picture track listing
No.	Title	Length
1.	"Long Way from Happiness"	4:47
2.	"Live Like Horses"	5:03
3.	"The End Will Come"	4:52
4.	"If the River Can Bend"	5:21
5.	"Love's Got a Lot to Answer For"	5:02
6.	"Something About the Way You Look Tonight"	5:11
7.	"The Big Picture"	3:44
8.	"Recover Your Soul"	5:18
9.	"January"	4:00
10.	"I Can't Steer My Heart Clear of You"	4:09
11.	"Wicked Dreams"	4:40
Total length:		52:07

Bonus track (Japanese pressings)
No.	Title	Length
12.	"I Know Why I'm in Love"	4:32
Total length:		56:39

== Outtakes ==
"Live Like Horses" was originally recorded in 1994 and intended for John's previous studio album, Made in England, but lack of time for the inclusion ruled this out. The single version of the song, released in 1996, was a duet with Luciano Pavarotti, but the song is performed solo for this album. The version with Pavarotti was later included on the bonus disc edition of John's compilation Greatest Hits 1970–2002.

"Past Imperfect" and an alternate version of "Recover Your Soul" were completed by John for inclusion on The Big Picture. Both songs have yet to see official release.

== Personnel ==
=== Musicians ===
- Elton John – vocals, acoustic piano, organ (1, 4, 5, 7, 8, 11)
- Guy Babylon – keyboards (1–9, 11), string arrangements
- Paul Carrack – organ (6)
- Matthew Vaughan – keyboards (10), percussion (10)
- Davey Johnstone – guitars
- John Jorgenson – guitars
- Bob Birch – bass
- Charlie Morgan – drums, percussion
- Paul Clarvis – tabla (8)
- Anne Dudley – string arrangements and conductor
- Carol Kenyon – backing vocals (1, 6, 8)
- Angel Voices Choir – choir (2)
- East London Gospel Choir – choir (4)
- Jackie Rawe – backing vocals (6, 8)

=== Production ===
- Chris Thomas – producer
- Pete Lewis – engineer
- Andy Green – assistant engineer
- Jay Reynolds – assistant engineer
- Ben Georgiades – assistant string engineer
- Adrian Collee – studio coordinator
- Pete Mills – studio coordinator
- Maureen Hillier – session coordinator
- Ranni Lewis – session coordinator
- Derek Mackillop – session coordinator
- Rick Lecoat – design
- Julian Schnabel – design, paintings, still life photography
- Mario Testino – portrait photography
- John Reid – management

== Charts ==
=== Weekly charts ===
Weekly chart performance for The Big Picture
Chart (1997–1998)	Peak position
Australian Albums (ARIA)	5
Austrian Albums (Ö3 Austria)	1
Belgian Albums (Ultratop Flanders)	10
Belgian Albums (Ultratop Wallonia)	3
Canadian Albums (Billboard)	14
Danish Albums (Hitlisten)	1
Dutch Albums (Album Top 100)	8
Estonian Albums (Eesti Top 10)	1
European Top 100 Albums (Music & Media)	1
Finnish Albums (Suomen virallinen lista)	4
French Albums (SNEP)	4
German Albums (Offizielle Top 100)	8
Hungarian Albums (MAHASZ)	13
Italian Albums (FIMI)	1
Japanese Albums (Oricon)	19
Malaysian Albums	10
New Zealand Albums (RMNZ)	7
Norwegian Albums (VG-lista)	2
Scottish Albums (Official Charts)	3
Spanish Albums (Promusicae)	5
Swedish Albums (Sverigetopplistan)	2
Swiss Albums (Schweizer Hitparade)	1
UK Albums (Official Charts)	4
US Billboard 200	9

=== Year-end charts ===
Year-end chart performance for The Big Picture
Chart (1997)	Position
Australian Albums (ARIA)	61
Austrian Albums (Ö3 Austria Top 40)	30
Danish Albums (Tracklisten)	12
Swiss Albums (Schweizer Hitparade)	45
UK Albums (OCC)	37

== Certifications ==
Region	Certification	Certified units/sales
Australia (ARIA)	Platinum	70,000^{^}
Austria (IFPI Austria)	Gold	25,000^{*}
Canada (Music Canada)	Platinum	100,000^{^}
Finland (Musiikkituottajat)	Gold	21,006
France (SNEP)	Gold	100,000^{*}
Hong Kong (IFPI Hong Kong)	Gold	10,000^{*}
New Zealand (RMNZ)	Gold	7,500^{^}
Norway (IFPI Norway)	Platinum	50,000^{*}
Spain (Promusicae)	Platinum	100,000^{^}
Sweden (GLF)	Gold	40,000^{^}
Switzerland (IFPI Switzerland)	Platinum	50,000^{^}
United Kingdom (BPI)	Platinum	300,000^{^}
United States (RIAA)	Platinum	1,000,000^{^}
Summaries
Europe (IFPI)	Platinum	1,000,000^{*}
^{*} Sales figures based on certification alone.^{^} Shipments figures based on certification alone.
