= Made in England (Elton John album) =

Studio album by Elton John
- Released: 20 March 1995
- Recorded: February–April 1994
- Studio: AIR Lyndhurst Hall (London, UK)
- Genre: Pop rock
- Length: 52:34
- Labels: Rocket (UK); Island (US)
- Producers: Greg Penny; Elton John

Elton John chronology
The Lion King (soundtrack) (1994)	Made in England (1995)	Love Songs (1996)

Singles from Made in England
- 1. "Believe" Released: 20 February 1995; 2. "Made in England" Released: 8 May 1995; 3. "Blessed" Released: 18 December 1995; 4. "Please" Released: 22 January 1996 (UK)

Professional ratings
Initial reviews (in 1995)
Review scores
Source	Rating
The Baltimore Sun	favourable
Chicago Tribune	2.5/4 stars
Deseret News	favourable
Entertainment Weekly	favourable
Los Angeles Times	3.5/4 stars
Music & Media	favourable
NME	4/10
Smash Hits	2/5 stars

Professional ratings
Retrospective reviews (after 1995)
Review scores
Source	Rating
AllMusic	3/5 stars
The Encyclopedia of Popular Music	4/5 stars
Rolling Stone	3.5/5 stars

Made in England is the twenty-fourth studio album by British musician Elton John, released in 1995. It was produced by Greg Penny and John, his first album since Leather Jackets without producer Chris Thomas. The album was dedicated to John's boyfriend and future husband David Furnish. It was also dedicated to the memory of Denis Gauthier and Peter Williams. It was the last album to feature regular Elton John Band percussionist Ray Cooper until 2016's Wonderful Crazy Night. With this album, Bob Birch became John's full-time recording and touring bass player until his death in 2012.

The song "Please" was covered by bluegrass singer Rhonda Vincent and country singer Dolly Parton for the 2018 tribute album Restoration: Reimagining the Songs of Elton John and Bernie Taupin.

== Background ==
While promoting his work for The Lion King soundtrack in September 1994, Elton John debuted "Believe" (five months before its release as a single) during the opening night of a concert tour with Ray Cooper in Phoenix, Arizona. "Believe" reached No. 15 on the UK singles chart and No. 13 on the US Billboard Hot 100, and was the only American hit from the album to reach the top 20. During November, John toured Brazil, Argentina, Chile, Peru, Switzerland, Poland, France, Italy, the UK, Japan, and other countries two months later. Several songs from the album made it to the subsequent Made in England Tour's playlist, including "Believe," "Made in England," "House," "Blessed," "Lies," and "Pain".

On "Belfast," the song originally ended simply with John singing the last line, "Belfast." In an interview with fan magazine East End Lights some time later, arranger Paul Buckmaster (in his first project with John since 1978's A Single Man) said he thought the song needed a more uplifting end, and added the outro, making it sound as if it were being played in an Irish pub somewhere up the road. John reportedly was initially wary of the idea, but Buckmaster said he changed his mind upon hearing it and approved the new coda for the final version. George Martin, who owned AIR Studios London where the album was recorded, wrote the horn and string arrangement on "Latitude." John and Guy Babylon are credited as arrangers on "Man," which also included organ by Paul Carrack.

== Singles ==
UK release date	Single	Notes	Peak positions
20 February 1995	"Believe"	Worldwide release	No. 1 CAN, No. 15 UK, No. 13 US
8 May 1995	"Made in England"	Worldwide release	No. 5 CAN, No. 18 UK, No. 52 US
18 December 1995	"Blessed"	UK single was withdrawn	No. 3 CAN, No. 34 US
22 January 1996	"Please"	Released in the UK	No. 33 UK

== Track listing ==
All tracks are written by Elton John and Bernie Taupin.

No.	Title	Length
1.	"Believe"	4:55
2.	"Made in England"	5:09
3.	"House"	4:27
4.	"Cold"	5:37
5.	"Pain"	3:49
6.	"Belfast"	6:29
7.	"Latitude"	3:34
8.	"Please"	3:52
9.	"Man"	5:16
10.	"Lies"	4:25
11.	"Blessed"	5:01
Total length:		52:34

== Outtakes ==
There are many outtakes from Made in England. These songs include "Building a Bird", "Leaves", "Hell", "Skin", "Tick-Tock", "Undone", "Red", "Live Like Horses", an alternate version of "Belfast", and an alternate version of "Believe". "Red" was later released on the French compilation Sol En Si and a version of "Live Like Horses" was later released on The Big Picture. "Building a Bird" was recorded by Nigel Olsson for his 2001 Move the Universe album, released only in Japan. "Hell" and the original cut of "Live Like Horses" have circulated on YouTube. The remaining outtakes have yet to circulate.

== Personnel ==
=== Musicians ===
- Elton John – vocals, acoustic piano, keyboards, harmonium, backing vocals (8), string arrangements (9)
- Guy Babylon – keyboards, programming, backing vocals (8), string arrangements (9)
- Teddy Borowiecki – accordion (6)
- Paul Carrack – Hammond organ (9)
- Davey Johnstone – guitars, mandolin, banjo, backing vocals (8)
- Bob Birch – bass, backing vocals (8)
- Charlie Morgan – drums
- Ray Cooper – percussion
- Paul Brennan – pipes (6), flute (6)
- Dermont Crehan – violin solo (6)
- Paul Buckmaster – orchestral arrangements and conductor (1, 3, 4, 6)
- George Martin – string and French horn arrangements (7), conductor (7)
- Gavyn Wright – orchestra leader (6), conductor (9)
- The London Session Orchestra – orchestra (1, 3, 4, 6, 7, 9)

=== Production ===
- Elton John – producer
- Greg Penny – producer, mixing
- Jon Ingoldsby – recording, mixing
- Andy Strange – assistant engineer
- Chris Bellman – mastering at Bernie Grundman Mastering (Hollywood, California)
- Adrian Collee – studio coordination
- Steve Brown – album coordination
- Pete Mills – drum and guitar technician
- Bill Harrison – percussion technician
- Greg Gorman – photography
- Wherefore Art? – design
- John Reid – management

== Accolades ==
=== Grammy Awards ===
Year	Nominee / work	Award	Result
1996	"Believe"	Best Pop Vocal Performance – Male	Nominated

=== American Music Awards ===
Year	Nominee / work	Award	Result
1996	Elton John (performer)	Favorite Pop/Rock Male Artist	Nominated

== Charts ==
=== Weekly charts ===
Weekly chart performance for Made in England
Chart (1995)	Peak position
Australian Albums (ARIA)	6
Austrian Albums (Ö3 Austria)	1
Belgian Albums (Ultratop Flanders)	8
Belgian Albums (Ultratop Wallonia)	5
Canada Top Albums/CDs (RPM)	3
Danish Albums (Tracklisten)	5
Dutch Albums (Album Top 100)	11
Estonian Albums (Eesti Top 10)	2
European Top 100 Albums (Music & Media)	4
Finnish Albums (The Official Finnish Charts)	9
French Albums (SNEP)	2
German Albums (Offizielle Top 100)	4
Hungarian Albums (MAHASZ)	17
Italian Albums (Musica e Dischi)	4
Japanese Albums (Oricon)	13
New Zealand Albums (RMNZ)	10
Norwegian Albums (VG-lista)	3
Portuguese Albums (AFP)	6
Scottish Albums (Official Charts)	6
Spanish Albums (AFYVE)	3
Swedish Albums (Sverigetopplistan)	8
Swiss Albums (Schweizer Hitparade)	1
UK Albums (Official Charts)	3
US Billboard 200	13

=== Year-end charts ===
Year-end chart performance for Made in England
Chart (1995)	Position
Austrian Albums (Ö3 Austria Top 40)	9
Belgian Albums (Ultratop Flanders)	79
Belgian Albums (Ultratop Wallonia)	27
Canada Top Albums/CDs (RPM)	46
French Albums (SNEP)	51
German Albums (Offizielle Top 100)	29
Swiss Albums (Schweizer Hitparade)	12
US Billboard 200	89

== Certifications and sales ==
Region	Certification	Certified units/sales
Austria (IFPI Austria)	Platinum	50,000^{*}
Canada (Music Canada)	2× Platinum	200,000^{^}
France (SNEP)	2× Gold	200,000^{*}
Germany (BVMI)	Gold	250,000^{^}
Japan (RIAJ)	Gold	101,130
New Zealand (RMNZ)	Gold	7,500^{^}
Spain (Promusicae)	Platinum	100,000^{^}
Sweden (GLF)	Gold	50,000^{^}
Switzerland (IFPI Switzerland)	Platinum	50,000^{^}
United Kingdom (BPI)	Gold	100,000^{^}
United States (RIAA)	Platinum	1,000,000^{^}
Summaries
Europe (IFPI)	Platinum	1,000,000^{*}
Worldwide	—	3,400,000
^{*} Sales figures based on certification alone.^{^} Shipments figures based on certification alone.
