= Recover Your Soul =

Single by Elton John

from the album The Big Picture
- B-side: "Big Man in a Little Suit"; "I Know Why I'm in Love"; "Recover Your Soul" (album version)
- Released: 1 April 1998
- Recorded: November 1996 – May 1997
- Studio: Townhouse (London); AIR (London)
- Genre: Pop
- Length: 4:16 (single remix); 5:18 (album version)
- Label: Mercury; Rocket
- Songwriters: Elton John; Bernie Taupin
- Producer: Chris Thomas

Elton John singles chronology
| "Something About the Way You Look Tonight" / "Candle in the Wind 1997" (1997) | "Recover Your Soul" (1998) | "If the River Can Bend" (1998) |

Music video
- "Recover Your Soul" on YouTube

"Recover Your Soul" is a song by British musician Elton John and lyricist Bernie Taupin, performed by John. It was released in April 1998 by Mercury and Rocket as the second single from John's twenty-fifth studio album The Big Picture (1997). In the UK it was released on February 2 and entered the charts the following week.

The song passed a little bit in the shadow of a huge-success single "Something About the Way You Look Tonight" / "Candle in the Wind 1997", it reached the top 20 in the UK charts, but stalled at number 55 in the US Billboard Hot 100. John played this song a couple of times in between 1998 and 1999.

== Charts ==
=== Weekly charts ===
| Chart (1998) | Peak position |
|---|---|
| Australia (ARIA) | 92 |
| France (SNEP) | 98 |
| Germany (GfK) | 73 |
| UK Singles (Official Charts) | 16 |
| US Billboard Hot 100 | 55 |
| US Adult Contemporary (Billboard) | 5 |

=== Year-end charts ===
| Chart (1998) | Position |
|---|---|
| US Adult Contemporary (Billboard) | 18 |
