= Peter Manning (conductor) =

British conductor and violinist

Peter Manning FRSA (born 17 July 1956) is a British conductor and violinist.

== Biography ==
Manning was born in Manchester on 17 July 1956. His conducting career includes work with the Royal Philharmonic Chamber Orchestra, the Edsberg Chamber Orchestra, BBC Symphony Orchestra, Odense Symphony Orchestra, Musica Vitae and the Soloists of The Royal Opera House. He is currently (2015) Concertmaster of The Royal Opera House and Artistic Director of Musica Vitae, Sweden, The Soloists of The Royal Opera House and guest Conductor Dallas Opera Texas USA. He is also Artistic Director of Manning Camerata, the classical group for the 21st century which he started in 2005 to create innovative events that are centred on music and invigorate other disciplines.

Manning first began to play the violin when he was five. He attended Chetham's School of Music and studied in this country with Yossi Zivoni, with Josef Gingold in the US and with Nathan Milstein. He won all the major string prizes at the Royal Northern College of Music and graduated with distinction in performance. Major scholarships from the Royal Society of Arts, the Martin Musical Scholarship, the Harold Craxton Memorial Trust and Indiana University enabled him to continue his studies. Before leaving for the US he was prize winner in the Anderson International Violin Competition and first prize winner and gold medallist in the Royal Overseas League Competition.

He was appointed as Professor of the Violin at the Royal Northern College of Music in 1981, a post he relinquished in 1983 when he was invited to become Leader of the London Philharmonic. After gaining great experience working with conductors such as Sir Georg Solti, Klaus Tennstedt, Sir Simon Rattle, Bernard Haitink and Evgeny Svetlanov, Peter left the Orchestra to form the Britten String Quartet and to concentrate on his solo career.

Manning founded the Britten Quartet in 1986 which established an international reputation and discography, making, during its ten years, over 20 recordings. The Britten Quartet was the first British Quartet to be offered an exclusive EMI contract and recorded a substantial 20 disc discography including works by Beethoven, Schubert, Schnittke, Ravel, Verdi, Brahms, Cherubini, Janáček, Tippett, Prokofieff, Britten and Vaughan Williams.

Manning made his Royal Festival Hall debut with the Philharmonia in a live radio broadcast. Since then he has appeared with the City of Birmingham Symphony Orchestra, the Hallé, the Ulster, the London Mozart Players, the London Philharmonic, the Philharmonia, the BBC Concert Orchestra, the Scottish Chamber Orchestra, BBC Scottish, the Hong Kong Philharmonic and the Royal Philharmonic, the Oulu Chamber Orchestra and the Gothenburg Symphony Orchestra.

Manning has toured France, Germany, the Netherlands, Belgium, Spain, Scandinavia, the Far East, the US, South America and Russia with appearances at major venues. He is the recipient of the German Recording Industry's Schallplattenpreis.

Manning has a wide-ranging repertory and is active in orchestrating arrangements and the commissioning of new works for choreography and theatre. He is published by Universal Edition Vienna and Schott London and in addition to his Schnittke arrangements for orchestra he has recently had his arrangements of Tippet String Quartets for Orchestra published.

Manning is a fellow of the Royal Society of Arts and the Royal Northern College of Music, an honorary member of the Royal College of Music and a trustee of the Campaign for the Arts. In 2013 he was appointed joint Professor of new work at the University of Edinburgh and the Royal Conservatoire of Scotland to develop new work for the Edinburgh International festivals and established the Oxygen festival.

He appeared as a violinist in the film adaptation of Frederick Forsyth's novel The Fourth Protocol.
