= T-Bone Burnett Presents The Speaking Clock Revue: Live from the Beacon Theatre =

Live album by T Bone Burnett
- Released: 2011
- Genre: Rock
- Producer: T Bone Burnett

T Bone Burnett chronology
Tooth of Crime (2008)	T-Bone Burnett Presents The Speaking Clock Revue: Live from the Beacon Theatre (2011)	A Place at the Table (2013)

T-Bone Burnett Presents The Speaking Clock Revue: Live from the Beacon Theatre is a 2011 live album featuring various musicians such as Elton John, Leon Russell, John Mellencamp, Elvis Costello, Gregg Allman, Ralph Stanley, Jeff Bridges and T Bone Burnett.

== Track listing ==
1. "Jimmie Standing in the Rain" by Elvis Costello – 5:57
2. "Midnight Rider" by Gregg Allman – 3:26
3. "Hold On, Hold On" by Neko Case – 2:55
4. "Rye Whiskey" by Punch Brothers – 3:33
5. "Wonderful (The Way I Feel)" by Yim Yames – 4:26
6. "The Truth Is in the Dirt" by Karen Elson – 4:16
7. "The One I Love Is Gone" by the Secret Sisters – 4:08
8. "Troubled Land" by John Mellencamp – 3:55
9. "Lift Him Up That's All" by Ralph Stanley – 3:47
10. "Fallin' & Flyin'" by Jeff Bridges – 3:26
11. "Monkey Suit" by Elton John and Leon Russell – 5:13
