= Something About the Way You Look Tonight =

1997 single by Elton John

Single by Elton John

from the album The Big Picture
- B-side: "I Know Why I'm in Love"; "No Valentines"
- Released: 8 September 1997
- Recorded: 13 January 1997
- Studio: Townhouse (London, England)
- Genre: Quiet storm, pop rock
- Length: 3:59 (single edit); 5:13 (album version)
- Label: Mercury; Rocket
- Songwriters: Elton John; Bernie Taupin
- Producer: Chris Thomas

Elton John singles chronology
"Live Like Horses" (1996)	"Something About the Way You Look Tonight" (1997)	"Something About the Way You Look Tonight" / "Candle in the Wind 1997" (1997)

"Something About the Way You Look Tonight" / "Candle in the Wind 1997"

Single by Elton John

from the album The Big Picture
- A-side: "Candle in the Wind 1997"
- B-side: "You Can Make History (Young Again)"
- Released: 13 September 1997
- Length: 3:59 ("Something About the Way You Look Tonight"); 4:09 ("Candle in the Wind 1997")
- Label: Mercury; Rocket
- Songwriters: Elton John; Bernie Taupin
- Producer: Chris Thomas

Elton John singles chronology
"Something About the Way You Look Tonight" (1997)	"Something About the Way You Look Tonight" / "Candle in the Wind 1997" (1997)	"Recover Your Soul" (1998)

"Something About the Way You Look Tonight" is a song by British musician Elton John and lyricist Bernie Taupin, performed by John. It was included on John's 25th studio album, The Big Picture (1997). It was produced by Chris Thomas and released as the album's first single on 8 September 1997 by Mercury Records and the Rocket Record Company.

Five days after the song's solo release, it was issued as a double A-side single with "Candle in the Wind 1997". That single and its video were dedicated to the memory of Diana, Princess of Wales, who died that year, with proceeds from the sale of the single going towards Diana's charities. According to the Recording Industry Association of America, with certified sales, this double A-side is "the best-selling single of all time". The Guinness World Records 2009 states that the song is "the biggest-selling single since UK and US singles charts began in the 1950s, having accumulated worldwide sales of 33 million copies".

== Music video ==
The video for the song was directed by Tim Royes and features John singing and playing piano to an empty theatre, as well as actors Ramon Tikaram and Luisa Bradshaw-White who played Ferdy and Kira in the hit BBC television programme This Life, and supermodels Kate Moss and Sophie Dahl. Many consider it to be one of John's best videos. He has publicly revealed (through his "warts and all" documentary Tantrums and Tiaras) that he finds videos "fucking loathsome" and after the videos from his album The Big Picture refrained from appearing in his own videos unless they were cameo appearances.

== Sales and chart positions ==
In the UK alone, the double A-side single with "Candle in the Wind 1997" sold over 4,930,000 copies (8× platinum), making the song the best-selling single ever in UK history. It remained for five weeks at the number-one position. In the US, the double A-side single spent 14 weeks at number one on the Billboard Hot 100. The best-selling single in Billboard history and the only single ever certified diamond in the US from purely physical sales, the single sold over 11 million copies in the US.

On the US Adult Contemporary chart, "Something About the Way You Look Tonight" and "Candle in the Wind 1997" charted separately; while the tribute to Princess Diana peaked at number two on this chart, "Something About the Way You Look Tonight" spent 10 weeks at number one in late 1997 into early 1998. This double-sided single holds the record for the fewest weeks in a chart year from a year-end number-one single, with as few as eight. (In 1998, it had 34 more total weeks, and was number eight in the year-end list of 1998.)

After this song, John was unable to reach the top spot of the US Adult Contemporary chart for 24 years until his collaboration with Ed Sheeran, titled "Merry Christmas" reached number one for five weeks.

== Critical reception ==
Billboard magazine said the song is a "grandly executed ballad that washes John's larger-than-life performance in cinematic strings and whooping, choir-styled backing vocals. An instant fave for die-hards, this single will bring kids at top 40 to the table after a few spins." Music & Media wrote that "this single proves that Elton John's composing and performing skills are as good as ever. A ballad, boasting a classy string arrangement by Anne Dudley of Art of Noise fame, it's vaguely reminiscent of another John/Taupin composition, 1973's Candle in the Wind, but it's too original to be called a ripoff."

== Personnel ==
- Elton John – piano, vocals
- Davey Johnstone – guitars
- John Jorgenson – guitars
- Bob Birch – bass guitar
- Guy Babylon – keyboards
- Charlie Morgan – drums and percussion
- Paul Carrack – organ
- Carol Kenyon – backing vocals
- Jackie Rawe – backing vocals
- Strings arranged by Guy Babylon and Anne Dudley
- Anne Dudley – conducting

== Charts ==
The following chart entries are for "Something About the Way You Look Tonight" as a solo single.

=== Weekly charts ===
Weekly chart performance for "Something About the Way You Look Tonight"
Chart (1997–1998)	Peak position
Australia (ARIA)	32
Austria (Ö3 Austria Top 40)	20
Canada Top Singles (RPM)	13
Canada Adult Contemporary (RPM)	1
Estonia (Eesti Top 20)	8
Estonia Airplay (Eesti Top 25)	6
Germany (GfK)	73
Iceland (Íslenski Listinn Topp 40)	29
Italy (Musica e dischi)	8
Italy Airplay (Music & Media)	10
Netherlands (Single Top 100)	94
Spain (AFYVE)	3
US Adult Contemporary (Billboard)	1
US Adult Pop Airplay (Billboard)	12
US Pop Airplay (Billboard)	28

=== Year-end charts ===
1997 year-end chart performance for "Something About the Way You Look Tonight"
Chart (1997)	Position
Brazil (Crowley)	16
Canada Adult Contemporary (RPM)	22
Romania (Romanian Top 100)	83
US Adult Contemporary (Billboard)	23

1998 year-end chart performance for "Something About the Way You Look Tonight"
Chart (1998)	Position
Brazil (Crowley)	17
Canada Adult Contemporary (RPM)	31
US Adult Contemporary (Billboard)	3
US Adult Top 40 (Billboard)	49

== Release history ==
Release history and formats for "Something About the Way You Look Tonight"
Region	Version	Date	Format(s)	Label(s)	Ref.
United States	Solo release	26 August 1997	Contemporary hit radio	Rocket	
United Kingdom	Solo release	8 September 1997	CD; cassette	Mercury; Rocket	
Japan	Solo release	10 September 1997	CD	Mercury; Rocket	
United Kingdom	Double A-side	13 September 1997	CD; cassette	Mercury; Rocket	
United States	Double A-side	23 September 1997	7-inch vinyl; CD; cassette	Rocket	

== See also ==
- List of best-selling singles in Australia
