= Town of Plenty =

Single by Elton John

from the album Reg Strikes Back
- B-side: "Whipping Boy"
- Released: 22 August 1988
- Recorded: 1987–88
- Genre: Pop rock
- Length: 3:40
- Label: MCA Records (US); Rocket (UK)
- Songwriters: Elton John, Bernie Taupin
- Producer: Chris Thomas

Elton John singles chronology
"I Don't Wanna Go On with You Like That" (1988)	"Town of Plenty" (1988)	"A Word in Spanish" (1988)

"Town of Plenty" is a song by British musician Elton John and lyricist Bernie Taupin, performed by John. It is from the album Reg Strikes Back and was released in 1988. The song was the first album track to be heard after John's throat surgery. Pete Townshend of The Who plays acoustic guitar on the track, while Davey Johnstone plays electric. Among the backing vocalists contributing to the track are John's former bandmates Nigel Olsson and Dee Murray. This would be the final album of John's that Murray would contribute to, prior to his death from a stroke in 1992.

The single release of "Town of Plenty" was the second to be issued from Reg Strikes Back in the United Kingdom where it barely charted; it reached number 74 (one place above the lowest chart position available in 1988) and was gone by the next week. The single was not released in the US.

A limited edition 7-inch single was also issued, which included four postcards, each depicting John in a particular stage costume. This coincided with John's Sotheby's auction in which the costumes pictured were sold.

== B-side ==
The B-side to the single was "Whipping Boy" from the album Too Low for Zero, which was released five years earlier. A CD single of the release was also issued; this contained the two aforementioned tracks as well as "Saint" and "I Guess That's Why They Call It the Blues", also from Too Low for Zero.

== Charts ==
Chart (1988)	Position
UK Singles (OCC)	74

== Personnel ==
- Elton John – Roland RD-1000 digital piano, lead and harmony vocals
- Fred Mandel – synthesizers
- Davey Johnstone – electric guitar, backing vocals
- Pete Townshend – acoustic guitar
- David Paton – bass
- Charlie Morgan – drums
- Dee Murray – backing vocals
- Nigel Olsson – backing vocals
