= If the River Can Bend =

Single by Elton John

from the album The Big Picture
- Released: 1 June 1998
- Studio: Townhouse (London)
- Genre: Gospel; rock
- Length: 5:22
- Label: Rocket; Mercury
- Composer: Elton John
- Lyricist: Bernie Taupin
- Producer: Chris Thomas

Elton John singles chronology
"Recover Your Soul" (1998)	"If the River Can Bend" (1998)	"Written in the Stars" (1999)

"If the River Can Bend" is a song by British musician Elton John and lyricist Bernie Taupin, performed by John. The song was first released on John's twenty-fifth studio album The Big Picture (1997), and was later released as the album's third and final single on 1 June 1998.

== Overview ==
"If the River Can Bend" features vocals from the East London Gospel Choir. Charlie Morgan, who performs drums on the song, describes the track as an "inspirational Gospel tune", while Shana Naomi Krochmal of Vulture notes similarities between it and Paul Simon's 1986 album Graceland.

In His Song: The Musical Journey of Elton John by Elizabeth Rosenthal, the lyrics of "If the River Can Bend" are described as both "a testament to the faithfulness of lovers through thick, thin, and the winding paths of fate", as well as a reference to the longevity of John and Taupin's working partnership. Rosenthal believes the latter topic is displayed through the song's lyrical similarities to "Harmony" from Goodbye Yellow Brick Road (1973). Musically, Rosenthal considers the track to be the "first up-tempo" song on the album, noting its fusion of rock and Gospel and comparing it to earlier tracks "The Power" (a collaboration with Little Richard from John's 1993 album Duets) and "Bite Your Lip (Get Up and Dance!)" from Blue Moves (1976). In a 1997 interview with Billboard, John stated the song is about "all the possibilities if you're willing to change. Never give up, there's always hope. And there's so much more to do. But you have to be true to yourself, because you're creating your own future."

== Commercial performance ==
The song was released as the third and final single from The Big Picture on 1 June 1998. It became the album's third straight top 40 hit in the UK, where it peaked at number 32. In Germany, the song slid into the bottom of the top 100, peaking at number 95.

== Personnel ==
Adapted from the album's liner notes:

- Elton John – vocals, piano, organ
- Guy Babylon – keyboards
- Davey Johnstone – guitar
- John Jorgenson – guitar
- Bob Birch – bass guitar
- Charlie Morgan – drums
- East London Gospel Choir – vocals

== Charts ==
Chart (1998)	Peak position
Germany (GfK)	95
UK Singles (OCC)	32
