= A Word in Spanish =

- UK CD single cover

Single by Elton John

from the album Reg Strikes Back
- B-side: "Heavy Traffic"
- Released: 28 November 1988
- Length: 4:39
- Label: Rocket (All except North America); MCA (NA)
- Composer: Elton John
- Lyricist: Bernie Taupin
- Producer: Chris Thomas

Elton John singles chronology
| "Town of Plenty" (1988) | "A Word in Spanish" (1988) | "Mona Lisas and Mad Hatters (Part Two)" (remix) (1988) |

Music video
- "A Word in Spanish" on YouTube

"A Word in Spanish" is a song by the English musician Elton John, released as the third single in most countries except in North America where it was the album's second single, from his twenty-first studio album Reg Strikes Back (1988) on 26 November 1988.

== Background and release ==
"A Word in Spanish" alongside "The Camera Never Lies" were both recorded in early 1988 at James Newton Howard's home. Its release date has been subject to debate, while Music Week claims its release date to be 28 November 1988, Authors Elizabeth J. Rosenthal, Bernardin Claude and Tom Stanton claim its release date to be in September 1988. although most authors agree its North American release date is sometime in November 1988.

== Critical reception ==
Cashbox's writers called it a "Spanish-guitar tinged ballad written with the kind of originality that John-Taupin haven't really touched since the seventies." Vulture critic Shana Naomi Krochmal placed it number 165 in a ranking of every Elton John song in 2025, stating that "Bernie playing dumb about how Spanish works shouldn’t be this charming, but somehow Elton pulls it off." Jim Beviglia writes that "it’s a lovely track, featuring Latin music accents to complement the song title", notes that "the best he can do is quote a word he doesn’t even understand based on the impact it made in a movie he saw."

== Music video ==
A music video for "A Word in Spanish" was released featuring choreography by Kenny Ortega.

== Personnel ==
According to authors Romuald Ollivier and Olivier Roubin:

Musicians

- Elton John – vocals, synthesizers, organ
- Davey Johnstone – electric guitar, acoustic guitar, vocals
- David Paton – bass
- Charlie Morgan – drums
- Fred Mandel – synthesizers
- Dee Murray – vocals
- Nigel Olsson – vocals

Technical

- Chris Thomas – producer
- Bill Price – engineer
- Michael Mason – engineer
- Paul Wertheimer – engineer
- Karl Lever – assistant sound engineer
- Tim Young – mastering

== Charts ==
| Chart (1988) | Peak position |
|---|---|
| Germany (GfK) | 43 |
| Switzerland (Schweizer Hitparade) | 27 |
| UK Singles (Official Charts) | 91 |
| US Billboard Hot 100 | 19 |
| US Adult Contemporary (Billboard) | 4 |
| US Mainstream Rock (Billboard) | 42 |

== Bibliography ==
- Bernardin, Claude; Stanton, Tom (1996). Rocket Man: Elton John from A–Z. Greenwood Publishing Group. ISBN 978-0-275-95698-1.
- Ollivier, Romuald; Roubin, Olivier (4 April 2023). Elton John All the Songs: The Story Behind Every Track. Workman Publishing Company. ISBN 978-0-7624-7949-8.
- Rosenthal, Elizabeth J. (2001). His Song: The Musical Journey of Elton John. Billboard Books. ISBN 0-8230-8892-8.
- Strong, Martin (2004). The Great Rock Discography. Edinburgh and New York: Canongate. ISBN 978-1-84195-615-2. Archived from the original on 22 January 2023.
