= Love Songs (Elton John album) =

Compilation album by Elton John
- Released: 6 November 1995 (UK); 24 September 1996 (US)
- Recorded: 1970–1996
- Genres: Rock, pop
- Length: 70:50
- Label: Rocket
- Producers: Gus Dudgeon, Chris Thomas, Greg Penny

Elton John chronology
Made in England (1995)	Love Songs (1995)	The Big Picture (1997)

Singles from Love Songs [US version]
- 1. "You Can Make History (Young Again)" Released: October 1996

Professional ratings
Review scores
Source	Rating
AllMusic	3/5 stars
Billboard	(favorable)
The Encyclopedia of Popular Music	3/5 stars
Music Week	4/5 stars

Love Songs is a compilation album by British musician Elton John. It was released on 6 November 1995 by John's own label The Rocket Record Company, in conjunction with Mercury Records, and in North America by MCA Records on 24 September 1996. In the US, it was certified gold in December 1996, platinum in March 1997, double platinum in December 1998 and triple platinum in August 2000 by the RIAA.

It was a major success on its release, topping the album charts in three countries and certified platinum in eleven countries and multi-platinum in seven. It spawned a music video compilation, which was originally released on LaserDisc, VHS and VCD.

== Background ==
Elton John had originally released an album called Love Songs in 1982 through his own label, The Rocket Record Company. It focused mostly on the period of 1976–1982, when John and Bernie Taupin took a break in their collaboration and John was mostly writing with other lyricists such as Gary Osborne and Tim Rice. "Blue Eyes" and "Sorry Seems to Be the Hardest Word" are the only two songs from that album are featured in this new collection.

On the US version, ten of the fifteen tracks had been released in the period since the now-deleted Greatest Hits Volume 3 collection, including John's second tenure on MCA Records and two songs from the then-recent Made in England. (Two of these tracks, however, were live versions of old songs, namely "Candle in the Wind" and "Don't Let the Sun Go Down on Me"). "You Can Make History (Young Again)" and "No Valentines" were the two new songs made specifically for this release.

The UK version saw an alternate track order with the inclusion of such songs as "I Guess That's Why They Call It the Blues", "Nikita", "True Love" (a duet with Kiki Dee), "Please", "Song for Guy", and the original version of "Candle in the Wind". In addition, "Blessed" is represented as the single edit on both versions. "You Can Make History (Young Again)" and "No Valentines" did not appear on this version since they were recorded after its release.

== Track listing ==
All tracks are written by Elton John and Bernie Taupin, except where noted.

European version
No.	Title	Writer(s)	Album	Length
1.	"Sacrifice"		Sleeping with the Past (1989)	5:07
2.	"Candle in the Wind"		Goodbye Yellow Brick Road (1973)	3:48
3.	"I Guess That's Why They Call It the Blues"	John; Taupin; Davey Johnstone	Too Low for Zero (1983)	4:42
4.	"Don't Let the Sun Go Down on Me" (live duet with George Michael)		"Don't Let the Sun Go Down on Me" single (1991)	5:47
5.	"Sorry Seems to Be the Hardest Word"		Blue Moves (1976)	3:48
6.	"Blue Eyes"	John; Gary Osborne	Jump Up! (1982)	3:26
7.	"Daniel"		Don't Shoot Me I'm Only the Piano Player (1973)	3:53
8.	"Nikita" (single edit)		Ice on Fire (1985)	4:52
9.	"Your Song"		Elton John (1970)	4:01
10.	"The One"		The One (1992)	5:52
11.	"Someone Saved My Life Tonight"		Captain Fantastic and the Brown Dirt Cowboy (1975)	6:45
12.	"True Love" (duet with Kiki Dee)	Cole Porter	Duets	3:32
13.	"Can You Feel the Love Tonight"	John; Tim Rice	The Lion King (1994)	4:00
14.	"Circle of Life"	John; Rice	The Lion King	4:49
15.	"Blessed" (single edit)		Made in England (1995)	4:06
16.	"Please"		Made in England	3:52
17.	"Song for Guy" (single edit)	John	A Single Man (1978)	5:04
Total length:				77:24

Australian version
No.	Title	Writer(s)	Original release	Length
1.	"Sacrifice"		Sleeping with the Past	5:07
2.	"Candle in the Wind"		Goodbye Yellow Brick Road	3:48
3.	"Don't Let the Sun Go Down on Me" (live duet with George Michael)		"Don't Let the Sun Go Down on Me" single	5:47
4.	"Sorry Seems to Be the Hardest Word"		Blue Moves	3:48
5.	"Blue Eyes"	John; Osborne	Jump Up!	3:26
6.	"Daniel"		Don't Shoot Me I'm Only the Piano Player	3:53
7.	"Nikita" (single edit)		Ice on Fire	4:52
8.	"Your Song"		Elton John	4:01
9.	"The One"		The One	5:52
10.	"Someone Saved My Life Tonight"		Captain Fantastic and the Brown Dirt Cowboy	6:45
11.	"True Love" (duet with Kiki Dee)	Porter	Duets	3:32
12.	"Can You Feel the Love Tonight"	John; Rice	The Lion King	4:00
13.	"Circle of Life"	John; Rice	The Lion King	4:49
14.	"Believe"		Made in England	4:44
15.	"Blessed" (single edit)		Made in England	4:06
16.	"Please"		Made in England	3:52
17.	"Song for Guy" (single edit)	John	A Single Man	5:04
Total length:				77:24

North American version
No.	Title	Writer(s)	Original release	Length
1.	"Can You Feel the Love Tonight"	John; Rice	The Lion King	4:03
2.	"The One"		The One	5:55
3.	"Sacrifice"		Sleeping with the Past	5:10
4.	"Daniel"		Don't Shoot Me I'm Only the Piano Player	3:55
5.	"Someone Saved My Life Tonight"		Captain Fantastic and the Brown Dirt Cowboy	6:47
6.	"Your Song"		Elton John	4:03
7.	"Don't Let the Sun Go Down on Me" (live duet with George Michael)		"Don't Let the Sun Go Down on Me" single	5:50
8.	"Believe"		Made in England	4:44
9.	"Blue Eyes"	John; Osborne	Jump Up!	3:30
10.	"Sorry Seems to Be the Hardest Word"		Blue Moves	3:50
11.	"Blessed"		Made in England	4:06
12.	"Candle in the Wind" (live)		Live in Australia with the Melbourne Symphony Orchestra	4:02
13.	"You Can Make History (Young Again)"		previously unreleased	4:57
14.	"No Valentines"		previously unreleased	4:11
15.	"Circle of Life"	John; Rice	The Lion King	4:50
Total length:				70:51

=== Notes ===
- Due to a production error, the US CD booklet and cassette lyric sheet provide the lyrics for "I Guess That's Why They Call It the Blues" directly after "Candle in the Wind".
- The phonographic copyright of the compilation is owned by William A. Bong Ltd. and is exclusively licensed to Mercury Records Ltd.

== Music video compilation ==
1. "Sacrifice"
2. "Candle in the Wind (Live in Australia, 1984)"
3. "I Guess That's Why They Call It the Blues"
4. "Don't Let the Sun Go Down on Me" (Live duet with George Michael)
5. "Sorry Seems to Be the Hardest Word (Live in Barcelona, 1992)"
6. "Blue Eyes"
7. "Daniel (Live in Australia, 1984)"
8. "Nikita"
9. "Your Song (Live at Wembley Stadium, 1984)"
10. "The One"
11. "Someone Saved My Life Tonight (Live in Edinburgh, 1976)"
12. "True Love" (Duet with Kiki Dee)
13. "Can You Feel the Love Tonight"
14. "Circle of Life"
15. "Blessed"
16. "Please"
17. "Song for Guy (Live in Australia, 1984)"
18. "Believe"

== Charts ==
=== Weekly charts ===
Chart performance for Love Songs
Chart (1995–2007)	Peak position
Australian Albums (ARIA)	7
Austrian Albums (Ö3 Austria)	4
Belgian Albums (Ultratop Flanders)	5
Belgian Albums (Ultratop Wallonia)	4
Canadian Albums (Billboard)	12
Canadian Albums (RPM)	11
Chilean Albums (APF)	1
Danish Albums (IFPI)	4
Dutch Albums (Album Top 100)	3
Estonian Albums (Eesti Top 10)	2
Finnish Albums (Suomen virallinen lista)	2
French Compilations (SNEP)	1
German Albums (Offizielle Top 100)	7
Hungarian Albums (MAHASZ)	8
Italian Albums (FIMI)	2
Japanese Albums (Oricon)	9
New Zealand Albums (RMNZ)	1
Norwegian Albums (VG-lista)	1
Portuguese Albums (AFP)	2
Scottish Albums (Official Charts)	4
Spanish Albums (AFYVE)	8
Swedish Albums (Sverigetopplistan)	2
Swiss Albums (Schweizer Hitparade)	2
UK Albums (Official Charts)	4
US Billboard 200	24
US Top Catalog Albums (Billboard)	17

=== Year-end charts ===
Year-end chart performance for Love Songs
Chart (1995)	Position
Finnish Albums (Suomen virallinen lista)	61
French Albums (SNEP)	40
Japanese Albums (Oricon)	75
Norwegian Albums (VG-lista)	62
UK Albums (OCC)	12

Chart (1996)	Position
Australian Albums (ARIA)	47
Austrian Albums (Ö3 Austria)	32
Finnish Albums (Suomen virallinen lista)	25
German Albums (Offizielle Top 100)	43
Japanese Albums (Oricon)	83
Norwegian Albums (VG-lista)	51
Swiss Albums (Schweizer Hitparade)	19
UK Albums (OCC)	77

Chart (1997)	Position
Belgian Albums (Ultratop Flanders)	56
US Billboard 200	82

== Certifications ==
Sales certifications for Love Songs
Region	Certification	Certified units/sales
Argentina (CAPIF)	2× Platinum	120,000^{^}
Australia (ARIA)	3× Platinum	210,000^{^}
Austria (IFPI Austria)	Platinum	50,000^{*}
Belgium (BRMA)	Platinum	50,000^{*}
Brazil (Pro-Música Brasil)	Platinum	250,000^{*}
Canada (Music Canada)	2× Platinum	200,000^{^}
Chile	Platinum	25,000
Finland (Musiikkituottajat)	Platinum	63,250
France (SNEP)	2× Platinum	600,000^{*}
Germany (BVMI)	Platinum	500,000^{^}
Hong Kong (IFPI Hong Kong)	3× Platinum	60,000^{*}
Hungary (MAHASZ)	Gold	10,000
Indonesia	2× Gold	50,000
Japan (RIAJ)	Gold	140,000
Mexico (AMPROFON)	Gold	100,000^{^}
Netherlands (NVPI)	Platinum	100,000^{^}
New Zealand (RMNZ)	2× Platinum	30,000^{^}
Norway (IFPI Norway)	2× Platinum	100,000^{*}
Poland (ZPAV)	Gold	50,000^{*}
Portugal (AFP)	Platinum	40,000^{^}
Spain (Promusicae)	Platinum	100,000^{^}
South Africa (RISA)	Platinum	50,000^{*}
Sweden (GLF)	Platinum	100,000^{^}
Switzerland (IFPI Switzerland)	2× Platinum	100,000^{^}
Taiwan (RIT)	2× Platinum	100,000
United Kingdom (BPI)	3× Platinum	900,000^{^}
United States (RIAA)	3× Platinum	3,000,000^{^}
Summaries
Europe (IFPI)	5× Platinum	5,000,000^{*}
^{*} Sales figures based on certification alone.^{^} Shipments figures based on certification alone.

== Release history ==
Region	Date	Label	Format	Catalogue
Europe	6 November 1995	Rocket/Mercury Records	CD	528,788-2
North America	24 September 1996	MCA Records	Cassette	MCAC-11481
North America	24 September 1996	MCA Records	CD	MCAD-11481
United States	2001	Island Records	CD	314,548,841-2
