= Mona Lisas and Mad Hatters (Part Two) =

Single by Elton John

from the album Reg Strikes Back
- B-side: "A Word in Spanish"
- Released: November 1988
- Recorded: 1987
- Genre: Rock, Latin jazz, dance
- Length: 4:12 (album version); 6:19 (12" Renaissance version)
- Label: Rocket
- Songwriters: Elton John, Bernie Taupin
- Producer: Chris Thomas

Elton John singles chronology
"A Word in Spanish" (1988)	"Mona Lisas and Mad Hatters (Part Two)" (1988)	"Through the Storm" (1989)

"Mona Lisas and Mad Hatters (Part Two)" is a song by British musician Elton John and lyricist Bernie Taupin, performed by John. It is from John's album Reg Strikes Back. It was released as a 12" single in 1988 only in the United States. The single did not include the basic version from Reg Strikes Back album.

Although not a particularly popular song, some critics judged it as a "most intriguing" song or the "brightest moment" of the album. John said: "That's probably my favorite track on the album. It just has a great New York feel". He played both versions of the song sequentially in concerts from the release of "Mona Lisas and Mad Hatters (Part Two)" in 1988 through to 1993.

== Lyrics and composition ==
The song is about New York City and is a continuation of the song "Mona Lisas and Mad Hatters" from the 1972 album Honky Château. Although the song follows the same meaning of its predecessor, it has a very different tempo and instrumental arrangement, and is in many ways a more complex song, with a variety of key changes and unusual chords throughout the song. There is also a brief homage to the Beatles' song "Drive My Car" that can be heard during the trumpet solo, where Elton and the backup singers interject "beep beep, beep beep, yeah!".

== Track listing ==
12"

1. "Mona Lisas and Mad Hatters Part Two (The Renaissance Mix)" – 6:15
2. "Mona Lisas and Mad Hatters Part Two (The Da Vinci Version)" – 4:47
3. "A Word in Spanish" – 4:35
4. "Mona Lisas and Mad Hatters Part Two (Self Portrait Instrumental)" – 4:55

== Personnel ==
- Elton John – Roland RD-1000 digital piano, lead vocals
- Fred Mandel – synthesizers
- Davey Johnstone – electric guitars, backing vocals
- David Paton – bass
- Charlie Morgan – drums
- Dee Murray – backing vocals
- Nigel Olsson – backing vocals
- Freddie Hubbard – trumpet, flugelhorn
