= Candle in the Wind 1997 =

1997 single by Elton John

"Something About the Way You Look Tonight" / "Candle in the Wind 1997"
- CD single cover

Single by Elton John
- B-side: "You Can Make History (Young Again)"
- Released: 13 September 1997
- Genre: Pop rock
- Length: 3:59 ("Something About the Way You Look Tonight"); 4:11 ("Candle in the Wind 1997")
- Label: Rocket; A&M
- Songwriters: Elton John; Bernie Taupin
- Producer: George Martin

Elton John singles chronology
"Live Like Horses" (1996)	"Something About the Way You Look Tonight" / "Candle in the Wind 1997" (1997)	"Recover Your Soul" (1998)

Audio sample
- file; help

Audio
- "Candle in the Wind 1997" by Elton John on YouTube

"Candle in the Wind 1997", also known as "Goodbye England's Rose" and "Candle in the Wind '97", is a song by British musician Elton John and lyricist Bernie Taupin, performed by John. A new version of John's 1973 song "Candle in the Wind", it was produced by George Martin and released on 13 September 1997 as a tribute to Diana, Princess of Wales, who died in a car crash two weeks prior. Global proceeds went towards Diana's charities. In many countries, it was pressed as a double A-side with "Something About the Way You Look Tonight".

The original "Candle in the Wind", also written by Taupin, was a tribute to Marilyn Monroe. John and Taupin adapted the lyrics to suit the circumstances of Diana's life and death at 36 like Monroe. The opening lines, "Goodbye Norma Jean / though I never knew you at all", were adapted to "Goodbye England's rose / May you ever grow in our hearts".

"Candle in the Wind 1997" entered at number one on the UK singles chart after only one day of sales, giving John his fourth UK number-one single, and became the best-selling single in UK chart history. In October it became John's ninth US number-one single; it topped the Billboard Hot 100 for 14 weeks and is the best-selling single in Billboard history. It was the first single certified Diamond in the US. The song also topped the German Singles Chart for seven weeks, the Australian Singles Chart for six weeks, and many other music charts around the world. According to the Guinness Book of Records, "Candle in the Wind 1997" is the second highest-selling physical single of all time (behind Bing Crosby's "White Christmas" from 1942), and the highest-selling single since charts began in the 1950s.

John won the Grammy Award for Best Male Pop Vocal Performance at the 40th Grammy Awards ceremony in 1998. At the 1998 Brit Awards the song was nominated for the Brit Award for Best British Single.

== Background ==
On 31 August 1997, Diana, Princess of Wales, died in a car crash in Paris, France. The news shocked John, as he and the Princess were good friends. A month earlier, he had also lost another good friend, fashion designer Gianni Versace. Pictures depicting Diana appearing to console a distraught John at Versace's funeral were featured prominently in news coverage throughout the world.

I thought it was very important to project it from a nation's standpoint. I wanted to make it sound like a country singing it. From the first couple of lines I wrote [which began "Goodbye England's Rose"], the rest sort of fell into place

— Bernie Taupin on writing the lyrics for "Candle in the Wind 1997"

To cope with the grief, John wanted to pay a tribute to Diana. In his autobiography, Me, John says he had a phone call from Richard Branson who said that many of those writing in the book of condolence at St James's Palace were quoting the lyrics of "Candle in the Wind". Branson asked John if he would rewrite the lyrics and sing them at the funeral. John believed that Branson had been contacted by the Spencer family. John contacted his songwriting partner Bernie Taupin, asking him to revise the lyrics of their 1973 song "Candle in the Wind" to honour her. George Martin was contacted to help produce the song, and added a string quartet (Peter Manning, Keith Pascoe, Levine Andrade, and Andrew Shulman), and woodwind (Pippa Davies, flute and oboe) to help balance the recording. It was recorded at Townhouse Studios in West London, immediately following the funeral.

John publicly performed "Candle in the Wind 1997" only once, at the funeral of Diana, Princess of Wales, in Westminster Abbey on 6 September 1997. The performance was included on Diana, Princess of Wales: The BBC Recording of the Funeral Service, released on 30 September 1997. John continued to sing the original version of the song at his concerts but repeatedly turned down requests to perform the revised version, even for the memorial Concert for Diana in July 2007, having vowed never to perform it again unless asked by Diana's sons.

== Chart performance ==
"Candle in the Wind 1997" became the fastest-selling single in the UK, selling 658,000 copies on its first day of release and over 1.5 million in its first week. The song debuted at number one on the UK singles chart the day after its release on 13 September 1997, staying at number one for five weeks and becoming the best-selling song in the UK, overtaking the 13-year-old record held by Band Aid's "Do They Know It's Christmas?" It is the best-selling single of all time in the UK, and has sold 4.94 million copies in the UK as of September 2017.

The chart success in the US was similar. Released on 23 September 1997, "Candle in the Wind 1997" debuted at number one on the Billboard Hot 100, with first week sales at 3.5 million copies. The single stayed at the top for the Hot 100 for 14 consecutive weeks (until 17 January 1998), a record for a male solo artist. At first, Billboard listed "Candle in the Wind 1997" before "Something About the Way You Look Tonight" on its sales charts, but once airplay points for "Candle" had fallen below "Something" on 1 November 1997, the latter song took first position as per new chart rules regarding double A-side releases that took effect in March 1997. The single has sold 8,839,000 physical copies in the United States according to Nielsen SoundScan. Billboard ranked it as the number-one song for 1997 despite being on the chart for only eight weeks in the chart year, and it was the only number-one debut to top the Year-End Hot 100 until Ed Sheeran's "Shape of You" in 2017. It was on the chart for 35 more weeks, making it the number-eight song of 1998 and one of only nine songs in the history of the chart to be ranked on the top ten of two separate Hot 100-year-end charts, along with Chubby Checker's "The Twist", LeAnn Rimes' "How Do I Live", The Chainsmokers’ “Closer”, The Weeknd’s “Blinding Lights”, Teddy Swims' "Lose Control", Benson Boone's "Beautiful Things", Shaboozey's "A Bar Song (Tipsy)", and Post Malone and Morgan Wallen's "I Had Some Help". The best-selling single in Billboard history, and the only single ever certified Diamond in the United States at the time, the single shipped over 11 million copies in the US. The solo number-one single broke Elton John's "Kiki jinx". After five number-one solo hits in America in the 1970s, John hit number one in a duet with Kiki Dee with 1976's "Don't Go Breaking My Heart". From then until "Candle in the Wind 1997", John did not record a number-one single by himself and only had two chart toppers altogether, collaborating with other artists. "Candle in the Wind 1997" was also the only number-one song in the year-end to be number one the year after. (1997 year-end, and it was number one for the first two weeks of 1998.)

On the Canadian Singles Chart, "Candle in the Wind 1997" / "Something About the Way You Look Tonight" spent three years in the top 20, with 45 non-consecutive weeks at the top spot. However, the song's unusual chart performance in Canada has also been explained as a structural factor, due to the relative lack of CD singles available for sale in Canadian stores. On Canada's RPM Top Singles chart, neither song made it to the top spot, with "Candle" reaching number 14 and "Something" peaking at number 13 and spending a much longer amount of time in the top 20. In Germany, the song is the 8th best selling pop hymn ever. Having spent six weeks at number one on the ARIA Charts, "Candle in the Wind 1997" is one of the all-time best-selling singles in Australia, being certified 14 times platinum with 56 weeks in the Top 100. According to Musiikkituottajat, the Finnish music industry federation, "Candle in the Wind 1997" is the best-selling single of all time in Finland, with quintuple-platinum sales of over 54,000 copies to date.

"Candle in the Wind 1997" had 150,000 preorders in Netherlands, 2 million in Germany and 250,000 in France. In Australia it had 400,000 preorders and in Germany it had 2 million preorders ahead of its 13 September issue. In France the single was released 11 September, and following day it reached a platinum status with 500,000 sales.

It is estimated that at the peak of sales, almost six copies of the single were sold per second. In the UK, the single grabbed the number one slot on the first day of its release, with more than 650,000 copies sold in 24 hours, becoming the fastest-selling record of all time in the UK charts. All artist and composer royalties and record company profits were donated to Diana's charities via the Diana, Princess of Wales Memorial Fund.

=== All-time sales ranking ===
The song has sold over 33 million copies worldwide. Some have pointed out, the sales (of over 30 million) were "shipped"; achieved in about 37 days.

"Candle in the Wind 1997" is either the best-selling or the second best-selling single worldwide of all time. The confusion and debate on whether John's record is or is not the best-selling single in the world is due to a lack of information on sales for the record's main contender for the number-one spot, Bing Crosby's recording of "White Christmas," because Crosby's recording was released before the advent of the modern-day US and UK singles charts. However, after careful research, Guinness World Records in 2007 concluded that, worldwide, Crosby's recording of "White Christmas" has, in their estimation, sold at least 50 million copies, and that John's recording of "Candle in the Wind" has sold 33 million, making Crosby's recording the best-selling single of all time. However, an update in the 2009 edition of the book decided to further help settle the controversy amicably by naming both John's and Crosby's songs to be "winners" by stating that John's recording is the "best-selling single since UK and US singles charts began in the 1950s," while maintaining that "the best-selling single of all time was released before the first pop charts," and that this distinction belongs to "White Christmas," which it says "was listed as the world's best-selling single in the first-ever Guinness Book of Records (published in 1955) and – remarkably – still retains the title more than 50 years later."

== Charts ==
=== Weekly charts ===
Weekly chart performance for "Something About the Way You Look Tonight" / "Candle in the Wind 1997"
Chart (1997–1998)	Peak position
Australia (ARIA)	1
Austria (Ö3 Austria Top 40)	1
Belgium (Ultratop 50 Flanders)	1
Belgium (Ultratop 50 Wallonia)	1
Canada Top Singles (RPM)	14
Canada Adult Contemporary (RPM)	1
Canada (Nielsen SoundScan)	1
Denmark (Hitlisten)	1
Estonia (Eesti Top 20)	7
Europe (Eurochart Hot 100)	1
Finland (Suomen virallinen lista)	1
France (SNEP)	1
Germany (GfK)	1
Hungary (Mahasz)	1
Iceland (Íslenski Listinn Topp 40)	3
Ireland (IRMA)	1
Israel (Israeli Singles Chart)	8
Italy (Musica e dischi)	1
Japan (Oricon)	1
Netherlands (Dutch Top 40)	1
Netherlands (Single Top 100)	1
New Zealand (Recorded Music NZ)	1
Norway (VG-lista)	1
Poland Airplay (Music & Media)	6
Scottish Singles Sales (Official Charts)	1
Spain (AFYVE)	1
Sweden (Sverigetopplistan)	1
Switzerland (Schweizer Hitparade)	1
Taiwan (IFPI)	1
UK Singles (Official Charts)	1
US Billboard Hot 100	1
US Adult Contemporary (Billboard)	2
US Adult Pop Airplay (Billboard)	12
US Pop Airplay (Billboard)	32
Zimbabwe (ZIMA)	1

=== Year-end charts ===
1997 year-end chart performance for "Something About the Way You Look Tonight" / "Candle in the Wind 1997"
Chart (1997)	Position
Australia (ARIA)	1
Austria (Ö3 Austria Top 40)	1
Belgium (Ultratop 50 Flanders)	1
Belgium (Ultratop 50 Wallonia)	1
Brazil (Crowley)	25
Canada Top Singles (RPM)	96
Canada Adult Contemporary (RPM)	11
Europe (Eurochart Hot 100)	1
France (SNEP)	1
Germany (Media Control)	3
Iceland (Íslenski Listinn Topp 40)	38
Israel (Israeli Singles Chart)	20
Netherlands (Dutch Top 40)	19
Netherlands (Single Top 100)	1
New Zealand (RIANZ)	1
Norway (VG-lista)	1
Romania (Romanian Top 100)	40
Sweden (Topplistan)	1
Switzerland (Schweizer Hitparade)	21
UK Singles (OCC)	1
US Billboard Hot 100	1

1998 year-end chart performance for "Something About the Way You Look Tonight" / "Candle in the Wind 1997"
Chart (1998)	Position
Austria (Ö3 Austria Top 40)	9
Europe (Eurochart Hot 100)	31
Germany (Media Control)	91
Sweden (Hitlistan)	41
Switzerland (Schweizer Hitparade)	28
US Billboard Hot 100	8

=== Decade-end charts ===
Decade-end chart performance for "Something About the Way You Look Tonight" / "Candle in the Wind 1997"
Chart (1990–1999)	Position
Austria (Ö3 Austria Top 40)	15
Belgium (Ultratop Flanders)	1
Canada (Nielsen SoundScan)	1
Netherlands (Dutch Top 40)	91
US Billboard Hot 100	5

=== All-time charts ===
All-time chart performance for "Something About the Way You Look Tonight" / "Candle in the Wind 1997"
Chart	Position
Belgium (Ultratop 50 Flanders)	1
Ireland (IRMA)	1
UK Singles (OCC)	1
US Billboard Hot 100	52

== Certifications and sales ==
Certifications and sales for "Something About the Way You Look Tonight" / "Candle in the Wind 1997"
Region	Certification	Certified units/sales
Australia (ARIA)	14× Platinum	980,000^{^}
Austria (IFPI Austria)	6× Platinum	300,000^{*}
Belgium (BRMA)	9× Platinum	450,000^{*}
Brazil (Pro-Música Brasil)	Platinum	60,000^{*}
Canada (Music Canada)	19× Platinum	1,900,000^{^}
Czech Republic (IFPI Czech)	7× Platinum	28,000
Finland (Musiikkituottajat)	Platinum	54,225
France (SNEP)	Diamond	2,000,000
Germany (BVMI)	9× Platinum	4,500,000^{^}
Italy	—	300,000
Japan (RIAJ)	2× Platinum	800,000
Netherlands (NVPI)	6× Platinum	600,000
Norway (IFPI Norway)	8× Platinum	182,000
Poland (ZPAV)	Platinum	20,000^{*}
Spain (Promusicae)	4× Platinum	200,000^{^}
Sweden (GLF)	7× Platinum	210,000^{^}
Switzerland (IFPI Switzerland)	9× Platinum	450,000^{^}
United Kingdom (BPI)	9× Platinum	5,400,000^{^}
United States (RIAA)	11× Platinum	11,000,000^{^}
Summaries
Worldwide	—	33,000,000
^{*} Sales figures based on certification alone.^{^} Shipments figures based on certification alone.

== Cover versions ==
In 1997 La Bouche covered "Candle in the Wind 1997" as a bonus track on their album A Moment of Love.

== See also ==
- Diana, Princess of Wales Memorial Fund
- List of best-selling singles
- List of best-selling singles in Australia
- List of best-selling singles in Canada
- List of best-selling singles in Finland
- List of best-selling singles in France
- List of best-selling singles in Germany
- List of best-selling singles in Japan
- List of best-selling singles in Spain
- List of best-selling singles in the United Kingdom
- List of best-selling singles in the United States
- List of Billboard Adult Contemporary number ones of 1997
