= I Don't Wanna Go On with You Like That =

1988 single by Elton John

Single by Elton John

from the album Reg Strikes Back
- B-side: "Rope Around a Fool"
- Released: 1988
- Genre: Dance
- Length: 4:33 (album version); 3:58 (single version)
- Label: Rocket; MCA
- Composer: Elton John
- Lyricist: Bernie Taupin
- Producer: Chris Thomas

Elton John singles chronology
"Take Me to the Pilot" (1988)	"I Don't Wanna Go On with You Like That" (1988)	"Town of Plenty" (1988)

"I Don't Wanna Go On with You Like That" is a song by British musician Elton John and lyricist Bernie Taupin, performed by John. It is from his twenty-first studio album, Reg Strikes Back (1988), and was released as its lead single by Rocket and MCA Records. Upon its release in 1988, the song peaked at number two on the US Billboard Hot 100 in August 1988, becoming John's highest-charting hit of the 1980s in the US. The song also became John's eighth number-one on the Billboard Adult Contemporary chart. In Canada, the single peaked atop the RPM 100 Singles chart for three weeks, giving John his 13th chart-topper there. It became a top-10 hit in Austria and Switzerland, and a top-40 hit in nine countries including the UK, where it reached at number 30 on the UK singles chart.

== Critical reception ==
American magazine Cash Box called "I Don't Wanna Go On with You Like That" "a straight-ahead dance/rocker that gets on a forward track and stays there" with "biting lyrics." Robin Smith from Record Mirror felt that John is "right on target" with the classic rock of the song. Richard Lowe from Smash Hits wrote, "His new tune's not much cop though. It's a lacklustre ditty that he probably knocked out one lazy afternoon and its only saving grace is the rather extraordinary popping noise that runs all the way through. Must be one of these new-fangled electric drums. Quite odd." Jerry Smith of Music Week considered the song a "totally irresistible and thumpingly energic track".

== Live performances ==
When John played this song with the band on his concerts, the intro had different arrangements as he regularly played it in his tours during the album tour, Sleeping with the Past Tour and the rest of 1990s before he retired it in 2000 as the One Night Only concert in Madison Square Garden remains the most recent performance of it.

== Other versions ==
A 12-inch extended remix of the song by Shep Pettibone was released on vinyl during the song's initial release period. This remix appears on the CD box set compilation, To Be Continued..., released in 1990. The Just Elton and His Piano mix of the song is also available (on the reissued 1998 version of the Reg Strikes Back album).

== Track listings ==
- 7-inch single
1. "I Don't Wanna Go On with You Like That" – 4:32
2. "Rope Around a Fool" – 3:46
- 12-inch maxi
1. "I Don't Wanna Go On with You Like That" (Shep Pettibone 12-inch Mix) – 7:20
2. "I Don't Wanna Go On with You Like That" – 4:32
3. "Rope Around a Fool" – 3:46
- CD maxi
1. "I Don't Wanna Go On with You Like That" – 4:33
2. "Rope Around a Fool" – 3:48
3. "I Don't Wanna Go On with You Like That" (Shep Pettibone 12-inch Mix) – 7:16

== Personnel ==
- Elton John – Roland RD-1000 digital piano, lead and harmony vocals
- Fred Mandel – synthesizers
- Davey Johnstone – acoustic guitar, backing vocals
- David Paton – bass
- Charlie Morgan – drums
- Dee Murray – backing vocals
- Nigel Olsson – backing vocals

== Charts ==
=== Weekly charts ===
Chart (1988)	Peak position
Australia (ARIA)	24
Austria (Ö3 Austria Top 40)	6
Canada Retail Singles (The Record)	1
Canada Top Singles (RPM)	1
Canada Adult Contemporary (RPM)	2
Europe (Eurochart Hot 100)	30
Finland (Suomen virallinen lista)	28
France (SNEP)	19
Ireland (IRMA)	25
Italy Airplay (Music & Media)	1
New Zealand (Recorded Music NZ)	21
South Africa (Springbok Radio)	27
Switzerland (Schweizer Hitparade)	10
UK Singles (Official Charts)	30
US Billboard Hot 100	2
US Adult Contemporary (Billboard)	1
US Dance Club Songs (Billboard)	7
US Dance Singles Sales (Billboard)	15
US Mainstream Rock (Billboard)	13
West Germany (GfK)	22

=== Year-end charts ===
Chart (1988)	Position
Austria (Ö3 Austria Top 40)	26
Brazil (Crowley)	59
Canada Top Singles (RPM)	22
Europe (Eurochart Hot 100)	79
US Billboard Hot 100	43
US Adult Contemporary (Billboard)	9
West Germany (Media Control)	72
