= Believe (Elton John song) =

1995 single by Elton John

Single by Elton John

from the album Made in England
- B-side: "Sorry Seems to Be the Hardest Word" (live); "The One" (live)
- Released: 20 February 1995
- Length: 4:51
- Label: Rocket; Mercury
- Composer: Elton John
- Lyricist: Bernie Taupin
- Producers: Greg Penny; Elton John

Elton John singles chronology
"Circle of Life" (1994)	"Believe" (1995)	"Made in England" (1995)

Music video
- "Believe" on YouTube

"Believe" is a song by British musician Elton John and lyricist Bernie Taupin, performed by John. It was the first single from his 24th studio album, Made in England (1995), and was released on 20 February 1995. Several versions of the single were released, featuring B-sides such as "Circle of Life" from The Lion King and live versions of tracks including "The One," "The Last Song," "Sorry Seems to Be the Hardest Word," and "Believe," which were recorded at the Greek Theatre in Los Angeles.

"Believe" reached number one in Iceland, Italy and Canada, becoming John's 18th number-one single in the latter country. In the United States, "Believe" became John's 15th number one on the Billboard Adult Contemporary chart and peaked at number 13 on the Billboard Hot 100; it gave him a third straight top-20 single in the US. In Europe, it was a top-20 hit in Finland, France, Switzerland, the United Kingdom, and Wallonia. The accompanying music video for the song, directed by Marcus Nispel, was entirely in black-and-white and shot in London.

== Critical reception ==
Dave Sholin from the Gavin Report wrote, "Elton John debuts his resurrected Rocket label with a ballad as compelling as any he's ever recorded. Go directly to the air studio, place in deck, hit play. End of story." Chuck Campbell from Knoxville News Sentinel viewed it as a "plodding single," saying, "This is the formula stuff John's been getting away with for years." Music Week gave the song four out of five, describing it as "a fab, pompous and brooding 'I believe in love' stomper. Thankfully, he's ditched the frothy pop for a quite majestic song that would no doubt get an approving nod from a certain Freddie Mercury." Music Week editor Alan Jones felt the song "is clearly destined to be massive. The big ballad, cleverly marketed over two CD singles, augers well for his upcoming album Made in England."

Pan-European magazine Music & Media named 'Believe' a "grand ballad". Paul Moody from NME wrote that the "belting comeback single" "is probably the best thing Elt's come up with since his last career revival in the mid-'80s, being a booming epic not dissimilar in mood to Duran's marvellous 'Ordinary World'." A reviewer from People Magazine described it as "a power ballad that hints at John Lennon during his pop-obsessed Double Fantasy era." Also Tony Cross from Smash Hits gave 'Believe' four out of five, writing that "it's a rock opera of Freddy [sic] Mercury proportions that proves the wee wiggy grandpa can keep coming up with the goods. Everything crumbles for love... he croons above the usual helpings of slush, violins, that piano and those specs... It proves Elton's still got the ability to hit where it hurts the most — in the heart." Another Smash Hits editor, Mark Sutherland, named it a "superior smoocher".

== Music video ==
In the accompanying black-and-white music video for "Believe" directed by German film director and producer Marcus Nispel, Elton John travels around the world in a Zeppelin. Some behind the scenes footage of the video was used for the 1997 documentary Elton John: Tantrums & Tiaras.

== Accolades ==
Year	Nominee / work	Award	Result
1996	"Believe"	Grammy Award for Best Male Pop Vocal Performance	Nominated

== Track listings ==
- 7-inch
1. "Believe" – 4:51
2. "The One" (live) – 6:32
- Europe CD maxi
1. "Believe" – 4:51
2. "Believe" (live) – 4:43
3. "Sorry Seems to Be the Hardest Word" (live) – 3:52
- US CD maxi
1. "Believe" – 4:51
2. "The One" (live) – 6:32
3. "Believe" (live) – 4:43

== Personnel ==
- Elton John – vocals, acoustic piano, keyboards
- Guy Babylon – keyboards, programming
- Davey Johnstone – guitars
- Bob Birch – bass
- Charlie Morgan – drums
- Ray Cooper – percussion
- Paul Buckmaster – orchestra arrangements and conductor
- The London Session Orchestra – strings

== Charts ==
=== Weekly charts ===
Chart (1995)	Peak position
Australia (ARIA)	23
Austria (Ö3 Austria Top 40)	21
Belgium (Ultratop 50 Flanders)	38
Belgium (Ultratop 50 Wallonia)	8
Canada Retail Singles (The Record)	2
Canada Top Singles (RPM)	1
Canada Adult Contemporary (RPM)	1
Europe (Eurochart Hot 100)	18
Europe (European Hit Radio)	3
Finland (Suomen virallinen lista)	19
France (SNEP)	13
Germany (GfK)	56
Iceland (Íslenski Listinn Topp 40)	1
Ireland (IRMA)	24
Israel (Israeli Singles Chart)	7
Italy (Musica e dischi)	1
Italy Airplay (Music & Media)	4
Netherlands (Dutch Top 40 Tipparade)	6
Netherlands (Single Top 100)	47
New Zealand (Recorded Music NZ)	43
Scottish Singles Sales (Official Charts)	17
Sweden (Sverigetopplistan)	25
Switzerland (Schweizer Hitparade)	20
UK Singles (Official Charts)	15
US Billboard Hot 100	13
US Adult Contemporary (Billboard)	1
US Adult Pop Airplay (Billboard)	31
US Pop Airplay (Billboard)	21
US Cash Box Top 100	11

=== Year-end charts ===
Chart (1995)	Position
Canada Top Singles (RPM)	9
Canada Adult Contemporary (RPM)	2
Europe (European Hit Radio)	24
France (SNEP)	73
Iceland (Íslenski Listinn Topp 40)	6
Latvia (Latvijas Top 50)	70
US Billboard Hot 100	59
US Adult Contemporary (Billboard)	11
US Cash Box Top 100	50

== Release history ==
Region	Date	Format(s)	Label(s)	Ref.
United Kingdom	20 February 1995	CD1; cassette	Rocket; Mercury	
Japan	25 February 1995	CD	Rocket; Mercury	
Australia	27 February 1995	CD; cassette	Rocket; Mercury	
United Kingdom	27 February 1995	CD2	Rocket; Mercury	
United States	27 February 1995	Commercial	Rocket; Island	
