= You Can Make History (Young Again) =

Single by Elton John

from the album Love Songs
- B-side: "Song for Guy"
- Released: October 1996
- Recorded: 1996
- Genre: Pop; soft rock
- Length: 3:52 (radio edit); 4:54 (album version)
- Label: MCA
- Songwriters: Elton John; Bernie Taupin
- Producer: Chris Thomas

Elton John singles chronology
"Please" (1996)	"You Can Make History (Young Again)" (1996)	"Live Like Horses" (1996)

Music video
- "You Can Make History (Young Again)" on YouTube

"You Can Make History (Young Again)" is a song by British musician Elton John and lyricist Bernie Taupin, performed by John. It was initially recorded in 1996 and released on the American version of the compilation Love Songs. As the song was recorded after the release of the original European version of the compilation (released in late 1995), it was not included on that version.

Lyrically, the song talks of a lover who makes one feel young again, and is said to have been written about David Furnish, with whom John began a relationship in 1993. The single included two tracks: a version of the song with its characteristic sitar (which can be heard at the beginning and end of the song), and one without (effectively an acoustic mix).

== Release ==
The song was released as a cassette single, charting at number four on the Billboard Adult Contemporary chart and number 70 on the main Hot 100 chart. It also reached number 19 in Canada.

Approximately a year after its release, the song was first released internationally when it was included as the B-side of the worldwide number-one "Something About the Way You Look Tonight"/"Candle in the Wind 1997" single, both of which were dedicated to John's friends who had died that year: Gianni Versace and Diana, Princess of Wales respectively.

== Critical reception ==
Larry Flick from Billboard magazine wrote, "As the legendary tunesmith's more recent material goes, this is among his strongest efforts in years, with its softly shuffling rhythms, caressing strings, and cozy words. Longtime fans may occasionally wince at its sugary content, but this ultimately appealing and memorable single is perfectly suited to the current top 40 and AC radio climate. In fact, this bit of "history" will wash over both formats like a cool, refreshing breeze. Proof that context is everything."

== Live performances ==
John only played this song two times live on one day. He performed the song on 15 November 1996 on The Rosie O'Donnell Show and Late Night with Conan O'Brien.

== Music video ==
A music video, essentially a tribute to John's career, was also filmed for the song, featuring John singing in front of a microphone in a room with striped walls. Intercut with this are scenes of the camera panning across and zooming in and out of photographs and video footage (projected within the photo frames), showing various performances and notable events from throughout John's career. Lying amongst these photographs are notable John accessories, such as a knee-high boot adorned with stars, sunglasses with purple lenses, and various top hats.

Towards the end of the video, several of the frames catch fire, and remain charred as smoke rises out of the box first seen at the beginning. One final frame shows John with his back towards the camera as he bows.

== Track listing ==
- Promo CD
1. "You Can Make History (Young Again)" (without sitar) – 4:54
2. "You Can Make History (Young Again)" (with sitar) – 4:54
- Cassette
1. "You Can Make History (Young Again)" – 4:54
2. "Song for Guy" – 5:02

== Personnel ==
- Elton John – piano, vocals
- Davey Johnstone – guitars
- Bob Birch – bass guitar
- Charlie Morgan – drums, percussion
- Guy Babylon – keyboards

== Charts ==
=== Weekly charts ===
Weekly chart performance for "You Can Make History (Young Again)"
Chart (1996–1997)	Peak position
Canada Top Singles (RPM)	19
Canada Adult Contemporary (RPM)	18
Estonia (Eesti Top 20)	19
US Billboard Hot 100	70
US Adult Contemporary (Billboard)	4
US Cash Box Top 100	66

=== Year-end charts ===
Year-end chart performance for "You Can Make History (Young Again)"
Chart (1996)	Rank
Canada Adult Contemporary (RPM)	53
