= Live Like Horses =

Single by Elton John & Luciano Pavarotti

from the album The Big Picture
- Released: 2 December 1996
- Studio: Townhouse Studios (London, England) (solo version)
- Genre: Pop; operatic pop
- Length: 5:02
- Label: Mercury; Rocket
- Songwriters: Elton John; Bernie Taupin
- Producer: Chris Thomas

Elton John singles chronology
"You Can Make History (Young Again)" (1996)	"Live Like Horses" (1996)	"Something About the Way You Look Tonight" / "Candle in the Wind 1997" (1997)

"Live Like Horses" is a song written by British musician Elton John and lyricist Bernie Taupin, performed by John. It was included on John's 1997 album The Big Picture. The album version is sung as a solo by John and the single version, released in 1996, features Italian operatic tenor Luciano Pavarotti singing in his native language on parts of the verses and choruses alternatively with John. The single reached number nine in the UK singles chart.

== Music video ==
The video, shot in black and white, was directed by Federico Brugia and produced by Nick Verden for Stark Naked Films. It was filmed in Austria and Shepperton Studios in England and features both John and Pavarotti singing their parts.

== Track listings ==
Europe CD 1

1. "Live Like Horses" (studio version) – 5:10
2. "Live Like Horses" (Live Finale version) – 5:03
3. "I Guess That's Why They Call It The Blues" (live) – 4:42
4. "Live Like Horses" (Elton John solo studio version)

Europe CD 2

1. "Live Like Horses" (studio version)
2. "Live Like Horses" (Live Finale version)
3. "Step into Christmas"
4. "Blessed"

== Personnel ==
- Elton John – piano and vocals
- Luciano Pavarotti – vocals (on the single version of this song)
- Davey Johnstone – guitar
- John Jorgenson – guitar
- Bob Birch – bass
- Guy Babylon – keyboards
- Charlie Morgan – drums and percussion
- Angel Voices Choir – backing vocals

== Charts ==
Chart (1996)	Peak position
Belgium Singles Chart (Ultratop)	65
Dutch Singles Chart	74
UK Singles Chart	9
