= Reg Strikes Back =

Studio album by Elton John
- Released: 20 June 1988
- Recorded: 1987–88
- Studios: AIR Studios and Westside Studios (London, England, UK); Circle Seven Recording and Record Plant (Los Angeles, California, USA)
- Genres: Pop, rock
- Length: 42:04
- Labels: MCA (US); Rocket (UK)
- Producer: Chris Thomas

Elton John chronology
Elton John's Greatest Hits Vol. 3 (1987)	Reg Strikes Back (1988)	Sleeping with the Past (1989)

Singles from Reg Strikes Back
- 1. "I Don't Wanna Go On with You Like That" Released: May 1988; 2. "Town of Plenty" Released: 22 August 1988; 3. "A Word in Spanish" Released: 28 November 1988; 4. "Mona Lisas and Mad Hatters (Part Two) (remix)" Released: November 1988 (US)

Professional ratings
Review scores
Source	Rating
AllMusic	2/5 stars
Chicago Tribune	(mixed)
The Encyclopedia of Popular Music	3/5 stars
Los Angeles Times	3/4 stars
The New York Times	(unfavourable)
Record Mirror	4/5 stars
Rolling Stone	3/5 stars

Reg Strikes Back is the twenty-first studio album by the British musician Elton John, released in 1988. It was his self-proclaimed comeback album, and his own way of fighting back against bad press. The "Reg" in Reg Strikes Back refers to John's birth name, Reginald Kenneth Dwight.

In the US, the album was certified gold in August 1988 by the RIAA. It was also John's third studio album in the 1980s to be placed inside the top 20 of US Billboard 200 (number 16, 1988).

== Background ==
This was the last album that bassist Dee Murray (albeit without bass) appeared on prior to his death in 1992, providing backing vocals. Additionally, Nigel Olsson, the longtime drummer for the Elton John Band, appears (without drums) on backing vocals. Elton John brought back record producer Chris Thomas for the album. The track "Heavy Traffic" had been written during the sessions for John's previous album Leather Jackets. This was the first studio album to be recorded and released after John's throat surgery the previous year. The album cover featured costumes from John's collection that he decided to put up for auction.

The tracks "I Don't Wanna Go On with You Like That" and "A Word in Spanish" peaked at No. 2 and No. 19 on the Billboard Hot 100, respectively.

On the UK singles chart, "I Don't Wanna Go On with You Like That" was the only song from the album to reach the Top 40 there, reaching #30 as the follow-up "Town of Plenty" and "A Word in Spanish" appears outside the Top 40 on the same chart, peaking at #74 and #91. The latter was the 92nd best-performing song of 1988 on the Tokio Hot 100.

Cash Box said that "A Word in Spanish" is "brilliant," describing it as "a Spanish-guitar tinged ballad written with the kind of originality that John-Taupin haven't really touched since the seventies."

== Tour ==
After taking over a year off (to recover from throat surgery, address personal issues and record Reg Strikes Back in London), John returned to the stage with a new rhythm section. He wanted more of an R&B sound to his material, so drummer Jonathan Moffett and bassist Romeo Williams, along with backing singers Marlena Jeter, Natalie Jackson and Alex Brown, were added to the band. Guitarist Davey Johnstone, now also in the role of music director, had assembled the new band, a task that he continues to do.

The band's first show was at an AIDS benefit at the Century Plaza Hotel in Los Angeles, where they played a 14-song set that featured the never-released John/Taupin composition, "Love Is Worth Waiting For". The US tour then began on 9 September at the Miami Arena in Miami, Florida and concluded on 22 October at New York's Madison Square Garden.

After recording the follow-up album Sleeping with the Past in Denmark, the band (now with backing vocalist Mortonette Jenkins instead of Alex Brown) resumed their tour on 20 March 1989 at La Halle Tony Garnier in Lyon, France, and played across Eastern Europe and the UK, concluding on 10 June 1989 at the RDS Arena in Dublin.

== Track listing ==
All tracks are written by Elton John and Bernie Taupin, except where noted.

Side one
No.	Title	Length
1.	"Town of Plenty"	3:40
2.	"A Word in Spanish"	4:39
3.	"Mona Lisas and Mad Hatters (Part Two)"	4:12
4.	"I Don't Wanna Go On with You Like That"	4:33
5.	"Japanese Hands"	4:40

Side two
No.	Title	Length
1.	"Goodbye Marlon Brando"	3:30
2.	"The Camera Never Lies"	4:36
3.	"Heavy Traffic" (John, Taupin, Davey Johnstone)	3:30
4.	"Poor Cow"	3:50
5.	"Since God Invented Girls"	4:54
Total length:		42:06

Bonus tracks (1998 PolyGram International reissue)
No.	Title	Length
11.	"Rope Around a Fool"	3:48
12.	"I Don't Wanna Go On with You Like That" (Shep Pettibone Mix)	7:16
13.	"I Don't Wanna Go On with You Like That" (Just Elton and His Piano Mix)	4:37
14.	"Mona Lisas and Mad Hatters (Part Two)" (The Renaissance Mix)	6:19
Total length:		64:06

== Personnel ==
=== Musicians ===
Track numbering refers to CD and digital releases of the album.

- Elton John – lead vocals, harmonies, backing vocals, keyboards, additional backing vocals (10)
- Fred Mandel – synthesizers
- Davey Johnstone – guitars, backing vocals
- Pete Townshend – acoustic guitar (1)
- David Paton – bass
- Charlie Morgan – drums
- Ray Cooper – three-set percussion (maracas, tambourine and timbales) (6–9)
- Freddie Hubbard – trumpet and flugelhorn (3)
- Dee Murray – backing vocals
- Nigel Olsson – backing vocals
- Adrian Baker – additional backing vocals (10)
- Bruce Johnston – additional backing vocals (10)
- Carl Wilson – additional backing vocals (10)

=== Production ===
- Chris Thomas – producer
- Bill Price – recording, mixing
- Karl Lever – recording assistant
- Michael Mason – additional engineer
- Paul Wertheimer – additional engineer, second engineer
- Tim Young – mastering at CBS Studios (London, UK)
- David Costa – art direction
- Gered Mankowitz – photography
- Bob Stacey – wardrobe
- Steve Brown – management
- John Reid – management
- All songs published by Happenstance Ltd.

1998 reissue

- Mike Gill – supervising producer
- Shep Pettibone – additional production (12–14), remixing (12–14)
- Steve Peck – additional remixing (12, 13)
- Daniel Abraham – remixing (14)
- Junior Vasquez – editing (12, 13)
- Gus Dudgeon – remastering
- Peter Mew – remastering
- Abbey Road Studios (London, UK) – remastering location
- Mike Storey – graphics
- Andy Simmons – liner notes

== Charts ==
=== Weekly charts ===
Weekly chart performance for Reg Strikes Back
Chart (1988–1989)	Peak position
Australian Albums (ARIA)	13
Austrian Albums (Ö3 Austria)	13
Canada Top Albums/CDs (RPM)	6
Danish Albums (Hitlisten)	13
Dutch Albums (Album Top 100)	13
French Albums (SNEP)	30
German Albums (Offizielle Top 100)	18
Italian Albums (Musica e Dischi)	3
New Zealand Albums (RMNZ)	26
Norwegian Albums (VG-lista)	8
Swedish Albums (Sverigetopplistan)	16
Swiss Albums (Schweizer Hitparade)	5
UK Albums (Official Charts)	18
US Billboard 200	16

=== Year-end charts ===
1988 year-end chart performance for Reg Strikes Back
Chart (1988)	Position
Australian Albums (Kent Music Report)	60
US Billboard 200	65

1989 year-end chart performance for Reg Strikes Back
Chart (1989)	Position
French Albums (SNEP)	93

== Certifications and sales ==
Region	Certification	Certified units/sales
Australia (ARIA)	Gold	35,000^{^}
Canada (Music Canada)	2× Platinum	200,000^{^}
France (SNEP)	Gold	100,000^{*}
Italy sales 1988-1989	—	500,000
Spain	—	25,000
Switzerland (IFPI Switzerland)	Gold	25,000^{^}
United Kingdom (BPI)	Silver	60,000^{^}
United States (RIAA)	Gold	500,000^{^}
^{*} Sales figures based on certification alone.^{^} Shipments figures based on certification alone.
