= Made in England (song) =

1995 single by Elton John

Single by Elton John

from the album Made in England
- B-side: "Whatever Gets You Through the Night" (live); "Lucy in the Sky with Diamonds" (live); "I Saw Her Standing There" (live)
- Released: 8 May 1995
- Genre: Pop rock
- Length: 4:46 (single version); 5:08 (album version)
- Label: Rocket; Mercury
- Composer: Elton John
- Lyricist: Bernie Taupin
- Producers: Greg Penny; Elton John

Elton John singles chronology
"Believe" (1995)	"Made in England" (1995)	"Blessed" (1995)

Music video
- "Made in England" on YouTube

"Made in England" is a song by British musician Elton John and lyricist Bernie Taupin, performed by John. It was released in May 1995 by Rocket and Mercury Records as the title track and second single from John's 24th studio album, Made in England. It is an autobiographical telling of his growing up, parts of his life, and what life is like in England. The song peaked at number 18 on the UK singles chart and number five on the Canadian RPM 100 Hit Tracks chart, topping the RPM Adult Contemporary chart for one week. In the United States, the song peaked at numbers 52 and 58 on the Billboard Hot 100 and Cash Box Top 100, and number 12 on the Billboard Adult Contemporary chart. The accompanying music video was directed by Howard Greenhalgh.

== Critical reception ==
Upon its release, the title track received general positive reviews from critics. J. D. Considine from The Baltimore Sun noted its "irrepressible uplift." Chuck Campbell from Knoxville News Sentinel named it a highlight of the album, describing it as "a surprisingly catchy up-tempo pop/rock ditty." In his weekly UK chart commentary, James Masterton stated that the second single from the album of same name "in so many ways is a much better single. Forget all these mushy ballads about divorce and middle-age he has been churning out recently, posterity will record that Elton John is the master of the out-and-out pop stormer – and this song, both a homage to this wonderful country and yet at the same time a protest against homophobia is possibly one of the best records he has made for several years."

Pan-European magazine Music & Media wrote, "In the past the inscription was found on the back of a Matchbox or a Dinky Toy. Elton puts it differently by singing he was made in England like the Cortina. Who cares, all these cars roll. But what's more, the song rocks too!" That aspect also instantly struck Norwegian Radio 102/Haugesund head of music Egil Houeland. He said, "After a whole string of ballads it's interesting to see Elton return with a solid uptempo rocker. He can still do it." Paul Moody from NME felt the "decidedly frisky title track has the same self-righteous fizz of 'I'm Still Standing' right down to the immortal line, I got a bloody nose/For rock'n'roll." People Magazine described it as "a prototypical Elton rocker that should echo nicely off the concrete walls in the stadiums he’ll play in this summer." Mark Sutherland from Smash Hits viewed it as "something jaunty".

== Music video ==
A music video was produced to promote the single, directed by British director Howard Greenhalgh. A "live" performance of the song was filmed in the Ballroom of the British Ambassador's residence in Paris for broadcast on the BBC's Top of the Pops. As John's schedule could not accommodate a trip to England at the time, the Embassy property was deemed the next best thing.

== Personnel ==
- Elton John – vocals, acoustic piano, keyboards
- Guy Babylon – keyboards, programming
- Davey Johnstone – guitars
- Bob Birch – bass
- Charlie Morgan – drums
- Ray Cooper – percussion

== Charts ==
=== Weekly charts ===
Chart (1995)	Peak position
Australia (ARIA)	48
Canada Top Singles (RPM)	5
Canada Adult Contemporary (RPM)	1
Europe (Eurochart Hot 100)	74
Europe (European Hit Radio)	5
Germany (GfK)	59
Hungary (Mahasz)	10
Iceland (Íslenski Listinn Topp 40)	17
Norway (VG-lista)	20
Scottish Singles Sales (Official Charts)	19
Switzerland (Schweizer Hitparade)	40
UK Singles (Official Charts)	18
UK Airplay (Music Week)	3
US Billboard Hot 100	52
US Adult Contemporary (Billboard)	12
US Dance Club Songs (Billboard)	13
US Dance Singles Sales (Billboard)	29
US Pop Airplay (Billboard)	39
US Cash Box Top 100	58

=== Year-end charts ===
Chart (1995)	Position
Canada Top Singles (RPM)	40
Canada Adult Contemporary (RPM)	6
Europe (European Hit Radio)	23

== Release history ==
Region	Date	Format(s)	Label(s)	Ref.
United Kingdom	8 May 1995	CD1; cassette	Rocket; Mercury	
United Kingdom	15 May 1995	CD2	Rocket; Mercury	
Australia	29 May 1995	CD1; cassette	Rocket; Mercury	
Japan	10 June 1995	CD	Rocket; Mercury	
Australia	19 June 1995	CD2	Rocket; Mercury	
United States	20 June 1995	Contemporary hit radio	Rocket; Island	
