= Classic Elton John =

Greatest hits album by Elton John
- Released: 1994
- Genre: Rock
- Length: 52:19
- Label: PolyGram

Classic Elton John is a compilation of Elton John tracks released by PolyGram Special Markets in 1994. It was available as a CD or cassette only from McDonald's as a promotion to raise money for the Ronald McDonald House Charities.

== Track listing ==
All lyrics are written by Bernie Taupin; all music is composed by Elton John

| No. | Title | Album | Length |
|---|---|---|---|
| 1. | "Take Me to the Pilot" | Elton John (1970) | 3:47 |
| 2. | "Burn Down the Mission" | Tumbleweed Connection (1970) | 6:21 |
| 3. | "Friends" | Friends (1971) | 2:20 |
| 4. | "Saturday Night's Alright for Fighting" | Goodbye Yellow Brick Road (1973) | 4:57 |
| 5. | "Madman Across the Water" | Rare Masters (1992) | 8:50 |
| 6. | "Tiny Dancer" | Madman Across the Water (1971) | 6:12 |
| 7. | "Honky Cat" | Honky Château (1972) | 5:13 |
| 8. | "Crocodile Rock" | Don't Shoot Me I'm Only the Piano Player (1973) | 3:58 |
| 9. | "Mona Lisas and Mad Hatters" | Honky Château (1972) | 5:00 |
| 10. | "Levon" | Madman Across the Water (1971) | 5:22 |
