= Elton 60 – Live at Madison Square Garden =

Video by Elton John
- Released: 2 October 2007
- Recorded: 25 March 2007 at Madison Square Garden, New York City (Disc One); 1970–2006, various (Disc Two)
- Genre: Pop, rock
- Label: Mercury
- Director: David Mallet

Elton 60 – Live at Madison Square Garden is a 2-disc DVD release, starring Elton John performing some of his biggest hits and several fan favourites. The release features appearances by comedians Robin Williams and Whoopi Goldberg, as well as special remarks to the audience by lyricist Bernie Taupin. The concert was recorded on John's 60th birthday, 25 March 2007, and coincides with his record-setting 60th concert at Madison Square Garden in New York City.

In addition to his regular band, The Brooklyn Youth Chorus also performs on several songs.

== DVD releases ==
Originally scheduled to be released to DVD in stores on 25 September 2007, it was postponed until 2 October 2007. A 2-DVD and 1-CD box set with the live CD was released on 9 October 2007.

== Track listing ==
=== Disc One: The Concert ===
1. "Sixty Years On" (Elton John, 1970)
2. "Madman Across the Water" (Madman Across The Water, 1971)
3. "Where to Now St. Peter?" (Tumbleweed Connection, 1970)
4. "Hercules" (Honky Château, 1972)
5. "Ballad of a Well-Known Gun" (Tumbleweed Connection, 1970)
6. "Take Me to the Pilot" (Elton John, 1970)
7. "High Flying Bird" (Don't Shoot Me I'm Only the Piano Player, 1973)
8. "Holiday Inn" (Madman Across the Water, 1971)
9. "Burn Down The Mission" (Tumbleweed Connection, 1970)
10. "Better Off Dead" (Captain Fantastic and the Brown Dirt Cowboy, 1975)
11. "Levon" (Madman Across the Water, 1971)
12. "Empty Garden (Hey Hey Johnny)" (Jump Up, 1982)
13. "Daniel" (Don't Shoot Me I'm Only the Piano Player, 1973)
14. "Honky Cat" (Honky Château, 1972)
15. "Rocket Man" (Honky Château, 1972)
16. "I Guess That's Why They Call It The Blues" (Too Low for Zero, 1983)
17. "The Bridge" (The Captain & the Kid, 2006)
18. "Roy Rogers" (Goodbye Yellow Brick Road, 1973)
19. "Mona Lisas and Mad Hatters" (Honky Château, 1972)
20. "Sorry Seems To Be The Hardest Word" (Blue Moves, 1976)
21. "Bennie and the Jets" (Goodbye Yellow Brick Road, 1973)
22. "All the Girls Love Alice" (Goodbye Yellow Brick Road, 1973)
23. "Tiny Dancer" (Madman Across the Water, 1971)
24. "Something About The Way You Look Tonight" (The Big Picture, 1997)
25. "Philadelphia Freedom" (Rock of the Westies, 1975)
26. "Sad Songs (Say So Much)" (Breaking Hearts, 1984)
27. "Don't Let The Sun Go Down on Me" (Caribou, 1974)
28. "I'm Still Standing" (Two Low for Zero, 1983)
29. "The Bitch Is Back" (Caribou, 1974)
30. "Crocodile Rock" (Don't Shoot Me I'm Only the Piano Player, 1973)
31. "Saturday Night's Alright For Fighting" (Goodbye Yellow Brick Road, 1973)

Encore:

1. "Funeral for a Friend/Love Lies Bleeding" (Goodbye Yellow Brick Road, 1973)
2. "Your Song" (Elton John, 1970)

=== Disc Two ===
Live, Rare & Unseen

1. "Your Song" (Elton at 50 Montage)
2. "Border Song" (Swiss TV, 1970)
3. "Sixty Years On" (In Concert, 1970)
4. "Tiny Dancer" (Sounds for Saturday, 1971)
5. "Levon" (Sounds for Saturday, 1971)
6. "Honky Cat" (Royal Festival Hall, 1972)
7. "Rocket Man" (Royal Festival Hall, 1972)
8. "Crocodile Rock" (Royal Variety Show, 1972)
9. "Goodbye Yellow Brick Road" (Top of the Pops, 1973, lip-synched)
10. "Daniel" (Edinburgh Playhouse Theatre, 1976)
11. "Someone Saved My Life Tonight" (Edinburgh Playhouse Theatre, 1976)
12. "Candle in the Wind" (Edinburgh Playhouse Theatre, 1976)
13. "Sorry Seems to Be the Hardest Word" (Edinburgh Playhouse Theatre, 1976)
14. "I'm Still Standing" (Night & Day Concert, Wembley, 1984)
15. "Bennie and the Jets" (Night & Day Concert, Wembley, 1984)
16. "Song for Guy" (Thank You Australia Concert, 1984)
17. "This Train Don't Stop There Anymore" (Top of the Pops, 2001)
18. "Tinderbox" (BBC In Session, St. Luke's, 2006 – outtake)
19. "The Bridge" (a portion of the studio version)

Elton's New York Stories

1. "Mona Lisas and Mad Hatters" (Royal Festival Hall, 1972)
2. "Wouldn't Have You Any Other Way (NYC)" (BBC In Session, St. Luke's, 2006 – outtake)
3. "Empty Garden (Hey Hey Johnny)" (Hammersmith Odeon, 1982)
4. "Believe" (Madison Square Garden, 1995)
5. "We All Fall in Love Sometimes/Curtains" (Madison Square Garden, 2005)

=== Bonus CD (box set only) ===
1. "Sixty Years On"
2. "Ballad of a Well-Known Gun"
3. "Where to Now St Peter?"
4. "Holiday Inn"
5. "Madman Across the Water"
6. "Levon"
7. "Hercules"
8. "Mona Lisas and Mad Hatters"
9. "Roy Rogers"
10. "High Flying Bird"
11. "Better Off Dead"
12. "Empty Garden (Hey Hey Johnny)"
13. "Something About the Way You Look Tonight"
14. "The Bridge"
15. "Burn Down the Mission"

== Personnel ==
- Elton John - piano, vocals
- Davey Johnstone - guitars, vocals
- Bob Birch - bass guitar, vocals
- Guy Babylon - keyboards
- Nigel Olsson - drums, vocals
- John Mahon - percussion, vocals
- Martin Tillman - cellist

== Charts ==
Chart (2007)	Peak position
Australian Music DVDs Chart	26
Belgian (Flanders) Music DVDs Chart	10
Danish Music DVDs Chart	2
Irish Music DVDs Chart	10
Italian Music DVDs Chart	7
New Zealand Music DVDs Chart	8
Spanish Music DVDs Chart	12
Swedish Music DVDs Chart	9
US Music Videos Chart	1

== Certifications ==
Region	Certification	Certified units/sales
Australia (ARIA)	Gold	7,500^{^}
^{^} Shipments figures based on certification alone.
