= Farewell Yellow Brick Road =

2018–23 concert tour by Elton John

- Tour by Elton John
- Promotional poster
- Location: Europe; North America; Oceania
- Start date: 8 September 2018
- End date: 8 July 2023
- Legs: 9
- No. of shows: 330
- Attendance: 6.1 million
- Box office: $939.1 million

Elton John concert chronology
- Wonderful Crazy Night Tour (2016–18); Farewell Yellow Brick Road (2018–23)

Farewell Yellow Brick Road was the forty-ninth and final concert tour by British musician Elton John. It began in Allentown, Pennsylvania, US, on 8 September 2018, and ended in Stockholm, Sweden, on 8 July 2023. It consisted of 330 concerts worldwide. The tour grossed $939.1 million, making it the third-highest-grossing tour of all time. The tour's name and its poster reference John's 1973 album Goodbye Yellow Brick Road.

== Background ==
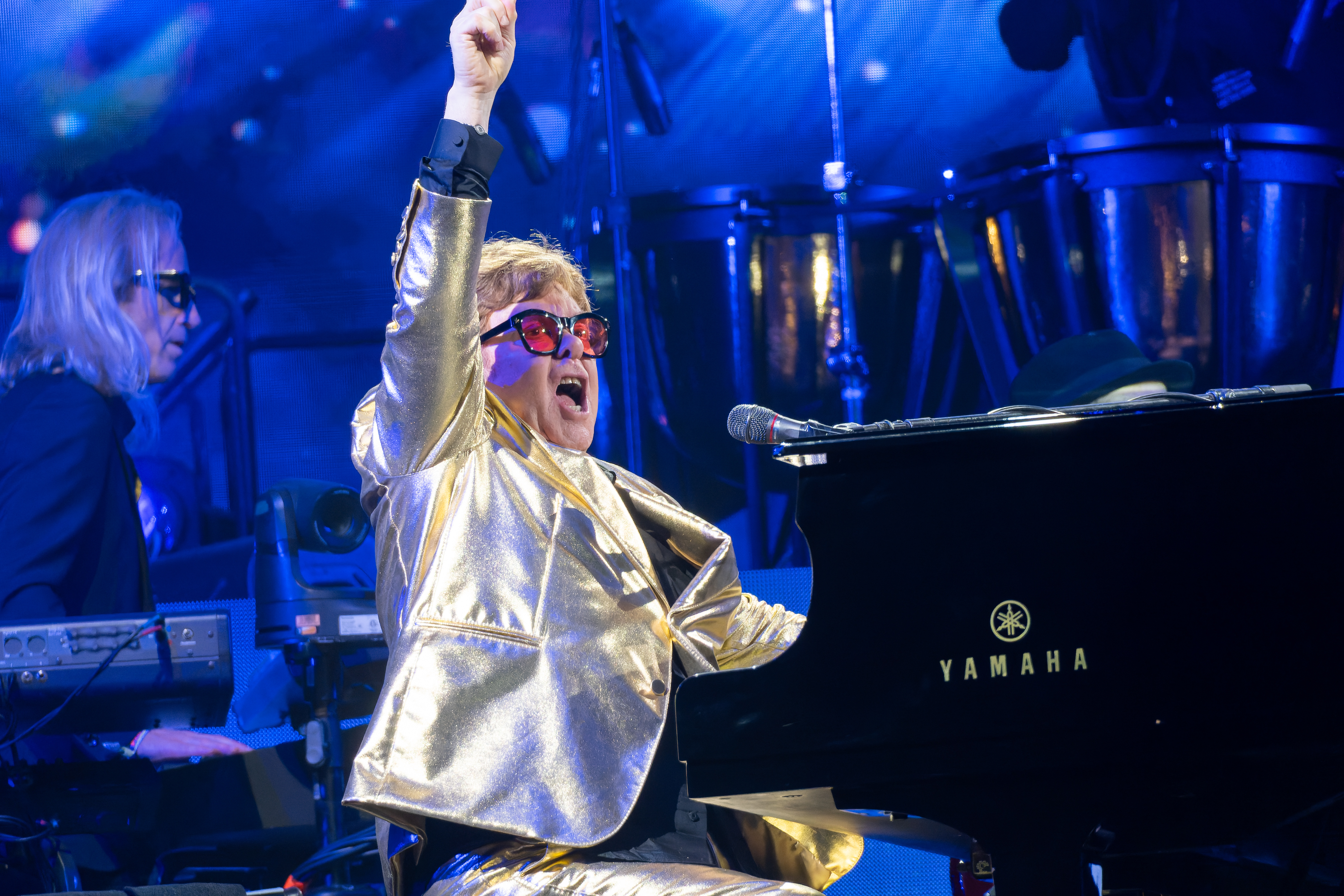
Elton John performing "Rocket Man" during his 2023 Glastonbury show

On 24 January 2018, it was announced that Elton John would be retiring from touring and would soon embark on a three-year tour. The first concert was announced to take place at the PPL Center in Allentown, Pennsylvania on 8 September 2018 followed by an extensive tour of the United States and Canada before moving on to Europe. John cited spending time with his children along with David Furnish as the reason for his retirement. Tickets went on sale on 24 February and within hours tickets for the first 60 shows were sold out.

Further North American tour dates were announced on 26 September 2018. John's official website stated: "Salt Lake City, Tacoma, Memphis, Charlotte and Western Canada as well as return dates in Toronto, Philadelphia, Nashville, Cleveland and more". Thirteen days later, concerts were revealed for Lille, Paris, Bordeaux and Nîmes, taking place in Summer 2019.

A Winter 2020 tour taking place in the United Kingdom and Ireland was announced on 8 November 2018. The original announcement detailed sixteen concerts taking place across England, Scotland, Ireland and Northern Ireland. It was later postponed to 2021, along with the rest of the second European leg and the third North American leg, due to the COVID-19 pandemic. On 15 September 2021, the European leg was postponed to 2023 after John sustained a hip injury.

On 23 June 2021, a stadium leg was announced which was to go across Europe, North America and Oceania. It should have started in Frankfurt in the Deutsche Bank Park, but the new stadium stage had already been used in Oslo in the Telenor Arena. The stadium tour stopped in several major cities such as Milan, Paris, Liverpool, London, Philadelphia, Chicago, Washington D.C., Las Vegas, in Los Angeles with three shows at Dodger Stadium, Melbourne, Sydney and Brisbane.

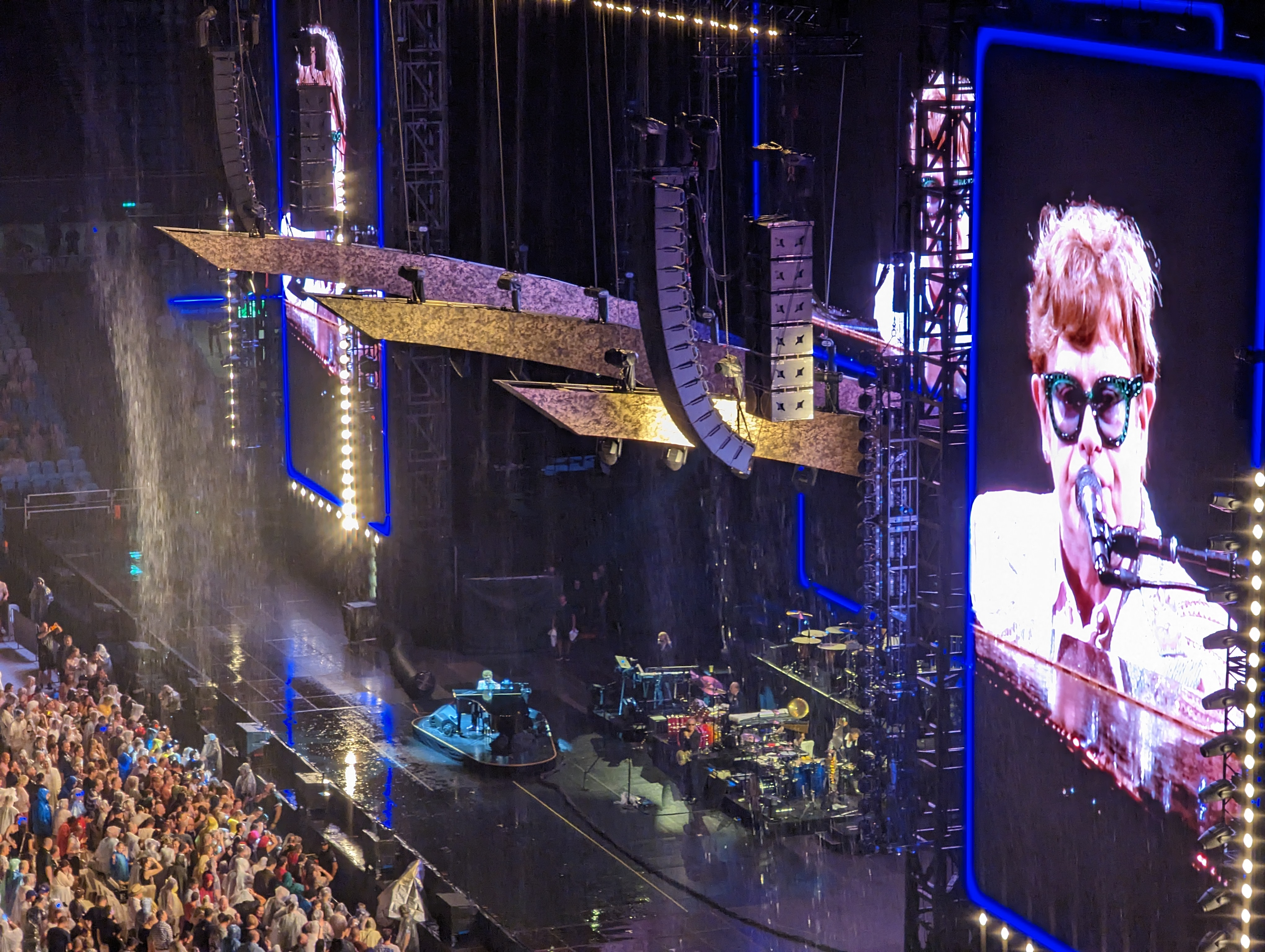
John performing in Sydney, Australia, on 18 January 2023

After it was announced in January 2022 that the tour would resume, music director Davey Johnstone stated that the band would wear masks and have tests every two days during the tour. John's first show back took place in New Orleans, Louisiana. He had to temporarily postpone two shows in Dallas after testing positive for COVID-19 and experiencing mild symptoms, and resumed the tour again after making a full recovery. John would go on to perform tour dates across the UK and Europe for 2022 and 2023, when the tour wrapped up. At the 27 March 2022 performance in Lincoln, Nebraska, a live hookup was established during the concert and Elton's Oscars charity benefit, which he had not missed in 30 years of hosting, but opted to perform in Lincoln on that date because of the postponements. During the 24 September 2022 performance at Washington, D.C., United States President Joe Biden and First Lady Jill Biden invited John to perform at the White House, where he was presented with the National Humanities Medal.

On 2 December 2022, John announced the final show of his UK Tour would be headlining Glastonbury Festival in 2023 saying "There is no more fitting way to say goodbye to my British fans". The show was watched by 120,000 people on site and with an average of 7.3 million viewers on BBC One, breaking the record of Diana Ross, who held it with 3.1 million viewers, making him the most watched festival act ever. The tour ended in Stockholm, Sweden, on 8 July 2023.

== Commercial performance ==
John announced the farewell tour in January 2018 with arena legs in both North America and Europe, to begin in Pennsylvania in September 2018. By the end of the first leg of the tour in North American arenas, on 18 March 2019, it had grossed over $125 million and won a Billboard Music Award in the category Top Rock Tour.

The tour's first three North American legs combined to $268.2 million over 116 shows, while his North American stadium run from July – Nov. 2022 brought in $222.1 million across 33 shows. The tour's 2019 European arena leg grossed $49.9 million, while the 2022 European stadium leg grossed $69.2 million in 2022, resulting in a combined worldwide total of $749.9 million from 5 million tickets sold by November 2022.

In January 2023, the Oceania leg grossed $40.9 million and sold 242,000 tickets. In total, the Australia & NZ shows in 2020 & 2023 have sold 875,000 tickets alone. By the end of the Oceania stadium leg in January 2023, Billboard reported that the tour has grossed $817.9 million from 278 shows and over 5.3 million tickets sold, making it the highest-grossing tour of all-time after surpassing the previous record-holder, Ed Sheeran's ÷ Tour at $776.2 million. It became the first tour in history to surpass $800 million, and $900 million.

By the final show in July 2023, the tour surpassed $939.1 million in gross and 6.1 million ticket sales, extending the record for highest-grossing tour in history.

== Recordings ==
On 30 May 2018, it was announced that John had partnered with Peex to personalise the volume for fans' concert experiences, plus recording the show to relive it.

On 18 May 2022, Disney Original Documentary and Disney+ announced that John's November 2022 shows at Dodger Stadium would be recorded for a documentary titled Goodbye Yellow Brick Road: The Final Elton John Performances and the Years That Made His Legend, directed by R.J. Cutler and David Furnish. The film premiered at the 2024 Toronto International Film Festival as Elton John: Never Too Late.

Before that, the Dodger Stadium concert on 20 November 2022 was livestreamed on Disney+ as Elton John Live: Farewell from Dodger Stadium. That concert featured guest appearances by Brandi Carlile, Kiki Dee and Dua Lipa. The recording would go on to win the Primetime Emmy Award for Outstanding Variety Special (Live) at the 75th ceremony in 2024, allowing John to attain EGOT status.

John's Glastonbury set on 25 June was broadcast on BBC One and BBC Radio 2.

== Set list ==
=== 2019−2020 ===
1. "Bennie and the Jets"
2. "All the Girls Love Alice"
3. "I Guess That's Why They Call It the Blues"
4. "Border Song"
5. "Tiny Dancer"
6. "Philadelphia Freedom"
7. "Indian Sunset"
8. "Rocket Man"
9. "Take Me to the Pilot"
10. "Sorry Seems to Be the Hardest Word"
11. "Someone Saved My Life Tonight"
12. "Levon"
13. "Candle in the Wind"
14. "Funeral for a Friend/Love Lies Bleeding"
15. "Burn Down the Mission"
16. "Daniel"
17. "Believe"
18. "Sad Songs (Say So Much)"
19. "Don't Let the Sun Go Down on Me"
20. "The Bitch Is Back"
21. "I'm Still Standing"
22. "Crocodile Rock"
23. "Saturday Night's Alright for Fighting"
  Encore
24. "Your Song"
25. "Goodbye Yellow Brick Road"

=== 2022−2023 ===
1. "Bennie and the Jets"
2. "Philadelphia Freedom"
3. "I Guess That's Why They Call It the Blues"
4. "Border Song"
5. "Tiny Dancer"
6. "Have Mercy on the Criminal"
7. "Rocket Man"
8. "Take Me to the Pilot"
9. "Someone Saved My Life Tonight"
10. "Levon"
11. "Candle in the Wind"
12. "Funeral for a Friend/Love Lies Bleeding"
13. "Burn Down the Mission"
14. "Sad Songs (Say So Much)"
15. "Sorry Seems to Be the Hardest Word"
16. "Don't Let the Sun Go Down on Me"
17. "The Bitch Is Back"
18. "I'm Still Standing"
19. "Crocodile Rock"
20. "Saturday Night's Alright for Fighting"
  Encore
21. "Cold Heart (Pnau remix)"
22. "Your Song"
23. "Goodbye Yellow Brick Road"

=== Notes ===
- Throughout the tour, "Don't Let the Sun Go Down on Me" was dedicated to several people who passed and late friends of John's, including Queen Elizabeth II, Ryan White, George Michael, Shane Warne, Taylor Hawkins; his former bandmates Dee Murray, Bob Birch, Roger Pope, and Guy Babylon; and the people of Ukraine following the 2022 Russian invasion.
- From 2 November 2019 to 4 February 2020, "I Want Love" replaced "Believe".
- "Mona Lisas and Mad Hatters" was performed on select dates in July 2022.
- During the Greensboro show, John gave a shout-out to Nathan Chen and other members of the figure skating team were in attendance at the concert.
- During the Hollywood show, John only performed "Funeral for a Friend/Love Lies Bleeding", "Bennie and the Jets" , "I Guess That's Why They Call It the Blues", "Tiny Dancer", "Rocket Man", "Take Me to the Pilot", "Someone Saved My Life Tonight", "Levon", "Candle in the Wind", "Burn Down the Mission", "Sad Songs (Say So Much)", "Don't Let the Sun Go Down on Me", "The Bitch Is Back", "I'm Still Standing", "Crocodile Rock", "Saturday Night's Alright for Fighting", and "Your Song".
- During the final show in Los Angeles, Brandi Carlile, Kiki Dee, and Dua Lipa joined John onstage to perform "Don't Let the Sun Go Down on Me", "Don't Go Breaking My Heart", and "Cold Heart", respectively.
- During the show at Glastonbury, John only performed "Pinball Wizard", "The Bitch Is Back", "Bennie and the Jets", "Daniel", "Goodbye Yellow Brick Road", "I Guess That's Why They Call It the Blues", "Philadelphia Freedom", "Are You Ready for Love" with Jacob Lusk, "Sad Songs (Say So Much)", "Someone Saved My Life Tonight", "Until I Found You" with Stephen Sanchez, "Your Song", "Candle in the Wind", "Tiny Dancer" with Brandon Flowers, "Don't Go Breaking My Heart" with Rina Sawayama, "Crocodile Rock", "Saturday Night's Alright for Fighting", "I'm Still Standing", "Cold Heart", "Don't Let the Sun Go Down on Me", and "Rocket Man".
- During the final show in Stockholm, Coldplay appeared on the screen via a live broadcast to send him a retirement message.

== Tour dates ==
List of 2018 concerts
Date (2018)	City	Country	Venue	Attendance	Revenue
8 September	Allentown	United States	PPL Center	8,983 / 8,983	$1,492,859
11 September	Philadelphia	United States	Wells Fargo Center	29,531 / 29,531	$4,273,021
12 September	Philadelphia	United States	Wells Fargo Center	29,531 / 29,531	$4,273,021
15 September	Buffalo	United States	KeyBank Center	15,581 / 15,641	$2,033,001
16 September	University Park	United States	Bryce Jordan Center	12,421 / 12,421	$1,662,468
19 September	Hartford	United States	XL Center	12,311 / 12,311	$1,430,695
21 September	Washington, D.C.	United States	Capital One Arena	30,315 / 30,315	$4,464,426
22 September	Washington, D.C.	United States	Capital One Arena	30,315 / 30,315	$4,464,426
25 September	Toronto	Canada	Scotiabank Arena	31,886 / 31,886	$3,590,343
26 September	Toronto	Canada	Scotiabank Arena	31,886 / 31,886	$3,590,343
28 September	Ottawa	Canada	Canadian Tire Centre	14,160 / 14,160	$1,330,020
29 September	Quebec City	Canada	Videotron Centre	14,553 / 14,553	$1,473,260
4 October	Montreal	Canada	Bell Centre	16,466 / 16,466	$1,681,260
6 October	Boston	United States	TD Garden	13,946 / 14,168	$1,953,520
9 October	Uniondale	United States	Nassau Coliseum	11,984 / 11,984	$1,648,995
10 October	Pittsburgh	United States	PPG Paints Arena	14,452 / 14,452	$1,998,879
12 October	Detroit	United States	Little Caesars Arena	30,218 / 30,218	$4,037,241
13 October	Detroit	United States	Little Caesars Arena	30,218 / 30,218	$4,037,241
15 October	Grand Rapids	United States	Van Andel Arena	12,689 / 12,689	$1,698,338
18 October	New York City	United States	Madison Square Garden	58,949 / 58,949 (Note: Boxscore data is combined for shows on 18–19 and 26–27 October 2018)	$10,024,748
19 October	New York City	United States	Madison Square Garden	58,949 / 58,949	$10,024,748
23 October	Louisville	United States	KFC Yum! Center	17,412 / 17,412	$1,990,938
24 October	Nashville	United States	Bridgestone Arena	14,447 / 14,513	$2,179,947
26 October	Chicago	United States	United Center	31,066 / 31,066	$4,431,187
27 October	Chicago	United States	United Center	31,066 / 31,066	$4,431,187
30 October	St. Louis	United States	Enterprise Center	15,495 / 15,495	$1,867,478
2 November	Columbus	United States	Schottenstein Center	14,399 / 14,399	$1,708,401
3 November	Cleveland	United States	Quicken Loans Arena	16,252 / 16,252	$1,923,705
6 November	Boston	United States	TD Garden	14,073 / 14,073	$2,047,084
8 November	New York City	United States	Madison Square Garden	—	—
9 November	New York City	United States	Madison Square Garden	—	—
23 November	Sunrise	United States	BB&T Center	14,182 / 14,182	$2,055,879
24 November	Miami	United States	American Airlines Arena	13,996 / 13,996	$2,119,362
30 November	Atlanta	United States	State Farm Arena	24,920 / 24,920	$3,310,272
1 December	Atlanta	United States	State Farm Arena	24,920 / 24,920	$3,310,272
4 December	Birmingham	United States	Legacy Arena	13,774 / 13,774	$1,466,013
6 December	New Orleans	United States	Smoothie King Center	14,573 / 14,573	$1,807,489
8 December	Houston	United States	Toyota Center	25,794 / 25,794	$3,958,024
9 December	Houston	United States	Toyota Center	25,794 / 25,794	$3,958,024
12 December	San Antonio	United States	AT&T Center	15,037 / 15,037	$1,707,532
14 December	Dallas	United States	American Airlines Center	28,928 / 28,928	$4,297,806
15 December	Dallas	United States	American Airlines Center	28,928 / 28,928	$4,297,806

List of 2019 concerts
Date (2019)	City	Country	Venue	Attendance	Revenue
11 January	Boise	United States	Taco Bell Arena	9,063 / 9,063	$1,189,869
12 January	Portland	United States	Moda Center	14,584 / 14,584	$1,843,608
15 January	Fresno	United States	Save Mart Center	12,271 / 12,271	$1,677,265
16 January	Sacramento	United States	Golden 1 Center	14,241 / 14,241	$1,860,305
18 January	Oakland	United States	Oracle Arena	14,749 / 14,749	$2,017,373
19 January	San Jose	United States	SAP Center	13,835 / 13,835	$1,992,673
22 January	Los Angeles	United States	Staples Center	57,213 / 57,213 (Note: Boxscore data is combined for shows on 22–25 and 30 January 2019)	$8,513,984
23 January	Los Angeles	United States	Staples Center	57,213 / 57,213	$8,513,984
25 January	Los Angeles	United States	Staples Center	57,213 / 57,213	$8,513,984
26 January	Glendale	United States	Gila River Arena	13,899 / 13,899	$1,864,926
29 January	San Diego	United States	Pechanga Arena	11,517 / 11,555	$1,361,249
30 January	Los Angeles	United States	Staples Center	—	—
1 February	Inglewood (Note: Promoted as Los Angeles)	United States	The Forum	29,408 / 29,408	$3,973,836
2 February	Inglewood	United States	The Forum	29,408 / 29,408	$3,973,836
6 February	Denver	United States	Pepsi Center	27,711 / 27,711	$4,208,205
7 February	Denver	United States	Pepsi Center	27,711 / 27,711	$4,208,205
9 February	Tulsa	United States	BOK Center	13,363 / 13,363	$1,629,219
12 February	Omaha	United States	CHI Health Center Omaha	14,738 / 14,738	$1,811,131
13 February	Kansas City	United States	Sprint Center	14,292 / 14,292	$1,974,229
15 February	Rosemont	United States	Allstate Arena	28,400 / 28,400	$3,942,660
16 February	Rosemont	United States	Allstate Arena	28,400 / 28,400	$3,942,660
21 February	Minneapolis	United States	Target Center	29,949 / 29,949	$4,205,786
22 February	Minneapolis	United States	Target Center	29,949 / 29,949	$4,205,786
27 February	Cincinnati	United States	U.S. Bank Arena	13,456 / 13,456	$1,678,397
1 March	Albany	United States	Times Union Center	12,617 / 12,617	$1,629,499
2 March	Newark	United States	Prudential Center	13,949 / 13,949	$2,141,546
5 March	New York City	United States	Madison Square Garden	29,821 / 29,821	$5,249,700
6 March	New York City	United States	Madison Square Garden	29,821 / 29,821	$5,249,700
8 March	Brooklyn	United States	Barclays Center	30,108 / 30,108	$4,295,346
9 March	Brooklyn	United States	Barclays Center	30,108 / 30,108	$4,295,346
12 March	Raleigh	United States	PNC Arena	14,885 / 14,885	$2,050,728
13 March	Columbia	United States	Colonial Life Arena	13,331 / 13,331	$1,833,220
15 March	Jacksonville	United States	VyStar Veterans Memorial Arena	12,370 / 12,370	$1,779,255
16 March	Sunrise	United States	BB&T Center	14,517 / 14,517	$2,109,042
18 March (Note: Rescheduled from 27 November 2018 due to John's ear infection.)	Orlando	United States	Amway Center	13,446 / 13,446	$1,833,937
1 May	Vienna	Austria	Wiener Stadthalle	20,565 / 20,565	$2,706,734
2 May	Vienna	Austria	Wiener Stadthalle	20,565 / 20,565	$2,706,734
4 May	Kraków	Poland	Tauron Arena Kraków	13,972 / 13,972	$1,164,007
7 May	Prague	Czech Republic	O_{2} Arena	13,722 / 13,722	$1,500,712
9 May	Bremen	Germany	ÖVB Arena	8,656 / 8,656	$973,112
11 May	Stuttgart	Germany	Hanns-Martin-Schleyer-Halle	9,841 / 9,841	$1,444,671
12 May	Oberhausen	Germany	König Pilsener Arena	10,139 / 10,139	$1,204,533
18 May	Copenhagen	Denmark	Royal Arena	26,465 / 26,465 (Note: Boxscore data is combined for shows on 18 May and 6 June 2019)	$4,117,900
19 May	Gothenburg	Sweden	Scandinavium	9,701 / 9,701	$1,157,857
22 May	Hanover	Germany	TUI Arena	9,808 / 9,920	$1,101,335
23 May	Antwerp	Belgium	Sportpaleis	16,348 / 16,348	$1,588,629
26 May	Munich	Germany	Olympiahalle	11,108 / 11,108	$1,227,321
29 May	Verona	Italy	Verona Arena	11,932 / 11,932	$1,122,434
1 June	Wiesbaden	Germany	Bowling Green	10,280 / 10,280	$1,159,911
4 June	Bergen	Norway	Koengen	22,500 / 22,500	$2,201,784
6 June	Copenhagen	Denmark	Royal Arena	—	—
8 June	Amsterdam	Netherlands	Ziggo Dome	25,315 / 25,315 (Note: Boxscore data is combined for shows on 8 and 17 June 2019)	$2,047,986
9 June	Hove	England	First Central County Ground	18,210 / 18,210	$1,935,090
12 June	Dublin	Ireland	3Arena	16,848 / 16,848	$3,048,861
13 June	Dublin	Ireland	3Arena	16,848 / 16,848	$3,048,861
15 June	Cardiff	Wales	Cardiff City Stadium	30,558 / 30,558	$2,863,159
17 June (Note: Rescheduled from 15 May 2019 due to band illness.)	Amsterdam	Netherlands	Ziggo Dome	—	—
18 June	Villeneuve-d'Ascq (Note: Promoted as Lille)	France	Stade Pierre-Mauroy	26,517 / 26,517	$2,630,997
20 June	Paris	France	AccorHotels Arena	12,653 / 13,081	$2,192,829
22 June	Bordeaux	France	Arkéa Arena	8,044 / 8,044	$1,371,623
23 June (Note: Part of the Festival de Nîmes.)	Nîmes	France	Arena of Nîmes	14,000 / 14,000	$1,485,776
26 June	Madrid	Spain	WiZink Center	11,490 / 11,490	$1,129,930
29 June (Note: Part of the Montreux Jazz Festival. Originally scheduled to take place at Auditorium Stravinski on 29 and 30 June 2019, the venue was moved due to production demands.)	Montreux	Switzerland	Stadium Saussaz	14,723 / 14,723	$3,108,660
3 July	Graz	Austria	Messe Congress Graz	9,675 / 9,675	$1,318,618
5 July	Munich	Germany	Olympiahalle	11,532 / 11,532	$1,277,077
7 July (Note: Part of the Lucca Summer Festival.)	Lucca	Italy	Mura Storiche	19,737 / 19,737	$2,266,040
4 September	Salt Lake City	United States	Vivint Smart Home Arena	13,521 / 13,521	$1,802,270
6 September	Paradise (Note: Promoted as Las Vegas)	United States	T-Mobile Arena	31,274 / 31,274	$4,596,868
7 September	Paradise	United States	T-Mobile Arena	31,274 / 31,274	$4,596,868
10 September	Anaheim	United States	Honda Center	27,870 / 27,870	$3,776,139
11 September	Anaheim	United States	Honda Center	27,870 / 27,870	$3,776,139
13 September	San Francisco	United States	Chase Center	28,380 / 28,380	$4,374,647
15 September	San Francisco	United States	Chase Center	28,380 / 28,380	$4,374,647
17 September	Tacoma	United States	Tacoma Dome	38,728 / 38,728	$5,833,950
18 September	Tacoma	United States	Tacoma Dome	38,728 / 38,728	$5,833,950
21 September	Vancouver	Canada	Rogers Arena	45,425 / 45,425	$5,329,012
22 September	Vancouver	Canada	Rogers Arena	45,425 / 45,425	$5,329,012
24 September	Vancouver	Canada	Rogers Arena	45,425 / 45,425	$5,329,012
27 September	Edmonton	Canada	Rogers Place	30,806 / 30,806	$3,216,169
28 September	Edmonton	Canada	Rogers Place	30,806 / 30,806	$3,216,169
1 October	Saskatoon	Canada	SaskTel Centre	26,380 / 26,380	$2,615,473
2 October	Saskatoon	Canada	SaskTel Centre	26,380 / 26,380	$2,615,473
4 October	Winnipeg	Canada	Bell MTS Place	25,283 / 25,283	$2,725,778
5 October	Winnipeg	Canada	Bell MTS Place	25,283 / 25,283	$2,725,778
19 October (Note: Rescheduled from 19 February 2019 due to necessary technical production adjustments.)	Milwaukee	United States	Fiserv Forum	13,012 / 13,012	$1,718,769
23 October	Toronto	Canada	Scotiabank Arena	32,202 / 32,202	$3,767,643
24 October (Note: Rescheduled from 22 October 2019 to avoid conflict with the Toronto Raptors' Home Opener.)	Toronto	Canada	Scotiabank Arena	32,202 / 32,202	$3,767,643
28 October	Nashville	United States	Bridgestone Arena	14,624 / 14,624	$2,320,071
30 October	Memphis	United States	FedExForum	14,435 / 14,435	$1,825,808
1 November	Atlanta	United States	State Farm Arena	23,708 / 23,708	$3,897,797
2 November	Atlanta	United States	State Farm Arena	23,708 / 23,708	$3,897,797
4 November (Note: Rescheduled from 28 November 2018 due to John's ear infection.)	Tampa	United States	Amalie Arena	14,961 / 14,961	$2,190,160
6 November	Charlotte	United States	Spectrum Center	15,834 / 15,834	$2,163,283
8 November	Philadelphia	United States	Wells Fargo Center	31,230 / 31,230	$4,608,305
9 November	Philadelphia	United States	Wells Fargo Center	31,230 / 31,230	$4,608,305
11 November	Cleveland	United States	Rocket Mortgage FieldHouse	16,621 / 16,621	$2,168,485
13 November	Pittsburgh	United States	PPG Paints Arena	15,011 / 15,011	$2,182,135
15 November	Boston	United States	TD Garden	14,112 / 14,112	$2,046,734
16 November	Uniondale	United States	Nassau Coliseum	12,125 / 12,125	$1,722,978
30 November	Perth	Australia	Perth Oval	44,079 / 45,415	$5,965,750
1 December	Perth	Australia	Perth Oval	44,079 / 45,415	$5,965,750
4 December	Adelaide	Australia	Adelaide Botanic Park	32,523 / 32,966	$3,603,260
5 December	Adelaide	Australia	Adelaide Botanic Park	32,523 / 32,966	$3,603,260
7 December (Note: Part of A Day on the Green.)	Geelong	Australia	Mt Duneed Estate	20,849 / 20,849	$2,160,861
10 December	Melbourne	Australia	Rod Laver Arena	51,556 / 52,838	$7,994,560
11 December	Melbourne	Australia	Rod Laver Arena	51,556 / 52,838	$7,994,560
14 December	Melbourne	Australia	Rod Laver Arena	51,556 / 52,838	$7,994,560
15 December	Melbourne	Australia	Rod Laver Arena	51,556 / 52,838	$7,994,560
18 December	Brisbane	Australia	Brisbane Entertainment Centre	21,425 / 23,210	$2,979,870
19 December	Brisbane	Australia	Brisbane Entertainment Centre	21,425 / 23,210	$2,979,870
21 December	Sydney	Australia	First State Super Theatre	16,337 / 16,407	$2,752,960
23 December	Sydney	Australia	First State Super Theatre	16,337 / 16,407	$2,752,960

List of 2020 concerts
Date	City	Country	Venue	Attendance	Revenue
7 January	Sydney	Australia	Qudos Bank Arena	44,438 / 44,438 (Note: Boxscore combined with the boxscore from 7 and 9 January 2020.)	$6,235,455
9 January	Sydney	Australia	Qudos Bank Arena	44,438 / 44,438	$6,235,455
11 January	Hunter Valley	Australia	Hope Estate Winery	38,200 / 38,343	$5,217,200
12 January	Hunter Valley	Australia	Hope Estate Winery	38,200 / 38,343	$5,217,200
14 January	Sydney	Australia	Qudos Bank Arena	—	—
16 January	Brisbane	Australia	Brisbane Entertainment Centre	10,830 / 10,892	$1,568,700
18 January	Mount Cotton	Australia	Sirromet Wines	26,185 / 26,185	$3,229,690
19 January	Mount Cotton	Australia	Sirromet Wines	26,185 / 26,185	$3,229,690
22 January	Bathurst	Australia	Carrington Park	19,149 / 20,063	$2,330,340
25 January	Macedon (Note: Promoted as Woodend)	Australia	Hanging Rock	40,327 / 40,327	$4,456,150
26 January	Macedon	Australia	Hanging Rock	40,327 / 40,327	$4,456,150
29 January	Wahgunyah (Note: Promoted as Rutherglen)	Australia	All Saints Estate Winery	11,175 / 11,175	$1,324,180
31 January	Coldstream (Note: Promoted as Yarra Valley)	Australia	Rochford Winery Yarra Valley	24,440 / 24,440	$2,699,520
1 February	Coldstream	Australia	Rochford Winery Yarra Valley	24,440 / 24,440	$2,699,520
4 February	Dunedin	New Zealand	Forsyth Barr Stadium	33,731 / 34,035	$4,117,990
6 February	Napier (Note: Promoted as Hawke's Bay)	New Zealand	Mission Estate Winery	52,979 / 52,979	$5,838,600
15 February (Note: Rescheduled from 8 February 2020.)	Napier	New Zealand	Mission Estate Winery	52,979 / 52,979	$5,838,600
16 February (Note: The show, originally scheduled for 9 February 2020, ended early due to loss of voice.)	Auckland	New Zealand	Mount Smart Stadium	35,350 / 35,453	$4,825,850
22 February	Melbourne	Australia	AAMI Park	29,967 / 30,536	$4,430,850
25 February	Coffs Harbour	Australia	Coffs Harbour International Stadium	33,055 / 33,241	$3,992,190
26 February	Coffs Harbour	Australia	Coffs Harbour International Stadium	33,055 / 33,241	$3,992,190
29 February	Townsville	Australia	North Queensland Stadium	21,535 / 21,817	$2,323,100
3 March	Sunshine Coast	Australia	Sunshine Coast Stadium	30,023 / 30,023	$4,363,793
4 March	Sunshine Coast	Australia	Sunshine Coast Stadium	30,023 / 30,023	$4,363,793
7 March	Parramatta (Note: Promoted as Sydney)	Australia	Western Sydney Stadium	26,596 / 26,596	$4,311,638

List of 2022 concerts (Note: Dates from 19 January to 28 April 2022 were originally scheduled from 26 March to 8 July 2020, but were postponed due to the COVID-19 pandemic.)
Date (2022)	City	Country	Venue	Attendance	Revenue
19 January	New Orleans	United States	Smoothie King Center	14,454 / 14,454	$1,972,978
21 January	Houston	United States	Toyota Center	25,951 / 25,951	$4,243,554
22 January	Houston	United States	Toyota Center	25,951 / 25,951	$4,243,554
29 January	North Little Rock	United States	Simmons Bank Arena	15,482 / 15,482	$2,476,445
30 January	Oklahoma City	United States	Paycom Center	13,393 / 13,393	$1,865,204
1 February	Kansas City	United States	T-Mobile Center	13,741 / 13,741	$2,368,483
4 February	Chicago	United States	United Center	30,467 / 30,467	$5,436,666
5 February	Chicago	United States	United Center	30,467 / 30,467	$5,436,666
8 February	Detroit	United States	Little Caesars Arena	28,278 / 28,278	$5,175,499
9 February	Detroit	United States	Little Caesars Arena	28,278 / 28,278	$5,175,499
22 February	New York City	United States	Madison Square Garden	29,893 / 29,893	$6,860,968
23 February	New York City	United States	Madison Square Garden	29,893 / 29,893	$6,860,968
25 February	Newark	United States	Prudential Center	13,889 / 13,889	$2,674,238
27 February	Hollywood	United States	Hard Rock Live	6,519 / 6,519	$2,991,322
1 March	Brooklyn	United States	Barclays Center	29,365 / 29,365	$4,907,543
2 March	Brooklyn	United States	Barclays Center	29,365 / 29,365	$4,907,543
5 March	Uniondale	United States	Nassau Coliseum	24,428 / 24,428	$4,358,411
6 March	Uniondale	United States	Nassau Coliseum	24,428 / 24,428	$4,358,411
10 March (Note: Rescheduled from 25 and 26 January 2022 due to John's extraction of COVID-19.)	Dallas	United States	American Airlines Center	28,661 / 28,661	$5,693,417
11 March	Dallas	United States	American Airlines Center	28,661 / 28,661	$5,693,417
19 March	Fargo	United States	Fargodome	20,896 / 20,896	$3,135,020
22 March	Saint Paul	United States	Xcel Energy Center	30,517 / 30,517	$5,696,798
23 March	Saint Paul	United States	Xcel Energy Center	30,517 / 30,517	$5,696,798
26 March	Des Moines	United States	Wells Fargo Arena	12,866 / 12,866	$1,942,673
27 March	Lincoln	United States	Pinnacle Bank Arena	13,143 / 13,143	$2,147,508
30 March	St. Louis	United States	Enterprise Center	13,801 / 13,801	$2,312,462
1 April (Note: Originally scheduled to take place on 25 October 2019, but John postponed it to 26 October due to illness. It was then moved to 26 March 2020 to accommodate with Toronto's rescheduled date, until finally being moved to 1 April because of the COVID-19 pandemic. After being rescheduled to 26 October 2019, the concert was postponed again to 26 March 2020 due to John falling ill.)	Indianapolis	United States	Gainbridge Fieldhouse	14,789 / 14,789	$2,312,462
2 April	Milwaukee	United States	Fiserv Forum	12,714 / 12,714	$1,825,203
5 April	Grand Rapids	United States	Van Andel Arena	11,939 / 11,939	$1,889,981
8 April	Knoxville	United States	Thompson–Boling Arena	15,842 / 15,842	$2,619,600
9 April	Lexington	United States	Rupp Arena	15,974 / 15,974	$2,338,510
12 April	Columbus	United States	Schottenstein Center	14,382 / 14,382	$2,289,637
13 April	Hershey	United States	Giant Center	14,488 / 14,488	$2,481,655
16 April	Louisville	United States	KFC Yum! Center	17,496 / 17,496	$2,222,386
19 April	Greensboro	United States	Greensboro Coliseum	15,635 / 15,635	$2,592,331
20 April	Columbia	United States	Colonial Life Arena	13,400 / 13,400	$1,876,370
23 April	Jacksonville	United States	VyStar Veterans Memorial Arena	12,599 / 12,599	$2,283,615
24 April	Tampa	United States	Amalie Arena	14,774 / 14,774	$2,210,391
27 April	Orlando	United States	Amway Center	13,555 / 13,555	$1,957,787
28 April	Miami	United States	FTX Arena	14,230 / 14,230	$2,991,909
21 May (Note: Rescheduled from 25 and 26 September 2021 due to John's hip surgery.)	Fornebu (Note: Promoted as Oslo)	Norway	Telenor Arena	38,989 / 38,989	$3,638,883
22 May	Fornebu	Norway	Telenor Arena	38,989 / 38,989	$3,638,883
27 May	Frankfurt	Germany	Deutsche Bank Park	32,693 / 32,693	$4,041,393
29 May	Leipzig	Germany	Red Bull Arena	30,781 / 30,781	$3,705,765
1 June	Bern	Switzerland	Stadion Wankdorf	19,936 / 19,936	$4,023,776
4 June	Milan	Italy	San Siro	48,885 / 48,885	$4,532,457
7 June	Horsens	Denmark	CASA Arena Horsens	25,000 / 25,000	$3,686,404
9 June	Arnhem	Netherlands	GelreDome	32,623 / 32,623	$3,663,843
11 June	Nanterre (Note: Promoted as Paris)	France	Paris La Défense Arena	62,220 / 62,220	$9,846,099
12 June	Nanterre	France	Paris La Défense Arena	62,220 / 62,220	$9,846,099
15 June	Norwich	England	Carrow Road	22,989 / 22,989	$3,672,322
17 June	Liverpool	England	Anfield	34,666 / 34,666	$4,659,375
19 June	Sunderland	England	Stadium of Light	33,771 / 33,771	$4,609,018
22 June	Bristol	England	Ashton Gate	42,090 / 42,090 (Note: Boxscore data is combined for shows on 22 and 26 June 2022)	$5,906,700
24 June (Note: The 24 June 2022 concert in London is part of American Express Presents BST Hyde Park.)	London	England	Hyde Park	—N/a	—N/a
26 June	Bristol	England	Ashton Gate	—	—
29 June	Swansea	Wales	Swansea.com Stadium	18,439 / 18,439	$2,468,309
1 July	Cork	Ireland	Páirc Uí Chaoimh	31,821 / 31,821	$4,514,326
3 July	Watford	England	Vicarage Road	38,357 / 38,357	$6,218,612
4 July	Watford	England	Vicarage Road	38,357 / 38,357	$6,218,612
15 July	Philadelphia	United States	Citizens Bank Park	38,870 / 38,870	$6,263,878
18 July	Detroit	United States	Comerica Park	33,838 / 33,838	$4,267,268
23 July	East Rutherford	United States	MetLife Stadium	99,827 / 99,827	$14,876,417
24 July	East Rutherford	United States	MetLife Stadium	99,827 / 99,827	$14,876,417
27 July	Foxborough	United States	Gillette Stadium	96,039 / 96,039	$16,681,506
28 July	Foxborough	United States	Gillette Stadium	96,039 / 96,039	$16,681,506
30 July	Cleveland	United States	Progressive Field	38,495 / 38,495	$5,812,888
5 August	Chicago	United States	Soldier Field	48,413 / 48,413	$7,118,811
7 September	Toronto	Canada	Rogers Centre	88,493 / 88,493	$12,758,371
8 September	Toronto	Canada	Rogers Centre	88,493 / 88,493	$12,758,371
10 September	Syracuse	United States	JMA Wireless Dome	37,231 / 37,231	$6,606,217
13 September	Charleston	United States	Credit One Stadium	12,178 / 12,178	$2,800,325
16 September	Pittsburgh	United States	PNC Park	38,058 / 38,058	$5,677,913
18 September	Charlotte	United States	Bank of America Stadium	49,349 / 49,394	$7,442,573
22 September	Atlanta	United States	Mercedes-Benz Stadium	47,156 / 47,156	$7,843,802
24 September	Washington, D.C.	United States	Nationals Park	39,434 / 39,434	$7,193,710
30 September	Arlington	United States	Globe Life Field	38,316 / 38,316	$6,876,473
2 October	Nashville	United States	Nissan Stadium	48,368 / 48,368	$7,700,419
8 October	Santa Clara	United States	Levi's Stadium	77,554 / 77,554	$13,424,470
9 October	Santa Clara	United States	Levi's Stadium	77,554 / 77,554	$13,424,470
16 October	Tacoma	United States	Tacoma Dome	37,806 / 37,806	$8,301,505
17 October	Tacoma	United States	Tacoma Dome	37,806 / 37,806	$8,301,505
21 October	Vancouver	Canada	BC Place	78,700 / 78,700	$11,875,443
22 October	Vancouver	Canada	BC Place	78,700 / 78,700	$11,875,443
29 October	San Antonio	United States	Alamodome	49,240 / 49,240	$8,296,026
1 November	Paradise	United States	Allegiant Stadium	45,792 / 45,792	$7,832,026
4 November	Denver	United States	Ball Arena	12,949 / 12,949	$4,336,028
9 November	San Diego	United States	Petco Park	38,828 / 38,828	$8,842,163
11 November	Phoenix	United States	Chase Field	99,394 combined	$15,682,863
12 November	Phoenix	United States	Chase Field	99,394 combined	$15,682,863
17 November	Los Angeles	United States	Dodger Stadium	142,970 / 142,970	$23,462,993
19 November	Los Angeles	United States	Dodger Stadium	142,970 / 142,970	$23,462,993
20 November	Los Angeles	United States	Dodger Stadium	142,970 / 142,970	$23,462,993

List of 2023 concerts (Note: The European leg was originally set to take place from September to December 2021, but were rescheduled due to John's hip injury.)
Date (2023)	City	Country	Venue	Attendance	Revenue
8 January	Newcastle	Australia	McDonald Jones Stadium	47,230 / 47,230	$8,424,664
10 January	Newcastle	Australia	McDonald Jones Stadium	47,230 / 47,230	$8,424,664
13 January	Melbourne	Australia	AAMI Park	58,129 / 58,129	$10,282,598
14 January	Melbourne	Australia	AAMI Park	58,129 / 58,129	$10,282,598
17 January	Sydney	Australia	Allianz Stadium	65,327 / 65,327	$11,274,550
18 January	Sydney	Australia	Allianz Stadium	65,327 / 65,327	$11,274,550
21 January	Brisbane	Australia	Suncorp Stadium	43,500 / 43,500	$6,950,826
24 January	Christchurch	New Zealand	Orangetheory Stadium	27,867 / 27,867	$3,964,296
23 March	Liverpool	England	M&S Bank Arena	18,730 / 18,730	$3,138,562
24 March	Liverpool	England	M&S Bank Arena	18,730 / 18,730	$3,138,562
26 March	Birmingham	England	Resorts World Arena	12,159 / 12,159	$2,077,333
28 March	Dublin	Ireland	3Arena	17,030 / 17,030	$3,309,770
29 March	Dublin	Ireland	3Arena	17,030 / 17,030	$3,309,770
31 March	Belfast	Northern Ireland	SSE Arena	8,224 / 8,224	$1,565,824
2 April	London	England	The O_{2} Arena	164,963 / 164,963 (Note: Boxscore data is combined for shows on 22 and 26 June 2022)	$28,062,692
4 April	London	England	The O_{2} Arena	164,963 / 164,963	$28,062,692
5 April	London	England	The O_{2} Arena	164,963 / 164,963	$28,062,692
8 April	London	England	The O_{2} Arena	164,963 / 164,963	$28,062,692
9 April	London	England	The O_{2} Arena	164,963 / 164,963	$28,062,692
12 April	London	England	The O_{2} Arena	164,963 / 164,963	$28,062,692
13 April	London	England	The O_{2} Arena	164,963 / 164,963	$28,062,692
16 April	London	England	The O_{2} Arena	164,963 / 164,963	$28,062,692
17 April	London	England	The O_{2} Arena	164,963 / 164,963	$28,062,692
27 April	Munich	Germany	Olympiahalle	11,556 / 11,556	$1,783,016
2 May	Hamburg	Germany	Barclays Arena	35,468 / 35,468	$5,769,268
4 May	Hamburg	Germany	Barclays Arena	35,468 / 35,468	$5,769,268
5 May	Hamburg	Germany	Barclays Arena	35,468 / 35,468	$5,769,268
8 May	Berlin	Germany	Mercedes-Benz Arena	36,293 / 36,293	$5,896,665
10 May	Berlin	Germany	Mercedes-Benz Arena	36,293 / 36,293	$5,896,665
11 May	Berlin	Germany	Mercedes-Benz Arena	36,293 / 36,293	$5,896,665
16 May	Cologne	Germany	Lanxess Arena	44,701 / 44,701	$6,392,290
18 May	Cologne	Germany	Lanxess Arena	44,701 / 44,701	$6,392,290
19 May	Cologne	Germany	Lanxess Arena	44,701 / 44,701	$6,392,290
22 May	Barcelona	Spain	Palau Sant Jordi	28,138 / 28,138	$3,392,473
23 May	Barcelona	Spain	Palau Sant Jordi	28,138 / 28,138	$3,392,473
27 May	Antwerp	Belgium	Sportpaleis	37,487 / 37,487	$4,829,492
28 May	Antwerp	Belgium	Sportpaleis	37,487 / 37,487	$4,829,492
30 May	London	England	The O_{2} Arena	—	—
31 May	Manchester	England	AO Arena	44,178 / 44,178	$7,436,134
2 June	Manchester	England	AO Arena	44,178 / 44,178	$7,436,134
3 June	Manchester	England	AO Arena	44,178 / 44,178	$7,436,134
6 June	Leeds	England	First Direct Arena	10,741 / 10,741	$3,199,513
8 June	Birmingham	England	Utilita Arena Birmingham	38,747 / 38,747	$5,869,785
10 June	Birmingham	England	Utilita Arena Birmingham	38,747 / 38,747	$5,869,785
11 June	Birmingham	England	Utilita Arena Birmingham	38,747 / 38,747	$5,869,785
13 June	Aberdeen	Scotland	P&J Live	20,301 / 20,301	$3,046,642
15 June	Aberdeen	Scotland	P&J Live	20,301 / 20,301	$3,046,642
17 June	Glasgow	Scotland	OVO Hydro	23,754 / 23,754	$4,215,054
18 June	Glasgow	Scotland	OVO Hydro	23,754 / 23,754	$4,215,054
21 June	Paris	France	Accor Arena	39,502 / 39,502 (Note: Boxscore data is combined for shows on 21 and 26–27 June 2023.)	$6,586,575
25 June (Note: Part of the Glastonbury Festival.)	Pilton	England	Worthy Farm	—N/a	—N/a
27 June	Paris	France	Accor Arena	—	—
28 June	Paris	France	Accor Arena	—	—
1 July	Zürich	Switzerland	Hallenstadion	21,000 / 21,000	$4,822,555
2 July	Zürich	Switzerland	Hallenstadion	21,000 / 21,000	$4,822,555
5 July	Copenhagen	Denmark	Royal Arena	13,458 / 13,458	$2,283,490
7 July	Stockholm	Sweden	Tele2 Arena	72,300 / 72,300	$7,635,445
8 July	Stockholm	Sweden	Tele2 Arena	72,300 / 72,300	$7,635,445
Total				5,994,810 / 6,003,519 (99.85%)	$891,832,542

=== Cancelled shows ===
Date	City	Country	Venue	Cause
30 May 2019	Verona	Italy	Verona Arena	Heavy cold
11 December 2020	Liverpool	England	M&S Bank Arena	Unforeseen circumstances
21 September 2021	Helsinki	Finland	Hartwall Arena	Initially postponed due to COVID-19 restrictions, later cancelled after the Russian invasion of Ukraine due to Russian ownership of the arena and failure to find a replacement
22 September 2021	Helsinki	Finland	Hartwall Arena	Initially postponed due to COVID-19 restrictions, later cancelled after the Russian invasion of Ukraine due to Russian ownership of the arena and failure to find a replacement
14 February 2022	Toronto	Canada	Scotiabank Arena	COVID-19 restrictions in Canada
15 February 2022	Toronto	Canada	Scotiabank Arena	COVID-19 restrictions in Canada
18 February 2022	Montreal	Canada	Bell Centre	COVID-19 restrictions in Canada
19 February 2022	Montreal	Canada	Bell Centre	COVID-19 restrictions in Canada
4 November 2022	Houston	United States	Minute Maid Park	Updated 2022 MLB postseason schedule
27 January 2023	Auckland	New Zealand	Mt Smart Stadium	2023 Auckland Anniversary Weekend floods
28 January 2023	Auckland	New Zealand	Mt Smart Stadium	2023 Auckland Anniversary Weekend floods
13 May 2023	Mannheim	Germany	SAP Arena	Virus infection

== Personnel ==
- Elton John – lead vocals, piano
- Davey Johnstone – guitars, backing vocals, (Note: On 22 March 2019 it was announced that Johnstone would temporarily leave the tour for the necessary surgery and recovery period, following a persistent shoulder injury.) music director
- Nigel Olsson – drums, backing vocals
- Matt Bissonette – bass guitar, backing vocals
- John Mahon – percussion, backing vocals
- Kim Bullard – keyboards
- Ray Cooper – percussion
- John Jorgenson – guitars, backing vocals (1 May 2019 – 7 July 2019)

== See also ==
- List of Billboard Boxscore number-one concert series of the 2020s
