= Friends (film soundtrack) =

"Friends" Original Soundtrack Recording

Soundtrack album by Elton John
- Released: 5 March 1971
- Recorded: September 1970
- Studios: Trident Studios, London
- Genres: Film music, soft rock
- Length: 37:51
- Label: Paramount
- Producer: Gus Dudgeon

Elton John chronology
Tumbleweed Connection (1970)	"Friends" Original Soundtrack Recording (1971)	17-11-70 (1971)

Singles from Friends
- 1. "Friends" Released: 10 March 1971

Professional ratings
Review scores
Source	Rating
AllMusic	3/5 stars
The Encyclopedia of Popular Music	1/5 stars

"Friends" Original Soundtrack Recording, released in 1971, is the first soundtrack album by Elton John. It was a project John and Bernie Taupin took on before their breakout success in the US, and served as the soundtrack album for the Friends film released in the same year. It was certified Gold in April 1971 by the RIAA. It became John's third gold record in as many months in that market (following the albums Elton John in February and Tumbleweed Connection in March). The title track was a minor hit in the US (#34 on the pop chart) despite the film's mediocre performance. The album also received a 1972 Grammy nomination for Best Original Score Written for a Motion Picture or Television Special at the 14th Annual Grammy Awards.

The rights to the soundtrack are now with Universal Music Group, which shares ownership of John's music with him, and which also owns the Paramount Records catalogue.

Apart from the original vinyl release in 1971, it has yet to be issued as a standalone CD, but the Friends soundtrack is available on the Rare Masters (1992) 2-CD set, tracks 10–19 on Disc One, albeit with the tracks in a different order to the original LP. The difference is that "Michelle's Song" changes places with "Honey Roll" and "Variations on Friends".

In the early 1970s, John performed the title track and "Can I Put You On" in concert, with the latter appearing on the next release, the live recording 17-11-70 (retitled 11-17-70 in North America). "Seasons Reprise" was heard on The Wonder Years season 3 episode "Night Out" where Kevin Arnold (Fred Savage) and Winnie Cooper (Danica McKellar) have their first kiss. The most recent performance of "Friends" was during the An Evening with Elton John tour in 1999.

== Track listing ==
All tracks written by Elton John and Bernie Taupin, except where noted.

Side one
No.	Title	Writer(s)	Length
1.	"Friends"		2:20
2.	"Honey Roll"		3:00
3.	"Variations on Friends Theme (The First Kiss)" (instrumental)	John, Paul Buckmaster	1:45
4.	"Seasons"		3:52
5.	"Variation on Michelle's Song (A Day in the Country)" (instrumental)	John, Buckmaster	2:44
6.	"Can I Put You On"		5:52

Side two
No.	Title	Writer(s)	Length
1.	"Michelle's Song"		4:16
2.	"I Meant to Do My Work Today (A Day in the Country)"	John, Buckmaster, lyrics: Richard Le Gallienne	1:33
3.	"Four Moods" (instrumental)	Buckmaster	10:56
4.	"Seasons Reprise"		1:33

== Personnel ==
Information taken from the original LP's liner notes.

- Elton John – piano, vocals
- Caleb Quaye – guitar ("Can I Put You On", "Honey Roll")
- Barry Morgan—drums ("Friends", "Michelle's Song")
- Dee Murray – bass guitar ("Can I Put You On", "Honey Roll")
- Nigel Olsson – drums ("Can I Put You On", "Honey Roll")
- Paul Buckmaster – orchestral arrangement
- Rex Morris – saxophone ("Honey Roll")
- Madeline Bell – backing vocals
- Lesley Duncan – backing vocals
- Liza Strike – backing vocals

=== Production ===
- Gus Dudgeon – producer
- John Gilbert – executive producer
- Robin Geoffrey Cable – engineer

== Charts ==
=== Weekly charts ===
Chart (1971)	Peak position
Australian Albums (Kent Music Report)	19
Canada Top Albums/CDs (RPM)	17
Dutch Albums (Album Top 100)	6
US Billboard 200	36

=== Year-end charts ===
Chart (1971)	Position
Dutch Albums (Album Top 100)	56

== Certifications ==
Region	Certification	Certified units/sales
United Kingdom (BPI)	Gold	100,000^{^}
United States (RIAA)	Gold	500,000^{^}
^{^} Shipments figures based on certification alone.
