= 17-11-70 =

Live album by Elton John
- Released: April 1971
- Recorded: 17 November 1970
- Venues: A&R Recording Studios, New York, NY, for a live radio broadcast on WABC-FM (later WPLJ)
- Genre: Rock
- Length: 48:25
- Labels: Uni (US); DJM (UK)
- Producer: Gus Dudgeon

Elton John chronology
Friends (1971)	17-11-70 (1971)	Madman Across the Water (1971)

Professional ratings
Review scores
Source	Rating
AllMusic	3.5/5 stars
The Encyclopedia of Popular Music	2/5 stars
Rolling Stone	(not rated)

17-11-70 (titled 11-17-70 in the United States) is the first live album by British musician Elton John.

== Background ==
The recording was taken from a live WABC-FM radio broadcast on 17 November 1970, hence the album's title. According to John, a live album was never planned as a release. Recordings of the broadcast, however, were popular among bootleggers which, according to John's producer, Gus Dudgeon, eventually prompted the record label to release it as an album. It has been said that the bootleg release of the entire 60-minute broadcast rather than the 48 minutes included in the official release significantly cut into the US sales of the live album. However, the entire concert was an 80-minute affair, and double-LPs containing the entire concert were more common than those containing only 60 minutes. Another contributing factor to the original album's soft sales could have been the glut of Elton John product on the market at the time. John also had in release two full studio albums (Elton John and Tumbleweed Connection) and a movie soundtrack (Friends) when the live LP was issued. Nonetheless, it became the fourth of John's records to simultaneously land in the top 100 of the Billboard 200, making him the first act to do so since The Beatles.

According to longtime New York City radio personality Dave Herman (who can be heard at the beginning and end of the album), John cut his hand at some point during the performance, and by the end of the show, the piano keys were covered with blood.

John and his band performed 13 songs during the radio broadcast. The original album included only six of the songs; a seventh, "Amoreena," appeared as a bonus track on the album's 1996 CD reissue. The other six performances remained officially unreleased until 2017. They were "I Need You to Turn To", "Your Song", "Country Comfort", "Border Song", "Indian Sunset" and "My Father's Gun".

Elton John has stated in several interviews that he believes that this recording is his best live performance. He has also cited the album as a great showcase for the musicianship of drummer Nigel Olsson and bassist Dee Murray. It is also the only officially released example of what John's live band sounded like prior to the arrival of guitarist Davey Johnstone, who was not a member until the release of Honky Château in 1972.

To commemorate the 10th Record Store Day, on 22 April 2017, John served as the first-ever worldwide Record Store Day Legend and released an expanded, double-vinyl version of the album. Retitled 17-11-70+, the release reinstates seven additional songs from the concert, making it the most complete official edition of the show available in any format. "Amoreena," previously available on the 1996 CD reissue, makes its first appearance on vinyl.

== Track listing ==
All songs by Elton John and Bernie Taupin, except where noted.

=== Original LP album ===
Side one
No.	Title	Writer(s)	Length
1.	"Take Me to the Pilot"		6:43
2.	"Honky Tonk Women"	Jagger–Richards	4:09
3.	"Sixty Years On"		8:05
4.	"Can I Put You On"		6:38

Side two
No.	Title	Length
1.	"Bad Side of the Moon"	4:30
2.	"Burn Down the Mission" including: "My Baby Left Me" (Arthur Crudup); "Get Back" (Lennon–McCartney)	18:20

=== 1995 Mercury and 1996 Rocket CD reissues ===
The 1996 Rocket Records edition changed the running order and added "Amoreena" as a bonus track. This version is also different from the earlier US releases in that album producer Gus Dudgeon remixed the tracks to create a notably different sound from the original US LP mixes. In addition to level changes, Dudgeon's version also added some echo and other effects not present in the earlier mixes.

No.	Title	Length
1.	"Bad Side of the Moon"	4:57
2.	"Amoreena" (on 1996 reissue only)	4:54
3.	"Take Me to the Pilot"	5:55
4.	"Sixty Years On"	7:22
5.	"Honky Tonk Women" (Mick Jagger/Keith Richards)	4:07
6.	"Can I Put You On"	6:38
7.	"Burn Down the Mission": "My Baby Left Me" (Arthur Crudup); "Get Back" (John Lennon/Paul McCartney)	18:27

=== 2017 Record Store Day 2-LP reissue ===
The 2017 Record Store Day special reissue features the six remained-unreleased songs from the concert, plus "Amoreena" (featured on the 1996 CD).

The track listing for the first two sides is the same as the original 1970 release.

Side three
No.	Title	Length
1.	"Indian Sunset"	6:44
2.	"Amoreena"	4:54
3.	"Your Song"	4:13

Side four
No.	Title	Length
1.	"Country Comfort"	5:00
2.	"I Need You to Turn To"	2:34
3.	"Border Song"	3:57
4.	"My Father's Gun"	5:13

== Full set list ==
1. "I Need You to Turn To"
2. "Your Song"
3. "Country Comfort"
4. "Border Song"
5. "Indian Sunset"
6. "Amoreena"
7. "Bad Side of the Moon"
8. "Take Me to the Pilot"
9. "Sixty Years On"
10. "Honky Tonk Women"
11. "Can I Put You On"
12. "Burn Down the Mission" (including "My Baby Left Me" & "Get Back")
13. "My Father's Gun" (encore)

Note

- An alternate version of the set list was presented on several 1970–1971 bootleg album issues of the concert. It presents a concert with a somewhat different flow, and although crossfades of the Uni/MCA/Mercury issues present applause where it did not occur in the original concert, the setlist as presented on these bootleg albums does seem to clear up a few problematic references in John's comments.
1. "I Need You to Turn To"
2. "Your Song"
3. "Bad Side of the Moon"
4. "Country Comfort"
5. "Can I Put You On"
6. "Border Song"
7. "Sixty Years On"
8. "Indian Sunset"
9. "Honky Tonk Women"
10. "Amoreena"
11. "Take Me to the Pilot"
12. "Burn Down the Mission" (including "My Baby Left Me" & "Get Back")
13. "My Father's Gun" (encore)

== Personnel ==
- Elton John – piano, lead vocals
- Dee Murray – bass, backing vocals
- Nigel Olsson – drums, backing vocals

Production

- Gus Dudgeon – producer
- Phil Ramone – recording engineer
- David Hentschel – reduction (mix) engineer (US LP)
- Clive Franks – reduction (mix) engineer (UK LP)
- Matt Howe – reduction (mix) engineer (Rocket reissue)
- Steve Brown – coordination
- Joe Disabato – coordination
- David Larkham – design, photography
- Gus Dudgeon – liner notes
- John Tobler – liner notes
- Dave Herman – emcee

== Charts ==
Chart (1971)	Peak position
Australian Albums (Kent Music Report)	20
Canada Top Albums/CDs (RPM)	10
UK Albums (Official Charts)	20
US Billboard 200	11

Chart (2017)	Peak position
Scottish Albums (Official Charts)	86
