= Two Rooms: Celebrating the Songs of Elton John & Bernie Taupin =

Compilation album by various artists
- Released: 14 October 1991
- Recorded: Various
- Genre: Rock
- Length: 78:54
- Label: Mercury; Polydor
- Producer: Various

Singles from Two Rooms
- 1. "Don't Let the Sun Go Down on Me" Released: September 1991; 2. "Rocket Man" b/w "Candle in the Wind" Released: November 1991

Professional ratings
Review scores
Source	Rating
AllMusic	2/5 stars
Chicago Tribune	2/4 stars
Philadelphia Inquirer	2/4 stars

Two Rooms: Celebrating the Songs of Elton John & Bernie Taupin is a tribute album consisting of interpretations of sixteen songs written by Elton John and Bernie Taupin, released on 14 October 1991 by Mercury Records in the UK and on 22 October by Polydor Records in the US. The title refers to a song on John's album 21 at 33, "Two Rooms at the End of the World", and to the duo's unusual collaborative style; it is also the title of a 1991 film of the same title documenting their collaboration.

== Critical reception ==
The album gained an uneven reception, though some performances were singled out for praise, including Sinéad O'Connor's interpretation of "Sacrifice", Kate Bush's reggae-inflected version of "Rocket Man" (which won The Observer readers' award for greatest cover of all time in 2007), and Tina Turner's version of "The Bitch Is Back", which was nominated for Best Female Rock Vocal Performance at the 35th Annual Grammy Awards.

== Singles ==
Two singles were released from the album: Oleta Adams' version of "Don't Let the Sun Go Down on Me" peaked at number 33 on the UK singles chart and Kate Bush's "Rocket Man" peaked at number 12 in the UK and number two in Australia (where it beat the original version's chart position by several places). The B-side of Bush's single was her version of "Candle in the Wind". The CD single added an instrumental version of the same song. Wilson Phillips' cover of "Daniel", while not released as a single, peaked at number seven in the US Adult Contemporary chart due to strong radio airplay.

== Track listing ==
All tracks are written by Elton John and Bernie Taupin.

No.	Title	Performing artist	Length
1.	"Border Song"	Eric Clapton	4:21
2.	"Rocket Man (I Think It's Going to Be a Long, Long Time)"	Kate Bush	4:57
3.	"Come Down in Time"	Sting	3:38
4.	"Saturday Night's Alright for Fighting" ( (Note: The Who include a passage of "Take Me to the Pilot" in their cover of the song.))	The Who	4:32
5.	"Crocodile Rock"	The Beach Boys	4:21
6.	"Daniel"	Wilson Phillips	4:03
7.	"Sorry Seems to Be the Hardest Word"	Joe Cocker	3:57
8.	"Levon"	Jon Bon Jovi	5:27
9.	"The Bitch Is Back"	Tina Turner	3:38
10.	"Philadelphia Freedom"	Hall & Oates	5:12
11.	"Your Song"	Rod Stewart	4:49
12.	"Don't Let the Sun Go Down on Me"	Oleta Adams	6:02
13.	"Madman Across the Water"	Bruce Hornsby	6:10
14.	"Sacrifice"	Sinéad O'Connor	5:12
15.	"Burn Down the Mission"	Phil Collins	6:11
16.	"Tonight"	George Michael	7:23
Total length:			78:54

== Companion film ==
Two versions of a documentary, also titled Two Rooms: Celebrating the Songs of Elton John & Bernie Taupin, exist. The first was released internationally on VHS video with a running time of ninety minutes. The other aired on ABC television in 1992 as a one-hour special and featured a slightly different edit and contents. The television version was hosted by Sylvester Stallone. Stallone does not appear on the VHS version. Bruce Hornsby, George Michael, Hall & Oates and Oleta Adams appear in the television version but not the VHS version.

== Charts ==
=== Weekly charts ===
Weekly chart performance for Two Rooms
Chart (1991–1992)	Peak position
Australian Compilations (ARIA)	15
Austrian Compilations (Ö3 Austria)	5
Dutch Compilations (MegaCharts)	13
French Compilations (IFOP)	18
Swedish Compilations (Topplistan)	31
Swiss Compilations (Schweizer Hitparade)	2
US Billboard 200	18

=== Year-end charts ===
Year-end chart performance for Two Rooms
Chart (1992)	Position
US Billboard 200	49

== Certifications ==
Certifications for Two Rooms
Region	Certification	Certified units/sales
Australia (ARIA)	Platinum	70,000^{^}
Canada (Music Canada)	Platinum	100,000^{^}
France (SNEP)	Gold	100,000^{*}
New Zealand (RMNZ)	Platinum	15,000^{^}
Spain (Promusicae)	Gold	50,000^{^}
United Kingdom (BPI)	Platinum	300,000^{^}
United States (RIAA)	Platinum	1,000,000^{^}
^{*} Sales figures based on certification alone.^{^} Shipments figures based on certification alone.

== See also ==
- Revamp & Restoration
