= Friends (Elton John song) =

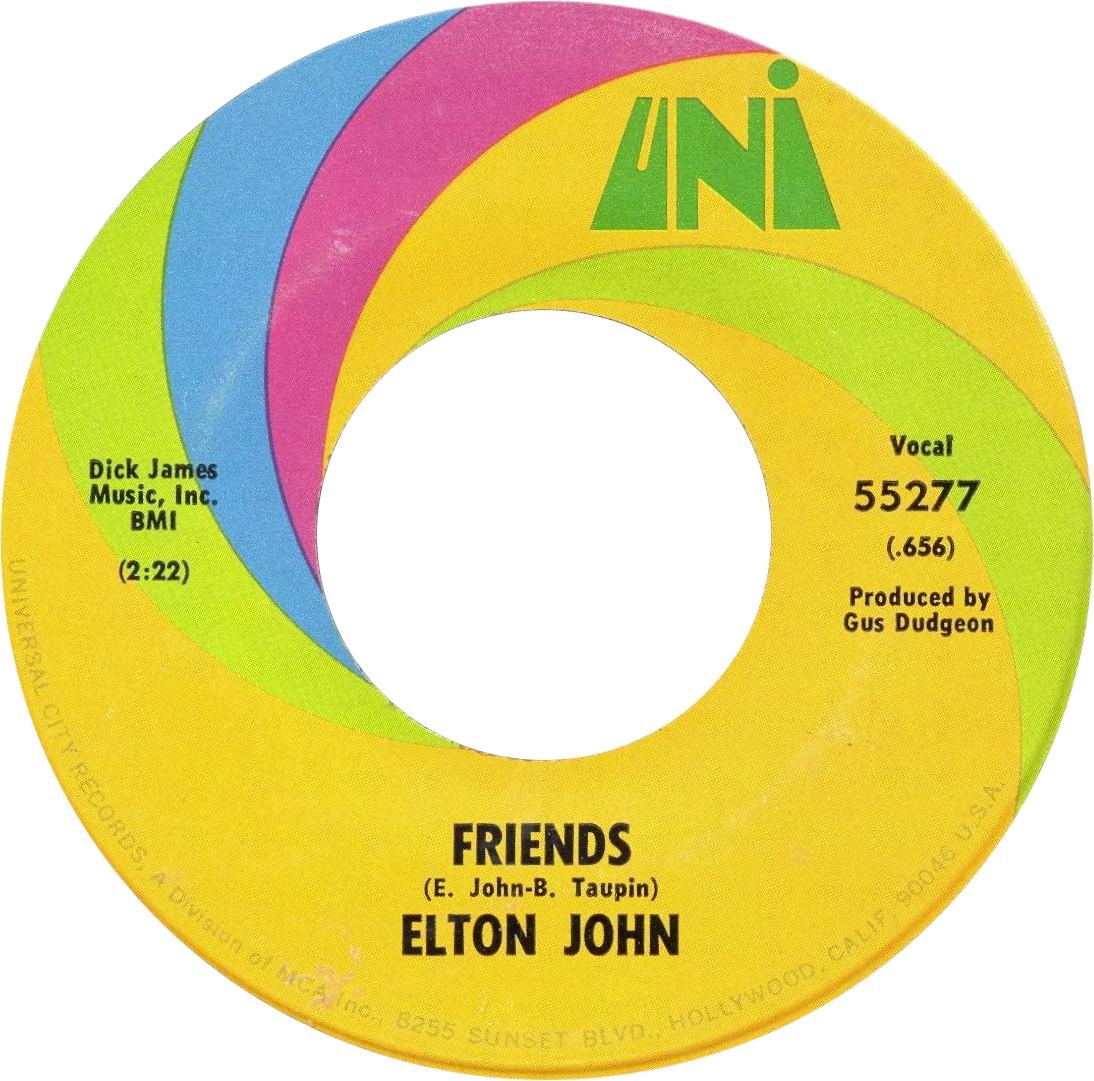
- One of side-A labels of the US single

Single by Elton John

from the album Friends
- B-side: "Honey Roll"
- Released: 10 March 1971
- Recorded: September 1970
- Genre: Pop
- Length: 2:22
- Label: Uni
- Songwriters: Elton John; Bernie Taupin
- Producer: Gus Dudgeon

Elton John singles chronology
"Your Song" (1970)	"Friends" (1971)	"Levon" (1971)

"Friends" is a song written by British musician Elton John and lyricist Bernie Taupin, and performed by John. It was John's third U.S. hit, and his second to reach Top 40 after the breakthrough success of "Your Song".

The song rose to number 34 on the U.S. Billboard Hot 100 and number 17 on the Cash Box Top 100. On the Canadian singles chart "Friends" peaked at number 13. "Friends" also became a medium hit on the Adult Contemporary charts of both nations.

== Background ==
"Friends" was not the follow-up single to "Your Song," but was rather the title track and theme song from the movie Friends starring Sean Bury, and was included on the soundtrack. It was the only hit single from the LP. The most recent performance of "Friends" was in 1999.

== Reception ==
Cash Box described the song as lacking "the effortless commercial magnetism of 'Your Song.'" Record World called it "another performance to be remembered, cherished and charted."

== Chart performance ==
Chart (1971)	Peak position
Australia (Kent Music Report)	96
Canada RPM Top Singles	13
Canada RPM Adult Contemporary	25
France	12
Italy Charts	5
New Zealand (Listener)	19
US Billboard Hot 100	34
US Billboard Easy Listening	17
US Cash Box Top 100	17
