= Madman Across the Water (song) =

Song by Elton John

from the album Madman Across the Water
- Released: 5 November 1971
- Genre: Pop
- Length: 5:57
- Label: Uni; DJM
- Songwriters: Elton John; Bernie Taupin
- Producer: Gus Dudgeon

Music video
- "Madman Across the Water (BBC Sounds for Saturday 1971)" on YouTube

"Madman Across the Water" is a song by British singer and songwriter Elton John from his 1971 album of the same name. Since its release in 1971, it has been considered one of John's best songs.

== Background ==
"Madman Across the Water" was recorded in four days. It was scheduled to be five, however, according to John in his memoir Me, "[W]e lost a day because of Paul Buckmaster. He stayed up the night before the sessions began to finish the arrangements — I suspect with a certain amount of chemical assistance — then managed to knock a bottle of ink all over the only score, ruining it. I was furious. It was an expensive mistake to make, and we stopped working together for decades afterwards. But I was also quietly impressed when he wrote the whole score again, in twenty-four hours. Even when Paul screwed up, he screwed up in a way that reminded you he was a genius." A version of the song with only acoustic instruments and Michael Chapman was recorded, but never released.

== Composition and lyrics ==
"Madman Across the Water" tells the story of a man who is supposedly in a mental institution located on a shore, and doesn't know if he belongs there or not. Many critics and fans have speculated that the song is about either the 37th president of the United States of America, Richard Nixon, or German dictator Adolf Hitler. Although many believe it is about Nixon, Bernie Taupin denied it, stating "Back in the seventies, when people were saying that 'Madman Across the Water' was about Richard Nixon, I thought, That is genius. I could never have thought of that."

== Release and reception ==
"Madman Across the Water" was released as the closing track of side one on the album of the same name, and has since been considered to be one of John's best songs. Vulture critic Shana Naomi Krochmal ranked it number four in her ranking of all 388 of John's songs in 2023 for Vulture, believing that it is "Both a seeming reflection of criticism of John’s focus on American tours and audiences over his fans at home — and in some ways a premeditated manifestation of a backlash for those choices" Rolling Stone critic Will Hermes ranked it number 9 in his ranking of John's 50 best songs for Rolling Stone, praising the song's "tasty acoustic-guitar harmonics of Davey Johnstone" and called the song Madman Across the Water's "musical tour de force". When ranking John's 50 best songs for the Guardian, Dave Simpson ranked it number 26, stating that John "describes this musically complex album title track as "one of Bernie Taupin's eeriest lyrics" – it's certainly odd, written from the mindset of a lad gone insane." American Songwriter critic Jim Beviglia placed it at number 1 when ranking the 5 five best songs on Madman Across the Water, stating that it is "undoubtedly one of the finest achievements of John’s recording career" and praised it by saying "His ability to bring this character to life in almost harrowing fashion shouldn’t be underestimated." while noting it "evokes a man on the run from his demons in startlingly efficient fashion." Lindsay Palmer likened it in a review for AllMusic to "The King Must Die" from John's eponymous debut album.

An alternate recording appears on the 1995 CD reissue of Tumbleweed Connection. A previously unreleased version claiming to be the original version from May 1970 was included on the 1992 compilation Rare Masters.

== Live performance ==
"Madman" was the fourth song John played during his Madison Square Garden performance on 16 March 2011. According to the New York Times, he didn't rush the performance, improvising for about five minutes.

== Personnel ==
Personnel are adapted from the liner notes of Madman Across the Water.

- Elton John – vocals, piano
- Davey Johnstone – acoustic guitar
- Chris Spedding – electric guitar
- Diana Lewis – ARP synthesizer
- Rick Wakeman – organ
- Paul Buckmaster – orchestra
- Herbie Flowers – bass
- Terry Cox – drums
- Ray Cooper – percussion
