= Madman Across the Water =

1971 album by Elton John

Studio album by Elton John
- Released: 5 November 1971
- Recorded: 27 February; 9, 11, 14 August 1971
- Studios: Trident, London
- Genre: Progressive rock
- Length: 45:17
- Labels: Uni; DJM
- Producer: Gus Dudgeon

Elton John chronology
17-11-70 (1971)	Madman Across the Water (1971)	Honky Château (1972)

Singles from Madman Across the Water
- 1. "Levon" Released: 29 November 1971; 2. "Tiny Dancer" Released: 7 February 1972

Madman Across the Water is the fourth studio album by British musician Elton John, released on 5 November 1971 by DJM and Uni Records. The album was his third album to be released in 1971, at which point John had been rising to prominence as a popular music artist. John's first progressive rock album, Madman Across the Water contains nine tracks, each composed and performed by John and with lyrics written by songwriting partner Bernie Taupin. Yes keyboardist Rick Wakeman plays Hammond organ on two songs.

There were two singles released from Madman Across the Water, "Levon" and "Tiny Dancer". The album was certified gold by the RIAA in February 1972, followed by platinum in March 1993, 2× platinum in August 1998, and 3× platinum in December 2024. The album was included in Robert Dimery's 1001 Albums You Must Hear Before You Die. On 10 June 2022, the album was reissued as a deluxe edition for its 50th anniversary, featuring 18 unreleased tracks including demos, outtakes and alternate takes, as well as a 40-page book detailing the album's creation with notes from John and Taupin.

== History ==
The nine tracks were each composed and performed by John and with lyrics written by songwriting partner Bernie Taupin as with his previous material. Like John's other studio albums up to this point, only one song on Madman featured John's touring band (which consisted of bassist Dee Murray and drummer Nigel Olsson), due to producer Gus Dudgeon's lack of faith in the group for studio recordings. Instead, most of the tracks were backed by studio players and string arrangements put together by Paul Buckmaster. Davey Johnstone, who had previously worked with Dudgeon as a part of Magna Carta, was also put on as the main guitarist.

Johnstone, Murray and Olsson would be fully featured on John's next album, Honky Château. Percussionist and later band member Ray Cooper made his first appearance with this album, which was John's last to be recorded at London's Trident Studios, although subsequent albums would be remixed or overdubbed there. Caleb Quaye and Roger Pope would not play with John again until Rock of the Westies in 1975, following Murray and Olsson's departure from the band.

=== Title ===
The album's title song was initially set to be released on John's previous album, Tumbleweed Connection, featuring guitarist Mick Ronson; however, that version was set aside and the song was re-recorded for this album, with Johnstone on guitar. The earlier version was included on the remastered Tumbleweed Connection compact disc.

Dispelling rumours that the song's lyric referred to then US President Richard Nixon, Bernie Taupin had this to say:

Back in the seventies, when people were saying that "Madman Across the Water" was about Richard Nixon, I thought, That is genius. I could never have thought of that.

=== Album artwork ===
The album cover for Madman Across the Water was embroidered over two weeks by Janis Larkham, wife of the album art director David Larkham. She used the back of an old Levi's jacket, and the original was gifted to John. There was no initial run of expensive album covers with similar embroidery, nor embossed versions; it was flat printed, though it did include a lavish booklet. Janis chose to credit herself as "Yanis" for this artwork.

== Reception ==
Professional ratings
Review scores
Source	Rating
AllMusic	4.5/5 stars
Christgau's Record Guide	C
The Encyclopedia of Popular Music	3/5 stars
Tom Hull – on the Web	B−

Madman Across the Water was one of John's lowest-charting album efforts. It continued a streak of mediocre performance in the UK for John, peaking at No. 41 on the UK Albums Chart and spending two weeks there. The album fared much better in North America, peaking at No. 8 on the US Billboard Top Pop Albums and later on at No. 10 on the year-end list of 1972.

The album was certified Gold by the RIAA in February 1972, achieving $1 million in sales at wholesale value just in the United States. In 1993, the album was certified Platinum, representing shipments of more than one million units in the US. In 1998, the album was certified Multi-Platinum, representing shipments of over two million units in the US. In May 2017 the album was certified Silver for sales of 60,000 units by the British Phonographic Industry.

On release, Alex Dubro of Rolling Stone was not especially enthusiastic about the album and found it inferior to its two predecessors. Although he commended "Tiny Dancer" and "Levon", he found the lyrics throughout the record confusing, concluding that it is a "difficult, sometimes impossibly dense record" that would not upset John's current fans, but not gain new ones either. Penny Valentine in Sounds magazine was more positive, describing John as "a music man of immense feeling and power" and full of unexplored talent.

When it was released in The Classic Years collection, it was the first album not to feature any bonus tracks. One known track recorded at the time, "Rock Me When He's Gone", was released on the 1992 compilation Rare Masters. The song was written for and recorded by one of John's long-time friends, Long John Baldry. It was later remastered for the 50th anniversary deluxe edition.

Madman was John's first foray into progressive rock, and it did not sell well. His next album, Honky Château, shifted gears to glam rock, beginning a string of more successful releases. He did not touch upon prog rock again until Blue Moves in 1976, another less popular album. Madman was helped in North America by FM radio deejays willing to play the lengthy singles, unlike BBC Radio 1.

== Covers ==
Alice in Chains member Jerry Cantrell covered the album's closing track, "Goodbye", for his third solo album, Brighten. He told Wall of Sound that John gave him his approval for his rendition, revealing he said, "Absolutely you should put it on the record. You got my permission. You did a great version."

== Track listing ==
=== Original release ===
All tracks are written by Elton John and Bernie Taupin.

Side one
No.	Title	Length
1.	"Tiny Dancer"	6:17
2.	"Levon"	5:22
3.	"Razor Face"	4:42
4.	"Madman Across the Water"	5:57

Side two
No.	Title	Length
5.	"Indian Sunset"	6:47
6.	"Holiday Inn"	4:17
7.	"Rotten Peaches"	4:58
8.	"All the Nasties"	5:09
9.	"Goodbye"	1:49
Total length:		45:18

Note

- The SACD version of the album contained a longer version of "Razor Face", which extended the song-ending jam to 6:42 instead of the early fade on the original album. This extended version can only be heard in the 5.1 surround mix, or on the 50th Anniversary reissue of the album.

=== 50th Anniversary Deluxe Edition ===
Disc one - 2016 Bob Ludwig Remaster
No.	Title	Length
1.	"Tiny Dancer"	6:15
2.	"Levon"	5:20
3.	"Razor Face"	4:41
4.	"Madman Across The Water"	5:57
5.	"Indian Sunset"	6:44
6.	"Holiday Inn"	4:15
7.	"Rotten Peaches"	4:55
8.	"All the Nasties"	5:07
9.	"Goodbye"	1:46
10.	"Indian Sunset" (Live Radio Broadcast)	5:17
11.	"Madman Across the Water" (Original Version, featuring Mick Ronson)	8:50
12.	"Rock Me When He's Gone"	5:01
13.	"Levon" (Mono Single Version)	4:44
14.	"Razor Face" (Extended Version)	6:43
Total length:		75:35

Note

- The live radio broadcast of "Indian Sunset" is from November 17, 1970, and edits out the last verse of the song. The full version of the song (without John's intro) is on the expanded edition of 11-17-70+.

Disc two
No.	Title	Length
1.	"Madman Across the Water" (1970 Piano Demo)	5:07
2.	"Tiny Dancer" (Piano Demo)	6:00
3.	"Levon" (Piano Demo)	5:03
4.	"Razor Face" (Piano Demo)	3:45
5.	"Madman Across the Water" (1971 Piano Demo)	5:11
6.	"Indian Sunset" (Piano Demo)	7:33
7.	"Holiday Inn" (Piano Demo)	4:32
8.	"Rotten Peaches" (Piano Demo)	4:06
9.	"All the Nasties" (Piano Demo)	4:47
10.	"Goodbye" (Piano Demo)	1:58
11.	"Rock Me When He's Gone" (Piano Demo)	4:01
12.	"Rock Me When He's Gone" (Full Version)	7:11
Total length:		59:14

Disc three - BBC Sounds for Saturday
No.	Title	Length
1.	"Tiny Dancer"	6:11
2.	"Rotten Peaches"	5:10
3.	"Razor Face"	4:21
4.	"Holiday Inn"	3:55
5.	"Indian Sunset"	6:59
6.	"Levon"	4:57
7.	"Madman Across the Water"	10:55
8.	"Goodbye"	1:39
Total length:		44:07

== Personnel ==
Track numbers refer to CD and digital releases of the album.

- Elton John – vocals, acoustic piano
- Brian Dee – harmonium (2)
- Rick Wakeman – Hammond organ (3 & 7)
- Jack Emblow – accordion (3)
- Diana Lewis – ARP synthesizer (4, 7)
- Caleb Quaye – electric guitar (1, 2, 3), acoustic guitar (6)
- B. J. Cole – steel guitar (1)
- Davey Johnstone – acoustic guitar (1, 4, 7), mandolin (6), sitar (6)
- Chris Spedding – electric guitar (4), slide guitar (7)
- David Glover – bass guitar (1, 3, 6)
- Brian Odgers – bass guitar (2)
- Herbie Flowers – bass guitar (4, 5, 7)
- Chris Laurence – double bass (5)
- Dee Murray – bass guitar (8), backing vocals (1, 6, 7)
- Roger Pope – drums (1, 3, 6)
- Barry Morgan – drums (2)
- Terry Cox – drums (4, 5, 7)
- Nigel Olsson – drums (8), backing vocals (1, 6, 7)
- Ray Cooper – percussion (4), tambourine (7, 8)
- Paul Buckmaster – orchestral arrangements and conductor (1, 2, 4, 5, 6, 8, 9)
- David Katz – orchestra contractor (1, 2, 4, 5, 6, 8, 9)
- Tony Burrows – backing vocals (1, 6, 7)
- Roger Cook – backing vocals (1, 6, 7)
- Lesley Duncan – backing vocals (1, 6, 7)
- Barry St. John – backing vocals (1, 6, 7)
- Terry Steele – backing vocals (1, 6, 7)
- Liza Strike – backing vocals (1, 6, 7)
- Sue and Sunny – backing vocals (1, 6, 7)
- Cantores em Ecclesia Choir – choir (8)
- Robert Kirby – choir director (5, 8)

Technical

- Gus Dudgeon – producer, liner notes
- Robin Geoffrey Cable – engineer
- Tony Cousins – remastering
- Gus Skinas – editing SACD release
- Ricky Graham – digital transfers
- Greg Penny – surround mix
- Crispin Murray – assistant
- David Larkham – art direction, design, illustrations, photography, cover photo
- Gill – artwork
- Yanis – artwork
- Bob Gruen – photography
- John Tobler – liner notes

== Charts ==
=== Weekly charts ===
Chart (1972)	Peak position
Australian Albums (Kent Music Report)	8
Canada Top Albums/CDs (RPM)	9
Italian Albums (Musica e Dischi)	14
Japanese Albums (Oricon)	13
Spanish Albums (Spanish Albums Chart)	11
UK Albums (Official Charts)	41
US Billboard 200	8

2022 chart performance for Madman Across the Water
Chart (2022)	Peak position
Belgian Albums (Ultratop Flanders)	159
Belgian Albums (Ultratop Wallonia)	112
German Albums (Offizielle Top 100)	32
Scottish Albums (Official Charts)	7
Swiss Albums (Schweizer Hitparade)	53
UK Albums (Official Charts)	53

=== Year-end charts ===
Chart (1972)	Position
U.S. Top Pop Albums	10

== Certifications ==
Region	Certification	Certified units/sales
Australia (ARIA)	Gold	20,000^{^}
Canada (Music Canada)	Platinum	100,000^{^}
United Kingdom (BPI) original release	Gold	100,000^{^}
United Kingdom (BPI) sales since 1993	Silver	60,000^{‡}
United States (RIAA)	3× Platinum	3,000,000^{^}
^{^} Shipments figures based on certification alone.^{‡} Sales+streaming figures based on certification alone.
