= Indian Sunset =

Song by Elton John

from the album Madman Across the Water
- Released: 5 November 1971
- Recorded: 14 August 1971
- Studio: DJM Studios
- Genre: Progressive rock
- Length: 6:45
- Label: DJM
- Songwriter(s): Elton John; Bernie Taupin
- Producer(s): Gus Dudgeon

"Indian Sunset" is a song written by British musician Elton John and lyricist Bernie Taupin, and performed by John. It was released on John's 1971 album Madman Across the Water.

== Background ==
It's a story, it's not a protest song, which many people think it seems to be.

— John before performing the song at BBC studios

The song chronicles the story of an unnamed American Indian warrior on the verge of defeat from the white man. Taupin was inspired to write the lyrics after seeing the Frederic Remington painting, "The Scout: Friends or Foes?". It contains numerous inaccuracies, most notably the line about Geronimo being shot by U.S soldiers. In reality, the Apache warrior died of pneumonia at the age of 79. Also, the Native narrator in the song suggests in different verses that he is both Iroquois and Sioux, although those two tribes lived a thousand miles apart.

John told Rolling Stone in 2011 that this song was one of his favourites to play live: "I do 'Indian Sunset' with Ray Cooper. Nobody knows that song at all, it's an obscure track from Madman Across the Water, and it gets a standing ovation every night. It's a six-minute movie in a song."

== Sampling ==
In 2004, the song was sampled in an Eminem-produced Tupac Shakur song entitled "Ghetto Gospel". It topped the charts in United Kingdom, Australia, Czech Republic, Ireland, and Scotland. It also become a Top Ten and Top 20 hit on some countries.
