= Tumbleweed Connection =

Studio album by Elton John
- Released: 30 October 1970
- Recorded: March 1970
- Studios: Trident, London
- Genres: Roots rock; blues rock; pop rock; soul; country rock; Americana
- Length: 46:56
- Labels: Uni (US); DJM (UK)
- Producer: Gus Dudgeon

Elton John chronology
Elton John (1970)	Tumbleweed Connection (1970)	Friends (1971)

Tumbleweed Connection is the third studio album by the British singer-songwriter Elton John. It was recorded at Trident Studios, London, in March 1970, and released in October 1970 in the UK and January 1971 in the US. It is a concept album based on country and western and Americana themes. All songs are written by John and Bernie Taupin, with the exception of "Love Song" by Lesley Duncan.

In 2012, Tumbleweed Connection was ranked number 458 on Rolling Stone magazine's list of the 500 greatest albums of all time. The album peaked at number two on the UK Albums Chart and number five on the US Billboard 200 chart. In the US, it was certified gold in March 1971 and platinum in August 1998 by the RIAA.

== Background ==
Co-writer Bernie Taupin said of the album, "Everybody thinks that I was influenced by Americana and by seeing America first hand, but we wrote and recorded the album before we'd even been to the States. It was totally influenced by The Band's album Music From Big Pink and Robbie Robertson's songs. I've always loved Americana, and I loved American Westerns. I've always said that "El Paso" was the song that made me want to write songs, it was the perfect meshing of melody and storyline, and I thought that here was something that married rhythms and the written word completely." John has remarked, "Lyrically and melodically, that's probably one of our most perfect albums. I don't think there's any song on there that doesn't melodically fit the lyric."

Basic tracks for three of the album's titles, "Come Down in Time", "Country Comfort" and "Burn Down the Mission", were recorded at Trident during the sessions for the previous LP, Elton John, with overdubs completed for Tumbleweed Connection. An early version of "Madman Across the Water", featuring Mick Ronson on electric guitar, was also recorded during the sessions for the album. It was released on several albums and reissues of Tumbleweed Connection, though the track was ultimately re-recorded for the Madman Across the Water album.

Dee Murray and Nigel Olsson appear for the first time together on this album as the rhythm section on "Amoreena". Olsson had played on one track on Empty Sky for John in 1969. It is Murray's first appearance on an Elton John album. In addition to several studio players who also performed on John's previous self-titled second album, several tracks feature backing musicians from the band Hookfoot, who were also his DJM Records label mates. Hookfoot guitarist Caleb Quaye and drummer Roger Pope had also appeared on John's Empty Sky album.

No singles were released from the album in the US by either DJM or John's US distributor, Universal Records, but "Country Comfort" (b/w "Love Song") was released as a single in Australia, New Zealand and Brazil. It peaked at No. 15 in New Zealand, and did not chart in the other two territories it was released in.

== Artwork ==
The wraparound cover photo for the album was taken at Sheffield Park railway station in Sussex, approximately 30 miles (50 km) south of London on the Bluebell Railway. Photographer Ian Digby Ovens captured John (seated to the right in the photo but appearing to the left on the front cover, shown above) and Taupin (standing to the left, on the back cover) in front of the late-nineteenth-century station, to represent the album's rural Americana concept despite the English location. Additional photos were taken from the interior of a train on the line for the album liner notes and libretto.

In August 2020, the Bluebell Railway announced that, to mark the 50th anniversary of the release of the album, it had restored the station to look as it did when the cover photo was taken, giving people an opportunity to re-create the scene in their own photos.

== Reception ==
Professional ratings
Review scores
Source	Rating
AllMusic	5/5 stars
Christgau's Record Guide	B−
Q	3/5 stars
Rolling Stone	(mixed) (deluxe edition)
The Rolling Stone Album Guide	3/5 stars
Uncut	4/5 stars
The Village Voice	C+
Yahoo! Music	(favourable)
Encyclopedia of Popular Music	5/5 stars

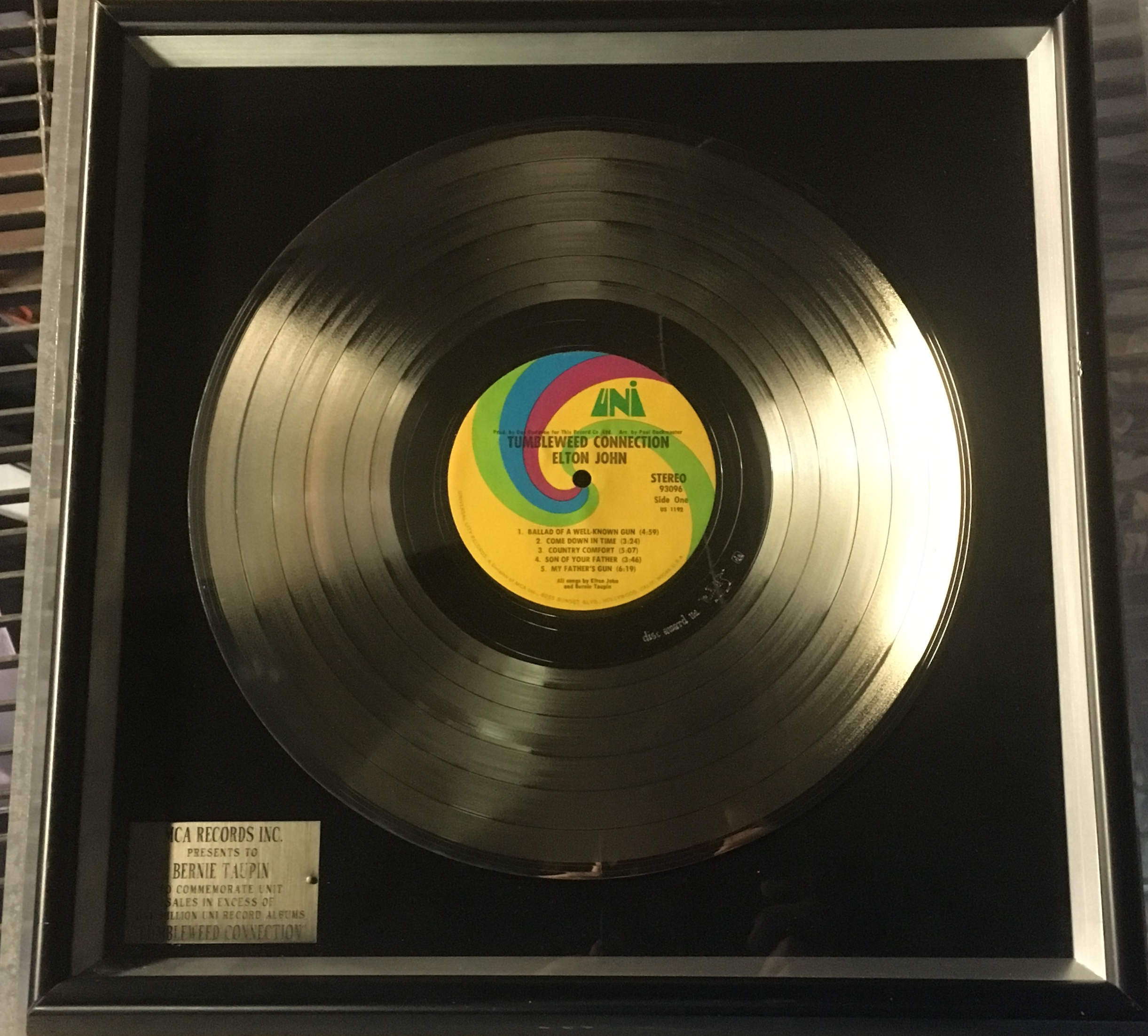
Tumbleweed Connection Platinum Record

The album peaked at number two on the UK Albums Chart and number five on the US Billboard 200 chart. In the US, it was certified gold in March 1971 and platinum in August 1998 by the RIAA. The album sold very quickly in the US, debuting at number 28 on Billboard's Top LPs, an unusually high debut for a new artist at the time, and reached its peak position in just four weeks.

In 2012, Tumbleweed Connection was ranked number 458 on Rolling Stone magazine's list of the 500 greatest albums of all time.

=== Critical reception ===
Reviewing later for AllMusic, Stephen Thomas Erlewine wrote: "Half of the songs don't follow conventional pop song structures; instead, they flow between verses and vague choruses. These experiments are remarkably successful, primarily because Taupin's lyrics are evocative and John's melodic sense is at its best."

Robert Christgau wrote in his 1981 Record Guide: "good melodies and bad Westerns on it. Why do people believe that these latter qualify as songpoems?" (Note: There's an earlier Christgau review of the album, written in 1970 for The Village Voice). Reviewing for Rolling Stone, David Fricke wrote: "1971's Tumbleweed Connection needs no improvement; it is one of the best country-rock albums ever written by London cowboys."

Robert Hillburn wrote for The Los Angeles Times: "Tumbleweed Connection is that near-perfect album that artists often spend a whole career trying to produce." Dave DiMartino wrote for Yahoo! Music: "A step up from the slightly more overtly commercial Elton John... Tumbleweed is beautifully recorded and filled with very fine songs... Bordering on classic status." In The Rough Guide to Rock (1999), Neil Patrick wrote that the album highlighted John and Taupin's "shared obsession with Wild West mythology", and deemed it the best of the three albums John released in 1970. Martin C. Strong, writing in The Great Rock Discography (2006), considers the album a "relatively successful attempt at retro Americana".

In an overview of John's career, Andy Gill of The Word deemed the album "a full-bore paean to a forgotten America" clearly inspired by the Band's first two albums, but added that "credit should be given for the way that the swamp-rock sound of 'Ballad Of A Well Known Gun' and 'Son Of Your Father', with its braiding of disparate guitar and piano lines in rhythmic symbiosis, paralleled the contemporary work of real Americans like Ry Cooder and Little Feat." New Musical Express contributor Charles Shaar Murray opined that the record "mined some new ore, and explored a few new things", with Taupin's love of the Band reflected in the lyrics' preoccupation with "the Old West, full of images of guns, fathers, stagecoaches, plantations and the like"; he added: "Buckmaster's orchestrations were played down, and the band worked overtime and really got funky. Apart from Lesley Duncan's 'Love Song', it was virtually raunch all the way, with some really sweet touches carefully placed en route."

== "Burn Down the Mission" ==
"Burn Down the Mission", the tenth and final track on Tumbleweed Connection, is the most enduring and frequently played song from the album, the only one played by John on his Farewell Yellow Brick Road Tour in 2022–23. It was one of the very few non-singles on the Farewell Tour setlist, being played every night.

=== Song information ===
"Burn Down the Mission" is musically driven by the story told by Bernie Taupin's lyrics, as is common in John/Taupin collaborations.

In the premiere episode of Elvis Costello's show Spectacle, John cited Laura Nyro as an influence on, among other things, the unusual structure and rhythm changes of this song in particular.

John has frequently performed it live over the last 40 years:

- John's first live album, the WABC-FM radio broadcast 11-17-70, concludes with a version (running 18:10), interpolating Elvis Presley's "My Baby Left Me" and the Beatles' "Get Back"
- The song was a regular feature of the 1974 US and UK tours, with a version from the Royal Variety Performance in London, included in the album Here and There
- John's longest and most complex standalone jam of "Burn Down the Mission" (lasting 10:17) was in the Christmas Eve 1974 performance broadcast live on the BBC from Hammersmith Odeon in London, much bootlegged as Ol' Pink Eyes Is Back and Just Like Strange Rain (listen here at timecode 9:43).
- A more conventional rendition was recorded in December 1986 and released on Live in Australia with the Melbourne Symphony Orchestra.

=== Cover versions ===
- In 1991, "Burn Down the Mission" was covered by Phil Collins for the tribute album Two Rooms: Celebrating the Songs of Elton John & Bernie Taupin.
- In 2002, "Burn Down the Mission" was recorded by Toto for their album Through the Looking Glass.

== "Country Comfort" ==
"Country Comfort" was featured on Rod Stewart's second solo album Gasoline Alley which was actually recorded and released shortly before Tumbleweed Connection. John's and Stewart's versions were released as singles, but neither single charted. In later years, the song has been covered by Juice Newton, Keith Urban, Earl Scruggs, the Clancy Brothers and Kate Taylor, amongst others.

== "Amoreena" ==
"Amoreena" was featured in Sidney Lumet's 1975 film Dog Day Afternoon, playing out of the getaway car's radio during the opening scene. The footage shot for the scene by Lumet was silent, as he had decided he did not want a score for the film. He felt that "he could not reconcile trying to convince an audience that this really happened ... with putting a music score into it". However, Lumet added "Amoreena" to the film after editor Dede Allen played it in the editing room.

== Track listing ==
All tracks are written by Elton John and Bernie Taupin, except where noted.

Side one
No.	Title	Length
1.	"Ballad of a Well-Known Gun"	4:59
2.	"Come Down in Time"	3:25
3.	"Country Comfort"	5:06
4.	"Son of Your Father"	3:48
5.	"My Father's Gun"	6:20

Side two
No.	Title	Length
6.	"Where to Now St. Peter?"	4:11
7.	"Love Song" (Lesley Duncan)	3:41
8.	"Amoreena"	5:00
9.	"Talking Old Soldiers"	4:06
10.	"Burn Down the Mission"	6:21
Total length:		46:56

Bonus tracks (1995 Mercury and 2001 Rocket reissue)
No.	Title	Length
11.	"Into the Old Man's Shoes"	4:02
12.	"Madman Across the Water" (Original version, featuring Mick Ronson)	8:50
Total length:		59:48

2008 Deluxe edition bonus disc
No.	Title	Length
1.	"There Goes a Well Known Gun" (Previously unreleased band demo)	3:27
2.	"Come Down in Time" (Piano demo)	3:39
3.	"Country Comfort" (Piano demo)	4:12
4.	"Son of Your Father" (Previously unreleased piano demo)	4:12
5.	"Talking Old Soldiers" (Piano demo)	4:13
6.	"Into the Old Man's Shoes" (Piano demo)	3:40
7.	"Sister of the Cross" (Piano demo)	4:38
8.	"Madman Across the Water" (Original version, featuring Mick Ronson)	8:50
9.	"Into the Old Man's Shoes"	4:02
10.	"My Father's Gun" (BBC session)	3:43
11.	"Ballad of a Well-Known Gun" (BBC session)	4:36
12.	"Burn Down the Mission" (BBC session)	6:52
13.	"Amoreena" (BBC session)	5:12
Total length:		59:16

== Personnel ==
Track numbers refer to CD and digital releases of the album.

=== Musicians ===
- Elton John – lead vocals, acoustic piano (1, 3–6, 8–10), Hammond organ (8), backing vocals (10)
- Brian Dee – Hammond organ (10, 13)
- Caleb Quaye – lead guitar (1, 4, 6, 8), acoustic guitar (1, 3, 5, 6), electric guitar (5)
- Les Thatcher – acoustic guitar (2, 10), 12-string acoustic guitar (3)
- Gordon Huntley – steel guitar (3)
- Lesley Duncan – backing vocals (1, 4, 5, 7), acoustic guitar (7)
- Mike Egan – acoustic guitar (10)
- Dave Glover – bass guitar (1, 4–6)
- Herbie Flowers – bass guitar (2, 3, 10)
- Chris Laurence – acoustic bass (2, 10)
- Dee Murray – backing vocals (3, 6), bass guitar (8)
- Roger Pope – drums (1, 4–6), percussion (1)
- Barry Morgan – drums (2, 3, 10)
- Nigel Olsson – backing vocals (3, 6), drums (8)
- Robin Jones – congas (10), tambourine (10)
- Karl Jenkins – oboe (2)
- Skaila Kanga – harp (2)
- Ian Duck – harmonica (3, 4)
- Johnny Van Derek – violin (3)
- Paul Buckmaster – orchestral arrangements and conductor
- Madeline Bell – backing vocals (1, 4, 5)
- Tony Burrows – backing vocals (1, 5)
- Kay Garner – backing vocals (1, 4, 5)
- Tony Hazzard – backing vocals (1, 5)
- Dusty Springfield – backing vocals (1, 5)
- Tammi Hunt – backing vocals (4)
- Heather Wheatman – backing vocals (4)
- Yvonne Wheatman – backing vocals (4)

=== Production ===
- Gus Dudgeon – producer
- Robin Geoffrey Cable – engineer
- Gus Skinas – editing SACD release
- Ricky Graham – digital transfers
- Greg Penny – surround mix 5.1 & Dolby Atmos Mix
- Bernie Taupin – lyricist
- David Larkham – art direction, design, cover design, cover artwork, photography
- Barry Wentzell – photography
- Ian Digby-Ovens – photography
- John Tobler – liner notes

== Charts ==
=== Weekly charts ===
Chart (1971)	Peak position
Australian Albums (Kent Music Report)	4
Canada Top Albums/CDs (RPM)	4
Dutch Albums (Album Top 100)	4
Finnish Albums (The Official Finnish Charts)	14
Japanese Albums (Oricon)	30
Spanish Albums (Spanish Albums Chart)	7
UK Albums (Official Charts)	2
US Billboard 200	5

=== Year-end charts ===
Chart (1971)	Position
Australian Albums (Kent Music Report)	25
Dutch Albums (Album Top 100)	32
US Billboard 200	24

== Certifications ==
Region	Certification	Certified units/sales
Australia (ARIA)	Gold	20,000^{^}
United Kingdom (BPI) original release	Gold	100,000^{^}
United Kingdom (BPI) release of 1993	Silver	60,000^{‡}
United States (RIAA)	Platinum	1,000,000^{^}
^{^} Shipments figures based on certification alone.^{‡} Sales+streaming figures based on certification alone.
