= Take Me to the Pilot =

Single by Elton John

from the album Elton John
- A-side: "Your Song"
- Released: 26 October 1970
- Recorded: January 1970
- Studio: Trident Studios (London, England)
- Genre: Rock
- Length: 3:47
- Label: Uni (US); DJM (UK)
- Songwriters: Elton John, Bernie Taupin
- Producer: Gus Dudgeon

"Take Me to the Pilot" is a song written by British musician Elton John and lyricist Bernie Taupin, and performed by John. It was originally released on John's eponymous second album in 1970.

It was recorded at Trident Studios in London in January 1970 and released in the United States in October 1970 as the A-side of a single, with "Your Song" as the B-side. Both songs received airplay, but "Your Song" was preferred by disc jockeys, becoming the singer's first hit (on both sides of the Atlantic) and rendering "Take Me to the Pilot" as the B-side.

The country duo Brothers Osborne recorded a remake of the song for the 2018 tribute album Restoration: Reimagining the Songs of Elton John and Bernie Taupin.

== Composition and inspiration ==
Many – including Elton John himself – find the song's lyrics cryptic and incomprehensible. John said, in The Red Piano Tour in 2005, that "in the early days, there were a lot of inquiries about 'What does this song mean? What does that song mean?' and in the case of 'Take me to the pilot/Lead me through the chamber/Take me to the pilot/I am but a stranger', I have no idea! You're on your own, I tell you."

Lyricist Bernie Taupin has admitted to not knowing what the song's lyrics represent, comparing his writing style in "Pilot" to poets like "Baudelaire and Rimbaud...(who) just threw things together and went 'Wow! That sounds good'".

== Legacy ==
The song become a staple of John's live shows and can be heard on many of his concert recordings – such as a performance with his early 1970s backup musicians, bassist Dee Murray and drummer Nigel Olsson on 17–11–70 (1970) to Live in Australia with the Melbourne Symphony Orchestra (1987) with a full scale orchestral reworking the original Paul Buckmaster score. John also performs the song in a solo version on the album Live in Moscow recorded in 1979.

== Personnel ==
- Elton John – piano, vocals
- Alan Parker – rhythm guitar
- Caleb Quaye – lead guitar
- Alan Weighall – bass guitar
- Barry Morgan – drums
- Dennis Lopez – percussion
- Madeline Bell – backing vocals
- Tony Burrows – backing vocals
- Roger Cook – backing vocals
- Lesley Duncan – backing vocals
- Kay Garner – backing vocals
- Tony Hazzard – backing vocals

== Format and track list ==
- 1970 US 7" single
1. "Your Song" 3:57
2. "Take Me to the Pilot" 3:43
- 1988 US 7" single
1. "Take Me to the Pilot (live)" 3:58
2. "Tonight (live)" 7:26
- 1992 US 7" single
1. "Nikita"
2. "Take Me to the Pilot"
- 1995 US CD single
1. "Blessed" 4:19
2. "Honky Cat (live)" 7:05
3. "Take Me to the Pilot (live)" 5:55
4. "The Bitch is Back (live)" 4:26
