= Tiny Dancer =

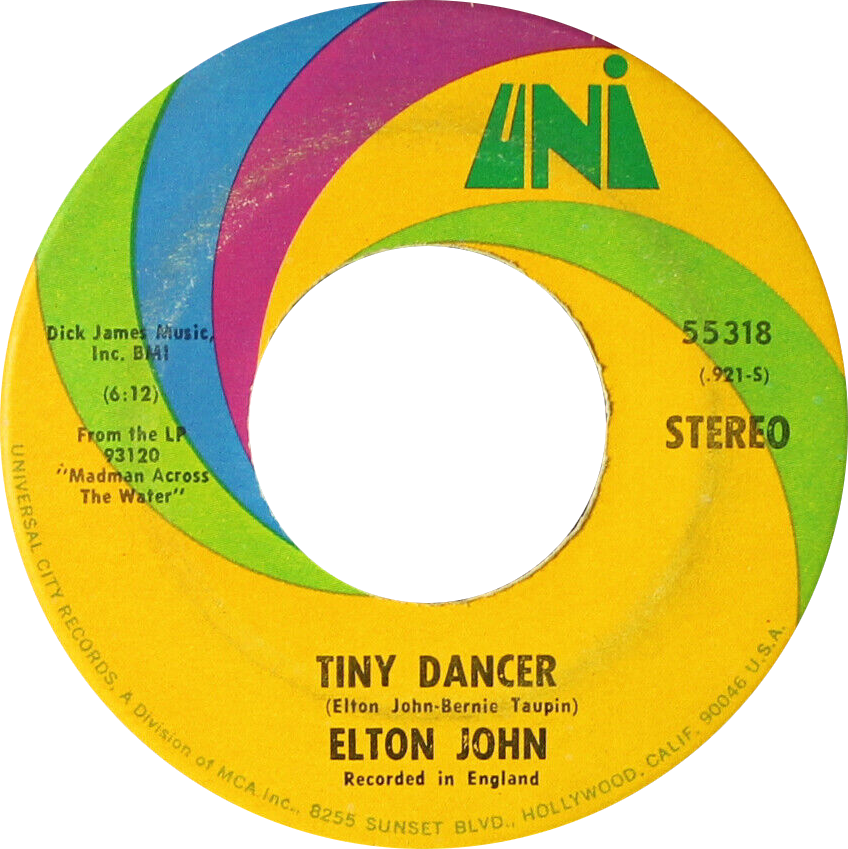
- One of side-A labels of the US single

Single by Elton John

from the album Madman Across the Water
- B-side: "Razor Face"
- Released: February 1972
- Recorded: 9 August 1971
- Studio: Trident Studios, London
- Genre: Soft rock; country rock; pop rock
- Length: 6:12 (album version); 3:45 (7" promotional version)
- Label: Uni
- Songwriters: Elton John; Bernie Taupin
- Producer: Gus Dudgeon

Elton John singles chronology
| "Levon" (1971) | "Tiny Dancer" (1972) | "Rocket Man" (1972) |

Music video
- "Tiny Dancer" on YouTube

"Tiny Dancer" is a song written by British musician Elton John and lyricist Bernie Taupin, and performed by John. It was originally released on John's 1971 album Madman Across the Water as its opening track, and was later produced and released as a single in 1972.

In the United States, it was certified gold on 19 May 2005, platinum on 19 August 2011 and 5× platinum on 6 December 2024 by the Recording Industry Association of America (RIAA). In the UK, "Tiny Dancer" was certified gold on 17 August 2018 by the British Phonographic Industry, platinum on 2 August 2019, 2× platinum on 24 December 2021, and 3× platinum on 16 August 2024.

== Background and writing ==
With lyrics written by Bernie Taupin, the song was first featured as the opening track to John's album Madman Across the Water (1971). The song's lyrics were inspired by Taupin's first visit to the US in 1970, and were intended to capture the spirit of California, where he found the women he met highly contrasted with those whom he had known in his home country of England. Taupin also stated in a 1973 interview in Rolling Stone that the song is about Maxine Feibelman, his wife at the time. In 2019, Feibelman said, "I knew [the song] was about me. I had been into ballet as a little girl and sewed patches on Elton's jackets and jeans", referring to the song's description of a "seamstress for the band".

== History ==
The song features piano-based accompaniment during verses. The arrangement start features pedal steel guitar played by British guitarist B. J. Cole, light percussion, Paul Buckmaster's strings and a quiet choir. Back-up vocals are provided by Tony Burrows, among others.

Due to the song's lengthy run time of 6 minutes, 12 seconds, "Tiny Dancer" was initially a non-starter as a single in the US, reaching only No. 41 on the U.S. pop chart, and was not even released as a single in the UK. Some radio edits ended the song following the first chorus, because the first verse repeats. Some radio stations banned the song, due to the controversial opening lines of the second verse: "Jesus Freaks/ Out in the Streets". The song fared better in Canada, where John had much of his early commercial breakthrough success, peaking at #19. It was also a hit in Australia, peaking at #13. Eventually, the song slowly became one of John's most popular songs even in the territories that initially failed to embrace it, and the full-length version is now a fixture on North American, UK and Australian adult contemporary and rock radio stations. The song also received a boost of popularity after being prominently featured in the 2000 film Almost Famous. The song was also featured in the 1975 film Aloha, Bobby and Rose.

In 1971, Elton John performed the song on the first series of The Old Grey Whistle Test. The performance has been released as part of The Old Grey Whistle Test – Volumes 1–3 Box Set.

In 2010, Rolling Stone ranked the song number 397 on their list of the 500 Greatest Songs of All Time. It was ranked No. 47 on the 2021 revision of the list.

In 2020, the song was inducted into the Grammy Hall of Fame.

== Live performances ==
Since 1971, John regularly performed this song alongside "Levon" on his concert tours in various decades.

An orchestral live version of the song was performed by John with the Melbourne Symphony Orchestra on 14 December 1986 at the Sydney Entertainment Centre during the final concert of his 1986 Tour De Force tour in Australia. That performance was included on his 1987 live album Live in Australia with the Melbourne Symphony Orchestra.

== Music video ==
In May 2017, an official music video for "Tiny Dancer" premiered at the Cannes Film Festival as a winner of Elton John: The Cut, a competition organised in partnership with AKQA, Pulse Films, and YouTube in honour of the fiftieth anniversary of his songwriting relationship with Taupin. The competition called upon independent filmmakers to submit treatments for music videos for one of three Elton John songs from the 1970s, with each song falling within a specific concept category. "Tiny Dancer" was designated for the live-action category, with the competition won by Max Weiland. The video was filmed in Los Angeles, and features scenes of various residents driving around the city, including performer Marilyn Manson and Iris Karina.

== Charts ==
| Chart (1972) | Peak position |
|---|---|
| Australia (Kent Music Report) | 13 |
| Canadian RPM Top Singles | 19 |
| Canadian RPM Adult Contemporary | 20 |
| U.S. Billboard Hot 100 | 41 |
| U.S. Billboard Adult Contemporary | 35 |
| U.S. Cash Box Top 100 | 29 |

| Chart (2015) | Peak position |
|---|---|
| UK Singles (OCC) | 70 |
| Chart (2019) | Peak position |
| US Hot Rock & Alternative Songs (Billboard) | 6 |

== Certifications ==
| Region | Certification | Certified units/sales |
|---|---|---|
| Australia (ARIA) | 7× Platinum | 490,000^{‡} |
| Denmark (IFPI Danmark) | Platinum | 90,000^{‡} |
| Italy (FIMI) | Gold | 35,000^{‡} |
| New Zealand (RMNZ) | 7× Platinum | 210,000^{‡} |
| Spain (Promusicae) | Gold | 30,000^{‡} |
| United Kingdom (BPI) | 3× Platinum | 1,800,000^{‡} |
| United States (RIAA) | 5× Platinum | 5,000,000^{‡} |
^{‡} Sales+streaming figures based on certification alone.

== Personnel ==
- Elton John – acoustic piano, vocals
- Caleb Quaye – electric guitar
- B. J. Cole – pedal steel guitar
- Davey Johnstone – acoustic guitar
- David Glover – bass guitar
- Roger Pope – drums
- Paul Buckmaster – orchestral arrangements and conductor
- David Katz – orchestra contractor
- Tony Burrows – backing vocals
- Nigel Olsson – backing vocals
- Roger Cook – backing vocals
- Dee Murray – backing vocals
- Lesley Duncan – backing vocals
- Barry St. John – backing vocals
- Terry Steele – backing vocals
- Liza Strike – backing vocals
- Sue and Sunny – backing vocals

== Covers ==
In 2002, Ben Folds covered the song live at the Newport Music Festival in Newport, Rhode Island.

Also in 2002, Tim McGraw covered the song for this album, Tim McGraw and the Dancehall Doctors.

In 2009, DJ Ironik and Chipmunk created a remix of the song, featuring John singing the chorus, which peaked at No. 3 on the UK Singles Chart.

In 1990, John Frusciante of the Red Hot Chili Peppers performed his first impromptu performance of the song for the audience of Pinkpop that year. He has since performed the song at least fifty times during Red Hot Chili Peppers shows.

A version featuring Mary Black, Paddy Casey and Declan O'Rourke was recorded in Galway, Ireland in 2012 as a charity single. This version reached number one on the Irish Singles Chart.

In season 3 episode 1 of Friends "The One with the Princess Leia Fantasy", when discussing the most romantic songs, Lisa Kudrow's character Phoebe says that her favourite, the song "Tiny Dancer", was in fact written for Taxi star Tony Danza which she tries to prove by singing the line "Hold me close, young Tony Danza". After a Friends: The Reunion episode, Courteney Cox invited Elton John, Ed Sheeran and Brandi Carlile to pay a short tribute to Lisa's character once famously misquoting the song.

In 2022, it was reported that John was teaming with Britney Spears in a remake of "Tiny Dancer". Later on, John announced a song titled "Hold Me Closer", with Spears also confirming her involvement in the track. The song was released on 26 August 2022, though it leaked online a week ahead. "Hold Me Closer" is a duet between John and Spears that blends the chorus of "Tiny Dancer" with verses from John's 1992 single "The One".
