= Levon (song) =

1971 song by Elton John and Bernie Taupin

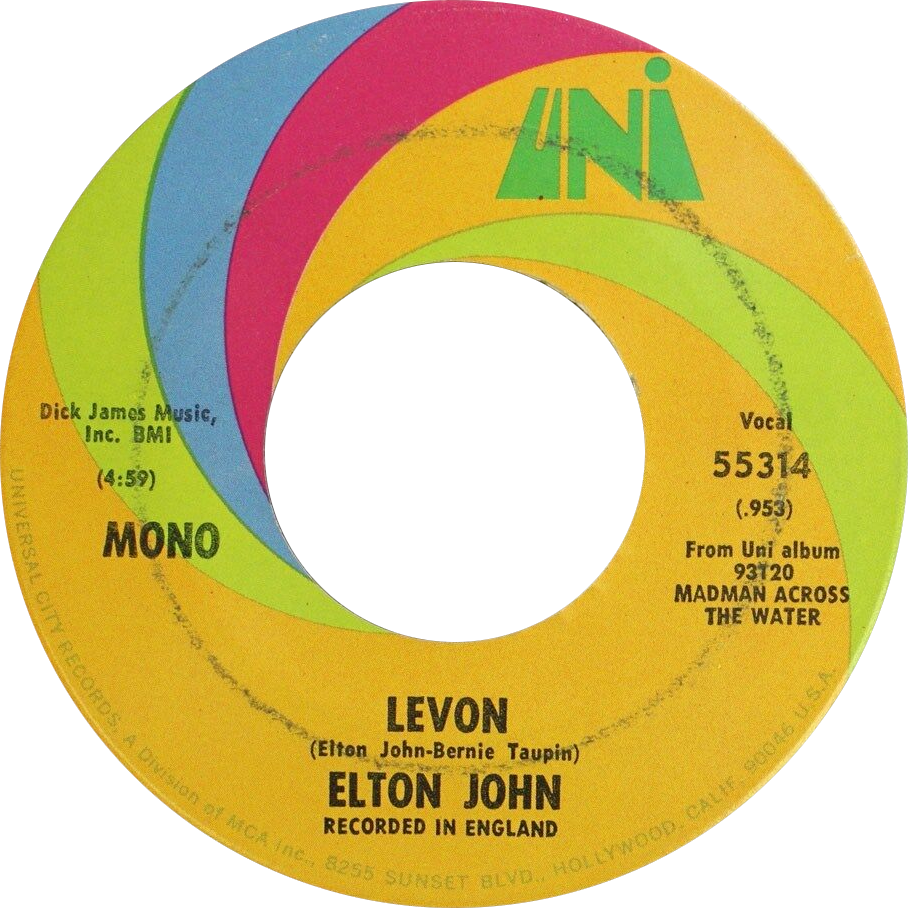
- Side A of original 1971 US single

Single by Elton John

from the album Madman Across the Water
- B-side: "Goodbye"
- Released: 29 November 1971
- Recorded: 27 February 1971; Trident Studios (London, England)
- Genre: Symphonic rock
- Length: 5:22 (album version); 4:59 (single version)
- Label: Uni (US); DJM (UK)
- Songwriters: Elton John; Bernie Taupin
- Producer: Gus Dudgeon

Elton John singles chronology
"Friends" (1971)	"Levon" (1971)	"Tiny Dancer" (1972)

Audio
- "Levon" by Elton John on YouTube

"Levon" is a song written by British musician Elton John and lyricist Bernie Taupin, and performed by John. It was recorded on 27 February 1971, and was released on John's album Madman Across the Water. Backing vocals are provided by Tony Burrows. Paul Buckmaster wrote the orchestral arrangements and conducted the orchestra.

The song reached number 24 on the US Billboard Hot 100, and peaked at number six on the Canadian RPM singles chart.

== History ==
According to Gus Dudgeon, Taupin named the character in the song after the Band's co-founder, drummer and singer Levon Helm. The Band was apparently John and Taupin's favourite group at the time. In 2013, however, Taupin said that the song was unrelated to Helm. According to fellow Band member Robbie Robertson, Levon Helm did not like the song, quoting him as saying "Englishmen shouldn't fuck with Americanisms".

The "Alvin Tostig" mentioned in the song (Levon's father) is, according to Taupin, fictional.

The song was omitted from John's 1974 compilation album Greatest Hits but was included in the U.S. edition of Elton John's Greatest Hits Volume II (1977).

John performed the song for his spring 1972 concert. A portion of the live performance appeared in the bootleg recording releases Scope 72 and Apple Pie.

The song's lyrics refer to the character Levon as being born on Christmas, and John's first son Zachary, who was born on 25 December 2010, has Levon as one of his middle names.

== Reception ==
Author Elizabeth J. Rosenthal in 2001 labelled "Levon" one of Elton John's signature songs. She criticised the orchestra for almost "jeopardizing the simple grandeur of the melody and Elton's chord progressions."

The song peaked at number 24 on Billboard Hot 100 on the week ending 5 February 1972, more than two months after its single release on 29 November 1971.

Record World called it John's and Taupin's "'Eleanor Rigby,' sort of" with high hit potential.

== Charts ==
Chart (1972)	Peak position
Australia (Kent Music Report)	94
Canada Top Singles (RPM)	6
US Billboard Hot 100	24

== Certifications ==
Region	Certification	Certified units/sales
United States (RIAA)	Platinum	1,000,000^{‡}
^{‡} Sales+streaming figures based on certification alone.

== Personnel ==
- Elton John – piano, vocals
- Brian Dee – harmonium
- Caleb Quaye – electric guitar
- Brian Odgers – bass guitar
- Barry Morgan – drums
- Paul Buckmaster – orchestral arrangements and conductor
- David Katz – orchestra contractor

== Notable covers and performances ==
"Levon" has been covered by several artists, including Myles Kennedy, Jon Bon Jovi (who covered the song on the tribute album Two Rooms, and says that "Levon" is his favourite song of all time, saying that he looks up to Elton John as his idol) and Canadian rock singer-songwriter Billy Klippert. Mary McCreary recorded a version of "Levon" on her LP Jezebel, Shelter Records SR-2110 (1974). Phil Lesh and Friends started playing the song in April 2012, shortly after Levon Helm's death.

Since 1971, John regularly performed this song alongside "Tiny Dancer" on his concert tours in various decades.
