= Barry Morgan (musician) =

British drummer (1931–2007)

Jerome Morgan (June 1931 – 1 November 2007), better known as Barry Morgan, was a British drummer for Blue Mink, CCS and other bands. He was the owner of Morgan Studios.

== Personal life and career ==
Morgan was born in London, England in June 1931. He played drums on the British merchant fleet cruise ships in the early 1960s, and later for singer Tom Jones for ten years. Barry and his wife operated the Arena Theater in Houston. AllMusic lists 185 credits between 1964 and 2012. His son Brett Morgan also became a session drummer.

== Discography ==
=== As leader/co-leader ===
- 1971: Bass Guitar and Percussion, Volume 1. Volume 2.
- 1979: Percussion Spectrum - Barry Morgan and Ray Cooper
- 1983: Patterns In Rhythm
- Wonderin'

=== As sideman ===
==== With Blue Mink and C.C.S. ====
- C.C.S.

==== With Gullivers People, Electric Coconut and Elton John ====
- Step into Christmas
- Madman Across the Water
- Tumbleweed Connection
- Elton John

=== With the Walker Brothers ===
- No Regrets
- Lines

==== With David Bowie ====
- Bowie at the Beeb
- The World of David Bowie

==== Various ====
- Histoire de Melody Nelson (Serge Gainsbourg)
- Candles in the Rain (Melanie)
- Izitso (Cat Stevens)
- All This and World War II
- Cinema (Elaine Paige)
- Son of Schmilsson (Harry Nilsson)
- Jeff Wayne's Musical Version of The War of the Worlds
- At the End of a Perfect Day (Chris de Burgh)
- A Possible Projection of the Future / Childhood's End
- Greatest Love Classics
- Mallard
- Evita
- Amours des feintes
- The Mouse and the Mask
- In Hoagland
