= Dee Murray =

English bass guitarist (1946–1992)

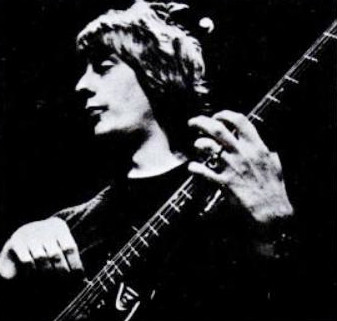
- Murray in 1971

Background information
- Born: David Murray Oates; 3 April 1946; Gillingham, Kent, England
- Died: 15 January 1992 (aged 45) Nashville, Tennessee, U.S.
- Genres: Rock
- Occupations: Musician, songwriter
- Instruments: Bass guitar, vocals
- Years active: 1960s–1992

David Murray Oates (3 April 1946 – 15 January 1992), known as Dee Murray, was an English bass guitarist. He was best known for his long-time collaboration with Elton John as a member of the Elton John Band.

== Biography ==
Murray was born in Gillingham, Kent, England on 3 April 1946. Before joining Elton John as his touring sidemen, Murray and drummer Nigel Olsson were members of the Spencer Davis Group in 1969. In Murray's musician bio in the programme book for 1982's "Jump Up!" tour, Murray recalled when he first took up the bass guitar during his high school years: "Someone put this heavy thing over my shoulder and said, 'Here, you play this!'" Murray quickly established a solid reputation on the instrument. In the Classic Albums documentary on Goodbye Yellow Brick Road, producer Gus Dudgeon lauded Murray's musical ability and said he "hadn't heard a bassist quite as good as him".

Murray and Olsson joined John as his road sidemen in 1970, and first appeared together on disc with John on "Amoreena" from the 1970 studio album Tumbleweed Connection. The following year, they were featured on the live album 17-11-70. While they were John's constant touring bandmates, his record company initially only allowed them to play on just one track per studio album. This changed with Honky Château in 1972 when John exerted some of his skyrocketing popularity at the time to convince DJM Records to allow Murray and Olsson to also become full-time recording members of his band. Along with new recruit Davey Johnstone on guitar, Murray and Olsson played on John's hit albums, including the milestone album Goodbye Yellow Brick Road, singles, and world tours for several years. In 1975, after recording Captain Fantastic and the Brown Dirt Cowboy, Murray and Olsson were released from the band because John wanted to achieve a different sound.

Murray and Olsson continued working together as session musicians in Los Angeles. In 1976 they played on Rick Springfield's fourth album Wait for Night. In 1977, Murray briefly joined Procol Harum on a North America tour promoting their last 1970s album, Something Magic, although he never recorded with the group. Between 1978 and 1979, Murray worked as part of Alice Cooper's backing band. According to music site AllMusic.com, he played on Cooper's hit album From the Inside, and joined Olsson backing The Grateful Dead's Bob Weir on his solo album Heaven Help the Fool in 1978. Other artists he worked with during the 1970s and early 1980s include Yvonne Elliman, England Dan & John Ford Coley, Shaun Cassidy, Allan Clarke, Bernie Taupin, Kiki Dee, Stefanie Gaines, Barbi Benton, and Jimmy Webb.

Murray and Olsson returned to tour and play sessions with John, starting with 21 at 33 in 1980. He and Olsson backed John during his landmark concert in New York City's Central Park before more than 400,000 fans on the Great Lawn on 13 September 1980, and appeared on The Fox in 1981. Murray went on to contribute all the bass tracks on Jump Up! in 1982 and joined Olsson and guitarist Davey Johnstone for the Jump Up! Tour, followed by albums and tours for Too Low for Zero (1983) and Breaking Hearts (1984). The group then disbanded, reuniting once more to record backing vocals on Reg Strikes Back in 1988.

In the 1980s, Murray played on numerous Nashville sessions for artists such as Michael Brown, Lewis Storey, Beth Nielsen Chapman, and John Prine, amongst others.

== Death ==
Murray was married to Maria Gombatz, twin sister to Olsson’s wife Lisa; they had two children and lived in Nashville. Murray also had a daughter from his first marriage.

In January 1992, after battling skin cancer for several years, Murray died of a stroke, at age 45.

On March 15, 1992, Elton John performed a tribute concert at the Grand Ole Opry to raise money for Murray's family.

In a 2011 interview, Olsson said of his long-time bandmate: "I think about him every single day. Brilliant bass player. Wonderful guy. Dear, dear, dear friend. A musical genius across the board." Davey Johnstone believes Murray's musical skills were not fully appreciated and, in March 2011, said he was working on a documentary about Murray.

== Collaborations ==
With Elton John

- Tumbleweed Connection (Uni Records, 1970)
- 17-11-70 (DJM, 1971)
- Madman Across the Water (Uni Records, 1971)
- Honky Château (Uni Records, 1972)
- Don't Shoot Me I'm Only the Piano Player (MCA Records, 1972)
- Goodbye Yellow Brick Road (MCA Records, 1973)
- Caribou (MCA Records, 1974)
- Captain Fantastic and the Brown Dirt Cowboy (MCA Records, 1975)
- 21 at 33 (Rocket, 1980)
- The Fox (Geffen, 1981)
- Jump Up! (Geffen, 1982)
- Too Low for Zero (Geffen, 1983)
- Breaking Hearts (Geffen, 1984)
- Reg Strikes Back (MCA, 1988)

With Beth Nielsen Chapman

- Beth Nielsen Chapman (Reprise Records, 1990)

With Jimmy Webb

- Land's End (Asylum Records, 1974)
- El Mirage (Atlantic Records, 1977)

With John Prine

- Aimless Love (Oh Boy Records, 1984)

With Yvonne Elliman

- Night Flight (RSO Records, 1978)

With Ronnie Hawkins

- The Hawk (United Artists Records, 1979)

With Shaun Cassidy

- Born Late (Curb Records, 1977)
- Under Wraps (Warner Bros. Records, 1978)

With Bernie Taupin

- He Who Rides the Tiger (Elektra Records, 1980)

With Brian Cadd

- White on White (Capitol Records, 1976)

With England Dan & John Ford Coley

- Dr. Heckle and Mr. Jive (Big Tree Records, 1979)
