= Elton John (album) =

Studio album by Elton John
- Released: 10 April 1970
- Recorded: January 1970
- Studios: Trident, London
- Genre: Soft rock
- Length: 39:27
- Labels: Uni; DJM
- Producer: Gus Dudgeon

Elton John chronology
Empty Sky (1969)	Elton John (1970)	Tumbleweed Connection (1970)

Singles from Elton John
- 1. "Border Song" Released: 20 March 1970; 2. "Your Song" Released: 26 October 1970

Elton John is the second studio album by British singer-songwriter Elton John. It was released on 10 April 1970 through DJM Records. Including John's breakthrough single "Your Song", the album helped establish his career during the rise of the singer-songwriter era of popular music.

In the US, Elton John was certified gold in February 1971 by the RIAA. In the same year, it was nominated for the Grammy Award for Album of the Year at the 13th Annual Grammy Awards. In 2003, the album was ranked number 468 on Rolling Stone magazine's list of the 500 greatest albums of all time. On 27 November 2012, it was inducted into the Grammy Hall of Fame as an album cited as exhibiting "qualitative or historical significance".

== Production ==
This was the first of a string of John albums produced by Gus Dudgeon. As Dudgeon recalled in a Mix magazine interview, the album was not actually intended to launch John as an artist, but rather as a collection of polished demos for other artists to consider recording his and co-writer Bernie Taupin's songs.

The song "No Shoe Strings on Louise" was intended (as homage or parody) to sound like a Rolling Stones song.

== Reception ==
Professional ratings
Review scores
Source	Rating
AllMusic	4.5/5 stars
The Encyclopedia of Popular Music	5/5 stars
The Village Voice	B

John Mendelsohn in a contemporary (1970) review for Rolling Stone felt that the album was over-produced and over-orchestrated, comparing it unfavourably with the less mannered and orchestrated Empty Sky; though he felt that John had "so immense a talent" that "he'll delight you senseless despite it all". Robert Christgau in his weekly "Consumer Guide" column for The Village Voice also felt the album was overdone ("overweening", "histrionic overload", "semi-classical ponderousness"), but that it had "a surprising complement of memorable tracks", including "Your Song" which, despite its "affected offhandedness", he considered "an instant standard".

== Track listing ==
All tracks are written by Elton John and Bernie Taupin.

Side one
No.	Title	Length
1.	"Your Song"	4:04
2.	"I Need You to Turn To"	2:32
3.	"Take Me to the Pilot"	3:46
4.	"No Shoe Strings on Louise"	3:31
5.	"First Episode at Hienton"	4:48

Side two
No.	Title	Length
6.	"Sixty Years On"	4:35
7.	"Border Song"	3:22
8.	"The Greatest Discovery"	4:12
9.	"The Cage"	3:28
10.	"The King Must Die"	5:21
Total length:		39:27

Bonus tracks (1995 Mercury and 1996 Rocket reissue)
No.	Title	Length
11.	"Bad Side of the Moon"	3:15
12.	"Grey Seal"	3:35
13.	"Rock and Roll Madonna"	4:18
Total length:		50:35

2008 deluxe edition bonus disc
No.	Title	Length
1.	"Your Song" (Demo version)	3:33
2.	"I Need You to Turn To" (Piano demo)	2:10
3.	"Take Me to the Pilot" (Piano demo)	2:34
4.	"No Shoe Strings on Louise" (Piano demo)	3:31
5.	"Sixty Years On" (Piano demo)	4:20
6.	"The Greatest Discovery" (Piano demo)	3:56
7.	"The Cage" (Demo version)	3:20
8.	"The King Must Die" (Piano demo)	5:22
9.	"Rock and Roll Madonna" (Piano demo)	3:10
10.	"Thank You Mama" (Piano demo)	3:19
11.	"All the Way Down to El Paso" (Piano demo)	2:48
12.	"I'm Going Home" (Piano demo)	3:03
13.	"Grey Seal" (Piano demo)	3:18
14.	"Rock and Roll Madonna" (Incomplete band demo)	2:53
15.	"Bad Side of the Moon"	3:11
16.	"Grey Seal" (1970 version)	3:34
17.	"Rock and Roll Madonna"	4:16
18.	"Border Song" (BBC session)	3:19
19.	"Your Song" (BBC session)	3:59
20.	"Take Me to the Pilot" (BBC session)	3:33
Total length:		65:49

== B-sides ==
Song	Format
"Bad Side of the Moon"	"Border Song" 7" (US)
"Into the Old Man's Shoes"	"Your Song" 7" (UK)

== US 8-Track Tape Version ==
The US version of the 8-track tape of Elton John released by MCA Records (citation: MCA MCT-3000) repeats the tracks "Your Song" and "I Need You To Turn To", total time 46:00, and has the following running order:

Program 1: Your Song : I Need You To Turn To : First Episode At Hienton

Program 2: No Shoe Strings On Louise : Sixty Years On : Border Song

Program 3: I Need You To Turn To : Your Song : The King Must Die

Program 4: Take Me To The Pilot : The Greatest Discovery : The Cage

== Live recordings ==
Elton John performed many of these songs live.

Elton John performed live recordings of “Take me to the pilot”, “Your song”, “The King Must Die”, “Sixty Years On”, “Burn Down the Mission”, and “I need to Turn You on”. Which took place in Sydney Entertainment Centre in Sydney, Australia, Elton performed this song alongside The Melbourne Symphony Orchestra, In 1987 during his 1986-1987 Tour

== Personnel ==
Track numbers refer to CD and digital releases of the album.

- Elton John – piano, vocals (all tracks), harpsichord (2)
- Diana Lewis – Moog synthesizer (5, 9)
- Brian Dee – organ (6, 7)
- Frank Clark – acoustic guitar (1), double bass (10)
- Colin Green – additional guitar (1, 7), Spanish guitar (6)
- Clive Hicks – twelve-string guitar (1), rhythm guitar (4), guitar (7, 8, 10), acoustic guitar (9)
- Roland Harker – guitar (2)
- Alan Parker – rhythm guitar (3)
- Caleb Quaye – lead guitar (3, 4, 5), additional guitar (9)
- Dave Richmond – bass guitar, double bass (1, 7, 8)
- Alan Weighall – bass guitar (3, 4, 9)
- Les Hurdle – bass guitar (10)
- Barry Morgan – drums (1, 3, 4, 7, 9)
- Terry Cox – drums (8, 10)
- Dennis Lopez – percussion (3, 4)
- Tex Navarra – percussion (9)
- Skaila Kanga – harp (2, 8)
- Paul Buckmaster – cello solo (8), orchestral arrangements and conductor
- David Katz – orchestra contractor
- Madeline Bell – backing vocals (3, 4, 7, 9)
- Tony Burrows – backing vocals (3, 4, 7, 9)
- Roger Cook – backing vocals (3, 4, 7, 9)
- Lesley Duncan – backing vocals (3, 4, 7, 9)
- Kay Garner – backing vocals (3, 4, 7, 9)
- Tony Hazzard – backing vocals (3, 4, 7, 9)
- Barbara Moore – backing vocals, choir leader (7)

Technical

- Gus Dudgeon – producer, liner notes
- Robin Geoffrey Cable – engineer
- Gus Skinas – editing SACD release
- Alan Harris – original mastering
- Tony Cousins – remastering
- Ricky Graham – digital transfers
- Greg Penny – surround sound 5.1 & Dolby Atmos Mix
- Steve Brown – production coordinator
- David Larkham – art direction
- Stowell Stanford – photography
- Jim Goff – artwork
- John Tobler – liner notes

== Accolades ==
Grammy Awards

Year	Nominee / work	Award	Result
1971	Elton John	Album of the Year	Nominated
1971	Elton John	Best Pop Vocal Performance – Male	Nominated

== Charts ==
=== Weekly charts ===
Chart (1970–1972)	Peak position
Australian Albums (Kent Music Report)	2
Canada Top Albums/CDs (RPM)	4
Dutch Albums (Album Top 100)	2
Japanese Albums (Oricon)	40
UK Albums (Official Charts)	5
US Billboard 200	4

=== Year-end charts ===
Chart (1971)	Position
Australian Albums (Kent Music Report)	24
Dutch Albums (Album Top 100)	17
US Billboard 200	30

== Certifications ==
Region	Certification	Certified units/sales
Australia (ARIA)	Gold	20,000^{^}
Canada (Music Canada)	Platinum	100,000^{^}
New Zealand (RMNZ)	Platinum	15,000^{‡}
United Kingdom (BPI)	Gold	100,000^{^}
United States (RIAA)	Gold	500,000
^{^} Shipments figures based on certification alone.^{‡} Sales+streaming figures based on certification alone.
