= Bluesology =

British blues band (1962–1968)

- Origin: Pinner, Middlesex, England
- Genres: British blues; blue-eyed soul; rhythm and blues
- Years active: 1962–1968
- Labels: Fontana, Polydor
- Past members: Reggie Dwight (Elton John); Stewart "Stu" Brown; Geoff Dyson; Rex Bishop; Mick Inkpen; Jim Wheeler; Pat Higgs; Dave Murphy; Paul Gale; Fred Gandy [AKA Freddie Creasey] Pete Gavin; Neil Hubbard; Elton Dean; Marc Charig; Alan Walker; Long John Baldry; Marsha Hunt; Caleb Quaye; Bernie Holland; Jimmy Horowitz; Big Jim Sullivan

Bluesology was a 1960s British blues group led by Long John Baldry, best remembered as being the first professional band of Elton John (then known by his birth name Reginald Dwight).

== History ==
From about 1960, organist Reginald Dwight – then aged 13 – and his neighbour, singer and guitarist Stewart "Stu" Brown, performed with a local group, the Corvettes, in Pinner, Middlesex, a suburb of London. After that group separated, the pair formed a new group, Bluesology, with Rex Bishop (bass), and Mick Inkpen (drums).

According to Dwight, the band's name was in homage to the Django Reinhardt album Djangology. There had also been a 1956 piece named "Bluesology" by Milt Jackson of the Modern Jazz Quartet. By 1962 they had begun playing local pubs, and in 1963, they won a regular weekly slot at the Establishment Club in London, playing tunes by Muddy Waters, Jimmy Witherspoon and Memphis Slim, among others. In 1965, they turned professional, and signed a contract with an agency which began hiring them out as a backing band for visiting American performers, including The Isley Brothers, Doris Troy, Billy Stewart and Patti LaBelle.

After recording a demo they were signed by Fontana Records. On their audition, the label preferred the singing voice of Dwight instead of the original singer of the band, Brown, and Dwight therefore sang on their first single. The single, written by Dwight, was "Come Back Baby", which was released in July 1965. In November 1965, they released a second single, "Mr. Frantic", again written and sung by Dwight, and again unsuccessful. After a tour of Germany, the band returned to England to work as the backing band for Major Lance with an expanded line-up of Dwight, Brown, Pat Higgs (trumpet), Dave Murphy (saxophone), Fred Gandy (bass) and Paul Gale (drums).

In September 1966, the band was invited by vocalist Long John Baldry to become his regular band. Only Dwight and Brown agreed, thus forming with Baldry a new version of Bluesology, along with Fred Gandy (bass), Pete Gavin (drums), Neil Hubbard (guitar), Elton Dean (saxophone), Marc Charig (cornet and flugelhorn), and Alan Walker (vocals), and, for a brief spell, singer Marsha Hunt. As Stu Brown and Bluesology, they recorded the single "Since I Found You Baby" for Polydor Records, produced by Kenny Lynch. On 11 December 1966, there was a recording session at Abbey Road Studios with Little Richard; four songs were recorded, two were released in the U. K.

As Baldry's music drifted more towards the cabaret market, Dwight became disenchanted with the band, and so simultaneously began to develop songwriting skills in collaboration with Bernie Taupin whilst working as a session musician. Dwight, Brown and Dean all quit Bluesology in late 1967, Brown's replacement being Caleb Quaye, only for the band to separate the following year.

== Later activities ==
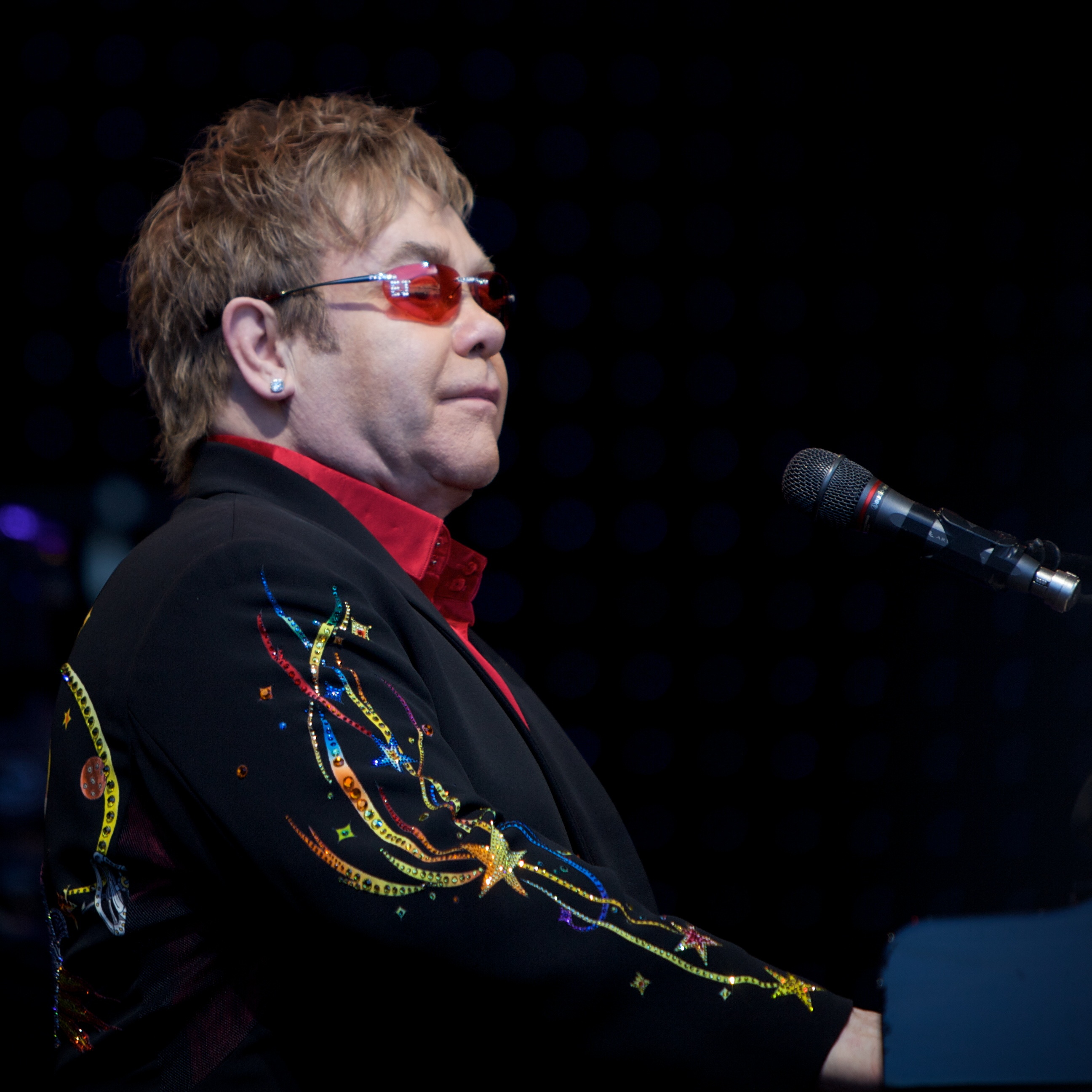
Elton John, formerly known as Reginald Dwight, performing in 2009

Dwight used the names of fellow band members Elton Dean and John Baldry to create his new solo stage name of Elton John. Brown went on to form country rock band Cochise, playing and singing on their first two albums, Cochise and Swallow Tales, in 1970–71, before moving to the Mediterranean. Dean, Hubbard and Charig all had lengthy careers as jazz and session musicians. Gavin became a member of Heads Hands & Feet and later Vinegar Joe, and Gandy joined Caleb Quaye's band Hookfoot.

Two Bluesology songs were featured on the compilation album, Rare Tracks, which was issued by Polydor in 1975.

== See also ==
- List of British blues musicians
