= Live in Barcelona (Elton John video) =

Live World Tour 1992
- Live World Tour 1992 laser disc cover

Live album by Elton John
- Released: 2002
- Recorded: July 21, 1992
- Venue: Mini Estadi, Barcelona, Spain
- Length: 122:29
- Label: Warner Vision

Live World Tour 1992 (international title: Live In Barcelona) is a live video release of Elton John performing some of his hits live in Barcelona, Catalonia, Spain. The concert was recorded on July 21, 1992. Gianni Versace served as the show's production designer, designing the costumes and lighting.

This concert was a part of The One Tour, in which John started visited countries for the first time, i.e. Mexico, Argentina, and Singapore.

== Track listing ==
1. "Don't Let the Sun Go Down on Me" - 5:41
2. "I'm Still Standing" - 3:02
3. "I Guess That's Why They Call It the Blues" - 4:31
4. "Tiny Dancer" - 6:23
5. "Philadelphia Freedom" - 6:15
6. "Burn Down the Mission" - 6:00
7. "Simple Life" - 6:07
8. "The One" - 5:54
9. "I Don't Wanna Go on with You Like That" - 4:33
10. "Mona Lisas and Mad Hatters" (1 & 2) - 12:04
11. "Sorry Seems to Be the Hardest Word" - 3:58
12. "Daniel" - 3:52
13. "Blue Avenue" - 4:16
14. "The Last Song" - 3:42
15. "Funeral for a Friend/Love Lies Bleeding" - 9:51
16. "Sad Songs (Say So Much)" - 12:27
17. "The Show Must Go On" - 4:14
18. "Saturday Night's Alright for Fighting" - 5:09
19. "Sacrifice" - 5:16
20. "Song for Guy"/"Your Song" - 9:33

== Personnel ==
- Guitar: Davey Johnstone
- Bass: Bob Birch
- Drums: Charlie Morgan
- Keyboards: Guy Babylon, Mark Taylor
- Percussion: Ray Cooper
- Backing Vocals: Natalie Jackson, Mortonette Jenkins, Marlena Jeter

== Certifications ==
Region	Certification	Certified units/sales
Australia (ARIA)	2× Platinum	30,000^{^}
^{^} Shipments figures based on certification alone.
