= Cochise (disambiguation) =

Cochise (1805–1874) was an Apache chief who led an uprising.

Cochise may also refer to:

- Cochise (album), an album by the band Cochise
- Cochise (band), a country rock band
- "Cochise" (song), a song by Audioslave
- "Cochise", a track from the Mike Oldfield album Guitars
- Cochise (rapper) (born 1998), an American rapper
- Ernesto Bernabe II (died 1990), Filipino student and murder victim, nicknamed "Cochise"
- Martín Emilio Rodríguez (born 1942), Colombian road racing cyclist known as Cochise
- Cochise (crater), a crater in Taurus-Littrow valley on the Moon
- Cochise, Arizona, a town in Cochise County
- Cochise County, Arizona, a county in Arizona, United States
- Cochise Tradition, an archaeological culture
- Cochise, a character in the television series Falling Skies
- T-42 Cochise, a training version of the Beechcraft Baron aircraft
