= The One (Elton John album) =

Studio album by Elton John
- Released: 22 June 1992
- Recorded: November 1991 – March 1992
- Studios: Studio Guillaume Tell (Paris, France); Townhouse Studios (London, England); AIR Studios (London, England)
- Genre: Rock
- Length: 58:05
- Labels: MCA (US); Rocket (UK)
- Producer: Chris Thomas

Elton John chronology
To Be Continued... (1990)	The One (1992)	Greatest Hits 1976–1986 (1992)

Singles from The One
- 1. "The One" Released: 25 May 1992; 2. "Runaway Train" Released: 20 July 1992; 3. "The Last Song" Released: 26 October 1992; 4. "Simple Life" Released: 10 May 1993

Professional ratings
Review scores
Source	Rating
AllMusic	3/5 stars
Calgary Herald	B−
Chicago Tribune	3/4 stars
Robert Christgau	C+
The Encyclopedia of Popular Music	3/5 stars
Entertainment Weekly	B
Los Angeles Times	3.5/4 stars
Q	3/5 stars
The Windsor Star	B+

The One is the twenty-third studio album by British musician Elton John, released on 22 June 1992. It was recorded at Studio Guillaume Tell in Paris, produced by Chris Thomas and managed by John Reid. The album was dedicated to Vance Buck, and its cover artwork was designed by Gianni Versace.

The One spent three consecutive weeks at No. 2 without reaching No. 1 on the UK Albums Chart, being kept off the top spot by the Lionel Richie compilation Back to Front. It was John's biggest-selling album in the US since 1976, and was certified 2× platinum in that country by the RIAA. It is also John's only studio album to reach number one in Germany.

== Background ==
Olle Romö collaborated with Elton John and lyricist Bernie Taupin on one song, "Runaway Train", in which Eric Clapton sang a duet with John. Pink Floyd's David Gilmour also made an appearance, playing guitar on "Understanding Women". The Elton John Band's long-standing drummer Nigel Olsson and female backing vocalist Kiki Dee (who had duetted with John on his hit single "Don't Go Breaking My Heart") and longtime guitarist Davey Johnstone provided backing vocals on a few songs.

The One was John's first album project since his rehabilitation from drug and alcohol addictions and bulimia in 1990. On the album, he returned to playing an acoustic piano (a Yamaha Disklavier) in place of the Roland RD-1000 digital piano that had featured heavily on the previous albums Reg Strikes Back (1988) and Sleeping with the Past (1989), although he did use the RD-1000 again during his The One Tour supporting the album (as documented on Live in Barcelona) and on his later album Duets (1993).

== Track listing ==
All songs composed by Elton John and Bernie Taupin, except "Runaway Train", co-written by Olle Romö.

No.	Title	Length
1.	"Simple Life"	6:25
2.	"The One"	5:53
3.	"Sweat It Out"	6:38
4.	"Runaway Train" (duet with Eric Clapton)	5:23
5.	"Whitewash County"	5:30
6.	"The North"	5:15
7.	"When a Woman Doesn't Want You"	4:56
8.	"Emily"	4:58
9.	"On Dark Street"	4:43
10.	"Understanding Women"	5:03
11.	"The Last Song"	3:21
Total length:		58:05

Bonus tracks (1998 Polygram International reissue)
No.	Title	Length
12.	"Suit of Wolves"	5:37
13.	"Fat Boys and Ugly Girls"	4:13
Total length:		67:55

== Personnel ==
=== Musicians ===
- Elton John – vocals, keyboards
- Mark Taylor – keyboards (1–3, 6, 7)
- Guy Babylon – keyboards (2–5, 7–11), programming (2–5, 7–11)
- Adam Seymour – guitars (1, 2, 6, 7)
- Davey Johnstone – guitars (2–5, 7–9), backing vocals (7, 9)
- Eric Clapton – guitar (4), vocals (4)
- David Gilmour – guitar (10)
- Pino Palladino – bass
- Olle Romo – drums, percussion, programming
- Beckie Bell – backing vocals (4)
- Carole Fredericks – backing vocals (4)
- Joniece Jamison – backing vocals (4)
- Kiki Dee – backing vocals (7, 9, 10)
- Nigel Olsson – backing vocals (7, 9)

=== Production ===
- Chris Thomas – producer
- David Nicholas – engineer
- Andy Strange – assistant engineer
- Alex Firla – studio assistant, studio assistant (4)
- Andy Bradfield – studio assistant (4)
- The Hit Factory London – cutting location
- Steve Brown – album coordinator
- Adrian Collee – studio coordinator
- Sam Stell – studio coordinator
- Lee Dixon – technician to Eric Clapton
- Vince Barker – technician to Mark Taylor
- Patrick Dermarchelier – photography
- Gianni Versace – cover design concept
- John Reid – management

== Charts ==
=== Weekly charts ===
Weekly chart performance for The One
Chart (1992)	Peak position
Australian Albums (ARIA)	2
Austrian Albums (Ö3 Austria)	1
Canada Top Albums/CDs (RPM)	7
Danish Albums (Hitlisten)	3
Dutch Albums (Album Top 100)	14
European Albums (Music & Media)	1
French Albums (SNEP)	1
German Albums (Offizielle Top 100)	1
Hungarian Albums (MAHASZ)	32
Italian Albums (Musica e Dischi)	1
Japanese Albums (Oricon)	35
New Zealand Albums (RMNZ)	7
Norwegian Albums (VG-lista)	2
Spanish Albums (Spanish Albums Chart)	1
Swedish Albums (Sverigetopplistan)	8
Swiss Albums (Schweizer Hitparade)	1
UK Albums (Official Charts)	2
US Billboard 200	8

=== Year-end charts ===
Year-end chart performance for The One
Chart (1992)	Position
Argentina Foreign Albums (CAPIF)	12
Australian Albums (ARIA)	27
Austrian Albums (Ö3 Austria Top 40)	9
French Albums (SNEP)	18
Swiss Albums (Schweizer Hitparade)	11
UK Albums Chart (OCC)	52
US Billboard 200	59

== Certifications ==
Certifications for The One
Region	Certification	Certified units/sales
Argentina (CAPIF)	Platinum	60,000^{^}
Australia (ARIA)	2× Platinum	140,000^{^}
Austria (IFPI Austria)	Platinum	50,000^{*}
Canada (Music Canada)	3× Platinum	300,000^{^}
Denmark (IFPI Danmark)	Platinum	80,000^{^}
France (SNEP)	Platinum	300,000^{*}
Germany (BVMI)	Gold	250,000^{^}
Italy (FIMI)	2× Platinum	400,000
Mexico (AMPROFON)	Gold	100,000^{^}
New Zealand (RMNZ)	Platinum	15,000^{^}
Norway (IFPI Norway)	Platinum	50,000^{*}
Spain (Promusicae)	Platinum	100,000^{^}
Switzerland (IFPI Switzerland)	2× Platinum	100,000^{^}
United Kingdom (BPI)	Gold	100,000^{^}
United States (RIAA)	2× Platinum	2,000,000^{^}
^{*} Sales figures based on certification alone.^{^} Shipments figures based on certification alone.
