= Swallow Tales =

Swallow Tales may refer to:

- Swallow Tales (Cochise album), 1971
- Swallow Tales (John Scofield album), 2020
