= Jokers Wild (band) =

British rock band

- Origin: Cambridge, England
- Genres: Rock
- Years active: 1964–1967
- Past members: David Altham; David Gilmour; John Gordon; Tony Sainty; Clive Welham; Marilyn Minns; Jeff Whittaker; Peter Gilmour; Willie Wilson; Rick Wills

Jokers Wild were a British rock band formed in Cambridge, England, in 1964. The group were active until 1967, and are best known for launching the career of guitarist David Gilmour, who went on to join Pink Floyd.

== Career ==
Jokers Wild formed in late 1963 in Cambridge, and first performed in February 1964. The original musicians were Dave Altham (piano, saxophone and vocals), a student at Trinity College, Tony Sainty (bass guitar and vocals), previously with The Redcaps and before that a St John's College choirboy, Johnny Gordon (rhythm guitar and vocals) and Clive Welham (drums and vocals), both from the Ramblers, and David Gilmour (lead guitar and vocals), previously with the Newcomers. Two part-timers joined them for some gigs: Jeff Whittaker (congas and vocals) was a regular at Les Jeux Interdits (below), and Marilyn Minns (vocals) sang Françoise Hardy and Marianne Faithfull songs at parties.

Jokers Wild was conceived as an all-singing band, a move towards the Beatles/Hollies type of group and away from the instrumental plus singer line-up then common. ‘We were brave enough to do harmony singing that other groups wouldn’t attempt, including Beach Boys and Four Seasons numbers’, said Tony Sainty.

The band played at youth clubs, village halls, private parties and major venues in Cambridge (a 1964 business card designed by Johnny Gordon describes the band as "A versatile beat group for dances, parties, socials, etc."), including the Dorothy, the Guildhall and the Victoria, where they had a regular residence at Les Jeux Interdits, a club popular with foreign language students. Occasionally, larger gigs were played, including Peterhouse May Ball, and at Westminster Art College in London, where a coach-load of fans from Cambridge watched the band supporting The Animals.

In October 1965 they played at Rose and Libby January's 21st birthday party, playing with singer/songwriter Paul Simon (then touring the UK), who joined them to sing "Johnny B. Goode", and Pink Floyd, the band with whom Gilmour was later to find fame. Another guest was Libby's partner Storm Thorgerson of Hipgnosis, who later designed Pink Floyd's album covers. One of them, Ummagumma, featured the Januarys' kitchen and garden in a sequence of ‘pictures in a picture’.

Soon after, on 2 November 1965, they travelled to London's famous ‘Tin Pan Alley’ where at Regent Sound Studio in Denmark Street they recorded five tracks for fans.

At the end of 1965 Sainty left and was replaced by Peter Gilmour, David's brother, on bass and vocals. At the same time the band's musical direction was changing towards more Soul, R & B and Tamla Motown numbers as they got work at US Air Force bases.

Thinking of going fully professional, the band contacted several promoters early in 1966 including Brian Somerville (the Beatles’ publicity manager) and Lionel Bart. Jonathan King, Altham's fellow student at Trinity College was also approached and in April 1966 he produced the band's next single, Sam and Dave’s “You Don’t Know Like I Know” and Otis Redding’s “That's How Strong My Love Is”. It was due to be released by Decca Records, but this didn't go ahead when Sam and Dave's original was released.

Clive Welham, who was having difficulty drumming because of a wrist injury, left in April 1966 and was replaced on drums by Willie Wilson (who had previously played in the HiFi's and the Newcomers).

In the summer of 1966 Jokers Wild got a residency at the Hotel los Monteros, Marbella, Spain. Peter Gilmour left to go to university, and Johnny Gordon decided to complete his art degree at Cambridge School of Art. Peter Gilmour was replaced on bass by Rick Wills, previously with the Soul Committee.

So the line-up that went to Spain was Altham, Gilmour, Wilson and Wills. They returned to Cambridge briefly in the autumn of 1966. Altham left, and they travelled to France as a trio, first to play for a couple of months in St Etienne, and then in early 1967 in Paris. Now called The Flowers, they played in France, travelling as far as St Tropez. The band finally returned to the UK around June 1967 when David Gilmour fell ill, and broke up later that year.

David Gilmour joined Pink Floyd early in 1968, after working as a deliveryman for Quorum, a fashion house. Willie Wilson went on to play in a number of successful bands including Cochise and Quiver. Wilson played drums and bass on Syd Barrett's solo albums, The Madcap Laughs and Barrett, the later sessions of which were produced by Gilmour. He also was a surrogate drummer on the live shows for The Wall and the live album Is There Anybody Out There? The Wall Live 1980–81, which came out in 2000. Rick Wills also played in successful bands including Peter Frampton's band Frampton's Camel, Cochise (with Willie), Foreigner and Bad Company. Johnny Gordon and Peter Gilmour made careers respectively as graphic artist (and later magician) and accountant. Wills and Wilson supported David Gilmour on his 1978 solo debut album. Clive Welham worked at the Cambridge University Press until his retirement and maintained an involvement in the Cambridgeshire music scene as lead singer in various bands including Solitaire and Executive Suite.

== Members ==
Original members (February 1964)

- David Altham – vocals, keyboards, saxophone (to September 1966, died 8 February 2021)
- David Gilmour – vocals, guitar, harmonica
- John Gordon – guitar, vocals (to June 1966)
- Tony Sainty – bass guitar, vocals (to end 1965)
- Clive Welham – drums, vocals (to April 1966, died 9 May 2012)

Part time members

- Marilyn Minns (occasional singer for parties and Blue Horizon club, July – September 1964)
- Jeff Whittaker (Congas, Vocals, September 1964 – June 1966)

Replacements

- Peter Gilmour – bass guitar, vocals (January–June 1966, replacing Tony Sainty)
- Willie Wilson – drums (from April 1966, replacing Clive Welham)
- Rick Wills – bass guitar (from June 1966, replacing Peter Gilmour)

Apart from Altham, the original band members had previously played in other Cambridge bands (see above). The replacements had stood or sat in as temporary players before joining permanently.

== Recordings ==
Jokers Wild did two recording sessions, both at Regent Sound studio in Denmark Street, London.

The first, on 2 November 1965, was a self-funded and self-produced session, and resulted in a privately pressed, single-sided studio album (carrying catalogue number RSLP 007) and single (RSR 0031). 50 copies of each were made and distributed to fans. A tape recording of the LP is held by the British Library's British Library Sound Archive.

The album's five tracks (showing previous artists) featuring David Gilmour and Dave Altham on vocals, were:

1. "Why Do Fools Fall in Love" (Frankie Lymon & the Teenagers; Beach Boys)
2. "Walk Like a Man" (Four Seasons)
3. "Don't Ask Me What I Say" (Manfred Mann)
4. "Big Girls Don't Cry" (Four Seasons)
5. "Beautiful Delilah" (Chuck Berry; the Kinks)

The single had "Don't Ask Me What I Say", backed by "Why Do Fools Fall in Love".

The second session, in April 1966, was produced by Jonathan King, and funded by Decca Records. It featured David Gilmour singing Sam & Dave's "You Don't Know Like I Know", backed by Otis Redding's "That's How Strong My Love Is". This was to be released in the UK but when Sam & Dave's original was released it was decided not to release the Jokers Wild version.
