= From the Big Apple to the Big Easy =

From the Big Apple to the Big Easy was two benefit concerts for the people of the Gulf Coast as they recovered from Hurricane Katrina (August 23, 2005 – August 31, 2005). The concerts took place simultaneously at Madison Square Garden and Radio City Music Hall, these venues being approximately 1 mile (1.6 km) apart. The Big Easy is a nickname for New Orleans and the Big Apple is a nickname for New York City.

The concerts took place on September 20, 2005. On August 22, 2006, Rhino Entertainment and Madison Square Garden Entertainment released the two-CD recording of the concerts.

Proceeds reached approximately $9 million, which was directed to the Bush Clinton Katrina Fund, Habitat for Humanity, MusiCares, and the Children's Health Fund.

== Tracks ==
The recording includes introductions of artists by Ed Bradley, Jessica Lange, Scarlett Johansson, John Fogerty and Paul Newman.

=== Disc 1 ===
1. Jazz Funeral - Dirge/Celebrate - Rebirth Brass Band
2. "Southern Nights" - Allen Toussaint
3. "All These Things" - Art Neville
4. "Hercules" - Lenny Kravitz
5. "On Your Way Down", "Yes We Can Can" - Elvis Costello
6. "Ain't Got No Home" - Clarence "Frogman" Henry
7. "Fortune Teller" - Jimmy Buffett
8. "A Change Is Gonna Come" - Aaron Neville
9. "Big Chief" - Cyril Neville
10. "Time Is on My Side" - Irma Thomas
11. "Last Train", "I Know (You Don't Love Me No More)" - Cyndi Lauper, Allen Toussaint
12. "My Brother Jake", "Iko Iko" - Irma Thomas, The Dixie Cups, Cyndi Lauper
13. "I Think It's Going to Rain Today" - Bette Midler
14. "Levon" - Elton John
15. "My Girl Josephine" - Ry Cooder
16. "Rock Me Baby" - Buckwheat Zydeco
17. "When the Levee Breaks" - Lenny Kravitz
18. "Backwater Blues" - Irma Thomas

=== Disc 2 ===
1. "Pascagoula Run" - Jimmy Buffett
2. "Heart of Gold" - Jimmy Buffett, Dave Matthews
3. "Son of a Son of a Sailor" - Jimmy Buffett
4. "Fins" - Jimmy Buffett
5. "Margaritaville" - Jimmy Buffett
6. "Sea Cruise" - Jimmy Buffett
7. "Born on the Bayou" - John Fogerty
8. "Proud Mary" - John Fogerty
9. "The Monkey" - Dave Bartholomew, Elvis Costello
10. "I'm Walkin'" - Diana Krall, Troy Andrews
11. "St. James Infirmary Blues" - Kermit Ruffins
12. "Mrs. Robinson" - Simon & Garfunkel
13. "Homeward Bound" - Simon & Garfunkel
14. "Bridge over Troubled Water" - Simon & Garfunkel, Aaron Neville
15. "Carry The Torch" - The Neville Brothers
16. "Hey Pocky Way" - The Neville Brothers, The Meters
17. "Amazing Grace" - The Neville Brothers, The Meters
18. "When the Saints Go Marching In" - The Neville Brothers, The Meters
19. "When The Saints Go Marching In" (Brass Band Reprise) - Rebirth Brass Band, The Dirty Dozen Brass Band

== Personnel ==
- Guitar: Bob Britt, Billy Burnette, Doyle Grisham, Davey Johnstone, Sonny Landreth, Peter Mayer, Mac McAnally, Leo Nocentelli, Larry Saltzman
- Bass: Bob Birch, Nick Daniels, Jim Mayer, George Porter Jr., Chris Severin, Freddie Washington
- Keyboards: Guy Babylon, Ted Baker, Warren Bernhardt, Matt Nolen, Bill Payne, Paul Shaffer, Michael Utley
- Drums: Steve Gadd, Willie Green, Roger Guth, Herman Lebeaux, John Molo, Nigel Olsson
- Percussion: Robert Greenidge, Jamey Haddad, Ralph MacDonald, John Mahon, Reginald Toussaint
- Saxophone: Brian Breeze Cayolle, Amy Lee, Tom Mitchell
- Trumpet: Tracy Griffin, John Lovell
- Backing Vocals: Suzanne Bonseigneur, Tina Gullickson, Eddie Russell, Nadirah Shakoor
