= Bob Birch =

American musician (1956–2012)

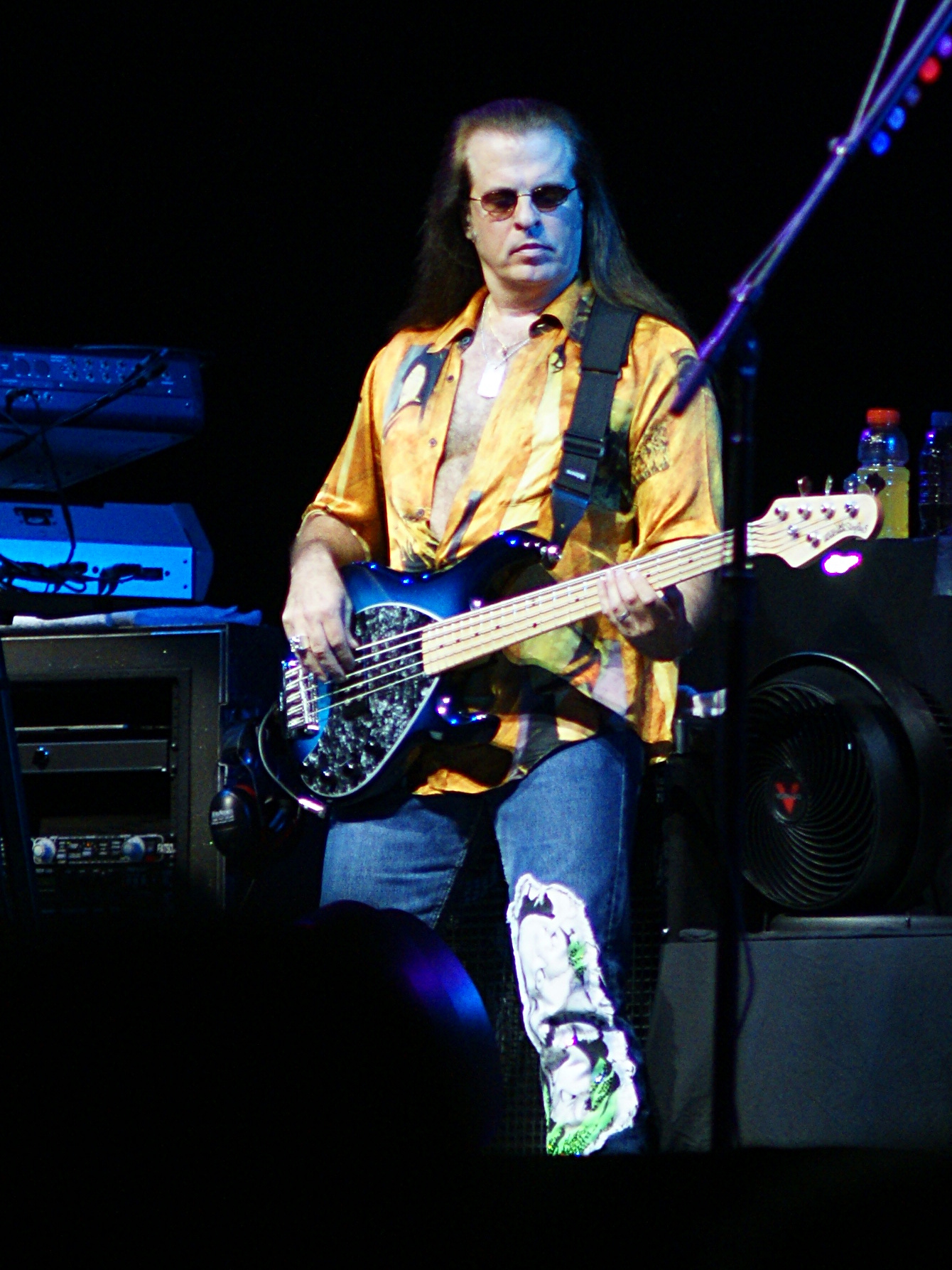
- Birch performing in 2009

Background information
- Born: Robert Wayne Birch; July 14, 1956; Detroit, Michigan, U.S.
- Died: August 15, 2012 (aged 56) Los Angeles, California, U.S.
- Occupation: Musician
- Instruments: Bass, backing vocals
- Formerly of: Elton John, Warpipes

Robert Wayne Birch (July 14, 1956 – August 15, 2012) was an American musician, best known as the bass player for Elton John.

== Early life ==
Bob Birch was born in Detroit and grew up in suburban Sterling Heights and St. Clair Shores, Michigan. At an early age, he was inspired to pursue music by his father Chet, an upright bassist. Birch began playing the alto saxophone and mirroring the styles of Paul Desmond and Cannonball Adderley. Around seventh grade, he tried the electric bass because of his fascination with the Motown sound, and groups like Chicago and Blood, Sweat, and Tears. He began playing on his junior-high band director's Mosrite bass at lunch breaks. Because he also had a passion for classical music, Birch focused his school studies on the bassoon. He was recognized by the Michigan School Band and Orchestra Association for his wins at music festival competitions and, as a senior at Lakeview High School, he won the Louis Armstrong award.

Birch won a scholarship from the state of Michigan to enroll in Wayne State University, initially as a pre-med student. In 1980, he graduated with a bachelor's degree in music education and performance and then spent some time as a music teacher in the Warren Consolidated Schools district. Through these years, he had been playing at night with his brother Dan in a band called Birch & Co., and in another called Lifeline.

== Career ==
By 1984, Birch was living in Los Angeles, where he joined the band Fortune, playing bass and saxophone on their first album Fortune, an album which is considered a classic in Progressive rock circles. The album was a success in Japan and Europe, and the song "Stacy" was a hit in the US, but the band broke up soon after its release.

Birch met keyboardist Guy Babylon when they worked on the Luis Cardenas's 1986 album, Animal Instinct. In 1987, Babylon recommended Birch for Mark Ashton's band and the two worked on the recording of the 1988 Ashton album Modern Pilgrims. At that time, Babylon was asked to join Elton John's band.

When Elton John ended his tour in 1989, Babylon produced an album for Warpipes, a side band that he had started with John's guitarist, Davey Johnstone, and John's drummer Nigel Olsson. Babylon hired Birch to play on the album, which was released in 1991. Babylon, Johnstone and Olsson were then called to begin working on Elton John's The One. At that point, John had been working with different bass players, including Romeo Williams, David Paton and Pino Palladino, but he had yet to settle on one musician. Birch was asked to join The One Tour, which commenced in May 1992. While he would become a busy session musician when not working with Elton John, Birch would stay with John for the rest of his life.

In 1997, Birch met Marc Bonilla and briefly played with his band Dragonchoir. Through Bonilla, Birch was hired to play with Keith Emerson and Glenn Hughes. He worked with Bonilla on Bobby Gaylor's comedy album, Fuzzatonic Scream, and on the soundtracks of the films The Replacements and The Scorpion King. Bonilla included a track featuring Birch on his 2019 album Celluloid Debris. With his 2022 album Deeper Than My Roots, Davey Johnstone would do the same.

During the Elton John and Billy Joel's Face to Face 1994 tour, Birch met Joel's saxophone player Mark Rivera. In 1997, Rivera asked him to play at the inaugural Rock & Roll Fantasy Camp in Miami Beach, where Birch played with Rivera, Leslie West and Liberty DeVitto. In 1999, Birch was part of Edgar Winter's opening band at the Montreaux Jazz Festival. He also built a relationship with producer and songwriter David Harris, through which he did session work on several Contemporary Christian music albums. Birch's last album was Remember, released by Micky Dolenz in 2012.

== Injury ==
In 1995, Birch was struck by a pick-up truck while walking along the street in Montreal. He broke both of his legs and two vertebrae in his back. He was left in constant pain, and dealt with headaches, dizziness, and vertigo. According to his friend and colleague Nigel Olsson, he "saw hundreds of physicians, but nothing could reverse the damage. His entire body was knackered." At the beginning of his final Elton John tour, Birch had a fall which exacerbated his back pain; he had to perform while seated.

== Personal life and death ==
Birch was married and had one son.

During the last weeks of his life, he struggled with severe gastrointestinal issues brought on by his injury, losing over 20 pounds in a short period of time. On August 15, 2012, he died in an apparent suicide by gunshot wound near his Los Angeles home, at age 56.

Upon learning of his death, Elton John released a statement saying that he was “devastated and shocked” by the loss of his friend. "To me Bob was family”, he said. “He had been a member of my band for 20 years; we played over 1400 concerts together. He was one of the greatest musicians I have ever worked with, and in all our years on the road he never played or sang a bad note. I cannot find the words to describe this tragic death, and how much I loved him. May he rest in peace.”

== Discography ==
- Fortune – Fortune, 1985
- Luis Cardenas – Animal Instinct, 1986
- Mark Ashton – Modern Pilgrims, 1988
- Jerry Williams And Harvest – Let's Fight For A Generation, 1991
- Warpipes – Holes In The Heavens, 1991
- The Inheritance – The Inheritance, 1991
- Pocket Change Featuring David Patt – Intimate Notions, 1991
- Elton John – Live in Barcelona, 1992 (video)
- Pocket Change Featuring David Patt – Mediterranean Affair, 1993
- Elton John – Europe 1992, 1994
- Gianni Bella – Vocalist, 1994
- The Glory of Gershwin, 1994
- Daniel Ryan – Daniel Ryan, 1995
- Ghosts of the Open Road – Ghosts of the Open Road, 1995
- Pocket Change Featuring David Patt – Higher Altitude, 1995
- Elton John – Made in England, 1995
- Warpipes – War Pipes, 1995
- Diego Torres – Luna Nueva, 1996
- The Inheritance – Southwest, 1996
- Chill Factor – Some Like It Cold, 1996
- Graeme Revell – The Craft: The Original Motion Picture Score, 1996
- Paul Ventimiglia - Il Bacio, 1997
- Lauren Wood – Lauren Wood, 1997
- The Hellecasters – Hell III: New Axes To Grind, 1997
- Elton John – The Big Picture, 1997
- Kerry Moy – East West, 1998
- Heather Sullivan – Sturdy, 1998
- Divas Live '99, 1999
- Connie Salazar – Journey Of Faith, 1999
- Bobby Gaylor – Fuzzatonic Scream, 2000
- Elton John – Elton John One Night Only – The Greatest Hits, 2000
- Phil Keaggy – Zion, 2000
- Elton John – The Road To El Dorado soundtrack, 2000
- John Debney – The Replacements soundtrack, 2000
- Mercy Malick – Just Be, 2001
- John Debney – The Scorpion King soundtrack, 2002
- Elton John – Live at the Royal Opera House (video), 2002
- Heather Sullivan - Bound, 2003
- Ryan Malcolm – Home, 2003
- David Sneddon – Seven Years – Ten Weeks, 2003
- David Patt & Peggy Duquesnel – Tropical Breezes, 2003
- Elton John – Elton In 2003, 2003
- Elton John – Peachtree Road, 2004
- Elton John – Dream Ticket, 2004
- Liberty N' Justice – Welcome To The Revolution, 2004
- B. B. King – B. B. King & Friends: 80, 2005
- Steve Archer – Call it Grace, 2005
- From the Big Apple to the Big Easy, 2005
- Elton John – The Captain & the Kid, 2006
- Goin' Home: A Tribute to Fats Domino, 2007
- Keith Emerson, Glenn Hughes & Marc Bonilla – Boys Club, Live From California, 2007
- Joseph Williams – This Fall, 2008
- Elton John – Gnomeo & Juliet (soundtrack) (2011)
- Elton John – Elton 60 – Live at Madison Square Garden, 2007
- Christina & The Whipping Boys – Christina & The Whipping Boys, 2007
- Elton John – The Red Piano, 2008
- Elton John – Elton John In Japan, 2008
- Elton John – Live 2009 - Gloucestershire County Cricket Club, 2009
- Keith Emerson – Keith Emerson Band Featuring Marc Bonilla, 2008
- Micky Dolenz – Remember, 2012
- Marc Bonilla – Celluloid Debris, 2019
- The Davey Johnstone Band – Deeper Than My Roots, 2022
