= Plastic Penny =

UK musical group (1967–1969)

- Origin: United Kingdom
- Genres: Pop; psychedelic pop
- Years active: 1967–1969
- Label: Page One
- Past members: Brian Keith; Paul Raymond; Mick Graham; Nigel Olsson; Tony Murray

Plastic Penny were a British 1960s pop band, formed in November 1967 before splitting up in August 1969. The group had one hit single early in 1968: "Everything I Am". Most of the members went on to greater fame with other bands or in session work.

== Career ==
Most of the band's material was psychedelic pop, with leanings towards a prog rock sound. The majority of the material was written by Brian Keith, Paul Raymond, and Tony Murray. Keith left the band, and Raymond took over lead vocals. Plastic Penny's output was released on the Page One Records; the band appeared at the first Isle of Wight Festival, on 31 August 1968.

"Everything I Am" reached number six in the UK Singles Chart and number 30 in Canada. The song, enhanced with a string arrangement, was a slow ballad version of a song originally recorded by the Box Tops. It was written by Spooner Oldham and Dan Penn. Plastic Penny's follow-up singles, such as the Bill Martin/Phil Coulter song "Nobody Knows It", were flops.

Mick Grabham (then billed as Mick Graham) moved on to play with Cochise and then Procol Harum. Keith became the lead vocalist with The Congregation. Raymond replaced Christine Perfect (Christine McVie) in Chicken Shack, then joined Savoy Brown and later played with UFO. Nigel Olsson became the drummer for Elton John and an in-demand session musician. Tony Murray played on Elton John’s Empty Sky with Olsson, and then joined The Troggs.

The group's third and final album Heads I Win, Tails You Lose was a compilation of the band's more obscure recordings, issued in 1970 after the group had disbanded.

== Band members ==
- Brian Keith, (born Brian O'Shea, 22 September 1936, Port Glasgow, West Renfrewshire, Scotland – died August 12, 2025, Eureka, South Dakota) - Vocalist
- Paul Raymond, (born Paul Martin Raymond, 16 November 1945, St Albans, Hertfordshire – 13 April 2019) - Keyboardist/guitarist
- Mick Graham, (born Michael Grabham, 22 January 1948, Sunderland, County Durham) - Guitarist
- Nigel Olsson, (born Peter Nigel Olsson, 10 February 1949, Wallasey, Cheshire) - Drummer
- Tony Murray, (born Anthony Murray, 26 April 1943, Dublin, County Dublin, Ireland) - Bassist

== Discography ==
=== Singles ===
- 1967 - "Everything I Am" / "No Pleasure Without Pain My Love" (Page One POF 051, UK, 1 December 1967)
- 1968 - "Nobody Knows It" / "Happy Just to Be with You" (Page One POF 062, UK, 29 March 1968)
- 1968 - "Your Way to Tell Me Go" / "Baby You're Not to Blame" (Page One POF 079, UK, 26 July 1968)
- 1968 - "Hound Dog" / "Currency" (Page One POF 107, UK, 22 November 1968)
- 1969 - "She Does" / "Genevieve" (Page One POF 146, UK, 11 July 1969)
- 1975 - "Everything I Am" / "No Pleasure Without Pain" (DJM DJS 353, UK, 21 February 1975)

=== Albums ===
- 1968 - Two Sides of a Penny (Page One POL 005 (mono)/POLS 005 (stereo), UK, April 1968)

Side One (Heads): "Everything I Am", "Wake Me Up", "Never My Love", "Genevieve", "No Pleasure Without Pain My Love", "So Much Older Now"
Side Two (Tails): "Mrs. Grundy", "Take Me Back", "I Want You", "It's a Good Thing", "Strawberry Fields Forever"

- 1969 - Currency (Page One POLS 014 (stereo), UK, February 1969)

Side One: "Your Way to Tell Me Go", "Hound Dog", "Currency", "Caledonian Mission", "MacArthur Park"
Side Two: "Turn to Me", "Baby You're Not to Blame", "Give Me Money", "Sour Suite"

- 1970 - Heads I Win, Tails You Lose (Compilation, Page One POS 611 (stereo), UK, April 1970)

Side One: "Hound Dog", "She Does", "Turn to Me", "Caledonian Mission", "Currency", "Your Way to Tell Me Go"
Side Two: "Celebrity Ball", "Baby You're Not to Blame", "I Want You", "Take Me Back", "Genevieve", "Give Me Money"
