= Simple Life (Elton John song) =

1992 single by Elton John

- UK 7-inch single

Single by Elton John

from the album The One
- B-side: "The Last Song" (UK); "The North" (US)
- Released: 1993
- Length: 6:32 (album version); 4:57 (single version)
- Label: Rocket; MCA
- Songwriters: Elton John; Bernie Taupin
- Producer: Chris Thomas

Elton John singles chronology
"The Last Song" (1992)	"Simple Life" (1993)	"True Love" (1993)

Music video
- "Simple Life" on YouTube

"Simple Life" is a song written by British musician Elton John and lyricist Bernie Taupin, performed by John. It was released in 1993 by Rocket and MCA as the final single from John's twenty-third studio album The One (1992). The song was John's thirteenth number one on the US Billboard Adult Contemporary chart and reached number 30 on the Billboard Hot 100. It also peaked at number three on Canada's RPM 100 Hit Tracks chart and topped the RPM Adult Contemporary chart for three weeks. This song's appearance in the US top 40 set a record, as John had achieved a top-40 hit for 24 consecutive years, breaking the old record of 23 years set by Elvis Presley in 1977.

John regularly performed "Simple Life" at his concerts from 1992 to 1998. He often paired the song with "The One".

== Critical reception ==
Pan-European magazine Music & Media commented in their review of "Simple Life", "How does he manage it, to come up with a strong song time after time? The "Once Upon A Time"-like wailing harmonica almost cuts out your heart. All proceeds will go to various charities."

== Music video ==
The accompanying music video for "Simple Life" was directed by Australian film director Russell Mulcahy. It features John singing from inside a cube in the middle of a stadium, which slowly rotates and shows people dancing around the cube.

== Formats and pressings ==
The single version of "Simple Life" has a faster tempo, more defined drumbeat, more harmonica, less synthesised bass, and over ninety seconds shorter. It also omits the chorus after the second verse.

- UK 7-inch single
1. "Simple Life" (edit)
2. "The Last Song"
- US 7-inch and cassette single
1. "Simple Life" (hot mix) – 4:59
2. "The North" – 5:14

== Charts ==
=== Weekly charts ===
Chart (1993)	Peak position
Australia (ARIA)	122
Canada Top Singles (RPM)	3
Canada Adult Contemporary (RPM)	1
Europe (European Hit Radio)	16
Germany (GfK)	63
UK Singles (Official Charts)	44
UK Airplay (Music Week)	8
US Billboard Hot 100	30
US Adult Contemporary (Billboard)	1
US Pop Airplay (Billboard)	17
US Cash Box Top 100	18

=== Year-end charts ===
Chart (1993)	Position
Brazil (Crowley)	68
Canada Top Singles (RPM)	35
Canada Adult Contemporary (RPM)	16
US Adult Contemporary (Billboard)	13

== Release history ==
Region	Date	Format(s)	Label(s)	Ref.
United States	1993	7-inch vinyl; cassette	MCA	
Australia	19 April 1993	CD; cassette	Rocket	
United Kingdom	10 May 1993	7-inch vinyl; CD; cassette	Rocket	
