= Rick Wills =

British bassist (born 1947)

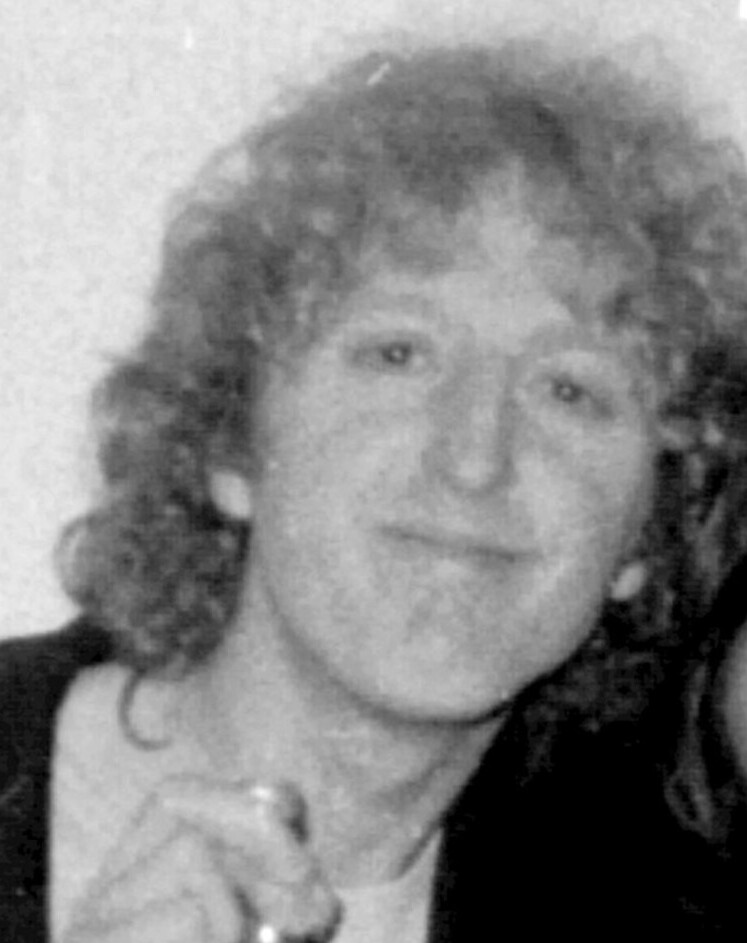
- Wills in 1978

Background information
- Born: Richard William Wills; 5 December 1947 (age 78); Cambridge, England
- Genres: Rock
- Occupation: Bassist
- Years active: 1966–present
- Formerly of: Foreigner; Bad Company; Jokers Wild; The Jones Gang; Small Faces; Roxy Music

Richard William Wills (born 5 December 1947) is an English bass guitarist. He is best known for his work with the rock band Foreigner and his associations with the Small Faces, Roxy Music, Peter Frampton, Spooky Tooth, David Gilmour, Bad Company and The Jones Gang.

== Career ==
Rick Wills played in the early days of rock music in Cambridge, from c. 1961 in the Vikings, then in a succession of local bands: the Sundowners, Soul Committee, Bullitt (with David Gilmour on guitar and John 'Willie' Wilson on drums) and Cochise before joining Frampton's Camel.

Wills joined the rock band Jokers Wild in mid-1966, (with David Gilmour on guitars and vocals), until they broke up in 1967. He played bass on Peter Frampton's first three albums before parting from Frampton in 1975. He became the bassist with Roxy Music in 1976, before leaving them and joining the Small Faces in 1977, during their reunion period. He left the Small Faces and appeared on David Gilmour's eponymous album in 1978, with Willie Wilson on drums. The next year, Wills became a member of rock band Foreigner and remained with them for 14 years. At that time he was the longest-tenured bass player of Foreigner, though was later surpassed by Jeff Pilson.

After leaving Foreigner in 1992, he joined Bad Company and stayed with them until Boz Burrell rejoined the band in 1998. In July 1999 he filled in for Lynyrd Skynyrd bassist Leon Wilkeson for live shows when Wilkeson briefly became ill. He appeared at The Steve Marriott Memorial Concert on 24 April 2001, as part of a backing band with Bobby Tench, Zak Starkey and Rabbit Bundrick.

Wills was reunited with Small Faces drummer Kenney Jones in The Jones Gang during 2006, and appeared with the RD Crusaders for the Teenage Cancer Trust at The London International Music Show on 15 June 2008. Wills left The Jones Gang in the summer of 2015 and was replaced by Pat Davey.

On 12 January 2015, in Sarasota, Florida, Wills and original drummer Dennis Elliott joined Foreigner on stage to play "Headknocker".

On 28 October 2021, Wills joined a Mick Jones-less Foreigner for a three song encore at the Hampton Casino Ballroom in Hampton, New Hampshire.

On 4 August 2023, Wills again rejoined Foreigner for a few songs at the Bank of New Hampshire Pavilion in Gilford, New Hampshire, having recently moved to Amherst, New Hampshire.

In 2024, Wills was inducted into the Rock and Roll Hall of Fame, as a member of Foreigner.

== Discography ==
Cochise

- Cochise (1970)
- Swallow Tales (1971)
- So Far (1972)
- Past Loves (A History) (1992) - Compilation
- Velvet Mountain: An Anthology 1970-1972 (2013) - Compilation Double Album

With Peter Frampton

- Wind of Change - A&M (1972)
- Frampton's Camel – A&M (1973)
- Somethin's Happening – A&M (1974)

With Roxy Music

- Viva! – Atco (1976)

With Kevin Ayers 1976

- Yes We Have No Mañanas (So Get Your Mañanas Today)

With The Small Faces

- Playmates – Atlantic (1977)
- 78 in the Shade – Atlantic (1978)

With David Gilmour

- David Gilmour – Harvest (1978)

With Foreigner

- Head Games – Atlantic (1979)
- 4 – Atlantic (1981)
- Agent Provocateur – Atlantic (1984)
- Inside Information – Atlantic (1987)
- Unusual Heat – Atlantic (1991)

With Bad Company

- What You Hear Is What You Get: The Best of Bad Company – Atco (1993)
- Company of Strangers – Elektra (1995)
- Stories Told & Untold – Elektra (1997)

With The Jones Gang

- Any Day Now - AAO Music (2005)
