= The Bridge (Elton John song) =

Promotional single by Elton John

from the album The Captain & the Kid
- Released: 2006
- Recorded: 2006
- Length: 3:38
- Label: Universal
- Songwriters: Elton John; Bernie Taupin

"The Bridge" is a song by British musician Elton John and lyricist Bernie Taupin, performed by John. It is from John's 2006 album The Captain & the Kid. It is a simple, stripped-down production focused on John and his piano, with sparse further accompaniment. The song, which was only released as a promotional single, peaked at No. 19 on Billboard's Hot Adult Contemporary Tracks.

== Synopsis ==
Before playing the song at a concert in Atlantic City, New Jersey on 7 October 2006, John introduced it as a song that can "apply to anyone" at any time in their lives and having to move on instead of living in the past.

== Charts ==
=== Weekly charts ===
Chart (2006)	Peak position
US Adult Contemporary (Billboard)	19

=== Year-end charts ===
Chart (2006)	Position
US Adult Contemporary (Billboard)	40

== Musical development ==
The song is in the key of D♭ and in 4/4 time.

The instrumental features John and his piano, accompanied by harmonies performed by the rest of the band members.
