= Runaway Train (Elton John and Eric Clapton song) =

1992 single by Elton John and Eric Clapton

Single by Elton John and Eric Clapton

from the album The One and Lethal Weapon 3 soundtrack
- B-side: "Understanding Women" (extended mix)
- Released: 20 July 1992
- Length: 5:23
- Label: Rocket
- Songwriters: Elton John; Bernie Taupin; Olle Romo
- Producer: Chris Thomas

Elton John singles chronology
| "The One" (1992) | "Runaway Train" (1992) | "The Last Song" (1992) |

Eric Clapton singles chronology
| "It's Probably Me" (1992) | "Runaway Train" (1992) | "Layla" (1992) |

"Runaway Train" is a song by British musicians Elton John and Eric Clapton. It was released in July 1992 by Rocket as the second single from John's 23rd studio album, The One (1992), and was later accompanied by a music video shot the same year. It was also used in the Lethal Weapon 3 film soundtrack.

== Writing and recording ==
The music for the song was written by Elton John and Olle Romo while the lyrics were written by John's long-time collaborator Bernie Taupin. For the recording of his instrumental part, John used the Roland RD-1000 digital piano. Eric Clapton sings a duet with John for this track. Clapton takes the main singing part and improvised a couple guitar solos while recording. The song is in the key of G minor. For the studio recordings, Clapton used a capo on the third guitar fret, but never used it for live performances when John and Clapton went on tour in 1992.

== Release and promotion ==
The song was released on 20 July 1992 as the second single of John's studio album, The One, and from the Lethal Weapon 3 soundtrack. Then, it was available for several European countries. A music video to accompany the single was released in late 1992. It consists of video snippets while Clapton and John are performing the song during the Eric Clapton World Tour in London's Wembley Stadium.

== Track listings ==
- Maxi-CD single
1. "Runaway Train" – 5:23
2. "Aretha & Elton – Through The Storm" – 4:21
3. "George Michael & Elton John – Don't Let The Sun Go Down On Me" – 5:49
4. "Elton John & Cliff Richard – Slow Rivers" – 3:10
- 7-inch vinyl single
1. "Runaway Train" – 5:23
2. "Elton John – Understanding Women" – 9:31

== Personnel ==
Personnel are taken from the single release liner notes.

- Eric Clapton – lead guitar, lead vocals
- Elton John – keyboards, lead vocals
- Olle Romo – drums, percussion, programming
- Davey Johnstone – rhythm guitar
- Guy Babylon – keyboards, programming
- Pino Palladino – bass guitar
- Janice Jamison – backing vocals
- Carole Fredericks – backing vocals
- Beckie Bell – backing vocals

== Charts ==
=== Weekly charts ===
| Chart (1992) | Peak position |
|---|---|
| Australia (ARIA) | 53 |
| Austria (Ö3 Austria Top 40) | 22 |
| Belgium (Ultratop 50 Flanders) | 17 |
| Denmark (IFPI) | 7 |
| Europe (Eurochart Hot 100) | 48 |
| France (SNEP) | 29 |
| Germany (GfK) | 41 |
| Netherlands (Dutch Top 40) | 37 |
| Netherlands (Single Top 100) | 28 |
| Norway (VG-lista) | 28 |
| Switzerland (Schweizer Hitparade) | 15 |
| UK Singles (OCC) | 31 |
| UK Airplay (Music Week) | 21 |
| US Album Rock Tracks (Billboard) | 10 |

=== Year-end charts ===
| Chart (1992) | Position |
|---|---|
| Norway (VG-lista) | 101 |

== Certifications ==
| Region | Certification | Certified units/sales |
|---|---|---|
| Netherlands (NVPI) | Gold | 50,000^{^} |
| Norway (IFPI Norway) | Gold | |
^{^} Shipments figures based on certification alone.

== Release history ==
| Region | Date | Format(s) | Label(s) | Ref. |
|---|---|---|---|---|
| United Kingdom | 20 July 1992 | 7-inch vinyl; CD1; cassette | Rocket | |
| United Kingdom | 27 July 1992 | CD2 | Rocket | |
| Australia | 10 August 1992 | CD; cassette | Rocket | |
| Japan | 26 August 1992 | Mini-CD | Rocket | |
| Japan | 26 September 1992 | Maxi-CD | Rocket | |
