= The One Tour (Elton John) =

1992–93 concert tour by Elton John

- Tour by Elton John
- Poster to the concert in Michigan, USA
- Location: Asia • Europe • North America • Oceania • South America
- Associated album: The One
- Start date: 26 May 1992
- End date: 20 June 1993
- Legs: 7
- No. of shows: 155 in total

Elton John concert chronology
- Sleeping with the Past Tour (1989–90); The One Tour (1992–93); Face to Face 1994 (1994)

Elton John and his band set out on The One Tour just under a month prior to the album's release. The album proved a big success as did the world tour which lasted for two years.

== Tour ==
This was John's first tour since his rehabilitation from drug and alcohol addictions and bulimia in 1990. This is the last tour to feature his Roland RD-1000 digital piano. He would start playing his current Yamaha Disklavier piano shortly after.

The first European leg lasted from 26 May to 21 July visiting 13 countries ending at Barcelona Mini Stadium during the 1992 Summer Olympics. The show, filmed in front of 30,000 fans, was released on VHS and later on DVD.

John and the band then moved on to the United States where The One was a commercial success. John returned to Dodger Stadium for two sold-out shows as well as another two at Shea Stadium. John also played six sold-out shows at Madison Square Garden, playing to approximately 120,000 people over the six shows. He finished the tour with two performances in Mexico, where he had never performed in concert before, and two in Buenos Aires, Argentina. The tour was seen by 3 million people over 130 shows.

The 1993 leg of the tour started with nineteen shows in Australia, four shows in Hong Kong, and two shows in Singapore, where John had never previously performed. The tour when went on to North America and then Europe. It ended in a concert in Istanbul, Turkey at the Istanbul Stadium on 20 June 1993.

As in Europe, John dedicated "The Show Must Go On" to Freddie Mercury and performed this number away from the keyboard, with a hand-held microphone. Also, he dedicated "The Last Song" to the people suffering from AIDS. George Michael appeared at Dodger Stadium performing "Don't Let the Sun Go Down on Me" with John as an encore.

== Tour dates ==
Date	City	Country	Venue	Attendance	Box Office
Europe
26 May 1992	Oslo	Norway	Oslo Spektrum	—N/a	—N/a
27 May 1992	Oslo	Norway	Oslo Spektrum	—N/a	—N/a
29 May 1992	Stockholm	Sweden	Stockholm Olympic Stadium	—N/a	—N/a
31 May 1992	Copenhagen	Denmark	Østerbro Stadium	—N/a	—N/a
1 June 1992	Dortmund	Germany	Westfalenhallen	—N/a	—N/a
2 June 1992	Dortmund	Germany	Westfalenhallen	—N/a	—N/a
4 June 1992	Frankfurt	Germany	Festhalle Frankfurt	—N/a	—N/a
6 June 1992 (Note: The 6 June 1992 concert in Nürburg was part of Rock Am Ring.)	Nürburg	Germany	Nürburgring	—N/a	—N/a
7 June 1992	Bremen	Germany	Weserstadion	—N/a	—N/a
9 June 1992	Munich	Germany	Olympiahalle	—N/a	—N/a
10 June 1992	Munich	Germany	Olympiahalle	—N/a	—N/a
12 June 1992	Munich	Germany	Olympiahalle	—N/a	—N/a
13 June 1992	Vienna	Austria	Prater Stadium	—N/a	—N/a
15 June 1992	Berlin	Germany	Waldbühne	—N/a	—N/a
16 June 1992	Berlin	Germany	Waldbühne	—N/a	—N/a
18 June 1992	Paris	France	Hippodrome de Vincennes	—N/a	—N/a
19 June 1992	Rotterdam	Netherlands	Feijenoord Stadion	—N/a	—N/a
21 June 1992	Sheffield	England	Sheffield Arena	—N/a	—N/a
22 June 1992	Sheffield	England	Sheffield Arena	—N/a	—N/a
26 June 1992	London	England	Wembley Stadium	—N/a	—N/a
27 June 1992	London	England	Wembley Stadium	—N/a	—N/a
28 June 1992	London	England	Wembley Stadium	—N/a	—N/a
30 June 1992	Birmingham	England	National Indoor Arena	—N/a	—N/a
1 July 1992	Brussels	Belgium	Forest National	—N/a	—N/a
3 July 1992	Lausanne	Switzerland	Stade Olympique de la Pontaise	—N/a	—N/a
4 July 1992	Basel	Switzerland	St. Jakob Stadium	—N/a	—N/a
6 July 1992	Bologna	Italy	Stadio Renato Dall'Ara	—N/a	—N/a
8 July 1992	Rome	Italy	Stadio Olimpico	—N/a	—N/a
10 July 1992	Monza	Italy	Stadio Brianteo	—N/a	—N/a
11 July 1992	Nîmes	France	Arena of Nîmes	—N/a	—N/a
12 July 1992	Nîmes	France	Arena of Nîmes	—N/a	—N/a
13 July 1992	Madrid	Spain	Las Ventas	—N/a	—N/a
15 July 1992	Sevilla	Spain	Estadio Benito Villamarín	—N/a	—N/a
16 July 1992	Lisbon	Portugal	Estádio José Alvalade	—N/a	—N/a
18 July 1992	Oviedo	Spain	Estadio Carlos Tartiere	—N/a	—N/a
19 July 1992	A Coruña	Spain	Estadio Riazor	—N/a	—N/a
21 July 1992	Barcelona	Spain	Mini Estadi	—N/a	—N/a
North America
11 August 1992	Atlanta	United States	Lakewood Amphitheater	—N/a	—N/a
12 August 1992	Atlanta	United States	Lakewood Amphitheater	—N/a	—N/a
14 August 1992	Charlotte	United States	Blockbuster Pavilion	—N/a	—N/a
15 August 1992	Raleigh	United States	Walnut Creek Amphitheater	20,601 / 20,601	$508,336
17 August 1992	Cuyahoga Falls	United States	Blossom Music Center	—N/a	—N/a
19 August 1992	Toronto	Canada	Exhibition Stadium	51,056 / 51,056	$1,066,065
21 August 1992	New York City	United States	Shea Stadium	122,388 / 122,388	$4,594,205
22 August 1992	New York City	United States	Shea Stadium	122,388 / 122,388	$4,594,205
24 August 1992	Cincinnati	United States	Riverbend Music Center	—N/a	—N/a
25 August 1992	Cincinnati	United States	Riverbend Music Center	—N/a	—N/a
29 August 1992	Los Angeles	United States	Dodger Stadium	99,453 / 120,174	$3,422,520
30 August 1992	Los Angeles	United States	Dodger Stadium	99,453 / 120,174	$3,422,520
2 September 1992	Greenwood Village	United States	Fiddler's Green Amphitheatre	—N/a	—N/a
4 September 1992	Maryland Heights	United States	Riverport Amphitheatre	20,000 / 20,000	$543,904
6 September 1992	Nashville	United States	Starwood Amphitheatre	—N/a	—N/a
11 September 1992	Hoffman Estates	United States	Poplar Creek Music Theater	—N/a	—N/a
12 September 1992	Hoffman Estates	United States	Poplar Creek Music Theater	—N/a	—N/a
13 September 1992	Burgettstown	United States	Star Lake Amphitheater	21,543 / 21,543	$544,882
15 September 1992	Mansfield	United States	Woods Performing Arts Center	—N/a	—N/a
16 September 1992	Mansfield	United States	Woods Performing Arts Center	—N/a	—N/a
18 September 1992	Mansfield	United States	Woods Performing Arts Center	—N/a	—N/a
19 September 1992	Columbia	United States	Merriweather Post Pavilion	—N/a	—N/a
20 September 1992	Columbia	United States	Merriweather Post Pavilion	—N/a	—N/a
22 September 1992	Philadelphia	United States	The Spectrum	36,437 / 36,437	$1,038,455
23 September 1992	Philadelphia	United States	The Spectrum	36,437 / 36,437	$1,038,455
25 September 1992	Albany	United States	Knickerbocker Arena	—N/a	—N/a
26 September 1992	Syracuse	United States	Carrier Dome	39,082 / 39,082	$1,017,203
1 October 1992	Hartford	United States	Hartford Civic Center	16,365 / 16,365	$446,827
2 October 1992	New York City	United States	Madison Square Garden	113,406 / 113,406	$3,345,477
3 October 1992	New York City	United States	Madison Square Garden	113,406 / 113,406	$3,345,477
5 October 1992	New York City	United States	Madison Square Garden	113,406 / 113,406	$3,345,477
7 October 1992	New York City	United States	Madison Square Garden	113,406 / 113,406	$3,345,477
9 October 1992	New York City	United States	Madison Square Garden	113,406 / 113,406	$3,345,477
10 October 1992	New York City	United States	Madison Square Garden	113,406 / 113,406	$3,345,477
11 October 1992	New York City	United States	Madison Square Garden	113,406 / 113,406	$3,345,477
16 October 1992	Auburn Hills	United States	The Palace of Auburn Hills	41,318 / 41,318	$1,177,593
17 October 1992	Auburn Hills	United States	The Palace of Auburn Hills	41,318 / 41,318	$1,177,593
20 October 1992	The Woodlands	United States	Cynthia Woods Mitchell Pavilion	20,434 / 20,434	$561,517
21 October 1992	The Woodlands	United States	Cynthia Woods Mitchell Pavilion	20,434 / 20,434	$561,517
23 October 1992	Austin	United States	Frank Erwin Center	—N/a	—N/a
24 October 1992	Baton Rouge	United States	LSU Assembly Center	—N/a	—N/a
25 October 1992	Dallas	United States	Starplex Amphitheater	20,111 / 20,111	$540,333
28 October 1992	Phoenix	United States	Desert Sky Pavilion	19,617 / 19,945	$527,236
30 October 1992	Oakland	United States	Oakland–Alameda County Coliseum Arena	—N/a	—N/a
31 October 1992	Sacramento	United States	ARCO Arena	16,015 / 16,015	$440,413
2 November 1992	Inglewood	United States	Great Western Forum	—N/a	—N/a
4 November 1992	Inglewood	United States	Great Western Forum	—N/a	—N/a
13 November 1992	Mexico City	Mexico	Estadio Azteca	180,000 / 180,000	$4,006,410
14 November 1992	Mexico City	Mexico	Estadio Azteca	180,000 / 180,000	$4,006,410
South America
21 November 1992	Buenos Aires	Argentina	River Plate Stadium	—N/a	—N/a
22 November 1992	Buenos Aires	Argentina	River Plate Stadium	—N/a	—N/a
Oceania
13 February 1993	Auckland	New Zealand	Mount Smart Stadium	—N/a	—N/a
16 February 1993	Melbourne	Australia	National Tennis Centre	—N/a	—N/a
17 February 1993	Melbourne	Australia	National Tennis Centre	—N/a	—N/a
19 February 1993	Melbourne	Australia	National Tennis Centre	—N/a	—N/a
20 February 1993	Melbourne	Australia	National Tennis Centre	—N/a	—N/a
23 February 1993	Perth	Australia	Perth Entertainment Centre	—N/a	—N/a
24 February 1993	Perth	Australia	Perth Entertainment Centre	—N/a	—N/a
26 February 1993	Adelaide	Australia	Adelaide Entertainment Centre	—N/a	—N/a
27 February 1993	Adelaide	Australia	Adelaide Entertainment Centre	—N/a	—N/a
1 March 1993	Brisbane	Australia	Brisbane Entertainment Centre	—N/a	—N/a
2 March 1993	Brisbane	Australia	Brisbane Entertainment Centre	—N/a	—N/a
4 March 1993	Sydney	Australia	Sydney Entertainment Centre	73,044 / 77,000	$2,085,746
5 March 1993	Sydney	Australia	Sydney Entertainment Centre	73,044 / 77,000	$2,085,746
6 March 1993	Sydney	Australia	Sydney Entertainment Centre	73,044 / 77,000	$2,085,746
8 March 1993	Sydney	Australia	Sydney Entertainment Centre	73,044 / 77,000	$2,085,746
9 March 1993	Sydney	Australia	Sydney Entertainment Centre	73,044 / 77,000	$2,085,746
11 March 1993	Sydney	Australia	Sydney Entertainment Centre	73,044 / 77,000	$2,085,746
12 March 1993	Sydney	Australia	Sydney Entertainment Centre	73,044 / 77,000	$2,085,746
Asia
16 March 1993	Hong Kong		Hong Kong Coliseum	—N/a	—N/a
17 March 1993	Hong Kong		Hong Kong Coliseum	—N/a	—N/a
19 March 1993	Hong Kong		Hong Kong Coliseum	—N/a	—N/a
20 March 1993	Hong Kong		Hong Kong Coliseum	—N/a	—N/a
23 March 1993	Singapore		Singapore Indoor Stadium	—N/a	—N/a
24 March 1993	Singapore		Singapore Indoor Stadium	—N/a	—N/a
North America
9 April 1993	Landover	United States	Capital Centre	17,384 / 17,384	$512,828
10 April 1993	Philadelphia	United States	The Spectrum	18,426 / 18,988	$525,141
13 April 1993	Montreal	Canada	Montreal Forum	30,452 / 30,452	$866,142
14 April 1993	Montreal	Canada	Montreal Forum	30,452 / 30,452	$866,142
16 April 1993	Boston	United States	Boston Garden	30,311 / 30,311	$888,964
17 April 1993	Boston	United States	Boston Garden	30,311 / 30,311	$888,964
20 April 1993	Fairborn	United States	Nutter Center	11,818 / 11,818	$406,640
21 April 1993	Milwaukee	United States	Bradley Center	18,444 / 18,444	$461,100
23 April 1993	Pittsburgh	United States	Civic Arena	—N/a	—N/a
24 April 1993	Auburn Hills	United States	The Palace of Auburn Hills	20,816 / 20,816	$593,256
25 April 1993	Buffalo	United States	Buffalo Memorial Auditorium	16,697 / 16,697	$442,471
30 April 1993	Lexington	United States	Rupp Arena	—N/a	—N/a
1 May 1993	Knoxville	United States	Thompson–Boling Arena	17,821 / 17,821	$395,266
3 May 1993	Orlando	United States	Orlando Arena	30,232 / 30,232	$848,588
4 May 1993	Orlando	United States	Orlando Arena	30,232 / 30,232	$848,588
5 May 1993	Miami	United States	Miami Arena	—N/a	—N/a
7 May 1993	Chapel Hill	United States	Dean Smith Center	15,262 / 15,262	$375,623
8 May 1993	Atlanta	United States	The Omni	—N/a	—N/a
Europe
12 May 1993	London	England	Earls Court Exhibition Centre	—N/a	—N/a
13 May 1993	London	England	Earls Court Exhibition Centre	—N/a	—N/a
15 May 1993	Dortmund	Germany	Westfalenhallen	—N/a	—N/a
16 May 1993	Dortmund	Germany	Westfalenhallen	—N/a	—N/a
18 May 1993	Ghent	Belgium	Flanders Expo	—N/a	—N/a
19 May 1993	Strasbourg	France	Rhénus Sport	—N/a	—N/a
21 May 1993	Frankfurt	Germany	Festhalle Frankfurt	—N/a	—N/a
22 May 1993	Frankfurt	Germany	Festhalle Frankfurt	—N/a	—N/a
24 May 1993	Paris	France	Palais Omnisports de Paris-Bercy	—N/a	—N/a
25 May 1993	Paris	France	Palais Omnisports de Paris-Bercy	—N/a	—N/a
26 May 1993	Paris	France	Palais Omnisports de Paris-Bercy	—N/a	—N/a
27 May 1993	Paris	France	Palais Omnisports de Paris-Bercy	—N/a	—N/a
30 May 1993	Hanover	Germany	Garbsen	—N/a	—N/a
31 May 1993	Nuremberg	Germany	Frankenstadion	—N/a	—N/a
2 June 1993	Zürich	Switzerland	Hallenstadion	—N/a	—N/a
3 June 1993	Zürich	Switzerland	Hallenstadion	—N/a	—N/a
4 June 1993	Salzburg	Austria	Residenzplatz	—N/a	—N/a
6 June 1993	Milan	Italy	Forum di Assago	—N/a	—N/a
7 June 1993	Barcelona	Spain	Palau Sant Jordi	—N/a	—N/a
8 June 1993	Valencia	Spain	Estadio Luis Casanova	—N/a	—N/a
10 June 1993	Marbella	Spain	Estadio Municipal de Marbella	—N/a	—N/a
12 June 1993	Tenerife	Spain	Estadio Heliodoro Rodríguez López	—N/a	—N/a
Middle East
17 June 1993	Tel Aviv	Israel	Yarkon Park	—N/a	—N/a
Europe
18 June 1993	Athens	Greece	Athens Olympic Stadium	—N/a	—N/a
20 June 1993	Istanbul	Turkey	İnönü Stadium	—N/a	—N/a

== 1992 setlists ==
Standard Early European Sstlist
1. Don't Let the Sun Go Down on Me
2. I'm Still Standing
3. I Guess That's Why They Call It the Blues
4. Philadelphia Freedom
5. Burn Down the Mission
6. Simple Life
7. The One
8. I Don't Wanna Go on with You Like That
9. Mona Lisas and Mad Hatters Parts 1 & 2
10. Sorry Seems to Be the Hardest Word
11. Daniel
12. The Last Song
13. Funeral for a Friend/Love Lies Bleeding
14. Sad Songs (Say So Much)
15. Rocket Man
16. Saturday Nights Alright for Fighting
Standard UK setlist
1. Philadelphia Freedom
2. Burn Down the Mission
3. Simple Life
4. The One
5. I'm Still Standing
6. Mona Lisas and Mad Hatters Parts 1 & 2
7. Sorry Seems to Be the Hardest Word
8. Daniel
9. Blue Avenue
10. Sad Songs (Say So Much)
11. Rocket Man
12. The Show Must Go On
13. Saturday Night's Alright for Fighting
14. Sacrifice
15. Candle in the Wind
Standard Later European setlist
1. Don't Let the Sun Go Down on Me
2. I'm Still Standing
3. I Guess That's Why They Call It the Blues
4. Tiny Dancer
5. Philadelphia Freedom
6. Burn Down the Mission
7. Simple Life
8. The One
9. I Don't Wanna Go on with You Like That
10. Mona Lisas and Mad Hatters Parts 1 & 2
11. Sorry Seems to Be the Hardest Word
12. Daniel
13. Blue Avenue
14. The Last Song
15. Funeral for a Friend/Love Lies Bleeding
16. Sad Songs (Say So Much)
17. The Show Must Go On
18. Saturday Night's Alright for Fighting
19. Sacrifice
20. Song for Guy
21. Your Song
Standard US setlist
1. Don't Let the Sun Go Down on Me
2. I'm Still Standing
3. I Guess That's Why They Call It the Blues
4. Philadelphia Freedom
5. Runaway Train
6. Burn Down the Mission
7. Tiny Dancer
8. Simple Life
9. The One
10. I Don't Wanna Go on with You Like That
11. Mona Lisas and Mad Hatters Parts 1 & 2
12. The Last Song
13. Funeral for a Friend/Love Lies Bleeding
14. Rocket Man
15. All the Girls Love Alice
16. Sad Songs (Say So Much)
17. The Show Must Go On
18. Saturday Night's Alright for Fighting
19. The Bitch Is Back
20. Candle in the Wind
21. Your Song

== 1993 setlists ==
Standard Australasian setlist
1. Intro
2. Don't Let the Sun Go Down on Me
3. I'm Still Standing
4. I Guess That's Why They Call It the Blues
5. Philadelphia Freedom
6. Burn Down the Mission
7. Tiny Dancer
8. Healing Hands
9. Simple Life
10. The One
11. I Don't Wanna Go on with You Like That
12. Mona Lisas and Mad Hatters Parts 1 & 2
13. The Last Song
14. Funeral for a Friend/Love Lies Bleeding
15. Rocket Man
16. All the Girls Love Alice
17. Sad Songs (Say So Much)
18. The Show Must Go On
19. Saturday Night's Alright for Fighting
20. Crocodile Rock
21. The Bitch Is Back
22. Sacrifice
23. Candle in the Wind
24. Song for Guy/Your Song
Standard US setlist
1. Pinball Wizard
2. The Bitch Is Back
3. Take Me to the Pilot
4. I Guess That's Why They Call It the Blues
5. Philadelphia Freedom
6. Empty Garden (Hey Hey Johnny)
7. Simple Life
8. The One
9. I Don't Wanna Go on with You Like That
10. Mona Lisas and Mad Hatters Parts 1 & 2
11. Come Down in Time
12. A Woman's Needs
13. High Flying Bird
14. Captain Fantastic and the Brown Dirt Cowboy
15. Funeral for a Friend/Love Lies Bleeding
16. Rocket Man
17. Bennie and the Jets
18. The Show Must Go On
19. Saturday Night's Alright for Fighting
20. Don't Let the Sun Go Down on Me
21. Candle in the Wind
22. The Last Song
Standard European setlist
1. Pinball Wizard
2. The Bitch Is Back
3. Take Me to the Pilot
4. I Guess That's Why They Call It the Blues
5. Philadelphia Freedom
6. Empty Garden (Hey Hey Johnny)
7. Simple Life
8. The One
9. I Don't Wanna Go on with You Like That
10. Mona Lisas and Mad Hatters Parts 1 & 2
11. Come Down in Time
12. Sorry Seems to Be the Hardest Word
13. The Last Song
14. Funeral for a Friend/Love Lies Bleeding
15. Rocket Man
16. Bennie and the Jets
17. Sad Songs (Say So Much)
18. The Show Must Go On
19. Saturday Night's Alright (For Fighting)
20. Don't Let the Sun Go Down on Me
21. Jumping Jack Flash
22. Your Song
23. Sacrifice

== Personnel ==
- Elton John – Roland RD-1000 digital piano and lead vocals
- Davey Johnstone – guitars/backing vocals
- Bob Birch – bass
- Mark Taylor – keyboards/guitar
- Guy Babylon – keyboards
- Charlie Morgan – drums
- Mortonette Jenkins – backing vocals
- Marlena Jeter – backing vocals
- Natalie Jackson – backing vocals
