= The Captain & the Kid =

Studio album by Elton John
- Released: 18 September 2006
- Recorded: Spring 2006
- Studios: Center Stage (Atlanta, Georgia); Townhouse Studios (London, England)
- Genre: Rock
- Length: 45:59
- Labels: Interscope; Mercury
- Producers: Elton John; Matt Still

Elton John chronology
| Peachtree Road (2004) | The Captain & the Kid (2006) | Rocket Man: The Definitive Hits (2007) |

The Captain & the Kid is the twenty-eighth studio album by British musician Elton John, released in 2006. It is his second autobiographical album with lyricist Bernie Taupin, picking up where Captain Fantastic and the Brown Dirt Cowboy (1975) left off. The Captain & the Kid chronicles the events in their lives over the intervening three decades.

Professional ratings
Aggregate scores
| Source | Rating |
|---|---|
| Metacritic | 69/100 |
Review scores
| Source | Rating |
| AllMusic | 3.5/5 stars |
| The Encyclopedia of Popular Music | 3/5 stars |
| Entertainment Weekly | A− |
| The Independent | 4/5 stars |
| Los Angeles Times | 3/4 stars |
| PopMatters | 4/10 |
| Rolling Stone | 4/5 stars |
| This Is London | 4/5 stars |

The Captain & the Kid reached No. 6 on the UK Albums Chart, a considerable improvement over the performance of John's preceding Peachtree Road in 2004, which peaked at No. 21. Captain reached No. 18 on the US Billboard 200, before quickly falling off the charts. At concerts in early 2007, John made clear his dissatisfaction with Interscope Records' promotion of the album, having threatened to terminate his contract with the label and because of that, John did not release a solo album again until 2013's The Diving Board.

== Background ==
According to Bernie Taupin, Elton John's manager at the time, Merck Mercuriadis, suggested in 2005 that John and Taupin write a follow-up to Captain Fantastic and The Brown Dirt Cowboy.

Interscope Records announced that there would be no physical single released from this album as the emphasis was on presenting the album as a body of work, making the album his third after Tumbleweed Connection and Leather Jackets to lack any Top 40 singles on the UK singles chart (as John, during that time, still hit the Top 40 in the US Adult Contemporary chart).

However, a radio single would be released in "The Bridge". The album's booklet has photos of John and Taupin all throughout their career, and in the lyrics section, two songs are included, "Across the River Thames" and "12", which do not appear on the album. "Across the River Thames" was available as a free download to anyone who played the CD on a computer. The song "And the House Fell Down" is based (metaphorically) on the story The Three Little Pigs. This is the first album recorded by John and Taupin to show them together on the front cover.

It was also the last studio album to feature Guy Babylon on keyboards; he died in 2009. This was also Bob Birch's last appearance on any of John's solo studio albums before his own death in August 2012 (Birch last appeared on the Gnomeo and Juliet soundtrack).

== Track listing ==
All tracks are written by Elton John and Bernie Taupin.

Side one
| No. | Title | Length |
|---|---|---|
| 1. | "Postcards from Richard Nixon" | 5:15 |
| 2. | "Just Like Noah's Ark" | 5:33 |
| 3. | "Wouldn't Have You Any Other Way (NYC)" | 4:38 |
| 4. | "Tinderbox" | 4:25 |
| 5. | "And the House Fell Down" | 4:48 |

Side two
| No. | Title | Length |
|---|---|---|
| 6. | "Blues Never Fade Away" | 4:45 |
| 7. | "The Bridge" | 3:38 |
| 8. | "I Must Have Lost It on the Wind" | 3:53 |
| 9. | "Old '67" | 4:01 |
| 10. | "The Captain and the Kid" | 5:03 |
| Total length: | | 45:59 |

UK bonus track and download
| No. | Title | Length |
|---|---|---|
| 11. | "Across the River Thames" | 4:31 |
| Total length: | | 50:30 |

== Other bonus tracks ==
| Song | Availability |
|---|---|
| "Someone Saved My Life Tonight" (live) | Best Buy (CD included download link)/iTunes |
| "We All Fall in Love Sometimes/Curtains" (live) | Best Buy (CD included download link) |
| "Tell Me When the Whistle Blows" (live) | iTunes |
| "(Gotta Get a) Meal Ticket" (live) | iTunes |
| "Better Off Dead" (live) | iTunes |

== Personnel ==
=== Musicians ===
- Elton John – vocals, acoustic piano
- Guy Babylon – keyboards, arrangements
- Davey Johnstone – guitars, banjo, mandolin, harmonica, backing vocals, musical director
- Bob Birch – bass, backing vocals
- Nigel Olsson – drums, backing vocals
- John Mahon – percussion, backing vocals
- Matt Still – backing vocals
- Arthur – "woof-bells"

Producer Matt Still noted during an interview that in "Just Like Noah's Ark", John's black and white spaniel dog Arthur "barked in the middle of [the recording], because John Mahon was playing a cowbell, and the cowbell freaked him out. So he ran over to John and started barking at him right in the middle of a take. It's funny, just randomly he happened to hit the beats and he barked in time. So I recorded it and we actually kept him in there."

The sampled "woof-bells" can be heard in place of the cowbell on the track.

=== Production ===
- Elton John – producer
- Matt Still – producer, recording, mixing
- Tom Rickert – assistant engineer
- Dan Porter – assistant mix engineer
- Bob Ludwig – mastering at Gateway Mastering (Portland, Maine)
- Adrian Collee – studio coordinator
- Bob Halley – director of Ops
- Rick Salazar – guitar technician
- Chris Sobchack – drum technician
- Andy Williams – piano tuner
- John Antenucci – studio manager for Center Stage
- Lucy Lawler – studio administrator
- Kent Smith – production manager
- Ryan McGinley – cover photography
- David Costa – art direction, design
- Keith Bradley – management
- Merck Mercuriadis – management
- Frank Presland – management

== Charts ==
Chart performance for The Captain & the Kid
| Chart (2006) | Peak position |
|---|---|
| Australian Albums (ARIA) | 37 |
| Austrian Albums (Ö3 Austria) | 37 |
| Belgian Albums (Ultratop Wallonia) | 99 |
| Danish Albums (Hitlisten) | 26 |
| Dutch Albums (Album Top 100) | 43 |
| French Albums (SNEP) | 56 |
| German Albums (Offizielle Top 100) | 25 |
| Italian Albums (FIMI) | 21 |
| Japanese Albums Chart | 100 |
| Norwegian Albums (VG-lista) | 10 |
| Scottish Albums (Official Charts) | 8 |
| Spanish Albums (Promusicae) | 52 |
| Swedish Albums (Sverigetopplistan) | 27 |
| Swiss Albums (Schweizer Hitparade) | 10 |
| UK Albums (Official Charts) | 6 |
| US Billboard 200 | 18 |
| US Indie Store Album Sales (Billboard) | 14 |
| US Top Alternative Albums (Billboard) | 7 |

== Certifications ==
| Region | Certification | Certified units/sales |
|---|---|---|
| United Kingdom (BPI) | Silver | 60,000^{^} |
^{^} Shipments figures based on certification alone.
