= B. B. King & Friends: 80 =

Studio album by B. B. King
- Released: September 13, 2005
- Genre: Blues, R&B, soul
- Length: 54:29
- Label: Geffen

B. B. King chronology
| The Ultimate Collection (2005) | B. B. King & Friends: 80 (2005) | The Best of the Early Years (2007) |

Professional ratings
Review scores
| Source | Rating |
|---|---|
| AllMusic | 2.5/5 stars |
| The Penguin Guide to Blues Recordings | 2.5/4 stars |

B. B. King & Friends: 80 is the forty-first album by B.B. King, released in 2005. Recorded in several studios, it celebrates King's 80th birthday and features duets with a variety of musicians. 80 reached No. 45 in the Billboard 200 top albums chart as well as No. 1 in the blues albums chart.

== Grammy Awards ==
The album won the Grammy Award for Best Traditional Blues Album at the 48th Annual Grammy Awards on February 8, 2006.

== Track listing ==
1. B. B. King & Van Morrison - "Early in the Morning" (4:50)
2. B. B. King & Billy Gibbons - "Tired of Your Jive" (3:53)
3. B. B. King & Eric Clapton - "The Thrill is Gone" (5:03)
4. B. B. King & Sheryl Crow - "Need Your Love So Bad" (3:58)
5. B. B. King & Daryl Hall - "Ain't Nobody Home" (3:52)
6. B. B. King & John Mayer - "Hummingbird" (4:42)
7. B. B. King & Mark Knopfler - "All Over Again" (4:54)
8. B. B. King & Glenn Frey - "Drivin' Wheel" (4:20)
9. B. B. King & Gloria Estefan - "There Must Be a Better World Somewhere" (6:50)
10. B. B. King & Roger Daltrey - "Never Make Your Move Too Soon" (4:59)
11. B. B. King & Bobby Bland - "Funny How Time Slips Away" (4:09)
12. B. B. King & Elton John - "Rock This House" (3:07)

== Personnel ==
- Guitar: Clem Clempson, Larry Campbell, Davey Johnstone, Dean Parks
- Bass: Bob Birch, Yolanda Charles, Leland Sklar, T-Bone Wolk
- Keyboards – Brian Mitchell, Robbie Buchanan, Luke Smith, Chris Stainton
- Drums – Guy Babylon, Russ Kunkel, Nigel Olsson, Ian Thomas, Billy Ward
- Percussion: Nathaniel Kunkel, John Mahon
- Saxophone – Brandon Fields
- Trombone – Bill Reichenbach Jr.
- Trumpet – Gary Grant, Jerry Hey

== Studios ==
- Avatar Studios, New York City
- Caesars Palace Showroom, Las Vegas, Nevada
- Conway Recording Studios, Los Angeles
- O'Henry Studios, Burbank, California
- Ocean Way Recording
- Olympic Studios, London
- Right Track Recording, New York City
