= The Best of the Early Years (B. B. King album) =

The Best of the Early Years (album)

Greatest hits album by B.B. King
- Released: January 29, 2007
- Genre: Blues
- Length: 75:00
- Label: Ace
- Producer: Roger Armstrong (Compilation)

B.B. King chronology
B.B. King & Friends: 80 (2005)	The Best of the Early Years (album) (2007)	Forever Gold: B. B. King Live (2007)

Professional ratings
Review scores
Source	Rating
Allmusic	5/5 stars

The Best of the Early Years is a 2007 Blues compilation album by B.B. King. This "Best of" collection was created from master recordings from King's works from the 1950s and 1960s.

== Track listing ==
1. "B.B. Boogie"
2. "She's Dynamite"
3. "Shake It Up and Go"
4. "3 O'Clock Blues"
5. "Please Love Me"
6. "Woke Up This Morning"
7. "You Upset Me Baby"
8. "Every Day I Have the Blues"
9. "When My Heart Beats Like a Hammer"
10. "Ten Long Years"
11. "Sweet Little Angel"
12. "Don't Look Now, But I've Got the Blues"
13. "Early in the Morning"
14. "Days of Old"
15. "Mean Old Frisco"
16. "Catfish Blues a.k.a. Fishin' After Me"
17. "Sweet Sixteen Pts 1&2"
18. "I'll Survive"
19. "Downhearted a.k.a. How Blue Can You Get?"
20. "Bad Case of Love"
21. "Rock Me Baby"
22. "Blues Stay Away from Me"
23. "Five Long Years"
24. "That Evil Child"
25. "Why I Sing the Blues"
