= Hummingbird (1955 song) =

Song
- Released: 1955
- Songwriter(s): Don Robertson

"Hummingbird" is a popular song written by Don Robertson released in 1955. The best-known version of the song was the recording by Les Paul and Mary Ford (recorded July 9, 1955; Capitol Records catalog number 3165). This version reached #7 on the Billboard chart. It was also recorded at about the same time by Frankie Laine (Columbia Records catalog number 40526, reaching #17 on the chart) and by The Chordettes (Cadence Records catalog number 1267). On the Cash Box magazine Best-Selling Record chart, where all versions were combined, the song reached #6 in 1955.

== Other works by the same name ==
- "Hummingbird" by Leon Russell - a solo written and recorded by Russell on his self-titled album Leon Russell (1970) and on the Joe Cocker album Mad Dogs and Englishman (also 1970). It was later recorded by B.B. King solo and over the years with others, such as with John Mayer on the album B. B. King & Friends: 80 (2005) and with Russell and former Eagles guitarist Joe Walsh on the B.B. King disc His Definitive Greatest Hits (1999). Another version of this song appears on the former Led Zeppelin guitarist Jimmy Page solo album Outrider (1988). Joe Bonamassa has covered the song, including a version on his "Live at Carnegie Hall" CD and Blu-ray.
- "Hummingbird" by Tim Easton - written by Tim Easton, on the album Break Your Mother's Heart (2003).
- "Hummingbird" by Jeff Tweedy - written by Jeff Tweedy, the song appears on the Wilco discs A Ghost is Born (2004) and Kicking Television: Live in Chicago (2005). It ranks as the fifth most popular song written by Tweedy (as of 2009).
