= Dancin' Shoes =

Single by Nigel Olsson

from the album Nigel
- B-side: "Living in a Fantasy"
- Released: December 1978
- Genre: Soft rock
- Length: 3:45
- Label: Bang
- Songwriter: Carl Storie
- Producer: Paul Davis

Nigel Olsson singles chronology
"Say Goodbye to Hollywood" (1978)	"Dancin' Shoes" (1978)	"Little Bit of Soap" (1979)

"Dancin' Shoes" is a song written by Carl Storie and performed by Nigel Olsson. It reached No. 8 on the U.S. adult contemporary chart and No. 18 on the Billboard pop chart in 1979. The song was featured on his 1979 album, Nigel.

The song was produced by Paul Davis.

The single ranked No. 96 on Billboard's Year-End Hot 100 singles of 1979.

== Charts ==
=== Weekly charts ===
Chart (1979)	Peak position
Australia (Kent Music Report)	62

=== Year-end charts ===
Year-end chart (1979)	Rank
US Top Pop Singles (Billboard)	96

== Other versions ==
- Storie's band, Faith Band, released a version of the song as a single in 1978 at the same time as Olsson's that reached No. 54 on the Billboard Hot 100.
- Hughie Thomasson released a version of the song on his 1999 album, So Low.
