= Dream Ticket (video) =

2004 video album by Elton John

Live album by Elton John
- Released: 2004
- Recorded: 1972–2004
- Length: 7 hours
- Label: Mercury Records, Universal Music Group
- Producer: Todd Interland; Phil Ramone (music)

Dream Ticket is a four-disc DVD release of Elton John, compiling three concerts and an additional bonus disc of music videos. The project was produced by Interland Music and Phil Ramone, and directed by David Mallett. It was released in 2004.

The release of the videos coincided with the release of the book Dream Ticket: Elton John Across Four Decades, co-written by John and British journalist Paul Flynn.

== Disc One: New York City (Madison Square Garden): Greatest Hits - One Night Only, October 21st, 2000 ==
Elton and his band play some of his greatest hits at New York City's Madison Square Garden as part of the One Night Only concerts with special guests Billy Joel, Bryan Adams, Mary J. Blige, Kiki Dee, Anastacia, and Ronan Keating.

== Disc Two: London: The Royal Opera House, December 1st, 2000 ==
John and his band are accompanied by London's Royal Academy of Music Orchestra and Choir, performing a rare concert at the legendary Royal Opera House, with songs that include "Take Me to the Pilot", "Don't Let the Sun Go Down on Me", "Burn Down the Mission", "Philadelphia Freedom", and his second single on Songs from the West Coast, "This Train Don't Stop There Anymore".

== Disc Three: Ephesus, Turkey - The Great Amphitheatre, July 17th 2001 ==
On July 17, 2001, John performs one of his legendary solo shows in the ancient ruins of one of Turkey's most historically famous outdoor theatres.

== Disc Four: Elton In Four Decades ==
This fourth DVD in the series features film footage from the Elton John archives, carefully selected for fans. John exclusively gives an overview of the chosen songs, and there are rare interviews with Thom Bell, Cameron Crowe, and other individuals who play major roles in the history of these songs. Highlights include a retrospective of "Your Song", which includes John performing the song from every era of his career, and the film for "I'm Still Standing", as created by David LaChappelle for The Red Piano: Live in Las Vegas shows.

== Disc One ==
1. "Funeral for a Friend/Love Lies Bleeding"
2. "Candle in the Wind"
3. "Bennie and the Jets"
4. "Goodbye Yellow Brick Road" (Elton John with Billy Joel)
5. "Someone Saved My Life Tonight"
6. "Little Jeannie"
7. "Philadelphia Freedom"
8. "Tiny Dancer"
9. "Can You Feel the Love Tonight?"
10. "Daniel"
11. "Rocket Man"
12. "Club at the End of the Street"
13. "Blue Eyes"
14. "I Guess That's Why They Call it the Blues" (Elton John with Mary J. Blige)
15. "The One"
16. "I Don't Wanna Go On with You Like That"
17. "Sorry Seems to Be the Hardest Word"
18. "Sacrifice"
19. "Come Together"
20. "Your Song" (Elton John with Ronan Keating)
21. "Sad Songs (Say So Much)" (Elton John with Bryan Adams)
22. "I'm Still Standing"
23. "Crocodile Rock"
24. "Saturday Night's Alright for Fighting" (Elton John with Anastacia)
25. "The Bitch is Back"
26. "Don't Let the Sun Go Down on Me"
27. "Don't Go Breaking My Heart" (Elton John with Kiki Dee)

== Disc Two ==
1. "Rehearsals/Interviews"
2. "Sixty Years On"
3. "Take Me to the Pilot"
4. "This Train Don't Stop There Anymore"
5. "Carla Etude"
6. "Tonight"
7. "Sorry Seems to Be the Hardest Word"
8. "Philadelphia Freedom"
9. "Burn Down the Mission"
10. "Don't Let the Sun Go Down on Me"
11. "Your Song"
12. "Saturday Night's Alright for Fighting"

== Disc Three ==
1. "Introduction"
2. "Your Song"
3. "Someone Saved My Life Tonight"
4. "Daniel"
5. "Mona Lisas and Mad Hatters"
6. "Honky Cat"
7. "Rocket Man"
8. "Philadelphia Freedom"
9. "Nikita"
10. "Sacrifice"
11. "Sorry Seems to be the Hardest Word"
12. "I Guess That's Why They Call It the Blues"
13. "This Train Don't Stop There Anymore"
14. "Burn Down the Mission"
15. "The One"
16. "Blue Eyes"
17. "I'm Still Standing"
18. "Crocodile Rock"
19. "Don't Let the Sun Go Down on Me"
20. "Circle of Life"
21. "Candle in the Wind"

== Disc Four ==
1. "Your Song" (video montage)
2. "Rocket Man" (Live in Wembley, 1984)"
3. "Mona Lisas and Mad Hatters" (Live in London, 1972)
4. "I'm Still Standing" (Live in Las Vegas, 2004)
5. "I Guess That's Why They Call It the Blues" (video montage)
6. "Empty Garden (Hey Hey Johnny)"
7. "Sacrifice"
8. "Can You Feel the Love Tonight"
9. "Believe"
10. "I Want Love"
11. "This Train Don't Stop There Anymore"
12. "Are You Ready for Love"

== Personnel ==
Guitar: Davey Johnstone, John Jorgenson, Ken Stacey
Bass: Bob Birch
Drums: Curt Bisquera, Nigel Olsson
Keyboards: Guy Babylon
Percussion: John Mahon, Nigel Olsson
Background Vocals: Billy Trudel
