= Faith Band =

American rock band

Faith Band is an American rock band from Indianapolis, Indiana. Between 1973 and 1979, the group released 5 albums that were distributed throughout the United States. The group gained popularity in their hometown in 1978 with the song "Dancin' Shoes". Later that year, Nigel Olsson recorded a version of the song which became a Top 20 hit.

Lead singer Carl Storie and bassist Mark Cawley formed the duo Blinding Tears in 1985, and released a self titled album on Riva Records in 1986. Carl Storie released a solo album in 1999; Dave Bennett released a solo album, Out of the Bleu, in 2004.

John Cascella (born on April 29, 1947) moved on to John Mellencamp's band where he played keyboards until his untimely death on November 14, 1992, at age 45. The liner notes in the album Human Wheels includes a dedication to him by Mellencamp. Johnny's keyboard expertise on an amped-up Hammond B3 organ connected to an overdriven Leslie (rotary-doppler effect) speaker box was awe-inspiring.

Dave Barnes went on to work with his brother, Terry Barnes, for Ticketmaster in the mid-1980s and helped to make it one of the largest ticket sales and distribution companies in the world.

== Members ==
- Carl Storie (lead vocals, harmonica)
- David Bennett (electric six-string guitar)
- John Cascella (keyboards, saxophone, vocals; died 1992)
- Mark Cawley (bass guitar)
- Dave Barnes (drums)

== Discography ==
- Faith (1973) Brown Bag Records/United Artists
- Excuse Me, I Just Cut an Album (1977) Village Records - VR-7703
- Rock'n Romance (1978) Village Records - VR 7805 - distributed by Phonogram
- Face to Face (1979) Village Records/Mercury SRM 1-3770
- Vital Signs (1979) Village Records/Mercury SRM 1-3807
- Faith Band Legacy (internet only release 2010)

== Singles ==
- "Dancin' Shoes" (1978) #54 Billboard Hot 100
- "You're My Weakness" (1979) #76 Billboard Hot 100

== Formerly Known As ==
- Formerly known as "The Chosen Few" Band - Included bass player and backup vocalist "Jack Hamilton" - www.garagehangover.com - Album Title: "The Chosen Few" - RCA Records LSP-4242 - 1969
- Formerly Known as The "Limousine" Band - Album Title: "Limousine" - GSF Records - GFS-S-1002 - 1972
