= Vance Buck =

Vance Matthew Buck
- Born: February 5, 1961; Richmond, Virginia
- Died: July 6, 1992 (aged 31); Varina, Virginia

Vance Matthew Buck (February 5, 1961 – July 6, 1992) was an American entrepreneur, best known for his long-term relationship with Elton John.

== Biography ==
Vance Buck was born on February 5, 1961, in Richmond, Virginia. In 1975, he moved to Manhattan, where he became immersed in the burgeoning punk rock scene. A talented entrepreneur, he soon became a luminary in New York City's underground nightlife. Buck was introduced to Elton John in 1978 by Andy Warhol, after which they became lovers and lifelong friends.

By the mid-1980s Buck became disenchanted with life on the road. In 1985, he moved to Milan, Italy, where he embarked upon a career in fashion. Shortly after moving to Milan, he lived and worked with Egon von Fürstenberg. After moving back to the United States in 1986 and testing positive for HIV, he quietly lobbied for AIDS awareness and prevention. It was Buck who brought Ryan White to the attention of Elton John.

A photo of Buck can be seen on the inside sleeve artwork for John's 1982 album Jump Up!.

Buck died of complications of AIDS on July 6, 1992. John dedicated his 1992 album The One to Buck, which can be seen in the back cover, with original artwork by Gianni Versace.
