= The One (Elton John song) =

1992 single by Elton John

Single by Elton John

from the album The One
- B-side: "Suit of Wolves"; "Fat Boys and Ugly Girls"
- Released: 25 May 1992
- Length: 5:53 (album version); 4:31 (single version)
- Label: Rocket
- Composer: Elton John
- Lyricist: Bernie Taupin
- Producer: Chris Thomas

Elton John singles chronology
"Don't Let the Sun Go Down on Me" (1991)	"The One" (1992)	"Runaway Train" (1992)

Music video
- "The One" on YouTube

"The One" is a song written by British musician Elton John and lyricist Bernie Taupin, performed by John. It is the title track and first single released in May 1992 by The Rocket Record Company from John's twenty-third album of the same name (1992). On bonus footage for the DVD release of his concert Live in Barcelona, John states that he felt an intense connection to Taupin's lyrics for the song, in light of his personal circumstances around the time of making the album, in particular the line "for each man in his time is Cain until he walks along the beach".

== Reception ==
"The One" reached No. 9 on the US Billboard Hot 100, No. 1 on the Billboard Adult Contemporary chart, and No. 10 on the UK singles chart. In Canada, it reached No. 1 on the RPM 100 chart for two weeks and the RPM Adult Contemporary chart for five weeks. In Europe, it topped the Portuguese chart and reached the top 10 in seven other countries. It was nominated for Best Male Pop Vocal Performance at the 1993 Grammy Awards.

== Music video ==
The music video for "The One" was directed by Russell Mulcahy. It features John on a reflector and a mirror while singing it and several flags (similar to the "Healing Hands" video).

== Live performances ==
John performed the song at the 1992 VMAs and the rest of his tours in the 1990s. After playing the song with the band in 2000 at Madison Square Garden during his One Night Only concerts, John permanently put it as a solo performance on his subsequent concert tours during the 2000s and 2010s.

== Accolades ==
Grammy Awards

Year	Nominee / work	Award	Result
1993	"The One"	Best Pop Vocal Performance – Male	Nominated

== Track listings ==
- CD maxi
1. "The One" (edit) – 4:31
2. "Suit of Wolves" – 5:38
3. "Fat Boys and Ugly Girls" – 4:12
- 7-inch single
1. "The One" (edit)
2. "Suit of Wolves"

== Personnel ==
- Lyrics by Bernie Taupin
- Music by Elton John
- Engineered by David Nicholas
- Artwork by Gianni Versace
- Photography by Patrick Demarchelier
- Produced by Chris Thomas

== Charts ==
=== Weekly charts ===
Chart (1992–1993)	Peak position
Australia (ARIA)	15
Austria (Ö3 Austria Top 40)	11
Belgium (Ultratop 50 Flanders)	5
Canada Top Singles (RPM)	1
Canada Adult Contemporary (RPM)	1
Denmark (IFPI)	5
Ecuador (UPI)	2
Estonia (Eesti Top 20)	4
Europe (Eurochart Hot 100)	5
Europe (European Hit Radio)	1
France (SNEP)	3
Germany (GfK)	20
Ireland (IRMA)	8
Italy (Musica e dischi)	4
Netherlands (Dutch Top 40)	11
Netherlands (Single Top 100)	14
New Zealand (Recorded Music NZ)	27
Norway (VG-lista)	3
Portugal (AFP)	1
Sweden (Sverigetopplistan)	29
Switzerland (Schweizer Hitparade)	5
UK Singles (Official Charts)	10
UK Airplay (Music Week)	3
US Billboard Hot 100	9
US Adult Contemporary (Billboard)	1
US Pop Airplay (Billboard)	6
US Cash Box Top 100	7

=== Year-end charts ===
Chart (1992)	Position
Belgium (Ultratop)	42
Brazil (Crowley)	1
Canada Top Singles (RPM)	9
Canada Adult Contemporary (RPM)	5
Europe (Eurochart Hot 100)	26
Europe (European Hit Radio)	4
Germany (Media Control)	91
Switzerland (Schweizer Hitparade)	34
UK Singles (OCC)	89
UK Airplay (Music Week)	45
US Billboard Hot 100	43
US Adult Contemporary (Billboard)	4

== Release history ==
Region	Date	Format(s)	Label(s)	Ref.
United Kingdom	25 May 1992	7-inch vinyl; CD1; cassette	Rocket	
United Kingdom	1 June 1992	CD2	Rocket	
Australia	1 June 1992	CD; cassette	Rocket	
Japan	15 June 1992	Mini-CD	Rocket	
