= David Gilmour (album) =

Studio album by David Gilmour
- Released: 26 May 1978
- Recorded: February–March 1978
- Studios: Super Bear Studios, Nice, France
- Genres: Art rock; progressive rock; blues rock
- Length: 46:19 (Original LP version); 48:13 (2006 Remastered CD version)
- Labels: Harvest; Columbia
- Producer: David Gilmour

David Gilmour chronology
| David Gilmour (1978) | About Face (1984) |

Singles from David Gilmour
- 1. "There's No Way Out of Here" Released: 4 August 1978

David Gilmour is the debut solo studio album by Pink Floyd guitarist and co-lead vocalist David Gilmour, released on 26 May 1978. The album reached number 17 in the UK and number 29 on the Billboard US album charts; it was certified Gold in the US by the RIAA. The album was produced by Gilmour, and consists mostly of blues and guitar-oriented rock songs, except for the piano-dominated ballad "So Far Away".

== Production and recording ==
The tracks used for the album were recorded between February and March 1978 with engineer John Etchells at Super Bear Studios in France. They were then mixed at the same studio by Nick Griffiths. Session musicians included bass guitarist Rick Wills and drummer Willie Wilson, both of whom used to be part of Jokers Wild with Gilmour. The album was recorded at the same studio where Pink Floyd bandmate Richard Wright had recorded his first solo album Wet Dream just weeks before, though it would not be released until September 1978.

== Album's cover artwork ==
The album cover used for the first EMI pressings of the album LP was done by Hipgnosis and Gilmour and includes Gilmour, Rick Wills and Willie Wilson in the cover photo; Gilmour was credited on the cover for contributing "Keyboards, Vocals" though he was primarily a guitarist. The CBS/Columbia pressings (outside Europe) listed Gilmour as contributing "Guitars, Keyboards, Vocals". Among those depicted on the inner sleeve is Gilmour's then-wife, Ginger.

== Single and songs ==
The album's only single was "There's No Way Out of Here." The single flopped in Europe, but became popular on album-oriented rock radio stations in the US. The song was originally recorded by the band Unicorn (as "No Way Out of Here") for their 1976 album Too Many Crooks (Harvest Records, US title Unicorn 2), which Gilmour produced. It was also recorded later by New Jersey stoner rock band Monster Magnet on their Monolithic Baby! album, and by Iron & Wine on his 2015 covers album Sing Into My Mouth.

One unused tune that was written and demoed at the time would later evolve, with lyrics by Roger Waters, into Pink Floyd's "Comfortably Numb" on The Wall. However, a song included on this album, the piano ballad "So Far Away", uses a chorus progression not unlike the chorus to "Comfortably Numb", albeit in a different key.

Likewise, the song "Short and Sweet" can be seen as a musical precursor to "Run Like Hell" (also from The Wall), with its shifting chords over a D pedal point, using a flanged guitar in Drop D tuning. "Short and Sweet" was written in collaboration with Roy Harper, who recorded a version, on which Gilmour played, for his 1980 album The Unknown Soldier.

== Promotion ==
A five-song promotional film was made to promote the album. The band comprised Gilmour on guitars and vocals, the two musicians on the album (bass player Rick Wills and drummer Willie Wilson) plus David Gilmour's brother Mark on rhythm guitar and Ian McLagan on keyboards. They performed "Mihalis", "There's No Way Out of Here", "So Far Away", "No Way", and "I Can't Breathe Anymore". There were three female backing singers on "There's No Way Out of Here" and "So Far Away": Vicki Brown, Joanne Stone and Liza Strike. The promo was recorded live at The Roxy, London.

Also, Gilmour promoted the album with his first ever interviews with North American media and FM rock radio stations. The album peaked at number 29 on the Billboard album charts, which - until 2006's On an Island - was Gilmour's highest charting solo album in the US, eventually going Gold.

== Release and reception ==
Professional ratings
Review scores
| Source | Rating |
|---|---|
| AllMusic | 2.5/5 stars |
| Classic Rock | 3.5/5 stars |
| Sputnikmusic | 3.5/5 |
| Tom Hull | B |

The album was released in the UK on 26 May 1978, and in June 1978 in the US, on Harvest and Columbia respectively.

In an interview with Circus in 1978, Gilmour said: "This album [David Gilmour] was important to me in terms of self-respect. At first I didn't think my name was big enough to carry it. Being in a group for so long can be a bit claustrophobic, and I needed to step out from behind Pink Floyd's shadow."

== Track listing ==
All music composed by David Gilmour except "There's No Way Out of Here" written by Ken Baker. All lyrics by Gilmour, except where noted.

Side one
| No. | Title | Lyrics | Length |
|---|---|---|---|
| 1. | "Mihalis" | [instrumental] | 5:46 |
| 2. | "There's No Way Out of Here" | Ken Baker | 5:08 |
| 3. | "Cry from the Street" | Gilmour, Electra Stuart | 5:13 |
| 4. | "So Far Away" | | 5:50 |
| Total length: | | | 21:57 |

Side two
| No. | Title | Lyrics | Length |
|---|---|---|---|
| 5. | "Short and Sweet" | Gilmour, Roy Harper | 5:30 |
| 6. | "Raise My Rent" | [instrumental] | 5:33 |
| 7. | "No Way" | | 5:32 |
| 8. | "Deafinitely" | [instrumental] | 4:27 |
| 9. | "I Can't Breathe Anymore" | | 3:04 |
| Total length: | | | 24:06 |

=== 2006 Remastered Edition ===
David Gilmour was re-released by EMI Records in Europe as a digitally remastered CD on 14 August 2006. Legacy Recordings/Columbia Records released the remastered CD in the US and Canada on 12 September 2006. It features slightly extended versions of some of the tracks.

| No. | Title | Lyrics | Length |
|---|---|---|---|
| 1. | "Mihalis" | [instrumental] | 5:55 |
| 2. | "There's No Way Out of Here" | Ken Baker | 5:20 |
| 3. | "Cry from the Street" | Gilmour, Electra Stuart | 5:13 |
| 4. | "So Far Away" | | 6:06 |
| 5. | "Short and Sweet" | Gilmour, Roy Harper | 5:30 |
| 6. | "Raise My Rent" | [instrumental] | 5:47 |
| 7. | "No Way" | | 6:12 |
| 8. | "Deafinitely" | [instrumental] | 4:27 |
| 9. | "I Can't Breathe Anymore" | | 3:43 |
| Total length: | | | 48:13 |

== Personnel ==
- David Gilmour – lead and backing vocals, electric and acoustic guitars, lap steel guitar, keyboards, piano on "So Far Away", harmonica on "There's No Way Out of Here", production, cover design
- Rick Wills – bass guitar, backing vocals
- Willie Wilson – drums, percussion

Additional personnel

- Mick Weaver – additional piano on "So Far Away"
- Carlena Williams – backing vocals on "There's No Way Out of Here" and "So Far Away"
- Debi Doss – backing vocals on "There's No Way Out of Here" and "So Far Away"
- Shirley Roden – backing vocals on "There's No Way Out of Here" and "So Far Away"

Production team

- Hipgnosis – cover design; photography

== Charts ==
| Chart | Peak Position |
|---|---|
| Canada Top Albums/CDs (RPM) | 28 |
| New Zealand Albums Chart | 22 |
| Swedish Albums Chart | 20 |
| UK Albums Chart | 17 |
| US Billboard Top LPs & Tape | 29 |
