= Swallow Tales (Cochise album) =

Studio album by Cochise
- Released: 1971
- Recorded: 1971
- Genre: Country rock
- Length: 39:52
- Label: Liberty
- Producer: Cochise, Dick Taylor

Cochise chronology
Cochise (1970)	Swallow Tales (1971)	So Far (1972)

Swallow Tales is a 1971 album by British country rock band Cochise.

Cochise was most well known for guitarist Mick Grabham, who joined British rock band Procol Harum after Cochise dissolved in 1972. The album was released in 1971, and featured several supporting artists including Tim Renwick and Cat Batchelor. The album was released by music label Liberty Records.

The album was originally released as an LP, and was later released on CD. The album was produced by Dick Taylor in conjunction with the band.

== Background ==
The band were formed in 1969 and released their first album, Cochise, in 1970. The makeup of the band changed greatly before the recording of Swallow Tales as lead singer Stewart Brown was replaced by John Gilbert. Guitarist BJ Cole said that Gilbert's voice contrasted with the voice of Brown, as Gilbert sounded best on rock songs whereas Brown was more mellow. Critic Richie Unterberger (of Allmusic), however, felt that the music sounded largely the same as on their previous self-titled album, and described them as "middle of the pack" with neither "stylistic distinction" or "top-shelf songwriting".

The songwriting was done entirely by guitarists Mick Grabham and Cole, with the exception of "Love's Made a Fool of You" which is by Buddy Holly and Bob Montgomery.

== Track listing ==
1. "Love's Made a Fool of You" - (Buddy Holly, Bob Montgomery) - 2:51
2. "Jed Collder" - (Mick Grabham) - 3:18
3. "Down Country Girls" - (Mick Grabham) - 1:49
4. "Home Again" - (Mick Grabham) - 3:41
5. "Lost Hearts" - (BJ Cole) - 3:25
6. "Strange Images" - (BJ Cole) - 2:03
7. "Why I Sing the Blues" - (Mick Grabham) - 4:09
8. "Another Day" - (Mick Grabham) - 5:16
9. "Axiom of Maria" - (BJ Cole) - 7:02
10. "Can I Break Your Heart" - (Mick Grabham) - 5:03
11. "O Come All Ye Faithful" - (Traditional; arranged by BJ Cole) - 1:15

== Personnel ==
Cochise

- John Gilbert - lead vocals
- BJ Cole - resonator and pedal steel guitars, design concept
- Mick Grabham - electric and acoustic guitars, backing vocals
- Rick Wills - bass, backing vocals, percussion
- Willie Wilson - drums, backing vocals, percussion

Additional musicians

- Caleb Quaye - piano (3, 5, 9), electric guitar (7)
- Nigel Olsson - harmony vocals (5)
- Steve Marriott - piano (6), backing vocals (6)
- Tim Renwick - electric guitar (7)

Additional personnel

- Roger Wake - engineer
- Hugh Fielder - liner notes
- Paul David Hickson - cover art, design conception
- W. Heath Robinson - front cover painting
