= Nigel Olsson =

English drummer (born 1949)

- Olsson in 2023

Background information
- Also known as: Ollie Olsson
- Born: 10 February 1949 (age 77); Wallasey, Cheshire, England
- Genre: Rock
- Occupation: Drummer
- Years active: 1967–present
- Member of: Elton John Band
- Formerly of: Argosy; Plastic Penny; Uriah Heep; Spencer Davis Group
- Website: www.facebook.com/NigelOlssonFanClub

Nigel Olsson (born 10 February 1949) is an English drummer, best known for being a lifelong member of the Elton John Band. He has had an equally long career as a session musician and composed, recorded and produced albums as a solo artist, highlighting his 1979 hit single "Dancin' Shoes".

== Career ==
=== Early years ===
Olsson was born to John and Elsa Olsson in Wallasey, Cheshire, England, the second of five boys. His family were originally from Gothenburg and he spent his early life living in Sunderland, where he worked on the pilot boats on the River Wear. He began his musical career playing the guitar in small bands, including the Sunderland based Fireflies; and took up the drums at a gig where the drummer did not show up at the last minute. His first appearance on a record album was in the band Plastic Penny, which released Two Sides of a Penny on Page One Records in 1968. Olsson was spotlighted on one song on that album, "I Want You," performing both lead vocals and a drum solo.

In 1969 he played drums on the "flower power" pop single "Mr. Boyd" b/w "Imagine" by Argosy, a one-off group which also included Reginald Dwight (later known as Elton John), Caleb Quaye, and Roger Hodgson. Olsson also had a brief stint with the English hard rock band Uriah Heep, playing drums on two songs on their 1970 debut LP, Very 'eavy... Very 'umble.

Subsequently, he played drums on one track on Elton John's debut album, Empty Sky, and then replaced Dave Hynes in The Spencer Davis Group, joining forces with bassist Dee Murray. The pair joined John on the road as his touring band in April 1970, and played with John during his debut tour in the United States at the Troubadour Club on 25 August 1970. Only permitted at first to play on one track of each of John's early studio albums, Olsson and Murray, along with guitarist Davey Johnstone, became Elton's studio band with the recording of Honky Chateau in January 1972.

=== Joining the Elton John band ===
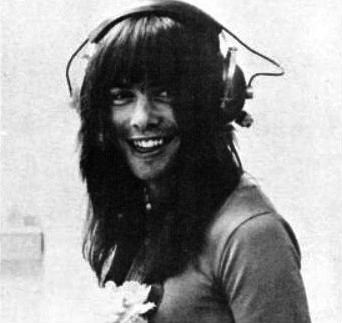
Olsson in 1971

With Johnstone, Olsson, and Murray on board, John enjoyed a string of critically acclaimed albums and hit singles. The albums include Honky Chateau, Don't Shoot Me I'm Only the Piano Player, Goodbye Yellow Brick Road, and Caribou. Shortly before the Caribou studio sessions, famed session percussionist Ray Cooper joined permanently, having previously been a sideman, what was billed as The Elton John Band. Olsson played during all of John's tours, and confesses that he still gets nervous before going on stage.

In 1971, Olsson produced and released his debut solo album Nigel Olsson's Drum Orchestra and Chorus on Uni Records, featuring Murray, Cochise (band) guitarist Mick Grabham, and Hookfoot guitarist Caleb Quaye, who had played on John's early albums. Olsson also teamed up with the Liverpool trio, The Big Three, for their reunion album Resurrection (1973).

In May 1975, Olsson and Murray were dismissed from John's band following the release of Captain Fantastic and the Brown Dirt Cowboy, which, upon release, entered the charts at No. 1. Olsson's second solo album, Nigel Olsson, appeared later that year on John's own record label, The Rocket Record Company, and featured a cover of the Bee Gees'-penned "Only One Woman", which had been recorded with John and his band in August 1974 during the sessions for Captain Fantastic and the Brown Dirt Cowboy, and was produced by Gus Dudgeon. The album was produced by Robert Appére.

Olsson continued working as a studio musician, releasing another self-titled album produced by Paul Davis on Columbia in 1978, while managed by Martin Pichinson. Although that album brought no Top 40 recognition, in 1979 he released the album Nigel and enjoyed some mild success as a solo artist, scoring a pair of Top 40 hits on the U.S. pop chart with "A Little Bit of Soap" and "Dancin' Shoes", the latter of which cracked the Top 20 at No. 18. "Dancin' Shoes" was written by Carl Storie, and first recorded by his Faith Band.

In August 1980, he released the album Changing Tides on CBS's Bang Records, but the album failed to achieve chart success. That same year, Olsson returned to Elton John's band for what was to be a four-year tenure, appearing on John's albums 21 at 33 and The Fox. He rejoined former bandmates Murray and Johnstone for the tour behind John's 1982 album Jump Up!, and stayed with the reformed band through the next two albums and tours for Too Low for Zero (1983) and Breaking Hearts (1984). Following another line-up change, they would rejoin only one more time in 1988 for backing vocals on Reg Strikes Back prior to Murray's untimely death on 15 January 1992.

In 1991, Olsson reunited with Johnstone in the band Warpipes, releasing Holes in the Heavens. Although the album was critically successful, it failed commercially as a result of their label, Artful Balance, going bankrupt. The band was unable to tour to support the record.

On 31 March 2000, Olsson sang backing vocals alongside Billy Trudel and Ken Stacey when John appeared on The Today Show to promote the soundtrack to the film The Road to El Dorado. On 3 April, Olsson played drums on three songs at the Broadway Cares/Equity Fights AIDS benefit saluting John at the New Amsterdam Theatre in New York City. By the time of John's "One Night Only" concerts in New York City on 20 and 21 October, Olsson was alternating with and playing drums alongside Curt Bisquera. In January 2001, Olsson took over the full-time drumming chores when Bisquera left to pursue other projects.

In 2001 Olsson released another solo album titled Move The Universe on 81 Records. Davey Johnstone and Guy Babylon produced the record and played on all of the tracks, along with Bob Birch on bass, Elton John alumnus Fred Mandel on piano, John Mahon on percussion, and Billy Trudel on backing vocals. Kiki Dee sang lead vocals on Roachford's "Naked Without You", and Olsson's brother Kai sang lead vocals on McGuinness Flint's "When I'm Dead an' Gone." The track "Building A Bird" had been written by Elton John & Bernie Taupin in 1994 during the sessions for Elton's album "Made in England," but never recorded. Olsson dedicated the album to the late Dee Murray.

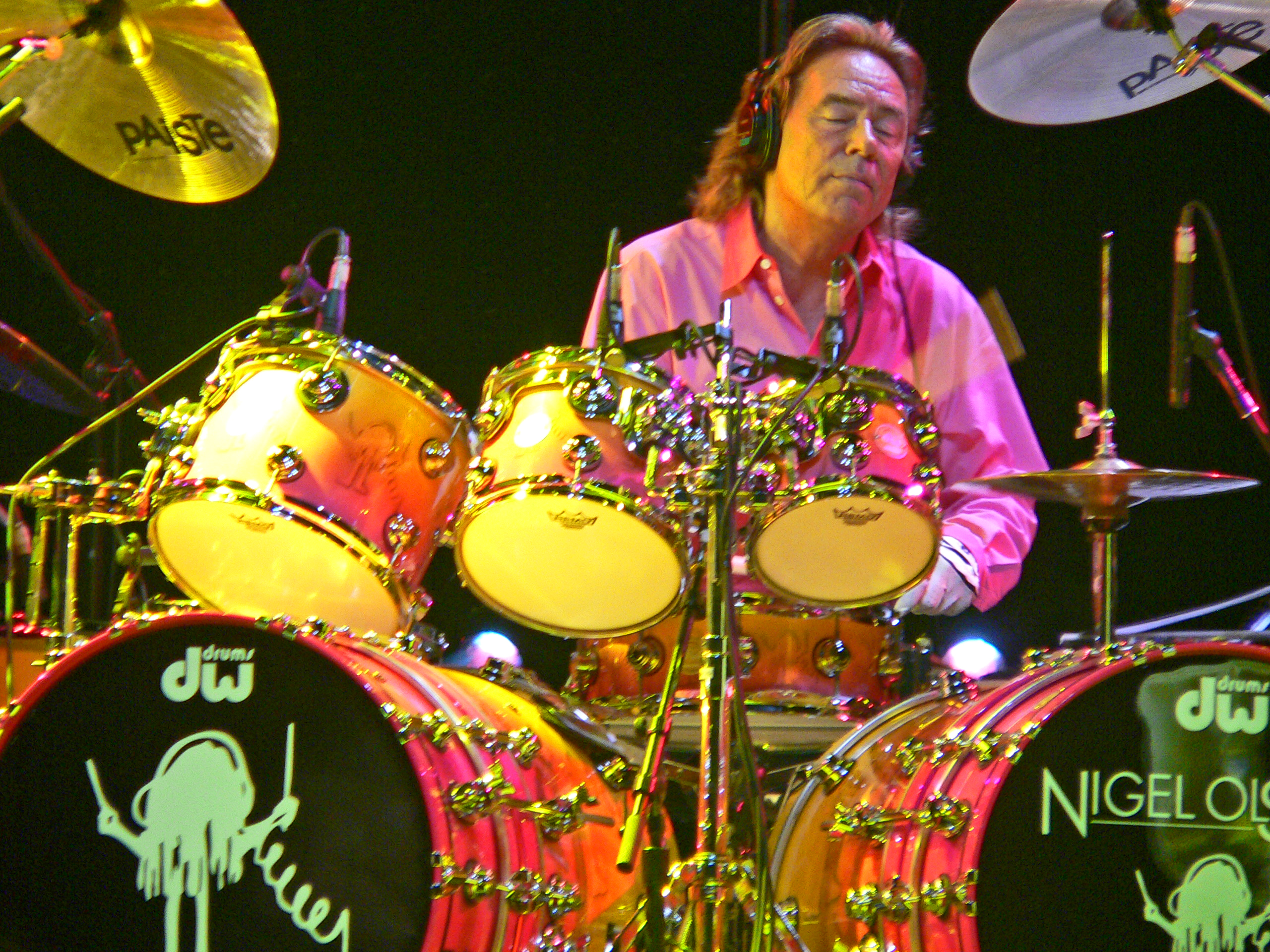
Olsson performing in 2007

In the studio, he played and sang backing vocals on several tracks on John's Songs from the West Coast (2001). He then played all the drums on Peachtree Road (2004) and The Captain & the Kid (2006), as well as continuing in the touring band, along with Johnstone, Bob Birch (bass), Kim Bullard (keyboards) and John Mahon (percussion). With bassist Matt Bissonette replacing the late Bob Birch in 2012, this band recorded Wonderful Crazy Night in 2015 for release in February 2016.

On 9 November 2014, Olsson played his 2000th concert with Elton John at the Ice Hall Palace in Saint Petersburg, Russia.

On his 68th birthday, 10 February 2017, Olsson played his 2,267th concert with Elton John at The Colosseum at Caesars Palace, Las Vegas, Nevada.

On 25 June 2023, Olsson played with headliner Elton John at the Glastonbury Festival.

== Personal life ==
Olsson has one son, Justin, from his marriage to Lisa Gombatz (twin sister of Dee Murray’s wife Maria), and one daughter, Annette, who lives with her husband Barry in England with their two children. In 1989, Olsson married Schanda Butler, daughter of music producer Larry Butler. They live in Los Angeles.

Olsson is a longtime car and racing fanatic, and has been associated with the Vintage Auto Racing Association and the Historic Motor Sports Association in the United States as both a race car driver and a pace car driver.

== Discography ==
=== Solo albums ===
Year	Album	Billboard 200	Record label
1971	Nigel Olsson's Drum Orchestra and Chorus	—	DJM Records
1975	Nigel Olsson	—	The Rocket Record Company
1975	Drummers Can Sing Too!	—	The Rocket Record Company
1978	Nigel Olsson (second self-titled)	—	Columbia Records
1979	Nigel	140	Bang Records
1980	Changing Tides	—	Bang Records
2001	Move The Universe	—	81 Records

=== Singles ===
Year	Title	Peak chart positions			Record Label	B-side	Album
Year	Title	US Pop	US AC	AUS	Record Label	B-side	Album
1971	"Some Sweet Day"	—	—	—	Uni Records	"Weirdhouse"	Nigel Olsson's Drum Orchestra and Chorus
1971	"Sunshine Looks Like Rain"	—	—	—	Uni Records	"And I Know in My Heart"	Nigel Olsson's Drum Orchestra and Chorus
1972	"Alabama"	—	—	—	DJM Records	"Sunshine Looks Like Rain"	
1974	"Something Lacking in Me"	—	—	—	The Rocket Record Company	"Songs I Sing"	Nigel Olsson
1974	"Only One Woman"	91	—	58	The Rocket Record Company	"In Good Time"	Nigel Olsson
1976	"Get It up for Love"	—	—	—	The Rocket Record Company	"Can't You See"	Nigel Olsson
1976	"Girl We've Got to Keep On"	—	—	—	The Rocket Record Company	"A Girl Like You" (US No. 107)	Nigel Olsson
1978	"Say Goodbye to Hollywood"	—	—	—	CBS Records International	"Living in a Fantasy"	Nigel
1978	"Dancin' Shoes"	18	8	62	Bang Records	"Living in a Fantasy"	Nigel
1979	"Little Bit of Soap"	34	9	54	Bang Records	"Thinking of You"	Nigel
1979	"Part of the Chosen Few"	—	—	—	Bang Records	"All It Takes"	Nigel
1980	"Saturday Night"	—	—	—	Bang Records	"Trapeze"	Changing Tides

== With Elton John ==
Empty Sky, 1969
Elton John With Dee Murray And Nigel Olsson 11-17-70, 1970
The Early Years, 1970
Tumbleweed Connection, 1970
Very Alive, 1971
Friends, 1971
Madman Across the Water, 1971
Tokyo Shakes: Live in Japan 1971, 1971
First Visit 1971, (Italy) 1971
Honky Château, 1972
Don't Shoot Me I'm Only the Piano Player, 1973
Goodbye Yellow Brick Road, 1973
Live, (Hollywood Bowl) 1973
Caribou, 1974
Live at Hammersmith, 1974
Apple Pie, 1974
Captain Fantastic and the Brown Dirt Cowboy, 1975
Stand At The Seattle Center Coliseum, 1975
Here and There, 1976
Elton John Band Featuring John Lennon and The Muscle Shoals Horns, 1976
Concierto Grabado En Vivo!, 1976
21 at 33, 1980
The Fox, 1981
In Central Park, 1981
Too Low for Zero, 1983
Breaking Hearts, 1984
Reg Strikes Back, 1988 (vocals)
The Night Time Concert, 1990
To Be Continued…, 1990
The One, 1992 (vocals)
Madman Shakes Tokyo!, 1998
The Road to El Dorado soundtrack, 2000 (vocals)
Elton John One Night Only – The Greatest Hits, 2000
Songs from the West Coast, 2001
Peachtree Road, 2004
Dream Ticket, 2004
The Captain & the Kid, 2006
Live At Rose Hall, 2006
Live At Watford Football Club, 2006
Elton 60 – Live at Madison Square Garden, 2007
The Red Piano, 2008
Elton John In Japan, 2008
Live 2009 - Gloucestershire County Cricket Club, 2009
Wonderful Crazy Night, 2016

== With other artists ==
- Plastic Penny - Two Sides of a Penny, 1968
- Chris Britton - As I Am, 1969
- Plastic Penny - Currency, 1969
- The Spencer Davis Group - Funky, 1970
- Uriah Heep - ...Very 'Eavy ...Very 'Umble, 1970
- Cochise - Swallow Tales, 1971 (vocals)
- Ray Fenwick - Keep America Beautiful, Get A Haircut, 1971
- Musicians Union Band - Musicians Union Band, 1971
- Long John Baldry - Everything Stops for Tea, 1972
- David Elliott - David Elliott, 1972
- Mick Grabham - Mick the Lad, 1972
- The Big Three - Resurrection 1973
- Kiki Dee - Loving & Free 1973
- Davey Johnstone - Smiling Face 1973
- Jimmy Webb - Land's End, 1974
- Randy Edelman - Farewell Fairbanks, 1975
- Kai Olsson – Once In A While 1975
- Michel Polnareff - Michel Polnareff 1975
- Linda Ronstadt - Prisoner in Disguise 1975
- Neil Sedaka - Overnight Success aka The Hungry Years, 1975
- Rod Stewart - Atlantic Crossing, 1975
- The Who - Tommy, 1975
- Barbi Benton - Something New, 1976
- Brian Cadd - White on White, 1976
- Michael Dinner - Tom Thumb The Dreamer, 1976
- Peter Lemongello - Do I Love You, 1976
- Brian And Brenda Russell - Word Called Love, 1976
- Leon Russell and Mary Russell - Wedding Album, 1976
- Leo Sayer - Endless Flight, 1976
- Neil Sedaka - Steppin' Out, 1976
- Rick Springfield - Wait for Night, 1976
- Eric Carmen - Boats Against the Current, 1977
- Paul Davis - Singer of Songs: Teller of Tales, 1977
- Lisa Dalbello - Lisa Dal Ballo, 1977
- Randy Edelman - If Love Is Real, 1977 (vocals)
- The Keane Brothers - The Keane Brothers, 1977
- Helen Reddy - Ear Candy, 1977 (vocals)
- Jimmy Webb - El Mirage, 1977
- Eric Carmen - Change of Heart, 1978
- Bonnie Pointer - Bonnie Pointer, 1978
- Bob Weir - Heaven Help The Fool, 1978
- Paul Davis - Paul Davis, 1980 (vocals)
- Neil Sedaka - In the Pocket, 1980
- Gowan - Great Dirty World, 1987
- Mickey Gilley - Chasing Rainbows, 1988 (vocals)
- David Foster: River Of Love, 1990
- Warpipes: Holes In The Heavens, 1991
- Kenny Rogers - If Only My Heart Had a Voice, 1993
- Uriah Heep - The Lansdowne Tapes, 1993
- Warpipes: War Pipes, 1995
- Roch Voisine - Kissing Rain, 1996
- Guitar Orchestra - Guitar Orchestra, 1997
- Dan Mcavinchey - Guitar Haus, 1997
- Toto - Through the Looking Glass, 2002 (vocals)
- David Sneddon - Seven Years – Ten Weeks, 2003
- B. B. King - B. B. King & Friends: 80, 2005
- The Davey Johnstone Band - Deeper Than My Roots, 2022
