= Cochise (album) =

1970 studio album by Cochise

Studio album by Cochise
- Released: 1970
- Studio: Kingsway and De Lane Lea Studios, London
- Label: United Artists
- Producer: Dick Taylor

Cochise chronology
| Cochise (1970) | Swallow Tales (1971) |

Cochise is the debut album from the British rock band Cochise.

== Cover art ==
The cover art, a nude female breast, was designed by Hipgnosis.

== Reception ==
Professional ratings
Review scores
| Source | Rating |
|---|---|
| Allmusic | 3.5/5 stars |

Richie Unterberger of Allmusic wrote that Cochise "treads an uneasy line between eclectic diversity and a lack of direction" and is "distinguished just slightly by a more country-ish flavor than the norm [early 1970s British rock], courtesy of Cole's pedal steel". He goes on to call the sound "a wistful rural feel to parts of the material that suggests some promise" but refers to "Painted Lady" and "Moment and the End" as "tense, meandering hard rock tunes" and the cover version of Simon & Garfunkel's "59th Street Bridge Song" "an unnecessary, pedestrian heavy rock cover".

== Track listing ==
1. "Velvet Mountain" (Mick Grabham) – 3:26
2. "China" (Grabham) – 3:55
3. "Trafalgar Day" (B. J. Cole) – 5:08
4. "Moment and the End" (Cole) – 5:58
5. "Watch This Space" (Stewart Brown) – 3:56
6. "59th Street Bridge Song (Feelin' Groovy)" (Paul Simon) – 3:39
7. "Past Loves" (Brown) – 3:38
8. "Painted Lady" (Grabham) – 7:03
9. "Black Is the Colour" (Traditional) 0:56 (this track is not on the UK version)

== Personnel ==
Cochise

- Stewart Brown – lead vocals, acoustic guitar
- B.J. Cole – pedal steel guitar, dobro, cello
- Mick Grabham – lead and acoustic guitars, piano, organ, backing vocals
- Rick Wills – bass, backing vocals
- John "Sly" Wilson – drums, percussion, backing vocals

Technical

- Hipgnosis – photography, cover design
- John Stewart – engineer
- Hugh Fielder – liner notes

== Release history ==
| Date | Label | Format | Catalog |
|---|---|---|---|
| 1970 | United Artists | LP | UAS29117 |
| 29 July 2002 | Spiral Music Productions | CD | SCD933 |
