= The Last Song (Elton John song) =

1992 single by Elton John

- UK 7-inch cover

Single by Elton John

from the album The One
- B-side: "The Man Who Never Died" (remix)
- Released: October 1992
- Length: 3:21
- Label: Rocket; MCA
- Songwriters: Elton John; Bernie Taupin
- Producer: Chris Thomas

Elton John singles chronology
"Runaway Train" (1992)	"The Last Song" (1992)	"Simple Life" (1993)

Music video
- "The Last Song" on YouTube

"The Last Song" is a song by British musician Elton John and lyricist Bernie Taupin, released in October 1992 by Rocket and MCA Records as the third single from John's twenty-third studio album, The One (1992). The song marked the first of John's American singles to benefit his AIDS foundation. It reached No. 7 in Canada and No. 21 in the United Kingdom while peaking within the top 40 in several countries worldwide, including Australia, Ireland, New Zealand, and the United States.

== Background ==
The song tells the story of a boy dying of AIDS who is rejected by his father because of his homosexuality. The dying son meets his father and confesses his illness to him.

John's lyricist, Bernie Taupin, faxed the lyrics to him in Paris, shortly after Queen lead singer Freddie Mercury had died the previous year. He said: "I was crying all the time as I wrote the music", John told The Advocate, "and it was very hard for me to sing it". Taupin went on to explain:

"We didn't go for the obvious. I tried to do something lyrically that would thaw the intolerance of not understanding. That's why I used the idea of a father coming to terms with his son's status in life and his sexuality, but unfortunately understanding too late. If you can melt a little intolerance along the way, I'm happy with that."

Originally titled "Song for 1992", it was renamed for its position on the album to avoid dating it.

== Music video ==
A music video, directed by American director Gus Van Sant, was made for the song, but he was not the first director considered; David Hockney and Madonna had previously declined the offer. It features a father reconciling with his son, who is dying from AIDS, interspersed with footage of John performing the song.

== Personnel ==
- Elton John – piano, vocals
- Guy Babylon – keyboards

== Charts ==
=== Weekly charts ===
Chart (1992–1993)	Peak position
Australia (ARIA)	32
Belgium (Ultratop 50 Flanders)	35
Canada Top Singles (RPM)	7
Canada Adult Contemporary (RPM)	3
Europe (Eurochart Hot 100)	80
Germany (GfK)	72
Ireland (IRMA)	28
Netherlands (Dutch Top 40)	36
Netherlands (Single Top 100)	38
New Zealand (Recorded Music NZ)	27
UK Singles (Official Charts)	21
UK Airplay (Music Week)	32
US Billboard Hot 100	23
US Adult Contemporary (Billboard)	2
US Pop Airplay (Billboard)	26
US Cash Box Top 100	20

=== Year-end charts ===
Chart (1992)	Position
Canada Adult Contemporary (RPM)	53

Chart (1993)	Position
Canada Top Singles (RPM)	77
Canada Adult Contemporary (RPM)	47
US Adult Contemporary (Billboard)	29

== Release history ==
Region	Date	Format(s)	Label(s)	Ref.
United States	October 1992	Cassette	MCA	
United Kingdom	26 October 1992	7-inch vinyl; CD; cassette	Rocket	
Japan	21 December 1992	CD	Rocket	

== In popular culture ==
"The Last Song" was used during a closing montage at the end of the 1993 film And the Band Played On, which featured images of notable people who had contracted AIDS. It has also been mentioned numerous times on The Howard Stern Show; whose producer Gary Dell'Abate said that the song and music video reminded him of his brother, who died of AIDS around the time The One was released. When they first played the song on the air, Dell'Abate broke out in tears during the first verse.

== See also ==
- "Gone Too Soon", a song by Michael Jackson, dedicated to Ryan White.
