= Willie Wilson (drummer) =

English drummer (born 1947)

- Born: John Cecil Wilson; 8 July 1947 (age 79); Cambridge, England
- Instruments: Drums, percussion, bass
- Formerly of: Pink Floyd; Quiver

John Cecil "Willie" Wilson (born 8 July 1947) is an English rock drummer, known for his work with Pink Floyd and his long-time association with their guitarist, David Gilmour.

== Music career ==
In April 1966, Wilson joined Jokers Wild, a Cambridge band that included his friend David Gilmour on guitar, and later, Rick Wills (subsequently of Foreigner and Bad Company) on bass.

In mid-1967, the band travelled to France. The trio performed under the band name Flowers, then Bullitt, but were not successful. After hearing their uninspired covers of contemporary chart hits, club owners were reluctant to pay them, and soon after their arrival in Paris, thieves stole their equipment. When Bullitt returned to England later that year, they were so impoverished that their van was completely empty of petrol and they had to push it off the ferry.

Gilmour subsequently replaced Syd Barrett in Pink Floyd. When Barrett was making his first solo album, The Madcap Laughs, released in January 1970, he enlisted Wilson, who played bass on two of the album's tracks, "No Man's Land" and "Here I Go". Wilson also provided percussion on the follow-up, Barrett, released in November the same year.

In the early 1970s, Wilson and Wills joined country rock band Cochise, with whom his recorded work was credited as "John 'Sly' Wilson".

In 1972 and 1973, Wilson recorded with Al Stewart, drumming on the albums Orange and Past, Present and Future, respectively. He is credited as "John Wilson" on both albums.

After leaving Cochise, Wilson joined the band Quiver, formed by Tim Renwick, who had played on the second Cochise album (and who would later tour with Pink Floyd). Quiver's first album featured Dick Parry on saxophone. They soon formed a collaboration with the Sutherland Brothers, to record and tour as "Sutherland Brothers & Quiver". Their 1975 single, "Ain't Too Proud" featured Gilmour on pedal steel guitar Wilson was the last member of Quiver to depart the partnership, in 1979.

In 1978, during a hiatus in Pink Floyd's work, Gilmour reunited with Wilson and Wills to record his eponymous first solo album David Gilmour. There was no tour to accompany the album, but a film exists of the trio performing live, augmented by other musicians

For their 1980–1981 concerts in support of their concept album The Wall, Pink Floyd were joined by a "surrogate band" - each member being shadowed by a second person. The second drummer (initially appearing on stage wearing a mask to make him look like Pink Floyd drummer Nick Mason) was Wilson, and his contributions can be heard on the live album Is There Anybody Out There? The Wall Live 1980–81, eventually released in 2000. Another Quiver member, Peter Wood, was the surrogate keyboard player.

Wilson also plays drums on Gilmour's single "Smile", from his 2006 album On an Island.

Wilson lives in Cornwall and gigs regularly around the county with three-piece band, The Hoodle, who also often have Renwick as a second guitarist.
