= Cochise (band) =

English country rock band

- Genres: Country rock
- Labels: United Artists Records, Liberty Records, Edsel Records

Cochise was an English country rock band that performed in the early 1970s. Their albums and singles were released on the United Artists and Liberty Records labels.

== Background ==
This band is more significant for who they included than what they produced. Singer Stewart Brown had grown up with Reggie Dwight, later Elton John, and co-founded the band Bluesology with him. After the demise of Cochise, Mick Grabham made a solo album in 1972 and joined Procol Harum the following year. B.J. Cole also recorded a solo album in 1972, called The New Hovering Dog, before becoming an important session musician playing with Elton John, Uriah Heep and many others throughout the 1970s. Rick Wills and John "Willie" Wilson played on David Gilmour's debut solo album in 1978.

John Gilbert would go on to join the group Pluto for about six months. He sang on one of their singles.

== Personnel ==
- Stewart A. Brown - lead vocals, guitar – born 28 January 1942, Pinner, Middlesex
- B.J. Cole - pedal steel guitar, Dobro, occasional cello – born Brian John Cole, 17 June 1946, Enfield, Middlesex
- Mick Grabham - guitar, backing and occasional lead vocals, organ, piano – born 22 January 1948, Sunderland
- Rick Wills - bass, backing vocals, percussion – born Richard William Wills, 5 December 1947, Cambridge
- John 'Willie' Wilson - drums, backing vocals, percussion – born John Cecil Wilson, 8 July 1947, Cambridge
- John Gilbert - lead vocals – born John Weston, 13 September 1948, Warrington, Lancashire
- Roy O'Temro - drums, percussion – died 1972

== Discography ==
=== Albums ===
- Cochise (United Artists Uas 29177) 1970 (reissued on CD by Kissing Spell, 2002 - SCD933)
- Swallow Tales (Liberty Lbg 83428) 1971 (reissued on CD by Kissing Spell, 2002 - SCD934)
- So Far (United Artists Uas 29286) 1972 (reissued on CD by Kissing Spell, 2002 - SCD935)
- Velvet Mountain - An Anthology 1970-1972 (Esoteric Recordings ECLEC 22388) 2013 (2 CD reissue of all three Cochise albums plus the non-LP B side, "Words of a Dying Man")

=== Singles ===
- "Watch This Space" / "59th Street Bridge Song" (United Artists UP 35134) 1970
- "Love's Made A Fool of You" / "Words of a Dying Man" (Liberty LBF 15425) 1970
- "Why I Sing The Blues" / "Jed Collder" (Liberty LBF 15460) 1971

=== Compilation albums ===
- The track "Home Again" appears on United Artists Records 1971 sampler All Good Clean Fun (UDX 201/2)
- "Home Again" and "Velvet Mountain" appear on the 2004 EMI CD re-package of All Good Clean Fun (Liberty 8660902)

== Bibliography ==
- The Tapestry of Delights - The Comprehensive Guide to British Music of the Beat, R&B, Psychedelic and Progressive Eras 1963-1976, Vernon Joynson ISBN 1-899855-04-1
