= Too Low for Zero Tour =

1984 concert tour by Elton John

- Tour by Elton John
- Australia tour program
- Location: Asia; Oceania
- Associated album: Too Low for Zero
- Start date: 19 February 1984
- End date: 31 March 1984
- Legs: 2
- No. of shows: 24

Elton John concert chronology
- Jump Up Tour (1982–83); Too Low for Zero Tour (1984); European Express Tour (1984)

The Too Low for Zero Tour was a concert tour by English musician and composer Elton John, in support of his 17th studio album Too Low for Zero. The tour consisted in 24 shows across Australia, New Zealand and Hong Kong.

== Background ==
The tour was scheduled to promote the Too Low for Zero album, released on 30 May 1983. This tour featured the addition of keyboardist and guitarist Fred Mandel (who had recently worked with Davey Johnstone in Alice Cooper's band) to the traditional line-up of Davey, Dee and Nigel. The tour began at the Addington Showgrounds in Christchurch and covered 22 shows in New Zealand and Australia, ending up with 2 shows in Hong Kong, at the Hong Kong Coliseum. Ticket sales were phenomenal - most of the concerts were sold out, breaking all previous records.

== Setlist ==
1. "Tiny Dancer"
2. "Hercules"
3. "Rocket Man"
4. "Daniel"
5. "Teacher I Need You"
6. "Candle in the Wind"
7. "The Bitch Is Back"
8. "Don't Let the Sun Go Down on Me"
9. "Island Girl"
10. "Bennie and the Jets"
11. "Sorry Seems to Be the Hardest Word"
12. "Philadelphia Freedom"
13. "Blue Eyes" / "I Guess That's Why They Call It the Blues"
14. "Crystal"
15. "Kiss the Bride"
16. "One More Arrow"
17. "Too Low for Zero"
18. "I'm Still Standing"
19. "Your Song"
20. "Saturday Night's Alright for Fighting"
21. "Goodbye Yellow Brick Road"
22. "Crocodile Rock"
23. "Pinball Wizard"
24. "Song for Guy"

== Tour dates ==
Date	City	Country	Venue
Oceania
19 February 1984	Christchurch	New Zealand	Addington Showgrounds
22 February 1984	Wellington	New Zealand	Wellington Athletic Park
25 February 1984	Auckland	New Zealand	Mount Smart Stadium
28 February 1984	Melbourne	Australia	Melbourne Sports and Entertainment Centre
29 February 1984	Melbourne	Australia	Melbourne Sports and Entertainment Centre
1 March 1984	Melbourne	Australia	Melbourne Sports and Entertainment Centre
2 March 1984	Melbourne	Australia	Melbourne Sports and Entertainment Centre
3 March 1984	Melbourne	Australia	Melbourne Sports and Entertainment Centre
6 March 1984	Perth	Australia	Perth Entertainment Centre
7 March 1984	Perth	Australia	Perth Entertainment Centre
9 March 1984	Adelaide	Australia	Memorial Drive Park
12 March 1984	Brisbane	Australia	Brisbane Festival Hall
13 March 1984	Brisbane	Australia	Brisbane Festival Hall
14 March 1984	Brisbane	Australia	Brisbane Festival Hall
16 March 1984	Sydney	Australia	Sydney Entertainment Centre
17 March 1984	Sydney	Australia	Sydney Entertainment Centre
19 March 1984	Sydney	Australia	Sydney Entertainment Centre
20 March 1984	Sydney	Australia	Sydney Entertainment Centre
21 March 1984	Sydney	Australia	Sydney Entertainment Centre
22 March 1984	Sydney	Australia	Sydney Entertainment Centre
24 March 1984	Sydney	Australia	Sydney Entertainment Centre
25 March 1984	Sydney	Australia	Sydney Entertainment Centre
Asia
30 March 1984	Hong Kong	British Hong Kong	Hong Kong Coliseum
31 March 1984	Hong Kong	British Hong Kong	Hong Kong Coliseum

== Personnel ==
- Elton John: Piano, Lead Vocals
- Davey Johnstone: Guitars, Backing Vocals
- Dee Murray: Bass guitar, Backing Vocals
- Nigel Olsson: Drums, Percussion, Backing Vocals
- Fred Mandel: Keyboards, Guitar, Backing Vocals
