= Jump Up Tour =

1982–83 concert tour by Elton John

- Tour by Elton John
- Poster to the concerts in Belgium
- Location: Asia; Europe; North America; Oceania
- Associated album: Jump Up!
- Start date: 10 March 1982
- End date: 15 October 1983
- Legs: 5
- No. of shows: 15 in Oceania; 70 in Europe; 42 in North America; 8 in Africa; 135 in total

Elton John concert chronology
- 1980 World Tour (1980); Jump Up Tour (1982–83); Too Low for Zero Tour (1984)

The Jump Up! Tour was a worldwide concert tour by English musician and composer Elton John, in support of his 16th studio album Jump Up!. The tour included five legs (Australia, Europe, North America, UK and South Africa) and a total of 135 shows.

== Tour ==
On 10 March 1982, the Athletic Park in Wellington was the site of Davey Johnstone's return to the Elton John band, reuniting the classic band on stage for the first time in eight years.

Elton John, Davey Johnstone, Dee Murray and Nigel Olsson then took the Jump Up! Tour across Australia and Europe (and blasting through New York on 17 April with a powerful performance of "Empty Garden" and "Ball And Chain" on Saturday Night Live) before launching their North American tour on 12 June at the Red Rocks Amphitheatre in Colorado. The 7 July show in Kansas City, Missouri, was broadcast live on nationwide radio, and this leg of the tour ended after three nights at Madison Square Garden on 7 August 1982. Two nights before, Yoko Ono and Sean Lennon had come out on stage to embrace John after he played his tribute to the late John Lennon, Empty Garden, for the first time in New York City since the musician's death.

After an opening set by Geffen label-mates Quarterflash, John and the band typically played a 23-song set, with such seldom-played tunes as "Where Have All The Good Times Gone?", "Ball And Chain" and "Teacher I Need You", before encoring with a "Whole Lotta Shakin’ Going On"/"I Saw Her Standing There"/"Twist and Shout" medley.

Following a three-month break, during which the band recorded the album Too Low for Zero in Montserrat, the tour resumed in Newcastle upon Tyne, England, on 2 November 1982.

The next 43 shows took place throughout the United Kingdom, and the year ended on 24 December, with a run of 16 consecutive nights at the Hammersmith Odeon in London. The 15 December show proved unique in that it was played without a drummer; Nigel Olsson was unable to perform that evening. The show on Christmas Eve featured an appearance by Kiki Dee on "Don't Go Breaking My Heart" and the encores, which included a version of "Jingle Bells".

John and the band's only performances in 1983 were eight shows that took place at the Sun City casino complex, near Johannesburg, South Africa, from 7-10 October and 12-15 October.

== Tour dates ==
Date	City	Country	Venue	Tickets sold / available	Revenue
Oceania
10 March 1982	Wellington	New Zealand	Athletic Park		
13 March 1982	Auckland	New Zealand	Western Springs Stadium		
16 March 1982	Sydney	Australia	Hordern Pavilion		
17 March 1982	Sydney	Australia	Hordern Pavilion		
18 March 1982	Sydney	Australia	Hordern Pavilion		
19 March 1982	Sydney	Australia	Hordern Pavilion		
20 March 1982	Sydney	Australia	Hordern Pavilion		
21 March 1982	Sydney	Australia	Hordern Pavilion		
23 March 1982	Brisbane	Australia	Brisbane Festival Hall		
24 March 1982	Brisbane	Australia	Brisbane Festival Hall		
29 March 1982	Melbourne	Australia	Melbourne Festival Hall		
30 March 1982	Melbourne	Australia	Melbourne Festival Hall		
3 April 1982	Adelaide	Australia	Memorial Drive Park		
7 April 1982	Perth	Australia	Perth Entertainment Centre		
Europe
30 April 1982	Stockholm	Sweden	Johanneshovs Isstadion		
2 May 1982	Helsinki	Finland	Helsinki Ice Hall		
4 May 1982	Drammen	Norway	Drammenshallen		
5 May 1982	Gothenburg	Sweden	Scandinavium		
6 May 1982	Copenhagen	Denmark	Brøndby Hall		
8 May 1982	Rotterdam	Netherlands	Rotterdam Ahoy Sportpaleis		
9 May 1982	Brussels	Belgium	Forest National		
10 May 1982	Brussels	Belgium	Forest National		
11 May 1982	Düsseldorf	West Germany	Philipshalle		
12 May 1982	Hamburg	West Germany	Alsterdorfer Sporthalle		
13 May 1982	West Berlin	West Germany	Deutschlandhalle		
14 May 1982	Cologne	West Germany	Cologne Sporthalle		
16 May 1982	Paris	France	Palais des Sports de Paris		
17 May 1982	Paris	France	Palais des Sports de Paris		
18 May 1982	Frankfurt	West Germany	Festhalle Frankfurt		
19 May 1982	Saarbrücken	West Germany	Saarlandhalle		
20 May 1982	Basel	Switzerland	St. Jakobshalle		
21 May 1982	Ludwigshafen	West Germany	Friedrich-Ebert-Halle		
23 May 1982	Munich	West Germany	Olympiahalle		
25 May 1982	Lyon	France	Halle Tony Garnier		
26 May 1982	Avignon	France	Parc des Expositions de Châteaublanc		
27 May 1982	Toulouse	France	Palais des Sports de Toulouse		
28 May 1982	Bordeaux	France	Salle Polyvalent		
29 May 1982	Nantes	France	Palais des Sports de Beaulieu		
30 May 1982	Lille	France	Espace Foire		
North America
12 June 1982	Morrison	United States	Red Rocks Amphitheatre	18,000 / 18,000	$247,500
13 June 1982	Morrison	United States	Red Rocks Amphitheatre	18,000 / 18,000	$247,500
15 June 1982	Salt Lake City	United States	Salt Palace		
17 June 1982	San Francisco	United States	San Francisco Civic Auditorium	6,713 / 6,713	$99,322
18 June 1982	Berkeley	United States	Hearst Greek Theatre	8,500 / 8,500	$114,750
19 June 1982	Irvine	United States	Irvine Meadows Amphitheatre		
20 June 1982	Irvine	United States	Irvine Meadows Amphitheatre		
23 June 1982	Las Vegas	United States	Aladdin Theatre		
25 June 1982	Los Angeles	United States	Hollywood Bowl	38,862 / 38,862	$547,303
26 June 1982	Los Angeles	United States	Hollywood Bowl	38,862 / 38,862	$547,303
27 June 1982	Los Angeles	United States	Hollywood Bowl	38,862 / 38,862	$547,303
29 June 1982	Phoenix	United States	Compton Terrace Amphitheatre	16,333 / 16,333	$183,073
1 July 1982	Tulsa	United States	Tulsa Assembly Center	8,688 / 8,992	$99,912
2 July 1982	Little Rock	United States	Barton Coliseum	8,867 / 8,867	$98,853
3 July 1982	Nashville	United States	Nashville Municipal Auditorium	9,546 / 9,546	$112,090
5 July 1982	St. Louis	United States	Checkerdome		
6 July 1982	Kansas City	United States	Starlight Theatre		
7 July 1982	Kansas City	United States	Starlight Theatre		
8 July 1982	Omaha	United States	Omaha Civic Auditorium	8,752 / 8,752	$99,486
9 July 1982	Saint Paul	United States	St. Paul Civic Center		
10 July 1982	Hoffman Estates	United States	Poplar Creek Music Theater		
11 July 1982	Hoffman Estates	United States	Poplar Creek Music Theater		
13 July 1982	Cuyahoga Falls	United States	Blossom Music Center		
15 July 1982	Clarkston	United States	Pine Knob Music Theatre		
16 July 1982	Clarkston	United States	Pine Knob Music Theatre		
17 July 1982	Clarkston	United States	Pine Knob Music Theatre		
18 July 1982	Indianapolis	United States	Indiana Convention Center	9,223 / 9,223	$111,616
20 July 1982	Atlanta	United States	Omni Coliseum	15,147 / 15,147	$173,851
21 July 1982	Landover	United States	Capital Centre		
22 July 1982	Columbia	United States	Merriweather Post Pavilion		
23 July 1982	Columbia	United States	Merriweather Post Pavilion		
24 July 1982	Hartford	United States	Hartford Civic Center	15,558 / 15,558	$174,079
25 July 1982	Saratoga Springs	United States	Saratoga Performing Arts Center		
27 July 1982	Philadelphia	United States	Mann Center for the Performing Arts	13,037 / 13,037	$121,464
29 July 1982	Toronto	Canada	Maple Leaf Gardens	15,290 / 16,000	$201,077
30 July 1982	Ottawa	Canada	Ottawa Civic Centre	8,778 / 8,778	$131,670
31 July 1982	Québec City	Canada	Colisée de Québec		
1 August 1982	Montréal	Canada	Forum de Montréal		
3 August 1982	Boston	United States	Boston Garden	14,218 / 15,500	$185,112
4 August 1982	New York City	United States	Madison Square Garden		
5 August 1982	New York City	United States	Madison Square Garden		
6 August 1982	New York City	United States	Madison Square Garden		
Europe
2 November 1982	Newcastle	England	Newcastle City Hall		
3 November 1982	Newcastle	England	Newcastle City Hall		
4 November 1982	Edinburgh	Scotland	Edinburgh Playhouse		
5 November 1982	Edinburgh	Scotland	Edinburgh Playhouse		
6 November 1982	Dundee	Scotland	Caird Hall		
7 November 1982	Glasgow	Scotland	Glasgow Apollo Theatre		
8 November 1982	Glasgow	Scotland	Glasgow Apollo Theatre		
10 November 1982	Sheffield	England	Sheffield City Hall		
11 November 1982	Sheffield	England	Sheffield City Hall		
13 November 1982	Liverpool	England	Liverpool Empire Theatre		
14 November 1982	Liverpool	England	Liverpool Empire Theatre		
15 November 1982	Blackpool	England	Blackpool Opera House		
16 November 1982	Blackpool	England	Blackpool Opera House		
17 November 1982	Manchester	England	Manchester Apollo		
18 November 1982	Manchester	England	Manchester Apollo		
19 November 1982	Manchester	England	Manchester Apollo		
21 November 1982	Birmingham	England	Birmingham Odeon		
22 November 1982	Birmingham	England	Birmingham Odeon		
23 November 1982	Birmingham	England	Birmingham Odeon		
25 November 1982	Cardiff	Wales	St David's Hall		
26 November 1982	Cardiff	Wales	St David's Hall		
27 November 1982	Nottingham	England	Nottingham Royal Concert Hall		
28 November 1982	Nottingham	England	Nottingham Royal Concert Hall		
3 December 1982	Bournemouth	England	Bournemouth Winter Gardens		
4 December 1982	Bournemouth	England	Bournemouth Winter Gardens		
5 December 1982	Southampton	England	Gaumont Theatre		
6 December 1982	Southampton	England	Gaumont Theatre		
7 December 1982	Brighton	England	The Brighton Centre		
9 December 1982	London	England	Hammersmith Odeon		
10 December 1982	London	England	Hammersmith Odeon		
11 December 1982	London	England	Hammersmith Odeon		
12 December 1982	London	England	Hammersmith Odeon		
13 December 1982	London	England	Hammersmith Odeon		
14 December 1982	London	England	Hammersmith Odeon		
15 December 1982	London	England	Hammersmith Odeon		
16 December 1982	London	England	Hammersmith Odeon		
17 December 1982	London	England	Hammersmith Odeon		
18 December 1982	London	England	Hammersmith Odeon		
19 December 1982	London	England	Hammersmith Odeon		
20 December 1982	London	England	Hammersmith Odeon		
21 December 1982	London	England	Hammersmith Odeon		
22 December 1982	London	England	Hammersmith Odeon		
23 December 1982	London	England	Hammersmith Odeon		
24 December 1982	London	England	Hammersmith Odeon		
Africa
7 October 1983	Johannesburg	South Africa	Sun City Casino		
8 October 1983	Johannesburg	South Africa	Sun City Casino		
9 October 1983	Johannesburg	South Africa	Sun City Casino		
10 October 1983	Johannesburg	South Africa	Sun City Casino		
12 October 1983	Johannesburg	South Africa	Sun City Casino		
13 October 1983	Johannesburg	South Africa	Sun City Casino		
14 October 1983	Johannesburg	South Africa	Sun City Casino		
15 October 1983	Johannesburg	South Africa	Sun City Casino		

== Personnel ==
- Elton John – piano, electric piano (on "Daniel"), lead vocals
- Davey Johnstone – guitars, backing vocals
- Dee Murray – bass guitar, backing vocals
- Nigel Olsson – drums, percussion, backing vocals

== Setlists ==
Standard Oceania setlist
1. Funeral for a Friend/Love Lies Bleeding
2. Captain Fantastic and the Brown Dirt Cowboy
3. Gotta Get a Meal Ticket
4. Someone Saved My Life Tonight
5. Better Off Dead
6. Ball and Chain
7. Empty Garden
8. Goodbye Yellow Brick Road
9. Song for Guy
10. Nobody Wins
11. Elton's Song
12. Chloe
13. Where to Now St. Peter?
14. Blue Eyes
15. Bennie and the Jets
16. Where Have All The Good Times Gone?
17. Rocket Man
18. Teacher I Need You
19. All Quiet on the Western Front
20. Pinball Wizard
21. Your Song
22. Saturday Night's Alright for Fighting
23. Crocodile Rock
24. Rock And Roll Medley: Whole Lotta Shakin' Going On/I Saw Her Standing There/Twist And Shout
Standard European setlist
1. Funeral For A Friend/Love Lies Bleeding
2. All The Girls Love Alice
3. Captain Fantastic And The Brown Dirt Cowboy
4. Someone Saved My Life Tonight
5. Better Off Dead
6. Ball And Chain
7. Empty Garden
8. Goodbye Yellow Brick Road
9. The Bitch Is Back
10. Dixie Lilly
11. Song For Guy
12. Nobody Wins
13. Elton's Song
14. Chloe
15. Where To Now St. Peter?
16. Blue Eyes
17. Where Have All The Good Times Gone?
18. Rocket Man
19. Bennie And The Jets
20. Just Like Belgium
  Performed only in Belgium
21. Teacher I Need You
22. All Quiet On The Western Front
23. Pinball Wizard
24. Your Song
25. Saturday Night's Alright for Fighting
26. Daniel
27. Crocodile Rock
28. Sorry Seems To Be The Hardest Word
29. Rock and Roll Medley: Whole Lotta Shakin' Going On/I Saw Her Standing There/Twist And Shout
Standard North American setlist
1. Funeral For A Friend/Love Lies Bleeding
2. All The Girls Love Alice
3. Someone Saved My Life Tonight
4. Better Off Dead
5. Ball And Chain
6. Empty Garden
7. Goodbye Yellow Brick Road
8. The Bitch Is Back
9. Pinball Wizard
10. Ticking
11. Elton's Song
12. Chloe
13. Where To Now St. Peter?
14. Blue Eyes
15. Where Have All The Good Times Gone?
16. Rocket Man
17. Bennie And The Jets
18. Teacher I Need You
19. Dear John
20. Your Song
21. Saturday Night's Alright for Fighting
22. Daniel
23. Crocodile Rock
24. Rock and Roll Medley: Whole Lotta Shakin' Going On/I Saw Her Standing There/Twist And Shout
Standard UK setlist
1. Funeral For A Friend/Love Lies Bleeding
2. All The Girls Love Alice
3. Someone Saved My Life Tonight
4. Better Off Dead
5. Ball And Chain
6. Empty Garden
7. Goodbye Yellow Brick Road
8. The Bitch Is Back
9. Pinball Wizard
10. Song For Guy
11. Elton's Song
12. Chloe
13. Where To Now St. Peter?
14. Blue Eyes
15. Where Have All The Good Times Gone?
16. Rocket Man
17. Bennie And The Jets
18. All Quiet On the Western Front
19. Your Song
20. Saturday Night's Alright for Fighting
21. Daniel
22. Crocodile Rock
23. Don't Go Breaking My Heart (with Kiki Dee)
  Performed only on 24 December
24. Rock and Roll Medley: Whole Lotta Shakin' Going On/I Saw Her Standing There/Twist And Shout
