= All Quiet on the Western Front (song) =

Single by Elton John

from the album Jump Up!
- B-side: "Where Have All the Good Times Gone" (Alternate Version)
- Released: November 1982
- Length: 6:00
- Label: Geffen (US); Rocket (UK)
- Songwriter(s): Elton John, Bernie Taupin
- Producer(s): Chris Thomas

Elton John singles chronology
"Ball And Chain" (1982)	"All Quiet on the Western Front" (1982)	"I Guess That's Why They Call It the Blues" (1983)

"All Quiet on the Western Front" is a song by British musician Elton John with lyrics by Bernie Taupin. It is the closing track of his 1982 album, Jump Up!. It was also released as a single in the UK without charting.

== Background ==
"All Quiet on the Western Front" is an anti-war song about World War I, and named after the book of the same name. The song also ends in a big orchestral finale including a church organ chord sequence played by James Newton Howard on a synthesizer, which can be said to be reminiscent of his earlier album closers such as "The King Must Die" and "Burn Down the Mission", and a chorus sung by the Choir of St Paul's Cathedral, London.

The song's only live performances came during John's world tour during 1982, outside North America. At a concert on Christmas Eve of the same year at the Hammersmith Apollo, London, John jokingly announced that, at the time, it was "the worst-selling single in Phonogram's history".

The version issued on single is shorter; it also appeared on the 1982 compilation album Love Songs. The B-side contains a rockier version of album track "Where Have All the Good Times Gone"; it appeared decades later on the Elton: Jewel Box compilation album.

== See also ==
- List of anti-war songs
