= List of New Zealand rugby union test matches =

The New Zealand national rugby union team, commonly known as the All Blacks, played their first test match in 1903.

== Legend ==
Win Loss Draw

== Overall ==
New Zealand's overall test match record against all nations, updated to 14 November 2026, is as follows:

Decade	Games				
Decade	Played	Won	Lost	Drawn	Win percentage
1900s	14	11	1	2	78.57%
1910s	10	8	2	0	80%
1920s	14	7	6	1	50%
1930s	22	14	7	1	63.64%
1940s	10	4	6	0	40%
1950s	30	22	7	1	73.33%
1960s	42	35	4	3	83.33%
1970s	45	27	15	3	60%
1980s	57	45	9	3	78.95%
1990s	92	68	22	2	73.91%
2000s	122	100	21	1	81.97%
2010s	133	116	13	4	87.22%
2020s	83	58	23	2	69.88%
Overall	675	516	136	23	76.44%

== 1900s ==
1900s record

Games played	Won	Lost	Drawn	Win percentage
14	11	1	2	78.57%

Date	Opponent	F	A	Venue	City	Winner
1903-08-15	Australia	22	3	Sydney Cricket Ground	Sydney	(New Zealand)
1904-08-13	British Isles	9	3	Athletic Park	Wellington	(New Zealand)
1905-09-02	Australia	14	3	Tahuna Park	Dunedin	(New Zealand)
1905-11-18	Scotland	12	7	Inverleith	Edinburgh	(New Zealand)
1905-11-25	Ireland	15	0	Lansdowne Road	Dublin	(New Zealand)
1905-12-02	England	15	0	Crystal Palace	London	(New Zealand)
1905-12-16	Wales	0	3	Cardiff Arms Park	Cardiff	Wales
1906-01-01	France	38	8	Parc des Princes	Paris	(New Zealand)
1907-07-20	Australia	26	6	Sydney Cricket Ground	Sydney	(New Zealand)
1907-08-03	Australia	14	5	The Gabba	Brisbane	(New Zealand)
1907-08-10	Australia	5	5	Sydney Cricket Ground	Sydney	Draw
1908-06-06	British Isles	32	5	Carisbrook	Dunedin	(New Zealand)
1908-06-27	British Isles	3	3	Athletic Park	Wellington	Draw
1908-07-25	British Isles	29	0	Potter's Park	Auckland	(New Zealand)

== 1910s ==
1910s record

Games played	Won	Lost	Drawn	Win percentage
10	8	2	0	80%

Date	Opponent	F	A	Venue	City	Winner
1910-06-25	Australia	6	0	Sydney Cricket Ground	Sydney	(New Zealand)
1910-06-27	Australia	0	11	Sydney Cricket Ground	Sydney	Australia
1910-07-02	Australia	28	13	Sydney Cricket Ground	Sydney	(New Zealand)
1913-09-06	Australia	30	5	Athletic Park	Wellington	(New Zealand)
1913-09-13	Australia	25	13	Carisbrook	Dunedin	(New Zealand)
1913-09-20	Australia	5	16	Lancaster Park	Christchurch	Australia
1913-11-15	United States	51	3	California Field	Berkeley	(New Zealand)
1914-07-18	Australia	5	0	Sydney Sports Ground	Sydney	(New Zealand)
1914-08-01	Australia	17	0	The Gabba	Brisbane	(New Zealand)
1914-08-15	Australia	22	7	Sydney Sports Ground	Sydney	(New Zealand)

== 1920s ==
1920s record

Games played	Won	Lost	Drawn	Win percentage
14	7	6	1	50%

Date	Opponent	F	A	Venue	City	Winner
1921-08-13	South Africa	13	5	Carisbrook	Dunedin	(New Zealand)
1921-08-27	South Africa	5	9	Eden Park	Auckland	South Africa
1921-09-17	South Africa	0	0	Athletic Park	Wellington	Draw
1924-11-01	Ireland	6	0	Lansdowne Road	Dublin	(New Zealand)
1924-11-29	Wales	19	0	St. Helen's	Swansea	(New Zealand)
1925-01-03	England	17	11	Twickenham	London	(New Zealand)
1925-01-18	France	30	6	Ponts Jumeaux	Toulouse	(New Zealand)
1928-06-30	South Africa	0	17	Kingsmead	Durban	South Africa
1928-07-21	South Africa	7	6	Ellis Park	Johannesburg	(New Zealand)
1928-08-18	South Africa	6	11	Crusader Park	Port Elizabeth	South Africa
1928-09-01	South Africa	13	5	Newlands	Cape Town	(New Zealand)
1929-07-06	Australia	8	9	Sydney Cricket Ground	Sydney	Australia
1929-07-20	Australia	9	17	Exhibition Ground	Brisbane	Australia
1929-07-27	Australia	13	15	Sydney Cricket Ground	Sydney	Australia

== 1930s ==
1930s record

Games played	Won	Lost	Drawn	Win percentage
22	14	7	1	63.64%

Date	Opponent	F	A	Venue	City	Winner
1930-06-21	British Isles	3	6	Carisbrook	Dunedin	(United Kingdom) Lions
1930-07-05	British Isles	13	10	Lancaster Park	Christchurch	(New Zealand)
1930-07-26	British Isles	15	10	Eden Park	Auckland	(New Zealand)
1930-08-09	British Isles	22	8	Athletic Park	Wellington	(New Zealand)
1931-09-12	Australia	20	13	Eden Park	Auckland	(New Zealand)
1932-07-02	Australia	17	22	Sydney Cricket Ground	Sydney	Australia
1932-07-16	Australia	21	3	Exhibition Ground	Brisbane	(New Zealand)
1932-07-23	Australia	21	13	Sydney Cricket Ground	Sydney	(New Zealand)
1934-08-11	Australia	11	25	Sydney Cricket Ground	Sydney	Australia
1934-08-25	Australia	3	3	Sydney Cricket Ground	Sydney	Draw
1935-11-23	Scotland	18	8	Murrayfield	Edinburgh	(New Zealand)
1935-12-07	Ireland	17	9	Lansdowne Road	Dublin	(New Zealand)
1935-12-21	Wales	12	13	Cardiff Arms Park	Cardiff	Wales
1936-01-04	England	0	13	Twickenham	London	England
1936-09-05	Australia	11	6	Athletic Park	Wellington	(New Zealand)
1936-09-12	Australia	38	13	Carisbrook	Dunedin	(New Zealand)
1937-08-14	South Africa	13	7	Athletic Park	Wellington	(New Zealand)
1937-09-04	South Africa	6	13	Lancaster Park	Christchurch	South Africa
1937-09-25	South Africa	6	17	Eden Park	Auckland	South Africa
1938-07-23	Australia	24	9	Sydney Cricket Ground	Sydney	(New Zealand)
1938-08-06	Australia	20	14	Exhibition Ground	Brisbane	(New Zealand)
1938-08-13	Australia	14	6	Sydney Cricket Ground	Sydney	(New Zealand)

== 1940s ==
1940s record

Games played	Won	Lost	Drawn	Win percentage
10	4	6	0	40%

Date	Opponent	F	A	Venue	City	Winner
1946-09-14	Australia	31	8	Carisbrook	Dunedin	(New Zealand)
1946-09-28	Australia	14	10	Eden Park	Auckland	(New Zealand)
1947-06-14	Australia	13	5	Exhibition Ground	Brisbane	(New Zealand)
1947-06-28	Australia	27	14	Sydney Cricket Ground	Sydney	(New Zealand)
1949-07-16	South Africa	11	15	Newlands	Cape Town	South Africa
1949-08-13	South Africa	6	12	Ellis Park	Johannesburg	South Africa
1949-09-03	Australia	6	11	Athletic Park	Wellington	Australia
1949-09-03	South Africa	3	9	Kingsmead	Durban	South Africa
1949-09-17	South Africa	8	11	Crusader Park	Port Elizabeth	South Africa
1949-09-24	Australia	9	16	Eden Park	Auckland	Australia

== 1950s ==
1950s record

Games played	Won	Lost	Drawn	Win percentage
30	22	7	1	73.33%

Date	Opponent	F	A	Venue	City	Winner
1950-05-27	British Isles	9	9	Carisbrook	Dunedin	Draw
1950-06-10	British Isles	8	0	Lancaster Park	Christchurch	(New Zealand)
1950-07-01	British Isles	6	3	Athletic Park	Wellington	(New Zealand)
1950-07-29	British Isles	11	8	Eden Park	Auckland	(New Zealand)
1951-06-23	Australia	8	0	Sydney Cricket Ground	Sydney	(New Zealand)
1951-07-07	Australia	17	11	Sydney Cricket Ground	Sydney	(New Zealand)
1951-07-21	Australia	16	6	The Gabba	Brisbane	(New Zealand)
1952-09-06	Australia	9	14	Lancaster Park	Christchurch	Australia
1952-09-13	Australia	15	8	Athletic Park	Wellington	(New Zealand)
1953-12-19	Wales	8	13	Cardiff Arms Park	Cardiff	Wales
1954-01-09	Ireland	14	3	Lansdowne Road	Dublin	(New Zealand)
1954-01-30	England	5	0	Twickenham	London	(New Zealand)
1954-02-13	Scotland	3	0	Murrayfield	Edinburgh	(New Zealand)
1954-02-27	France	0	3	Stade Olympique	Colombes	France
1955-08-20	Australia	16	8	Athletic Park	Wellington	(New Zealand)
1955-09-03	Australia	8	0	Carisbrook	Dunedin	(New Zealand)
1955-09-17	Australia	3	8	Eden Park	Auckland	Australia
1956-07-14	South Africa	10	6	Carisbrook	Dunedin	(New Zealand)
1956-08-04	South Africa	3	8	Athletic Park	Wellington	South Africa
1956-08-18	South Africa	17	10	Lancaster Park	Christchurch	(New Zealand)
1956-09-01	South Africa	11	5	Eden Park	Auckland	(New Zealand)
1957-05-25	Australia	25	11	Sydney Cricket Ground	Sydney	(New Zealand)
1957-06-01	Australia	22	9	Exhibition Ground	Brisbane	(New Zealand)
1958-08-23	Australia	25	3	Athletic Park	Wellington	(New Zealand)
1958-09-06	Australia	3	6	Lancaster Park	Christchurch	Australia
1958-09-20	Australia	17	8	Epsom Showgrounds	Auckland	(New Zealand)
1959-07-18	British Isles	18	17	Carisbrook	Dunedin	(New Zealand)
1959-08-15	British Isles	11	8	Athletic Park	Wellington	(New Zealand)
1959-08-29	British Isles	22	8	Lancaster Park	Christchurch	(New Zealand)
1959-09-19	British Isles	6	9	Eden Park	Auckland	(United Kingdom) Lions

== 1960s ==
1960s record

Games played	Won	Lost	Drawn	Win percentage
42	35	4	3	83.33%

Date	Opponent	F	A	Venue	City	Winner
1960-06-25	South Africa	0	13	Ellis Park	Johannesburg	South Africa
1960-07-23	South Africa	11	3	Newlands	Cape Town	(New Zealand)
1960-08-13	South Africa	11	11	Free State Stadium	Bloemfontein	Draw
1960-08-27	South Africa	3	8	Boet Erasmus Stadium	Port Elizabeth	South Africa
1961-07-22	France	13	6	Eden Park	Auckland	(New Zealand)
1961-08-05	France	5	3	Athletic Park	Wellington	(New Zealand)
1961-08-19	France	32	3	Lancaster Park	Christchurch	(New Zealand)
1962-05-26	Australia	20	6	Exhibition Ground	Brisbane	(New Zealand)
1962-06-04	Australia	14	5	Sydney Cricket Ground	Sydney	(New Zealand)
1962-08-25	Australia	9	9	Athletic Park	Wellington	Draw
1962-09-08	Australia	3	0	Carisbrook	Dunedin	(New Zealand)
1962-09-22	Australia	16	8	Eden Park	Auckland	(New Zealand)
1963-05-25	England	21	11	Eden Park	Auckland	(New Zealand)
1963-06-01	England	9	6	Lancaster Park	Christchurch	(New Zealand)
1963-12-07	Ireland	6	5	Lansdowne Road	Dublin	(New Zealand)
1963-12-21	Wales	6	0	Cardiff Arms Park	Cardiff	(New Zealand)
1964-01-04	England	14	0	Twickenham	London	(New Zealand)
1964-01-18	Scotland	0	0	Murrayfield	Edinburgh	Draw
1964-02-08	France	12	3	Stade Olympique	Colombes	(New Zealand)
1964-08-15	Australia	14	9	Carisbrook	Dunedin	(New Zealand)
1964-08-22	Australia	18	3	Lancaster Park	Christchurch	(New Zealand)
1964-08-29	Australia	5	20	Athletic Park	Wellington	Australia
1965-07-31	South Africa	6	3	Athletic Park	Wellington	(New Zealand)
1965-08-21	South Africa	13	0	Carisbrook	Dunedin	(New Zealand)
1965-09-04	South Africa	16	19	Lancaster Park	Christchurch	South Africa
1965-09-18	South Africa	20	3	Eden Park	Auckland	(New Zealand)
1966-07-16	British Isles	20	3	Carisbrook	Dunedin	(New Zealand)
1966-08-06	British Isles	16	12	Athletic Park	Wellington	(New Zealand)
1966-08-27	British Isles	19	6	Lancaster Park	Christchurch	(New Zealand)
1966-09-10	British Isles	24	11	Eden Park	Auckland	(New Zealand)
1967-08-19	Australia	29	9	Athletic Park	Wellington	(New Zealand)
1967-11-04	England	23	11	Twickenham	London	(New Zealand)
1967-11-11	Wales	13	6	Cardiff Arms Park	Cardiff	(New Zealand)
1967-11-25	France	21	15	Stade Olympique	Colombes	(New Zealand)
1967-12-02	Scotland	14	3	Murrayfield	Edinburgh	(New Zealand)
1968-06-15	Australia	27	11	Sydney Cricket Ground	Sydney	(New Zealand)
1968-06-22	Australia	19	18	Ballymore	Brisbane	(New Zealand)
1968-07-13	France	12	9	Lancaster Park	Christchurch	(New Zealand)
1968-07-27	France	9	3	Athletic Park	Wellington	(New Zealand)
1968-08-10	France	19	12	Eden Park	Auckland	(New Zealand)
1969-05-31	Wales	19	0	Lancaster Park	Christchurch	(New Zealand)
1969-06-14	Wales	33	12	Eden Park	Auckland	(New Zealand)

== 1970s ==
1970s record

Games played	Won	Lost	Drawn	Win percentage
45	27	15	3	60%

Date	Opponent	F	A	Venue	City	Winner
1970-07-25	South Africa	6	17	Loftus Versfeld	Pretoria	South Africa
1970-08-08	South Africa	9	8	Newlands	Cape Town	(New Zealand)
1970-08-29	South Africa	3	14	Boet Erasmus Stadium	Port Elizabeth	South Africa
1970-09-12	South Africa	17	20	Ellis Park	Johannesburg	South Africa
1971-06-26	British Isles	3	9	Carisbrook	Dunedin	Lions
1971-07-10	British Isles	22	12	Lancaster Park	Christchurch	(New Zealand)
1971-07-31	British Isles	3	13	Athletic Park	Wellington	Lions
1971-08-14	British Isles	14	14	Eden Park	Auckland	Draw
1972-08-19	Australia	29	6	Athletic Park	Wellington	(New Zealand)
1972-09-02	Australia	30	17	Lancaster Park	Christchurch	(New Zealand)
1972-09-16	Australia	38	3	Eden Park	Auckland	(New Zealand)
1972-12-02	Wales	19	16	Cardiff Arms Park	Cardiff	(New Zealand)
1972-12-16	Scotland	14	9	Murrayfield	Edinburgh	(New Zealand)
1973-01-06	England	9	0	Twickenham	London	(New Zealand)
1973-01-20	Ireland	10	10	Lansdowne Road	Dublin	Draw
1973-02-10	France	6	13	Parc des Princes	Paris	France
1973-09-15	England	10	16	Eden Park	Auckland	England
1974-05-25	Australia	11	6	Sydney Cricket Ground	Sydney	(New Zealand)
1974-06-01	Australia	16	16	Ballymore	Brisbane	Draw
1974-06-08	Australia	16	6	Sydney Cricket Ground	Sydney	(New Zealand)
1974-11-23	Ireland	15	6	Lansdowne Road	Dublin	(New Zealand)
1975-06-14	Scotland	24	0	Eden Park	Auckland	(New Zealand)
1976-06-05	Ireland	11	3	Athletic Park	Wellington	(New Zealand)
1976-07-24	South Africa	7	16	Kings Park Stadium	Durban	South Africa
1976-08-14	South Africa	15	9	Free State Stadium	Bloemfontein	(New Zealand)
1976-09-04	South Africa	10	15	Newlands	Cape Town	South Africa
1976-09-18	South Africa	14	15	Ellis Park	Johannesburg	South Africa
1977-06-18	British Isles	16	12	Athletic Park	Wellington	(New Zealand)
1977-07-09	British Isles	9	13	Lancaster Park	Christchurch	Lions
1977-07-30	British Isles	19	7	Carisbrook	Dunedin	(New Zealand)
1977-08-13	British Isles	10	9	Eden Park	Auckland	(New Zealand)
1977-11-11	France	13	18	Stade de Toulouse	Toulouse	France
1977-11-19	France	15	3	Parc des Princes	Paris	(New Zealand)
1978-08-19	Australia	13	12	Athletic Park	Wellington	(New Zealand)
1978-08-26	Australia	22	6	Lancaster Park	Christchurch	(New Zealand)
1978-09-09	Australia	16	30	Eden Park	Auckland	Australia
1978-11-04	Ireland	10	6	Lansdowne Road	Dublin	(New Zealand)
1978-11-11	Wales	13	12	Cardiff Arms Park	Cardiff	(New Zealand)
1978-11-25	England	16	6	Twickenham	London	(New Zealand)
1978-12-09	Scotland	18	9	Murrayfield	Edinburgh	(New Zealand)
1979-07-07	France	23	9	Lancaster Park	Christchurch	(New Zealand)
1979-07-14	France	19	24	Eden Park	Auckland	France
1979-07-28	Australia	6	12	Sydney Cricket Ground	Sydney	Australia
1979-11-10	Scotland	20	6	Murrayfield	Edinburgh	(New Zealand)
1979-11-24	England	10	9	Twickenham	London	(New Zealand)

== 1980s ==
1980s record

Games played	Won	Lost	Drawn	Win percentage
57	45	9	3	78.95%

Date	Opponent	F	A	Venue	City	Winner
1980-06-21	Australia	9	13	Sydney Cricket Ground	Sydney	Australia
1980-06-28	Australia	12	9	Ballymore	Brisbane	(New Zealand)
1980-07-12	Australia	10	26	Sydney Cricket Ground	Sydney	Australia
1980-11-01	Wales	23	3	Cardiff Arms Park	Cardiff	(New Zealand)
1981-06-13	Scotland	11	4	Carisbrook	Dunedin	(New Zealand)
1981-06-20	Scotland	40	15	Eden Park	Auckland	(New Zealand)
1981-08-15	South Africa	14	9	Lancaster Park	Christchurch	(New Zealand)
1981-08-29	South Africa	12	24	Athletic Park	Wellington	South Africa
1981-09-12	South Africa	25	22	Eden Park	Auckland	(New Zealand)
1981-10-24	Romania	14	6	Stadionul Dinamo	Bucharest	(New Zealand)
1981-11-14	France	13	9	Stade de Toulouse	Toulouse	(New Zealand)
1981-11-21	France	18	6	Parc des Princes	Paris	(New Zealand)
1982-08-14	Australia	23	16	Lancaster Park	Christchurch	(New Zealand)
1982-08-28	Australia	16	19	Athletic Park	Wellington	Australia
1982-09-11	Australia	33	18	Eden Park	Auckland	(New Zealand)
1983-06-04	British Isles	16	12	Lancaster Park	Christchurch	(New Zealand)
1983-06-18	British Isles	9	0	Athletic Park	Wellington	(New Zealand)
1983-07-02	British Isles	15	8	Carisbrook	Dunedin	(New Zealand)
1983-07-16	British Isles	38	6	Eden Park	Auckland	(New Zealand)
1983-08-20	Australia	18	8	Sydney Cricket Ground	Sydney	(New Zealand)
1983-11-12	Scotland	25	25	Murrayfield	Edinburgh	Draw
1983-11-19	England	9	15	Twickenham	London	England
1984-06-16	France	10	9	Lancaster Park	Christchurch	(New Zealand)
1984-06-23	France	31	18	Eden Park	Auckland	(New Zealand)
1984-07-21	Australia	9	16	Sydney Cricket Ground	Sydney	Australia
1984-08-04	Australia	19	15	Ballymore	Brisbane	(New Zealand)
1984-08-18	Australia	25	24	Sydney Cricket Ground	Sydney	(New Zealand)
1985-06-01	England	18	13	Lancaster Park	Christchurch	(New Zealand)
1985-06-08	England	42	15	Athletic Park	Wellington	(New Zealand)
1985-06-29	Australia	10	9	Eden Park	Auckland	(New Zealand)
1985-10-26	Argentina	33	20	Ferrocaril Oeste	Buenos Aires	(New Zealand)
1985-11-02	Argentina	21	21	Ferrocaril Oeste	Buenos Aires	Draw
1986-06-28	France	18	9	Lancaster Park	Christchurch	(New Zealand)
1986-08-09	Australia	12	13	Athletic Park	Wellington	Australia
1986-08-23	Australia	13	12	Carisbrook	Dunedin	(New Zealand)
1986-09-06	Australia	9	22	Eden Park	Auckland	Australia
1986-11-08	France	19	7	Stade de Toulouse	Toulouse	(New Zealand)
1986-11-15	France	3	16	Stade de la Beaujoire	Nantes	France
1987-05-22	Italy	70	6	Eden Park	Auckland	(New Zealand)
1987-05-27	Fiji	74	13	Lancaster Park	Christchurch	(New Zealand)
1987-06-01	Argentina	46	15	Athletic Park	Wellington	(New Zealand)
1987-06-06	Scotland	30	3	Lancaster Park	Christchurch	(New Zealand)
1987-06-14	Wales	49	6	Ballymore	Brisbane	(New Zealand)
1987-06-20	France	29	9	Eden Park	Auckland	(New Zealand)
1987-07-25	Australia	30	16	Concord Oval	Sydney	(New Zealand)
1988-05-28	Wales	52	3	Lancaster Park	Christchurch	(New Zealand)
1988-06-11	Wales	54	9	Eden Park	Auckland	(New Zealand)
1988-07-03	Australia	32	7	Concord Oval	Sydney	(New Zealand)
1988-07-16	Australia	19	19	Ballymore	Brisbane	Draw
1988-07-30	Australia	30	9	Concord Oval	Sydney	(New Zealand)
1989-06-17	France	25	17	Lancaster Park	Christchurch	(New Zealand)
1989-07-01	France	34	20	Eden Park	Auckland	(New Zealand)
1989-07-15	Argentina	60	9	Carisbrook	Dunedin	(New Zealand)
1989-07-29	Argentina	49	12	Athletic Park	Wellington	(New Zealand)
1989-08-05	Australia	24	12	Eden Park	Auckland	(New Zealand)
1989-11-04	Wales	34	9	National Stadium	Cardiff	(New Zealand)
1989-11-18	Ireland	23	6	Lansdowne Road	Dublin	(New Zealand)

== 1990s ==
1990s record

Games played	Won	Lost	Drawn	Win percentage
92	68	22	2	73.91%

Date	Opponent	F	A	Venue	City	Winner
1990-06-16	Scotland	31	16	Carisbrook	Dunedin	(New Zealand)
1990-06-23	Scotland	21	18	Eden Park	Auckland	(New Zealand)
1990-07-21	Australia	21	6	Lancaster Park	Christchurch	(New Zealand)
1990-08-04	Australia	27	17	Eden Park	Auckland	(New Zealand)
1990-08-18	Australia	9	21	Athletic Park	Wellington	Australia
1990-11-03	France	24	3	Stade Marcel Saupin	Nantes	(New Zealand)
1990-11-10	France	30	12	Parc des Princes	Paris	(New Zealand)
1991-07-06	Argentina	28	14	José Amalfitani Stadium	Buenos Aires	(New Zealand)
1991-07-13	Argentina	36	6	José Amalfitani Stadium	Buenos Aires	(New Zealand)
1991-08-10	Australia	12	21	Sydney Football Stadium	Sydney	Australia
1991-08-24	Australia	6	3	Eden Park	Auckland	(New Zealand)
1991-10-03	England	18	12	Twickenham	London	(New Zealand)
1991-10-08	United States	46	6	Kingsholm	Gloucester	(New Zealand)
1991-10-13	Italy	31	21	Welford Road	Leicester	(New Zealand)
1991-10-20	Canada	29	13	Stadium Lille Métropole	Lille	(New Zealand)
1991-10-27	Australia	6	16	Lansdowne Road	Dublin	Australia
1991-10-30	Scotland	13	6	National Stadium	Cardiff	(New Zealand)
1992-04-18	World XV	14	28	Lancaster Park	Christchurch	World XV
1992-04-22	World XV	54	26	Athletic Park	Wellington	(New Zealand)
1992-04-25	World XV	26	15	Eden Park	Auckland	(New Zealand)
1992-05-30	Ireland	24	21	Carisbrook	Dunedin	(New Zealand)
1992-06-06	Ireland	59	6	Athletic Park	Wellington	(New Zealand)
1992-07-04	Australia	15	16	Sydney Football Stadium	Sydney	Australia
1992-07-19	Australia	17	19	Ballymore	Brisbane	Australia
1992-07-25	Australia	26	23	Sydney Football Stadium	Sydney	(New Zealand)
1992-08-15	South Africa	27	24	Ellis Park	Johannesburg	(New Zealand)
1993-06-12	British Isles	20	18	Lancaster Park	Christchurch	(New Zealand)
1993-06-26	British Isles	7	20	Athletic Park	Wellington	Lions
1993-07-03	British Isles	30	13	Eden Park	Auckland	(New Zealand)
1993-07-17	Australia	25	10	Carisbrook	Dunedin	(New Zealand)
1993-07-31	Western Samoa	35	13	Eden Park	Auckland	(New Zealand)
1993-11-20	Scotland	51	15	Murrayfield	Edinburgh	(New Zealand)
1993-11-27	England	9	15	Twickenham	London	England
1994-06-26	France	8	22	Lancaster Park	Christchurch	France
1994-07-03	France	20	23	Eden Park	Auckland	France
1994-07-09	South Africa	22	14	Carisbrook	Dunedin	(New Zealand)
1994-07-23	South Africa	13	9	Athletic Park	Wellington	(New Zealand)
1994-08-06	South Africa	18	18	Eden Park	Auckland	Draw
1994-08-17	Australia	16	20	Sydney Football Stadium	Sydney	Australia
1995-04-22	Canada	73	7	Eden Park	Auckland	(New Zealand)
1995-05-27	Ireland	43	19	Ellis Park	Johannesburg	(New Zealand)
1995-05-31	Wales	34	9	Ellis Park	Johannesburg	(New Zealand)
1995-06-04	Japan	145	17	Free State Stadium	Bloemfontein	(New Zealand)
1995-06-11	Scotland	48	30	Loftus Versfeld	Pretoria	(New Zealand)
1995-06-18	England	45	29	Newlands	Cape Town	(New Zealand)
1995-06-24	South Africa	12	15	Ellis Park	Johannesburg	South Africa
1995-07-22	Australia	28	16	Eden Park	Auckland	(New Zealand)
1995-07-29	Australia	34	23	Sydney Football Stadium	Sydney	(New Zealand)
1995-10-28	Italy	70	6	Campo Arcoveggio	Bologna	(New Zealand)
1995-11-11	France	15	22	Stade de Toulouse	Toulouse	France
1995-11-18	France	37	12	Parc des Princes	Paris	(New Zealand)
1996-06-07	Western Samoa	51	10	McLean Park	Napier	(New Zealand)
1996-06-15	Scotland	62	31	Carisbrook	Dunedin	(New Zealand)
1996-06-22	Scotland	36	12	Eden Park	Auckland	(New Zealand)
1996-07-06	Australia	43	6	Athletic Park	Wellington	(New Zealand)
1996-07-20	South Africa	15	11	Lancaster Park	Christchurch	(New Zealand)
1996-07-27	Australia	32	25	Lang Park	Brisbane	(New Zealand)
1996-08-10	South Africa	29	18	Newlands	Cape Town	(New Zealand)
1996-08-17	South Africa	23	19	Kings Park Stadium	Durban	(New Zealand)
1996-08-24	South Africa	33	26	Loftus Versfeld	Pretoria	(New Zealand)
1996-08-31	South Africa	22	32	Ellis Park	Johannesburg	South Africa
1997-06-14	Fiji	71	5	North Harbour Stadium	Albany	(New Zealand)
1997-06-21	Argentina	93	8	Athletic Park	Wellington	(New Zealand)
1997-06-28	Argentina	62	10	Rugby Park	Hamilton	(New Zealand)
1997-07-05	Australia	30	13	Lancaster Park	Christchurch	(New Zealand)
1997-07-19	South Africa	35	32	Ellis Park	Johannesburg	(New Zealand)
1997-07-26	Australia	33	18	MCG	Melbourne	(New Zealand)
1997-08-09	South Africa	55	35	Eden Park	Auckland	(New Zealand)
1997-08-16	Australia	36	24	Carisbrook	Dunedin	(New Zealand)
1997-11-15	Ireland	63	15	Lansdowne Road	Dublin	(New Zealand)
1997-11-22	England	25	8	Old Trafford	Manchester	(New Zealand)
1997-11-29	Wales	42	7	Wembley Stadium	London	(New Zealand)
1997-12-06	England	26	26	Twickenham	London	Draw
1998-06-20	England	64	22	Carisbrook	Dunedin	(New Zealand)
1998-06-27	England	40	10	Eden Park	Auckland	(New Zealand)
1998-07-11	Australia	16	24	MCG	Melbourne	Australia
1998-07-25	South Africa	3	13	Athletic Park	Wellington	South Africa
1998-08-01	Australia	23	27	Lancaster Park	Christchurch	Australia
1998-08-15	South Africa	23	24	Kings Park Stadium	Durban	South Africa
1998-08-29	Australia	14	19	Sydney Football Stadium	Sydney	Australia
1999-06-18	Samoa	71	13	North Harbour Stadium	Albany	(New Zealand)
1999-06-26	France	54	7	Athletic Park	Wellington	(New Zealand)
1999-07-10	South Africa	28	0	Carisbrook	Dunedin	(New Zealand)
1999-07-24	Australia	34	15	Eden Park	Auckland	(New Zealand)
1999-08-07	South Africa	34	18	Loftus Versfeld	Pretoria	(New Zealand)
1999-08-28	Australia	7	28	Stadium Australia	Sydney	Australia
1999-10-03	Tonga	45	9	Memorial Stadium	Bristol	(New Zealand)
1999-10-09	England	30	16	Twickenham	London	(New Zealand)
1999-10-14	Italy	101	3	McAlpine Stadium	Huddersfield	(New Zealand)
1999-10-24	Scotland	30	18	Murrayfield	Edinburgh	(New Zealand)
1999-10-31	France	31	43	Twickenham	London	France
1999-11-04	South Africa	18	22	Millennium Stadium	Cardiff	South Africa

== 2000s ==
2000s record

Games played	Won	Lost	Drawn	Win percentage
122	100	21	1	81.97%

Date	Opponent	F	A	Venue	City	Winner
2000-06-16	Tonga	102	0	North Harbour Stadium	Albany	(New Zealand)
2000-06-24	Scotland	69	20	Carisbrook	Dunedin	(New Zealand)
2000-07-01	Scotland	48	14	Eden Park	Auckland	(New Zealand)
2000-07-15	Australia	39	35	Stadium Australia	Sydney	(New Zealand)
2000-07-22	South Africa	25	12	Jade Stadium	Christchurch	(New Zealand)
2000-08-05	Australia	23	24	WestpacTrust Stadium	Wellington	Australia
2000-08-19	South Africa	40	46	Ellis Park	Johannesburg	South Africa
2000-11-11	France	39	26	Stade de France	Saint-Denis	(New Zealand)
2000-11-18	France	33	42	Stade Vélodrome	Marseille	France
2000-11-25	Italy	56	19	Stadio Marassi	Genoa	(New Zealand)
2001-06-16	Samoa	50	6	North Harbour Stadium	Albany	(New Zealand)
2001-06-23	Argentina	67	19	Jade Stadium	Christchurch	(New Zealand)
2001-06-30	France	37	12	WestpacTrust Stadium	Wellington	(New Zealand)
2001-07-21	South Africa	12	3	Newlands	Cape Town	(New Zealand)
2001-08-11	Australia	15	23	Carisbrook	Dunedin	Australia
2001-08-25	South Africa	26	15	Eden Park	Auckland	(New Zealand)
2001-09-01	Australia	26	29	Stadium Australia	Sydney	Australia
2001-11-17	Ireland	40	29	Lansdowne Road	Dublin	(New Zealand)
2001-11-24	Scotland	37	6	Murrayfield	Edinburgh	(New Zealand)
2001-12-01	Argentina	24	20	El Monumental	Buenos Aires	(New Zealand)
2002-06-08	Italy	64	10	Waikato Stadium	Hamilton	(New Zealand)
2002-06-15	Ireland	15	6	Carisbrook	Dunedin	(New Zealand)
2002-06-22	Ireland	40	8	Eden Park	Auckland	(New Zealand)
2002-06-29	Fiji	68	18	WestpacTrust Stadium	Wellington	(New Zealand)
2002-07-13	Australia	12	6	Jade Stadium	Christchurch	(New Zealand)
2002-07-20	South Africa	41	20	WestpacTrust Stadium	Wellington	(New Zealand)
2002-08-03	Australia	14	16	Telstra Stadium	Sydney	Australia
2002-08-10	South Africa	30	23	Kings Park Stadium	Durban	(New Zealand)
2002-11-09	England	28	31	Twickenham	London	England
2002-11-16	France	20	20	Stade de France	Saint-Denis	Draw
2002-11-23	Wales	43	17	Millennium Stadium	Cardiff	(New Zealand)
2003-06-14	England	13	15	Westpac Stadium	Wellington	England
2003-06-21	Wales	55	3	Waikato Stadium	Hamilton	(New Zealand)
2003-06-28	France	31	23	Jade Stadium	Christchurch	(New Zealand)
2003-07-19	South Africa	52	16	Loftus Versfeld	Pretoria	(New Zealand)
2003-07-26	Australia	50	21	Telstra Stadium	Sydney	(New Zealand)
2003-08-09	South Africa	19	11	Carisbrook	Dunedin	(New Zealand)
2003-08-16	Australia	21	17	Eden Park	Auckland	(New Zealand)
2003-10-11	Italy	70	7	Docklands Stadium	Melbourne	(New Zealand)
2003-10-17	Canada	68	6	Docklands Stadium	Melbourne	(New Zealand)
2003-10-24	Tonga	91	7	Lang Park	Brisbane	(New Zealand)
2003-11-02	Wales	53	37	Stadium Australia	Sydney	(New Zealand)
2003-11-08	South Africa	29	9	Docklands Stadium	Melbourne	(New Zealand)
2003-11-15	Australia	10	22	Stadium Australia	Sydney	Australia
2003-11-20	France	40	13	Stadium Australia	Sydney	(New Zealand)
2004-06-12	England	36	3	Carisbrook	Dunedin	(New Zealand)
2004-06-19	England	36	12	Eden Park	Auckland	(New Zealand)
2004-06-26	Argentina	41	7	Waikato Stadium	Hamilton	(New Zealand)
2004-07-10	Pacific Islanders	41	26	North Harbour Stadium	Albany	(New Zealand)
2004-07-17	Australia	16	7	Westpac Stadium	Wellington	(New Zealand)
2004-07-24	South Africa	23	21	Jade Stadium	Christchurch	(New Zealand)
2004-08-07	Australia	18	23	Telstra Stadium	Sydney	Australia
2004-08-14	South Africa	26	40	Ellis Park	Johannesburg	South Africa
2004-11-13	Italy	59	10	Stadio Flaminio	Rome	(New Zealand)
2004-11-20	Wales	26	25	Millennium Stadium	Cardiff	(New Zealand)
2004-11-27	France	45	6	Stade de France	Saint-Denis	(New Zealand)
2005-06-10	Fiji	91	0	North Harbour Stadium	Albany	(New Zealand)
2005-06-25	British and Irish Lions	21	3	Jade Stadium	Christchurch	(New Zealand)
2005-07-02	British and Irish Lions	48	18	Westpac Stadium	Wellington	(New Zealand)
2005-07-09	British and Irish Lions	38	19	Eden Park	Auckland	(New Zealand)
2005-08-06	South Africa	16	22	Newlands	Cape Town	South Africa
2005-08-13	Australia	30	13	Telstra Stadium	Sydney	(New Zealand)
2005-08-27	South Africa	31	27	Carisbrook	Dunedin	(New Zealand)
2005-09-03	Australia	34	24	Eden Park	Auckland	(New Zealand)
2005-11-05	Wales	41	3	Millennium Stadium	Cardiff	(New Zealand)
2005-11-12	Ireland	45	7	Lansdowne Road	Dublin	(New Zealand)
2005-11-19	England	23	19	Twickenham	London	(New Zealand)
2005-11-26	Scotland	29	10	Murrayfield	Edinburgh	(New Zealand)
2006-06-10	Ireland	34	23	Waikato Stadium	Hamilton	(New Zealand)
2006-06-17	Ireland	27	17	Eden Park	Auckland	(New Zealand)
2006-06-24	Argentina	25	19	José Amalfitani Stadium	Buenos Aires	(New Zealand)
2006-07-08	Australia	32	12	Jade Stadium	Christchurch	(New Zealand)
2006-07-22	South Africa	35	17	Westpac Stadium	Wellington	(New Zealand)
2006-07-29	Australia	13	9	Suncorp Stadium	Brisbane	(New Zealand)
2006-08-19	Australia	34	27	Eden Park	Auckland	(New Zealand)
2006-08-26	South Africa	45	26	Loftus Versfeld	Pretoria	(New Zealand)
2006-09-02	South Africa	20	21	Royal Bafokeng Stadium	Rustenburg	South Africa
2006-11-05	England	41	20	Twickenham	London	(New Zealand)
2006-11-11	France	47	3	Stade de Gerland	Lyon	(New Zealand)
2006-11-18	France	23	11	Stade de France	Saint-Denis	(New Zealand)
2006-11-25	Wales	45	10	Millennium Stadium	Cardiff	(New Zealand)
2007-06-02	France	42	11	Eden Park	Auckland	(New Zealand)
2007-06-09	France	61	10	Westpac Stadium	Wellington	(New Zealand)
2007-06-16	Canada	64	13	Waikato Stadium	Hamilton	(New Zealand)
2007-06-23	South Africa	26	21	ABSA Stadium	Durban	(New Zealand)
2007-06-30	Australia	15	20	MCG	Melbourne	Australia
2007-07-14	South Africa	33	6	Jade Stadium	Christchurch	(New Zealand)
2007-07-21	Australia	26	12	Eden Park	Auckland	(New Zealand)
2007-09-08	Italy	76	14	Stade Vélodrome	Marseille	(New Zealand)
2007-09-15	Portugal	108	13	Stade de Gerland	Lyon	(New Zealand)
2007-09-23	Scotland	40	0	Murrayfield	Edinburgh	(New Zealand)
2007-09-29	Romania	85	8	Stadium Municipal	Toulouse	(New Zealand)
2007-10-06	France	18	20	Millennium Stadium	Cardiff	France
2008-06-07	Ireland	21	11	Westpac Stadium	Wellington	(New Zealand)
2008-06-14	England	37	20	Eden Park	Auckland	(New Zealand)
2008-06-21	England	44	12	AMI Stadium	Christchurch	(New Zealand)
2008-07-05	South Africa	19	8	Westpac Stadium	Wellington	(New Zealand)
2008-07-12	South Africa	28	30	Carisbrook	Dunedin	South Africa
2008-07-26	Australia	19	34	ANZ Stadium	Sydney	Australia
2008-08-02	Australia	39	10	Eden Park	Auckland	(New Zealand)
2008-08-16	South Africa	19	0	Newlands	Cape Town	(New Zealand)
2008-09-03	Samoa	101	14	Yarrow Stadium	New Plymouth	(New Zealand)
2008-09-13	Australia	28	24	Suncorp Stadium	Brisbane	(New Zealand)
2008-11-01	Australia	19	14	Hong Kong Stadium	Hong Kong	(New Zealand)
2008-11-08	Scotland	32	6	Murrayfield	Edinburgh	(New Zealand)
2008-11-15	Ireland	22	3	Croke Park	Dublin	(New Zealand)
2008-11-22	Wales	29	9	Millennium Stadium	Cardiff	(New Zealand)
2008-11-29	England	32	6	Twickenham	London	(New Zealand)
2009-06-13	France	22	27	Carisbrook	Dunedin	France
2009-06-20	France	14	10	Westpac Stadium	Wellington	(New Zealand)
2009-06-27	Italy	27	6	AMI Stadium	Christchurch	(New Zealand)
2009-07-18	Australia	22	16	Eden Park	Auckland	(New Zealand)
2009-07-25	South Africa	19	28	Vodacom Park	Bloemfontein	South Africa
2009-08-01	South Africa	19	31	ABSA Stadium	Durban	South Africa
2009-08-22	Australia	19	18	ANZ Stadium	Sydney	(New Zealand)
2009-09-12	South Africa	29	32	Waikato Stadium	Hamilton	South Africa
2009-09-19	Australia	33	6	Westpac Stadium	Wellington	(New Zealand)
2009-10-31	Australia	32	19	National Olympic Stadium	Tokyo	(New Zealand)
2009-11-07	Wales	19	12	Millennium Stadium	Cardiff	(New Zealand)
2009-11-14	Italy	20	6	San Siro	Milan	(New Zealand)
2009-11-21	England	19	6	Twickenham	London	(New Zealand)
2009-11-28	France	39	12	Stade Vélodrome	Marseille	(New Zealand)

== 2010s ==
2010s record

Games played	Won	Lost	Drawn	Win percentage
133	116	13	4	87.22%

Date	Opponent	F	A	Venue	City	Winner
2010-06-12	Ireland	66	28	Yarrow Stadium	New Plymouth	(New Zealand)
2010-06-19	Wales	42	9	Carisbrook	Dunedin	(New Zealand)
2010-06-26	Wales	29	10	Waikato Stadium	Hamilton	(New Zealand)
2010-07-10	South Africa	32	12	Eden Park	Auckland	(New Zealand)
2010-07-17	South Africa	31	17	Westpac Stadium	Wellington	(New Zealand)
2010-07-31	Australia	49	28	Etihad Stadium	Melbourne	(New Zealand)
2010-08-07	Australia	20	10	AMI Stadium	Christchurch	(New Zealand)
2010-08-21	South Africa	29	22	FNB Stadium	Johannesburg	(New Zealand)
2010-09-11	Australia	23	22	ANZ Stadium	Sydney	(New Zealand)
2010-10-30	Australia	24	26	Hong Kong Stadium	Hong Kong	Australia
2010-11-06	England	26	16	Twickenham	London	(New Zealand)
2010-11-13	Scotland	49	3	Murrayfield	Edinburgh	(New Zealand)
2010-11-20	Ireland	38	18	Aviva Stadium	Dublin	(New Zealand)
2010-11-27	Wales	37	25	Millennium Stadium	Cardiff	(New Zealand)
2011-07-22	Fiji	60	14	Carisbrook	Dunedin	(New Zealand)
2011-07-30	South Africa	40	7	Westpac Stadium	Wellington	(New Zealand)
2011-08-06	Australia	30	14	Eden Park	Auckland	(New Zealand)
2011-08-20	South Africa	5	18	Nelson Mandela Bay Stadium	Port Elizabeth	South Africa
2011-08-27	Australia	20	25	Suncorp Stadium	Brisbane	Australia
2011-09-09	Tonga	41	10	Eden Park	Auckland	(New Zealand)
2011-09-16	Japan	83	7	Waikato Stadium	Hamilton	(New Zealand)
2011-09-24	France	37	17	Eden Park	Auckland	(New Zealand)
2011-10-02	Canada	79	15	Wellington Regional Stadium	Wellington	(New Zealand)
2011-10-09	Argentina	33	10	Eden Park	Auckland	(New Zealand)
2011-10-16	Australia	20	6	Eden Park	Auckland	(New Zealand)
2011-10-23	France	8	7	Eden Park	Auckland	(New Zealand)
2012-06-09	Ireland	42	10	Eden Park	Auckland	(New Zealand)
2012-06-16	Ireland	22	19	AMI Stadium	Christchurch	(New Zealand)
2012-06-23	Ireland	60	0	Waikato Stadium	Hamilton	(New Zealand)
2012-08-18	Australia	27	19	ANZ Stadium	Sydney	(New Zealand)
2012-08-25	Australia	22	0	Eden Park	Auckland	(New Zealand)
2012-09-08	Argentina	21	5	Westpac Stadium	Wellington	(New Zealand)
2012-09-15	South Africa	21	11	Forsyth Barr Stadium	Dunedin	(New Zealand)
2012-09-29	Argentina	54	15	Estadio Ciudad de La Plata	La Plata	(New Zealand)
2012-10-06	South Africa	32	16	FNB Stadium	Johannesburg	(New Zealand)
2012-10-20	Australia	18	18	Suncorp Stadium	Brisbane	Draw
2012-11-11	Scotland	51	22	Murrayfield	Edinburgh	(New Zealand)
2012-11-17	Italy	42	10	Stadio Olimpico	Rome	(New Zealand)
2012-11-24	Wales	33	10	Millennium Stadium	Cardiff	(New Zealand)
2012-12-01	England	21	38	Twickenham Stadium	London	England
2013-06-08	France	23	13	Eden Park	Auckland	(New Zealand)
2013-06-15	France	30	0	AMI Stadium	Christchurch	(New Zealand)
2013-06-22	France	24	9	Yarrow Stadium	New Plymouth	(New Zealand)
2013-08-17	Australia	47	29	ANZ Stadium	Sydney	(New Zealand)
2013-08-24	Australia	27	16	Westpac Stadium	Wellington	(New Zealand)
2013-09-07	Argentina	28	13	Waikato Stadium	Hamilton	(New Zealand)
2013-09-14	South Africa	29	15	Eden Park	Auckland	(New Zealand)
2013-09-28	Argentina	33	15	Estadio Ciudad de La Plata	La Plata	(New Zealand)
2013-10-05	South Africa	38	27	Ellis Park	Johannesburg	(New Zealand)
2013-10-19	Australia	41	33	Forsyth Barr Stadium	Dunedin	(New Zealand)
2013-11-02	Japan	54	6	Chichibunomiya Rugby Stadium	Tokyo	(New Zealand)
2013-11-09	France	26	19	Stade de France	Saint-Denis	(New Zealand)
2013-11-16	England	30	22	Twickenham	London	(New Zealand)
2013-11-24	Ireland	24	22	Aviva Stadium	Dublin	(New Zealand)
2014-06-07	England	20	15	Eden Park	Auckland	(New Zealand)
2014-06-14	England	28	27	Forsyth Barr Stadium	Dunedin	(New Zealand)
2014-06-21	England	36	13	Waikato Stadium	Hamilton	(New Zealand)
2014-08-16	Australia	12	12	ANZ Stadium	Sydney	Draw
2014-08-23	Australia	51	20	Eden Park	Auckland	(New Zealand)
2014-09-06	Argentina	28	9	McLean Park	Napier	(New Zealand)
2014-09-13	South Africa	14	10	Westpac Stadium	Wellington	(New Zealand)
2014-09-27	Argentina	34	13	Estadio Ciudad de La Plata	La Plata	(New Zealand)
2014-10-04	South Africa	25	27	Ellis Park	Johannesburg	South Africa
2014-10-18	Australia	29	28	Suncorp Stadium	Brisbane	(New Zealand)
2014-11-01	United States	74	6	Soldier Field	Chicago	(New Zealand)
2014-11-08	England	24	21	Twickenham	London	(New Zealand)
2014-11-15	Scotland	24	16	Murrayfield	Edinburgh	(New Zealand)
2014-11-22	Wales	34	16	Millennium Stadium	Cardiff	(New Zealand)
2015-07-08	Samoa	25	16	Apia Park	Apia	(New Zealand)
2015-07-17	Argentina	39	18	AMI Stadium	Christchurch	(New Zealand)
2015-07-25	South Africa	27	20	Ellis Park	Johannesburg	(New Zealand)
2015-08-08	Australia	19	27	ANZ Stadium	Sydney	Australia
2015-08-15	Australia	41	13	Eden Park	Auckland	(New Zealand)
2015-09-20	Argentina	26	16	Wembley Stadium	London	(New Zealand)
2015-09-24	Namibia	58	14	Olympic Stadium	London	(New Zealand)
2015-10-02	Georgia	43	10	Millennium Stadium	Cardiff	(New Zealand)
2015-10-09	Tonga	47	9	St James' Park	Newcastle	(New Zealand)
2015-10-17	France	62	13	Millennium Stadium	Cardiff	(New Zealand)
2015-10-24	South Africa	20	18	Twickenham	London	(New Zealand)
2015-10-31	Australia	34	17	Twickenham	London	(New Zealand)
2016-06-11	Wales	39	21	Eden Park	Auckland	(New Zealand)
2016-06-18	Wales	36	22	Westpac Stadium	Wellington	(New Zealand)
2016-06-25	Wales	46	6	Forsyth Barr Stadium	Dunedin	(New Zealand)
2016-08-20	Australia	42	8	ANZ Stadium	Sydney	(New Zealand)
2016-08-27	Australia	29	9	Westpac Stadium	Wellington	(New Zealand)
2016-09-10	Argentina	57	22	Waikato Stadium	Hamilton	(New Zealand)
2016-09-17	South Africa	41	13	AMI Stadium	Christchurch	(New Zealand)
2016-10-01	Argentina	36	17	José Amalfitani Stadium	Buenos Aires	(New Zealand)
2016-10-08	South Africa	57	15	Kings Park Stadium	Durban	(New Zealand)
2016-10-22	Australia	37	10	Eden Park	Auckland	(New Zealand)
2016-11-05	Ireland	29	40	Soldier Field	Chicago	Ireland
2016-11-12	Italy	68	10	Stadio Olimpico	Rome	(New Zealand)
2016-11-19	Ireland	21	9	Aviva Stadium	Dublin	(New Zealand)
2016-11-26	France	24	19	Stade de France	Saint-Denis	(New Zealand)
2017-06-16	Samoa	78	0	Eden Park	Auckland	(New Zealand)
2017-06-24	British and Irish Lions	30	15	Eden Park	Auckland	(New Zealand)
2017-07-01	British and Irish Lions	21	24	Westpac Stadium	Wellington	Lions
2017-07-08	British and Irish Lions	15	15	Eden Park	Auckland	Draw
2017-08-19	Australia	54	34	ANZ Stadium	Sydney	(New Zealand)
2017-08-26	Australia	35	29	Forsyth Barr Stadium	Dunedin	(New Zealand)
2017-09-09	Argentina	39	22	Yarrow Stadium	New Plymouth	(New Zealand)
2017-09-16	South Africa	57	0	North Harbour Stadium	Albany	(New Zealand)
2017-09-30	Argentina	36	10	José Amalfitani Stadium	Buenos Aires	(New Zealand)
2017-10-07	South Africa	25	24	Newlands	Cape Town	(New Zealand)
2017-10-21	Australia	18	23	Suncorp Stadium	Brisbane	Australia
2017-11-11	France	38	18	Stade de France	Saint-Denis	(New Zealand)
2017-11-18	Scotland	22	17	Murrayfield	Edinburgh	(New Zealand)
2017-11-25	Wales	33	18	Millennium Stadium	Cardiff	(New Zealand)
2018-06-09	France	52	11	Eden Park	Auckland	(New Zealand)
2018-06-16	France	26	13	Westpac Stadium	Wellington	(New Zealand)
2018-06-23	France	49	14	Forsyth Barr Stadium	Dunedin	(New Zealand)
2018-08-18	Australia	38	13	ANZ Stadium	Sydney	(New Zealand)
2018-08-25	Australia	40	12	Eden Park	Auckland	(New Zealand)
2018-09-08	Argentina	46	24	Trafalgar Park	Nelson	(New Zealand)
2018-09-15	South Africa	34	36	Westpac Stadium	Wellington	South Africa
2018-09-29	Argentina	35	17	José Amalfitani Stadium	Buenos Aires	(New Zealand)
2018-10-06	South Africa	32	30	Loftus Versfeld	Pretoria	(New Zealand)
2018-10-27	Australia	37	20	Yokohama International Stadium	Yokohama	(New Zealand)
2018-11-03	Japan	69	31	Ajinomoto Stadium	Tokyo	(New Zealand)
2018-11-10	England	16	15	Twickenham	London	(New Zealand)
2018-11-17	Ireland	9	16	Aviva Stadium	Dublin	Ireland
2018-11-24	Italy	66	3	Stadio Olimpico	Rome	(New Zealand)
2019-07-20	Argentina	20	16	José Amalfitani Stadium	Buenos Aires	(New Zealand)
2019-07-27	South Africa	16	16	Westpac Stadium	Wellington	Draw
2019-08-10	Australia	26	47	Optus Stadium	Perth	Australia
2019-08-17	Australia	36	0	Eden Park	Auckland	(New Zealand)
2019-09-07	Tonga	92	7	Waikato Stadium	Hamilton	(New Zealand)
2019-09-21	South Africa	23	13	Yokohama International Stadium	Yokohama	(New Zealand)
2019-10-02	Canada	63	0	Oita Stadium	Oita	(New Zealand)
2019-10-06	Namibia	71	9	Tokyo Stadium	Tokyo	(New Zealand)
2019-10-19	Ireland	46	14	Tokyo Stadium	Tokyo	(New Zealand)
2019-10-26	England	7	19	Yokohama International Stadium	Yokohama	England
2019-11-01	Wales	40	17	Tokyo Stadium	Tokyo	(New Zealand)

== 2020s ==
2020s record

Games played	Won	Lost	Drawn	Win percentage
83	58	23	2	69.88%

Date	Opponent	F	A	Venue	City	Winner
2020-10-11	Australia	16	16	Sky Stadium	Wellington	Draw
2020-10-18	Australia	27	7	Eden Park	Auckland	(New Zealand)
2020-10-31	Australia	43	5	ANZ Stadium	Sydney	(New Zealand)
2020-11-07	Australia	22	24	Suncorp Stadium	Brisbane	Australia
2020-11-14	Argentina	15	25	Bankwest Stadium	Sydney	Argentina
2020-11-28	Argentina	38	0	McDonald Jones Stadium	Newcastle	(New Zealand)
2021-07-03	Tonga	102	0	Mount Smart Stadium	Auckland	(New Zealand)
2021-07-10	Fiji	57	23	Forsyth Barr Stadium	Dunedin	(New Zealand)
2021-07-17	Fiji	60	13	Waikato Stadium	Hamilton	(New Zealand)
2021-08-07	Australia	33	25	Eden Park	Auckland	(New Zealand)
2021-08-14	Australia	57	22	Eden Park	Auckland	(New Zealand)
2021-09-05	Australia	38	21	Optus Stadium	Perth	(New Zealand)
2021-09-12	Argentina	39	0	Robina Stadium	Gold Coast	(New Zealand)
2021-09-18	Argentina	36	13	Suncorp Stadium	Brisbane	(New Zealand)
2021-09-25	South Africa	19	17	Queensland Country Bank Stadium	Townsville	(New Zealand)
2021-10-02	South Africa	29	31	Robina Stadium	Gold Coast	South Africa
2021-10-23	United States	104	14	FedExField	Washington	(New Zealand)
2021-10-30	Wales	54	16	Millennium Stadium	Cardiff	(New Zealand)
2021-11-06	Italy	47	9	Stadio Olimpico	Rome	(New Zealand)
2021-11-13	Ireland	20	29	Aviva Stadium	Dublin	Ireland
2021-11-20	France	25	40	Stade De France	Paris	France
2022-07-02	Ireland	42	19	Eden Park	Auckland	(New Zealand)
2022-07-09	Ireland	12	23	Forsyth Barr Stadium	Dunedin	Ireland
2022-07-16	Ireland	22	32	Sky Stadium	Wellington	Ireland
2022-08-06	South Africa	10	26	Mbombela Stadium	Nelspruit	South Africa
2022-08-13	South Africa	35	23	Ellis Park	Johannesburg	(New Zealand)
2022-08-27	Argentina	18	25	Rugby League Park	Christchurch	Argentina
2022-09-03	Argentina	53	3	Waikato Stadium	Hamilton	(New Zealand)
2022-09-15	Australia	39	37	Marvel Stadium	Melbourne	(New Zealand)
2022-09-24	Australia	40	14	Eden Park	Auckland	(New Zealand)
2022-10-29	Japan	38	31	National Stadium	Tokyo	(New Zealand)
2022-11-05	Wales	55	23	Millennium Stadium	Cardiff	(New Zealand)
2022-11-13	Scotland	31	23	Murrayfield	Edinburgh	(New Zealand)
2022-11-19	England	25	25	Twickenham	London	Draw
2023-07-08	Argentina	41	12	Estadio Malvinas Argentinas	Mendoza	(New Zealand)
2023-07-15	South Africa	35	20	Go Media Stadium Mt Smart	Auckland	(New Zealand)
2023-07-29	Australia	38	7	Melbourne Cricket Ground	Melbourne	(New Zealand)
2023-08-05	Australia	23	20	Forsyth Barr Stadium	Dunedin	(New Zealand)
2023-08-25	South Africa	7	35	Twickenham	London	South Africa
2023-09-08	France	13	27	Stade De France	Paris	France
2023-09-15	Namibia	71	3	Stadium De Toulouse	Toulouse	(New Zealand)
2023-09-29	Italy	96	17	OL Stadium	Lyon	(New Zealand)
2023-10-05	Uruguay	73	0	OL Stadium	Lyon	(New Zealand)
2023-10-14	Ireland	28	24	Stade De France	Paris	(New Zealand)
2023-10-20	Argentina	44	6	Stade De France	Paris	(New Zealand)
2023-10-28	South Africa	11	12	Stade De France	Paris	South Africa
2024-07-06	England	16	15	Forsyth Barr Stadium	Dunedin	(New Zealand)
2024-07-13	England	24	17	Eden Park	Auckland	(New Zealand)
2024-07-19	Fiji	47	5	Snapdragon Stadium	San Diego	(New Zealand)
2024-08-10	Argentina	30	38	Sky Stadium	Wellington	Argentina
2024-08-17	Argentina	42	10	Eden Park	Auckland	(New Zealand)
2024-08-31	South Africa	27	31	Ellis Park	Johannesburg	South Africa
2024-09-07	South Africa	12	18	Cape Town Stadium	Cape Town	South Africa
2024-09-21	Australia	31	28	Accor Stadium	Sydney	(New Zealand)
2024-09-28	Australia	33	13	Sky Stadium	Wellington	(New Zealand)
2024-10-26	Japan	64	19	Nissan Stadium	Yokohama	(New Zealand)
2024-11-02	England	24	22	Twickenham	London	(New Zealand)
2024-11-08	Ireland	23	13	Aviva Stadium	Dublin	(New Zealand)
2024-11-16	France	29	30	Stade De France	Paris	France
2024-11-23	Italy	29	11	Allianz Stadium	Turin	(New Zealand)
2025-07-05	France	31	27	Forsyth Barr Stadium	Dunedin	(New Zealand)
2025-07-12	France	43	17	Sky Stadium	Wellington	(New Zealand)
2025-07-19	France	29	19	Waikato Stadium	Hamilton	(New Zealand)
2025-08-16	Argentina	41	24	Estadio Mario Alberto Kempes	Còrdoba	(New Zealand)
2025-08-23	Argentina	23	29	Estadio Vélez Sarsfield	Buenos Aires	Argentina
2025-09-06	South Africa	24	17	Eden Park	Auckland	(New Zealand)
2025-09-13	South Africa	10	43	Sky Stadium	Wellington	South Africa
2025-09-27	Australia	33	24	Eden Park	Auckland	(New Zealand)
2025-10-04	Australia	28	14	Perth Stadium	Perth	(New Zealand)
2025-11-01	Ireland	26	13	Soldier Field	Chicago	(New Zealand)
2025-11-08	Scotland	25	17	Murrayfield	Edinburgh	(New Zealand)
2025-11-15	England	19	33	Twickenham	London	England
2025-11-22	Wales	52	26	Millennium Stadium	Cardiff	(New Zealand)
2026-07-04	France	34	32	Te Kaha	Christchurch	(New Zealand)
2026-07-11	Italy	47	17	Hnry Stadium	Wellington	(New Zealand)
2026-07-18	Ireland	40	21	Eden Park	Auckland	(New Zealand)
2026-08-22	South Africa	33	16	Ellis Park	Johannesburg	(New Zealand)
2026-08-29	South Africa	26	33	Cape Town Stadium	Cape Town	South Africa
2026-09-05	South Africa	24	29	FNB Stadium	Johannesburg	South Africa
2026-09-12	South Africa	28	43	M&T Bank Stadium	Baltimore	South Africa
2026-10-10	Australia	50	19	Eden Park	Auckland	(New Zealand)
2026-10-17	Australia	43	21	Stadium Australia	Sydney	(New Zealand)
2026-11-07	Scotland	43	21	Murrayfield	Edinburgh	(New Zealand)
2026-11-14	Wales	28	35	Millennium Stadium	Cardiff	Wales
2026-11-21	England	12	37	Twickenham	London	England
