= I Guess That's Why They Call It the Blues =

1983 song by Elton John

Single by Elton John

from the album Too Low for Zero
- B-side: "Choc-Ice Goes Mental" (UK); "The Retreat" (US)
- Released: April 1983 (UK); November 1983 (US)
- Recorded: September 1982
- Genre: Soft rock; doo-wop
- Length: 4:45
- Label: Rocket; Geffen (US)
- Songwriters: Elton John, Bernie Taupin, Davey Johnstone
- Producer: Chris Thomas

Elton John singles chronology
"All Quiet on the Western Front" (1982)	"I Guess That's Why They Call It the Blues" (1983)	"I'm Still Standing" (1983)

Music video
- "I Guess That's Why They Call It the Blues" on YouTube

"I Guess That's Why They Call It the Blues" is a song by British musician Elton John, with music by John and Davey Johnstone and lyrics by Bernie Taupin, released as the first single from John's 17th studio album Too Low for Zero. It was the first single since 1975's "Someone Saved My Life Tonight" to feature the classic lineup of the Elton John Band.

The song became one of John's biggest hits of the 1980s in the United States, holding at No. 2 for four weeks on the Adult Contemporary chart, and reaching No. 4 on the Billboard Hot 100. It also reached the top ten in five countries, including the UK, peaking at number five.

== Critical reception ==
The song received largely favourable reviews, with Bill Janovitz of AllMusic declaring the song "likely to stand the test of time as a standard."

Janovitz wrote: "As with the lyric, the music has more than a tinge of nostalgia, with a '50s-like R&B shuffle, a jazzy piano theme, and an inspired, Toots Thielemans-like harmonica solo from Stevie Wonder. The soaring solo takes the song to new heights, the ache of the sentiment palpable in every note." Future Pet Shop Boys frontman Neil Tennant, then working for Smash Hits, wrote: "An old fashioned, predictable weepie which is I guess why they called in Stevie Wonder to liven it up with his harmonica. I think Elton John ought to luck up to his ideas: this isn't very inspired and I bet he knows it."

== Live performances and covers ==
A fan favourite, John has performed the song live numerous times, occasionally playing it as part of a medley with his hit "Blue Eyes" (from the 1982 album Jump Up!).

The song was later performed live by John and Mary J. Blige, and this version of the song was part of the Mary J. Blige & Friends EP. A live version of the song with Mary J. Blige also appeared on John's One Night Only – The Greatest Hits live compilation, recorded in Madison Square Garden in October 2000. Another live version, this one featuring just Elton John and basic rhythm section, was recorded live in Verona in 1996 during John's appearance with Luciano Pavarotti as part of the master tenor's Pavarotti and Friends for War Child benefit concerts.

The song was covered by James Blunt and released in the UK on the compilation album BBC Radio 2: Sounds of the 80s on 7 November 2014.

Canadian singer Alessia Cara covered the song for the 2018 tribute album Revamp & Restoration.

== Music video ==
The original music video, one of twenty directed for John by Australian Russell Mulcahy, tells the story of two 1950s-era young lovers who are separated when the man is forced to leave for National Service, depicting the trials and tribulations he experiences there, and then are finally reunited at the end of the song. It was filmed in the Rivoli Ballroom in Crofton Park in London and at Colchester Garrison Barracks, Essex.

== Track listings ==
US 7-inch single

1. "I Guess That's Why They Call It the Blues"
2. "The Retreat"

UK 7-inch single

1. "I Guess That's Why They Call It the Blues"
2. "Choc Ice Goes Mental"

== Personnel ==
- Elton John – vocals, acoustic piano, keyboards
- Davey Johnstone – electric guitar, acoustic guitar, backing vocals
- Dee Murray – bass, backing vocals
- Nigel Olsson – drums, backing vocals
- Stevie Wonder – harmonica

== Charts ==
=== Weekly charts ===
Chart (1983–1984)	Peak position
Australia (Kent Music Report)	4
Canadian Adult Contemporary	1
Canadian Top Singles	9
Germany (Media Control AG)	22
Luxembourg (Radio Luxembourg)	3
Netherlands (Single Top 100)	48
New Zealand (Recorded Music NZ)	12
South Africa (RISA)	4
Switzerland (Schweizer Hitparade)	12
UK Singles (Official Charts)	5
US Billboard Hot 100	4
US Billboard Adult Contemporary	2
US Mainstream Rock (Billboard)	22
Zimbabwe Singles (ZIMA)	1

=== Year-end charts ===
Year-end chart (1983)	Position
Australia (Kent Music Report)	38
Year-end chart (1984)	Position
Brazil (Crowley)	36
US Top Pop Singles (Billboard)	33

== Certifications ==
Region	Certification	Certified units/sales
New Zealand (RMNZ)	3× Platinum	90,000^{‡}
United Kingdom (BPI)	Platinum	600,000^{‡}
United States (RIAA)	Platinum	1,000,000^{‡}
^{‡} Sales+streaming figures based on certification alone.
