= Empty Garden (Hey Hey Johnny) =

Single by Elton John

from the album Jump Up!
- B-side: "Take Me Down to the Ocean"
- Released: 28 May 1982 (UK)
- Recorded: September–October 1981
- Genre: Rock
- Length: 4:06 (single version); 5:05 (album version)
- Label: Geffen (US); Rocket (UK)
- Songwriters: Elton John, Bernie Taupin
- Producer: Chris Thomas

Elton John singles chronology
"Blue Eyes" (1982)	"Empty Garden (Hey Hey Johnny)" (1982)	"Princess" (1982)

"Empty Garden (Hey Hey Johnny)" is a song by British musician Elton John and lyricist Bernie Taupin, which first appeared on his sixteenth album Jump Up! released in 1982. It was the album's second single in the UK, and the lead single in the United States. The song is a tribute to John Lennon, who had been murdered 15 months earlier. In the U.S., "Empty Garden" reached number 13 on the Billboard Hot 100 record chart. It peaked at number 51 in the UK singles chart.

== Composition and background ==
Lennon and John were good friends, and in 1974, Lennon appeared on John's cover version of "Lucy in the Sky with Diamonds", the B-side of which was Lennon's "One Day (At a Time)". The pair later collaborated on "Whatever Gets You thru the Night", which appeared on Lennon's album Walls and Bridges. Lennon agreed to appear in concert with John if "Whatever Gets You thru the Night" became a No. 1 single, which it did. On Thanksgiving Day, 1974, Lennon and John performed it, along with "Lucy in the Sky with Diamonds" and "I Saw Her Standing There" at Madison Square Garden.

The song title "Empty Garden" refers to the empty venue. It uses a garden metaphor to represent Lennon's efforts, achievements, and absence. The lyrics describe the gardener as having "weeded out the tears and grew a good crop." The refrain "Can't you come out to play?" references Lennon's composition "Dear Prudence" (credited to "Lennon/McCartney") from the album The Beatles, colloquially known as The White Album.

After Lennon's death, John was concerned that a tribute song to the late Beatle would be "clumsy" – until he saw Taupin's lyrics.

John wrote and recorded an earlier instrumental tribute to Lennon, "The Man Who Never Died", which was issued as the B-side of "Nikita" in 1985 and eventually included as a bonus track on the remastered reissue of Ice on Fire.

== Music video ==
The music video features John playing his piano and singing the track in front of a replica of Lennon's Manhattan apartment, where he was murdered. Dead leaves are seen blowing around the pavement.

== Reception ==
Billboard said that it came closer to matching John's best work than any of his recent songs. Record World said that it's a "simple, touching tribute to John Lennon" and that "it features one of Elton's strongest vocal efforts in recent memory."

John has rarely performed the song live since the 1982 world tour because it brings back many painful memories of Lennon's murder, as he once stated during a concert on 5 November 1999, at the Kohl Center in Madison, Wisconsin, and prior to that at a concert on 9 October 1988 at The Centrum in Worcester, Massachusetts. In the latter case, John played the song, as well as "Lucy in the Sky with Diamonds", in his third encore to mark what would have been Lennon's 48th birthday.

John's notable performances of the song include one at Madison Square Garden, with John's godson Sean and Lennon's widow Yoko in the audience in 1982. He also performed the song during his first appearance on the 17 April 1982 episode of Saturday Night Live hosted by Johnny Cash.

In April 2013, John added the song to the setlist of The Million Dollar Piano, his residency show at The Colosseum at Caesars Palace.

== Personnel ==
- Elton John – Yamaha CP-70 electric grand piano, harpsichord, vocals
- James Newton Howard – synthesizers
- Richie Zito – acoustic guitars
- Dee Murray – bass
- Jeff Porcaro – drums, LinnDrum

Three percussion instruments – namely castanets, maracas and tambourine – are audible, possibly overdubs from Jeff Porcaro or perhaps an uncredited percussionist.

== Chart performance ==
=== Weekly charts ===
Chart (1982)	Peak position
Canada RPM Adult Contemporary	8
Canada RPM Top Singles	8
Ireland (IRMA)	29
New Zealand (Recorded Music NZ)	14
UK Singles Chart	51
US Billboard Hot 100	13
US Adult Contemporary (Billboard)	18
US Cash Box Top 100	12

=== Year-end charts ===
Chart (1982)	Rank
Brazil (Crowley)	39
Canada	68
U.S. Billboard Hot 100	76
U.S. Cash Box	78

== Certifications ==
Certifications for "Empty Garden"
Region	Certification	Certified units/sales
New Zealand (RMNZ)	Gold	15,000^{‡}
^{‡} Sales+streaming figures based on certification alone.
