= Jump Up! (Elton John album) =

Studio album by Elton John
- Released: 9 April 1982
- Recorded: September–October 1981
- Studios: AIR, Salem, Montserrat; Pathé Marconi, Paris
- Genre: Pop rock
- Length: 42:31
- Labels: Geffen (US), Rocket (UK)
- Producer: Chris Thomas

Elton John chronology
The Fox (1981)	Jump Up! (1982)	Too Low for Zero (1983)

Singles from Jump Up!
- 1. "Blue Eyes" Released: March 1982; 2. "Empty Garden (Hey Hey Johnny)" Released: May 1982; 3. "Princess" Released: 1982; 4. "Ball and Chain" Released: September 1982; 5. "All Quiet on the Western Front" Released: November 1982

Professional ratings
Review scores
Source	Rating
AllMusic	3/5 stars
The Encyclopedia of Popular Music	2/5 stars
Robert Christgau	B
Rolling Stone	4/5 stars
Smash Hits	7.5/10

Jump Up! is the sixteenth studio album by British musician Elton John. It was released in 1982 by The Rocket Record Company except in the US and Canada, where it was released by Geffen Records. In the United States, the album was certified gold by the RIAA in November 1982.

== Background ==
The album includes "Empty Garden (Hey Hey Johnny)", a tribute to John Lennon (who had also signed to Geffen for the release of Double Fantasy, which is now owned by EMI). This is one of the first few LPs that showcases Elton John singing in a deeper voice, as can be heard in songs such as "Blue Eyes", "Princess", "Ball and Chain" and "Spiteful Child". "Legal Boys" was written by John and Tim Rice, who later wrote lyrics for The Lion King and The Road to El Dorado. This is the last studio album in which James Newton Howard played keyboards (although he would play keyboards with John again on the soundtrack of Gnomeo & Juliet almost 30 years later).

The album's inner sleeve artwork shows John's lifelong friend Vance Buck and Gary Osborne's then 5-year-old son Luke. It was recorded and mixed digitally at AIR Studios in Montserrat, and Pathé Marconi Studios in France.

In a 2010 Sirius radio special, John's lyricist, Bernie Taupin, talking about Jump Up!, said it was "one of our worst albums". He added, "It's a terrible, awful, disposable album, but it had 'Empty Garden' on it, so it's worth it for that one song."

John played several songs from the album on the Jump Up! Tour, including "Ball and Chain," "Dear John, "Where Have All the Good Times Gone," "Empty Garden" and "Blue Eyes." He added "Blue Eyes" to the tour set lists for the 1984 Breaking Hearts and European Express tours, and played "Blue Eyes" and "Empty Garden" during his 1999 solo piano tour sets.

== Track listing ==
Side one
No.	Title	Writer(s)	Length
1.	"Dear John"	Elton John; Gary Osborne	3:31
2.	"Spiteful Child"	John; Bernie Taupin	4:15
3.	"Ball & Chain"	John; Osborne	3:27
4.	"Legal Boys"	John; Tim Rice	3:05
5.	"I Am Your Robot"	John; Taupin	4:43
6.	"Blue Eyes"	John; Osborne	3:25
Total length:			22:26

Side two
No.	Title	Writer(s)	Length
1.	"Empty Garden (Hey Hey Johnny)"	John; Taupin	5:09
2.	"Princess"	John; Osborne	4:56
3.	"Where Have All the Good Times Gone?"	John; Taupin	4:00
4.	"All Quiet on the Western Front"	John; Taupin	6:03
Total length:			20:08

== Outtakes ==
Two B-sides from the album include "Take Me Down to the Ocean" (issued as the B-side of "Empty Garden") and "Hey Papa Legba" (the B-side of "Blue Eyes"). Other outtakes from Jump Up! include "At This Time in My Life", "Desperation Train", "I'm Not Very Well", "Jerry's Law", "Moral Majority", "Waking Up in Europe" and "The Ace of Hearts and the Jack of Spades". They all have yet to see circulation, either on bootlegs or officially.

However, "Desperation Train" was later recorded and released by John's lyricist Bernie Taupin on his 1987 album, Tribe, with a new melody written by Martin Page.

== Personnel ==
=== Musicians ===
- Elton John – lead vocals, backing vocals, acoustic piano, electric grand piano, harpsichord on "Empty Garden"
- James Newton Howard – Fender Rhodes, synthesizers, brass and string arrangements, conductor
- Richie Zito – guitars
- Pete Townshend – acoustic guitar on "Ball and Chain"
- Dee Murray – bass, backing vocals
- Jeff Porcaro – drums, percussion
- Steve Holley – tambourine on "Ball and Chain", synth drum on "I Am Your Robot"
- Martyn Ford (billed in the credits as "Mountain Fjord") – brass and orchestra
- Gavyn Wright – concertmaster
- Gary Osborne – backing vocals

=== Production ===
- Chris Thomas – producer
- Bill Price – recording
- Nigel Barker – recording assistant
- Mike Stavrou – recording assistant
- Greg Fulginiti – mastering at Artisan Sound Recorders (Hollywood, California, USA)
- David Costa – design
- David Nutter – outer sleeve photography, inner sleeve photography
- Martyn Goddard – inner sleeve photography
- John Reid – management

== Charts ==
=== Weekly charts ===
Weekly chart performance for Jump Up!
Chart (1982)	Peak position
Australian Albums (Kent Music Report)	3
Canada Top Albums/CDs (RPM)	19
Dutch Albums (Album Top 100)	26
German Albums (Offizielle Top 100)	47
New Zealand Albums (RMNZ)	1
Norwegian Albums (VG-lista)	3
Swedish Albums (Sverigetopplistan)	15
UK Albums (Official Charts)	13
US Billboard 200	17

=== Year-end charts ===
Year-end chart performance for Jump Up!
Chart (1982)	Position
Australian Albums (Kent Music Report)	25
Canada Top Albums/CDs (RPM)	88
New Zealand Albums (RMNZ)	17
US Billboard 200	61

== Certifications ==
Region	Certification	Certified units/sales
Australia (ARIA)	Platinum	50,000^{^}
New Zealand (RMNZ)	Platinum	15,000^{^}
United Kingdom (BPI)	Silver	60,000^{^}
United States (RIAA)	Gold	500,000^{^}
^{^} Shipments figures based on certification alone.
