= Gary Bernstein =

American photographer and author

- Born: Washington DC
- Education: Penn State University
- Spouse: Lena Harris
- Website: Official website

Gary Bernstein is an American photographer and author.

== Early life and career ==
Bernstein was born in Washington DC, and graduated from Penn State University with a degree in Architecture. In the 1970s, Bernstein served as an editorial photographer for Harper's Bazaar and Esquire Magazine. Bernstein also received honorary degrees from the Brooks Institute and the Smithsonian Institution.

== Photography ==
Bernstein has operated studios in New York City, Los Angeles, and Chicago. In 1982, he became one of only forty members in the Cameracraftsmen of America organization and was named a Master of Contemporary Photography by the Smithsonian Institution in the early 1980s. In 1984, Bernstein's book Pro Techniques of People Photography was reviewed by Alex Thien of The Milwaukee Sentinel, who wrote of his instruction technique. In 1985, Maria C. Phillips published a broad overview of Bernstein's career.

Bernstein's fashion and commercial photographs have appeared in Vogue, Harper's Bazaar, Esquire, Gentleman's Quarterly, and Playboy. His Commercial clients included, "Revlon, Fabergé, Avon, Max Factor, Pirelli, Hart, Schaffner and Marx, Jean Paul Germain, Virgin Island Rum, and Pierre Cardin." During his career, Bernstein has clicked photographs for celebrities including, "Kenny Rogers, Victoria Principal, Johnny Carson, Farrah Fawcett, Linda Gray, Valerie Perrine, Larry Hagman, Lee Majors, Dyan Carron, Ali MacGraw, Björn Borg, Reggie Jackson, and Natalie Wood." He had also photographed Cybill Shepherd, Linda Evans, Paul Newman, and Joan Collins.

However, he is perhaps best known for his photographs of Elizabeth Taylor, used frequently for commercial use. He also supported AIDS charities alongside Taylor in the late 1980s. In 1988, a photograph of Taylor taken by Bernstein was featured on the cover of Orange Coast and that same year photographs of Taylor taken by Bernstein for Taylor's perfume line were used in a national advertising campaign. He also took a photograph of Taylor that was featured on the cover of People Magazine in 1990. Zoom Magazine described Bernstein as Taylor's "favorite photographer". He was introduced to Taylor by Robert Wagner, and Taylor became one of Bernstein's first celebrity clients. In 1989, Woman's Own labeled Bernstein the most sought-after celebrity photographer in the world, and reporting that he earned more than $1 million per year in fees and royalties. That year he also photographed Maureen Reagan for the cover of her memoir First Father, First Daughter. His photographs has been on the covers of books by Jay Leno, Danielle Steel, Kathie Lee Gifford, and Wilhelmina Cooper.

== Later career ==
Bernstein continued to take celebrity photographs and photographs for international ad campaigns. In 1994, Bernstein also took the photo for the cover of Joan Collins' memoir My Secrets. In 1997, he produced a CD-rom entitled Secrets of Professional Photography, a how-to instructional program on photography using celebrity pictures as a guide. In the early 2000s, Bernstein co-created the website Zuga.net with Monte Zucker, a co-author of Bernstein's second book Four Photographers to attract young people into the photography profession and teach them photographic techniques.

Bernstein also provides public and academic lectures on the subject of photography. In December 2013, he presented a lecture entitled "A Light on Life: The Art of Photography" at Palmer Museum of Art for the Penn State School of Visual Arts. His recent clients have included Revlon, American Express, Cartier, and Ford. On May 15, 2014, an exhibition of Bernstein's celebrity photography was put on sale at the Grumman Gallery in New York City. He has also produced network programming and is the Content Producer for The American Health Journal and other shows on PBS, and as of 2015 has half a million books in print. His work has been sold to private collections, and also installed in the Museum of Modern Art.

== Books ==
- Bernstein, Gary (1978). Burning Cold. Harmony Books. ISBN 9780517533574.
- Four Photographers, (Trinity Publishing, 1983)
- Pro Techniques of People Photography, (HP Books, 1984)
- Bernstein, Gary (1985). Pro Techniques of Beauty & Glamour Photography. HP Books. ISBN 9780895863645. "Gary Bernstein Pro Techniques of Beauty ."
- Ten Secrets for Taking Dynamic Photographs, (HP Books, 1988) with foreword by Johnny Carson
- Bernstein, Gary (1994-09-01). Portrait Hollywood: Gary Bernstein's classic celebrity photographs. Woodford Press. ISBN 9780942627022.
- The Glamorous World of People Photography, (Marathon Pr Inc, 1997) with foreword by Jay Leno

== Personal life ==
Bernstein married Ford model Kay Sutton York. She collaborated on Bernstein's first book Burning Cold with Bernie Taupin.
