= Taupin =

Studio album by Bernie Taupin
- Released: 1971
- Genre: Spoken word
- Label: DJM / Elektra (U.S.)
- Producer: Gus Dudgeon

Bernie Taupin chronology
Taupin (1971)	He Who Rides the Tiger (1980)

Professional ratings
Review scores
Source	Rating
AllMusic	link
Christgau's Record Guide	E

Taupin (released eponymously in the U.S.) is the debut studio album by longtime Elton John lyricist Bernie Taupin. It is a spoken word album of his poetry with music that revolves around the theme. The album was produced by Gus Dudgeon and coordinated by Steve Brown.

== Track listing ==
All songs written by Bernie Taupin, Caleb Quaye, and Davey Johnstone, except where noted.

Side one

1. "Child"
  - "Birth" – 1:20
  - "The Greatest Discovery" (Elton John, Taupin) – 2:47
  - "Flatters (a beginning)" – 1:16
  - "Brothers Together" – 1:45
  - "Rowston Manor" – 2:20
  - "End of a Day" – 2:00
  - "To a Grandfather" (Taupin, Quaye, Johnstone, Shawn Phillips) – 1:42
  - "Solitude" – 1:43
  - "Conclusion" – 1:22

Side two

1. "When the Heron Wakes" – 2:40
2. "Like Summer Tempests" – 1:49
3. "Today's Hero" (Taupin, Quaye, Johnstone, Phillips) – 2:12
4. "Sisters of the Cross" (Taupin, Richard Coff, Diana Lewis) – 2:39
5. "Brothers Together Again" – 2:33
6. "Verses After Dark"
  - "La Petite Marionette" (Taupin, Coff) – 1:33
  - "Ratcatcher" (Taupin, Phillips) – 2:17
  - "The Visitor" (Taupin, Phillips) – 2:27

== Personnel ==
- Bernie Taupin – spoken word
- Ron Chesterman – double bass
- Richard Coff – violin, viola
- Diana Lewis – piano
- Shawn Phillips – sitar, electric guitar, 6- and 12-string acoustic guitars, koto, spoken word
- Caleb Quaye – piano, organ, acoustic guitar
- Davey Johnstone – sitar, acoustic guitar, banjo, mandolin, lute
- Chris Karan – tabla, finger cymbals
