= He Who Rides the Tiger =

Studio album by Bernie Taupin
- Released: 1980
- Recorded: 1979–1980
- Genres: Rock, pop
- Length: 43:58
- Label: Elektra
- Producer: Humberto Gatica

Bernie Taupin chronology
Taupin (1971)	He Who Rides the Tiger (1980)	Tribe (1987)

He Who Rides the Tiger is the 1980 second solo album by longtime Elton John lyricist, Bernie Taupin. It is his follow-up effort following his 1971 spoken word album Taupin. Taupin co-wrote all the songs in the album with the Buckinghams former guitarist Dennis Tufano and sang lead vocals in all of them. Although the album was recorded during a time when John and Taupin had interrupted their collaboration, John lent backing vocals on "Love (The Barren Desert)". The album was re-released on CD by American Beat Records on March 10, 2009.

== Critical reception ==
In a review of May 3, 1980, Billboard said that the album's "biggest strength lies in his lyrics" and that "Taupin isn't a bad vocalist," but his vocals "become a bit too stagnant."

== Track listing ==
All songs written by Bernie Taupin (words) and Dennis Tufano (music).

1. "Monkey on My Back (The Last Run)" (4:04)
2. "Born on the Fourth of July" (4:47)
3. "Venezuela" (4:11)
4. "Approaching Armageddon" (5:36)
5. "Lover's Cross" (4:40)
6. "Blitz Babies" (4:31)
7. "Valley Nights" (4:23)
8. "Love (The Barren Desert)" (5:32)
9. "The Whores of Paris" (6:22)

== Personnel ==
- Bernie Taupin - lead vocals
- Joey Carbone - keyboards
- Kenny Passarelli - bass guitar, vocals
- Dennis Tufano - rhythm guitar, vocals
- Carlos Vega - drums
- Paulinho da Costa - percussion
- Dee Murray - bass guitar
- Richie Zito - electric guitar, acoustic guitar
- Jeff Porcaro - drums
- David Foster - keyboards, synthesizer
- Tom Scott - saxophone, flute, lyricon
- David Hungate - bass guitar
- Steve Lukather - electric guitar
- Ralph Dyke - synthesizer, programming
- Jay Graydon - electric guitar
- Paul Lani - percussion
- Michael Boddicker - keyboards, programming, synthesizer
- Erich Bulling - charango, flute, acoustic guitar, ocarina
- Elton John - backing vocals
- Alan Gorrie - backing vocals
- Hamish Stuart - backing vocals
- Bill Champlin - backing vocals
- Venette Gloud - backing vocals
- Paulette Brown - backing vocals
- Tommy Funderburk - backing vocals
- Tom Kelly - backing vocals
