= The Sea Has No Mercy =

Studio album by Bernie Taupin
- Released: 23 October 2026
- Studios: Sun Dog (Brentwood); Sound Emporium (Nashville); Oceanway (Nashville); Sundragon (Van Nuys); Phil Zone (Maple Valley); Capital Mixers (Albany); Dave's Room (North Hollywood)
- Genre: Folk
- Length: 49:26
- Label: Vertigo
- Producer: Frank Liddell

Bernie Taupin chronology
Tribe (1987)	The Sea Has No Mercy (2026)

Singles from The Sea Has No Mercy
- 1. "The Sea Has No Mercy" Released: 28 July 2026; 2. "One Hundred Ways" Released: 21 August 2026; 3. "Come on California" Released: 18 September 2026

The Sea Has No Mercy is the fourth studio album by the English songwriter Bernie Taupin. It was released on 23 October 2026, through Vertigo Records. Produced by Frank Liddell, it is Taupin's first solo album in almost 40 years, following Tribe (1987), and the first that Taupin has written solely by himself.

== Track listing ==
All tracks are written by Bernie Taupin.

The Sea Has No Mercy track listing
No.	Title	Length
1.	"Fisherman"	5:11
2.	"Old Church Road"	5:09
3.	"The Sea Has No Mercy"	3:57
4.	"Elephant Boy"	5:11
5.	"Ghosts of Greater Men"	4:24
6.	"Joker"	5:51
7.	"Come on California" (featuring Brandi Carlile)	4:59
8.	"The Favor"	5:46
9.	"Old Dog"	6:17
10.	"One Hundred Ways" (featuring Georgey Devon Taupin)	2:41
Total length:		49:26

== Personnel ==
Credited are adapted from the album's liner notes and Tidal.

=== Musicians ===
- Bernie Taupin – vocals, arrangements (all tracks); background vocals, baritone horn (track 4)
- Glen Worf – bass, arrangements (all tracks); upright bass (2, 3), background vocals (4)
- Adam Wright – guitars, arrangements (all tracks); background vocals (1, 4, 9); harmonica, wind chimes (1)
- Michael Rojas – keyboards, arrangements (all tracks); piano (1, 2, 5), synthesizer (1, 2); guitar, harp, wind chimes (1); organ (2, 4, 6, 9, 10), Wurlitzer organ (3, 5, 7, 9), Mellotron (3, 5), upright piano (4, 5); background vocals, harmonica (4); accordion (7); bells, vibraphone (8)
- Eleonore Denig – viola, violin, string arrangement (1, 8)
- Shannon Wright – background vocals (1)
- Armand Hutton – background vocal arrangement (2, 5, 6), French horn arrangement (3), background vocals (6)
- Jedd Hughes – acoustic guitar, banjo (2); electric guitar (8)
- Lee Ann Womack – background vocals (2, 9)
- The Jeremy Jordon Ensemble – background vocals (2)
- Jeremy Jordon – conducting (2)
- Michelle McCleary – French horn (3)
- Jay Bellerose – drum kit, percussion (4–7, 9)
- Thomm Jutz – 5-string banjo, acoustic guitar (4)
- Frank Liddell – background vocals (4)
- Harrison Whitford – slide guitar (7), electric guitar (10)
- Brandi Carlile – vocals (7)
- Anna Lise Liddell – background vocals (8)
- Scarlet Rivera – viola, violin, string arrangement (9)
- Georgey Devon Taupin – vocals (10)

=== Technical and creative ===
- Frank Liddell – production
- Anna Lise Liddell – recording, mixing, The Tennessee Stone Cutters photography
- Jay Bellerose – recording
- Skyler Chuckry – recording assistance, mixing assistance
- Anika Heywood – recording assistance, mixing assistance
- Kaitlyn Walker – recording assistance, mixing assistance
- Riley Aasby – recording assistance, mixing assistance
- William Carroll – additional recording
- Jerry Streeter – additional recording
- John Raspante – additional recording
- Brandon Bell – additional editing
- David Spreng – drum recording and engineering
- Bernie Taupin – album cover concept
- Nemo Agency – album cover design
- James Isaacs – album cover design
- Jill Augusto – back sleeve photography, Polaroid photography
- Stephen Marcussen – mastering
- Bernie Grundman – vinyl cut
- Brittany Hamlin – production coordination

== Charts ==
Chart (2026)	Peak position
Scottish Albums (Official Charts)	23
UK Album Sales (OCC)	22
UK Physical Albums (OCC)	22
