= Ball and Chain (Elton John song) =

"Ball & Chain"

Single by Elton John

from the album Jump Up!
- B-side: "Where Have All the Good Times Gone" (alternate version)
- Released: September 1982
- Recorded: September–October 1981
- Genre: Rock, acoustic pop
- Length: 3:27
- Label: Geffen (US); Rocket (UK)
- Songwriter(s): Elton John, Gary Osborne
- Producer(s): Chris Thomas

Elton John singles chronology
| "Princess" (1982) | "Ball & Chain" (1982) | "All Quiet on the Western Front" (1982) |

"Ball & Chain" is a song by British musician Elton John with lyrics by Gary Osborne. It is the third track on his 1982 album Jump Up! and was released as a single in the United States in September that year. It features Pete Townshend of the Who on acoustic guitar. In 1983, country music artist Earl Thomas Conley covered the song on his third album "Don't Make It Easy For Me". In 1985, country music artist Kathy Mattea covered the song on her second album From My Heart.

== Musical structure ==
The song opens with Townshend's percussive guitar playing, and subtle piano from John. The song then builds to a climactic finish, placing the final verse one octave higher.

== Release ==
It was released in the US in September 1982 without charting and was performed by John during the 1982 leg of his Jump Up Tour.

Billboard called it "plain good fun, with a buoyant rhythm guitar and crisp production."

== Music video ==
A promotional video was made for this song featuring John singing the song without playing piano with his classic band performing in a white background.

== Charts ==
| Chart (1982) | Peak position |
|---|---|
| US Mainstream Rock (Billboard) | 14 |

== Personnel ==
- Elton John – vocals, acoustic piano
- James Newton Howard – synthesizers
- Pete Townshend – acoustic guitar
- Richie Zito – electric guitar
- Dee Murray – bass
- Jeff Porcaro – drums
- Steve Holly – tambourine
