= Tribe (Bernie Taupin album) =

Studio album by Bernie Taupin
- Released: 1987
- Genre: Pop rock
- Length: 48:06
- Label: RCA
- Producer: Martin Page

Bernie Taupin chronology
He Who Rides the Tiger (1980)	Tribe (1987)	The Sea Has No Mercy (2026)

Professional ratings
Review scores
Source	Rating
AllMusic	2.5/5 stars

Tribe is the 1987 third solo album by Bernie Taupin issued by RCA Records. The album includes the two singles, "Friend of the Flag" and "Citizen Jane". Music videos were made for both singles.

== Track listing ==
All songs written by Bernie Taupin and Martin Page. Two other songs written by Taupin and Page around the same time, "Backbone" and "White Boys in Chains", were used as the B-sides to the singles "Friend of the Flag" and "Citizen Jane", respectively.

1. "Friend of the Flag" (4:37)
2. "Corrugated Iron" (4:54)
3. "Citizen Jane" (4:55)
4. "Hold Back the Night" (4:46)
5. "She Sends Shivers" (with Martha Davis) (4:21)
6. "Billy Fury" (with Elton John) (4:44)
7. "I Still Can't Believe That You're Gone" (5:15)
8. "Conquistador" (4:36)
9. "The New Lone Ranger" (4:59)
10. "Desperation Train" (5:11)

== Personnel ==
=== Tribe (the "band") ===
- Bernie Taupin - lead vocals
- Martin Page - electric and Fretless bass, drum and percussion programming, additional keyboards, vocals
- Brian Fairweather - guitar, vocals
- Paul Fox - keyboards
- Craig Krampf - drums, additional drum programming, vocals

=== Additional musicians ===
- Bruce Hornsby - piano, accordion
- Larry Williams - saxophone
- Hammer Smith - harmonica
- Fred Mandel - keyboards
- Paul Delph - keyboards, backing vocals
- Martha Davis – lead vocals on "She Sends Shivers"

=== Additional backing vocalists ===
- Stevie Bensusen, John Cannon, Alan Carvell, Tommy Funderburk, Elton John, Shirley Lewis, Gordon Neville, Sylvia St. James, Hamish Stuart, Margaret Taylor

== Charts ==
Chart (1987)	Peak position
Australia (Kent Music Report)	87
