= Teacher I Need You =

1973 song by Elton John

Song by Elton John

from the album Don't Shoot Me I'm Only the Piano Player
- Released: 22 January 1973 (UK); 26 January 1973 (USA)
- Recorded: June 1972, Château d'Hérouville, France
- Genre: Rock
- Length: 4:10
- Label: DJM Records; MCA Records (US/Canada-1975)
- Songwriters: Elton John, Bernie Taupin
- Producer: Gus Dudgeon

"Teacher I Need You" is a song written by English musician Elton John and songwriter Bernie Taupin, and performed by John. It was first released on John's 1973 album Don't Shoot Me I'm Only the Piano Player. The lyrics tell of a schoolboy's crush on his teacher, and the music evokes the sound of 1950s songs.

Although never released as a single, the song was popular on album-oriented rock radio stations. It was included in John's live concert sets on a number of tours, including 1973, 1982 and 1984. Artists who have covered the song include Richard Marx and Stephen Cummings.

== Lyrics and music ==
The lyrics, by Taupin, describe a schoolboy's sexual desire for his female teacher. Allmusic critic Donald A. Guarisco notes that the "witty, insightful" lyrics maintain the listener's interest by "packing it with details that vividly bring the boy’s hormonal crush to life," such as the lines:

It’s a natural achievement
Conquering my homework
With her image pounding in my brain

Guarisco also praises the way the lyrics portray the boy's "believable frustration" over his predicament. Like a number of other songs written by Taupin and John, the lyrics make references to American movie stars, in this case John Wayne and Errol Flynn. The singer notes that he imitates Wayne and Flynn but unfortunately for him "it doesn’t mean a doggone thing."

The song has been described as a "retro rocker" and its sound evokes the music of the 1950s and early 1960s. Elton John has stated that his vocal performance on the song was inspired by Bobby Vee, a teen idol in the 1950s and 1960s. John biographer Elizabeth J. Rosenthal describes the song as "a merry uptempo number" and praises its "gleaming harmonies." The song begins with a series of triplets played on the piano, a musical motif John often uses. Guarisco describes the melody of the song as "a rollicking pop melody" that employs syncopation. John's piano playing with fast chord changes is reminiscent of Jerry Lee Lewis. Instrumentation on the song also includes a mellotron.

== Reception ==
Although never released as a single, "Teacher I Need You" was popular on album-oriented rock radio stations. Rolling Stone critic Stephen Holden noted that the song has "the same off-the-cuff buoyancy as "Crocodile Rock" and the same playful attitude toward a semi-mythic past." Allmusic's Guarisco described "Teacher I Need You" as "one of the undisputable highlights of Don’t Shoot Me I’m The Piano Player thanks to its tidy marriage of clever lyrics and melodic craftsmanship.". Mary Anne Cassata describes it as an "overlooked gem." Singer Kyle Vincent stated that the song could stand up against "just about any great power pop song."

== Other appearances ==
Elton John played "Teacher I Need You" live in concert on a number of tours, including 1973, 1982 and 1984. Subsequent to its initial release on Don't Shoot Me I'm Only the Piano Player, "Teacher I Need You" was released on Elton John compilation albums in the UK, including Candle in the Wind in 1978 and The Collection in 1989. The song has been covered by Richard Marx and Stephen Cummings. Cummings' version was used in the 1993 Australian film The Heartbreak Kid.
