= Athletic Park, Wellington =

New Zealand multifunctional stadium in Wellington

Athletic Park
- 1971 Lions Tour of New Zealand
- Interactive map of Athletic Park
- Location: Newtown, Wellington, New Zealand
- Coordinates: 41°19′2″S 174°46′37″E
- Owner: Athletic Park Company (1896–1908); Wellington Rugby Football Union (1908–1999)
- Capacity: 800 (1898); 1,100 (1902); 5,700 (1928); 59,000 (1959); 39,000 (1999)
- Surface: Grass

Construction
- Opened: 6 April 1896
- Closed: 10 October 1999

Tenants
- Wellington Rugby Football Union (1896-1999); New Zealand national rugby union team (1904-1999); Wellington Hurricanes (1996-1999)

Athletic Park was a rugby union ground located in Newtown, a suburb of Wellington, New Zealand. It was owned and operated by the Wellington Rugby Football Union, and was used for Wellington first-class matches, as well as local club matches. It hosted the first New Zealand national rugby union team (All Blacks) home test match in 1904, and continued to be used as a regular venue for All Blacks home matches until its closure and demolition in 1999. It was also the primary home ground of the Wellington Hurricanes (now known as the Hurricanes) between 1996 and 1999.

== History ==
The ground was an open park overlooking Cook Strait and the Pacific Ocean and was therefore exposed to Wellington's regular strong winds. For this reason, it was described by French journalist Denis Lalanne as a "desolate, cyclone-swept stadium... pitiful and at the same time wonderful." It was famous for the Millard Stand, a very steep grandstand which used to sway in the winds. The Millard Stand was completed in 1961 and named for Wellington Rugby Football Union administrator J. N. Millard. The Millard Stand replaced the Western Bank, a section that was so popular that fans would camp at the ground overnight to ensure they could sit there. The regular patrons of the Western Bank, referred to as "Bankers", were considered particularly knowledgeable about rugby union.

Towards the end of its life, the stadium fell into a poor condition but was still cherished by the public. Throughout the 1980s several proposals were made to modernise the grounds, but instead a decision was made to build a new stadium. Several alternatives were proposed, including a new stadium in Porirua or revamping the Basin Reserve or Fraser Park in Hutt Valley. The proposal that was ultimately successful was a new stadium built on unused land near the Wellington railway station. This stadium, now formally known as Wellington Regional Stadium and colloquially as "The Cake Tin", was completed in 1999, and Athletic Park closed permanently that same year.

Athletic Park has now been demolished and replaced with a retirement village. The last match played at the ground was on 10 October 1999, between Wellington and Otago in the NPC, with Wellington prevailing 36–16.

== Rugby union ==
=== Test matches ===
Athletic Park hosted 42 Test matches involving the All Blacks from 1904 to 1999, including the 43–6 win over Australia in 1996. The ground record crowd was 59 000 people, set in a 1959 match against the British Lions.

The phenomenon of extreme winds at the ground was most famously displayed in the 1961 Test against France, later nicknamed the "Cyclone Test", as it was played in hurricane-force winds of up to 79 miles per hour (127 kph). Lalanne's review of the match declared it to have been "a nightmare spectacle", with the extreme winds causing the closure of most of the newly built Millard Stand, numerous errors in gameplay and touch kicks that were pushed behind the kicker. New Zealand eventually prevailed 5-3 in the lowest-scoring game of the tour, after Don Clarke made a sideline conversion by kicking almost parallel to the try line, with the wind curling the ball between the posts.

The last Test match played at Athletic Park was against France again on 26 June 1999, with the All Blacks winning 54–7.

=== Rugby World Cup ===
Athletic Park hosted four matches of the 1987 Rugby World Cup.

Date	Competition	Home team		Away team		Attendance
25 May 1987	1987 Rugby World Cup Pool 2	Ireland	6	Wales	13	15,000
28 May 1987	1987 Rugby World Cup Pool 4	France	55	Romania	12	7,000
30 May 1987	1987 Rugby World Cup Pool 4	Scotland	60	Zimbabwe	21	12,000
1 June 1987	1987 Rugby World Cup Pool 3	New Zealand	46	Argentina	15	30,000

== Association football ==
In 1923, Athletic Park hosted the inaugural final of the Chatham Cup, New Zealand's principal knockout association football (soccer) tournament.

== Music and other events ==
Athletic Park also played host to other non-sports events, including a visit by Pope John Paul II in 1986 and various rock concerts.

Kiss performed a concert in 1980 as part of their Unmasked Tour. In 1983, David Bowie and Dire Straits performed at Athletic Park, with further performances by Dire Straits in 1986 and 1991. Elton John performed two concerts there, the first on 10 March 1982 as part of his Jump Up! Tour and the second was on 22 February 1984 as part of his Too Low for Zero Tour. Eurythmics performed on 28 January 1987 as part of their Revenge Tour. AC/DC played there in 1991 on their Razor's Edge tour.

In March 1980, Fleetwood Mac played what was described by Grant Harding of Hawke's Bay Today as "the worst concert ever" at the ground. The band began arguing and fighting amongst themselves during the performance and left the stage, before later returning to continue. Those attending chanted for the return of the supporting band, New Zealand's Street Talk as the music deteriorated.
