= Blue Eyes (Elton John song) =

Single by Elton John

from the album Jump Up!
- B-side: "Hey Papa Legba"
- Released: March 1982
- Recorded: September–October 1981
- Length: 3:27
- Label: Geffen (US); Rocket (UK)
- Songwriters: Elton John; Gary Osborne
- Producer: Chris Thomas

Elton John singles chronology
"Loving You Is Sweeter Than Ever" (1981)	"Blue Eyes" (1982)	"Empty Garden (Hey Hey Johnny)" (1982)

Alternative cover
- International single sleeve

"Blue Eyes" is a song created and performed by British musician Elton John with music written by John and lyrics written by Gary Osborne. It was released in 1982 as the UK lead single from John's 16th studio album, Jump Up! (1982). It was released as the album's second single in the US. It hit No. 8 in the UK; in the US, it spent three weeks at No. 10 on the Cash Box chart, went to No. 12 on the Billboard Hot 100, and spent two weeks at No. 1 on the Billboard AC chart. John performed this song often in his concerts until 2012.

== Music video ==
The music video for the song was filmed in Australia, on Sydney's Bondi to Bronte walk. The exact location is at the most easterly point of Marks Park, Tamarama, where a low, sandstone turret rests on the top of the cliffs and overlooks the Tasman Sea. The white grand piano was positioned right in the middle of the turret. The song and video was in dedication to Elizabeth Taylor.

== Personnel ==
- Elton John – vocals, acoustic piano
- James Newton Howard – Fender Rhodes, synthesizers, string arrangements and conductor
- Dee Murray – bass
- Jeff Porcaro – drums, possible tambourine
- The Mountain Fjord Orchestra – strings
- Gavyn Wright – concertmaster

== Accolades ==
Grammy Awards

Year	Nominee / work	Award	Result
1983	"Blue Eyes"	Best Pop Vocal Performance – Male	Nominated

== Charts ==
=== Weekly charts ===
Chart (1982)	Peak position
Australia (Kent Music Report)	4
Belgium (Ultratop)	8
Canada Top Singles (RPM)	5
Canada Adult Contemporary (RPM)	1
Finland (Suomen virallinen lista)	16
Ireland (IRMA)	8
Luxembourg (Radio Luxembourg)	4
Netherlands (Dutch Top 40)	10
Netherlands (Single Top 100)	19
New Zealand (Recorded Music NZ)	11
South Africa (Springbok Radio)	7
Switzerland (Schweizer Hitparade)	9
UK Singles (OCC)	8
US Billboard Hot 100	12
US Adult Contemporary (Billboard)	1
US Cash Box Top 100	10
West Germany (Official German Charts)	51

=== Year-end charts ===
Chart (1982)	Rank
Australia (Kent Music Report)	54
Brazil (Crowley)	18
Canada Top Singles (RPM)	49
Netherlands (Dutch Top 40)	80
US Billboard Hot 100	62
US Cash Box Top 100	59

== See also ==
- List of Billboard Adult Contemporary number ones of 1982
