= Bernie Taupin =

British lyricist (born 1950)

Bernie Taupin CBE
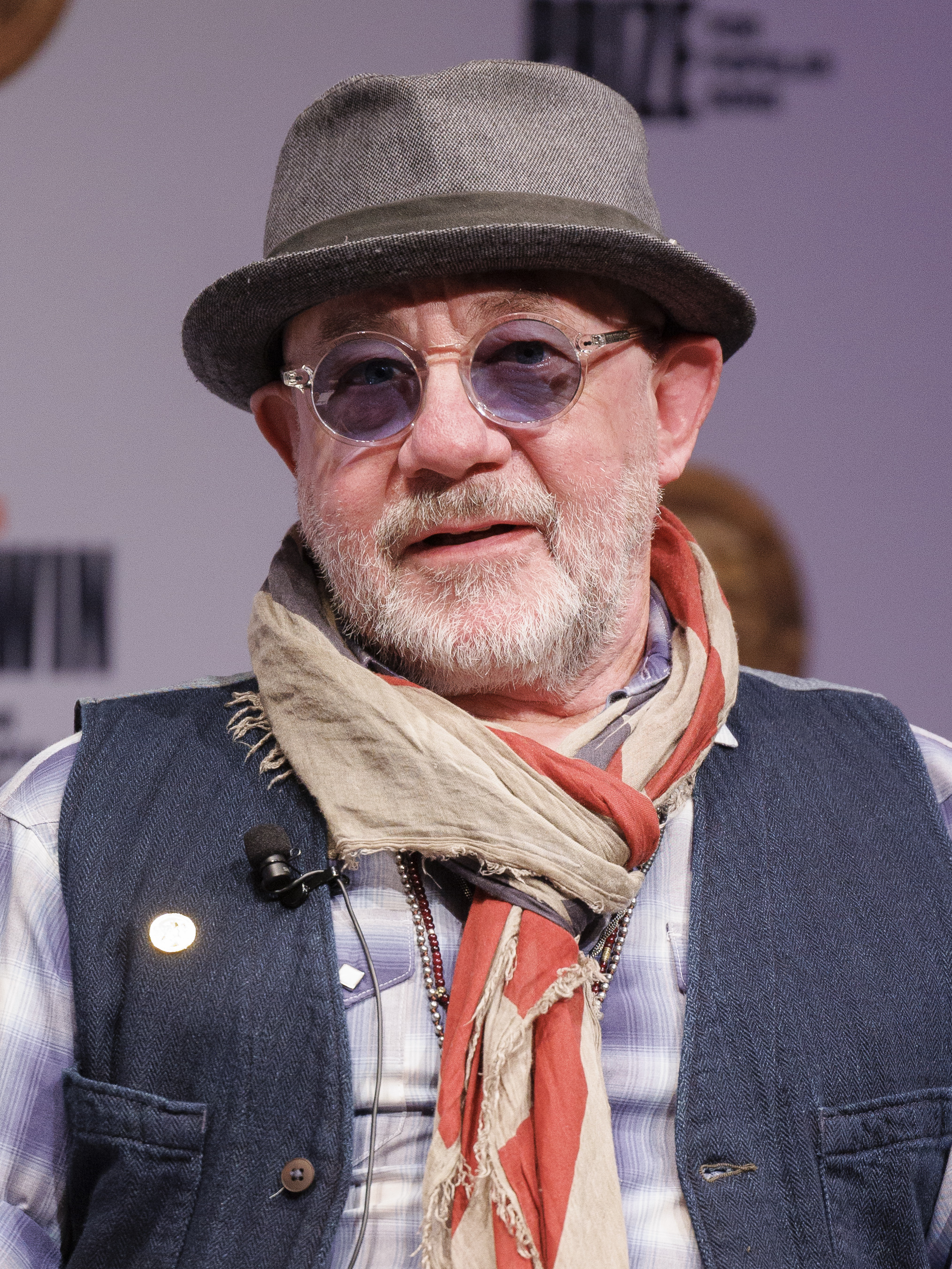
- Taupin in 2024

Background information
- Born: Bernard John Taupin; 22 May 1950 (age 76); Sleaford, Lincolnshire, England
- Genres: Rock; pop; country
- Occupations: Lyricist; visual artist
- Years active: 1967–present
- Spouses: Maxine Feibelman (m. 1971; div. 1977); Toni Lynn Russo (m. 1979; div. 1991); Stephanie Haymes Roven (m. 1993; div. 1998); Heather Kidd (m. 2004)

Bernard John Taupin (taw-PIN; born 22 May 1950) is an English lyricist and visual artist. He is best known for his songwriting partnership with Elton John, recognised as one of the most successful partnerships of its kind in history. Taupin has co-written the majority of John's songs since the 1960s.

In 1967, Taupin answered an advertisement in the music paper New Musical Express placed by Liberty Records, a company that was seeking new songwriters. John responded to the same advertisement and they were brought together, collaborating on many albums since. Taupin and John were inducted into the Songwriters Hall of Fame in 1992.

In 2020, Taupin and John received the Oscar for Best Original Song for "(I'm Gonna) Love Me Again" from the film Rocketman. Taupin was inducted into the Rock and Roll Hall of Fame in the Musical Excellence Award category in 2023. In 2024, Taupin and John were awarded the Gershwin Prize for Popular Song. Also in 2024, Taupin won the Ivor Novello Award for Outstanding Contribution to British Music.

== Birth and childhood ==
Taupin was born at Flatters House, a farmhouse located between the village of Anwick and the town of Sleaford in Lincolnshire, the son of Robert Taupin and Daphne (née Cort). His paternal grandparents were French, the Taupin family having come to London at the turn of the 20th century to set up a wine-importing business.

Taupin's father was educated in Dijon and was employed as a stockman by a large farm estate near the town of Market Rasen, Lincolnshire. Taupin's mother spent most of the Second World War living in Switzerland. On her return to London, she worked as a governess for the Taupin family, in which connection she met Robert Taupin, whom she married in 1947. The family later moved to Rowston Manor, where they lived rent-free because of Robert's promotion to farm manager. This was a significant step up from Flatters farmhouse, which had no electricity.

In 1959, Taupin's father decided to try independent farming, and the family moved to the north Lincolnshire village of Owmby-by-Spital, where they lived at the run-down 10-acre Maltkiln Farm, the income from which derived from battery-farming chickens for eggs. The house lacked heating and up-to-date plumbing. Taupin's 11-year-younger brother, Kit, was born there.

Unlike his elder brother, Tony, who attended a grammar school and later went to university, Taupin was not a diligent student, although he showed an early flair for writing. At 15, he left school and started work as a trainee in the print room of the local newspaper, the Lincolnshire Standard, with aspirations of becoming a journalist. Taupin soon left that job, and spent the rest of his teenage years hanging out with friends, hitchhiking the country roads to attend youth club dances in the surrounding villages, playing snooker in the Aston Arms pub in Market Rasen, and drinking. Taupin had worked at several part-time jobs when, at 17, he answered the advertisement that eventually led to his collaboration with Elton John.

== Early influences ==
Taupin's mother had studied French literature, and his maternal grandfather John Leonard Patchett "Poppy" Cort, a classics teacher and graduate of the University of Cambridge, instilled in him an appreciation for nature and literature and narrative poetry, all of which influenced his early lyrics.

== Collaborative career ==
=== Collaboration with Elton John (1967–present) ===
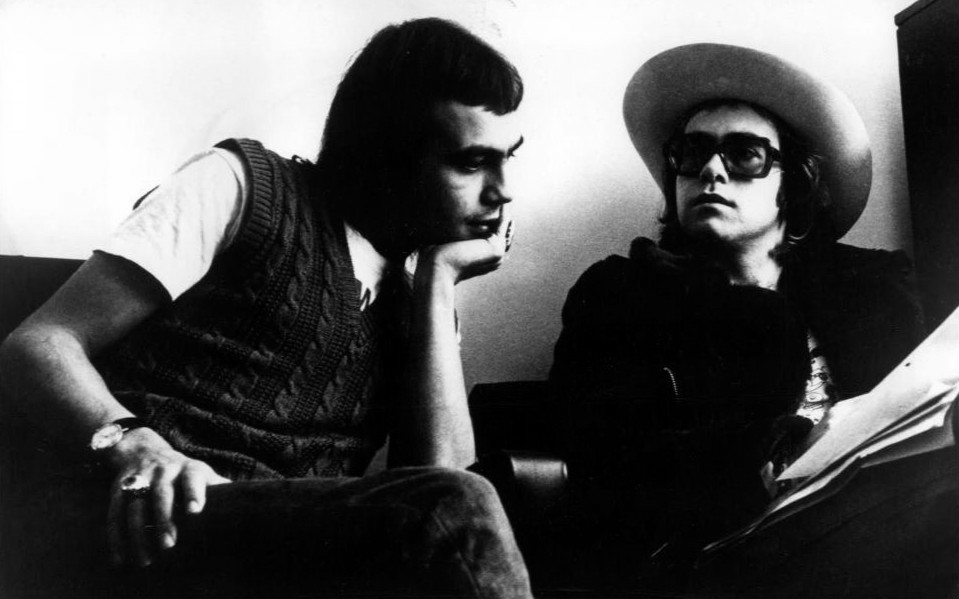
Taupin (left) with Elton John, 1971

In 1967, Taupin answered an advertisement for talent that was placed in the NME by Liberty Records A&R man Ray Williams. Elton John answered the same advert. Neither Taupin nor John passed the audition for Liberty Records. Elton told the man behind the desk that he could not write lyrics, so the man handed Elton a sealed envelope from the pile of people submitting lyrics, which he opened on the London Underground ride home. The envelope contained poems by Taupin.

The duo have collaborated on more than thirty albums since. The team took some time off from each other for a while between 1977 and 1979, while Taupin worked with other songwriters, including Alice Cooper, and John worked with other lyricists, including Gary Osborne and Tom Robinson. (The 1978 single-only A side "Ego" was their only collaboration of note during the period, although John/Taupin B-sides such as "Lovesick" and "I Cry at Night" were issued with the respective singles "Song for Guy" and "Part-time Love" from the album A Single Man.)

John and Taupin resumed writing together on an occasional basis in 1980, with Taupin contributing lyrics to several songs on albums such as 21 at 33, The Fox, and Jump Up!. However, by 1983's Too Low for Zero, the two renewed their partnership on a full-time basis and from that point forward Taupin was again John's primary lyricist for his solo releases. John often works with other lyricists on specific theatrical or film projects such as 1994's The Lion King and 2000's Aida, both of which featured lyrics by Tim Rice, and 2005's Billy Elliot, which has script and lyrics by the original film's screenwriter, Lee Hall. Hall also wrote the screenplay for the Elton John biopic Rocketman, in which Taupin features as a major character.

Taupin wrote the lyrics for "Rocket Man", "Levon", "Crocodile Rock", "Honky Cat", "Tiny Dancer", "Candle in the Wind", "Saturday Night's Alright for Fighting", "Bennie and the Jets", "Goodbye Yellow Brick Road", "Mona Lisas and Mad Hatters", "Don't Let the Sun Go Down on Me", "The Bitch is Back", "Daniel", and 1970's "Your Song", their first hit. Hits in the 1980s include "I'm Still Standing", "I Guess That's Why They Call It The Blues", "Sad Songs", and "Nikita". In the 1990s, Taupin and John had more hits, including "The One", "Simple Life", "The Last Song", "Club at the End of the Street" and "Believe". In September 1997, Taupin rewrote the lyrics of "Candle in the Wind" for "Candle in the Wind 1997", a tribute to the late Diana, Princess of Wales.

I thought it was very important to project it from a nation's standpoint. I wanted to make it sound like a country singing it. From the first couple of lines I wrote [which began "Goodbye England's Rose"], the rest sort of fell into place.

— Bernie Taupin on writing the lyrics
for "Candle in the Wind 1997"

The 1991 film documentary Two Rooms described the John/Taupin writing style, which involves Taupin writing the lyrics on his own and John then putting them to music, with no further interaction between the two. The process is still fundamentally the same, with John composing to Taupin's words, but the two interact on songs far more today, with Taupin joining John in the studio as the songs are written and occasionally during recording sessions.

Taupin and John had their first Broadway musical open in March 2006 with Lestat: The Musical. Taupin wrote lyrics for 10 songs (and an 11th completed non-album track "Across the River Thames") for John's 2006 album The Captain & The Kid (sequel to Captain Fantastic and the Brown Dirt Cowboy) and appeared on the cover with him for the first time marking their 40th anniversary of working together. ("Across the River Thames" was issued as an Internet-only download as a bonus with certain editions of The Captain & the Kid.)

On 25 March 2007, Taupin made a surprise appearance at John's 60th birthday celebration at Madison Square Garden, briefly discussing their 40-year songwriting partnership. Of Taupin's importance to their careers, as recorded on the Elton 60 – Live at Madison Square Garden DVD, John told the audience that without Taupin there probably would not be an 'Elton John' as the public has come to know him. Taupin and John also composed several songs for The Union, a collaboration album between Elton and his longtime hero Leon Russell released in October 2010. They also collaborated on five original songs for the 2011 Miramax movie Gnomeo and Juliet, including the Golden Globe-nominated "Hello Hello". Taupin and John's most-recent album collaboration is Wonderful Crazy Night, released in 2016.

In 2018, Taupin and John collaborated on two original songs for the animated film Sherlock Gnomes. In 2019, the movie Rocketman was released, containing an original song written by Taupin and John for the film, "(I'm Gonna) Love Me Again", which plays over the closing credits. The film depicts the personal friendship of Taupin (played by Jamie Bell) and John (played by Taron Egerton) during the 1970s and 1980s. They won the Academy Award for Best Original Song for "(I'm Gonna) Love Me Again".

=== Collaboration with other artists ===
In addition to writing for Elton John, Taupin has also written lyrics for use by other composers, with notable successes including "We Built This City", which was recorded by Starship, and "These Dreams", recorded by Heart (both of which were collaborations with English composer/musician Martin Page). In 1978, he co-wrote the album From the Inside with Alice Cooper.

Taupin also produced American Gothic for singer-songwriter David Ackles. Released in 1972, it did not enjoy big sales, but the album was highly acclaimed by music critics in the US and UK. The influential British music critic Derek Jewell of the UK Sunday Times described the album as being "the Sgt. Pepper of folk." Of Ackles's four albums, it was the only one recorded in England rather than in the United States. Taupin and Ackles had become acquainted when Ackles was selected to be the co-headlining act for Elton John's 1970 American debut at the Troubadour in Los Angeles. Taupin was mentioned specifically as being one of the reasons American Gothic was selected by the writers and editors for inclusion in the book, 1001 Albums You Must Hear Before You Die. He also collaborated on the book Burning Cold with photographer Gary Bernstein. In the late 1980s and early 1990s Taupin also collaborated with French American musician, Josquin Des Pres on at least 13 songs in his collection that have been performed and recorded by artists worldwide.

In 2002, Willie Nelson and Kid Rock recorded "Last Stand in Open Country" for Nelson's album The Great Divide. The song was the title track of the first album from Taupin's band Farm Dogs (see below). Nelson's album included two other Taupin songs, "This Face" and "Mendocino County Line". The latter, a duet between Nelson and Lee Ann Womack, was made into a video and released as the album's first single. The song won the 2003 Grammy for best vocal collaboration in country music. In 2004, he co-wrote Courtney Love's song "Uncool", from her 2004 debut solo album America's Sweetheart. In 2005, he co-wrote the title track to What I Really Want for Christmas with Brian Wilson for his first seasonal album. In 2006, he won a Golden Globe Award for his lyrics to the song "A Love That Will Never Grow Old" from the film Brokeback Mountain. The music of the song was composed by Argentine producer and songwriter Gustavo Santaolalla.

== Works as a performer ==
In 1971, Taupin recorded a spoken-word album titled Taupin, in which he recites some of his early poems against a background of impromptu, sitar-heavy music created by some members of Elton's band, including Davey Johnstone and Caleb Quaye. Side one, "Child", contains poems about his early childhood in southern Lincolnshire. The first poem, "The Greatest Discovery", which looks at his birth from the perspective of his older brother Tony, was also set to music by Elton John and included on John's second album, Elton John. There are poems about Taupin's first two childhood homes, Flatters and Rowston Manor, and others about his relationship with his brother and grandfather. Side Two includes a variety of poems of varying obscurity, from a marionette telling her own story to a rat catcher who falls victim to his prey. Taupin stated in interviews that he was not pleased with the album.

In 1980, Taupin recorded his first album as a singer, He Who Rides the Tiger. The album failed to make a dent in the charts. Taupin later suggested in interviews that he did not have the creative control he would have liked over the album. In 1987, he recorded another album, Tribe. The songs were co-written with Martin Page. "Citizen Jane" and "Friend of the Flag" were released as singles. Videos of both singles featured Rene Russo, the sister of Taupin's then wife Toni.

In 1996, Taupin formed a band called Farm Dogs, whose two albums were conscious (and successful) throwbacks to the grittier, earthier sound of Tumbleweed Connection. While Taupin wrote the lyrics, the music was a collaborative effort among the band members. Their first album, 1996's Last Stand in Open Country, received critical praise but little airplay. The title track was later recorded by Willie Nelson and Kid Rock for Nelson's 2002 album The Great Divide. In 1998, Farm Dogs released its second and final album, Immigrant Sons. The album was unsuccessful despite a tour of small clubs across America.

== Non-musical projects ==
In 1973, Taupin collected all his lyrics up through the Goodbye Yellow Brick Road album into a book, Bernie Taupin: The One Who Writes the Words for Elton John. In addition to the lyrics from the albums, this book contained the lyrics to all the single B-sides, various rarities, and Taupin's 1970 spoken-word album. The songs are illustrated by various artists, friends, and celebrity guests such as John Lennon and Joni Mitchell. The book is in black & white except for the cover.

In 1977, Taupin collaborated with rock photographer David Nutter on It's A Little Bit Funny, adding text and helping chronicle Elton John's year-long Louder Than Concorde Tour. The now-collectible book was published in hard and soft cover editions by Penguin Books. It collects the better part of one year's worth of personal adventures and memories of Elton and the band, aboard his private plane, on the beaches of Barbados, at backstage gatherings and in some quieter off-stage moments with friends (including some famous faces that Elton and Bernie met and palled around with in their travels).

In 1978, Taupin also appeared in an episode of The Hardy Boys/Nancy Drew Mysteries, "The Hardy Boys & Nancy Drew Meet Dracula", singing backup to Shaun Cassidy. In 1988, Taupin published an autobiography of his childhood, A Cradle of Haloes: Sketches of a Childhood. The book was released only in the UK. It tells the tale of a childhood fuelled by fantasy in rural Lincolnshire in the 1950s and 1960s, ending in 1969 as Taupin gets on the train to seek his fortune in London.

In 1991, Taupin self-published a book of poems called The Devil at High Noon. In 1994, Taupin's lyrics up through the Made in England album were collected into a hardcover book, Elton John & Bernie Taupin: The Complete Lyrics, published by Hyperion. However, it does not appear that Taupin was intimately involved in this project, as it contains multiple misspellings and outright misrenderings of the lyrics. It is also missing some of the rarities and B-sides found in the earlier collection. As with the 1973 collection, the songs are illustrated by various artists, this time in full colour throughout.

In 1992, Taupin was asked to produce a benefit for AIDS Project Los Angeles. The event featured no songs written by the writer, instead opening with an acoustic set of performances of material chosen by the performers followed by selections from the musical West Side Story, chosen for its "timeless message of tolerance that is relevant to every decade."

=== Visual art career ===
In addition to his music, much of his time is spent creating his visual art. Attributing his passion for art to his mother, Daphne, Taupin began displaying and selling his original artwork in 2010. Consisting of large, mixed media, contemporary assemblages, the art has been shown and collected across the United States and Canada.

Taupin's artwork has been seen at Art Miami, Art Southampton, the LA Art Fair, and in various galleries. His artwork often incorporates the American flag.

== Personal life ==
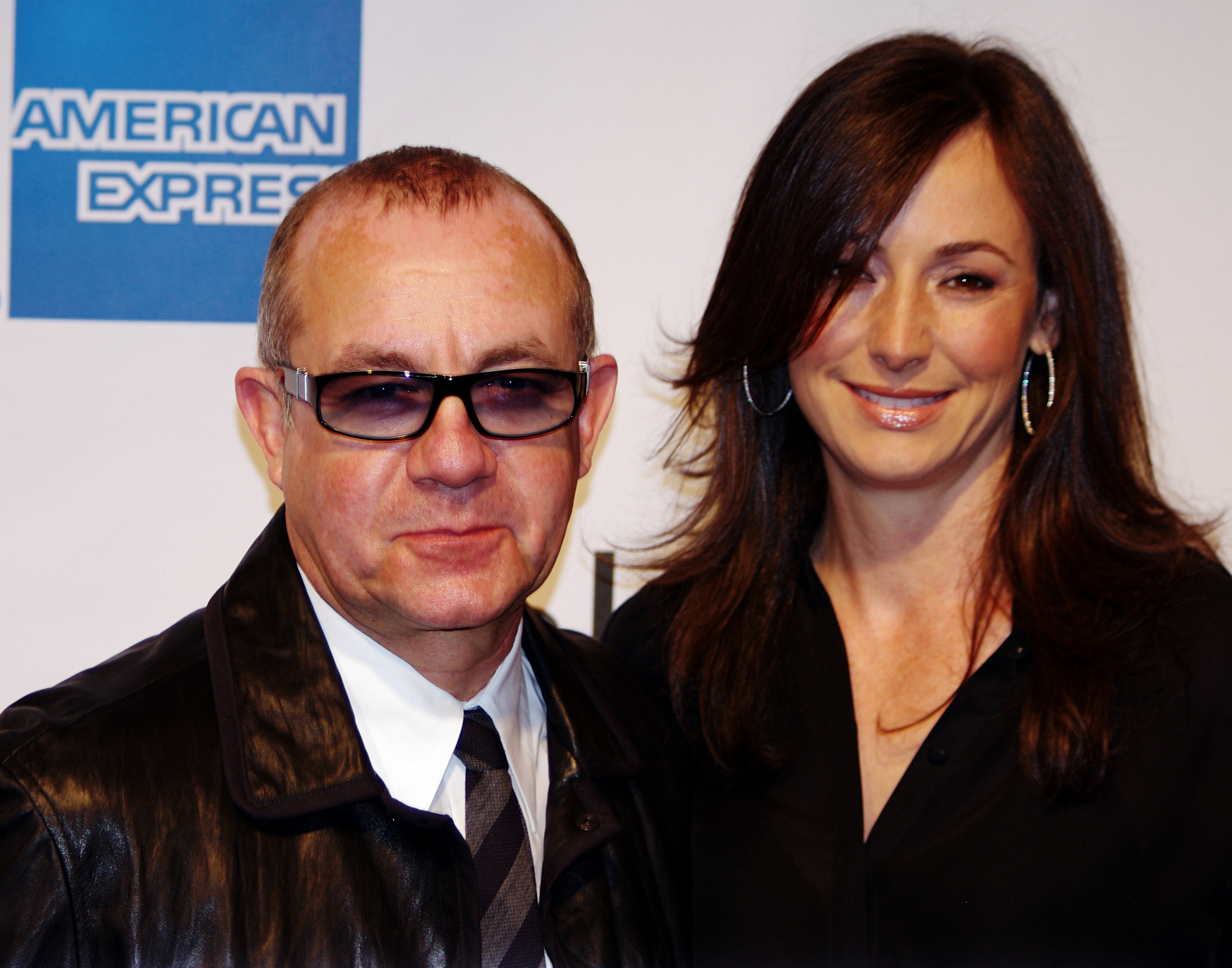
Taupin and wife Heather, attending the premiere of The Union at the Tribeca Film Festival, April 2011

Taupin has been married four times. His first three marriages ended in divorce. His wives were: Maxine Feibelman (1971–77); Toni Lynn Russo (1979–91), sister of actress Rene Russo; Stephanie Haymes Roven (1993–98), daughter of entertainers Dick Haymes and Fran Jeffries; and Heather Kidd (March 2004–present), with whom he has two daughters.

Taupin moved to the United States from England in the mid-1970s. In 1990, he became a U.S. citizen and lives in Santa Barbara County, California.

Taupin was part-owner of the American bucking bull Little Yellow Jacket, who competed in the Professional Bull Riders (PBR) circuit and was PBR Bull of the Year from 2002 through 2004.

Taupin was appointed Commander of the Order of the British Empire (CBE), in the 2022 New Year Honours, for services to music.

== Discography ==
=== Solo albums ===
- 1971 – Taupin
- 1980 – He Who Rides the Tiger
- 1987 – Tribe
- 2026 – The Sea Has No Mercy

=== With Farm Dogs ===
- 1996 – Last Stand in Open Country
- 1998 – Immigrant Sons

== Bibliography ==
- 1971 – The Songs of Elton John and Bernie Taupin (sheet music)
- 1973 – Bernie Taupin: The One Who Writes the Words for Elton John
- 1977 – Elton: It's a Little Bit Funny
- 1978 – Burning Cold
- 1988 – A Cradle of Haloes: Sketches of a Childhood
- 1991 – The Devil at High Noon
- 1991 – Two Rooms: Elton John and Bernie Taupin
- 2023 – Scattershot: Life, Music, Elton, and Me

== See also ==
- List of songs with lyrics by Bernie Taupin
