= List of concert tours by Elton John =

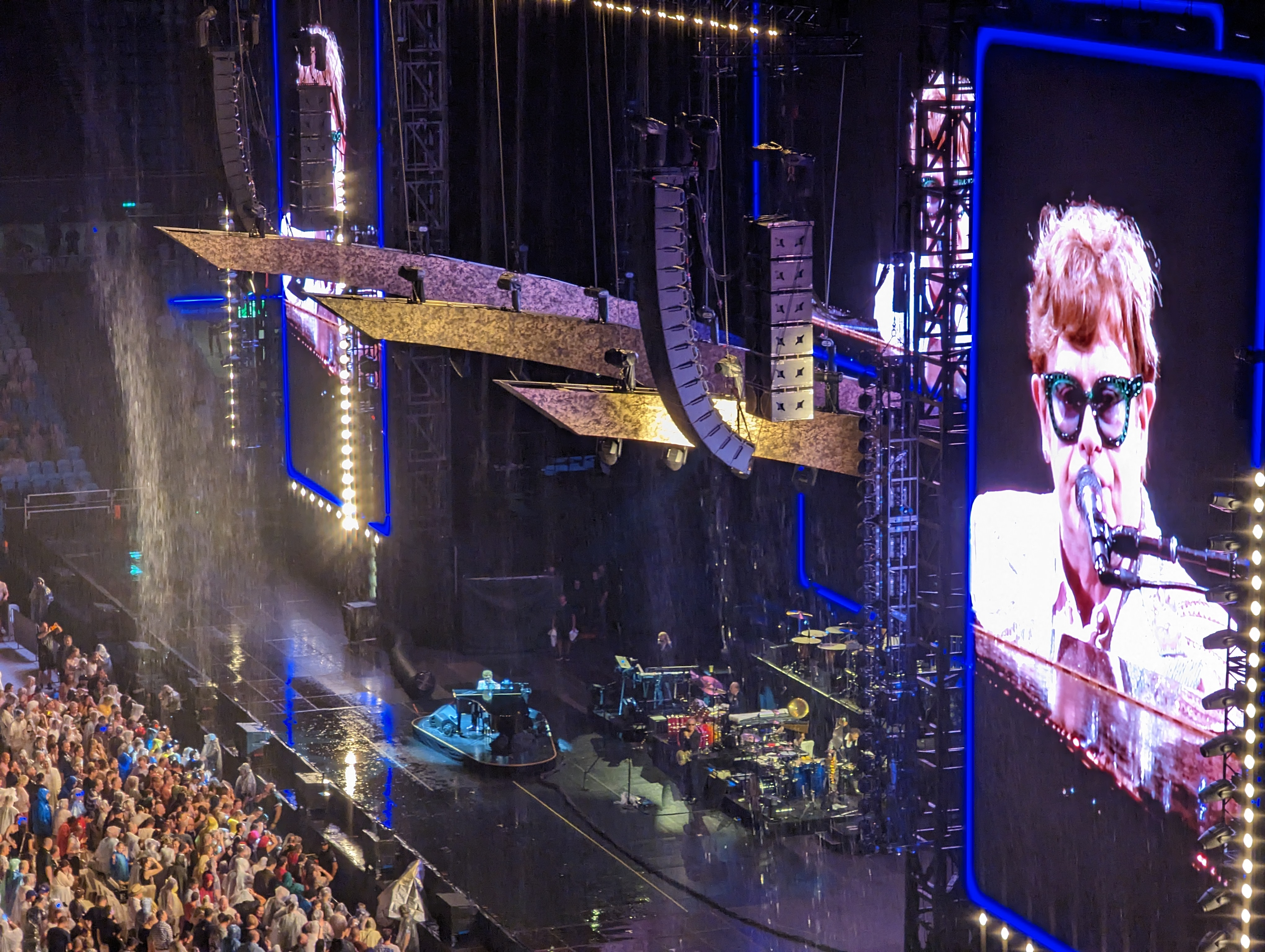
Elton John performing in 2023

Elton John is a British singer, songwriter and pianist. He has collaborated with lyricist Bernie Taupin since 1967 and is one of the most successful artists of all time, having sold over 300 million records worldwide in a six-decade career in music. From starting his music career in 1969 to retiring from touring in 2023, John did over 4,000 concert performances in more than 80 countries.

John's first tour was the 1970 World Tour, which began in support of his second album Elton John. Between 1979 and 2014, John toured Israel and the USSR with Ray Cooper in a total 234 concerts. Between 1994 and 2010, John toured extensively with fellow pianist and musician Billy Joel in the "Face to Face" tours, which became the longest running and most successful concert tandem in pop music history. John's most recent tour is the Farewell Yellow Brick Road tour, intended as John's final tour which concluded in July 2023. John has said that he will continue to "do the odd show" despite his retirement from touring.

In a 2026 interview with Stephen Colbert, Barack Obama revealed that the first concert he ever went to was a 1973 Elton John concert in Hawaii during the Goodbye Yellow Brick Road tour.

== Tours ==
- Elton John 1970 World Tour (1970)
- Goodbye Yellow Brick Road Tour (1973–1974)
- Caribou Tour (1974)
- Rock of the Westies Tour (1975)
- Louder Than Concorde Tour (1976)
- A Single Man Tour (1979)
- Elton John's 1979 tour of the Soviet Union (1979)
- 1980 World Tour (1980)
- Jump Up Tour (1982–1983)
- Too Low for Zero Tour (1984)
- European Express Tour (1984)
- Breaking Hearts Tour (1984)
- Ice on Fire Tour (1985–1986)
- Tour De Force (1986)
- Reg Strikes Back Tour (1988–1989)
- Sleeping with the Past Tour (1989–1990)
- The One Tour (1992–1993)
- Face to Face 1994; with Billy Joel (1994)
- Face to Face 1995; with Billy Joel (1995)
- Made in England Tour (1995)
- Big Picture Tour (1997–1998)
- Face to Face 1998; with Billy Joel (1998)
- An Evening with Elton John (1999)
- Medusa Tour (1999–2000)
- Stately Home Tour (2000)
- Face to Face 2001; with Billy Joel (2001)
- 2001 Solo Tour (2001)
- Songs from the West Coast Tour (2001–2002)
- Face to Face 2002; with Billy Joel (2002)
- A Journey Through Time (2002)
- Elton John 2003 Tour (2003)
- Face to Face 2003; with Billy Joel (2003)
- Elton John 2004 Tour (2004)
- Peachtree Road Tour (2004–2005)
- Elton John 2006 European Tour (2006)
- The Captain and the Kid Tour (2006–2008)
- Rocket Man: Greatest Hits Live (2007–2010)
- Face to Face 2009; with Billy Joel (2009)
- Face to Face 2010; with Billy Joel (2010)
- Elton John 2010 European Tour (2010)
- The Union Tour; with Leon Russell (2010)
- Greatest Hits Tour (2011–2012)
- 40th Anniversary of the Rocket Man (2012–2013)
- The Diving Board Tour (2013–2014)
- Follow the Yellow Brick Road Tour (2014)
- All the Hits Tour (2015)
- The Final Curtain Tour (2015)
- Wonderful Crazy Night Tour (2016–2018)
- Once in a Lifetime (2017)
- Farewell Yellow Brick Road (2018–2023)

== See also ==
- List of highest-grossing live music artists
- List of highest-grossing concert tours
- List of most-attended concert tours
