= Elton John Band =

Supporting band of the musician Elton John

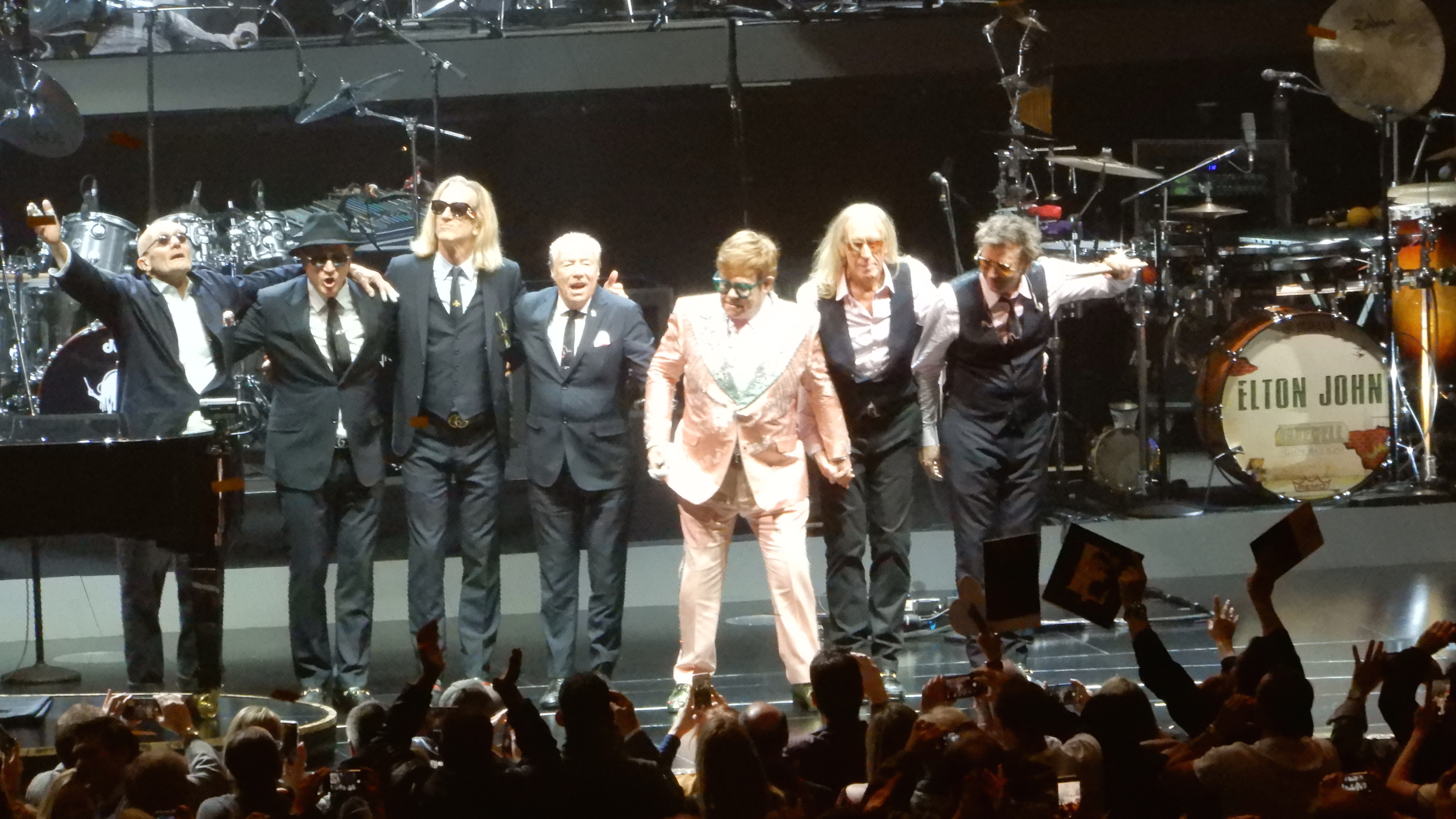
- The Elton John Band after performing in November 2018. From left to right: Ray Cooper, Matt Bissonette, Kim Bullard, Nigel Olsson, Elton John, Davey Johnstone, and John Mahon

Background information
- Years active: 1970–present
- Members: Elton John; Nigel Olsson; Davey Johnstone; Ray Cooper; John Mahon; Kim Bullard; Matt Bissonette
- Past members: Dee Murray; Tony Murray; Roger Pope; Caleb Quaye; David Hentschel; Kenny Passarelli; James Newton Howard; Tim Renwick; Richie Zito; Fred Mandel; Charlie Morgan; David Paton; Jody Linscott; Romeo Williams; Jonathan Moffett; Guy Babylon; Bob Birch; Andy Amthor; Jack Bruno; Táta Vega; Rose Stone; Lisa Stone; Jean Witherspoon; Luka Šulić; Stjepan Hauser; John Jorgenson
- Website: eltonjohn.com

The Elton John Band is the band that backs the British singer, songwriter and pianist Elton John on both studio and live recordings. The band has gone through several lineup changes, but Nigel Olsson, Davey Johnstone, and Ray Cooper have been members (albeit not continuously) since 1970, 1971 and 1973, respectively. The various lineups of the band have consisted of British, American, and European musicians. The band is often not recognised as a formal entity, and is instead referred to simply as the Elton John Band.

The band was originally formed by John in 1970 as a trio, consisting of himself, drummer Olsson, and bassist Dee Murray. They first appeared together on disc with John on the album Tumbleweed Connection, which was released that same year. Over the next few years, guitarist Davey Johnstone and percussionist Cooper also joined the band, forming the band's classic lineup. The critical success of the band was at its peak in the 1970s, when they released a streak of chart-topping albums in the US and UK, which began with Honky Château (1972) and culminated with Captain Fantastic and the Brown Dirt Cowboy (1975).

After the release of Captain Fantastic and the Brown Dirt Cowboy, John fired Murray and Olsson from the band and added several new musicians to the band's lineup, including Kenny Passarelli, Caleb Quaye, James Newton Howard, and Cindy Bullens, as John wanted to achieve a different sound. This lineup first appeared on disc on the 1975 album Rock of the Westies, but all left the band by either the late 1970s or early 1980s. Olsson rejoined the band in 1980 alongside Murray, who continued to perform with the band until his death in 1992. New musicians that joined the band around this time include Richie Zito, Tim Renwick, Fred Mandel, Charlie Morgan, David Paton, Helena Springs, Jody Linscott, Jonathan Moffett, and Guy Babylon. Of these musicians, Babylon remained a member of the band for the longest amount of the time, being in the group from 1988 until his death in 2009, whereas the other members left at some point before the end of the 1980s. John Mahon joined the band in 1997, and Kim Bullard and Matt Bissonette joined in 2009 and 2012, replacing Babylon and Bob Birch, respectively, which alongside John, Olsson, Johnstone, and Cooper, formed the current lineup of the band. Their most recent album is Wonderful Crazy Night, released in 2016.

Since the group's formation, John performed with his band over 4,000 times, beginning with the Elton John 1970 World Tour and concluding with the Farewell Yellow Brick Road tour, which began in 2018 and concluded in 2023. John and Cooper also toured outside of the band as a duo between 1977 and 2012.

== Career ==
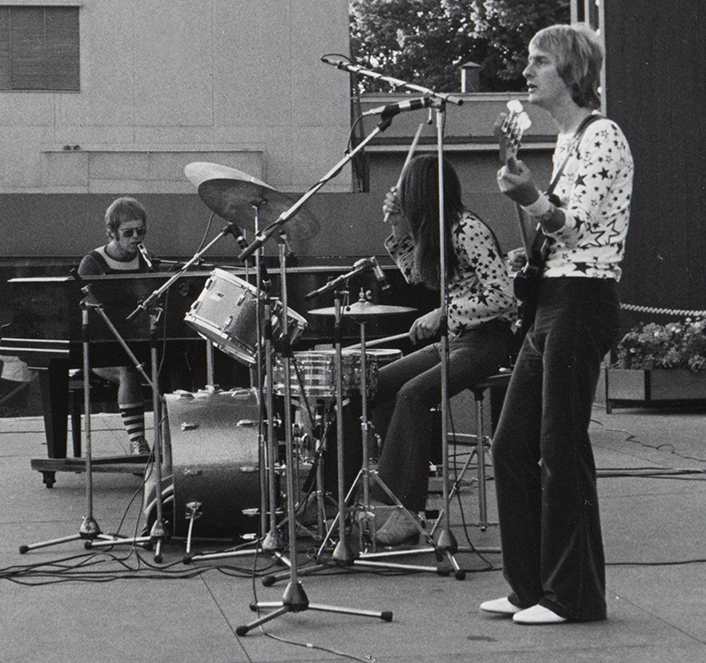
The Elton John Band in 1971, while still a trio. Left to right: Elton John, Nigel Olsson and Dee Murray

The Elton John Band was formed in 1970, and was initially a trio consisting of Elton John on piano and vocals, Dee Murray on bass and backing vocals, and Nigel Olsson on drums and backing vocals. Murray and Olsson first appeared together on disc with John on the song "Amoreena" from the 1970 studio album Tumbleweed Connection. The following year, they were featured on the live album 17-11-70.

Davey Johnstone, who had previously played on John's lyricist Bernie Taupin's 1971 solo album Taupin, first appeared on disc with John and his band on the 1971 album Madman Across the Water, after which he was invited to join the Elton John Band as a full member Also in 1971. Johnstone's debut album with John as a full-time member of his band was Honky Château, on which he played electric and acoustic guitars, slide guitar, banjo, and mandolin, and also sang backing vocals alongside Murray and Olsson. Ray Cooper began playing with the band as a percussionist in 1973, though he did not become a full-time member of the band until 2016. The arrival of he and Johnstone in the group formed the classic line-up of the band, which played on the albums Honky Château, Don't Shoot Me I'm Only the Piano Player, Goodbye Yellow Brick Road and Captain Fantastic and the Brown Dirt Cowboy, and went on several world tours.

In February 1975, the non-album single "Philadelphia Freedom" was credited to the Elton John Band, along with the single's B-side "I Saw Her Standing There" (recorded live with John Lennon at Madison Square Garden) and the band's 1974 cover of "Lucy in the Sky with Diamonds" (which also featured Lennon on backing vocals and guitar). After the release of Captain Fantastic and the Brown Dirt Cowboy, Murray and Olsson were released from the band because John wanted to achieve a different sound. He added several new musicians to the band's lineup, including Kenny Passarelli, Caleb Quaye, James Newton Howard, and Cindy Bullens, who first appeared together on disc with John on the album Rock of the Westies, but all left the band by either the late 1970s or early 1980s respectively. In 1979, John and Cooper toured Israel and the USSR as a duo, which proved successful. They also performed concerts together a total of 234 times in ten of the years between 1977 and 2012.

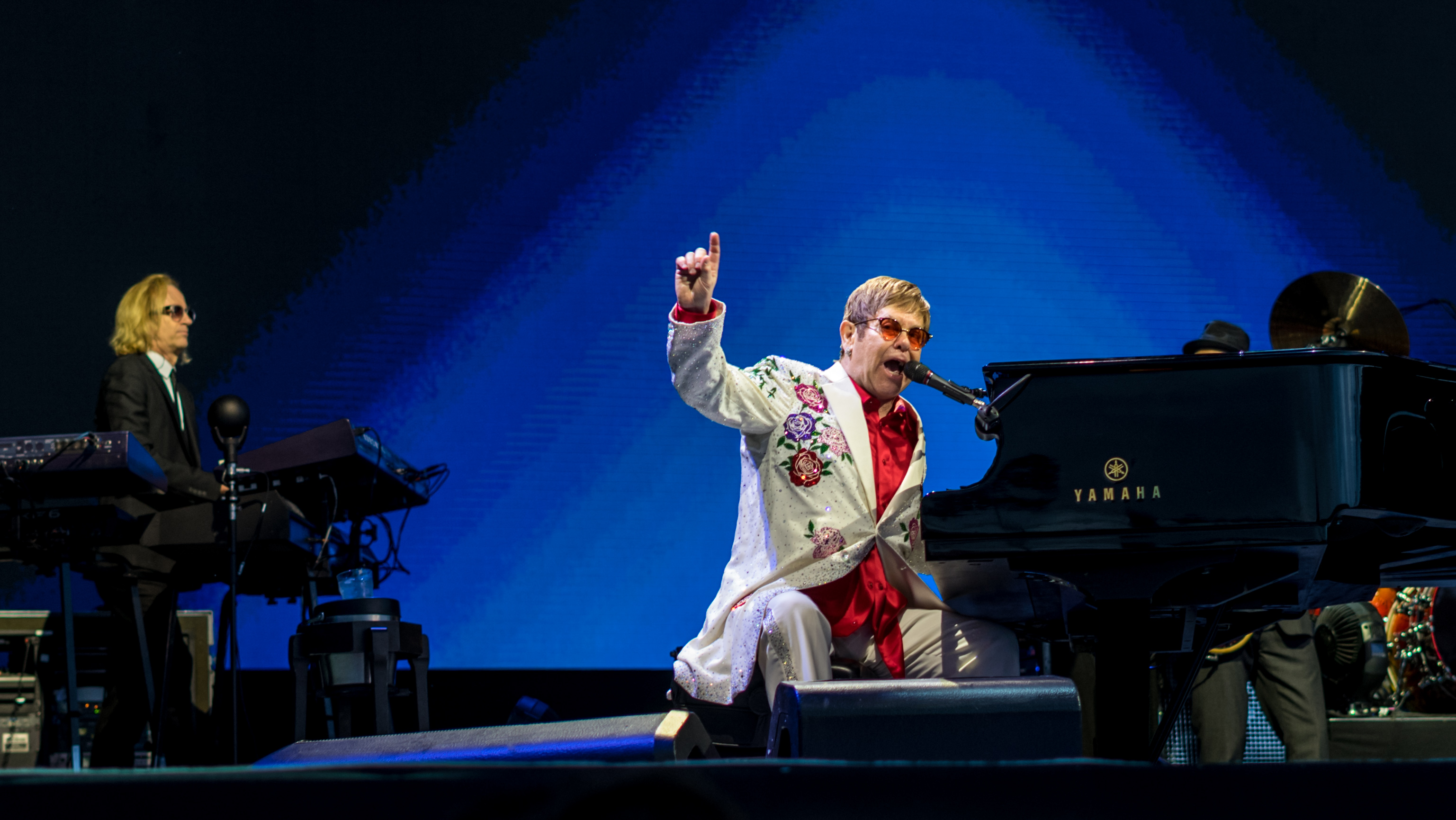
The Elton John Band performing in 2017 during the Wonderful Crazy Night Tour

Murray and Olsson rejoined the band in 1980, starting with 21 at 33. He and Olsson backed John during his landmark concert in New York City's Central Park before more than 400,000 fans on the Great Lawn on 13 September 1980, and appeared on The Fox in 1981. Murray went on to contribute all the bass tracks on Jump Up! in 1982, and joined Olsson and Johnstone for the Jump Up! Tour, followed by albums and tours for Too Low for Zero (1983) and Breaking Hearts (1984), and Reg Strikes Back (1988). New musicians that joined the band around this time include Richie Zito, Tim Renwick, Fred Mandel, Charlie Morgan, David Paton, Helena Springs, Jody Linscott, Jonathan Moffett, and Guy Babylon. Of these new musicians, Babylon remained a member of the band for the longest amount of the time, being in the group from 1988 until his death in 2009, whereas the other members left at some point before the end of the 1980s.

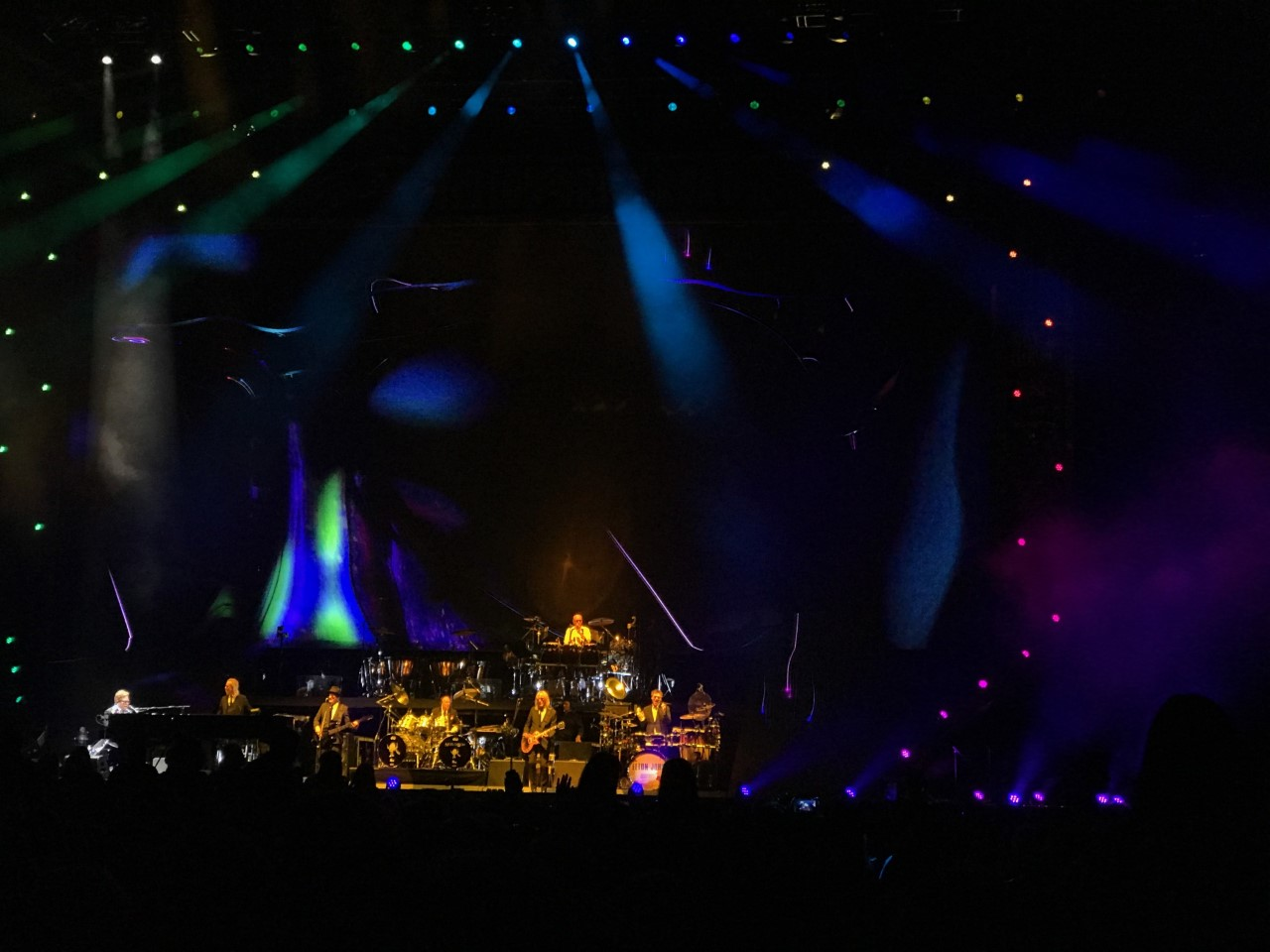
The Elton John Band performing in 2019 during the Farewell Yellow Brick Road tour

Murray died in 1992, having suffered a stroke after battling skin cancer for a number of years. According to Murray's obituary, that March, John and his band performed two tribute concerts at the Grand Ole Opry to raise money to support Murray's family. New musicians that joined the band in the 1990s included Bob Birch (who remained in the band until his death in 2012) and John Jorgenson (who left the band in 2000). John and his band toured with fellow singer, songwriter and pianist Billy Joel in 1994, 1995, 1998, 2001, 2002, 2003, 2009, and 2010 for the Face To Face tours. John Mahon joined the band in 1997, and Kim Bullard and Matt Bissonette joined the band in 2009 and 2012 respectively. John, Olsson, Johnstone and Cooper are the only members left from the band's classic lineup in the early 1970s. In 2016, this lineup of the band joined John for the Wonderful Crazy Night tour, and two years later for the Farewell Yellow Brick Road concert tour, which was John and his band's final tour consisting of more than 300 concerts worldwide.

By the end of the first leg of the tour on 18 March 2019, the Farewell Yellow Brick Road tour grossed over $125 million and won a Billboard Music Award in the category Top Rock Tour. The leg in Oceania became the highest-grossing tour of 2020, ending right before the tour was put on hiatus in 2020 and 2021 due to the COVID-19 pandemic. In January 2022, the tour had resumed and the dates for 2020 and 2021 were rescheduled to 2022 and 2023. It was also announced by Olsson that the members of the band would wear masks and have tests every two days during the tour. Two gigs in Dallas were postponed after John tested positive for COVID-19 and began experiencing mild symptoms from the disease. These Dallas gigs were resumed after John made a full recovery from the virus. John and his band toured across the UK and Europe (including gigs at Liverpool and Watford) throughout early 2022, and did three consecutive gigs at Dodger Stadium in late 2022. On 2 December 2022 John announced the final leg of the UK tour would be headlining Glastonbury festival in 2023, saying "There is no more fitting way to say goodbye to my British fans". The tour concluded following a performance at Stockholm on 8 July 2023, and became the highest-grossing concert tour of all time up to that point. John has said that he will now only perform in small venues.

== Members ==
=== Current members ===
- Elton John – lead vocals, piano (1968–present)
- Nigel Olsson – drums, backing vocals (1970–1975, 1980–1985, 2000–present)
- Davey Johnstone – lead guitar, musical director, backing vocals (1971–1979, 1982–present)
- Ray Cooper – percussion (1973–1979, 1985–1991, 1993–1995, 2009–present)
- John Mahon – percussion, backing vocals (1997–present)
- Kim Bullard – keyboards (2009–present)
- Matt Bissonette – bass guitar, backing vocals (2012–present)

=== Former members ===
- Caleb Quaye – guitar, backing vocals (1969–1971, 1975–1976)
- Roger Pope – drums, percussion (1969, 1975–1976, died 2013)
- Dee Murray – bass guitar, backing vocals (1970–1975, 1980–1985, 1988, died 1992)
- James Newton Howard – keyboards, backing vocals, conductor, orchestrations (1975–1981)
- Kenny Passarelli – bass guitar, backing vocals (1975–1976)
- Jeff Baxter – guitar (1975)
- Cidny Bullens – backing vocals (1975–1976)
- Jon Joyce – backing vocals (1975–1976)
- Ken Gold – backing vocals (1975–1976)
- Jo Partridge – guitar (1977)
- John "Cooker" LoPresti – bass guitar (1977, died 2011)
- Dennis Conway – drums (1977)
- Richie Zito – lead guitar, backing vocals (1980–1982)
- Tim Renwick – rhythm guitar, backing vocals (1980–1982)
- Fred Mandel – keyboards, rhythm guitar, backing vocals (1984–1990)
- Charlie Morgan – drums (1985–1999)
- David Paton – bass guitar, vocals (1985–1988, fill-in 1995)
- Alan Carvell – backing vocals (1985–1988)
- Helena Springs – backing vocals (1985–1988)
- Shirley Lewis – backing vocals (1985–1988)
- Jody Linscott – percussion (1986–1987)
- Romeo Williams – bass guitar (1988–1990, died 2017)
- Jonathan Moffett – drums (1988–1989)
- Guy Babylon – keyboards (1988–2009, his death)
- Marlena Jeter – backing vocals (1988–1993)
- Natalie Jackson – backing vocals (1988–1993)
- Alex Brown – backing vocals (1988)
- Mortonette Jenkins – backing vocals (1988–1993)
- Bob Birch – bass guitar, vocals (1992–2012, his death)
- Mark Taylor – keyboards, rhythm guitar, backing vocals (1992–1993)
- John Jorgenson – guitars, saxophone, pedal steel, mandolin, backing vocals (1994–2000, 2001, 2004, 2013, 2019)
- Billy Trudel – backing vocals (1997–2000)
- Jack Bruno – drums (1998–1999)
- Curt Bisquera – drums (2000)
- Ken Stacey – backing vocals, additional guitar (2000–2001, 2024)
- Tanya Balam – backing vocals (2010–2011)
- Táta Vega – backing vocals (2010–2014)
- Lisa Stone – backing vocals (2010–2014)
- Jean Witherspoon – backing vocals (2010–2014)
- Rose Stone – backing vocals (2011–2014)
- Luka Šulić – cello (2011–2014)
- Stjepan Hauser – cello (2011–2014)

== Discography ==
- Tumbleweed Connection (1970)
- 11-17-70 (1971)
- Friends (1971)
- Honky Château (1972)
- Don't Shoot Me I'm Only the Piano Player (1973)
- Goodbye Yellow Brick Road (1973)
- Caribou (1974)
- Captain Fantastic and the Brown Dirt Cowboy (1975)
- Rock of the Westies (1975)
- Blue Moves (1976)
- A Single Man (1978)
- 21 at 33 (1980)
- The Fox (1981)
- Jump Up! (1982)
- Too Low for Zero (1983)
- Breaking Hearts (1984)
- Ice on Fire (1985)
- Leather Jackets (1986)
- Reg Strikes Back (1988)
- Sleeping with the Past (1989)
- The One (1992)
- Made in England (1995)
- The Big Picture (1997)
- Songs from the West Coast (2001)
- Peachtree Road (2004)
- The Captain & the Kid (2006)
- Wonderful Crazy Night (2016)
