= List of concerts at Parken Stadium =

This is a list of the concerts or other musical events held at Parken Stadium in Copenhagen, Denmark.

(To sort the table by any column, click on the icon next to the column title.)

Date	Artist	Event	Attendance
21 August 1988	Prince	Lovesexy Tour	
25-26 August 1990	David Bowie	Sound+Vision Tour	95,000
5 September 1992	Gary Moore		
7 August 1993	Plácido Domingo		21,600
13 August 1993	Whitney Houston	The Bodyguard World Tour	34,600
25 August 1994	Pink Floyd	The Division Bell Tour	50,000
12 July 1995	Rod Stewart	A Spanner in the Works Tour	16,828
11 June 1995	The Rolling Stones	Voodoo Lounge Tour	48,000
21 June 1996	Tina Turner	Wildest Dreams Tour	40,000
17 June 1996	Bryan Adams	18 Til I Die Tour	18,000
22 June 1997	Celine Dion	Falling into You: Around the World	40,585
4 August 1997	U2	PopMart Tour	42,734
14 August 1997	Michael Jackson	HIStory World Tour	97,563
29 August 1997	Michael Jackson	HIStory World Tour	97,563
14 August 1998		Aida	12,288
2 June 1998	Eros Ramazzotti		18,079
22 June 1998	Elton John	Face to Face 1998	35,065
22 June 1998	Billy Joel	Face to Face 1998	35,065
29 July 1998	The Rolling Stones	Bridges to Babylon Tour	48,657
26 June 1999	Bruce Springsteen and the E Street Band	Bruce Springsteen and the E Street Band Reunion Tour	47,000
3 August 2000	Tina Turner	Twenty Four Seven Tour	46,901
11 May 2001		Eurovision Song Contest 2001, first dress rehearsal	35,000
12 May 2001		Eurovision Song Contest 2001, second dress rehearsal and grand final	20,000 / 38,000
21 August 2001	Red Hot Chili Peppers	2001 Tour	15,000
23 September 2001	Depeche Mode	Exciter Tour	35,000
31 May 2002	Elton John	Songs from the West Coast Tour	32,000
16 May 2002	Santana	All is One Tour	18,000
26 October 2002		Les Misérables	30,000
2 May 2003	Paul McCartney	Back in the World Tour	46,600
13 July 2003	The Rolling Stones	Licks Tour	45,000
25 July 2003	Robbie Williams	Weekends of Mass Distraction, Cock of Justice, Aussie Typo	46,000
14 June 2003	Bruce Springsteen and the E Street Band	The Rising Tour	46,000
17 April 2004	Eric Clapton		23,111
7 May 2004		Rock'n'Royal, an event commemorating Frederik, Crown Prince of Denmark's wedding	40,000
26 May 2004	Metallica	Madly in Anger with the World Tour	
19 June 2004		Zulu Rocks, a multi-artist concert hosted by TV 2 Zulu	
23 July 2004	Simon & Garfunkel		30,000
2 April 2005		Once Upon a Time, Jean Michel Jarre's musical tribute to Hans Christian Andersen	35,000
18 June 2005		Zulu Rocks	30,000
31 July 2005	U2	Vertigo Tour	50,000
15 October 2005		Zulu Rocks	
25 February 2006	Depeche Mode	Touring the Angel	48,000
17 June 2006		Zulu Rocks	30,000
6-7 July 2006	Robbie Williams	Close Encounters Tour	96,000
28 October 2006	Bruce Springsteen and the E Street Band	Bruce Springsteen with the Seeger Sessions Band Tour	
11 November 2006	George Michael	25 Live	49,000
16 June 2007		Zulu Rocks	30,000
23 June 2007	Justin Timberlake	FutureSex/LoveShow	55,000
5 August 2007	The Rolling Stones	A Bigger Bang Tour	
10 November 2007	Tiësto	Elements of Life World Tour	55,550
5 June 2008	Celine Dion	Taking Chances World Tour	40,000
29 June 2008	Bruce Springsteen and the E Street Band	Magic Tour	45,929
30 August 2008	George Michael	25 Live	55,000
6 September 2008	R.E.M.	Accelerate Tour	
15 November 2008		Sensation	27,000
29 November 2008	Elton John		
19 June 2009	AC/DC	Black Ice World Tour	45,000
30 June 2009	Depeche Mode	Tour of the Universe	41,564
11 July 2009	Britney Spears	The Circus Starring Britney Spears	40,000
11 August 2009	Madonna	Sticky & Sweet Tour	48,064
15 July 2009	Take That	Progress Live	
26 October 2009	Muse	The Resistance Tour	
29 October 2011		Sensation Innerspace	
2 July 2012	Madonna	The MDNA Tour	29,416
28 August 2012	Coldplay	Mylo Xyloto Tour	50,595
2 September 2012	Lady Gaga	Born This Way Ball	27,819
14 May 2013	Bruce Springsteen and the E Street Band	Wrecking Ball World Tour	49,017
13 June 2013	Depeche Mode	The Delta Machine Tour	40,725
22 July 2013	Robbie Williams	Take the Crown Stadium Tour	
23 July 2013	Robbie Williams	Take the Crown Stadium Tour	
16 June 2014	One Direction	Where We Are Tour	83,577
17 July 2014	One Direction	Where We Are Tour	83,577
22 June 2016	Bruce Springsteen and the E Street Band	The River Tour	50,178
5-6 July 2016	Coldplay	A Head Full of Dreams Tour	96,511
24 July 2016	Beyoncé	The Formation World Tour	45,197
2 October 2016	Justin Bieber	Purpose World Tour	51,080
31 May 2017	Depeche Mode	Global Spirit Tour	42,023
27 June 2017	Guns N' Roses	Not in This Lifetime... Tour	48,094
7 August 2017	Robbie Williams	The Heavy Entertainment Show Tour	
26 August 2017	Volbeat	Seal the Deal & Let's Boogie Tour	48,250
3 October 2017	The Rolling Stones	No Filter Tour	47,002
23 June 2018	Beyoncé Jay-Z	On the Run II Tour	45,356
19 June 2019	Rammstein	Rammstein Stadium Tour	44,396
11 July 2019	Metallica	WorldWired Tour	44,944
11 September 2021	The Minds of 99		50,000
27 June 2023	Depeche Mode	Memento Mori World Tour	47,000
5-6 July 2023	Coldplay	Music of the Spheres World Tour	98,646
14 June 2024	Metallica	M72 World Tour	86,235
16 June 2024	Metallica	M72 World Tour	86,235
21 June 2024	The Minds of 99		147,000
22 June 2024	The Minds of 99		147,000
23 June 2024	The Minds of 99		147,000
6 July 2024	Pink	Pink Summer Carnival	
19 June 2025	Robbie Williams	Robbie Williams Live 2025	
