= Kapcsolat concert =

"Kapcsolat" concert
- Genre: various
- Dates: around June 30
- Locations: Ötvenhatosok tere, Budapest
- Years active: 1997–2011
- Organizer: Westel/T-Mobile, Magyar Telekom

"Kapcsolat" concert (Hungarian pronunciation: [ˈkɒpt͡ʃolɒt]; English: connection) was an annual open-air free concert event between 1997 and 2011 in Budapest, Hungary. It was organized by the T-Mobile branch of Magyar Telekom on Ötvenhatosok tere. The open-air concert was considered to be one of the largest in Europe.

The name of the concert was borrowed from the motto of the mobile network operator Westel: "Westel, a Kapcsolat!" (English: "Westel, the Connection!"), while its approximate date from the telephone prefix of the operator (06-30, also dubbed "kapcsolat napja", English: Day of Connection). The concert was free and paid for from sponsorships. It attracted hundreds of thousand concert-goers. Tickets were only given to VIP guests and employees of Magyar Telekom to VIP sectors.

The first concert was organized in 1996, however, the name "Kapcsolat" was used only from 1997. It was held annually until 2011. In 2012, new telecommunication taxes were introduced, and the concert was called off due to budgetary reasons.

== Events ==
	Date	Featured act(s)	Tour	Opening act(s)	Sponsors
0	1996	Santana	—N/a	—N/a	MOL Rt.; Volkswagen; Coca-Cola; Dreher
1	1997	No Mercy	—N/a	Zorán; Charlie; Hip Hop Boyz; Ferenc Demjén; Kozmix; Cserháti Zsuzsa; Kispál és a Borz; V.I.P.	—N/a
2	June 28, 1998	Modern Talking	Back for Good Tour	Charlie; Ákos; Bestiák; Ámokfutók; Zorán; Republic	—N/a
3	1999	Locomotiv GT	—N/a	Roy & Ádám; Péter Gerendás; Jazz+Az; Zorán; Tamás Hevesi; Unisex	RTL Klub; Népszabadság; Nokia; Sláger Rádió
4	July 2, 2000	Pet Shop Boys	Summer Tour	Andrea Szulák; Unisex; Venus; United; Roy & Ádám	RTL Klub; Sláger Rádió; Blikk; Pesti Est; Shell; Coca-Cola; Borsod Brewery; Volkswagen; Budapesti Fesztiválközpont
5	July 1, 2001	Kool & the Gang; Melanie C	—N/a	Roy & Ádám; Venus; United; Kispál és a Borz	TV2; Sláger Rádió; Pesti Est; Est Fm; Coca-Cola; Volkswagen; Budapesti Fesztiválközpont
6	June 30, 2002	Joe Cocker	—N/a	Dannii Minogue; Bon Bon; Sub Bass Monster; Zanzibar; Old Boys; Eszter Váczi	Siemens Mobile; RTL Klub; Sláger Rádió; Pesti Est; Coca-Cola; Dreher; Volkswagen
7	June 22, 2003	Elton John	2003 Tour	Charlie	Siemens Mobile; MOL; Volkswagen; Dreher; Coca-Cola; RTL Klub; Sláger Rádió; Pesti Est
8	June 5, 2004	Sting	Sacred Love tour	Suzanne Vega; Elsa Walle; Charlie; Adrienn Zsédenyi; Eszter Váczi; Tamás Somló; András Hajós; Barna Pély; Emilio; Péter Geszti; Veronika Tóth; Ibolya Oláh; Budapest Jazz Orchestra	MOL; Volkswagen; Dreher; Coca-Cola; RTL Klub; Danubius Rádió; Pesti Est; Metro
9	June 26, 2005	Lionel Richie	—N/a	Jimmy Cliff; Tamás Palcsó; Caramel	Heineken; Coca-Cola light; Volkswagen; Danubius Rádió; Metro; RTL Klub; Pesti Est
10	June 18, 2006	Pink	I'm Not Dead Tour	The Tarantinos; NOX	Samsung; MKB Bank; Volkswagen; Danubius Rádió; Metro; Magyar Televízió; Pesti Est
11	June 30, 2007	Bryan Adams	—N/a	Magdolna Rúzsa	Sony Ericsson; MKB Bank; Volkswagen; Danubius Rádió; Pesti Est; Metro; TV2
12	June 28, 2008	Santana	2008 Live Your Light; European Tour	Back II Black	Sony Ericsson; MKB Bank; Volkswagen; [origo]; Danubius Rádió; Est.TV Magazin; Metro; TV2; Story; Best; PORT.hu
13	June 27, 2009	Simply Red	Farewell Tour	Viktor Király	Sony Ericsson; TV2; Danubius Rádió; EXIT magazin; Metropol; Pesti Est; [origo]; PORT.hu
14	June 26, 2010	Rod Stewart	Soulbook Tour	Ibolya Oláh; László Gáspár; Gabriella Tóth; Caramel; Viktor Király	Sony Ericsson; TV2; Class FM; Metropol; Best; Exit; Sony Music; Life Network
15	June 25, 2011	Kesha	Get Sleazy Tour	Attila László; Krizbai Teca; Gomes; Appril Project; Ádám Szabó; Zoli Ádok; István Tabáni; Viktor Varga	Sony Ericsson; Metropol; Class FM; [origo]; Life Network; Story; Best; Meglepetés; Színes RTV; Maxima; Sony Music; Exit; Hungarofest
