= Songs from the West Coast Tour =

2001–02 concert tour by Elton John

- Tour by Elton John
- Poster to the concert in Bangkok, Thailand
- Location: Asia • Europe • North America
- Associated album: Songs from the West Coast
- Start date: 5 October 2001
- End date: 15 December 2002
- Legs: 7
- No. of shows: 70

Elton John concert chronology
- 2001 Solo Tour (2001); Songs from the West Coast Tour (2001–02); Face to Face 2002 (2002)

The Songs from the West Coast Tour was a concert tour by Elton John that took place between 2001 and 2002 to promote John's latest album at that time, Songs from the West Coast.

The 2001 leg visited Canada, the United States, Mexico and Japan. It was the first time John had visited Japan since 1998 Face to Face. It was also the first time John visited Mexico since the One Tour in 1992.

It was the first tour for Nigel Olsson to play drums for the Elton John Band since 1984's Breaking Hearts Tour.

The tour continued in 2002 after Face to Face 2002 and a tour of Australia. The tour started in Benidorm, Spain and came to a close in Birmingham, England on 15 December.

== Set list ==
Standard 2001 set list
1. "Funeral for a Friend/Love Lies Bleeding"
2. "Someone Saved My Life Tonight"
3. "Bennie and the Jets"
4. "Philadelphia Freedom"
5. "Ballad of the Boy in the Red Shoes"
6. "The Wasteland"
7. "Rocket Man"
8. "Daniel"
9. "Roy Rogers"
10. "Mansfield"
11. "(Gotta Get A) Meal Ticket"
12. "I Want Love"
13. "Birds"
14. "Country Comfort"
15. "Take Me to the Pilot"
16. "Mona Lisas and Mad Hatters"
17. "Holiday Inn"
18. "American Triangle"
19. "Original Sin"
20. "Levon"
21. "I'm Still Standing"
22. "The Bitch Is Back"
23. "Saturday Night's Alright for Fighting"
24. "Believe"
25. "Crocodile Rock"
26. "Your Song"
27. "Don't Let the Sun Go Down on Me"
Standard 2002 set list
1. "Funeral for a Friend/Love Lies Bleeding"
2. "Bennie and the Jets"
3. "Daniel"
4. "Someone Saved My Life Tonight"
5. "Ballad of the Boy in the Red Shoes"
6. "Philadelphia Freedom"
7. "The Wasteland"
8. "Rocket Man"
9. "I Guess That's Why They Call It the Blues"
10. "I Want Love"
11. "This Train Don't Stop There Anymore"
12. "Take Me to the Pilot"
13. "Sacrifice"
14. "Sorry Seems to Be the Hardest Word"
15. "Oh My Sweet Carolina" (Ryan Adams cover)
16. "American Triangle"
17. "Have Mercy on the Criminal"
18. "Holiday Inn"
19. "Tiny Dancer"
20. "Original Sin"
21. "I'm Still Standing"
22. "Crocodile Rock"
23. "Pinball Wizard"
24. "Don't Let the Sun Go Down on Me"
25. "Your Song"

== Tour dates ==
Date	City	Country	Venue
North America
5 October 2001	Cleveland	United States	CSU Convocation Center
6 October 2001	Toronto	Canada	Air Canada Centre
9 October 2001	Ottawa	Canada	Corel Centre
10 October 2001	Quebec City	Canada	Colisée Pepsi
12 October 2001	Columbus	United States	Jerome Schottenstein Center
13 October 2001	Detroit	United States	Joe Louis Arena
22 October 2001	Mexico City	Mexico	National Auditorium
23 October 2001	Mexico City	Mexico	National Auditorium
25 October 2001	Mexico City	Mexico	National Auditorium
Asia
12 November 2001	Osaka	Japan	Osaka-jō Hall
13 November 2001	Tokyo	Japan	Nippon Budokan
15 November 2001	Tokyo	Japan	Nippon Budokan
17 November 2001	Hong Kong	China	Hong Kong Coliseum
18 November 2001	Hong Kong	China	Hong Kong Coliseum
20 November 2001	Hong Kong	China	Hong Kong Coliseum
22 November 2001	Singapore		Singapore Indoor Stadium
23 November 2001	Bangkok	Thailand	Hua Mark Indoor Stadium
North America
27 November 2001	New York City	United States	Madison Square Garden
28 November 2001	New York City	United States	Madison Square Garden
30 November 2001	Manchester	United States	Verizon Wireless Arena
7 December 2001	Fresno	United States	Selland Arena
8 December 2001	Paradise	United States	MGM Grand Garden Arena
9 December 2001	San Diego	United States	Cox Arena
Europe
22 May 2002	Benidorm	Spain	Benidorm Football Stadium
25 May 2002	Verona	Italy	Verona Arena
26 May 2002	Pesaro	Italy	Palazzetto dello Sport
28 May 2002	Paris	France	Palais Omnisports de Paris-Bercy
29 May 2002	Antwerp	Belgium	Sportpaleis
31 May 2002	Copenhagen	Denmark	Parken Stadium
1 June 2002	Oslo	Norway	Oslo Spektrum
2 June 2002	Oslo	Norway	Oslo Spektrum
4 June 2002	Helsinki	Finland	Hartwall Areena
5 June 2002	Helsinki	Finland	Hartwall Areena
7 June 2002	Gothenburg	Sweden	Scandinavium
8 June 2002	Stockholm	Sweden	Globen Arena
10 June 2002	Frankfurt	Germany	Festhalle Frankfurt
11 June 2002	Rotterdam	Netherlands	Ahoy Arena
13 June 2002	Kiel	Germany	Ostseehalle
14 June 2002	Berlin	Germany	Max-Schmeling-Halle
15 June 2002	Erfurt	Germany	Messehalle
20 June 2002	Düsseldorf	Germany	Messe Düsseldorf
22 June 2002	Stuttgart	Germany	Hanns-Martin-Schleyer-Halle
23 June 2002	Munich	Germany	Olympiahalle
25 June 2002	Vienna	Austria	Schloss Schunn Palace
26 June 2002	Riesa	Germany	Sachsen Arena
29 June 2002	Zürich	Switzerland	Hallenstadion
30 June 2002	Zürich	Switzerland	Hallenstadion
2 July 2002	Birmingham	England	National Exhibition Centre
3 July 2002	Birmingham	England	National Exhibition Centre
5 July 2002	Newcastle	England	Telewest Arena
7 July 2002	Killarney	Ireland	Fitzgerald Stadium
9 July 2002	Liverpool	England	King's Dock
North America
5 September 2002	Richmond	United States	Richmond Coliseum
6 September 2002	Roanoke	United States	Roanoke Civic Center
7 September 2002	Greenville	United States	BI-LO Center
10 September 2002	Biloxi	United States	Coast Coliseum
12 September 2002	Jacksonville	United States	Jacksonville Coliseum
Europe
26 November 2002	Nottingham	England	Nottingham Arena
3 December 2002	Manchester	England	Manchester Evening News Arena
5 December 2002	Belfast	Northern Ireland	Odyssey Arena
7 December 2002	Glasgow	Scotland	Scottish Exhibition and Conference Centre
8 December 2002	Glasgow	Scotland	Scottish Exhibition and Conference Centre
9 December 2002	Sheffield	England	Sheffield Arena
11 December 2002	London	England	Wembley Arena
12 December 2002	London	England	Wembley Arena
13 December 2002	London	England	Wembley Arena
15 December 2002	Birmingham	England	National Exhibition Centre
