= Electricity (Elton John song) =

2005 song by Elton John

Single by Elton John

from the album Peachtree Road and Billy Elliot the Musical
- Released: 11 July 2005
- Length: 3:32
- Label: Rocket; Mercury
- Composer: Elton John
- Lyricist: Lee Hall
- Producer: Elton John

Elton John singles chronology
"Turn the Lights Out When You Leave" (2005)	"Electricity" (2005)	"Dreamland" (2005)

"Electricity" is a song written by British musician Elton John and lyricist Lee Hall for Billy Elliot the Musical. Released on 11 July 2005, it became John's 63rd UK top-40 hit, peaking at number four on the UK singles chart. Discounting any re-releases, it is his most recent solo top-40 hit in the UK. The song was included as a bonus track on the UK reissue of John's album Peachtree Road.

== Background ==
The song is sung by Billy Elliot in the stage production at his audition for a place at The Royal Ballet School in London. Billy is asked "What does it feel like, when you are dancing?" by one of the panel. Billy responds, hesitantly at first, "I can't really explain it... I haven't got the words..." And then (see full lyrics) the music takes hold, and he goes into an energetic song, describing dancing as "Something that you can't control". After two verses, each with a chorus, Billy leaps into a frenetic dance; in this dance, many skills such as acrobatics are used (the rhythm for this section of the instrumental varies from Billy to Billy, depending on each actor's dance strengths). The number concludes with another verse and Billy doing several pirouettes or tumbles.

A notable lyric in this piece is that of the title: 'Electricity sparks inside of me and I'm free, I'm free!" It was inspired by the scene in the film, which it follows closely, in which Billy describes dancing as "Electricity". His passion, shown in his description, is the implied reason for Billy's acceptance into The Royal Ballet School.

== Track listings ==
UK CD single

1. "Electricity" – 3:30
2. "Indian Sunset" (edit) – 6:25

UK maxi-CD single

1. "Electricity" – 3:30
2. "Electricity" (orchestral version) – 3:52
3. "Your Song" (live '04) – 4:26
4. "Your Song" (live '04 video)

UK 7-inch single

1. "Electricity" – 3:30
2. "Bite Your Lip (Get Up and Dance!)" (live '04) – 4:57
- Includes lyric sheet and poster

== Charts ==
Chart (2005)	Peak position
Europe (Eurochart Hot 100)	13
Ireland (IRMA)	31
Scotland Singles (Official Charts)	17
UK Singles (Official Charts)	4

Chart (2009)	Peak position
US Adult Contemporary (Billboard)	17
