= Peachtree Road Tour =

2004–05 concert tour by Elton John

- Tour by Elton John
- Poster to the concert in Hamburg, Germany
- Location: Europe • North America
- Associated album: Peachtree Road
- Start date: 4 November 2004
- End date: 14 December 2005
- Legs: 6
- No. of shows: 81

Elton John concert chronology
- 2004 Tour (2004); Peachtree Road Tour (2004–05); 2006 European Tour (2006)

The Peachtree Road Tour was a concert tour by Elton John. The tour started in on 4 November 2004 with the album launch in Atlanta. The tour was to promote John's album Peachtree Road. The tour moved on to Europe for two dates at the end of the year. The following year, 2005, John toured in promotion with the album in North America before returning tour Europe once again. The tour came to an end on 14 December 2005 in Zürich, Switzerland.

On the European tour John and his band performed several very large-scale concerts at Reading, Southampton, Norwich, Huddersfield, Stoke-on-Trent, Coventry, Watford and Dublin.

== Set list ==
Standard US set list
1. "Weight of the World"
2. "Porch Swing in Tupelo"
3. "Answer in the Sky"
4. "Turn the Light Out When You Leave"
5. "My Elusive Drug"
6. "They Call Her the Cat"
7. "Freaks in Love"
8. "All That I'm Allowed"
9. "Bennie and the Jets"
10. "Daniel"
11. "Take Me to the Pilot"
12. "Rocket Man"
13. "I Guess That's Why They Call It the Blues"
14. "Tiny Dancer"
15. "Sorry Seems to Be the Hardest Word"
16. "Funeral for a Friend/Love Lies Bleeding"
17. "Philadelphia Freedom"
18. "Sad Songs (Say So Much)"
19. "Levon"
20. "Don't Let the Sun Go Down on Me"
21. "I'm Still Standing"
22. "The Bitch Is Back"
23. "Bite Your Lip (Get Up and Dance!)"
24. "Saturday Night's Alright for Fighting"
25. "Your Song"
Standard European set list
1. "Pinball Wizard"
2. "Bennie and the Jets"
3. "Daniel"
4. "Turn the Lights Out When You Leave"
5. "Take Me to the Pilot"
6. "Rocket Man"
7. "I Guess That's Why They Call It the Blues"
8. "Sacrifice"
9. "Electricity"
10. "Sorry Seems to Be the Hardest Word"
11. "Funeral for a Friend/Love Lies Bleeding"
12. "Are You Ready for Love"
13. "Philadelphia Freedom"
14. "All That I'm Allowed"
15. "Porch Swing in Tupelo"
16. "They Call Her the Cat"
17. "Sad Songs (Say So Much)"
18. "Levon"
19. "Don't Let the Sun Go Down on Me"
20. "I'm Still Standing"
21. "The Bitch Is Back"
22. "Saturday Night's Alright for Fighting"
23. "Candle in the Wind"
24. "Your Song"
Standard European set list (fall 2005)
1. "Funeral for a Friend/Love Lies Bleeding"
2. "Bennie and the Jets"
3. "Daniel"
4. "Turn the Lights Out When You Leave"
5. "Take Me to the Pilot"
6. "Rocket Man"
7. "I Guess That's Why They Call It the Blues"
8. "Blessed"
9. "The One"
10. "Mona Lisas and Mad Hatters"
11. "Sacrifice"
12. "Sorry Seems to Be the Hardest Word"
13. "Tiny Dancer"
14. "Philadelphia Freedom"
15. "Sad Songs (Say So Much)"
16. "They Call Her the Cat"
17. "Don't Let the Sun Go Down on Me"
18. "I'm Still Standing"
19. "The Bitch Is Back"
20. "Saturday Night's Alright for Fighting"
21. "Crocodile Rock"
22. "Your Song"

== Tour dates ==
Date	City	Country	Venue	Tickets sold / available	Revenue
North America
4 November 2004	Atlanta	United States	The Tabernacle		
5 November 2004	Atlanta	United States	The Tabernacle		
Europe
7 December 2004	Newcastle	England	Metro Radio Arena		
9 December 2004	Sheffield	England	Hallam FM Arena		
13 December 2004	London	England	Hammersmith Apollo		
16 December 2004	London	England	Hammersmith Apollo		
17 December 2004	London	England	Hammersmith Apollo		
18 December 2004	London	England	Hammersmith Apollo		
North America
18 March 2005	Sunrise	United States	Office Depot Center	15,979 / 15,979	$1,170,085
19 March 2005	Orlando	United States	TD Waterhouse Centre	13,702 / 13,702	$795,050
23 March 2005	Oklahoma City	United States	Ford Center	14,027 / 19,420	$1,060,150
24 March 2005	Dallas	United States	American Airlines Center	17,595 / 17,595	$1,112,330
26 March 2005	Houston	United States	Toyota Center	15,926 / 15,926	$1,060,150
22 April 2005	Milwaukee	United States	Bradley Center		
23 April 2005	Rosemont	United States	Allstate Arena	15,434 / 15,434	$1,338,300
24 April 2005	Auburn Hills	United States	The Palace of Auburn Hills	18,278 / 18,278	$1,367,863
28 April 2005	Kansas City	United States	Kemper Arena	15,516 / 15,516	$1,002,390
29 April 2005	Minneapolis	United States	Target Center	14,613 / 14,613	$1,081,125
3 May 2005	Denver	United States	Pepsi Center	14,015 / 14,015	$1,231,627
5 May 2005	Glendale	United States	Glendale Arena	14,824 / 14,824	$1,243,230
6 May 2005	San Diego	United States	Cox Arena	10,485 / 10,485	$847,424
7 May 2005	Anaheim	United States	Arrowhead Pond	13,359 / 13,359	$1,227,560
Europe
24 May 2005	Paris	France	Palais Omnisports de Paris-Bercy		
26 May 2005	Reading	England	Madejski Stadium	20,764 / 20,764	$1,902,692
28 May 2005	Southampton	England	St Mary's Stadium	25,925 / 25,925	$2,432,630
29 May 2005	Norwich	England	Carrow Road	21,903 / 21,903	$2,047,579
1 June 2005	Bratislava	Slovakia	Tyrsovo Nabrezie		
3 June 2005	Huddersfield	England	Galpharm Stadium		
4 June 2005	Stoke-on-Trent	England	Britannia Stadium		
5 June 2005	Bolton	England	Reebok Stadium		
8 June 2005	Oslo	Norway	Oslo Spektrum		
10 June 2005	Nottingham	England	National Ice Centre		
11 June 2005	Coventry	England	Highfield Road		
12 June 2005	Glasgow	Scotland	Scottish Exhibition and Conference Centre		
14 June 2005	Cardiff	Wales	Cardiff International Arena		
15 June 2005	Cardiff	Wales	Cardiff International Arena		
16 June 2005	Peterborough	England	The Embankment		
18 June 2005	Watford	England	Vicarage Road	23,450 / 23,450	$2,938,980
19 June 2005	Swindon	England	County Ground		
25 June 2005	Edinburgh	Scotland	Easter Road Stadium		
26 June 2005	Kilmarnock	Scotland	Rugby Park		
29 June 2005	Marbella	Spain	Mijas Costa Hipodrome		
30 June 2005	Guadalajara	Spain	Municipal Football Stadium		
2 July 2005	Dublin	Ireland	RDS Arena	27,563 / 30,000	$2,098,608
7 July 2005	Bonn	Germany	Museumsplatz		
9 July 2005	Aarhus	Germany	Aarhus Stadion		
10 July 2005	Bielefeld	Germany	Schuco Arena		
12 July 2005	Perugia	Italy	Jazz Arena		
13 July 2005	Bergamo	Italy	Stadio Atleti Azzurri d'Italia		
1 September 2005	Bergamo	Italy	Stadio Atleti Azzurri d'Italia		
3 September 2005	Rome	Italy	Colosseum		
North America
6 September 2005	Toronto	Canada	Air Canada Centre	33,935 / 33,935	$3,061,428
7 September 2005	Toronto	Canada	Air Canada Centre	33,935 / 33,935	$3,061,428
9 September 2005	Philadelphia	United States	Wachovia Center	15,616 / 15,616	$1,442,995
10 September 2005	Washington, D.C.	United States	MCI Center	16,459 / 16,459	$1,429,790
16 September 2005	Boston	United States	TD Banknorth Garden	31,164 / 31,164	$2,648,935
17 September 2005	Boston	United States	TD Banknorth Garden	31,164 / 31,164	$2,648,935
21 September 2005	New York City	United States	Madison Square Garden	46,708 / 46,708	$4,123,815
23 September 2005	New York City	United States	Madison Square Garden	46,708 / 46,708	$4,123,815
24 September 2005	New York City	United States	Madison Square Garden	46,708 / 46,708	$4,123,815
30 September 2005	Nashville	United States	Gaylord Entertainment Center		
1 October 2005	Atlanta	United States	Philips Arena	15,605 / 15,605	$1,335,525
4 November 2005	Memphis	United States	FedExForum	13,314 / 13,314	$844,833
5 November 2005	Cincinnati	United States	U.S. Bank Arena	12,398 / 17,000	$734,565
8 November 2005	Richmond	United States	Richmond Coliseum	11,214 / 11,214	$679,810
9 November 2005	Winston-Salem	United States	LJVM Coliseum	11,755 / 11,755	$497,756
12 November 2005	Charlotte	United States	Bobcats Arena	14,600 / 14,600	$774,295
16 November 2005	Columbia	United States	Colonial Center	12,404 / 12,404	$522,466
18 November 2005	Columbus	United States	Nationwide Arena	16,567 / 16,567	$969,065
19 November 2005	Indianapolis	United States	Conseco Fieldhouse		
Europe
29 November 2005	Helsinki	Finland	Hartwall Areena		
30 November 2005	Turku	Finland	Elysée Arena		
2 December 2005	Stockholm	Sweden	Globen Arena		
3 December 2005	Gothenburg	Sweden	Scandinavium		
5 December 2005	Hamburg	Germany	Color Line Arena		
8 December 2005	Stuttgart	Germany	Schleyerhalle		
12 December 2005	Antwerp	Belgium	Sportpaleis		
14 December 2005	Zürich	Switzerland	Hallenstadion		

Cancellations and rescheduled shows

10 December 2004	Nottingham, England	National Ice Centre	Rescheduled to 10 June 2005
12 December 2004	Glasgow, Scotland	Scottish Exhibition and Conference Centre	Rescheduled to 12 June 2005
4 March 2005	Bossier City, Louisiana	CenturyTel Center	Cancelled
5 March 2005	New Orleans	New Orleans Arena	Cancelled
8 March 2005	Richmond, Virginia	Richmond Coliseum	Cancelled
9 March 2005	Winston-Salem, North Carolina	Lawrence Joel Veterans Memorial Coliseum	Cancelled
11 March 2005	Columbus, Ohio	Nationwide Arena	Cancelled
12 March 2005	Indianapolis	Conseco Fieldhouse	Cancelled
14 March 2005	Columbia, South Carolina	Colonial Center	Cancelled
20 March 2005	Gainesville, Florida	O'Connell Center	Cancelled
6 December 2005	Oberhausen	König Pilsener Arena	Postponed to 1 June 2006
9 December 2005	Mannheim	SAP Arena	Postponed to 31 May 2006
