= Elton John 2006 European Tour =

2006 concert tour by Elton John

- Continental tour by Elton John
- Poster to the concert in Dorset, UK
- Location: Europe
- Start date: 28 May 2006
- End date: 2 September 2006
- No. of shows: 19

Elton John concert chronology
- Peachtree Road Tour (2004–05); 2006 European Tour (2006); The Captain and the Kid Tour (2006–08)

The 2006 European Tour was a concert tour by Elton John. After completing a string of dates in Las Vegas with the Red Piano shows John and the band travelled tour Europe.

== Overview ==
The tour only visited four European countries: Ireland, England, Germany and France. The majority of the seventeen concerts were performed in England.

John later returned to Europe after performing more Red Piano concerts. John and the band visited Lithuania and Poland.

== Set list ==
1. "Bennie and the Jets"
2. "Philadelphia Freedom"
3. "Believe"
4. "Daniel"
5. "Rocket Man"
6. "I Guess That's Why They Call It the Blues"
7. "Weight of the World"
8. "They Call Her the Cat"
9. "Turn Out the Lights Out When You Leave"
10. "The One"
11. "Take Me to the Pilot"
12. "Funeral for a Friend/Love Lies Bleeding"
13. "Someone Saved My Life Tonight"
14. "Tiny Dancer"
15. "I Want Love"
16. "Sorry Seems to Be the Hardest Word"
17. "Blue Eyes"
18. "Sacrifice"
19. "Are You Ready for Love"
20. "Sad Songs (Say So Much)"
21. "I'm Still Standing"
22. "The Bitch Is Back"
23. "Saturday Night's Alright for Fighting"
  Encore
24. "Don't Let the Sun Go Down on Me"
25. "Your Song"

== Tour dates ==
Date	City	Country	Venue
Europe
28 May 2006	Dublin	Ireland	Point Depot
29 May 2006	Manchester	England	Manchester Evening News Arena
31 May 2006	Mannheim	Germany	SAP Arena
1 June 2006	Oberhausen	Germany	König Pilsener Arena
3 June 2006	Canterbury	England	St Lawrence Ground
4 June 2006	London	England	The Valley Stadium
6 June 2006	Mönchengladbach	Germany	Borussia-Park
8 June 2006	Wolfsburg	Germany	Volkswagen Arena
10 June 2006	County Durham	England	Riverside Ground
11 June 2006	Worcester	England	New Road Cricket Ground
14 June 2006	Grenoble	France	Grenoble Palais des Sports
16 June 2006	Somerset	England	Taunton County Cricket Ground
21 June 2006	Birmingham	England	National Exhibition Centre
24 June 2006	Oxford	England	Kassam Stadium
25 June 2006	Hove	England	Sussex County Cricket Ground
27 June 2006	Nottingham	England	Nottingham Arena
1 July 2006	Dorset	England	Fitness First Stadium
1 September 2006	Vilnius	Lithuania	Vingis Park
2 September 2006^{[A]}	Sopot	Poland	Sopot International Song Grounds

Festivals and other miscellaneous performances

^{A} This concert was a part of "Sopot International Song Festival"
