= Elton John 2003 Tour =

2003 concert tour by Elton John

- Tour by Elton John
- Poster to the concert in Valletta, Malta
- Location: Europe • North America
- Start date: 17 January 2003
- End date: 8 July 2003
- Legs: 4
- No. of shows: 23

Elton John concert chronology
- A Journey Through Time (2002); 2003 Tour (2003); Face to Face 2003 (2003)

The 2003 Tour was a concert tour by Elton John that took place in 2003 covering two continents, fifteen countries and fifty-three cities.

== Overview ==
The tour started with a benefit concert in Anaheim, California, before a concert in Bakersfield. John travelled to Europe to perform at two further benefit shows in Paris and London before traveling back to the States again to perform a further two benefit concerts in Atlanta, Georgia. After completing the benefit shows John travelled the United States with Billy Joel on their Face to Face tour.

After finishing the Face to Face tour, he performed a series of concerts with the Elton John Band. John performed several solo concerts and two concerts with the band. Afterwards, he started a whole solo tour of Europe from 24 June through to 23 July.

John then returned to the States for several concerts before finishing the tour in Europe.

== Tour dates ==
Date	City	Country	Venue
North America
17 January 2003^{[A]}	Anaheim	United States	Arrowhead Pond of Anaheim
18 January 2003^{[A]}	Bakersfield	United States	Centennial Garden
Europe
3 February 2003^{[A]}^{[C]}	Paris	France	Le Lido
5 February 2003^{[A]}^{[C]}	London	England	The Old Vic
North America
18 February 2003^{[A]}	Atlanta	United States	The Tabernacle
19 February 2003^{[A]}	Atlanta	United States	The Tabernacle
30 May 2003	Ashwaubenon	United States	Resch Center
31 May 2003	Chicago	United States	Arie Crown Theater
3 June 2003	Pensacola	United States	Pensacola Civic Center
4 June 2003	Lafayette	United States	Cajundome
6 June 2003	Laredo	United States	Laredo Entertainment Center
Europe
17 June 2003^{[B]}^{[C]}	London	England	Hampton Court Palace
18 June 2003^{[B]}^{[C]}	London	England	Hampton Court Palace
20 June 2003^{[C]}	Bonn	Germany	Museumsmeile
21 June 2003	Bucharest	Romania	Stadionul Cotroceni
22 June 2003	Budapest	Hungary	Hősök tere
24 June 2003	Moscow	Russia	Kremlin Palace
28 June 2003	Sundsvall	Sweden	Park Arena
1 July 2003	Bergen	Norway	Koengen
3 July 2003	Skane	Sweden	Christinehof Castle
4 July 2003	Horsens	Denmark	Horsens Open Air
6 July 2003	Valletta	Malta	The Granaries
8 July 2003	Madrid	Spain	Plaza de Toros de Las Ventas

Festivals and other miscellaneous performances

^{A} This concert was a benefit concert
^{B} This concert was part of "Hampton Court Palace Festival"
^{C} This concert was a solo concert
