= Elton John 2010 European Tour =

2010 concert tour by Elton John

- Tour by Elton John
- Poster to the concert in Bucharest, Romania
- Location: Africa • Europe
- Start date: 22 May 2010
- End date: 29 June 2010
- Legs: 1
- No. of shows: 16

Elton John concert chronology
- Face to Face 2010 (2010); 2010 European Tour (2010); The Union Tour (2010)

Elton John's 2010 European Tour started in Portugal on 22 May and came to an end on 29 June in the Faroe Islands. During the tour, John and the band performed in Morocco, Serbia, Bulgaria, the Czech Republic, Belarus, and the Faroe Islands for the first time.

== Tour dates ==
Date	City	Country	Venue
Europe and Africa
22 May 2010^{[A]}	Lisbon	Portugal	Parque da Bela Vista
26 May 2010^{[B]}	Rabat	Morocco	Rabat City Park
28 May 2010^{[C]}	Jelling	Denmark	Jelling Festival Grounds
29 May 2010	Watford	England	Vicarage Road
30 May 2010	Warsaw	Poland	Polonia Bydgoszcz Stadium
3 June 2010	Belgrade	Serbia	Belgrade Arena
8 June 2010	Budapest	Hungary	Budapest Sports Arena
10 June 2010	Prague	Czech Republic	O_{2} Arena
12 June 2010	Bucharest	Romania	Piața Constituției
13 June 2010	Sofia	Bulgaria	Lokomotiv Stadium
17 June 2010	Tel Aviv	Israel	Ramat Gan Stadium
19 June 2010	Linz	Austria	TipsArena Linz
20 June 2010	Graz	Austria	Schwarzl Freizeit Zentrum
22 June 2010	Košice	Slovakia	Steel Aréna
26 June 2010	Minsk	Belarus	Minsk-Arena
29 June 2010	Tórshavn	Faroe Islands	Torsvolli

Festivals and other miscellaneous performances

^{A} This concert was a part of "Rock in Rio Lisbon 2010"
^{B} This concert was a part of "Mawazine Festival"
^{C} This concert was a part of "Jelling Festival"
