= Rocket Man: Greatest Hits Live =

2007–10 concert tour by Elton John

- World tour by Elton John
- Poster to the concert in Edmonton, Canada
- Location: Asia • Europe • North America • Oceania • South America
- Associated album: Rocket Man: The Definitive Hits
- Start date: 28 September 2007
- End date: 8 May 2010
- Legs: 4
- No. of shows: 127

Elton John concert chronology
- The Captain and the Kid Tour (2006–08); Rocket Man: Greatest Hits Live (2007–10); Face to Face 2009 (2009)

Rocket Man: Greatest Hits Live was a concert tour by Elton John which lasted for three years from 2007 to 2010.

While performing the Red Piano Europe concerts, John also performed a concert series known as Rocket Man and at the same time performing on the Captain and the Kid Tour.

The first performance took place on 28 September 2007 in Missoula, Montana. The final concert took place on 8 May 2010 in Boca del Río, Mexico.

== Background ==
The first Rocket Man took place on 28 September 2007 in Missoula, Montana. The tour consisted of 23 concerts including 10 in North America, 2 in Asia and 11 in Oceania.

The tour ended with two solo performances in Tokyo, Japan at the Nippon Budokan and eleven solo concerts in Australia.

The 2008 leg of the tour consisted of 68 concert performances. The tour started in January with a performance in Abu Dhabi, United Arab Emirates before travelling to Europe and the North America to perform a series of solo concerts.

After touring North America by himself, John then continued the tour backed by his band before travelling to Asia and, for the second year running, Oceania. After finishing the tour of Australia, John and the band briefly returned to the United States before returning once again to Europe. The European tour included several large open-air concerts, including

- Liberty Stadium in Swansea, Wales
- The Darlington Arena in Darlington, England
- Keepmoat Stadium in Doncaster, England

The tour also included two performances in Surrey, England.

On 4 May 2008 John performed in Chigwell, Essex at Alan Sugar's 40th Wedding Anniversary.

The tour ended on 15 November in Uncasville, Connecticut.

The 2009 leg of the tour started off with four performances in South America, it was only the fourth time that John had performed a tour in South America. After touring South America, John moved into North America where he performed a series of concerts before continuing to Europe.

The European leg of the tour started with a large open-air concert in Limerick, Ireland at Thomond Park. John continued to perform two more open-air concerts in England.

In the fall of 2009, John toured with Ray Cooper in Europe.

The 2010 leg of the tour was the last time that John would tour the Rocket Man concert series. The tour started with two performances in Hawaii with Ray Cooper. It was the first time that John had performed there in nine years.

The tour moved on to South Africa for five shows, where John again performed with Ray Cooper.

After returning from South Africa, John set out on the last leg of the Rocket Man tour. John was once again backed by his band. The first and last dates of this leg were performances in Mexico, where John had not performed a concert since 2001.

== Tour dates ==
Date	City	Country	Venue	Tickets sold / available	Revenue
North America
28 September 2007	Missoula	United States	Adams Center		
29 September 2007	Bozeman	United States	Brick Breeden Fieldhouse	8,747 / 8,747	$735,109
30 September 2007	Casper	United States	Casper Events Center		
5 October 2007	Columbia	United States	Mizzou Arena	14,015 / 14,015	$984,499
6 October 2007	Omaha	United States	Qwest Center	17,017 / 17,017	$1,486,040
7 October 2007	Sioux Falls	United States	Sioux Falls Arena		
12 October 2007	Kansas City	United States	Sprint Center	17,503 / 17,503	$1,486,040
13 October 2007	Moline	United States	iWireless Center	10,972 / 10,972	$760,165
9 November 2007	North Charleston	United States	North Charleston Coliseum		
10 November 2007	Orlando	United States	UCF Arena		
11 November 2007	Estero	United States	Germain Arena		
Asia
20 November 2007^{[S]}	Tokyo	Japan	Nippon Budokan		
21 November 2007^{[S]}	Tokyo	Japan	Nippon Budokan		
Oceania
24 November 2007^{[S]}	Adelaide	Australia	Barossa Arts and Convention Centre		
25 November 2007^{[S]}	Canungra	Australia	Elysian Fields Polo Estate		
28 November 2007^{[S]}	Sydney	Australia	Sydney SuperDome	12,392 / 12,392	$1,869,665
30 November 2007^{[S]}	Canberra	Australia	Stage 88		
1 December 2007^{[S]}	Hunter Valley	Australia	Tempus Two Winery		
2 December 2007^{[S]}	Hunter Valley	Australia	Tempus Two Winery		
4 December 2007^{[S]}	Townsville	Australia	Willows Sports Complex		
6 December 2007^{[S]}	New Plymouth	New Zealand	TSB Bowl of Brooklands		
8 December 2007^{[S]}	Launceston	Australia	York Park		
15 December 2007^{[S]}	Werribee	Australia	Werribee Park		
16 December 2007^{[S]}	Werribee	Australia	Werribee Park		
Middle East
22 January 2008	Abu Dhabi	United Arab Emirates	Emirates Palace Hotel		
Europe
24 January 2008	Tenerife	Spain	Golf Costa Adeje		
North America
28 February 2008^{[S]}	Portland	United States	Cumberland County Civic Center		
2 March 2008^{[S]}	Sudbury	Canada	Sudbury Community Arena		
3 March 2008^{[S]}	Kitchener	Canada	Kitchener Memorial Auditorium		
6 March 2008^{[S]}	Manchester	United States	Verizon Wireless Arena		
10 March 2008^{[S]}	Newark	United States	Bob Carpenter Center		
12 March 2008	Savannah	United States	Savannah Civic Center		
11 April 2008	Missoula	United States	Adams Event Center	7,087 / 7,087	$638,059
12 April 2008	Pullman	United States	Beasley Coliseum		
13 April 2008	Pullman	United States	Beasley Coliseum		
18 April 2008	Bakersfield	United States	Rabobank Arena		
19 April 2008	Anaheim	United States	Honda Center		
23 April 2008	Tallahassee	United States	Leon County Civic Center		
24 April 2008	Gainesville	United States	O'Connell Center		
25 April 2008	Pensacola	United States	Pensacola Civic Center	9,325 / 9,544	$699,755
Europe
3 May 2008^{[A]}	Ischgl	Austria	Idalp		
Asia
7 May 2008	Singapore		Singapore Indoor Stadium		
Oceania
10 May 2008	Perth	Australia	Perth Oval		
12 May 2008	Sydney	Australia	Sydney Entertainment Centre		
14 May 2008	Auckland	New Zealand	Vector Arena		
17 May 2008	Darwin	Australia	TIO Stadium		
Asia
20 May 2008	Chek Lap Kok	Hong Kong	AsiaWorld-Arena		
North America
28 May 2008^{[S]}	Anchorage	United States	Sullivan Arena		
29 May 2008^{[S]}	Fairbanks	United States	Carlson Center		
30 May 2008^{[S]}	Anchorage	United States	Sullivan Arena		
Europe
28 June 2008^{[S]}	Vienna	Austria	Wiener Stadthalle		
29 June 2008	Swansea	Wales	Liberty Stadium		
2 July 2008	Halle	Germany	Gerry Weber Stadion		
3 July 2008	Leipzig	Germany	Volkerschlachtdenkmal		
5 July 2008	Darlington	England	The Darlington Arena		
6 July 2008	Perth	Scotland	McDiarmid Park		
8 July 2008	Konstanz	Germany	Bodenseestadion		
9 July 2008^{[S]}	Venice	Italy	Piazza San Marco		
11 July 2008	Surrey	England	Mercedes-Benz World		
12 July 2008	Doncaster	England	Keepmoat Stadium		
13 July 2008	Surrey	England	Mercedes-Benz World		
North America
19 July 2008	Atlantic City	United States	Boardwalk Hall		
21 July 2008	Essex Junction	United States	Champlain Valley Exposition		
12 September 2008	Calgary	Canada	Pengrowth Saddledome	16,789 / 16,789	$1,860,356
13 September 2008	Edmonton	Canada	Rexall Place	16,208 / 16,208	$1,778,756
15 September 2008	Saskatoon	Canada	Credit Union Centre	12,966 / 12,966	$1,556,218
16 September 2008	Regina	Canada	Brandt Centre	13,595 / 13,595	$1,774,014
17 September 2008	Regina	Canada	Brandt Centre	13,595 / 13,595	$1,774,014
19 September 2008	Winnipeg	Canada	MTS Centre	30,202 / 30,202	$3,450,775
20 September 2008	Winnipeg	Canada	MTS Centre	30,202 / 30,202	$3,450,775
26 September 2008^{[S]}	Halifax	Canada	Halifax Metro Centre	23,583 / 23,583	$3,204,635
27 September 2008^{[S]}	Halifax	Canada	Halifax Metro Centre	23,583 / 23,583	$3,204,635
28 September 2008^{[S]}	Moncton	Canada	Moncton Coliseum	8,499 / 9,000	$1,129,991
30 September 2008^{[S]}	Saint John	Canada	Harbour Station	7,997 / 8,000	$1,774,014
2 October 2008^{[S]}	St. John's	Canada	Mile One Centre	16,327 / 16,327	$2,150,517
3 October 2008^{[S]}	St. John's	Canada	Mile One Centre	16,327 / 16,327	$2,150,517
15 October 2008	Hershey	United States	Giant Center		
17 October 2008	Charlottesville	United States	John Paul Jones Arena		
18 October 2008	Wilkes-Barre	United States	Wachovia Arena at Casey Plaza		
14 November 2008	Uncasville	United States	Mohegan Sun Arena		
15 November 2008	Uncasville	United States	Mohegan Sun Arena		
South America
17 January 2009	São Paulo	Brazil	Anhembi Sambadrome		
19 January 2009	Rio de Janeiro	Brazil	Praça da Apoteose		
22 January 2009	Buenos Aires	Argentina	Estadio Alberto J. Armando		
24 January 2009	Santiago	Chile	Movistar Arena		
25 January 2009	Caracas	Venezuela	Hotel Eurobuilding		
29 January 2009	Bogotá	Colombia	Centro de Ferias Corferias		
North America
31 January 2009	Mexico City	Mexico	Exconvento de las Vizcaínas		
1 April 2009	Rapid City	United States	Don Barnett Arena		
3 April 2009	Laramie	United States	Arena-Auditorium		
4 April 2009	Colorado Springs	United States	World Arena		
Europe
6 June 2009	Limerick	Ireland	Thomond Park		
10 June 2009	Glasgow	Scotland	Scottish Exhibition and Conference Centre		
13 June 2009	Bristol	England	Bristol County Cricket Ground		
14 June 2009	Norfolk	England	Holkham Hall		
20 June 2009	Skien	Norway	Skagerak Arena		
21 June 2009	Borås	Sweden	Borås Arena		
27 June 2009	Lisbon	Portugal	Pavilhão Atlântico		
30 June 2009	Wiesbaden	Germany	Wiesbaden Bowling Green		
3 July 2009	Dresden	Germany	Theaterplatz		
4 July 2009	Nuremberg	Germany	Easy-Credit-Stadium		
5 July 2009	Stuttgart	Germany	Hanns-Martin-Schleyer-Halle		
7 July 2009	Verona	Italy	Verona Arena		
8 July 2009	Pula	Croatia	Pula Arena		
11 September 2009^{[S]}	Naples	Italy	Piazza del Plebiscito		
Middle East
27 March 2010^{[B]}	Dubai	UAE	Meydan Racecourse		
North America
3 April 2010	Mérida	Mexico	Chichen Itza		
6 April 2010	Corpus Christi	United States	American Bank Center		
9 April 2010	Lubbock	United States	United Spirit Arena		
10 April 2010	Austin	United States	Frank Erwin Center		
15 April 2010	Hoffman Estates	United States	Sears Centre		
16 April 2010	Des Moines	United States	Wells Fargo Arena		
17 April 2010	Ashwaubenon	United States	Resch Center		
24 April 2010	Grand Rapids	United States	Van Andel Arena		
25 April 2010	Toledo	United States	Lucas County Arena		
30 April 2010	Reading	United States	Sovereign Center		
1 May 2010	Youngstown	United States	Covelli Centre		
8 May 2010	Boca del Río	Mexico	Estadio Luis de la Fuente		
9 July 2010	Kingston	Canada	K-Rock Centre		
10 July 2010	Hamilton	Canada	Copps Coliseum		
12 July 2010	Sault Ste. Marie	Canada	Essar Centre		
16 July 2010	Prince George	Canada	CN Centre		
17 July 2010	Kelowna	Canada	Prospera Place		
18 July 2010	Yakima	United States	Yakima SunDome		
22 July 2010	Tucson	United States	Tucson Arena		
24 July 2010	Chula Vista	United States	Cricket Wireless Amphitheatre		
28 July 2010	Lake Tahoe	United States	Harveys Outdoor Arena		

Festivals and other miscellaneous performances

^{A} This concert was a part of "Top of the Mountain"
^{B} This concert was a part of "Dubai World Cup"
^{S} This concert was a solo concert

Cancellations and rescheduled shows

16 June 2010	Augustenborg, Denmark	Slotspark	Cancelled
21 July 2010	Tucson, Arizona	Tucson Arena	Rescheduled to 22 July 2010
