= The Union Tour =

2010 concert tour by Elton John and Leon Russell

- Tour by Elton John and Leon Russell
- Tour program
- Location: Europe • North America
- Associated album: The Union
- Start date: 19 October 2010
- End date: 21 November 2010
- Legs: 1
- No. of shows: 13
Elton John tour chronology
2010 European Tour (2010)	The Union Tour (2010)	Greatest Hits Tour (2011–12)

In October 2010, Elton John embarked on a short tour of the United States with Leon Russell to promote their new album The Union. The pair also made an appearance on the BBC Radio 2 Electric Proms in London, England. They also appeared at T-Bone Burnett's Speaking Clock Revue. Their performance of "Monkey Suit" is included on T Bone Burnett Presents: The Speaking Clock Revue which was released in late 2011.

== Set list ==
Standard tour set list

Leon Russell & Band

1. "Tight Rope"
2. "Out in the Woods"
3. "Prince of Peace"
4. "A Song for You"
5. "Delta Lady"
6. "Roll in My Sweet Baby's Arms"
7. "Stranger in a Strange Land"
  Elton John & Band
8. "Saturday Night's Alright for Fighting"
9. "Philadelphia Freedom"
10. "Goodbye Yellow Brick Road"
11. "Rocket Man"
12. "Don't Let the Sun Go Down on Me"
13. "Bennie and the Jets"
14. "I'm Still Standing"
  Elton John & Band with Leon Russell
15. "If It Wasn't for Bad"
16. "Hey Ahab"
17. "Gone to Shiloh"
18. "Jimmie Rodgers' Dream"
19. "There's No Tomorrow"
20. "Monkey Suit"
21. "The Best Part of the Day"
22. "A Dream Come True"
23. "When Love Is Dying"
24. "Hearts Have Turned to Stone"
25. "Never Too Old (To Hold Somebody)"
26. "In the Hands of Angels"
  Elton John & Band
27. "Burn Down the Mission"
28. "Levon"
29. "Tiny Dancer"
30. "Ballad of a Well-Known Gun"
31. "I Guess That's Why They Call It the Blues"
32. "Take Me to the Pilot"
33. "Sad Songs Say So Much"
34. "The Bitch Is Back"
35. "Your Song"
BBC Radio 2 Electric Proms set list

Elton John & Band

1. "Burn Down the Mission"
2. "Levon"
3. "Tiny Dancer"
4. "Ballad of a Well Known Gun"
  Elton John & Band with Plan B
5. "I Guess That's Why They Call It the Blues"
  Leon Russell & Band
6. "Delta Lady"
7. "A Song for You"
  Leon Russell & Band with Rumer
8. "Masquerade"
  Elton John & Band with Leon Russell
9. "If It Wasn't for Bad"
10. "Eight Hundred Dollar Shoes"
11. "Hey Ahab"
12. "Gone to Shiloh"
13. "Jimmy Rogers' Dream"
14. "There's No Tomorrow"
15. "Monkey Suit"
16. "The Best Part of the Day"
17. "A Dream Come True"
18. "I Should Have Sent Roses"
19. "When Love Is Dying"
20. "Hearts Have Turned to Stone"
21. "Never Too Old (To Hold Somebody)"
  Leon Russell & Band
22. "In the Hands of Angels"
23. "Tightrope"
24. "Prince of Peace/Out in the Woods"
25. "Roll in My Sweet Baby's Arms"
26. "Strangers in a Strange Land"
  Elton John & Band
27. "Your Song"
28. "Take Me to the Pilot"
29. "Sad Songs (Say So Much)"
30. "The Bitch Is Back"
  Encore
31. "Hey Ahab"

== Tour dates ==
Date	City	Country	Venue
North America and Europe
19 October 2010	New York City	United States	Beacon Theatre
28 October 2010	London	England	BBC Radio 2 Electric Proms
3 November 2010	Los Angeles	United States	Hollywood Palladium
5 November 2010	Ontario	United States	Citizens Business Bank Arena
6 November 2010	Phoenix	United States	US Airways Center
8 November 2010	Hidalgo	United States	State Farm Arena
10 November 2010	Lafayette	United States	Cajundome
12 November 2010	Tulsa	United States	BOK Center
13 November 2010	Fort Worth	United States	Fort Worth Convention Center
16 November 2010	Asheville	United States	Asheville Civic Center
19 November 2010	Chattanooga	United States	McKenzie Arena
20 November 2010	Daytona Beach	United States	Ocean Center
21 November 2010	Lakeland	United States	Lakeland Center
