= The Captain and the Kid Tour =

2006–08 concert tour by Elton John

- Tour by Elton John
- Poster to the concert in Werchter, Belgium
- Location: Africa • Europe • North America • Oceania
- Associated album: The Captain & the Kid
- Start date: 15 September 2006
- End date: 19 January 2008
- Legs: 6
- No. of shows: 67

Elton John concert chronology
- 2006 European Tour (2006); The Captain and the Kid Tour (2006–08); Rocket Man: Greatest Hits Live (2007–10)

The Captain and the Kid Tour was a concert tour by Elton John which lasted from September 2006 until January 2008. The tour was to promote the album of the same name.

The tour started on 15 September 2006, in Sacramento, California. The tour covered sixteen states in the United States and eight provinces in Canada. The tour travelled from the United States to Europe and then to South Africa. The tour came to a close in Johannesburg on 19 January 2008.

== Background ==
After the 2006 European tour, John performed more shows in Las Vegas before going back to Europe to perform two shows in Eastern Europe. He then returned to the United States to embark on the Captain and the Kid Tour to promote his new album of the same name.

John returned to Las Vegas for the last time in 2006 to perform eleven Red Piano shows. After these shows, he went back on the road to promote The Captain & the Kid once more, visiting New York City then major cities in Canada. John then returned to Europe to perform two nights in Basel, Switzerland, to perform in the Avo Session Basel in mid-November. John and his band then visited Australia and New Zealand.

After returning to Las Vegas briefly, John and the band travelled to Europe to continue promoting The Captain & the Kid throughout Europe including a solo concert in Madrid. John performed at the Concert for Diana once at the very beginning; he opened the show with a solo performance of "Your Song". John later returned with the rest of his band to close with concert. They played three songs but were originally scheduled to play four, but "Crocodile Rock" was dropped from the setlist because piano complications before John's performance pushed his appearance later into the evening and they could not exceed the sound curfew in place.

The South African shows marked the end of the tour.

== Tour dates ==
Date	City	Country	Venue
North America
15 September 2006	Sacramento	United States	ARCO Arena
16 September 2006	San Jose	United States	HP Pavilion at San Jose
19 September 2006	West Valley City	United States	E-Center
20 September 2006	Boise	United States	Taco Bell Arena
22 September 2006	Seattle	United States	KeyArena
23 September 2006	Seattle	United States	KeyArena
24 September 2006	Portland	United States	Rose Garden
27 September 2006	Vancouver	Canada	General Motors Place
29 September 2006	Calgary	Canada	Pengrowth Saddledome
30 September 2006	Edmonton	Canada	Rexall Place
6 October 2006	Pittsburgh	United States	Mellon Arena
7 October 2006	Atlantic City	United States	Boardwalk Hall
1 November 2006	Uniondale	United States	Nassau Veterans Memorial Coliseum
2 November 2006	Uniondale	United States	Nassau Veterans Memorial Coliseum
4 November 2006	Toronto	Canada	Air Canada Centre
5 November 2006	Hamilton	Canada	Copps Coliseum
6 November 2006	London	Canada	John Labatt Centre
10 November 2006	Ottawa	Canada	Scotiabank Place
11 November 2006	Montreal	Canada	Bell Centre
Europe
17 November 2006^{[A]}	Basel	Switzerland	Messe Basel
18 November 2006^{[A]}	Basel	Switzerland	Messe Basel
Oceania
26 November 2006	Brisbane	Australia	Brisbane Entertainment Centre
28 November 2006	Sydney	Australia	Sydney Entertainment Centre
29 November 2006	Sydney	Australia	Sydney Entertainment Centre
1 December 2006	Sydney	Australia	Sydney Entertainment Centre
3 December 2006	Melbourne	Australia	Rod Laver Arena
6 December 2006	Wellington	New Zealand	Westpac Stadium
8 December 2006	Melbourne	Australia	Rod Laver Arena
9 December 2006	Adelaide	Australia	Adelaide Entertainment Centre
11 December 2006	Perth	Australia	Burswood Dome
North America
23 February 2007	El Paso	United States	Don Haskins Center
24 February 2007	Albuquerque	United States	Tingley Coliseum
21 March 2007	Hartford	United States	Hartford Civic Center
22 March 2007	Providence	United States	Dunkin' Donuts Center
25 March 2007	New York City	United States	Madison Square Garden
28 April 2007	San Juan	Puerto Rico	José Miguel Agrelot Coliseum
29 April 2007^{[B]}	Tobago	West Indies	Plymouth Recreational Grounds
4 May 2007	Greenville	United States	BI-LO Center
5 May 2007	Birmingham	United States	Birmingham–Jefferson Convention Complex
Europe
20 May 2007	Vitoria-Gasteiz	Spain	Plaza de Toros de Vitoria-Gasteiz
24 May 2007	Sheffield	England	Hallam FM Arena
26 May 2007	Plymouth	England	Home Park
29 May 2007	Versailles	France	Château de Versailles
1 June 2007	Belfast	Northern Ireland	Odyssey Arena
3 June 2007	Carlisle	England	Brunton Park
8 June 2007	Baden-Baden	Germany	Rennplatz
9 June 2007	Aschaffenburg	Germany	Castle Lowenstein
16 June 2007	Kyiv	Ukraine	Maidan Nezalezhnosti
20 June 2007	Malmö	Sweden	Malmö Stadion
22 June 2007	Fredrikstad	Norway	Fredrikstad Stadion
23 June 2007	Valencia	Spain	Plaza de Toros
24 June 2007	Odense	Denmark	Fionia Park
26 June 2007	Kristiansand	Norway	Start Stadium
1 July 2007^{[C]}	London	England	Wembley Stadium
3 July 2007^{[D]}	Madrid	Spain	Polideportivo Villalba
6 July 2007	St. Petersburg	Russia	Palace Square
7 July 2007^{[E]}	Werchter	Belgium	Werchter Park
9 July 2007^{[F]}	Cork	Ireland	The Docklands
10 July 2007^{[G]}	Lucca	Italy	Piazza Napoleone
14 July 2007	Glasgow	Scotland	Scottish Exhibition & Conference Centre
15 July 2007	Inverness	Scotland	Tulloch Caledonian Stadium
8 September 2007	Vevey	Switzerland	Place du Marche
11 September 2007	Paris	France	Zénith de Paris
14 September 2007	Riga	Latvia	Arena Riga
15 September 2007	Tallinn	Estonia	Saku Suurhall Arena
18 September 2007	Moscow	Russia	Red Square
23 September 2007	Baku	Azerbaijan	Tofiq Bahramov Stadium
Africa
13 January 2008	Cape Town	South Africa	Newlands Cricket Ground
16 January 2008	Durban	South Africa	ABSA Stadium
18 January 2008	Johannesburg	South Africa	Coca-Cola Dome
19 January 2008	Johannesburg	South Africa	Coca-Cola Dome

Festivals and other miscellaneous performances

^{A} This concert was a part of "AVO Festival"
^{B} This concert was a part of "Tobago Jazz Fest"
^{C} This concert was a part of "Concert for Diana"
^{D} This concert was a part of "Via Jazz Festival"
^{E} This concert was a part of "TW Classic"
^{F} This concert was a part of "Live at the Marquee"
^{G} This concert was a part of "Lucca Summer Festival"
^{H} This concert was a solo concert

=== Box office score data ===
Venue	City	Tickets sold / available	Gross revenue
Point Theatre	Dublin, Ireland	12,294 / 12,294 (100%)	$2,787,729
ARCO Arena	Sacramento, California	13,782 / 13,782 (100%)	$1,290,415
HP Pavilion	San Jose, California	13,878 / 13,878 (100%)	$1,497,314
E Center	West Valley City, Utah	10,095 / 10,267 (99%)	$845,845
Taco Bell Arena	Boise, Idaho	11,444 / 11,444 (100%)	$849,760
Rose Garden	Portland, Oregon	13,176 / 13,176 (100%)	$1,292,245
Pengrowth Saddledome	Calgary, Canada	17,257 / 17,257 (100%)	$1,881,382
Rexall Place	Edmonton, Canada	16,496 / 16,496 (100%)	$1,770,058
Mellon Arena	Pittsburgh, Pennsylvania	13,101 / 17,179 (74%)	$1,115,660
Copps Coliseum	Hamilton, Canada	16,106 / 16,106 (100%)	$1,558,513
John Labatt Centre	London, England	10,057 / 10,057 (100%)	$1,284,051
Scotiabank Place	Ottawa, Canada	15,467 / 15,467 (100%)	$1,455,098
Bell Centre	Montreal, Canada	18,208 / 18,208 (100%)	$1,794,154
Arena Riga	Riga, Latvia	13,856 / 13,856 (100%)	$972,400
Saku Suurhall Arena	Tallinn, Estonia	10,000 / 10,000 (100%)	$1,045,893
Total		206,217 / 208,780 (≈100%)	$21,289,856
