= Elton John 2004 Tour =

2004 concert tour by Elton John

- Tour by Elton John
- Poster to the concert in the Royal Albert Hall, London, UK
- Location: Asia • Europe • North America
- Start date: 8 March 2004
- End date: 23 September 2004
- Legs: 9
- No. of shows: 36

Elton John concert chronology
- Face to Face 2003 (2003); 2004 Tour (2004); Peachtree Road Tour (2004–05)

The 2004 Tour was a concert tour by Elton John that took place in 2004 covering three continents, fourteen countries and twenty-nine cities.

== Background ==
John and his band set out on tour on 13 February 2004. John held the second ever residency at the Colosseum at Caesars Palace while Céline Dion was continuing her A New Day... residency. The show was called the Red Piano because of the prominent red piano that John played on stage. The idea for the show originated in 2004 by John and David LaChapelle. The Red Piano was originally scheduled to be 75 shows over three years. John ended his residency at the Colosseum on 22 April 2009, and eventually performed two-hundred and forty-three shows.

John and the band then went on to tour the United States and John then went in to perform several shows in Europe after which he went on to tour Europe with rest of his band.

John then performed five shows with the Royal Academy of Music in the United Kingdom after which he traveled to the United States to perform further five shows at Radio City Music Hall with the New York Philharmonic Orchestra.

John and the band then went to perform their first show in Gibraltar and went on to perform in China, South Korea and Taiwan.

== Set list ==
Standard North American set list
1. "Bennie and the Jets"
2. "The Bitch Is Back"
3. "Levon"
4. "Daniel"
5. "Someone Saved My Life Tonight"
6. "Ballad of the Boy in the Red Shoes"
7. "Philadelphia Freedom"
8. "Rocket Man"
9. "I Guess That's Why They Call It the Blues"
10. "I Want Love"
11. "Tiny Dancer"
12. "Take Me to the Pilot"
13. "Sorry Seems to Be the Hardest Word"
14. "Nikita"
15. "Original Sin"
16. "Candle in the Wind"
17. "Funeral for a Friend/Love Lies Bleeding"
18. "Believe"
19. "All the Girls Love Alice"
20. "I'm Still Standing"
21. "Saturday Night's Alright for Fighting"
22. "Crocodile Rock"
23. "Pinball Wizard"
24. "Don't Let the Sun Go Down on Me"
25. "Your Song"
Standard solo set list
1. "Your Song"
2. "The Greatest Discovery"
3. "Border Song"
4. "I Need You to Turn To"
5. "The One"
6. "Someone Saved My Life Tonight"
7. "Ballad of the Boy in the Red Shoes"
8. "Honky Cat"
9. "Daniel"
10. "Mona Lisas and Mad Hatters"
11. "Rocket Man"
12. "I'm Still Standing"
13. "Ticking"
14. "Tiny Dancer"
15. "Blue Eyes"
16. "Sacrifice"
17. "Philadelphia Freedom"
18. "Nikita"
19. "Candle in the Wind"
20. "Sorry Seems to Be the Hardest Word"
21. "I Guess That's Why They Call It the Blues"
22. "Original Sin"
23. "Carla/Etude"
24. "Tonight"
25. "Bennie and the Jets"
26. "Crocodile Rock"
27. "Don't Let the Sun Go Down on Me"
Royal Academy set list
1. "Sixty Years On"
2. "The Greatest Discovery"
3. "I Need You to Turn To"
4. "Border Song"
5. "The King Must Die"
6. "Burn Down the Mission"
7. "Believe"
8. "Come Down in Time"
9. "Tell Me When the Whistle Blows"
10. "Tiny Dancer"
11. "Madman Across the Water"
12. "Holiday Inn"
13. "Levon"
14. "Sorry Seems to Be the Hardest Word"
15. "This Train Don't Stop There Anymore"
16. "Philadelphia Freedom"
17. "Have Mercy on the Criminal"
18. "Carla/Etude"
19. "Tonight"
20. "Take Me to the Pilot"
21. "Saturday Night's Alright for Fighting"
22. "Don't Let the Sun Go Down on Me"
23. "Your Song"
24. "Saturday Night's Alright for Fighting"
Royal Orchestra set list
1. "Sixty Years On"
2. "The Greatest Discovery"
3. "I Need You to Turn To"
4. "Border Song"
5. "The King Must Die"
6. "Burn Down the Mission"
7. "Believe"
8. "Come Down in Time"
9. "Tell Me When the Whistle Blows"
10. "Tiny Dancer"
11. "Madman Across the Water"
12. "Holiday Inn"
13. "Levon"
14. "Sorry Seems to Be the Hardest Word"
15. "This Train Don't Stop There Anymore"
16. "Freaks in Love"
17. "Philadelphia Freedom"
18. "Have Mercy on the Criminal"
19. "Carla/Etude"
20. "Tonight"
21. "Take Me to the Pilot"
22. "Saturday Night's Alright for Fighting"
23. "Don't Let the Sun Go Down on Me"
24. "Your Song"

== Tour dates ==
Date	City	Country	Venue	Tickets sold / available	Revenue
North America
8 March 2004^{[A]}	Kamloops	Canada	Sport Mart Place		
16 April 2004	Reading	United States	Sovereign Center	8,675 / 8,675	$755,690
17 April 2004	Amherst	United States	William D. Mullins Memorial Center	7,613 / 9,266	$518,331
23 April 2004	Manchester	United States	Verizon Wireless Arena	10,966 / 10,966	$905,237
24 April 2004	Portland	United States	Cumberland County Civic Center	8,341 / 8,341	$665,825
27 April 2004	Bridgeport	United States	Arena at Harbor Yard	18,508 / 18,508	$1,692,749
28 April 2004	Bridgeport	United States	Arena at Harbor Yard	18,508 / 18,508	$1,692,749
Europe
26 May 2004^{[A]}	Palermo	Italy	Velodromo Paolo Borsellino		
28 May 2004^{[A]}	Bayonne	France	Arene de Bayonne		
30 May 2004^{[A]}	Nicosia	Cyprus	Davila Moat		
1 June 2004^{[A]}	Karlstad	Sweden	Löfbergs Lila Arena		
3 June 2004^{[A]}	Stavanger	Norway	Gamle Stavanger Stadion		
5 June 2004^{[A]}	Langesund	Norway	Krogshavn		
6 June 2004^{[A]}	Aalborg	Denmark	Kongress Kultur Center		
8 June 2004^{[A]}	Genova	Italy	Piazza Del Mare		
9 June 2004^{[A]}	Reggio Calabria	Italy	Stadio Oreste Granillo		
11 June 2004	Bristol	England	Ashton Gate Stadium	21,840 / 21,840	$1,944,569
16 June 2004	Suffolk	England	Portman Road	22,746 / 22,746	$2,207,065
18 June 2004	Aberdeen	Scotland	Pittodrie Stadium		
20 June 2004	Kent	England	The Hop Farm Country Park		
28 June 2004^{[B]}	Birmingham	England	National Exhibition Centre		
29 June 2004^{[B]}	Birmingham	England	National Exhibition Centre		
1 July 2004^{[B]}	London	England	Wembley Arena		
3 July 2004^{[B]}	London	England	Wembley Arena		
4 July 2004^{[B]}	London	England	Royal Albert Hall		
North America
13 July 2004^{[C]}	New York City	United States	Radio City Music Hall	28,984 / 28,984	$5,290,740
14 July 2004^{[C]}	New York City	United States	Radio City Music Hall	28,984 / 28,984	$5,290,740
15 July 2004^{[C]}	New York City	United States	Radio City Music Hall	28,984 / 28,984	$5,290,740
17 July 2004^{[C]}	New York City	United States	Radio City Music Hall	28,984 / 28,984	$5,290,740
18 July 2004^{[C]}	New York City	United States	Radio City Music Hall	28,984 / 28,984	$5,290,740
Europe
10 September 2004	Gibraltar	Gibraltar	Victoria Stadium		
Asia
14 September 2004	Hong Kong		Hong Kong Convention and Exhibition Centre	7,713 / 7,926	$954,943
17 September 2004	Seoul	South Korea	Seoul Olympics Main Stadium		
19 September 2004	Shanghai	China	Grand Stage	11,194 / 14,000	$1,220,495
21 September 2004	Shanghai	China	Grand Stage	11,194 / 14,000	$1,220,495
23 September 2004	Taipei	Taiwan	Chung Shan Football Stadium	9,570 / 10,000	$697,518

Festivals and other miscellaneous performances

^{A} This concert was a solo concert
^{B} This concert was with the Royal Academy of Music
^{C} This concert was with the New York Philharmonic Orchestra
