= Face to Face 2003 =

2003 concert tour by Elton John and Billy Joel

- National tour by Elton John and Billy Joel
- Poster to the concert in Alabama, USA
- Location: U.S., North America
- Start date: 21 February 2003
- End date: 8 May 2003
- Legs: 1
- No. of shows: 28
Elton John tour chronology
2003 Tour (2003)	Face to Face 2003 (2003)	2004 Tour (2004)
Billy Joel tour chronology
Face to Face 2002 (2002)	Face to Face 2003 (2003)	Face to Face 2009 (2009)

Face to Face 2003 was a concert tour by Elton John and Billy Joel. The pair performed under the Face to Face concert series, which was constantly proving more popular amongst fans.

The tour started on 21 February in Birmingham, Alabama and travelled throughout the United States for twenty four concert dates until 8 May in Rosemont, Illinois, where the tour came to a close after this concert had been rescheduled from March.

Joel stated in 2012 that he would no longer tour with John because it restrains his setlists.

== Set list ==
This set list is representative of the first performance in Las Vegas. It does not represent all concerts for the duration of the tour.

Elton and Billy with the band

1. "Your Song"
2. "Just the Way You Are"
3. "Don't Let the Sun Go Down on Me"

Elton John with his band

1. "Funeral for a Friend/Love Lies Bleeding"
2. "Someone Saved My Life Tonight"
3. "Philadelphia Freedom"
4. "The Wasteland"
5. "I Want Love"
6. "Rocket Man"
7. "Take Me to the Pilot"
8. "I Guess That's Why They Call It the Blues"
9. "Tiny Dancer"
10. "Crocodile Rock"

Billy Joel with his band

1. "Scenes from an Italian Restaurant"
2. "Movin' Out"
3. "Prelude/Angry Young Man"
4. "Allentown"
5. "An Innocent Man"
6. "The River of Dreams"
7. "I Go to Extremes"
8. "New York State of Mind"
9. "It's Still Rock and Roll to Me"
10. "Only the Good Die Young"

Billy and Elton with the band

1. "My Life"
2. "The Bitch Is Back"
3. "You May Be Right"
4. "Bennie and the Jets"
5. "A Hard Day's Night"
6. "Great Balls of Fire"
7. "Piano Man"

== Tour dates ==
List of concerts, showing date, city, country, venue, tickets sold, number of available tickets and amount of gross revenue
Date	City	Country	Venue	Attendance	Revenue
North America
21 February 2003	Birmingham	United States	Birmingham–Jefferson Convention Complex	17,398 / 17,398	$1,930,860
24 February 2003	Houston	United States	Compaq Center	16,160 / 16,160	$2,043,984
26 February 2003	San Antonio	United States	SBC Center	16,835 / 16,835	$1,407,325
28 February 2003	Dallas	United States	American Airlines Center	17,881 / 17,881	$1,937,460
2 March 2003	Oklahoma City	United States	Ford Center	17,871 / 17,871	$1,941,910
4 March 2003	Indianapolis	United States	Conseco Fieldhouse	15,644 / 15,644	$1,706,866
7 March 2003	Pittsburgh	United States	Mellon Arena	16,684 / 16,684	$1,765,475
9 March 2003	Buffalo	United States	HSBC Arena	18,727 / 18,727	$1,996,750
12 March 2003	Lexington	United States	Rupp Arena	—N/a	—N/a
14 March 2003	Columbia	United States	Carolina Center	15,672 / 15,672	$1,394,470
16 March 2003	Raleigh	United States	RBC Center	18,505 / 18,505	$1,861,195
28 March 2003	Paradise	United States	MGM Grand Garden Arena	27,418 / 27,418	$4,462,200
29 March 2003	Paradise	United States	MGM Grand Garden Arena	27,418 / 27,418	$4,462,200
1 April 2003	Ames	United States	Hilton Coliseum	14,400 / 14,400	$1,436,215
6 April 2003	Madison	United States	Kohl Center	15,854 / 15,854	$1,752,050
8 April 2003	Milwaukee	United States	Bradley Center	17,647 / 17,647	$2,073,705
12 April 2003	Rosemont	United States	Allstate Arena	—N/a	$5,912,385
15 April 2003	Cleveland	United States	Gund Arena	19,777 / 19,777	$2,187,660
17 April 2003	St. Paul	United States	Xcel Energy Center	18,162 / 18,162	$2,194,690
19 April 2003	Fargo	United States	Fargodome	22,852 / 22,852	$1,675,477
22 April 2003	Columbus	United States	Nationwide Arena	23,782 / 23,782	$1,877,400
24 April 2003	Albany	United States	Pepsi Arena	31,015 / 31,015	$3,547,735
26 April 2003	Albany	United States	Pepsi Arena	31,015 / 31,015	$3,547,735
30 April 2003	Rosemont	United States	Allstate Arena	—N/a	(Note: The gross data is representative of the three shows in Rosemont, Illinois at the Allstate Arena on 10 April, 30 April, and 8 May respectively.)
2 May 2003	Auburn Hills	United States	The Palace of Auburn Hills	41,836 / 41,836	$4,669,250
3 May 2003	Auburn Hills	United States	The Palace of Auburn Hills	41,836 / 41,836	$4,669,250
5 May 2003	St. Louis	United States	Savvis Center	18,247 / 18,247	$1,964,765
8 May 2003	Rosemont	United States	Allstate Arena	—N/a	
Total				405,683 / 405,683	$49,974,352
