= Peachtree Road (album) =

Studio album by Elton John
- Released: 9 November 2004
- Recorded: January 2004
- Studios: Tree Studios and Silent Sound (Atlanta, Georgia) The Record Plant (Los Angeles, California) Right Track Recording (New York City, New York)
- Genres: Country rock, blues rock, pop rock
- Length: 52:01
- Labels: Universal (US); Rocket (UK)
- Producer: Elton John

Elton John chronology
Remixed (2003)	Peachtree Road (2004)	The Captain & the Kid (2006)

Singles from Peachtree Road
- 1. "Answer in the Sky" Released: 2004 (only in North America); 2. "All That I'm Allowed" Released: December 2004 (first single outside North America); 3. "Turn the Lights Out When You Leave" Released: 2005

Singles from Peachtree Road [2005 CD reissue]
- 1. "Electricity" Released: 2005

Professional ratings
Aggregate scores
Source	Rating
Metacritic	70/100
Review scores
Source	Rating
AllMusic	4/5 stars
The Encyclopedia of Popular Music	4/5 stars
Entertainment Weekly	(B−)
Los Angeles Times	3/4 stars
The Guardian	3/5 stars

Peachtree Road is the twenty-seventh studio album by the British musician Elton John, released on 9 November 2004. The album was named after Peachtree Road, the northern part of Peachtree Street in Atlanta, where one of John's four homes is located. This is the only album during his long career on which John has sole credit as producer, although on some previous projects he was listed as a co-producer, with Clive Franks (on A Single Man, 21 at 33 and parts of The Fox), or Greg Penny (on Duets and Made in England). It was recorded in January 2004.

Despite its generally positive reviews, Peachtree Road was one of John's lowest-selling contemporary efforts, reaching No. 17 on the US Billboard 200 upon its release, yet only managing No. 21 on the UK Albums Chart, making it one of his rare albums to miss the top ten in his homeland. In the US, it was certified gold in December 2004 by the RIAA. It debuted at No. 12 in Denmark in November 2004, its highest chart placing in that country and peaked at No. 11 in Switzerland.

== Background ==
In addition to Nigel Olsson playing drums on all tracks, once again a permanent member of John's touring and recording Elton John Band, the album features renowned gospel vocalist Adam McKnight, as well as members of Chicago Walter Parazaider, James Pankow and Lee Loughnane contributing horns and brass arrangements. Guy Babylon was credited with playing Hammond organ and Rhodes piano instead of keyboards, which was the case on earlier albums. John Jorgenson, a member of John's band from 1995 to 2000, plays pedal steel guitar on "Turn the Lights Out When You Leave".

The album was dedicated to the memory of Gus and Sheila Dudgeon, John's original producer and his wife, who were killed in a car accident in 2002. It was re-released in July 2005 with three bonus tracks from Billy Elliot the Musical, as well as a DVD featuring nine tracks from the album performed live in Atlanta. The song "Electricity" from the musical was also released as a single in June 2005. It rose to No. 4 on the UK singles chart.

Some editions of the album included as a bonus two videos for the two first singles ("Answer in the Sky" and "All That I'm Allowed"). Songs from the album debuted at the Tabernacle in Atlanta in early November. John also performed at the November 2005 Country Music Association Awards, televised live from Madison Square Garden, duetting with Dolly Parton on "Turn the Lights Out When You Leave" and a cover of John Lennon's "Imagine".

== Album cover ==
The album art on the front cover is a photograph of a railroad crossing in Pinehurst, Georgia taken by London photographer Sam Taylor-Wood. Taken in by the American South and given complete artistic freedom, she shot thousands of photos during her week-long trip. The trip included other towns like Unadilla and Forsyth in Georgia. While she also visited Peachtree Road in the Buckhead area of Atlanta, she thought it was too busy for the album's more mellow nature. She picked several photos to present to him, and John made the final selection. Other photos from the shoot appear on the back of the album cover and in the included CD and SACD booklet.

== Singles ==
- "Answer in the Sky" was picked as the first single from the album and was only released in North America, reaching No. 7 on the Adult Contemporary chart. The song ended John's streak of hitting the Top 10 on that chart as a solo performer. John still charted there, however after this song his singles only reached the Top 20. This song became John's most recent single on the AC chart to reach the Top 10 in 17 years until 2021's "Cold Heart (Pnau Remix)" featuring Dua Lipa, which peaked at No. 1 (originally No. 5). The music video of the song, directed by David LaChapelle, features professional dancers dancing in different places built on the studio.
- "All That I'm Allowed", the first single released outside North America. It reached No. 20 in the UK singles chart and No. 24 on the US Adult Contemporary Chart. The music video features different people in their respective states, emphasizing the message and meaning of this song.
- "Turn the Lights Out When You Leave" was the last single released from the album, it reached No. 32 in the UK singles chart. The music video, directed by Sam Taylor-Wood, was shot outside Los Angeles and features Thomas Jane and Desperate Housewives star Teri Hatcher with John as a piano player in the background, performing this song.

== Track listing ==
All tracks are written by Elton John and Bernie Taupin, except where noted.

No.	Title	Length
1.	"Weight of the World"	3:58
2.	"Porch Swing in Tupelo"	4:38
3.	"Answer in the Sky"	4:03
4.	"Turn the Lights Out When You Leave"	5:02
5.	"My Elusive Drug"	4:12
6.	"They Call Her the Cat"	4:27
7.	"Freaks in Love"	4:32
8.	"All That I'm Allowed"	4:52
9.	"I Stop and I Breathe"	3:39
10.	"Too Many Tears"	4:14
11.	"It's Getting Dark in Here"	3:50
12.	"I Can't Keep This from You"	4:34
Total length:		52:01

Bonus tracks (2005 CD reissue)
No.	Title	Length
13.	"The Letter" (Lyrics: Lee Hall)	2:33
14.	"Merry Christmas Maggie Thatcher" (Lyrics: Hall)	3:38
15.	"Electricity" (Lyrics: Hall)	3:29
Total length:		61:41

Bonus DVD (2005 reissue)
No.	Title	Length
1.	"Weight of the World"
2.	"Porch Swing in Tupelo"
3.	"Answer in the Sky"
4.	"Turn the Lights Out When You Leave"
5.	"My Elusive Drug"
6.	"They Call Her the Cat"
7.	"Freaks in Love"
8.	"All That I'm Allowed"
9.	"I Can't Keep This from You"

Notes

- Track 8 was titled "All That I'm Allowed" on the original 2004 release of the album but was titled "All That I'm Allowed (I'm Thankful)" on the 2005 expanded edition.
- All tracks on the DVD recorded live at The Tabernacle, Atlanta (November 2004).

== Personnel ==
=== Musicians ===
- Elton John – lead vocals, acoustic piano, backing vocals (1, 3, 4, 6–8, 10, 12), Rhodes electric piano (10)
- Guy Babylon – programming, Hammond organ (2–9, 11–13), Rhodes electric piano (6–9, 11), keyboards (14, 15)
- Davey Johnstone – electric guitar, acoustic guitar (1–4, 7–9, 11, 12, 14, 15), dobro (1, 2, 6, 10, 13), backing vocals (1, 5, 10, 14, 15), baritone guitar (3, 6), slide guitar (3, 5, 10), Leslie guitar (5), sitar (8), mandolin (10)
- John Jorgenson – pedal steel guitar (4)
- Bob Birch – bass, backing vocals (1, 5, 10, 14, 15)
- Nigel Olsson – drums, backing vocals (1, 5, 10, 11)
- John Mahon – percussion, backing vocals (1, 5, 10), programming (9, 11)
- Larry Klimas – baritone saxophone (6)
- Walter Parazaider – tenor saxophone (6)
- James Pankow – trombone (6), horn arrangements (6)
- Lee Loughnane – trumpet (6)
- Martin Tillman – electric cello (10)
- Rick Astley – backing vocals (14, 15)
- Gary Barlow – backing vocals (14, 15)

=== Orchestra (tracks 1–5 and 7–12) ===
- Guy Babylon – orchestration, orchestral arrangements
- Sandy de Crescent and David Low – orchestra management
- Steve Erdody, Tim Landauer, Stan Sharp and Martin Tillman – cello
- Brian Dembrow, Vicki Miskolczy, Simon Oswell and Jimbo Ross – viola
- Charlie Bisharat, Joel Derouin, Bruce Dukow, Endre Granat, Eric Hosler, Dimitrie Leiviachi, Phillip Levy, Robin Olson, Sid Page, Mark Robinson, Anatoly Rosinsky and Lisa Sutton – violin

=== The "Voices of Atlanta" Choir ===
- Charles Bullock (2, 7–9, 11, 12)
- Terrence Davis (2, 6–9, 11, 12)
- Todd Honeycutt (2, 6)
- Adam McKnight (also choirmaster) (2, 6–9, 11, 12)
- Rosalind McKnight (2, 3, 6)
- L'Tanya Shields (2, 3, 6)
- M. Denise Sims (2, 3, 6)
- Alecia Terry (2, 3, 6)
- Mark Ford (6–9, 11, 12)

=== Production ===
- Elton John – producer
- Matt Still – engineer, mixing
- Jason Carson – assistant engineer
- John Holmes – assistant engineer
- Josh McDonnell – assistant engineer
- Josh "Frodo" Monroy – assistant engineer
- Rob Skipworth – assistant engineer
- Tom Tapley – assistant engineer
- Bob Ludwig – mastering at Gateway Mastering (Portland, Maine)
- Todd Interland – A&R coordinator
- Derek Mackillop – A&R coordinator, management
- Adrian Collee – studio coordinator
- Tony Smith – keyboard technician
- Dale Sticha – keyboard technician
- Rick Salazar – guitar technician
- Chris Sobchack – drum technician
- Davey Johnstone – musical director
- Sam Taylor-Wood – photography
- Intro – design
- Keith Bradley – management
- Frank Presland – management
- Twenty-First Artists Ltd. – management company

=== 2005 reissue ===
- Peacock – design, cover illustration
- Herb Ritts – photography
- Sam Taylor-Wood – photography
- Bernie Taupin – liner notes
- Twenty-First Artists Ltd. – management
- Sanctuary Group – management

== Charts ==
Chart performance for Peachtree Road
Chart (2004–2005)	Peak position
Australian Albums (ARIA)	44
Austrian Albums (Ö3 Austria)	27
Belgian Albums (Ultratop Flanders)	84
Belgian Albums (Ultratop Wallonia)	74
Danish Albums (Hitlisten)	12
Dutch Albums (Album Top 100)	97
French Albums (SNEP)	63
German Albums (Offizielle Top 100)	31
Italian Albums (FIMI)	25
New Zealand Albums (RMNZ)	34
Norwegian Albums (VG-lista)	16
Scottish Albums (Official Charts)	28
Swedish Albums (Sverigetopplistan)	38
Swiss Albums (Schweizer Hitparade)	11
UK Albums (Official Charts)	21
US Billboard 200	17

== Certifications ==
Region	Certification	Certified units/sales
Denmark (IFPI Danmark)	Gold	20,000^{^}
Switzerland (IFPI Switzerland)	Gold	20,000^{^}
United Kingdom (BPI)	Gold	100,000^{^}
United States (RIAA)	Gold	500,000^{^}
^{^} Shipments figures based on certification alone.
