= Face to Face 2002 =

2002 concert tour by Elton John and Billy Joel

- National tour by Elton John and Billy Joel
- Poster to the concert in Pennsylvania, USA
- Location: U.S., North America
- Start date: 13 January 2002
- End date: 13 October 2002
- Legs: 2
- No. of shows: 28
Elton John tour chronology
Songs from the West Coast Tour (2001–02)	Face to Face 2002 (2002)	A Journey Through Time (2002)
Billy Joel tour chronology
Face to Face 2001 (2001)	Face to Face 2002 (2002)	Face to Face 2003 (2003)

In 2002, Elton John and Billy Joel continued on their success Face to Face concert series.

The tour started in the winter of 2002 and continued until the fall of the same year. The concerts scheduled for 11 March through 6 April were cancelled and then postponed until the fall of the same year due to Joel's ill health.

Joel stated in 2012 that he would no longer tour with Elton because it restrains his setlists.

== Tour dates ==
Date	City	Country	Venue	Tickets sold / available	Revenue
First Leg
13 January 2002	Washington, D.C.	United States	MCI Center	18,606 / 18,606	$1,922,735
16 January 2002	University Park	United States	Bryce Jordan Center	15,030 / 15,030	$1,610,618
18 January 2002	Washington, D.C.	United States	MCI Center	37,214 / 37,214	$3,845,470
20 January 2002	Washington, D.C.	United States	MCI Center	37,214 / 37,214	$3,845,470
22 January 2002	Boston	United States	FleetCenter	68,155 / 71,564	$7,236,695
24 January 2002	Boston	United States	FleetCenter	68,155 / 71,564	$7,236,695
29 January 2002	Boston	United States	FleetCenter	68,155 / 71,564	$7,236,695
31 January 2002	Boston	United States	FleetCenter	68,155 / 71,564	$7,236,695
4 February 2002	Hartford	United States	Hartford Civic Center	47,475 / 48,666	$3,845,470
6 February 2002	Hartford	United States	Hartford Civic Center	47,475 / 48,666	$3,845,470
8 February 2002	Hartford	United States	Hartford Civic Center	47,475 / 48,666	$3,845,470
13 February 2002	Philadelphia	United States	First Union Center	112,248 / 112,248	$12,986,840
15 February 2002	Philadelphia	United States	First Union Center	112,248 / 112,248	$12,986,840
17 February 2002	Philadelphia	United States	First Union Center	112,248 / 112,248	$12,986,840
19 February 2002	Philadelphia	United States	First Union Center	112,248 / 112,248	$12,986,840
22 February 2002	Philadelphia	United States	First Union Center	112,248 / 112,248	$12,986,840
24 February 2002	Philadelphia	United States	First Union Center	112,248 / 112,248	$12,986,840
3 March 2002	Sunrise	United States	National Car Rental Center	58,226 / 58,226	$5,818,001
5 March 2002	Sunrise	United States	National Car Rental Center	58,226 / 58,226	$5,818,001
7 March 2002	Sunrise	United States	National Car Rental Center	58,226 / 58,226	$5,818,001
9 March 2002	Tampa	United States	Ice Palace	20,628 / 21,045	$2,329,530
15 March 2002	New York City	United States	Madison Square Garden	18,799 / 19,325	$2,168,960
Second Leg
13 September 2002	Tampa	United States	St. Pete Times Forum	16,011 / 19,012	$1,673,535
17 September 2002	Atlanta	United States	Philips Arena	19,409 / 19,409	$2,025,750
20 September 2002	Boston	United States	FleetCenter	17,483 / 17,483	$1,835,530
23 September 2002	New York City	United States	Madison Square Garden	18,634 / 18,634	$2,141,030
25 September 2002	Uniondale	United States	Nassau Coliseum	33,884 / 33,884	$3,582,020
27 September 2002	Uniondale	United States	Nassau Coliseum	33,884 / 33,884	$3,582,020
2 October 2002	East Rutherford	United States	Continental Airlines Arena	59,688 / 59,688	$6,192,840
4 October 2002	East Rutherford	United States	Continental Airlines Arena	59,688 / 59,688	$6,192,840
8 October 2002	East Rutherford	United States	Continental Airlines Arena	59,688 / 59,688	$6,192,840
11 October 2002	Uniondale	United States	Nassau Coliseum	33,884 / 33,884	$3,582,020
13 October 2002	Uniondale	United States	Nassau Coliseum	33,884 / 33,884	$3,582,020

== Setlists ==
Standard setlist

Elton John & Billy Joel & Bands

1. Your Song
2. Just the Way You Are
3. Don't Let the Sun Go Down on Me

Elton John & Band

1. Funeral for a Friend/Love Lies Bleeding
2. Someone Saved My Life Tonight
3. Philadelphia Freedom
4. I Want Love
5. Rocket Man
6. Take Me to the Pilot
7. Have Mercy on the Criminal
8. Tiny Dancer
9. This Train Don't Stop There Anymore
10. I'm Still Standing
11. Crocodile Rock

Billy Joel & Band

1. Prelude/Angry Young Man
2. Allentown
3. Movin' Out (Anthony's Song)
4. Summer, Highland Falls
5. Lullabye (Goodnight, My Angel)
6. The River of Dreams
7. New York State of Mind
8. Miami 2017 (Seen the Lights Go Out on Broadway)
9. All for Leyna
10. I Go to Extremes
11. Only The Good Die Young
12. Scenes from an Italian Restaurant

Elton John & Billy Joel & Bands

1. My Life
2. The Bitch Is Back
3. You May Be Right
4. Bennie and the Jets
5. A Hard Day's Night
6. Great Balls of Fire
7. Candle in the Wind
8. Piano Man
