= Face to Face 2001 =

2001 concert tour by Elton John and Billy Joel

Face To Face 2001
- Continental tour by Elton John and Billy Joel
- Poster to the concert in Nashville, USA
- Location: North America
- Start date: 12 January 2001
- End date: 16 May 2001
- Legs: 2
- No. of shows: 33 in total
Elton John tour chronology
Stately Home Tour (2000)	Face to Face 2001 (2001)	2001 Solo Tour (2001)
Billy Joel tour chronology
Face to Face 1998 (1998)	Face to Face 2001 (2001)	Face to Face 2002 (2002)

In the winter of 2001, Elton John and Billy Joel toured with their Face to Face concert series. The tour started in Honolulu, Hawaii (where they had not performed together before). The first leg of the tour closed at the MGM Grand Garden Arena in Paradise, Nevada, on 17 and 18 February.

The tour resumed on 9 April in Denver and the 2001 performances closed at the Target Center in Minneapolis on 15 and 16 May.

John and Joel performed the 'Face To Face' concerts again the following year. Joel stated in 2012 that he would no longer tour with John because of setlist constraints.

== Tour dates ==
Date	City	Country	Venue
North America
19 January 2001	San Diego	United States	Cox Arena
22 January 2001	Vancouver	Canada	General Motors Place
24 January 2001	Tacoma	United States	Tacoma Dome
26 January 2001	Portland	United States	Rose Garden
29 January 2001	Salt Lake City	United States	Delta Center
31 January 2001	Sacramento	United States	ARCO Arena
2 February 2001	Oakland	United States	The Arena in Oakland
4 February 2001	San Jose	United States	San Jose Arena
6 February 2001	Inglewood	United States	Great Western Forum
9 February 2001	Inglewood	United States	Great Western Forum
11 February 2001	Inglewood	United States	Great Western Forum
13 February 2001	Phoenix	United States	America West Arena
17 February 2001	Las Vegas	United States	MGM Grand Garden Arena
18 February 2001	Las Vegas	United States	MGM Grand Garden Arena
9 April 2001	Denver	United States	Pepsi Center
12 April 2001	Kansas City	United States	Kemper Arena
14 April 2001	Memphis	United States	Pyramid Arena
17 April 2001	New Orleans	United States	New Orleans Arena
19 April 2001	Charlotte	United States	Charlotte Coliseum
21 April 2001	Nashville	United States	Gaylord Entertainment Center
24 April 2001	Atlanta	United States	Philips Arena
26 April 2001	Louisville	United States	Freedom Hall
28 April 2001	Greensboro	United States	Greensboro Coliseum
3 May 2001	Montreal	Canada	Molson Centre
5 May 2001	Syracuse	United States	Carrier Dome
7 May 2001	Rosemont	United States	Allstate Arena
9 May 2001	Rosemont	United States	Allstate Arena
11 May 2001	Rosemont	United States	Allstate Arena
13 May 2001	Cincinnati	United States	Firstar Center
15 May 2001	Minneapolis	United States	Target Center
16 May 2001	Minneapolis	United States	Target Center

=== Box office score data ===
Venue	City	Tickets sold / available	Gross revenue
Cox Arena	San Diego	12,795 / 12,795 (100%)	$1,400,528
Dome	Tacoma	22,580 / 22,580 (100%)	$2,093,520
General Motors Place	Vancouver	18,358 / 18,358 (100%)	$1,578,733
Rose Garden	Portland	18,114 / 18,114 (100%)	$1,775,685
Delta Center	Salt Lake City	16,538 / 16,538 (100%)	$1,668,470
ARCO Arena	Sacramento	16,080 / 16,123 (99%)	$1,485,460
Alameda Coliseum	Oakland	17,047 / 17,128 (99%)	$1,558,057
Compaq Center	San Jose	17,657 / 17,657 (100%)	$1,665,320
The Forum	Inglewood	52,861 / 52,861 (100%)	$4,886,945
America West Arena	Phoenix	17,541 / 19,126 (92%)	$1,754,000
MGM Grand	Las Vegas	26,977 / 26,977 (100%)	$4,843,650
Pepsi Center	Denver	18,546 / 18,546 (100%)	$2,119,580
The Pyramid	Memphis	13,894 / 19,686 (71%)	$1,544,000
Coliseum	Charlotte	23,061 / 23,061 (100%)	$2,173,865
Arena	New Orleans	16,625 / 17,096 (97%)	$1,838,737
Gaylord Center	Nashville	17,303 / 17,303 (100%)	$1,733,145
Philips Arena	Atlanta	19,892 / 19,892 (100%)	$1,990,010
Coliseum	Greensboro	21,958 / 21,958 (100%)	$2,042,490
Molson Centre	Montreal	18,711 / 18,711 (100%)	$1,886,351
Carrier Dome	Syracuse	38,653 / 38,653 (100%)	$3,452,430
Allstate Arena	Rosemont	52,946 / 52,946 (100%)	$6,393,525
Firstar Center	Cincinnati	16,683 / 16,683 (100%)	$1,910,505
Target Center	Minneapolis	36,609 / 36,609 (100%)	$4,015,565
TOTAL		531,429 / 539,401 (99%)	$55,810,571
