= Elton John 1970 World Tour =

1970 concert tour by Elton John

- Debut tour by Elton John
- Poster for the concert in San Francisco, USA
- Location: Europe; North America
- Associated album: Elton John
- Start date: 25 March 1970
- End date: 20 December 1970
- Legs: 5
- No. of shows: 54

Elton John concert chronology
- 1970 World Tour (1970); Goodbye Yellow Brick Road Tour (1973–74)

The first time Elton John toured was in 1970 to support his second album Elton John. The first leg focused around the London area excluding the last two nights of the tour.

John, Nigel Olsson and Dee Murray then crossed over to North America, where they were booked to play six nights at the Troubadour Club, which proved John to be a success and brought him to the attention of the American public.

John's short residency at The Troubadour attracted several famous visitors including his idol Leon Russell. Bob Dylan also visited John and Bernie Taupin backstage before one of the performances. The first performance was introduced by Neil Diamond.

Following the success of the shows at The Troubadour John embarked on his first major tour of the United States starting on 29 October 1970 and ending on 4 December 1970. Opening for him through the US tour was the band Hookfoot, which consisted of his colleagues at DJM Records–Caleb Quaye, Roger Pope, Ian Duck and David Glover.

One show at the A&R Studios in New York City was recorded and later released as 17-11-70.

== Tour dates ==
| Date | City | Country | Venue |
|---|---|---|---|
Europe
| 25 March 1970 | London | England | Revolution Club |
| 7 April 1970 | London | England | Roundhouse |
| 21 April 1970 | London | England | Roundhouse |
| 7 May 1970 | London | England | Roundhouse |
| 9 May 1970 | Slough | England | Slough College |
| 30 May 1970 | Birmingham | England | Mothers |
| 5 June 1970 | London | England | Marquee Club |
| 6 June 1970 | London | England | Marquee Club |
| 17 June 1970 | London | England | Lyceum Theatre |
| 19 June 1970 | Mantorp | Sweden | Mantorp Park |
| 21 June 1970 | London | England | Roundhouse |
| 26 June 1970 | Twickenham | England | St. Mary's College |
| 3 July 1970 | London | England | Hampstead Country Club |
| 4 July 1970 | London | England | The Speakeasy Club |
| 11 July 1970 | Knokke | Belgium | Knokke Casino |
| 13 August 1970 | London | England | Playhouse Theatre |
| 14 August 1970 | Barkisland | England | Jazz, Folk & Blues Festival |
North America
| 25 August 1970 | Los Angeles | United States | Troubadour |
| 26 August 1970 | Los Angeles | United States | Troubadour |
| 27 August 1970 | Los Angeles | United States | Troubadour |
| 28 August 1970 | Los Angeles | United States | Troubadour |
| 29 August 1970 | Los Angeles | United States | Troubadour |
| 30 August 1970 | Los Angeles | United States | Troubadour |
| 1 September 1970 | San Francisco | United States | Troubadour North |
| 2 September 1970 | San Francisco | United States | Troubadour North |
| 3 September 1970 | San Francisco | United States | Troubadour North |
| 4 September 1970 | San Francisco | United States | Troubadour North |
| 5 September 1970 | San Francisco | United States | Troubadour North |
| 6 September 1970 | San Francisco | United States | Troubadour North |
| 10 September 1970 | New York City | United States | Playboy Club |
| 11 September 1970 | Philadelphia | United States | Electric Factory |
| 12 September 1970 | Philadelphia | United States | Electric Factory |
Support Act for Fotheringay
| 2 October 1970 | London | England | Royal Albert Hall |
North America
| 29 October 1970 | Boston | United States | Boston Tea Party |
| 30 October 1970 | Boston | United States | Boston Tea Party |
| 31 October 1970 | Boston | United States | Boston Tea Party |
| 6 November 1970 | Philadelphia | United States | Electric Factory |
| 7 November 1970 | Philadelphia | United States | Electric Factory |
| 8 November 1970 | Owings Mills | United States | Painters Mill Music Fair |
| 12 November 1970 | San Francisco | United States | Fillmore West |
| 13 November 1970 | San Francisco | United States | Fillmore West |
| 14 November 1970 | San Francisco | United States | Fillmore West |
| 15 November 1970 | Santa Monica | United States | Santa Monica Civic Auditorium |
| 20 November 1970 | New York City | United States | Fillmore East |
| 21 November 1970 | New York City | United States | Fillmore East |
| 22 November 1970 | Bridgeport | United States | University of Bridgeport |
| 23 November 1970 | Glassboro | United States | Glassboro State College |
| 25 November 1970 | Chicago | United States | Auditorium Theatre |
| 26 November 1970 | Cleveland | United States | Music Hall |
| 27 November 1970 | Detroit | United States | Eastown Theatre |
| 28 November 1970 | Detroit | United States | Eastown Theatre |
| 29 November 1970 | Minneapolis | United States | Guthrie Theater |
| 1 December 1970 | Fulton | United States | Champ Auditorium |
| 4 December 1970 | Anaheim | United States | Anaheim Convention Center |
| 5 December 1970 | San Bernardino | United States | Swing Auditorium |
| 6 December 1970 | Los Angeles | United States | Royce Hall |
Europe
| 20 December 1970 | London | England | Roundhouse |

== Setlist ==
=== Standard UK setlist ===
1. "Your Song"
2. "Border Song"
3. "Sixty Years On"
4. "Take Me to the Pilot"
5. "Greatest Discovery"
6. "I Need You to Turn To"
7. "Burn Down the Mission"

=== Standard US setlist ===
1. "Bad Side of the Moon"
2. "Country Comfort"
3. "Can I Put You On"
4. "Border Song"
5. "Amoreena"
6. "Take Me to the Pilot"
7. "Sixty Years On"
8. "Honky Tonk Women"
9. "Burn Down the Mission"/"My Baby Left Me"/"Get Back"
10. "Give Peace a Chance"/"Wanna Take You Higher"
11. Your Song"

=== A&R Studios (17-11-70) setlist ===
1. "I Need You to Turn to"
2. "Your Song"
3. "Country Comfort"
4. "Border Song"
5. "Indian Sunset"
6. "Amoreena"
7. "Bad Side of the Moon"
8. "Take Me to the Pilot"
9. "Sixty Years On"
10. "Honky Tonk Women"
11. "Can I Put You On"
12. "Burn Down the Mission"
13. "My Father's Gun"
