= A Journey Through Time =

2002 concert tour by Elton John

- National tour by Elton John
- Australian stamp & CD tour pack
- Location: Australia, Oceania
- Start date: 17 April 2002
- End date: 30 April 2002
- Legs: 1
- No. of shows: 11

Elton John concert chronology
- Face to Face 2002 (2002); A Journey Through Time (2002); 2003 Tour (2003)

A Journey Through Time was a 2002 concert tour by Elton John.

This is the eleventh tour of Australia by Elton John. The tour completely sold out.

== Set list ==
This set list is representative of the first show in Melbourne. It does not represent all dates throughout the tour.

1. "Funeral for a Friend/Love Lies Bleeding"
2. "Bennie and the Jets"
3. "Someone Saved My Life Tonight"
4. "The Ballad of the Boy in the Red Shoes"
5. "Philadelphia Freedom"
6. "The Wasteland"
7. "Rocket Man"
8. "I Guess That's Why They Call It the Blues"
9. "Daniel"
10. "I Want Love"
11. "This Train Don't Stop There Anymore"
12. "Take Me to the Pilot"
13. "Sacrifice"
14. "Blue Eyes"
15. "Sorry Seems to Be the Hardest Word"
16. "Oh My Sweet Carolina"
17. "Mona Lisas and Mad Hatters"
18. "Holiday Inn"
19. "Tiny Dancer"
20. "Levon"
21. "Original Sin"
22. "I'm Still Standing"
23. "Crocodile Rock"
24. "Pinball Wizard"
25. "Don't Let the Sun Go Down on Me"
26. "Your Song"

== Tour dates ==
Date	City	Country	Venue
Oceania
17 April 2002	Adelaide	Australia	Adelaide Entertainment Centre
19 April 2002	Melbourne	Australia	Rod Laver Arena
20 April 2002	Melbourne	Australia	Rod Laver Arena
23 April 2002	Boondall	Australia	Brisbane Entertainment Centre
24 April 2002	Boondall	Australia	Brisbane Entertainment Centre
25 April 2002	Sydney	Australia	Sydney Entertainment Centre
26 April 2002	Sydney	Australia	Sydney Entertainment Centre
27 April 2002	Sydney	Australia	Sydney Entertainment Centre
28 April 2002	Melbourne	Australia	Melbourne Entertainment Centre
29 April 2002	Sydney	Australia	Sydney Entertainment Centre
30 April 2002	Sydney	Australia	Sydney Entertainment Centre

== Personnel ==
- Elton John – piano, vocals
- Nigel Olsson – drums, backing vocals
- John Mahon – percussion, backing vocals
- Davey Johnstone – guitars, mandolin, backing vocals
- Bob Birch – bass, backing vocals
- Guy Babylon – keyboards
