= Face to Face 1998 =

Concert tour by Elton John and Billy Joel

- Tour by Elton John and Billy Joel
- Poster to the concert in Tokyo, Japan
- Location: Asia • Europe • Oceania
- Start date: 4 March 1998
- End date: 30 June 1998
- Legs: 3
- No. of shows: 28 in total
Elton John tour chronology
Big Picture Tour (1997–98)	Face to Face 1998 (1998)	An Evening with Elton John (1999)
Billy Joel tour chronology
Face to Face 1995 (1995)	Face to Face 1998 (1998)	Face to Face 2001 (2001)

Riding on the success of their previous two tours, Elton John and Billy Joel once again hit the stadiums in 1998. The production had previously only toured the United States and Canada, but this time they visited Australia, New Zealand, Japan, and Europe, avoiding any North American cities.

On 6 June, Joel pulled out of a concert at Wembley Stadium in London, England due to illness. John performed the show without him, playing several of Joel's songs. The same happened in Zurich, Switzerland at Letzigrund Stadium on 30 June; this was the last night of the 1998 tour.

Joel stated in 2012 that he would no longer tour with John because it restricts his setlists.

== Tour dates ==
Date	City	Country	Venue
Oceania
4 March 1998	Perth	Australia	Subiaco Oval
7 March 1998	Auckland	New Zealand	Ericsson Stadium
8 March 1998	Auckland	New Zealand	Ericsson Stadium
10 March 1998	Brisbane	Australia	ANZ Stadium
12 March 1998	Sydney	Australia	Sydney Cricket Ground
14 March 1998	Sydney	Australia	Sydney Cricket Ground
15 March 1998	Sydney	Australia	Sydney Cricket Ground
18 March 1998	Adelaide	Australia	Adelaide Oval
20 March 1998	Melbourne	Australia	Melbourne Cricket Ground
21 March 1998	Melbourne	Australia	Melbourne Cricket Ground
Asia
26 March 1998	Fukuoka	Japan	Fukuoka Dome
28 March 1998	Osaka	Japan	Osaka Dome
30 March 1998	Tokyo	Japan	Tokyo Dome
31 March 1998	Tokyo	Japan	Tokyo Dome
3 April 1998	Nagoya	Japan	Nagoya Dome
Europe
29 May 1998	Dublin	Ireland	Croke Park
30 May 1998	Dublin	Ireland	Croke Park
2 June 1998	Glasgow	Scotland	Ibrox Stadium
6 June 1998	London	England	Wembley Stadium
7 June 1998	London	England	Wembley Stadium
10 June 1998	Düsseldorf	Germany	Rheinstadion
12 June 1998	Berlin	Germany	Olympiastadion
14 June 1998	Munich	Germany	Olympiastadion
16 June 1998	Vienna	Austria	Ernst-Happel-Stadion
22 June 1998	Copenhagen	Denmark	Parken Stadium
25 June 1998	Helsinki	Finland	Helsinki Olympic Stadium
27 June 1998	Gothenburg	Sweden	Ullevi
30 June 1998	Zurich	Switzerland	Letzigrund

== Setlists ==
Standard Oceania setlist

Elton John & Billy Joel & Bands

1. Your Song
2. Don't Let the Sun Go Down on Me

Elton John & Band

1. Simple Life
2. The One
3. Grey Seal
4. Goodbye Yellow Brick Road
5. Honky Cat
6. Can You Feel the Love Tonight
7. Uptown Girl
8. I Don't Wanna Go on with You Like That
9. I Guess That's Why They Call It the Blues (with Billy Joel)
10. Daniel
11. Take Me to the Pilot
12. Something About the Way You Look Tonight
13. Sad Songs (Say So Much)
14. Philadelphia Freedom
15. Saturday Nights Alright for Fighting

Billy Joel & Band

1. Prelude/Angry Young Man
2. Anthony's Song
3. Just the Way You Are
4. Allentown
5. I Go to Extremes
6. My Life (with Elton John)
7. Lullaby
8. River of Dreams
9. Candle in the Wind
10. We Didn't Start the Fire
11. Only the Good Die Young
12. Big Shot
13. Scenes from an Italian Restaurant

Elton John & Billy Joel & Bands

1. Lucy in the Sky with Diamonds
2. The Bitch Is Back
3. You May Be Right
4. Bennie and the Jets
5. Great Balls of Fire
6. Piano Man
Standard Asian setlist

Elton John & Billy Joel & Bands

1. Your Song
2. Don't Let the Sun Go Down on Me

Billy Joel & Band

1. Angry Young Man
2. The Stranger
3. Allentown
4. I Go to Extremes
5. My Life (with Elton John)
6. River of Dreams
7. Candle in the Wind (Joel)
8. It's Still Rock and Roll to Me
9. Big Shot

Elton John & Band

1. Simple Life
2. The One
3. Grey Seal
4. Can You Feel the Love Tonight
5. Uptown Girl (John)
6. I Don't Wanna Go on with You Like That
7. I Guess That's Why They Call It the Blues (with Billy Joel)
8. Daniel
9. Take Me to the Pilot
10. Something About the Way You Look Tonight
11. Saturday Nights Alright for Fighting

Elton John & Billy Joel & Bands

1. Lucy in the Sky with Diamonds
2. The Bitch Is Back
3. You May Be Right
4. Bennie and the Jets
5. Piano Man
Standard European setlist

Elton John & Billy Joel & Bands

1. Your Song
2. Honesty
3. Don't Let the Sun Go Down on Me

Billy Joel & Band

1. We Didn't Start the Fire
2. Pressure
3. Just the Way You Are
4. I Go to Extremes
5. My Life (with Elton John)
6. Candle in the Wind
7. River of Dreams
8. It's Still Rock and Roll to Me
9. Scenes from an Italian Restaurant
10. Only the Good Die Young

Elton John & Band

1. Funeral for a Friend / Love Lies Bleeding
2. Goodbye Yellow Brick Road
3. Honky Cat
4. Sacrifice
5. Philadelphia Freedom
6. I Guess That's Why They Call It the Blues (with Billy Joel)
7. If the River Can Bend
8. I Don't Wanna Go on with You Like That
9. Daniel
10. Can You Feel the Love Tonight
11. Rocket Man
12. Uptown Girl
13. Crocodile Rock
14. Saturday Night's Alright for Fighting

Elton John & Billy Joel & Bands'

1. Lucy in the Sky with Diamonds
2. The Bitch Is Back
3. You May Be Right
4. Bennie and the Jets
5. Great Balls of Fire
6. Piano Man
6 June 1998 - London (Without Billy Joel)
1. Funeral for a Friend/Love Lies Bleeding
2. Grey Seal
3. Goodbye Yellow Brick Road
4. Honky Cat
5. Can You Feel the Love Tonight
6. Tiny Dancer
7. I Guess That's Why They Call It the Blues
8. If the River Can Bend
9. Don't Let the Sun Go Down on Me
10. Daniel
11. Rocket Man
12. I Don't Wanna Go on with You Like That
13. Sacrifice
14. Crocodile Rock
15. Mona Lisas and Mad Hatters
16. Sorry Seems to Be the Hardest Word
17. Philadelphia Freedom
18. Simple Life
19. The One
20. Take Me to the Pilot
21. Something About the Way You Look Tonight
22. Uptown Girl
23. Bennie and the Jets
24. Saturday Night's Alright for Fighting
25. Lucy in the Sky with Diamonds
26. Great Balls of Fire
27. Your Song
28. Piano Man
10 June 1998 - Dusseldorf (Without Billy Joel)
1. Funeral for a Friend/Love Lies Bleeding
2. Grey Seal
3. Goodbye Yellow Brick Road
4. Honky Cat
5. Can You Feel the Love Tonight
6. Tiny Dancer
7. I Guess That's Why They Call It the Blues
8. If the River Can Bend
9. I Don't Wanna Go on with You Like That
10. Don't Let the Sun Go Down on Me
11. Daniel
12. Rocket Man
13. Sacrifice
14. Crocodile Rock
15. Sad Songs (Say So Much)
16. Mona Lisas and Mad Hatters
17. Sorry Seems to Be the Hardest Word
18. Philadelphia Freedom
19. Simple Life
20. The One
21. Take Me to the Pilot
22. Something About the Way You Look Tonight
23. Uptown Girl
24. Bennie and the Jets
25. Saturday Night's Alright for Fighting
26. Lucy in the Sky with Diamonds
27. The Bitch Is Back
28. Great Balls of Fire
29. Your Song
30. Piano Man
30 June 1998 - Zurich (Without Billy Joel)
1. Funeral for a Friend/Love Lies Bleeding
2. Grey Seal
3. Goodbye Yellow Brick Road
4. Honky Cat
5. Can You Feel the Love Tonight
6. Tiny Dancer
7. I Guess That's Why They Call It the Blues
8. If the River Can Bend
9. I Don't Wanna Go on with You Like That
10. Don't Let the Sun Go Down on Me
11. Daniel
12. Rocket Man
13. Sacrifice
14. Crocodile Rock
15. Sad Songs (Say So Much)
16. Mona Lisas and Mad Hatters
17. Sorry Seems to Be the Hardest Word
18. Philadelphia Freedom
19. Simple Life
20. The One
21. Take Me to the Pilot
22. Something About the Way You Look Tonight
23. Uptown Girl
24. Bennie and the Jets
25. Saturday Night's Alright for Fighting
26. Lucy in the Sky with Diamonds
27. The Bitch Is Back
28. Great Balls of Fire
29. Piano Man
