= European Express Tour =

1984 concert tour by Elton John

- Continental tour by Elton John
- Poster to the concert in Bad Segeberg, West Germany
- Location: Europe
- Associated album: Breaking Hearts
- Start date: 17 April 1984
- End date: 30 June 1984
- Legs: 1
- No. of shows: 52

Elton John concert chronology
- Too Low for Zero Tour (1984); European Express Tour (1984); Breaking Hearts Tour (1984)

The European Express Tour was the European leg of Elton John's 1984 Breaking Hearts Tour.

== Background ==
The European Express Tour, which was a continuation of the Too Low for Zero Tour of Oceania took place across three months during the summer of 1984. The tour included several countries that Elton and his band had not previously performed in. This included Poland, Czechoslovakia, Hungary, Yugoslavia, Italy, Austria and Spain.

The tour came to an end at London's Wembley Stadium on 30 June 1984. This concert was recorded for broadcast on the U.S. Showtime cable network and Britain's BBC Radio 1. The performance was later released on VHS as Night and Day Concert.

== Set list ==
This set list is representative of the performance on 28 May 1984 in Paris, France. It does not represent the set list at all concerts for the duration of the tour.

1. "Tiny Dancer"
2. "Hercules"
3. "Rocket Man"
4. "Daniel"
5. "Restless"
6. "Candle in the Wind"
7. "The Bitch Is Back"
8. "Don't Let the Sun Go Down on Me"
9. "Sad Songs (Say So Much)"
10. "Bennie and the Jets"
11. "Sorry Seems to Be the Hardest Word"
12. "Philadelphia Freedom"
13. "Blue Eyes"
14. "I Guess That's Why They Call It the Blues"
15. "Kiss the Bride"
16. "One More Arrow"
17. "Too Low for Zero"
18. "I'm Still Standing"
19. "Your Song"
20. "Saturday Night's Alright for Fighting"
21. "Crocodile Rock"
  Encore
22. "Song for Guy" or "Medley: Whole Lotta Shakin’ Goin On / I Saw Her Standing There / Twist and Shout"

== Tour dates ==
Date	City	Country	Venue
Europe
17 April 1984	Sarajevo	Yugoslavia	Olimpijska Dvorana Zetra
18 April 1984	Belgrade	Yugoslavia	Hala Pionir
19 April 1984	Zagreb	Yugoslavia	Dom Sportova
21 April 1984	Budapest	Hungary	Budapest Sportcsarnok
22 April 1984	Budapest	Hungary	Budapest Sportcsarnok
24 April 1984	Prague	Czechoslovakia	Palace of culture
25 April 1984	Ostrava	Czechoslovakia	Havířov Sport Hall
26 April 1984	Katowice	Poland	Spodek
27 April 1984	Warsaw	Poland	Sala Kongresowa
28 April 1984	Gdańsk	Poland	Hala Olivia
30 April 1984	Stockholm	Sweden	Johanneshov Isstadion
2 May 1984	Drammen	Norway	Drammenshallen
4 May 1984	Copenhagen	Denmark	Valby-Hallen
5 May 1984	Copenhagen	Denmark	Brøndbyhallen
6 May 1984	Rotterdam	Netherlands	Ahoy Hall
7 May 1984	Brussels	Belgium	Forest National
8 May 1984	Brussels	Belgium	Forest National
11 May 1984	Cologne	West Germany	Sporthalle
12 May 1984	Essen	West Germany	Grugahalle
13 May 1984	Essen	West Germany	Grugahalle
14 May 1984	Bremen	West Germany	Stadhalle Bremen
15 May 1984	Stuttgart	West Germany	Hanns-Martin-Schleyer-Halle
17 May 1984	Hanover	West Germany	Stadionsporthalle
18 May 1984	West Berlin	West Germany	Waldbühne
20 May 1984	Bad Segeberg	West Germany	Freilichtbühne
22 May 1984	Munich	West Germany	Olympiahalle
23 May 1984	Vienna	Austria	Wiener Stadthalle
25 May 1984	Geneva	Switzerland	Patinoire des Vernets
26 May 1984	Zürich	Switzerland	Hallenstadion
27 May 1984	Zürich	Switzerland	Hallenstadion
28 May 1984	Paris	France	Palais Omnisports de Paris-Bercy
29 May 1984	Paris	France	Palais Omnisports de Paris-Bercy
30 May 1984	Paris	France	Palais Omnisports de Paris-Bercy
31 May 1984	Grenoble	France	Palais des Sports
2 June 1984 (Note: The 2 June 1984 concert in Ludwigshafen was part of SWF3 Festival.)	Ludwigshafen	West Germany	Südweststadion
4 June 1984	Orange	France	Théatre Antique d'Orange
5 June 1984	Nice	France	Palais des Congrès Acropolis
6 June 1984	Toulouse	France	Palais des Sports de Toulouse
8 June 1984	Madrid	Spain	Pabellón de Deportes
9 June 1984	Barcelona	Spain	Palau dels Esports de Barcelona
11 June 1984	Milan	Italy	Teatro Tenda di Lampugnano
12 June 1984	Milan	Italy	Teatro Tenda di Lampugnano
15 June 1984	Belfast	Northern Ireland	King's Hall
16 June 1984	Dublin	Ireland	RDS Arena
18 June 1984	Leeds	England	Queen's Hall
19 June 1984	Leeds	England	Queen's Hall
20 June 1984	Edinburgh	Scotland	Edinburgh Playhouse
21 June 1984	Edinburgh	Scotland	Edinburgh Playhouse
23 June 1984	Birmingham	England	National Exhibition Centre Arena
24 June 1984	Birmingham	England	National Exhibition Centre Arena
25 June 1984	Birmingham	England	National Exhibition Centre Arena
30 June 1984 (Note: The 30 June 1984 concert in London was part of the Summer of 84 Concert.)	London	England	Wembley Stadium

== Personnel ==
- Elton John – piano, lead vocals
- Davey Johnstone – guitars, backing vocals
- Dee Murray – bass guitar, backing vocals
- Nigel Olsson – drums, backing vocals
- Fred Mandel – keyboards, additional guitar, backing vocals
