= Night and Day Concert =

1984 concert by Elton John

The Night and Day Concert is a concert performed by Elton John on 30 June 1984 in the Wembley Stadium. It was broadcast live in full on BBC Radio 1, borrowing Radio 2's FM stereo frequencies.

Promoting John's Breaking Hearts album, the concert was videotaped for air on the Showtime cable channel, as well as commercial distribution and released on two VHS tapes: The Afternoon Concert ("The Breaking Hearts Tour") and "The Night Time Concert". Not all songs performed in the concert made it to video.

== Band ==
- Elton John - piano, vocals
- Dee Murray - bass, backing vocals
- Nigel Olsson - drums, backing vocals
- Davey Johnstone - guitars, backing vocals
- Fred Mandel - keyboards, additional guitars

== Set list ==
1. "Tiny Dancer"
2. "Hercules"
3. "Rocket Man"
4. "Daniel"
5. "Restless"
6. "Candle in the Wind"
7. "The Bitch Is Back"
8. "Don't Let The Sun Go Down On Me"
9. "Sad Songs (Say So Much)"
10. "Bennie and the Jets"
11. "Sorry Seems to Be the Hardest Word"
12. "Philadelphia Freedom"
13. "Medley: Blue Eyes/I Guess That's Why They Call It The Blues"
14. "Kiss the Bride"
15. "One More Arrow"
16. "Too Low For Zero"
17. "I'm Still Standing"
18. "Your Song"
19. "Saturday Night's Alright for Fighting"
20. "Goodbye Yellow Brick Road"
21. "Crocodile Rock"
22. "Medley: Whole Lotta Shakin' Goin On/I Saw Her Standing There/Twist and Shout"
