= Breaking Hearts Tour =

1984 concert tour by Elton John

- Continental tour by Elton John
- Poster to the concert in Landover, Maryland
- Location: North America
- Associated album: Breaking Hearts
- Start date: 17 August 1984
- End date: 18 November 1984
- Legs: 1
- No. of shows: 62

Elton John concert chronology
- European Express Tour (1984); Breaking Hearts Tour (1984); Ice on Fire Tour (1985–86)

Breaking Hearts Tour was the North American leg of the Elton John Breaking Hearts Tour. The European leg was dubbed "European Express". The tour started on 17 August 1984, at Tempe, Arizona. It included five sold-out concerts in New York City performed at Madison Square Garden.

== Tour ==
The North American leg of the tour began on 17 August 1984, at the ASU Activity Center in Tempe and ended 62 shows later at the USF Sun Dome in Tampa, Florida. The set list began with Tiny Dancer and included songs from John's latest album, including "Li’l Frigerator", "Restless", "Sad Songs (Say So Much)" and, occasionally, "Who Wears These Shoes".

One night in Madison Square Garden, John failed to stand up and was administered oxygen for half a minute; he went on with the show. "Bennie and the Jets", as usual, had snippets of "In the Mood", "Baby, You're a Rich Man", "Chattanooga Choo Choo" and "Charlie Brown Theme Song"; "Rocket Man", for its part, had "Close Encounters Theme" as a snippet by Davey Johnstone.

== Setlist ==
1. "Tiny Dancer"
2. "Levon"
3. "Lil 'Frigerator"
4. "Rocket Man"
5. "Daniel"
6. "Restless"
7. "Candle in the Wind"
8. "The Bitch Is Back"
9. "Don't Let the Sun Go Down On Me"
10. "Who Wears These Shoes" (added by 13 September in Toronto)
11. "Sad Songs (Say So Much)"
12. "Bennie and the Jets"
13. "Sorry Seems to be the Hardest Word" (Switched places with "Bennie and the Jets" starting by 28 September in Houston)
14. "Philadelphia Freedom"
15. "Blue Eyes"
16. "I Guess That's Why They Call It the Blues"
17. "Kiss the Bride"
18. "One More Arrow" (Dropped from the setlist after 5 November in Worcester)
19. "Too Low for Zero" (Dropped from the setlist after 29 September in Dallas)
20. "I'm Still Standing"
21. "Your Song"
22. "Saturday Night's Alright for Fighting"

Encores:

1. "Goodbye Yellow Brick Road"
2. "Crocodile Rock"
3. "Medley (incl. "Whole Lotta Shakin' Going On", "I Saw Her Standing There", "Twist and Shout")" (played on 29 September in Dallas only)

== Tour dates ==
Date	City	Country	Venue	Tickets sold / available	Revenue
North America
17 August 1984	Tempe	United States	ASU Activity Center	10,658 / 14,307	$157,248
18 August 1984	Tucson	United States	Tucson Convention Center	8,489 / 8,489	$127,335
19 August 1984	San Diego	United States	San Diego Sports Arena	11,240 / 14,259	$167,946
21 August 1984	Inglewood	United States	The Forum		
22 August 1984	Inglewood	United States	The Forum		
23 August 1984	Inglewood	United States	The Forum		
24 August 1984	Paradise	United States	Thomas & Mack Center	9,264 / 15,000	$138,960
25 August 1984	Irvine	United States	Irvine Meadows		
26 August 1984	Irvine	United States	Irvine Meadows		
28 August 1984	Daly City	United States	Cow Palace	14,500 / 14,500	$184,742
30 August 1984	Portland	United States	Portland Memorial Coliseum	12,095 / 12,110	$153,220
31 August 1984	Tacoma	United States	Tacoma Dome	24,197 / 24,364	$268,987
1 September 1984	Vancouver	Canada	Pacific Coliseum	15,543 / 15,543	$241,950
3 September 1984	Calgary	Canada	Olympic Saddledome	17,291 / 17,291	$268,908
4 September 1984	Edmonton	Canada	Northlands Coliseum	17,170 / 17,170	$267,948
6 September 1984	Provo	United States	Marriott Center		
7 September 1984	Denver	United States	McNichols Sports Arena	14,392 / 14,392	$213,996
9 September 1984	East Troy	United States	Alpine Valley Music Theatre		
11 September 1984	Rosemont	United States	Rosemont Horizon		
12 September 1984	Detroit	United States	Joe Louis Arena		
13 September 1984	Toronto	Canada	Maple Leaf Gardens		
15 September 1984	Cuyahoga Falls	United States	Blossom Music Center		
16 September 1984	Cuyahoga Falls	United States	Blossom Music Center		
18 September 1984	Saint Paul	United States	St. Paul Civic Center		
20 September 1984	Kansas City	United States	Kemper Arena		
21 September 1984	Lincoln	United States	Bob Devaney Sports Center		
22 September 1984	Ames	United States	Hilton Coliseum	10,100 / 15,000	
23 September 1984	Iowa City	United States	Carver–Hawkeye Arena	14,222 / 14,222	
25 September 1984	Oklahoma City	United States	Myriad Convention Center		
26 September 1984	Austin	United States	Frank Erwin Center		
28 September 1984	Houston	United States	The Summit		
29 September 1984	Dallas	United States	Reunion Arena		
30 September 1984	Baton Rouge	United States	LSU Assembly Center		
3 October 1984	Memphis	United States	Mid-South Coliseum		
5 October 1984	Chattanooga	United States	UTC Arena		
6 October 1984	Atlanta	United States	Omni Coliseum		
7 October 1984	Murfreesboro	United States	Murphy Center		
9 October 1984	Knoxville	United States	Stokely Athletic Center		
10 October 1984	Charlotte	United States	Charlotte Coliseum		
13 October 1984	Pembroke Pines	United States	Hollywood Sportatorium		
14 October 1984	Orlando	United States	Orange County Convention Center		
17 October 1984	Landover	United States	Capital Centre		
18 October 1984	Pittsburgh	United States	Civic Arena	14,205 / 16,000	
19 October 1984	Norfolk	United States	The Scope		
20 October 1984	Philadelphia	United States	The Spectrum		
23 October 1984	New York City	United States	Madison Square Garden		
24 October 1984	New York City	United States	Madison Square Garden		
25 October 1984	New York City	United States	Madison Square Garden		
26 October 1984	New York City	United States	Madison Square Garden		
28 October 1984	Philadelphia	United States	The Spectrum		
29 October 1984	New Haven	United States	New Haven Veterans Memorial Coliseum		
30 October 1984	Montréal	Canada	Forum de Montréal		
31 October 1984	Québec City	Canada	Colisée de Québec		
2 November 1984	Hartford	United States	Hartford Civic Center		
3 November 1984	Worcester	United States	The Centrum	36,660 / 36,660	$526,900
4 November 1984	Worcester	United States	The Centrum	36,660 / 36,660	$526,900
5 November 1984	Worcester	United States	The Centrum	36,660 / 36,660	$526,900
7 November 1984	Raleigh	United States	Reynolds Coliseum		
8 November 1984	Charlotte	United States	Charlotte Coliseum		
12 November 1984	New York City	United States	Madison Square Garden		
17 November 1984	Tampa	United States	USF Sun Dome	21,604 / 21,604	$310,830
18 November 1984	Tampa	United States	USF Sun Dome	21,604 / 21,604	$310,830

== Personnel ==
- Elton John – piano, lead vocals
- Davey Johnstone – guitars, backing vocals
- Dee Murray – bass guitar, backing vocals
- Nigel Olsson – drums, percussion, backing vocals
- Fred Mandel – keyboards, additional guitar, backing vocals
