= Elderberry Wine (song) =

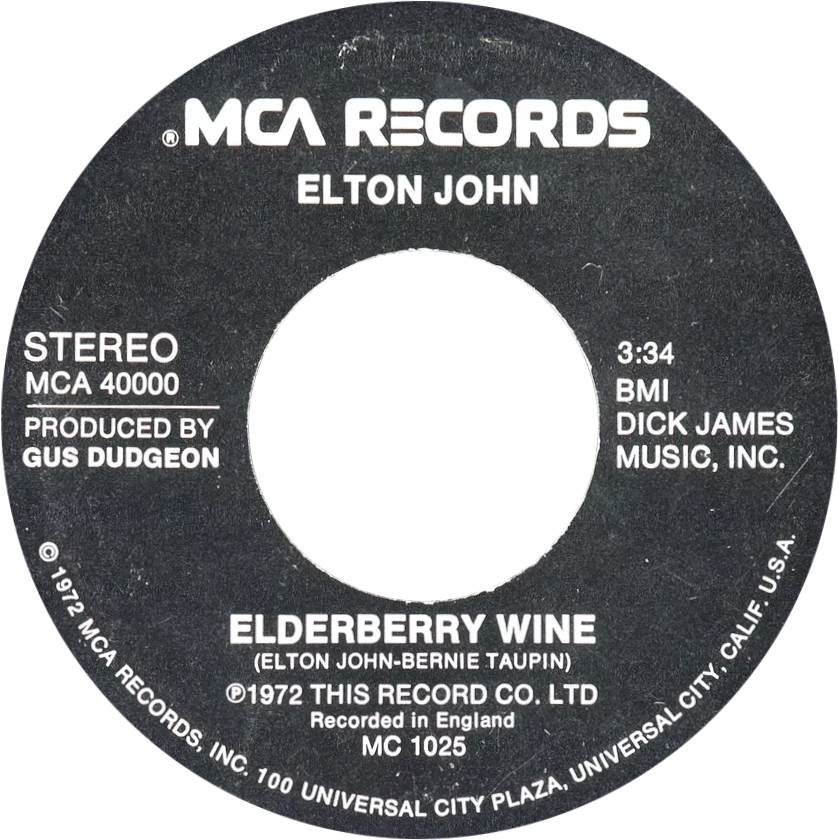
- Side B of the original US single

Single by Elton John

from the album Don't Shoot Me I'm Only the Piano Player
- A-side: "Crocodile Rock"
- Released: 27 October 1972 (UK); 20 November 1972 (USA)
- Recorded: June 1972, Château d'Hérouville, France
- Genre: Rock
- Length: 3:34
- Label: MCA (US); DJM (UK)
- Songwriters: Elton John, Bernie Taupin
- Producer: Gus Dudgeon

Elton John singles chronology
"Honky Cat" (1972)	"Crocodile Rock" / "Elderberry Wine" (1972)	"Daniel" (1973)

Official audio
- "Elderberry Wine" on YouTube

"Elderberry Wine" is a song written by English musician Elton John and songwriter Bernie Taupin, and performed by John. It was first released on John's 1973 album Don't Shoot Me I'm Only the Piano Player. It was also released as the B-side of John's No. 1 hit "Crocodile Rock" in October 1972. It was also popular on album-oriented rock radio stations. John played it live during his 1973 tour. It was covered by Irish-Scots singer Mae McKenna.

== Music and lyrics ==
"Elderberry Wine"'s music evokes nostalgia, and it has been described as a "retro rocker." AllMusic critic Stewart Mason describes it as a "straight-ahead piano-pounding rocker with gruff vocals and funky sax breaks," although Mason states that the song lacks the "retro trappings" of "Crocodile Rock." The instrumentation includes a brass instrument parts arranged by producer Gus Dudgeon and played by the horn players who also appeared on John's prior album Honky Chateau. Author Joseph Murrells suggests that the song has "a new rhythmic sound."

The lyrics are told by a man whose wife has left him. He misses her and recalls his happy days with her, but he mostly misses the fact that she was the one who could make the elderberry wine he used to enjoy with her. Mason suggests that the lyrics are "tongue in cheek silliness," and he considers the couplet:

You aimed to please me
Cooked black-eyed peas me

the worst of Taupin's career. Author Elizabeth Rosenthal points out the irony in the fact that the happy music is juxtaposed against lyrics about loneliness. She notes that this method of using music that sounds the opposite of the meaning of the words is a technique John used often on his prior album Honky Chateau. She also sees in this song a development in this technique from earlier songs that would continue through "All the Girls Love Alice" to the fully mature "Love Lies Bleeding."

== Reception ==
Although never released as an A-side, "Elderberry Wine" was popular on album-oriented rock radio stations. Allmusic critic Stephen Thomas Erlewine calls "Elderberry Wine" "as strong as anything John had recorded." AllMusic's Mason comments on the song's ongoing popularity. Elton John biographer David Buckley picks it out as a "strong cut." Mary Anne Cassata describes it as an "overlooked gem."

== Other appearances ==
"Elderberry Wine" was released as the B-side of "Crocodile Rock" in October 1972, prior to its appearance on Don't Shoot Me I'm Only the Piano Player. John played it live during his 1973 tour, and was the show opener at John's performance at the Royal Command Performance Variety Show on 7 September 1973, as well as his Madison Square Garden concert that same year. Subsequent to its initial release on Don't Shoot Me I'm Only the Piano Player, "Elderberry Wine" was released on several Elton John compilation albums, including Candle in the Wind in the UK 1978 and Your Songs in the US in 1986. An extended live jam of the song is a highlight in the much-bootlegged Christmas 1973 BBC performance from Hammersmith Odeon (released officially in 2014 as part of the 40th anniversary version of the Goodbye Yellow Brick Road album).

Celtic folk singer Mae McKenna recorded a cover version of "Elderberry Wine" on her self-titled album in 1975.

== Personnel ==
Track numbers refer to CD and digital releases of the album.

=== Musicians ===
- Elton John – vocals, acoustic piano
- Davey Johnstone – acoustic guitar, electric guitar and Leslie guitar
- Dee Murray – bass
- Nigel Olsson – drums
- Gus Dudgeon – brass arrangements
- Jean-Louis Chautemps – saxophone
- Alain Hatot – saxophone
- Jacques Bolognesi – trombone
- Ivan Jullien – trumpet

=== Production ===
- Producer – Gus Dudgeon
- Engineer – Ken Scott
- Remixed at Trident Studios (London, UK)
