= The Diving Board Tour =

2013–14 concert tour by Elton John

- Tour by Elton John
- Poster to the concert in Stockholm, Sweden
- Location: Europe • North America • South America
- Associated album: The Diving Board
- Start date: 8 November 2013
- End date: 28 February 2014
- Legs: 4
- No. of shows: 37

Elton John concert chronology
- 40th Anniversary of the Rocket Man (2012–13); The Diving Board Tour (2013–14); Follow the Yellow Brick Road Tour (2014)

The Diving Board Tour was a concert tour by British musician Elton John in North, South and Central America and Europe in promotion of John's 2013 album The Diving Board.

== Background ==
John performed in fourteen cities in the United States before traveling to Europe to perform ten concerts in Europe in the fall of 2013.

== Set list ==
1. "Funeral for a Friend/Love Lies Bleeding"
2. "Bennie and the Jets"
3. "Candle in the Wind"
4. "Grey Seal"
5. "Levon"
6. "Tiny Dancer"
7. "Holiday Inn"
8. "Mona Lisas and Mad Hatters"
9. "Believe"
10. "Philadelphia Freedom"
11. "Goodbye Yellow Brick Road"
12. "Rocket Man (I Think It's Going to Be a Long, Long Time)"
13. "Hey Ahab"
14. "I Guess That's Why They Call It the Blues"
15. "The One" (Solo)
16. "Oceans Away"
17. "Voyeur"
18. "Someone Saved My Life Tonight"
19. "Sad Songs (Say So Much)"
20. "All the Girls Love Alice"
21. "Home Again"
22. "Don't Let the Sun Go Down on Me"
23. "I'm Still Standing"
24. "The Bitch Is Back"
25. "Your Sister Can't Twist (But She Can Rock and Roll)"
26. "Saturday Night's Alright for Fighting"
  Encore
27. "Your Song"
28. "Crocodile Rock"
Additional notes
- "Home Again" not performed on 9 November (Providence, RI).
- "Voyeur" not performed on 14 November (Washington, DC).
4–7 September 2013
1. "The Bitch Is Back"
2. "Bennie and the Jets"
3. "Grey Seal"
4. "Levon"
5. "Tiny Dancer"
6. "Holiday Inn"
7. "Believe"
8. "Mona Lisas and Mad Hatters"
9. "Philadelphia Freedom"
10. "Candle in the Wind"
11. "Goodbye Yellow Brick Road"
12. "Rocket Man"
13. "Hey Ahab"
14. "I Guess That's Why They Call It the Blues"
15. "Funeral for a Friend/Love Lies Bleeding"
16. "Oscar Wilde Gets Out"
17. "Sad Songs (Say So Much)"
18. "Daniel"
19. "Sorry Seems to Be the Hardest Word"
20. "The One"
21. "Don't Let the Sun Go Down on Me"
22. "I'm Still Standing"
23. "Crocodile Rock"
24. "Saturday Night's Alright for Fighting"
  Encore
25. "Home Again"
26. "Your Song"
Bestival set list
1. "The Bitch Is Back"
2. "Benny and the Jets"
3. "Grey Seal"
4. "Levon"
5. "Tiny Dancer"
6. "Philadelphia Freedom"
7. "Goodbye Yellow Brick Road"
8. "Rocket Man"
9. "Hey Ahab"
10. "I Guess That's Why They Call It the Blues"
11. "Funeral for a Friend/Love Lies Bleeding"
12. "Candle in the Wind"
13. "Sad Songs (Say So Much)"
14. "Don't Let the Sun Go Down on Me"
15. "I'm Still Standing"
16. "Crocodile Rock"
17. "Saturday Night's Alright for Fighting"
  Encore
18. "Home Again"
19. "Your Song"
iTunes Festival set list
1. "The Bitch Is Back"
2. "Benny and the Jets"
3. "Levon"
4. "Tiny Dancer"
5. "Can't Stay Alone Tonight"
6. "Philadelphia Freedom"
7. "Oscar Wilde Gets Out"
8. "Mexican Vacation (Kids in the Candlelight)"
9. "Goodbye Yellow Brick Road"
10. "Rocket Man"
11. "Hey Ahab"
12. "Sorry Seems to Be the Hardest Word"
13. "Don't Let the Sun Go Down on Me"
14. "I'm Still Standing"
15. "Saturday Night's Alright for Fighting"
  Encore
16. "Home Again"
17. "Your Song"

== Tour dates ==
| Date | City | Country | Venue | Attendance | Box office |
North America
| 8 November 2013 | Bridgeport | United States | Webster Bank Arena | — | — |
| 9 November 2013 | Providence | United States | Dunkin' Donuts Center | — | — |
| 12 November 2013 | Boston | United States | TD Garden | — | — |
| 14 November 2013 | Washington, D.C. | United States | Verizon Center | 14,401 / 16,610 (87%) | $1,418,759 |
| 16 November 2013 | Atlanta | United States | Philips Arena | 14,846 / 14,846 (100%) | $1,163,425 |
| 18 November 2013 | Erie | United States | Erie Insurance Arena | — | — |
| 22 November 2013 | Saint Paul | United States | Xcel Energy Center | — | — |
| 23 November 2013 | Lincoln | United States | Pinnacle Bank Arena | — | — |
| 24 November 2013 | St. Louis | United States | Chaifetz Arena | — | — |
| 27 November 2013 | Philadelphia | United States | Wells Fargo Center | — | — |
| 29 November 2013 | Detroit | United States | Joe Louis Arena | — | — |
| 30 November 2013 | Rosemont | United States | Allstate Arena | — | — |
| 3 December 2013 | New York City | United States | Madison Square Garden | 36,196 / 36,196 (100%) | $3,852,856 |
| 4 December 2013 | New York City | United States | Madison Square Garden | 36,196 / 36,196 (100%) | $3,852,856 |
Europe
| 6 December 2013 | Moscow | Russia | Crocus City Hall | — | — |
| 7 December 2013 | Kazan | Russia | TatNeft Arena | — | — |
| 9 December 2013 | Paris | France | L'Olympia | — | — |
| 10 December 2013 | Paris | France | L'Olympia | — | — |
| 11 December 2013 | Paris | France | L'Olympia | — | — |
| 13 December 2013 | Stockholm | Sweden | Friends Arena | — | — |
| 14 December 2013 | Oslo | Norway | Oslo Spektrum | — | — |
| 16 December 2013 | Brussels | Belgium | Brussels Expo | — | — |
| 18 December 2013 | Prague | Czech Republic | O_{2} Arena | — | — |
| 19 December 2013 | Kaunas | Lithuania | Žalgiris Arena | — | — |
North America
| 1 February 2014 | Youngstown | United States | Covelli Centre | — | — |
| 3 February 2014 | London | Canada | Budweiser Gardens | 9,166 / 9,166 (100%) | $1,126,850 |
| 5 February 2014 | Montreal | Canada | Bell Centre | 14,381 / 14,381 (100%) | $1,316,800 |
| 6 February 2014 | Toronto | Canada | Air Canada Centre | 18,857 / 18,857 (100%) | $1,611,910 |
| 8 February 2014 | Hamilton | Canada | Copps Coliseum | — | — |
| 12 February 2014 | Oshawa | Canada | General Motors Centre | 6,301 / 6,301 (100%) | $795,682 |
| 13 February 2014 | Ottawa | Canada | Canadian Tire Centre | — | — |
South America
| 15 February 2014 | Quito | Ecuador | Arena Paseo San Francisco | — | — |
| 19 February 2014 | Rio de Janeiro | Brazil | HSBC Arena | 9,929 / 9,929 (100%) | $915,087 |
| 21 February 2014 | Goiânia | Brazil | Goiânia Arena | 10,658 / 12,315 (86%) | $703,874 |
| 22 February 2014 | Salvador | Brazil | Itaipava Arena Fonte Nova | 34,503 / 41,000 (84%) | $2,305,150 |
| 26 February 2014 | Fortaleza | Brazil | Castelão | 18,979 / 22,000 (86%) | $1,120,340 |
North America
| 28 February 2014 | La Romana | Dominican Republic | Altos de Chavón | 5,080 / 5,080 (100%) | $867,658 |
| Total | | | | 174,440 / 187,824 (93%) | $15,586,481 |

=== Cancellations and rescheduled shows ===
| 20 November 2013 | Columbus, Ohio | Nationwide Arena | Cancelled due to a scheduling conflict. |
| 21 February 2014 | Goiânia | Estádio Serra Dourada | Moved to Goiânia Arena. |

== Personnel ==
- Elton John – piano, vocals
- Davey Johnstone – guitar, banjo, backing vocals
- Matt Bissonette – bass guitar, backing vocals
- Kim Bullard – keyboards
- John Mahon – percussion, backing vocals
- Nigel Olsson – drums, backing vocals
- Luka Šulić – cello
- Stjepan Hauser – cello
- Lisa Stone – backing vocals
- Rose Stone – backing vocals
- Tata Vega – backing vocals
- Jean Witherspoon – backing vocals
