= Wonderful Crazy Night Tour =

2016–18 concert tour by Elton John

- World tour by Elton John
- Promotional poster
- Location: Asia • Europe • North America • Oceania • South America
- Associated album: Wonderful Crazy Night
- Start date: 13 January 2016
- End date: 1 July 2018
- Legs: 11
- No. of shows: 136

Elton John concert chronology
- The Final Curtain Tour (2015); Wonderful Crazy Night Tour (2016–18); Farewell Yellow Brick Road (2018–23)

Wonderful Crazy Night Tour was the 48th concert tour by British musician Elton John in Europe, North America, South America and Australia from 2016 to 2018.

== Background ==
On 20 October 2015, John's official website announced concerts taking place in Lincoln, Leicester and Exeter in the summer of 2016 under the banner of the Wonderful Crazy Night Tour in support of John's upcoming 32nd studio album. The previous day two intimate shows were announced in Paris. The poster for the two intimate Paris concerts effectively leaked information, including cover art and release dates for John's upcoming album before any official announcement was made. On 27 October 2015 five concerts were announced, taking place in Germany, directly before John's concerts in the United Kingdom.

== Set list ==
This set list is representative of the concert in Berlin, Germany on 7 July 2017. It does not represent the set list at all concerts for the duration of the tour.

1. "The Bitch Is Back"
2. "Bennie and the Jets"
3. "Take Me to the Pilot"
4. "Daniel"
5. "Looking Up"
6. "A Good Heart"
7. "Philadelphia Freedom"
8. "I Want Love"
9. "Tiny Dancer"
10. "Levon"
11. "Goodbye Yellow Brick Road"
12. "Rocket Man"
13. "Have Mercy on the Criminal"
14. "Your Song"
15. "Burn Down the Mission"
16. "Sad Songs (Say So Much)"
17. "Don't Let the Sun Go Down on Me"
18. "I'm Still Standing"
19. "Crocodile Rock"
20. "Your Sister Can't Twist (But She Can Rock 'n Roll)"
21. "Saturday Night's Alright for Fighting"

Encore

22. "Candle in the Wind"

== Tour dates ==
Date	City	Country	Venue	Attendance	Box office
North America (Note: Part of album launch concert series.)
13 January 2016	Los Angeles	United States	Wiltern Theatre	—N/a	—N/a
Europe
5 February 2016	Paris	France	L'Olympia	—N/a	—N/a
6 February 2016	Paris	France	L'Olympia	—N/a	—N/a
7 February 2016	Paris	France	L'Olympia	—N/a	—N/a
North America
9 March 2016	Estero	United States	Germain Arena	7,296 / 7,476	$845,293
11 March 2016	Johnson City	United States	Freedom Hall Civic Center	5,657 / 5,918	$625,494
12 March 2016	Chattanooga	United States	McKenzie Arena	10,094 / 10,715	$787,275
15 March 2016	Mobile	United States	Mobile Civic Center	9,227 / 9,459	$747,986
16 March 2016	Columbus	United States	Columbus Civic Center	9,064 / 9,415	$836,790
18 March 2016	Roanoke	United States	Berglund Center	8,482 / 9,174	$664,918
19 March 2016	Charlottesville	United States	John Paul Jones Arena	12,818 / 13,166	$1,102,888
22 March 2016	Youngstown	United States	Covelli Centre	6,979 / 7,231	$712,200
23 March 2016	Grand Rapids	United States	Van Andel Arena	11,270 / 11,508	$1,044,749
Middle East
26 May 2016	Tel Aviv	Israel	Yarkon Park	—N/a	—N/a
Europe
28 May 2016	Saint Petersburg	Russia	Ice Palace	—N/a	—N/a
30 May 2016	Moscow	Russia	Crocus City Hall	—N/a	—N/a
3 June 2016	Uelzen	Germany	Almased Arena	8,976 / 9,229	$714,341
4 June 2016	Erfurt	Germany	Domplatz Erfurt	9,266 / 9,311	$712,200
5 June 2016	Rastatt	Germany	Ehrenhof der Barockresidenz	—N/a	—N/a
7 June 2016	Frankfurt	Germany	Festhalle Frankfurt	6,258 / 6,656	$615,983
8 June 2016	Krefeld	Germany	König Palast	5,416 / 5,775	$490,661
10 June 2016	Lincoln	England	Lincolnshire Showground	—N/a	—N/a
11 June 2016	Leicester	England	Grace Road Cricket Ground	—N/a	—N/a
12 June 2016	Warminster	England	Longleat	—N/a	—N/a
14 June 2016	Liverpool	England	Echo Arena Liverpool	9,449 / 9,986	$1,099,602
18 June 2016 (Note: The 18 June 2016 concert in Oświęcim is a part of Life Festival Oświęcim.)	Oświęcim	Poland	Stadion Sportowy MOSIR	—N/a	—N/a
19 June 2016	Exeter	England	Westpoint Outdoor	—N/a	—N/a
25 June 2016	Edinburgh	Scotland	Meadowbank Stadium	—N/a	—N/a
26 June 2016 (Note: The 26 June 2016 concert in Woodstock is a part of Nocturne Festival.)	Woodstock	England	Blenheim Palace	—N/a	—N/a
30 June 2016	Ålesund	Norway	Color Line Stadion	—N/a	—N/a
1 July 2016	Trondheim	Norway	Sverresborg Arena	—N/a	—N/a
2 July 2016	Trondheim	Norway	Sverresborg Arena	—N/a	—N/a
4 July 2016	Aarhus	Denmark	Mindeparken	—N/a	—N/a
6 July 2016 (Note: The 6 July 2016 concert in Henley-on-Thames is a part of Henley Festival.)	Henley-on-Thames	England	River Thames Floating Stage	—N/a	—N/a
8 July 2016 (Note: The 8 July 2016 concert in Argelès-sur-Mer is a part of Les Déferlantes d'Argelès.)	Argelès-sur-Mer	France	Parc de Valmy	—N/a	—N/a
9 July 2016 (Note: The 9 July 2016 concert in Aix-les-Bains is a part of Musilac Music Festival.)	Aix-les-Bains	France	Lac du Bourget	—N/a	—N/a
10 July 2016 (Note: The 10 July 2016 concert in Albi is a part of Festival Pause Guitare.)	Albi	France	Cathédrale Sainte-Cécile d'Albi	—N/a	—N/a
12 July 2016	Pompeii	Italy	Amphitheatre of Pompeii	1,723 / 2,100	$300,713
14 July 2016 (Note: The 14 July 2016 concert in Porto is a part of Festival Marés Vivas.)	Vila Nova de Gaia	Portugal	Praia do Cabedelo	—N/a	—N/a
15 July 2016	Barolo	Italy	Piazza Colbert	6,476 / 8,100	$374,165
16 July 2016	Piazzola sul Brenta	Italy	Anfiteatro Camerini	7,664 / 7,664	$576,943
9 September 2016 (Note: The 9 September 2016 concert in Antalya is a part of Expo 2016.)	Antalya	Turkey	Antalya Kır Aktivite Alanı	—N/a	—N/a
11 September 2016 (Note: The 11 September 2016 concert in London is a part of BBC Radio 2 Live in Hyde Park.)	London	England	Hyde Park	—N/a	—N/a
18 September 2016 (Note: The 18 September 2016 concert in London is a part of the Apple Music Festival.)	London	England	The Roundhouse	—N/a	—N/a
North America
21 September 2016	Savannah	United States	Martin Luther King, Jr. Arena	6,931 / 7,165	$869,645
23 September 2016	Hershey	United States	Giant Center	10,921 / 11,322	$1,176,609
24 September 2016	Wilkes-Barre	United States	Mohegan Sun Arena at Casey Plaza	9,071 / 9,375	$934,208
27 September 2016	Allentown	United States	PPL Center	9,270 / 9,550	$1,036,850
28 September 2016	Toledo	United States	Huntington Center	8,242 / 8,477	$1,017,789
29 September 2016	London	Canada	Budweiser Gardens	9,766 / 9,766	$1,126,439
5 October 2016	Baton Rouge	United States	River Center Arena	10,152 / 10,414	$870,543
7 October 2016	Hidalgo	United States	State Farm Arena	6,742 / 6,899	$670,866
8 October 2016	Corpus Christi	United States	American Bank Center Arena	8,510 / 8,728	$747,778
Europe
9 November 2016	Merksem	Belgium	Lotto Arena	5,517 / 5,842	$537,470
10 November 2016	Malmö	Sweden	Malmö Arena	—N/a	—N/a
12 November 2016	Linköping	Sweden	Saab Arena	—N/a	—N/a
14 November 2016	Vilnius	Lithuania	Siemens Arena	—N/a	—N/a
15 November 2016	Riga	Latvia	Arena Riga	—N/a	—N/a
18 November 2016	Bremen	Germany	ÖVB Arena	7,836 / 8,314	$749,994
19 November 2016	Antwerp	Belgium	Lotto Arena	5,517 / 5,842	$537,470
22 November 2016	Amsterdam	Netherlands	Ziggo Dome	11,952 / 11,952	$681,588
24 November 2016	Vienna	Austria	Wiener Stadthalle	—N/a	—N/a
25 November 2016	Munich	Germany	Olympiahalle	11,196 / 11,665	$967,443
26 November 2016	Prague	Czech Republic	O_{2} Arena	—N/a	—N/a
29 November 2016	Clermont-Ferrand	France	Zénith d'Auvergne	—N/a	—N/a
2 December 2016	Belfast	Ireland	SSE Arena Belfast	—N/a	—N/a
3 December 2016	Newcastle	England	Metro Radio Arena	8,861 / 9,172	$665,656
5 December 2016	Rouen	France	Zénith de Rouen	—N/a	—N/a
8 December 2016	Zürich	Switzerland	Hallenstadion	9,500 / 9,500	$1,067,597
9 December 2016	Toulon	France	Zénith Oméga de Toulon	—N/a	—N/a
11 December 2016	Lisbon	Portugal	MEO Arena	—N/a	—N/a
North America
4 March 2017	Eugene	United States	Matthew Knight Arena	11,885 / 12,210	$1,152,210
5 March 2017	Spokane	United States	Spokane Veterans Memorial Arena	10,962 / 10,962	$952,863
7 March 2017	Bozeman	United States	Brick Breeden Fieldhouse	7,345 / 7,345	$756,658
8 March 2017	Missoula	United States	Adams Center	6,385 / 6,755	$816,605
11 March 2017	Victoria	Canada	Save-On-Foods Memorial Centre	—N/a	—N/a
12 March 2017	Victoria	Canada	Save-On-Foods Memorial Centre	—N/a	—N/a
15 March 2017	Casper	United States	Casper Events Center	6,210 / 6,210	$556,445
16 March 2017	Colorado Springs	United States	Broadmoor World Arena	9,081 / 9,081	$1,110,819
21 March 2017	Tucson	United States	Tucson Arena	8,199 / 8,199	$984,951
22 March 2017	Albuquerque	United States	Tingley Coliseum	10,864 / 10,864	$927,988
23 March 2017	El Paso	United States	Don Haskins Center	11,618 / 11,894	$1,058,979
South America (Note: Co-headlined with James Taylor.)
31 March 2017	Curitiba	Brazil	Pedreira Paulo Leminski	11,080 / 24,960	$1,342,402
1 April 2017	Rio de Janeiro	Brazil	Praça da Apoteose	14,253 / 35,560	$1,289,983
4 April 2017	Porto Alegre	Brazil	Anfiteatro do Beira Rio	17,987 / 24,877	$1,813,591
6 April 2017	São Paulo	Brazil	Allianz Parque	39,926 / 45,774	$4,139,104
10 April 2017	Santiago	Chile	Movistar Arena	10,110 / 11,404	$1,209,685
Europe
3 June 2017	London	England	Twickenham Stoop	—N/a	—N/a
4 June 2017	Derby	England	3aaa County Ground	—N/a	—N/a
7 June 2017	Birmingham	England	Genting Arena	7,285 / 10,829	$815,148
8 June 2017	Leeds	England	First Direct Arena	9,345 / 10,590	$897,806
10 June 2017	Blackburn	England	Ewood Park	—N/a	—N/a
11 June 2017	Peterborough	England	ABAX Stadium	—N/a	—N/a
13 June 2017	Kirchberg	Luxembourg	d'Coque	—N/a	—N/a
15 June 2017	Sønderborg	Denmark	Mølleparken	—N/a	—N/a
17 June 2017	Ipswich	England	Portman Road	—N/a	—N/a
18 June 2017	Widnes	England	Select Security Stadium	—N/a	—N/a
20 June 2017 (Note: The 20 June 2017 concert in Cork is a part of Live at the Marquee.)	Cork	Ireland	The Docklands	—N/a	—N/a
24 June 2017	Airdrie	Scotland	Excelsior Stadium	—N/a	—N/a
25 June 2017 (Note: The 25 June 2017 concert in Nantes was originally scheduled for 6 December 2016.)	Nantes	France	Zénith de Nantes Métropole	—N/a	—N/a
27 June 2017	Cologne	Germany	Lanxess Arena	9,376 / 11,000	$789,491
29 June 2017	Kristiansand	Norway	Scandic Kristiansand Bystranda	—N/a	—N/a
30 June 2017	Hamar	Norway	Hamar Stortorget	—N/a	—N/a
2 July 2017	Stockholm	Sweden	Gröna Lund Tivoli	—N/a	—N/a
5 July 2017	Mannheim	Germany	SAP Arena	9,448 / 9,448	$782,937
7 July 2017	Berlin	Germany	Mercedes-Benz Arena	11,226 / 12,039	$896,966
9 July 2017	Sopot	Poland	Opera Leśna	—N/a	—N/a
12 July 2017 (Note: The 12 July 2017 concert in Zürich is a part of Live at Sunset.)	Zürich	Switzerland	Dolder Kunsteisbahn	—N/a	—N/a
14 July 2017	Mantua	Italy	Piazza Sordello	7,232 / 8,000	$626,700
15 July 2017	Klagenfurt	Austria	Wörthersee Stadion	—N/a	—N/a
16 July 2017	Oberösterreich	Austria	Burg Clam	—N/a	—N/a
18 July 2017	Las Palmas	Spain	Gran Canaria Arena	—N/a	—N/a
20 July 2017 (Note: The 20 July 2017 concert in Marbella is a part of Starlite Festival.)	Marbella	Spain	Nagüeles Quarry Amphitheatre	—N/a	—N/a
Oceania
22 September 2017	Mackay	Australia	BB Print Stadium Mackay	14,231 / 14,675	$1,788,024
24 September 2017	Wollongong	Australia	WIN Stadium	20,285 / 21,455	$2,458,286
27 September 2017	Hobart	Australia	Derwent Entertainment Centre	9,738 / 10,322	$1,618,603
28 September 2017	Hobart	Australia	Derwent Entertainment Centre	9,738 / 10,322	$1,618,603
30 September 2017	Cairns	Australia	Cazaly's Stadium	21,986 / 25,000	$2,617,682
1 October 2017 (Note: The 1 October 2017 concert in the Yarra Valley is a part of the A Day on the Green festival series.)	Yarra Valley	Australia	Rochford Wines Yarra Valley	—N/a	—N/a
North America
10 November 2017	Moline	United States	iWireless Center	11,050 / 11,141	$1,113,041
11 November 2017	Evansville	United States	Ford Center	10,319 / 10,319	$1,058,661
14 November 2017	Kingston	Canada	Rogers K-Rock Centre	6,440 / 6,440	$844,471
15 November 2017	St. Catharines	Canada	Meridian Centre	6,455 / 6,455	$856,449
17 November 2017	Portland	United States	Cross Insurance Arena	7,806 / 7,983	$1,000,087
18 November 2017	Bangor	United States	Cross Insurance Center	6,873 / 6,975	$1,018,613
Eurasia
1 December 2017	Paris	France	AccorHotels Arena	12,839 / 14,459	$1,951,518
3 December 2017	Barcelona	Spain	Palau Sant Jordi	—N/a	—N/a
5 December 2017 (Note: The 5 December 2017 concert in Hamburg was originally scheduled for 8 July 2017, but was postponed due to airspace restrictions in Hamburg around the time of the 2017 G20 Hamburg summit.)	Hamburg	Germany	Barclaycard Arena	10,197 / 10,646	$1,014,484
6 December 2017	Monte Carlo	Monaco	Grimaldi Forum	—N/a	—N/a
8 December 2017 (Note: The 8 December 2017 concert in Dubai was originally scheduled for 15 December 2016, but was postponed to 20 January 2017 due to John catching flu. The concert was rescheduled for a second time due to John undergoing a medical procedure.)	Dubai	United Arab Emirates	Autism Rocks Amphitheatre	—N/a	—N/a
10 December 2017	Beirut	Lebanon	Forum de Beyrouth	—N/a	—N/a
12 December 2017	Toulouse	France	Zénith de Toulouse	—N/a	—N/a
14 December 2017	Moscow	Russia	Crocus City Hall	—N/a	—N/a
16 December 2017	Friedrichshafen	Germany	Rothaus Halle A1	7,119 / 7,183	$764,407
30 June 2018 (Note: The 30 June and 1 July 2018 concerts at the Black Sea Arena in Shekvetili, Georgia were originally scheduled for 16 and 17 September 2016, but were postponed due to Davey Johnstone's illness.)	Shekvetili	Georgia	Black Sea Arena	—N/a	—N/a
1 July 2018	Shekvetili	Georgia	Black Sea Arena	—N/a	—N/a
Total				651,254 / 727,920 (89.47%)	$66,935,803

== Cancelled shows ==
List of cancelled concerts, showing date, city, country, venue, and reason for cancellation
Date	City	Country	Venue	Reason
8 April 2017	Buenos Aires	Argentina	Hipódromo Argentino de Palermo	Poor weather
22 April 2017	Bakersfield	United States	Rabobank Arena	Originally scheduled for 18 March 2017, but postponed to 22 April 2017 due to John's illness, then cancelled due to John's hospitalisation.

== Personnel ==
- Matt Bissonette – bass guitar, backing vocals
- Kim Bullard – keyboards
- Ray Cooper – percussion
- Elton John – piano, vocals
- Davey Johnstone – guitar, banjo, backing vocals
- John Mahon – percussion, backing vocals
- Nigel Olsson – drums, backing vocals
