= The Final Curtain Tour =

2015 concert tour by Elton John

- National tour by Elton John
- Promotional poster
- Location: North America
- Start date: 8 August 2015
- End date: 10 October 2015
- Legs: 1
- No. of shows: 6
- Box office: $6,587,305

Elton John concert chronology
- All the Hits Tour (2015); The Final Curtain Tour (2015); Wonderful Crazy Night Tour (2016–18)

The Final Curtain Tour was a concert tour by British musician Elton John in North America in 2015.

== Background ==
John decided to wind down a 50-year career to focus on his family.

== Set list ==
This set list is representative of the performance on 3 October 2015 in Omaha, Nebraska, United States. It does not represent all concerts for the duration of the tour.

1. "Funeral for a Friend/Love Lies Bleeding"
2. "Bennie and the Jets"
3. "Candle in the Wind"
4. "All the Girls Love Alice"
5. "Levon"
6. "Tiny Dancer"
7. "Believe"
8. "Daniel"
9. "Philadelphia Freedom"
10. "Goodbye Yellow Brick Road"
11. "Rocket Man"
12. "Hey Ahab"
13. "I Guess That's Why They Call It the Blues"
14. "Mona Lisas and Mad Hatters"
15. "Your Song"
16. "Burn Down the Mission"
17. "Sad Songs (Say So Much)"
18. "Sorry Seems to Be the Hardest Word"
19. "Don't Let the Sun Go Down on Me"
20. "The Bitch Is Back"
21. "I'm Still Standing"
22. "Your Sister Can't Twist (But She Can Rock 'n Roll)"
23. "Saturday Night's Alright for Fighting"
  Encore
24. "Crocodile Rock"

== Tour dates ==
List of concerts, showing date, city, country, venue, tickets sold, number of available tickets and amount of gross revenue
Date	City	Country	Venue	Attendance	Box office
North America
8 August 2015	Lake Tahoe	United States	Harveys Outdoor Arena	7,514 / 7,514 (100%)	$1,168,615
2 October 2015	Sioux Falls	United States	Denny Sanford Premier Center	10,922 / 10,922 (100%)	$1,393,026
3 October 2015	Omaha	United States	CenturyLink Center Omaha	15,350 / 15,350 (100%)	$1,763,546
6 October 2015	Rapid City	United States	Rushmore Plaza Civic Center	8,856 / 8,856 (100%)	$644,607
7 October 2015	Billings	United States	Rimrock Auto Arena at MetraPark	11,583 / 11,583 (100%)	$816,292
10 October 2015	Boise	United States	Taco Bell Arena	11,271 / 11,271 (100%)	$801,219
Total				65,496 / 65,496 (100%)	$6,587,305

== Personnel ==
- Elton John – piano, vocals
- Davey Johnstone – guitar, banjo, backing vocals
- Matt Bissonette – bass guitar, backing vocals
- Kim Bullard – keyboards
- Ray Cooper – percussion
- John Mahon – percussion, backing vocals
- Nigel Olsson – drums, backing vocals
