= Follow the Yellow Brick Road Tour =

2014 concert tour by Elton John

- Tour by Elton John
- Poster to the concert in Brooklyn, New York
- Location: Europe • North America
- Associated album: Goodbye Yellow Brick Road (40th anniversary)
- Start date: 12 March 2014
- End date: 31 December 2014
- Legs: 5
- No. of shows: 60

Elton John concert chronology
- The Diving Board Tour (2013–14); Follow the Yellow Brick Road Tour (2014); All the Hits Tour (2015)

Follow the Yellow Brick Road Tour was a concert tour by British musician Elton John in North America and Europe in promotion of the 40th anniversary re-release of 1973's Goodbye Yellow Brick Road.

== Background ==
The tour to support the 40th anniversary re-release of 1973's Goodbye Yellow Brick Road started on 12 March 2014 in Beaumont, Texas and ended in December 2014 in New York City.

== Set list ==
1. "Funeral for a Friend/Love Lies Bleeding"
2. "Bennie and the Jets"
3. "Candle in the Wind"
4. "Grey Seal"
5. "Levon"
6. "Tiny Dancer"
7. "Holiday Inn"
8. "Mona Lisas and Mad Hatters"
9. "Believe"
10. "Philadelphia Freedom"
11. "Roy Rogers"
12. "Goodbye Yellow Brick Road"
13. "Rocket Man"
14. "Hey Ahab"
15. "I Guess That's Why They Call It the Blues"
16. "The One"
17. "Oceans Away"
18. "Someone Saved My Life Tonight"
19. "Sad Songs"
20. "All the Girls Love Alice"
21. "Home Again"
22. "Don't Let the Sun Go Down on Me"
23. "I'm Still Standing"
24. "The Bitch Is Back"
25. "Your Sister Can't Twist (But She Can Rock 'n Roll)"
26. "Saturday Night's Alright for Fighting"
  Encore
27. "Your Song"
28. "Crocodile Rock"

== Tour dates ==
List of concerts, showing date, city, country, venue, tickets sold, number of available tickets and amount of gross revenue
Date	City	Country	Venue	Attendance	Revenue
North America
12 March 2014	Beaumont	United States	Ford Arena	8,218 / 8,218	$764,418
13 March 2014	Dallas	United States	American Airlines Center	14,516 / 14,516	$1,387,432
15 March 2014	Birmingham	United States	BJCC Arena	—	—
16 March 2014	Pensacola	United States	Pensacola Bay Center	8,137 / 8,629	$791,152
19 March 2014	Tupelo	United States	BancorpSouth Arena	—	—
21 March 2014	New Orleans	United States	Smoothie King Center	15,138 / 16,251	$1,217,726
22 March 2014	Bossier City	United States	CenturyLink Center	12,992 / 12,992	$1,105,872
11 June 2014	Charleston	United States	Charleston Civic Center	—	—
12 June 2014	Virginia Beach	United States	Farm Bureau Live	—	—
14 June 2014	Charlotte	United States	PNC Music Pavilion	—	—
15 June 2014 (Note: The 15 June 2014 oncert in Manchester, Tennessee, at the Great Stage Park is a part of Bonnaroo Music Festival.)	Manchester	United States	Great Stage Park	—	—
Europe
21 June 2014	Leigh	England	Leigh Sports Village Stadium	16,445 / 16,578	$1,747,084
22 June 2014	St. Gallen	Switzerland	Kybunpark	—	—
24 June 2014	Nottingham	England	Capital FM Arena Nottingham	—	—
28 June 2014	Buckinghamshire	England	Stoke Park Country Club	—	—
29 June 2014	Colchester	England	Colchester Community Stadium	16,517 / 16,539	$1,805,166
2 July 2014	Newcastle	England	Metro Radio Arena	—	—
4 July 2014 (Note: The 4 July 2014 concert in Calella, Spain, at the Jardin Botanico del Cap Roig is a part of the Festival Jardins de Cap Roig.)	Calella	Spain	Jardín Botánico del Cap Roig	—	—
5 July 2014	Aalborg	Denmark	Skovdalen Atletikstadion	—	—
6 July 2014	Halle	Germany	Gerry Weber Stadion	6,921 / 7,087	$801,155
10 July 2014	Fulda	Germany	Fulda Domplatz	6,175 / 7,000	$622,401
11 July 2014	Dresden	Germany	Theaterplatz vor der Semperoper	—	—
12 July 2014	Kiel	Germany	Sparkassen-Arena	—	—
15 July 2014 (Note: The 15 July 2014 concert in Carcassonne, France, at the Théâtre Jean-Deschamps is a part of the Festival de Carcassonne.)	Carcassonne	France	Théâtre Jean-Deschamps	—	—
16 July 2014 (Note: The 16 July 2014 concert in Lyon, France, at the Theatre Romain Fourviere is a part of the Les Nuits de Fourvière.)	Lyon	France	Theatre Romain Fourviere	—	—
18 July 2014 (Note: The 18 July 2014 concert in Carhaix, France, at the La Prairie de Kerampuilh is a part of the Vieilles Charrues Festival.)	Carhaix	France	La Prairie de Kerampuilh	—	—
19 July 2014	Mainz	Germany	Nordmole Zollhafen	9,148 / 9,315	$987,924
20 July 2014	Mönchengladbach	Germany	Warsteiner HockeyPark	7,189 / 7,980	$801,872
22 July 2014 (Note: The 22 July 2014 concert in Regensburg, Germany, at the Schloss Thurn und Taxis is a part of the Thurn und Taxis Castle Festival.)	Regensburg	Germany	Schloss Thurn und Taxis	—	—
23 July 2014 (Note: The 23 July 2014 concert in Lorrach, Germany, at the Marktplatz Lorrach is a part of the Stimmen Festival.)	Lörrach	Germany	Marktplatz Lörrach	—	—
24 July 2014 (Note: The 24 July 2014 concert in Nyon, Switzerland, at the Nyon Festival Grounds is a part of the Paléo Festival.)	Nyon	Switzerland	Nyon Festival Grounds	—	—
26 July 2014 (Note: The 26 July 2014 concert in Monte Carlo, Monaco, at the Salle des Etoiles is a part of the Monte-Carlo Sporting Summer Festival.)	Monte Carlo	Monaco	Salle des Etoiles	—	—
North America
13 September 2014	Vancouver	Canada	Rogers Arena	—	—
14 September 2014	Vancouver	Canada	Rogers Arena	—	—
17 September 2014	Spokane	United States	Spokane Veterans Memorial Arena	—	—
19 September 2014	West Valley City	United States	Maverik Center	10,052 / 10,052	$707,188
20 September 2014	Denver	United States	Pepsi Center	14,570 / 14,570	$1,104,800
25 September 2014	Portland	United States	Moda Center	12,098 / 13,782	$1,192,072
27 September 2014	Seattle	United States	KeyArena	—	—
1 October 2014	Sacramento	United States	Sleep Train Arena	—	—
2 October 2014	San Jose	United States	SAP Center	14,519 / 14,896	$1,299,635
4 October 2014	Los Angeles	United States	Staples Center	32,182 / 32,182	$3,363,049
5 October 2014	Los Angeles	United States	Staples Center	32,182 / 32,182	$3,363,049
Europe
1 November 2014	Madrid	Spain	Palacio de Deportes de la Comunidad	—	—
2 November 2014	Bilbao	Spain	Bizkaia Arena	—	—
5 November 2014	Kraków	Poland	Kraków Arena	—	—
6 November 2014	Minsk	Belarus	Minsk-Arena	—	—
9 November 2014	Saint Petersburg	Russia	Ice Palace Saint Petersburg	—	—
10 November 2014	Helsinki	Finland	Hartwall Areena	—	—
12 November 2014	Copenhagen	Denmark	Forum Copenhagen	—	—
14 November 2014	Gothenburg	Sweden	Scandinavium	—	—
15 November 2014	Oslo	Norway	Oslo Spektrum	—	—
16 November 2014	Stavanger	Norway	Sørmarka Arena	—	—
19 November 2014	Paris	France	Palais Omnisports Paris Bercy	—	—
20 November 2014	Montpellier	France	Park&Suites Arena	—	—
22 November 2014	Lille	France	Zénith de Lille	—	—
24 November 2014	Hanover	Germany	TUI Arena	6,808 / 8,028	$629,937
27 November 2014	Munich	Germany	Olympiahalle	9,341 / 9,716	$887,076
29 November 2014	Nuremberg	Germany	Nuremberg Arena	5,578 / 5,837	$569,028
30 November 2014	Stuttgart	Germany	Hanns-Martin-Schleyer-Halle	7,648 / 8,043	$736,806
3 December 2014	Zürich	Switzerland	Hallenstadion	8,587 / 10,500	$971,668
4 December 2014	Milan	Italy	Mediolanum Forum	9,064 / 9,064	$785,800
6 December 2014	Barcelona	Spain	Palau Sant Jordi	—	—
9 December 2014	Dublin	Ireland	3Arena	—	—
North America
31 December 2014	Brooklyn	United States	Barclays Center	16,470 / 16,470	$3,097,229
Total				116,865 / 117,782	$10,841,354

== Personnel ==
- Elton John – piano, vocals
- Davey Johnstone – guitar, banjo, backing vocals
- Matt Bissonette – bass guitar, backing vocals
- Kim Bullard – keyboards
- John Mahon – percussion, backing vocals
- Nigel Olsson – drums, backing vocals
- Luka Šulić – cello
- Stjepan Hauser – cello
- Lisa Stone – backing vocals
- Rose Stone – backing vocals
- Tata Vega – backing vocals
- Jean Witherspoon – backing vocals
