= All the Hits Tour (Elton John) =

2015 concert tour by Elton John

- Tour by Elton John
- Promotional poster for tour
- Location: Asia • Europe • North America • Oceania • South America
- Start date: 10 January 2015
- End date: 19 December 2015
- Legs: 4
- No. of shows: 53

Elton John concert chronology
- Follow the Yellow Brick Road Tour (2014); All the Hits Tour (2015); The Final Curtain Tour (2015)

All the Hits Tour was a concert tour by British musician Elton John in North America, Europe and Oceania in 2015.

== Background ==
The first concert to be announced for the tour was a concert in Wellington, New Zealand. This will be John's nineteenth concert in New Zealand and his first concert in Wellington for nine years. A second concert was announced for Honolulu in January 2015. It was recently announced that Bright Light Bright Light will be the support act on the UK leg of the tour.

== Set list ==
1. "Funeral for a Friend/Love Lies Bleeding"
2. "Bennie and the Jets"
3. "Candle in the Wind"
4. "All the Girls Love Alice"
5. "Levon"
6. "Tiny Dancer"
7. "Believe"
8. "Daniel"
9. "Philadelphia Freedom"
10. "Goodbye Yellow Brick Road"
11. "Rocket Man (I Think It's Going to Be a Long, Long Time)"
12. "Hey Ahab"
13. "I Guess That's Why They Call It the Blues"
14. "The One"
15. "Your Song"
16. "Burn Down the Mission"
17. "Sad Songs (Say So Much)"
18. "Don't Let the Sun Go Down on Me"
19. "The Bitch Is Back"
20. "I'm Still Standing"
21. "Your Sister Can't Twist (But She Can Rock 'n Roll)"
22. "Saturday Night's Alright for Fighting"
23. "Crocodile Rock"

== Tour dates ==
List of concerts, showing date, city, country, venue, tickets sold, number of available tickets and amount of gross revenue
Date	City	Country	Venue	Attendance	Box office
North America
10 January 2015	Honolulu	United States	Neal S. Blaisdell Center	7,926 / 7,926 (100%)	$806,042
27 February 2015	Cincinnati	United States	U.S. Bank Arena	—N/a	—N/a
28 February 2015	Reading	United States	Santander Arena	—N/a	—N/a
4 March 2015	Huntsville	United States	Von Braun Center	—N/a	—N/a
6 March 2015	Miami	United States	American Airlines Arena	—N/a	—N/a
7 March 2015	Orlando	United States	Amway Center	—N/a	—N/a
10 March 2015	Augusta	United States	James Brown Arena	—N/a	—N/a
11 March 2015	Fayetteville	United States	Cumberland County Crown Coliseum	—N/a	—N/a
13 March 2015	Greenville	United States	Bon Secours Wellness Arena	—N/a	—N/a
14 March 2015	Jacksonville	United States	Jacksonville Veterans Memorial Arena	—N/a	—N/a
1 May 2015	The Woodlands	United States	Cynthia Woods Mitchell Pavilion	—N/a	—N/a
2 May 2015	New Orleans	United States	Fair Grounds Race Course	— (Note: The 2 May 2015 concert in New Orleans is a part of the Jazz & Heritage Festival.)	
Europe
31 May 2015	Kent	England	Kent Showground	—N/a	—N/a
6 June 2015	Colwyn Bay	Wales	Eirias Stadium	—N/a	—N/a
7 June 2015	Gloucester	England	Kingsholm Stadium	—N/a	—N/a
10 June 2015	Cardiff	Wales	Motorpoint Arena Cardiff	—N/a	—N/a
13 June 2015	Walsall	England	Banks's Stadium	—N/a	—N/a
14 June 2015	Crooklands	England	Westmorland County Showground	—N/a	—N/a
16 June 2015	Cornwall	England	The Eden Project	— (Note: The 16 & 17 June 2015 concert in Cornwall is a part of the Eden Sessions.)	
17 June 2015	Cornwall	England	The Eden Project	—	
19 June 2015	Glasgow	Scotland	The SSE Hydro	10,454 / 10,711 (98%)	$1,056,450
20 June 2015	Aberdeen	Scotland	AECC Outdoor Venue	—N/a	—N/a
23 June 2015	Vejle	Denmark	Vejle Musikteater	—N/a	—N/a
28 June 2015	Leipzig	Germany	Leipziger Messe	— (Note: The 28 June 2015 concert in Leipzig is a part of the Leipzig Trade Fair.)	
1 July 2015	Uppsala	Sweden	Botaniska Trädgården	—N/a	—N/a
3 July 2015	Bergen	Norway	Bergenhus Festning	—N/a	—N/a
4 July 2015	Larvik	Norway	Golf Arena	— (Note: The 4 July 2015 concert in Larvik is a part of the Stavernfestivalen.)	
6 July 2015	Copenhagen	Denmark	Tivoli Gardens	—N/a	—N/a
11 July 2015	Lucca	Italy	Piazza Napoleone	— (Note: The 11 July 2015 concert in Lucca is a part of the Lucca Summer Festival.)	
12 July 2015	Rome	Italy	Terme di Caracalla	—N/a	—N/a
15 July 2015	Málaga	Spain	Palacio José María Martín Carpena	—N/a	—N/a
17 July 2015	Gijón	Spain	Las Mestas Sports Complex	—N/a	—N/a
18 July 2015	Andorra la Vella	Andorra	Poliesportiu d'Andorra	—N/a	—N/a
20 July 2015	Madrid	Spain	Teatro Real	— (Note: The 20 July 2015 concert in Madrid is a part of the Universal Music Festival.)	
The Americas
9 August 2015	San Francisco	United States	Golden Gate Park	— (Note: The 9 August 2015 concert in San Francisco is a part of Outside Lands Festival.)	
19 September 2015	Atlanta	United States	Piedmont Park	— (Note: The 19 September 2015 concert in Atlanta is a part of Music Midtown.)	
20 September 2015	Rio de Janeiro	Brazil	New City of Rock	— (Note: The 20 September 2015 concert in Rio de Janeiro is a part of "Rock in Rio VI".)	
25 October 2015	Austin	United States	Austin360 Amphitheater	— (Note: The 25 October 2015 concert in Austin is a part of the 2015 United States Grand Prix.)	
Australasia
16 November 2015	Osaka	Japan	Osaka-jō Hall	—N/a	—N/a
18 November 2015	Yokohama	Japan	Yokohama Arena	—N/a	—N/a
21 November 2015	Wellington	New Zealand	Westpac Stadium	—N/a	—N/a
24 November 2015	Hong Kong	China	Hong Kong Convention and Exhibition Centre	—N/a	—N/a
27 November 2015	Seoul	South Korea	Hyundai Card Understage	—N/a	—N/a
29 November 2015	Bangkok	Thailand	IMPACT Arena	—N/a	—N/a
1 December 2015	Dover	Singapore	The Star Performing Arts Centre	—N/a	—N/a
2 December 2015	Dover	Singapore	The Star Performing Arts Centre	—N/a	—N/a
5 December 2015	Hunter Valley	Australia	Hope Estate Winery	—N/a	—N/a
8 December 2015	Brisbane	Australia	Brisbane Entertainment Centre	9,713 / 10,485 (93%)	$1,360,670
11 December 2015	Melbourne	Australia	Rod Laver Arena	—N/a	—N/a
12 December 2015	Geelong	Australia	Mount Duneed Estate	—N/a	—N/a
15 December 2015	Adelaide	Australia	Adelaide Entertainment Centre	—N/a	—N/a
17 December 2015	Sydney	Australia	Hordern Pavilion	3,127 / 3,194 (98%)	$554,724
19 December 2015	Sydney	Australia	Sydney Entertainment Centre	10,237 / 10,237 (100%)	$1,414,330
Total				41,457 / 42,553 (97%)	$5,192,216

== Personnel ==
- Elton John – piano, vocals
- Davey Johnstone – guitar, banjo, backing vocals
- Matt Bissonette – bass guitar, backing vocals
- Kim Bullard – keyboards
- John Mahon – percussion, backing vocals
- Nigel Olsson – drums, backing vocals
