= Jef Gilson =

French musician (1926–2012)

Jean-François Quiévreux (25 July 1926 – 5 February 2012), better known as Jef Gilson, was a French clarinetist, pianist, arranger, vocalist, composer and big band leader.

"In the occupation of which he initiated groups" proved Gilson "an excellent grasp of the 'discovery' and the promotion of young talent."

== Life and work ==
Classically trained as a clarinetist, Gilson began playing with Claude Luter in the band of Boris Vian. In 1947 he switched to the piano.

He formed a big band in 1963, members of which included, at various stages, Bill Coleman, Bernard Vitet, Ivan Jullien, Michel Portal, Jean-Louis Chautemps, François Jeanneau, Michel Portal, Jean-Luc Ponty, Bernard Lubat, Lloyd Miller and Henri Texier. Woody Shaw and Nathan Davis performed and recorded with the orchestra in spring 1965.

In addition, in 1965 he joined the vocal sextet Les Double Six, first as and a member, later as its musical director.

Gilson's recordings, on which early compositions with tempo changes (Enfin!, Œil Vision), bitonal layers and chromatic topics are included, first appeared on a mini label. Some of the harmonic function has been overridden in his compositions since 1964, without, being exclusively free jazz oriented (New Call from France, MPS 1966). Commercial success did not materialize, so that in 1968 Gilson temporarily went to Madagascar. In 1971 he returned and concentrated first on ethno jazz and later "total improvisation". In 1973 he founded his label, Palm, on which are especially the recordings with his orchestra Europamerica, and with Butch Morris. For this more arranged record, which started reflecting his achievements of free jazz, he was awarded the 1978 Prix Boris Vian. Up to his final days he lived withdrawn in Ardèche.

== Bibliography ==
- Ekkehard Jost, Europas Jazz. 1960–1980. Frankfurt a.M. 1987, ISBN 3-596-22974-X
