= I Think I'm Going to Kill Myself =

Song by Elton John

from the album Honky Château
- Released: 19 May 1972
- Recorded: January 1972
- Genre: Rock, honky tonk, dance hall
- Length: 3:35
- Label: DJM Records; Uni Records (US/Canada)
- Songwriters: Elton John, Bernie Taupin
- Producer: Gus Dudgeon

Audio
- "I Think I'm Going to Kill Myself" by Elton John on YouTube

"I Think I'm Going to Kill Myself" is a song written by English musician Elton John and songwriter Bernie Taupin, and performed by John. The song was released on the 1972 album Honky Château, and is a tongue-in-cheek parody of a moody teenager's thoughts about suicide.

== Composition ==
The song maintains the New Orleans atmosphere from "Honky Cat", the opening track of Honky Château, with a jazzy style that Elizabeth Rosenthal describes as "an amusing ditty". Author Philip Norman describes it as "a cheerful little thing", but AllMusic critic Stephen Thomas Erlewine calls it "surprisingly cynical and nasty". Mary Anne Cassata calls it "a jumpy pop tune", like "Honky Cat", and an "ode to teenage lust". The book Songwriting for Dummies described the song as "a deceptively happy ditty" and an example where the lyrical content contrasts with the music.

It opens with an upbeat piano, with accompanying bass licks and fast-paced drumming, stirring up a situation image. The chorus continues this, before briefly turning into a slow-paced doo-wop choir, accompanied by a smooth acoustic guitar, singing the word "blues". After that, it returns to its main tempo. Later, a honky-tonk piano solo accompanied by tap dancing is present, with the song switching in and out of the slow-paced "blues" before fading out. "Legs" Larry Smith performed the tap dancing routine on the track.

== Performances ==
It was premiered in 1972, both with and without "Legs" Larry Smith, who also did the tap dancing on the album. Smith performed the tap dance on stage during the American leg of the 1972 tour, which began on 26 September, with Smith sometimes wearing a wedding dress. Smith also performed on the song at the London Palladium for the Royal Command Performance Variety Show on 30 October. After that tour, it was not played until returning as a solo piece in 1976, and on the 1979 tour with Ray Cooper. The second tour with Ray Cooper (1993–95) also featured this song, and it was also featured in his 2009–12 tour with Cooper. It has not been played solo since 1976.

== Personnel ==
- Elton John – vocals, piano
- Dee Murray – bass, backing vocals
- Nigel Olsson – drums, backing vocals
- Davey Johnstone – guitar, backing vocals
- "Legs" Larry Smith – tap dancing
