= All the Hits =

All the Hits may refer to:

- All the Hits (Keith Martin album), 2003
- All the Hits (Bonnie Tyler album), 2013
- All the Hits Tour (Elton John), a 2015 concert tour by Elton John
- All the Hits Tour (Lionel Richie and Mariah Carey), a 2017 concert tour by Lionel Richie and Mariah Carey
- The Killer at His Best – All the Hits, a 1984 album by Eddy Grant

== See also ==
- All Hits, a 2001 album by All Saints
