= Don't Shoot Me I'm Only the Piano Player =

1973 album by Elton John

Studio album by Elton John
- Released: 26 January 1973
- Recorded: 10–19 June 1972
- Studios: Château d'Hérouville, Hérouville, France; mixed at Trident, London
- Genre: Pop rock
- Length: 42:45
- Labels: MCA (US); DJM (UK)
- Producer: Gus Dudgeon

Elton John chronology
Honky Château (1972)	Don't Shoot Me I'm Only the Piano Player (1973)	Goodbye Yellow Brick Road (1973)

Singles from Don't Shoot Me I'm Only the Piano Player
- 1. "Crocodile Rock" Released: 27 October 1972; 2. "Daniel" Released: 20 January 1973

Don't Shoot Me I'm Only the Piano Player is the sixth studio album by British musician Elton John. Released on 26 January 1973 by DJM Records, it was the first of two studio albums he released in 1973 (the second was Goodbye Yellow Brick Road, released nine months later), and was his second straight No. 1 album on the US Billboard 200 and first No. 1 album on the UK Albums Chart.

The lead single "Crocodile Rock" yielded John his first No. 1 single in both the US and Canada. "Daniel" was also a major hit from the album, giving him his second Canadian No. 1 single on the RPM Top Singles Chart and No. 2 on the US Billboard Hot 100 and reaching No. 4 on the UK singles chart, one place higher than achieved by "Crocodile Rock".

== Background ==
By 1972, John had experienced increasing commercial success following the release of Honky Château and its lead single "Rocket Man", with the single reaching the top 10 in both the US and UK and the album topping the US charts. The album was his first to be entirely recorded with the Elton John Band, consisting of Dee Murray on bass, Nigel Olsson on drums and Davey Johnstone on guitar; this band would also accompany him on the album's corresponding tour.

== Reception ==
Professional ratings
Review scores
Source	Rating
AllMusic	4/5 stars
Christgau's Record Guide	C+
The Encyclopedia of Popular Music	3/5 stars
Tom Hull – on the Web	B

Stephen Holden of Rolling Stone considered the record to be "as good, if not better" than the preceding Honky Château, highlighting "Daniel", "Have Mercy on the Criminal" and "Crocodile Rock" as successful "excursions in fantasy-nostalgia". Beat Instrumental praised the "tasteful" playing of the backing musicians and highlighted John's ability to "capture the true spirit and feel of American music". Record Mirror's Val Mabbs similarly lauded John's bandmates; he also noted the album's ability to appeal to a wide audience without compromising John's "own feel". Robert Christgau was more negative in his 1981 Record Guide, criticizing Taupin for "refus[ing] to outgrow his pistol envy" and John for "mak[ing] the music not-with-a-bang-but-a-whimper."

== Track listing ==
All tracks are written by Elton John and Bernie Taupin.

Side one
No.	Title	Length
1.	"Daniel"	3:55
2.	"Teacher I Need You"	4:10
3.	"Elderberry Wine"	3:34
4.	"Blues for Baby and Me"	5:39
5.	"Midnight Creeper"	3:52

Side two
No.	Title	Length
6.	"Have Mercy on the Criminal"	5:58
7.	"I'm Going to Be a Teenage Idol"	3:56
8.	"Texan Love Song"	3:33
9.	"Crocodile Rock"	3:55
10.	"High Flying Bird"	4:12
Total length:		42:45

Bonus tracks (1995 Mercury and 1996 Rocket reissue)
No.	Title	Length
11.	"Screw You (Young Man's Blues)"	4:43
12.	"Jack Rabbit"	1:50
13.	"Whenever You’re Ready (We’ll Go Steady Again)"	2:51
14.	"Skyline Pigeon" (Piano version)	3:56
Total length:		56:23

== Personnel ==
Track numbers refer to CD and digital releases of the album.

=== Musicians ===
- Elton John – vocals, Fender Rhodes (1, 5), Mellotron (1, 2), acoustic piano (2–4, 6, 7, 9, 10), Leslie piano (7) harmonium (8), Farfisa organ (9)
- Ken Scott – ARP synthesizer (1)
- Davey Johnstone – acoustic guitar, electric guitar and Leslie guitar (All tracks); banjo (1), backing vocals (2, 7, 10, 12), sitar (4), mandolin (8)
- Dee Murray – bass (All tracks), backing vocals (2, 7, 10, 12)
- Nigel Olsson – drums (All tracks), maracas (1), backing vocals (2, 7, 10, 12)
- Gus Dudgeon – brass arrangements (3, 5, 7)
- Paul Buckmaster – orchestral arrangements (4, 6)
- Jean-Louis Chautemps – saxophone (3, 5, 7)
- Alain Hatot – saxophone (3, 5, 7)
- Jacques Bolognesi – trombone (3, 5, 7)
- Ivan Jullien – trumpet (3, 5, 7)

=== Production ===
- Producer – Gus Dudgeon
- Engineer – Ken Scott
- Remixed at Trident Studios (London, UK)
- Coordinator – Steve Brown
- Art direction and sleeve design – David Larkham and Michael Ross
- Cover photo – Ed Caraeff
- Booklet photography – Ed Caraeff, Bryan Forbes, Maxine Taupin and Michael Ross

== Charts ==
=== Weekly charts ===
Chart (1973–1975)	Peak position
Australian Albums (Kent Music Report)	1
Canada Top Albums/CDs (RPM)	1
Denmark (Danish Albums Chart)	4
Dutch Albums (Album Top 100)	2
Finnish Albums (The Official Finnish Charts)	2
German Albums (Offizielle Top 100)	12
Italian Albums (Musica e Dischi)	1
Japanese Albums (Oricon)	4
Norwegian Albums (VG-lista)	1
Spanish Albums (Spanish Albums Chart)	1
UK Albums (Official Charts)	1
US Billboard 200	1

Chart (2023–2025)	Peak position
Greek Albums (IFPI)	96
Scottish Albums (Official Charts)	46

=== Year-end charts ===
Chart (1973)	Position
Australian Albums Kent Music Report	4
Dutch Albums (Album Top 100)	17
German Albums (Ofizielle Top 100)	35
Italian Albums	4
UK Albums (OCC)	1
Billboard Year-End Charts	8

Chart (1974)	Position
Billboard Year-End Charts	67

Chart (1975)	Position
Danish Album Charts	18

== Certifications ==
Region	Certification	Certified units/sales
Australia (ARIA)	3× Platinum	150,000^{^}
United Kingdom (BPI)	Gold	100,000^{^}
United States (RIAA)	3× Platinum	3,000,000^{^}
^{^} Shipments figures based on certification alone.
