= Breaking Hearts =

Studio album by Elton John
- Released: 18 June 1984
- Recorded: December 1983 – April 1984
- Studios: AIR, Montserrat
- Genre: Pop rock
- Length: 40:43
- Labels: Geffen (US), Rocket (UK)
- Producer: Chris Thomas

Elton John chronology
| Too Low for Zero (1983) | Breaking Hearts (1984) | Ice on Fire (1985) |

Singles from Breaking Hearts
- 1. "Sad Songs (Say So Much)" Released: May 1984; 2. "Passengers" Released: August 1984; 3. "Who Wears These Shoes?" Released: October 1984; 4. "In Neon" Released: November 1984; 5. "Breaking Hearts" Released: February 1985

Breaking Hearts is the eighteenth studio album by British musician Elton John. It was released on 18 June 1984 through John's Rocket label in the UK and Geffen Records in the US. Like the preceding Too Low for Zero (1983), the album was produced by Chris Thomas and features the classic Elton John Band lineup of Davey Johnstone on guitar, Dee Murray on bass, and Nigel Olsson on drums.

Upon release, Breaking Hearts was a commercial success, peaking at number two in the UK and number 20 in the US. "Sad Songs (Say So Much)" was released as the album's lead single and reached number five in the US and number seven in the UK. Four further singles were released, including "Passengers", which reached number five in the UK, as well as "Who Wears These Shoes?" and "In Neon", both of which reached the top 40 in the US.

== Background ==
This album would be the last to feature all (core) members of the "classic Elton John Band lineup" playing their instruments (although they would reunite to provide backing vocals on John's Reg Strikes Back album). It was the last of Elton John's studio albums to feature bass from Dee Murray, who would die in 1992 of skin cancer, and it was the last studio album until 2001's Songs from the West Coast that would feature Nigel Olsson on drums. It was also the last recorded album in which John played both piano and keyboards in the studio by himself.

Breaking Hearts was also the first album since Victim of Love to not feature a string or horn section on any track. This is one of only two albums with John's classic band to which (unofficial member) Ray Cooper did not contribute at all, the other being 1973's Don't Shoot Me I'm Only the Piano Player. Shortly after the tour, the band line-up would change and Gus Dudgeon, John's former producer, would produce the next two albums. In the US, it was certified gold in September 1984 and platinum in August 1998 by the RIAA.

John has continued performing "Sad Songs (Say So Much)" as of 2023, as he included the song in his Farewell Yellow Brick Road Tour setlist. Apart from the 1984 Breaking Hearts Tour (both the European and the North American leg), no other songs from the album have been performed live except "Restless" and "Passengers", on the following 1985–1986 Ice on Fire World Tour (the latter song only performed on the UK leg).

== Music and lyrics ==
In comparison with John's previous albums, the music on Breaking Hearts features greater emphasis on Johnstone's guitar as opposed to John's piano, while John utilized the synthesizer to a greater extent.

== Release and reception ==
=== Commercial performance ===
Upon release, Breaking Hearts continued the success of its predecessor. Its first single, "Sad Songs (Say So Much)", charted in the UK on May 26, and ended up peaking at number seven, making it John's third UK top 10 hit in the span of a year. In the US, the single debuted at number 49 (John's highest single debut of the decade) and made it to the top 40 within two weeks. By July, it had entered the top 10, and on August 11, it reached its peak of number five. This marked the first time since 1975 that John had two singles in a row reach the top 10 in the US.

=== Critical reception ===
Professional ratings
Review scores
| Source | Rating |
|---|---|
| AllMusic | 3/5 stars |
| The Encyclopedia of Popular Music | 2/5 stars |
| Record Mirror | 1/5 stars |
| Smash Hits | 3/10 |
| Sounds | 2/5 stars |

Initial reviews for Breaking Hearts were negative. Robin Smith of Record Mirror rated the album one star out of five, lamenting how "a man of Reg's character could turn his hands to such a boring record." Smith felt the majority of the record consisted of "Taupin's by now over-familiar cowboy songs", and stated that while John "does his best with the material", the rest of the musicians "sound very disinterested." Tom Hibbert of Smash Hits categorized its songs as "plodding 'rockers'" and "tawdry ballads" with "clichéd arrangements and snoozy singing of lyrics as trite as can be". Musician felt that while John's melodies hadn't "lost their pop sense", they had lost their "effervescence"; the magazine also criticized Taupin's "misogynistic" lyrics. A more positive review in Cash Box declared the album to be a "substantial LP" which "hearken[s] back to the heyday of Captain Fantastic". The magazine described "Sad Songs (Say So Much)" as "poignant and touching" and the title track as "beautifully melodic", while listing "'Lil Frigerator" and "Passengers" as further highlights.

Retrospective reviews are more positive. Lindsey Planer of AllMusic declared the album to be "one of John's most consistent efforts during his half decade on Geffen Records", though he lamented the fact that the record's "lighter pop" tracks such as "In Neon" and "Passengers" "criminally under-utilized the synergy between the artist and band." Ultimate Classic Rock stated that the album "capture[s] a moment that found John happily reunited with his longtime songwriting partner and surrounded with some of the musicians who'd helped create his biggest hits", noting that while "it doesn't contain many of the delirious highlights fans had come to expect from [John's] best albums", it is also devoid of "most of the traps that would ensnare him later in the decade."

== Track listing ==
All tracks are written by Elton John and Bernie Taupin, except where noted.

Side one
| No. | Title | Length |
|---|---|---|
| 1. | "Restless" | 5:17 |
| 2. | "Slow Down Georgie (She's Poison)" | 4:10 |
| 3. | "Who Wears These Shoes?" | 4:04 |
| 4. | "Breaking Hearts (Ain't What It Used to Be)" | 3:34 |
| 5. | "Li'l 'Frigerator" | 3:37 |

Side two
| No. | Title | Length |
|---|---|---|
| 1. | "Passengers" (John, Taupin, Davey Johnstone, Phineas Mkhize) | 3:24 |
| 2. | "In Neon" | 4:19 |
| 3. | "Burning Buildings" | 4:02 |
| 4. | "Did He Shoot Her?" | 3:21 |
| 5. | "Sad Songs (Say So Much)" | 4:55 |
| Total length: | | 40:43 |

- Sides one and two were combined as tracks 1–10 on CD reissues.

== Personnel ==
Track numbering refers to CD and digital releases of the album.

=== Musicians ===
- Elton John – lead and backing vocals, synthesizers (tracks 1–3, 5–7, 9, 10), pianos (tracks 3–5, 7–10), Hammond organ (track 5), Fender Rhodes (track 7), clavinet (track 10)
- Davey Johnstone – backing vocals (tracks 1–4, 6–10), electric guitar (tracks 1–3, 5, 7–9), acoustic guitar (tracks 2, 6–8, 10), sitar (track 9)
- Dee Murray – bass guitar (tracks 1–3, 5–10), backing vocals (tracks 1–4, 6–10)
- Nigel Olsson – drums (tracks 1–3, 5–10), backing vocals (tracks 1–4, 6–10)
- Andrew Thompson – saxophone (track 5)

=== Production ===
- Chris Thomas – producer
- Renate Blauel – recording
- Tim Young – mastering (UK)
- Greg Fulginiti – mastering (US)
- David Costa – art direction, design
- Richard Young – photography
- Patrick Jones – band photography
- Herb Ritts – Bernie Taupin photo

== Charts ==
=== Weekly charts ===
Weekly chart performance for Breaking Hearts
| Chart (1984–1985) | Peak position |
|---|---|
| Australian Albums (Kent Music Report) | 1 |
| Austrian Albums (Ö3 Austria) | 4 |
| Canada Top Albums/CDs (RPM) | 10 |
| Dutch Albums (Album Top 100) | 41 |
| German Albums (Offizielle Top 100) | 5 |
| Japanese Albums (Oricon) | 54 |
| New Zealand Albums (RMNZ) | 2 |
| Norwegian Albums (VG-lista) | 7 |
| Spanish Albums (AFYVE) | 5 |
| Swedish Albums (Sverigetopplistan) | 11 |
| Swiss Albums (Schweizer Hitparade) | 1 |
| UK Albums (Official Charts) | 2 |
| US Billboard 200 | 20 |

=== Year-end charts ===
Year-end chart performance for Breaking Hearts
| Chart (1984) | Position |
|---|---|
| Australian Albums (Kent Music Report) | 16 |
| Austrian Albums (Ö3 Austria) | 26 |
| Canada Top Albums/CDs (RPM) | 42 |
| Japanese Albums (Oricon) | 98 |
| New Zealand Albums (RMNZ) | 46 |
| Swiss Albums (Swiss Hitparade) | 11 |
| UK Albums (OCC) | 33 |

== Certifications ==
Certifications for Breaking Hearts
| Region | Certification | Certified units/sales |
|---|---|---|
| New Zealand (RMNZ) | Platinum | 15,000^{^} |
| Spain (Promusicae) | Gold | 50,000^{^} |
| Switzerland (IFPI Switzerland) | Gold | 25,000^{^} |
| United Kingdom (BPI) | Gold | 240,000 |
| United States (RIAA) | Platinum | 1,000,000^{^} |
^{^} Shipments figures based on certification alone.
