= Here and There (Elton John album) =

Live album by Elton John
- Released: 30 April 1976
- Recorded: Here; The Royal Festival Hall, London, 18 May 1974; There; Madison Square Garden, New York City, Thanksgiving Night – 28 November 1974
- Genre: Rock
- Length: 53:08 (LP); 139:31 (CD)
- Labels: DJM (UK); MCA (US)
- Producer: Gus Dudgeon

Elton John chronology
Rock of the Westies (1975)	Here and There (1976)	Blue Moves (1976)

Singles from Here and There
- 1. "Love Song" Released: 1976

Professional ratings
Review scores
Source	Rating
AllMusic	3.5/5 stars
Christgau's Record Guide	C

Here and There is a live album and the fourteenth official album release by British musician Elton John, released in 1976. The title refers to the two concerts represented on the album: "Here" is a concert recorded at the Royal Festival Hall in London in May 1974; "There" is a concert recorded at New York City's Madison Square Garden on 28 November 1974. The 1995 reissue of the album on CD is notable for including the final live appearance of John Lennon, who was invited to perform with John on the recent hit single "Whatever Gets You thru the Night", as well as two additional songs by the Beatles.

== Track listing ==
=== Original LP and CD ===
All tracks are written by Elton John and Bernie Taupin, except where noted.

Side one – "Here"
No.	Title	Length
1.	"Skyline Pigeon"	4:34
2.	"Border Song"	3:18
3.	"Honky Cat"	7:15
4.	"Love Song" (with Lesley Duncan) (Duncan)	5:25
5.	"Crocodile Rock"	4:15

Side two – "There"
No.	Title	Length
1.	"Funeral for a Friend/Love Lies Bleeding"	11:11
2.	"Rocket Man (I Think It's Going to Be a Long, Long Time)"	5:12
3.	"Bennie and the Jets"	6:09
4.	"Take Me to the Pilot"	5:48
Total length:		53:08

Notes

- LP sides one and two were combined as tracks 1–9 on the earliest CD releases of the album.

=== 1995 Mercury and 1996 Rocket reissue ===
Disc one – "Here"
No.	Title	Length
1.	"Skyline Pigeon"	5:41
2.	"Border Song"	3:27
3.	"Take Me to the Pilot"	4:33
4.	"Country Comfort"	6:44
5.	"Love Song" (with Lesley Duncan) (Duncan)	5:03
6.	"Bad Side of the Moon"	7:54
7.	"Burn Down the Mission"	8:25
8.	"Honky Cat"	7:04
9.	"Crocodile Rock"	4:08
10.	"Candle in the Wind"	3:57
11.	"Your Song"	3:56
12.	"Saturday Night's Alright for Fighting"	7:09
Total length:		68:01

Disc two – "There"
No.	Title	Length
1.	"Funeral for a Friend/Love Lies Bleeding"	11:53
2.	"Rocket Man (I Think It's Going to Be a Long, Long Time)"	5:03
3.	"Take Me to the Pilot"	6:00
4.	"Bennie and the Jets"	5:59
5.	"Grey Seal"	5:27
6.	"Daniel"	4:06
7.	"You're So Static"	4:32
8.	"Whatever Gets You thru the Night" (with John Lennon) (Lennon)	4:40
9.	"Lucy in the Sky with Diamonds" (with John Lennon) (Lennon, Paul McCartney)	6:15
10.	"I Saw Her Standing There" (with John Lennon) (Lennon, McCartney)	3:17
11.	"Don't Let the Sun Go Down on Me"	5:57
12.	"Your Song"	3:58
13.	"The Bitch Is Back"	4:23
Total length:		71:30

== Personnel ==
Track numbering refers to the 2-CD expanded reissues of the album.

- Elton John – Piano, Vocals
- Ray Cooper – Tambourine (CD No. 1 tracks 4, 6, 7, 8, 10, 12; CD No. 2 tracks 1, 2, 4, 7, 9–13), Congas (CD No. 1 tracks 2, 3, 5, 6, 7, 8, 12; CD No. 2 tracks 3, 5, 6, 8), Bells (CD No. 1 track 6; CD No. 2 track 9), Vibes (CD No. 1 track 7; CD No. 2 track 2), Duck Call on "Honky Cat", Organ on "Crocodile Rock"
- Lesley Duncan – Vocals ("Love Song" only)
- Davey Johnstone – Guitars (except CD No. 1 tracks 1, 2, 11), Background vocals (except : CD No. 1 tracks 1, 2, 5, 8, 9, 11; CD No. 2 tracks 5–8, 9, 12–13), Mandolin on "Honky Cat"
- John Lennon – Guitar, Vocals (CD No. 2, tracks 8–10 only)
- Dee Murray – Bass (except CD No. 1 tracks 1, 11), Background vocals (except: CD No. 1 tracks 1, 2, 5, 8, 9, 11; CD No. 2 tracks 5–8, 9, 12–13)
- Nigel Olsson – Drums (except CD No. 1 tracks 1, 11), Background vocals (except: CD No. 1 tracks 1, 2, 5, 8, 9, 11; CD No. 2 tracks 5–8, 9, 12–13)

== Production ==
- Producer: Gus Dudgeon
- Engineers: Gus Dudgeon, Phil Dunne
- Compilation: Gus Dudgeon
- Art direction: David Larkham
- Design: David Larkham
- Photography: David Nutter
- Liner notes: John Tobler

== Charts ==
=== Weekly charts ===
Chart (1976)	Peak position
Australian Albums (Kent Music Report)	11
Canada Top Albums/CDs (RPM)	13
New Zealand Albums (RMNZ)	3
Norwegian Albums (VG-lista)	19
Swedish Albums (Sverigetopplistan)	30
UK Albums (Official Charts)	6
US Billboard 200	4

=== Year-end charts ===
Chart (1976)	Position
Canada Top Albums/CDs (RPM)	87
New Zealand Albums (RMNZ)	34

== Certifications ==
Region	Certification	Certified units/sales
Australia (ARIA)	Gold	20,000^{^}
Canada (Music Canada)	Gold	50,000^{^}
United Kingdom (BPI)	Gold	100,000^{^}
United States (RIAA)	Platinum	1,000,000^{^}
^{^} Shipments figures based on certification alone.
