= Passengers (Elton John song) =

Single by Elton John

from the album Breaking Hearts
- B-side: "Lonely Boy"
- Released: 3 August 1984
- Recorded: December 1983
- Genre: Rock; folk rock; worldbeat
- Length: 3:24 (7-inch single); 5:42 (12-inch single)
- Label: Rocket (UK)
- Songwriters: Elton John; Bernie Taupin; Davey Johnstone; Phineas Mkhize
- Producer: Chris Thomas

Elton John singles chronology
"Sad Songs (Say So Much)" (1984)	"Passengers" (1984)	"Who Wears These Shoes?" (1984)

Music video
- "Passengers" on YouTube

Passengers is a 1984 song recorded by British musician Elton John from his 1984 album Breaking Hearts, released as its second single. The song reached number five on the UK singles chart and reached the top ten in Australia, but was not released as a single in the US.

The song was included on the 1986 Amnesty International compilation 'Conspiracy Of Hope' and Elton John's 1990 greatest hits compilation The Very Best of Elton John, but has not been included on any compilation since.

== Background ==
"Passengers" was composed by John, Bernie Taupin and Davey Johnstone. The music for the song was largely based on a South African folk tune called 'Isonto Lezayoni', which was recorded in 1963 by Phineas Mkhize. The whistle riff and chorus melody are borrowed from this piece, and Mkhize is given a songwriting credit for the song on this basis. It has been suggested that Taupin's lyric has an anti-apartheid message behind it.

== Live performances ==
John performed the song live during his 1985 tour of the UK, with a slightly re-arranged version of the track, making use of the brass section he used for the tour. The song has seemingly been discarded by John, having not been played live since then, as of 2019.

== Music video ==
The music video, directed by Simon Milne, was filmed in St. Tropez, France. The video featured a cameo appearance by Bernie Taupin. As was the case for many of the songs in this time period, John appears without his trademark glasses, and does not play piano.

== Personnel ==
- Elton John – vocals, synthesizers, harmonium
- Davey Johnstone – acoustic guitar, backing vocals
- Dee Murray – bass, backing vocals
- Nigel Olsson – drums, backing vocals

== Charts ==
=== Weekly charts ===
Weekly chart performance for "Passengers"
Chart (1984)	Peak position
Australia (Kent Music Report)	9
Ireland (IRMA)	9
New Zealand (Recorded Music NZ)	38
Switzerland (Swiss Hitparade)	27
UK Singles (Official Charts)	5
Zimbabwe (ZIMA)	10

=== Year-end charts ===
Year-end chart performance for "Passengers"
Chart (1984)	Position
Australia (Kent Music Report)	97
