= Too Low for Zero =

Studio album by Elton John
- Released: 31 May 1983
- Recorded: September 1982 – January 1983
- Studios: AIR, Salem, Montserrat; Sunset Sound, Hollywood, California
- Genre: Pop rock
- Length: 44:23
- Labels: Geffen (US),Rocket (UK)
- Producer: Chris Thomas

Elton John chronology
Jump Up! (1982)	Too Low for Zero (1983)	Breaking Hearts (1984)

Singles from Too Low for Zero
- 1. "I Guess That's Why They Call It the Blues" Released: April 1983; 2. "I'm Still Standing" Released: April 1983 (US); 3. "Kiss the Bride" Released: October 1983; 4. "Cold as Christmas (In the Middle of the Year)" / "Crystal" Released: November 1983 (UK)

Too Low for Zero (stylized as 2 ▼4 0) is the seventeenth studio album by British musician Elton John, released in 1983. The album marked a comeback for John, whose previous five albums had failed to yield many enduring international hit singles, and had disappointing sales compared to his string of hit records released during the first half of the 1970s.

It is his second-best-selling album of the 1980s (after Sleeping with the Past), earning Platinum certification by both the RIAA and the BPI. It produced several hit songs, each accompanied by successful MTV music videos, and it spent over a year on the Billboard album chart.

== Background ==
For the first time since Blue Moves in 1976, all lyrics were written by Bernie Taupin. John also reunited with the core of his backing band of the early 1970s: Dee Murray, Nigel Olsson and Davey Johnstone as well as Ray Cooper, Kiki Dee and Skaila Kanga (who played harp on John's self-titled album and Tumbleweed Connection).

John played synthesizers on the album in addition to piano (his first since A Single Man), as James Newton Howard left the band. John felt that synths allowed him to write better fast rock songs, having not been entirely happy with such compositions performed on piano.

The album was written and recorded in approximately two weeks, with overdubs completed in a week. It was produced by Chris Thomas and recorded at AIR Studios in Montserrat (the same studio for Jump Up!) and Sunset Sound Recorders in Hollywood.

== Releases ==
The original LP issue of the album featured a die-cut cover with a special inner sleeve. The four shapes shown on the cover were cut out, with the colours (shown as ink smears on the inner sleeve) showing through the holes. The 2010 Japanese SHM CD release of the album is the only CD version to replicate the packaging of the original LP with the die-cut design.

All B-sides released on US singles from this time originate from his 1978 album A Single Man and the 21 at 33 sessions from 1980. They were also previously released on European singles. In the US, Too Low for Zero was certified gold in January 1984 and platinum in October 1995 by the RIAA.

== Critical reception ==
Professional ratings
Review scores
Source	Rating
AllMusic	4.5/5 stars
The Encyclopedia of Popular Music	3/5 stars
Rolling Stone	3/5 stars

Reviewing the album in Rolling Stone, Don Shewey commented, "Elton John and Bernie Taupin have written some great hit singles, but since the early Elton John LP, they have never produced an album of consistently first-rate material. And although Too Low for Zero is a big step up from losers like Blue Moves and A Single Man, it doesn't hang together, either." He praised the catchy energy of "I'm Still Standing", "Kiss the Bride", "Crystal", and "Too Low for Zero", and approved of the way those four songs synthesized the styles of popular artists such as The Pointer Sisters and Joe Jackson. However, he felt the rest of the album suffered from poor lyrics, finding the morbidity of "Cold as Christmas (In the Middle of the Year)" and "One More Arrow" to be especially distasteful.

== Track listing ==
All tracks are written by Elton John and Bernie Taupin, except where noted.

Side one
No.	Title	Writer(s)	Length
1.	"Cold as Christmas (In the Middle of the Year)"		4:19
2.	"I'm Still Standing"		3:02
3.	"Too Low for Zero"		5:46
4.	"Religion"		4:05
5.	"I Guess That's Why They Call It the Blues"	John; Taupin; Davey Johnstone	4:41

Side two
No.	Title	Length
1.	"Crystal"	5:05
2.	"Kiss the Bride"	4:22
3.	"Whipping Boy"	3:43
4.	"Saint"	5:17
5.	"One More Arrow"	3:34
Total length:		44:23

Bonus tracks (1998 Mercury reissue)
No.	Title	Writer(s)	Length
11.	"Earn While You Learn"	Lord Choc Ice (pseudonym for Elton John)	6:46
12.	"Dreamboat"	John; Gary Osborne; Tim Renwick	7:34
13.	"The Retreat"		4:46
Total length:			63:31

- Sides one and two were combined as tracks 1–10 on CD reissues.

== Personnel ==
Track numbering refers to CD and digital releases of the album.

=== Musicians ===
- Elton John – lead vocals, backing vocals, acoustic piano (tracks 1–5, 7, 8, 10), Fender Rhodes (track 1), synthesizers (tracks 1–7, 9), clavinet (track 9)
- Davey Johnstone – acoustic guitar (tracks 1, 4–6, 9), electric guitar (tracks 2–10), backing vocals
- Dee Murray – bass guitar, backing vocals
- Nigel Olsson – drums, tambourine on "Whipping Boy", backing vocals
- Ray Cooper – percussion on "Cold as Christmas (In the Middle of the Year)"
- Skaila Kanga – harp on "Cold as Christmas (In the Middle of the Year)"
- Kiki Dee – backing vocals on "Cold as Christmas (In the Middle of the Year)"
- Stevie Wonder – harmonica on "I Guess That's Why They Call It the Blues"
- James Newton Howard – string arrangements on "One More Arrow"

=== On bonus tracks ===
- Elton John – acoustic piano on "Earn While You Learn" and "The Retreat", organ on "Earn While You Learn" and "Dreamboat", Fender Rhodes on "Dreamboat", Mellotron on "Earn While You Learn", vocals on "Dreamboat and "The Retreat"
- David Paich – Hammond organ on "The Retreat"
- James Newton-Howard – synthesizers on "The Retreat"
- Tim Renwick – guitar on "Earn While You Learn" and "Dreamboat"
- Steve Lukather – guitar on "The Retreat"
- Clive Franks – bass guitar on "Earn While You Learn" and "Dreamboat"
- Reggie McBride – bass guitar on "The Retreat"
- Steve Holley – drums on "Earn While You Learn" and "Dreamboat"
- Alvin Taylor – drums on "The Retreat"
- Ray Cooper – tambourine on "Earn While You Learn" and "Dreamboat", triangle on "Earn While You Learn"
- Paul Buckmaster – orchestra arrangements on "Dreamboat"

=== Production ===
- Chris Thomas – producer, original mastering
- Bill Price – recording
- AIR Studios (London, UK) – mixing location
- Rod Dyer – art direction
- Clive Piercy – design
- John Reid – management

=== 1998 reissue ===
- Elton John – producer (bonus tracks)
- Clive Franks – producer (bonus tracks)
- Mike Gill – supervising producer
- Gus Dudgeon – remastering
- Peter Mew – digital remastering
- Abbey Road Studios (London, UK) – remastering location
- Mike Storey – remastered graphics
- John Tobler – liner notes

=== Dolby Atmos Mix release ===
- Felix Penny – mixing
- Greg Penny – mixing

== Charts ==
=== Weekly charts ===
Weekly chart performance for Too Low for Zero
Chart (1983–1984)	Peak position
Australian Albums (Kent Music Report)	2
Canada Top Albums/CDs (RPM)	17
Dutch Albums (Album Top 100)	28
German Albums (Offizielle Top 100)	5
Japanese Albums (Oricon)	71
New Zealand Albums (RMNZ)	2
Norwegian Albums (VG-lista)	6
Spanish Albums (AFYVE)	7
Swedish Albums (Sverigetopplistan)	30
UK Albums (Official Charts)	7
US Billboard 200	25

=== Year-end charts ===
1983 year-end chart performance for Too Low for Zero
Chart (1983)	Position
Australian Albums (Kent Music Report)	3
Canada Top Albums/CDs (RPM)	79
German Albums (Offizielle Top 100)	35
New Zealand Albums (RMNZ)	11
UK Albums (OCC	16

1984 year-end chart performance for Too Low for Zero
Chart (1984)	Position
Australian Albums (Kent Music Report)	8
New Zealand Albums (RMNZ)	19
UK Albums (OCC	74

=== Decade-end charts ===
Decade-end chart performance for Too Low for Zero
Chart (1980–1989)	Position
Australian Albums (Kent Music Report)	7

== Certifications and sales ==
Certifications and sales for Too Low for Zero
Region	Certification	Certified units/sales
Australia (ARIA)	5× Platinum	350,000^{^}
Canada (Music Canada)	Platinum	100,000^{^}
France (SNEP)	Gold	100,000^{*}
Germany (BVMI)	Gold	250,000^{^}
Italy (FIMI)	Gold	50,000^{*}
New Zealand (RMNZ)	2× Platinum	30,000^{^}
Spain	—	49,000
Switzerland (IFPI Switzerland)	Gold	25,000^{^}
United Kingdom (BPI)	Platinum	300,000^{^}
United States (RIAA)	Platinum	1,000,000^{^}
^{*} Sales figures based on certification alone.^{^} Shipments figures based on certification alone.
