= Who Wears These Shoes? =

Single by Elton John

from the album Breaking Hearts
- B-side: "Tortured" (worldwide) "Lonely Boy" (US)
- Released: October 1984 (UK)
- Studio: AIR (Salem, Montserrat)
- Length: 4:02; 3:38 (single)
- Label: Rocket; Geffen
- Composer(s): Elton John
- Lyricist(s): Bernie Taupin
- Producer(s): Chris Thomas

Elton John singles chronology
"Passengers" (1984)	"Who Wears These Shoes?" (1984)	"In Neon" (1984)

"Who Wears These Shoes?" is a song by British musician Elton John and lyricist Bernie Taupin, performed by John. It was released as the third single from his eighteenth studio album Breaking Hearts (1984) in the UK in October 1984, while it was the album's second single in the US.

In the US, the song reached number 16, becoming the album's second top 20 hit. The song peaked at number 50 in the UK. It was later included on the 1992 compilation album Greatest Hits 1976–1986.
