= Honky Cat =

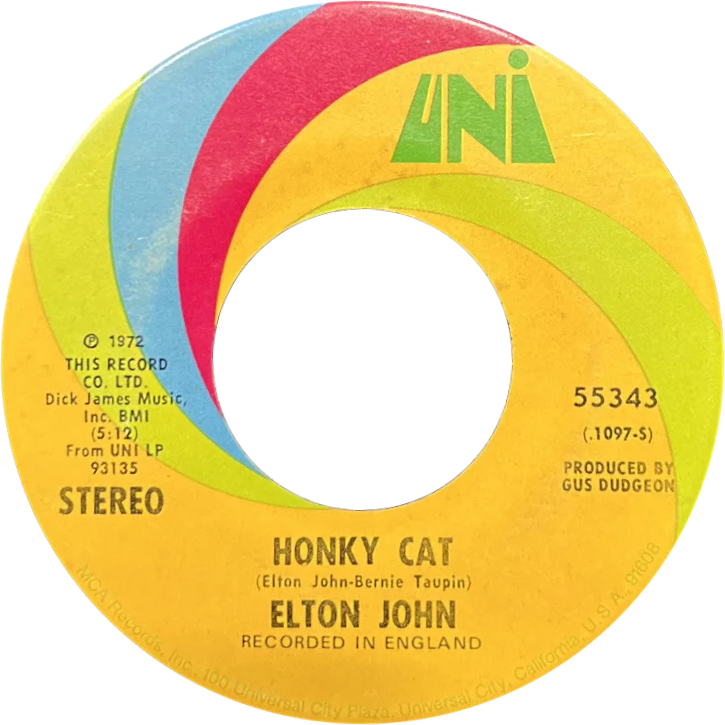
- One of side-A labels of the US single

Single by Elton John

from the album Honky Château
- B-side: "Slave"
- Released: 31 July 1972
- Recorded: 17 January 1972
- Genre: Pop; rock; boogie-woogie
- Length: 5:12
- Label: Uni (USA), DJM (UK)
- Songwriters: Elton John; Bernie Taupin
- Producer: Gus Dudgeon

Elton John singles chronology
"Rocket Man" (1972)	"Honky Cat" (1972)	"Crocodile Rock" (1972)

Audio
- "Honky Cat" on YouTube

"Honky Cat" is a song written by British musician Elton John and lyricist Bernie Taupin, and performed by John. It was used as the opening track for John's fifth studio album, Honky Château, released in 1972.

"Honky Cat" was also released as the A-side of John's thirteenth single. The single reached No. 31 in the United Kingdom, and fared better in the United States, peaking at No. 8 on the Billboard Hot 100 just as John launched an American tour in September 1972.

John has performed this song numerous times in the 50+ years since its release. A live version of the song was released on the Here side of the Here and There live set in 1976 (and its expanded CD version in 1995), and a solo piano version appeared on the EltonJohn.com Live in Madison Square Garden Vol. 1 limited edition CD, recorded in October 1999 during his 1999 solo tour.

== Reception ==
Record World said that the "sparkling mix and funky backbeat suit Elton's slidy vocal down to the ground." Cash Box said "Faster than a speeding 'Rocket Man,' and more powerful for the rinky-tink fun of it all, this track from [John's] #1 LP should be his biggest ever." Winston Cook-Wilson of Spin called it John's "most underrated" single.

In 2018, Dave Simpson of The Guardian ranked the song No. 48 on his list of the 50 greatest Elton John songs. The following year, Justin Kirkland of Esquire ranked the song No. 27 on his list of the 30 best Elton John songs, calling it a "funky, horn-laden hit" and writing that "it's hard to compare the odd mix of electric piano and wheezing saxophone to any other single in Elton's songbook."

The song was also featured on the soundtrack to the 1998 movie Sliding Doors.

== Covers ==
Lee Ann Womack covered the song on the 2018 tribute album Restoration: Reimagining the Songs of Elton John and Bernie Taupin.

== Chart performance ==
=== Weekly charts ===
Chart (1972–73)	Peak position
Australia (Kent Music Report)	78
Canada Top Singles (RPM)	10
Germany Singles Chart	41
New Zealand (Listener)	4
UK Singles Chart	31
U.S. Billboard Hot 100	8
US Adult Contemporary (Billboard)	6
U.S. Cash Box Top 100	18

=== Year-end charts ===
Chart (1972)	Rank
Canada	87
U.S. (Joel Whitburn's Pop Annual)	84

== Personnel ==
- Elton John – Fender Rhodes electric piano, acoustic piano, vocals
- Davey Johnstone – banjo
- Dee Murray – bass
- Nigel Olsson – drums
- Ivan Jullien – trumpet
- Jacques Bolognesi – trombone
- Jean-Louis Chautemps – saxophone
- Alain Hatot – saxophone

=== Production ===
- Gus Dudgeon – horn arranger, producer
- Ken Scott – engineer
