= Cold as Christmas (In the Middle of the Year) =

Single by Elton John

from the album Too Low for Zero
- A-side: "Crystal"
- Released: November 1983
- Length: 4:18
- Label: Rocket
- Songwriters: Elton John; Bernie Taupin
- Producer: Chris Thomas

Elton John singles chronology
"Too Low for Zero" (1983)	"Cold as Christmas (In the Middle of the Year)" / "Crystal" (1983)	"Sad Songs (Say So Much)" (1984)

"Cold as Christmas (In the Middle of the Year)" is a song by the British singer-songwriter Elton John. It was written by John and Bernie Taupin and released as the opening track on John's seventeenth studio album Too Low for Zero (1983). It was also released as a single in the UK in November 1983, as a double A-side with "Crystal". The lyrics depict a faltering marriage between an older couple.

Upon its release as a single, "Cold as Christmas" became a top 40 hit in the UK. It received positive reviews from critics, being considered one of the stronger tracks on its parent album.

== Overview ==
According to biographer Elizabeth Rosenthal, the inspiration for "Cold as Christmas" came from the "paradisaic surroundings" of Montserrat, where Too Low for Zero was recorded. Its lyrics depict a failing marriage, narrated by the husband who has unsuccessfully attempted to resurrect the relationship by traveling to a tropical location. Both Rosenthal and writer David Buckley cite this song as evidence of Taupin's shift from more fantastical themes to more "adult" themes including depression, love, and relationships. Critic Martin Townsend describes the track as an "everyday story of a marriage break-up in the Tropics", while Daniel Ross of the BBC calls it a "terribly sad portrait of marital decay". Musically, Buckley considers it to be the record's "simplest" song, while Stephen Thomas Erlewine compares it to John's earlier work on Goodbye Yellow Brick Road (1973). In addition to the Elton John Band, musicians appearing on the song include harpist Skaila Kanga and Kiki Dee on backing vocals. John would perform this song a couple of times on the orchestral part of his Tour de Force concerts with the Melbourne Symphony Orchestra in 1986.

== Reception ==
Reviewing the single for Number One, Townsend considered it to be the stronger of the two songs, praising its "beautiful piano arrangement" and deeming it John's best single since "Blue Eyes" (1982). Buckley considers it to be the strongest song on Too Low for Zero, while Rosenthal places it among the "cottony, synthesizer-fringed ballad[s] of the type he was, and still is, so good at composing." Shana Naomi Krochmal of Vulture listed it at number 190 (out of 388) in a ranking of every Elton John song, calling it "divorced-dad blues", yet "beautifully written and produced". Conversely, Don Shewey of Rolling Stone criticized it as one of the album's "sentimental story songs" which he found among the weakest on the record.

The single was a top 40 hit in the UK, where it peaked at number 33 with a chart stay of six weeks. It was more successful in Australia, where it peaked at number 12.

== Charts ==
Chart (1983)	Peak position
Australia (Kent Music Report)	12
UK Singles Chart (OCC)	33
