= Honky Château =

Studio album by Elton John
- Released: 19 May 1972
- Recorded: 15–23 January 1972
- Studios: Château d'Hérouville, Hérouville, France; Trident, London, UK (mixing)
- Genres: Rock; pop
- Length: 45:12
- Labels: Uni (US); DJM (UK)
- Producer: Gus Dudgeon

Elton John chronology
Madman Across the Water (1971)	Honky Château (1972)	Don't Shoot Me I'm Only the Piano Player (1973)

Singles from Honky Château
- 1. "Rocket Man" Released: 31 March 1972; 2. "Honky Cat" Released: 31 July 1972

Honky Château is the fifth studio album by British musician Elton John. It was released on 19 May 1972, and was titled after the 18th century French chateau where it was recorded, Château d'Hérouville. The album reached number one on the US Billboard 200, the first of John's seven consecutive US number one albums.

Two singles were released worldwide from Honky Château, "Rocket Man" and "Honky Cat". A third single, "Hercules", was prepared for release, but this never materialised. This was the final Elton John album on the Uni label in the US and Canada before MCA consolidated all of its various labels under the MCA brand. This and John's earlier Uni albums were later reissued on MCA Records.

In 2003, the album was ranked number 357 on Rolling Stone magazine's list of the "500 Greatest Albums of All Time". It was revised to number 359 in 2012, and raised to number 251 in a 2020 list. It was certified gold in July 1972 and platinum in October 1995 by the Recording Industry Association of America (RIAA).

== Music ==
Honky Château was the first in Elton John's streak of chart-topping albums in the US, which culminated with 1975's Rock of the Westies. It was also the first studio album to feature John's road band of Dee Murray on bass and Nigel Olsson on drums, along with new member Davey Johnstone on electric and acoustic guitars and other fretted instruments, as the core group of musicians. Previously, the record label insisted that John use them for only one track each on Tumbleweed Connection and Madman Across the Water; the rest of the songs on those two albums were performed by session players. Johnstone had played acoustic guitar, mandolin and sitar on Madman Across the Water, but on Honky Château, he would be invited to join permanently as a full-band member and he extended his contributions to electric guitar, banjo, slide guitar and backing vocals.

The opening track, "Honky Cat", is a New Orleans funk track reminiscent of Dr. John and Allen Toussaint, and features a four-piece horn section arranged by producer Gus Dudgeon. Also of note is the on-record debut of the backing vocal combination of Johnstone, Murray and Olsson, who first added what would soon become their "trademark" sound to "Rocket Man". The trio's unique approach to arranging their backing vocal tracks would be a fixture on John's singles and albums for the next several years.

In 1995, Dudgeon remastered the album, adding only an uptempo, piano-based, rock and roll version of "Slave", that was originally sidelined in favour of the slower, guitar-based version on the original LP. This alternate version was originally due to be released as the B-side to the ultimately unreleased "Hercules" single. It did not get an official release until it appeared on the compilation Rare Masters in 1992.

In February 2023, John announced the album would be reissued in a 50th-anniversary edition on LP (two versions: double-LP set and single LP on gold vinyl) and 2 CDs. The double LP and 2-CD configurations include outtakes from the original session tapes. The 2-CD format additionally contains eight live recordings from the Royal Festival Hall show in 1972. It was released on 24 March 2023.

== Reception ==
Professional ratings
Aggregate scores
Source	Rating
Metacritic	87/100 (50th Anniversary)
Review scores
Source	Rating
AllMusic	5/5 stars
Christgau's Record Guide	A−
The Encyclopedia of Popular Music	4/5 stars
Pitchfork	8.4/10
The Rolling Stone Album Guide	5/5 stars

=== Critical appraisal ===
Critically, Honky Château is regarded as one of John's finest records. Jon Landau of Rolling Stone approved the original LP as "a rich, warm, satisfying album that stands head and shoulders above the morass of current releases". In the Los Angeles Times, Robert Hilburn hailed the music as innovative and Bernie Taupin's lyrics as humorous, ironic and satirical.

Retrospective reviews of Honky Château have also been mostly positive. Stephen Thomas Erlewine of AllMusic wrote of the album that it "plays as the most focused and accomplished set of songs Elton John and Bernie Taupin ever wrote," and characterized it as being an eclectic collection of "ballads, rockers, blues, country-rock, and soul songs.". Chris Roberts also praised the album in a review for BBC, saying that the album "stands up as one of [John's] most eclectic, durable collections".

=== Chart success ===
Honky Château became the first of a string of albums by Elton John to hit No. 1 on the Billboard 200 album chart in the US. In Canada, the album peaked at No. 3 on the RPM 100 Top Albums Chart, reaching this position on 29 July 1972, dropping two places to No. 5, then returning to No. 3 for a further twelve consecutive weeks before falling to No. 9 on 4 November of the same year.

== Track listing ==
All tracks are written by Elton John and Bernie Taupin.

Side one
No.	Title	Length
1.	"Honky Cat"	5:12
2.	"Mellow"	5:33
3.	"I Think I'm Going to Kill Myself"	3:35
4.	"Susie (Dramas)"	3:25
5.	"Rocket Man (I Think It’s Going to Be a Long, Long Time)"	4:40

Side two
No.	Title	Length
6.	"Salvation"	3:59
7.	"Slave"	4:22
8.	"Amy"	4:03
9.	"Mona Lisas and Mad Hatters"	5:01
10.	"Hercules"	5:21
Total length:		45:15

Bonus tracks (1995 Mercury and 1996 Rocket reissue)
No.	Title	Length
11.	"Slave" (Alternative version)	2:53
Total length:		48:08

- The album, including the bonus track, was also released in 2004 as a "Hybrid SACD" remixed in 5.1.

== Personnel ==
Track numbers refer to CD and digital releases of the album.

=== Musicians ===
- Elton John – vocals, acoustic piano (1–6, 8–10), Fender Rhodes (1), Hammond organ (2, 4), harmonium (6)
- David Hentschel – ARP synthesizer (5, 10) (erroneously credited as "David Henschel" on sleeve)
- Davey Johnstone – banjo (1, 7); electric, acoustic and slide guitars (2–10); backing vocals (3, 5, 6, 8, 10), steel guitar (7), mandolin (9)
- Dee Murray – bass guitar, backing vocals (3, 5, 6, 8, 10)
- Nigel Olsson – drums (1–8, 10), tambourine (2, 4), backing vocals (3, 5, 6, 8, 10), congas (7)
- Ray Cooper – congas (8)
- Jean-Louis Chautemps – saxophone (1)
- Alain Hatot – saxophone (1)
- Jacques Bolognesi – trombone (1)
- Ivan Jullien – trumpet (1)
- Jean-Luc Ponty – electric violin (2, 8)
- "Legs" Larry Smith – tap dance (3)
- Gus Dudgeon – brass arrangements (1), additional backing vocals (10), whistle (10)
- Madeline Bell – backing vocals (6)
- Tony Hazzard – backing vocals (6), additional backing vocals (10)
- Liza Strike – backing vocals (6)
- Larry Steel – backing vocals (6)

=== Production ===
- Producer – Gus Dudgeon
- Engineer – Ken Scott
- Remastering – Tony Cousins
- Cover photo – Ed Caraeff
- Liner notes – John Tobler
- SACD authoring – Gus Skinas
- Digital transfers – Ricky Graham
- surround mix 5.1 & Dolby Atmos Mix - Greg Penny Grammy Nomination Best Surround Album

== Charts ==
=== Weekly charts ===
Chart (1972–1973)	Peak position
Australian Albums (Kent Music Report)	4
Canada Top Albums/CDs (RPM)	3
Dutch Albums (Album Top 100)	9
German Albums (Offizielle Top 100)	43
Italian Albums (Musica e Dischi)	5
Japanese Albums (Oricon)	21
Norwegian Albums (VG-lista)	8
Spanish Albums (Spanish Albums Chart)	1
UK Albums (Official Charts)	2
US Billboard 200	1

Chart (2023)	Peak position
Belgian Albums (Ultratop Flanders)	174
Scottish Albums (Official Charts)	11
Swiss Albums (Schweizer Hitparade)	99
UK Albums (Official Charts)	33

=== Year-end charts ===
Chart (1972)	Position
Australian Albums (Kent Music Report)	15
US Billboard Year-End	24

Chart (1973)	Position
US Billboard Year-End	80

== Certifications ==
Region	Certification	Certified units/sales
Australia (ARIA)	Platinum	50,000^{^}
Canada (Music Canada)	Platinum	100,000^{^}
New Zealand (RMNZ)	Platinum	15,000^{‡}
United Kingdom (BPI)	Gold	100,000^{^}
United States (RIAA)	Platinum	1,000,000^{^}
^{^} Shipments figures based on certification alone.^{‡} Sales+streaming figures based on certification alone.
