= Kiss the Bride (song) =

1983 song by Elton John

Single by Elton John

from the album Too Low for Zero
- B-side: "Dreamboat" (written by John/Tim Renwick/Gary Osborne; UK) "Choc Ice Goes Mental" (credited to Lord Choc Ice (John); US)
- Released: 7 October 1983
- Recorded: September 1982 – January 1983
- Studio: AIR (Montserrat) and Sunset Sound Recorders (Hollywood)
- Genre: Pop rock; new wave
- Length: 3:55 (single version); 4:24 (album version)
- Label: Rocket (UK); Geffen (US)
- Songwriters: Elton John, Bernie Taupin
- Producer: Chris Thomas

Elton John singles chronology
"I'm Still Standing" (1983)	"Kiss the Bride" (1983)	"Cold as Christmas (In the Middle of the Year)"/"Crystal" (1983)

Music video
- "Kiss The Bride" on YouTube

"Kiss the Bride" is a song by British musician Elton John and lyricist Bernie Taupin, from John's 17th studio album Too Low for Zero. Released as the album's third single, the upbeat song was a top 40 hit in many countries. It reached No. 20 on the UK singles chart, No. 25 on the US Billboard Hot 100 chart, No. 25 in Australia, No. 37 in Canada, No. 17 in Ireland, and No. 32 in New Zealand. In Germany, the song peaked at No. 58.

John played this song on setlists from 1984 until the 1989 leg of his Sleeping with the Past Tour. The music video of the song was directed by the rock duo Godley & Creme, formerly of the art rock group 10cc.

== Song meaning ==
The song depicts a man being in love with a woman who is now about to marry someone else. They had a relationship before and they have parted, leaving on good enough terms for the narrator to attend her wedding to her new sweetheart.

He is still in love with her and wishes he could be getting back with her, but he accepts that she does not love him anymore as a romantic partner, but loved as a friend and she is happy with her husband-to-be. On the one hand, he is happy to see her happy, but secretly longs for her. He really wants to stop the ceremony, but he does not know if it will work to make her love him again for the second time.

== Charts ==
Chart (1983–1984)	Peak position
Australia (Kent Music Report)	25
Canada Top Singles (RPM)	37
Germany (GfK)	58
Ireland (IRMA)	17
Luxembourg (Radio Luxembourg)	15
New Zealand (Recorded Music NZ)	32
UK Singles (Official Charts)	20
US Billboard Hot 100	25

== Personnel ==
- Elton John – vocals, piano, synthesizers
- Davey Johnstone – electric guitar, backing vocals
- Dee Murray – bass guitar, backing vocals
- Nigel Olsson – drums, backing vocals

== Sampling ==
- This song, along with other Elton John songs, "Rocket Man", "Sacrifice" and "Where's the Shoorah?", was sampled in the 2021 collaboration between John and Dua Lipa titled "Cold Heart (Pnau remix)". The mashup song was made by the Australian dance trio Pnau and became an instant hit worldwide, creating a revival in interest in John's music.
