= Jean-Louis Chautemps =

French jazz saxophonist (1931–2022)

- Born: 6 August 1931; Paris, France
- Died: 25 May 2022 (aged 90)
- Genres: Jazz
- Instrument: Saxophone

Jean-Louis Chautemps (6 August 1931 – 25 May 2022) was a French jazz saxophonist.

== Career ==
Born in Paris, Chautemps initially studied medicine and law, and began playing saxophone at age 16. His first major gig was with Jef Gilson in 1950. In 1952 he began playing with Claude Bolling's orchestra, and around the same time worked with Henri Renaud and Albert Nicholas. During these associations he played with Sidney Bechet, Django Reinhardt, Zoot Sims, Lester Young, Bobby Jaspar, Albert Ayler, and Roy Eldridge. He toured Europe as a sideman for Chet Baker in 1956, played with Jacques Hélian and Kurt Edelhagen near the end of the decade, and played often in Parisian clubs in the 1960s. Later associations included work with Nathan Davis, Philly Joe Jones, André Hodeir, Lester Bowie, Bernard Lubat, Martial Solal, Lee Konitz, and Michel Portal.

Chautemps played on Elton John's 1972 hit single "Honky Cat", from the album Honky Château.

He appears as an interviewee in the 2010 documentary film by Christian Gascio Django Reinhardt - Three-Fingered Lightning.
