= Restless (Elton John song) =

Song by Elton John

from the album Breaking Hearts
- Released: June 1984
- Recorded: December 1983 – January 1984
- Genre: Blues rock
- Length: 5:17
- Label: Geffen Records (US and Canada); The Rocket Record Company (rest of the world)
- Songwriters: Elton John, Bernie Taupin
- Producer: Chris Thomas

"Restless" is a song by Elton John with lyrics by Bernie Taupin. It was the opening track off his 1984 album, Breaking Hearts.

In 1985, the song was nominated in Grammy Awards for Best Male Rock Vocal Performance. It lost to Bruce Springsteen's “Dancing in the Dark”.

== Musical structure ==
A steady 4/4 beat drives the song, accompanied by guitar solo and bass that follows the piano pattern. The studio version features a heavy load of synthesizers, giving the song a more 'updated' feel than the original demo, which was more piano-driven. The song is more than five minutes long.

== Lyrical meaning ==
The song is almost political. At the time of its release, it was the height of the Cold War, and the lyrics describe that the people are "Searching for something that just ain't there". There are also mentions of that the "Walls have ears" and "Big Brother's watching". This links to the novel, Nineteen Eighty-Four, in which both lines actually exist, curiously in the same year as the song was released. It could also be a pun on the German Democratic Republic, which at the time had surveillance similar to that of the novel. Taupin also writes that they're "Breaking down doors in foreign countries", which was the fall of communism. It had begun to take place shortly after the song's release.

== Performances ==
The song was performed for the first time in the spring of 1984. It was a live staple up and until 1986. On stage, John would often introduce the song as a "rock and roll number", and the live versions are much faster and piano-based than the studio version. One of the live versions (recorded at Wembley Arena in 30 June 1984) were eventually released as the B-side to "Wrap Her Up", and now appears as one of the bonus tracks on his next album, 1985's Ice on Fire.

The song appeared in the episode "To Hull and Back" of Only Fools and Horses.

== Charts ==
Chart (1984)	Peak position
US Mainstream Rock (Billboard)	16

== Personnel ==
- Elton John – vocals, acoustic piano, synthesizers
- Davey Johnstone – guitars, backing vocals
- Dee Murray – bass, backing vocals
- Nigel Olsson – drums, backing vocals
