= Ivan Jullien =

French jazz trumpeter (1934–2015)

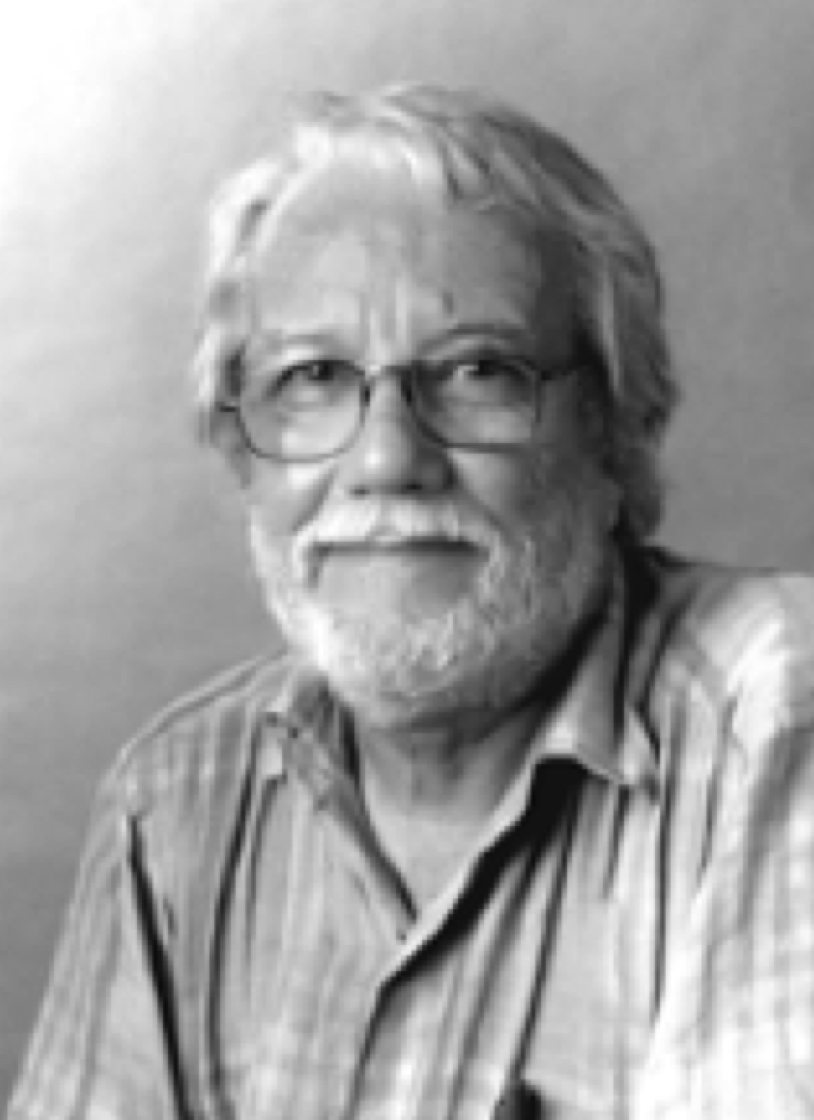
- Ivan Jullien

Background information
- Born: October 27, 1934; France
- Died: January 3, 2015 (aged 80)
- Genres: jazz
- Occupations: Trumpeter, arranger, bandleader
- Instrument: Trumpet
- Years active: 1950s–1980s

Ivan Jullien (October 27, 1934 – January 3, 2015) was a French jazz trumpeter.

Jullien played with Claude Bolling and Jacques Denjean early in his career, and was the bandleader for the Paris Jazz All Stars in 1966–1967. He recorded as a leader and also worked as a sideman for Lester Bowie, Elton John, Maynard Ferguson, and Ben Webster. In the 1980s, he became an arranger for Studio Brussels' CIM Big Band.
