= Crocodile Rock =

1972 single by Elton John

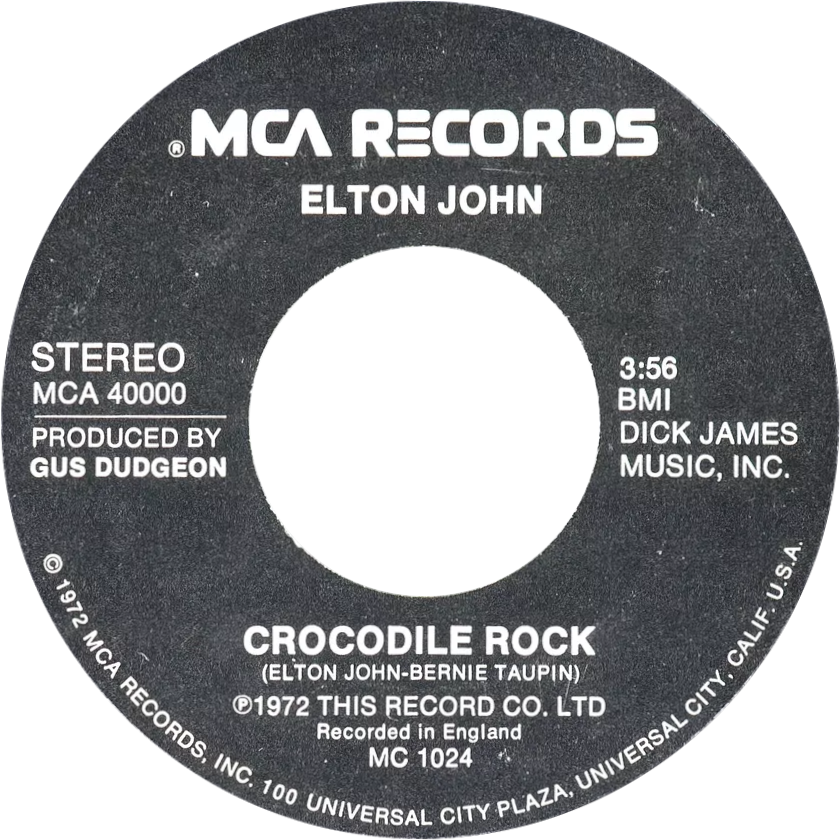
- Side A of the original US single

Single by Elton John

from the album Don't Shoot Me I'm Only the Piano Player
- B-side: "Elderberry Wine"
- Released: 27 October 1972 (UK); 20 November 1972 (US)
- Recorded: June–July 1972
- Studio: Château d'Hérouville (France)
- Genre: Rock and roll; glam rock; pop rock
- Length: 3:56 (album version, US 45 version); 3:23 (single version)
- Label: DJM (UK); MCA (US)
- Songwriters: Elton John; Bernie Taupin
- Producer: Gus Dudgeon

Elton John singles chronology
"Honky Cat" (1972)	"Crocodile Rock" (1972)	"Daniel" (1973)

"Crocodile Rock" is a song written by Elton John and Bernie Taupin, and recorded in summer 1972 at the Château d'Hérouville studio in France (it was listed as "Strawberry Studios" in the album's credits), where John and his team had previously recorded the Honky Château album. It was released on 27 October 1972 in the UK and 20 November 1972 in the U.S., as a pre-release single from his forthcoming 1973 album Don't Shoot Me I'm Only the Piano Player, and became his first U.S. number-one single, reaching the top spot on 3 February 1973, and staying there for three consecutive weeks. In the U.S., it was certified Gold on 5 February 1973 and Platinum on 13 September 1995 by the Recording Industry Association of America (RIAA). In Canada, it topped the chart as well, remaining at number one on the RPM 100 national singles chart for four weeks from 17 February through 10 March. It was the first song released as a single on the MCA label (catalogue #40000) after MCA was created (John had previously been with the Uni label.)

"Crocodile Rock" is dominated by a Farfisa organ riff, played by John. The lyrics take a nostalgic look at early rock 'n' roll, pop culture, dating and youthful independence of that era. John's band members, include Davey Johnstone on guitars, Dee Murray on bass and Nigel Olsson on drums, were also performers on the song. John performed all the vocals, including the falsetto backing vocals.

== Inspiration ==
The song was inspired by John's discovery of leading Australian band Daddy Cool and their hit single "Eagle Rock", which was the most successful Australian single of the early 1970s (with 1,000,000 sold), remaining at No.1 for a record of 10 weeks. John heard the song and the group on his 1972 Australian tour and was greatly impressed by it. A photo included in the album packaging features John's lyricist, Bernie Taupin, wearing a "Daddy Who?" promotional badge. The song also includes a lyrical reference to the 1950s hit record "Rock Around the Clock" by Bill Haley and his Comets ("While the other kids were rocking around the clock...").

In a 1974 lawsuit filed in the US District Court of Los Angeles by attorney Donald Barnett on behalf of "Speedy Gonzales"' composer Buddy Kaye, it was alleged that defendants John and Taupin illegally incorporated chords from "Speedy Gonzales" which produced a falsetto tone into the "Crocodile" song co-written by defendants. The parties reached a settlement between them and the case was then dismissed.

Taupin also stated in an Esquire magazine interview that "Crocodile Rock" was a funny song in that he did not mind creating it, but it would not be something he would listen to; it was simply something fun at the time. John has dismissed criticism of the song that it was "derivative", quoted in the booklet for the 1995 reissue of Don't Shoot Me ... as saying, "I wanted it to be a record about all the things I grew up with. Of course it's a rip-off, it's derivative in every sense of the word."

Billboard reviewed the single, stating that it "is a clever easy beat rocker with a sound and flavor of the 50's hits." Record World called it a "loving homage to revival rock and roll" with "a solid, infectious beat, funny and clever Taupin lyrics, and brilliant Gus Dudgeon production."

== Live performances ==
John has played the song numerous times live in concert from 1972 to 1984, and then again from 1998 to present (excluding the ballad version performed from 1993 to 1994, that he performed at the Greek Theater with Ray Cooper in September 1994). Live versions released include an audio version from 1974 on the Here and There original LP and 1995 CD reissue, and a video concert version on the Elton 60 – Live at Madison Square Garden DVD release. When John presented The Muppet Show in 1978, he performed the song alongside crocodile puppets singing the backing vocals.

In 2021, John revealed that "Crocodile Rock" was "written as a kind of joke" and that he does not enjoy playing the song any more. He has continued singing it in concert because fans enjoy it, but vowed never to play it again once his Farewell Yellow Brick Road tour ended.

== Personnel ==
- Elton John – vocals, piano, Farfisa organ
- Davey Johnstone – electric guitar
- Dee Murray – bass
- Nigel Olsson – drums

== Charts ==
=== Weekly charts ===
Chart (1972–1973)	Peak position
Belgium	3
Canada Top Singles (RPM)	1
Germany	3
Ireland	10
Italy	1
Netherlands Dutch Top 40	11
Norway	3
New Zealand (Listener)	1
South Africa (Springbok)	6
Switzerland	1
UK Singles Chart	5
US Billboard Hot 100	1
US Adult Contemporary (Billboard)	11
US Cash Box Top 100	1
Zimbabwe (ZIMA)	2

=== Year-end charts ===
Chart (1973)	Rank
Australia	5
Brazil (Crowley)	16
Canada Top Singles (RPM)	5
Switzerland	7
UK	49
US Billboard Hot 100	7
US Cash Box Top 100	4

== Certifications ==
Region	Certification	Certified units/sales
New Zealand (RMNZ)	2× Platinum	60,000^{‡}
United Kingdom (BPI)	Platinum	600,000^{‡}
United States (RIAA)	Platinum	1,000,000^{^}
^{^} Shipments figures based on certification alone.^{‡} Sales+streaming figures based on certification alone.

== See also ==
- List of Billboard Hot 100 number-one singles of 1973
- "American Pie", another song with a nostalgic view of early rock 'n roll culture
