= Sad Songs (Say So Much) =

Single by Elton John

from the album Breaking Hearts
- B-side: "A Simple Man"
- Released: 18 May 1984
- Recorded: December 1983
- Genre: Soft rock
- Length: 4:07 (7"); 4:55 (album version)
- Label: Geffen (U.S.); Rocket (UK)
- Songwriters: Elton John, Bernie Taupin
- Producer: Chris Thomas

Elton John singles chronology
"Cold as Christmas (In the Middle of the Year)" / "Crystal" (1984)	"Sad Songs (Say So Much)" (1984)	"Passengers" (1984)

Music video
- "Sad Songs (Say So Much)" on YouTube

"Sad Songs (Say So Much)" is a song by British musician Elton John and lyricist Bernie Taupin. It is the closing track on his eighteenth studio album Breaking Hearts, and was released in 1984 as the lead single. It reached No. 7 on the UK chart and No. 5 on the US Billboard Hot 100 chart. The song reached the Top 10 of many countries except in Germany and Italy where it reached the Top 20. The single version of this song appeared on the 1990 box set To Be Continued... and various versions of the 2007 compilation Rocket Man: The Definitive Hits.

The lyrics describe how listening to old blues songs on the radio can help someone who is hurting to feel better. "When all hope is gone, sad songs say so much."

== Music video ==
The music video, directed by Russell Mulcahy and shot on a street in Rushcutters Bay, Sydney, featured John without his familiar trademark glasses in some scenes. The single sleeve likewise featured John with no glasses. The song and the music video were both used in an early 1980s US TV advertisement for Sasson Jeans, altering the lyrics to "Sasson says so much."

== Performances ==
John played this song on his concerts from 1984 to 1993 and then again in 2000 to present on rotation after he performed the song on One Night Only: The Greatest Hits Live at Madison Square Garden in October 2000 with Canadian rock star Bryan Adams. In 2013, John was joined by Rod Stewart in a special performance of the song at the London Palladium after being presented with the first Brits Icon award in recognition of his "lasting impact" on UK culture.

== Personnel ==
- Elton John – vocals, piano, synthesizer, clavinet
- Davey Johnstone – acoustic guitar, backing vocals
- Dee Murray – bass, backing vocals
- Nigel Olsson – drums, backing vocals

== Chart performance ==
=== Weekly charts ===
Chart (1984)	Peak position
Australia (Kent Music Report)	4
Austria (Ö3 Austria Top 40)	4
Canadian Top Singles	4
Canadian Adult Contemporary	1
Germany (Media Control AG)	18
Ireland (IRMA)	2
Italy (Musica e Dischi)	22
Luxembourg (Radio Luxembourg)	6
New Zealand (Recorded Music NZ)	8
South Africa (RISA)	5
Switzerland (Schweizer Hitparade)	3
UK Singles (Official Charts)	7
US Billboard Hot 100	5
US Billboard Adult Contemporary	2
US Cash Box Top 100	10
US Mainstream Rock (Billboard)	24
Zimbabwe Singles (ZIMA)	6

=== Year-end charts ===
Chart (1984)	Rank
Australia (Kent Music Report)	30
Canada	36
UK	78
U.S. Billboard Hot 100	54
U.S. Cash Box	69

== Certifications ==
Certifications for "Sad Songs (Say So Much)"
Region	Certification	Certified units/sales
New Zealand (RMNZ)	Gold	15,000^{‡}
^{‡} Sales+streaming figures based on certification alone.
