= I'm Still Standing =

1983 single by Elton John

Single by Elton John

from the album Too Low for Zero
- B-side: "Love So Cold" (US); "Earn While You Learn" (UK)
- Released: April 1983 (US); 22 July 1983 (UK)
- Recorded: September–December 1982
- Genre: Synth-pop; new pop
- Length: 3:02
- Label: Geffen (US); Rocket (UK)
- Songwriters: Elton John; Bernie Taupin
- Producer: Chris Thomas

Elton John singles chronology
"I Guess That's Why They Call It the Blues" (1983)	"I'm Still Standing" (1983)	"Kiss the Bride" (1983)

Music video
- "I'm Still Standing" on YouTube

"I'm Still Standing" is a song written by British musician Elton John and lyricist Bernie Taupin, from John's 1983 studio album Too Low for Zero. It was the lead single from the album in North America, but released as the second single in the UK.

Helped by a video promoting the song on MTV, "I'm Still Standing" became a big hit for John on both sides of the Atlantic, peaking at No. 1 in Canada and Switzerland, No. 4 in the UK and No. 12 on the US Billboard Hot 100.

== Background ==
Although "I'm Still Standing" is often seen as a statement of John's resilience, Taupin wrote the lyrics with a specific person in mind.

It's perhaps one more example of the original idea being interpreted by everyone into something quite different. I think people see it as an anthem based on Elton's strong sense of survival in the face of adversity. Which, believe me, is perfectly fine by me. In fact, it's probably infinitely more interesting, perhaps, than what it was initially written about. Which, if my memory serves me correctly, it was a sort of kiss off to an old girlfriend. You know the sort of thing, 'Don't you worry about me, I'll be perfectly fine.' Unlike George Jones' 'She Thinks I Still Care,' where, in fact, he really did, I really didn't."

== Music video ==
The music video, directed by Russell Mulcahy, was shot in Cannes and Nice on the Côte d'Azur in France. It also features the colours of the flag of France in graphics. Arlene Phillips, who choreographed the routines performed on location in the video, said her work is one of the proudest moments in her entire career (via the Channel 5 pop-documentary, Britain's Favourite 80s Songs, on 25 December 2021).

Bruno Tonioli, later a judge on hit shows Strictly Come Dancing for BBC (UK), Dancing with the Stars for ABC (US) and Britain's Got Talent for ITV (UK), appears as one of the dancers in the video.

Initially, John was supposed to take part in the choreography for the music video, but that plan was later scrapped as he recalls in his autobiography:

Visibly stunned by my demonstration of the moves I’d honed on the dance floors of Crisco Disco and Studio 54, the choreographer Arlene Phillips went pale and suddenly scaled down my involvement in that side of things, until all I really had to do was click my fingers and walk along the seafront in time to the music.

It was due to be shot over the course of two days, but a camera full of the first day's film was ruined when Mulcahy accidentally fell into the sea with it. Therefore, it had to be filmed again on another day. During the shoot for the video, John came across Duran Duran. He complained he was exhausted at having been up since four o'clock in the morning. Simon Le Bon decided John should have a martini. "So I did," John later recalled, "I had six."

In his book, Wild Boy: My Life in Duran Duran, Andy Taylor writes of the experience:

There were lots of celebrities around in Cannes and one day we discovered that Elton John was in town, filming the video for his song "I'm Still Standing". This was before Elton became teetotal, so he was still a steaming party animal. We went up to see him at his hotel and spent the afternoon getting blasted on martinis. We decided it would be a laugh to get him drunk and we were slinging the drinks down him. "Ooh, you are lovely boys," he screeched, loving every minute of it. We got him so drunk that eventually he went upstairs and threw a wobbler in his suite. It caused all sorts of chaos, but it was a great party.

The next morning, John awoke with a hangover and wandered into his personal assistant's room – which was "leveled" – and asked him "What happened?" His assistant laughed: "You happened!"

In 2019, Vanderquest digitally restored the promotional video in 4K by re-scanning the original 16mm film negatives, reconstructing the edit from the original camera rushes, and recreating the computer graphics. This version of the video serves as the ending to the 2019 biopic Rocketman, with Taron Egerton (portraying John) rotoscoped in to recreate memorable scenes from the original music video. It was also re-released standalone on John's YouTube channel.

== Track listing ==
- US 7-inch single
1. "I'm Still Standing" – 3:00
2. "Love So Cold" – 5:08
- UK 7-inch single
1. "I'm Still Standing" – 3:00
2. "Earn While You Learn" – 6:42
- This single was also available as a picture disc shaped as a piano.
- UK 12-inch single
1. "I'm Still Standing" (extended version) – 3:45
2. "Earn While You Learn" – 6:42

== Personnel ==
- Elton John – lead vocals, acoustic piano, synthesizers
- Davey Johnstone – electric guitars, backing vocals
- Dee Murray – bass, backing vocals
- Nigel Olsson – drums, backing vocals

== Charts ==
=== Weekly charts ===
Chart (1983)	Peak position
Australia (Kent Music Report)	3
Belgium (Ultratop 50 Flanders)	11
Canada Top Singles (RPM)	1
Ireland (IRMA)	2
Israel (Kol Yisrael)	2
Luxembourg (Radio Luxembourg)	3
Netherlands (Single Top 100)	16
Netherlands (Dutch Top 40)	8
New Zealand (Recorded Music NZ)	29
South Africa (Springbok Radio)	9
Switzerland (Schweizer Hitparade)	1
UK Singles (Official Charts)	4
US Billboard Hot 100	12
US Adult Contemporary (Billboard)	28
US Mainstream Rock (Billboard)	34
US Cash Box Top 100	18
West Germany (GfK)	10

Chart (2019)	Peak position
Poland Airplay (ZPAV)	50

=== Year-end charts ===
Chart (1983)	Rank
Australia (Kent Music Report)	19
Canada Top Singles (RPM)	45
Switzerland (Schweizer Hitparade)	12
UK Singles (OCC)	49
US Billboard Hot 100	74

Chart (2023)	Rank
UK Singles (OCC)	97

== Certifications ==
Region	Certification	Certified units/sales
Australia (ARIA)	2× Platinum	140,000^{‡}
Austria (IFPI Austria)	Platinum	100,000^{*}
Denmark (IFPI Danmark)	2× Platinum	180,000^{‡}
Germany (BVMI)	Platinum	600,000^{‡}
Italy (FIMI) sales since 2009	Platinum	100,000^{‡}
New Zealand (RMNZ)	4× Platinum	120,000^{‡}
Spain (Promusicae)	2× Platinum	120,000^{‡}
United Kingdom (BPI) Physical	Silver	250,000^{^}
United Kingdom (BPI) Digital	4× Platinum	2,400,000^{‡}
United States (RIAA)	2× Platinum	2,000,000^{‡}
^{*} Sales figures based on certification alone.^{^} Shipments figures based on certification alone.^{‡} Sales+streaming figures based on certification alone.

== Other versions ==
Welsh actor Taron Egerton has recorded this song two times in separate occasions. The first time was for the 2016 animated feature Sing as teenage gorilla Johnny; the second was for the 2019 biopic Rocketman where he played the titular role of Elton John himself.
