= List of concerts held at the Olympiastadion Berlin =

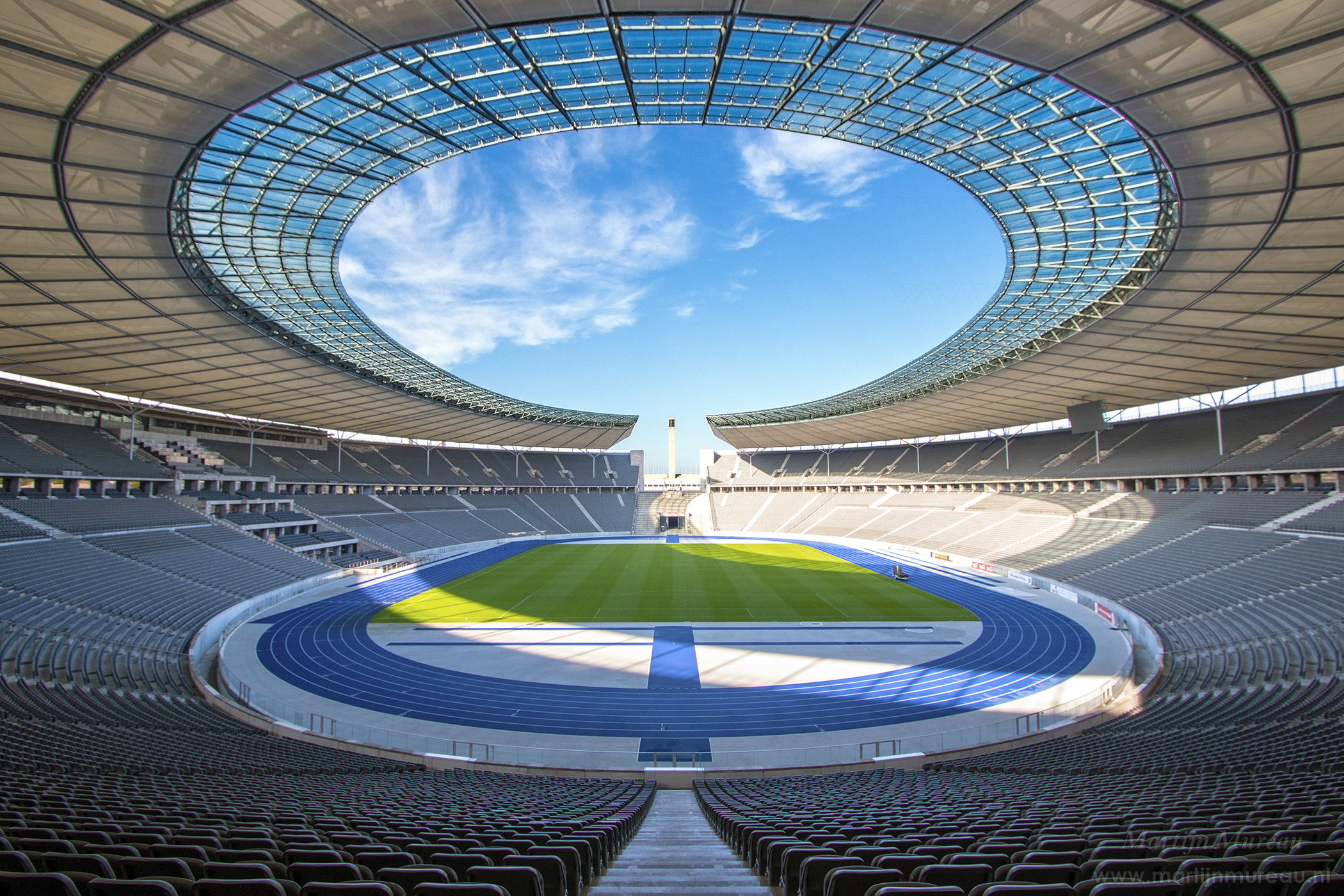
The Olympiastadion in September 2015

The Olympiastadion is a sport stadium located in Berlin, Germany. Originally built for the 1936 Summer Olympics, the stadium has been used for concerts and festivals since the early 1990s.

== Concerts ==
Date	Performer(s)	Opening act(s)	Tour	Attendance	Revenue	Ref.
6 June 1990	The Rolling Stones	Gun	Urban Jungle Tour	—N/a		
26 May 1992	Guns N' Roses	none	Use Your Illusion Tour	—N/a		
15 June 1993	U2	Stereo MCs, Die Toten Hosen	Zoo TV Tour	40,000	—N/a	
17 August 1995	The Rolling Stones	Big Country	Voodoo Lounge Tour	76,689 / 76,689	$3,588,645	
1 August 1997	Michael Jackson		HIStory World Tour	78,187 / 78,187	$2,934,036	
26 August 1998	The Rolling Stones	Big Country	Bridges to Babylon Tour	70,900 / 70,900	$4,194,917	
19 June 1999	Marius Müller-Westernhagen		Westernhagen Tour	75,000	—N/a	
21 July 2000	Tina Turner	Joe Cocker	Twenty Four Seven Tour	48,977 / 48,977	$1,858,172	
15 June 2003	The Rolling Stones		Licks Tour	60,000	—N/a	
7 July 2005	U2	Snow Patrol, Kaiser Chiefs	Vertigo Tour	70,443 / 70,443	$4,725,530	
21 July 2006	The Rolling Stones	Feeder	A Bigger Bang	44,989 / 65,995	$3,997,912	
27 July 2006	Robbie Williams		Close Encounters Tour	120,000	—N/a	
28 July 2006	Robbie Williams		Close Encounters Tour	120,000	—N/a	
13 June 2007	Herbert Grönemeyer		"12" Openair Tour	60,000	—N/a	
3 July 2007	Genesis		Turn It On Again: The Tour	57,434	$5,071,146	
28 August 2008	Madonna	Robyn	Sticky & Sweet Tour	47,368 / 47,368	$6,048,086	
10 June 2009	Depeche Mode	M83	Tour of the Universe	65,657 / 65,657	$5,222,754	
18 July 2009	U2	Snow Patrol	U2 360° Tour	88,265 / 88,265	$9,169,830	
22 June 2010	AC/DC	Volbeat	Black Ice World Tour	65,958		
5 June 2011	Herbert Grönemeyer		Schiffsverkehr	55,000	—N/a	
30 May 2012	Bruce Springsteen		Wrecking Ball World Tour	55,491 / 55,491	$4,514,798	
9 June 2013	Depeche Mode	Trentemøller	The Delta Machine Tour	66,388 / 66,388	$5,113,262	
4 September 2013	Roger Waters		The Wall Live (2010–13)	29,857 / 40,000	$3,299,137	
25 June 2015	AC/DC	Vintage Trouble	Rock or Bust World Tour	70,000 / 70,000		
4 July 2015	Helene Fischer		Farbenspiel Live	107,066 / 112,900	$6,902,606	
5 July 2015	Helene Fischer		Farbenspiel Live	107,066 / 112,900	$6,902,606	
14 July 2015	Udo Lindenberg		Panik Party 2015	50,000	—N/a	
19 June 2016	Bruce Springsteen		The River Tour 2016	66,464 / 66,464	$5,932,416	
29 June 2016	Coldplay	Lianne La Havas, Alessia Cara	A Head Full of Dreams Tour	68,047 / 68,047	$5,540,960	
22 June 2017	Depeche Mode	Algiers	Global Spirit Tour	68,157 / 68,157	$5,646,356	
12 July 2017	U2	Noel Gallagher's High Flying Birds	The Joshua Tree Tour 2017	71,039 / 71,039	$7,215,052	
3 June 2018	Guns N' Roses	Greta Van Fleet, Manic Street Preachers	Not in This Lifetime... Tour			
22 June 2018	The Rolling Stones	The Kooks	No Filter Tour	67,295 / 67,295	$12,113,470	
28 June 2018	Beyoncé & Jay Z		On the Run II Tour	57,155 / 57,155	$5,697,111	
8 July 2018	Helene Fischer	Ben Zucker	Helene Fischer Live 2017/2018	55,000		
19 July 2018	Ed Sheeran	Anne-Marie	÷ Tour	69,055 / 69,780	$6,392,576	
7 June 2019	Phil Collins	Mike and the Mechanics	Still Not Dead Yet Tour	52,126 / 58,014	$6,254,767	
22 June 2019	Rammstein	Duo Jatekok	Stadium Tour	72,367 / 72,367	$7,823,126	
6 July 2019	Metallica	Ghost, Bokassa	WorldWired Tour	68,452 / 68,452	$6,816,021	
14 July 2019	P!nk	Vance Joy, Bang Bang Romeo, KidCutUp	Beautiful Trauma World Tour	54,114 / 54,114	$5,649,498	
4 June 2022	Rammstein	Duo Jatekok	Rammstein Stadium Tour	TBA	TBA	
5 June 2022	Rammstein	Duo Jatekok	Rammstein Stadium Tour	TBA	TBA	
10 July 2022	Coldplay	London Grammar	Music of the Spheres World Tour	216,535 / 216,535	$20,389,784	
12 July 2022	Coldplay	H.E.R.	Music of the Spheres World Tour	216,535 / 216,535	$20,389,784	
13 July 2022	Coldplay	H.E.R.	Music of the Spheres World Tour	216,535 / 216,535	$20,389,784	
7 July 2023	Depeche Mode	Jehnny Beth	Memento Mori World Tour	141,839 / 141,839	$14,535,661	
9 July 2023	Depeche Mode	Hælos	Memento Mori World Tour	141,839 / 141,839	$14,535,661	
15 July 2023	Rammstein	Abélard	Rammstein Stadium Tour	TBA	TBA	
16 July 2023	Rammstein	Abélard	Rammstein Stadium Tour	TBA	TBA	
18 July 2023	Rammstein	Abélard	Rammstein Stadium Tour	TBA	TBA	
18 June 2025	Linkin Park	Grandson Architects	From Zero World Tour	TBA	TBA	
30 June 2025	AC/DC	The Pretty Reckless	Power Up Tour	TBA	TBA	
30 May 2026	Metallica	Gojira; Knocked Loose	M72 World Tour	93.200 / 93.200	$13.700.000	Higher boxscore and largest attendance at a single concert in the venue and Germany.
26 June 2026	Bruno Mars	DJ Pee .Wee; Victoria Monét	The Romantic Tour			
28 June 2026	Bruno Mars	DJ Pee .Wee; Victoria Monét	The Romantic Tour			
29 June 2026	Bruno Mars	DJ Pee .Wee; Victoria Monét	The Romantic Tour			
1 July 2026	Foo Fighters	Idles; Fat Dog	Take Cover Tour	TBA	TBA	

== Festivals ==
Date	Festival	Performer(s)	Attendance
8 September 2018	Lollapalooza	Various artists	70,000
9 September 2018	Lollapalooza	Various artists	70,000
7 September 2019	Lollapalooza	Various artists	85,000
8 September 2019	Lollapalooza	Various artists	85,000
