= Stately Home Tour =

2000 concert tour by Elton John

- Continental tour by Elton John
- Poster to the concert in Chelmsford, UK
- Location: Europe
- Start date: 27 May 2000
- End date: 30 July 2000
- Legs: 1
- No. of shows: 32 in total

Elton John concert chronology
- Medusa Tour (1999–2000); Stately Home Tour (2000); Face to Face 2001 (2001)

The Stately Home Tour was a 2000 concert tour by Elton John. After completing the Medusa Tour, Elton decided to tour some of the stately homes of Europe, mainly covering England and Germany. The tour started on 27 May 2000 in Bedfordshire and ended on 30 July 2000 in Edinburgh, Scotland.

The tour continued in the same way as the previous two tours Medusa Tour and An Evening with Elton John in the respect that they were all solo performances.

== Tour dates ==
Date	City	Country	Venue
Europe
27 May 2000	Bedfordshire	England	Woburn Abbey
29 May 2000	Bedfordshire	England	Woburn Abbey
3 June 2000	Derbyshire	England	Chatsworth House
4 June 2000	Derbyshire	England	Chatsworth House
6 June 2000	Hampshire	England	Broadlands
7 June 2000	Hampshire	England	Broadlands
11 June 2000	Berkshire	England	Highclere Castle
13 June 2000	Lincolnshire	England	Burghley House
14 June 2000	Lincolnshire	England	Burghley House
17 June 2000	Leoben	Austria	Hauptplatz
18 June 2000	Bregenz	Austria	Seebuhne
20 June 2000	Brescia	Italy	Stadio Mario Rigamonti
23 June 2000	Kassel	Germany	Schloss Wilhelmshöhe
24 June 2000	Hamburg	Germany	Derbypark
27 June 2000	Cologne	Germany	Kölnarena
28 June 2000	Coburg	Germany	Schlossplatz
30 June 2000	Leipzig	Germany	Volkerschlachtdenkmal
1 July 2000	Stuttgart	Germany	Schlossplatz
4 July 2000	Mannheim	Germany	Schloss Ehrenhof
5 July 2000	Koblenz	Germany	Schlosshof
7 July 2000	Kunzelsau	Germany	Schlosspark
8 July 2000	Munich	Germany	Konigsplatz
9 July 2000	London	England	Hyde Park
13 July 2000	Liverpool	England	King's Dock
15 July 2000	Chelmsford	England	Hylands Park
16 July 2000	Chelmsford	England	Hylands Park
19 July 2000	Port Talbot	Wales	Margam Country Park
22 July 2000	Northamptonshire	England	Castle Ashby
23 July 2000	Northamptonshire	England	Castle Ashby
27 July 2000	London	England	Hyde Park
29 July 2000	County Durham	England	Raby Castle
30 July 2000	Edinburgh	Scotland	Edinburgh Castle

== Setlists ==
Standard Setlist
1. Your Song
2. The Greatest Discovery
3. Border Song
4. Daniel
5. Harmony
6. Honky Cat
7. Rocket Man
8. Tiny Dancer
9. Philadelphia Freedom
10. Nikita
11. Sacrifice
12. Sorry Seems to be the Hardest Word
13. I Guess That's Why They Call It the Blues
14. Ticking
15. Carla/Etude
16. Tonight
17. Burn Down the Mission
18. The One
19. Blue Eyes
20. Empty Garden
21. Take Me to the Pilot
22. Crocodile Rock
23. Don't Let the Sun Go Down on Me
24. Circle of Life
25. Bennie and the Jets
26. Candle in the Wind
