= RheinEnergieStadion =

German football stadium in Cologne

Coordinates: 50°56′1″N 6°52′30″E

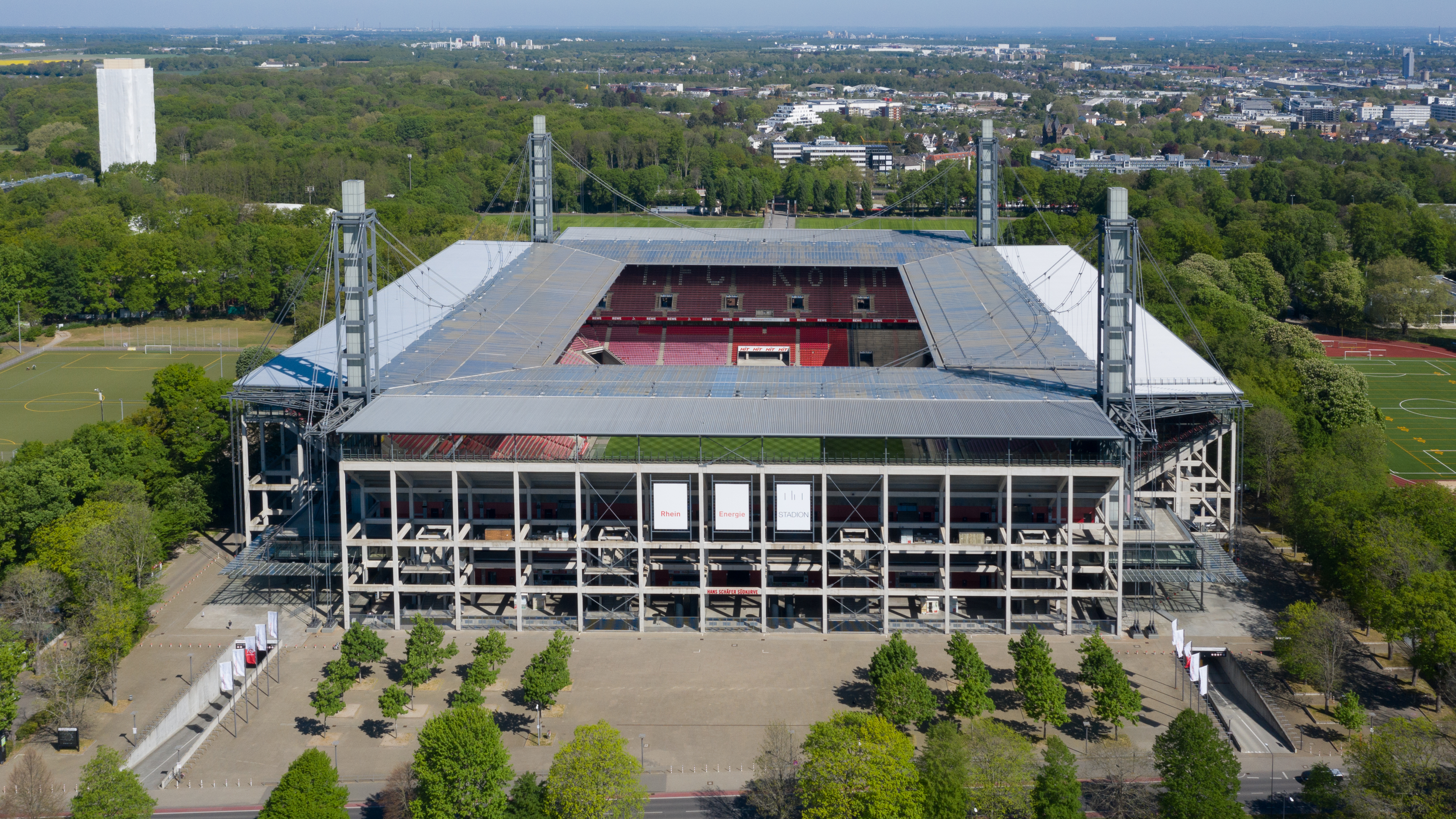
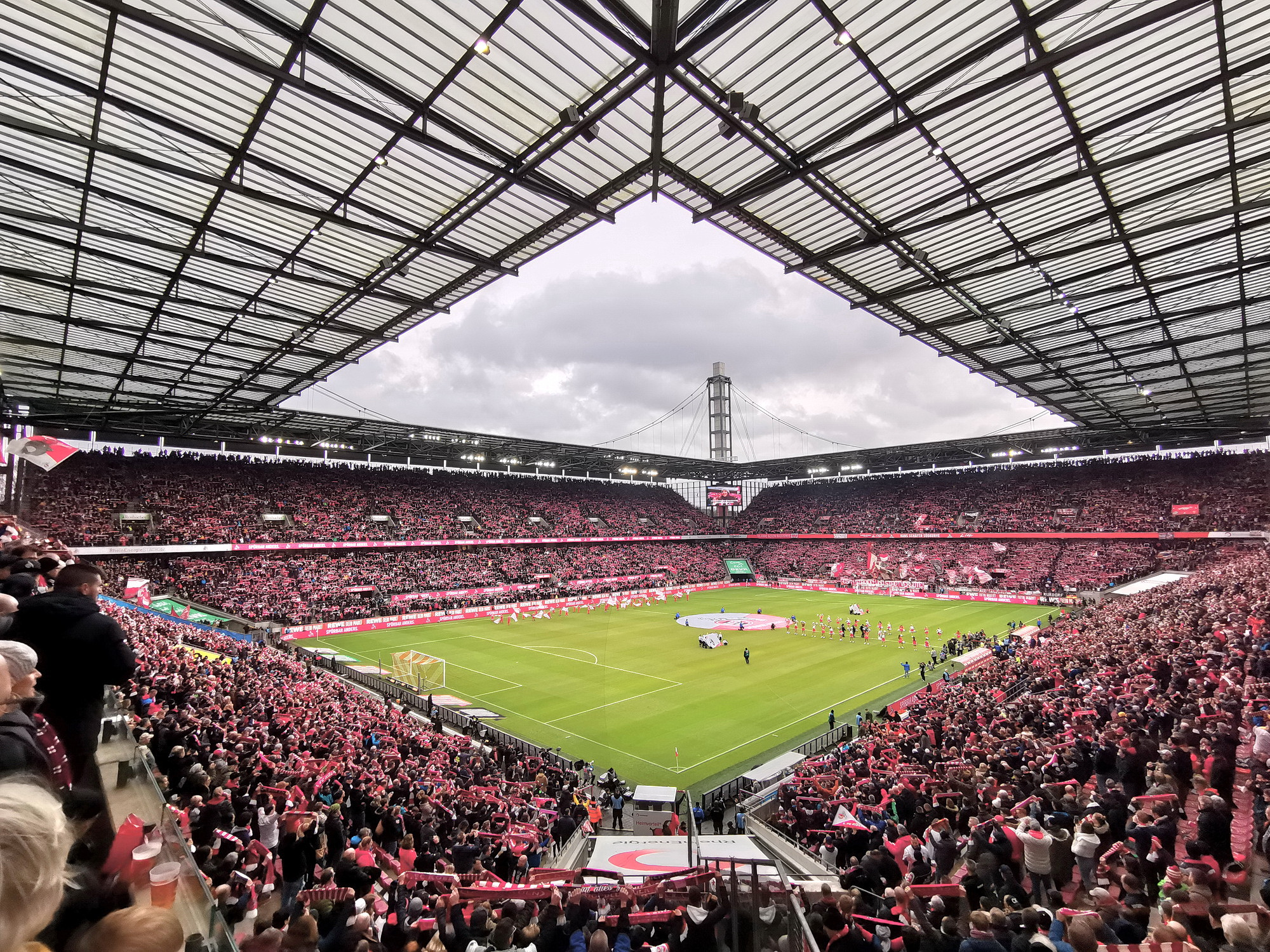
- UEFA
- Interactive map of RheinEnergieStadion
- Former names: Müngersdorfer Stadion (1923–2001)
- Address: Aachener Straße 999; 50933 Cologne, Germany
- Owner: Kölner Sportstätten GmbH
- Capacity: 50,000 (league matches); 45,965 (international matches)
- Field size: 105 m x 68 m
- Public transit: RheinEnergieStadion

Construction
- Groundbreaking: 12 October 1921
- Opened: 16 September 1923
- Renovated: 1972–1975, 2004
- Closed: 2001
- Demolished: 2001–2003
- Cost: DEM 47.4 million (DEM 22.9 million in 2021 Deutschmarks)

Tenants
- Kölner BC 01 (1923–1947); SpVgg Sülz 07 (1923–1947); 1. FC Köln (1948–present); Cologne Centurions (2004–2007); FC Viktoria Köln (selected matches); Germany national football team (selected matches)

Website
- https://www.rheinenergiestadion.de/
- Building details

General information
- Renovated: 31 January 2004
- Renovation cost: €117.4 million

Renovating team
- Architect: Gerkan, Marg und Partner
- Structural engineer: Schlaich Bergermann Partner
- Services engineer: HL-Technik
- Main contractor: Max Bögl

RheinEnergieStadion, formerly Müngersdorfer Stadion (German pronunciation: [ˌʁaɪnʔenɛʁˈɡiːˌʃtaːdi̯ɔn]) or Müngersdorfer Stadium, is a German football stadium in Cologne. It was built on the site of the two previous Müngersdorfer stadiums. It is the home of the local 1. Bundesliga team, 1. FC Köln. The stadium was one of eight stadiums to host UEFA Euro 1988. It was one of five stadiums hosting both the 2005 FIFA Confederations Cup and 2006 FIFA World Cup, hosted the 2020 UEFA Europa League final behind closed doors due to the COVID-19 pandemic in Europe, and was one of ten host stadia for the UEFA Euro 2024. Local energy company RheinEnergie AG currently holds the naming rights to the stadium; hence it was known as the Stadion Köln for the final.

== History ==
Under the terms of the Treaty of Versailles (1919), the fortifications of Cologne were removed, thus allowing for the building of a new structure in the surrounding area. The new construction enabled the city to create 15,000 jobs. The new stadium was called the Müngersdorfer Stadion. This allowed Cologne not only to help stabilize the country, but also to gain prestige and economic benefits for the city. The cost was tallied at 47.4 million Deutsche Mark.

Following the completion of the stadium, the city began to gain prominence in the domestic sports world. Many major football matches were held at the stadium in front of huge crowds. The first international match was held on 20 November 1927, when the Germany national team drew 2–2 with the Netherlands. Since then, the German team has played 19 times at the stadium, and only one of those matches resulted in a loss. Another notable match was the first post-war game, which saw 1. FC Nürnberg beat 1. FC Kaiserslautern 2–1, in front of a crowd of 75,000.

One of the specialties of the Müngersdorfer Stadion was the track meets for non-professional sportsmen. In 1929, there were over 38,000 participants. However, in 1933, Jews were no longer allowed to take part. After the war, the stadium has only hosted professional level sports.

== Recent matches of importance ==
In 2005, the stadium was a venue for three first-round games of the FIFA Confederations Cup, including the opening match between Argentina and Tunisia. The game was won by Argentina 2–1.

The Müngersdorfer has been host to many important UEFA Cup matches. Bayer Leverkusen played against Barcelona, and Galatasaray against Monaco in the 1988–89 European Cup. Borussia Mönchengladbach played both Arsenal and Monaco in the 1996–97 UEFA Cup. The stadium also functioned as the home ground to second-tier Alemannia Aachen in their 2004–05 UEFA Cup campaign.

Following the COVID-19 pandemic in Europe, the 2020 UEFA Europa League Final was moved from the Stadion Energa Gdańsk in Gdańsk, Poland to the RheinEnergieStadion, to be played behind closed doors. Sevilla won the match, defeating Inter Milan 3–2.

== Awards ==
In July 2004, the RheinEnergieStadion was awarded a bronze medal for distinguished sporting and leisure facilities by the International Olympic Committee.

== Concerts ==
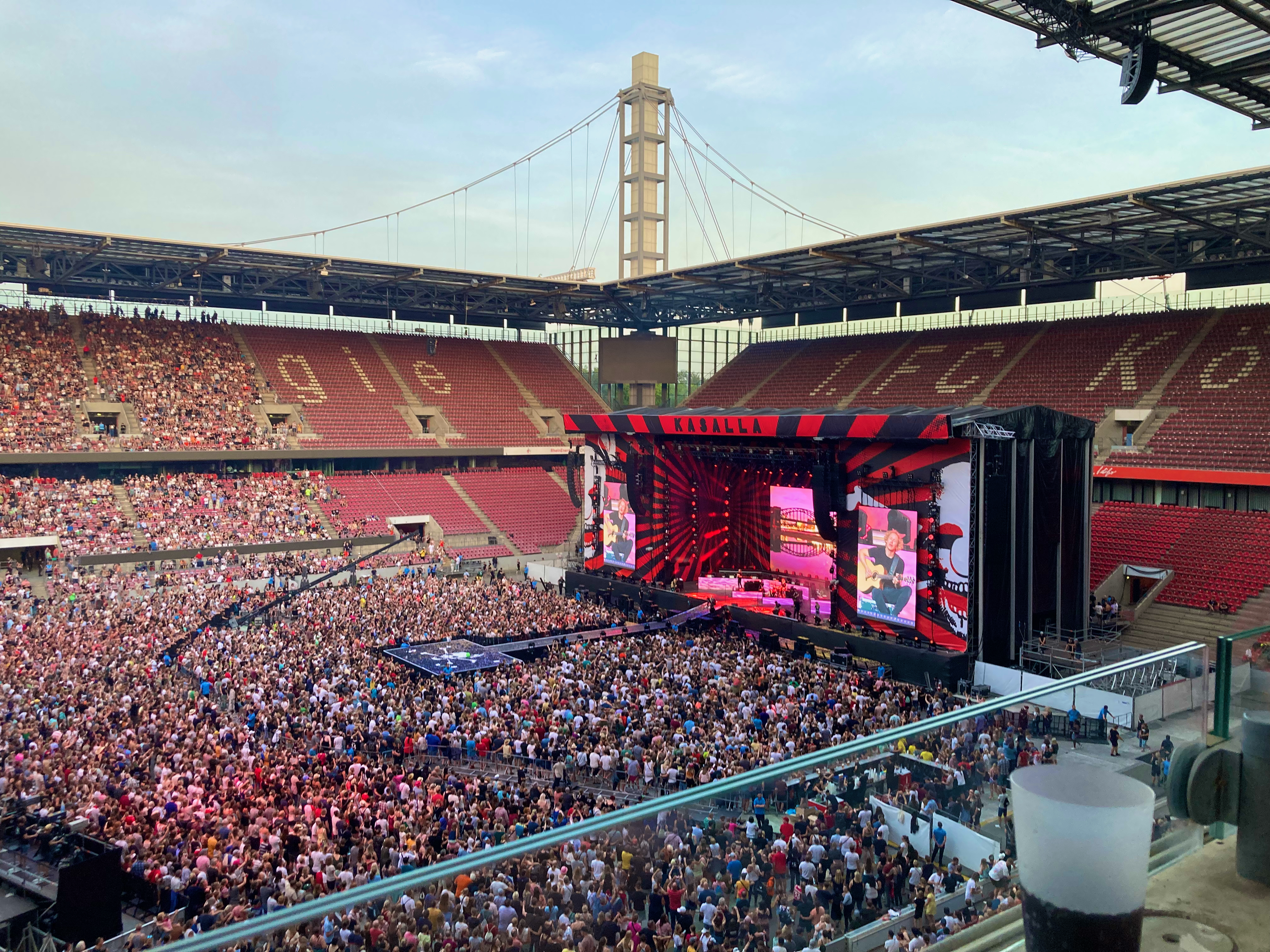
Kasalla at the RheinEnergieStadion, 2022.

list of concerts at RheinEnergieStadion
Date	Performer	Event	Attendance	Ref(s)
As Müngersdorfer Stadion
4 and 5 July 1982	The Rolling Stones	European Tour 1982	—	
17 June 1983	Supertramp	—	—	
16 June 1984	Bob Dylan, Santana	Bob Dylan/Santana European Tour 1984	—	
19 July 1986	Queen	The Magic Tour	—	
17 June 1987	U2	The Joshua Tree Tour		
3 July 1988	Michael Jackson	Bad	—	
18 June 1989	Pink Floyd	A Momentary Lapse of Reason Tour	—	
26 May 1990	Tina Turner	Foreign Affair: The Farewell Tour	—	
30 and 31 May 1990	The Rolling Stones	Urban Jungle Tour	—	
30 May 1992	Guns N' Roses	Use Your Illusion Tour	—	
11 July 1992	Michael Jackson	Dangerous World Tour	—	
17 July 1992	Dire Straits	On Every Street Tour	—	
18 July 1992	Dire Straits	On Every Street Tour	—	
27 July 1992	Genesis	We Can't Dance Tour		
2 August 1994	Pink Floyd	The Division Bell Tour	—	
20 June 1995	The Rolling Stones	Voodoo Lounge Tour	—	
27 July 1996	Tina Turner	Wildest Dreams Tour	—	
3 June 1997	Michael Jackson	HIStory World Tour	60,000	
5 June 1999	Wolfgang Petry	Einfach geil... Open Air 1999	—	
20 June 1999	The Rolling Stones	No Security Tour	—	
28 July 2000	Tina Turner	Twenty Four Seven Tour	—	
20 June 2001	Bon Jovi	One Wild Night Tour	—	
8 July 2001	AC/DC	Stiff Upper Lip World Tour	—	
11 August 2001	Robbie Williams	Weddings, Barmitzvahs & Stadiums Tour	—	
As RheinEnergieStadion
6 July 2005	Queen + Paul Rodgers	Queen + Paul Rodgers Tour		
23 July 2006	The Rolling Stones	A Bigger Bang Tour		
19 May 2009	AC/DC	Black Ice World Tour	45,724 / 45,724	
31 December 2009	Die Fantastischen Vier			
29 May 2010	P!nk	The Funhouse Summer Carnival Tour		
13 June 2011	Herbert Grönemeyer			
16 July 2011	Nina Hagen	Brings Jubilee Concert		
27 May 2012	Bruce Springsteen and the E Street Band	Wrecking Ball World Tour	40,417 / 40,417	
4 September 2012	Coldplay	Mylo Xyloto Tour	43,952 / 43,952	
22 June 2013	Bon Jovi	Because We Can Tour	42,476 / 42,476	
15 June 2015	Helene Fischer	Farbenspiel Live	74,000 / 74,000	
16 June 2015	Helene Fischer	Farbenspiel Live	74,000 / 74,000	
27 May 2016	Queen + Adam Lambert	Queen + Adam Lambert 2016 Summer Festival Tour		
28 July 2016	Rihanna	Anti World Tour		
10 September 2016	Unheilig	Unheilig Tour 2015 / 2016		
5 June 2017	Depeche Mode	Global Spirit Tour	42,032 / 42,032	
3 July 2018	Beyoncé and Jay-Z	On the Run II Tour	39,501 / 39,501	
13 June 2019	Metallica	WorldWired Tour	41,460 / 42,021	
21 June 2019	Phil Collins	Not Dead Yet Tour	41,460 / 42,021	
22 June 2019	Phil Collins	Not Dead Yet Tour	41,460 / 42,021	
29 June 2019	Muse	Simulation Theory World Tour	40,400 / 42,526	
5 July 2019	P!nk	Beautiful Trauma World Tour	77,313 / 77,313	
6 July 2019	P!nk	Beautiful Trauma World Tour	77,313 / 77,313	
11 October 2021	Moop Mama	Semester Kick Off 2021		
4 June 2022	Die Ärzte	Buffalo Bill in Rom Tour		
10 June 2022	Die Toten Hosen	40 Jahre - Alles aus Liebe		
17 June 2022	Kasalla			
2 July 2022	Iron Maiden	Legacy of the Beast World Tour		
5 July 2022	Red Hot Chili Peppers	Red Hot Chili Peppers 2022–2024 Global Stadium Tour	39,394 / 39,394	
9 June 2023	Muse	Will of the People World Tour		
15 June 2023	Beyoncé	Renaissance World Tour	41,166 / 41,166	
8 July 2023	P!nk	Summer Carnival		
9 July 2023	P!nk	Summer Carnival		
9 September 2023	AnnenMayKantereit	Live 2023		
20 July 2024	Travis Scott	Circus Maximus Tour	42,068 / 42,068	
2 July 2025	Kendrick Lamar & SZA	Grand National Tour	36,896	
19 June 2027	Scooter	Rave from Outer Space Stadium Tour	Upcoming	

== Renovation ==
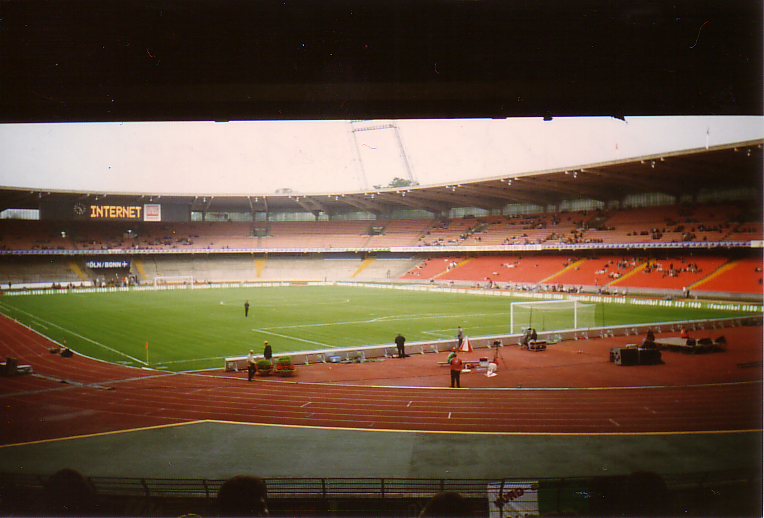
The stadium in 1997

There have been two renovations, from 1972 to 1975 and from 2002 to 2004.

In 1974, the World Cup was held in West Germany, and Cologne had wanted to be a host city. The city's bid was approved and it soon began work on a new stadium that was to replace the now outdated Müngersdorfer Stadion. However, the city was unable to raise the money needed for a stadium of the desired size. The original plan was for an 80,000-seat arena, which was planned to have cost 23.5 million Deutsche Mark. But the total kept growing. In the end, if the stadium had been completed, the cost would have amounted to 93.5 million. At the time, the city was able to provide only an extra 6 million Deutsche Mark.

Following the World Cup, Cologne still wanted the stadium completed. Hence, on 12 November 1975, a 61,000-seat arena was inaugurated with a match between 1. FC Köln and SC Fortuna Köln, 1. FC Köln winning 1–0. In this configuration the stadium hosted the UEFA Euro 1988.

With the news of the prospect of bringing the World Cup back to Germany, the city reacted and started renovation of the stadium, which was completed in 2003. Unlike previous configurations, there are no track-and-field facilities, allowing spectators to be much closer to the pitch than they might have been in a traditional continental multi-purpose stadium.

== Facilities ==
The capacity is about 50,000 people during club matches and 45,965 for international games, when terracing is not allowed. The entire field is lit with a floodlight system. In the north grandstand there is a museum dedicated to 1. FC Köln.

== External dimensions ==
Length	220 m
Width	180 m
Height to Roof	33.25 m
Roof Area	15,400 m^{2}

== 2006 FIFA World Cup ==
The stadium was one of the venues for the 2006 FIFA World Cup. However, due to sponsorship contracts, the arena was called "FIFA World Cup Stadium Cologne" during the World Cup.

The following games were played at the stadium during the World Cup of 2006:

Date	Time (CET)	Team #	Res.	Team #2	Round	Attendance
11 June 2006	21:00	Angola	0–1	Portugal	Group D	45,000
17 June 2006	17:00	Czech Republic	0–2	Ghana	Group E	45,000
20 June 2006	18:00	Sweden	2–2	England	Group B	45,000
23 June 2006	21:00	Togo	0–2	France	Group G	45,000
26 June 2006	21:00	Switzerland	0–0 (0–3p)	Ukraine	Round of 16	45,000

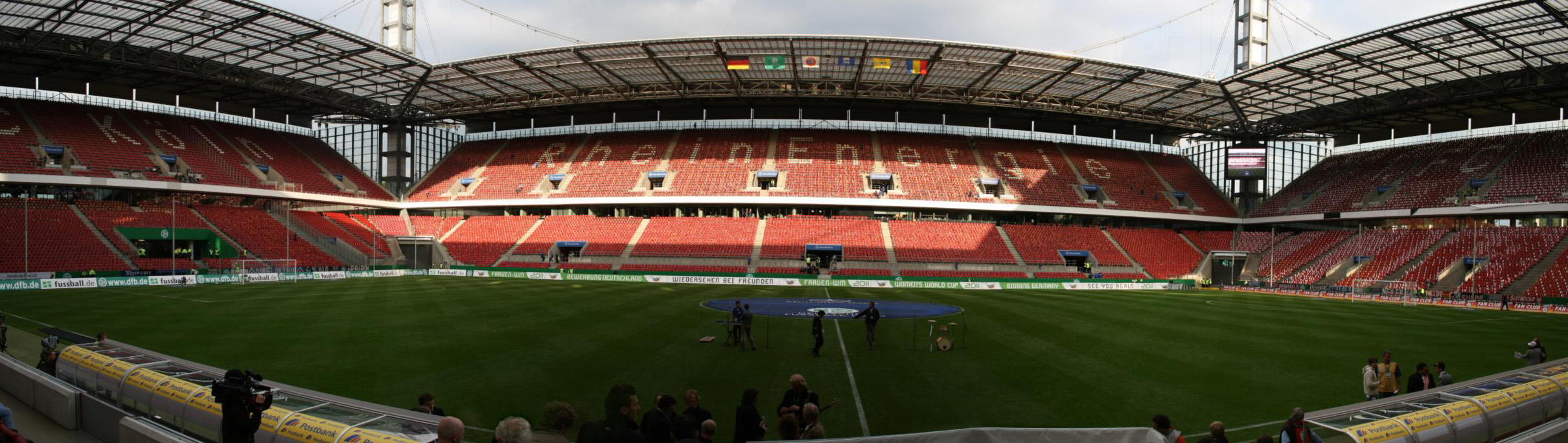
Panoramic view of the stadium

== UEFA Euro 2024 ==
The stadium was one of the venues for the UEFA Euro 2024. However, due to sponsorship contracts, the arena was called "Cologne Stadium" during the tournament.

The following games were played at the stadium during the tournament:

Date	Time (CEST)	Team #1	Result	Team #2	Round	Spectators
15 June 2024	15:00	Hungary	1–3	Switzerland	Group A	41,676
19 June 2024	21:00	Scotland	1–1	Switzerland	Group A	42,711
22 June 2024	21:00	Belgium	2–0	Romania	Group E	42,535
25 June 2024	21:00	England	0–0	Slovenia	Group C	41,536
30 June 2024	21:00	Spain	4–1	Georgia	Round of 16	42,233

== Transportation ==
The stadium is part of Sportpark Müngersdorf, adjacent to Aachener Straße. It is accessible by car via the Cologne Beltway, only some 1200 m off the Bundesautobahn 1. The Cologne Stadtbahn provides service at RheinEnergieStadion through the line 1.

== See also ==
- List of football stadiums in Germany
- Lists of stadiums

Preceded by Baku Olympic Stadium; Baku	UEFA Europa League; Final venue 2020	Succeeded by Stadion Gdańsk; Gdańsk
