= List of Scooter concert tours =

There has been 17 tours since Scooter’s founding in 1993. Scooter normally tour to promote their newest albums, or milestones, such as the Thirty Rough & Dirty Tour in 2023. And the 20 Years of Hardcore Tour in 2014.

Scooter normally use laser shows and pyrotechnics as well as having dancers doing specific styles of dance, including Melbourne Shuffle and jumpstyle. Frontman H. P. Baxxter normally shouts phrases to be mimicked by the crowd between songs and to sing along during the chorus

== …and the Beat Goes On! Tour ==
All locations are in Germany

1. Neumünster, Schleswig-Holstein, Germany (15 March 1995)
2. Bad Oldesloe, Schleswig-Holstein, Germany (16 March 1995)
3. Herford, North Rhine-Westphalia, Germany (17 March 1995)
4. Magdeburg, Saxony-Anhalt, Germany (22 March 1995)
5. Braunschweig, Lower Saxony, Germany (23 March 1995)
6. Frankfurt, Oder, Brandenburg, Germany (24 March 1995)
7. Altenburg, Thuringia, Germany (25 March 1995)
8. Burghausen, Bavaria, Germany (26 March 1995)
9. Bayreuth, Bavaria, Germany (30 March 1995)
10. Iserlohn, North Rhine-Westphalia, Germany (31 March 1995)
11. Pahlen, Schleswig-Holstein, Germany (1 April 1995)
12. Hamburg, Germany (2 April 1995)
13. Apen, Lower Saxony, Germany (4 April 1995)
14. Hückeswagen, North Rhine-Westphalia, Germany (6 April 1995)
15. Kehl, Baden-Württemberg, Germany (7 April 1995)
16. Laupheim, Baden-Wüttemberg, Germany (8 April 1995)
17. Worbis, Thuringia, Germany (13 April 1995)
18. Schüttorf, Lower Saxony, Germany (14 April 1995)
19. Cuxhaven, Lower Saxony, Germany (15 April 1995)
20. Bevern, Lower Saxony, Germany (15 April 1995)
21. Neustadt, Rhineland-Palatinate, Germany (16 April 1995)
22. Hamburg, Germany (17 April 1995)
23. Bremerhaven, State of Bremen, Germany (22 April 1995)
24. Hannover, Lower Saxony, Germany (22 July 1995)

== Back in The U.K. Tour ==
1. Aschaffenburg, Bavaria, Germany (17 November 1995)
2. Dessau, Saxony-Anhalt, Germany (18 November 1995)
3. Wusterhausen, Brandenburg, Germany (19 November 1995)
4. Rostock, Mecklenburg-Vorpommern, Germany (21 November 1995)
5. Neubrandenburg, Mecklenburg-Vorpommern, Germany (22 November 1995)
6. Schwerin, Mecklenburg-Vorpommern, Germany (23 November 1995)
7. Wismar, Mecklenburg-Vorpommern, Germany (24 November 1995)
8. Magdeburg, Saxony-Anhalt, Germany (25 November 1995)
9. Cork, County Cork, Ireland (1 December 1995)
10. Dublin, Leinster, Ireland (2 December 1995)
11. Leer, Lower Saxony, Germany (6 December 1995)
12. Göttingen, Lower Saxony, Germany (7 December 1995)
13. Wildeshausen, Lower Saxony, Germany (8 December 1995)
14. Karlsruhe, Baden-Württemberg, Germany (12 December 1995)
15. Koblenz, Rhineland-Palatinate, Germany (13 December 1995)
16. Schwäbisch, Baden-Wüttemberg, Germany (14 December 1995)
17. Untermeitingen, Bavaria, Germany (15 December 1995)

== Our Happy Hardcore Tour ==
1. Katowice, Silesian Voivodeship, Poland (2 June 1996)

== Age of Love Tour ==
Last tour to feature Ferris Bueller (Sören Buehler)

=== Baltic Tour ===
1. Tallinn, Harju County, Estonia (7 March 1997)
2. Vilnius, Vilnius County, Lithuania (9 March 1997)

=== Age of Love Tour ===
1. Pahlen, Schleswig-Holstein, Germany (11 September 1997)
2. Oelde, North Rhine-Westphalia, Germany (12 September 1997)
3. Frankfurt, Hesse, Germany (14 September 1997)
4. Stuttgart, Baden-Württemberg, Germany (15 September 1997)
5. Kaufbeuren, Bavaria, Germany (16 September 1997)
6. Munich, Bavaria, Germany (17 September 1997)
7. Augsburg, Bavaria, Germany (19 September 1997)
8. Kaiserslautern, Rhineland-Palatinate, Germany (20 September 1997)
9. Düsseldorf, North Rhine-Westphalia, Germany (21 September 1997)
10. Braunschweig, Lower Saxony, Germany (22 September 1997)
11. Kiel, Schleswig-Holstein, Germany (24 September 1997)
12. Hanover, Lower Saxony, Germany (25 September 1997)
13. Potsdam, Brandenburg, Germany (26 September 1997)
14. Berlin, Germany (28 September 1997)
15. Lübeck, Schleswig-Holstein, Germany (29 September 1997)
16. Uelzen, Lower Saxony, Germany (30 September 1997)
17. Melle, Lower Saxony, Germany (1 October 1997)
18. Schüttorf, Lower Saxony, Germany (3 October 1997)
19. Hof, Bavaria, Germany (4 October 1997)
20. Gera, Thuringia, Germany (6 October 1997)
21. Suhl, Thuringia, Germany (7 October 1997)
22. Erfurt, Thuringia, Germany (8 October 1997)
23. Dortmund, North Rhine-Westphalia, Germany (9 October 1997)
24. Hamburg, Germany (12 October 1997)

== Rough & Tough & Dangerous Tour ==
1. Moscow, Russia (27 February 1998)
2. Saint Petersburg, Russia (28 February 1998)
3. Tallinn, Harju County, Estonia (3 March 1998)
4. Tallinn, Harju County, Estonia (4 March 1998)
5. Riga, Latvia (6 March 1998)
6. Kaunas, Kaunas County, Lithuania (8 March 1998)

== No Time To Chill Tour ==
First tour to feature Axel Coon (Axel Broszeit)

=== No Time To Chill Tour ===
1. Rendsburg, Schleswig-Holstein, Germany (7 January 1999)
2. Cuxhaven, Lower Saxony, Germany (8 January 1999)
3. Bremen, State of Bremen, Germany (9 January 1999)
4. Hamburg, Germany (10 January 1999)
5. Hanover, Lower Saxony, Germany (12 January 1999)
6. Cologne, North Rhine-Westphalia, Germany (13 January 1999)
7. Aachen, North Rhine-Westphalia, Germany (15 January 1999)
8. Neu-Isenburg, Hesse, Germany (16 January 1999)
9. Stuttgart, Baden-Württemberg, Germany (18 January 1999)
10. Lörrach, Baden-Wüttemberg, Germany (19 January 1999)
11. Leipzig, Saxony, Germany (21 January 1999)
12. Augsburg, Bavaria, Germany (22 January 1999)
13. Ulm, Baden-Wüttemberg, Germany (23 January 1999)
14. Nuremberg, Bavaria, Germany (25 January 1999)
15. Berlin, Germany (26 January 1999)
16. Magdeburg, Saxony-Anhalt, Germany (27 January 1999)
17. Munich, Bavaria, Germany (28 January 1999)
18. Łódź, Łódź Voivodeship, Poland (11 February 1999)
19. Budapest, Hungary (15 February 1999)
20. Bratislava, Bratislava Region, Slovakia (16 February 1999)
21. Brno, South Moravian Region, Czech Republic (17 February 1999)
22. Prague, Czech Republic (22 February 1999)
23. Helsinki, Uusimaa, Finland (24 February 1999) (CANCELLED)
24. Tampere, Pirkanmaa, Finland (25 February 1999) (CANCELLED)
25. Moscow, Russia (26 February 1999)
26. Saint Petersburg, Russia (27 February 1999)
27. Saint Petersburg, Russia (27 February 1999)

=== Baltic & Ukrainian Tour ===
1. Vilnius, Vilnius County, Lithuania (10 September 1999)
2. Riga, Latvia (11 September 1999)
3. Tallinn, Harju County, Estonia (12 September 1999)
4. Dnipro, Dnipropetrovsk Oblast, Ukraine (15 September 1999)
5. Poltava, Poltava Oblast, Ukraine (16 September 1999)
6. Kharkiv, Kharkiv Oblast, Ukraine (17 September 1999)
7. Kyiv, Kyiv Oblast, Ukraine (18 September 1999)

== Sheffield Tour ==
1. Pahlen, Schleswig-Holstein, Germany (9 September 2000)
2. Berlin, Germany (10 September 2000)
3. Hamburg, Germany (11 September 2000)
4. Bremen, State of Bremen, Germany (12 September 2000)
5. Leipzig, Saxony, Germany (14 September 2000)
6. Herford, North Rhine-Westphalia, Germany (15 September 2000)
7. Sande, Lower Saxony, Germany (16 September 2000)
8. Cologne, North Rhine-Westphalia (17 September 2000)
9. Offenbach, Hesse, Germany (19 September 2000)
10. Würzburg, Bavaria, Germany (20 September 2000)
11. Warburg, North Rhine-Westphalia, Germany (22 September 2000)
12. Ulm, Baden-Württemberg, Germany (23 September 2000)
13. Borlänge, Dalarna, Sweden (14 October 2000)
14. Gdańsk, Pomeranian Voivodeship, Poland (18 October 2000) (CANCELLED)
15. Koszalin, West Pomeranian Voivodeship, Poland (19 October 2000)
16. Szczecin, West Pomeranian Voivodeship, Poland (20 October 2000)
17. Toruń, Kuyavian–Pomeranian Voivodeship, Poland (21 October 2000)
18. Saint Petersburg, Russia (24 October 2000) (CANCELLED)
19. Moscow, Russia (25 October 2000)

== Push the Beat for This Jam Tour ==
Last tour to feature Axel Coon (Axel Broszeit)

=== Poland Tour ===
1. Katowice, Silesian Voivodeship, Poland (15 November 2001)
2. Warsaw, Masovian Voivodeship, Poland (16 November 2001)
3. Kielce, Świętokrzyskie Voivodeship, Poland (17 November 2001)

=== PTBFTJ Tour ===
1. Erfurt, Thuringia, Germany (9 January 2002)
2. Dresden, Saxony, Germany (10 January 2002)
3. Leipzig, Saxony, Germany (11 January 2002)
4. Berlin, Germany (13 January 2002)
5. Magdeburg, Saxony-Anhalt, Germany (14 January 2002)
6. Hanover, Lower Saxony, Germany (15 January 2002)
7. Braunschweig, Lower Saxony, Germany (16 January 2002)
8. Bremen, State of Bremen, Germany (18 January 2002)
9. Bielefeld, North Rhine-Westphalia, Germany (19 January 2002)
10. Oberhausen, North Rhine-Westphalia, Germany (20 January 2002)
11. Cologne, North Rhine-Westphalia, Germany (21 January 2002)
12. Düsseldorf, North Rhine-Westphalia, Germany (23 January 2002)
13. Mannheim, Baden-Württemberg, Germany (24 January 2002)
14. Ulm, Baden-Wüttemberg, Germany (25 January 2002)
15. Heilbronn, Baden-Wüttenberg, Germany (26 January 2002)
16. Karlsruhe, Baden-Wüttenberg, Germany (28 January 2002)
17. Stuttgart, Baden-Wüttenberg, Germany (29 January 2002)
18. Munich, Bavaria, Germany (31 January 2002)
19. Tuttlingen, Baden-Wüttemberg, Germany (1 February 2002)
20. Nuremberg, Bavaria, Germany (2 February 2002)
21. Hamburg, Germany (3 February 2002)

== We Like It Loud! Tour ==
First tour to feature Jay Frog (Jurgen Frosch)

1. Morbach, Rhineland-Palatinate, Germany (17 January 2004)
2. Augsburg, Bavaria, Germany (19 January 2004)
3. Munich, Bavaria, Germany (20 January 2004)
4. Nuremberg, Bavaria, Germany (21 January 2004)
5. Durlach, Baden-Württemberg, Germany (23 January 2004)
6. Blankenburg, Saxony-Anhalt, Germany (24 January 2004)
7. Hanover, Lower Saxony, Germany (26 January 2004)
8. Cottbus, Brandenburg, Germany (27 January 2004)
9. Berlin, Germany (28 January 2004)
10. Leipzig, Saxony, Germany (30 January 2004)
11. Magdeburg, Saxony-Anhalt, Germany (31 January 2004)
12. Dortmund, North Rhine-Westphalia, Germany (2 February 2004) (CANCELLED)
13. Wolfsburg, Lower Saxony, Germany (3 February 2004)
14. Bielefeld, North Rhine-Westphalia, Germany (4 February 2004)
15. Mannheim, Baden-Wüttemberg, Germany (6 February 2004)
16. Mainz, Rhineland-Palatinate, Germany (7 February 2004)
17. Frankfurt, Hesse, Germany (9 February 2004)
18. Cologne, North Rhine-Westphalia, Germany (10 February 2004)
19. Düsseldorf, North Rhine-Westphalia, Germany (11 February 2004)
20. Stuttgart, Baden-Wüttemberg, Germany (12 February 2004)
21. Memmingen, Bavaria, Germany (14 February 2004)
22. Zurich, Canton of Zurich, Switzerland (15 February 2004)
23. Graz, Styria, Austria (17 February 2004)
24. Dortmund, North Rhine-Westphalia, Germany (20 February 2004)
25. Bremen, State of Bremen, Germany (21 February 2004)
26. Dresden, Saxony, Germany (22 February 2004)
27. Hamburg, Germany (23 February 2004)
28. Hamburg, Germany (24 February 2004)
29. St. Pölten, Lower Austria, Austria (10 July 2004)

== Who’s Got the Last Laugh Now? Tour ==
Last tour to feature Jay Frog (Jurgen Frosch)

1. Hanover, Lower Saxony, Germany (6 March 2006)
2. Berlin, Germany (7 March 2006)
3. Munich, Bavaria, Germany (8 March 2006)
4. Leipzig, Saxony, Germany (10 March 2006)
5. Zwickau, Saxony, Germany (11 March 2006)
6. Dresden, Saxony, Germany (12 March 2006)
7. Vienna, Austria (14 March 2006)
8. Mannheim, Baden-Württemberg, Germany (16 March 2006)
9. Karlsruhe, Baden-Wüttemberg, Germany (17 March 2006)
10. Zurich, Canton of Zurich, Switzerland (18 March 2006)
11. Filderstadt, Baden-Wüttenberg, Germany (20 March 2006)
12. Cologne, North Rhine-Westphalia, Germany (21 March 2006)
13. Dortmund, North Rhine-Westphalia, Germany (22 March 2006)
14. Emden, Lower Saxony, Germany (24 March 2006)
15. Bremen, State of Bremen, Germany (25 March 2006)
16. Hamburg, Germany (26 March 2006)

== Lass uns Tanzen Clubtour ==
First tour to feature Michael Simon

=== European Clubtour ===
1. Krems an der Donau, Lower Austria, Austria (30 March 2007)
2. Dülmen, North Rhine-Westphalia, Germany (5 April 2007)
3. St Martin, Lower Austria, Austria (6 April 2007)
4. Kiel, Schleswig-Holstein, Germany (7 April 2007)
5. Schwerin, Mecklenburg-Vorpommern, Germany (8 April 2007)
6. Vienna, Austria (13 April 2007)
7. Magdeburg, Saxony-Anhalt, Germany (14 April 2007)
8. Ibbenbüren, North Rhine-Westphalia, Germany (20 April 2007)
9. Oyten, Lower Saxony, Germany (21 April 2007)
10. Salzburg, State of Salzburg, Austria (26 April 2007)
11. Innsbruck, Tyrol, Austria (27 April 2007)
12. Hennef, North Rhine-Westphalia, Germany (28 April 2007)
13. Mengen, Baden-Wüttenberg, Germany (30 April 2007)
14. Leipzig, Saxony, Germany (4 May 2007)
15. Schwarzheide, Brandenburg, Germany (5 May 2007)
16. Melle, Lower Saxony, Germany (11 May 2007)
17. Bayreuth, Bavaria, Germany (12 May 2007)
18. Aachen, North Rhine-Westphalia, Germany (16 May 2007)
19. Hanover, Lower Saxony, Germany (18 May 2007)
20. Mühldorf, Bavaria, Germany (19 May 2007)

=== Australian Clubtour ===
1. Adelaide, South Australia, Australia (16 November 2007)
2. Liverpool, New South Wales, Australia (17 November 2007)
3. Perth, Western Australia, Australia (23 November 2007)
4. Brisbane, Queensland, Australia (24 November 2007)

== Jumping All Over the World Tour ==
=== Clubland Live! UK Tour ===
1. Belfast, United Kingdom (6 March 2008 and 27 November 2008)
2. Aberdeen, United Kingdom (7 March 2008 and 28 November 2008)
3. Newcastle, United Kingdom (8 March 2008 and 30 November 2008)
4. London, United Kingdom (12 March 2008)
5. Birmingham, United Kingdom (13 March 2008 and 3 December 2008)
6. Manchester, United Kingdom (14 March 2008 and 4 December 2008)
7. Glasgow, United Kingdom (15 March 2008 and 29 November 2008)
8. Hull, United Kingdom (5 December 2008)

=== JAOTW Tour ===
1. Karlsruhe, Baden-Württemberg, Germany (27 March 2008)
2. Dresden, Saxony, Germany (28 March 2008)
3. Leipzig, Saxony, Germany (29 March 2008)
4. Vienna, Austria (31 March 2008)
5. Munich, Bavaria, Germany (1 April 2008)
6. Fürth, Bavaria, Germany (2 April 2008)
7. Zurich, Switzerland (3 April 2008)
8. Hamburg, Germany (5 April 2008)
9. Berlin, Germany (6 April 2008)
10. Dortmund, North Rhine-Westphalia, Germany (7 April 2008)
11. Offenbach, Hesse, Germany 9 April 2008)
12. Bremen, State of Bremen, Germany (10 April 2008)
13. Magdeburg, Saxony-Anhalt, Germany (11 April 2008)
14. Cologne, North Rhine-Westphalia, Germany (12 April 2008)
15. Kazan, Russia (1 May 2008) (CANCELLED) (CLUB TOUR)
16. Moscow, Russia (2 May 2008) (CANCELLED) (CLUB TOUR)
17. Prague, Czech Republic (28 May 2008)
18. Berlin, State of Berlin, Germany (1 August 2008)
19. Bonn, North Rhine-Westphalia, Germany (8 May 2008) (CANCELLED)
20. New York, United States (15 August 2008)
21. Hartford, United States (16 August 2008)
22. Herford, North Rhine-Westphalia, Germany (23 August 2008) (CANCELLED)
23. Moscow, Russia (26 September 2008)
24. Düsseldorf, North Rhine-Westphalia, Germany (18 December 2008)
25. Bielefeld, North Rhine-Westphalia, Germany (20 December 2008)

== Under the Radar Over the Top Tour ==
=== Stuff The Turkey X-Mas Tour ===
1. Rostock, Mecklenburg-Vorpommern, Germany (2 December 2010)
2. Dresden, Saxony, Germany (3 December 2010)
3. Erfurt, Thuringia, Germany (4 December 2010)
4. Wiesbaden, Hesse, Germany (6 December 2010)
5. Bremen, State of Bremen, Germany (7 December 2010)
6. Dortmund, North Rhine-Westphalia, Germany (8 December 2010)
7. Regensburg, Bavaria, Germany (10 December 2010)
8. Stuttgart, Baden-Württemberg, Germany (11 December 2010)
9. Freiburg, Baden-Wüttemberg, Germany (12 December 2010)

=== UTROTT Tour ===
1. Cologne, North Rhine-Westphalia, Germany (11 March 2010)
2. Hamburg, Germany (12 March 2010)
3. Berlin, Germany (13 March 2010)
4. Zurich, Canton of Zurich, Switzerland (15 March 2010)
5. Rastatt, Baden-Württemberg, Germany (16 March 2010)
6. Munich, Bavaria, Germany (18 March 2010)
7. Essen, North Rhine-Westphalia, Germany (19 March 2010)
8. Leipzig, Saxony, Germany (20 March 2010)

== The Big Mash Up Tour ==
1. Hamburg, Germany (22 March 2012)
2. Aachen, North Rhine-Westphalia, Germany (23 March 2012)
3. Saarbrücken, Saarland, Germany (24 March 2012)
4. Frankfurt, Hesse, Germany (26 March 2012)
5. Essen, North Rhine-Westphalia, Germany (27 March 2012)
6. Bremen, State of Bremen, Germany (29 March 2012)
7. Bielefeld, North-Rhine Westphalia, Germany (30 March 2012)
8. Leipzig, Saxony, Germany (31 March 2012)
9. Kempten, Bavaria, Germany (2 April 2012)
10. Zurich, Canton of Zurich, Switzerland (3 April 2012)
11. Munich, Bavaria, Germany (4 April 2012)
12. Berlin, Germany (6 April 2012)

== 20 Years of Hardcore Tour ==
Last tour to feature Rick J. Jordan (Hendrik Stedler)

1. Lingen, Lower Saxony, Germany (7 January 2014)
2. Hanover, Lower Saxony, Germany (9 January 2014)
3. Leipzig, Saxony, Germany (10 January 2014)
4. Berlin, Germany (11 January 2014)
5. Bamberg, Bavaria, Germany (14 January 2014) (CANCELLED)
6. Munich, Bavaria, Germany (16 January 2014)
7. Stuttgart, Baden-Württemberg, Germany (17 January 2014)
8. Düsseldorf, North Rhine-Westphalia, Germany (18 January 2014)
9. Freiburg, Baden-Wüttemberg, Germany (19 January 2014) (CANCELLED)
10. Bremen, State of Bremen, Germany (19 January 2014)
11. Offenbach, Hesse, Germany (21 January 2014) (CANCELLED)
12. Frankfurt, Hesse, Germany (21 January 2014)
13. Dortmund, North Rhine-Westphalia, Germany (23 January 2014)
14. Hamburg, Germany (24 January 2014)

== Can’t Stop The Hardcore Tour ==
First tour to feature Phil Speiser

1. Düsseldorf, North Rhine-Westphalia, Germany (26 February 2016)
2. Stuttgart, Baden-Württemberg, Germany (27 February 2016)
3. Munich, Bavaria, Germany (28 February 2016)
4. Zurich, Canton of Zurich, Switzerland (29 February 2016)
5. Berlin, Germany (3 March 2016)
6. Leipzig, Saxony, Germany (4 March 2016)
7. Hamburg, Germany (5 March 2016)

== 25 Years Wild & Wicked Tour ==
Last tour to feature Phil Speiser and first and only tour to feature Etnik Zarari

1. Leipzig, Saxony, Germany (7 July 2017)
2. Mönchengladbach, North Rhine-Westphalia, Germany (8 July 2017)
3. Tallinn, Harju County, Estonia (23 August 2017)
4. Riga, Latvia (25 November 2017)
5. Berlin, Germany (15 February 2018)
6. Hamburg, Germany (16 February 2018)
7. Düsseldorf, Germany (17 February 2018)
8. Zurich, Canton of Zurich, Switzerland (19 February 2018)
9. Vienna, Austria (20 February 2018)
10. Rostock, Mecklenburg-Vorpommern, Germany (23 February 2018)
11. Stuttgart, Baden-Württemberg, Germany (24 February 2018)
12. Stuttgart, Baden-Wüttemberg, Germany (25 February 2018)
13. Munich, Bavaria, Germany (26 February 2018)
14. Kaunas, Kaunas County, Lithuania (3 March 2018)
15. Belfast, United Kingdom (4 May 2018)
16. Glasgow, United Kingdom (5 May 2018)
17. London, United Kingdom (6 May 2018)
18. Budapest, Hungary (9 June 2018)
19. Ufa, Bashkortostan, Russia (29 June 2018)
20. Moscow, Russia (30 June 2018)
21. Sochi, Krasnodar Krai, Russia (4 July 2018) (CANCELLED)
22. Völklingen, Saarland, Germany (13 July 2018)
23. Hamburg, Germany (17 August 2018)
24. Dresden, Saxony, Germany (18 August 2018)
25. Giessen, Hesse, Germany (24 August 2018)
26. Beverungen, North Rhine-Westphalia, Germany (25 August 2018)
27. Melbourne, Victoria, Australia (27 September 2018)
28. Adelaide, South Australia, Australia (28 September 2018)
29. Sydney, New South Wales, Australia (29 September 2018)
30. Brisbane, Queensland, Australia (6 October 2018)
31. Perth, Western Australia, Australia (7 October 2018) (CANCELLED)
32. (RE) Moscow, Russia (2 November 2018) (CANCELLED)
33. (RE) Ufa, Bashkortostan, Russia (4 November 2018) (CANCELLED)
34. Helsinki, Uusimaa, Finland (8 November 2018)
35. Kuopio, North Savo, Finland (9 November 2018)
36. Oulu, North Ostrobothnia, Finland (10 November 2018)
37. Prague, Czech Republic (12 November 2018)
38. Amsterdam, North Holland, Netherlands (26 November 2018)
39. Paris, France (27 November 2018)
40. Nuremberg, Bavaria, Germany (30 November 2018)
41. Erfurt, Thuringia, Germany (1 December 2018)
42. Mannheim, Baden-Wüttemberg, Germany (3 December 2018)
43. Hanover, Lower Saxony, Germany (4 December 2018)
44. Dortmund, North Rhine-Westphalia, Germany (6 December 2018)
45. Amsterdam, North Holland, Netherlands (7 December 2018)
46. Bremen, State of Bremen, Germany (8 December 2018)

== God Save The Rave Tour ==
This tour was postponed due to the Coronavirus pandemic meaning various shows got cancelled, these cancelled shows can be seen here:

This was the last tour to feature Michael Simon and first and last show to feature Sebastian Schilde

=== 2020 ===
1. Saint Petersburg, Russia (12 March 2020)
2. Moscow, Russia (14 March 2020)

=== 2021 ===
1. Belfast, United Kingdom (28 August 2021)
2. Belfast, United Kingdom (29 August 2021)
3. Wrocław, Lower Silesian Voivodeship, Poland (25 October 2021)
4. Katowice, Silesian Voivodeship, Poland (26 October 2021)
5. Warsaw, Masovian Voivodeship, Poland (30 October 2021)

=== 2022 ===
1. Manchester, United Kingdom (30 April 2022)
2. London, United Kingdom (1 May 2022)
3. Hanover, Lower Saxony, Germany (11 May 2022)
4. Düsseldorf, North Rhine-Westphalia, Germany (13 May 2022)
5. Bremen, State of Bremen, Germany (14 May 2022)
6. Munich, Bavaria, Germany (17 May 2022)
7. Stuttgart, Baden-Wüttemberg, Germany (18 May 2022)
8. Zurich, Canton of Zurich, Switzerland (19 May 2022)
9. Esch-sur-Alzette, Luxembourg (21 May 2022)
10. Antwerp, Flanders, Belgium (22 May 2022)
11. Amsterdam, North Holland, Netherlands (23 May 2022)
12. Kiel, Schleswig-Holstein, Germany (25 May 2022)
13. Vienna, Austria (27 May 2022)
14. Dresden, Saxony, Germany (28 May 2022)
15. Glasgow, United Kingdom (10 June 2022)
16. Belfast, United Kingdom (25 June 2022)
17. Kassel, Hesse, Germany (18 August 2022)
18. Halle, Saxony-Anhalt, Germany (19 August 2022)
19. Spandau, Berlin, Germany (20 August 2022)
20. Lingen, Lower Saxony, Germany (26 August 2022)
21. Hamburg, Germany (27 August 2022)
22. Plzeň, Czech Republic (6 October 2022)
23. Ústí nad Labem, Czech Republic (7 October 2022)
24. Pardubice, Czech Republic (8 October 2022)
25. Dublin, Leinster, Ireland (8 December 2022)

=== 2023 ===
1. Leinefelde, Thuringia, Germany (10 June 2023)
2. Karlsruhe, Baden-Württemberg, Germany (22 June 2023)
3. Saarbrücken, Saarland, Germany (14 July 2023)
4. Balingen, Baden-Wüttemberg, Germany (22 July 2023)
5. Sylt, Schleswig-Holstein, Germany (28 July 2023)
6. Giessen, Hesse, Germany (25 August 2023)
7. Hemer, North Rhine-Westphalia, Germany (2 September 2023)

== Thirty, Rough and Dirty! Tour ==
First tour to feature returning Jay Frog and new member Marc Blou

1. Stuttgart, Baden-Württemberg, Germany (28 March 2024)
2. Bremen, State of Bremen, Germany (29 March 2024)
3. Hamburg, Germany (30 March 2024)
4. Rostock, Mecklenburg-Vorpommern, Germany (2 April 2024)
5. Frankfurt, Hesse, Germany (4 April 2024)
6. Amsterdam, North Holland, Netherlands (5 April 2024)
7. Dortmund, North Rhine-Westphalia, Germany (6 April 2024)
8. Berlin, Germany (9 April 2024)
9. Munich, Bavaria, Germany (11 April 2024)
10. Vienna, Austria (12 April 2024)
11. Nuremberg, Bavaria, Germany (13 April 2024)
12. Zurich, Canton of Zurich, Switzerland (16 April 2024)
13. Freiburg, Baden-Wüttemberg, Germany (17 April 2024)
14. Aberdeen, United Kingdom (30 October 2024)
15. Glasgow, United Kingdom (31 October 2024)
16. Dublin, Leinster, Ireland (2 November 2024)
17. Birmingham, United Kingdom (4 November 2024)
18. Newcastle, United Kingdom (5 November 2024)
19. Manchester, United Kingdom (7 November 2024)
20. London, United Kingdom (8 November 2024)
21. Cardiff, United Kingdom (9 November 2024)
22. Hanover, Lower Saxony, Germany (21 November 2024)
23. Leipzig, Saxony, Germany (22 November 2024)
24. Cologne, North Rhine-Westphalia, Germany (23 November 2024)
25. Lingen, Lower Saxony, Germany (8 August 2025)
26. Dresden, Saxony, Germany (15 August 2025)
27. Losheim am See, Saarland, Germany (22 August 2025)
28. Berlin, Germany (29 August 2025)
29. Hamburg, Germany (30 August 2025)
30. Essen, North Rhine-Westphalia, Germany (6 September 2025)

=== Rave From Outer Space Stadium Tour ===
1. RheinEnergieSTADION, Koln, North Rhine-Westphalia, Germany (19 June 2027)
2. Rudolf-Harbig-Stadion, Dresden, Saxony, Germany (26 June 2027)
