= Medusa Tour =

1999–2000 concert tour by Elton John

- Tour by Elton John
- Poster to the concert in Stuttgart, Germany
- Location: Europe • North America
- Start date: 23 September 1999
- End date: 10 December 2000
- Legs: 5
- No. of shows: 79 in total

Elton John concert chronology
- An Evening with Elton John (1999); Medusa Tour (1999–2000); Stately Home Tour (2000)

The Medusa Tour was a concert tour by Elton John that lasted from 1999 to 2000. The tour was a continuation of the previous tour, An Evening with Elton John. The tour started on 23 September 1999 in Jacksonville, Florida and came to an end on 10 December 2000 in Montgomery, Alabama.

After visiting Europe in the summer of 2000, Elton John and the band performed Greatest Hits Live. This was a set of three concerts, two of which were at Madison Square Garden in New York City. The two shows at Madison Square Garden were recorded and released as Elton John One Night Only – The Greatest Hits.

== Tour dates ==
Date	City	Country	Venue	Tickets sold / available	Revenue
North America (first leg)
23 September 1999	Jacksonville	United States	Jacksonville Coliseum		
24 September 1999	Atlanta	United States	Philips Arena	18,919 / 18,919	$966,802
25 September 1999	Paradise	United States	MGM Grand Garden Arena	8,500 / 8,500	$1,760,020
28 September 1999	Springfield	United States	BoS Center		
29 September 1999	Rockford	United States	MetroCentre		
1 October 1999	Champaign	United States	Assembly Hall		
2 October 1999	Moline	United States	MARK of the Quad Cities		
6 October 1999	Daytona Beach	United States	Ocean Center		
8 October 1999	Savannah	United States	Savannah Civic Center		
9 October 1999	Augusta	United States	Richmond County Civic Center		
12 October 1999	Boston	United States	Fleet Center	17,158 / 17,158	$828,093
15 October 1999	New York City	United States	Madison Square Garden	38,172 / 38,172	$2,097,980
16 October 1999	New York City	United States	Madison Square Garden	38,172 / 38,172	$2,097,980
27 October 1999	Mobile	United States	Mobile Civic Center		
29 October 1999	North Little Rock	United States	Alltel Arena	16,255 / 16,255	$724,649
30 October 1999	Oklahoma City	United States	The Myriad		
3 November 1999	Omaha	United States	Omaha Civic Auditorium		
6 November 1999	Minneapolis	United States	Target Center	16,167 / 16,167	$848,644
9 November 1999	Chicago	United States	Arie Crown Theater	11,722 / 11,722	$919,610
10 November 1999	Chicago	United States	Arie Crown Theater	11,722 / 11,722	$919,610
12 November 1999	Chicago	United States	Arie Crown Theater	11,722 / 11,722	$919,610
15 November 1999	Winnipeg	Canada	Winnipeg Arena	15,350 / 15,350	$734,625
17 November 1999	Calgary	Canada	Canadian Airlines Saddledome	17,448 / 17,448	$715,077
18 November 1999	Edmonton	Canada	Skyreach Centre	17,078 / 17,078	$735,924
20 November 1999	Vancouver	Canada	GM Place	18,192 / 18,192	$823,673
30 December 1999	Las Vegas	United States	Thomas & Mack Center	10,598 / 12,072	$3,091,801
North America (second leg)
7 January 2000	Honolulu	United States	Blaisdell Arena	25,191 / 25,191	$1,525,815
8 January 2000	Honolulu	United States	Blaisdell Arena	25,191 / 25,191	$1,525,815
9 January 2000	Honolulu	United States	Blaisdell Arena	25,191 / 25,191	$1,525,815
4 February 2000	Columbia	United States	Carolina Coliseum	9,117 / 9,117	$389,653
5 February 2000	Fayetteville	United States	Crown Coliseum	10,216 / 10,216	$408,056
8 February 2000	Lubbock	United States	United Spirit Arena		
9 February 2000	Valley Center	United States	Kansas Coliseum		
11 February 2000	Albuquerque	United States	Tingley Coliseum		
12 February 2000	Las Cruces	United States	Pan American Center	12,738 / 12,738	$601,560
15 February 2000	Tucson	United States	Tucson Convention Center		
20 February 2000	Reno	United States	Lawlor Events Center	12,240 / 12,240	$729,900
17 March 2000	Lakeland	United States	Lakeland Center		
18 March 2000	Albany	United States	Albany Civic Center		
5 April 2000	Binghamton	United States	Veterans Memorial Arena		
7 April 2000	Portland	United States	County Civic Center		
8 April 2000	Amherst	United States	Mullins Center	9,535 / 10,587	$463,974
9 April 2000	Erie	United States	Tullio Arena		
14 April 2000	Evansville	United States	Roberts Stadium	8,073 / 12,577	$379,705
15 April 2000	Indianapolis	United States	Conseco Fieldhouse	12,750 / 15,620	$674,650
18 April 2000	Syracuse	United States	Oncenter War Memorial Arena		
19 April 2000	Trenton	United States	Sovereign Bank Arena		
21 April 2000	Wilkes-Barre	United States	First Union Arena		
22 April 2000	Hershey	United States	Hersheypark Arena	8,950 / 8,950	$488,570
25 April 2000	Beaumont	United States	Montagne Center		
28 April 2000	Birmingham	United States	BJCC		
29 April 2000	Atlanta	United States	Philips Arena		
Europe
31 May 2000	Copenhagen	Denmark	Rosenborg Castle		
1 June 2000	Reykjavík	Iceland	Laugardalsvöllur		
9 September 2000	Athens	Greece	Odeon of Herodes Atticus		
10 September 2000	Athens	Greece	Odeon of Herodes Atticus		
16 September 2000	Marbella	Spain	Estadio De Futbol		
Greatest Hits Live
18 October 2000	Wilkes-Barre	United States	First Union Arena		
20 October 2000	New York City	United States	Madison Square Garden		
21 October 2000	New York City	United States	Madison Square Garden		
Europe
3 November 2000	Estoril	Portugal	Unknown Venue		
11 November 2000	Paris	France	L'Olympia		
13 November 2000	Oslo	Norway	Oslo Spektrum		
14 November 2000	Oslo	Norway	Oslo Spektrum		
16 November 2000	Antwerp	Belgium	Sportpaleis		
18 November 2000	Rotterdam	Netherlands	Ahoy Arena		
19 November 2000	Hanover	Germany	Hanover Arena		
21 November 2000	Frankfurt	Germany	Festhalle Frankfurt		
22 November 2000	Dortmund	Germany	Westfalenhallen		
24 November 2000	Zurich	Switzerland	Hallenstadion		
25 November 2000	Vienna	Austria	Wiener Stadthalle		
27 November 2000	Florence	Italy	Palasport		
28 November 2000	Milan	Italy	The Forum		
North America
2 December 2000	Bossier City	United States	CenturyTel Center		
3 December 2000	Tulsa	United States	Tulsa Convention Center		
5 December 2000	Johnson City	United States	Freedom Hall		
6 December 2000	Wheeling	United States	Wheeling Civic Center		
8 December 2000	Macon	United States	Macon Coliseum		
9 December 2000	Albany	United States	Albany Civic Center		
10 December 2000	Montgomery	United States	Garrett Coliseum		

== Set lists ==
Standard early US set list
1. Your Song
2. The Greatest Discovery
3. Someone Saved My Life Tonight
4. Border Song
5. Daniel
6. Harmony
7. Honky Cat
8. Rocket Man
9. Tiny Dancer
10. Philadelphia Freedom
11. Nikita
12. Sacrifice
13. Sorry Seems to Be the Hardest Word
14. I Guess That's Why They Call It the Blues
15. Ticking
16. Carla/Etude
17. Tonight
18. Burn Down the Mission
19. The One
20. Blue Eyes
21. Empty Garden (Hey Hey Johnny)
22. Take Me to the Pilot
23. Crocodile Rock
24. Don't Let the Sun Go Down on Me
25. Circle of Life
26. Bennie and the Jets
27. Candle in the Wind
Standard European set list
1. Your Song
2. The Greatest Discovery
3. Someone Saved My Life Tonight
4. Border Song
5. Daniel
6. Harmony
7. Honky Cat
8. Rocket Man
9. Tiny Dancer
10. Philadelphia Freedom
11. American Triangle
12. Nikita
13. Sacrifice
14. Sorry Seems to Be the Hardest Word
15. I Guess That's Why They Call it the Blues
16. Ticking
17. Carla/Etude
18. Tonight
19. Burn Down the Mission
20. The One
21. Blue Eyes
22. Take Me to the Pilot
23. Crocodile Rock
24. Don't Let the Sun Go Down on Me
25. Circle of Life
26. Bennie and the Jets
27. Candle in the Wind
Greatest Hits Live set list
1. Funeral for a Friend/Love Lies Bleeding
2. Candle in the Wind
3. Bennie and the Jets
4. Goodbye Yellow Brick Road
  with Billy Joel
5. Someone Saved My Life Tonight
6. Little Jeannie
7. Philadelphia Freedom
8. Tiny Dancer
9. Can You Feel The Love Tonight
10. Daniel
11. Rocket Man
12. Club At The End Of The Street
13. Blue Eyes
14. I Guess That's Why They Call It the Blues
  with Mary J. Blige
15. The One
16. I Don't Wanna Go On with You Like That
17. Sorry Seems to Be the Hardest Word
18. Sacrifice
19. Come Together
20. Your Song
  with Ronan Keating
21. Sad Songs (Say So Much)
  with Bryan Adams
22. I'm Still Standing
23. Crocodile Rock
24. Saturday Nights Alright for Fighting
  with Anastacia
25. The Bitch Is Back
26. Don't Let the Sun Go Down on Me
27. Don't Go Breaking My Heart
  with Kiki Dee
Standard later US set list
1. Your Song
2. The Greatest Discovery
3. Someone Saved My Life Tonight
4. Border Song
5. Daniel
6. Harmony
7. Honky Cat
8. Rocket Man
9. Tiny Dancer
10. Philadelphia Freedom
11. American Triangle
12. Nikita
13. Sorry Seems to Be the Hardest Word
14. I Guess That's Why They Call It the Blues
15. Ticking
16. Carla/Etude
17. Tonight
18. Take Me to the Pilot
19. The One
20. Blue Eyes
21. Crocodile Rock
22. Don't Let the Sun Go Down on Me
23. Circle of Life
24. Bennie and the Jets
25. Candle in the Wind
