= Lanxess Arena =

Indoor arena in Cologne, Germany

LANXESS arena

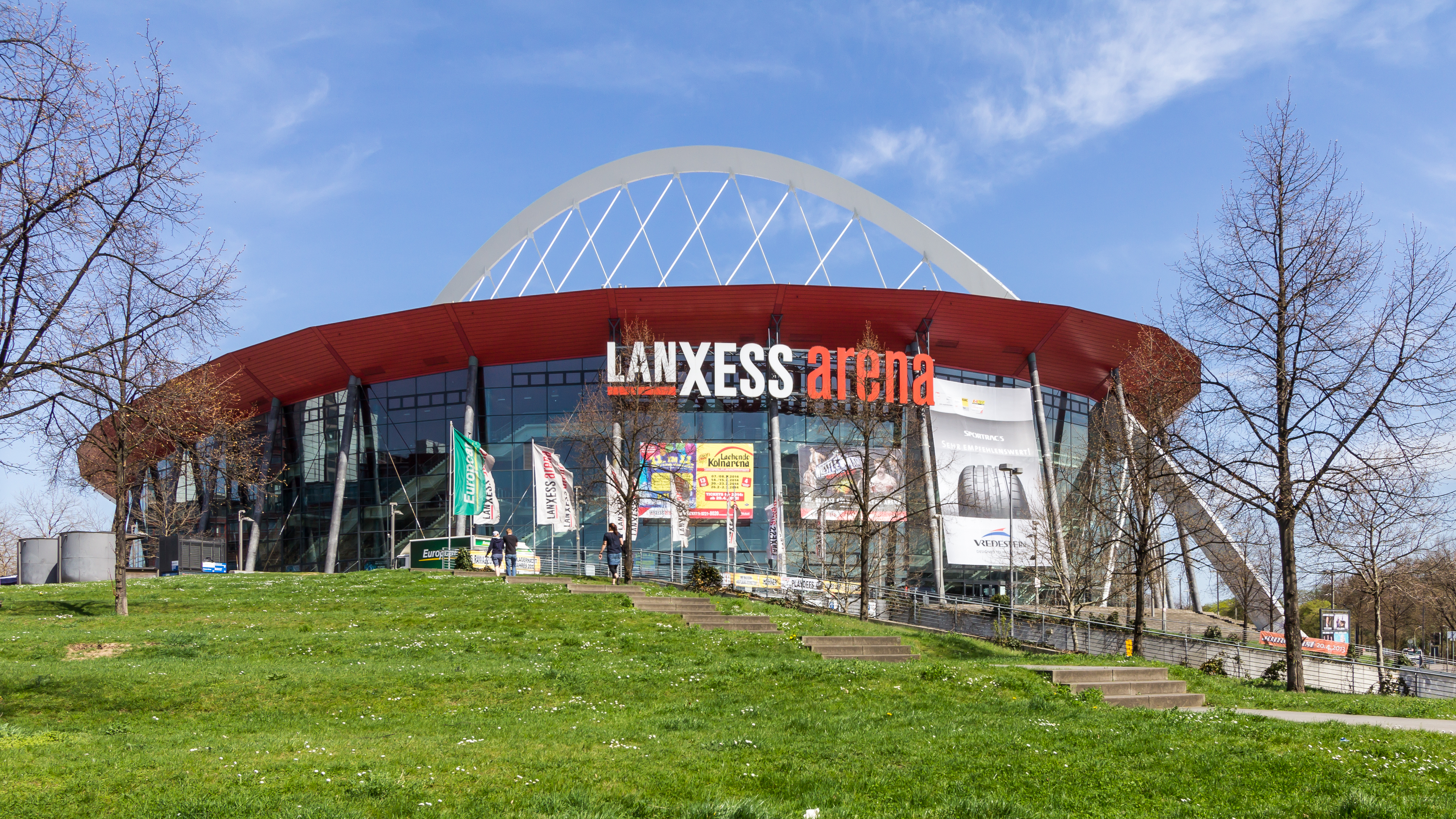
- Interactive map of LANXESS arena
- Former names: Kölnarena (1998–2008)
- Location: Deutz, Cologne, North Rhine-Westphalia, Germany
- Coordinates: 50°56′18.59″N 6°58′58.63″E
- Owner: Immobilienfonds Köln-Deutz Arena, Mantelbebauung GbR
- Operator: Arena Management GmbH
- Capacity: 20,000 (concerts); 19,500 (handball); 18,500 (hockey)
- Surface: Parquetry, ice
- Public transit: Köln Messe/Deutz; Bahnhof Deutz/LANXESS arena

Construction
- Groundbreaking: 31 July 1996
- Opened: 5 October 1998
- Cost: € 153 million
- Architect: Peter Böhm

Tenants
- Kölner Haie (DEL) (1998–present); EHF Champions League (2010–present)

Website
- lanxess-arena.de (in German)

Lanxess Arena (stylized as LANXESS arena; originally Kölnarena, German for "Cologne arena") is an indoor arena, in Cologne, North Rhine-Westphalia, Germany. It is known as the 18,500-capacity home of the Kölner Haie and as one of Germany's major music venues. As of 2019, Lanxess Arena was the highest-attended arena worldwide, with 699,924 tickets sold. The arena is spanned by a notable steel arch supporting the roof via steel cables. The height of the arch is 76 m (249 ft) and its weight is 480 tons.

== History ==
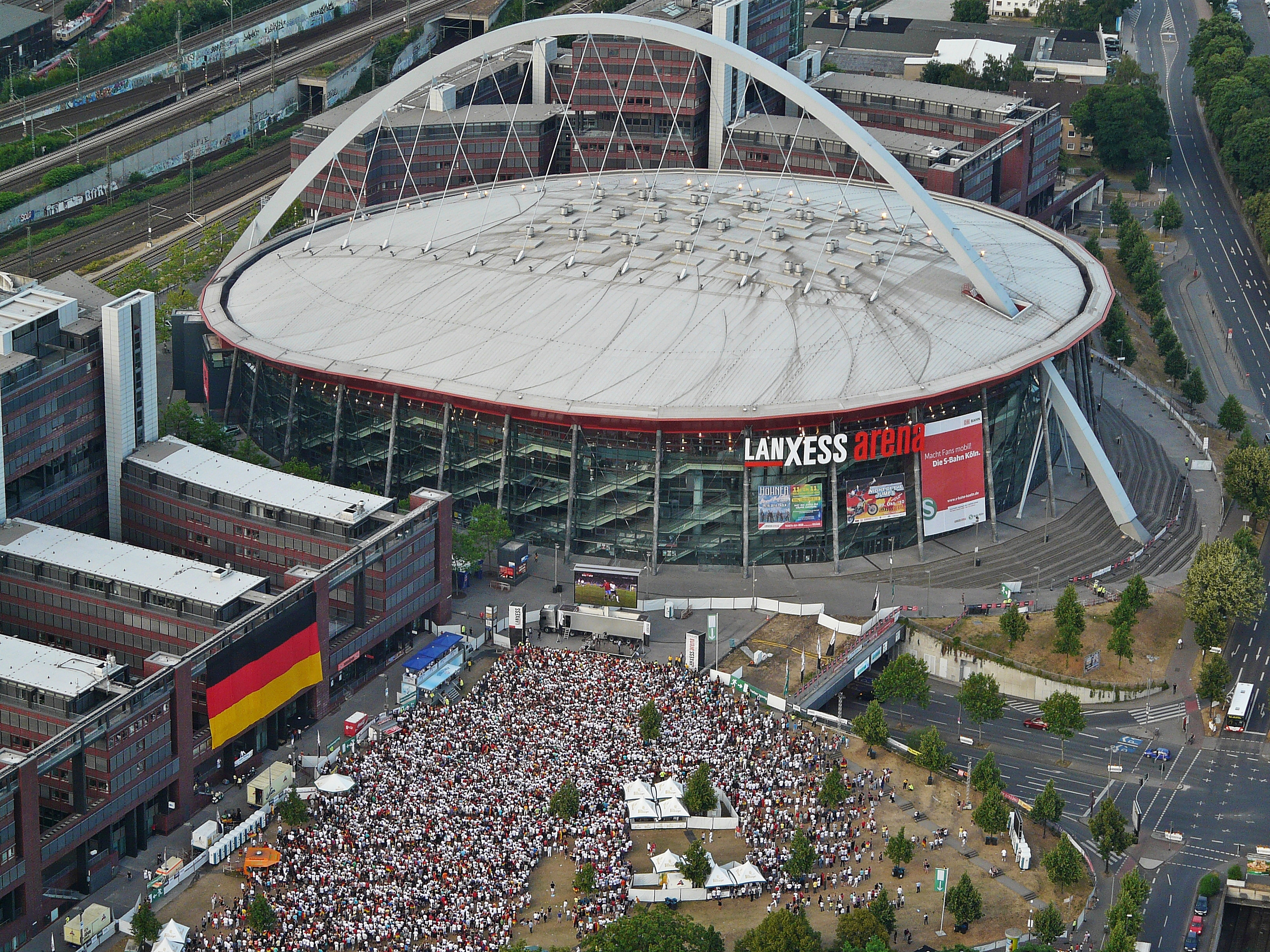
Aerial view

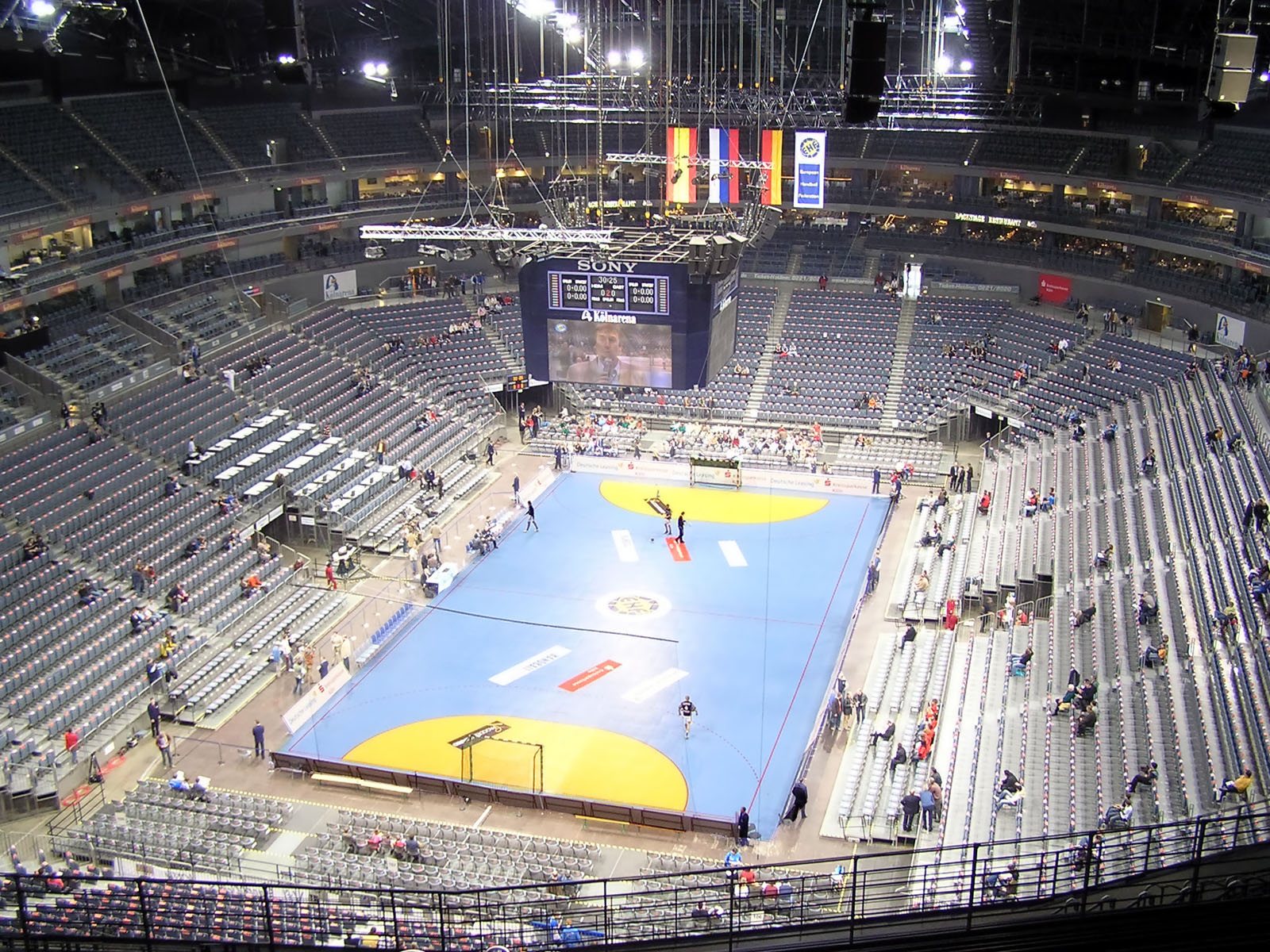
Interior view

On June 2, 2008, it was announced that Kölnarena would be renamed Lanxess Arena, for a period of ten years. The sponsor, Lanxess AG, is a specialty chemicals group based in the Lanxess Tower in Deutz, Cologne. This naming-rights deal was extended in 2017 until December 31, 2023. Then in October 2023, it was announced that the cooperation between the arena and Lanxess had been extended for another 5 years until 2028.

== Events ==
The arena is primarily used by Kölner Haie (ice hockey), VfL Gummersbach (handball), Köln RheinStars (basketball), and as a concert venue. In the world of Counter-Strike esports, the venue is known as "The Cathedral", having played host to the annual Intel Extreme Masters Cologne event since 2015, and three Major Championships held in the arena as of 2026.

=== Concerts ===
Lanxess Arena has been one of the top entertainment venues in Cologne since its opening. Many international artists have performed at the venue, spanning a wide range of music genres. Artists that have performed their concerts at the venue are listed in the table below.

Concerts held at Lanxess Arena
Date	Nationality	Artist	Tour	Opening Act
1998
October 5	United Kingdom	Depeche Mode	The Singles Tour	
October 6	United Kingdom	Depeche Mode	The Singles Tour	
November 19	United Kingdom	Elton John	Big Picture Tour	
December 27	United States	Prince	New Power Soul Tour	
1999
March 8	United States	Kiss	Psycho Circus World Tour	Buckcherry
April 15	United States	Bruce Springsteen; E Street Band	Bruce Springsteen and the E Street Band Reunion Tour	
May 15	Germany	Scorpions	Eye to Eye Tour	
June 7	United States	Backstreet Boys	Into the Millennium Tour	
June 24	United States	Aerosmith	Nine Lives Tour	
September 24	United States	Whitney Houston	My Love Is Your Love World Tour	Amanda Marshall
September 28	United States	Whitney Houston	My Love Is Your Love World Tour	Amanda Marshall
October 19	United States	Cher	Do You Believe?	Belinda Carlisle
2000
February 20	United States	Mariah Carey	Rainbow World Tour	
May 6	Puerto Rico	Ricky Martin	Livin' la Vida Loca Tour	
May 11	United States	Bob Dylan	Never Ending Tour 2000	
June 27	United Kingdom	Elton John	Stately Home Tour	
October 29	Australia	AC/DC	Stiff Upper Lip World Tour	Slash's Snakepit
November 13	United States	Britney Spears	Oops!... I Did It Again Tour	
November 15	Australia	AC/DC	Stiff Upper Lip World Tour	Slash's Snakepit
2001
July 12	Ireland	U2	Elevation Tour	Söhne Mannheims
July 13	Ireland	U2	Elevation Tour	Söhne Mannheims
July 23	United Kingdom	Mark Knopfler	Sailing to Philadelphia Tour	
September 26	United Kingdom	Depeche Mode	Exciter Tour	
September 27	United Kingdom	Depeche Mode	Exciter Tour	
2002
May 18	United Kingdom	Roger Waters	In the Flesh Tour	
May 20	United States	Destiny's Child	Destiny's Child World Tour	Play; Solange Knowles
December 12	Colombia	Shakira	Tour of the Mongoose	
2003
April 27	Ireland	Westlife	Unbreakable Tour	
April 28	Ireland	Westlife	Unbreakable Tour	
April 29	United Kingdom	Paul McCartney	Back in the World Tour	
October 4	United States	Christina Aguilera	The Stripped Tour	
October 31	United Kingdom	David Bowie	A Reality Tour	
November 17	United States	Justin Timberlake	The Justified World Tour	
December 16	United States	Metallica	Madly in Anger with the World Tour	
2004
March 15	United States	Pink	Try This Tour	
March 29	Canada	Shania Twain	Up! Tour	Bjorn Again
May 28	United States	Cher	Living Proof: The Farewell Tour	
November 1	United States	Anastacia	Live at Last Tour	
2005
March 1	United States	Anastacia	Live at Last Tour	
April 5	Australia	Kylie Minogue	Showgirl: The Greatest Hits Tour	Melody Club
May 30	United States	Backstreet Boys	Never Gone Tour	
May 31	United States	Destiny's Child	Destiny Fulfilled... and Lovin' It	
June 6	United Kingdom	Mark Knopfler	Shangri-La Tour	
2006
October 19	United States	Pink	I'm Not Dead Tour	
November 6	United States	Bruce Springsteen; The Sessions	Bruce Springsteen with The Seeger Sessions Band Tour	
November 13	United Kingdom	George Michael	25 Live	
2007
April 8	Colombia	Shakira	Oral Fixation Tour	
April 16	United Kingdom	Roger Waters	The Dark Side of the Moon Live	
June 10	United States	Justin Timberlake	FutureSex/LoveShow	
June 14	United States	Meat Loaf	Seize The Night Tour	
June 27	United States	Aerosmith	2007 World Tour	
September 15	United States	Gwen Stefani	Sweet Escape Tour	CSS
October 29	United Kingdom	Take That	Beautiful World Tour 2007	Sophie Ellis-Bextor
December 13	United States	Bruce Springsteen; E Street Band	Magic Tour	
December 20	United Kingdom	Spice Girls	The Return of the Spice Girls	
2008
May 27	Australia	Kylie Minogue	KylieX2008	
June 18	Canada	Celine Dion	Taking Chances World Tour	Jon Mesek
September 8	Canada	Nickelback	Dark Horse Tour	
September 12	United Kingdom	Coldplay	Viva la Vida Tour	High Wire; Albert Hammond Jr.
2009
January 14	United States	Tina Turner	Tina!: 50th Anniversary Tour	
January 15	United States	Tina Turner	Tina!: 50th Anniversary Tour	
January 18	United States	Tina Turner	Tina!: 50th Anniversary Tour	
January 19	United States	Tina Turner	Tina!: 50th Anniversary Tour	
March 30	United States	Pink	Funhouse Tour	
May 17	United States	Metallica	World Magnetic Tour	Machine Head; The Sword
June 17	United Kingdom	Eagles	Long Road Out of Eden Tour	
July 1	Canada	Leonard Cohen	Leonard Cohen Tour 2008–2010	
October 5	United States	Green Day	21st Century Breakdown World Tour	Prima Donna
October 29	Norway	A-ha	Foot Of The Mountain Tour	
November 16	United Kingdom	Muse	The Resistance Tour	Biffy Clyro
November 28	United Kingdom	Cliff Richard; The Shadow	The Final Reunion Tour	
November 29	Germany	Rammstein	Liebe ist für alle da Tour	
December 16	United Kingdom	Paul McCartney	Good Evening Europe Tour	
December 17	United Kingdom	Paul McCartney	Good Evening Europe Tour	
2010
June 20	United Kingdom	Mark Knopfler	Get Lucky Tour	
September 24	United Kingdom	Sting	Symphonicity Tour	
October 14	Canada	Michael Bublé	Crazy Love Tour	Naturally 7
October 27	United States	Linkin Park	A Thousand Suns World Tour	
November 13	Germany	Scorpions	Get Your Sting and Blackout World Tour	
December 11	Colombia	Shakira	The Sun Comes Out World Tour	
2011
May 21	United Kingdom	Sade	Sade Live	The Jolly Boys
June 21	United States	Eagles	Long Road Out of Eden Tour	
July 28	United States	Prince	Welcome 2	
October 7	United States	Red Hot Chili Peppers	I'm with You World Tour	Femi Kuti & The Positive Force
October 18	United States	Britney Spears	Femme Fatale Tour	Joe Jonas; Destinee & Paris
November 8	Barbados	Rihanna	Loud Tour	
November 29	United States	30 Seconds To Mars	Into the Wild Tour	
December 15	United Kingdom	Coldplay	Mylo Xyloto Tour	Emeli Sandé
2012
April 25	Canada	Michael Bublé	Crazy Love Tour	Naturally 7
July 4	United Kingdom	Snow Patrol	Fallen Empires Tour	
July 10	United States	Madonna	The MDNA Tour	Martin Solveig
September 4	United States	Lady Gaga	Born This Way Ball	The Darkness; Lady Starlight
September 5	United States	Lady Gaga	Born This Way Ball	The Darkness; Lady Starlight
September 21	Canada	Nickelback	Here and Now Tour	
November 15	United Kingdom	Deep Purple	The Songs That Built Rock Tour	
2013
April 6	Canada	Justin Bieber	Believe Tour	
June 5	United States	Alicia Keys	Set the World on Fire World Tour	
June 26	Barbados	Rihanna	Diamonds World Tour	GTA
June 27	Barbados	Rihanna	Diamonds World Tour	GTA
November 21	United Kingdom	Depeche Mode	The Delta Machine Tour	
2014
March 15	United States	Beyoncé	The Mrs. Carter Show World Tour	Monsieur Adi
March 16	United States	Beyoncé	The Mrs. Carter Show World Tour	Monsieur Adi
April 20	United States	Justin Timberlake	The 20/20 Experience World Tour	DJ Freestyle Steve
April 22	United States	Justin Timberlake	The 20/20 Experience World Tour	DJ Freestyle Steve
May 1	Germany	Scorpions	Get Your Sting and Blackout World Tour	
May 2	United Kingdom	Peter Gabriel	Back to Front Tour	
May 26	United States	Miley Cyrus	Bangerz Tour	
October 7	United States	Lady Gaga	ArtRave: The Artpop Ball	Lady Starlight
November 2	Germany	Helene Fischer	Farbenspiel Live	
November 3	Germany	Helene Fischer	Farbenspiel Live	
2015
March 5	United States	Katy Perry	Prismatic World Tour	Charli XCX
June 13	United States	Ariana Grande	The Honeymoon Tour	DJ Dubz
June 19	United States	Taylor Swift	The 1989 World Tour	James Bay
June 20	United States	Taylor Swift	The 1989 World Tour	James Bay
October 4	United Kingdom	Take That	Take That Live 2015	Ella Henderson; Nessi
October 17	Ireland	U2	Innocence + Experience Tour	
October 18	Ireland	U2	Innocence + Experience Tour	
October 20	Argentina	Violetta	Violetta Live International Tour	
November 4	United States	Madonna	Rebel Heart Tour	Mary Mac
November 5	United States	Madonna	Rebel Heart Tour	Mary Mac
2016
April 13	United States	Mariah Carey	Sweet Sweet Fantasy Tour	
April 26	Norway	A-ha	Cast In Steel Tour	
March 6	United Kingdom	Muse	Drones World Tour	Royal Blood
May 14	United Kingdom	Adele	Adele Live 2016	
May 15	United Kingdom	Adele	Adele Live 2016	
June 8	Australia	5 Seconds of Summer	Sounds Live Feels Live World Tour	Don Broco
September 18	Canada	Justin Bieber	Purpose World Tour	Vic Mensa
November 14	United States	Red Hot Chili Peppers	The Getaway World Tour	Deerhoof
November 23	Germany	Scorpions	Get Your Sting and Blackout World Tour	
2017
January 17	United Kingdom	Black Sabbath	The End Tour	Rival Sons
February 15	United States	Kings of Leon	WALLS Tour	
March 2	Canada	The Weeknd	Starboy: Legend of the Fall Tour	Lil Uzi Vert; Bryson Tiller
March 16	Canada	Drake	Boy Meets World Tour	
March 23	United Kingdom	Ed Sheeran	÷ Tour	Anne-Marie; Ryan McMullan
April 10	United States	Bruno Mars	24K Magic World Tour	Anderson Paak
June 11	United Kingdom	Phil Collins	Not Dead Yet Tour	
June 12	United Kingdom	Phil Collins	Not Dead Yet Tour	
June 14	United Kingdom	Phil Collins	Not Dead Yet Tour	
June 15	United Kingdom	Phil Collins	Not Dead Yet Tour	
June 16	United Kingdom	Phil Collins	Not Dead Yet Tour	
September 14	United States	Metallica	WorldWired Tour	Kvelertak
September 16	United States	Metallica	WorldWired Tour	Kvelertak
October 3	Germany	Helene Fischer	Helene Fischer Live 2017/2018	
October 4	Germany	Helene Fischer	Helene Fischer Live 2017/2018	
October 6	Germany	Helene Fischer	Helene Fischer Live 2017/2018	
October 7	Germany	Helene Fischer	Helene Fischer Live 2017/2018	
October 8	Germany	Helene Fischer	Helene Fischer Live 2017/2018	
2018
January 15	United Kingdom	Depeche Mode	Global Spirit Tour	The Horrors
January 23	Germany	Helene Fischer	Helene Fischer Live 2017/2018	
January 24	Germany	Helene Fischer	Helene Fischer Live 2017/2018	
February 22	United States	Kendrick Lamar	The Damn Tour	James Blake
March 24	Argentina	Soy Luna	Soy Luna Live	
April 28	United Kingdom	Sam Smith	The Thrill of It All Tour	
May 23	United States	Katy Perry	Witness: The Tour	Tove Styrke
June 5	Colombia	Shakira	El Dorado World Tour	Salva
June 6	United States	Demi Lovato	Tell Me You Love Me World Tour	Joy
July 21	United States	Justin Timberlake	The Man of the Woods Tour	The Shadowboxers
July 22	United States	Justin Timberlake	The Man of the Woods Tour	The Shadowboxers
September 4	Ireland	U2	Experience + Innocence Tour	
September 5	Ireland	U2	Experience + Innocence Tour	
October 8	Canada	Shania Twain	Shania Now Tour	Bastian Baker
December 4	Japan	Hatsune Miku	Hatsune Miku Expo 2018 Europe	
2019
March 18	Canada	Shawn Mendes	Shawn Mendes: The Tour	Alessia Cara
March 23	Trinidad and Tobago	Nicki Minaj	The Nicki Wrld Tour	Zuna & Azet; Miami Yacine; Juice WRLD
September 1	United States	Ariana Grande	Sweetener World Tour	Ella Mai; Social House
September 23	United Kingdom	Little Mix	LM5 The Tour	Keelie Walker
October 5	United States	Cher	Here We Go Again Tour	Bright Light Bright Light; KidCutUp
2020
February 11	United States	Jonas Brothers	Happiness Begins Tour	Jordan McGraw; Picture This
2022
May 12	United Kingdom	Dua Lipa	Future Nostalgia Tour	Griff
May 15	Norway	A-ha	Hunting High and Low Tour	
July 8	United States	Alicia Keys	Alicia the World Tour	
July 22	United Kingdom	Harry Styles	Love on Tour	Wolf Alice
December 8	South Korea	Blackpink	Born Pink World Tour	
2023
February 5	United Kingdom	Robbie Williams	XXV Tour	
February 6	United Kingdom	Robbie Williams	XXV Tour	
February 8	United Kingdom	Robbie Williams	XXV Tour	
2024
March 19	Canada	Celine Dion	Courage World Tour	
May 22	United States	Jonas Brothers	Five Albums. One Night. The World Tour	
June 4	Trinidad and Tobago	Nicki Minaj	Pink Friday 2 World Tour	
June 5	Trinidad and Tobago	Nicki Minaj	Pink Friday 2 World Tour	
June 11	Colombia	Karol G	Mañana será bonito Tour	
June 12	United States	Olivia Rodrigo	Guts World Tour	Remi Wolf
June 14	Albania	Elvana Gjata	Dekada	
July 11	United States	Megan Thee Stallion	Hot Girl Summer Tour	
August 25	United States	Justin Timberlake	The Forget Tomorrow World Tour	
August 26	United States	Justin Timberlake	The Forget Tomorrow World Tour	
October 6	United States	Janet Jackson	Janet Jackson: Together Again	Wyclef Jean
October 12	Serbia	Aleksandra Prijović	Od Istoka Do Zapada Tour	

=== Sports and computer gaming ===
- The arena was used for the 2007 World Men's Handball Championship, including the third place game and the final game.
- On June 13, 2009, the Ultimate Fighting Championships held UFC 99 at the Lanxess Arena. This was the first time the UFC had made its way to Germany.
- From 2010, the arena host the handball EHF Champions League Final Four.
- The arena was one of the venues for the 2010 IIHF World Championship, including both semi-finals, the Bronze medal game and the Championship game.
- From August 22–23, 2015, the arena hosted ESL One Cologne 2015, one of three major Counter-Strike: Global Offensive tournaments to be held throughout 2015.
- From July 5–10, 2016, the arena hosted ESL One Cologne 2016, the second $1,000,000 Counter-Strike: Global Offensive Major tournament and the second held at the arena.
- From May 5–21, 2017, the arena co-hosted the IIHF ice hockey world championship, including all the final games.
- From July 7–9, 2017, the arena hosted ESL One Cologne 2017, a Counter-Strike: Global Offensive tournament with a prize pool of $250,000.
- From July 6–8, 2018, the arena hosted ESL One Cologne 2018. This event earned Lanxess Arena the nickname “The Cathedral Of Counter-Strike”.
- On October 8, 2018, the arena hosted an exhibition ice hockey game between Kölner Haie and the Edmonton Oilers, part of the 2018 NHL Global Series Challenge.
- From July 5–7, 2019, the arena hosted another edition of the ESL One Cologne, a Counter-Strike: Global Offensive tournament with a prize pool of $300,000.
- From July 12–13, 2019, the arena hosted the 2019 German Darts Masters, part of the Professional Darts Corporation World Series.
- From May 22–24, 2020, the arena hosted the 2020 Euroleague Final Four, part of Euroleague Basketball.
- In 2020 the arena hosted back-to-back ATP 250 events: from October 11–18, Bett1Hulks Indoors, and from October 17–25, Bett1Hulks Championship.
- From 15–17 July, 2022, Counter-Strike: Global Offensive returned to the arena after a two–year hiatus caused by the COVID-19 pandemic, under the moniker IEM Cologne 2022, as ESL merged their ESL One brand into their Intel Extreme Masters brand. The event offered an increased prize pool of $1,000,000.
- The venue hosted some group phase matches at the FIBA EuroBasket 2022 which Germany hosted. It cohosted with the fellow German city of Berlin, Czech Republic in Prague, Georgia in Tbilisi and Italy in Milan.
- The annual Counter-Strike: Global Offensive event, IEM Cologne 2023, returned to the venue from 4–6 August, 2023, when the prize pool offered was once again $1,000,000, matching that of the previous year. The winners, G2 Esports, took first place and $400,000.
- On 1 September 2024, the arena would play host to the opening matchday of The Icon League, a German five-a-side football format with unique rules.
- On 3 August 2025, after the IEM Cologne 2025 Counter-Strike 2 tournament won by Team Spirit, ESL announced that Cologne would play host to the IEM Cologne Major 2026 from 18–21 June, 2026, the third Major to be held at the arena and the fourth in Cologne overall. Team Falcons would win the Major, defeating FURIA 3–0.

== See also ==
- List of indoor arenas in Germany
- List of European ice hockey arenas
- List of indoor arenas by capacity

== Notes ==
Preceded by Salle Omnisport de Radès; Radès	World Men's Handball Championship; Final Venue; 2007	Succeeded by Arena Zagreb; Zagreb

Preceded by New Budapest Arena; Budapest	European Men's Handball Championship; Final Venue; 2024	Succeeded by TBA; TBA
