= Helene Fischer Live 2017/2018 =

2017–18 concert tour by Helene Fischer

- Tour by Helene Fischer
- Associated album: Helene Fischer
- Start date: 12 September 2017
- End date: 15 September 2018
- Legs: 4
- No. of shows: 86

Helene Fischer concert chronology
- Farbenspiel Live (2014-15); Helene Fischer Live 2017/2018 (2017-18)

The Helene Fischer Live 2017/2018 is a European concert tour by German singer Helene Fischer. It began on 12 September 2017, in Hannover, Germany at the TUI Arena and continued throughout Europe, finally concluding on 15 September 2018 in Arnhem at GelreDome.

The tour visited arenas throughout 2017 and 2018. According to reports, ticket sales had up to 500,000 after only just a few days on sale. For the summer of 2018, a stadium tour was also announced with 14 concerts in Europe, which will be her biggest tour to date.

According to Forbes, Fischer, who is mostly unknown outside from German speaking Europe, earned from June 2017 to June 2018 over $30,000,000 and placed at No.8 on the list, earning more than Britney Spears and Celine Dion.

The Arena Tour is created in collaboration with 45 Degrees. and with Stufish Entertainment Architects The Stadium-Tour "Spürst Du Das" is created with Stufish Entertainment Architects.

== Set list ==
2017/2018 - Die Arena-Tournee

This setlist was obtained from the concert of 12 September 2017 held at TUI Arena in Hannover. It may not represent all shows throughout the tour.

1. "Intro"
2. "Nur mit Dir"
3. "Phänomen"
4. "Das volle Programm"
5. "Schmetterling"
6. "Weil Liebe nie zerbricht"
7. "Mit keinem Andern"
8. "Ich will immer wieder... dieses Fieber spür'n"
9. "Sowieso"
10. "Und morgen früh küss ich dich wach"
11. "Die schönste Reise"
12. "Ich wollte mich nie mehr verlieben"
13. "Wenn Du lachst"
14. "Hit Medley" (Hundert Prozent / Du fängst mich auf und lässt mich fliegen / Von hier bis Unendlich / Die Hölle morgen früh)
15. "Lieb mich dann"
16. "Du hast mich stark gemacht"
17. "Mit jedem Herzschlag"
18. "Herzbeben"
19. "Dein Blick"
20. "Mit dem Wind"
21. "Wir Zwei"
22. "Fehlerfrei"
23. "Wir brechen das Schweigen"
24. "Achterbahn" (Afrojack Mash Up)
25. "Flieger"

Encore

25. "Unser Tag"
26. "Atemlos durch die Nacht"
2018 - Die Stadion-Tournee

This setlist was obtained from the concert of 23 June 2018 held at Red Bull Arena (Leipzig) in Leipzig. It may not represent all shows throughout the tour.

1. "Intro"
2. "Flieger"
3. "Phänomen"
4. "Fehlerfrei"
5. "Hit Medley" (Feuerwerk / Mitten im Paradies / Hundert Prozent)
6. "Viva la vida / Sonne auf der Haut"
7. "Und morgen früh küss' ich dich wach"
8. "Lieb' Mich"
9. "Von hier bis unendlich"
10. "Verdammt, ich lieb’ Dich" (Matthias Reim cover)
11. "90's Medley" (Rhythm Is a Dancer / What is Love / I Like to Move It)
12. "Mit dem Wind"
13. "Unser Tag"
14. "Freiheit" (Westernhagen cover)
15. "Wir brechen das Schweigen"
16. "Atemlos durch die Nacht"
17. "Sowieso"
18. "Ich will immer wieder... dieses Fieber spür'n"
19. "Die Hölle morgen früh"
20. "Herzbeben"
21. "Mit keinem Andern"
22. "Nur mit Dir" (Acoustic)

Encore

23. "Achterbahn" (Afrojack Mash Up)

== Shows ==
List of concerts, showing date, city, country, venue, opening act, tickets sold, number of available tickets and amount of gross revenue
Date	City	Country	Venue	Attendance	Revenue
Europe — Leg 1
12 September 2017	Hannover	Germany	TUI Arena	—	—
13 September 2017	Hannover	Germany	TUI Arena	—	—
15 September 2017	Hannover	Germany	TUI Arena	—	—
16 September 2017	Hannover	Germany	TUI Arena	—	—
17 September 2017	Hannover	Germany	TUI Arena	—	—
19 September 2017	Hamburg	Germany	Barclays Arena	55,694 / 69,450	$4,794,770
20 September 2017	Hamburg	Germany	Barclays Arena	55,694 / 69,450	$4,794,770
22 September 2017	Hamburg	Germany	Barclays Arena	55,694 / 69,450	$4,794,770
23 September 2017	Hamburg	Germany	Barclays Arena	55,694 / 69,450	$4,794,770
24 September 2017	Hamburg	Germany	Barclays Arena	55,694 / 69,450	$4,794,770
26 September 2017	Dortmund	Germany	Westfalenhallen	—	—
27 September 2017	Dortmund	Germany	Westfalenhallen	—	—
29 September 2017	Dortmund	Germany	Westfalenhallen	—	—
30 September 2017	Dortmund	Germany	Westfalenhallen	—	—
1 October 2017	Dortmund	Germany	Westfalenhallen	—	—
3 October 2017	Cologne	Germany	Lanxess Arena	—	—
4 October 2017	Cologne	Germany	Lanxess Arena	—	—
6 October 2017	Cologne	Germany	Lanxess Arena	—	—
7 October 2017	Cologne	Germany	Lanxess Arena	—	—
8 October 2017	Cologne	Germany	Lanxess Arena	—	—
10 October 2017	Leipzig	Germany	Arena Leipzig	—	—
11 October 2017	Leipzig	Germany	Arena Leipzig	—	—
13 October 2017	Leipzig	Germany	Arena Leipzig	—	—
14 October 2017	Leipzig	Germany	Arena Leipzig	—	—
15 October 2017	Leipzig	Germany	Arena Leipzig	—	—
17 October 2017	Mannheim	Germany	SAP Arena	—	—
18 October 2017	Mannheim	Germany	SAP Arena	—	—
20 October 2017	Mannheim	Germany	SAP Arena	—	—
21 October 2017	Mannheim	Germany	SAP Arena	—	—
22 October 2017	Mannheim	Germany	SAP Arena	—	—
24 October 2017	Zürich	Switzerland	Hallenstadion	—	—
25 October 2017	Zürich	Switzerland	Hallenstadion	—	—
27 October 2017	Zürich	Switzerland	Hallenstadion	—	—
28 October 2017	Zürich	Switzerland	Hallenstadion	—	—
29 October 2017	Zürich	Switzerland	Hallenstadion	—	—
Europe — Leg 2
16 January 2018	Frankfurt	Germany	Festhalle Frankfurt	—	—
17 January 2018	Frankfurt	Germany	Festhalle Frankfurt	—	—
19 January 2018	Frankfurt	Germany	Festhalle Frankfurt	—	—
20 January 2018	Frankfurt	Germany	Festhalle Frankfurt	—	—
21 January 2018	Frankfurt	Germany	Festhalle Frankfurt	—	—
23 January 2018	Cologne	Germany	Lanxess Arena	—	—
24 January 2018	Cologne	Germany	Lanxess Arena	—	—
27 January 2018	Bremen	Germany	ÖVB Arena	—	—
28 January 2018	Bremen	Germany	ÖVB Arena	—	—
30 January 2018	Stuttgart	Germany	Hanns-Martin-Schleyer-Halle	50,000 / 50,000	—
31 January 2018	Stuttgart	Germany	Hanns-Martin-Schleyer-Halle	50,000 / 50,000	—
2 February 2018	Stuttgart	Germany	Hanns-Martin-Schleyer-Halle	50,000 / 50,000	—
3 February 2018	Stuttgart	Germany	Hanns-Martin-Schleyer-Halle	50,000 / 50,000	—
4 February 2018	Stuttgart	Germany	Hanns-Martin-Schleyer-Halle	50,000 / 50,000	—
~~6 February 2018~~	Berlin	Germany	Mercedes-Benz Arena	—	—
~~7 February 2018~~	Berlin	Germany	Mercedes-Benz Arena	—	—
~~9 February 2018~~	Berlin	Germany	Mercedes-Benz Arena	—	—
~~10 February 2018~~	Berlin	Germany	Mercedes-Benz Arena	—	—
~~11 February 2018~~	Berlin	Germany	Mercedes-Benz Arena	—	—
~~13 February 2018~~	Vienna	Austria	Wiener Stadthalle	—	—
~~14 February 2018~~	Vienna	Austria	Wiener Stadthalle	—	—
16 February 2018	Vienna	Austria	Wiener Stadthalle	—	—
17 February 2018	Vienna	Austria	Wiener Stadthalle	—	—
18 February 2018	Vienna	Austria	Wiener Stadthalle	—	—
20 February 2018	Oberhausen	Germany	König Pilsener Arena	—	—
21 February 2018	Oberhausen	Germany	König Pilsener Arena	—	—
23 February 2018	Oberhausen	Germany	König Pilsener Arena	—	—
24 February 2018	Oberhausen	Germany	König Pilsener Arena	—	—
25 February 2018	Oberhausen	Germany	König Pilsener Arena	—	—
27 February 2018	Munich	Germany	Olympiahalle	—	—
28 February 2018	Munich	Germany	Olympiahalle	—	—
2 March 2018	Munich	Germany	Olympiahalle	—	—
3 March 2018	Munich	Germany	Olympiahalle	—	—
4 March 2018	Munich	Germany	Olympiahalle	—	—
Open Air — Leg 3
23 June 2018	Leipzig	Germany	Red Bull Arena	80,000 / 80,000	
24 June 2018	Leipzig	Germany	Red Bull Arena	80,000 / 80,000	
26 June 2018	Basel	Switzerland	St. Jakob-Park	—	—
29 June 2018	Munich	Germany	Olympiastadion	—	—
1 July 2018	Nuremberg	Germany	Stadion Nürnberg	—	—
3 July 2018	Gelsenkirchen	Germany	Veltins-Arena	—	—
6 July 2018	Düsseldorf	Germany	Esprit Arena	—	—
8 July 2018	Berlin	Germany	Olympiastadion	58,000	—
11 July 2018	Vienna	Austria	Ernst-Happel-Stadion	40,000	—
14 July 2018	Hamburg	Germany	Volksparkstadion	82,000	—
15 July 2018	Hamburg	Germany	Volksparkstadion	82,000	—
17 July 2018	Hannover	Germany	HDI-Arena	40,000	—
20 July 2018	Frankfurt	Germany	Commerzbank-Arena	45,000	—
22 July 2018	Stuttgart	Germany	Mercedes-Benz Arena	45,000	—
Europe- Leg 4
1 September 2018	Mannheim	Germany	SAP Arena		
2 September 2018	Mannheim	Germany	SAP Arena		
4 September 2018	Berlin	Germany	Mercedes-Benz Arena	59,450 / 59,450	$5,251,970
5 September 2018	Berlin	Germany	Mercedes-Benz Arena	59,450 / 59,450	$5,251,970
7 September 2018	Berlin	Germany	Mercedes-Benz Arena	59,450 / 59,450	$5,251,970
8 September 2018	Berlin	Germany	Mercedes-Benz Arena	59,450 / 59,450	$5,251,970
9 September 2018	Berlin	Germany	Mercedes-Benz Arena	59,450 / 59,450	$5,251,970
11 September 2018	Vienna	Austria	Wiener Stadhalle		
12 September 2018	Vienna	Austria	Wiener Stadhalle		
15 September 2018	Arnhem	Netherlands	GelreDome		
Total				1.300.000	—
