= An Evening with Elton John =

1999 concert tour by Elton John

- Tour by Elton John
- Poster to the concert in Illinois, USA
- Location: Europe • North America
- Start date: 19 February 1999
- End date: 20 November 1999
- Legs: 5
- No. of shows: 51 in total

Elton John concert chronology
- Face to Face 1998 (1998); An Evening with Elton John (1999); Medusa Tour (1999–2000)

An Evening with Elton John was a 1999 solo concert tour by Elton John.

After returning to full-time touring in 1997 John had focused his attention on touring with his band and touring with Billy Joel. This was the first time since returning to touring that John had performed a solo concert.

The tour started on 19 February 1999 in Roanoke, Virginia and ended on 20 November 1999 in Vancouver, British Columbia.

== Tour dates ==
Date	City	Country	Venue
North America (first leg)
19 February 1999	Roanoke	United States	Roanoke Civic Center
20 February 1999	Chattanooga	United States	UTC Arena
23 February 1999	Atlanta	United States	Fox Theatre
26 February 1999	Fort Myers	United States	TECO Arena
27 February 1999	Gainesville	United States	O'Connell Center
2 March 1999	Peoria	United States	Peoria Civic Center
5 March 1999	Grand Rapids	United States	Van Andel Arena
6 March 1999	Iowa City	United States	Carver–Hawkeye Arena
9 March 1999	Nashville	United States	Nashville Arena
10 March 1999	Carbondale	United States	SIU Arena
12 March 1999	Orlando	United States	Hard Rock Live
13 March 1999	Pensacola	United States	Pensacola Civic Center
16 March 1999	Jackson	United States	Mississippi Coliseum
17 March 1999	Lafayette	United States	Cajundome
19 March 1999	Huntsville	United States	Von Braun Center
North America (second leg)
21 May 1999	Bakersfield	United States	Centennial Garden
22 May 1999	Fresno	United States	Selland Arena
25 May 1999	Portland	United States	Rose Garden
27 May 1999	Seattle	United States	KeyArena
29 May 1999	Spokane	United States	Spokane Arena
30 May 1999	Boise	United States	BSU Pavilion
1 June 1999	Laramie	United States	Arena-Auditorium
4 June 1999	Kansas City	United States	Kemper Arena
5 June 1999	Maryland Heights	United States	Riverport Amphitheatre
6 June 1999	Mansfield	United States	Tweeter Center
8 June 1999	Fort Wayne	United States	War Memorial Coliseum
9 June 1999	Fairborn	United States	Nutter Center
11 June 1999	Burgettstown	United States	Star Lake Amphitheater
12 June 1999	Cuyahoga Falls	United States	Blossom Music Center
15 June 1999	Hamilton	Canada	Copps Coliseum
16 June 1999	Rochester	United States	Blue Cross Arena
18 June 1999	Baltimore	United States	Baltimore Arena
19 June 1999	Providence	United States	Providence Civic Center
Europe (first leg)
25 June 1999	Ludwigslust	Germany	Schlossberg
26 June 1999	Halle	Germany	Gerry Weber Stadion
29 June 1999	Dresden	Germany	Theaterplatz
2 July 1999	Lucca	Italy	Piazza Napoleone
Europe (second leg)
29 August 1999	Leeds	England	Harewood House
30 August 1999	Leeds	England	Harewood House
1 September 1999	Pontevedra	Spain	Plaza De Toros
4 September 1999	Kent	England	Leeds Castle
5 September 1999	Kent	England	Leeds Castle
6 September 1999	Kent	England	Leeds Castle
North America (third leg)
5 October 1999	Asheville	United States	Asheville Civic Center
12 October 1999	Boston	United States	FleetCenter
15 October 1999	New York City	United States	Madison Square Garden
16 October 1999	New York City	United States	Madison Square Garden
5 November 1999	Madison	United States	Kohl Center
12 November 1999	Chicago	United States	Arie Crown Theater
13 November 1999	South Bend	United States	Joyce Center
15 November 1999	Winnipeg	Canada	Winnipeg Arena
17 November 1999	Calgary	Canada	Canadian Airlines Saddledome
18 November 1999	Edmonton	Canada	Skyreach Centre
20 November 1999	Vancouver	Canada	General Motors Place

== Setlists ==
Standard Early North American setlist
1. Your Song
2. Skyline Pigeon
3. The Greatest Discovery
4. Border Song
5. Talking Old Soldiers
6. Daniel
7. Honky Cat
8. Come Down in Time
9. Sacrifice
10. Better Off Dead
11. I Guess That's Why They Call It the Blues
12. Ticking
13. Carla/Etude
14. Tonight
15. I Don't Wanna Go On with You Like That
16. The One
17. Written in the Stars
18. Mona Lisas and Mad Hatters
19. Take Me to the Pilot
20. Friends
21. Recover Your Soul
22. I Only Want to Be with You
23. Sorry Seems to Be the Hardest Word
24. Blue Eyes
25. Levon
26. Crocodile Rock
27. Don't Let the Sun Go Down on Me
28. Circle of Life
29. Bennie and the Jets
30. The Last Song
Standard Early European setlist
1. Your Song
2. Skyline Pigeon
3. The Greatest Discovery
4. Border Song
5. Live Like Horses
6. Daniel
7. Honky Cat
8. Rocket Man
9. Sacrifice
10. Better Off Dead
11. House
12. I Guess That's Why They Call It the Blues
13. Ticking
14. Carla/Etude
15. Tonight
16. I Don't Want to Go On with You Like That
17. The One
18. Blue Eyes
19. Mona Lisa and Mad Hatters
20. Take Me to the Pilot
21. Crocodile Rock
22. Don't Let the Sun Go Down on Me
23. Circle of Life
24. Bennie and the Jets
25. Candle In The Wind
Standard North American setlist
1. Your Song
2. Skyline Pigeon
3. The Greatest Discovery
4. Border Song
5. Harmony
6. Daniel
7. Honky Cat
8. Rocket Man
9. Tiny Dancer
10. Better Off Dead
11. Philadelphia Freedom
12. Elton's Song
13. Sweet Painted Lady
14. I Guess That's Why They Call It the Blues
15. Ticking
16. Carla/Etude
17. Tonight
18. Burn Down the Mission
19. The One
20. Blue Eyes
21. Empty Garden (Hey Hey Johnny)
22. Take Me to the Pilot
23. Sorry Seems to Be the Hardest Word
24. Crocodile Rock
25. Don't Let the Sun Go Down on Me
26. Bennie and the Jets
27. Candle in the Wind
Standard European setlist
1. Your Song
2. Skyline Pigeon
3. The Greatest Discovery
4. Talking Old Soldiers
5. Border Song
6. Daniel
7. Honky Cat
8. Rocket Man
9. Sacrifice
10. Better Off Dead
11. House
12. I Guess That's Why They Call It the Blues
13. Ticking
14. Carla/Etude
15. Tonight
16. I Don't Want to Go On with You Like That
17. The One
18. Blue Eyes
19. Song For Guy
20. Take Me to the Pilot
21. Sorry Seems to Be the Hardest Word
22. Crocodile Rock
23. Don't Let the Sun Go Down on Me
24. Circle of Life
25. Bennie and the Jets
26. Candle In The Wind
