= Farbenspiel Live =

2014–15 concert tour by Helene Fischer

- Tour by Helene Fischer
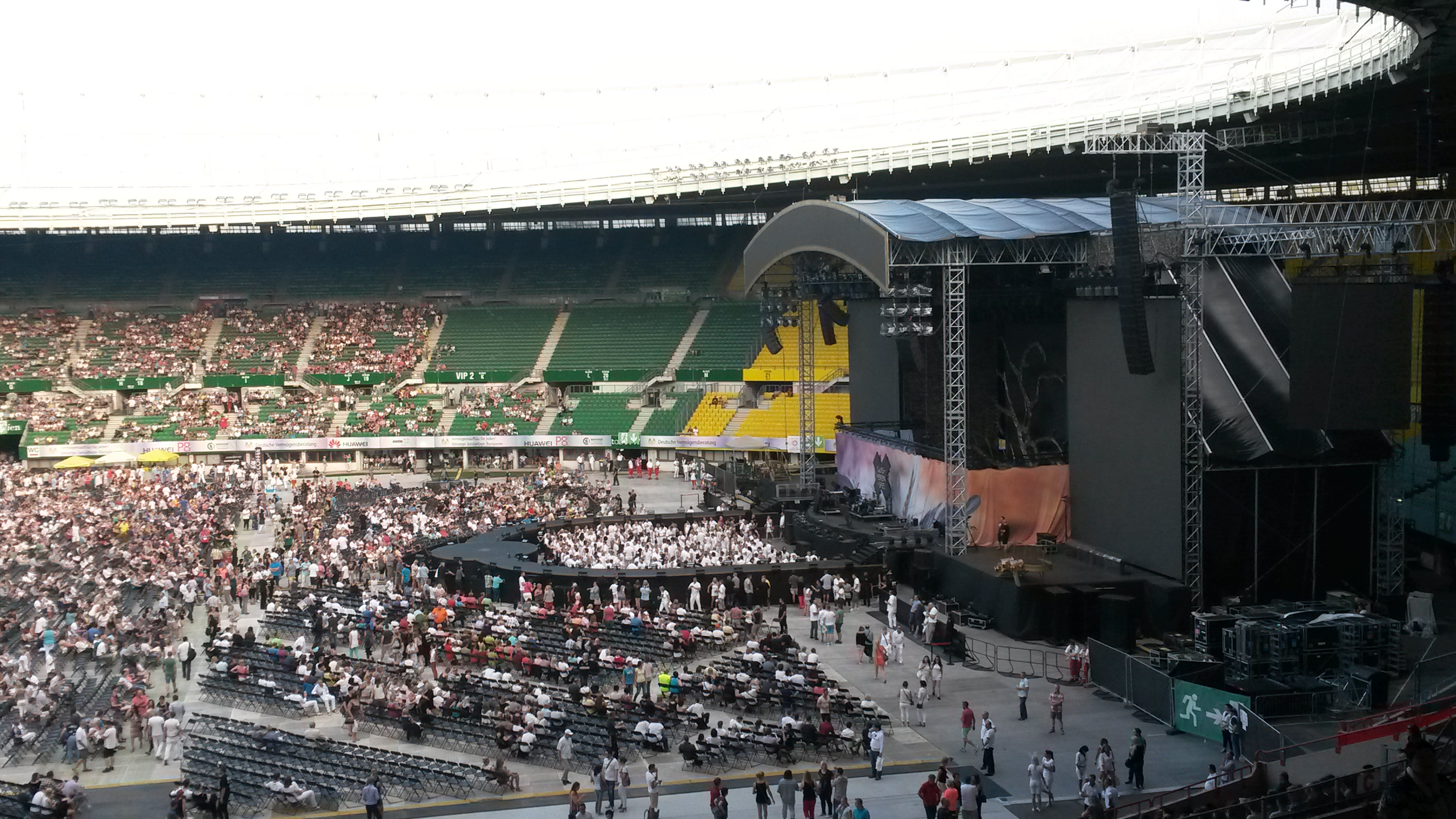
- Helene Fischer Wien 2015
- Associated album: Farbenspiel
- Start date: 25 September 2014
- End date: 8 July 2015
- Legs: 2
- No. of shows: 52 in Europe

Helene Fischer concert chronology
- Farbenspiel Live (2014-15); Helene Fischer Live 2017/2018 (2017-18)

Farbenspiel Live was a European concert tour by German singer Helene Fischer, in support of her sixth studio album, Farbenspiel. It began on 25 September 2014, in Riesa, Germany at the Erdgas Arena, continued throughout Europe, and finally concluded on 8 July 2015 in Dresden at Glücksgas Stadium. The tour visited arenas and stadiums throughout 2014 and 2015. The concerts in Berlin in July 2015 were recorded for an Official Live DVD which was released on 4 September 2015. The 2015 part of the Tour was ranked as the 38th biggest International Tour of the year with earnings of about $42,000,000. Fischer is also the most successful German Act on the list for the second year in a row.

== Set list ==
2014 - Die Tournee

This set list is representative of the performance in Frankfurt. It does not represent all concerts for the duration of the 2014 tour.

1. "Intro"
2. "Unser Tag"
3. "Und morgen früh küss' ich dich wach"
4. "Fehlerfrei"
5. "Mitten im Paradies"
6. "In diesen Nächten"
7. "Wunder dich nicht"
8. "Nur wer den Wahnsinn liebt"
9. "Interlude Winter"
10. "Lass jetzt los (Let it Go)"
11. "Vergeben, vergessen und wieder vertrau'n"
12. "Bring Me to Life" (Evanescence cover)
13. "Feuerwerk"
14. "Rock Medley" (You're the Voice / I Love Rock 'n' Roll / Jump / Livin' on a Prayer / Purple Rain)
15. "Mit keinem Andern"
16. "Interlude Frühling"
17. "Der Augenblick"
18. "Caruso" (Lucio Dalla cover)
19. "Ein kleines Glück"
20. "Interlude Sommer"
21. "Marathon"
22. "Ich habe Fieber / Fever" (Peggy Lee cover)
23. "Ich will immer wieder dieses Fieber spüren"
24. "Te quiero"
25. "Fly" (Céline Dion cover)
26. "My Heart Will Go On" (Céline Dion cover)
27. "Von hier bis unendlich"
28. "Die Hölle morgen früh"

Encore

29. "Phänomen"
30. "Atemlos durch die Nacht"
2015 - Die Stadion-Tournee

This set list is representative of the performance in Hamburg. It does not represent all concerts for the duration of the 2015 tour.

1. "Intro"
2. "Unser Tag"
3. "Und morgen früh küss' ich dich wach"
4. "Fehlerfrei"
5. "Mitten im Paradies"
6. "Wunder dich nicht"
7. "Marathon"
8. "Te quiero"
9. "Interlude Winter"
10. "Ich wollte nie erwachsen sein (Nessaja's Lied)" (Peter Maffay cover)
11. "Vergeben, vergessen und wieder vertrau'n"
12. "Feuerwerk"
13. "Party Medley" (Party Rock Anthem / Seven Nation Army / Sexy / Männer / Sex on fire / The Best)
14. "Mit keinem Andern"
15. "Interlude Sommer"
16. "So kann das Leben sein"
17. "Everything I Do" (Bryan Adams cover)
18. "Ich habe Fieber / Fever" (Peggy Lee cover)
19. "Ich will immer wieder dieses Fieber spüren"
20. "Von hier bis unendlich"
21. "Ein kleines Glück"
22. "The Rose" (Bette Midler cover)
23. "Hundert Prozent"
24. "Die Hölle morgen früh"

Encore

25. "Phänomen"
26. "Atemlos durch die Nacht"

== Shows ==
List of concerts, showing date, city, country, venue, tickets sold, number of available tickets and amount of gross revenue
Date	City	Country	Venue	Attendance	Revenue
Leg 1 — Europe
25 September 2014	Riesa	Germany	Erdgas Arena	—	—
27 September 2014	Frankfurt	Germany	Festhalle Frankfurt	—	—
28 September 2014	Frankfurt	Germany	Festhalle Frankfurt	—	—
30 September 2014	Oberhausen	Germany	König Pilsener Arena	—	—
1 October 2014	Oberhausen	Germany	König Pilsener Arena	—	—
3 October 2014	Bremen	Germany	ÖVB Arena	—	—
4 October 2014	Bremen	Germany	ÖVB Arena	—	—
6 October 2014	Leipzig	Germany	Arena Leipzig	—	—
7 October 2014	Leipzig	Germany	Arena Leipzig	—	—
9 October 2014	Hanover	Germany	TUI Arena	—	—
10 October 2014	Hanover	Germany	TUI Arena	—	—
21 October 2014	Zürich	Switzerland	Hallenstadion	21,000 / 21,000	$2,501,450
22 October 2014	Zürich	Switzerland	Hallenstadion	21,000 / 21,000	$2,501,450
24 October 2014	Vienna	Austria	Wiener Stadthalle	—	—
25 October 2014	Vienna	Austria	Wiener Stadthalle	—	—
27 October 2014	Stuttgart	Germany	Hanns-Martin-Schleyer-Halle	—	—
28 October 2014	Stuttgart	Germany	Hanns-Martin-Schleyer-Halle	—	—
30 October 2014	Munich	Germany	Olympiahalle	—	—
31 October 2014	Munich	Germany	Olympiahalle	—	—
2 November 2014	Cologne	Germany	Lanxess Arena	—	—
3 November 2014	Cologne	Germany	Lanxess Arena	—	—
5 November 2014	Mannheim	Germany	SAP Arena	—	—
6 November 2014	Mannheim	Germany	SAP Arena	—	—
8 November 2014	Hamburg	Germany	O2 World	—	—
9 November 2014	Hamburg	Germany	O2 World	—	—
12 November 2014	Berlin	Germany	O2 World	38,126 / 38,126	$2,560,160
13 November 2014	Berlin	Germany	O2 World	38,126 / 38,126	$2,560,160
14 November 2014	Berlin	Germany	O2 World	38,126 / 38,126	$2,560,160
Leg 2 — Europe
26 May 2015	Düsseldorf	Germany	ISS Dome	10,000 / 10,000	—
28 May 2015	Hasselt	Belgium	Ethias Arena	7,902 / 10,098	$611,222
30 May 2015	Herning	Denmark	Jyske Bank Boxen	—	—
2 June 2015	Rostock	Germany	DKB-Arena	25,000 / 25,000	—
4 June 2015	Hamburg	Germany	Volksparkstadion	72,000 / 72,000	—
5 June 2015	Hamburg	Germany	Volksparkstadion	72,000 / 72,000	—
7 June 2015	Hanover	Germany	Niedersachsenstadion	40,000 / 40,000	—
10 June 2015	Frankfurt	Germany	Commerzbank-Arena	36,000 / 36,000	—
13 June 2015	Munich	Germany	Olympiastadion	55,000 / 55,000	—
15 June 2015	Cologne	Germany	RheinEnergieStadion	74,000 / 74,000	—
16 June 2015	Cologne	Germany	RheinEnergieStadion	74,000 / 74,000	—
18 June 2015	Stuttgart	Germany	Mercedes-Benz Arena	40,000 / 40,000	—
20 June 2015	Gelsenkirchen	Germany	Veltins-Arena	90,000 / 90,000	—
21 June 2015	Gelsenkirchen	Germany	Veltins-Arena	90,000 / 90,000	—
23 June 2015	Basel	Switzerland	St. Jakob-Park	32,000 / 32,000	—
25 June 2015	Nuremberg	Germany	Frankenstadion	40,000 / 40,000	—
27 June 2015	Leipzig	Germany	Red Bull Arena	74,000 / 74,000	—
28 June 2015	Leipzig	Germany	Red Bull Arena	74,000 / 74,000	—
30 June 2015	Vienna	Austria	Ernst-Happel-Stadion	90,000 / 90,000	—
1 July 2015	Vienna	Austria	Ernst-Happel-Stadion	90,000 / 90,000	—
4 July 2015	Berlin	Germany	Olympiastadion	120,000 / 120,000	—
5 July 2015	Berlin	Germany	Olympiastadion	120,000 / 120,000	—
7 July 2015	Dresden	Germany	Glücksgas Stadium	50,000 / 50,000	—
8 July 2015	Dresden	Germany	Glücksgas Stadium	50,000 / 50,000	—
Total				907,126 / 907,126	$48,672,832
