= Dave Lee discography =

This is the discography for British DJ Dave Lee.

== Albums ==
- 1993 Universe of Love (as Joey Negro)
- 1997 Get Down Tonight (with Andrew Livingstone)
- 1998 Here Comes the Sunburst Band (as The Sunburst Band)
- 2002 Visions (as Jakatta)
- 2002 Visions The Remixes (as Jakatta)
- 2004 Until the End of Time (as The Sunburst Band)
- 2008 Moving with the Shakers (as The Sunburst Band)
- 2008 Doug's Disco Brain (as Doug Willis)
- 2009 The Remixes (as The Sunburst Band)
- 2010 The Phuture Ain't What It Used to Be (as Akabu)
- 2012 The Secret Life of Us (as The Sunburst Band)
- 2010 The Phuture: Remixed (as Akabu)
- 2013 The Mystery Of Mistura (as Mistura)
- 2017 Produced With Love (as Joey Negro)
- 2022 Produced With Love II
- 2023 Metamorphosis (as AC Soul Symphony)

== Compilations ==
- 1988 "The Garage Sound of Deepest New York"
- 1989 "Paradise Regained: The Garage Sound of Deepest New York Vol. 2"
- 1991 "The Garage Sound Volume III – The Third Generation"
- 1995 "Disco House Mixed by Joey Negro"
- 1996 "The Garage Sound Volume 4"
- 1997 "Disco Connection"
- 1997 "Jumpin'"
- 1998 "Jumpin' 2"
- 1999 "Disco Spectrum"
- 1999 "Can't Get High Without U"
- 2000 "Disco Spectrum 2"
- 2000 "The Voyage"
- 2000 "Disco Not Disco" (with Sean P)
- 2001 "Nite:Life 08"
- 2002 "Disco Spectrum 3"
- 2002 "Disco Not Disco Vol.2" (with Sean P)
- 2003 "Back to the Scene of the Crime"
- 2003 "Southport Weekender (with Gilles Peterson & Miguel Migs)
- 2003 "Pleasure House"
- 2003 "Joey Negro's Non-Stop Funky Mix"
- 2005 "In the Beginning"
- 2005 "In the House"
- 2005 "The Soul of Disco Vol.1" (with Sean P)
- 2006 "The Trip – Navigated by Joey Negro"
- 2006 "Destination Boogie" (with Sean P)
- 2006 "The Many Faces of Joey Negro Vol.1"
- 2007 "Back in the Box"
- 2007 "Lust – Art & Soul: A Personal Collection by Joey Negro"
- 2007 "Supafunkanova" (with Sean P)
- 2008 "Joey Negro presents On A Soulful Tip"
- 2009 "Locked in the Vinyl Cellar"
- 2009 "The Many Faces of Joey Negro Vol.2"
- 2009 "The Many Faces of Joey Negro Vol.2"
- 2010 "Backstreet Brit Funk"
- 2010 "20 Years of Joey Negro" (with Grant Nelson)
- 2011 "The Soul of Disco Vol.2" (with Sean P)
- 2011 "The Soul of Disco Vol.3"
- 2011 "Disco House Party compiled by Joey Negro"
- 2011 "Joey Negro presents. It's A Summer Groove Vol.2"
- 2012 "Go Go Get Down"
- 2012 "Joey Negro presents Nu Disco Daze & Re-Edit Nights"
- 2012 "Joey Negro presents It's A Summer Groove Vol.3*
- 2012 "Joey Negro's 2012 Essentials"
- 2013 "Remixed with Love Vol. 1 by Joey Negro"
- 2013 "Joey Negro presents On A Soulful Tip Vol.2"
- 2013 "Joey Negro Presents It's A Summer Groove Vol.4"
- 2013 "Joey Negro's 2013 Essentials"
- 2014 "Italo House Compiled by Joey Negro"
- 2015 "Le Freak (Music Inspired By Chic)"
- 2015 "House Masters"
- 2015 "Joey Negro presents It's A Summer Groove Vol.5"
- 2015 "Joey Negro & Sean P - Supafunkanova Vol:2"
- 2015 "Joey Negro & Neil Pierce - 90's House & Garage Vol.1"
- 2015 "Joey Negro's 2015 Essentials"
- 2016 "Remixed with Love Vol. 2 by Joey Negro"
- 2017 "Joey Negro + Sean P* - The Best Of Disco Spectrum"
- 2017 "Electro Compiled by Joey Negro"
- 2018 "Remixed with Love Vol. 3 by Joey Negro"
- 2018 "Backstreet Brit Funk Vol. 2"
- 2018 "Joey Negro's 2018 Essentials"
- 2019 "Joey Negro's 2019 Essentials"
- 2020 "Joey Negro & Neil Pierce - 90's House & Garage Vol.2"
- 2020 "30 Years Of Z Records"
- 2020 "Dave Lee's Essentials 2020"
- 2020 "Dave Lee & Will Fox - Breaking The Beats"
- 2021 "Dave Lee's Essentials 2021"
- 2022 "Dave Lee's Essentials 2022"
- 2022 "Dave Lee's Essentials 2022"

== Singles ==
Dave Lee

- 2002 "Love Is Freedom" (with Ewan Kelly)
- 2005 "You're Not Alone" (with Michele Chiavarini and Ann Saunderson)
- 2007 "Latronica"
- 2008 "Mucho Macho"
- 2010 "As Long as I Got You" (with Conan Liquid Remixes)
- 2020 "Power Of The Mind feat. Billy Valentine
- 2021 "Dave Lee & Horse Meat Disco feat. Angela Johnson - Dancing Into The Stars"
- 2022 "Dave & Omar - Starlight"
- 2022 "Dave & Omar - Starlight (7" Version)"
- 2022 "Dave & Omar - Starlight (Grant Nelson Extended Mix)"
- 2023 "Dave & Maurissa - Look At The Stars (2-Step Soul Mix)"
- 2023 "Dave & Maurissa - Look At The Stars"

Joey Negro

- 1990 "Do It, Believe It"
- 1991 Above & Beyond EP (with Andrew Livingstone and Viv Hope-Scott)
- 1991 "Do What You Feel" (with Andrew Livingstone, Viv Hope-Scott and Debbie French) - #36 UK
- 1991 "Reachin'" - #70 UK
- 1992 Enter Your Fantasy EP - #35 UK
- 1992 "Feel Your Body" (with Andrew Livingstone)
- 1993 "What Happened to the Music" (with The Trammps and Andrew Livingstone) - #52 UK
- 1993 "So Deep" (with Reese Project)
- 1993 "What a Life/Universe of Love" (with The Trammps)
- 1997 "Can't Get High Without U" (with Pete Z. and Taka Boom) - #1 US Dance
- 1999 "Must Be the Music" (with Taka Boom) - #8 UK
- 2000 "Saturday" (with Taka Boom) - #41 UK
- 2005 "Make a Move on Me" (with Taka Boom) - #11 UK, #59 Australia, #40 Ireland, #1 US Dance
- 2008 "Ride the Rhythm"
- 2008 "Love Hangover"
- 2010 "Can't Get High Without U" (with David Penn Remixes)
- 2010 "Beyond the Dance" (with The Revenge Remixes)
- 2010 "20 Years of Joey Negro Sampler" (with Grant Nelson Remixes)
- 2011 "Feel It" (with Alex Kenji Remix)
- 2011 "No Sugar" (with Gramophonedzie & Shea Soul)
- 2011 "Must Be the Music" (with Crazibiza Remixes)
- 2013 "Joey Negro Presents Mistura Feat. Kendra Cash - Smile (Shur-i-kan Remixes)"
- 2013 "I Need Somebody Tonight" (with Thelma Houston)
- 2014 "Candidate for Love" (with Horse Meat Disco)
- 2015 "I Can Feel Your Body Rock"
- 2017 "Joey Negro Feat. Linda Clifford - Won't Let Go"
- 2017 "Latican Boogie (Crackazat Remix)"
- 2017 "Space Time EP"
- 2017 "Stomp Your Feet"
- 2017 "Prove That You're Feelin Me / Everything"
- 2018 "Distorted Dreams EP"
- 2018 "Distorting Space Time Remix EP"

Joey Montenegro

- 2023 "Do What You Feel (Birdee Remix)"
- 2023 "Make A Move On Me (Original Disco Mix)"

Jakatta

- 2000 "American Dream" - #3 UK, #63 Australia
- 2001 "American Dream (Remix)" - #63 UK
- 2001 "So Lonely" (with Monsoon) - #8 UK, #51 Australia
- 2002 "My Vision" (with Seal) - #6 UK, #43 Australia
- 2002 "One Fine Day" (with Beth Hirsch) - #39 UK
- 2004 "Visions"
- 2005 "Scattering Stars"
- 2005 "Shimmering Stars" (with Michele Chiavarini)
- 2012 "American Dream" (with Supernova Remixes)
- 2012 "Scattering Stars" (with Ogris Debris Remixes)
- 2014 "American Dream" (with Andre Crom & Chi Thanh Remix)
- 2020 "My Vision (The Vision Remix)"
- 2022 "American Dream (Atjazz Extended Remix)"

Raven Maize

- 1989 "Together Forever" (with Mark Ryder, Romana Brooks and Blaze) - #67 UK
- 1996 "Together Forever '96"
- 2001 "The Real Life" - #12 UK
- 2002 "Fascinated" (with Michele Chiavarini and Katherine Ellis) - #37 UK
- 2012 "Fascinated" (with Alex Kenji Remixes)
- 2023 "The Real Life (David Penn Remix)"

The Sunburst Band

The band includes Michele Chiavarini, Julian Crampton, Thomas Dyani-Akuru, Tony Remy, Michael J. Parlett & Colin Graham

- 1997 Sunburn EP (with Jessica Lauren)
- 1998 "Ease Your Mind"
- 1999 "Garden of Love"
- 1999 Radiant EP (with Michele Chiavarini)
- 2003 "Big Blow"
- 2004 "Everyday"
- 2004 "Thin Air / Everyday / U Make Me So Hot (Remixes)"
- 2004 "Far Beyond" (with Michele Chiavarini)
- 2004 "Fly Away" (with Pete Simpson)
- 2004 "Just Do It/Every Day" (with Luci Martin, Norma Jean Wright and Taka Boom)
- 2004 Thin Air EP (with Taka Boom)
- 2005 "He Is/Fly Away" (with Audiowhores Remixes)
- 2005 "U Make Me So Hot" (with YamWho? & BT Remixes)
- 2006 "For All Eternity/Twinkle" (with Idjut Boys Remixes)
- 2008 "Rough Times" (with Yolanda Wyns)
- 2008 "Fashion/Journey to the Sun" (with Pete Simpson and Katherine Ellis)
- 2008 "Journey to the Sun / Our Lives Are Shaped / Fashion" (with Dennis Ferrer & Elektrons Remixes)
- 2008 "Survivin'" (with Leroy Burgess) (with Milton Jackson & IG Culture Remixes)
- 2009 "Man of War" (with Henrik Schwarz, Idjut Boys & YamWho? Remixes)
- 2009 "Our Lives Are Shaped / We Can Live Forever" (with Grant Nelson & Simon Grey Remixes)
- 2009 "Put a Lyric in It" (with The Revenge, DJ Meme & Cool Million Remixes)
- 2009 "The Remixes Album Sampler" (with Kaje Trackheadz, Recloose & YamWho? Remixes)
- 2009 "Our Lives Are Shaped" (with Grant Nelson & Simon Grey Remixes)
- 2011 "Rough Times" (with Sean McCabe Remixes)
- 2012 "The Remixes" (with Opolopo, Andreas Saag & Atjazz Remixes)
- 2012 "Where The Lights Meet The Music (Atjazz Remixes)"
- 2012 "In the Thick of It" (with Angela Johnson)
- 2012 "Dialed Up (Andreas Saag & Joey Negro Mixes)"
- 2012 "I Need Somebody Tonight (Audiowhores Remix)"
- 2013 "Record Store Day Special"
- 2013 "The Secret Life of Us" (with Directors Cut Signature Remixes)
- 2013 "Definition of Luv" (with Sean McCabe Remixes)
- 2013 "I'll Be There 4 U (Garden of Love)" (with Spiritchaser Remix)
- 2014 "Only Time Will Tell" featuring Angela Johnson (with Joey Negro Remix)
- 2014 Face the Fire EP
- 2015 "The Reflex Revisions"
- 2020 "Big Blow (Moodena Remix)"
- 2020 "Perdoname w/Sunlightsquare"
- 2021 "He Is (Jimpster Remix)"
- 2021 "Listen Love"
- 2022 "Garden Of Love (Dam Swindle Remix)"
- 2023 "Secret Life Of Us (Special 45 Version)"

Doug Willis

- 1993 Syndrum Syndrome EP
- 1995 "Bodyshine"
- 1996 Down to the Disco EP
- 1997 Doug-Ism EP
- 1998 "Armed and Extremely Douglas" (with Michele Chiavarini and Taka Boom)
- 1998 Doug Shit EP (with Michele Chiavarini and Carolyn Harding)
- 2000 "Skate Dancer" (with Taka Boom)
- 2003 "Get Your Own"
- 2005 "I Know You, I Live You" (with Yolanda Wyns)
- 2007 "Doug Dastardly" (with Michele Chiavarini and Pete Simpson)
- 2007 "Dougswana" (with Zeke Manikiya and Michele Chiavarini)
- 2008 "Doug Biscuit / Spread Love / Dougswana" (with Audiowhores Remixes)
- 2011 Douggy Style EP
- 2012 Was Doug a Doughnut EP
- 2013 "Spread Love" (with Alex Kenji Remixes)
- 2014 Doug Mess on the Dancefloor EP
- 2021 "The Mighty Douglas (Doug's Godbizniss Mix)"
- 2022 "Dougswana (Emmaculate Remix)"

Prospect Park

- 1997 "Movin' On" (with Carolyn Harding) - #55 UK
- 1999 "ESP" (with Bernard Thomas and Carolyn Harding)
- 2001 "Surrender" (with Mr. Pink)
- 2002 "I Got This Feelin'" (with Michele Chiavarini and Taka Boom)
- 2003 "Spinnin'" (with Michele Chiavarini and Linda Clifford)
- 2005 "Get Down Tonight"
- 2021 "The Kinda Love (JKriv Remixes)"
- 2021 "Shake It Up Tonight"

Mistura

- 1998 "Tonight" (with Maxine McClain)
- 1999 "Think Positive" (with Michele Chiavarini, Viv Hope-Scott and Carolyn Harding)
- 1999 "Runnin'" (with Luke Smith, Viv Hope-Scott and Carolyn Harding)
- 2002 "Sweet Magic" (with Michele Chiavarini and Taana Gardner)
- 2011 "Better Things to Come" (with Kadija Kamara)
- 2013 "Smile" (with Kendra Cash) (with Shur-i-kan Remixes)
- 2022 "Want Me Back (Jimpster Remixes)"
- 2023 "If You Ever Need Somebody feat Tiffany T'Zelle (7"Version)"

Sessomatto

- 1996 "I'm Back"
- 1996 "Can't Fight the Feeling" (with Taka Boom)
- 2000 "Moody" (with Michele Chiavarini and Taka Boom)
- 2003 "I Need Somebody" (with Thelma Houston)
- 2006 "Movin' On" (with Michele Chiavarini and Carolyn Harding)
- 2007 "You're Gonna Love Me" (with Carolyn Harding)
- 2007 "Spring Sampler"
- 2009 "You're Gonna Love Me" (with Denis Naidanow Remixes)
- 2011 "All Over the World"/"Give It to Me"
- 2011 1988 EP

Z Factor

- 1996 "Gotta Keep Pushin'"
- 1999 "Give It on Up"
- 1999 "Make a Move on Me"
- 2001 "Ride The Rhythm"
- 2002 "Rock Ur Body"
- 2007 "Moody / Bang"
- 2008 "We'll Keep Climbing / Somebody" (with Dawn Tallman and Manfred Orange)
- 2010 "Makes You Crazy / The Piano Principle"
- 2011 "Keep On Jumpin'" (with Luigi Rocca Remix)
- 2012 "Sounds in the Air" (with Soul Purpose Remix)
- 2014 "Get in 2 the Music" (with Joey Negro Remix)

Foreal People

- 1998 "Does It Feel Good 2U?" (with Michele Chiavarini and Taka Boom)
- 1999 "Discotizer" (with Michele Chiavarini, Taka Boom and Dave Clarke)
- 1999 "Shake" (with David Grant)
- 2001 "Gotta Thing" (with Michele Chiavarini and Taana Gardner)
- 2023 "Foreal to Real EP"

Akabu

- 2000 "Your Wildest Dreams" (with Michele Chiavarini and Viv Hope-Scott)
- 2001 "Ride the Storm" (Michele Chiavarini and Linda Clifford) - #69 UK
- 2003 "The Way"
- 2004 "Don't Hold Back" (with Michele Chiavarini and Steve Burton)
- 2005 "Phuture Bound" (with Michele Chiavarini)
- 2006 "Phuture Bound Remixes" (with Ame & Shur-i-kan Remixes)
- 2006 "I'm Not Afraid of the Future" (with Michele Chiavarini, Pete Simpson and Yoland Wynns)
- 2007 "I'm Not Afraid of the Future (Remixes)" (with DJ Fudge & Jimpster Remixes)
- 2009 "Sax My Bitch Up" (with Audiojack Remix)
- 2010 "Another Generation" (with Jimpster & THomas Gold Remixes)
- 2010 "If You Want It All" (with Motor City Drum Ensemble Remix)
- 2010 "Another World" (with Andre Lodemann Remix)
- 2011 "Life Is So Strange" (with Tony Momrelle)
- 2011 "Life Is So Strange" (with Deetron & Lovebirds Remixes)
- 2011 "The Big Room Mixes EP" (with Thomas Gold, Ron May & Audiojack Remixes)
- 2011 "The Phuture Ain't What It Used to Be" (with Yass & Spirit Catcher Remixes)
- 2012 Crystalised EP (with Foremost Poets)
- 2013 "Everybody Wants Something" (with Alex Mills)
- 2013 "Again" (with Giom and Kadija Kamara)
- 2014 "Everybody Wants Something" Feat. Alex Mills (with Kolombo and Giom Remixes)
- 2020 "Ride The Storm ft. Linda Clifford (Saison Remix)"
- 2023 "Highways feat. Jinadu"

AC Soul Symphony

- 2007 The Kinda Love
- 2007 "What's Happening" (with Michele Chiavarini and Pete Simpson)
- 2010 "Still in Love" (with Ricci Benson)
- 2020 "Manhattan Skyline"
- 2023 "The Philly Avengers (7" Version)"
- 2023 "I Want To See You Dance / The Talented Mr Adams"

Lakeshore Commission

- 2022 "In 2 The Light"

Jean Aubergine

- 2022 "Disco Numberwang"
- 2023 "Disco Numberwang (Yukek Remix)"

Destiny II

- 2022 "Play 2 Win""
- 2022 "I'm Here For This feat. Aria Lyric (7" Version)"

Risqué Connection

- 2022 "Saturday (Michael Gray Remixes)"

Roland Wrightangle

- 2021 "In Your Blood feat. Darcus"

Ja'shay

- 2021 "Shout Hallelujah" (Dave Lee Redemption Mix)"

Jayenne

- 2021 "Love Fantasy (Dr. Packer Remix)"

M-D-Emm

- 1988 Get Acidic EP, as M-D-Emm (with Mike Cheal and Mark Ryder)
- 1988 "Burn It Down", as M-D-Emm (with Mike Cheal and Mark Ryder)
- 1988 "Don't Stop (We're So Hot)", as M-D-Emm (with Mike Cheal and Mark Ryder)
- 1988 "Fanning the Flames", as M-D-Emm (with Mike Cheal and Mark Ryder)
- 1988 "Get Busy (It's Party Time)", as M-D-Emm (with Mike Cheal and Mark Ryder) - #100 UK
- 1988 Playin' with Fire EP, as M-D-Emm (with Mike Cheal and Mark Ryder) - #98 UK
- 1989 "Get Hip to This", as M-D-Emm (with Mike Cheal, Mark Ryder and Nasih) - #86 UK
- 1989 "I Wanna Do It", as 2 the Max (with Mike Cheal)

NOTE: Dave Lee left M-D-Emm after 1990; the name was continued by Mark Ryder.

Skeletor

- 1989 "Do You Want Me" (with Mark Ryder)

Masters of the Universe

- 1989 "Check It Out" (with Mark Ryder)
- 1990 "Space Talk"

Energise

- 1990 "Report to the Dancefloor"

Life on Earth

- 1990 "Can't Give You Up" (with Andrew Livingstone, Pat Leacock and Winston Marvaya)

Pacha

- 1991 "One Kiss" (with Blaze and Debbie French)
- 2011 "One Kiss" (with Matt Bandy Remixes)

Swingtime Dee

- 1993 "You & I / Motivation"
- 1996 Your Wildest Dreams"

Agora

- 1994 Latin Connection EP
- 2009 "Montayo" (with Mark Grant Remixes)

Cookie

- 1994 "Choose Me"
- 1997 "Best Part of Me"

The Away Team

- 1994 "Our Love" (with Andrew Livingstone and Gerideau)
- 1995 "On My Mind"

Hedboys

- 1994 "Girls & Boys" (with Andrew Livingstone)
- 1995 Mutual DIY EP

Fibre Foundation

- 1995 "Weekend"

Jupiter Beyond

- 1995 Stargazer EP

Men from Mars

- 1995 Life on Mars EP (with Andrew Livingstone)
- 1995 Sun Power EP

Mankind

- 1997 "Make It Hot / Don't Keep Me Waiting"

Raw Essence

- 1999 "The Loving Game / Sweet Embrace" (with Michele Chiavarini and Maxine McClain)
- 2000 "Do U Love What U Feel", as Raw Essence (with Maxine McClain)
- 2022 "Do It Again feat. Lifford"

Mr. Pink presents The Program

- 2001 "Love & Affection" (with Mr. Pink) - #22 UK

Il Padrinos

- 2002 "That's How Good Your Love Is" (with Danny Rampling and Jocelyn Brown)

Erro

- 2004 "Change for Me"

Tamara's World

- 2006 Trampoline (with Katherine Ellis)

Brad Hed

- 2007 "The Girlz & Boyz" (with Andrew Livingstone)
- 2009 "The Real Life"
- 2013 "The Girls & Boys" (with Crazibiza Remix)

Kola Kube

- 2011 "Why" (with Diane Charlemagne) (with Hot Toddy Remixes)
- 2012 "Break My Heart" (with Choklate)
- 2012 "Everybody Needs Somebody" (Faze Action Remixes)

Sadam Ant

- 2013 "Daft Funk"

Azucar

- 2013 "Let Your Body Rock" (with Kyodai Remixes)
