= Joy FM =

Joy FM may refer to:

== Australia ==
- 3JOY, or Joy 94.9, in Melbourne

== Canada ==
- CIXN-FM, licensed to Fredericton, New Brunswick

== Ghana ==
- JOY FM (Ghana)

== Japan ==
- FM Miyazaki

== United States ==
- KLJY, licensed to Clayton, Missouri
- KSDA-FM, licensed to Agat, Guam
- WJIS, licensed to Bradenton, Florida
- WPJW, licensed to Hurricane, West Virginia
- WVFJ-FM, licensed to Manchester, Georgia
- WXRI, licensed to Winston-Salem, North Carolina, the flagship station of Positive Alternative Radio
  - WJYJ, licensed to Hickory, North Carolina
  - WODY, licensed to Martinsville, Virginia
  - WRFE, licensed to Chesterfield, South Carolina
  - WTJY, licensed to Asheboro, North Carolina
  - WTTX-FM, licensed to Appomattox, Virginia
- WBCT, licensed to Grand Rapids, Michigan, known as Joy FM from 1986 to 1988
- WBOC-FM, licensed to Princess Anne, Maryland, known as Joy 102.5 until 2015
- WHYT, licensed to Goodland Township, Michigan, known as Joy FM from 2000 to 2004
- WJMR-FM licensed to Milwaukee, Wisconsin, known as Joy FM from 1979 to 1983
- WJYW, licensed to Union City, Indiana, known as Joy FM from 1999 to 2015
- WSJY, licensed to Fort Atkinson, Wisconsin, formerly known as Joy FM
