= Joy (disambiguation) =

Joy is an emotion in response to a pleasant observation or a remembrance thereof.

Joy or JOY may also refer to:

== People and fictional characters ==
- Joy (given name), a list of people and fictional characters
- Joy (surname), a list of people
- Joy (singer) (born 1996), member of South Korean band Red Velvet
- Joy (model) (born 1985), Japanese model and TV personality
- Joy (Australian musician)
- Joy (Inside Out), protagonist of the Pixar franchise Inside Out

== Places ==
=== United States ===
- Joy, Arkansas
- Joy, Illinois
- Joy, Kansas
- Joy, Kentucky
- Joy, Missouri
- Joy, Ohio
- Joy, Oklahoma
- Joy, Texas
- Joy, West Virginia
- Joy, Utah
- Mount Joy, a small mountain in Valley Forge National Historical Park

=== Elsewhere ===
- Joy (crater), a lunar crater
- Joy Range, Nunavut, Canada
- Mount Joy, a small hill in Durham, England

== Music ==
=== Bands ===
- Joy (Austrian band)
- Joy (South African band)

=== Albums ===
- Joy (Steven Curtis Chapman album), 2012
- Joy (Fefe Dobson album), and the title track
- Joy (Isaac Hayes album), 1973
- Joy (Jah Roots album), 2008
- Joy (Joy album), 1976
- Joy (Paul King album), 1987
- Joy (Shizuka Kudo album)
- Joy (Crystal Lewis album)
- Joy (Phish album), and the title track
- Joy (Psychic TV VHS), 1989
- Joy (Minutemen EP), 1989
- Joy (Skids album)
- Joy (The Stalin album), 1989
- Joy (Teddy Pendergrass album), 1988
- Joy (Woo!ah! EP), 2022
- Joy: A Christmas Collection, by the group Avalon
- Joy, an album by Yuki Isoya
- Joy, an album by Paper Aeroplanes
- Joy, album by Joe Nina, 1996

=== Songs ===
- "Joy" (Apollo 100 song), an instrumental from 1971
- "Joy", a song by Harry Nilsson on the album Son of Schmilsson released in 1972
- "Joy", a song by Gerry Niewood on the album Gerry Niewood & Timepiece released in 1977
- "Joy" (Band AKA song), 1983
- "Joy" (Marvin Gaye song), 1983
- "Joy" (Psychic TV song), 1988
- "Joy" (Teddy Pendergrass song), 1988
- "Joy" (The Sundays song), 1990
- "Joy" (François Feldman song), 1992
- "Joy" (Staxx song), 1993
- "Joy" (7669 song), 1994
- "Joy" (Blackstreet song), 1994
- "Joy" (Toni Pearen song), 1995
- "Joy", a single by Newsboys, 2000
- "Joy" (Mark Ryder song), 2000
- "Joy" (For King & Country song), 2018
- "Joy" (Bastille song), 2019
- "Joy" (Mick Jagger song)
- "Joy" (Raye song), 2026
- "Joy", a song by Against Me! on the album Searching for a Former Clarity
- "Joy", a song by Dry Cleaning on the album Secret Love
- "Joy", a song by Iron & Wine on the album Ghost on Ghost
- "Joy", a song by Jeremih and Chance the Rapper from Merry Christmas Lil' Mama
- "Joy", a song by Lucinda Williams on the album Car Wheels on a Gravel Road
- "Joy", a song by Mclusky
- "Joy", a song by Soul II Soul on the album Just Right Vol. III
- "Joy", a song by VNV Nation on the album Praise the Fallen
- "Joy", a song by Whitney Houston from The Preacher's Wife: Original Soundtrack Album
- "Joy", a song by Yuki Isoya
- “Joy”, a song by Will Young taken from his sixth studio album released as the records second promotional single and was heavily featured in the Morrisons adverts.
- "Joy", a song by Withered Hand from Good News
- "Joy", a song by Post Malone from Austin
- "Joy", a song by Ben Rector from The Joy of Music
- "Joy", a song by the Lightning Seeds from Cloudcuckooland
- ”JOY” a song by Ellie Goulding from Halcyon

== Literature ==
- Joy (Bernanos novel), a 1929 novel by Georges Bernanos
- Joy (Hunt novel), a 1990 novel by Marsha Hunt
- Joy (novels), a series of novels by Joy Laurey
- Joy (magazine), an international women's magazine

== Television and film ==
- Joy, a 2005 Israeli film. Hebrew title: Muchrachim Lehiyot Same'ach
- Joy (2010 film), a 2010 Dutch film
- Joy (2015 film), a 2015 American film starring Jennifer Lawrence
- Joy (2018 film), a 2018 Austrian film
- Joy (2024 film), a 2024 British film
- "Joy" (House), a 2008 television episode

== Vehicles ==
=== Automobiles ===
- Chevrolet Onix, an American-Brazilian subcompact car, base model sold as Chevrolet Joy
- Daewoo Matiz, a South Korean city car, sold as Chevrolet Joy in Pakistan
- Daihatsu Cast, a Japanese city car, also sold as Toyota Pixis Joy

=== Watercraft ===
- USS Joy (SP-643), a patrol vessel of the United States Navy
- USS Turner Joy (DD-951), a Forrest Sherman-class destroyer of the United States Navy, originally called USS Joy

== Other uses ==
- Joy (dishwashing liquid)
- Joy (dog), an English Cocker Spaniel owned by Alexei Nikolaevich, Tsarevich of Russia
- Joy (musical), a 2022 stage musical
- Joy (perfume)
- Joy (programming language)
- Joy 94.9, a radio station
- Joy Compressor, a make of air and gas compressors
- Joy FC, a Lesotho football club
- Joy FM (disambiguation), a name used by many radio stations
- Cyclone Joy, struck Australia in late 1990
- Joy, the fictional euphoric drug in the video game We Happy Few

== See also ==
- Joye
- Joys (shipwreck), a steamboat that sank in Lake Michigan
- The Joy (disambiguation)
