= M-D-Emm =

- Origin: England
- Genres: Electronic, hardcore, acid house
- Years active: 1988–1993
- Labels: Strictly Underground Records; Republic Records/Rough Trade
- Past members: Dave Lee; Mark Ryder; Emmanuel Cheal

M-D-Emm were an English electronic music trio which consisted of Dave Lee, Emmanuel Cheal (a.k.a. Mike Cheal) and Mark Ryder. The group's name is a combination of each member's first names; Mark, Dave and Emmanuel. Five of their singles charted on the UK Singles Chart between 1988 and 1992. The group disbanded c. 1990, with Ryder continuing the name as a solo act until 1993.

After M-D-Emm, Dave Lee found success as a DJ and producer under numerous aliases including Joey Negro, Jakatta, Doug Willis, Raven Maize, Prospect Park and Sessomatto as well as being part of the Sunburst Band. His most successful releases include "American Dream", "So Lonely", "My Vision" and "Must Be the Music".

Mark Ryder also continued as a DJ and producer, releasing records under numerous aliases in the breakbeat hardcore, drum and bass, house and UK garage genres on his Strictly Underground label. Among his best known releases is the garage track "Joy".

== Discography ==
=== Singles ===
- "Don't Stop, We're So Hot" (1988), Airplay Records/Carrere
- "Get Busy (It's Partytime!)" (1988), Republic Records - UK #100
- "Playin' with Fire" (1988), Republic Records - UK #98
- "1666 / Get Acidic" (1988), Transmat
- "Fanning the Flames" (1988), Republic Records
- "Get Hip to This!" (featuring Nasih) (1989), Republic Records - UK #86
- "Get Down" (1991), Strictly Underground - UK #55
- "Move Your Feet" (1992), Strictly Underground - UK #67
- "Splif Up & Chill Out" (1992), Strictly Underground
- "Got Any Hardcore?" (1992), Strictly Underground
- "Fly Free" (featuring Michelle Barratt) (1993), Strictly Underground
- "Energy Rush (The Mixes)" (1993), Strictly Underground
- "The Bootleggers" (1993), Strictly Underground
