= Joyes =

Joyes may refer to:

- Joyes (department store), a business in Grays, Essex from 1900 to 1975
- Inés Joyes y Blake (1731–1808), Spanish translator and writer
- John Joyes (1799–1877), Kentucky lawyer and politician
- Richard Joyes, Australian recipient of the Cross of Valour

== See also ==
- Joy (disambiguation)
- Joye
