= Club Nation (album) =

Remix album by Richard Evans
- Released: 6 April 1998
- Recorded: 1995–1998
- Genre: Electronica, house, big beat, breakbeat
- Length: 156:27
- Label: Virgin Records/EMI
- Producer: Unknown
- Compiler: Ashley Abram

Richard Evans chronology
Club Nation (1998)	Club Nation 2: Mixed by Danny Rampling and Tall Paul (1998)

Club Nation is a mix album/compilation album, mixed by Richard Evans and compiled by Ashley Abraham, that was released on 6 April 1998. The compilation is a club mix album that consists of contemporary club tracks. The album is known for the Evian advertising contained within the CD booklet.

== Evian advertising ==
The Evian logo is present on the album cover and in 6 pages of the booklet, whilst "CD1" of the album features a full Evian bottle and "CD2" features a crushed Evian bottle. Evian had entered into a partnership with EMI and Virgin Records for the Club Nation release, with the move representing a more youthful image for the brand.

== Songs and mixing ==
The album includes the rare extended version of the Norman Cook remix of "Brimful of Asha" and the "Rock n Roll" remix of Let Me Entertain You".

== Reception ==
Professional ratings
Review scores
Source	Rating
Allmusic	3/5 stars

Jason Birchmeier of Allmusic gave the album three out of five stars, saying, "it seems far too U.K.-influenced for its own good," and concluding, "It parades itself as being Australian, but at heart it's nothing but a masked U.K. mix."

== Track listing ==
=== Disc one ===
No.	Title	Artist	Length
1.	"Renegade Master" (Fatboy Slim Old Skool Mix)	Wildchild	4:52
2.	"Brimful Of Asha" (Norman Cook Extended Mix)	Cornershop	6:30
3.	"Never Ever" (Booker T's Vocal Mix)	All Saints	5:47
4.	"Love Shy" (Tuff Jam Classic Vocal)	Kristine Blond	4:20
5.	"Bamboogie" (12" Vocal Mix)	Bamboo	5:15
6.	"You Make Me Feel (Mighty Real)" (Don Carlos Club Mix)	Byron Stingily	3:50
7.	"It's Like That" (Drop The Break)	Run DMC vs Jason Nevins	5:09
8.	"Meet Her At The Love Parade" (Nalin & Kane Mix)	Da Hool	5:13
9.	"Shout To The Top" (Industry Standard Uprising Mix)	Fire Island feat. Loleatta Holloway	4:04
10.	"Here's Where The Story Ends" (Canny Remix)	Tin Tin Out	6:05
11.	"The Promise" (Space Brother Rethink Remix)	Essence	5:15
12.	"Let Me Show You" (Tall Paul Remix)	Carisma	4:49
13.	"Bellissima" (Original Mix)	DJ Quicksilver	2:23
14.	"Choose Life" (Radio Edit)	PF Project feat. Ewan McGregor	3:44
15.	"Seven Days & One Week" (Original Version)	B.B.E.	3:42
16.	"Who Am I" (Original Version)	Beenie Man	3:12
17.	"Music In My Mind" (Original Mix)	Adam F	3:50

=== Disc two ===
No.	Title	Artist	Length
1.	"Fusion" (Album Version)	Sven Vath	3:30
2.	"Make The World Go Round" (Deep Dish Radio Edit)	Sandy B	3:40
3.	"Closer Than Close" (Mentor Club Mix)	Rosie Gaines	4:57
4.	"Free" (Mood II Swing Vocal Mix)	Ultra Naté	5:15
5.	"Somebody Else's Guy" (Tuff Jam's Classic Garage)	CeCe Peniston	4:47
6.	"Professional Widow" (Armand's Star Trunk Funkin' Mix)	Tori Amos	3:02
7.	"All That Matters" (DJ Tonka Mix)	Louise	4:44
8.	"Anytime" (Original Mix)	Nu-Birth	4:37
9.	"Give Me Rhythm" (Full Intention Club Mix)	Black Connection	6:22
10.	"Plastic Dreams" (Radio Edit 1997)	Jaydee	3:16
11.	"Want Love" (Original Version)	Hysteric Ego	5:28
12.	"I'm Alive" (Original Mix)	Stretch 'N' Vern	4:43
13.	"Stop" (Stretch 'n' Vern's Rock & Roll Mix)	Spice Girls	3:21
14.	"Let Me Entertain You" (Stretch 'n' Vern's Rock & Roll Mix)	Robbie Williams	4:22
15.	"Keep On Dancin' (Let's Go)" (Dub Brothers Edit)	Perpetual Motion	4:40
16.	"Gotta Keep Pushin'" (12" Original)	Z Factor	4:15
17.	"Insomnia" (Monster Mix Radio Edit)	Faithless	3:35
18.	"Sunchyme" (Radio Mix)	Dario G	3:53
