= WXRI =

- Winston-Salem, North Carolina; United States
- Broadcast area: Piedmont Triad
- Frequency: 91.3 MHz
- Branding: Joy FM Real Music

Programming
- Format: Southern Gospel
- Affiliations: Salem Communications

Ownership
- Owner: Positive Alternative Radio
- Sister stations: WJYJ, WTTX-FM, WTJY

Technical information
- Licensing authority: FCC
- Facility ID: 53100
- Class: C2
- ERP: 50,000 watts
- HAAT: 66.0 meters
- Transmitter coordinates: 36°8′6.00″N 80°30′14.00″W

Links
- Public license information: Public file; LMS
- Webcast: Listen live
- Website: Official website

WXRI (91.3 FM) is a radio station broadcasting a Southern Gospel format. Licensed to Winston-Salem, North Carolina, United States, the station serves the Piedmont Triad area. The station is currently owned by Positive Alternative Radio and features programming from Salem Communications.

It is the flagship station of a network of full-power stations and translators, spilling into parts of six radio markets in four states—the Triad, Charlotte, Roanoke/Lynchburg, the Tri-Cities, Southside Virginia, Harrisonburg/Staunton. The full-power satellites include WTJY 89.5 FM in Asheboro, North Carolina, WJYJ 88.1 FM in Hickory, North Carolina, WTTX-FM in Appomattox, Virginia, WRFE in Chesterfield, South Carolina and WODY in Martinsville, Virginia. Collectively, these stations are known as "Joy FM. Real Music. Real Life."

== History ==
In Spring 1997, WXRI signed on in East Bend, playing such artists as The Perrys and The Gaithers.

In 1999 and 2000, Joy FM of Winston-Salem, also heard on WPIR in 1999 and WTJY by 2000, was named National Southern Gospel Station of the Year by the Southern Gospel Music Association.

In 2010, The Gospel Music Association presented Joy FM with Radio Station of the Year at the Dove Awards, held at the Grand Ole Opry in Nashville, TN.
