= The Joy =

The Joy may refer to:

- The Joy (The Neverclaim album), a 2015 album by The Neverclaim
- "The Joy" (song), a song by Jay-Z and Kanye West from the 2011 album Watch the Throne
- "The Joy" (The Amazing World of Gumball), a television episode
- Mountjoy Prison, a prison in Ireland nicknamed The Joy
- Alias of Metal Gear character The Boss
- The Joy, a South African vocal group
- The Joy, the 2024 debut album by South African vocal group The Joy
