= Sheila Chandra =

English pop singer

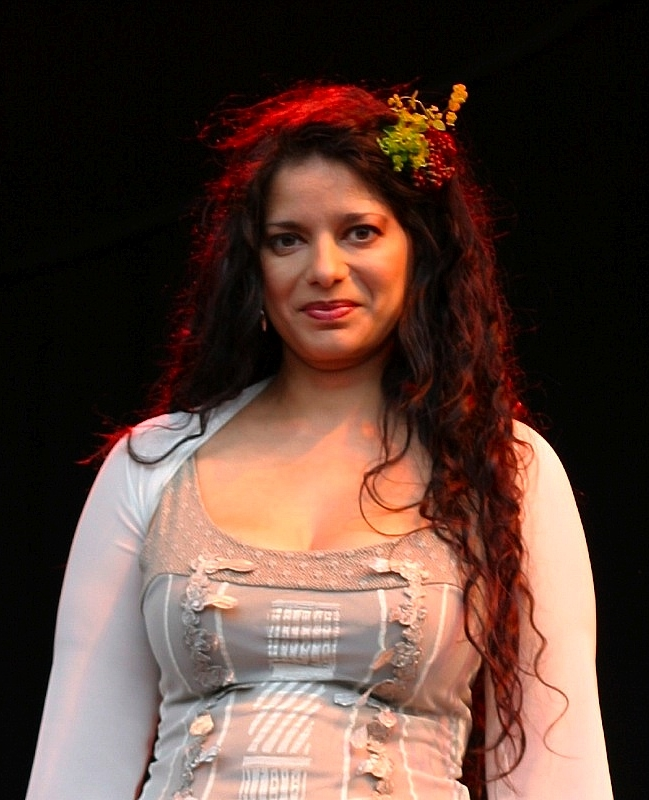
- Chandra at The Big Chill in 2008

Background information
- Born: Sheila Savithri Elizabeth Chandra; 14 April 1965 (age 61)
- Origin: Waterloo, London, England
- Genres: Pop; world fusion; world beat; house
- Occupation: Singer
- Years active: 1981–2009
- Labels: Indipop Records; Phonogram; Mercury/PolyGram Records; Real World Records; Shakti/Narada
- Formerly of: Monsoon
- Website: sheilachandra.com

Sheila Savithri Elizabeth Chandra (born 14 March 1965) is an English writer and retired pop singer and actress of Indian descent. She began her career as an actress in the late 1970s before launching a music career in the early 1980s. Her career ended prematurely in 2009 as a result of burning mouth syndrome.

== Early life ==
Sheila Chandra was born in Waterloo, London, England.

== Career ==
=== Beginnings as an actress ===
Chandra first came to public attention as an actress, playing Sudhamani Patel in the BBC school drama Grange Hill from 1979 to 1981.

=== Indian–Western pop fusion period ===
As a teenager, Chandra formed the band Monsoon with Steve Coe (who became the band's producer) and bassist Martin Smith. Monsoon created a fusion of Western and Indian pop styles. The band recorded its only album Third Eye in 1982 from which it had a hit single, "Ever So Lonely", which peaked at No. 12 in the UK Singles Chart. Monsoon followed up with the single "Shakti," which peaked at No. 41, but this was the band's final charting single. The album also includes a cover of the Beatles' "Tomorrow Never Knows", featuring the distinctive EBow guitar sound of Bill Nelson. Resenting pressure from their record company over musical direction, Monsoon dissolved in 1982 and Coe and Smith set about promoting Chandra as a solo artist on independent Indipop Records.

Chandra went on to release a number of albums in the 1980s, at times experimenting with her voice as an instrument through a range of techniques. After a creative split with Martin Smith, Chandra released three albums on Peter Gabriel's Real World label — Weaving My Ancestors' Voices (1992), The Zen Kiss (1994), and ABoneCroneDrone (1996).

=== Shift to solo voice and drone style ===
In the 1990s Chandra decided, having been a studio artist exclusively, to give concerts for the first time, and concurrently released a trilogy of albums on Peter Gabriel's Real World label. These were in the minimalist solo voice and drone style, which she developed especially for live performances, so that she could perform alone on stage with only the occasional taped drone for accompaniment. Martin Smith was no longer actively involved by this time. Drawing on similarities of structure between Indian ragas and English folk melodies, she started to incorporate many British and Irish traditional songs and techniques, as well as other vocal styles and techniques from around the world.

=== Later projects ===
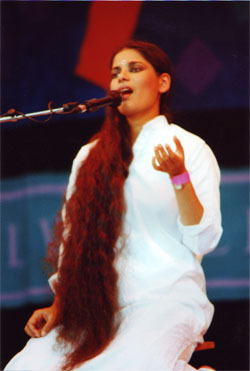
Sheila Chandra singing at WOMAD festival in 1992

In 1990, Chandra interrupted her sabbatical to record a single, "Raining", with the folk-synth band Ancient Beatbox, which also appeared on its self-titled album.

In 1993, Chandra sang with Peter Gabriel onstage at the WOMAD festival in San Francisco.

In 2000, she contributed two tracks, one a cover version of Tim Buckley's "Song to the Siren" and the other a remix of her solo track "Ever So Lonely/Eyes/Ocean" by Stephen Haig, to the album Gifted on Real World Records.

In 2001, she released a collaborative album with the Ganges Orchestra titled This Sentence is True (The Previous Sentence is False) based on her two experimental EPs with that group.

2002 saw the release of a remix of her original hit single "Ever So Lonely" (written by Steve Coe), retitled "So Lonely", by the DJ Jakatta. It charted at No. 8 in the UK. In 2002 she performed a song titled "Breath of Life" (retitled "The Grace of Valar" in its 2006 release) with Howard Shore for The Lord of the Rings: The Two Towers soundtrack.

In 2007, she recorded two songs for Simon Emmerson's project The Imagined Village, which set out to reinterpret traditional British songs using a wide range of contemporary British musicians. She also appeared with the Imagined Village on a concert tour of Britain in 2007.

=== Writing and retirement from music ===
In 2009, Chandra began experiencing symptoms of what was eventually diagnosed as burning mouth syndrome, as a result of which she is unable to sing, speak, laugh or cry without suffering intense pain. She has thus been rendered effectively mute. As a result of her illness Chandra retired from music. She turned her attention to writing self-help books, the first of which, Banish Clutter Forever – How the Toothbrush Principle Will Change Your Life, was published in 2010. She has continued to mentor young artists including the graffiti artist Stik.

== Discography ==
=== Albums ===
==== With Monsoon ====
- Third Eye (1982) (retitled Monsoon featuring Sheila Chandra in 1995)

==== With the Ganges Orchestra ====
- This Sentence is True (The Previous Sentence is False) (2001)
- EEP1 & EEP2 (2012)
- Pure Drones, Vol. I (2013)
- Pure Drones, Vol. II (2013)
- Pure Drones, Vol. III (2013)

==== Solo ====
- Out on My Own (1984)
- Quiet (1984)
- The Struggle (1985)
- Nada Brahma (1985)
- Roots and Wings (1990)
- Silk (compilation, 1991)
- Weaving My Ancestors' Voices (1992)
- The Zen Kiss (1994)
- ABoneCroneDrone (1996)
- Moonsung: A Real World Retrospective (compilation, 1999)
- The Indipop Retrospective (compilation, 2003)
- Archive (compilation, 2013)

=== Singles ===
==== With Monsoon ====
- "Ever So Lonely" (1982)
- "Shakti (The Meaning of Within)" (1982)
- "Tomorrow Never Knows" (1982)
- "Wings of the Dawn (Prem Kavita)" (1982)
- "Ever So Lonely" (Remix by Ben Chapman) (1990)
- "So Lonely" ("Ever So Lonely" remixes by Jakatta) (2002)

=== Other ===
==== Solo ====
- "Raining (My Eyes Are Filled with Clouds)" with Ancient Beatbox (1990)
- "Breath of Life" in The Lord of the Rings: The Two Towers (2002)
- "Arwen's Fate" in The Lord of the Rings: The Two Towers (2002)
- "Welcome Sailor" and "'Ouses, 'Ouses, 'Ouses" from The Imagined Village (2007)

== Bibliography ==
- Banish Clutter Forever – How the Toothbrush Principle Will Change Your Life (2010) ISBN 978-0-09-193502-3
- Organizing Your Creative Career: How to Channel Your Creativity Into Career Success (2017) ISBN 978-1786780225

== Interviews ==
- Mathur, Rakesh (1991). Nada Brahma; DEVI in Hinduism Today, August 1991
- Schaefer, John (1993). Sheila Chandra's Interview with John Schaefer at WNYC 1993: Weaving My Ancestors' Voices
- Schaefer, John (1996). Sheila Chandra's Interview with John Schaefer at WNYC 1996: ABoneCroneDrone
- Prasad, Anil (2000). Sheila Chandra: Natural Extensions in Innerviews, 3 May 2000
- Joe F. Compton (2000). "The Commonality is Brilliance..."
- Mite (2000). Sheila Chandra Interview in Mutant Renegade Zine No. 13, Winter 2000
- Teropong (2008). Sheila Chandra in Womad Singapore, 23 August 2008
- Millard, Rosie (2010). Another Fine Mess You've Got Me Out Of at Times Online
- Weaver, Andrew (2012). Peter Gabriel's Real World Records: interviews with Sheila Chandra, the Blind Boys of Alabama, Thomas Mapfumo and Yungchen Lhamo on cbcmusic.ca
- Prasad, Anil (2020). Sheila Chandra: State of Flow in Innerviews, 16 December 2020
