= Evian =

French brand of mineral water

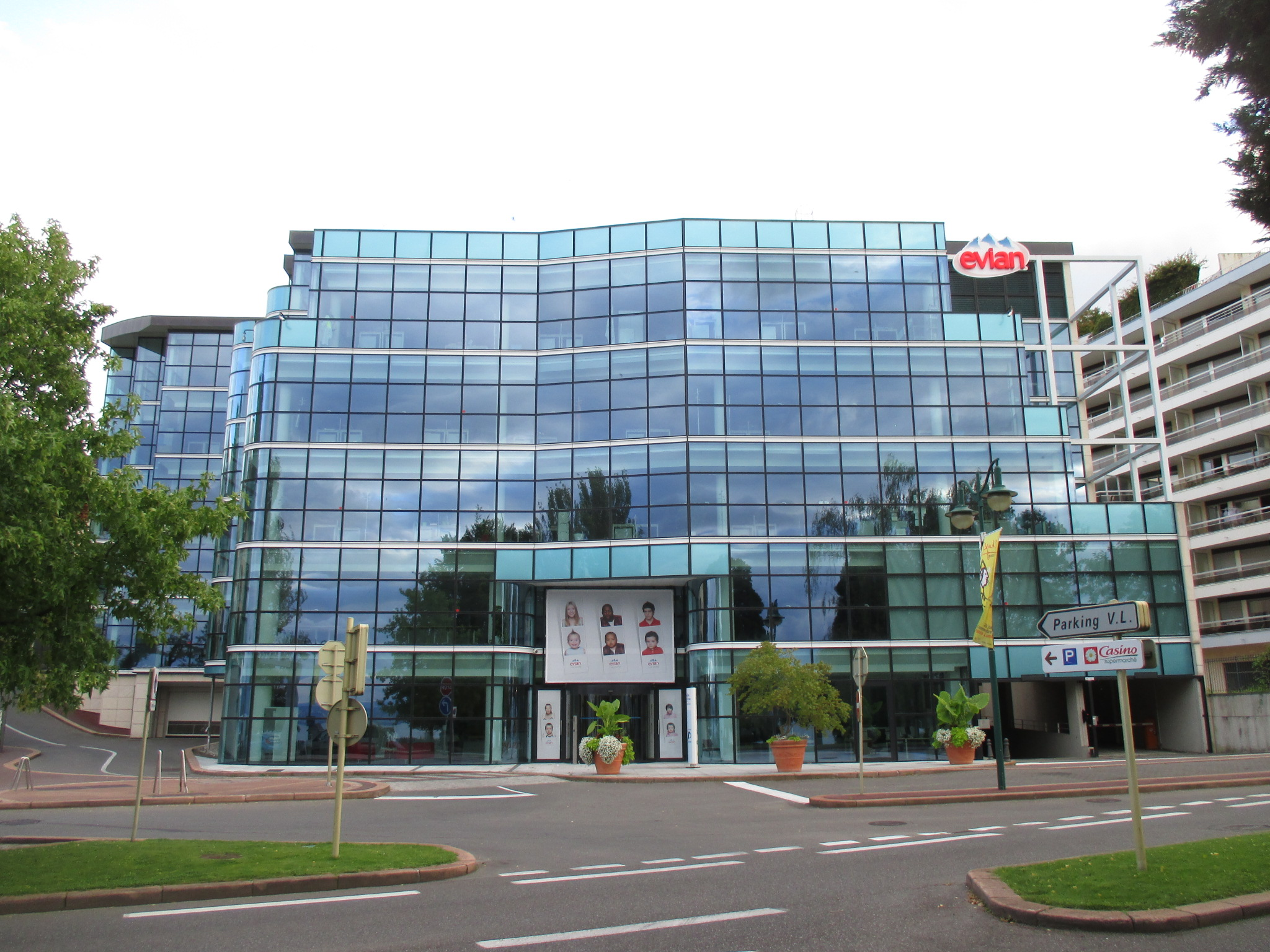
- Headquarters in 2014
- Industry: Beverage
- Founded: 1826; 200 years ago as "Société des Eaux Minérales"
- Headquarters: Évian-les-Bains, France
- Area served: Europe, North America, Asia, Oceania
- Products: Bottled water
- Parent: Danone
- Website: evian.com

Evian or Évian (UK: /ˈɛviɒ̃/, US: /ˌeɪviˈɒn/; French: [evjɑ̃]; stylized as evian) is a French brand that bottles mineral water from several sources near Évian-les-Bains, on the south shore of Lake Geneva.

Evian is owned by Danone, a French multinational corporation. In addition to the mineral water, Danone Group uses the Evian name for a line of organic skin care products and a luxury resort in Évian-les-Bains.

== History ==
The origin of Evian can be traced to 1826, when the Societe des Eaux Minerales mineral water company was founded. Evian first became a public company in 1859 as the "Société anonyme des eaux minérales de Cachat" and a year later it became French when Savoy was incorporated into France under the Treaty of Turin. The French Ministry of Health reauthorized the bottling of Cachat water on the recommendation of the Medicine Academy in 1878. In 1908, Evian water began to be sold in glass bottles manufactured by the glass factory Souchon-Neuvesel, which today is a part of Owens-Illinois. The first PVC bottle was launched in 1969.

During the following year, the BSN Group, which eventually became the Danone Group, took 100% control of the Évian brand. Evian entered the U.S. market in 1978. In 1995, Evian switched to collapsible polyethylene terephthalate (PET) bottles.

== Production ==
Nutritional info
- Source: Évian-les-Bains
- Type: Still
- pH: 7.2
- Calcium (Ca): 80
- Chloride (Cl): 6.8
- Magnesium (Mg): 26
- Potassium (K): 1
- Sodium (Na): 6.5
- TDS: 300
- All concentrations in milligrams per liter (mg/L); pH without units

Evian's site in the French Alps was, during 2015, the largest carbon-neutral food and beverage production site in France.

== Public perception, marketing and advertising ==
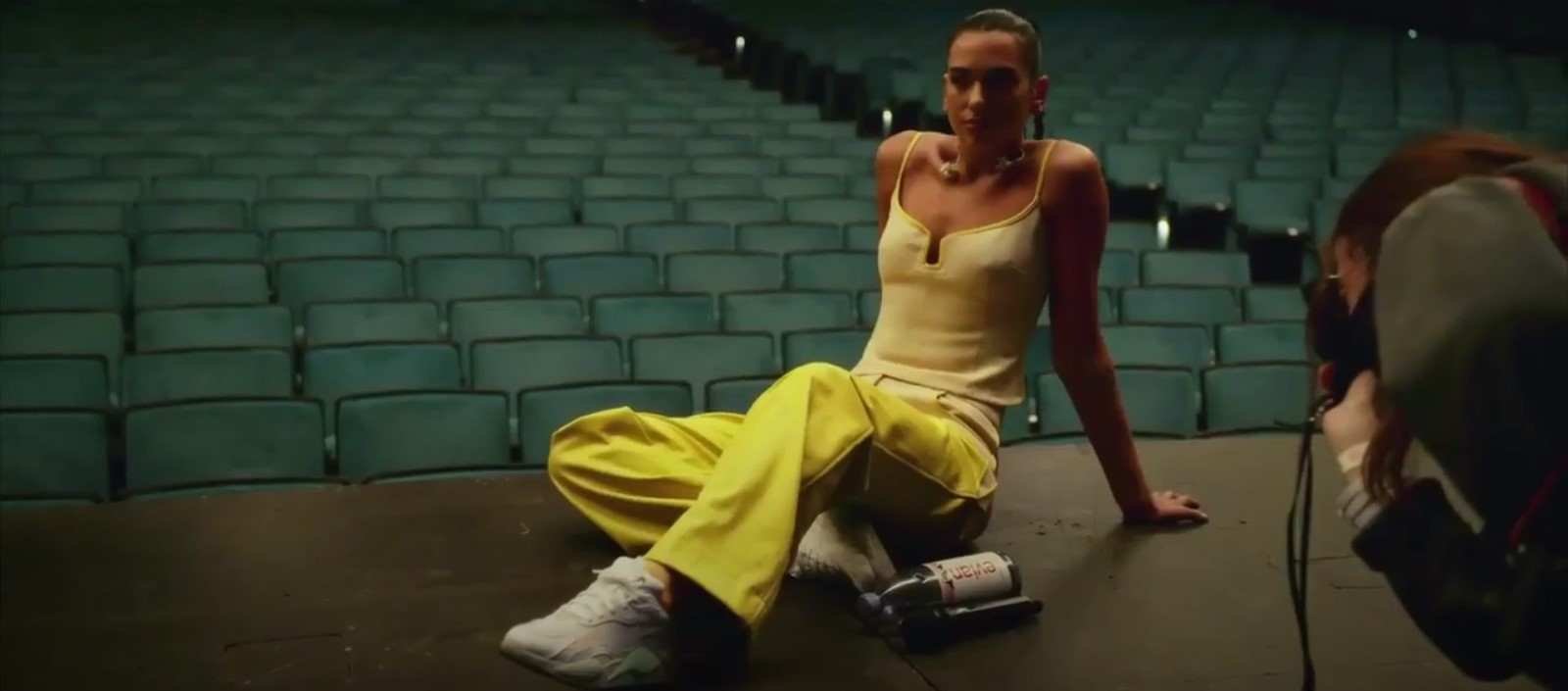
Singer-songwriter Dua Lipa with an Evian bottle

Evian has sought to portray itself as popular among Hollywood celebrities. The brand frequently collaborates with high-fashion designers to produce limited edition bottles. Diane von Fürstenberg designed the limited edition bottle for 2013, Elie Saab for 2014, Kenzo for 2015, Alexander Wang for 2016, Christian Lacroix for 2017, Chiara Ferragni for 2018, Virgil Abloh for 2019 and 2020, Moncler for 2021, and Balmain for 2022.

Evian worked with Virgin Records and EMI in 1998 for the mix album Club Nation. The album featured many advertisements for Évian, including a logo on the cover, six full pages in the booklet, the image of a bottle of Évian on CD1 and a crushed bottle of Évian on CD2.

In 2009, Evian launched the advertisement campaign, "Evian Roller Babies". The campaign won a Gold Award at the London International Awards 2009 for Best Visual Effects.

Evian brand ambassadors include singer Dua Lipa and tennis player Emma Raducanu.

In 2023, Evian collaborated with Balmain for a high fashion collection entitled, “Balmain X Evian”.

== Environmentalism ==
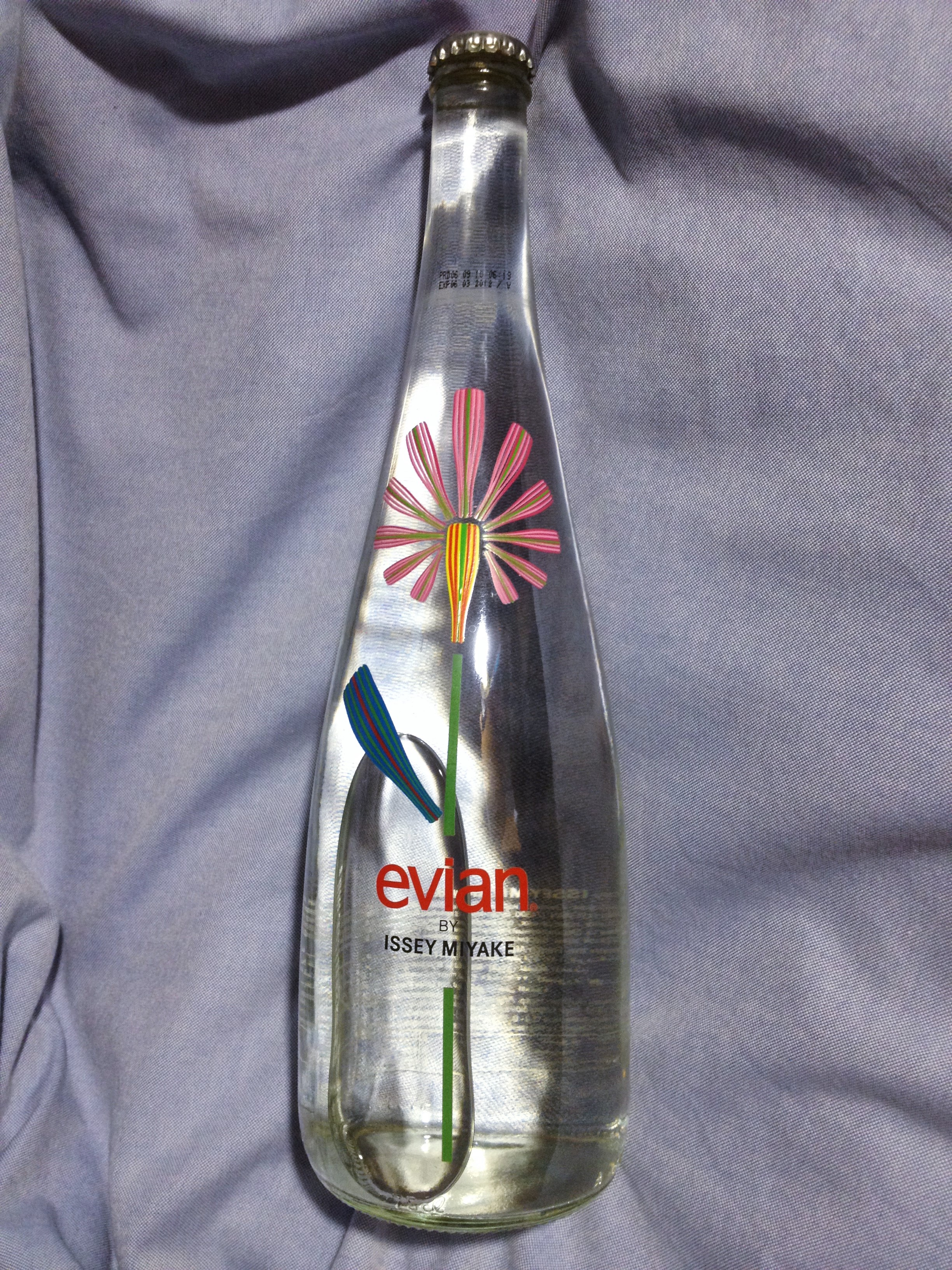
A glass Evian bottle designed by Issey Miyake

In April 2008, Evian created the Evian Water Protection Institute to work on three water and wetlands management projects with the Ramsar Convention. The three areas where the projects will take place are Thailand's Bung Khong, the La Plata Basin in Argentina and the Jagdishpur Reservoir in Nepal. Evian has also cut energy and water use by incorporating post-consumer recycled PET plastic into the bottle sizes that receive the most sales. The company has joined with Recyclebank to promote recycling.

During 2018, Evian announced that it would make all of its plastic bottles from 100% recycled plastic by 2025.

During April 2020, Evian claimed to have achieved carbon neutrality. In October 2022, a class action lawsuit was filed by plaintiff Stephanie Dorris on behalf of consumers of Evian water, alleging that the claim of carbon neutrality was false and misleading. In January 2024, US District Judge Nelson S. Román ruled that the class action lawsuit could proceed, calling carbon neutral an ambiguous term that may reasonably confuse consumers and saying that Danone "expects too much" for consumers to learn what the term means from Evian labels. In response, lawyers for Danone argued that it is unreasonable for consumers to assume that the product "magically arrived from the French Alps to their homes without the emission of even a molecule of carbon dioxide."
