= Erin Lordan =

British singer and dancer (1963–2005)

- Born: Erin Jane Lordan; 8 November 1963
- Died: 26 February 2005 (aged 41)
- Genres: Dance, house, trance, rave
- Occupations: Dancer; singer; actress

Erin Lordan (8 November 1963 – 26 February 2005) was a British singer and dancer who had hits in the UK with BBG, Bamboo, Ascension and Shut Up and Dance. She was a member of the dance troupe Hot Gossip. Erin was also "The Bride" in the Elton John video "Kiss the Bride". Lordan died of cancer on 26 February 2005.

== Discography ==
- "What's a Girl Gotta Do" (unreleased, 1981)
- "The Art of Moving Butts" (with Shut Up and Dance, 1992) – UK No. 69
- "Let the Music Play" (with BBG, 1996) – UK No. 46
- "The Strutt" (with Bamboo, 1998) – UK No. 36
- "For a Lifetime" (with Ascension, 2002) – UK No. 45
