= Joye =

Joye is a name primarily used as a surname, but also as a given name. Notable people with the name include:

== Given name ==
- Joye Hummel (1924–2021), American comics writer
- Joye Estazie (born 1984), Mauritian footballer
- Soara-Joye Ross, American actress and singer

== Surname ==
- Gilles Joye (1424 or 1425–1483), Franco-Flemish composer
- George Joye (c. 1495 – 1553), English Bible translator
- John Joye (fl. 1584), English politician
- Prudent Joye (1913–1980), French athlete
- Col Joye (1937–2025), Australian rock musician
- Samantha Joye (born 1965), American oceanographer
- Dan Joye (born 1985), Venezuelan-American luger

== See also ==
- Joy (disambiguation)
- Joyes (disambiguation)
