= WJYJ =

- Hickory, North Carolina; United States
- Frequency: 88.1 MHz

Programming
- Format: Southern Gospel

Ownership
- Owner: Positive Alternative Radio, Inc.

History
- Former call signs: WUDD (11/19/1984 - 12/27/1984); WPAR (12/27/1984 - 07/11/1997); WPIR (07/11/1997 - 02/13/2018)

Technical information
- Licensing authority: FCC
- Facility ID: 53091
- Class: C2
- ERP: 26,500 watts
- HAAT: 77.0 meters
- Transmitter coordinates: 35°43′34.00″N 81°8′52.00″W

Links
- Public license information: Public file; LMS
- Website: joyfm.org

WJYJ (88.1 FM) is a radio station broadcasting a Southern Gospel format. Licensed to Hickory, North Carolina, United States, the station is currently owned by Positive Alternative Radio, Inc.

The station uses the identifier of "Joy FM". It has a number of repeater frequencies located as far north as Kentucky.

== History ==
This station signed on in Claremont, North Carolina on November 19, 1984 as WUDD, later on December 27, of that same year, 1984, they changed to WPAR, with a Contemporary Christian music format.

In 1989, Don Lee was general manager of WPAR and WCXN, which played Southern gospel music.

In August 1993, DJ and area minister Robert Barnette was one of the top five DJs at medium-market Southern gospel stations, according to The Singing News Magazine, and he was up for top DJ nationwide. At the time, WPAR sponsored gospel singing evenings which sold out.

In 1999 and 2000, Joy FM of Winston-Salem, also heard on WXRI and WTJY, was named National Southern Gospel Station of the Year by the Southern Gospel Music Association.

On February 13, 2018, Baker Family Stations and Positive Alternative Radio swapped the long-time callsign for their Fredericksburg, VA station, WJYJ, with the callsign for their Hickory, NC station, WPIR.
