= Third Eye (Monsoon album) =

Studio album by Monsoon
- Released: 1983
- Recorded: 1982
- Genre: New pop; new wave; Indian pop; raga rock; progressive pop
- Length: 39:06
- Label: The Mobile Suit Corporation; Mercury/PolyGram Records (reissue)
- Producer: Hugh Jones and Steve Coe

Singles from Third Eye
- 1. "Ever So Lonely"; 2. "Shakti (The Meaning Within)"; 3. "Tomorrow Never Knows"; 4. "Wings of the Dawn (Prem Kavita)"

Professional ratings
Review scores
| Source | Rating |
|---|---|
| AllMusic | 4.5/5 stars |

Third Eye is the sole studio album by British band Monsoon.

== Track listing ==
=== Third Eye (original release) ===
1. "Wings of the Dawn (Prem Kavita)" (Steve Coe, Martin Smith, Jhalib) – 3:56
2. "Tomorrow Never Knows" (John Lennon, Paul McCartney) – 4:01
3. "Third Eye and Tikka T.V." (Coe) – 2:53
4. "Eyes" (Coe, Smith) – 3:41
5. "Shakti (The Meaning of Within)" (Coe) – 4:04
6. "Ever So Lonely" (Coe) – 6:12
7. "You Can't Take Me with You" (Coe, Smith) – 3:04
8. "And I You" (Coe) – 3:28
9. "Kashmir" (Coe, Smith) – 4:00
10. "Watchers of the Night" (Coe, Smith) – 3:47

=== Monsoon featuring Sheila Chandra ===
In 1995, the album was re-released under the above title with the following extra tracks:

1. "Indian Princess" – 3:20
2. "Sunset over the Ganges" – 3:16
3. "Ever So Lonely (Hindi Version)" – 5:55
4. "Wings of the Dawn (Prem Kavita) (Hindi Version)" – 4:02
5. "Ever So Lonely (Ben Chapman Remix)" – 6:24
6. "Ever So Lonely (Ben Chapman Instrumental Remix)" – 6:21

=== Third Eye (deluxe reissue) ===
The album was released again in 2022, under its original title, with the additional tracks from the 1995 release and the following further additional tracks:

1. "Man Who Makes Time"
2. "With Your Love"
3. "Ever So Lonely (EP version 1981)"
4. "Mirror of your Mind"
5. "Shout 'til you're Heard"
6. "Ever So Lonely (Ben Chapman 7" Remix)"
7. "Ever So Lonely (Ben Chapman 7" Instrumental Remix)"
8. "Ever So Lonely (Capital Radio Session March 1982)"
9. "Sunset Over the Ganges (Capital Radio Session March 1982)"
10. "Shakti (The Meaning of Within) (Capital Radio Session March 1982)"
11. "Shout 'til you're Heard (Capital Radio Session March 1982)"
12. "Shakti (The Meaning of Within) (12" version)"
13. "Ever So Lonely (Dub version)"
14. "And I You (edit)"
15. "Wings of the Dawn (Prem Kavita) (7" version)"
16. "Tomorrow Never Knows (7" version)"
17. "Ever So Lonely (7" version)"
18. "Ever So Lonely (edit)"

== Personnel ==
- Sheila Chandra – lead vocal, backing vocals
- Steve Coe – pianos, celeste, swarmandel, gong, organ, cabasa, backing vocals
- Martin Smith – 8-string bass guitar, 4-string bass guitar, accordion, tamboura, piano, sitar, tabla, ektara, backing vocals

with

- Dari Mankoo – sitar
- Clem Alford – sitar
- Jhalib – tabla, Indian percussion

Guest musicians

- Dinesh – tabla
- Preston Heyman – ghatam, gamelan, timbali, gong, cowbell, rototoms, tom-toms, wasp, tambourines, cabasa, fire extinguisher
- Bill Nelson – electric guitars
- Paul James – shenai, pipes, recorders
- Cliff Stapleton – hurdy-gurdy

on "Kashmir"

- Richard Bragg – mandolin
- Norman Bragg – mandolin
- Deepak Khazanchi – santoor
- Chris Hunter – flute
- Punita Gupta – sitar

on "Tomorrow Never Knows"

- Dave Balfe – synthesizer
- Merrick – drums

== Recording ==
Recorded at Rockfield Studios, Wales
Additional recording and mixing at Sarm Studios, London

- Hugh Jones and Steve Coe – producer
- Hugh Jones – engineer
- Stuart Bruce – assistant engineer (Sarm Studios)
- Julian Mendelsohn – assistant engineer (Sarm Studios)

== Release history ==
| Region | Date | Label | Format | Catalog |
|---|---|---|---|---|
| United Kingdom | 1983 | The Mobile Suit Corporation | stereo LP | MOBIL 1 |
| United Kingdom | 1983 | Great Expectations | LP | PIPLP 001 |
| Netherlands | 1983 | Mercury/PolyGram | LP | 812 897-1 |
| France | 1988 | Great Expectations | CD | PIPCD 001 |
| United States | 1995 | Mercury/PolyGram | CD as Monsoon featuring Sheila Chandra | 526 527-2 |
| United Kingdom | 2022 | Cherry Pop | CD | CRPOPD237 |
