= Dave Lee (DJ) =

British DJ and house music producer/remixer

David Lee
- Also known as: Jakatta, Joey Negro, Doug Willis, Sunburst Band, Akabu, Sessomatto, Z Factor, Mistura, Hed Boys, Prospect Park, Foreal People, Kola Kube, Energize, Agora, Swingtime De, Raw Essence, AC Soul Symphony
- Born: David Russell Lee; 18 June 1964 (age 62); Isle of Wight, England
- Genres: Disco, house
- Occupations: DJ, producer
- Years active: 1988–present
- Label: Z-Records

David Russell Lee (born 18 June 1964) is an English DJ and music producer, formerly known by the stage name Joey Negro, which he retired in July 2020 following the George Floyd protests.

He has released music under a variety of pseudonyms, including Jakatta, Doug Willis, Raven Maize, and Sessomatto. He was also a part of the Sunburst Band. Lee has had some top 40 hits, among them "American Dream", "So Lonely" and "My Vision", all under the name Jakatta.

== Biography ==
=== Early life ===
Lee was born on the Isle of Wight, but raised in Thorpe-le-Soken in Essex. His mother was the novelist Maureen Lee.

=== Career ===
Dave Lee's interest in dance music began with collecting disco, soul and funk records in the late 1970s. In 1986, he got his first job in the industry, working at the short-lived store Smithers & Leigh. He moved over to Rough Trade, who were then setting up a dance division, Demix, and were looking for someone to run it. Within a short period of time, Demix was handling hits for Bomb the Bass, MARRS and Beatmasters. Less than a year later, Lee, in partnership with Rough Trade, set up his own label, Republic Records, which became known both for the series of compilation albums, The Garage Sound of Deepest New York, as well Lee's own early forays into studio production.

By the end of 1987, Lee began working in a Clacton-on-Sea studio with former schoolfriend Mike Cheal (real name Emmanuel Cheal) and another Smithers & Leigh employee, DJ Mark Ryder. The trio were responsible for the first release on Republic, under the name M-D-Emm: "Get Busy (It's Partytime!)". Two further M-D-Emm singles were released on Republic. Mike and Dave recorded the acid house songs "1666" and "Get Acidic" together without Mark, and continued the same partnership using other aliases, notably Masters of the Universe, Mystique, Kikkit and The Shy Boys. In 1989, Dave Lee, Mike Cheal and Mark Ryder broke through the underground with a club hit under the assumed name Raven Maize, which made use of disco samples, something Lee has returned to repeatedly over the course of his career.

In 1990, Lee's most enduring pseudonym made its debut, when he released Joey Negro's first single via New York indie house music label Nu Groove, with his new name a homage to Pal Joey and J. Walter Negro. After the single's success, Lee went totally solo allowing him the total freedom to explore his own musical direction. When the single "Do It, Believe It" was released in the UK, it was also the debut release on his own self-financed label Z Records, which remains his primary outlet. Around the same time, Lee met keyboard player Andrew 'Doc' Livingstone when he sent in a demo to Republic Records. Shortly after, the pair decamped to Unit 3 Studios in Chalk Farm.

In 1991, Rough Trade Records went into liquidation and with it, Lee's job. The slack was taken up by increasingly large numbers of studio commissions as his work as a remixer grew.

In 1993, Lee was approached by boy band Take That's label with a view to working together. Although the Dan Hartman song "Relight My Fire" had never been a hit in the UK, it had become a popular club track in the house music scene, so at Lee's suggestion they covered it, with Lulu taking the cameo role that Loleatta Holloway had performed on the original. It became the boy band's second number one in the UK. The same year saw the release of the Joey Negro album Universe of Love, featuring Gwen Guthrie and the Trammps. Its title track, with live instrumentation, prefigured much of the work he went on to do with the Sunburst Band.

Lee's stock as a remixer continued to rise throughout the '90s, providing remixes for Diana Ross, M People and Pet Shop Boys, as well as racking up further aliases (Z Factor, Doug Willis, Akabu, Sessomatto and Agora). In 1997, Lee met Taka Boom, Chaka Khan's sister, when she relocated to the UK, and the pair collaborated on "Surrender" and "Can't Get High Without U". The same year, the Sunburst Band released their debut EP, Sunburn, which included "Garden of Love", one of the band's most successful songs. Lee opted to gather many of the session musicians he worked with over the years – among them Michele Chiavarini, Viv Hope-Scott, Jessica Lauren and Tony Remy – who recorded the first album, Here Comes the Sunburst Band. It was a conscious departure from electronic music and, as Lee admitted in an interview, it was his commercial successes elsewhere that provided the finances to make such a move.

The follow-up, 2005's Until the End of Time, introduced two new vocal collaborators, disco stylist Linda Clifford and former Chic frontwoman Norma Jean Wright, as well as Taka Boom, and received critical plaudits: a remix of "Every Day", "Everydub", was included on Heston Blumenthal's Desert Island Discs. On the third album, Moving with the Shakers, Lee brought Leroy Burgess and Diane Charlemagne (vocalist on Goldie's hit "Inner City Life") into his ever-evolving band. The most recent album, The Secret Life of Us, was released in 2012. All four albums were released on Lee's own Z Records imprint, which has been the outlet for the majority of his work since the collapse of Republic Records.

By the end of the 1990s, Z had released around 40 singles, the overwhelming majority coming from Lee's own studio; but over the past decade, the label has featured more outside producers and remixers, including Dennis Ferrer, Henrik Schwarz, Ame and Motor City Drum Ensemble, as well as providing an outlet for Lee's esoteric compilation series. Z Records has now passed 200 releases. Lee's deep house project Akabu, which has been remixed by Deetron, Spiritcatcher and Lovebirds, also won plaudits from industry veterans such as Carl Craig when the album was released in 2010.

Lee's first brush with the higher echelons of the top 40 came in 1999 when TV series Ibiza Uncovered used a portion of Z Factor's "Gotta Keep Pushin'" as its theme. Lee reworked the song, with Taka Boom on vocals, and re-released it as "Must Be the Music" (as Joey Negro). The song eventually peaked at number 8.

The following year in 2000, Lee scored an unlikely hit with an underground smash called "American Booty", sampling two Thomas Newman pieces ("Dead Already" and "American Beauty/Paper Bag") from the soundtrack for the film American Beauty. It was eventually reworked with added vocals from Swati Nektar using the Jakatta alias, and released as "American Dream", delivering the biggest hit of Lee's career (UK No. 3). It was swiftly followed by two further top ten hits for Jakatta with "So Lonely" (featuring Monsoon) (UK No. 8) and the Seal collaboration "My Vision" (UK No. 6). The resulting Jakatta album also climbed to number 12 in the charts. The same year he delivered a stunning remix of Inner City's 'Good Love'.

In 2001, Lee resurrected his Raven Maize alias for one of the Ibiza summer hits: "The Real Life". Inspired by the Corporation of One original, Lee used both "Bohemian Rhapsody" and Simple Minds' "Theme from Great Cities", and the record reached number 12 (UK).

It was in 2005 still under the alias Joey Negro, when he teamed up with Taka Boom again, he delivered one of his biggest mainstream hits to date "Make A Move On Me" (Vocal Club Mix) which reached No. 11 in UK, and was a dancefloor hit across the Greek and Balearic party islands. This really put him on the map with new fans in the funky house scene made popular by brands such as Hed Kandi. Due to popularity, it was signed to numerous record labels including Data, Z Records, Ministry of Sound, Oxyd and Vendetta. The track was previously unreleased under his alias Z-Factor in 2000.

Lee's other project is as a music compiler. Beginning with the Republic compilations The Garage Sound of Deepest New York, he has since compiled over 20 albums, usually featuring rare disco, and club music. During the 1990s, he was behind the Jumpin' series of compilations released by Harmless Records, which collected together influential and sampled disco tracks, while Disco Spectrum, which ran to three volumes on Barely Breaking Even, assembled disco songs that had never been reissued before. Lee, with longtime associate Sean P, was also responsible for the Disco Not Disco series on Strut Records that gathered together a collection of songs by artists such as Yoko Ono, Can and jazz trumpeter Don Cherry. Subsequent to these, he has continued to run various series on his own label Z Records, including Soul of Disco, Back Street Brit Funk, Italo House and Go Go Get Down, all focusing on forgotten areas of dance music history.

Lee continues to release house and other disco-influenced styles on his own label Z Records, as well as DJing regularly in the UK and around the world.

Lee dropped the name Joey Negro on 21 July 2020 in light of the Black Lives Matter movement, one day after the Blessed Madonna changed her moniker from the Black Madonna. Lee stated that he had "not felt comfortable with the name Joey Negro for a while, especially as I've got older".

== Discography ==
- Universe of Love (1993)
- Get Down Tonight (1997)
- Here Comes the Sunburst Band (1998)
- Can't Get High Without U (1999)
- Back to the Scene of the Crime (2001)
- Visions (2002)
- 2002 Visions: The Remixes (2002)
- Until the End of Time (2004)
- Moving with the Shakers (2008)
- Doug's Disco Brain (2008)
- The Sunburst Band - The Remixes (2009)
- The Phuture Ain't What It Used to Be (2010)
- The Phuture: Remixed (2010)
- The Secret Life of Us (2012)
- Remixed with Love Volume 1 (2013)
- The Mystery of Mistura (2013)
- Italo House (2014)
- Remixed with Love Volume 2 (2016)
- Produced with Love (2017)
- Remixed with Love Volume 3 (2018)
- Produced with Love II (2022)
- Metamorphosis (2023)
- London / Detroit (2025)

== See also ==
- List of number-one dance hits (United States) - 1998, 2006
- List of artists who reached number one on the U.S. dance chart
