= Paul Rodzianko =

Russian and British Army colonel, cavalry officer, and equestrian author (1880–1956)

- Павел Павлович Родзянко
- Born: 1880
- Died: 1956 (aged 75–76)
- Military career
- Allegiance: Russian Empire → United Kingdom
- Branch: Imperial Russian Army; British Army
- Service years: c. 1900–1917 (Russia); 1920s–1940s (Britain)
- Rank: Colonel
- Unit: Chevalier Guard Regiment
- Conflicts: World War I Russian Civil War; World War II (advisory role)
- Awards: Order of St. Anna, 2nd & 3rd Class; Order of St. Vladimir, 3rd & 4th Class; Order of St. Stanislaus, 2nd Class; Companion of the Order of St Michael and St George (CMG)

Paul Rodzianko (Russian: Павел Павлович Родзянко; 1880–1956) was a Russian cavalry officer, soldier, and later a British Army colonel. He served in the Imperial Russian Army during the First World War, fought with the White movement in the Russian Civil War, and after emigration continued his military service with Britain. He later became known for his equestrian writings and for his work as an instructor in Ireland.

== Family background ==
Rodzianko was a member of the prominent Rodzianko family of Ukrainian-Polish origin. The family belonged to the landed nobility of the Russian Empire and produced several statesmen and military officers. His uncle, Mikhail Rodzianko, served as chairman of the State Duma in the years leading up to the Russian Revolution.

== Military career ==
Paul Rodzianko was born in 1880. Around 1900 he was commissioned into the Imperial Russian Army and assigned to the elite Chevalier Guard Regiment. In 1911 he published a pamphlet on Italian cavalry methods, reflecting the influence of Federico Caprilli's forward-seat system.

During the First World War, Rodzianko rose to the rank of colonel and served on the Eastern Front. He took part in the campaigns in East Prussia and Galicia in 1914 and later fought on the Southwestern Front.

After the February Revolution of 1917, Rodzianko remained in service under the Russian Provisional Government. Following the Bolshevik seizure of power, he joined the White movement and was sent abroad on diplomatic and liaison missions aimed at securing Allied support.

After the defeat of the White armies, Rodzianko went into exile and eventually settled in Britain. In the 1920s he received the honorary rank of colonel in the British Army and was invited to Ireland to assist in the establishment of the Irish Army Equitation School.

== Later life and death ==
Rodzianko lived in Britain during and after the Second World War and remained active in émigré and military circles until his death in 1956.

== Role in the fate of Joy ==
Rodzianko became associated with the fate of Joy, cocker spaniel owned by Alexei Nikolaevich, Tsarevich of Russia. After the execution of the Imperial family in 1918, the dog survived and was later taken abroad by Rodzianko, eventually living in Britain.

== Publications ==
- Modern Horsemanship (London: Seeley Service, 1936–37).
- Tattered Banners: An Autobiography (London: Seeley Service, 1939).
- Mannerheim: An Intimate Picture of a Great Soldier and Statesman (London: Jarrolds, 1940).

== Decorations and honors ==
- Order of St. Anna, 2nd and 3rd Class
- Order of St. Vladimir, 3rd and 4th Class
- Order of St. Stanislaus, 2nd Class
- Companion of the Order of St Michael and St George (CMG)
