= Joy, West Virginia =

- Unincorporated community
- Location within the state of West Virginia Joy (the United States)
- Coordinates: 39°13′58″N 80°52′43″W
- Country: United States
- State: West Virginia
- County: Doddridge
- Elevation: 823 ft (251 m)
- Time zone: UTC-5 (Eastern (EST))
  - Summer (DST): UTC-4 (EDT)
- GNIS ID: 1549765

Joy is an unincorporated community in Doddridge County, West Virginia, United States.
