= Bamboogie =

1998 single by Bamboo

Single by Bamboo
- B-side: "Vegas"
- Released: 5 January 1998
- Length: 7:48 (12-inch vocal mix); 3:33 (radio edit)
- Label: VC; Virgin
- Songwriters: H. W. Casey; Rick Finch
- Producers: Andrew Livingstone; S. Marks

Bamboo singles chronology
"Bamboogie" (1998)	"The Strutt" (1998)

Music video
- "Bamboogie" on YouTube

"Bamboogie" is a song by short-lived British house production act Bamboo. It heavily samples the song "Get Down Tonight" by KC and the Sunshine Band, a US number-one hit in 1975. Following airplay exposure in December 1997, "Bamboogie" was released in the United Kingdom on 5 January 1998.

Upon its release, "Bamboogie" debuted and peaked at No. 2 on the UK Singles Chart on 11 January 1998, behind "Never Ever" by All Saints. According to the Official Charts Company, "Never Ever" beat "Bamboogie" to the top spot by 557 copies. Over the next few months, the single reached the top 10 in Finland, Iceland, Ireland, Italy, and New Zealand. The music video for "Bamboogie" is a compilation of vintage cartoon footage.

== Critical reception ==
Chris Finan from Music Week's RM Dance Update gave "Bamboogie" four out of five, describing it as "a happy cheeky disco moment that first appeared on a Bud Ice TV commercial and now due for release. Very commercially aimed without doubt in its original form, but added more club leverage from the excellent Lisa Marie Experience and the more than capable Graeme Park. More likely to do well over the coming festive period for its feelgood factor."

== Track listings ==
- UK, Australian, and Japanese CD single
1. "Bamboogie" (radio edit) – 3:33
2. "Bamboogie" (Lisa Marie Vocal Experience remix) – 7:44
3. "Bamboogie" (12-inch vocal mix) – 7:48
4. "Vegas" – 5:45
- UK cassette single
1. "Bamboogie" (radio edit) – 3:33
2. "Bamboogie" (12-inch vocal mix) – 7:48
3. "Vegas" – 6:05
- European CD single
1. "Bamboogie" (radio edit) – 3:33
2. "Vegas" – 5:45
- French CD single
1. "Bamboogie" (radio edit) – 3:33
2. "Bamboogie" (12-inch vocal mix) – 7:48

== Charts ==
=== Weekly charts ===
Chart (1998)	Peak position
Australia (ARIA)	29
Austria (Ö3 Austria Top 40)	31
Belgium (Ultratop 50 Flanders)	27
Belgium (Ultratop 50 Wallonia)	39
Europe (Eurochart Hot 100)	10
Finland (Suomen virallinen lista)	10
France (SNEP)	31
Iceland (Íslenski Listinn Topp 40)	7
Ireland (IRMA)	7
Italy (Musica e dischi)	7
New Zealand (Recorded Music NZ)	10
Scotland Singles (OCC)	2
Sweden (Sverigetopplistan)	48
UK Singles (OCC)	2
UK Dance (OCC)	3

=== Year-end charts ===
Chart (1997)	Position
UK Club Chart (Music Week)	12

Chart (1998)	Position
Europe (Eurochart Hot 100)	98
UK Singles (OCC)	64

== Certifications ==
Region	Certification	Certified units/sales
United Kingdom (BPI)	Silver	200,000^{^}
^{^} Shipments figures based on certification alone.

== Release history ==
Region	Date	Format(s)	Label(s)	Ref.
United Kingdom	5 January 1998	12-inch vinyl; CD; cassette	VC; Virgin	
Japan	20 May 1998	CD	VC	
