= WTTX-FM =

- Appomattox, Virginia; United States
- Broadcast area: Appomattox County
- Frequency: 107.1 MHz
- Branding: Joy FM

Programming
- Format: Southern Gospel

Ownership
- Owner: Baker Family Stations; (Positive Alternative Radio, Inc.)
- Sister stations: WXRI

History
- First air date: 1974

Technical information
- Licensing authority: FCC
- Facility ID: 12061
- Class: A
- Power: 1,700 Watts
- HAAT: 130 meters (430 ft)
- Transmitter coordinates: 37°22′19.0″N 78°50′6.0″W
- Translator: See § Translators

Links
- Public license information: Public file; LMS
- Webcast: WTTX-FM Webstream
- Website: WTTX-FM Online

WTTX-FM (107.1 MHz) is a non-commercial radio station licensed to Appomattox, Virginia, serving Appomattox County. It airs a Southern Gospel radio format, simulcast from WXRI Winston-Salem, as part of the Joy FM network. WTTX-FM is owned and operated by Baker Family Stations with the license held by Positive Alternative Radio, Inc.

== Translators ==
In addition to the main station, WTTX-FM is relayed by FM translators to widen its broadcast area.

Broadcast translators for WTTX-FM
Call sign	Frequency	City of license	FID	ERP (W)	HAAT	Class	FCC info
W242CL	(96.3 FM) FM	Charlottesville, Virginia	18866	10 watts	316 m (1,037 ft)	D	LMS
W247CQ	(97.3 FM) FM	Lynchburg, Virginia	79178	10 watts	174 m (571 ft)	D	LMS
