= Joyes (department store) =

Former department store in Grays, Essex

- Company type: Private company
- Industry: Retail
- Genre: Department store
- Founded: 1900
- Defunct: 1975
- Fate: Closure
- Headquarters: Grays, Essex
- Key people: Arthur Edgar Joyes

Joyes were a small department store that existed for 75 years in Grays, Essex.

Arthur Edgar Joyes was born in Storrington in 1876 and attended grammar school. After completing his schooling, Arthur learnt the drapery trade as an assistant in a shop in Dorking. He later moved to Essex where he met his wife Mary Ann, who was also working in the drapery trade. In 1900, they married and opened a small drapery store at 4-6 New Road, Grays. They were soon joined by Mary's sister, who was a dressmaker and a female assistant living above the shop.

The store expanded due to its location next to the Market Square and Grays railway station, from a drapery to a small department store extending along New Road to number 20. When Arthur retired the son was handed over to his son Ronald. During the Second World War, a 20 for 1 club was operated, where 20 people would hand in a shilling a week, and once they had saved a pound they were given it back to spend in Joyes. The store used a wire system for payments, which lead to a frosted glass cashiers' room.

However, Grays town centre changed in the 1970s with a modernisation programme and the construction of a new shopping centre, to which the market moved into an undercover section. With the moving of the market the south side of the railway line started to lose custom and in 1975, the 75th anniversary year of the store the business closed.
