= Mark Ryder (musician) =

- Also known as: Mark "Ruff" Ryder; DJ Scoobie; DJ Dubz
- Origin: Romford, London
- Genres: UK garage; house; drum and bass; jungle; breakbeat hardcore
- Occupations: Record producer; DJ
- Years active: 1988–present
- Labels: Strictly Underground; Relentless

Mark Ryder is an English electronic musician, producer and DJ. His best-known release is the UK garage single "Joy" (2001) which reached No. 34 on the UK Singles Chart and number one on the UK Dance Singles Chart.

== Biography ==
In 1988, Ryder founded his label, Strictly Underground Records. He was in the group M-D-Emm, which formed in 1988 and consisted of Ryder, Dave Lee (a.k.a. Joey Negro) and Emmanuel Cheal, releasing house music. Along with his brother Mike James, also a producer, the duo have released records under several aliases. As a solo artist, Ryder has released many records since 1990 under numerous aliases in the breakbeat hardcore, drum and bass, house and UK garage genres. He has also released many mixed compilation albums on his Strictly Underground label. He was a crucial player in the beginnings of early house music, pirate radio and illegal rave parties in the early 1990s culminating in him running some of the biggest legal raves at Wembley under the name Ravalation.
