= Joy (dog) =

Spaniel owned by Alexei, Tsarevich of Russia

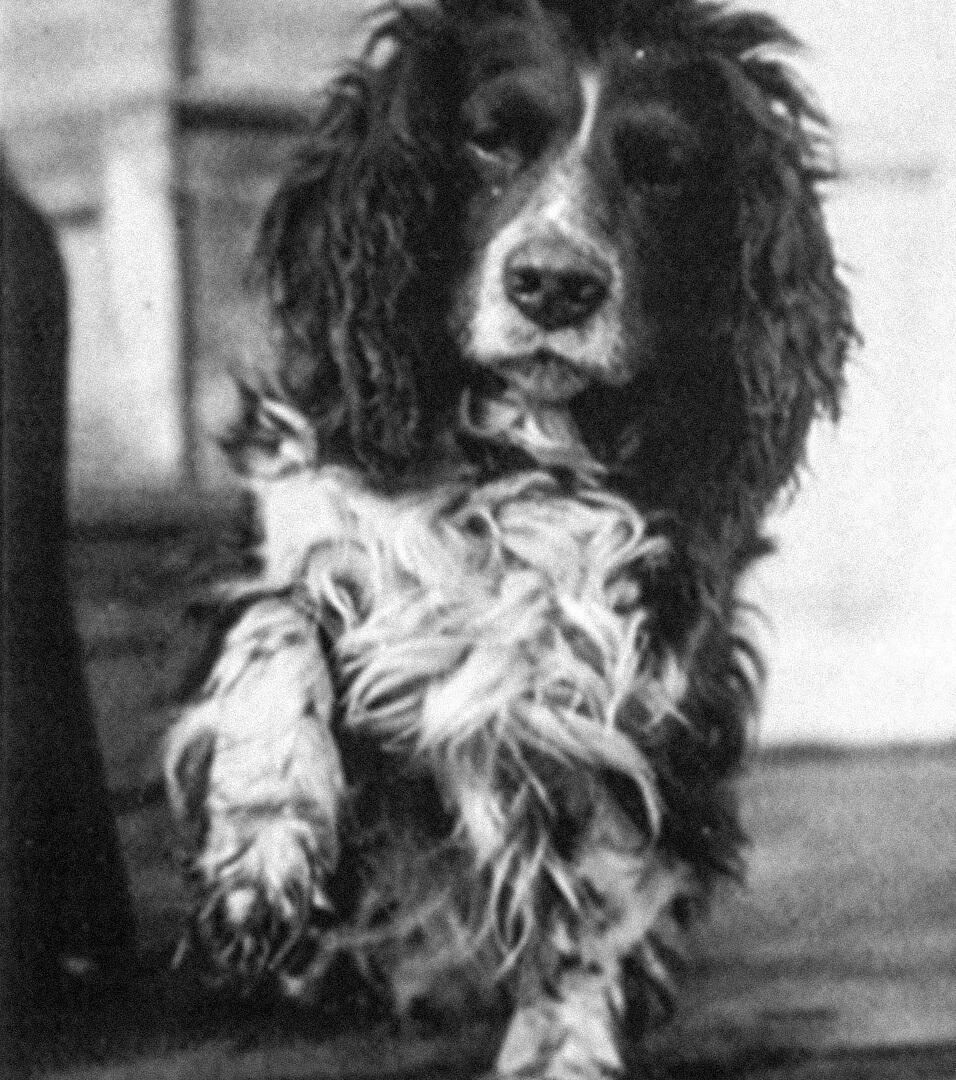
- Joy, the favorite dog of Tsarevich Alexei
- Other name: Russian: Джой
- Species: Canis familiaris
- Breed: English Cocker Spaniel
- Sex: male
- Born: c. 1914; Tsarskoye Selo
- Died: mid-1920s Windsor
- Owner: Alexei Nikolaevich, Tsarevich of Russia
- Appearance: Dark red with white

Joy (Russian: Джой, romanized: Džoj; c. 1914 – mid-1920s) was an English Cocker Spaniel owned by Alexei Nikolaevich, Tsarevich of Russia. Alexei Nikolaevich, born in 1904, was the youngest child and only son of Emperor Nicholas II. Joy, whose origins are unclear, appeared at the palace in 1914 and became closely bonded with Alexei, accompanying him on various trips and providing comfort during his struggles with hemophilia. Joy's quiet nature likely contributed to his survival following the murder of the Romanov family in 1918. After the family's execution, Joy was discovered by the White Army in Yekaterinburg. He was later taken care of by Colonel Pavel Rodzianko, with whom he moved to England after the defeat of the White Army. Joy lived out his final years in Windsor at Rodzianko's estate and died in the mid-1920s.

== Romanov family's dogs ==
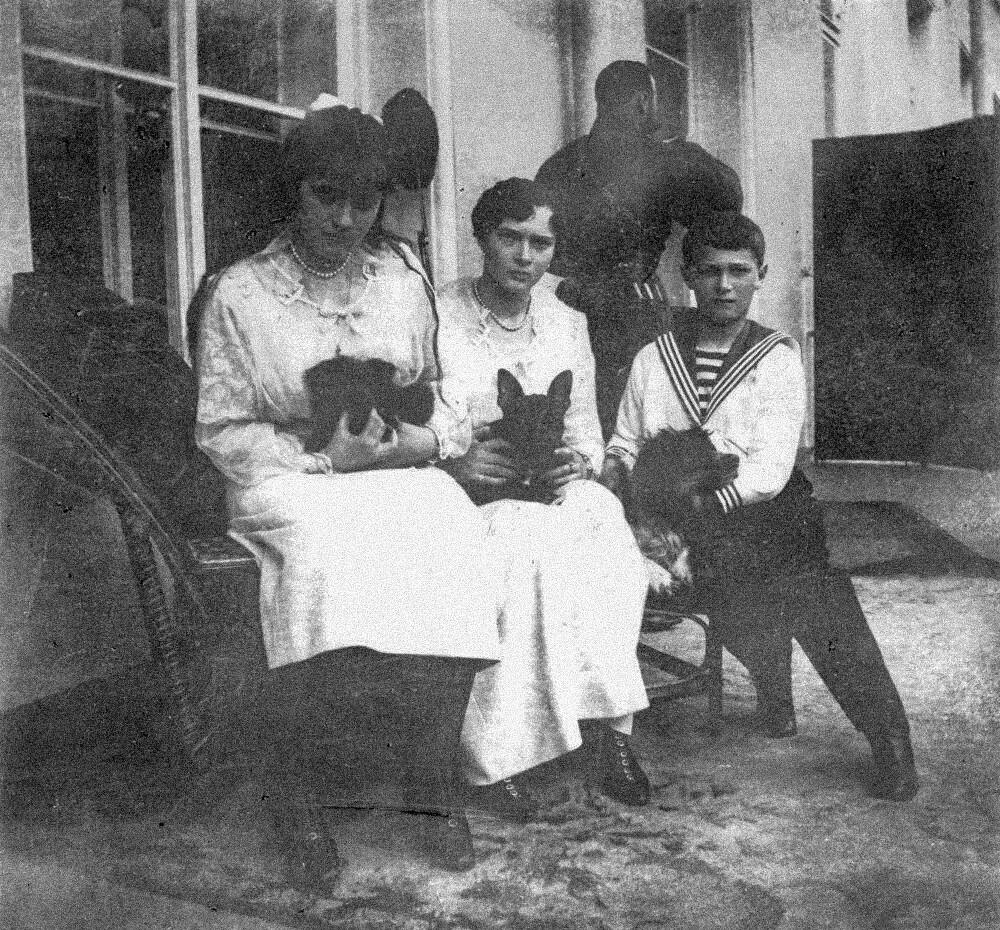
The Tsar's children with their dogs: Anastasia Nikolaevna with Shvybzik, Tatiana Nikolaevna with Ortipo, and Alexei with Joy

The family of the last Russian Emperor, Nicholas II, was fond of pets, having cats, dogs, a donkey, and a goat. The children of Emperor Nicholas II and Empress Alexandra Feodorovna had several dogs during their lifetimes. Among the most well-known dogs owned by the Romanov children were:

Name	Breed	Owner	Origins
Ortipo	French Bulldog	Grand Duchess Tatiana	During World War I, the emperor's daughters worked in a hospital, and this little dog was gifted to Tatiana by the recovering officer Dmitry Yakovlevich Malama, a staff captain of the Russian Imperial Guard of Her Majesty's Regiment.
Jim/Jimmy	King Charles Spaniel (Note: In some sources, Jim is mistakenly referred to as a Bolognese dog.)	Grand Duchess Anastasia	The dog was a gift to Anastasia from Anna Vyrubova, the lady-in-waiting to the Empress.
Joy	English Cocker Spaniel	Tsarevich Alexei	The origins of Joy and how he came into the possession of Tsarevich Alexei remain unclear. Joy appeared at the palace in 1914. His coat was dark red with white. (Note: According to other sources, Joy was either brown-speckled or ginger-speckled.)

== Early life ==
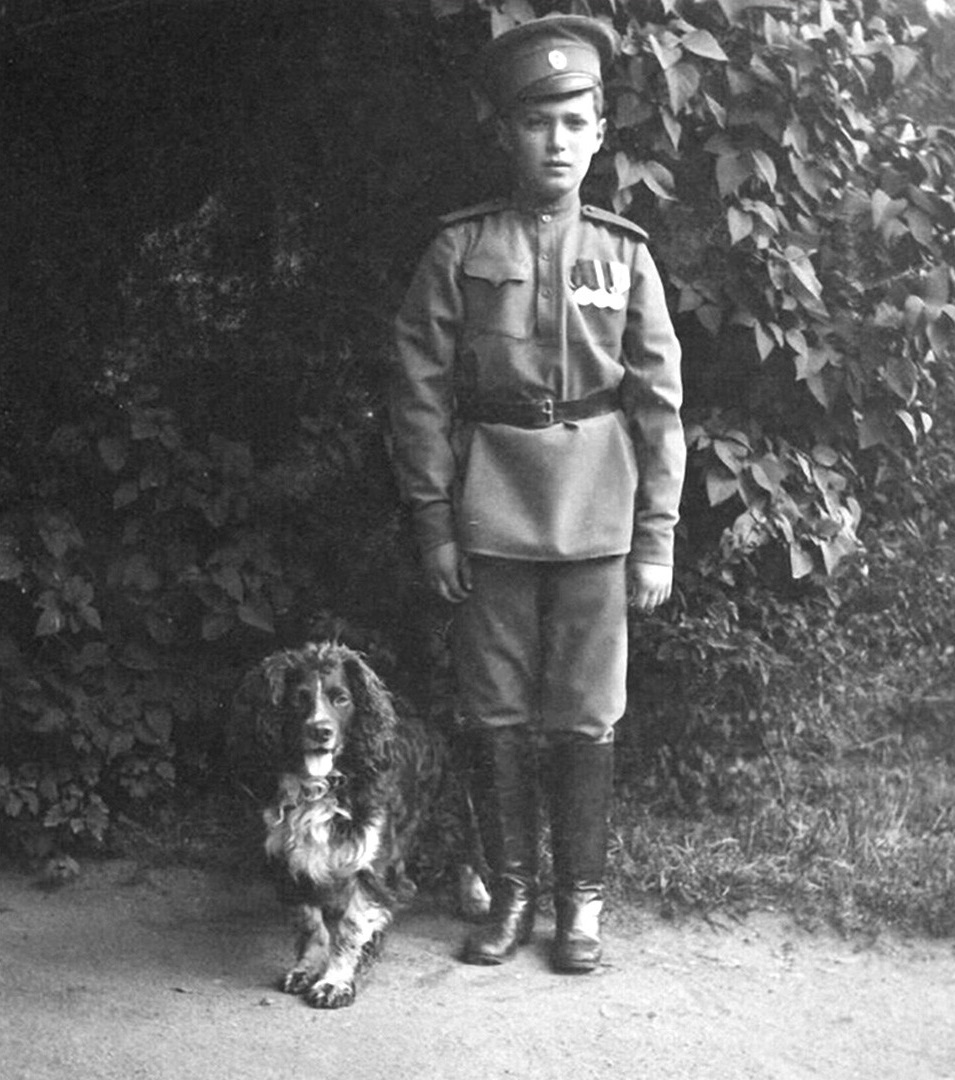
Alexei and Joy

Joy was a descendant of the legendary black cocker spaniel Dash, the first cocker spaniel brought from England for hunting at the request of Grand Duke Nicholas Nikolaevich, the uncle of Nicholas II. Who gave Joy to the Tsarevich and when is unknown. The nickname was given by Empress Alexandra Feodorovna, the granddaughter of Queen Victoria, who also had a great love for dogs. Alexandra wrote in a letter to Alexei on October 31, 1914: "How is your new dog doing? He makes you so happy that you can call him Joy".

Alexei Nikolaevich, born in 1904, was the youngest child and the only son of the Emperor. Joy was the favorite of Tsarevich Alexei and his constant companion. He regularly accompanied his owner on all trips, including sea voyages. In his diary, Alexei recounted:

- August 19, 1916 in Mogilev: "This morning had 2 lessons. Wrote mama before breakfast and had a walk. Was eating breakfast with everyone in the tent. Afternoon was a walk along the Dnepr river. Joy is in hospital. Has worms".
- November 5, 1916: "Since yesterday, there is no pain. Remained still in bed. Before breakfast wrote mama. Spent the day the way I did yesterday: played the sea game and cards, listened to the French and English reading. Joy is constantly with me".
- November 9, 1916: "Finally, I was allowed to leave the bed. Woke up early and drunk coffee at a common table. Wrote a letter to mama. Rode to the station and back, taking Joy with me".

Joy was also taken to the front line at the headquarters in Mogilev during World War I, where the emperor frequently visited with his son to boost the army's morale. When the dog was left at the Alexander Palace at Tsarskoye Selo, the sisters wrote to Alexei: "Joy misses you very much."

Alexei had a deep affection for Joy, a relationship that was well-documented and familiar to the Russian public. Joy was frequently featured in official photographs, commonly seen either being held by Alexei or sitting at his feet, highlighting the close bond between the Tsarevich and his pet despite his health challenges. Among his close friends of the same age, he had only Kolya, the son of Doctor Vladimir Derevenko. Alexei suffered from hemophilia and could not play with other children for fear that a simple bump or scratch could prove fatal, so he spent most of his time with his dog in the garden or on walks. They were rarely apart.

== Exile and survival ==
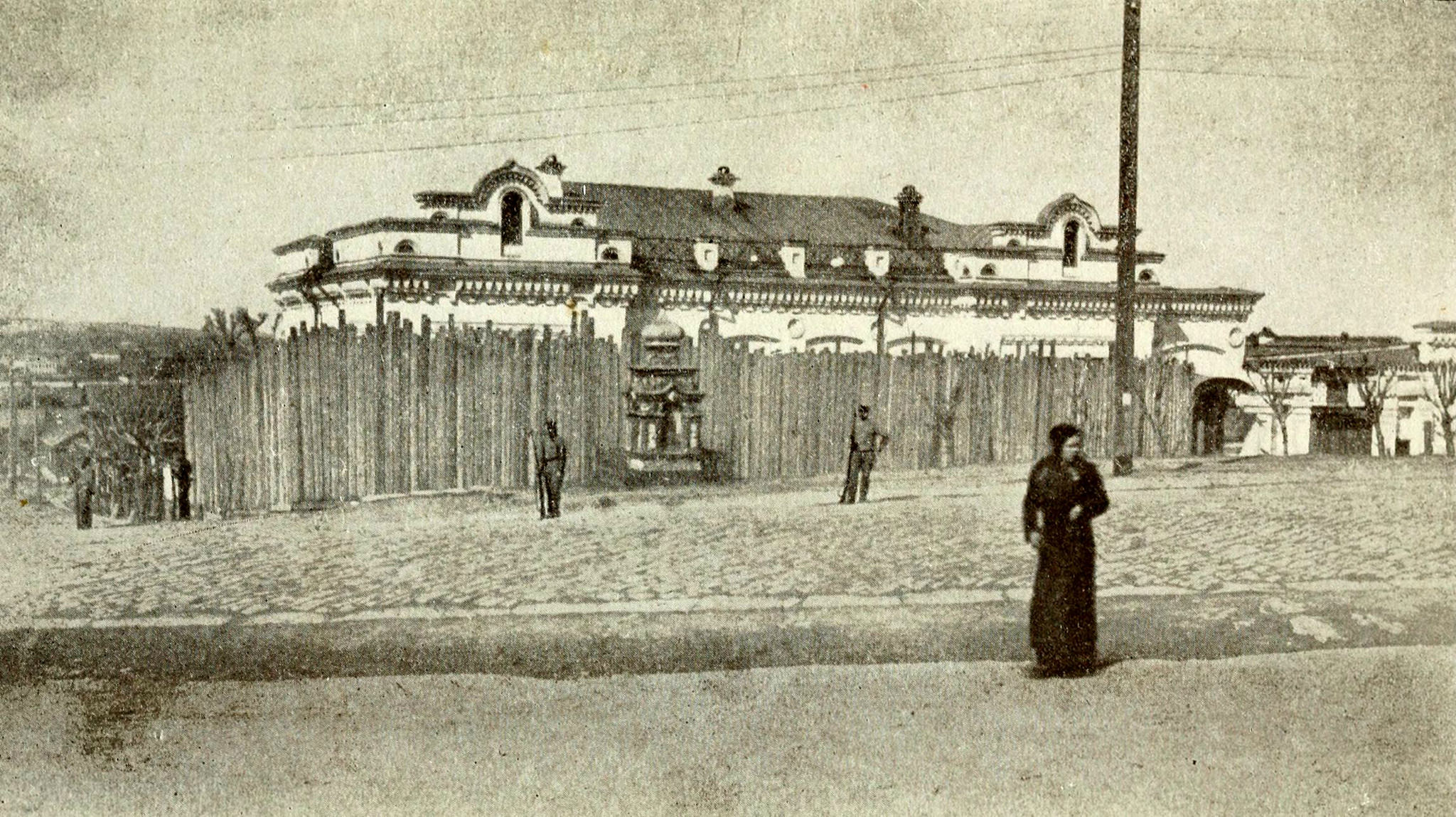
Ipatiev House in Yekaterinburg, where the Romanov family and their dogs were held in captivity

The imperial family was arrested following the February Revolution of 1917, which resulted in the abdication of Nicholas II. On the morning of August 1, 1917, Alexei, along with his parents and sisters, was sent from the Alexander Palace to exile in Tobolsk. They took the dogs with them. Later, along with the royal family, the dogs went from Tobolsk to the Ipatiev House in Yekaterinburg. Joy often spent nights in the courtyard. He was described as a disobedient dog that often ran away, but unlike Ortipo and Jimmy, he was quiet and rarely barked, which presumably saved him during the execution of the royal family. Alexei's sister Olga Nikolaevna wrote in a letter that "Joy, Ortipo, and Jimmy are thriving. The first two have to be kicked out of the yard, where they enjoy themselves in the garbage pit and eat all sorts of rubbish. Joy has many acquaintances in the city, and therefore he always runs away."

On July 17, 1918, the final Imperial family of the Russian Empire — former Tsar Nicholas II, his wife Alexandra, their children Olga, Tatiana, Maria, Anastasia, and Alexei, along with three servants and a doctor — were shot and bayoneted by soldiers of the Red Army in the basement of the Ipatiev House in Yekaterinburg. Alexei, "the boy born to rule all Russia", died aged 13.

Mikhail Kabanov, a member of the Ural Cheka, recounted the execution of the royal family in the Ipatiev House:

Chekist Mikhail Medvedev, with the first shot, fatally shot Nicholas II. At that time, I also discharged my Nagant revolver at the condemned. After that, I had to immediately go to the attic, to the machine gun, to repel any attack by hostile forces on us with my machine gun team. When I ran into the attic, I saw that the light was on in the Mining Institute across the street. The shots could be clearly heard, as well as the loud howling of the Tsar's dogs. I immediately went down to the execution room and said that the shooting in the city could be clearly heard, that the howling of the Tsar's dogs was very loud, and that in the Mining Institute opposite us, all the windows were lit up. I recommended killing the people with cold weapons, as well as killing two of the Tsar's dogs that were howling loudly. The third dog, Joy, was left unharmed because he did not howl. Then, the district doctor examined all the executed and confirmed that they were all dead." Joy was naturally quiet, so he did not irritate the guards.

One of the guards of the Ipatiev House, Anatoly Yakimov, recalled: "The door from the hallway to the rooms where the royal family lived was still closed, but there was no one in the rooms. It was clear: not a sound was heard from there. Before, when the royal family lived there, one could always hear life in their rooms: voices, footsteps. At this time, however, there was no life there. In the hall, near the door to the rooms where the royal family lived, their little dog stood all the time, waiting to be let into the rooms. I remember well, I also thought at the time: you wait in vain."

Alexei was shot twice in the head after the killers noticed that he had survived the first bullet. Anastasia recovered consciousness after the first shot and began to scream; she was stabbed by a bayonet. Jimmy was in Anastasia's arms during the execution and perished alongside her, he was hit on the head. Jimmy's body was discovered the following summer, on June 25, 1919, at the bottom of an open pit during an inspection of the mine by investigator Sokolov. "The right front paw was broken. The skull was penetrated, which, according to the doctor's conclusion, caused his death." Ortipo was left alone in an empty room on the upper floor, and her barking was heard by the guard Kabanov. She was bayoneted by one of the guards for howling loudly to avoid attracting attention to the house. Joy did not bark or howl, and therefore his life was spared.

During the removal of bodies from the basement of the Ipatiev House, Joy ran out onto the street and was taken by one of the house's guards, Mikhail Letemin. When the White Army took Yekaterinburg a week later, one of the officers, who knew the royal family well, recognized Joy on the street. He started asking whose dog it was, and they pointed to Letemin. The guard was arrested, and he gave testimony to the investigation. Joy became the main evidence by which the marauder was discovered by the investigation of the White Army. During the interrogation of Letemin, it was found out that on July 22, 1918, he took 78 items from the Ipatiev House to his home, previously belonging to the Royal Family. He took the dog of the heir Alexei, Joy, "out of pity." (Note: In the inventory list of items found in the apartment of guard Mikhail Letemin in Yekaterinburg on August 6, 1918, there were 78 items numbered from 243 to 320. Entry number 320 read, "The dog of the Heir, Tsarevich Alexei Nikolaevich, a spaniel breed named Joy.")

== After escape ==
On July 25, 1918, eight days after the execution of Nicholas II's family, Yekaterinburg was occupied by units of the White Army under the command of General Mikhail Diterikhs and the Czechoslovak Legion. Admiral Alexander Kolchak immediately ordered an investigation into the death of the Tsar's family. Due to the initial investigators' ineffectiveness, Nikolai Alekseevich Sokolov, an investigator for particularly significant cases at the Omsky District Court, was appointed in February 1919. He meticulously conducted the investigation entrusted to him and collected materials and witness testimonies that could trace the last moments of Nicholas II's family's life.

"The Czechs (Czechoslovak Legion as part of the Russian army), having captured Yekaterinburg, found a poor half-starved animal running around the courtyard of the Ipatiev House. It seemed that the dog was always looking for his owner, and his absence so saddened and depressed him that he barely touched food, even when he was tenderly cared for," wrote Baroness Sophia Karlovna Buxhoeveden (1883–1956), lady-in-waiting to Empress Alexandra Feodorovna. The Baroness was separated from the imperial family in May 1918 in Yekaterinburg.

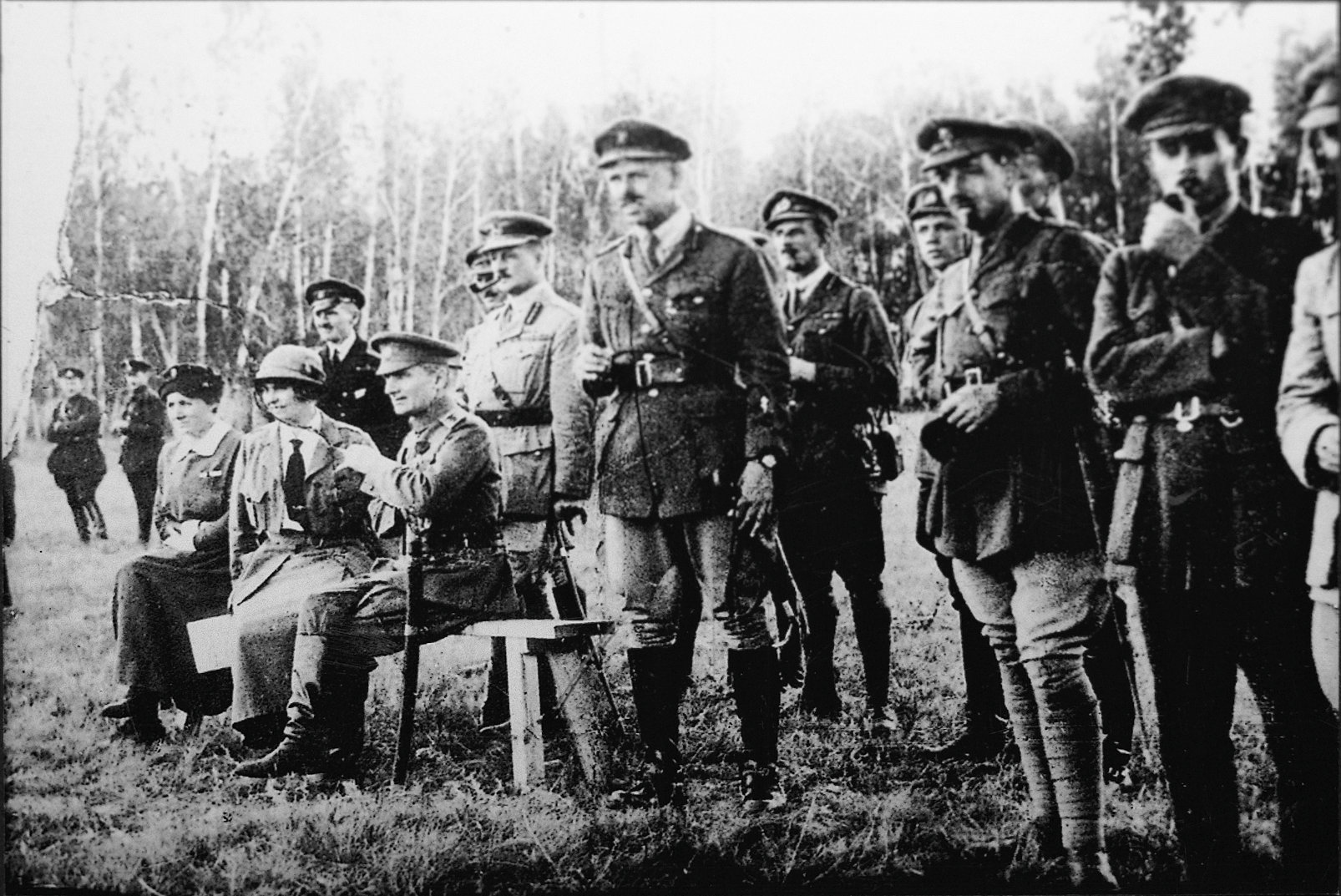
Admiral Kolchak (seated), General Knox (behind Kolchak), and Colonel Rodzianko (to the left of Knox) observing military exercises on the Eastern Front during the Russian Civil War. 1919

She was not allowed into the Ipatiev House, which spared her from execution, and she wrote her memoirs while in exile in London. General Mikhail Diterikhs took Joy with him, and later the spaniel accompanied his new owner to Omsk. In January 1919, Baroness Buxhoeveden, learning that the dog of the murdered Tsarevich Alexei was in Omsk, immediately went to see him. Sensing a familiar person from his past life, the nearly blind dog in despair jumped up and ran towards the Baroness. "I went to see Joy," the Baroness recalled. "And he, apparently in his canine naivety, thinking that his masters were bound to show up with me, became visibly animated. I had never seen a dog so excited. When I called for him, he instantly jumped out of the carriage and rushed across the platform to me, bouncing and making wide circles around me and did not cling to me with his front paws, but paced on his hind legs like a circus dog. General Diterikhs told me that he had never greeted anyone like that before and I attributed it to the fact that my clothes, which were the same ones I had worn in Tobolsk, still had a familiar smell, even though I did not particularly caress him. When I left, Joy lay all day at the door through which I had left. He refused to eat and slipped back into his usual state of despair." Around the same period in Omsk, General Diterikhs handed Joy over to Colonel Pavel Rodzianko, a member of the British military mission of General Sir Alfred Knox in Siberia, who was very fond of animals (before the revolution, he had a pet bear Mishka and his own horse breeding farm). Rodzianko was also known as a sportsman and riding instructor.

After the defeat of the White Army, Pavel Rodzianko emigrated to England with the dog. As the White forces collapsed, and the Reds surged their way across Siberia, the British were ordered home - via the Russian Far East. "With heavy hearts we sailed away from Vladivostok. Joy, the little ill-named spaniel who had seen his master murdered, that fateful night, travelled with me. I have never seen Russia again," wrote Rodzianko in his book Tattered Banners in 1939.

== Later years ==
=== Life in Britain ===
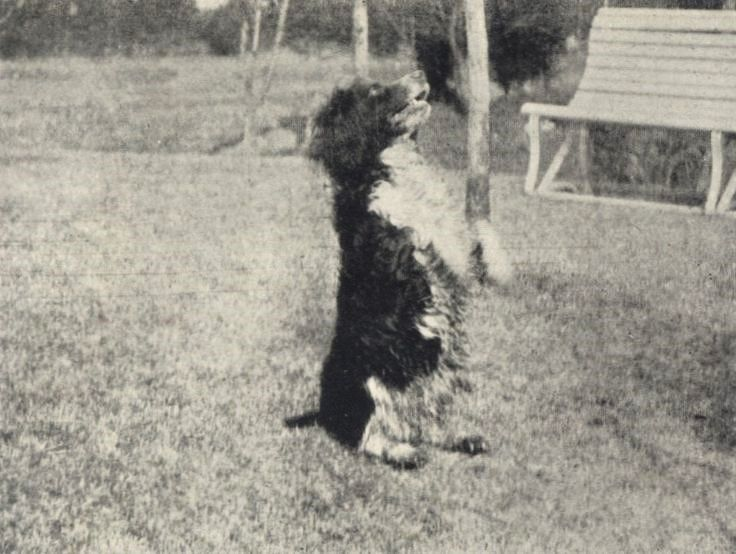
The last photo of Joy, the cocker spaniel, taken in the mid-1920s at Pavel Rodzianko's estate in Windsor.

In Britain, Rodzianko immediately purchased an estate on the border of the famous Windsor Castle and founded a horse riding school there. This school was popular among the aristocracy and attracted many visitors, among whom were Prince Edward of Wales. Pavel Rodzianko also married a young aristocrat, Anita Leslie, who was 34 years his junior. She assisted him in writing his memoirs. Joy lived out his days in a house on Clewer Hill Road in Windsor, in a happy, safe environment. Baroness Sophie Buxhoeveden wrote in her memoirs that "little Joy was well cared for... and he spent his last years in the most comfortable conditions."

Joy died in Windsor, not at the royal court but on the small estate of Colonel Rodzianko, Sefton Lawn, whose park adjoined the royal park. Pavel Rodzianko wrote, "Every time I pass my garden at Windsor, I think of the small dog's tomb in the bushes with the ironical inscription "Here lies Joy". To me, that little stone marks the end of an empire and a way of life." Currently, the site of the grave is occupied by a car park.

=== Controversy ===
Some publications claim that Joy was sheltered by King George V. This version is based on the statements made by Colonel Rodzianko's nephew, Basil Rodzianko (1915–1999), a bishop in the Orthodox Church in America. He claimed that Joy became the property of King George V, the monarch to whom Rodzianko had narrated the demise of his cousin, Nicholas II, and his family. Allegedly, Joy lived with the king and was buried in the Royal Dog Cemetery at Windsor. However, this is merely a myth attempting to trace Joy's life from his early days in the Russian monarchy to his final days in the British monarchy, and it lacks any foundation. Colonel Rodzianko described his visit to Windsor Castle to meet George V for "lunch", where the king questioned the tsarist officer about the details of the death of Nicholas II's family. Among other things, Rodzianko told the king about the Tsarevich's spaniel: "I have described the cold empty rooms and bloody cellar of the Ipatiev House, my fruitless search in the cemetery and the grim journey through the Siberian forest to find a handful of ashes. After lunch His Majesty showed me the pictures, and I told him about Joy, who runs through my garden. Joy seems quite happy, but looking into those light brown eyes, I often wonder what he remembers." King George V did not take the dog for himself and showed no interest in seeing him.

== See also ==
- List of individual dogs

== Bibliography ==
- Sokolov, Nikolay (1924). "Murder of the Royal Family". Ispovednik (in Russian). Russian Orthodox Church.
- Buxhoeveden, Sophie (January 1, 1928). The Life & Tragedy Of Alexandra Feodorovna, Empress Of Russia. A Biography. Longmans, Green and Co. LCCN 29002796.
- Massie, Robert K. (2000). Nicholas and Alexandra: The Classic Account of the Fall of the Romanov Dynasty. Random House Trade Paperbacks. ISBN 9780345438317.
- Welch, Frances (2007). A Romanov Fantasy: Life at the Court of Anna Anderson. W.W. Norton & Company. ISBN 9780393065770.
- Lukyanova, Viktoria (2008). Last angels on the Earth (in Russian). Electronic library RoyalLib.
- Rappaport, Helen (February 3, 2009). The Last Days of the Romanovs: Tragedy at Ekaterinburg. St. Martin's Press. ISBN 9781429991285.
- Manakova, Tatyana (February 25, 2013). "Joy. The history of the royal dog". Journal Foma (in Russian).
- Connaughton, Richard M (2017). Routledge Library Editions: The Russian Civil War. Taylor & Francis. ISBN 9781000415896.
- Rodzianko, Paul (2018). Tattered Banners. An Autobiography. Paul Dry Books. ISBN 9781589881259.
- Rusina, Irina (June 10, 2019). "Colors of Russian Spaniels". Russian Spaniels of St. Petersburg (in Russian).
- Lee, Mackenzi (October 15, 2019). The History of the World in Fifty Dogs. ABRAMS, Incorporated. ISBN 9781683357636.
- Tagansky Row (December 11, 2019). "Tsarevich Alexei's dog, how did he get from Yekaterinburg to the English king after the execution of the royal family?". Tagansky Row (in Russian).
- Gibson, R P (2022). "The Romanov Dog That Survived. The remarkable story of the sole survivor of the Bolshevik death squads". Vocal Media.
- dzen-ru (December 18, 2021). "What happened to Tsarevich Alexei's dog after the execution of the royal family". dzen-ru (in Russian).
- Fokin, Sergey (September 18, 2022). "Joy is the Tsarevich's favorite". Hunting and Fishing XXI Century (in Russian). Agency MK.
- Manaev, Georgii (April 14, 2022). "Joy is the last dog of the Romanovs". Russia Beyound (in Russian).
- Hawkins, George (January 8, 2022). Alexei: Russia's Last Tsesarevich - Letters, diaries and writings. George Hawkins. Independently published. ISBN 9798789126011.
