= The Joy (The Joy album) =

Studio album by The Joy
- Released: 21 June 2024
- Studio: The Church Studios
- Length: 30:24
- Label: Transgressive Records

The Joy chronology
Hammarsdale (2023)	The Joy (2024)

Singles from The Joy
- 1. "You Complete Me" Released: 27 March 2024; 2. "Amaqatha Amancane" Released: 22 April 2024; 3. "Bayang'khethela" Released: 23 May 2024

The Joy is the debut album by South African a cappella group The Joy. It was released on 21 June 2024 on Transgressive Records.

== Background ==
The Joy was formed by five members of a school choir in the township of Hammarsdale. They released an EP called Hammarsdale in August 2023. In Spring 2024 they performed with Doja Cat at Coachella.

The Joy is their debut album, and was recorded live at the Church Studios in London.

== Critical reception ==
Professional ratings
Review scores
Source	Rating
Mojo	4/5 stars
Musikexpress	4/6 stars
Rolling Stone Germany	3.5/5 stars
Songlines	5/5 stars

Mark Sampson of Songlines called The Joy an "exceptional album...the soul of simplicity." In a review for Mojo, David Hutcheon wrote that "Ladysmith Black Mambazo will get a lot of comparative name-checks, but The Joy's sound is their own."

André Boße of Musikexpress described primary lead vocalist Melokuhle Mkhungo's voice as "direct and forceful," and David Hutcheon called it "one of the finds of the year."

== Track listing ==
No.	Title	Length
1.	"Uhlenge"	2:37
2.	"Amaqatha Amancane"	1:37
3.	"Mama ka Nomthandazo"	1:47
4.	"Bayang'khethela"	3:00
5.	"Mama uleli Kanjani"	2:03
6.	"Ngiphuphe Ngilele"	1:53
7.	"Mashaya kancane"	4:02
8.	"uBaba Uthwelekanzima"	2:12
9.	"You Complete Me"	2:26
10.	"Amandla ka Moya"	3:45
11.	"Jesu"	4:56
Total length:		30:24

== Personnel ==
The Joy

- Ntokozo Bright Magcaba ("Pastor")
- Melokuhle Mkhungo ("Duzie")
- Sphelele Hlophe ("Guduza")
- Phelelani Sithole ("Sthombe")
- Sanele Ngcobo ("Marcus")
