= The Joy (band) =

South African a cappella group

- Origin: Hammarsdale, South Africa
- Genres: Isicathamiya
- Labels: Transgressive
- Members: Ntokozo "Pastor" Magcaba; Melokuhle "Duzie" Mkhungo; Sphelele "Guduza" Hlophe; Phelelani "Sthombe" Sithole; Sanele "Marcus" Ngcobo

The Joy are an a cappella group from South Africa. Their debut album The Joy was released on 21 June 2024 on Transgressive Records.

== History ==
The Joy was formed by five members of a school choir in the township of Hammarsdale.

In November 2022 The Joy performed at the Hammersmith Apollo in London as part of Jools Holland's "30th Birthday Bash" special, and in December they sung on The Jennifer Hudson Show.

The Joy released an EP called Hammarsdale in August 2023 on Transgressive Records. Clash described lead single "Mountain" as "a beautiful experience, with its transportive impact sending you half-way across the world to South Africa." In April 2024 they performed with Doja Cat at Coachella, and in May she released three collaborative tracks with them.

On 21 June 2024 The Joy released their eponymous debut album, which was recorded live at the Church Studios in London. David Hutcheon of Mojo wrote that "the harmonies highlight their Zulu upbringing, and of lives spent listening to isicathamiya music," and described primary lead vocalist Melokuhle Mkhungo's voice as "one of the finds of the year."

== Discography ==
Albums

- The Joy (Transgressive, 2024)

Extended Plays

- Hammarsdale (Transgressive, 2023)
