= WODY =

Simulcasting WXRI Winston-Salem
- Fieldale, Virginia; United States
- Broadcast area: Martinsville, Virginia; Henry County, Virginia
- Frequency: 1160 kHz
- Branding: Joy FM

Programming
- Format: Southern Gospel

Ownership
- Owner: Positive Alternative Radio, Inc.

History
- First air date: 1993

Technical information
- Licensing authority: FCC
- Facility ID: 69983
- Class: B
- Power: 5,000 watts daytime 250 watts nighttime
- Transmitter coordinates: 36°42′36.0″N 79°57′58.0″W

Links
- Public license information: Public file; LMS
- Website: Joy FM

WODY (1160 kHz) is a non-commercial radio station licensed to Fieldale, Virginia, serving Martinsville and Henry County, Virginia. WODY is owned and operated by Positive Alternative Radio, Inc. It simulcasts a Southern Gospel radio format from WXRI Winston-Salem, North Carolina, as part of the Joy FM network. It formerly aired programming from ESPN Radio before being bought by Positive Alternative Radio. The network is listener-supported, with the stations holding on-air fundraisers to support the Joy FM ministry.

Former logo as an ESPN Radio station

By day, WODY is powered at 5,000 watts non-directional. But because it broadcasts on the United States clear-channel frequency of 1160 AM, reserved for KSL in Salt Lake City, WODY must reduce power at night to only 250 watts and use a directional antenna to avoid interference. Programming is also heard on FM translator W264CM at 100.7 MHz in Martinsville, Virginia.

== Translator ==
In addition to the main station, WODY is relayed by an FM translator to widen its broadcast area.

Call sign	Frequency	City of license	FID	ERP (W)	HAAT	Class	FCC info
W264CM	100.7 FM	Martinsville, Virginia	93126	180	130.6 m (428 ft)	D	LMS
