= Ever So Lonely =

1981 single by Monsoon

- Artwork for 7-inch single

Single by Monsoon

from the album Third Eye
- B-side: "Sunset over the Ganges"
- Released: 21 August 1981
- Studio: Rockfield
- Genre: World
- Length: 3:58
- Label: The Mobile Suit Corporation
- Songwriter: Steve Coe
- Producers: Hugh Jones; Steve Coe

"Ever So Lonely" is the debut single by British band Monsoon with Sheila Chandra on vocals. The song was written by Steve Coe and was released in August 1981. The single became a No. 12 hit in the United Kingdom following a re-release in March 1982, staying on the UK Singles Chart for nine weeks. It was also a hit in Ireland, the Netherlands and Australia but was never released as a single in the United States. Chandra was aged only 16 and had just left school when her first single was released.

The band were later signed to Phonogram after being discovered by David Claridge and the song was the first release on his new label, The Mobile Suit Corporation. Several different remixes were made including three by Monsoon, two by Ben Chapman, and several by Jakatta.

== Critical reception ==
Reviewing the band, iTunes said:

""The band's pop songs were no different than most, but the addition of Indian instrumentation and Chandra's wonderful voice evoked images of the Orient seldom seen on the British pop charts since George Harrison's excursions with the Beatles."

== Track listings ==
All songs written and composed by Steve Coe except where noted.

7-inch single: CORP 2

Side one
No.	Title	Length
1.	"Ever So Lonely"	3:58

Side two
No.	Title	Length
1.	"Sunset over the Ganges"	3:12

12-inch single: CORP 212

Side one
No.	Title	Length
1.	"Ever So Lonely (Extended Version)"	6:20

Side two
No.	Title	Length
1.	"Sunset over the Ganges"	3:15

== Charts ==
Chart (1982)	Peak position
Australia (Kent Music Report)	40
Ireland (IRMA)	21
Netherlands (Single Top 100)	42
UK Singles (Official Charts)	12

== Jakatta version ==
"So Lonely"

Single by Jakatta

from the album Visions
- Released: 4 February 2002
- Length: 7:44 (original version); 3:41 (radio edit)
- Label: Rulin
- Songwriters: Steve Coe; Dave Lee
- Producer: Dave Lee

Jakatta singles chronology
"American Dream" (2001)	"So Lonely" (2002)	"My Vision" (2002)

"Ever So Lonely" was covered by Jakatta as "So Lonely" using Sheila Chandra's vocals, and it was released from Jakatta's 2002 album, Visions, on 4 February 2002. It surpassed the chart success of the original version, reaching a peak of No. 8 on the UK Singles Chart. It also peaked No. 15 in Spain, No. 31 in Ireland, and No. 51 in Australia.

=== Charts ===
Chart (2002)	Peak position
Australia (ARIA)	51
Australian Club Chart (ARIA)	1
Australian Dance (ARIA)	12
Europe (Eurochart Hot 100)	48
Ireland (IRMA)	31
Scotland Singles (Official Charts)	11
Spain (Promusicae)	15
UK Singles (Official Charts)	8
UK Dance (Official Charts)	1

=== Release history ===
Region	Date	Format(s)	Label(s)	Ref.
United Kingdom	4 February 2002	12-inch vinyl; CD; cassette	Rulin	
Australia	18 March 2002	CD	Ministry of Sound; Rulin; Z	

== See also ==
- List of UK top 10 singles in 2001
