= WRFE =

- Chesterfield, South Carolina; United States
- Frequency: 89.3 MHz
- Branding: Joy FM

Programming
- Format: Southern Gospel
- Affiliations: Salem Radio Network

Ownership
- Owner: Positive Alternative Radio, Inc.

Technical information
- Licensing authority: FCC
- Facility ID: 91536
- Class: C1
- ERP: 50,000 watts (horizontal polarization); 46,000 watts (vertical polarization)
- HAAT: 188.8 meters (619 ft)
- Transmitter coordinates: 34°43′15″N 80°5′18″W

Links
- Public license information: Public file; LMS
- Webcast: Listen live
- Website: joyfm.org

WRFE (89.3 MHz) is a non-commercial, listener-supported FM radio station in Chesterfield, South Carolina. It broadcasts a Southern Gospel radio format, on a network known as "Joy FM." WRFE is owned by Positive Alternative Radio, Inc. and features programming from Salem Radio Network.
