= Monsoon (band) =

British band

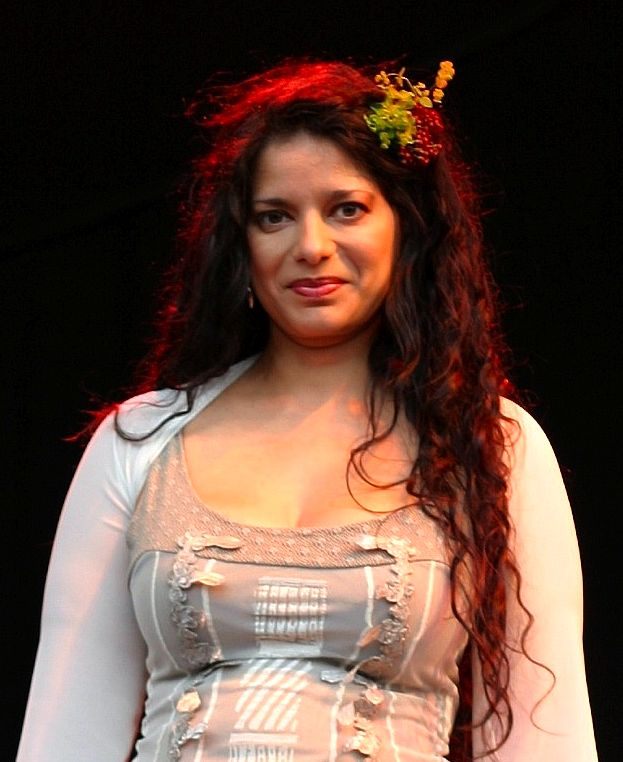
- Sheila Chandra, 2008

Background information
- Origin: England
- Genres: New pop; new wave; Indian pop; raga rock; progressive pop
- Years active: 1981–1983
- Labels: Mobile Suit Corporation (Phonogram Records), Indipop Records, Mercury
- Past members: Sheila Chandra; Steve Coe; Martin Smith

Monsoon was an early 1980s British Indian trio consisting of singer Sheila Chandra, multi-instrumentalist/producer Steve Coe, and bass guitarist Martin Smith. Their song "Ever So Lonely" was a number 12 hit single in the UK Singles Chart in 1982. Midge Ure directed the video for Monsoon's second single, "Shakti (The Meaning of Within)", which just missed out on the top 40 in the UK. Monsoon's third single, "Tomorrow Never Knows" (a cover of the Beatles' 1966 song), featured guest appearances from Bill Nelson, Preston Heyman, Dave Balfe (The Teardrop Explodes) and Merrick (Adam and the Ants).

Due to differences with their label, Phonogram, Monsoon dissolved in 1982. Sheila Chandra started a solo career, Steve Coe continued writing and producing her albums, as well as Martin Smith, but often under the name Ganges Orchestra. Phonogram released Monsoon's only studio album, Third Eye, in 1983, after the act had split up. It has subsequently been re-released multiple times with additional tracks.

== Discography ==
=== Albums ===
- Third Eye (1983), Phonogram
- Monsoon featuring Sheila Chandra (1995, Mercury Records) – re-release of Third Eye includes several previously unreleased tracks

=== Singles ===
Year	Song	UK	AUS
1982	"Ever So Lonely"	12	40
1982	"Shakti (The Meaning of Within)"	41	—
1982	"Tomorrow Never Knows"	—	—
1982	"Wings of the Dawn (Prem Kavita)"	—	—
2001	"So Lonely" (with Jakatta)	8	51

== See also ==
- List of UK top 10 singles in 2001
- Indian pop
