= Joy (Mark Ryder song) =

Single by Mark "Ruff" Ryder
- Released: 19 March 2001
- Recorded: 2000
- Genre: UK garage
- Label: Relentless, Strictly Underground
- Songwriters: Ed Cobb, Mark Ryder
- Producers: Mark Ryder, Mike James

Mark Ryder singles chronology
"It's Not Over" (1998)	"Joy" (2001)	"Booyaka Beats" (2000)

"Joy" is a song by English electronic musician Mark Ryder, released as a single in 2001. It contains samples from Soft Cell's version of "Tainted Love", and features vocals from Special MC and Heidi Rydquist. The song reached the UK Top 40, peaking at No. 34 on the UK Singles Chart and reached No. 1 on the UK Dance Singles Chart in early 2001.

In November 2016, UK duo Gorgon City put "Joy" at #28 on their list of top UK garage songs for Billboard.

== Track listing ==
UK 12"
A1. "Joy" (original version)
A2. "Joy" (rapapella)
B1. "Joy" (Ruff Ryder garage remix)
B2. "Joy" (Waveform breakbeat remix)

== Charts ==
Chart (2001)	Peak position
UK Singles (OCC)	34
UK Dance (OCC)	1
