= American Dream (Jakatta song) =

2001 single by Dave Lee

Single by Jakatta
- Released: 12 February 2001
- Studio: Soundquest (London, England)
- Length: 4:29 (original version); 3:22 (radio edit)
- Label: Rulin
- Songwriters: Thomas Newman; John Dixon Mitchell; Sue Gatlin; Tim Greene
- Producer: Dave Lee

Jakatta singles chronology
"American Dream" (2001)	"So Lonely" (2002)

"American Dream" is a song by English DJ Jakatta, an alias of Dave Lee, who at the time was known as Joey Negro. The track samples two Thomas Newman pieces from the soundtrack for the 1999 film American Beauty: "American Beauty" and "Dead Already". A spoken-word sample from "Two of Hearts" by Stacey Q also appears on the track. The majority of the song is in 6/4 time, which is unusual for dance music, which is typically in 4/4 time.

"American Dream" peaked at No. 3 on the UK Singles Chart and also reached the top 40 in Belgium, Ireland, and Spain. A remix of the song was released in mid-2001 and peaked at No. 63 in the UK. The song was later included on Jakatta's album Visions (2002).

== Track listings ==
UK CD single

1. "American Dream" (radio edit)
2. "American Dream" (Joey Negro club mix)
3. "American Dream" (DifferentGear remix)

UK 12-inch single

A. "American Dream" (Joey Negro club mix)
B. "American Dream" (DifferentGear remix)

UK 12-inch single (remixes)

A. "American Dream" (Lucid remix)
B. "American Dream" (Commie remix)

UK cassette single and European CD single

1. "American Dream" (radio edit) – 3:22
2. "American Dream" (Joey Negro club mix) – 7:08

US 2×12-inch single

A1. "American Dream" (club mix) – 7:09
A2. "American Dream" (radio edit) – 3:23
B1. "American Dream" (DifferentGear remix) – 8:13
B2. "American Dream" (After Life mix) – 4:23
C1. "American Dream" (Ski Oakenfull Dream On mix) – 8:59
D1. "American Dream" (Commie remix) – 9:02
D2. "American Dream" (Lucid remix) – 7:19

Australian CD single

1. "American Dream" (radio edit) – 3:20
2. "American Dream" (Joey Negro club mix) – 7:05
3. "American Dream" (DifferentGear remix) – 8:10
4. "American Dream" (Lucid remix) – 7:17

== Credits and personnel ==
Credits are lifted from the UK CD single liner notes.

Studios

- Recorded at Soundquest (London, England)
- Mastered at Masterpiece (London, England)

Personnel

- Thomas Newman – writing ("Dead Already", "American Beauty")
- John Dixon Mitchell – writing ("Two of Hearts")
- Sue Gatlin – writing ("Two of Hearts")
- Tim Greene – writing ("Two of Hearts")
- Swati Natekar – vocals
- Dave Lee – production, mixing
- K-Boy Brooks – engineering
- Richard Searle – engineering
- Greg Moore – mastering

== Charts ==
=== Weekly charts ===
Original version

Chart (2001)	Peak position
Australia (ARIA)	63
Australian Club Chart (ARIA)	1
Australian Dance (ARIA)	11
Belgium (Ultratop 50 Flanders)	39
Belgium (Ultratop 50 Wallonia)	29
Belgium Dance (Ultratop Flanders)	17
Europe (Eurochart Hot 100)	15
France (SNEP)	62
Ireland (IRMA)	16
Ireland Dance (IRMA)	1
Netherlands (Single Top 100)	90
Scottish Singles Sales (Official Charts)	3
Spain (Promusicae)	15
UK Singles (Official Charts)	3
UK Dance (Official Charts)	1

Remix

Chart (2001)	Peak position
Scottish Singles Sales (Official Charts)	77
UK Singles (Official Charts)	63
UK Dance (Official Charts)	21

=== Year-end charts ===
Chart (2001)	Position
Australian Club Chart (ARIA)	10
UK Singles (OCC)	51

== Certifications ==
Region	Certification	Certified units/sales
United Kingdom (BPI)	Silver	200,000^{^}
^{^} Shipments figures based on certification alone.

== Release history ==
Region	Date	Format(s)	Label(s)	Ref.
United Kingdom	12 February 2001	12-inch vinyl; CD; cassette	Rulin	
Spain	April 2001	12-inch vinyl; CD	Vendetta	
Spain	May 2001	12-inch remix vinyl	Vendetta	
Australia	19 March 2001	CD	Ministry of Sound; Rulin	
