= My Vision (song) =

2002 single by Jakatta

- UK CD cover artwork

Single by Jakatta featuring Seal

from the album Visions
- Released: 30 September 2002
- Studio: Beverly Hills, California (vocals)
- Length: 3:45 (radio edit)
- Label: Rulin
- Songwriters: Seal; Dave Lee; Rick Salmon; Thomas Newman
- Producer: Dave Lee

Dave Lee singles chronology
"So Lonely" (2002)	"My Vision" (2002)	"One Fine Day" (2002)

Seal singles chronology
"Les Mots" (2001)	"My Vision" (2002)	"Get It Together" (2002)

Audio
- "My Vision" (radio edit on YouTube

"My Vision" is a song by English DJ and producer Dave Lee, released on 30 September 2002 under one of his stage names, Jakatta. The track features British musician Seal on vocals. Lee wrote the song along with Seal and Rick Salmon, and it was produced by Lee. It is also based on the composition "Brooks Was Here" from the 1994 prison drama film The Shawshank Redemption, which was scored by Thomas Newman. "My Vision" experienced commercial success, peaking at number six on the UK Singles Chart and entering the top 50 on the music charts of five other countries. A music video made for the song features Seal singing in a desert.

== Critical reception ==
Mario Mosic of Croatian radio station Radio Dalmacija said of "My Vision", "It's a cool track ... Whenever Seal is sings [sic], his voice lends something special to the track, no matter what the background music is".

== Chart performance ==
On 6 October 2002, "My Vision" debuted and peaked at number six on the UK Singles Chart, remaining in the top 100 for 11 nonconsecutive weeks. Elsewhere in Europe, the single reached number 16 in Spain, number 24 in Italy, number 34 in Ireland, and number 36 in the Flanders region of Belgium. On the Eurochart Hot 100, it debuted at number 26, its peak. In Australia, it spent one week in the top 50 at number 43, and it also reached number 10 on the ARIA Dance Chart.

== Track listings ==
UK CD single

1. "My Vision" (radio edit) – 3:43
2. "My Vision" (Summer in White edit) – 3:52
3. "My Vision" (Joey Negro club mix) – 7:47

UK 12-inch single

A. "My Vision" (Joey Negro club edit) – 7:47
B. "My Vision" (Layo and Bushwacka! remix) – 8:01

Australian CD single

1. "My Vision" (radio edit) – 3:45
2. "My Vision" (Joey Negro club edit) – 7:47
3. "My Vision" (Layo and Bushwacka! remix) – 8:01

== Credits and personnel ==
Credits are taken from the UK CD single liner notes.

Recording location

- Vocals recorded in Beverly Hills, California, US

Personnel

- Dave Lee (Jakatta) – writing, production, mixing
- Seal – writing, vocals
- Rick Salmon – writing
- Thomas Newman – writing ("Brooks Was Here")
- Michele Chiavarini – keys
- Richard Chycki – recording
- John O'Donnell – engineering
- Form – design
- Stylorouge – logo

== Charts ==
=== Weekly charts ===
Chart (2002–2003)	Peak position
Australia (ARIA)	43
Australian Dance (ARIA)	10
Belgium (Ultratop 50 Flanders)	36
Belgium (Ultratip Bubbling Under Wallonia)	15
Belgium Dance (Ultratop Flanders)	25
Europe (Eurochart Hot 100)	26
Hungary (Editors' Choice Top 40)	39
Ireland (IRMA)	34
Italy (FIMI)	24
Scotland Singles (OCC)	8
Spain (PROMUSICAE)	16
UK Singles (OCC)	6
UK Dance (OCC)	4

=== Year-end charts ===
Chart (2002)	Position
UK Singles (OCC)	138
UK Airplay (Music Week)	49

== Release history ==
Region	Date	Format(s)	Label(s)	Ref(s).
United Kingdom	30 September 2002	12-inch vinyl; CD; cassette	Rulin	
Australia	7 October 2002	CD	Rulin; Ministry of Sound; Z	
