= Bamboo (production act) =

Bamboo was a short-lived British house production act formed by producer Andrew Livingstone, formerly of Hed Boys (with Dave Lee/Joey Negro). It had a #2 hit in the UK singles chart with "Bamboogie" in 1998, which was based on a sample from the KC and the Sunshine Band's 1975 US #1 single "Get Down Tonight". The act's other hit single, also in 1998, was "The Strutt", which peaked at #36 and featured Erin Lordan on vocals. Both singles were released on the VC Recordings label, a subsidiary label of Virgin Records. Livingstone also co-produced Take That's cover version of "Relight My Fire" in 1993 along with Dave Lee.
