= WTJY =

- Asheboro, North Carolina; United States
- Frequency: 89.5 MHz
- Branding: "Joy FM"

Programming
- Format: Southern Gospel
- Affiliations: Salem Communications

Ownership
- Owner: Positive Alternative Radio, Inc.

History
- First air date: June 30, 1999; 26 years ago
- Call sign meaning: WT JoY

Technical information
- Licensing authority: FCC
- Facility ID: 53092
- Class: C2
- ERP: 310 watts
- HAAT: 163 meters (535 ft)
- Transmitter coordinates: 35°36′55″N 79°53′26″W

Links
- Public license information: Public file; LMS
- Website: joyfm.org

WTJY (89.5 FM) is a radio station broadcasting a Southern Gospel format. Licensed to Asheboro, North Carolina, United States. The station is owned by Positive Alternative Radio, Inc. and features programming from Salem Communications.
