= Turbo (soundtrack) =

2013 soundtrack album

Turbo (Music from the Motion Picture)

Soundtrack album by Henry Jackman and various artists
- Released: July 15, 2013
- Recorded: 2013
- Genres: Film score; pop; rock; electronic dance music; orchestral
- Length: 59:38 (standard); 87:26 (deluxe)
- Label: Relativity Music Group
- Producer: Henry Jackman

Henry Jackman chronology
This Is the End (2013)	Turbo (2013)	Kick-Ass 2 (2013)

Singles from Turbo (Music from the Motion Picture)
- 1. "Let the Bass Go" Released: June 13, 2013

Turbo (Original Motion Picture Score)

Film score by Henry Jackman
- Released: July 29, 2013
- Recorded: 2013
- Genre: Film score
- Length: 55:36
- Label: Relativity Music Group
- Producer: Henry Jackman

Turbo (Music from the Motion Picture) is the soundtrack to the 2013 DreamWorks Animation film of the same name. Released by Relativity Music Group on July 15, 2013, it featured several pop, rock and EDM tracks, from artists such as Run-DMC, Tom Jones, The Jackson 5, Pitbull and Lil Jon among several others. Snoop Dogg who voiced Smoove Move in the film, also performed the song "Let the Bass Go". He debuted the song at the E3 convention center as a single on June 13, 2013, and furthermore performed live at the event.

The musical score is composed by Henry Jackman, collaborating with DreamWorks for the third time after scoring Monsters vs. Aliens (2009) and Puss in Boots (2011). Six cues from Jackman's score also featured in the soundtrack. Additional ten cues from the album was featured in the deluxe edition, released along with the soundtrack and also included a song. However, an original score album consisting Jackman's score previously included in the soundtrack, with four newer tracks had been released on July 29.

== Track listing ==
All tracks are written by Henry Jackman, except where noted.

Turbo (Music from the Motion Picture)
No.	Title	Artist(s)	Length
1.	"Let the Bass Go"	Snoop Dogg	3:55
2.	"Another Day at the Plant"		2:52
3.	"It's Tricky"	Run–D.M.C.	3:04
4.	"What's New Pussycat?"	Tom Jones	2:19
5.	"Drop It Like It's Hot"	Snoop Dogg featuring Pharrell Williams	4:28
6.	"Supersnail"		1:47
7.	"Meet the Competition"		2:35
8.	"Krazy"	Pitbull featuring Lil Jon	3:44
9.	"Jump Around"	House of Pain	3:39
10.	"Goin' Back to Indiana"	Jackson 5	3:32
11.	"The Snail is Fast"	V12 and Nomadik	3:18
12.	"Indianapolis"		2:30
13.	"Tuck & Roll"		4:21
14.	"Speedin'"	Classic	2:21
15.	"Here We Come"	V12 and Classic	2:31
16.	"Eye of the Tiger" (Sher Gunn Remix)	Survivor	5:52
17.	"Saturday Night"	Ozomatli	4:01
18.	"Turbo"		2:49
Total length:			59:38

Turbo (Music from the Motion Picture) – deluxe edition
No.	Title	Artist(s)	Length
19.	"The Snail Is Fast" (The Cataracs Remix)	Nomadik and V12	2:44
20.	"Snail vs. Mower"		3:40
21.	"Alarming Changes"		1:03
22.	"Crow Attack!"		1:41
23.	"Starlight Plaza"		1:29
24.	"Two Dreamers"		1:54
25.	"Let Him Race"		2:43
26.	"Guy Gagné"		3:46
27.	"Racing Day"		0:43
28.	"The Race Is On"		4:39
29.	"You're Amazing"		3:26
Total length:			87:26

Turbo (Original Motion Picture Score)
No.	Title	Length
1.	"Indy 500†"	1:38
2.	"Another Day At The Plant†"	2:52
3.	"Snail vs. Mower†"	3:38
4.	"Despondent†"	2:04
5.	"Supersnail"	1:46
6.	"Alarming Changes"	1:00
7.	"Shell Crusher"	2:40
8.	"Crow Attack!"	1:34
9.	"Meet The Competition"	2:39
10.	"Taco Dreamer"	1:15
11.	"Those Guys Are Awesome"	1:19
12.	"Daydreaming"	3:18
13.	"Ride Of A Lifetime"	1:22
14.	"Arrival At Indianapolis"	3:36
15.	"You Got A Plan?"	1:00
16.	"Guy Gagné"	3:44
17.	"To The Starting Line"	3:08
18.	"Snail Up"	1:52
19.	"The Race Is On"	4:36
20.	"Tuck & Roll"	4:20
21.	"And It Looks Like The Winner Is?"	2:15
22.	"Mollusk Upgrade"	1:12
23.	"Turbo"	2:48
Total length:		55:36

† newer themes, not included in the soundtrack.

== Reception ==
James Christopher Monger of AllMusic called the soundtrack as "fun and familiar". Calling it as "effortlessly charming", critic based at Movie Music Mania felt that the score rarely "meanders into a generic, comedic tone", but called it "enjoyable from start to finish". The review further hailed it as "one of the best animated film scores of the year". Joel Covey of Socal Thrills reviewed "The highlight remains Henry Jackman's arrangements that surprisingly sound quite different from song to song and yet still retains the identity of the film. This is a great pick-up for some strong composed instrumental segments. The other songs may be considered just something extra that came with the score."

Todd McCarthy of The Hollywood Reporter called that Jackman's score "is nothing if not propulsive". Brent Simon of Screen International reviewed "composer Henry Jackman's score doesn't quite match the lively, creative heights he touched with his work on Wreck-It Ralph, it does hit all the proper keys of aural stimulation, especially in the movie's energetic race sequences". Daniel Schweiger of Assignment X reviewed "Combining rocking action with Spaghetti western stylings and pokily suspenseful percussion, Jackman finally arrives at the Indy 500 with a fanfare that Superman himself would admire, then unleashes blazingly exciting music that flies by every rocking symphonic curve on the track. However, he doesn't forget to play the heroic determination that propels the music." Nick Allen of Den of Geek commented the Pixar sensibilities of the film, commenting Jackman's music sounded like "it was swiped from Michael Giacchino's trash bin when he was writing the music to Up".

== Chart performance ==
Chart (2013)	Peak position
US Top Soundtracks (Billboard)	25

== Accolades ==
Award	Category	Winner/Nominee	Result
Annie Award	Music in an Animated Feature Production	Henry Jackman	Nominated

== Personnel ==
Credits adapted from CD liner notes.

- Additional music – Halli Cauthery, Paul Mounsey
- Assistant engineer – Alex Williams, Antonio Bruno, Vivian Aguiar-Buff
- Technical engineer – Victor Olegovich Chaga
- Recording – Nick Wollage
- Additional recording – Greg Collins
- Digital recordist – Chris Barrett
- Mixing – Chris Fogel
- Mixing assistance – John Witt Chapman
- Mastering – Stephen Marsh
- Score editor – Daniel Pinder
- Assistant score editor – Christopher Kaller
- Music supervisor – Charlene Ann Huang
- Music preparation – Booker White
- Music consultant – George Drakoulias
- Music librarian – Jill Streater
- Score co-ordinator – Frank J. Garcia
- Executive producer – Bob Bowen, Jason Markey, Ryan Kavanaugh
- Technician – Steven Kofsky

Choir

- Choir – Metro Voices
- Choirmaster – Jenny O'Grady
- Conductor – Gavin Greenaway

Orchestra

- Conductor – Gavin Greenaway
- Orchestra contractor – Isobel Griffiths
- Assistant orchestra contractor – Lucy Whalley
- Orchestra leader – Everton Nelson
- Supervising orchestration – Stephen Coleman
- Additional orchestration – Andrew Kinney, John Ashton Thomas
- Stage assistant – John Prestage
- Stage management – Alison Burton, Czarina Russell, Tina Morris

Management

- Music business and legal affairs – Kevin Breen
- Music co-ordinator (Relativity Music Group) – Ian Broucek
- Music clearances (Relativity Music Group) – Julie Butchko, Christine Bergren
- Executive in charge of music (DreamWorks Animation) – Sunny Park
- Executive in charge of soundtracks (Relativity Music Group) – Jason Markey
- Packaging design – Jordan Butcher
