= Wreck-It Ralph (franchise) =

Disney media franchise

- Created by: Rich Moore; Phil Johnston; Jim Reardon
- Developed by: Phil Johnston Jennifer Lee
- Original work: Wreck-It Ralph (2012)
- Owner: The Walt Disney Company
- Years: 2012–present

Print publications
- Book: Tie-in novels
- Comics: Disney Comic Zone comics

Films and television
- Films: Wreck-It Ralph (2012); Ralph Breaks the Internet (2018)

Games
- Video games: Wreck-It Ralph (2012); Sonic & All-Stars Racing Transformed (2012)^{*}; Disney Infnity (2013)^{*}; Disney Magical World 2 (2015)^{*}; Disney Magic Kingdoms (2016)^{*}; Wreck-It Ralph: Ralph Breaks VR (2018); Kingdom Hearts III (2019)^{*}; Kingdom Hearts χ (2019)^{*}; Disney Speedstorm (2023)^{*}; Disney Dreamlight Valley (2023)^{*}

Audio
- Soundtracks: Wreck-It Ralph (Original Motion Picture Soundtrack) (2012); Ralph Breaks the Internet (Original Motion Picture Soundtrack) (2018)
- Original music: "When Can I See You Again?"; "Sugar Rush"; "Zero"; "In This Place"
- ^{*} Work where this franchise's characters or settings appeared as part of a crossover, or has characters based on those from this franchise.

Wreck-It Ralph is a Disney media franchise primarily consisting of an animated comedy film series produced by Walt Disney Animation Studios and released by Walt Disney Pictures. The series tells the story of the eponymous arcade game villain named Wreck-It Ralph, who rebels against his "bad guy" role and dreams of becoming a hero. The series has grossed $1 billion worldwide.

The series is notable for featuring cameos of characters from licensed properties including video games and various Disney franchises.

== Films ==
=== Wreck-It Ralph (2012) ===
Ralph, desiring to be the hero, sneaks into Hero's Duty to steal the hero medal there, but inadvertently fires himself off in an escape ship when attacked by a Cy-Bug, one of the game's enemies, through the power strip, and into Sugar Rush, where he meets Vanellope for the first time. Vanellope is a glitch within the game who wants to become a playable character, and Ralph helps her along, forming a bond between them. Felix and Calhoun team up to find Ralph before Fix-It Felix, Jr. is to be unplugged, and before the Cy-Bug can reproduce in Sugar Rush and destroy the game. Ralph discovers that the population of Sugar Rush has been suppressed by King Candy, who is really Turbo; not only had he managed to escape into Sugar Rush, but also rewrote part of Vanellope's code, displacing her as the game's main character. Ralph, Vanellope, Felix, and Calhoun work together and defeat Turbo and the Cy-Bugs, saving both Sugar Rush and the arcade and later sparing Fix-It Felix, Jr. from being unplugged. Ralph is finally recognized as a hero, and happily returns to his duties in his game, while Vanellope enjoys her new popularity among the arcade players.

=== Ralph Breaks the Internet (2018) ===
After Turbo was defeated in the first film, Sugar Rush's racing wheel is damaged, and due to the company that produced Sugar Rush going defunct years earlier, Mr. Litwak plans to take the game away for spare parts. Ralph and Vanellope learn of a replacement wheel from eBay, and use a new Internet router in the arcade to travel to the Internet to get it, while the recently married Felix and Calhoun stay to make sure the Sugar Rush characters have a temporary home. Ralph and Vanellope successfully win the auction but do not have the funds to get it, and look for job opportunities. When Ralph finds a way to earn all the funds by becoming a viral video star with the help of Yesss, he discovers that Vanellope may want to stay in the gritty racing game Slaughter Race and not return to the arcade thanks to Shank, a character from that game. This prompts Ralph to use a dark web virus to shut down the game and save Vanellope, only for the virus to turn on Ralph's own insecure feelings and start propagating through the Internet and destroying it. Ralph, Vanellope, and their newfound allies are able to stop the virus in time thanks to the power of Ralph and Vanellope's rekindled friendship. The two say their goodbyes and Ralph returns to the arcade just as Sugar Rush is plugged back in. The two keep in contact, however.

=== Future ===
==== Third film (TBA) ====
John C. Reilly says that he has an idea if a third film was to be made, he would consider seeing Ralph and Vanellope "beaming themselves right out into space."

==== Untitled spin-off film ====
Directors Rich Moore and Phil Johnston said that a Ralph Breaks the Internet spin-off film focusing on the Disney Princesses could be made depending on the audience's response and "if there's a good story to be told".

== Video games ==
=== Wreck-It Ralph (2012, Nintendo) ===
In 2012, a video game of the same name was released alongside the first film for the DS, Wii, and 3DS. Most of the principal cast from the film reprised their roles with the exception of John C. Reilly as Wreck-it-Ralph who was replaced by Brian T. Delaney.

Taking place after the events of the film, the game follows Ralph and Felix as they traverse through Fix-It Felix Jr., Hero's Duty, and Sugar Rush in an attempt to stop a new army of Cy-Bugs that hatched during one of Vanellope's races.

=== Wreck-It Ralph (2012, Mobile) ===
The mobile version of the same name, is centered around playable versions of the games featured in the film such as Fix it Felix Jr, Hero's Duty, Sugar Rush, and Turbo Time. The game's main hub is Game Central station where the player is guided by the Surge Protector. The game was removed from all storefronts on April 12, 2014.

=== Wreck-It Ralph: Ralph Breaks VR (2018) ===
A VR video game experience called Wreck-It Ralph: Ralph Breaks VR opened at The Void locations in 2018, along with the second film.

=== Other titles ===
==== Disney Universe ====
The travellers can acquire a costume based on Wreck-It Ralph.

==== Sonic & All-Stars Racing Transformed ====
Wreck-It Ralph appears as a playable character in the 2012 video game Sonic & All-Stars Racing Transformed.

==== Disney Infinity series ====
Wreck-It Ralph and Vanellope feature in the 2013 toys-to-life video game Disney Infinity. The characters are playable via toys available in both single packs and a "Toy Box" pack that adds locations and elements from the original film to the game's "Toy Box" mode. The toys are also compatible with the game's sequels, 2014's Disney Infinity 2.0 and 2015's Disney Infinity 3.0.

==== Disney Magic Kingdoms ====
Content of Wreck-It Ralph was included in the world builder video game Disney Magic Kingdoms, in a limited time Event focused on Ralph Breaks the Internet, with Ralph, Vanellope, Felix, Caulhoun, Yesss, Shank and Spamley as playable characters, along with some attractions based on locations of the film. KnowsMore also appears a non-player character within The Internet attraction. Gord was also included as a playable character in a later update of the game. The game also includes costumes for the Disney Princesses based on their comfy clothes from Ralph Breaks the Internet. In the game the characters are involved in new storylines that serve as a continuation of the events of Ralph Breaks the Internet.

==== Kingdom Hearts series ====
Wreck-It Ralph appears in the 2019 video game Kingdom Hearts III as a Link. When summoned, he will place explosive blocks and destroy them, causing damage to nearby enemies. A world based on Wreck-It Ralph was added to the 2017 mobile game Kingdom Hearts Union χ as part of an update in April 2019. The world adapts the events of the original film.

==== Disney Dreamlight Valley ====
Ralph and Vanellope appear as one of the villagers at the titular valley of Disney Dreamlight Valley. The game also features clothes for the player and decorations based on Wreck-It Ralph.

== Theme parks and attractions ==
=== Sugar Rush: Sweet Rescue ===
On April 26, 2024, it was announced that Buzz Lightyear Astro Blasters will be permanently closed on October 31, 2024, to make way for an all-new unnamed Wreck-It Ralph attraction based on Sugar Rush, which will be originally set to open in 2026 in Tomorrowland at Tokyo Disneyland. However, on January 29, 2026, it was announced that the opening date of the attraction had been delayed to April 15, 2027 at Tokyo Disneyland. This attraction will take place after the events of Ralph Breaks the Internet, reuniting Ralph and Vanellope with each other. On August 12, 2026, it was announced that the name of the attraction is Sugar Rush: Sweet Rescue and more new details will be revealed at Tokyo Disneyland, and the surrounding area will be called Tomorrowland Plaza.

== Cast ==
List indicators

This section includes characters who will appear or have appeared in in the franchise.

- An empty grey cell indicates the character was not in the film, or that the character's official presence has not yet been confirmed.
- ^{A} indicates an appearance through archival footage or audio.
- ^{U} indicates an uncredited appearance.

Characters	Films		Video games		
Characters	Wreck-It Ralph	Ralph Breaks the Internet	Wreck-It Ralph	Wreck-It Ralph (IOS)	Ralph Breaks VR
Principal characters
Wreck-It Ralph	John C. Reilly	John C. Reilly	Brian T. Delaney	John C. Reilly^{A}	John C. Reilly
Vanellope Von Schweetz	Sarah Silverman	Sarah Silverman	Sarah Silverman	Sarah Silverman^{A}	Sarah Silverman
Fix-It Felix Jr.	Jack McBrayer	Jack McBrayer	Jack McBrayer	Jack McBrayer^{A}	
Sgt. Tamora Jean Calhoun	Jane Lynch	Jane Lynch	Jane Lynch	Jane Lynch^{A}	
Turbo / King Candy	Alan Tudyk		Silent cameo	Silent role	
Shank		Gal Gadot			Photograph
Yesss		Taraji P. Henson			
Supporting characters
Surge Protector	Phil Johnston	Phil Johnston	Phil Johnston	Phil Johnston	
Mr. Stan Litwak	Ed O'Neill	Ed O'Neill			
Sour Bill	Rich Moore	Rich Moore			
Taffyta Muttonfudge	Mindy Kaling	Melissa Villaseñor	Silent cameo		Photograph
Mayor Gene	Raymond S. Persi	Raymond S. Persi	Silent cameo	Silent cameo	
Duncan	Horatio Sanz	Horatio Sanz			
Candlehead	Katie Lowes	Katie Lowes	Silent role		
Moppet Girl	Stefanie Scott		Silent role		
Mary	Edie McClurg	Silent role	Silent role		
Winchell	Adam Carolla	Uncredited actor			
Markowski	Joe Lo Truglio				
Deanna	Rachael Harris	Silent role	Silent role		
J.P. Spamley		Bill Hader^{U}			
KnowsMore		Alan Tudyk			
Arthur		John DiMaggio John C. Reilly (Note: Reilly provided the voice of "Ralphzilla", a monstrous version of Arthur that possesses Ralph's insecurities.)			
Double Dan		Alfred Molina			
B.E.V.					Pamela Ribon
Litwack's Arcade
Sonic the Hedgehog	Roger Craig Smith	Roger Craig Smith			
Zangief	Rich Moore	Rich Moore			
Root Beer Tapper	Maurice LaMarche	Maurice LaMarche			
Clyde	Kevin Deters	Silent cameo			
Ryu	Kyle Hebert	Kyle Hebert^{A}			
M. Bison	Gerald C. Rivers	Silent cameo			
Ken Masters	Reuben Langdon	Silent cameo			
Yuni Verse	Jamie Sparer Roberts	Silent cameo			
Cyborg	Brian Kesinger				
Zombie	Raymond S. Persi				

== Crew ==
Year	Film(s)	Director(s)	Producer	Screenwriter(s)	Story	Executive Producer(s)	Composer	Editor	Cinematographer(s)
2012	Wreck-It Ralph	Rich Moore	Clark Spencer	Jennifer Lee & Phil Johnston	Rich Moore, Jim Reardon & Phil Johnston	John Lasseter	Henry Jackman	Tim Mertens	Rob Dressel
2018	Ralph Breaks the Internet	Rich Moore & Phil Johnston	Clark Spencer	Pamela Ribon & Phil Johnston	Rich Moore, Jim Reardon, Pamela Ribon, Phil Johnston & Josie Trinidad	John Lasseter, Jennifer Lee & Chris Williams	Henry Jackman	Jeremy Milton	Brian Leach & Nathan Warner

== Reception ==
=== Box office ===
Film	Release date	Box office gross			Box office ranking		Budget	Ref(s)
Film	Release date	North America	Other territories	Worldwide	All time North America	All time worldwide	Budget	Ref(s)
Wreck-It Ralph	November 2, 2012	$189,422,889	$281,800,000	$471,222,889	#216	#216	$165 million	
Ralph Breaks the Internet	November 21, 2018	$201,091,711	$328,109,742	$529,201,453	#201	#189	$175 million	
Total		$390,514,600	$609,909,742	$1,000,424,342			$340,000,000	
List indicators: A dark grey cell indicates the information is not available for the film.^{(A)} indicates the adjusted totals based on current ticket prices (calculated by Box Office Mojo).

=== Critical and public response ===
Film	Critical		Public
Film	Rotten Tomatoes	Metacritic	CinemaScore
Wreck-It Ralph	87% (193 reviews)	72 (38 reviews)	A
Ralph Breaks the Internet	88% (276 reviews)	71 (43 reviews)	A-

=== Accolades ===
Both films were nominated for the Academy Award for Best Animated Feature, but the first film lost to Brave, while the second film lost to Spider-Man: Into the Spider-Verse. The first film won the Critics' Choice Movie Award for Best Animated Feature, and the second film was nominated. Both films were nominated for the Golden Globe Award for Best Animated Feature Film.

== Music ==
The soundtrack to Wreck-It Ralph was released on October 30, 2012.

The soundtrack to Ralph Breaks the Internet was released on November 16, 2018.
