= Captain America: Civil War (soundtrack) =

Captain America: Civil War (Original Motion Picture Soundtrack)

Film score by Henry Jackman
- Released: May 6, 2016
- Genre: Film score
- Length: 69:09
- Label: Hollywood Records

Henry Jackman chronology
The 5th Wave (2016)	Captain America: Civil War (Original Motion Picture Soundtrack) (2016)	The Birth of a Nation (2016)

Captain America: Civil War (Original Motion Picture Soundtrack) is the film score to the Marvel Studios film Captain America: Civil War composed by Henry Jackman. Hollywood Records released the album on May 6, 2016.

== Background ==
In August 2014, directors Anthony and Joe Russo announced that Henry Jackman, who wrote the score for Captain America: The Winter Soldier, would return to write the score for Civil War. Jackman noted that the industrial elements of the track "The Winter Soldier" from the soundtrack to The Winter Soldier was a good indication of what the soundtrack to Civil War would sound like, though he cautioned it was "just a jumping off point since the Russos are looking for something new — similar with a twist." However, Jackman noted that the score for Civil War is more symphonic and orchestral than Winter Soldier.

== Track listing ==
All music composed by Henry Jackman.

No.	Title	Length
1.	"Siberian Overture"	2:56
2.	"Lagos"	2:10
3.	"Consequences"	2:22
4.	"Ancestral Call"	2:37
5.	"Zemo"	3:09
6.	"The Tunnel"	3:51
7.	"Celestial Bodies"	1:44
8.	"Boot Up"	5:16
9.	"A New Recruit"	1:47
10.	"Stepping Up"	1:59
11.	"Standoff"	4:01
12.	"Civil War"	4:26
13.	"Larger Than Life"	3:40
14.	"Catastrophe"	2:36
15.	"Revealed"	5:38
16.	"Making Amends"	1:34
17.	"Fracture"	4:00
18.	"Clash"	3:54
19.	"Closure"	5:32
20.	"Cap's Promise"	3:46
21.	"Adagio" (Bonus track)	2:18
Total length:		69:09

=== Additional music ===
One additional song, "Left Hand Free" by alt-J, is featured in the movie, but was not included on the soundtrack album. It is played when Peter Parker / Spider-Man is first introduced in the film, and during the end credit sequence.

The theme song for the Japanese release of the film is a rerecorded version of "Itsuka Kitto" by EXILE ATSUSHI.

== Charts ==
Weekly chart performance for Captain America: Civil War (Original Motion Picture Soundtrack)
Chart (2016)	Peak position
UK Album Downloads (OCC)	67
UK Soundtrack Albums (OCC)	11
US Billboard 200	168
