= Kick-Ass 2 (soundtrack) =

2013 album by various artists

Kick-Ass 2: Original Motion Picture Soundtrack

Soundtrack album by Henry Jackman
- Released: August 12, 2013 (United Kingdom); August 20, 2013 (United States)
- Genre: Rock; hip-hop; Britpop; electronic; pop
- Length: 41:36
- Language: English
- Label: Sony Music Classical (United Kingdom); Sony Masterworks (United States)
- Producer: Mark Cavell; Claire Dougherty; Ian Neil; David Reid; Isabelle Tulliez

Henry Jackman chronology
Turbo (2013)	Kick-Ass 2: Original Motion Picture Soundtrack (2013)	Captain Phillips (2013)

Kick-Ass 2: Original Motion Picture Soundtrack is the soundtrack album of the 2013 film Kick-Ass 2, consisting of various artists' music. It was released in the United Kingdom on August 12, 2013 by Sony Music Classical, and in the United States on August 20, 2013 by Sony Masterworks. Though the song "I Hate Myself for Loving You" by Joan Jett and the Blackhearts is featured in the film, it does not appear on the soundtrack. Kick-Ass 2: Original Motion Picture Score, featuring the film score by Henry Jackman and Matthew Margeson, was also released in the United States on August 20, 2013 by La-La Land Records.

== Soundtrack ==
=== Track listing ===
No.	Title	Artist	Length
1.	"Yeah Yeah"	James Flannigan	2:12
2.	"Nobody Move" (Dan Auerbach, Bobby Emmett, Patrick Keeler, Hanni El Khatib)	Hanni El Khatib	2:31
3.	"Carry You" (Claude Kelly, Steve Mac)	Union J	3:08
4.	"No Strings" (Chlöe Howells, Francis White)	Chlöe Howl	3:47
5.	"Pussy Drop" (Catherine Huller, Dominic Horgan)	Lemon	3:33
6.	"Dance" (John Calabrese, Danko Jones, Damon Richardson)	Danko Jones	3:28
7.	"A Minha Menina" (Jorge Ben)	The Bees	2:44
8.	"Bust Out Brigade"	The Go! Team	2:43
9.	"When the Saints Go Marching In" (Barrie Gledden, Richard Kimmings, Katherine Purvis)	St. Snot	2:14
10.	"Euphoria, Take My Hand" (James Allan)	Glasvegas	4:33
11.	"Korobeiniki"	Ozma	2:18
12.	"Danger"	Marco Polo and Torae	3:00
13.	"Motherquake" (Diplo, Matt Margenson, Daniel Stein, Dominique Young Unique)	DJ Fresh vs. Diplo featuring Dominique Young Unique	2:05
14.	"Hero" (Cornish, El-Bergamy, Fontaine, Camille Purcell, Lorne Alistaire Tennant)	Jessie J	3:20
Total length:			41:36

=== Reception ===
Heather Phares of Allmusic gave the album a mixed review, comparing it negatively to the original film's soundtrack and noting the soundtrack's lack of flow. She positively noted that it "echoes Kick-Ass' mix of tender and violent music" and called it "a collection with so much energy that its more scattered moments barely matter."

== Score ==
Kick-Ass 2: Original Motion Picture Score

Soundtrack album by Henry Jackman & Matthew Margeson
- Released: August 20, 2013
- Genre: Soundtrack, film score
- Length: 50:01
- Language: English
- Label: La-La Land

=== Track listing ===
All tracks are written by Henry Jackman and Matthew Margeson.

No.	Title	Length
1.	"Main Titles"	1:30
2.	"Senior Year"	2:23
3.	"Honor to Serve Him"	1:07
4.	"Dave's Field Test"	2:34
5.	"Convenience Store"	2:02
6.	"Rich as Shit"	0:53
7.	"Justice Forever"	1:45
8.	"Fat Bouncer Dismissal"	2:19
9.	"First Mission"	2:06
10.	"Toxic Mega-Cunts"	1:18
11.	"Mindy's First Date"	2:54
12.	"Real Evil"	4:10
13.	"Mindy & Dave"	1:37
14.	"Night Bitch Gets It"	1:27
15.	"Remembering Colonel Stars and Stripes"	1:28
16.	"Fatherly Sacrifice"	1:50
17.	"Cemetery Remorse"	0:59
18.	"Cemetery Attack / Hit-Girl Is Back"	4:12
19.	"To Be a Real Superhero"	2:28
20.	"Warehouse Showdown"	5:58
21.	"Shark Bait / Rooftop"	2:45
22.	"Hit Girl's Farewell"	2:16
Total length:		50:01
