= Captain Phillips (soundtrack) =

Captain Phillips (Original Motion Picture Soundtrack)

Film score by Henry Jackman
- Released: October 15, 2013
- Genre: Film score
- Length: 42:55
- Label: Varèse Sarabande
- Producer: Henry Jackman

Henry Jackman chronology
Kick-Ass 2 (2013)	Captain Phillips (2014)	Captain America: The Winter Soldier (2014)

Captain Phillips (Original Motion Picture Soundtrack) is the soundtrack to the 2013 film Captain Phillips directed by Paul Greengrass, starring Tom Hanks as the titular character. Henry Jackman composed the film's musical score, which released on October 15, 2013, through Varèse Sarabande.

== Development ==
Henry Jackman composed the film's score in his first association with Greengrass. Comparing to his previous action films where he used powerful, thematic and operatic materials, the score for Captain Phillips had him refraining them for a minimalistic score which did not influence the audience. He recalled that "Paul Greengrass' take on music is about discipline, minimalism, noninvasive sounds and subtle scores". Due to the film's quasi-realistic nature, he had to use textural and tonal motifs and non-melodic elements to create tension.

In a musical conversation with Jackman and Greengrass, the latter discussed on specific methods that he should avoid while writing the music. Which were to refrain heroic score for the protagonist, the melancholic cues surrounding the crew of the Alabama and Captain Phillips, the archetypal and ethnic musical palette for the Somalis. These were the suggestions, Greengrass provided to Jackman during the music discussions. According to Jackman, he refrained from using traditional elements of the score (harmonies, melodies and theme) as it would take away from the realistic aspects of the filmmaking and leaned on providing more neutral music. "

Jackman worked with cellist Tristan Schulze for the film's score, but he misappropriated on the cello, due to its ethnic sounding, as he did not want to make ethnic music for the Somalis. He further recalled that "there was some ethnicity going on, but via Western instruments, so you didn't know which side of the coin you were on."

== Critical reception ==
In a mixed review, Filmtracks.com described it as "a synthetic score from start to finish, with a few string soloists heavily processed to give the ambience a foreign sound." Todd McCarthy of The Hollywood Reporter wrote "Henry Jackman's electronic score throbs underneath most of the action." Matt Goldberg of Collider and Richard Corliss of Time described it as "relentless". Tampa Bay Times wrote "Henry Jackman's tasteful musical score doesn't announce tension but frequently enhances it, another measure of the movie's effective understatement." Kenji Fujishima of Slant Magazine described it as a "noisy Hans Zimmer-like score".

== Track listing ==
Captain Phillips (Original Motion Picture Soundtrack) track listing
No.	Title	Length
1.	"Choose Your Crew"	1:36
2.	"Maersk Alabama"	2:42
3.	"This Is Not a Drill"	5:42
4.	"Second Attack"	4:53
5.	"I'm the Captain Now"	3:44
6.	"Do We Have a Deal?"	2:09
7.	"Entering the Lifeboat"	2:46
8.	"USS Bainbridge"	2:07
9.	"End This Peacefully"	2:43
10.	"Failed Attempt"	0:56
11.	"Two in the Water"	4:19
12.	"Seals Inbound"	0:23
13.	"Negotiation"	1:23
14.	"Initiate the Tow"	2:17
15.	"High-Speed Maneuvers"	2:03
16.	"Safe Now"	3:12
Total length:		42:55

== Personnel ==
Credits adapted from CD liner notes.

- Henry Jackman – music composer, producer, programming
- Al Clay – additional music composer, producer, programming, recording, mixing
- Jack Dolman – additional music composer, producer, programming
- Alex Belcher – technical engineer
- John Chapman – mixing assistance
- Peter Rotter – music contractor
- Robert Townson – executive producer
- Steven Kofsky – music production services
- Lia Vollack – executive in charge of music (Sony Pictures)
- Nico Abondolo – bass
- Tristan Schulze – cello
- Alan Lightner – percussion
- David Chegwidden – percussion
- Satnam Ramgotra – percussion
- Ann Marie Calhoun – violin

== Accolades ==
Accolades for Captain Phillips (Original Motion Picture Soundtrack)
Award	Category	Recipient(s)	Result	Ref.
British Academy Film Awards	Best Original Music	Henry Jackman	Nominated	
