= This Is the End (soundtrack) =

This Is the End: Original Motion Picture Soundtrack

Soundtrack album by Henry Jackman
- Released: June 11, 2013
- Recorded: 2013
- Genre: Film soundtrack
- Length: 48:43
- Label: RCA

Henry Jackman chronology
G.I. Joe: Retaliation (2013)	This Is the End: Original Motion Picture Soundtrack (2013)	Turbo (2013)

This Is the End: Original Motion Picture Soundtrack is the soundtrack to the 2013 film This Is the End, directed by Seth Rogen and Evan Goldberg. The album featured contributions from Snoop Dogg, Craig Robinson, KRS-One, J-Kwon, K.Flay, Funkadelic, Cypress Hill, Backstreet Boys, Norman Greenbaum and Whitney Houston. It was released on June 11, 2013 by RCA Records.

== Reception ==
Gregory Heaney of AllMusic wrote "What makes the soundtrack work is that, like the film, it helps to set the mood for, it's more about goofy fun than edge-of-your-seat action, and really, if you've got to go out in an extinction-level event, you might as well do it in style." Justin Chang of Variety called it as a "lively soundtrack". Brad McHargue of Dread Central described it as "diverse and exceedingly appropriate".

== Track listing ==
This Is the End: Original Motion Picture Soundtrack track listing
No.	Title	Performer(s)	Length
1.	"Take Yo Panties Off"	Snoop Dogg and Craig Robinson	5:06
2.	"Step into a World (Rapture's Delight)"	KRS-One	4:50
3.	"Tipsy (Club Mix)"	J-Kwon	4:05
4.	"A Joyful Process"	Funkadelic	6:17
5.	"Love in the Old Days"	Daddy	4:18
6.	"When the Shit Goes Down"	Cypress Hill	3:11
7.	"Watchu Want"	Belief and Karniege	2:57
8.	"Easy Fix"	K.Flay	3:36
9.	"Spirit in the Sky"	Norman Greenbaum	3:58
10.	"Everybody (Backstreet's Back)"	Backstreet Boys	3:45
11.	"Please Save My Soul"	Church Friends Choir featuring Pamela Landrum	2:07
12.	"I Will Always Love You"	Whitney Houston	4:33
Total length:			48:43

== Additional music ==
Songs featured in the film, but not in the soundtrack:

- "Gangnam Style" by Psy
- "Hole in the Earth" by Deftones
- "Disco 2000" by Pulp
- "Spiteful Intervention" by Of Montreal
- "Paper Planes" by M.I.A.
- "End of the Beginning" and "War Pigs" by Black Sabbath
- "The Next Episode" by Dr. Dre

== Original score ==
Henry Jackman composed the film's score. Because of the apocalyptic element in the film, the comedy was "actually funnier the more the score commits to how serious the sinkholes and the demons and the purgatory and all the Biblical references and everything are"; as the score becoming more serious, the characters would become funnier. It served as the contradiction to the events and humor featured in the film. Jackman was inspired by Jerry Goldsmith's score for The Omen (1976). Dominic Lewis and Matthew Margeson provided additional materials while Nick Glennie-Smith conducted the orchestral materials.

The score album did not have a separate release in digital and physical formats. A promotional album for the score does exist, according to Soundtrack.Net featuring the complete score. On January 28, 2015, the score was released along with that of his compositions for The Interview (2014) also directed by Rogen and Goldberg.

=== Track listing ===
Promotional album
No.	Title	Length
1.	"Rapture on Melrose"	1:47
2.	"Hills on Fire/The Sinkhole"	3:36
3.	"Foreboding News Report"	0:22
4.	"Can't Sleep"	0:43
5.	"Head Guy"	0:30
6.	"The Sinkhole Remains"	0:35
7.	"This Shit is Biblical"	0:58
8.	"Boredom Montage"	0:36
9.	"Emma Returns"	0:15
10.	"Drawing Matches Part 1"	0:42
11.	"Craig Gets the Water"	1:37
12.	"Creepy Basement Memorabilia"	0:25
13.	"The Devil Rapes Jonah"	1:17
14.	"Drawing Matches Part 2"	1:05
15.	"Jay & Craig Go Outside"	1:22
16.	"Something's Wrong with Jonah"	0:37
17.	"Jonah is Possessed"	0:35
18.	"Demonic Chase Sequence"	4:01
19.	"Lights Out, Jay's Got a Plan"	0:22
20.	"The Exorcism of Jonah Hill"	0:37
21.	"Fire Chase"	1:12
22.	"Craig's Last Stand"	2:15
23.	"Franco's Demise"	1:31
24.	"The Rapture of Seth & Jay"	2:25
Total length:		29:30

CD release (with The Interview)
No.	Title	Length
1.	"Inferno On Melrose"	1:44
2.	"Celebrity Sinkhole"	2:57
3.	"Book Of Revelations"	1:29
4.	"Feeling Horny?"	0:57
5.	"The Exorcism Of Jonah Hill"	3:05
6.	"The Final Rapture"	2:45
Total length:		13:12

=== Accolades ===
Award	Category	Result	Ref(s)
International Film Music Critics Association	Best Original Score for a Comedy Film	Nominated	
