= G.I. Joe: Retaliation (soundtrack) =

G.I. Joe: Retaliation (Original Motion Picture Soundtrack)

Film score by Henry Jackman
- Released: March 19, 2013 (digital); April 9, 2013 (physical)
- Recorded: 2012–2013
- Studios: Newman Scoring Stage, 20th Century Fox Studios, Los Angeles; The Village, Los Angeles; EastWest Studios, Los Angeles; Remote Control Productions, Santa Monica, California
- Genre: Film score
- Length: 55:59
- Label: Varèse Sarabande
- Producer: Henry Jackman

Henry Jackman chronology
Wreck-It Ralph (2012)	G.I. Joe: Retaliation (2013)	This Is the End (2013)

G.I. Joe: Retaliation (Original Motion Picture Soundtrack) is the film score to the 2013 film G.I. Joe: Retaliation directed by Jon M. Chu. Based on the G.I. Joe toy line. It is the second installment in the G.I. Joe film series and the sequel to G.I. Joe: The Rise of Cobra (2009). The film score is composed by Henry Jackman and released through Varèse Sarabande label digitally on March 19, 2013, followed by a physical release on April 9, 2013.

== Background ==
Henry Jackman composed the film score, replacing Alan Silvestri who scored music for The Rise of Cobra. The score was recorded at the Newman Scoring Stage at 20th Century Fox Studios lot, The Village and EastWest Studios. Performed by the 100-member ensemble from Hollywood Studio Symphony, the score was conducted by Nick Glennie-Smith orchestrated by Andrew Kinney, Larry Rench, Stephen Coleman. Varèse Sarabande released the soundtrack digitally on March 19, 2013, and in physical formats on April 9.

== Critical reception ==
Filmtracks wrote "Earning paychecks for this kind of trash is fine, but don't expect to receive any praise for it, other than the instinctive spasms from those in the mainstream who buy rock scores because they can't restrain themselves from leaking their precious bodily fluids while watching such idiotic displays of illogic." Tim Grierson of Screen International called the music as "cutting-edge". Variety's Justin Chang called the score "bombastic".

== Track listing ==
No.	Title	Length
1.	"Prologue"	2:00
2.	"Arashikage"	1:38
3.	"Get Me the GI Joes"	2:34
4.	"Friendly Fire"	1:41
5.	"Exile"	3:34
6.	"Presidential Facade"	2:38
7.	"Einsargen"	2:44
8.	"Making Things Go Boom"	2:10
9.	"Storm Shadow"	2:11
10.	"Bad Dojo"	5:05
11.	"Lady in Red"	3:18
12.	"Fighting Ugly"	1:50
13.	"Fort Sumter"	2:35
14.	"Scare Tactics"	2:29
15.	"I Want It All"	0:51
16.	"End Game"	4:09
17.	"Honor Restored"	2:48
18.	"Firefly"	4:19
19.	"Zartan"	7:25
Total length:		55:59

== Personnel credits ==
Credits adapted from liner notes:

- Music composer and producer – Henry Jackman
- Additional music – Dominic Lewis, Matthew Margeson, Tom Holkenborg, Andrew Kawczynski, Stephen Hilton
- Arrangements – Andrew Kawczynski, Stephen Hilton
- Recording – Alan Meyerson, Dan Kresco, Daniel Pinder, Scott Smith
- Recording assistance – Lori Castro, Nils Montan
- Mixing – Alan Meyerson
- Score editor – Daniel Pinder
- Technical score engineer – Alex Belcher
- Assistant technical score engineer – Ben Robinson, Christian Vorlaender, Jason Soudah, Victoria De La Vega
- Pro-tools operator – Kevin Globerman
- Score coordinator – Frank J. Garcia
- Music coordinator – Jason Richmond
- Executive producer – Robert Townson, Randy Spendlove
- Music production services – Steven Kofsky
- Music preparation – Booker White

Orchestra

- Orchestra – Hollywood Studio Symphony
- Orchestration – Andrew Kinney, Larry Rench, Stephen Coleman
- Conductor – Nick Glennie-Smith
- Contractor – Peter Rotter
- Concertmaster – Bruce Dukov

Instruments

- Bass – Bruce Morgenthaler, Christian Kollgaard, David Parmeter, Drew Dembowski, Michael Valerio, Stephen Dress, Edward Meares
- Cello – Andrew Shulman, Armen Ksajikian, Cecelia Tsan, Dennis Karmazyn, Erika Duke-Kirkpatrick, George Kim Scholes, John Walz, Paula Hochhalter, Timothy Landauer, Timothy Loo, Steve Erdody
- Guitar – George Doering
- Harp – Katie Kirkpatrick
- Horn – Brian O'Connor, Daniel Kelley, David Everson, Jenny Kim, Justin Hageman, Mark Adams, Phillip Yao, Steven Becknell, Jim Thatcher
- Percussion – Vincent Colaiuta
- Trombone – William Reichenbach, Charles Loper, Michael Hoffman, Phillip Teele, Steven Holtman, William Booth, Alexander Iles
- Trumpet – Daniel Fornero, David Washburn, Malcolm McNab, Rick Baptist, Robert Frear, Jon Lewis
- Tuba – Doug Tornquist
- Viola – Alma Fernandez, Andrew Duckles, Darrin McCann, David Walther, Jennie Hansen, Keith Greene, Luke Maurer, Matthew Funes, Robert Brophy, Roland Kato, Shawn Mann, Victoria Miskolczy, Brian Dembow
- Violin – Aimee Kreston, Alwyn Wright, Alyssa Park, Amy Hershberger, Darius Campo, Dimitrie Leivici, Elizabeth Hedman, Eun-Mee-Ahn, Helen Nightengale, Jacqueline Brand, Jay Rosen, Jeanne Skrocki, Jessica Guideri, Josefina Vergara, Katia Popo, Lisa Sutton, Lorand Lokuszta, Marc Sazer, Maya Magub, Natalie Leggett, Neil Samples, Nina Evtuhov, Phillip Levy, Radu Pieptea, Rafael Rishik, Roberto Cani, Roger Wilkie, Sarah Thornblade, Serena McKinney, Shalini Vijayan, Sid Page, Songa Lee, Tamara Hatwan, Tereza Stanislav, Yelena Yegoryan, Julie Ann Gigante

Featured soloists

- Bass – Daniel Pinder
- Drums – Josh Freese, Vincent Colaiuta
- Guitar – Alex Belcher, Daniel Pinder, Joe Perry, Michael Landau
- Strings – George Doering
- Wind instruments – Chris Bleth, Pedro Eustache

== Accolades ==
Awards	Category	Recipient(s) and nominee(s)	Result	Ref.
ASCAP Film and Television Music Awards	Top Box Office Films	Henry Jackman	Won	
