= The Birth of a Nation (soundtrack) =

The Birth of a Nation: Original Motion Picture Score

Film score by Henry Jackman
- Released: October 21, 2016
- Recorded: 2016
- Genre: Film score
- Length: 39:50
- Label: Atlantic
- Producer: Henry Jackman

Henry Jackman chronology
| Captain America: Civil War (2016) | The Birth of a Nation (2016) | Jack Reacher: Never Go Back (2016) |

The Birth of a Nation: Original Motion Picture Score is the score album to the 2016 film of the same name directed by Nate Parker. Henry Jackman composed the film's original score, which was released into a separate album by Atlantic Records on October 21, 2016. Jackman was roped in for the film, when the final cut was almost completed and no studio distributor came forward to finance the film (until Fox Searchlight Pictures distributed the film after the overwhelmingly positive critical reception following the Sundance Film Festival premiere), resulting few monetary constraints with Jackman. However, Parker gave him freedom to use larger score for the film, despite the financing and budget process, which led to an international ensemble collaborating for the film's score. The music received critical acclaim from film critics.

== Development ==
"The Birth of a Nation is a powerful and historical film it almost demands of you as a composer a unique approach because the movie is so unique. Whether it's the theme or the orchestration, you look for the angle and avoid the first thing you can think of. It's like looking under various different stones until you find something you didn't expect. The more unique the film the more the process is demanded from you naturally. As a composer, you should attempt to find your own voice, whether it's the theme, the use of electronics or the type of orchestration. You should just try that as a general."

— Henry Jackman

Henry Jackman was roped in to compose music for the film, after initially discussing with Nate Parker regarding the script and artistic process of the film's music. Despite working on several big-budget films, Jackman was roped in for the film when no studio distributor was attached to fund the project, admitting that "Nate was a man consumed with purpose and whatever was needed to get this film done, he was going to do it. So I was in right away. There was no financing completed, and he didn't even have a studio on board yet, but I knew that Nate was going to make it happen." However, comparing with his score to big-budget films, Jackman felt the only differences are on surface level — the budget, while the process remained the same.

Jackman nearly received a rough cut of the film, which was 85% completed, and Parker did not have an extended cut where he could score music and edit them, as Parker knew what he wanted in production and shot it. He also felt skeptic on Parker's musical ideas which cost them more money. To be creative, Jackman wanted to write a score featuring piano and cello soloists, but Parker wanted symphony orchestra and choir in the third act, similar to that of Braveheart (1995), and would help him figuring out the production costs, which he opined.

This resulted in a collaboration with international ensemble musicians to work on the film's music. British actor and songlist Alex Boyé provided vocals for the score, alongside Peruvian percussionist Alex Acuña. Jackman wanted a gospel choir, not for spirituals but for the "tradition of that style of singing, that culture, gives a sound and a feel that's entirely different from a classically trained choir". The a cappella vocals were recorded by the choir from Wiley College in Marshall, Texas and the One Voice Children's Choir performed the poem adapted from Zulu language.

The temp track for the film consisted of an aggressive action music, and while discussing with Parker, he felt it "really important in the third act of this film, that the nature of the uprising has to feel spiritual and sacrificial [...] it's not really a battle scene, it's a scene about the triumph of enough brave people to stand up against something that is so oppressive that there's no other means". Jackman avoided using an aggressive action music in favor of something religious in character as "when the uprising starts, a more spiritual angle was needed. The important thing was you should never see his vengeance … you shouldn't feel bloodlust. You should be thinking in a slightly more philosophical way that sometimes there is no other option than to have an uprising, and in an uprising there is violence." Hence he made use of choir to help the audience understand that it has nothing to do with vengeance.

== Reception ==
=== Critical response ===
Music critic Jonathan Broxton of Movie Music UK wrote "the score represents the best music of Henry Jackman's career to date. It's not flashy, it doesn't have any kick-ass action sequences, it doesn't have any pulsating themes, and for a great deal of it's [sic] running time it isn't even especially “fun” music due to the poignant emotional nature of the film it accompanies [...] The way he incorporates both African tribal music and choral elements into the score – although it's clearly not a groundbreaking conceptual stretch – nevertheless speaks directly to his main character's two sources of strength: his cultural heritage, and God. Furthermore, the clarity and precision of the stripped-down instrumental textures also indicates, Jackman's increased confidence in his own music. With music like this, which is often unadorned, or limited to just one or two instruments, you can't hide behind walls of orchestration. The melodies and the harmonies have to speak for themselves, and the fact that they can do that here, while also conveying a number of subtly different emotional resonances, is to Jackman's great credit."

James Southall of Movie Wave wrote "it's nice to hear Jackman demonstrating a different side to his musical personality: it might not get any truly memorable moments like these films often do in their scores but it's certainly not overcooked, nor ridden with clichés. The composer manages to successfully convey Turner's faith, his conviction and his inspirational qualities, at the same time as demonstrating an understanding of just how tragic and awful so much of what happened actually was." Todd McCarthy of The Hollywood Reporter wrote "Henry Jackman's score is unusually varied and draws upon multiple musical traditions and references to fine effect." Peter Travers of Rolling Stone said that Jackman's score "pushes when it needs to subtly persuade", while Christopher Orr of The Atlantic criticised the score calling it as "overwrought" at times.

=== Accolades ===
| Award | Date of ceremony | Category | Recipient(s) | Result | Ref. |
|---|---|---|---|---|---|
| Black Reel Awards | February 16, 2017 | Outstanding Original Score | Henry Jackman | Nominated | |
| Hollywood Music in Media Awards | November 17, 2016 | Best Original Score – Feature Film | Henry Jackman | Nominated | |

== Track listing ==
| No. | Title | Length |
|---|---|---|
| 1. | "Prophecy" | 0:58 |
| 2. | "Turner Plantation" | 1:42 |
| 3. | "The Calling" | 1:09 |
| 4. | "A New Chapter" | 1:55 |
| 5. | "Cherry Anne" | 2:43 |
| 6. | "Matrimony" | 1:35 |
| 7. | "The Oppressed" | 1:49 |
| 8. | "The Life of Nat Turner" | 1:53 |
| 9. | "A New Song" | 1:38 |
| 10. | "Serving Master" | 1:25 |
| 11. | "The Remission of Sin" | 1:05 |
| 12. | "Transfiguration" | 1:50 |
| 13. | "A Call to Arms" | 0:49 |
| 14. | "The Reckoning" | 1:57 |
| 15. | "Riotous Dispositio" | 1:48 |
| 16. | "On to Jerusalem" | 6:16 |
| 17. | "Strange Fruit" | 3:33 |
| 18. | "Rite of Passage" | 0:52 |
| 19. | "The Legacy of Nat Turner" | 1:58 |
| 20. | "The Birth of a Nation" | 2:55 |
| Total length: | | 39:50 |
