= Get It Together (Seal song) =

Single by Seal

from the album Seal IV
- Released: 16 December 2002
- Genre: Pop
- Length: 3:59
- Label: Warner Bros.; ZTT; Sire
- Songwriter(s): Seal; Mark Batson
- Producer(s): Trevor Horn; Mark Batson

Seal singles chronology
"My Vision" (2002)	"Get It Together" (2002)	"Love's Divine" (2003)

Music video
- "Get It Together" on YouTube

"Get It Together" is a song by British singer Seal, released on 16 December 2002 as the lead single from his fourth studio album, Seal IV, following the scrapping of Togetherland. The song went to number one on the US dance charts.

== Formats and track listings ==
- CD maxi single
1. "Get It Together" (Lost Boys Radio Edit) – 3:50
2. "Get It Together" (Album Version) – 4:21
3. "Get It Together" (Bill Hamel Vocal Mix) – 10:12
4. "Get It Together" (Junior Jack Mainstream Mix) – 4:06
- US CD maxi single
1. "Get It Together" (Album Version) – 4:25
2. "Get It Together" (Peter Rauhofer Classic Club Mix) – 7:40
3. "Get It Together" (Superchumbo's Guiding Light Mix) – 9:09
4. "Get It Together" (Bill Hamel Vocal Mix) – 10:07
5. "Get It Together" (Wide Horizon Remix) – 8:18
6. "Get It Together" (Roy's Soldiers of Universal Love Remix) – 7:25

== Charts ==
Chart performance for "Get It Together"
Chart (2003–2004)	Peak position
Australia (ARIA)	72
Austria (Ö3 Austria Top 40)	38
Belgium (Ultratop 50 Flanders)	41
Belgium (Ultratop 50 Wallonia)	33
Finland (Suomen virallinen lista)	18
Germany (GfK)	41
Hungary (Editors' Choice Top 40)	18
Netherlands (Single Top 100)	78
New Zealand (Recorded Music NZ)	34
Spain (PROMUSICAE)	15
Sweden (Sverigetopplistan)	23
Switzerland (Schweizer Hitparade)	22
UK Singles (OCC)	25
US Adult Contemporary (Billboard)	29
US Dance Club Songs (Billboard)	1
US Dance/Mix Show Airplay (Billboard)	21

== See also ==
- List of number-one dance singles of 2003 (U.S.)
