= Chlöe Howl =

British singer-songwriter (born 1995)

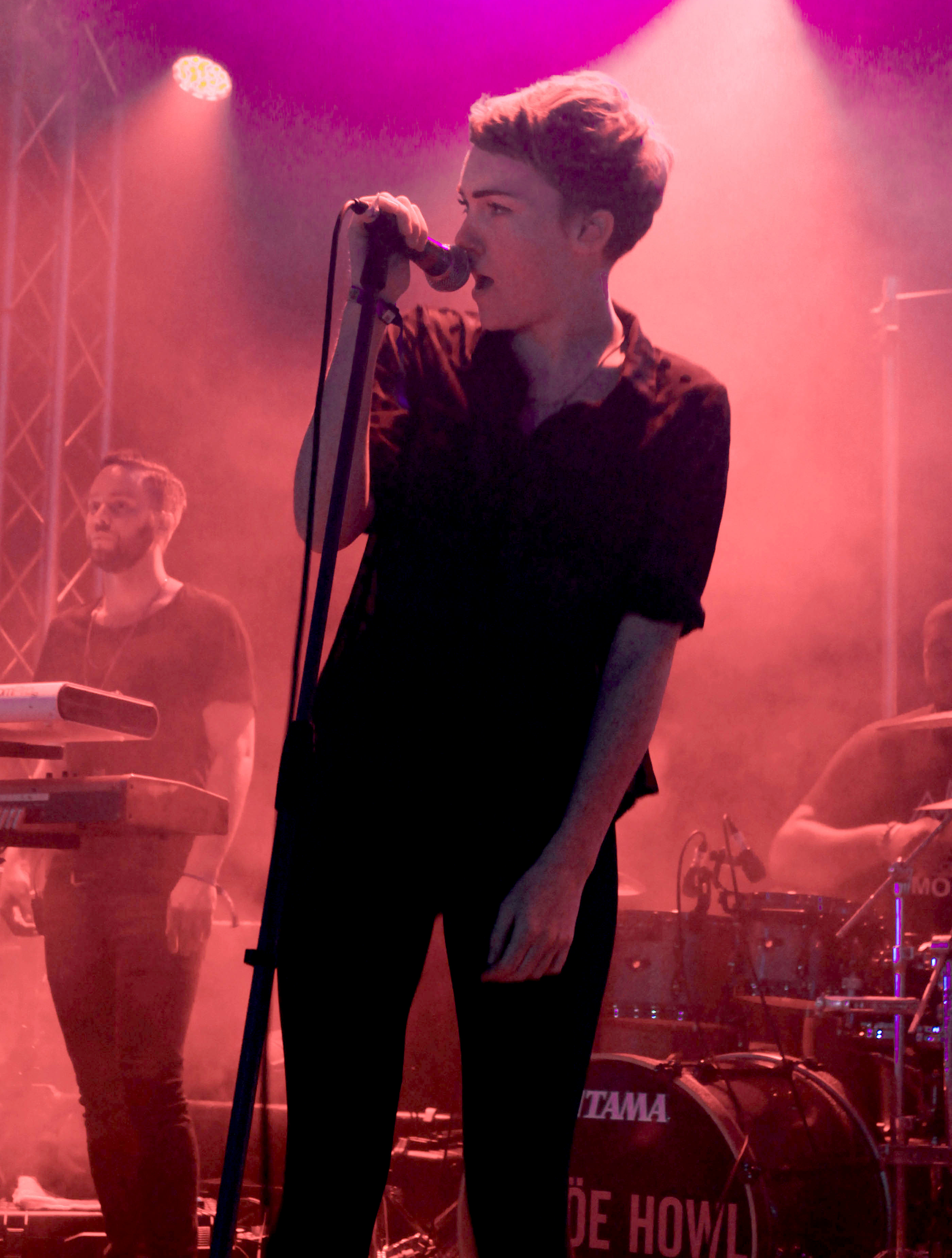
- Howl in 2014

Background information
- Born: Chlöe Louise Howells; 4 March 1995 (age 31); England
- Genres: Electropop; synthpop
- Occupation: Singer-songwriter
- Years active: 2013–present
- Labels: Sony Music; Columbia; Heavenly Songs
- Partner: Kacy Hill (2026)

Chlöe Howl (born Chlöe Louise Howells; 4 March 1995), is a British singer-songwriter. She was shortlisted for the BBC Sound of 2014 and the 2014 BRIT Awards: Critics Choice Award.

== Career ==
=== Early life ===
Chlöe Howl (real name Chlöe Howells) was born on 4 March 1995 in England. The unusual use of the diaeresis above the "o" in her name is said to be a mistake her parents made on her birth certificate. Her father is from Wales and her mother is English. She grew up in the village of Holyport, near Maidenhead, Berkshire. She attended Holyport Primary, and then Altwood Secondary School. At the age of 10 she recorded and sold her own Christmas CD (singing All I Want for Christmas Is You) to help raise funds for her primary school. Howl left school aged 16 and signed a record deal with Columbia Records shortly afterwards. For a brief time she worked in an office, but spent much of the following three years writing and recording songs for her debut album.

=== 2013–present ===
Her first extended play, Rumour, was released for free download on 4 March 2013, her 18th birthday. In June 2013, she released the video for her first single, "No Strings". She released a second extended play No Strings on 26 August. "No Strings" was part of the soundtrack for the movie Kick-Ass 2. On 9 December 2013, her second single "Paper Heart" was released.

On 2 December 2013 she was nominated for the BBC Sound of 2014. On 5 December 2013 she was shortlisted for the 2014 BRIT Awards: Critics' Choice Award, eventually finishing behind Sam Smith. Howl was included in the New Artists 2014 list by iTunes, along with MØ, Sam Smith and Dan Croll. Howl supported Ellie Goulding at some of her 2014 shows in Europe. In March 2014 she released "Rumour" as her third single.

It was expected that her debut studio album Chlöe Howl would be released in 2014 by Columbia Records (Sony Music), but by April 2015 it was being reported that she had left Sony Music. She released a new single "Bad Dream" via the indie label Heavenly Songs in April 2015. In May 2015 she teamed up with fashion house Fendi to model their new range of Orchidea sunglasses. In June 2016 she appeared alongside Ella Eyre in a video promoting the Nintendo 3DS handheld console.

Her single, "Magnetic" was released on 16 June 2017, followed by "Do It Alone" which was released on 26 October 2017. Howl released "Work" on 4 October 2018, the lead single from her EP of the same name, released on 29 November 2018. Howl released "Millionaire" on 7 March 2019. Howl released "In the Middle (Sad Banger)" on 7 June 2019.

== Discography ==
=== EPs ===
Title	Songs	Details
Rumour	"Rumour" "No Strings" "I Wish I Could Tell You"	Released: 5 March 2013; Format: Digital download
No Strings	"No Strings" "How Proud" "No Strings" (Brolin Remix) "No Strings" (Moto Blanco Remix)	Released: 23 August 2013; Format: Digital download
Paper Heart	"Paper Heart" "To My Face" "Paper Heart" (Arches Remix)	Released: 16 December 2013; Format: Digital download
Rumour (US only)	"Rumour" "No Strings" "Paper Heart" "Girls and Boys"	Released: 11 March 2014; Format: Digital download
Work	"Work" "23" "Losing Sleep" "Out of Luck"	Released: 29 November 2018; Format: Digital download

=== Singles ===
==== As lead artist ====
Year	Title	Peak chart positions			Album
Year	Title	UK	FRA	POL	Album
2013	"No Strings"	—	182	—	Chlöe Howl (unreleased)
2013	"Paper Heart"	—	—	—	Chlöe Howl (unreleased)
2014	"Rumour"	84	—	4	Chlöe Howl (unreleased)
2014	"Disappointed"	—	—	—	Chlöe Howl (unreleased)
2015	"Bad Dream"	—	—	—	Chlöe Howl (unreleased)
2017	"Magnetic"	—	—	—	Non-album singles
2017	"Do It Alone"	—	—	—	Non-album singles
2018	"Work"	—	—	—	Work EP
2018	"23"	—	—	—	Work EP
2019	"Millionaire"	—	—	—	Non-album singles
2019	"In the Middle (Sad Banger)"	—	—	—	Non-album singles
"—" denotes a single that did not chart or was not released.

==== As featured artist ====
Year	Title	Album
2014	"Yolanda" (Thumpers featuring Chlöe Howl)	Together EP
2021	"We Were Young" (Shibashi featuring Chlöe Howl)	Shibashi EP

=== Music videos ===
Year	Title	Director	Ref
2013	"No Strings"	Dawn Shadforth	
2013	"Paper Heart"	James Copeman	
2013	"I Wish I Could Tell You"	Dawn Shadforth	
2013	"Rumour"	De La Muerte	
2014	"Disappointed"	Emil Nava	
2017	"Magnetic"	fortyfourfilms	
2017	"Do It Alone"	Temptress	
2018	"Work"	Jessica Belgrave	

== Awards and nominations ==
Year	Award	Category	Recipient	Result	Ref
2014	BBC Sound of...	Sound of 2014	Herself	Nominated	
2014	BRIT Awards	Critic's Choice	Herself	Nominated	
