= Schweetz =

Schweetz may refer to:

- FAO Schweetz, the candy department of FAO Schwarz
- Vanellope von Schweetz, a character from the animated film franchise Wreck-It Ralph
