= This Could Be Heaven =

This Could Be Heaven may refer to:

- This Could Be Heaven (song), a 2001 song by Seal
- This Could Be Heaven (album), a 1997 album by Pandora
