= Seal IV =

Studio album by Seal
- Released: 9 September 2003
- Studios: Sarm West Studios, Sarm Hook End, Angel Recording Studios and Phoenix Studios (London, UK)
- Genres: Soul; pop
- Length: 50:57
- Label: Warner Bros.
- Producers: Trevor Horn; Mark Batson; Seal (exec.); Jill Sinclair (exec.)

Seal chronology
Togetherland (Unreleased)	Seal IV (2003)	Best 1991–2004 (2004)

Singles from Seal IV
- 1. "Get It Together" Released: 16 December 2002; 2. "Love's Divine" Released: 8 May 2003; 3. "Waiting for You" Released: 5 November 2003

Professional ratings
Aggregate scores
Source	Rating
Metacritic	56/100
Review scores
Source	Rating
AllMusic	3/5 stars
Blender	4/5 stars
E!	C
Entertainment Weekly	C
Now	1/5 stars
Q	1.5/5 stars
Rolling Stone	3/5 stars
The Rolling Stone Album Guide	3.5/5 stars
Slant Magazine	3/5 stars
Uncut	4/10

Seal IV is the fourth studio album by Seal. It follows the aborted sessions for Togetherland, which was scrapped because Seal thought it was not up to the standard of his previous work.

In the United Kingdom, the album debuted at number four. In the United States, it debuted at number three on the US Billboard 200, making it his highest-charting album to date.

== Track listing ==
Standard version
No.	Title	Writer(s)	Producer(s)	Length
1.	"Get It Together"	Seal; Mark Batson	Trevor Horn; Batson^{[a]}	4:25
2.	"Love's Divine"	Seal; Batson	Horn; Batson^{[a]}	4:35
3.	"Waiting for You"	Seal; Batson	Horn; Batson^{[a]}	3:44
4.	"My Vision"	Seal; Dave Lee; Rick Salmon; Thomas Newman	Horn	4:48
5.	"Don't Make Me Wait"	Seal; Batson	Horn	4:32
6.	"Let Me Roll"	Seal; Batson	Horn; Batson^{[a]}	3:53
7.	"Touch"	Seal; Batson	Horn; Batson^{[a]}	5:22
8.	"Where There's Gold"	Seal; Batson	Horn; Batson^{[a]}	5:12
9.	"Loneliest Star"	Seal	Horn	4:06
10.	"Heavenly... (Good Feeling)"	Seal; Alan Griffiths	Horn	5:02
11.	"Tinsel Town"	Seal	Horn	5:52
12.	"Get It Together" (Reprise)	Seal; Batson	Horn; Batson^{[a]}	1:06

Australian version bonus track
No.	Title	Writer(s)	Producer(s)	Length
13.	"Love's Divine" (Deepsky club mix)	Seal; Batson	Horn; Batson^{[a]}; Deepsky^{[b]}	8:48

French version bonus track
No.	Title	Writer(s)	Producer(s)	Length
13.	"Les Mots" (duet with Mylène Farmer)	Farmer; Laurent Boutonnat	Boutonnat	4:47

Notes

- ^{^[a]} signifies a co-producer
- ^{^[b]} signifies additional production and remix

== Personnel ==
- Seal – vocals, keyboards (2, 6, 9), bass (4, 9–11), guitars (9, 11)
- Jamie Muhoberac – keyboards (1–12), bass (3, 10), acoustic piano (9, 10)
- Mark Batson – keyboards (1–3, 7–9, 12), acoustic piano (2, 5), bass (2, 3, 6–9), drum programming (3, 6, 7), organ (6)
- Pete Murray – keyboards (1, 5, 12), acoustic piano (2, 5)
- Trevor Horn – acoustic piano (4), guitars (4–6), keyboards (6), bass (5), extra bass (6)
- Carlos Rios – keyboards (11)
- Chris Bruce – guitars (1–4, 6–8, 10, 12), bass (1, 12)
- Tim Cansfield – guitars (1, 2, 5, 12)
- Gus Isidore – guitars (1–3, 7, 10, 12)
- Tim Pierce – guitars (3, 4)
- Alan Griffiths – guitars (10), drum programming (10)
- Steven Shane McDonald – guitars (11)
- Heitor Pereira – guitars (11)
- Earl Harvin – drums (1, 3, 4, 7–10, 12)
- Ian Thomas – drums (2, 5)
- Charlie Russell – drum programming (6)
- Luís Jardim – percussion (1–12)
- Nick Ingman – string arrangements (1, 2, 6, 7, 9–12), choir arrangements (1, 2, 12), orchestral arrangements (5)
- Steve Sidwell – horn and choir arrangements (3), string arrangements (3, 8)
- Gavyn Wright – string leader (1–3, 5–12)
- Tessa Niles – additional backing vocals (1, 12)

=== Production ===
- Jeff Aldrich – A&R
- Seal – executive producer, liner notes
- Jill Sinclair – executive producer
- Robert Orton – engineer (1–12), mixing (1–12)
- Tim Weidner – engineer (1–12), mixing (1–12)
- Steve Price – string recording (1–12), choir recording (1–3), horn recording (3), orchestra recording (5)
- Tim Lambert – assistant engineer (1–12), additional engineer (1, 3, 4, 10)
- Phil Tyreman – assistant engineer (1–12)
- Dan Vickers – additional engineer (4)
- Deepsky – remixing (13)
- Jeffrey Kent Ayeroff – creative director
- Jeri Heiden – art direction
- Glen Nakasako – design
- Robert Maxwell – cover photography
- Sacha Waldman – inside photography
- Irving Azoff, John Baruck, Tom Consolo and Susan Markheim – management

== Charts ==
Chart (2003–2004)	Peak position
Australian Albums (ARIA)	65
Austrian Albums (Ö3 Austria)	7
Belgian Albums (Ultratop Flanders)	37
Belgian Albums (Ultratop Wallonia)	7
Danish Albums (Hitlisten)	17
Dutch Albums (Album Top 100)	7
Finnish Albums (Suomen virallinen lista)	23
French Albums (SNEP)	5
German Albums (Offizielle Top 100)	2
Italian Albums (FIMI)	24
New Zealand Albums (RMNZ)	21
Norwegian Albums (VG-lista)	23
Portuguese Albums (AFP)	4
Swedish Albums (Sverigetopplistan)	2
Swiss Albums (Schweizer Hitparade)	1
UK Albums (Official Charts)	4
US Billboard 200	3

== Certifications ==
Region	Certification	Certified units/sales
Austria (IFPI Austria)	Platinum	30,000^{*}
Canada (Music Canada)	Gold	50,000^{^}
France (SNEP)	Platinum	300,000^{*}
Germany (BVMI)	2× Platinum	400,000^{^}
Portugal (AFP)	Gold	20,000^{^}
Sweden (GLF)	Gold	30,000^{^}
Switzerland (IFPI Switzerland)	Platinum	40,000^{^}
United Kingdom (BPI)	Gold	100,000^{^}
United States (RIAA)	Gold	500,000^{^}
^{*} Sales figures based on certification alone.^{^} Shipments figures based on certification alone.
