= List of Billboard number-one dance singles of 2003 =

Billboard magazine compiled the top-performing dance singles in the United States during 2003 on the Hot Dance Club Play, the Hot Dance Singles Sales, and the Hot Dance Radio Airplay. Premiered in 1976, the Hot Dance Club Play chart ranked the most-played singles on dance club based on reports from a national sample of club DJs. The Hot Dance Singles Sales chart was launched in 1985 to compile the best-selling dance singles based on retail sales across the United States. The Hot Dance Radio Airplay was first published in 2003, ranking the songs based on airplay detections on dance radio.

The airplay chart was unpublished for the first ten weeks and featured 40 titles (it was on its eleventh week when it was included in Billboard's print and online editions), which means that its unofficial start date was August 16, 2003 (the unpublished chart and data would be included in 2018 after Billboard updated the website). Billboard made the chart listing official on October 25, 2003, with 25 titles, which would last until December 2014 when it returned to 40 titles.

== Charts history ==
Chart history
Issue date	Hot Dance Club Play		Hot Dance Singles Sales		Hot Dance Radio Airplay		Ref.
Issue date	Song	Artist(s)	Song	Artist(s)	Song	Artist(s)	Ref.
January 4	"Dark Beat (Addicted 2 Drums)"	Oscar G and Ralph Falcón	"Die Another Day" (Remixes)	Madonna	Not issued		
January 11	"Dark Beat (Addicted 2 Drums)"	Oscar G and Ralph Falcón	"Die Another Day" (Remixes)	Madonna	Not issued		
January 18	"Like I Love You"	Justin Timberlake	"Die Another Day" (Remixes)	Madonna	Not issued		
January 25	"Some Lovin'"	Murk featuring Kristine W	"Die Another Day" (Remixes)	Madonna	Not issued		
February 1	"Surrender"	Laura Pausini	"Die Another Day" (Remixes)	Madonna	Not issued		
February 8	"Through the Rain"	Mariah Carey	"Die Another Day" (Remixes)	Madonna	Not issued		
February 15	"Head"	Thunderpuss and Barnes	"Die Another Day" (Remixes)	Madonna	Not issued		
February 22	"Emotional Rollercoaster"	Vivian Green	"Die Another Day" (Remixes)	Madonna	Not issued		
March 1	"The Wreckoning"	Boomkat	"Through the Rain" (Hex Hector/Mac Quayle Remix)	Mariah Carey	Not issued		
March 8	"Rise Up"	Funky Green Dogs	"Cry Me A River" (Dirty Vegas, J. Fiasco, & B. Hamel Mixes)	Justin Timberlake	Not issued		
March 15	"The Hum Melody"	Robbie Rivera	"Cry Me A River" (Dirty Vegas, J. Fiasco, & B. Hamel Mixes)	Justin Timberlake	Not issued		
March 22	"Dance to the Rhythm"	Friburn & Urik	"Cry Me A River" (Dirty Vegas, J. Fiasco, & B. Hamel Mixes)	Justin Timberlake	Not issued		
March 29	"I Believe"	Chris Cox vs. Happy Clappers	"Cry Me A River" (Dirty Vegas, J. Fiasco, & B. Hamel Mixes)	Justin Timberlake	Not issued		
April 5	"When the Money's Gone"	Cher	"Cry Me A River" (Dirty Vegas, J. Fiasco, & B. Hamel Mixes)	Justin Timberlake	Not issued		
April 12	"Try It on My Own"	Whitney Houston	"If You're Not The One" (Remixes)	Daniel Bedingfield	Not issued		
April 19	"Beautiful"	Christina Aguilera	"If You're Not The One" (Remixes)	Daniel Bedingfield	Not issued		
April 26	"On a High"	Duncan Sheik	"If You're Not The One" (Remixes)	Daniel Bedingfield	Not issued		
May 3	"Gossip Folks"	Missy "Misdemeanor" Elliott featuring Ludacris	"If You're Not The One" (Remixes)	Daniel Bedingfield	Not issued		
May 10	"Walking on Thin Ice"	Ono	"If You're Not The One" (Remixes)	Daniel Bedingfield	Not issued		
May 17	"I'll Be There"	Weekend Players	"American Life"	Madonna	Not issued		
May 24	"Love Is a Crime"	Anastacia	"If You're Not The One" (Remixes)	Daniel Bedingfield	Not issued		
May 31	"American Life"	Madonna	"If You're Not The One" (Remixes)	Daniel Bedingfield	Not issued		
June 7	"Rock Your Body"	Justin Timberlake	"If You're Not The One" (Remixes)	Daniel Bedingfield	Not issued		
June 14	"If That's Love"	Laura Pausini	"If You're Not The One" (Remixes)	Daniel Bedingfield	Not issued		
June 21	"Love That Man"	Whitney Houston	"If You're Not The One" (Remixes)	Daniel Bedingfield	Not issued		
June 28	"Getaway"	Becky Baeling	"Getaway"	Becky Baeling	Not issued		
July 5	"Not Gonna Get Us"	t.A.T.u.	"Stuck" (Thunderpuss Remix)	Stacie Orrico	Not issued		
July 12	"Play Your Part"	Deborah Cox	"Stuck" (Thunderpuss Remix)	Stacie Orrico	Not issued		
July 19	"So Gone"	Monica	"Stuck" (Thunderpuss Remix)	Stacie Orrico	Not issued		
July 26	"Intuition"	Jewel	"Hollywood" (Remixes)	Madonna	Not issued		
August 2	"Alright"	Murk	"Hollywood" (Remixes)	Madonna	Not issued		
August 9	"Pavement Cracks"	Annie Lennox	"Hollywood" (Remixes)	Madonna	Not issued		
August 16	"Pavement Cracks"	Annie Lennox	"Hollywood" (Remixes)	Madonna	"Crazy In Love"	Beyoncé featuring Jay-Z	
August 23	"Hollywood"	Madonna	"Hollywood" (Remixes)	Madonna	"Crazy In Love"	Beyoncé featuring Jay-Z	
August 30	"Sunrise"	Simply Red	"Stuck" (Thunderpuss Remix)	Stacie Orrico	"Crazy In Love"	Beyoncé featuring Jay-Z	
September 6	"Harem"	Sarah Brightman	"Officially Missing You" (Remixes)	Tamia	"Crazy In Love"	Beyoncé featuring Jay-Z	
September 13	"Crazy in Love"	Beyoncé featuring Jay-Z	"Hollywood" (Remixes)	Madonna	"Crazy In Love"	Beyoncé featuring Jay-Z	
September 20	"My Time"	Dutch featuring Crystal Waters	"Hollywood" (Remixes)	Madonna	"Crazy In Love"	Beyoncé featuring Jay-Z	
September 27	"Get It Together"	Seal	"Rubberneckin'" (Paul Oakenfold Remix)	Elvis Presley	"Crazy In Love"	Beyoncé featuring Jay-Z	
October 4	"Get It Together"	Seal	"Sympathy For The Devil" (Remixes)	The Rolling Stones	"Never (Past Tense)"	Roc Project featuring Tina Arena	
October 11	"Into the Sun"	Weekend Players	"Rubberneckin'" (Paul Oakenfold Remix)	Elvis Presley	"Just the Way You Are"	Milky	
October 18	"Send Your Love"	Sting	"Rubberneckin'" (Paul Oakenfold Remix)	Elvis Presley	"Just the Way You Are"	Milky	
October 25	"I Love I Love"	Georgie Porgie	"Rubberneckin'" (Paul Oakenfold Remix)	Elvis Presley	"Just the Way You Are"	Milky	
November 1	"Lei Lo Lai"	The Latin Project	"Rubberneckin'" (Paul Oakenfold Remix)	Elvis Presley	"Just the Way You Are"	Milky	
November 8	"What U Do 2 Me"	Boomkat	"Rubberneckin'" (Paul Oakenfold Remix)	Elvis Presley	"Just the Way You Are"	Milky	
November 15	"This Beat Is"	Superchumbo	"Rubberneckin'" (Paul Oakenfold Remix)	Elvis Presley	"Baby Boy"	Beyoncé featuring Sean Paul	
November 22	"Stand"	Jewel	"Rubberneckin'" (Paul Oakenfold Remix)	Elvis Presley	"Something Happened on the Way to Heaven"	Deborah Cox	
November 29	"Fly Again"	Kristine W	"Rubberneckin'" (Paul Oakenfold Remix)	Elvis Presley	"Something Happened on the Way to Heaven"	Deborah Cox	
December 6	"Milkshake"	Kelis	"Rubberneckin'" (Paul Oakenfold Remix)	Elvis Presley	"Something Happened on the Way to Heaven"	Deborah Cox	
December 13	"Waiting for You"	Seal	"Rubberneckin'" (Paul Oakenfold Remix)	Elvis Presley	"Something Happened on the Way to Heaven"	Deborah Cox	
December 20	"Believe"	Murk	"Rubberneckin'" (Paul Oakenfold Remix)	Elvis Presley	"Something Happened on the Way to Heaven"	Deborah Cox	
December 27	"Me Against the Music"	Britney Spears featuring Madonna	"Nothing Fails" / "Nobody Knows Me"	Madonna	"Something Happened on the Way to Heaven"	Deborah Cox	

== See also ==
- 2003 in music
- List of Billboard Hot 100 number ones of 2003
