= Viva Kids Vol. 1 =

Studio album by Thalía
- Released: March 25, 2014
- Recorded: 2013–2014
- Genre: Latin music, children's music
- Length: 34:15
- Language: Spanish, English
- Label: Sony Music Latin
- Producer: Armando Ávila

Thalía chronology
Thalía (2013)	Viva Kids Vol. 1 (2014)	Amore Mío (2014)

Singles from Viva Kids Vol. 1
- 1. "Vamos A Jugar" Released: March 24, 2014; 2. "Tema De Chupi" Released: April 15, 2014

Viva Kids Vol. 1 is the thirteenth studio album by Mexican recording artist Thalía and her first album meant for children, released on March 25, 2014, by Sony Music Latin. The album consists of 11 tracks, mostly covers of well known children's songs but also includes an original song that Thalía wrote as the theme for her children's book Chupi: The Binky That Returned Home.

On May 29, 2020, she released a sequel album called Viva Kids Vol. 2.

== Background and release ==
The album's lead single was released on March 24, 2014, with the album being released the next day. Thalía said her biggest inspiration for her to record this album were her kids. Thalía also said that the album is something that was born out of a "mischievous moment" she had. Every song is sung in Castilian with the exception of the song Sugar Rush which is an English language cover of the original song by Japanese girl idol group AKB48.

== Promotion ==
Thalía released music videos for every song in the album in order to promote it with the first two being released as singles. In 2013 she also performed the song Tema De Chupi on the TV show Teleton

== Commercial performance ==
The album peaked at number 1 in Mexico and was nominated for Best Latin Children's Album at the Latin Grammy Awards of 2014.

== Track listing ==
No.	Title	Writer(s)	Length
1.	"Tema de Chupi"	Thalía, Armando Ávila y Marcela De la Garza	3:04
2.	"Vamos a Jugar"	Lorenzo Antonio	2:55
3.	"El piojo y la pulga"	Felipe Gil	2:32
4.	"El garabato colorado"	Tulio Arnaldo De Rose y Carlos Luis Sobrino	3:04
5.	"La risa de las vocales"	Tirzo Paiz	2:37
6.	"Caballo de Palo"	Omar Alfano	3:22
7.	"En un bosque de la China"	Roberto Ratto y Benjamín Yankelevich	2:23
8.	"Sugar Rush"	Yasushi Akimoto y James Scoggin	3:14
9.	"Las mañanitas"	D.P.	2:20
10.	"Osito carpintero"	Manuel Esperón y Felipe Bermejo Araujo	2:36
11.	"Estrellita"	Manuel María Ponce Cuéllar	6:04
Total length:			32:51

== Charts ==
=== Weekly charts ===
Chart (2014)	Peak position
Mexican Albums (AMPROFON)	1

=== Year-end charts ===
Chart (2014)	Position
Mexico (Mexican Albums Chart)	89

== Accolades ==
Year	Nominee / work	Award	Result
2014	15th Latin Grammy Awards	Best Children's Album	Nominated
