= Stephen Coleman =

American film orchestrator and conductor

- Occupation: Ochestraror/Conductor
- Website: http://www.stephencoleman.com

Stephen Coleman is an American film orchestrator and conductor. He collaborated with Ramin Djawadi on the Person of Interest soundtrack, and conducted and orchestrated the score of The Predator (composed by Henry Jackman). In 1994, Coleman received a bachelor's degree in Music Composition from New York's Manhattan School of Music.
