= Wreck-It Ralph (soundtrack) =

2012 soundtrack

Wreck-It Ralph: Original Motion Picture Soundtrack

Soundtrack album by Various artists
- Released: October 30, 2012
- Studios: Sony Scoring Stage, Culver City
- Length: 70:36
- Label: Walt Disney
- Producers: Adam Young; Jamie Houston; Skrillex; Carl Sturken; Evan Rogers; Henry Jackman

Henry Jackman chronology
| Abraham Lincoln: Vampire Hunter (2012) | Wreck-It Ralph (2012) | G.I. Joe: Retaliation (2013) |

Wreck-It Ralph: Original Motion Picture Soundtrack is the soundtrack album to the 2012 animated film Wreck-It Ralph. The film's score was composed by Henry Jackman, and the soundtrack featured three original songs and three incorporated songs, with Jackman's score accompanying the remainder of it. Artists featured in the soundtrack are, Owl City, AKB48, Buckner & Garcia, Skrillex, Noisia, Kool & the Gang and Rihanna. The soundtrack was released by Walt Disney Records on October 24, 2012, and received positive reviews from critics.

== Development ==
=== Score ===
On August 20, 2012, Henry Jackman was announced to composed the film's score, making it his second film for Walt Disney Animation Studios after Winnie the Pooh (2011). For the score, Jackman tried to produce 8-bit music (chiptune), as the film and the music goes on the world of arcade games, and the themes were adapted to fit the characters and worlds of retro digital creations and more modern games, including popular video-game franchises of Mario Kart, Halo and Pac-Man etc.

The initial themes were being written on piano, and was followed by which, the score was tailored to infuse synth and electronic instruments being tailored for several sequences. The main theme for "Wreck-It Ralph" was created using an 8-bit orchestra. The score cue to establish Ralph and Vanellope von Schweetz's characters, consisted of emotional beats as Jackman said, "at that point it was not quite so important to be referential in terms of video games. By then, you've accepted them as three-dimensional characters with motivations and aspirations. You don't always want to be bleeping your way through that."

In an interview to Los Angeles Times, Jackman recalled that before getting into video game music, he earlier purchased a vintage Donkey Kong arcade game, which he dismantled later. He further added "I wanted to check the original Namco chips from 1984 to see what the frequency response was. These machines weren't capable of making frequencies higher than such-and-such a note. They weren't able to play more than three sounds at once. I didn't want anyone to be able to go, 'But that sound couldn't have played in those days.' This film is pretty accurate."

A For Your Consideration score album featured Jackman's demos that were not included in the soundtrack. Consisting of 44 tracks, the complete score album was released by Walt Disney Records on December 24, 2012. A private copy of the score was published for the cast and crew, which includes the theme from "Paperman" composed by Christophe Beck, featured in the short film of the same name, that accompanied with Wreck-It Ralph.

=== Songs ===
While majority of the score was written by Jackman, the album also featured six songs: three original and three incorporated tracks. Owl City performed the original track "When Can I See You Again?", which was released on October 18, 2012, as a promotional music video through YouTube. The Japanese-band AKB48 performed the song "Sugar Rush" released as a single on October 22, followed by an independent release in Japan on March 20, 2013. Its music video was screened at the film's world premiere in Los Angeles. Buckner & Garcia performed the song "Wreck-It, Wreck-It Ralph".

The soundtrack also features the songs "Celebration" by Kool & the Gang, "Bug Hunt" (Skrillex and Noisia remix), and "Shut Up and Drive" by Rihanna. The electronic music artist Skrillex had produced the track "Bug Hunt" (Hero's Duty), a remixed version by Noisia was featured in the soundtrack album. Director Rich Moore wanted him for the soundtrack, as in the writing process he wanted to do "something contemporary to other Disney film music" and asked about the same to music supervisor Tom MacDougall, which he named Skrillex for the band. He approved his track, after being impressed with the narration and demos, he came up for the score. Early in the development process, Robert Lopez and Kristen Anderson-Lopez wrote an original song for the film; it was later cut out.

== Reception ==
Heather Phares of AllMusic said "While Wreck-It-Ralph misses out on being a Tron for the preteen set, the soundtrack still scores high when it comes to playfulness and devotion to its subject matter." Joy Of Movies wrote "What starts out as a looser soundtrack, like the film becomes really touching by the end. In this way it mirrors the emotions of the movie and that is exactly what you'd want. The music seems to be pretty much in order here as well which is good. The last three tracks are exciting, touching, and perfect to close out a really fun soundtrack." Filmtracks.com stated "Overall, this wild ride is amusing and entertaining in its parts but difficult to qualify in its whole because the wacky instrumentation really does dominate the structures. You don't leave the score with a clear picture of Jackman's thematic intentions; while the representations exit, they are muddied by the fast pace and inconsistent instrumental colors. As mentioned before, this score is admirably smart enough to earn four stars, but when heard on album, its ultra-frenetic personality and surprisingly elusive themes, along with the mostly original but unrelated and irritating songs (several of which meant for the end credits), pull Wreck-It Ralph back to three-star reality." Alpha and Omega Radio remarked that "here we get to witness the first true marriage of 8-bit sound within the symphonic airwaves courtesy of Henry Jackman. My biggest worry was that the two would cancel each other out, being so different in nature. But thankfully Jackman has found the perfect balance between the two so as not to have one overpower the other". Lipstiq.com wrote "Wreck-It Ralph is certainly a must-have if you're an avid collector of movie soundtracks because you'll never find there is no album like this, especially if you're a hardcore gamer, and you feel like you might need a little backing music to go with your daily adventures!" Screen Rant wrote "the soundtrack proved to be a good blend of catchy songs and original compositions".

== Track listing ==
Wreck-It Ralph: Original Motion Picture Soundtrack
| No. | Title | Writer(s) | Artist | Length |
|---|---|---|---|---|
| 1. | "When Can I See You Again?" | Adam Young; Matt Thiessen; Brian Lee | Owl City | 3:38 |
| 2. | "Wreck-It, Wreck-It Ralph" | Jamie Houston | Buckner & Garcia | 2:59 |
| 3. | "Celebration" | Ronald Bell; Claydes Smith; George Melvin Brown; James "J.T." Taylor; Robert Mickens; Earl Eugene Toon Jr.; Dennis Ronald Thomas; Robert Bell; Eumir Deodato | Kool & the Gang | 3:40 |
| 4. | "Sugar Rush" | Yasushi Akimoto; Jamie Houston | AKB48 | 3:14 |
| 5. | "Bug Hunt (Noisia Remix)" | Skrillex | Skrillex; John C. Reilly | 7:04 |
| 6. | "Shut Up and Drive" | Evan Rogers; Carl Sturken; Stephen Morris; Peter Hook; Bernard Sumner; Gillian Gilbert | Rihanna | 3:32 |
| 7. | "Wreck-It Ralph" | | | 1:33 |
| 8. | "Life in the Arcade" | | | 0:43 |
| 9. | "Jumping Ship" | | | 1:06 |
| 10. | "Rocket Fiasco" | | | 5:48 |
| 11. | "Vanellope von Schweetz" | | | 2:57 |
| 12. | "Royal Raceway" | | | 3:23 |
| 13. | "Cupcake Breakout" | | | 1:12 |
| 14. | "Candy Vandals" | | | 1:39 |
| 15. | "Turbo Flashback" | | | 1:42 |
| 16. | "Laffy Taffies" | | | 1:35 |
| 17. | "One Minute to Win It" | | | 1:17 |
| 18. | "Vanellope's Hideout" | | | 2:33 |
| 19. | "Messing with the Program" | | | 1:20 |
| 20. | "King Candy" | | | 2:11 |
| 21. | "Broken-Karted" | | | 2:49 |
| 22. | "Out of the Penthouse, Off to the Race" | | | 2:51 |
| 23. | "Sugar Rush Showdown" | | | 4:15 |
| 24. | "You're My Hero" | | | 4:16 |
| 25. | "Arcade Finale" | | | 3:19 |
| Total length: | | | | 70:36 |

Wreck-It Ralph: Original Score (For Your Consideration)
| No. | Title | Length |
|---|---|---|
| 1. | "Fix-It Felix" | 1:16 |
| 2. | "Different Worlds" | 2:22 |
| 3. | "Wreck-It Ralph Main Title" | 1:35 |
| 4. | "Bureaucratic Dressing Down" | 0:42 |
| 5. | "Ralph at the Door Sting" | 0:06 |
| 6. | "Cake Remonstration" | 2:04 |
| 7. | "Lost and Found" | 0:28 |
| 8. | "Markowski Panics" | 1:07 |
| 9. | "Reporting for Duty" | 1:09 |
| 10. | "The Beacon" | 1:13 |
| 11. | "Gameplay Gone Wrong" | 0:14 |
| 12. | "Where's Ralph?" | 1:59 |
| 13. | "Rocket to Sugar Rush" | 4:10 |
| 14. | "Vanellope Von Schweetz" | 3:03 |
| 15. | "Cybug Explanation" | 1:52 |
| 16. | "Pay to Play" | 2:26 |
| 17. | "The Glitch" | 1:42 |
| 18. | "Bad Guys Don't Win Medals" | 2:04 |
| 19. | "Discriminating Racers" | 2:02 |
| 20. | "Jawbreaker" | 0:23 |
| 21. | "A Disagreeable Pact" | 2:16 |
| 22. | "NesQuik Sand" | 1:40 |
| 23. | "Bakery Skulking" | 1:12 |
| 24. | "Bake-A-Kart" | 1:21 |
| 25. | "Trombone Fiasco" | 0:12 |
| 26. | "Emotional Biscuits" | 2:27 |
| 27. | "Build a Racetrack" | 2:18 |
| 28. | "Top Shelf" | 0:18 |
| 29. | "Gubbin Tampering" | 1:44 |
| 30. | "One Dynamite Gal" | 2:34 |
| 31. | "The King's Deceit" | 2:53 |
| 32. | "You Really Are a Bad Guy" | 2:54 |
| 33. | "Alone" | 1:13 |
| 34. | "Saccharine Conspiracy" | 2:21 |
| 35. | "Fungeon and Fanfare" | 1:39 |
| 36. | "Mario Karnage" | 2:28 |
| 37. | "Turbo vs Glitch" | 2:57 |
| 38. | "Cybug Invasion" | 1:30 |
| 39. | "No One I'd Rather Be" | 2:45 |
| 40. | "Into the Light" | 1:08 |
| 41. | "Finish Line Transformation" | 1:17 |
| 42. | "Princess Vanellope" | 1:28 |
| 43. | "Wrap-Up" | 1:06 |
| 44. | "Arcade Finale" | 2:12 |
| Total length: | | 83:43 |

Ralph Spaccatutto (Colonna Sonora Originale)
| No. | Title | Writer(s) | Artist | Length |
|---|---|---|---|---|
| 1. | "When Can I See You Again?" | Adam Young; Matt Thiessen; Brian Lee | Owl City | 3:38 |
| 2. | "Wreck-It, Wreck-It Ralph" | Jamie Houston | Buckner & Garcia | 2:59 |
| 3. | "Celebration" | Ronald Bell; Claydes Smith; George Melvin Brown; James "J.T." Taylor; Robert Mickens; Earl Eugene Toon Jr.; Dennis Ronald Thomas; Robert Bell; Eumir Deodato | Kool & the Gang | 3:40 |
| 4. | "Sugar Rush" | Yasushi Akimoto; Jamie Houston | AKB48 | 3:14 |
| 5. | "Bug Hunt (Noisia Remix)" | Skrillex | Skrillex; John C. Reilly | 7:04 |
| 6. | "Shut Up and Drive" | Evan Rogers; Carl Sturken; Stephen Morris; Peter Hook; Bernard Sumner; Gillian Gilbert | Rihanna | 3:32 |
| 7. | "Ralph Spaccatutto" | | | 1:33 |
| 8. | "Vita In Sala Giochi" | | | 0:43 |
| 9. | "Abbandonare La Nave" | | | 1:06 |
| 10. | "Rocket Fiasco" | | | 5:48 |
| 11. | "Vanellope von Schweetz" | | | 2:57 |
| 12. | "Pista Regale" | | | 3:23 |
| 13. | "Fuga Dal Bigne'" | | | 1:12 |
| 14. | "Vandali Canditi" | | | 1:39 |
| 15. | "Turbo Flashback" | | | 1:42 |
| 16. | "Lacci Gommosi" | | | 1:35 |
| 17. | "Un Minuto Per Vincere" | | | 1:17 |
| 18. | "La Tana / Il Covo Di Vanellope" | | | 2:33 |
| 19. | "Manomissione Del Programma" | | | 1:20 |
| 20. | "Re Candito" | | | 2:11 |
| 21. | "Rompi-Kart" | | | 2:49 |
| 22. | "Fuori Dal Superattico, Giu' In Pista" | | | 2:51 |
| 23. | "Sugar Rush Showdown" | | | 4:15 |
| 24. | "Sei Il Mio Eroe" | | | 4:16 |
| 25. | "Finale Sala Giochi" | | | 3:19 |
| Total length: | | | | 70:36 |

Les mondes de Ralph (Musique instrumentale originale)
| No. | Title | Writer(s) | Artist | Length |
|---|---|---|---|---|
| 1. | "When Can I See You Again?" | Adam Young; Matt Thiessen; Brian Lee | Owl City | 3:38 |
| 2. | "Wreck-It, Wreck-It Ralph" | Jamie Houston | Buckner & Garcia | 2:59 |
| 3. | "Celebration" | Ronald Bell; Claydes Smith; George Melvin Brown; James "J.T." Taylor; Robert Mickens; Earl Eugene Toon Jr.; Dennis Ronald Thomas; Robert Bell; Eumir Deodato | Kool & the Gang | 3:40 |
| 4. | "Sugar Rush" | Yasushi Akimoto; Jamie Houston | AKB48 | 3:14 |
| 5. | "Bug Hunt (Noisia Remix)" | Skrillex | Skrillex; John C. Reilly | 7:04 |
| 6. | "Shut Up and Drive" | Evan Rogers; Carl Sturken; Stephen Morris; Peter Hook; Bernard Sumner; Gillian Gilbert | Rihanna | 3:32 |
| 7. | "Ralph La Casse" | | | 1:33 |
| 8. | "La Vie De L'Arcade" | | | 0:43 |
| 9. | "Le Vaisseau Sauteur" | | | 1:06 |
| 10. | "Lancement Raté" | | | 5:48 |
| 11. | "Vanellope von Schweetz" | | | 2:57 |
| 12. | "Circuit Royal" | | | 3:23 |
| 13. | "Sortie de Brioche" | | | 1:12 |
| 14. | "Casser Du Sucre" | | | 1:39 |
| 15. | "Turbo Flashback" | | | 1:42 |
| 16. | "Lianes Qui Rient" | | | 1:35 |
| 17. | "Une Minute Pour Gagner" | | | 1:17 |
| 18. | "Le Repaire De Vanellope" | | | 2:33 |
| 19. | "Jouer Avec Le Programme" | | | 1:20 |
| 20. | "Sa Sucrerie" | | | 2:11 |
| 21. | "Kart Brisé" | | | 2:49 |
| 22. | "Du Loft Au Circuit" | | | 2:51 |
| 23. | "Sugar Rush, L'Epreuve" | | | 4:15 |
| 24. | "Tu Es Mon Héros" | | | 4:16 |
| 25. | "Arcade Finale" | | | 3:19 |
| Total length: | | | | 70:36 |

== Charts ==
| Chart (2013) | Peak position |
|---|---|
| UK Soundtrack Albums (OCC) | 17 |
| US Billboard 200 | 25 |
| US Soundtrack Albums (Billboard) | 13 |

== Accolades ==
| Award | Category | Recipients | Result |
|---|---|---|---|
| Annie Awards | Music in an Animated Feature Production | Henry Jackman, Skrillex, Adam Young, Matthew Thiessen, Jamie Houston, Yasushi Akimoto | Won |
