= Waiting for You (Seal song) =

Single by Seal

from the album Seal
- Released: November 5, 2003
- Recorded: 2003
- Genre: Pop; adult contemporary
- Length: 3:39
- Label: ZTT; Warner UK; Sire
- Songwriters: Mark Batson; Seal
- Producers: Trevor Horn; Mark Batson

Seal singles chronology
"Love's Divine" (2003)	"Waiting for You" (2003)	"Walk On By" (2004)

Licensed audio
- "Waiting for You" on YouTube

"Waiting for You" is a song by Seal. It was released as the final single from his fourth studio album Seal IV.

== Formats and track listings ==
US maxi CD-single

1. "Waiting for You" (Burnin' Thick D. vocal remix) – 7:42
2. "Waiting for You" (The Passengerz remix) – 7:09
3. "Waiting for You" (BHQ vocal remix) – 7:22
4. "Waiting for You" (Machine Head remix) – 5:29
5. "Waiting for You" (29 Palms remix) – 8:15

International CD-single

1. "Waiting for You" (album version) – 3:44
2. "Loneliest Star" (album version) – 4:04

UK 12" promo

1. "Waiting for You" (Thick D. vocal mix) – 7:45
2. "Waiting for You" (Machine Head remix) – 5:59
3. "Waiting for You" (29 Palms remix) – 8:18

UK 2x12"

- A1 "Waiting for You" (Burnin' Thick D. vocal remix) – 7:45
- A2 "Waiting for You" (Machine Head remix) – 5:29
- B1 "Waiting for You" (The Passengerz remix) – 7:11
- B2 "Waiting for You" (BHQ vocal remix) – 7:24
- C1 "Waiting for You" (Burnin' Thick D. dub) – 7:31
- C2 "Waiting for You" (The Passengerz dub) – 6:56
- D1 "Waiting for You" (29 Palms remix) – 7:00
- D2 "Waiting for You" (BHQ dub) – 7:30

UK CD-single

1. "Waiting for You" – 3:39
2. "Love's Divine" – 4:35

== Charts ==
Chart (2004)	Peak position
U.S. Billboard Hot 100	89
U.S. Billboard Adult Contemporary	20
U.S. Billboard Hot Dance Club Play	1
U.S. Billboard Hot Dance Airplay	15
UK Singles Chart	80

== See also ==
- List of number-one dance singles of 2003 (U.S.)
