= Viva Kids Vol. 2 =

Studio album by Thalía
- Released: May 29, 2020
- Recorded: 2020
- Genre: Latin music, Children's music
- Length: 39:07
- Language: Spanish
- Label: Sony Music Latin
- Producer: Armando Ávila

Thalía chronology
Valiente (2018)	Viva Kids Vol. 2 (2020)	Desamorfosis (2021)

Singles from Viva Kids Vol. 2
- 1. "Mi No Cumpleaños" Released: May 29, 2020; 2. "Mis Tradiciones" Released: May 30, 2020

Viva Kids Vol. 2 is the seventeenth studio album by Mexican recording artist Thalía, and her second children-oriented album, released on May 29, 2020 by Sony Music Latin. The album consists of 15 tracks of which all are new children's songs written by Thalía. The album is a sequel to her 2014 children's album Viva Kids Vol. 1.

== Background and release ==
On May 26, 2020 Thalía announced through animated videos that she was working on Viva Kids Vol. 2, the continuation of her children's music project inspired by her children, whose she had collaboration in the album, according to the singer: "We were writing the album to release it at the time of the wise men, but being quarantined we finished it and we are happy to give you this fun in these strange moments" The album was first teased a week before its release on Thalía's Instagram, three days before the album's release it was then confirmed that it would be released on May 29, 2020. Unlike its first edition, Viva Kids Vol. 2 is an album of 15 completely original songs, composed by Thalía herself together with Marcela De La Garza and produced by Armando ”Ávila, two of the songs were co-written by her kids. Thalía had actually planned to release her urban pop studio album first and not release Viva Kids Vol. 2 until January 2021 but decided to switch the dates due to the coronavirus pandemic.

== Promotion ==
Thalía released music videos for every song in the album in order to promote the album. The first single “Mi No Cumpleaños” was released with a music video the same day as the album's release. Thalía also formed an alliance with Discovery Kids in which the album's song videos would play during their programming and also be available on the app Discovery Kids Plus.

== Track listing ==
Digital Download album
No.	Title	Length
1.	"Mi No Cumpleaños"	2:21
2.	"La Canción de la Efe"	2:12
3.	"Salto"	2:36
4.	"Iuuuuu"	2:47
5.	"La Vacuna"	3:03
6.	"Una Cucaracha"	1:59
7.	"No Quiero Venduras"	2:27
8.	"Es un Pedo"	2:39
9.	"Diente"	2:16
10.	"No Se Trata de Ganar"	2:22
11.	"Los Reyes Magos"	3:00
12.	"Yo Puedo Sola"	2:17
13.	"Miedo-Terror"	2:20
14.	"Mis Tradiciones"	2:28
15.	"A Dormir"	4:20
