= No Strings (song) =

Single by Chlöe Howl

from the album Chlöe Howl (unreleased)
- Released: 23 August 2013
- Genre: Pop, synthpop
- Length: 3:47
- Label: Sony Music
- Songwriters: Chlöe Howl; Francis White
- Producer: Eg White

Chlöe Howl singles chronology
"No Strings" (2013)	"Paper Heart" (2013)

"No Strings" is the debut single by British singer-songwriter Chlöe Howl. It was released on 23 August 2013, through Sony Music Entertainment. The song entered the UK Singles Chart at number 176 on 1 September 2013. The song has peaked at number 182 on the French Singles Chart. The song was written by Chlöe Howl and Francis White. It was used as part of the Kick-Ass 2 movie soundtrack.

== Music video ==
A music video to accompany the release of "No Strings" was first released onto YouTube on 16 June 2013 at a total length of three minutes and fifty-six seconds.

== Track listing ==
Digital download - EP
No.	Title	Length
1.	"No Strings"	3:47
2.	"How Proud"	4:04
3.	"No Strings" (Brolin Remix)	4:22
4.	"No Strings" (Moto Blanco Remix)	6:50

== Charts ==
Chart (2013)	Peak position
France (SNEP)	182

== Release history ==
Region	Date	Format	Label
United Kingdom	23 August 2013	Digital download	Sony Music Entertainment
