= Love's Divine =

Single by Seal

from the album Seal IV
- Released: 8 May 2003
- Recorded: 2003
- Genre: R&B
- Length: 4:35
- Label: ZTT; Warner UK; Sire
- Songwriters: Mark Batson; Sealhenry Samuel
- Producers: Trevor Horn; Mark Batson

Seal singles chronology
"Get It Together" (2002)	"Love's Divine" (2003)	"Waiting for You" (2003)

"Love's Divine" is a song by Seal. It was released as the second single from his fourth studio album Seal IV. The official music video was directed by Sanji and stars Ukrainian model/actress Olga Kurylenko in her first acting role. The song is written in F sharp minor.

== Formats and track listings ==
Maxi CD single

1. "Love's Divine" (album version) – 4:35
2. "Love's Divine" (Passangerz Sanctuary club mix) – 8:56
3. "Love's Divine" (Deepsky edit) – 4:32
4. "Love's Divine" (Passengerz Divine radio mix) – 3:55

CD single

1. "Love's Divine" (album version) – 4:35
2. "Love's Divine" (Passangerz Sanctuary club mix) – 8:56

== Charts ==
=== Weekly charts ===
Chart (2003–04)	Peak position
Austria (Ö3 Austria Top 40)	11
Belgium (Ultratip Bubbling Under Flanders)	10
Belgium (Ultratop 50 Wallonia)	5
Croatia (HRT)	7
France (SNEP)	4
Germany (GfK)	4
Italy (FIMI)	25
Netherlands (Single Top 100)	68
New Zealand (Recorded Music NZ)	34
Poland (Polish Airplay Chart)	7
Scotland Singles (OCC)	78
Spain (Promusicae)	13
Sweden (Sverigetopplistan)	43
Switzerland (Schweizer Hitparade)	4
UK Singles (OCC)	68
US Billboard Hot 100	79
US Adult Contemporary (Billboard)	3
US Adult Pop Airplay (Billboard)	22
US Dance Club Songs (Billboard)	1
US Dance/Mix Show Airplay (Billboard)	8

=== Year-end charts ===
Chart (2003)	Position
France (SNEP)	61
Germany (Media Control GfK)	40
Switzerland (Schweizer Hitparade)	64

Chart (2004)	Position
Austria (Ö3 Austria Top 40)	57
Belgium (Ultratop 50 Wallonia)	43
France (SNEP)	76
Germany (Media Control GfK)	46
Switzerland (Schweizer Hitparade)	36
US Adult Contemporary (Billboard)	11

== Cover versions ==
- Brazilian band Babado Novo recorded a version for the 2004 DVD, Uau! Ao Vivo em Salvador. The song is also on the extended play, Uau! Babado Novo Ao Vivo.
