= Captain America: The Winter Soldier (soundtrack) =

Captain America: The Winter Soldier (Original Motion Picture Soundtrack)

Film score by Henry Jackman
- Released: April 1, 2014
- Recorded: 2013
- Studio: Air Studios (London)
- Genre: Film score
- Length: 1:14:32
- Labels: Hollywood; Marvel Music
- Producers: Henry Jackman; Al Clay

Henry Jackman chronology
Captain Phillips (2013)	Captain America: The Winter Soldier (Original Motion Picture Soundtrack) (2014)	Big Hero 6 (2014)

Captain America: The Winter Soldier (Original Motion Picture Soundtrack) is the film score for the Marvel Studios film, Captain America: The Winter Soldier by Henry Jackman, which was released by Hollywood Records on April 1, 2014.

== Background ==
In June 2013, Henry Jackman officially announced himself as the composer for Captain America: The Winter Soldier. After spending around six months writing music for the film, Jackman recorded the album at Air Studios in London during the latter part of 2013. About the score Jackman said, "...it's 50% production and all the tricks I've learnt from spending years in the record industry but then it's also got the kind of injection of symphonic, thematic, heroic music that all kind of merges into one musical, and hopefully coherent piece".

While the beginning of the film contains Alan Silvestri's themes from Captain America: The First Avenger, these cues are absent on the soundtrack album.

== Track listing ==
All music is composed by Henry Jackman, except where indicated.

No.	Title	Writer(s)	Artist(s)	Length
1.	"Lemurian Star"			3:06
2.	"Project Insight"			1:29
3.	"The Smithsonian"			1:36
4.	"An Old Friend"			3:05
5.	"Fury"			4:07
6.	"The Winter Soldier"			6:24
7.	"Fallen"			2:51
8.	"Alexander Pierce"			2:58
9.	"Taking a Stand"			2:07
10.	"Frozen in Time"			3:52
11.	"Hydra"			6:46
12.	"Natasha"			1:12
13.	"The Causeway"			2:41
14.	"Time to Suit Up"			2:05
15.	"Into the Fray"			6:05
16.	"Countdown"			4:26
17.	"End of the Line"			2:51
18.	"Captain America"			9:41
19.	"It's Been a Long, Long Time"	Jule Styne; Sammy Cahn	Harry James and His Orchestra, featuring Kitty Kallen	3:23
20.	"Trouble Man"	Marvin Gaye	Marvin Gaye	3:47
Total length:				1:14:32

== Reception ==
Professional ratings
Review scores
Source	Rating
Movie Music UK	(negative)
Movie Wave	0/5 stars
Soundtrack Geek	54.4/100
Entertainment Junkie	42/100
Filmtracks	2/5 stars

The score received overwhelmingly negative reviews from critics, with much of the criticism being directed towards Jackman's overuse of electronic sounds and the absence of Alan Silvestri's themes from Captain America: The First Avenger.

Jørn Tillnes, writing for Soundtrack Geek, dismissed the score as "weird", stating "What I wanted was the Silvestri score + added badass-ness, but instead I got weirdness. Even if the score wasn't as expected, this would still come across as a weird score to me and I just don't like it very much." James Southall of Movie Wave said that the album "starts badly and proceeds to get much worse", ultimately giving the score a rating of no stars out of five. Jonathan Broxton of Movie Music UK called it "one of the most grating, themeless, emotionally barren scores I have had the misfortune of hearing in several years. The words "clichéd" and "generic" could have been invented specifically for this score, which takes all the worst aspects of modern film scoring and amplifies them a hundredfold, reveling in their lack of coherent musical ideas, individual identities, and musical inventiveness."

The score was heavily criticized for its similarity to the work of composer Hans Zimmer, with Broxton stating "Jackman's theme is so nondescript, it could be from any superhero or action movie from the past 20 years, and the action rhythms and percussive patterns Jackman employs sound like all the other action rhythms and percussive patterns everyone from Hans Zimmer down has used for the past decade." Southall wondered "When will filmmakers grow a pair of balls and reject this sort of approach to their films – when will they say that no thanks, we don't want you to sound like a fourth-rate Hans Zimmer impersonator, we want you to sound like you."

Callum Hofler of Entertainment Junkie gave the score a negative review, stating "Despite the glorious highlights of this score, Captain America: The Winter Soldier indulges in some dreadful, unforgiving music, that doesn't deserve any of your time, and more importantly, your money." He awarded it a rating of 4.2 out of 10.

== Charts ==
Weekly chart performance for Captain America: The Winter Soldier (Original Motion Picture Soundtrack)
Chart (2014)	Peak position
UK Soundtrack Albums (OCC)	24
US Soundtrack Albums (Billboard)	13
