= This Could Be Heaven (song) =

Single by Seal

from the album Togetherland and The Family Man: Music from the Motion Picture
- Released: 16 February 2001
- Recorded: 2000
- Genre: Soul; pop
- Label: Sire
- Songwriter(s): Seal; Guy Gershoni; Henry Jackman; Dave Palmer
- Producer(s): Seal; Henry Jackman

Seal singles chronology
"Lost My Faith" (1999)	"This Could Be Heaven" (2001)	"Les Mots" (2001)

Licensed audio
- "This Could Be Heaven" on YouTube

"This Could Be Heaven" is a song by British singer Seal, originally recorded in 2000 for his scrapped fourth studio album, Togetherland.

== Background ==
Togetherland was scrapped after it was rejected by Seal's record company, as they believed the album would not be commercially successful. However, two songs from the project were officially released. One of them, "This Could Be Heaven," appeared on the soundtrack for the film The Family Man. The song was released as a single in support of the soundtrack in 2001. The other track, "Breathe," was re-recorded and released as "Whatever You Need," a bonus track on Seal's ninth studio album, 7.

There are two versions of the song, with five different edits of the final version circulating. The first version is an early recording that runs for 3:30, with a more simple arrangement and different chords. Thirty seconds of this early version circulated, along with thirty-second snippets of all songs on the album, as a Togetherland preview, when the album was still due to be released. The second, subtitled "FM edit", is an edit of the final version, and runs for 4:29. Both were not officially released, only being streamed, along with Togetherland tracks "Elise", "All That I Wanted to Say", and "Love Is Better", on the song's co-author, orchestra arranger and producer Henry Jackman's website, which is currently unavailable.

== Critical reception ==
According to Billboard, "In the forefront of 'This Could Be Heaven' is Seal's instantly recognizable voice, brimming with emotion that reaches out for true love", adding that "[i]nstrumentally, 'Heaven' keeps it fairly restrained, with a slowly building swirl of strings, electric guitars, and drums that envelop Seal's increasingly dramatic vocal delivery."

== Versions ==
1. "This Could Be Heaven" (radio edit) – 4:04
2. "This Could Be Heaven" (LP version) – 5:06
3. "This Could Be Heaven" (The Family Man soundtrack version) – 4:43
4. "This Could Be Heaven" (acoustic version) – 4:02

== Charts ==
Chart performance for "This Could Be Heaven"
Chart (2001)	Peak position
Italy (FIMI)	27
Netherlands (Single Top 100)	88
New Zealand (Recorded Music NZ)	39
US Adult Contemporary (Billboard)	23
