= When Can I See You Again? =

Song by Owl City

from the album Wreck-It Ralph: Original Motion Picture Soundtrack
- Released: October 6, 2012
- Genre: Dance-pop; synth-pop; EDM
- Length: 3:40
- Label: Walt Disney/Universal Republic Records
- Songwriters: Adam Young; Matt Thiessen; Brian Lee
- Producer: Adam Young

Music video
- "When Can I See You Again? (From Wreck it Ralph)" on YouTube

"When Can I See You Again?" is a song by American electronica project Owl City from the 2012 Walt Disney Animation Studios film Wreck-It Ralph. It was written and produced by Adam Young, with additional writing from Matt Thiessen and Brian Lee. The song was made available for streaming on October 6, 2012 via AOL Music.

== Background ==
Following the success of his 2012 hit, "Good Time", with Carly Rae Jepsen, Disney reached out to Adam Young to contribute a song to Wreck-It Ralph. Tom MacDougall stated that he chose Owl City because his music, "felt very much in sync with videogames."

== Composition and lyrics ==
"When Can I See You Again?" is an uptempo dance-pop and synth-pop single. It features Young's "light vocals over a bed of pounding drums and twinkly synths". Young told AOL Music, "As a huge fan of Disney animation films growing up, it was a real honor to write 'When Can I See You Again' for Wreck-It Ralph. I felt like it was really challenging to try to live up to the Disney legacy. I had a blast." Since October 1, 2014, a Cantonese-language arrangement has been used as one of the two theme songs for Hong Kong Disneyland's Paint the Night Parade, alongside "Baroque Hoedown". An expanded version of the parade premiered at Disneyland in Anaheim, California, on May 22, 2015, and features new lyrics and vocals recorded by Young.

== Music video ==
The music video for the song includes Young singing in front of an arcade game.

The music video for "When Can I See You Again?" was released on October 26, 2012, and directed by Matt Stawski. It features "fun video game themes" and clips from Wreck-It Ralph. Young told AOL Music, "The funniest thing has been actually standing in front of the arcade game with controls, putting the quarter in. It's great to be back and feel like I'm 12 years old again in the arcade."

== Awards and nominations ==
Awards and nominations for "When Can I See You Again?"
Year	Organization	Award	Result	Ref(s)
2012	Phoenix Film Critics Society Awards	Best Original Song	Nominated	

== Charts ==
=== Weekly charts ===
Weekly chart performance for "When Can I See You Again?"
Chart (2012–13)	Peak position
Canada (Canadian Hot 100)	78
Japan (Japan Hot 100)	100
US Bubbling Under Hot 100 Singles (Billboard)	11
US Digital Songs (Billboard)	60
US Kid Digital Song Sales (Billboard)	1

=== Year-end charts ===
Year-end chart performance for "When Can I See You Again?"
Chart (2013)	Position
US Kid Digital Song Sales (Billboard)	1
Chart (2014)	Position
US Kid Digital Song Sales (Billboard)	5
Chart (2015)	Position
US Kid Digital Song Sales (Billboard)	16

== Certifications ==
Certifications for "When Can I See You Again?"
Region	Certification	Certified units/sales
New Zealand (RMNZ)	Gold	15,000^{‡}
United Kingdom (BPI)	Silver	200,000^{‡}
United States (RIAA)	Platinum	1,000,000^{‡}
^{‡} Sales+streaming figures based on certification alone.
