= Sugar Rush (AKB48 song) =

Song by AKB48

from the album Wreck-It Ralph
- Language: Japanese, English
- Published: Walt Disney Music Company
- Released: USA: October 30, 2012; Japan: March 20, 2013
- Genre: J-pop, teen pop,
- Length: 3:14
- Label: Walt Disney
- Composer: Jamie Houston
- Lyricist: Yasushi Akimoto

AKB48 chronology
Gingham Check (2012)	Sugar Rush (2012)	Uza (2012)

Music video
- "Sugar Rush" on YouTube

"Sugar Rush" is a song by the Japanese girl idol group AKB48. It was released on October 30, 2012, on the original soundtrack of Wreck-It Ralph, which is titled Sugar Rush (シュガー・ラッシュ) in Japanese.

== Background ==
The song was written for the Disney animation film Wreck-It Ralph and chosen as the ending theme for its worldwide release.

== AKB48 members who participated ==
The song features 10 AKB48 members:

- Team A: Mariko Shinoda, Rina Kawaei, Minami Takahashi, Mayu Watanabe
- Team K: Tomomi Itano, Yuko Oshima
- Team B: Yuki Kashiwagi, Haruka Shimazaki, Haruna Kojima
- SKE48 Team S: Jurina Matsui

== Writing credits ==
- Lyrics: Yasushi Akimoto
- Music: Jamie Houston

== Music video ==
The music video was directed by Japanese photographer and filmmaker Mika Ninagawa, notably the director of another AKB48's music video, "Heavy Rotation".

The video was premiered on October 29, 2012, at the world premiere of the movie, which took place in Los Angeles.

== Charts ==
Chart (2013)	Peak position
Billboard Japan Hot Animation	11

== Covers ==
In 2014, Mexican singer Thalía recorded an English language cover of the song for her first children's album Viva Kids Vol. 1. A music video was released which features Thalía in an animated candyland.
