= Altwood Church of England School =

Location
- Altwood Road; Maidenhead, Berkshire, SL6 4PU; England; 51.516074°N 0.750992°W

Information
- Type: Academy
- Motto: I am known, I am valued, I will succeed
- Religious affiliation: Church of England
- Established: 1907
- Local authority: Royal Borough of Windsor and Maidenhead
- Specialist: Secondary School
- Department for Education URN: 138342 Tables
- Ofsted: Reports
- Co Chairs of Governors: Jan McLucas/Louise Griffin
- Headteacher: Cath Harden
- Staff: 100 (approx.)
- Gender: Boys and girls (mixed school)
- Age: 11 to 18
- Enrolment: 850 (approx.)
- Houses: Hope, Joy, Faith
- Website: www.altwoodschool.co.uk

Altwood Church of England School is the only Church of England secondary school in Maidenhead.

Altwood School is an academy. The school draws pupils from across Maidenhead, Berkshire and Buckinghamshire.

== History ==
Boyn Hill Church of England Senior Girls' School (1836–1907) and St Luke's Church of England Secondary Boys' School (1836–1907) both shared the present site of Altwood School. In 1907 the two schools merged to produce a co-educational school called Altwood Church of England Secondary School.

Altwood School became a comprehensive school in 1971 In 2007 it became a Business and Enterprise College specialist school. The school converted to academy status in August 2012.
