= Togetherland =

Unreleased studio album by Seal

Studio album by Seal
- Released: Unreleased
- Recorded: 1999–2001
- Genre: Pop; soul
- Label: Warner Bros.
- Producer: Henry Jackman; Seal

Seal chronology
Human Being (1998)	Togetherland (Unreleased)	Seal IV (2003)

Togetherland is an unreleased studio album recorded by British singer Seal, originally scheduled for release in 2001.

== Background and recording ==
The tracks were originally written and recorded at Seal's home studio in Los Angeles in 1999. Songwriters Guy Gershoni and Dave Palmer were brought in at two-week intervals for eight months of intensive collaboration efforts. The outcome of these writing sessions were experimental, edgy, underground club tracks reflective of Seal's early career and roots. Henry Jackman was contracted to produce and help create a mainstream sounding album, before it was presented to the label. Contrary to various reports, Warner Bros. Records turned down the album due to their dissatisfaction with the final record. Seal decided to record and release Seal IV in its place. He then put Togetherland into a "vault", where the album has remained since.

Over the years, fans have been able to listen to 30-second clips as well as streamed, full versions of some of the album's songs, to which many of those songs received praise. On 1 July 2007, a book titled The Greatest Music Never Sold was released and makes mention of Togetherland as well as other popular artists whose music has been kept hidden away.

The only song from Togetherland to be released commercially is "This Could Be Heaven" (originally entitled simply "Heaven"), which was featured on the soundtrack of the motion picture The Family Man. The recording of the track, however, is different from the version that was recorded for Togetherland. As well, the song "Whatever You Need", released as one of two bonus tracks on the deluxe edition of 7 (2015), is also a slightly different and retitled version of the Togetherland track "Breathe".

== Track listing ==
1. "(Just a) Step Away"
2. "Keep On" (originally titled "Champagne")
3. "Love Is Better"
4. "Elise"
5. "Under the Sun"
6. "Heaven"
7. "English Lover" (duet with Emiliana Torrini)
8. "Breathe"
9. "All I Wanted to Say"
10. "Let It Ride"
11. "Togetherland"
