= Halli Cauthery =

- Birth name: David Harald Cauthery
- Born: England, United Kingdom
- Genres: Film score
- Occupation: Composer

David Harald "Halli" Cauthery is an English film and television composer. His credits include the Hulu/Sony Pictures Television comedy series Future Man; the Netflix/DreamWorks animated comedy series Turbo F.A.S.T., for which he received an Emmy nomination in 2016; the critically acclaimed thriller The East; Bernard Rose's 2015 adaptation of Frankenstein; the Shrek Halloween television special Scared Shrekless; as well as the Lifetime Television film Living Proof.

He has worked extensively with composer Harry Gregson-Williams, contributing additional music to such films as Cowboys & Aliens, Unstoppable, Prince of Persia: The Sands of Time, Shrek Forever After, X-Men Origins: Wolverine, and The Chronicles of Narnia: Prince Caspian, as well as Wonder Woman, Bee Movie and Winters Tale alongside Hans Zimmer and Rupert Gregson-Williams. He has also worked with Henry Jackman (for Jumanji: Welcome to the Jungle, Kong: Skull Island, Captain America: Civil War, Pixels, Turbo and Ron's Gone Wrong), Danny Elfman (for Hellboy 2: The Golden Army) and Brian Tyler (for Iron Man 3).

As a violinist he can be heard as a featured soloist in the score to Shrek Forever After, as well as in several episodes of Turbo F.A.S.T..

Cauthery, who is British/Icelandic, attended the Yehudi Menuhin School, where he studied violin, viola and composition. He obtained a degree in music at Manchester University and an MPhil degree in musicology at St. Edwards College at the University of Cambridge. In the UK, he taught at the Yehudi Menuhin School, while also working as a violinist and composer. He played in, among others, the orchestra of English National Opera. He has had works performed at London's Wigmore Hall and Purcell Room.
