= 7 (Seal album) =

Studio album by Seal
- Released: 6 November 2015
- Studios: Sarm Studios and Angel Recording Studios (London, UK); The Village Recorder and Sarm West Coast (Los Angeles, California)
- Genres: Soul; R&B
- Label: Warner Bros.
- Producers: Trevor Horn; Seal; Jamie Odell

Seal chronology
Soul 2 (2011)	7 (2015)	Standards (2017)

Singles from Seal 7
- 1. "Every Time I'm with You" Released: 11 September 2015; 2. "Do You Ever" Released: 11 September 2015

Professional ratings
Review scores
Source	Rating
AllMusic	3.5/5 stars
The Guardian	2/5 stars
The Irish Times	3/5 stars
Pop Magazine	5/5 stars

7 is the ninth studio album by the British soul and R&B singer-songwriter Seal. The album was released on 6 November 2015 by Warner Bros. Records. Its title comes from being Seal's seventh album of original songs, his first since Seal 6: Commitment (2010).

The singles "Every Time I'm with You" and "Do You Ever" were released on 11 September 2015. Two promotional singles were released in advance of the album: "Life on the Dancefloor" on 2 October and "Padded Cell" on 16 October. The bonus track "Whatever You Need" is a reworked version of a Togetherland track called "Breathe", making it only the second officially released song from that unreleased album, following "This Could Be Heaven" from the Family Man soundtrack.

== Track listing ==
All tracks produced by Trevor Horn and Seal, except as noted.

Standard edition
No.	Title	Writer(s)	Producers	Length
1.	"Daylight Saving"	Seal; Stephan Moccio; Trevor Horn		4:50
2.	"Every Time I'm with You"	Seal; Simon Bloor; T. Horn		4:31
3.	"Life on the Dancefloor"	Seal; Jamie Odell	Seal; T. Horn; Odell (additional)	5:14
4.	"Padded Cell"	Seal; Bloor; Aaron Horn; T. Horn; Louis Cole		4:08
5.	"Do You Ever"	Seal; Justin Parker; T. Horn		4:36
6.	"The Big Love Has Died"	Seal; Bloor; T. Horn		4:30
7.	"Redzone Killer"	Seal; Bloor; A. Horn; T. Horn		4:22
8.	"Monascow"	Seal; Joel Compass; T. Horn		4:10
9.	"Half a Heart"	Seal; Echosmith; Jeffery David; Philip Bentley		3:54
10.	"Let Yourself"	Seal		4:26
11.	"Love"	Seal; David		4:35
Total length:				49:16

Target edition bonus tracks
No.	Title	Writer(s)	Length
12.	"We Found Love"	Seal; David	4:24
13.	"Whatever You Need"	Seal	4:34
Total length:			58:14

== Personnel ==
- Seal – vocals, programming (4, 7, 10, 13)
- Stephan Moccio – acoustic piano (1), keyboards (1), programming (1)
- Julian Hinton – keyboards (1), programming (6, 9), additional orchestration (6), orchestral arrangements (9)
- Aaron Horn – programming (1, 4, 7)
- Trevor Horn – keyboards, guitars (1, 4, 5), bass guitar (2, 3, 5, 7–9), backing vocals (9)
- Jamie Muhoberac – acoustic piano (1, 2, 4, 5, 7, 9, 11, 13), keyboards (1, 2, 4, 5, 7–11, 13), programming (1, 3–5, 7, 9–11, 13), organ (2, 4, 9), bass guitar (9, 10, 13), arrangements (11), drum programming (13)
- Jamie Odell – keyboards (3, 8), programming (3, 4, 7, 8)
- Dave McCracken – programming (4)
- Cameron Gower-Poole – programming (4, 5, 9, 10), percussion (7)
- Justin Parker – keyboards (5), programming (5)
- Tim Weidner – programming (5), sound effects (6)
- Jeffrey David – acoustic piano (12), keyboards (12), guitars (12), drum programming (12)
- Simon Bloor – guitars (1–9), keyboards (2, 7–10), programming (2, 3, 6, 10, 11, 13), acoustic piano (4, 6, 10, 13), additional orchestration (9)
- Chris Bruce – guitars (1, 4, 5, 7, 12), bass guitar (1, 2, 4, 6–8, 11–13)
- Phil Palmer – guitars (2, 4–6, 8, 9)
- Lol Creme – guitars (4, 7–9), percussion (9), backing vocals (9)
- Josh Campbell – guitars (7, 13)
- Josh Tyrrell – guitars (12)
- Paul Turner – bass guitar (4)
- Earl Harvin – drums (1, 2, 4), cymbals (4)
- Joel Peters – drums (1, 4, 5, 7), programming (4, 5, 9), percussion (7, 10)
- Ash Soan – drums (4, 5, 7, 9)
- Abe Rounds – drums (8)
- Luís Jardim – percussion (1, 2, 5–7, 9, 10)
- Dave Bishop – saxophones (3, 8)
- Andy Wood – trombone (3, 8)
- Steve Sidwell – trumpet (3, 8), brass arrangements (3, 8)
- Paul Spong – trumpet (3, 8)
- Anne Dudley – orchestral arrangements and conductor (1, 2, 4, 6), acoustic piano (5)
- Nick Ingman – orchestral arrangements and conductor (5, 7, 10)
- Isobel Griffiths – orchestral contractor and fixer (1, 2, 4–7, 10)
- Minnetonka – backing vocals (4)
- Mr Probz – backing vocals (4)

== Production ==
- Jeff Fenster – A&R direction
- Allen Wolfe – A&R administration
- John Chen – A&R coordinator
- Mark Taylor – A&R coordinator
- Gavin Taylor – art direction, design
- David Drebin – cover photography
- Hélène-Marie Pambrun – additional photography

Technical

- Nick Watson – mastering at Fluid Mastering (London, UK)
- Oli Morgan – mastering assistant
- Cameron Gower-Poole – recording (1–10, 12, 13), mixing (12, 13)
- Joel Peters – recording (1–10, 12), mixing (4, 7)
- Mat Bartam – string recording (1, 2, 4–7, 10)
- Tim Weidner – mixing (1–3, 5, 6, 8–11), recording (11)
- Simon Bloor – additional engineer, recording (11)
- Josh Campbell – assistant engineer (1–3, 5–10, 12, 13), additional engineer (4), recording (11)
- Chris Parker – string recording assistant (1, 2, 4–7, 10)
- Alex Williams – mix assistant (1–3, 5, 6, 8–11)
- Josh Tyrrell – mix assistant (4, 7)

== Charts ==
=== Weekly charts ===
Chart (2015)	Peak position
Australian Albums (ARIA)	64
Belgian Albums (Ultratop Flanders)	23
Belgian Albums (Ultratop Wallonia)	13
Canadian Albums (Billboard)	21
Dutch Albums (Album Top 100)	7
French Albums (SNEP)	18
Hungarian Albums (MAHASZ)	2
Irish Albums (IRMA)	69
Italian Albums (FIMI)	45
Portuguese Albums (AFP)	25
Spanish Albums (Promusicae)	40
Swiss Albums (Schweizer Hitparade)	9
UK Albums (Official Charts)	13
UK R&B Albums (Official Charts)	1
US Billboard 200	45

=== Year-end charts ===
Chart (2015)	Position
Belgian Albums (Ultratop Wallonia)	110
French Albums (SNEP)	80
Chart (2016)	Position
Belgian Albums (Ultratop Wallonia)	154

== Certifications ==
Region	Certification	Certified units/sales
France (SNEP)	Gold	50,000^{‡}
Hungary (MAHASZ)	Gold	1,000^{^}
^{^} Shipments figures based on certification alone.^{‡} Sales+streaming figures based on certification alone.
