= Henry Jackman =

English film and television music composer, music conductor and music arranger

- Born: Henry Pryce Jackman; 1 June 1974 (age 52); Hillingdon, London, UK
- Genres: Film and television scores, video game score, electronic, EDM, big beat, synth-pop, synthwave, pop rock, hard rock, contemporary classical, jazz
- Occupations: Composer, conductor, arranger
- Instruments: Piano, keyboards, synthesizer, guitar
- Years active: 1992–present
- Label: Remote Control Productions

Henry Pryce Jackman (born 1 June 1974) is a British film and television score composer, conductor and arranger. He composed music for films such as Kick-Ass and its sequel, X-Men: First Class, Captain Phillips, Captain America: The Winter Soldier, The Interview, Pixels, Captain America: Civil War, Kong: Skull Island, Jumanji: Welcome to the Jungle and its sequels, Pokémon: Detective Pikachu, Ron's Gone Wrong, Red One, Smurfs, five Walt Disney Animation Studios films, including Winnie the Pooh, Wreck-It Ralph, Big Hero 6 and Strange World and three DreamWorks Animation films, including Monsters vs. Aliens, Puss in Boots and Turbo. Outside of film, he has also scored television series including The Man in the High Castle, The Comey Rule and The Falcon and the Winter Soldier, and video games including Battlefield 6, Disney Infinity, Uncharted 4: A Thief's End, Uncharted: The Lost Legacy and Just Cause 3.

He is also known for collaborating with directors including the Russo brothers, Matthew Vaughn, Rich Moore, Don Hall, Chris Miller, Rob Letterman, Seth Rogen, Evan Goldberg, Edward Zwick, Jake Kasdan and Sam Hargrave; conductor Nick Glennie-Smith; scoring mixer Alan Meyerson and Chris Fogel; and violinists Bruce Dukov, Charlie Bisharat, and Eun-Mee Ahn.

== Life and career ==
Jackman was born in Hillingdon, London. He studied classical music at St. Paul's Cathedral Choir School, Eton College, Framlingham College and New College, Oxford, University of Oxford.

Jackman has done programming and production work with artists including Mike Oldfield (Voyager), Sally Oldfield (Flaming Star), Trevor Horn/Art of Noise (The Seduction of Claude Debussy), Elton John and Gary Barlow. He co-produced Seal's unreleased 2001 album Togetherland. "This Could Be Heaven", released from the album, was also co-written by Jackman and used on the movie The Family Man and included on the deluxe edition of Seal's compilation album Hits.

Jackman has released three albums, Utopia (2003), Transfiguration (2005), and Acoustica (2007; with Augustus Isadore).

Jackman had various minor roles on film scores since 2006, generally working with mentor Hans Zimmer, including for The Da Vinci Code (music programmer), The Dark Knight (music arranger) and additional music for Pirates of the Caribbean: Dead Man's Chest, Pirates of the Caribbean: At World's End, The Simpsons Movie, Kung Fu Panda and Hancock. In 2009, Jackman, Zimmer and John Powell won the 2008 Annie Award for Music in an Animated Television Production or Short Form for their work on DreamWorks Animation's Secrets of the Furious Five (a spin-off to Kung Fu Panda). Jackman has since composed soundtracks for films such as Monsters vs. Aliens, Henri 4, Gulliver's Travels, X-Men: First Class, Winnie the Pooh, Abraham Lincoln: Vampire Hunter, Wreck-It Ralph, Captain America: The Winter Soldier, Captain America: Civil War and Ron's Gone Wrong. His most successful video game scores were Uncharted 4: A Thief's End, Uncharted: The Lost Legacy and Just Cause 3.

In March 2022, Reservoir Media acquired the rights to Jackman's catalog.

== Family ==
Henry Jackman is the son of keyboardist and arranger Andrew Pryce Jackman, who was a member of The Syn and worked for many years with Chris Squire of Yes. His uncle Gregg Jackman is a sound engineer and producer who has worked with the King's Singers and Barclay James Harvest; Henry and his uncle both worked on Moa's 1999 album Universal. His grandfather, Bill Jackman, played clarinet on "When I'm Sixty-Four" on The Beatles' Sgt. Pepper's Lonely Hearts Club Band.

== Discography ==
=== Albums ===
- Voyager (1996): additional music programming
- Earthbound (1997): drum programming
- The Seduction of Claude Debussy (1999): album co-producing
- Universal (1999): album producing
- Weather (1999): rhythm programming and sound designing
- Togetherland (2001): album producing
- Utopia (2003): album producing
- Transfiguration (2005): album producing
- Acoustica (2007): album producing

=== Songs ===
- "Flaming Star" (1992): remixing and remastering
- "At the Beginning" (1997): keyboarding, programming and string arranging
- "Women of Ireland" (1997): additional music programming
- "Weather (Henry Jackman Remix)" (1998): co-writing, co-producing and remixing
- "Written in the Stars" (1999): programming
- "I Believe" (1999): programming and mixing
- "This Could Be Heaven" (2001): co-writing, co-producing and programming
- "Time to Fly" (2001): co-writing, co-producing and co-mixing
- "A Grave Situation" (2015): co-writing and co-producing
- "Fate Is Fluid" (2015): co-writing and co-producing
- "The Crown Prince's Speech" (2015): co-writing and co-producing
- "Too Good For This World" (2015): co-writing and co-producing
- "Louisiana Hero" (2021): writing and producing
- "New Friends" (2021): co-writing and co-producing
- "The Comedown" (2021): writing and producing
- "The Future of Friendship / New Friends" (2021): co-writing and co-producing

== Filmography ==
=== Feature films ===
==== 2000s ====
Year	Title	Director(s)	Company credits	Note(s)
2009	Monsters vs. Aliens	Rob Letterman; Conrad Vernon	Paramount Pictures; DreamWorks Animation	Replaced Mark Mothersbaugh; Henry Jackman's first score for an animated film. Additional Music by Marc Bonilla

==== 2010s ====
Year	Title	Director(s)	Company credits	Note(s)
2010	Kick-Ass	Matthew Vaughn	Lionsgate; Marv Films; Plan B Entertainment	Co-composed with John Murphy, Marius de Vries and Ilan Eshkeri
2010	Gulliver's Travels	Rob Letterman	20th Century Fox; Dune Entertainment; Davis Entertainment; Big Screen Productions; Ingenious Film Partners; Phoenix Film Partners	Additional Music by Christopher Willis and Dominic Lewis
2011	Winnie the Pooh	Stephen Anderson; Don Hall	Walt Disney Pictures; Walt Disney Animation Studios; Walt Disney Studios Motion Pictures	Walt Disney Animation Studios theme music composed by Wilfred Jackson; Additional Music by Christopher Willis; Original songs by Kristen Anderson-Lopez & Robert Lopez
2011	X-Men: First Class	Matthew Vaughn	20th Century Fox; Marvel Entertainment; The Donners' Company; Bad Hat Harry Productions; Dune Entertainment; Ingenious Film Partners	Additional Music by Christopher Willis, Matthew Margeson & Dominic Lewis
2011	Puss in Boots	Chris Miller	Paramount Pictures; DreamWorks Animation	Additional Music by Matthew Margeson & Dominic Lewis
2012	Abraham Lincoln: Vampire Hunter	Timur Bekmambetov	20th Century Fox; Bazelevs Company; Dune Entertainment; Tim Burton Productions	Additional Music by Matthew Margeson
2012	Man on a Ledge	Asger Leth	Summit Entertainment; Lionsgate; Di Bonaventura Pictures	Additional Music by Matthew Margeson
2012	Wreck-It Ralph	Rich Moore	Walt Disney Pictures; Walt Disney Animation Studios; Walt Disney Studios Motion Pictures	Walt Disney Animation Studios theme music composed by Wilfred Jackson; Replaced Thomas Newman; Additional Music by Matthew Margeson & Dominic Lewis
2013	Captain Phillips	Paul Greengrass	Sony Pictures Releasing; Columbia Pictures; Scott Rudin Productions; Michael De Luca Productions; Trigger Street Productions	Additional Music by Al Clay, Lorne Balfe & Jack Dolman
2013	G.I. Joe: Retaliation	Jon M. Chu	Paramount Pictures; Metro-Goldwyn-Mayer Pictures; Skydance Productions; Hasbro; Di Bonaventura Pictures	Additional Music By Stephen Hilton, Tom Holkenborg, Andrew Kaczynski, Matthew Margeson & Dominic Lewis
2013	Kick-Ass 2	Jeff Wadlow	Universal Pictures; Marv Films; Plan B Entertainment	Co-composed with Matthew Margeson; Additional Music by Alex Belcher & Jason Soudah
2013	This Is the End	Seth Rogen; Evan Goldberg	Sony Pictures Releasing; Columbia Pictures; Mandate Pictures; Point Grey Pictures	Additional Music by Marc Bonilla, Matthew Margeson & Dominic Lewis
2013	Turbo	David Soren	20th Century Fox; DreamWorks Animation	Additional Music by Halli Cauthery & Paul Mounsey
2014	Big Hero 6	Don Hall	Walt Disney Pictures; Walt Disney Animation Studios; Walt Disney Studios Motion Pictures	Walt Disney Animation Studios theme music composed by Wilfred Jackson; Additional Music by Dominic Lewis & Paul Mounsey
2014	Captain America: The Winter Soldier	Anthony Russo; Joe Russo	Marvel Studios; Walt Disney Studios Motion Pictures	Replaced Alan Silvestri; Additional Music by Matthew Margeson & Dominic Lewis
2014	Kingsman: The Secret Service	Matthew Vaughn	20th Century Fox; Marv Films; Cloudy Productions	Additional Music by Jason Soudah & Dominic Lewis
2014	The Interview	Seth Rogen; Evan Goldberg	Sony Pictures Releasing; Columbia Pictures; LStar Capital; Point Grey Pictures	Additional Music by Dominic Lewis & Sujin Nam
2015	Pixels	Chris Columbus	Sony Pictures Releasing; Columbia Pictures; Happy Madison Productions; 1492 Pictures; LStar Capital; China Film Co., Ltd. Film Croppers Entertainment	Replaced Rupert Gregson-Williams; Additional Music by Halli Cauthery
2016	Captain America: Civil War	Anthony Russo; Joe Russo	Marvel Studios; Walt Disney Studios Motion Pictures	Additional Music by Alex Belcher & Halli Cauthery
2016	Jack Reacher: Never Go Back	Edward Zwick	Paramount Pictures; Skydance; TC Productions	Additional Music by Alex Belcher, Stephen Hilton & Paul Mounsey
2016	The 5th Wave	J Blakeson	Sony Pictures Releasing; Columbia Pictures; LStar Capital; GK Films; Material Pictures; Living Films	Additional Music by Alex Belcher & Andrew Kaczynski
2016	The Birth of a Nation	Nate Parker	Fox Searchlight Pictures; BRON Studios; Phantom Four; Mandalay Pictures; Tiny Giant Entertainment; Novofam Productions; Follow Through Productions; Infinity Entertainment; Oster Media; Point Made Films; Juniper Productions; Hit 55 Ventures; Creative Wealth Media Finance Corp.	Additional Music by Anthony Willis
2017	Jumanji: Welcome to the Jungle	Jake Kasdan	Sony Pictures Releasing; Columbia Pictures; Matt Tolmach Productions; Seven Bucks Productions	Replaced James Newton Howard; Additional Music by Tammy Ari, Halli Cauthery, Collin G. Scudder & Paul Mounsey
2017	Kingsman: The Golden Circle	Matthew Vaughn	20th Century Fox; Marv Films; Cloudy Productions	Co-composed with Matthew Margeson; Additional Music by Alex Belcher & Stephen Hilton
2017	Kong: Skull Island	Jordan Vogt-Roberts	Warner Bros. Pictures; Legendary Pictures; Tencent Pictures	Additional Music by Alex Belcher & Halli Cauthery
2018	Ralph Breaks the Internet	Rich Moore; Phil Johnston	Walt Disney Pictures; Walt Disney Animation Studios; Walt Disney Studios Motion Pictures	Walt Disney Animation Studios theme music composed by Wilfred Jackson; Additional Music by Jeff Morrow, Anthony Willis & Alan Menken
2018	The Predator	Shane Black	20th Century Fox; Davis Entertainment	Additional Music by Alex Belcher, Halli Cauthery & Matthew Margeson
2018	Trial by Fire	Edward Zwick	Roadside Attractions; The Bedford Falls Company; Flashlight Films	Additional Music by Alex Belcher
2019	21 Bridges	Brian Kirk	STXfilms; MWM Studios; H. Brothers; AGBO; X-Ception Content	Co-composed with Alex Belcher; Additional Music by Maverick Dugger
2019	American Skin	Nate Parker	Vertical Entertainment; TM Films; Tiny Giant Entertainment	Additional Music by Maverick Dugger
2019	Io	Jonathan Helpert	Netflix; Mandalay Pictures; Sunset Junction Entertainment; Untitled Entertainment; Great Point Media	
2019	Jumanji: The Next Level	Jake Kasdan	Sony Pictures Releasing; Columbia Pictures; Matt Tolmach Productions; Seven Bucks Productions; The Detective Agency	Additional Music by Jeff Morrow, Anthony Willis and Paul Mounsey
2019	Mosul	Matthew Michael Carnahan	Netflix; AGBO; Image Nation; Condé Nast Entertainment	
2019	Pokémon: Detective Pikachu	Rob Letterman	Warner Bros. Pictures; Legendary Pictures; The Pokémon Company; Toho Co., Ltd	Additional Music by Jeff Morrow, Kazuma Jinnouchi, Evan Goldman, and Maverick Dugger

==== 2020 ====
Year	Title	Director(s)	Company credits	Note(s)
2020	Extraction	Sam Hargrave	Netflix; AGBO; Thematic Entertainment; India Take One Productions; T.G.I.M. Films	Co-composed with Alex Belcher; Additional Music by Maverick Dugger
2021	Cherry	Anthony Russo; Joe Russo	Apple TV+ Apple Original Films; The Hideaway Entertainment; AGBO; Endeavor Content	Additional Music by Alex Belcher & Jack Dolman
2021	Ron's Gone Wrong	Sarah Smith; Jean-Philippe Vine	20th Century Studios; 20th Century Animation; Locksmith Animation	Additional Music by Halli Cauthery, Alex Kovacs & Anthony Willis
2022	The Gray Man	Anthony Russo; Joe Russo	Netflix	Additional Music by Alex Belcher & Jack Dolman
2022	Strange World	Don Hall	Walt Disney Pictures; Walt Disney Animation Studios; Walt Disney Studios Motion Pictures	Walt Disney Animation Studios theme music composed by Wilfred Jackson; Additional Music by Jeff Morrow, Halli Cauthery, Sven Faulconer, Antonio Di Iorio, Maverick Dugger, Evan Goldman and Alex Kovacs
2023	Extraction 2	Sam Hargrave	Netflix; Wild State; AGBO; T.G.I.M. Films	Co-composed with Alex Belcher; Additional Music by Evan Goldman, Tom Hodge & Jon Monroe
2024	Red One	Jake Kasdan	Amazon MGM Studios; Metro-Goldwyn-Mayer; Seven Bucks Productions; Chris Morgan Productions; The Detective Agency; Big Indie Pictures	Additional Music by Antonio Di Iorio, Evan Goldman, Maverick Dugger, Alex Kovacs & Anthony Willis
2025	Smurfs	Chris Miller	Paramount Pictures; Paramount Animation	Additional Music by Halli Cauthery, Evan Goldman, Antonio Di Iorio & Alex Kovacs; Original songs by Rihanna
2026	The Bluff	Frank E. Flowers	Amazon MGM Studios; AGBO; Cinestar Pictures; Big Indie Pictures; Purple Pebble Pictures	Additional Music by Alex Kovacs
2026	Behemoth!	Tony Gilroy	Searchlight Pictures	Co-composed with James Newton Howard, Alan Silvestri, Brandon Roberts, Michael Giacchino, Nami Melumad, Michael Abels, Emily Bear, and Lukas Frank
2026	Jumanji: Open World	Jake Kasdan	Sony Pictures Releasing; Columbia Pictures; Matt Tolmach Productions; Seven Bucks Productions; The Detective Agency	
2027	Godzilla x Kong: Supernova	Grant Sputore	Warner Bros. Pictures; Legendary Pictures; Toho Co. Ltd.	Additional Music by Evan Goldman, Alex Kovacs & Maverick Dugger

==== Additional music ====
Year	Title	Director(s)	Composer(s)	Notes
2006	Pirates of the Caribbean: Dead Man's Chest	Gore Verbinski	Hans Zimmer	
2006	The Holiday	Nancy Meyers	Hans Zimmer	
2007	Pirates of the Caribbean: At World's End	Gore Verbinski	Hans Zimmer	
2007	The Simpsons Movie	David Silverman	Hans Zimmer	
2008	Vantage Point	Pete Travis	Atli Örvarsson	
2008	Kung Fu Panda	John Stevenson; Mark Osborne	Hans Zimmer; John Powell	
2008	Hancock	Peter Berg	John Powell	
2009	It's Complicated	Nancy Meyers	Hans Zimmer; Heitor Pereira	

==== Short films ====
Year	Title	Director	Studio	Notes
2008	Secrets of the Furious Five	Raman Hui	DreamWorks Animation	Composed with Hans Zimmer and John Powell
2009	B.O.B.'s Big Break	Mike Mitchell	DreamWorks Animation	
2009	Monsters vs. Aliens: Mutant Pumpkins from Outer Space	Peter Ramsey	DreamWorks Animation	
2010	Kung Fu Panda Holiday	Tim Johnson	DreamWorks Animation	
2011	Toy Story Toons: Small Fry	Angus MacLane	Pixar Animation Studios	
2012	Puss in Boots: The Three Diablos	Raman Hui	DreamWorks Animation	Composed with Matthew Margeson

=== Television ===
==== TV series ====
Year	Title	Notes
2013–2016	Turbo FAST	With Halli Cauthery
2015	The Man in the High Castle	With Dominic Lewis
2020	The Comey Rule	Miniseries
2021	The Falcon and the Winter Soldier	Miniseries

=== Video games ===
Year	Title	Studio / Publisher	Notes
2007	Colin McRae: Dirt	Codemasters	"Stasis" only.
2013	Disney Infinity	Disney Interactive Studios	Themes only Score composed by Chuck E. Myers
2013	Lego Marvel Super Heroes	Warner Bros. Interactive Entertainment	Themes only Score composed by Rob Westwood
2014	Disney Infinity 2.0	Disney Interactive Studios	Themes only Score composed by Chuck E. Myers, Kevin Manthei and James Dooley
2015	Disney Infinity 3.0	Disney Interactive Studios	Themes only Score composed by Chuck E. Myers, Kevin Manthei and James Dooley
2015	Just Cause 3	Square Enix Europe	Also score producer
2015	Lego Dimensions	Warner Bros. Interactive Entertainment	Themes only Score composed by Rob Westwood and Ian Livingstone
2016	Uncharted 4: A Thief's End	Sony Computer Entertainment	Also score producer
2022	Disney Dreamlight Valley	Gameloft	Themes only
2025	Tom Clancy's Rainbow Six Siege X	Ubisoft	
2025	Battlefield 6	Electronic Arts	Also performer

== Awards and nominations ==
Year	Award	Nominated work	Result
2009	Annie Award for Best Music in an Animated Television Production or Short Form	Secrets of the Furious Five	Won
2009	International Film Music Critics Award for Breakout Composer of the Year		Nominated
2010	ASCAP Film and Television Music Award for Top Box Office Films	Monsters vs. Aliens	Won
2011	Annie Award for Best Music in a Television Production	Kung Fu Panda Holiday	Nominated
2011	World Soundtrack Award for Discovery of the Year	X-Men: First Class & Gulliver's Travels	Nominated
2011	International Film Music Critics Award for Best Original Score for an Animated Feature Film	Puss in Boots	Nominated
2012	Annie Award for Music in a Feature Production	Puss in Boots	Nominated
2012	Annie Award for Music in a Feature Production	Winnie the Pooh	Nominated
2012	ASCAP Film and Television Music Award for Top Box Office Films	Puss in Boots	Won
2012	ASCAP Film and Television Music Award for Top Box Office Films	X-Men: First Class	Won
2013	Annie Award for Music in an Animated Feature Production	Wreck-It Ralph	Won
2013	ASCAP Film and Television Music Award for Top Box Office Films	Wreck-It Ralph	Won
2013	International Film Music Critics Award for Best Original Score for a Comedy Film	This Is the End	Nominated
2014	Annie Award for Outstanding Achievement in Music in an Animated Feature Production	Turbo	Nominated
2014	BAFTA Award for Best Film Music	Captain Phillips	Nominated
2017	BAFTA Games Award for Best Music	Uncharted 4: A Thief's End	Nominated
2017	National Academy of Video Game Trade Reviewers	Uncharted 4: A Thief's End	Won

== See also ==
- Music of the Marvel Cinematic Universe
