= Seal discography =

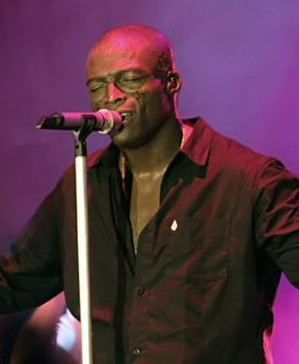
- Seal performing in Frankfurt, Germany (2006)
- Studio albums: 10
- Live albums: 4
- Compilation albums: 2
- Singles: 43
- Video albums: 4
- Music videos: 28

English singer and songwriter Seal has released ten studio albums, four live albums, two compilation albums, forty-three singles and four video albums.

From 1994 to 2016, Seal has had 13 singles that charted on the US Adult Contemporary chart, two of which peaked at number one.

== Albums ==
=== Studio albums ===
List of albums, with selected chart positions, and certifications
Title	Details	Peak chart positions										Certifications
Title	Details	UK	AUS	AUT	FRA	GER	NLD	NZ	SWE	SWI	US	Certifications
Seal	Released: 20 May 1991; Label: ZTT; Formats: LP, CD, cassette	1	22	2	20	7	4	6	5	2	27	BPI: 2× Platinum; ARIA: Gold; BVMI: Gold; IFPI AUT: Gold; IFPI SWI: Platinum; NVPI: Gold; RIAA: Platinum; SNEP: 2× Gold
Seal	Released: 23 May 1994; Label: ZTT; Formats: LP, CD, cassette	1	2	8	28	25	3	4	33	15	15	BPI: 2× Platinum; ARIA: Platinum; BVMI: Gold; NVPI: Gold; RIAA: 5× Platinum; RMNZ: Platinum
Human Being	Released: 16 November 1998; Label: Warner Bros.; Formats: LP, CD, cassette	44	82	21	—	24	25	14	—	18	22	BPI: Silver; RIAA: Gold; RMNZ: Gold
Seal IV	Released: 9 September 2003; Label: Warner Bros.; Formats: LP, CD, digital download	4	65	7	5	2	7	21	2	1	3	BPI: Gold; BVMI: 2× Platinum; IFPI AUT: Platinum; IFPI SWI: Platinum; RIAA: Gold; SNEP: Platinum
System	Released: 12 November 2007; Label: Warner Bros.; Formats: LP, CD, digital download	37	—	5	33	13	42	—	37	3	35	BVMI: Gold; IFPI SWI: Gold; SNEP: Gold
Soul	Released: 10 November 2008; Label: Warner Bros.; Formats: CD, digital download	12	16	8	1	15	6	22	6	4	13	BPI: Platinum; ARIA: Gold; BVMI: Gold; IFPI AUT: Gold; IFPI SWE: Gold; IFPI SWI: Platinum; SNEP: Diamond
Seal 6: Commitment	Released: 20 September 2010; Label: Reprise; Formats: CD, digital download	11	47	48	5	46	19	—	29	8	31	BPI: Silver; SNEP: Platinum
Soul 2	Released: 4 November 2011; Label: Reprise; Formats: CD, digital download	17	42	—	6	—	25	—	—	38	8	BPI: Gold; SNEP: Platinum
7	Released: 6 November 2015; Label: Warner Bros.; Formats: CD, LP, digital download	13	64	—	18	—	7	—	—	9	45	SNEP: Gold
Standards	Released: 10 November 2017; Label: Decca; Formats: CD, LP, digital download	17	31	36	18	70	88	—	—	32	— (Note: "Standards" did not enter the Billboard 200 chart, but peaked at number 97 on the Album Sales chart.)	
"—" denotes a recording that did not chart or was not released in that territory.

Notes

- There are two different versions of the 1991 debut album; for details see album's article.
- The subsequent 1994 album bears the same title as the debut, not to be confused with the debut's two versions; to avoid confusion, it is sometimes referred to as Seal II.

=== Live albums ===
Title	Details	Peak chart positions					Certifications
Title	Details	AUT	FRA	GER	NLD	SWI	Certifications
Live in Paris	Released: 6 July 2005; Label: Warner Bros.; Formats: CD, digital download	36	44	—	—	35	IFPI SWI: Platinum
One Night to Remember	Released: 27 March 2006; Label: Warner Bros.; Formats: CD, digital download	—	—	88	—	—	
Soul: Live	Released: 19 June 2009; Label: Warner Bros.; Formats: CD, digital download	—	42	—	82	—	
Live in Brooklyn	Released: 26 June 2009; Label: Immortal; Formats: CD, digital download	—	—	—	—	—	
"—" denotes a recording that did not chart or was not released in that territory.

=== Compilation albums ===
Title	Details	Peak chart positions										Certifications
Title	Details	UK	AUS	AUT	FRA	GER	NLD	NZ	SWE	SWI	US	Certifications
Best 1991–2004	Released: 8 November 2004; Label: Warner Bros.; Formats: CD, digital download, DVD-A	27	21	4	2	3	21	7	10	3	47	BPI: Gold; ARIA: Gold; BVMI: 2× Platinum; IFPI AUT: Gold; IFPI SWI: Platinum; RMNZ: Gold; SNEP: Platinum
Hits	Released: 30 November 2009; Label: Warner Bros.; Formats: CD, digital download	37	4	—	116	—	20	4	32	25	—	BPI: Gold; ARIA: Gold; RMNZ: Gold; SNEP: Platinum
"—" denotes a recording that did not chart or was not released in that territory.

=== Box sets ===
Title	Details	Peak chart positions		Certifications
Title	Details	AUS	NZ	Certifications
Seal and Seal II	Released: 10 September 1995; Label: Warner Bros.; Formats: CD, cassette	10	8	RMNZ: Gold
The Platinum Collection	Released: 11 October 2010; Label: Warner Bros.; Formats: CD, digital download	—	—	
"—" denotes a recording that did not chart or was not released in that territory.

== Singles ==
=== As lead artist ===
List of singles, with selected chart positions and certifications, showing year released and album name
Title	Year	Peak chart positions										Certifications	Album
Title	Year	UK	AUS	AUT	FRA	GER	NLD	NZ	SWE	SWI	US	Certifications	Album
"Crazy"	1990	2	9	5	5	2	1	8	1	1	7	BPI: Silver; RMNZ: Gold	Seal (1991)
"Future Love Paradise"	1991	12	46	15	18	16	10	25	13	7	—		Seal (1991)
"The Beginning"	1991	24	82	—	—	39	16	—	40	—	—		Seal (1991)
"Killer"	1991	8	95	—	—	—	75	37	—	—	100		Seal (1991)
"Violet"	1992	39	—	—	—	—	—	—	—	—	—		Seal (1991)
"Love Is Powerful"	1993	—	—	—	—	—	—	—	—	—	—		Non-album single
"Prayer for the Dying"	1994	14	56	—	—	62	40	13	—	49	21		Seal (1994)
"Kiss from a Rose"	1994	4	1	3	8	11	3	16	8	7	1	BPI: 2× Platinum; ARIA: Platinum; RIAA: Gold; RMNZ: 3× Platinum; SNEP: Gold	Seal (1994)
"Newborn Friend"	1994	45	—	—	—	—	—	24	—	—	— (Note: "Newborn Friend" did not enter the Billboard Hot 100, but peaked at number five on the Bubbling Under Hot 100 Singles chart, which acts as a 25-song extension to the Hot 100.)		Seal (1994)
"I'm Alive"	1995	—	—	—	—	—	—	—	—	—	—		Seal (1994)
"Don't Cry"	1995	51	—	—	—	—	—	—	—	—	33		Seal (1994)
"Fly Like an Eagle"	1997	13	81	—	—	61	—	29	—	38	10		Space Jam: Music from and Inspired by the Motion Picture
"Human Beings"	1998	50	—	—	—	96	—	29	—	—	—		Human Being
"Lost My Faith"	1999	—	—	—	—	—	—	—	—	—	—		Human Being
"This Could Be Heaven"	2001	—	—	—	—	—	88	39	—	—	—		The Family Man: Music from the Motion Picture
"Get It Together"	2003	25	72	38	—	41	78	34	23	22	—		Seal IV
"Love's Divine"	2003	68	—	11	4	4	68	34	43	4	79	BVMI: Gold; SNEP: Gold	Seal IV
"Waiting for You"	2003	80	—	—	—	—	—	—	—	—	89		Seal IV
"Walk On By"	2004	—	94	57	—	49	—	—	—	46	—		Best 1991–2004
"Killer 2005"	2005	—	—	—	—	—	—	—	—	—	—		Best 1991–2004
"A Father's Way"	2006	—	—	—	—	—	—	—	—	—	—		The Pursuit of Happyness soundtrack
"Amazing"	2007	74	60	6	—	9	60	—	54	4	—	BVMI: Gold	System
"The Right Life"	2008	—	—	—	—	46	—	—	—	—	—		System
"A Change Is Gonna Come"	2008	152	—	—	—	—	38	—	—	73	—		Soul
"It's a Man's Man's Man's World"	2008	—	—	—	—	—	—	—	—	57	—		Soul
"It's Alright"	2008	—	—	—	—	—	—	—	44	—	—		Soul
"Stand by Me"	2008	—	—	—	—	—	—	—	—	86	—		Soul
"I Can't Stand the Rain"	2009	—	—	—	—	67	—	—	—	—	—		Soul
"If You Don't Know Me by Now"	2009	—	—	—	—	—	—	—	—	—	—		Soul
"I Am Your Man"	2009	—	—	—	—	—	—	—	—	—	—		Hits
"Secret"	2010	82	—	—	—	88	—	—	58	—	—		Commitment
"Weight of My Mistakes"	2010	—	—	—	—	—	—	—	—	—	—		Commitment
"Let's Stay Together"	2011	—	—	—	74	—	—	—	—	—	—		Soul 2
"Wishing on a Star"	2011	168	—	—	—	—	—	—	—	—	—		Soul 2
"Every Time I'm with You" / "Do You Ever"	2015	—	—	—	—	—	—	—	—	—	—		7
"Life on the Dancefloor"	2015	—	—	—	—	—	—	—	—	—	—		7
"Padded Cell"	2015	—	—	—	—	—	—	—	—	—	—		7
"This Christmas"	2015	—	—	—	—	—	—	—	—	—	—		Non-album single
"Luck Be a Lady"	2017	—	—	—	—	—	—	—	—	—	—		Standards
"Santa Claus Is Coming to Town" (with Frank Sinatra)	2017	—	—	—	—	—	—	—	—	—	—		Non-album single
"—" denotes a recording that did not chart or was not released in that territory.

=== As featured artist ===
List of singles, with selected chart positions and certifications, showing year released and album name
Title	Year	Peak chart positions									Certifications	Album
Title	Year	UK	AUS	AUT	FRA	GER	NLD	NZ	SWE	SWI	Certifications	Album
"Manic Depression" (Jeff Beck featuring Seal)	1993	—	—	—	—	—	—	—	—	—		Stone Free: A Tribute to Jimi Hendrix
"How Do You Stop" (Joni Mitchell featuring Seal)	1994	100	—	—	—	—	—	—	—	—		Turbulent Indigo
"Les Mots" (Mylène Farmer and Seal)	2001	—	—	—	2	—	—	—	—	—	SNEP: Gold	Les Mots
"You Are My Kind" (Santana featuring Seal)	2002	—	—	—	—	—	—	—	—	—		Shaman
"My Vision" (Jakatta featuring Seal)	2002	6	43	—	—	—	—	—	—	—	BPI: Silver	Visions
"—" denotes a recording that did not chart or was not released in that territory.

== Other appearances ==
Year	Song	Album
1993	"Manic Depression" (Jeff Beck featuring Seal)	Stone Free: A Tribute to Jimi Hendrix
1993	"Out of the Window"	Indecent Proposal
1994	"How Do You Stop" (Joni Mitchell featuring Seal)	Turbulent Indigo
1994	"Crazy" (live version)	Grammy's Greatest Moments Volume IV
1995	"Bird of Freedom"	Clockers
2001	"Les Mots" (Mylène Farmer and Seal)	Les mots
2001	"History" (Outlawz and Seal)	Novakane
2002	"My Vision" (Jakatta featuring Seal)	Visions
2002	"You Are My Kind" (Carlos Santana featuring Seal)	Shaman
2008	"I Wish" (DMX and Seal)	Non-album single
2010	"You Get Me" (Mina with Seal)	Caramella
2011	"When a Man Loves a Woman" (Michael Bolton featuring Seal)	Gems
2011	"Lay It on the Line" (Recorded 1989) (Push featuring Seal)	Retrospective 1987–2004
2012	"Like a Rolling Stone" (Jeff Beck and Seal)	Chimes of Freedom – The Songs of Bob Dylan
2013	"We Loved It" (John Legend and Seal)	Love in the Future
2013	"Kiss from a Rose" (Straight No Chaser featuring Seal)	Under the Influence
2014	"Do They Know It's Christmas?" (Band Aid 30)	Do They Know It's Christmas?
2016	"Weight in Gold" (Spotify single) (Gallant featuring Seal)	In the Room
2016	"Mad World"	The Passion: New Orleans
2016	"We Don't Need Another Hero" (Jencarlos and Seal)	The Passion: New Orleans
2016	"Ashley Wednesday" (The Lonely Island and Seal)	Popstar: Never Stop Never Stopping
2017	"Cry to Me"	Dirty Dancing: Original Television Soundtrack
2019	"Ashes to Ashes" (Trevor Horn featuring the Sarm Orchestra and Seal)	Reimagines the Eighties
2021	"Ain't No Better Love"	The Harder They Fall (The Motion Picture Soundtrack)

== Videography ==
=== Video albums ===
Title	Detail
Live at the Point	Concert from 1991; Released: 9 October 1992; Formats: VHS, DVD (2003)
Videos 1991–2004	Music videos; Released: 29 November 2004; Formats: DVD
Live in Paris	Concert; Released: 4 April 2005; Formats: CD, DVD
One Night to Remember	Concert; Released: 27 March 2006; Formats: CD, DVD

=== Music videos ===
Year	Title	Director(s)
1990	"Crazy"	Andy Delaney, Monty Whitebloom
1991	"Future Love Paradise"	Michael Geoghegan
1991	"The Beginning"	Michael Geoghegan
1991	"Killer"	Don Searll
1994	"Prayer for the Dying"	Paul Boyd
1994	"Kiss from a Rose" (original version)	Matthew Rolston
1994	"Newborn Friend"	Lol Creme
1995	"Kiss from a Rose" (Batman Forever version)	Joel Schumacher
1995	"Don't Cry"	Wayne Isham
1996	"Fly Like an Eagle"	Joe Pytka
1998	"Human Beings"	Francis Lawrence
1999	"Lost My Faith"	Liz Friedlander
2000	"This Could Be Heaven"	Brett Ratner
2003	"Get It Together"	Noble Jones
2003	"Love's Divine"	Sanji Senaka
2004	"Waiting for You"	Len Chválová
2004	"Walk on By"	Meiert Avis
2007	"Amazing"	Paul R. Brown
2008	"The Right Life"	Karen Lamond
2008	"A Change Is Gonna Come"	Nabil Elderkin
2008	"People Get Ready"	
2008	"I Can't Stand the Rain"	
2008	"I've Been Loving You Too Long"	
2008	"It's a Man's Man's Man's World"	
2010	"Secret"	Nabil Elderkin
2010	"Weight of My Mistakes"	
2015	"Every Time I'm with You"	Brett Sullivan
2015	"Do You Ever"	Brett Sullivan
