= Hits (Seal album) =

Greatest hits album by Seal
- Released: 30 November 2009
- Recorded: 1991–2009
- Genres: R&B; rock
- Length: 79:10
- Label: Warner

Seal chronology
Soul (2008)	Hits (2009)	Commitment (2010)

Professional ratings
Review scores
Source	Rating
AllMusic	4/5 stars

Hits is a 2009 compilation album by Seal, released by Warner Bros. Records. It is Seal's second compilation album following 2004's Best 1991–2004. The album was released on two formats, a one-disc standard edition featuring 19 tracks and a two-disc deluxe edition with 34 tracks. Both versions of the album included two new songs, "I Am Your Man", composed by Ashford & Simpson and previously recorded by Edwin Starr, Bobby Taylor & the Vancouvers and the Four Tops, and "Thank You Fa Lettin' Me Be Myself" by Sly & the Family Stone.

The single-disc edition includes many of the single versions of the songs, whereas the deluxe edition replaces them with the album versions, or as in the case of "The Beginning", a remix. The cover also served as the artwork for the 2008 single "It's a Man's Man's Man's World".

== Track listing ==
Standard edition
No.	Title	Writer(s)	Originally from	Length
1.	"I Am Your Man"	Nickolas Ashford, Valerie Simpson	Hits (2009)	4:03
2.	"Kiss from a Rose"	Seal	Seal (1994) and Batman Forever soundtrack (1995)	4:47
3.	"Killer" (radio remix)	Seal, Adam Paul Tinley	Seal (1991)	4:17
4.	"Crazy"	Seal	Seal (1991)	4:29
5.	"Fly Like an Eagle"	Steve Miller	Space Jam soundtrack (1996)	4:14
6.	"Love's Divine"	Seal, Mark Batson	Seal IV (2003)	4:34
7.	"A Change Is Gonna Come"	Sam Cooke	Soul (2008)	3:54
8.	"Amazing"	Seal	System (2007)	3:02
9.	"Get It Together"	Seal, Mark Batson	Seal IV (2003)	4:26
10.	"Future Love Paradise"	Seal	Seal (1991)	4:19
11.	"My Vision" (featuring Jakatta)	Seal, Dave Lee, Rick Salmon, Thomas Newman	Seal IV (2003)	3:43
12.	"The Right Life" (single version)	Seal, Stuart Price	System (2007)	5:16
13.	"Prayer for the Dying" (single edit)	Seal, Augustus Isidore	Seal (1994)	4:14
14.	"I Can't Stand the Rain"	Ann Peebles, Don Bryant, Bernard Miller	Soul (2008)	3:34
15.	"Waiting for You"	Seal, Mark Batson	Seal IV (2003)	3:44
16.	"The Beginning" (single edit)	Seal, Guy Sigsworth	Seal (1991)	4:08
17.	"Don't Cry" (single version)	Seal	Seal (1994)	4:29
18.	"It's a Man's Man's Man's World"	James Brown, Betty Jean Newsome	Soul (2008)	3:52
19.	"Thank You"	Sly Stone	Hits (2009)	3:42

Deluxe edition disc 1
No.	Title	Length
1.	"I Am Your Man"	4:03
2.	"Kiss from a Rose"	4:47
3.	"Crazy" (extended version)	5:56
4.	"Fly Like an Eagle"	4:14
5.	"Love's Divine"	4:36
6.	"A Change Is Gonna Come"	3:54
7.	"Amazing"	3:02
8.	"Get It Together"	4:26
9.	"My Vision" (featuring Jakatta)	3:45
10.	"Prayer for the Dying"	5:30
11.	"I Can't Stand the Rain"	3:33
12.	"Waiting for You"	3:44
13.	"The Beginning" (US single remix)	4:47
14.	"The Right Life" (radio remix edit)	4:03
15.	"Don't Cry"	6:19
16.	"Rolling"	4:30
17.	"If You Don't Know Me by Now"	3:49
18.	"Violet" (acoustic single version)	4:11

Deluxe edition disc 2
No.	Title	Length
1.	"Killer"	6:21
2.	"Future Love Paradise" (extended EP version)	5:34
3.	"Human Beings"	4:35
4.	"A Father's Way"	4:39
5.	"I'm Alive" (radio remix version)	4:16
6.	"Colour"	5:20
7.	"Free"	3:23
8.	"Latest Craze"	4:27
9.	"System"	3:48
10.	"Newborn Friend" (David Morales Radio Remix)	3:54
11.	"Lips Like Sugar" (featuring Mikey Dread)	5:01
12.	"This Could Be Heaven"	4:43
13.	"Les Mots" (featuring Mylène Farmer)	4:47
14.	"It's a Man's Man's Man's World"	3:51
15.	"Here I Am (Come and Take Me) / Get It Together / Knock on Wood (Medley)" (live 2008)	8:14
16.	"Thank You"	3:47

=== French edition ===
1. "I Am Your Man" (new song)
2. "Kiss from a Rose" (album version)
3. "Crazy" (single version)
4. "Love's Divine" (album version)
5. "Les Mots" – Mylène Farmer and Seal (single version)
6. "A Change Is Gonna Come" (album version)
7. "Amazing" (album version)
8. "Killer" (single version)
9. "Fly Like an Eagle" (album version)
10. "Get It Together" (single version)
11. "Future Love Paradise" (album version)
12. "My Vision" – Jakatta and Seal (single version)
13. "The Right Life" (single version)
14. "Prayer for the Dying" (single version)
15. "I Can't Stand the Rain" (album version)
16. "Waiting for You" (album version)
17. "Don't Cry" (single version)
18. "It's a Man's Man's Man's World" (album version)
19. "Thank You Fa Lettin' Me Be Mice Elf Again" (new song)

=== US limited edition ===
Disc one

1. "I Am Your Man" (new song)
2. "Kiss from a Rose" (album version)
3. "Crazy" (album version)
4. "Fly Like an Eagle" (album version)
5. "Love's Divine" (album version)
6. "A Change Is Gonna Come" (album version)
7. "Amazing" (album version)
8. "Killer" (single version)
9. "Prayer for the Dying" (album version)
10. "Get It Together" (album version)
11. "The Right Life" (remix radio edit)
12. "Future Love Paradise" (album version)
13. "Waiting for You" (album version)
14. "Free" (album version)
15. "Rolling" (album version)
16. "Don't Cry" (album version)
17. "If You Don't Know Me by Now" (album version)
18. "Thank You Fa Lettin' Me Be Mice Elf Again" (new song)

Disc two

1. "A Change Is Gonna Come" (DVD)
2. "I Can't Stand the Rain" (DVD)
3. "It's a Man's Man's Man's World" (DVD)
4. "Knock on Wood" (DVD)
5. "If You Don't Know Me by Now" (DVD)
6. "I've Been Loving You Too Long" (DVD)
7. "Here I Am (Come and Take Me)" (DVD)
8. "People Get Ready" (DVD)
9. "Stand by Me" (DVD)
10. "Kiss from a Rose" (DVD)
11. "Crazy" (DVD)
12. "If You Don't Know Me by Now" (DVD)
13. "A Change Is Gonna Come" (DVD)
14. "It's a Man's Man's Man's World" (DVD)
15. An Interview with David Foster (DVD)

== Charts ==
=== Weekly charts ===
2009–2011 weekly chart performance for Hits
Chart (2009–2011)	Peak position
Belgian Albums (Ultratop Flanders)	39
Belgian Albums (Ultratop Wallonia)	1
Danish Albums (Hitlisten)	37
Dutch Albums (Album Top 100)	20
Finnish Albums (Suomen virallinen lista)	24
Greek Albums (IFPI Greece)	30
Hungarian Albums (MAHASZ)	24
Irish Albums (IRMA)	53
Norwegian Albums (VG-lista)	29
Polish Albums (ZPAV)	40
Portuguese Albums (AFP)	14
Scottish Albums (Official Charts)	51
Spanish Albums (Promusicae)	67
Swedish Albums (Sverigetopplistan)	32
Swiss Albums (Schweizer Hitparade)	25
UK Albums (Official Charts)	37
UK Album Downloads (Official Charts)	69

2012 weekly chart performance for Hits
Chart (2012)	Peak position
Australian Albums (ARIA)	4
French Albums (SNEP)	116
New Zealand Albums (RMNZ)	4

=== Year-end charts ===
Year-end chart performance for Hits
Chart (2012)	Position
Australian Albums Chart	61

== Certifications ==
Certifications for Hits
Region	Certification	Certified units/sales
Australia (ARIA)	Gold	35,000^{^}
France (SNEP)	Platinum	100,000^{*}
New Zealand (RMNZ)	Gold	7,500^{^}
United Kingdom (BPI)	Gold	100,000^{^}
^{*} Sales figures based on certification alone.^{^} Shipments figures based on certification alone.
