= Best 1991–2004 =

Greatest hits album by Seal
- Released: 8 November 2004
- Genre: Pop; soul
- Label: Warner Bros.

Seal chronology
Seal IV (2003)	Best 1991–2004 (2004)	Live in Paris (2005)

Professional ratings
Review scores
Source	Rating
AllMusic	4/5 stars
Rolling Stone	3.5/5 stars
Sputnikmusic	4.5/5

Best 1991–2004 is a 2004 compilation album by Seal, released by Warner Bros. Records. Several different versions of this album were released: one as a single disc containing Seal's greatest hits; a second (titled The Ultimate Collection) with an additional disc of 13 acoustic versions of Seal's greatest hits; a third which included a DVD-Audio disc plus the two The Ultimate Collection discs; a fourth with surround sound mixes of both The Ultimate Collection discs and a collection of music videos as well as the DVD-Audio disc; a fifth, available only for France, containing the single disc of hits along with the track "Les Mots", a duet with French singer Mylène Farmer, as a bonus track.

== Track listing ==
Standard edition / Deluxe edition CD1: Original Version of the Hits
No.	Title	Writer(s)	Producer(s)	Length
1.	"Crazy" (from Seal)	Seal, Guy Sigsworth	Trevor Horn	5:56
2.	"Kiss from a Rose" (from Seal II)	Seal	Horn	4:48
3.	"Killer" (from Seal)	Adam Tinley, Seal	Horn	6:23
4.	"Prayer for the Dying" (from Seal II)	Seal, Gus Isidore	Horn	5:30
5.	"Waiting for You" (from Seal IV)	Seal, Mark Batson	Horn, Batson^{[a]}	3:43
6.	"Don't Cry" (from Seal II)	Seal	Horn	6:19
7.	"My Vision" (Jakatta featuring Seal, from Vision)	Seal, Dave Lee, Rick Salmon, Thomas Newman	Lee	3:44
8.	"Love's Divine" (from Seal IV)	Seal, Batson	Horn, Batson^{[a]}	4:38
9.	"Walk On By" (previously unreleased)	Burt Bacharach, Hal David	Horn, Soulshock & Karlin	3:18
10.	"Get It Together" (from Seal IV)	Seal, Batson	Horn, Batson^{[a]}	3:58
11.	"Fly Like an Eagle" (from Space Jam soundtrack)	Steve Miller	Seal, Rashad Smith^{[b]}	4:14
12.	"Lips Like Sugar" (featuring Mikey Dread, from 50 First Dates soundtrack)	Ian McCulloch, Les Pattinson, Will Sergeant, Pete de Freitas	Nick Hexum, Pablo Munguia^{[c]}, Chad Sexton^{[b]}	5:02
13.	"Human Beings" (from Human Being)	Seal	Horn	4:35
14.	"Future Love Paradise" (from Seal)	Seal	Horn	4:19

Deluxe edition CD2: Acoustic Album
No.	Title	Length
1.	"Bring It On"	4:46
2.	"Killer"	5:39
3.	"Crazy"	4:04
4.	"Colour" (original version from Human Being)	5:34
5.	"Kiss from a Rose"	5:25
6.	"Prayer for the Dying"	5:19
7.	"Love's Divine"	4:45
8.	"Get It Together"	4:38
9.	"Just Like You Said" (original version from Human Being)	5:13
10.	"Touch" (original version from Seal IV)	6:03
11.	"Waiting for You"	3:51
12.	"Don't Cry"	6:27
13.	"Walk On By"	3:05

Notes

- ^a signifies a co-producer
- ^b signifies an additional producer
- ^c signifies a vocal producer

== Charts ==
=== Weekly charts ===
Chart (2004–2005)	Peak position
Australian Albums (ARIA)	21
Austrian Albums (Ö3 Austria)	4
Belgian Albums (Ultratop Flanders)	16
Belgian Albums (Ultratop Wallonia)	4
Danish Albums (Hitlisten)	14
Dutch Albums (Album Top 100)	21
German Albums (Offizielle Top 100)	3
Hungarian Albums (MAHASZ)	21
Irish Albums (IRMA)	39
Italian Albums (FIMI)	18
New Zealand Albums (RMNZ)	7
Norwegian Albums (VG-lista)	3
Portuguese Albums (AFP)	1
Spanish Albums (Promusicae)	72
Scottish Albums (OCC)	53
Swedish Albums (Sverigetopplistan)	10
Swiss Albums (Schweizer Hitparade)	3
UK Albums (OCC)	27
US Billboard 200	47

=== Year-end charts ===
Chart (2004)	Position
Austrian Albums (Ö3 Austria)	65
Belgian Albums (Ultratop Wallonia)	39
German Albums (Offizielle Top 100)	76
Swiss Albums (Schweizer Hitparade)	56
UK Albums (OCC)	183

Chart (2005)	Position
Austrian Albums (Ö3 Austria)	74
Belgian Albums (Ultratop Wallonia)	69
German Albums (Offizielle Top 100)	49
Swiss Albums (Schweizer Hitparade)	25

== Certifications ==
Region	Certification	Certified units/sales
Australia (ARIA)	Gold	35,000^{^}
Austria (IFPI Austria)	Gold	15,000^{*}
Belgium (BRMA)	Gold	25,000^{*}
Brazil (Pro-Música Brasil)	Gold	50,000^{*}
France (SNEP)	Platinum	200,000^{*}
Germany (BVMI)	2× Platinum	400,000^{^}
New Zealand (RMNZ)	Gold	7,500^{^}
Portugal (AFP)	4× Platinum	160,000^{^}
Switzerland (IFPI Switzerland)	Platinum	40,000^{^}
United Kingdom (BPI)	Gold	100,000^{^}
Summaries
Europe (IFPI)	Platinum	1,000,000^{*}
^{*} Sales figures based on certification alone.^{^} Shipments figures based on certification alone.
