= Live in Paris (Seal album) =

Live album by Seal
- Released: April 2005
- Recorded: 6 July 2004
- Venue: L'Olympia (Paris)
- Genre: Pop
- Length: 74:17
- Label: Warner Bros.
- Producer: James Pluta

Seal chronology
Best 1991–2004 (2004)	Live in Paris (2005)	One Night to Remember (2006)

Live in Paris, Seal's first live album, was recorded at L'Olympia in Paris, France. The 2005 release was a two-disc set, containing an audio CD as well as a DVD which featured a video registration of the entire concert. Among the songs which were performed that night were Seal's hit singles "Killer" (originally written and recorded together with Adamski), "Crazy", and "Kiss from a Rose", as well as "Hey Joe", made famous by Jimi Hendrix. It charted at #88 in Sweden and #44 in France.

== Track listing ==
=== CD ===
1. "Crazy"
2. "Get It Together"
3. "Killer"
4. "Just Like You Said"
5. "Dreaming in Metaphors"
6. "Prayer for the Dying"
7. "Love's Divine"
8. "My Vision"
9. "Waiting for You"
10. "Kiss from a Rose"
11. "Heavenly... (Good Feeling)"
12. "Don't Cry"
13. "Bring It On"
14. "Future Love Paradise"

=== DVD ===
1. "Crazy"
2. "Get It Together"
3. "Killer"
4. "Just Like You Said"
5. "Dreaming in Metaphors"
6. "Prayer for the Dying"
7. "Don't Make Me Wait"
8. "Whirlpool"
9. "Love's Divine"
10. "My Vision"
11. "Waiting for You"
12. "Kiss from a Rose"
13. "Heavenly... (Good Feeling)"
14. "Don't Cry"
15. "Bring It On"
16. "Future Love Paradise"
17. "Hey Joe"
18. "Deep Water"
- Timothy S. Wright – bass, rhythm, acoustic guitar tech
