= Live in Paris =

Live in Paris may refer to:

== Albums ==
- Live in Paris (Art Ensemble of Chicago album)
- Live in Paris (John Coltrane album)
- Live in Paris (Jemeel Moondoc album)
- Live in Paris 1973, an album by Can
- Live in Paris 1975, an album by Deep Purple
- Live in Paris+ (Jill Scott album)
- Live in Paris (Diana Krall album) (2002)
- Live in Paris 05, an album by Laura Pausini
- Live in Paris (Psychic TV album)
- Live in Paris (Seal album)
- Live in Paris (Tom Rhodes album)
- Live in Paris (Dee Dee Bridgewater album)
- Live in Paris (EP), an EP by Red Hot Chili Peppers
- Live in Paris (1975) (Lost ORTF Recordings), an album by Pharoah Sanders
- Live in Paris '79, by Supertramp
- Live in Paris 1996, an album by Ahmad Jamal

== Broadcast ==
- Live in Paris, an audio-only broadcast of Coldplay's Music of the Spheres World Tour at Stade de France

== See also ==
- À Paris (disambiguation)
- Live from Paris (disambiguation)
- Live in Paris Zenith '88, an album by Burning Spear
- Live in Paris and Toronto, an album by Loreena McKennitt
- Live in Paris & Ottawa 1968, an album by The Jimi Hendrix Experience
