= The Beginning (Seal song) =

Single by Seal

from the album Seal
- Released: 8 July 1991
- Genre: House
- Length: 5:40 (album version); 4:49 (single version)
- Label: ZTT; Warner UK; Sire
- Songwriters: Guy Sigsworth; Seal-Henry Samuel
- Producer: Trevor Horn

Seal singles chronology
"Future Love Paradise" (1991)	"The Beginning" (1991)	"Killer" (remix) (1991)

Music video
- "The Beginning" on YouTube

"The Beginning" is a song by English singer-songwriter Seal, released in July 1991 by ZTT, Warner UK and Sire Records as the third single from his debut album, Seal (1991). It is co-written by Seal with Guy Sigsworth and produced by Trevor Horn. The song was edited for the UK release, but the US release saw a completely new remix produced for the single. It was a top 20-hit in Finland, Ireland and the Netherlands. In the UK, it peaked at number 24.

== Critical reception ==
Paul Lester from Melody Maker commented, "By several zillion miles the stand-out track from Seal's debut LP—I can't stomach all that electro-trobadour, Richie Havens-with-knobs-on crusading urban blues nonsense meself—'The Beginning' is a stunningly propulsive rush of Housey energy that should ensure the man's residency at the top of the charts for another few centuries." Pan-European magazine Music & Media wrote, "For being a newcomer, this man turned into a household name in no time. This third single off his self-titled album, and follow-up to 'Future Love Paradise' is tuneful, soulful and full of good grooves." Dele Fadele from NME felt the song "lacks the mystical edge that made 'Crazy' so gripping and euphoric—thanks to a Trevor Horn-on-autopilot production—but is still an improvement on the cloying 'Future Love Paradise'".

== Track listing ==
- Maxi CD single
1. "The Beginning" – 4:09
2. "The Beginning" (Giro e Giro mix) – 6:06
3. "The Beginning" (remix) – 5:41
4. "Deep Water" (acoustic) – 3:43
- 7" single
1. "The Beginning" – 4:09
2. "Deep Water" (acoustic) – 3:43
- US CD single
1. "The Beginning" (US remix) – 4:46
2. "The Beginning" (Roundabout mix) – 9:06
3. "The Beginning" (Round the Underground mix) – 7:30
4. "Deep Water" (acoustic version) – 3:42
5. "The Beginning" (UK remix) – 7:04
6. "The Beginning" (Giro e Giro mix) – 6:05
7. "The Beginning" (Round the Underground dub) – 5:48

== Charts ==
=== Weekly charts ===
Weekly chart performance for "The Beginning"
Chart (1991)	Peak position
Australia (ARIA)	82
Belgium (Ultratop 50 Flanders)	22
Europe (European Hit Radio)	6
Finland (Suomen virallinen lista)	13
Germany (GfK)	39
Ireland (IRMA)	12
Luxembourg (Radio Luxembourg)	6
Netherlands (Single Top 100)	16
Sweden (Sverigetopplistan)	40
UK Singles (OCC)	24
UK Airplay (Music Week)	4
UK Dance (Music Week)	26
UK Club Chart (Record Mirror)	28

=== Year-end charts ===
Year-end chart performance for "The Beginning"
Chart (1991)	Position
Europe (European Hit Radio)	56
