= Soul 2 =

Studio album by Seal
- Released: 4 November 2011
- Recorded: 2011
- Studios: Sarm West and Angel Recording Studios (London, UK); Sarm West Coast and The Village Recorder (Los Angeles, California); Capitol Studios and Henson Recording Studios (Hollywood, California); Chartmaker Studios (Malibu, California)
- Genres: Soul; R&B
- Length: 42:07
- Label: Reprise
- Producers: David Foster; Jochem van der Saag; Trevor Horn

Seal chronology
Seal 6: Commitment (2010)	Soul 2 (2011)	7 (2015)

Singles from Soul 2
- 1. "Let's Stay Together" Released: 30 September 2011; 2. "Wishing on a Star" Released: 2 November 2011

Soul 2 is the eighth studio album by British soul/R&B singer Seal. The album was released on 4 November 2011. Like its predecessor, Soul (2008) the album consists of soul classics, and it was produced by David Foster, Jochem van der Saag, and long-time collaborator Trevor Horn. It was preceded by the lead single, "Let's Stay Together" on 30 September 2011.

In the United Kingdom, Soul 2 peaked at number 17 on the UK Albums Chart. As of January 2012, the album has sold 114,654 copies in the UK. In the United States, the album debuted at No. 8 with 27,000 copies sold in the first week. It has sold 115,000 copies in the US as of October 2015.

== Background ==
"One more very important reason why I still make music is the 'gift of collaboration'. I've been fortunate to work with two such industry greats as Trevor Horn and David Foster on this album and they continue to inspire me each and every day."

— Seal on working with the album's producers.

Following the worldwide success of 2008 cover album Soul, Seal teamed up with producers David Foster and Trevor Horn in London and Los Angeles to record Soul 2. The album mainly consists of classic soul songs from the 1970s by artists such as Marvin Gaye, Bill Withers, Al Green, and Teddy Pendergrass. Seal also recorded Bob Dylan's "Like a Rolling Stone", but it did not end up on the album. In a press release, Seal said of the album: "In my twenty years on a journey in the music industry, two things remain constants, the voice and more importantly, the song. I continue to make music because of the chance that this day could indeed be the day I write another great song or have the opportunity to sing one. The songs on Soul 2 are a natural evolution in the arc of soul music from the songs on the first Soul album -- and they are all-time classics."

The album cover photo was taken by Seal's friend & photography blogger, Steve Huff, during Seal's performance in Paris.

== Critical reception ==
Professional ratings
Aggregate scores
Source	Rating
Metacritic	70/100
Review scores
Source	Rating
AllMusic	3/5 stars
BBC Music	positive
Billboard	favorable
The Guardian	4/5 stars
The Independent	3/5 stars

Metacritic gave the album 70 out of 100 based on 5 critic reviews as of May 2012. Caroline Sullivan of The Guardian gave the album four out of five stars writing, "His voice and interpretive skills are such, though, that most tracks fit him like a glove, to the point where, on Rose Royce's "Wishing on a Star", his oak-aged vocal seems a better fit for the remorseful lyric than original singer Gwen Dickey's." BBC Music's Mike Diver gave the album a positive review commenting that "there's nothing bad to be said for Soul 2, and with [Trevor] Horn on production everything shines brightly like the first snowflakes of a new winter. Seal the songwriter might never hit the heights of the early 1990s again – but Seal the singer can still hold his own amongst today's clutch of contemporary soul stars." Andy Gill of The Independent felt that the cover versions were too faithful to the originals, while calling Seal's voice "a natural fit" and the arrangements "impeccable".

== Track listing ==
No.	Title	Writer(s)	Producer(s)	Length
1.	"Wishing on a Star"	Billie Ray Calvin	Trevor Horn	4:13
2.	"Love T.K.O."	Cecil Womack, Linda Womack, Gip Noble	Trevor Horn	5:37
3.	"Ooh Baby Baby"	Smokey Robinson, Pete Moore	Trevor Horn	3:01
4.	"Let's Stay Together"	Al Green, Willie Mitchell, Al Jackson Jr.	David Foster, Trevor Horn, Jochem van der Saag*	3:41
5.	"What's Going On"	Al Cleveland, Renaldo Benson, Marvin Gaye	Trevor Horn	4:27
6.	"Love Don't Live Here Anymore"	Miles Gregory	Trevor Horn	4:10
7.	"Back Stabbers"	Leon Huff, Gene McFadden, John Whitehead	David Foster, Trevor Horn, Jochem van der Saag*	3:36
8.	"I'll Be Around"	Thom Bell, Phil Hurtt	David Foster, Trevor Horn, Jochem van der Saag*	3:15
9.	"Love Won't Let Me Wait"	Vinnie Barrett, Bobby Eli	David Foster, Trevor Horn, Jochem van der Saag*	4:24
10.	"Lean on Me"	Bill Withers	Trevor Horn	3:26
11.	"Oh Girl"	Eugene Record	Trevor Horn	3:53

Digital bonus tracks
No.	Title	Writer(s)	Length
12.	"For the Love of You"	Chris Jasper, Ernie Isley, Marvin Isley, Ronald Isley, Rudolph Isley	4:13
13.	"Ain't Nothin' But a House Party"	Carlton "Dell Sharh" Fisher, Joe Thomas	3:07

Notes

- (*) denotes co-producer

== Personnel ==
- Seal – vocals
- Jamie Muhoberac – keyboards (1, 2, 4, 6–11), synthesizers (1–4, 6–10), synth bass (5, 6, 10), acoustic piano (10), programming (10), percussion (10), melodica (11)
- Pete Murray – keyboards (1–3, 5, 6), acoustic piano (1, 2, 5, 6, 11), orchestral arrangements (1–3), brass arrangements (1, 2), conductor (1, 2), synth bass (2), organ (11)
- David Foster – keyboards (4, 7–9), orchestral and brass arrangements (4, 7–9)
- Jochem van der Saag – synthesizers (4, 7–9), programming (4, 7–9), sound design (4, 7–9)
- Julian Hinton – keyboards (5, 6), acoustic piano (5), programming (5, 6), orchestral arrangements (5, 6, 10, 11), brass arrangements (5), conductor (5, 6, 10, 11)
- Leo Abrahams – electric guitar (1, 3, 5, 10, 11)
- Chris Bruce – acoustic guitar (1, 11), electric guitar (1, 6, 10, 11), bass guitar (1, 3, 4, 6–11), guitars (4, 7–9)
- Lol Creme – electric guitar (2, 3, 11)
- Phil Palmer – electric guitar (2, 3, 6), acoustic guitar (5)
- Trevor Horn – bass guitar (2, 3, 5), backing vocals (2, 5), acoustic guitar (10), melodica (11)
- Ash Soan – drums (1–3, 5, 6, 11), percussion (1)
- Victor Indrizzo – drums (4–10)
- Tim Weidner – drum programming (5)
- Aaron Horn – additional drum programming (6)
- Frank Ricotti – percussion (1, 2, 6), vibraphone (1, 3, 6), orchestral percussion (5, 6)
- Alex Acuña – percussion (2, 5, 7, 8, 10)
- Graham Archer – percussion (10)
- Dan Higgins – saxophone solo (9)
- Jerry Hey – orchestral and brass arrangements (4, 7–9)
- Steve Sidwell – orchestra conductor (3)
- Jo Buckley – orchestra contractor (1–3, 5, 10, 11)
- Everton Nelson – orchestra leader (1–3, 5, 10, 11)
- Jimmie Wood – backing vocals (5)

=== Production ===
- Courtney Blooding – project coordinator
- Katherine Frangetis-Tempestra – A&R coordinator
- Gina Zimmitti – musician contractor
- Thanh Tran – music copyist
- Steve Huff – photography
- Frank Maddocks – creative direction
- Masaki Koike – art direction, design
- Ric Salmon – management for Harvest Entertainment

Technical

- Brian Gardner – mastering at Bernie Grundman Mastering (Hollywood, California)
- Graham Archer – engineer (1–3, 5, 6, 10, 11), additional engineer (4, 7–9)
- Tim Weidner – mix engineer, engineer (1–3, 5, 6, 10, 11), additional engineer (4, 7–9)
- Mat Bartram – string engineer (1, 2, 5, 6)
- Gary Langdon – brass engineer (1, 2, 5), string engineer (3, 10, 11)
- François Lalonde – engineer (4, 7–9)
- Don Murray – engineer (4, 7–9)
- Jochem van der Saag – engineer (4, 7–9)
- Jorge Vivo – engineer (4, 7–9)
- Chris Owens – additional engineer (4)
- Simon Bloor – assistant engineer (1–3, 5, 6, 10, 11)
- John Cranfield – assistant engineer
- Andy Hughes – assistant engineer
- Chris Parker – assistant engineer (1, 2, 5, 6, 10)
- Steve Genewick – assistant engineer (4, 7–9)

== Charts ==
=== Weekly charts ===
Chart (2011–2012)	Peak position
Australian Albums (ARIA)	42
Belgian Albums (Ultratop Flanders)	9
Belgian Albums (Ultratop Wallonia)	3
Canadian Albums Chart	28
Czech Albums Chart	9
Dutch Albums (Album Top 100)	25
French Albums (SNEP)	6
Italian Albums (FIMI)	56
Polish Albums Chart	38
Spanish Albums (Promusicae)	32
Swiss Albums (Schweizer Hitparade)	38
UK Albums (Official Charts)	17
US Billboard 200	8
US Top R&B/Hip-Hop Albums (Billboard)	1

=== Year-end charts ===
Chart (2011)	Position
Belgian Albums (Ultratop Wallonia)	42
UK Albums (OCC)	126

Chart (2012)	Position
Belgian Albums (Ultratop Wallonia)	47
French Albums (SNEP)	146
US Top R&B/Hip-Hop Albums (Billboard)	58

== Certifications ==
Region	Certification	Certified units/sales
Belgium (BRMA)	Gold	15,000^{*}
France (SNEP)	Platinum	100,000^{*}
United Kingdom (BPI)	Gold	100,000^{^}
^{*} Sales figures based on certification alone.^{^} Shipments figures based on certification alone.

== Release history ==
Country	Date	Format
Netherlands	4 November 2011	CD
France	4 November 2011	Digital download
France	7 November 2011	CD
Australia	11 November 2011	CD
Germany	11 November 2011	CD
United Kingdom	21 November 2011	CD
United States	24 January 2012	CD
