= System (album) =

Studio album by Seal
- Released: 12 November 2007
- Recorded: 2005–2007
- Studios: Studio 99 (London, UK); Record Plant and Chalice Recording Studios (Los Angeles, California, USA)
- Genres: Soul; R&B; dance-pop; electronica
- Length: 47:22
- Label: Warner Bros.
- Producer: Stuart Price

Seal chronology
One Night to Remember (2006)	System (2007)	Soul (2008)

Singles from System
- 1. "Amazing" Released: 25 September 2007; 2. "The Right Life" Released: 11 March 2008

Professional ratings
Aggregate scores
Source	Rating
Metacritic	64/100
Review scores
Source	Rating
AllMusic	3/5 stars
Entertainment Weekly	B−
IM	3/5 stars
The Observer	(favorable)
Okayplayer	4/5 stars
PopMatters	7/10 stars
Q	2/5 stars
Rolling Stone	3.5/5 stars
Slant	2.5/5 stars
Uncut	2/5 stars
Sputnikmusic	3/5

System is the fifth studio album by British soul/R&B singer Seal, released on 12 November 2007. In his online blog, Seal described the album as a return to his dance roots and his best album since his debut. However, it is his lowest-selling album to date in the US, selling 155,000 copies in the first year of its release, according to Nielsen SoundScan.

== Track listing ==
All lyrics are written by Seal.

No.	Title	Music	Length
1.	"If It's in My Mind, It's on My Face"	Seal, Eric Schermerhorn, Stuart Price	5:11
2.	"Amazing" (Thin White Duke Edit)	Seal	3:27
3.	"Just Like Before"	Seal, Schermerhorn, Price	4:42
4.	"Loaded"	Seal, Bill Bottrell, Price	5:20
5.	"Wedding Day" (Duet with Heidi Klum)	Seal, Schermerhorn, Price	3:57
6.	"System"	Seal, Schermerhorn	3:48
7.	"Dumb"	Seal, Christopher Bruce, Schermerhorn	4:12
8.	"The Right Life"	Seal, Price	5:09
9.	"Rolling"	Seal, Schermerhorn	4:30
10.	"Immaculate"	Seal	4:04
11.	"Amazing"	Seal	3:02

UK iTunes Store bonus tracks / Japanese bonus tracks
No.	Title	Length
12.	"Amazing" (Kaskade Remix)	6:33
13.	"Amazing" (Bill Hamel Vocal Mix)	9:07

US iTunes Store bonus tracks
No.	Title	Length
12.	"The Right Life" (Eddie Amador's Backroom Stripped Mix)	8:21
13.	"Amazing" (Bill Hamel Vocal Edit)	5:02
14.	"Amazing" (Kaskade Remix)	6:34
15.	"Killer" (Live in Germany)	6:32
16.	"Crazy" (Live in Germany)	5:25
17.	"Get It Together" (Live in Germany)	5:20
18.	"Amazing" (Bill Hamel Stripped Mix)	8:39
19.	"Interview: The Making of System" (Pre-order bonus track)	5:00

== Personnel ==
- Seal – vocals
- Bill Bottrell – Mellotron (3)
- Chris Bruce – additional acoustic guitar (7)
- Eric Schermerhorn – additional guitars (9)
- Heidi Klum – vocals (5)

=== Production ===
- Jeff Aldrich – A&R
- Stuart Price – producer, recording, mixing (1–3, 5–11)
- Nate Hertweck – engineer, assistant engineer
- Ali Staton – engineer, mixing (8)
- Mark "Spike" Stent – mixing (4)
- Jaycen Joshua – mixing (11)
- Dave Pensado – mixing (11)
- Mike Honeycutt – assistant engineer
- Jake Davis – mix assistant (4)
- Alan Mason – mix assistant (4)
- Brian Gardner – mastering at Bernie Grundman Mastering (Hollywood, California, USA)
- Frank Maddocks – package design
- Robin Rankin – photography
- Stephen Alvarez – outside inlay city lights photography

== Charts and certifications ==
=== Weekly charts ===
Chart (2007)	Peak position
Austrian Albums (Ö3 Austria)	5
Belgian Albums (Ultratop Flanders)	56
Belgian Albums (Ultratop Wallonia)	51
Czech Albums (ČNS IFPI)	6
Dutch Albums (Album Top 100)	42
French Albums (SNEP)	33
German Albums (Offizielle Top 100)	13
Hungarian Albums (MAHASZ)	35
Italian Albums (FIMI)	44
Portuguese Albums (AFP)	27
Scottish Albums (Official Charts)	45
Spanish Albums (Promusicae)	71
Swedish Albums (Sverigetopplistan)	37
Swiss Albums (Schweizer Hitparade)	3
UK Albums (Official Charts)	37
US Billboard 200	35

=== Year-end charts ===
Chart (2007)	Position
Swiss Albums (Schweizer Hitparade)	50
Chart (2008)	Position
German Albums (Offizielle Top 100)	88

== Certifications ==
Region	Certification	Certified units/sales
France (SNEP)	Gold	75,000^{*}
Germany (BVMI)	Gold	100,000^{^}
Switzerland (IFPI Switzerland)	Gold	15,000^{^}
^{*} Sales figures based on certification alone.^{^} Shipments figures based on certification alone.
