= À Paris =

À Paris may refer to:

- À Paris, album by Nana Mouskouri
- À Paris, a 1983 EP by The Style Council
- Live à Paris (video)
- KUKL à Paris 14.9.84 a live album released by the Icelandic post-punk group Kukl in July 1985
- Live à Paris (Celine Dion album)
- A Paris..., a 2000 album by Jacky Terrasson

== See also ==
- Live in Paris (disambiguation)
