= Secret (Seal song) =

Single by Seal

from the album Seal 6: Commitment
- Released: 12 September 2010
- Length: 3:23
- Label: Reprise; WEA
- Songwriter(s): Seal
- Producer(s): David Foster

Seal singles chronology
"I Am Your Man" (2009)	"Secret" (2010)	"Weight of My Mistakes" (2010)

Music video
- "Secret" on YouTube

"Secret" is a song by British singer Seal, released on 12 September 2010 in the UK as the first single from his seventh studio album, Seal 6: Commitment (2010). It reached number 82 on the UK Singles Chart.

== Track listing ==
- CD single
1. "Secret" – 3:23
2. "If I Could Ever Make You Love Me" – 4:31

== Charts ==
Chart performance for "Secret"
Chart (2010)	Peak position
Belgium (Ultratop 50 Wallonia)	10
Germany (GfK)	88
Sweden (Sverigetopplistan)	58
UK Singles (OCC)	82
US Adult Contemporary (Billboard)	16
