= Live from Paris =

Live from Paris may refer to:

- Live from Paris (U2 album)
- Live from Paris (Shakira album)

== See also ==
- Live in Paris (disambiguation)
