= The Right Life =

Single by Seal

from the album System
- Released: 11 March 2008
- Genre: Dance; soul; pop
- Length: 5:09 (album version); 4:04 (radio edit)
- Label: WEA
- Songwriter(s): Seal; Stuart Price
- Producer(s): Stuart Price

Seal singles chronology
"Amazing" (2007)	"The Right Life" (2008)	"A Change Is Gonna Come" (2008)

Music video
- "The Right Life" on YouTube

"The Right Life" is a song by British singer Seal, released as the second single from his fifth studio album, System (2007).

== Remixes ==
A remix by Tiësto was released on 11 March 2008 as a single on iTunes.

Promo radio remixes

1. "The Right Life" (Radio) – 4:05
2. "The Right Life" (Tiësto Radio) – 4:59
3. "The Right Life" (Mactong Wonderland Radio) – 5:02
4. "The Right Life" (Eddie Amador's USA Radio) – 4:30
5. "The Right Life" (Trent Cantrelle Radio) – 4:29
6. "The Right Life" (Josh Harris Radio) – 3:51

== Charts ==
Chart performance for "The Right Life"
Chart (2008)	Peak position
Canada (Canadian Hot 100)	67
Germany (GfK)	46
Hungary (Rádiós Top 40)	16
Slovakia (Rádio Top 100)	27
Turkey (Türkiye Top 20)	19
US Dance Club Songs (Billboard)	15
US Dance/Mix Show Airplay (Billboard)	16
