= Violet (Seal song) =

Single by Seal

from the album Seal
- B-side: "Wild"
- Released: 17 February 1992
- Genre: Pop
- Length: 8:31 (album version); 4:11 (single version)
- Label: ZTT; Warner UK; Sire
- Songwriters: Guy Sigsworth; Seal-Henry Samuel
- Producer: Trevor Horn

Seal singles chronology
"Killer" (remix) (1991)	"Violet" (1992)	"Love Is Powerful" (1993)

Licensed audio
- "Violet" on YouTube

"Violet" is a song by English singer-songwriter Seal, released on 17 February 1992 as the fifth and final single from his debut studio album, Seal (1991)—although the version on the single is actually an acoustic, live version, recorded (along with five other tracks from the album) for inclusion on the video version of the album. The acoustic version is a simple arrangement, half the length of the original version.

The video, also titled Seal, opens with the six-track live segment (which was also released as a promo CD The Acoustic Session in the US) and is followed by promo video clips of the first four singles taken from the album.

The random dialogue that appears in the song is from the 1987 movie The Sicilian which Seal watched and became inspired by, and was the reason why this song was written.

== Charts ==
Chart performance for "Violet"
Chart (1992)	Peak position
Ireland (IRMA)	20
UK Singles (OCC)	39
UK Airplay (Music Week)	47
