= Standards (Seal album) =

Studio album by Seal
- Released: 10 November 2017
- Recorded: 2017
- Studio: Capitol (Hollywood); United Recording Studios (Los Angeles)
- Genre: Jazz; swing
- Length: 42:04
- Label: Decca; Virgin EMI
- Producer: Nick Patrick

Seal chronology
7 (2015)	Standards (2017)

Singles from Standards
- 1. "Luck Be a Lady" Released: 15 September 2017; 2. "It Was a Very Good Year" Released: 15 September 2017

Professional ratings
Review scores
Source	Rating
All About Jazz	3.5/5 stars
AllMusic	3.5/5 stars
Express & Star	8/10
Beat	7.5/10
Evening Times	4/5 stars
The Argus	5/5 stars
The Times	4/5 stars
The Soul House	B
Shropshire Star	8/10

Standards is the tenth studio album by British soul and R&B singer-songwriter Seal, produced by Nick Patrick, arranged and conducted by Chris Walden. The album was released on 10 November 2017 by Decca Records and Virgin EMI Records.

== Background ==
With the release of 7, Seal ended his recording contract with Warner Bros. Records. In an interview with Billboard in August 2017, Seal said he doesn't plan on releasing albums in the future: "The concept of going into a studio for however long and making a concept album, so to speak, I don't know if that's relevant these days or if indeed that is practical to do". He also added that he doesn't intend on signing with another major label.

In September 2017, Universal Music announced the release of Standards. Seal said of the album: "This is the album I have always wanted to make. I grew up listening to music from the Rat Pack era, so recording these timeless tunes was a lifelong dream. It was a true honour to collaborate with the same musicians who performed with Frank Sinatra and so many of my favourite artists, in the very same studios where the magic was first made – it was one of the greatest days of my recording career."

== Track listing ==
Standard version
No.	Title	Writer(s)	Length
1.	"Luck Be a Lady"	Frank Loesser	4:36
2.	"Autumn Leaves"	Joseph Kosma; Johnny Mercer	2:55
3.	"I Put a Spell on You"	Jay Hawkins; Herb Slotkin	2:56
4.	"They Can't Take That Away from Me"	George Gershwin; Ira Gershwin	3:16
5.	"Anyone Who Knows What Love Is"	Jeannie Seely; Judith Arbuckle; Pat Sheeran; Randy Newman	4:31
6.	"Love for Sale"	Cole Porter	3:45
7.	"My Funny Valentine"	Richard Rodgers; Lorenz Hart	4:32
8.	"I've Got You Under My Skin"	Cole Porter	3:14
9.	"Smile"	Charlie Chaplin; John Turner; Geoffrey Parsons	4:31
10.	"I'm Beginning to See the Light" (featuring The Puppini Sisters)	Duke Ellington; Don George; Johnny Hodges; Harry James	3:06
11.	"It Was a Very Good Year"	Ervin Drake	4:42

Deluxe version (bonus tracks)
No.	Title	Writer(s)	Length
12.	"The Nearness of You"	Hoagy Carmichael; Ned Washington	3:52
13.	"Let It Snow, Let It Snow, Let It Snow"	Jule Styne; Sammy Cahn	2:39
14.	"Christmas Song (Chestnuts Roasting)"	Robert Wells; Mel Tormé	3:37

Japan Edition (bonus track)
No.	Title	Writer(s)	Length
15.	"Angel Eyes (demo)"	Matt Dennis; Earl Brent	2:55

== Personnel ==
- Seal – vocals
- Jeff Driskill – saxophone solo (10)
- Till Brönner – trumpet solo (3, 7)
- Lynne Fiddmont – backing vocals (3, 5)
- Kenya Hathaway – backing vocals (3, 5)
- Valerie Pinkston – backing vocals (3, 5)
- The Puppini Sisters – backing vocals (10)

== Charts ==
=== Weekly charts ===
Chart (2017–2019)	Peak position
Australian Albums (ARIA)	31
Austrian Albums (Ö3 Austria)	36
Belgian Albums (Ultratop Flanders)	18
Belgian Albums (Ultratop Wallonia)	13
Czech Albums (ČNS IFPI)	14
Dutch Albums (Album Top 100)	88
French Albums (SNEP)	18
German Albums (Offizielle Top 100)	70
Irish Albums (IRMA)	72
Polish Albums (ZPAV)	22
Portuguese Albums (AFP)	9
Scottish Albums (OCC)	21
Spanish Albums (PROMUSICAE)	48
Swiss Albums (Schweizer Hitparade)	32
UK Albums (OCC)	17

=== Year-end charts ===
Chart (2017)	Position
Belgian Albums (Ultratop Flanders)	198
Belgian Albums (Ultratop Wallonia)	94
French Albums (SNEP)	159
