= Future Love Paradise =

1991 single by Seal

Single by Seal

from the album Seal
- B-side: "A Minor Groove"; "Violet"
- Released: 22 April 1991
- Genre: Pop
- Length: 4:19 (album version); 5:31 (EP version)
- Label: ZTT
- Songwriter: Seal-Henry Samuel
- Producer: Trevor Horn

Seal singles chronology
"Crazy" (1990)	"Future Love Paradise" (1991)	"The Beginning" (1991)

Music video
- "Future Love Paradise" on YouTube

"Future Love Paradise" is a song recorded by English singer-songwriter Seal. Released on 22 April 1991 by ZTT Records as the lead track on Future Love EP, it was also included as the second single on Seal's debut album, Seal (1991). The song is written by Seal, produced by Trevor Horn and achieved a great success in several countries, including Switzerland, Ireland and Norway where it reached the top 10. It also hit number 12 on the UK Singles Chart. The version of the lead track on Future Love EP contains an extended vamp and breakdown which fades out later. The album version is shorter and fades out before this section takes place.

== Critical reception ==
Pan-European magazine Music & Media wrote in their single review, that this follow-up to "Crazy" "radiates a similar mesmerising groove and (Trevor Horn-produced) sophistication." Stephen Dalton from NME said, "Best of all, current smash 'Future Love Paradise' presents a panoramic Utopian vision with power and panache. Seal's rich tones slithering and sliding like warm treacle into your most intimate recesses. Oo-er." Miranda Sawyer from Smash Hits felt this "swooping epic" is destined for Britain's Top Five, "and quite right too."

== Track listings ==
CD (ZANG11CD)
No.	Title	Length
1.	"Future Love Paradise"	5:35
2.	"A Minor Groove"	5:54
3.	"Violet"	2:40
4.	"Future Love Paradise" (reprise)	2:27

7-inch (ZANG11)
No.	Title	Length
1.	"Future Love Paradise" (edit)	4:19
2.	"A Minor Groove"	5:52
3.	"Violet"	2:40

12-inch (ZANG11T)
No.	Title	Length
1.	"Future Love Paradise"	5:31
2.	"A Minor Groove"	5:52
3.	"Violet"	2:40

Future Club EP: The Nellee Hooper Remix – CD and 12-inch
No.	Title	Length
1.	"Future Love Paradise" (remix)	6:35
2.	"Future Love Paradise" (beats mix)	6:08
3.	"Future Love Paradise" (a cappella mix)	6:00

== Charts ==
=== Weekly charts ===
Weekly chart performance for "Future Love Paradise"
Chart (1991)	Peak position
Australia (ARIA)	46
Austria (Ö3 Austria Top 40)	15
Belgium (Ultratop 50 Flanders)	16
Denmark (IFPI)	10
Europe (European Hit Radio)	5
Finland (Suomen virallinen lista)	9
France (SNEP)	18
Germany (GfK)	16
Ireland (IRMA)	8
Luxembourg (Radio Luxembourg)	20
Netherlands (Dutch Top 40)	6
Netherlands (Single Top 100)	10
New Zealand (Recorded Music NZ)	25
Norway (VG-lista)	9
Sweden (Sverigetopplistan)	13
Switzerland (Schweizer Hitparade)	7
UK Singles (Official Charts)	12
UK Airplay (Music Week)	5
UK Dance (Music Week)	26
UK Club Chart (Record Mirror)	69

=== Year-end charts ===
Annual chart rankings for "Future Love Paradise"
Chart (1991)	Position
Europe (Eurochart Hot 100)	75
Europe (European Hit Radio)	34
Germany (Media Control)	76
Italy (Musica e dischi)	73
Netherlands (Dutch Top 40)	58
Netherlands (Single Top 100)	89
Sweden (Topplistan)	69

== Release history ==
Region	Date	Format(s)	Label(s)	Ref.
United Kingdom	22 April 1991	7-inch vinyl; 12-inch vinyl; CD; cassette	ZTT	
Australia	20 May 1991	7-inch vinyl; 12-inch vinyl; CD; cassette	ZTT	
