= Human Beings (song) =

Single by Seal

from the album Human Being
- Released: 2 November 1998
- Genre: Pop; adult contemporary
- Length: 4:35
- Label: ZTT; Warner Music UK; Sire
- Songwriters: Mark Batson; Sealhenry Samuel
- Producers: Trevor Horn; Mark Batson

Seal singles chronology
"Fly Like an Eagle" (1997)	"Human Beings" (1998)	"Lost My Faith" (1999)

Licensed audio
- "Human Beings" on YouTube

"Human Beings" is a song by British singer Seal. It was released as the lead single from his third studio album, Human Being.

== Charts ==
Chart performance for "Human Beings"
Chart (1998)	Peak position
Canada Top Singles (RPM)	45
Germany (GfK)	96
New Zealand (Recorded Music NZ)	29
UK Singles (Official Charts)	50
US Adult Alternative Airplay (Billboard)	5
US Adult Pop Airplay (Billboard)	32
