= Amazing (Seal song) =

Single by Seal

from the album System
- Released: 25 September 2007
- Genre: Dance-pop
- Length: 3:02
- Label: WEA
- Songwriter(s): Seal
- Producer(s): Stuart Price

Seal singles chronology
"A Father's Way" (2006)	"Amazing" (2007)	"The Right Life" (2008)

Music video
- "Amazing" on YouTube

"Amazing" is a song recorded by British singer Seal. It was produced by Stuart Price and released as the lead single from his fifth studio album System (2007). Although not a big success on the Billboard Hot 100, it did reach number-one on the Billboard Dance Club Songs chart. The single was released on iTunes on 25 September 2007 in the United States. The song served as the theme song for the third cycle of Germany's Next Topmodel and has been used in advertisements for the CBS reality show, The Amazing Race 12. Along with other songs from the album, "Amazing" was also used on the NBC Sunday Night Football, playing right before commercial breaks. Seal performed the song at the annual Victoria's Secret Fashion Show 2007.

Both the original version of the song and the Thin White Duke edit appeared on the album.

The track was nominated for a Grammy Award on the category of Best Male Pop Vocal Performance.

== Remixes ==
1. Kaskade Radio – 3:12
2. Kaskade Remix – 6:33
3. Kaskade Dub – 6:33
4. Bill Hamel Radio – 5:02
5. Bill Hamel Vocal Mix – 9:07
6. Bill Hamel Dub – 8:39
7. Bill Hamel Stripped Mix – 8:39
8. Thin White Duke Dub – 6:53
9. Thin White Duke Main – 6:55
10. Thin White Duke Edit – 3:27

== Charts ==
=== Weekly charts ===
Weekly chart performance for "Amazing"
Chart (2007–2008)	Peak position
Australia (ARIA)	60
Austria (Ö3 Austria Top 40)	6
Belgium (Ultratop 50 Flanders)	14
Belgium (Ultratip Bubbling Under Wallonia)	5
Czech Republic (Rádio – Top 100)	3
Finland (Suomen virallinen lista)	14
Germany (GfK)	9
Hungary (Rádiós Top 40)	5
Netherlands (Single Top 100)	60
Romania (Romanian Top 100)	73
Sweden (Sverigetopplistan)	54
Switzerland (Schweizer Hitparade)	4
UK Singles (OCC)	74
US Dance Club Songs (Billboard)	1

=== Year-end charts ===
Year-end chart performance for "Amazing"
Chart (2007)	Position
Switzerland (Schweizer Hitparade)	57

Chart (2008)	Position
Austria (Ö3 Austria Top 40)	50
Belgium (Ultratop Flanders)	73
Germany (Official German Charts)	37
Hungary (Rádiós Top 40)	2
Switzerland (Schweizer Hitparade)	72

Chart (2009)	Position
Hungary (Rádiós Top 40)	31

== See also ==
- List of number-one dance singles of 2007 (U.S.)
- List of number-one dance airplay hits of 2007 (U.S.)
