= Human Being (album) =

Studio album by Seal
- Released: 16 November 1998
- Recorded: 1996–1998
- Studios: Sarm West Studios, Sarm Workshops, Whitfield Street Recording Studios, Air Lyndhurst and Studio 52 (London, UK); Armoury Studios and Whistler (Vancouver, British Columbia, Canada); Sarm West Coast, Cherokee Studios, Record Plant (Los Angeles, California, USA); Andora Studios, A&M Studios and Conway Studios (Hollywood, California, USA)
- Genres: Soul; pop
- Length: 51:35
- Label: Warner Bros.
- Producer: Trevor Horn

Seal chronology
Seal (1994)	Human Being (1998)	Togetherland (Unreleased)

Singles from Human Being
- 1. "Human Beings" Released: 2 November 1998; 2. "Lost My Faith" Released: 1999

Professional ratings
Review scores
Source	Rating
AllMusic	3/5 stars
Entertainment Weekly	B+
Rolling Stone	2.5/5 stars
The Rolling Stone Album Guide	4/5 stars

Human Being is the third studio album by British singer Seal, released in 1998. The title track was written about late rappers Tupac Shakur and the Notorious B.I.G. Human Being received mixed reviews ranging from being panned for its overtly dark and moody feel, to being described in terms such as "pop perfection".

A remix of "Lost My Faith" was featured over the closing credits of the 1999 film Entrapment, and the song's single release was accompanied by a music video in which Seal is integrated into scenes from the film alongside Sean Connery and Catherine Zeta-Jones.

The cover art for the album was shot by French fashion photographer Jean-Baptiste Mondino.

== Track listing ==
No.	Title	Writer(s)	Length
1.	"Human Beings"	Seal	4:47
2.	"State of Grace"	Seal; Chris Bruce	5:00
3.	"Latest Craze"	Seal; Earl Harvin	4:28
4.	"Just Like You Said"	Seal; Bruce	4:17
5.	"Princess"	Seal	1:58
6.	"Lost My Faith"	Seal; Reggie Hamilton	4:38
7.	"Excerpt From"	Seal	3:04
8.	"When a Man Is Wrong"	Seal	4:21
9.	"Colour"	Seal	5:22
10.	"Still Love Remains"	Seal	5:54
11.	"No Easy Way"	Seal	4:48
12.	"Human Beings (Reprise)"	Seal	3:28
Total length:			52:05

== Personnel ==
- Seal – vocals, guitars, bass
- Jamie Muhoberac – keyboards, programming, bass
- Lisa Coleman – additional keyboards
- George De Angelis – additional keyboards
- Mike Garson – additional keyboards
- Grant Mitchell – additional keyboards, programming
- Dave Palmer – additional keyboards
- David Sancious – additional keyboards
- Dave McCracken – programming
- William Orbit – programming
- Andy Richards – programming
- Danny Saber – programming, additional guitars
- Chris Bruce – guitars, bass
- Earl Harvin – guitars, bass, drums
- Gregg Arreguin – additional guitars
- Gus Isadore – additional guitars
- Chester Kamen – additional guitars
- Wendy Melvoin – additional guitars
- Ramón Stagnaro – additional guitars
- Alex Acuña – percussion
- Andy Duncan – percussion
- Anne Dudley – string arrangements
- Nick Ingman – string arrangements
- Wil Malone – string arrangements
- Aaron Zigman – string arrangements

=== Production ===
- Trevor Horn – producer
- Steve Fitzmaurice – recording, mixing
- Tim Weidner – recording, mixing
- Michael Perfitt – recording assistant, additional engineer
- Tom Elmhirst – additional engineer
- Gregg Jackman – additional engineer
- Richard Lowe – additional engineer, mixing (7)
- Steve Orchard – additional engineer
- Mike Ross-Trevor – additional engineer
- Alex Black – assistant engineer
- Stuart Brawley – assistant engineer
- Rob Brill – assistant engineer
- Andre Coulam – assistant engineer
- Andy Davies – assistant engineer
- Tony Flores – assistant engineer
- Gordon Fordyce – assistant engineer
- Billy Gibson – assistant engineer
- Barry Goldberg – assistant engineer
- Mark Lane – assistant engineer
- Luis Quine – assistant engineer
- Iain Roberson – assistant engineer
- Paul Silveira – assistant engineer
- Dan Vickers – assistant engineer
- Tim Wills – assistant engineer
- Don C. Tyler – digital editing
- Alexander Areteos – technical assistant
- Justin Fraser – technical assistant
- Stephen Marcussen – mastering at Precision Mastering (Hollywood, California)
- Debbie Caponetta – production coordinator
- Pat Dorn – production coordinator
- Tom Mayhue – production coordinator
- Augusta Quiney – production coordinator
- Melanie Niessen – art direction
- Matt Coonrod – design
- Jean-Baptiste Mondino – photography
- Bob Cavallo – management
- Rebecca Mostow – management

== Charts ==
Chart (1998)	Peak position
Australian Albums (ARIA)	82
Austrian Albums (Ö3 Austria)	21
Canada Top Albums/CDs (RPM)	18
Dutch Albums (Album Top 100)	25
German Albums (Offizielle Top 100)	24
New Zealand Albums (RMNZ)	14
Swiss Albums (Schweizer Hitparade)	18
UK Albums (Official Charts)	44
US Billboard 200	22

== Certifications ==
Region	Certification	Certified units/sales
New Zealand (RMNZ)	Gold	7,500^{^}
United Kingdom (BPI)	Silver	60,000^{^}
United States (RIAA)	Gold	500,000^{^}
^{^} Shipments figures based on certification alone.
