= Seal 6: Commitment =

Studio album by Seal
- Released: 17 September 2010
- Recorded: 2009–2010
- Studios: The Village Studio (Santa Monica, California); Blue Studios (Malibu, California)
- Genres: Soul; R&B; neo soul; pop
- Length: 44:37
- Labels: Reprise; 143
- Producers: David Foster; Jochem van der Saag; Ric Salmon (exec.)

Seal chronology
| Soul (2008) | Seal 6: Commitment (2010) | Soul 2 (2011) |

Singles from Seal 6: Commitment
- 1. "Secret" Released: 12 September 2010; 2. "Weight of My Mistakes" Released: 21 November 2010

Seal 6: Commitment is the seventh studio album by British singer Seal. It was released worldwide on 20 September 2010 with the exception of the United States where it was released on 28 September 2010. The album is produced by David Foster, who also produced Seal's previous sixth studio album Soul. It debuted at number eleven on the UK Albums Chart, becoming Seal's highest-charting album on the chart since Seal IV in 2003. As of January 2012, the album had sold 52,932 copies in the United Kingdom. The album has produced two singles – "Secret" and "Weight of My Mistakes".

== Background ==
In an interview with Reuters Seal attributed the title of the album to his wife Heidi Klum, saying, "I think that commitment is the recurring theme that kept popping up. Certainly the last seven years of my life since I met my wife (Heidi Klum) have been extremely committed. But not just in our personal life. My work has a level of commitment to it. The team around me consists of people who are committed." According to Seal the recurring themes on the album range from "relationships to searching to sacrifice to digging in the dirt." He said, "I had to do that on one or two songs. In order to write things that are going to resonate with people, you are going to have to dig in certain places."

Angus Batey of The Guardian stated in his interview with Seal that:

Commitment is as much about looking back to who he was as celebrating the contentment he feels today. Seal came to the sessions with 41 songs at least partly written – unprecedented for an artist who would struggle to come up with a dozen strong ideas every three or four years. "What's changed is me," he says. "Trevor and David were dealing with two different people."

Seal is still driven by his perfectionist muse, but family life has meant rethinking his priorities. Rather than booking a studio, he rented a house in the town of Montecito, with the plan being to live there while recording. But the pursuit of art had to take second place to his responsibilities as husband and father.

"It was just an hour away from Los Angeles," he says of the house-turned-studio, "so I did come home, to be with my family. [Music] is something that you love doing, but second to the thing that you really love, which is your wife and kids. I mean, it's only music – it's not that important."

== Reception ==
=== Commercial reception ===
On 26 September 2010, Seal 6: Commitment debuted at number 11 on the official UK Albums Chart, outpeaking previous studio album Soul and his Hits album. It became Seal's fifth top 20 album in his homeland.

=== Critical reception ===
Professional ratings
Review scores
| Source | Rating |
|---|---|
| AllMusic | 3/5 stars |
| Billboard | (positive) |
| The Guardian | 2/5 stars |
| USA Today | 3.5/4 stars |

Dave Simpson of The Guardian gave Seal 6: Commitment a mixed review, rating the album two stars, expressing:

At times, the only edge comes from the 47-year-old singer's voice, now raspier than ever. However, hairs are invited to stand up on necks during Silence, which begins as the sort of exquisitely assembled song about loneliness that David McAlmont, say, would kill for, before somehow turning into a scarf-waving anthem. The other standout is Weight of My Mistakes, which mixes contemplative lyrics with an upbeat tune so catchy it requires surgical removal. However, elsewhere, there's too much polished, overwrought, formulaic slop, with You Get Me's line about a "beautiful song you've heard a million times" containing more than a hint of irony.

== Singles ==
"Secret" was released as the album's first single in the UK on 12 September 2010, where it reached number 82. The second single from the album is "Weight of My Mistakes", which has been remixed by Brio Taliaferro for the single release. The music video for the song was directed by Nabil. The radio mix of "Weight of My Mistakes" was due for release 21 November 2010.

== Track listing ==
All tracks produced by David Foster; co-production by Jochem van der Saag.

| No. | Title | Writer(s) | Length |
|---|---|---|---|
| 1. | "If I'm Any Closer" | Seal, Gus Isidore | 3:29 |
| 2. | "Weight of My Mistakes" | Seal, Isidore, Marcus Brown, Mark Summerlin, Michael Thompson | 4:20 |
| 3. | "Silence" | Seal, Isidore | 4:11 |
| 4. | "Best of Me" | Seal, Isidore | 4:23 |
| 5. | "All for Love" | Seal | 4:03 |
| 6. | "I Know What You Did" | Seal, David Foster, Summerlin | 3:37 |
| 7. | "The Way I Lie" | Seal, Peter-John Vettese, Isidore, Brown | 4:34 |
| 8. | "Secret" | Seal | 3:21 |
| 9. | "You Get Me" | Teitur Lassen, Pam Sheyne | 4:27 |
| 10. | "Letting Go" | Seal, Isidore, Summerlin | 3:58 |
| 11. | "Big Time" | Seal, Isidore | 4:04 |

iTunes Deluxe Edition bonus tracks
| No. | Title | Writer(s) | Length |
|---|---|---|---|
| 12. | "Weight of My Mistakes" (Live) | Seal, Gus Isidore, Marcus Brown, Mark Summerlin | 4:39 |
| 13. | "The Way I Lie (Live)" (Live) | Seal, Peter-John Vettese, Gus Isidore, Marcus Brown | 3:20 |

Amazon.com bonus track
| No. | Title | Writer(s) | Length |
|---|---|---|---|
| 12. | "You Get Me" (featuring TinkaBelle) | Teitur Lassen, Pam Sheyne | 4:19 |

Spanish Edition bonus track
| No. | Title | Writer(s) | Length |
|---|---|---|---|
| 12. | "You Get Me" (featuring Concha Buika) | Teitur Lassen, Pam Sheyne | 4:17 |

Finnish Edition bonus track
| No. | Title | Writer(s) | Length |
|---|---|---|---|
| 12. | "You Get Me" (featuring Anna Eriksson) | Teitur Lassen, Pam Sheyne | 4:17 |

=== Deluxe Edition ===
Bonus tracks
| No. | Title | Writer(s) | Length |
|---|---|---|---|
| 12. | "If I Could Ever Make You Love Me" | Seal, David Foster | 4:32 |
| 13. | "You Get Me" (featuring Buika) | Teitur Lassen, Pam Sheyne | 4:21 |

DVD content
| No. | Title | Length |
|---|---|---|
| 1. | "The Making of Seal 6: Commitment" | 21:37 |

== Personnel ==
- Seal – all vocals, instruments, programming, guitars, bass
- David Foster – instruments, programming, arrangements, orchestral arrangements
- Jochem van der Saag – instruments, programming
- Marcus Brown – keyboards, acoustic piano, organ, bass, arrangements (1, 4), instruments, programming
- Mark Summerlin – guitars, instruments, programming
- Gus Isidore – guitars, instruments, programming
- Michael Thompson – electric guitars (2)
- Dean Parks – guitars (9)
- Steve Sidelnyk – drums, instruments, programming
- William Ross – orchestration (1, 3, 5, 6, 8)
- Brad Dechter – orchestration (2, 4, 9, 11)
- Gina Zimmitti – orchestra contractor
- Jerome Leroy – music preparation
- Thanh Tran – music preparation
- Courtney Blooding – additional backing vocals (11)

=== Production ===
- Ric Salmon – executive producer, management
- Tom Whalley – A&R
- Jochem van der Saag – engineer, mixing (1–7, 9–13)
- Dave Russell – engineer, recording
- Jorge Vivo – engineer, recording
- Chris Owen – additional engineer
- Chris Lord-Alge – mixing at Mix LA (Los Angeles, California) (8)
- Keith Armstrong – mix assistant (8)
- Nik Karpen – mix assistant (8)
- Andrew Schubert – additional mix engineer (8)
- Brad Townsend – additional mix engineer (8)
- Armin Steiner – string recording at 20th Century Fox Studios (Los Angeles, California)
- Larry Mah – Pro Tools
- Greg Calbi – mastering
- Steve Fallone – mastering
- Sterling Sound (New York City, New York) – mastering location
- Nabil Elderkin – photography
- Thomas Mastorakos – creative direction

== Charts and certifications ==
=== Weekly charts ===
| Chart (2010) | Peak position |
|---|---|
| Australian Albums (ARIA) | 47 |
| Austrian Albums (Ö3 Austria) | 48 |
| Belgian Albums (Ultratop Flanders) | 25 |
| Belgian Albums (Ultratop Wallonia) | 5 |
| Canadian Albums (Billboard) | 24 |
| Czech Albums (ČNS IFPI) | 3 |
| Dutch Albums (Album Top 100) | 19 |
| Finnish Albums (Suomen virallinen lista) | 27 |
| French Albums (SNEP) | 5 |
| German Albums (Offizielle Top 100) | 46 |
| Greek Albums (IFPI) | 49 |
| Hungarian Albums (MAHASZ) | 12 |
| Italian Albums (FIMI) | 31 |
| Portuguese Albums (AFP) | 15 |
| Scottish Albums (Official Charts) | 17 |
| Spanish Albums (Promusicae) | 17 |
| Swedish Albums (Sverigetopplistan) | 29 |
| Swiss Albums (Schweizer Hitparade) | 8 |
| UK Albums (Official Charts) | 11 |
| US Billboard 200 | 31 |

=== Year-end charts ===
| Chart (2010) | Position |
|---|---|
| Belgian Albums (Ultratop Wallonia) | 38 |
| French Albums (SNEP) | 23 |

| Chart (2011) | Position |
|---|---|
| Belgian Albums (Ultratop Wallonia) | 71 |
| French Albums (SNEP) | 120 |

=== Certifications ===
| Region | Certification | Certified units/sales |
|---|---|---|
| France (SNEP) | Platinum | 100,000^{*} |
| Portugal (AFP) | 2× Platinum | 40,000^{^} |
| United Kingdom (BPI) | Silver | 60,000^{^} |
^{*} Sales figures based on certification alone.^{^} Shipments figures based on certification alone.

== Release history ==
| Region | Release date | Format | Label |
|---|---|---|---|
| Germany | 17 September 2010 | CD; digital download | 143; Reprise; Warner Bros. |
| United Kingdom | 20 September 2010 | CD; digital download | 143; Reprise; Warner Bros. |
| United States | 28 September 2010 | CD; digital download | 143; Reprise; Warner Bros. |
