= Seal (1991 album) =

Studio album by Seal
- Released: 20 May 1991
- Recorded: 1990 – April 1991
- Studios: Sarm West, Beethoven St. and CTS (London, UK); The Manor (Oxfordshire, UK); Ridge Farm (Dorking, UK); The Complex and Lion Share Studios (Los Angeles, California, USA); Cherokee Studios (Hollywood, California, USA); Can-Am Recorders (Tarzana, California, USA)
- Genres: Pop-funk; soul; R&B
- Length: 50:29 (Pre-mixed); 52:15 (Remixed)
- Labels: ZTT; Warner Music UK; Sire
- Producer: Trevor Horn

Seal chronology
Seal (1991)	Seal (1994)

Singles from Seal
- 1. "Crazy" Released: 26 November 1990; 2. "Future Love Paradise" Released: 22 April 1991; 3. "The Beginning" Released: 8 July 1991; 4. "Killer" Released: 4 November 1991; 5. "Violet" Released: 17 February 1992

Seal is the debut studio album by British singer Seal, released in 1991. It contains the singles "Crazy", "Future Love Paradise", "The Beginning", "Killer" and "Violet". The album debuted at number one in the UK and went on to win Best British Album at the 1992 Brit Awards. Seal's following album, released in 1994, was also named Seal; it is usually referred to as Seal II.

There are two versions of the album, with minor and major differences in three songs. The shorter version of "Wild" is more rock-based and heavy than the original. The shorter version of "Violet" contains no dialogue within the singing. Track lengths of both versions are given for each song affected. The only way to tell the difference is the CD Matrix; the Pre-Mix matrix is 903174557-2; the Remixed CD has the same Matrix but with .2 at the end (903174557-2.2). "Killer" is a re-recorded version of the UK number one single by Adamski, which also features Seal on vocals.

Many of the songs (including various ZTT mixes) were featured in the Greg Stump 1991 film Groove Requiem in the Key of Ski. Later Seal tracks appeared in other Stump films as well. The track "Killer" was also featured on the American crime series Homicide: Life on the Street and was included on the 2-disc soundtrack album.

== Critical reception ==
Professional ratings
Review scores
Source	Rating
AllMusic	4.5/5 stars
Chicago Tribune	4/4 stars
Entertainment Weekly	A
Los Angeles Times	3/5 stars
NME	7/10
Pitchfork	7.4/10
Q	4/5 stars
The Rolling Stone Album Guide	2.5/5 stars
Select	2/5
Vox	8/10

In Melody Maker, critic Push wrote that although "some of the ideas could be called pretentious and others sound a tad MOR", Seal showcases "Seal's passionate and emotional nature, a rare fusion of strength and sensitivity". Vox's Isabel Appio praised the album's "textured vocals, sophisticated hooks and full and fascinating orchestral arrangements", while Q's Mat Snow deemed it "a fine debut" which "promises even better vibes to come." Stephen Dalton of NME found Seal "remarkable for its coherence, confidence and sheer character."

Andrew Harrison was unimpressed in Select, panning Seal as "tastefully dull" while describing Seal himself as "so New Age it makes your eyes water". Robert Christgau named "Crazy" the album's sole highlight, designating it as a "choice cut" in The Village Voice.

Retrospectively, AllMusic reviewer MacKenzie Wilson credited Seal and producer Trevor Horn for the overall sound of Seal, which she said stood out amidst "the early-'90s mediocrity of post-hair metal and manufactured synth bands." Writing for Pitchfork, Philip Sherburne stated that despite its occasionally "asinine" lyrics, "you don't come to Seal for poetry; you come for that voice and the way it navigates Horn's productions". He noted the album's origins in the early 1990s UK rave scene and found that it "drew sustenance from the spirit of that volatile era", calling it "idealistic, unfocused, and beautiful in its innocence."

== Track listing ==
Pre-mixed release (903174557-2)
No.	Title	Writer(s)	Length
1.	"The Beginning"	Seal; Guy Sigsworth	5:41
2.	"Deep Water"	Seal	5:57
3.	"Crazy"	Seal; Sigsworth	4:47
4.	"Killer"	Adam Tinley; Seal	6:22
5.	"Whirlpool"	Seal	3:56
6.	"Future Love Paradise"	Seal	4:20
7.	"Wild"	Seal; Sigsworth	5:19
8.	"Show Me"	Seal	6:00
9.	"Violet"	Seal; Sigsworth	8:06
Total length:			50:29

Remixed release (903174557-2.2)
No.	Title	Writer(s)	Length
1.	"The Beginning"	Seal; Sigsworth	5:40
2.	"Deep Water"	Seal	5:57
3.	"Crazy"	Seal; Sigsworth	5:57
4.	"Killer"	Tinley; Seal	6:23
5.	"Whirlpool"	Seal	3:58
6.	"Future Love Paradise"	Seal	4:20
7.	"Wild"	Seal; Sigsworth	5:28
8.	"Show Me"	Seal	6:00
9.	"Violet"	Seal; Sigsworth	8:31
Total length:			52:15

== Personnel ==
- Seal – vocals
- Richard Cottle, Mars Lasar, Mark Mancina, Jamie Muhoberac, Guy Sigsworth – keyboards, sampling
- Robin Hancock – programming
- Gary Maughan – Fairlight CMI
- Ian Morrow – keyboard programming, drum programming
- Gus Isidore, Randy Jacobs, Chester Kamen, Trevor Rabin, Kenji Suzuki, Bruce Woolley – guitars
- Chrissie Schefts – all guitars on "Crazy"
- Trevor Horn, Steve Pearce, Doug Wimbish, Gota Yashiki – bass guitar
- Curt Bisquera, Denny Fongheiser, Keith LeBlanc, John Robinson, Gota Yashiki – drums
- Paulinho da Costa, Andy Duncan, Luís Jardim, Gota Yashiki – percussion
- Anne Dudley – string arrangements
- Maria Vidal – backing vocals

=== Production ===
- Trevor Horn – producer
- Robin Hancock, Gregg Jackman, Steve MacMillan, Tony Phillips, Ren Swan, Tim Weidner – engineers
- Steve Fitzmaurice, Richard Lowe – assistant engineers
- Robin Hancock, Steve MacMillan, Brian Malouf, Tony Phillips, Tim Weidner – mixing
- Michael Nash Associates – design
- Richard Croft – cover photography
- Philippe McClelland – additional photography

== Charts ==
=== Weekly charts ===
Weekly chart performance for Seal
Chart (1991–92)	Peak position
Australian Albums (ARIA)	22
Austrian Albums (Ö3 Austria)	2
Canada Top Albums/CDs (RPM)	20
Dutch Albums (Album Top 100)	4
German Albums (Offizielle Top 100)	7
Hungarian Albums (MAHASZ)	40
New Zealand Albums (RMNZ)	6
Norwegian Albums (VG-lista)	10
Swedish Albums (Sverigetopplistan)	5
Swiss Albums (Schweizer Hitparade)	2
UK Albums (Official Charts)	1
US Billboard 200	27

=== Year-end charts ===
1991 year-end chart performance for Seal
Chart (1991)	Position
Austrian Albums (Ö3 Austria)	21
Canada Top Albums/CDs (RPM)	93
Dutch Albums (Album Top 100)	11
German Albums (Offizielle Top 100)	45
New Zealand Albums (RMNZ)	23
Swiss Albums (Schweizer Hitparade)	21
UK Albums (OCC)	11

1992 year-end chart performance for Seal
Chart (1992)	Position
UK Albums (OCC)	49

== Certifications ==
Certifications and sales for Seal
Region	Certification	Certified units/sales
Australia (ARIA)	Gold	35,000^{^}
Austria (IFPI Austria)	Gold	25,000^{*}
Brazil (Pro-Música Brasil)	Gold	100,000^{*}
Canada (Music Canada)	3× Platinum	300,000^{^}
France (SNEP)	Gold	100,000^{*}
Germany (BVMI)	Gold	250,000^{^}
Netherlands (NVPI)	Gold	50,000^{^}
New Zealand (RMNZ)	Gold	7,500^{^}
Switzerland (IFPI Switzerland)	Platinum	50,000^{^}
United Kingdom (BPI)	2× Platinum	600,000^{^}
United States (RIAA)	Platinum	1,000,000^{^}
^{*} Sales figures based on certification alone.^{^} Shipments figures based on certification alone.
