= Soul (Seal album) =

Studio album by Seal
- Released: 10 November 2008
- Recorded: 2008
- Studios: Chartmaker Studios and Blue Studios (Malibu); Capitol Studios (Hollywood); Record Plant and The Village Studios (Los Angeles)
- Genres: Soul; R&B
- Length: 41:13
- Labels: 143; Warner Bros.
- Producers: David Foster; Jochem van der Saag

Seal chronology
| System (2007) | Soul (2008) | Seal 6: Commitment (2010) |

Singles from Soul
- 1. "It's a Man's Man's Man's World" Released: 10 November 2008 (UK); 2. "A Change Is Gonna Come" Released: 22 November 2008 (UK); 3. "It's Alright" Released: 16 March 2009 (UK); 4. "I Can't Stand the Rain" Released: March 2009 (Brazil); 5. "If You Don't Know Me by Now" Released: March 2009 (US)

"A Change Is Gonna Come" single cover

Soul is the sixth studio album by British singer Seal, which was released on 10 November 2008. The album was produced by David Foster, and co-produced, engineered and mixed by Jochem van der Saag. It is made up of cover versions of twelve soul music classics.

The album charted within the top 10 in twelve countries. In the United Kingdom, the album charted at number twelve. As of January 2012, the album had sold 419,841 copies in the UK. The album peaked at number thirteen in the United States on the Billboard 200 albums chart. It has since sold 547,000 copies in the US.

== Critical reception ==
Professional ratings
Aggregate scores
| Source | Rating |
|---|---|
| Metacritic | 59/100 |
Review scores
| Source | Rating |
| AllMusic | 4/5 stars |
| Billboard | positive |
| Entertainment Weekly | B |
| PopMatters | 5/10 stars |
| Robert Christgau | (1-star Honorable Mention) |
| Rolling Stone | 2.5/5 stars |
| Toronto Star | 3.5/4 stars |
| Vibe | 2.5/5 stars |

Soul garnered mixed reviews from music critics. At Metacritic, which assigns a normalised rating out of 100 to reviews from mainstream critics, the album received an average score of 59, based on eight reviews.

AllMusic's John Bush called it "a sincere, well-considered affair", praising Seal's "caressing vocals" and knowledge of faithfully interpreting the track listing, and Foster's "subtle yet effective production" that use "earthy, organic arrangements and funky beats that are slightly clipped for a contemporary feel." Ashante Infantry of the Toronto Star wrote: "By turns instructive and seductive, the 45-year-old brings weariness and passion to the songs; love to see this performed live." Entertainment Weekly's Mikael Wood wrote that: "As always, Seal sounds great; age has relaxed his singing, and that lends the material an appropriately lived-in vibe."

Rolling Stone's Jody Rosen called it "an unnecessary record", criticising Seal's interpretation of the covers for emitting "a feeling of swank Euro-sophistication that saps the music of much of its emotional oomph." Oliver Wang of Vibe criticised the "milquetoast musical arrangements" and Seal's performance of said arrangements for having "unnecessary vocal runs" and diminishing the "elegant grace" of the originals, saying it "sounds more like an album from a green American Idol winner than a pop veteran with half a dozen albums." While praising the cover of Denice Williams' "Free", Wang concluded that: "Had the rest of Soul followed the same path, it might have made a greater impression. As it is though, the lack of risk-taking leaves this set light on soul."

== Track listing ==
| No. | Title | Writer(s) | Length |
|---|---|---|---|
| 1. | "A Change Is Gonna Come" | Sam Cooke | 3:55 |
| 2. | "I Can't Stand the Rain" | Ann Peebles, Don Bryant, Bernard Miller | 3:35 |
| 3. | "It's a Man's Man's Man's World" | James Brown, Betty Jean Newsome | 3:53 |
| 4. | "Here I Am (Come and Take Me)" | Al Green, Mabon Hodges | 4:10 |
| 5. | "I've Been Loving You Too Long" | Otis Redding, Jerry Butler | 3:08 |
| 6. | "It's Alright" | Curtis Mayfield | 3:47 |
| 7. | "If You Don't Know Me by Now" | Kenneth Gamble, Leon Huff | 3:50 |
| 8. | "Knock on Wood" | Eddie Floyd, Steve Cropper | 3:22 |
| 9. | "I'm Still in Love with You" | Al Green, Willie Mitchell, Al Jackson Jr. | 4:37 |
| 10. | "Free" | Henry Redd, Susaye Green, Nathan Watts, Deniece Williams | 3:27 |
| 11. | "Stand by Me" | Ben E. King, Jerry Leiber, Mike Stoller | 4:06 |
| 12. | "People Get Ready" | Curtis Mayfield | 3:35 |

== Personnel ==
- Seal – vocals, backing vocals (1–3, 6, 7, 9, 10)
- David Foster – keyboards, bass, arrangements, horn arrangements (1–6, 8, 9, 11, 12), string arrangements (1–3, 5, 6, 8, 9, 11, 12), acoustic piano (3, 5, 7)
- Jochem van der Saag – synthesizers, drum programming, sound design, organ (6–8, 12), BGV arrangements (6), arrangements (10)
- Michael Thompson – guitars (2, 4, 6–8, 12)
- Dean Parks – guitars (5, 10, 11)
- Marcus Brown – bass (2, 4, 9)
- Nathan East – bass (6–8)
- Teddy Campbell – drums (8)
- John Robinson – drums (11)
- Jerry Hey – horn arrangements (1, 2, 4–6, 11, 12), string arrangements (1, 2, 5, 6, 11, 12)
- Don Sebesky – string and horn arrangements (3, 8)
- Brad Dechter – string and horn arrangements (9)
- Toyia Barnes – backing vocals (4, 5)
- Angie Fisher – backing vocals (4, 5)
- O'Nita Hutton – backing vocals (4, 5)

Choir on "People Get Ready"

- Keith Allen, Koko Barnes, Toyia Barnes, Sharon Bryant, David Daughtry, Lawrence Dotson, Angie Fisher, O'Nita Hutton, Demeka Jackson, Jason Moralis, Tony Wilkins and Brandon Winbush

=== Production ===
- Jeff Aldrich – A&R
- David Foster – producer
- Jochem van der Saag – co-producer, engineer, mixing
- David Reitzas – recording (live drums, horn, string and choir)
- Chris Owen – assistant engineer
- Jorge Vivo – additional engineer, digital editing
- Brian Gardner – mastering at Bernie Grundman Mastering (Hollywood, California)
- Louis Price – vocal consultant
- Courtney Blooding – production coordinator
- Ellen Wakayama – art direction
- Donny Phillips – design
- Nabil Elderkin – photography
- Ric Salmon – management

== Charts ==
=== Weekly charts ===
| Chart (2008–2009) | Peak position |
|---|---|
| Argentinean Albums (CAPIF) | 12 |
| Australian Albums (ARIA) | 16 |
| Austrian Albums (Ö3 Austria) | 8 |
| Belgian Albums (Ultratop Flanders) | 2 |
| Belgian Albums (Ultratop Wallonia) | 1 |
| Canadian Albums (Billboard) | 11 |
| Danish Albums (Hitlisten) | 5 |
| Dutch Albums (Album Top 100) | 6 |
| Finnish Albums (Suomen virallinen lista) | 23 |
| French Albums (SNEP) | 1 |
| German Albums (Offizielle Top 100) | 15 |
| Hungarian Albums (MAHASZ) | 16 |
| Irish Albums (IRMA) | 21 |
| Italian Albums (FIMI) | 5 |
| New Zealand Albums (RMNZ) | 22 |
| Norwegian Albums (VG-lista) | 7 |
| Portuguese Albums (AFP) | 9 |
| Spanish Albums (Promusicae) | 12 |
| Swedish Albums (Sverigetopplistan) | 6 |
| Swiss Albums (Schweizer Hitparade) | 4 |
| UK Albums (Official Charts) | 12 |
| US Billboard 200 | 13 |
| US Top R&B/Hip-Hop Albums (Billboard) | 4 |

=== Year-end charts ===
| Chart (2008) | Position |
|---|---|
| Australian Albums (ARIA) | 98 |
| Belgian Albums (Ultratop Wallonia) | 33 |
| Dutch Albums (Album Top 100) | 41 |
| French Albums (SNEP) | 2 |
| Swedish Albums (Sverigetopplistan) | 34 |
| Swiss Albums (Schweizer Hitparade) | 58 |
| UK Albums (OCC) | 40 |

| Chart (2009) | Position |
|---|---|
| Belgian Albums (Ultratop overal) | 1 |
| Belgian Albums (Ultratop Flanders) | 16 |
| Belgian Albums (Ultratop Wallonia) | 1 |
| Dutch Albums (Album Top 100) | 44 |
| French Albums (SNEP) | 2 |
| Swiss Albums (Schweizer Hitparade) | 14 |
| UK Albums (OCC) | 145 |
| US Billboard 200 | 75 |
| US Top R&B/Hip-Hop Albums (Billboard) | 28 |

== Certifications ==
| Region | Certification | Certified units/sales |
|---|---|---|
| Australia (ARIA) | Gold | 35,000^{^} |
| Austria (IFPI Austria) | Gold | 10,000^{*} |
| Belgium (BRMA) | 2× Platinum | 60,000^{*} |
| Canada (Music Canada) | Platinum | 80,000^{^} |
| France (SNEP) | Diamond | 1,020,000 |
| Germany (BVMI) | Gold | 100,000^{^} |
| Italy (FIMI) | Gold | 35,000^{*} |
| Norway (IFPI Norway) | Gold | 15,000^{*} |
| Portugal (AFP) | Gold | 10,000^{^} |
| Spain (Promusicae) | Gold | 40,000^{^} |
| Sweden (GLF) | Gold | 20,000^{^} |
| Switzerland (IFPI Switzerland) | Platinum | 30,000^{^} |
| United Kingdom (BPI) | Platinum | 300,000^{^} |
Summaries
| Europe (IFPI) | 2× Platinum | 2,000,000^{*} |
^{*} Sales figures based on certification alone.^{^} Shipments figures based on certification alone.
