= Crazy (Seal song) =

1990 single by Seal

Single by Seal

from the album Seal
- B-side: "Sparkle"; "Krazy"
- Written: 1990
- Released: 26 November 1990
- Recorded: 1990
- Studio: Sarm West (London, England)
- Genre: Pop-funk; dance-rock; soul; R&B
- Length: 4:30 (single version); 5:57 (album version)
- Label: ZTT
- Songwriters: Seal; Guy Sigsworth
- Producers: Trevor Horn; Guy Sigsworth

Seal singles chronology
"Crazy" (1990)	"Future Love Paradise" (1991)

Music video
- "Crazy" on YouTube

"Crazy" is a song written by English singer-songwriter Seal and English songwriter Guy Sigsworth. Produced by Trevor Horn and Sigsworth, it was released by ZTT Records on 26 November 1990 as the lead single from Seal's debut studio album, Seal (1991). The song became his first commercial hit, reaching No. 2 in the United Kingdom, while becoming his first top-10 single in the United States. It has since been covered by several artists, including Alanis Morissette, whose version was released as a single from her 2005 compilation album, The Collection.

== Background and composition ==
Seal wrote "Crazy" in 1990 inspired by the fall of the Berlin Wall and the Tiananmen Square massacre in 1989. In 2015, Seal said of the song's conception in 1990: "I felt the cycle had reached its apex. I felt the world changing and I felt profound things happening."

According to the song's producer Trevor Horn, "Crazy" was made over the course of two months: "'Crazy' wasn't an easy record to make, because we were aiming high."

The song's signature is a keyboard mantra that continually swells and swirls, driven by bass-heavy beats and wah-wah pedal guitars played by Simply Red guitarist Kenji Suzuki. Its floating, ambient stylings established a sound years before The Politics of Dancing by Paul van Dyk or William Orbit's work with Madonna and All Saints. Orbit produced a remix of the track for the single release. Seal's vocals are deeply melodic and soulful, at times with a characteristic rasp, while at others soaring high above the backing track. In an interview with Q, Seal told:

I had no doubt about 'Crazy'. I always thought it was a potential No. 1—even though it never was! It's the first song I wrote on the guitar, and the first song where I said everything I wanted to say in a concise way. Before that my songs had been too long. But as soon as I wrote the hook, I knew it was a potential hit.

== Release and commercial performance ==
In the United Kingdom, the song was released as the first single from the album Seal in November 1990. The song peaked at No. 2 on the UK Singles Chart in January 1991; it is Seal's biggest solo hit in the country. The single sold over 200,000 copies, thus earning a BPI silver certification. It won Seal a number of awards including the 1992 Ivor Novello award for songwriting.

The single was released in the United States in 1991, debuting at No. 83 on the Billboard Hot 100 in mid-June; it peaked at No. 7 in late August and remained on the chart for 19 weeks. It reached the top five on the Modern Rock Tracks chart and the top 20 on the 12-inch Singles Sales chart. It was the most commercially successful single from Seal and was Seal's biggest hit in the US until "Kiss from a Rose", which reached No. 1 in 1995. In August 2003, an acoustic version of "Crazy" charted at No. 4 on Billboard's Hot Digital Tracks chart.

== Critical reception ==
Larry Flick from Billboard magazine felt UK newcomer Seal "comes on like a cross between Terence Trent D'Arby and Lenny Kravitz on this keyboard-driven funk'n'soul jam." Melody Maker named it Single of the Week, complimenting it as "a lush, sumptuous all-pervading piece that's as much of a song as it is a dancetrack." Pan-European magazine Music & Media declared it as "adventurous techno-pop by this promising UK singer who sang on Adamski's recent hit single 'Killer'. Produced by Trevor Horn, this classy, galloping mix of funk, soul and pop is currently riding high on the UK charts. Europe should be next." Jack Barron from NME felt the song "finds all of Seal's talents intact." Another NME editor, Barbara Ellen, also named it Single of the Week", adding, "The best thing about 'Crazy' is the intelligent manipulation of vocals. They're eerie and penetrating anyway, but the production guy has wisely given them some space to breathe and grow, at least he does at the beginning of the record." Bob Mack from Spin noted Seal's "stirring vocal that's being compared to Marvin Gaye", explaining that "based on a '70s cop-show-type bass synth line, 'Crazy' flows natch enough that you hum along on first listening." Eve Zibart from The Washington Post named it "easily the best pop single of 1991", remarking that the "moody" song offers "his simple philosophy: "We're never gonna survive unless we get a little crazy"."

== Retrospective response ==
"Crazy" was awarded one of BMI's Pop Awards in 1993, honoring the songwriters, composers and music publishers of the song. In 1999, the Daily Vault's Jason Warburg stated that it's "an obvious club track with its propulsive synthesizer melody and driving rhythm section. The Shaft guitar part closing out the bridge is a nice touch, too, demonstrating just how effectively Seal has grafted synthesized dance music onto its funk roots." Siobhan O'Neill commented on the song in the 2010 book 10,001 Songs You Must Hear…, "Full of drug and dance scene references, 'Crazy' blends soulful lyrics and husky vocals with Horn's trademark sweeping orchestration and a voguish electronic backing—a combination that, in the wake of this and Massive Attack, became the template for a whole strand of dance music."

== Music video and use in other media ==
The single's music video, directed by Big TV!, features multiple re-creations of Seal himself performing the song against a primarily white background. A female dancer appears just before the bridge of the song, and at the end Seal holds a dove while snow falls on him. The video received heavy rotation on MTV Europe in February 1991.

The song is played during a party scene in the film Naked in New York (1993), is heard in a Baywatch episode, in the trailer for the film The Basketball Diaries (1995) and featured in a scene in Clockers, released in 1995. It is also heard in the middle of "True Calling", the second episode of Season 6 of TV's Cold Case. It was also used as a theme song for the ABC-TV series Murder One, which was transmitted during the 1995–1996 television season. It is also heard in the film Mystery Date. The song featured in the 1999 Robbie the Reindeer film Hooves of Fire, where it is performed by a singing seal. More recently, it was used for a montage in the third episode of the Max Original Series Fired on Mars (2023).

== Track listings ==
- 7-inch
1. "Crazy" – 4:30
2. "Sparkle" – 3:36
- CD
1. "Crazy" – 4:30
2. "Crazy" (extended version) – 5:09
3. "Krazy" – 6:26 (producers: Trevor Horn, Tim Simenon)
- CD maxi single
1. "Crazy" (7-inch mix) – 4:30
2. "Crazy" (William Orbit mix) – 5:25
3. "Crazy" (acoustic version / instrumental version) – 6:57
4. "Crazy" (a cappella mix) – 3:27
5. "Sparkle" (extended version) – 6:23
6. "Krazy" – 6:27
7. "Crazy" (Do You Know the Way to L.A. mix) – 3:50
8. "Crazy" (Chick on My Tip mix) – 6:47

== Charts ==
=== Weekly charts ===
1991 weekly chart performance for "Crazy"
Chart (1991)	Peak position
Australia (ARIA)	9
Austria (Ö3 Austria Top 40)	5
Belgium (Ultratop 50 Flanders)	1
Canada Top Singles (RPM)	9
Denmark (IFPI)	10
Europe (Eurochart Hot 100)	1
Europe (European Hit Radio)	3
Finland (Suomen virallinen lista)	18
France (SNEP)	5
Germany (GfK)	2
Greece (IFPI)	4
Ireland (IRMA)	6
Israel (Israeli Singles Chart)	3
Italy (Musica e dischi)	8
Luxembourg (Radio Luxembourg)	1
Netherlands (Dutch Top 40)	1
Netherlands (Single Top 100)	1
New Zealand (Recorded Music NZ)	8
Norway (VG-lista)	3
Sweden (Sverigetopplistan)	1
Switzerland (Schweizer Hitparade)	1
UK Singles (OCC)	2
UK Airplay (Music Week)	3
US Billboard Hot 100	7
US 12-inch Singles Sales (Billboard)	17
US Modern Rock Tracks (Billboard)	5
US Cash Box Top 100	6

2003 weekly chart performance for "Crazy"
Chart (2003)	Peak position
US Hot Digital Songs (Billboard)	4

=== Year-end charts ===
Year-end chart performance for "Crazy"
Chart (1991)	Position
Australia (ARIA)	46
Austria (Ö3 Austria Top 40)	19
Belgium (Ultratop)	23
Canada Top Singles (RPM)	63
Europe (Eurochart Hot 100)	9
Europe (European Hit Radio)	12
Germany (Media Control)	13
Israel (Israeli Singles Chart)	17
Italy (Musica e dischi)	60
Netherlands (Dutch Top 40)	5
Netherlands (Single Top 100)	11
New Zealand (RIANZ)	34
Sweden (Topplistan)	7
Switzerland (Schweizer Hitparade)	5
UK Singles (OCC)	38
US Billboard Hot 100	75
US Modern Rock Tracks (Billboard)	28
US Cash Box Top 100	41

== Certifications ==
Certifications for "Crazy"
Region	Certification	Certified units/sales
New Zealand (RMNZ)	Gold	15,000^{‡}
United Kingdom (BPI)	Silver	200,000^{^}
^{^} Shipments figures based on certification alone.^{‡} Sales+streaming figures based on certification alone.

== Release history ==
Release dates and formats for "Crazy"
Region	Date	Format(s)	Label(s)	Ref.
United Kingdom	26 November 1990	7-inch vinyl; 12-inch vinyl; CD; cassette	ZTT	
Australia	21 January 1991	7-inch vinyl; 12-inch vinyl; CD; cassette	ZTT	
Australia	1 April 1991	12-inch vinyl; CD (William Orbit mix)	ZTT	
Japan	25 April 1991	CD	ZTT; WEA	

== Alanis Morissette version ==
"Crazy"

Single by Alanis Morissette

from the album The Collection
- Released: 31 October 2005
- Recorded: 2005
- Genre: Electronic; dance-pop; dance rock
- Length: 3:39; 5:22 (alternative take)
- Label: Maverick
- Songwriters: Seal (lyrics); Guy Sigsworth (music)
- Producer: Glen Ballard

Alanis Morissette singles chronology
"Eight Easy Steps" (2004)	"Crazy" (2005)	"Underneath" (2008)

Music video
- "Crazy" on YouTube

Alanis Morissette covered the song for a Gap advertisement in 2005, and a James Michael-produced remix of her version, which was originally produced by Morissette's longtime collaborator Glen Ballard, was released as a single from her greatest hits album, The Collection (2005). Her version is briefly heard over an establishing shot of Central Park in the 2006 film The Devil Wears Prada. Morissette said of the cover, "it's poking fun not only at how I've been perceived but also at what I've accurately been perceived as." She called the main line in the song, "You're never going to survive/Unless you get a little crazy", "one of the simplest, yet most profound statements."

=== Chart performances ===
Released in the US in October 2005, Morissette's cover was less successful than Seal's original; it failed to chart on the Hot 100, instead debuting and peaking at No. 4 on the Bubbling Under Hot 100 Singles chart (which comprises the most popular songs yet to enter the Hot 100) in late November. It was another top-10 hit for Morissette on the Adult Top 40 chart and was popular in nightclubs, becoming Morissette's second top-10 Dance Club Play hit, after "Eight Easy Steps" (2004). It entered the top 40 across much of Europe, but in the United Kingdom it became Morissette's lowest-peaking single, reaching No. 65.

=== Music video ===
The single's video was directed by Meiert Avis, who directed the video for Morissette's "Everything" (2004), and shot in Los Angeles, California in the week ending 24 September. In it Morissette is seen walking the streets at night, performing the song in a club and obsessively following a man (played by Chris William Martin) and his girlfriend. Eventually, Morissette confronts the man at a party. During a 22 October appearance on the UK television show Popworld, Morissette said the video's final shot, which is of a photo showing her and the woman close together, is supposed to reveal to the audience (who, before this point, are meant to believe the man is her ex-boyfriend) that she was actually following the woman.

=== Track listing ===
1. "Crazy" (Claude Le Gache club mix) (edit)
2. "Crazy" (Eddie Baez Coo Coo club mix) (edit)
3. "Crazy" (Monk Mix of Meds) (edit)
4. "Crazy" (Interstate mix) (edit)
5. "Crazy" (Claude Le Gache mixshow)

=== Charts ===
==== Weekly charts ====
Weekly chart performance for "Crazy" by Alanis Morissette
Chart (2005–2006)	Peak position
Australia (ARIA)	61
Austria (Ö3 Austria Top 40)	20
Belgium (Ultratip Bubbling Under Flanders)	4
Belgium (Ultratip Bubbling Under Wallonia)	3
Canada Hot AC Top 30 (Radio & Records)	15
Czech Republic (Rádio Top 100 Oficiální)	22
Finland (Suomen virallinen lista)	6
Germany (GfK)	38
Greece (IFPI)	22
Hungary (Editors' Choice Top 40)	25
Italy (FIMI)	3
Italy (Musica e Dischi)	2
Netherlands (Dutch Top 40 Tipparade)	4
Netherlands (Single Top 100)	40
Russia Airplay (TopHit)	73
Scottish Singles Sales (Official Charts)	43
Spain (Promusicae)	12
Sweden (Sverigetopplistan)	57
Switzerland (Schweizer Hitparade)	31
UK Singles (Official Charts)	65
US Adult Top 40 (Billboard)	10
US Bubbling Under Hot 100 Singles (Billboard)	4
US Dance Club Play (Billboard)	6
US Dance Singles Sales (Billboard)	6
US Pop 100 (Billboard)	95

==== Monthly charts ====
Monthly chart performance for "Crazy" by Alanis Morissette
Chart (2006)	Peak position
Russia Airplay (TopHit)	79

=== Release history ===
Release dates and formats for "Crazy" by Alanis Morissette
Region	Date	Format(s)	Label(s)	Ref.
United States	10 October 2005	Hot AC; triple A; contemporary hit radio	Maverick	
United Kingdom	31 October 2005	CD	Maverick	

== Other cover versions ==
The hard rock band Talisman covered the song on their 1995 album Life, and a version by power metal band Iron Savior is included as a bonus track on their 2002 album, Condition Red.

Two cover versions were released in 2003: one by punk covers band Me First and the Gimme Gimmes on their 2003 album Take a Break, and another by Alternative metal band Mushroomhead, whose version was released as a single and appears as a hidden track on their 2003 album, XIII. In 2004, the song was covered by Brooklyn Bounce.

Indie artist Brian Eaton covered the song on his 2011 pop/rock album, Graphic Nature.

French pop singer Tal covered this song for her debut album, Le droit de rêver, in the deluxe edition released in 2012.

In 2022, Denver Colorado-based alt-rock band Ancient Echoes released a cover version.
