= Seal (musician) =

English singer (born 1963)

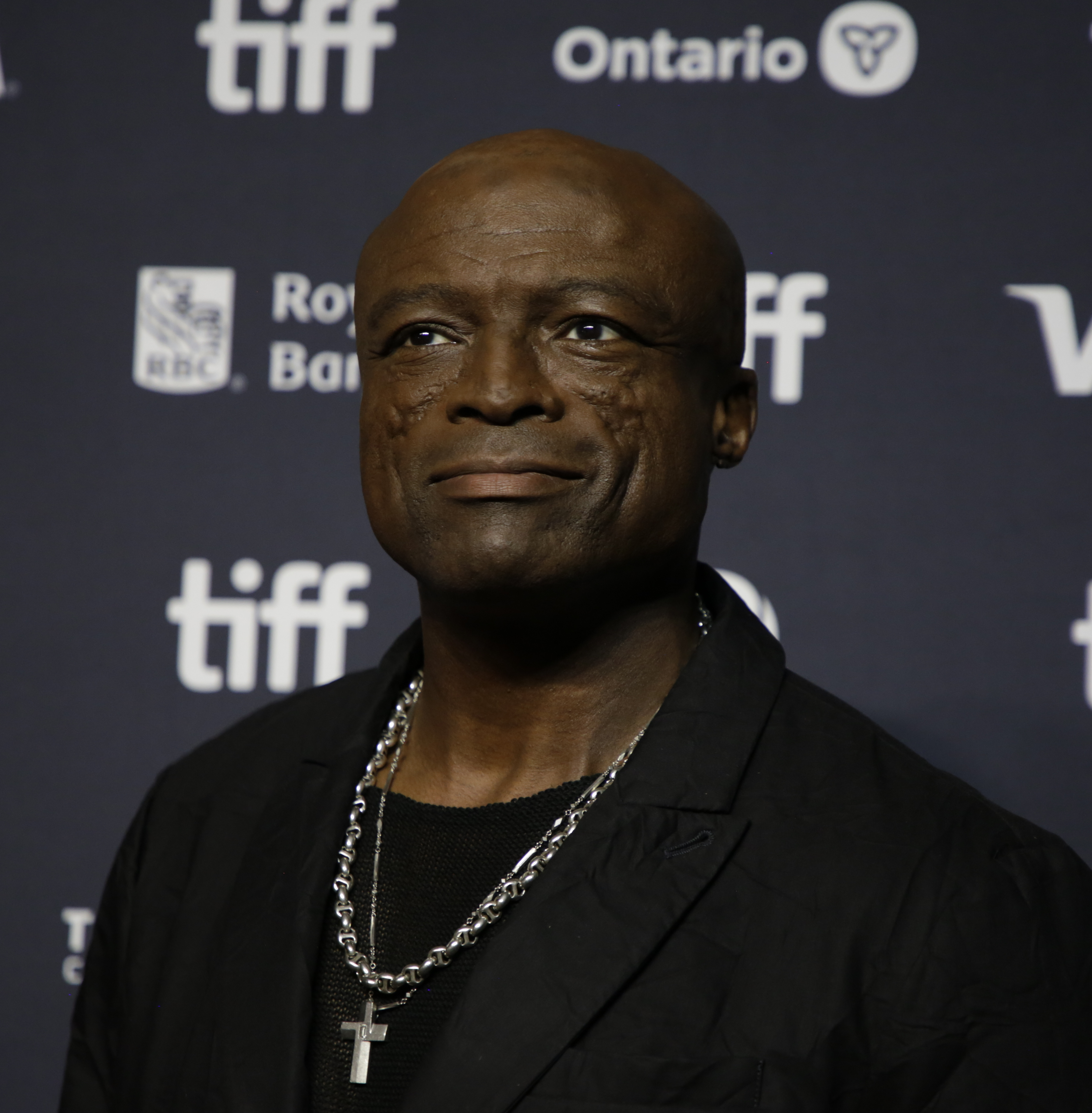
- Seal at the 2025 Toronto International Film Festival

Background information
- Also known as: Sealhenry Samuel
- Born: Seal Henry Olusegun Olumide Adeola Samuel; 19 February 1963 (age 63); Paddington, London, England
- Genres: Soul; R&B; pop; dance; rock
- Occupations: Singer; songwriter; record producer
- Works: Seal discography
- Years active: 1987–present
- Labels: ZTT; Sire; Warner Bros.; Reprise; Decca
- Spouse: Heidi Klum (m. 2005; div. 2014)
- Children: 4, including adopted daughter Leni Klum
- Awards: Full list
- Website: sealofficial.com

Seal Henry Olusegun Olumide Adeola Samuel ( born 19 February 1963), known mononymously as Seal, is a British singer, songwriter, and record producer. He is the recipient of three Brit Awards, four Grammy Awards and an MTV Video Music Award, with more than 20 million albums or singles sold. He signed with record producer Trevor Horn's ZTT Records to release his eponymous debut studio album (1991). A critical and commercial success, it spawned the singles "Crazy" and "Killer", which peaked at numbers two and one on the UK singles chart, respectively, while both entered the US Billboard Hot 100. His 1994 single, "Kiss from a Rose", peaked atop the latter chart after its inclusion on the accompanying film soundtracks for The NeverEnding Story III and Batman Forever.

"Kiss from a Rose" spawned from Seal's second eponymous studio album (1994), which peaked atop the UK Albums Chart along with its predecessor. His following albums—Human Being (1998), Seal IV (2003), System (2007), Soul (2008), Seal 6: Commitment (2010), Soul 2 (2011), 7 (2015) and Standards (2017)—were each met with critical praise. As a songwriter, Seal has won two Ivor Novello Awards for "Best Song Musically and Lyrically" by the British Academy of Songwriters, Composers and Authors for "Killer" and "Crazy".

He served as a coach on The Voice Australia in 2012, 2013, and 2017.

== Early life ==
Seal Henry Olusegun Olumide Adeola Samuel was born on 19 February 1963 at St Mary's Hospital in Paddington, London, to a Nigerian mother of Yoruba origin, Adebisi Ogundeji, and a Brazilian father, Francis Samuel. His middle names "Olusegun Olumide Adeola" are a combination of traditional given names from the Yoruba language. Seal was raised by a foster family in Westminster, London. He received a two-year diploma in architecture and had various jobs in the London area.

== Career ==
=== Early career ===
In the 1980s, Seal spent a short time singing in local clubs and bars. In 1987, he joined Push, a British funk band, and toured with them in Japan. In Thailand, he joined a blues band for a while before separating from the group and journeying throughout India on his own. He returned to England, sleeping on the couch of friend Julian Bunster, then a model. He sometimes asked him, "Do I sing well?", to which he often received the response that he sang better than most current artists. Then he met the producer Adamski to whom Seal provided lyrics and vocals on Adamski's single "Killer".

=== Initial success: 1990s ===
"Killer" eventually reached number one in the UK. Seal subsequently signed to ZTT Records and released his self-titled début album (produced by Trevor Horn) in 1991. Two versions of the album are known to be in circulation: the original "premix" version and a second, more common version with an updated mix. This is attributed to the demand for a produced single rushing the final album edit and, as Seal puts it, producer Horn's "inability to let go".

Seal was positively received by critics. The singles "Crazy", "Future Love Paradise" and his own rendition of "Killer" performed well on the charts. In particular, "Crazy" became an international hit in 1991, reaching number two in the UK Singles Chart and number seven on the Billboard Hot 100 in the US. Seal stole the show at the 1992 Brit Awards held at the Hammersmith Odeon, London, with the first hat-trick of wins in the history of the event. He won in three categories: Best British Male, Best British Video ("Killer") and Best British Album (Seal).

In 1992, Seal appeared on the Red Hot Organization's compilation CD Red Hot + Dance, contributing an exclusive track "Crazy (If I Was Trev Mix)". The album, featuring George Michael and Madonna among others, raised money and awareness in support of the AIDS epidemic by donating all proceeds to AIDS charities.

Jeff Beck and Seal performed a cover of "Manic Depression" for the 1993 album Stone Free: A Tribute to Jimi Hendrix. Seal also contributed vocals to a cover of John Lennon's "Imagine" for the 2010 Herbie Hancock album, The Imagine Project along with P!nk, India.Arie, Jeff Beck, Konono Nº1, Oumou Sangaré and others.

After Seal regrouped with Trevor Horn, his second album, also self-titled, was released in 1994. A success, the album featured the singles "Prayer for the Dying" and "Newborn Friend", and later received a Grammy nomination for Album of the Year. "Prayer for the Dying" became a minor pop hit in the US, peaking at number 21 on the Billboard Hot 100. A third single, "Kiss from a Rose", performed modestly when released, but was later featured to much wider popularity when it was remixed for the soundtrack to Batman Forever. "Kiss from a Rose" won a Grammy Award for Record of the Year and Grammy Award for Song of the Year in 1996, becoming Seal's best-performing single on the US market (it topped the Billboard Hot 100 in late August 1995) and hit number four in the UK.

In 1998, Seal released Human Being. The album was the product of a turbulent time in his life, including a split and later reconciliation with producer Horn, as well as Seal's parting with ZTT Records and his signing with Warner Bros. Records in 1997. The record was panned upon its release. It received gold record certification by the RIAA just two months after its release date. The album provided two singles – "Human Beings" and "Lost My Faith".

=== 2000s ===
In 2001, fans awaited the arrival of a new album, announced as Togetherland. After a protracted postproduction period, the album was cancelled. The official word was that Seal simply did not think it made the grade, although this conflicts with other reports that said the album was turned down by the label because producers felt the album would not be commercially successful. Even so, one single was released from the album; "This Could Be Heaven" was released in the US and featured on The Family Man soundtrack. Since December 2006, Seal has indicated that he has plans to excerpt cuts from Togetherland and make them available for streaming download. Meanwhile, Seal co-wrote and provided vocals for the hit single "My Vision" from Jakatta in 2002. He also recorded a successful duet with French singer Mylène Farmer called "Les Mots" during that same period. Also in 2002, Seal lent his vocals to the song "You Are My Kind", the fourth track on Santana's album Shaman.

In 2003, Seal released his fourth album Seal IV. Although it never achieved the sales figures of either of his first two albums, this release brought him back into the public eye in the United States and continental Europe. Singles from the album include "Waiting for You", "Get It Together" and "Love's Divine"; the latter was released in 2004 and was a big hit in several European countries.

In 2004, a greatest-hits album entitled Best 1991–2004 was released, including a cover of the Bacharach/David classic "Walk On By" and a cover of Echo & the Bunnymen's "Lips Like Sugar". An edition of the album was available that included an extra CD with acoustic versions of some of Seal's hits. Also in 2004, Seal performed shows at the Olympia Theatre in Paris. The show of 6 July 2004 was recorded and released about one year after as a CD/DVD package, simply titled Live in Paris.

In June 2005, Seal recorded a concert which was subsequently released in 2006, entitled One Night to Remember, as a CD/DVD combination. The DVD includes a "making of" documentary in addition to the live performance. Recorded in a historic steel mill, the Altes Kesselhaus ("old boiler house"), in Düsseldorf, Germany, this performance includes a version of Brahms' Lullaby which Seal sings in German and then in English. Unlike earlier recordings in which Seal is accompanied by his band, a full orchestra and choir of 52 musicians accompanies the singer.

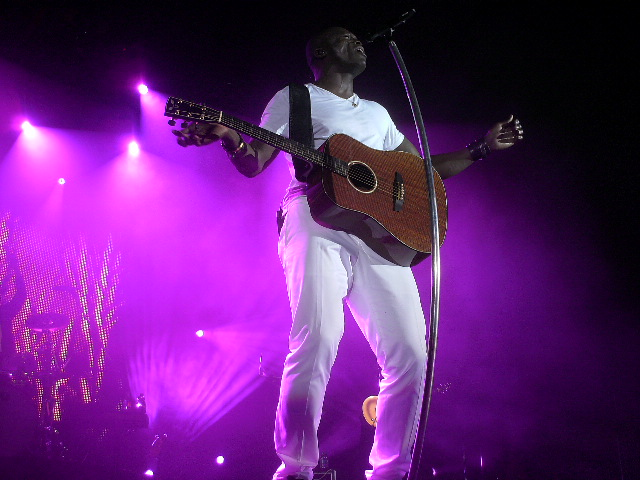
Seal performing in 2008

System was released in the UK on 12 November 2007 and in the US on 13 November 2007. Seal describes the album as more dance-oriented, apparently a return to the roots of his first album. On the track titled "Wedding Day", Seal sings a duet with his then-wife, model Heidi Klum. The album's first single, "Amazing", was released on 25 September 2007 and nominated for the "Best Male Pop Vocal Performance" Grammy at the 2007 50th Annual Grammy Awards.

Seal performed "Amazing" and the Beatles' "Lucy in the Sky With Diamonds" at the 2007 Royal Variety Performance. Seal also performed "Amazing" at the 2007 Victoria's Secret Fashion Show in December, as well as the duet "Wedding Day" with his wife. Other performers at the 2007 Victoria's Secret Fashion Show include the Spice Girls and will.i.am of the Black Eyed Peas. He appeared on the American Idol season-seven finale, singing with third-place contestant Syesha Mercado.

Seal's sixth studio album, Soul, was released on 3 November 2008 internationally and on 11 November 2008 in the US. It contains 11 soul classics produced by David Foster. The first single was a cover of Sam Cooke's song "A Change Is Gonna Come".

On 14 March 2009, Seal performed a song from the album and coached the participants on the "Top 9-Show" of the sixth season of the German TV show Deutschland sucht den Superstar (German Idol). On 4 December 2009, Hits, a compilation album, was released. It contains two new tracks, "I Am Your Man" and "Thank You".

=== 2010s ===
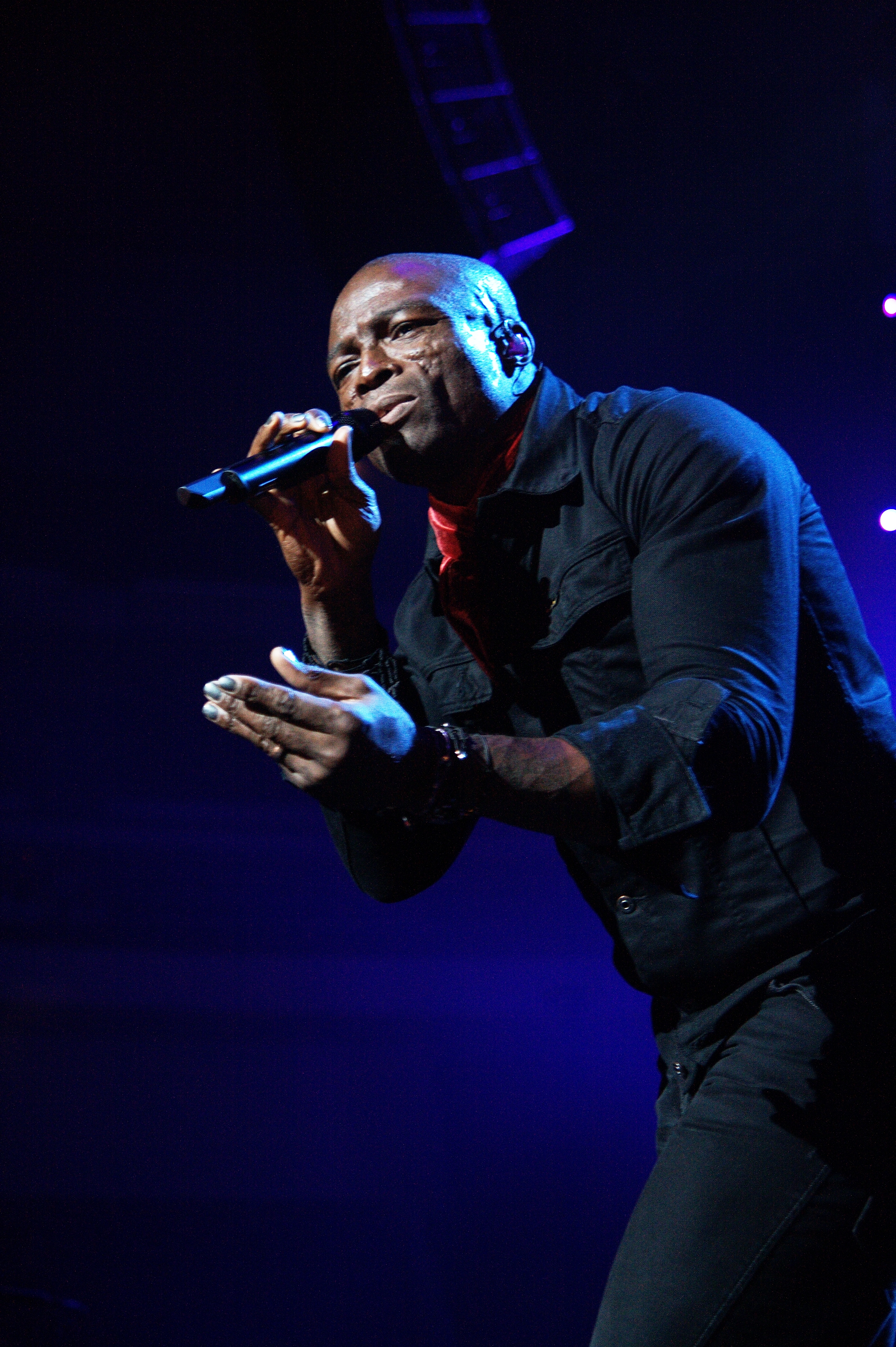
Seal in 2011

Seal's seventh studio album, Seal 6: Commitment was released on 20 September 2010 internationally and 28 September 2010 in the US. The first single "Secret" was released 10 August 2010 on iTunes in the US and in the UK on 13 September 2010. This album was said to be inspired by his wife, Heidi. On 7 November 2011, Seal released his second cover album of classic soul songs, Soul 2, through Reprise Records.

==== Performance in Chechnya, 2011 ====
In October 2011, Seal was criticized by human-rights groups for appearing at an event in Grozny, Chechnya, that turned into a birthday celebration for Ramzan Kadyrov, the President of Chechnya. Also appearing at the event were the actress Hilary Swank, actor Jean-Claude Van Damme and violinist Vanessa-Mae. The New York-based Human Rights Foundation claims that it sent letters to invitees in advance of the event noting Kadyrov's record and asking them to decline the invitations. Human Rights Watch sent an enquiry to Seal regarding his performance at the event and released a statement about the incident that said:

Ramzan Kadyrov is linked to a litany of horrific human rights abuses. It's inappropriate for stars to get paid to party with him. It bolsters his image and legitimizes a brutal leader and his regime. And getting paid to be part of such a lavish show in Chechnya trivialises the suffering of countless victims of human rights abuses there.

Seal refused to apologise for appearing at the event, sending a message from his Twitter account telling people to "leave me out of your politics". Seal was reported to have made $500,000 for singing at the party.

==== 2012–2017 ====
In 2012, Seal was one of the four vocal coaches in the first season of the Australian version of the reality singing competition The Voice. He was the coach of the series winner Karise Eden. Seal returned to The Voice season two, which debuted on 7 April 2013, where he became the winning coach once again, coaching eventual winner Harrison Craig. He did not return for the third season in 2014, with the Nine Network stating that Seal "will take a break from the third season of The Voice to focus on music and material for a new album." Channel NINE announced on 8 November 2016 that Seal would be returning alongside Delta Goodrem to The Voice as a coach in 2017, replacing Jessie J after a three-year hiatus.

On 15 November 2014, Seal joined the charity group Band Aid 30 along with other British and Irish pop acts, recording the latest version of the track "Do They Know It's Christmas?" at Sarm West Studios in Notting Hill, London, to raise money for the 2014 Ebola crisis in West Africa. Seal was cast as Pontius Pilate in Tyler Perry's musical rendition of The Passion, which aired on Fox on 20 March 2016.

Seal began work on a new album, initially entitled Let Yourself, produced again by Horn. In February 2015, Horn said the album was nearly finished. Seal later re-signed to Perfect Songs and had a two-week writing period in Horn's Los Angeles studio booked for October 2012. Stewart Copeland (formerly of the Police) said that month on Twitter that Trevor Horn and Lol Crème were working with Seal on a project. In April 2013, Seal said on Twitter that the new album would be released in about June (which did not eventuate) and that tracks to be included were "Let Yourself", "Do You Ever" and "Laying with an Angel". The album was later retitled Beautifully Scarred. On 10 September 2015, Seal announced that the album, now named 7, would be released on 6 November 2015.

Seal released the album Standards in November 2017. The album was produced by classical crossover composer Nick Patrick. It received a nomination for Best Traditional Pop Vocal Album at the 2018 Annual Grammy Awards.

=== 2020s ===
In 2022, Seal launched his own limited-edition camera with Leica, a Q2 camera called Dawn, which is limited to 500 cameras.

Seal announced a North American tour in 2023 with Trevor Horn as the musical director, who also doubles as the show opener with his band, The Buggles. In 2024, he released an alternate version of "Kiss from a Rose" with a deluxe edition of the album Seal upon its 30th anniversary.

He released a new song, "All I Know is Now", produced by Horn, on 14 February 2025.

== Personal life ==
Seal's brother, Jeymes Samuel, better known as the Bullitts, is also a singer-songwriter and filmmaker.

Seal first began dating German model Heidi Klum in February 2004, shortly after she announced her pregnancy and the end of her relationship with Italian Formula One team manager Flavio Briatore. Klum gave birth to Briatore's daughter Leni in May 2004 in New York City with Seal at her side. According to Klum, Briatore is not involved in fathering duties and she has stated emphatically that Seal is Leni's father. Seal is her only father figure and he has praised Briatore for keeping his distance.

Seal proposed to Klum on 23 December 2004 in a quinzee he had built on a glacier in Whistler, British Columbia. On 10 May 2005, the couple married on a beach in Mexico near Seal's home on Costa Careyes. Every year during their marriage, Seal and Klum renewed their vows on their anniversary with close friends and family. About these renewals, Seal said in 2010, "Each year, Heidi and I get remarried. It's a great party, but for about an hour, we go off on our own down to a private beach. We sit there with the kids and read vows to each other as the sun sets. It's a very special moment to us". In November 2009, Klum officially adopted Seal's surname and became legally known as Heidi Samuel.

On 11 June 2009, Seal, on tour with his new album Soul, revealed, "It is nice to be in newspapers and magazines for something other than my marriage". He said his marriage to Klum may take away the attention, but does not detract from what he loves doing: making music. In February 2011, Klum praised Seal for his good parenting skills, saying, "When I first met Seal he had a kindness and compassion that was so sincere I knew he'd be a good father... He has infinite amounts of love and patience for our kids... He puts me and the children first". Klum also remarked how lucky she was to have a husband like Seal.

In late 2009, Seal officially adopted Klum's daughter and her last name was changed to Samuel. The couple has three other children: two sons, Henry Günther Ademola Dashtu Samuel (born September 2005) and Johan Riley Fyodor Taiwo Samuel (born November 2006), and a daughter named Lou, born in October 2009.

On 22 January 2012, Seal and Klum announced that they were separating after nearly seven years of marriage. Klum filed for divorce from Seal on 6 April 2012. Their divorce was finalized on 14 October 2014.

Since 2021, he has been in a relationship with his former personal assistant Laura Strayer.

=== Health ===
The prominent scarring on Seal's face is the result of a type of lupus called discoid lupus erythematosus, which affects the skin and leaves large scars.

=== Charity work ===
In April 1992, Seal performed with the surviving members of Queen at The Freddie Mercury Tribute Concert held at London's Wembley Stadium five months after Mercury's death. Seal sang the 1986 Queen hit "Who Wants to Live Forever" and joined the rest of the acts for the all-star finale singing "We Are the Champions". Thomas Curtis-Horsfall of Smooth Radio stated Seal's performance of "Who Wants to Live Forever" was "one of the standout moments" from the concert, adding "his spine-tingling rendition of the Queen classic had everyone in the arena close to tears."

On 10 March 2012, Seal shared the stage with Kanye West, Soul Rebels Brass Band and Snoop Dogg at Brad Pitt's Night to Make It Right Foundation New Orleans after-party, hosted by comedian Aziz Ansari. The charity event, hosted by Ellen DeGeneres, raised money to build homes for victims of Hurricane Katrina.

== Other work ==
- Seal was also a judge for the 10th annual Independent Music Awards to support independent artists careers.
- Seal competed on the second season of The Masked Singer as "Leopard", finishing in fourth place.
- Seal collaborated with Claptone on the song "Just A Ghost", released in 2021.
- Seal appeared in the 2022 film Me Time, where he performed at a party with the film's main character Sonny.
- In 2025, Seal was featured in a Mountain Dew commercial for the Super Bowl LIX, singing a parody of his song "Kiss From a Rose".

== Discography ==
Studio albums

- Seal (1991)
- Seal ("Seal II") (1994)
- Human Being (1998)
- Seal IV (2003)
- System (2007)
- Soul (2008)
- Seal 6: Commitment (2010)
- Soul 2 (2011)
- 7 (2015)
- Standards (2017)

== Awards and nominations ==
Award	Year	Nominee(s)	Category	Result	Ref.
APRA Music Awards	1996	"Kiss from a Rose"	Most Performed Foreign Work	Won	
American Music Awards	1996	Himself	Favorite Pop/Rock Male Artist	Nominated	
American Music Awards	1997	Himself	Favorite Pop/Rock Male Artist	Nominated	
BMI London Awards	2002	"Kiss from a Rose"	3 Million Award	Won	
BMI London Awards	2004	"Waiting for You"	Pop Award	Won	
BMI London Awards	2005	"Love's Divine"	Pop Award	Won	
BMI London Awards	2006	"Kiss from a Rose"	4 Million Award	Won	
BMI London Awards	2006	"Crazy"	Pop Award	Won	
BMI London Awards	2021	"Kiss from a Rose"	6 Million Award	Won	
BMI Pop Awards	1993	"Crazy"	Award-Winning Songs	Won	
BMI Pop Awards	1996	"Kiss from a Rose"	Award-Winning Songs	Won	
BMI Pop Awards	1996	"Prayer for the Dying"	Award-Winning Songs	Won	
BMI Pop Awards	2005	"Love's Divine"	Award-Winning Songs	Won	
Billboard Music Video Award	1995	"Kiss from a Rose"	Best Pop/Rock Video of the Year	Nominated	
Blockbuster Entertainment Awards	1995	Himself	Favorite Pop Artist - Male	Nominated	
Brit Awards	1991	"Killer" (with Adamski)	British Single of the Year	Nominated	
Brit Awards	1991	"Crazy"	British Single of the Year	Nominated	
Brit Awards	1992	Himself	British Breakthrough Act	Nominated	
Brit Awards	1992	Himself	British Male Solo Artist	Won	
Brit Awards	1992	Seal	British Album of the Year	Won	
Brit Awards	1992	"Killer" (solo version)	British Video of the Year	Won	
Brit Awards	1995	"Prayer for the Dying"	British Video of the Year	Nominated	
Brit Awards	1995	Himself	British Male Solo Artist	Nominated	
Cash Box Year-End Awards	1994	"Prayer for the Dying"	Top Pop Single	Nominated	
Cash Box Year-End Awards	1995	"Kiss from a Rose"	Top Pop Single	Won	
Cash Box Year-End Awards	1995	Himself	Pop Singles: Top Male Artist	Nominated	
Cash Box Year-End Awards	1995	Himself	Pop Albums: Top Pop/Rock Male Artist	Nominated	
Echo Music Prize	2004	Himself	Best International Male	Nominated	
Echo Music Prize	2005	Himself	Best International Male	Nominated	
Grammy Awards	1992	Himself	Best New Artist	Nominated	
Grammy Awards	1992	"Crazy"	Best Male Pop Vocal Performance	Nominated	
Grammy Awards	1995	"Prayer for the Dying"	Best Male Pop Vocal Performance	Nominated	
Grammy Awards	1995	Seal	Album of the Year	Nominated	
Grammy Awards	1995	Seal	Best Pop Vocal Album	Nominated	
Grammy Awards	1996	"Kiss from a Rose"	Record of the Year	Won	
Grammy Awards	1996	"Kiss from a Rose"	Song of the Year	Won	
Grammy Awards	1996	"Kiss from a Rose"	Best Male Pop Vocal Performance	Won	
Grammy Awards	1998	"Fly Like an Eagle"	Best Male Pop Vocal Performance	Nominated	
Grammy Awards	2005	"Love's Divine"	Best Male Pop Vocal Performance	Nominated	
Grammy Awards	2006	"Walk On By"	Best Male Pop Vocal Performance	Nominated	
Grammy Awards	2008	"Amazing"	Best Male Pop Vocal Performance	Nominated	
Grammy Awards	2010	"If You Don't Know Me by Now"	Best Male Pop Vocal Performance	Nominated	
Grammy Awards	2011	"Imagine"	Best Pop Collaboration with Vocals	Won	
Grammy Awards	2019	Standards	Best Traditional Pop Vocal Album	Nominated	
Hungarian Music Awards	2008	System	Best Foreign Pop Album	Nominated	
Hungarian Music Awards	2009	Soul	Best Foreign Pop Album	Nominated	
International Dance Music Awards	2004	Himself	Best Dance Artist (Solo)	Nominated	
International Dance Music Awards	2008	"Amazing"	Best Pop Dance Track	Nominated	
Ivor Novello Awards	1991	"Killer" (with Adamski)	Most Performed Work	Nominated	
Ivor Novello Awards	1991	"Killer" (with Adamski)	The Best Selling 'A' Side	Nominated	
Ivor Novello Awards	1991	"Killer" (with Adamski)	Best Contemporary Song	Won	
Ivor Novello Awards	1992	"Crazy"	Best Contemporary Song	Won	
Ivor Novello Awards	1992	"Crazy"	International Hit of the Year	Won	
Ivor Novello Awards	1996	"Kiss from a Rose"	International Hit of the Year	Won	
Ivor Novello Awards	1996	"Kiss from a Rose"	Best Song Included in a Film	Nominated	
MTV Europe Music Awards	1994	Himself	Best Male	Nominated	
MTV Europe Music Awards	1995	"Kiss from a Rose"	Best Song	Nominated	
MTV Video Music Awards	1991	"Crazy"	Best New Artist	Nominated	
MTV Video Music Awards	1991	"Crazy"	Breakthrough Video	Nominated	
MTV Video Music Awards	1991	"Crazy"	Best Special Effects	Nominated	
MTV Video Music Awards	1991	"Crazy"	Best Editing	Nominated	
MTV Video Music Awards	1991	"Crazy"	Viewer's Choice — MTV Europe	Nominated	
MTV Video Music Awards	1995	"Kiss from a Rose"	Best Video from a Film	Won	
MTV Video Music Awards	1996	"Don't Cry"	Best Male Video	Nominated	
NRJ Music Awards	2002	Seal and Mylène Farmer	Francophone Duo/Group of the Year	Nominated	
NRJ Music Awards	2004	Himself	International Male Artist of the Year	Nominated	
Žebřík Music Awards	2004	Himself	Best International Male	Nominated	
Žebřík Music Awards	2005	Himself	Best International Male	Nominated	
Žebřík Music Awards	2007	Himself	Best International Male	Nominated	
Žebřík Music Awards	2007	"Amazing"	Best International Song	Nominated	
Žebřík Music Awards	2008	Himself	Best International Male	Nominated	

== See also ==
- Brazilians in the United Kingdom
- List of artists who reached number one in the United States
- List of artists who reached number one on the U.S. Dance Club Songs chart
- List of Billboard number-one dance club songs
- Lists of Billboard number-one singles
- List of British Grammy winners and nominees
