= Riddler in other media =

DC Comics villain

Adaptations of Riddler in other media
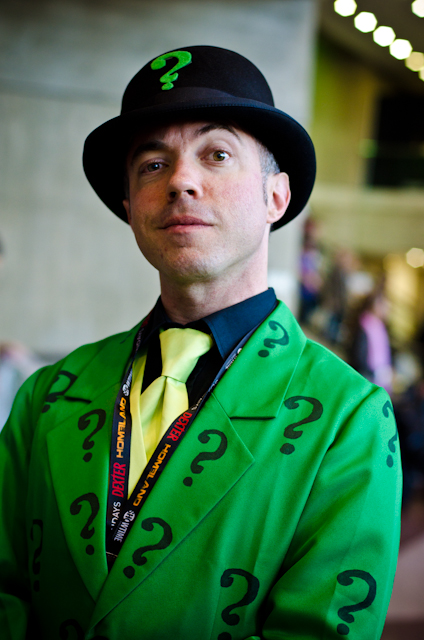
- A cosplayer dressed as the Riddler
- Original source: Comics published by DC Comics
- First appearance: Detective Comics #140 (October 1948)

Films and television
- Film(s): Batman (1966); Batman Forever (1995); The Lego Batman Movie (2017); The Batman (2022)
- Television show(s): Batman (1966); The New Adventures of Batman (1977); Challenge of the Superfriends (1978); Legends of the Superheroes (1979); Super Friends (1980); Batman: The Animated Series (1994); The New Batman Adventures (1997); Superman: The Animated Series (1998); Batman Beyond (1999); The Batman (2004); Batman: The Brave and the Bold (2008); Young Justice (2010); DC Nation Shorts (2011); Gotham (2014); DC Super Hero Girls (2015); Justice League Action (2016); Harley Quinn (2019); Batwheels (2022)

The Riddler, a supervillain in DC Comics and an adversary of the superhero Batman, has been adapted into numerous forms of media, including feature films, television series, and video games. The character has been portrayed in live-action by Frank Gorshin and John Astin in the 1960s television series Batman, Jim Carrey in the 1995 film Batman Forever, Cory Michael Smith in the 2014 Fox series Gotham, and Paul Dano in the 2022 film The Batman. Actors who have voiced the Riddler include John Glover in the DC Animated Universe, Robert Englund in The Batman, and Wally Wingert in the Batman: Arkham video games.

== Television ==
=== Live-action ===
The Riddler, portrayed by Frank Gorshin in the 1960s Batman TV series (left) and Cory Michael Smith on the TV series Gotham (right)
- The Riddler appears in Batman (1966), portrayed by Frank Gorshin in the first and third seasons and John Astin in the second season. This version was inspired by the Riddler's first Silver Age appearance, with the premiere episode being an adaptation of Batman #171. Gorshin would be nominated for an Emmy Award for his performance, which elevated the character's popularity and turned him into a major member of Batman's rogues gallery.
- The Riddler appears in Legends of the Superheroes, portrayed again by Frank Gorshin. This version is a member of the Legion of Doom.
- A young Edward Nygma appears in Gotham, portrayed by Cory Michael Smith. This version is a forensic scientist working for the Gotham City Police Department who has a fondness for expressing his findings in the form of riddles before eventually turning to crime and terrorizing Gotham as the Riddler. The series traces his evolution into a master criminal as well as his complicated, love–hate relationship with fellow criminal Oswald Cobblepot.

=== Animation ===
The Riddler as he appears in Challenge of the Superfriends

The Riddler as he appears in The Batman (2004)

- The Riddler appears in The Batman/Superman Hour, voiced by Ted Knight.
- The Riddler appears in the opening of The New Adventures of Batman, sporting a red costume instead of the traditional green.
- The Riddler appears in Challenge of the Superfriends, voiced by Michael Bell. This version is a member of the Legion of Doom.
- The Riddler appears in Super Friends, voiced again by Michael Bell.
- The Riddler appears in The Batman (2004), voiced by Robert Englund. This version sports a Gothic appearance and is served by henchmen called Riddlemen. In the past, he and his partner Julie (voiced by Brooke Shields) worked on a device capable of enhancing the human brain when he was approached by a businessman named Chuck Gorman (voiced by Bob Gunton), who wanted to purchase the rights to the device, though Nygma refused. When the device malfunctioned at a demonstration, Nygma accused Gorman of sabotaging it and attempted to kill him, only to be foiled by Batman. In the present, Nygma becomes the Riddler to make another attempt on Gorman's life, only to learn that Gorman is innocent and it was Julie who sabotaged their device out of greed.
- The Riddler appears in Batman: The Brave and the Bold, voiced by John Michael Higgins. In his most notable appearance in the episode "The Criss Cross Conspiracy!", he is targeted by Batwoman, whom he had publicly unmasked and humiliated ten years prior.
- The Riddler appears in Robot Chicken, voiced initially by Patrick Warburton and later by Paul Reubens. This version is a member of the Legion of Doom.
- The Riddler appears in Young Justice, voiced by Dave Franco. This version is a member of the Light.
- The Riddler appears in the DC Nation Shorts segment "Riddle Me This!", voiced by "Weird Al" Yankovic.
- The Riddler makes cameo appearances in Teen Titans Go! (2013).
- The Riddler appears in DC Super Friends, voiced by Steve Staley.
- The Riddler appears in the Justice League Action episode "E. Nygma, Consulting Detective", voiced by Brent Spiner. This version is a detective, reformed criminal, and rival of the Joker who sports a shaved head.
- The Riddler appears in DC Super Hero Girls (2019), voiced by David Hornsby.
- The Riddler appears in Harley Quinn, voiced by Jim Rash. This version is a member of the Legion of Doom in the first season and the Injustice League in the second season. Additionally, he takes on a muscular physique after being captured by Harley Quinn's crew and being forced to power their mall lair in the latter season. As of the third season, he has returned to his slim physique and entered a relationship with the Clock King. In "Harley Quinn: A Very Problematic Valentine's Day Special", the Riddler proposes to Clock King and the pair get engaged.
  - The Riddler appears in Kite Man: Hell Yeah!, voiced again by Rash.
- The Riddler appears in Batwheels, voiced by SungWon Cho.
- The Riddler appears in Batman: Caped Crusader, voiced by Ronan Raftery. This version is an impulsive, borderline psychotic gangster who works for Rupert Thorne and gained the "Riddler" nickname for riddling his targets with bullets. After Thorne's disappearance, the Riddler takes over Thorne's operations until he is killed by Thorn, whose father he killed.

==== DC Animated Universe ====
The Riddler as he appeared in Batman: The Animated Series (left) and The New Batman Adventures (right)

Edward Nygma / Riddler appears in series set in the DC Animated Universe (DCAU), voiced by John Glover. To avoid confusion with the Joker, the producers of Batman: The Animated Series chose not to portray this version as Frank Gorshin's cackling trickster from Batman (1966); instead portraying the Riddler as a smooth intellectual who presents genuinely challenging puzzles and dresses in a sedated version of Gorshin's preferred costume for the character. The series creators also admitted they did not use him often because his character made story plots too long, complex, or bizarre, and they found it difficult to devise the villain's riddles.

- The Riddler first appears in Batman: The Animated Series (1992), with his design consisting of a green suit, purple mask, and a staff that lacks the usual question mark-shaped design. Introduced in the episode "If You're So Smart, Why Aren't You Rich?", Nygma was originally a video game developer before being unjustly fired by his greedy boss, Daniel Mockridge, who stole his ideas.
- The Riddler makes minor appearances in The New Batman Adventures, now sporting a unitard with a large question mark and no hair and mask.
- The Riddler makes a minor appearance in the Superman: The Animated Series episode "Knight Time".
- An android drone of the Riddler makes a non-speaking cameo appearance in the Batman Beyond episode "Terry's Friend Dates a Robot".
- The Riddler was originally planned to appear in the third season of Justice League Unlimited as a member of Gorilla Grodd's Secret Society as a tribute to his appearance in Challenge of the Superfriends (see above). However, due to rights issues caused by the "Bat-embargo", the plan was scrapped.

== Film ==
=== Live-action ===
Jim Carrey as Edward Nygma / The Riddler in Batman Forever (1995)

Paul Dano as Edward Nashton / The Riddler in The Batman (2022)

- The Batman (1966) incarnation of the Riddler appears in the self-titled film adaptation, portrayed again by Frank Gorshin.
- Edward Nygma / Riddler appears in Batman Forever, portrayed by Jim Carrey. This version is an eccentric, amoral Wayne Enterprises inventor who designs "The Box", a device seemingly capable of projecting images into a person's mind while transferring neural energy into others to enhance their intellects. After Bruce Wayne rejects his invention due to ethical and safety concerns, Nygma becomes the Riddler to prove his superiority to him by obsessively sending him puzzles to solve. Nygma later allies with Two-Face and goes on a crime spree to fund his own company, NygmaTech, mass-produce the Box's technology, and market it as a means of enhancing how viewers watch television; allowing him to absorb all of Gotham City's citizens' intelligence and deduce that Bruce Wayne is Batman. Ultimately, Batman shatters the master box, which overloads the information flow into Riddler's brain, damaging the latter's mind before he is incarcerated at Arkham Asylum, thinking he is Batman.
- Edward Nashton / Riddler appears in The Batman (2022), portrayed by Paul Dano. This version is a masked serial killer, partly based on the real-life Zodiac Killer, who seeks to "unmask the truth" about Gotham City's upper class while leaving cryptic messages for Batman, and wears military cold weather gear. Nashton grew up in Thomas Wayne's orphanage, which was underfunded after corruption siphoned off its endowment, holds a grudge against Bruce Wayne for his privileged childhood, and ironically sees Batman as a kindred spirit. After killing three corrupt city officials and crime boss Carmine Falcone, Nashton allows himself to be captured and sent to Arkham Hospital so that Batman can discover his ultimate plan: bombing Gotham's breakwaters and flooding it while his online followers carry out a massacre at the opposing mayoral candidate's election night rally, which Batman and Catwoman narrowly thwart. Later, in Arkham, Nashton befriends his mysterious cellmate.

=== Animation ===
- The Riddler makes a cameo appearance in Batman: Under the Red Hood, voiced by Bruce Timm.
- The Riddler appears in Lego Batman: The Movie - DC Super Heroes Unite, voiced by Rob Paulsen.
- The Riddler appears in Batman: Assault on Arkham, voiced by Matthew Gray Gubler. This version is a former member of the Suicide Squad who discovered how to disarm the nano-bombs that the squad's handler, Amanda Waller, implants into the group's members to keep them in line.
- The Batman (1966) incarnation of the Riddler appears in Batman: Return of the Caped Crusaders and Batman vs. Two-Face, voiced again by Wally Wingert.
- The Riddler appears in The Lego Batman Movie, voiced by Conan O'Brien.
- The Batman: The Brave and the Bold incarnation of the Riddler appears in Scooby-Doo! & Batman: The Brave and the Bold, voiced again by John Michael Higgins. It is revealed that he is a former assistant of Professor Milo and seeks to revive a dimensional portal project he was involved in.
- Edward Nygma appears in Batman: Hush, voiced by Geoffrey Arend. Similarly to the comics, this version deduces Batman's identity as Bruce Wayne while using a Lazarus Pit to cure his brain tumor. However, Nygma goes on to use the alternate alter-ego Hush to manipulate other supervillains into destroying Batman on multiple fronts while using Clayface to assume his Riddler identity to maintain appearances. Ultimately, Nygma's plans are foiled and he is killed by Catwoman.
- The Riddler appears in Lego DC Batman: Family Matters, voiced by André Sogliuzzo.
- The Riddler makes a non-speaking cameo appearance in Batman: Death in the Family.
- The Riddler makes a minor non-speaking appearance in Injustice.
- The Riddler appears in Teen Titans Go! & DC Super Hero Girls: Mayhem in the Multiverse. This version is a member of the Legion of Doom.
- The Riddler makes a non-speaking cameo appearance in Merry Little Batman.
- The Riddler appears in Batman: Knightfall, voiced by David Dastmalchian.

== Video games ==
The Riddler as he appears in Batman: The Enemy Within

- The Riddler appears as a boss in Batman: The Animated Series (1993).
- The Riddler appears as a boss in The Adventures of Batman & Robin, voiced again by John Glover.
- The Riddler, based on Jim Carrey's portrayal, appears as a boss in the Batman Forever film tie-in game.
- The Riddler appears in DC Universe Online, voiced by Shannon McCormick. This version is a detective.
- The Riddler appears in Minecraft via the "Batman" DLC.
- The Riddler appears as a non-player character (NPC) in Injustice: Gods Among Us via the Arkham Asylum stage.
- The Riddler appears as a boss in Young Justice: Legacy, voiced by Jason Spisak.
- The Riddler appears in Batman: The Enemy Within, voiced by Robin Atkin Downes. This version is 60 years old; known as "Gotham's original costumed criminal", having operated years prior while the city was controlled by Thomas Wayne and Carmine Falcone; a former employee of the Agency's scientific division SANCTUS; and a skilled hand-to-hand combatant and practitioner of Bartitsu, which he uses in conjunction with his cane. Additionally, he was a test subject in the Agency's experiments with the "LOTUS virus", a bioweapon that allowed him to maintain his youth, but drove him insane. After disappearing for several years, he resurfaces as the leader of a criminal group called the Pact to steal the LOTUS virus as well as pursue personal revenge against the Agency and target Batman. In the midst of his attacks, Lucius Fox is inadvertently killed by a missile strike on Wayne Enterprises. Batman eventually defeats the Riddler, who is assassinated by Lucius' daughter Tiffany. The Pact and Amanda Waller use the Riddler's body to create their own versions of the LOTUS virus, but their samples are destroyed by Agent Iman Avesta.

=== Batman: Arkham ===
Concept artwork of the Riddler for Batman: Arkham City

Edward Nashton / Enigma / Riddler appears in the Batman: Arkham video game series, voiced by Wally Wingert. This version had an abusive father who accused him of cheating in a riddle solving contest before beating him. This resulted in Nashton becoming obsessed with riddles and proving his intellectual superiority. He would later go on to become a police consultant and the apparent head of the Gotham City Police Department (GCPD)'s Cybercrime unit, during which he operated as Enigma before eventually becoming the Riddler.

- While the Riddler does not physically appear in Batman: Arkham Asylum (2009), he hacks into Batman's communication system and challenges him to solve riddles, most of which involve collecting trophies in hard-to-reach locations. Upon completing all of the Riddler's challenges, Batman triangulates the former's location in Gotham City and has him arrested by the GCPD.
- The Riddler makes his first physical appearance in the sequel Batman: Arkham City (2011). He, along with many of Gotham City's criminals and supervillains, was captured and sent to Professor Hugo Strange's Arkham City, a lawless, walled city whose inhabitants are free to wreak havoc. The Riddler kidnaps former Arkham guard Aaron Cash's medical protection team, places them in death traps, and threatens to murder them to force Batman to solve his riddles and challenges, which he has scattered throughout Arkham City. Additionally, the Riddler employs moles embedded in the Joker, Penguin, and Two-Face's gangs. After Batman eventually outwits the death traps and rescues some of the hostages, Oracle discerns the location of the Riddler's hideout, where Batman rescues the remaining hostages and subdues the Riddler.
- A young Nashton, as Enigma, appears in the prequel Batman: Arkham Origins (2013). He establishes a series of signal jammers throughout Gotham City to disrupt Batman's Batwing and hacking transmitter as part of a plot to blackmail Gotham's most prominent citizens and rid it of the corrupt despite putting innocent lives at risk. To further his plot, Nashton also has informants and pieces of extortion recordings scattered throughout Gotham. After uncovering and decoding the recordings and destroying the jammers Batman finds Enigma's hideout, which he has already abandoned leaving behind a prototype trophy.
- In Batman: Arkham Knight (2015), the Riddler allies with the Scarecrow and Arkham Knight to kill Batman, builds robotic assistants, establishes more challenges for Batman, and coerces him into completing them by taking Catwoman hostage via an explosive collar. As he completes the challenges, Batman locates the keys needed to remove her collar before the pair confront the Riddler in a "Riddler Mech" and his army of robots. After defeating him, Batman takes the Riddler to GCPD headquarters. In the "Catwoman's Revenge" DLC, set after the events of the main game, Catwoman infiltrates the Riddler's lair while he is incarcerated and transfers his money from his account to hers before leaving his lair to self-destruct.
- The Riddler appears as an unlockable playable character in the mobile game Batman: Arkham Underworld. For this game, he wields a sawed-off shotgun along with his cane, which he can use to electrocute enemies, create holograms, and sabotage electronic devices. He can also summon two of his robotic minions for assistance.
- The Riddler appears in Batman: Arkham VR.
- The Riddler appears in Suicide Squad: Kill the Justice League. Amidst Brainiac's invasion of Metropolis, the Riddler hacks into the Suicide Squad's neck bombs and demands they solve his riddles and complete his challenges as revenge against Amanda Waller for selecting perceived inferior villains over him.
- The Riddler makes a vocal cameo in a post credit scene of Batman: Arkham Shadow.

=== Lego Batman ===
- The Riddler appears in Lego Batman: The Videogame, voiced by Tom Kenny. This version's cane grants him limited mind-manipulating abilities.
- The Riddler appears as a boss, optional boss, and unlockable playable character in Lego Batman 2: DC Super Heroes, voiced by Rob Paulsen.
- The Riddler appears as a playable character and boss in Lego Batman 3: Beyond Gotham, voiced by Roger Craig Smith. Additionally, the Batman (1966) incarnation of the Riddler appears as an alternate skin.
- The Riddler appears in Lego Dimensions, voiced again by Roger Craig Smith.
- The Riddler appears as a playable character in Lego DC Super-Villains, voiced again by Wally Wingert.
- The Riddler appears in Lego Batman: Legacy of the Dark Knight, voiced by Matthew Curtis.

== Merchandise ==
- The Riddler received several figures in the Mego Corporation's "World's Greatest Superheroes" and "Bend 'n Flex" lines.
- The Riddler received several figures in Kenner's Batman: The Animated Series, "Legends of Batman", and "Batman: Knight Force Ninjas" toy lines.
- The Riddler received a figure in Mattel's The Batman (2004) and DC Universe toy lines.
- The Riddler received a figure in Art Asylum's Minimates line.
- The Riddler received a figure in the HeroClix line.
- The Riddler received several figures in the Batman Forever tie-in toy line.
- The Riddler received a figure in Pacipa's "Super Amigos" line, the Argentinan version of Kenner's Super Powers Collection.
- The Riddler received a figure in Toy Biz's "DC Comics SuperHeroes" line.
- The Riddler received several figures in the DC Direct line.
- The Riddler received a figure from Japanese toy company Yamato.
- The Riddler received a San Diego ComicCon (2013)-exclusive figure from Bearbrick and MediCom Toy Inc.

== Music ==
- The Batman (1966) incarnation of the Riddler gets a self-titled song, written and sung by Frank Gorshin that was performed on The Dean Martin Show.
- The Riddler serves as inspiration for a self-titled instrumental song, which was included in The Marketts' album The Batman Theme.
- The Riddler appears in the music video for Nik Kershaw's song "The Riddle".
- The Riddler, based on Jim Carrey's portrayal, serves as inspiration for a self-titled song performed by Method Man and featured on the Batman Forever soundtrack.
- The Riddler serves as inspiration for a self-titled song recorded by Nightwish as part of their album Oceanborn.
- The Riddler serves as inspiration for the final movement of "The Rogues' Gallery", written by Mohammed Fairouz.

== Attractions ==
- The Riddler serves as inspiration for The Riddler's Revenge, located in Six Flags Magic Mountain in Valencia, California.
- The Riddler serves as inspiration for The Riddler Revenge, located at Six Flags Over Texas in Arlington, Texas.
- The Riddler serves as inspiration for The Riddler Mindbender, located at Six Flags Over Georgia in Atlanta, Georgia.
- The Riddler serves as inspiration for La Venganza del Enigma ("The Riddler's Revenge"), located at Parque Warner Madrid in Madrid, Spain.
- The Riddler serves as inspiration for Riddle Me This, located at Six Flags America.

== Miscellaneous ==
- The Batman (1966) incarnation of the Riddler appears in an Interview with the Vampire-inspired short film for The MTV Movie Awards, portrayed again by Frank Gorshin.
- The DC Animated Universe (DCAU) incarnation of the Riddler appears in The Batman Adventures. He attempts to reform, but struggles to do so. To help him, Batman recruits the Riddler to answer the riddle of how the Penguin became Gotham's mayor. However, the Clock King beats the Riddler into a coma. While the comic was cancelled before the latter's fate could be resolved, the writers planned to have him come out of his coma with amnesia and attempt to uncover his identity.
- The DCAU incarnation of the Riddler appears in The Batman and Robin Adventures, with his first appearance seeing him being assisted by Query and Echo.
- The DCAU incarnation of the Riddler appears in Batman: Gotham Adventures.
- The Batman Forever incarnation of the character makes a cameo in the adult novelization for Batman & Robin. He appears briefly in a scene where Poison Ivy is being escorted towards Mr. Freeze's cell in Arkham Asylum. He shows anger at someone else trying to ask Poison Ivy a riddle.
- The Riddler has had a dedicated page on Wikipedia since 2003. In 2013, a hoax would name "Patrick Parker" as an alias of the Riddler, which (through citogenesis) would be canonized with their inclusion in The Batman (2022) and The Riddler: Year One (2022).
- A character based on the Riddler called Kwiz Kid appears in Teen Titans Go! (2004) #15.
- The Riddler appears in StarKid Productions' production of Holy Musical B@man!, played by Meredith Stepien.
- The Riddler appears in the Badman web series episode "Batman Meets the Riddler".
- The Riddler appears in the Injustice: Gods Among Us prequel comic as a patient of Arkham Asylum.
- The Riddler appears in DC Super Hero Girls (2015), voiced by Yuri Lowenthal. This version is a student at Super Hero High.
- The Riddler appears in the Spotify podcasts Batman Unburied and The Riddler: Secrets in the Dark, voiced by Hasan Minhaj.
- The Riddler appears in Batman: The Audio Adventures, voiced by John Leguizamo.
- Two characters based on the Riddler appear in published material set in the continuity of Batman (1989) and Batman Returns.
  - The first is Norman Pinkus, who uses the pseudonym Edward Nygma and appears briefly in Batman: Resurrection before appearing in Batman: Revolution.
  - The second is Edward Nigel Maynard, an inmate of Arkham Asylum who idolizes Pinkus and appears briefly in Revolution before appearing in Batman '89: Echoes.
- The Riddler appears in the State Farm ad "Batman vs. Bateman”, portrayed by Josh Meyer.
