= Patience of Angels =

Single by Eddi Reader

from the album Eddi Reader
- Released: 20 June 1994
- Recorded: 1994
- Genre: Folk; pop
- Length: 4:06 (radio mix)
- Label: Warner Music Group
- Songwriter(s): Boo Hewerdine
- Producer(s): Greg Penny

Eddi Reader singles chronology
"Patience of Angels" (1994)	"Joke (I'm Laughing)" (1994)

"Patience of Angels" is the first single by Scottish singer/songwriter Eddi Reader released from her eponymous second album (1994). The song was written by Boo Hewerdine and produced by Greg Penny. It was released in June 1994 by Warner Music Group and peaked at number 33 on the UK Singles Chart.

== Critical reception ==
Chuck Campbell from Knoxville News Sentinel wrote, "On the lilting and vibrant 'Patience of Angels', she sings about a displaced soul searching for meaning in life amid feelings of anonymity (bottom line: most of us feel this way)." Music & Media noted, "Constant craving for the right sound has driven chanteuse Reader into the arms of Greg Penny, the man behind k.d. lang's grammy-awarded Ingenue album." DJ Graham Dene on Virgin 1215 AM/London agreed on it being a very wise choice, saying, "For me it's the best new record of the moment. I screamed 'yes' when I first heard it. Written by Boo "Who?" Hewerdine, who used to be with the Bible, it made an immediate impact on me."

== Music video ==
The promotional video features Reader singing on the top deck of a bus.

== Charts ==
Chart (1994)	Peak position
UK Singles (OCC)	33
UK Airplay (Music Week)	15
