= Eddi Reader (album) =

Studio album by Eddi Reader
- Released: UK: 20 June 1994; Japan: 25 July 1994; US: 13 September 1994
- Studio: El Mirador, Ojai, California
- Genre: Folk-pop
- Length: 49:43
- Label: Blanco y Negro
- Producer: Greg Penny

Eddi Reader chronology
| Mirmama (1992) | Eddi Reader (1994) | Candyfloss and Medicine (1996) |

Singles from Eddi Reader
- 1. "Patience of Angels" Released: June 1994; 2. "Joke (I'm Laughing)" Released: August 1994; 3. "Dear John" Released: November 1994

Professional ratings
Review scores
| Source | Rating |
|---|---|
| AllMusic | 4.5/5 stars |
| Knoxville News Sentinel | 4/5 stars |

Eddi Reader is the second studio album by the Scottish singer Eddi Reader released in the United Kingdom on 20 June 1994 by Blanco y Negro Records.

The album was recorded in America with producer Greg Penny (k.d. lang's producer on Ingénue), and was the first to feature songs written and co-written with future regular cohort Boo Hewerdine. It also featured four songs written by ex Fairground Attraction member Mark Nevin.

With major label backing and extensive radio & MTV-play for the single "Patience of Angels" it is Reader's most successful chart album to date, going Top 40 in the UK in its first week of release.

On the strength of this success, Reader received the Brit Award for British Female Solo Artist the following year.

Two additional singles were released: "Joke (I'm Laughing)" and "Dear John". The latter was co-written by Kirsty MacColl and originally intended for her 1993 album Titanic Days. However MacColl was going through a divorce at the time and felt the song was too painful to release and offered the track to Reader. It would later resurface as a demo recording on the 2005 re-released Titanic Days. Reader has worked with Kirsty's half brothers Neill and Calum MacColl.

== Track listing ==
| No. | Title | Writer(s) | Length |
|---|---|---|---|
| 1. | "The Right Place" | Mark Nevin | 4:54 |
| 2. | "Patience of Angels" | Boo Hewerdine | 4:06 |
| 3. | "Dear John" | Nevin, Kirsty MacColl | 4:10 |
| 4. | "Scarecrow" | Eddi Reader, Hewerdine, Gary Clark | 3:34 |
| 5. | "East of Us" | Reader, Teddy Borowiecki | 4:34 |
| 6. | "Joke (I'm Laughing)" | Hewerdine | 3:48 |
| 7. | "The Exception" | Nevin | 4:28 |
| 8. | "Red Face Big Sky" | Reader, Borowiecki | 4:11 |
| 9. | "Howling in Ojai" | Reader, David Piltch, Dean Parks | 1:29 |
| 10. | "When I Watch You Sleeping" | Nevin | 4:40 |
| 11. | "Wonderful Lie" | Reader, Hewerdine | 4:34 |
| 12. | "Siren" | Reader, Borowiecki, Hewerdine | 5:13 |

== Personnel ==
- Eddi Reader – vocals, backing vocals, tambourine
- Teddy Borowiecki – keyboards, accordion, guitar
- Dean Parks – guitars, guitar percussion
- David Piltch – bass
- Curt Bisquera – drums, percussion
- Roy Dodds – drums
- Mark E. Nevin – guitars
- Greg Penny – percussion
- John Ingoldsby – backing vocals
- Katia Lempkowicz – backing vocals

== Charts ==
| Chart | Peak position |
|---|---|
| UK Album Chart | 4 |

== Certifications ==
Certifications for Eddi Reader
| Region | Certification | Certified units/sales |
|---|---|---|
| United Kingdom (BPI) | Gold | 100,000^{^} |
^{^} Shipments figures based on certification alone.
