= Joke (I'm Laughing) =

Single by Eddi Reader

from the album Eddi Reader
- B-side: "Saturday Night"
- Released: 1 August 1994
- Length: 3:52
- Label: Blanco y Negro
- Songwriter(s): Boo Hewerdine
- Producer(s): Greg Penny

Eddi Reader singles chronology
"Patience of Angels" (1994)	"Joke (I'm Laughing)" (1994)	"Dear John" (1994)

"Joke (I'm Laughing)" is a song by Scottish singer-songwriter Eddi Reader, released on 1 August 1994 by Blanco y Negro Records as the second single from her second studio album, Eddi Reader (1994). It was written by Boo Hewerdine and produced by Greg Penny. "Joke (I'm Laughing)" reached No. 42 on the UK Singles Chart and remained in the Top 100 for three weeks.

In 1996, Hewerdine released his own version of the song as a single from his album Baptist Hospital. Speaking to Folk Radio in 2014, Hewerdine said of the song: ""Joke" was the first song I made up that I thought was good. I wrote it for my post-school band Placebo Thing."

== Critical reception ==
Upon its release as a single, Andrew Mueller of Melody Maker remarked, "There is something intangible about Ms Reader's new single that makes me think that I will hear it in a dark, dusty, deserted wine bar somewhere in the former Soviet Union in about three years time and get annoyed because I can't remember who sang it." In a review of Eddi Reader, Ira Robbins of Trouser Press described the song as "sardonic" which "seethes with quiet disdain". Jon Pareles of The New York Times observed that "love doesn't go smoothly in Ms. Reader's songs" and noted "Joke (I'm Laughing)" for its narrative of a "spurned woman".

== Track listing ==
- 7" and cassette single
1. "Joke (I'm Laughing)" - 3:52
2. "Saturday Night" - 4:58
- CD single
1. "Joke (I'm Laughing)" - 3:52
2. "Saturday Night" - 4:58
3. "Wonderboy" - 2:39
- CD single (UK limited edition)
1. "Joke (I'm Laughing)" - 3:52
2. "Three Crosses" - 4:16
3. "Go and Sit Upon the Grass" - 1:27

== Personnel ==
Joke (I'm Laughing)

- Eddi Reader – vocals, backing vocals
- Dean Parks – guitar
- Teddy Borowecki – piano, keyboards
- David Piltch – bass
- Greg Penny – drums

Production

- Greg Penny – producer of "Joke (I'm Laughing)" and "Wonderboy"
- Jon Ingoldsby – mixing and recording on "Joke (I'm Laughing)"
- Andy Strange, Steve Holroyd – assistant engineers on "Joke (I'm Laughing)"
- Ron Johnson – technical assistance on "Joke (I'm Laughing)"
- Chris Bellman – mastering on "Joke (I'm Laughing)"
- Eddi Reader, Teddy Borowiecki – producers of "Saturday Night", "Three Crosses" and "Go and Sit Upon the Grass"

Other

- Kevin Westenberg – photography
- M at Maitland – sleeve design

== Charts ==
Chart (1994)	Peak position
UK Singles (OCC)	42
UK Airplay (Music Week)	28
