= Dear John (Eddi Reader song) =

Single by Eddi Reader

from the album Eddi Reader
- B-side: "Battersea Moon"
- Released: 24 October 1994
- Length: 4:08
- Label: Blanco y Negro
- Songwriter(s): Kirsty MacColl; Mark E. Nevin
- Producer(s): Greg Penny

Eddi Reader singles chronology
"Joke (I'm Laughing)" (1994)	"Dear John" (1994)	"Nobody Lives Without Love" (1995)

"Dear John" is a song by Scottish singer-songwriter Eddi Reader, released on 24 October 1994 by Blanco y Negro Records as the third and final single from her second studio album, Eddi Reader (1994). It was written by Kirsty MacColl and Mark E. Nevin, and produced by Greg Penny. "Dear John" reached No. 48 in the UK and remained in the charts for two weeks. In 1995, the song was nominated for "Best song musically and lyrically" at the Ivor Novello Awards.

== Background ==
"Dear John" was inspired by the end of MacColl's ten year marriage to Steve Lillywhite. It was originally intended for inclusion on her 1993 album Titanic Days, however she considered it too emotional and personal, and offered it to Reader instead. MacColl's demo version, which was recorded at Nevin's house, would later surface on the 2005 compilation From Croydon to Cuba: An Anthology.

Nevin said of the song in the 2001 BBC documentary The Life and Songs of Kirsty MacColl: "It was really Kirsty admitting violently that her marriage was over. I remember when she first sung me the lyrics, I put my arms around her and she cried, and I cried because I knew it was the end." He told Ian Peel of Record Collector: ""Dear John" was literally Kirsty's Dear John note to her husband, Steve, and just too close to the bone. You can hear how emotional Kirsty was when she was singing it [on the demo version]. We ended up giving the song to Eddi Reader." Reader told Insight in 2019 that performing "Dear John" live "can be difficult". She added: "It was written by people in the misery of divorce then sung at the time by me, in the misery of that too!"

== Reception ==
In a review of Eddi Reader, Jan Moir of The Guardian described the song as a "big ballad" and considered it the best track on the album. Rick Anderson of AllMusic felt "Dear John" was "perhaps the tenderest kiss-off song ever written".

== Music video ==
The accompanying music video for "Dear John" was directed by Angela Conway and produced by Richard Bell for State. It was released in early November 1994 and features a striking performance shot in London's Hoxton Hall.

== Track listing ==
- 7" single
1. "Dear John" - 4:08
2. "Battersea Moon" (Jay's Edit) - 4:12
- CD single
1. "Dear John" - 4:08
2. "When I Watch You Sleeping" (Demo Version) - 3:53
3. "What You Do With What You've Got" - 4:37
4. "That's Fair" - 4:44

== Personnel ==
- Eddi Reader - vocals
- Mark E. Nevin - guitar
- David Piltch - bass
- Roy Dodds - drums

Production

- Greg Penny - producer
- John Ingoldsby - engineer, mixing
- Andy Strange, Steve Holroyd - assistant engineers
- Chris Bellman - mastering
- Thomas Dolby - remix of "What You Do With What You've Got"
- Eddi Reader, Kevin Moloney, Roy Dodds - producers of "What You Do With What You've Got"
- The Patron Saints of Imperfection - producers of "That's Fair"

Other

- Kevin Westenberg - photography

== Charts ==
Chart (1994)	Peak position
UK Singles (OCC)	48
