= Newborn Friend =

1994 single by Seal

Single by Seal

from the album Seal
- Released: 24 October 1994
- Length: 4:05
- Label: ZTT; Sire
- Songwriter: Seal
- Producer: Trevor Horn

Seal singles chronology
"Kiss from a Rose" (1994)	"Newborn Friend" (1994)	"I'm Alive" (1995)

Music video
- "Newborn Friend" on YouTube

"Newborn Friend" is a song by British singer-songwriter Seal, released in October 1994 by ZTT and Sire Records as the third single from his second studio album, Seal (also known as Seal II) (1994). The song was written by Seal and produced by Trevor Horn. It peaked at number 45 on the UK Singles Chart, while reaching number two on the US Billboard Dance Club Play chart. The accompanying music video was directed by English musician and music video director Lol Creme.

== Critical reception ==
Larry Flick from Billboard magazine wrote, "From the opening line, I wash my faith in dirty water, you know that this follow-up to the recent hit 'Prayer for the Dying' is not going to be a typical top 40 ditty. However, the assistance of producer Trevor Horn's savvy ear for lush instrumentation and groove, and Seal's knack for crafting tight and catchy hooks, keep the track from getting too dark and maudlin. In fact, the arrangement builds to a musical conclusion that is positively bright and toe-tapping." Another Billboard editor, Melinda Newman, noted, "With its strong rhythmic pulse, the escapist beat of 'Newborn Friend' belies the inner conflicts the lyrics portray." Dele Fadele from NME commented, "'Newborn Friend' visits Phil Collins' Spanish villa, with all manner of studio trickery by Trevor Horn. That is: a complex bundle of nothingness that is unlikely to gain airplay even on Virgin FM."

== Track listings ==
- UK and Germany CD (1994) (ZANG58CD)
1. "Newborn Friend" (The Silver Mix) – 4:06
2. "Newborn Friend" (Morales Radio Mix) – 3:54
3. "Newborn Friend" (Brothers in Rhythm Club Mix) – 8:42
4. "Newborn Friend" (Morales Club Mix) – 9:10
5. "Newborn Friend" (Mo-Mo's Bass Mix) – 6:00
6. "Newborn Friend" (Friend for Life) – 9:02
- UK remixes CD (1994) (ZANG58CD2)
1. "Newborn Friend" (Morales Club Mix II) – 9:09
2. "Newborn Friend" (Morales Dub II) – 7:27
3. "Newborn Friend" ((Tasty) Tom Elmhirst Mix) – 10:48
- UK 12-inch (1994) (ZANG58T)
1. "Newborn Friend" (Morales Club Mix) – 9:10
2. "Newborn Friend" (Morales Dub) – 7:26
3. "Newborn Friend" (Brothers in Rhythm Club Mix) – 8:42
4. "Newborn Friend" (Friend for Life) – 9:02
- UK 12-inch (1994) (SAM 1448)
1. "Newborn Friend" (Morales Club Mix) – 9:10
2. "Newborn Friend" (Morales Dub) – 7:26
3. "Newborn Friend" (Morales Radio Mix) – 3:54
4. "Newborn Friend" (Mo-Mo's Bass Mix) – 6:00
- US CD (1994) (2-18053)
1. "Newborn Friend" (The Silver Mix) – 4:06
2. "Blues In 'E'" – 3:43
- US CD (1994) (9 41764-2)
1. "Newborn Friend" (The Silver Mix) – 4:06
2. "Newborn Friend" (Morales Club Mix) – 9:10
3. "The Wind Cries Mary" – 3:54
4. "Newborn Friend" (Brothers in Rhythm Club Mix) – 8:42
5. "Newborn Friend" (Friend for Life) – 9:02
6. "Blues In 'E'" – 3:43
7. "Newborn Friend" (Mo-Mo's Bass Mix) – 6:00
8. "Newborn Friend" (Morales Radio Mix) – 3:54
- US 12-inch (1994) (0-41764)
1. "Newborn Friend" (Morales Club Mix) – 9:10
2. "Newborn Friend" (Morales Dub) – 7:26
3. "Newborn Friend" (Brothers in Rhythm Club Mix) – 8:42
4. "Newborn Friend" (Friend for Life) – 9:02

== Charts ==
=== Weekly charts ===
Weekly chart performance for "Newborn Friend"
Chart (1994–1995)	Peak position
Canada Top Singles (RPM)	6
Europe (European Dance Radio)	16
Europe (European Hit Radio)	22
Iceland (Íslenski Listinn Topp 40)	8
New Zealand (Recorded Music NZ)	24
UK Singles (Official Charts)	45
UK Airplay (Music Week)	18
UK Club Chart (Music Week)	12
US Bubbling Under Hot 100 (Billboard)	9
US Dance Club Songs (Billboard)	2

=== Year-end charts ===
Year-end chart performance for "Newborn Friend"
Chart (1995)	Position
Canada Top Singles (RPM)	58
