= Nobody Lives Without Love =

Single by Eddi Reader

from the album Batman Forever
- Released: 1995
- Length: 5:05
- Label: Blanco y Negro
- Songwriters: Tonio K Larry Klein
- Producer: Trevor Horn

Eddi Reader singles chronology
"Dear John" (1994)	"Nobody Lives Without Love" (1995)	"Town Without Pity" (1996)

"Nobody Lives Without Love" is a song by Scottish singer-songwriter Eddi Reader, released in 1995 as a single from the Batman Forever soundtrack. The song was written by Tonio K and Larry Klein, and was produced by Trevor Horn. It reached number 84 on the UK Singles Chart.

== Critical reception ==
Upon its release as a single, Larry Flick of Billboard stated that, until the release of "Nobody Lives Without Love", no "laid-back rock ballad" has "fully demanded your attention" since Lisa Loeb's "Stay (I Missed You)". He continued, "A sweeping orchestration accompanies Reader's soaring vocal, which seamlessly flows through four minutes of impressive bliss." The Gavin Report called it a "haunting piece" and noted that Reader "has never sounded better than she does on this breathy and sobering fair warning".

In a review of the Batman Forever soundtrack, John Everson of the Southtown Star described the song as the album's "sweetest ballad" and one that "sounds more like Everything but the Girl" than Tracey Thorn's contribution to the soundtrack. Neil Davidson of The Canadian Press commented, "Despite the bang-bang nature of this action flick, some of the best stuff is lo-fi and low-volume. The best examples are Eddi Reader's 'Nobody Lives Without Love' and Mazzy Star's 'Tell Me Now'".

Scott Hinkley Jr. of the Gannett News Service wrote, "Aside from the big names [on the soundtrack], there is another song that could see heavy radio play. 'Nobody Lives Without Love' by Eddi Reader is a ballad that rivals Brandy's contribution ('Where Are You Now?'). If the rest of her material is as impressive as her voice, Reader could get as big a boost from this record as the movie itself." Brian S. Maloney of the Santa Cruz Sentinel felt that "a compelling case can be made for Eddi Reader's ballad".

== Track listing ==
CD single

1. "Nobody Lives Without Love" - 5:05
2. "Wonderful Lie" - 4:32
3. "Red Face Big Sky" - 4:10

CD single (UK promo)

1. "Nobody Lives Without Love" (Edit) - 4:09

== Personnel ==
Nobody Lives Without Love

- Eddi Reader - vocals
- George De Angelis - keyboards, programming
- Greg Bone - guitars
- Roy Dodds - drums

Production

- Trevor Horn - producer of "Nobody Lives Without Love"
- Tim Weidner - engineer and mixing on "Nobody Lives Without Love"
- Greg Penny - producer of "Wonderful Lie" and "Red Face Big Sky"

== Charts ==
Chart (1995)	Peak position
UK Singles Chart	84
