= Prayer for the Dying =

1994 single by Seal

Single by Seal

from the album Seal
- B-side: "Dreaming in Metaphors" (piano version)
- Released: 9 May 1994
- Genre: Soul; funk
- Length: 5:30 (album version); 4:16 (single version)
- Label: ZTT
- Songwriters: Seal; Isidore
- Producer: Trevor Horn

Seal singles chronology
"Love Is Powerful" (1993)	"Prayer for the Dying" (1994)	"Kiss from a Rose" (1994)
"I'm Alive" (1995)	"Don't Cry" / "Prayer for the Dying" (1995)	"Fly Like an Eagle" (1997)

Licensed audio
- "Prayer for the Dying" on YouTube

"Prayer for the Dying" is a song by British musician Seal and Augustus Lundell "Gus" Isidore. It was released on 9 May 1994, by ZTT and Sire Records, as the lead single from the singer's second studio album, Seal (also known as Seal II) (1994), reaching number 14 on the UK Singles Chart and number 21 on the US Billboard Hot 100. In Canada, it became Seal's first of three songs to peak at number two on the RPM 100 Hit Tracks chart, becoming his joint highest-charting single in Canada. In November 1995, "Prayer for the Dying" was reissued as a double A-side with "Don't Cry" in the UK; this release reached number 51 on the UK chart. Its accompanying music video was directed by Paul Boyd.

== Critical reception ==
Larry Flick from Billboard magazine complimented the song as "a rhythmic, melodically complex effort. Smarter than your average top 40 hit, tune's chorus sneaks up on you when you're not looking and takes up permanent residence in your brain." Another Billboard editor, Melinda Newman, felt the song "has one of the catchier choruses" on the Seal album. Troy J. Augusto from Cash Box described it as a "sultry, smooth-as-silk mid-tempo number". He added, "One of those rare tracks that will work at top 40, rock and adult formats, 'Prayer for the Dying' sports a captivating bass line, a nifty, head-bobbing rhythm structure and Seal's wonderful, unique vocals. His prayers, it seems, are about to be answered." In his weekly UK chart commentary, James Masterton wrote that the singer "is back with another stunning piece of music, casting aside much of the electronics that characterised his debut album, still with Trevor Horn at the controls though and an instant chart smash."

Mark Sutherland from Melody Maker stated, "True, 'Prayer for the Dying' is a pleasantly sumptuous crooner". Another Melody Maker editor, Ian Gittins, viewed it as a "mawkish Aids single". Alan Jones from Music Week gave the song three out of five and named it Pick of the Week, saying, "After a slow start, this builds nicely into an edgy and convincing comeback, with a swirl of sound dominated by that familiar and perfectly measured voice." David Sinclair from The Times viewed it as "a mature soul ballad with a sinuous funk beat." He explained further, "Couched in a typically lush and large production by Trevor Horn, Seal's message is a spiritual tour de force about crossing bridges, walking on water and life going on, regardless. Rock meets soul to produce a smooth song with a big heart."

== Music video ==
The music video for "Prayer for the Dying" was directed by Scottish director Paul Boyd. The video begins with Seal standing in a dark, empty room with multiple doors in the white background. As Seal starts to sing he is then shown from different angles throughout the video in the now brighly lit room.

== Track listings ==
- UK CD1 and Australian CD single
1. "Prayer for the Dying" – 4:16
2. "Dreaming in Metaphors" (piano version) – 5:02
3. "Prayer for the Dying" (instrumental) – 4:15
4. "Crazy" (acoustic version) – 3:31
- UK CD2
1. "Prayer for the Dying" – 4:15
2. "Prayer for the Dying" (Eren/Ollie mix) – 4:57
3. "Prayer for the Dying" (Psalm dub) – 6:37
- UK 7-inch and cassette single
- US CD and cassette single
1. "Prayer for the Dying" – 4:15 (4:16 on UK 7-inch)
2. "Dreaming in Metaphors" (piano version) – 5:02
- US 7-inch single

A. "Prayer for the Dying" (album version) – 5:28
B. "Prayer for the Dying" (Divine Spirit mix) – 4:34

== Charts ==
=== Weekly charts ===
Chart (1994–1995)	Peak position
Australia (ARIA)	56
Belgium (Ultratop 50 Flanders)	33
Canada Top Singles (RPM)	2
Canada Adult Contemporary (RPM)	24
Europe (Eurochart Hot 100)	35
Europe (European AC Radio)	8
Europe (European Hit Radio)	4
Germany (GfK)	62
Iceland (Íslenski Listinn Topp 40)	2
Israel (Israeli Singles Chart)	29
Mexico (Notitas Musicales)	2
Netherlands (Single Top 100)	40
New Zealand (Recorded Music NZ)	13
Scottish Singles Sales (Official Charts)	17
Scottish Singles Sales (Official Charts) Double A-side with "Don't Cry"	54
Switzerland (Schweizer Hitparade)	49
UK Singles (Official Charts)	14
UK Singles (Official Charts) Double A-side with "Don't Cry"	51
UK Airplay (Music Week)	6
US Billboard Hot 100	21
US Adult Contemporary (Billboard)	16
US Alternative Airplay (Billboard)	3
US Pop Airplay (Billboard)	11

=== Year-end charts ===
Chart (1994)	Position
Canada Top Singles (RPM)	25
Europe (European Hit Radio)	25
Iceland (Íslenski Listinn Topp 40)	49
UK Singles (OCC)	176
US Billboard Hot 100	83
US Modern Rock Tracks (Billboard)	24
US Cash Box Top 100	40

== Release history ==
Region	Date	Format(s)	Label(s)	Ref.
United Kingdom	9 May 1994	7-inch vinyl; CD; cassette	ZTT	
Australia	30 May 1994	CD; cassette	ZTT	
