= Don't Cry (Seal song) =

1995 single by Seal

- US CD single; also regular cover art for other editions

Single by Seal

from the album Seal
- A-side: "Prayer for the Dying"
- Released: 27 November 1995
- Length: 6:17 (album version); 4:34 (single version)
- Label: ZTT
- Songwriter: Seal
- Producer: Trevor Horn

Seal singles chronology
"I'm Alive" (1995)	"Don't Cry" / "Prayer for the Dying" (1995)	"Fly Like an Eagle" (1997)

Licensed audio
- "Don't Cry" on YouTube

"Don't Cry" is a song by British singer-songwriter Seal. It was written by Seal, produced by Trevor Horn and released as the final single from Seal's second studio album, Seal (also known as Seal II) (1994), in November 1995 by ZTT Records. In most countries outside the United States, the song was issued as a double A-side with a re-release of "Prayer for the Dying". The accompanying music video for "Don't Cry" was directed by American director Wayne Isham.

== Critical reception ==
Melinda Newman from Billboard magazine wrote, "'Don't Cry' is a stripped-down (at least at the start), elegant love song." Music & Media noted, "Seal's honeyed voice provides a great balance for the Trevor Horn sound of ZTT. Listen to this track often enough and you'll believe that Seal is truly a sensitive and romantic guy." Emma Cochrane from Smash Hits praised the song as "hauntingly beautiful".

== Charts ==
=== Weekly charts ===
Weekly chart performance for "Don't Cry"
Chart (1995–1996)	Peak position
Canada Adult Contemporary (RPM)	2
Canada Top Singles (RPM)	6
UK Singles (Official Charts)	51
US Adult Contemporary (Billboard)	4
US Billboard Hot 100	33
US Hot R&B/Hip-Hop Songs (Billboard)	71
US Pop Airplay (Billboard)	14

=== Year-end charts ===
Year-end chart performance for "Don't Cry"
Chart (1996)	Position
Canada Adult Contemporary (RPM)	30
Canada Top Singles (RPM)	45
US Adult Contemporary (Billboard)	9
US Billboard Hot 100	100

== Release history ==
Region	Version	Date	Format(s)	Label(s)	Ref.
United States	"Don't Cry"	14 November 1995	Rhythmic contemporary; contemporary hit radio	ZTT; Warner Bros.	
United Kingdom	"Don't Cry" / "Prayer for the Dying"	27 November 1995	CD; cassette	ZTT	
