= Kiss from a Rose =

1994 single by Seal

Single by Seal

from the album Seal (Seal II) and Batman Forever: Music from the Motion Picture
- B-side: "The Wind Cries Mary"; "Blues in 'E'" (1994)
- Released: July 1994
- Studio: Sarm West (London); Real World (Wiltshire)
- Genre: Rock; soul; baroque pop
- Length: 4:47 (album version); 3:38 (radio edit)
- Label: ZTT
- Songwriter: Seal Samuel
- Producer: Trevor Horn

Seal singles chronology
"Prayer for the Dying" (1994)	"Kiss from a Rose" (1994)	"Newborn Friend" (1994)

Music videos
- "Kiss from a Rose" on YouTube; "Kiss from a Rose" (Batman Forever version) on YouTube

1995 re-release
- Batman Forever soundtrack single

"Kiss from a Rose"
Seal's "Kiss from a Rose" from Seal (aka Seal II), Music From & Inspired by the Neverending Story III: Here Come The Fantasians and Batman Forever: Music from the Motion Picture

"Kiss from a Rose" is a song from British singer-songwriter Seal's second eponymous album (1994). The song was first released as a single in July 1994 by ZTT Records and was included in the film The NeverEnding Story III that year.

The song was re-released a year later in 1995 as part of the Batman Forever film soundtrack, helping it top the charts in the United States and Australia. The song also reached the top 10 in several other countries, including Canada, France, Iceland and Norway. At the 1996 Grammy Awards, it won awards for Record of the Year, Song of the Year, and Best Male Pop Vocal Performance. Two different music videos were produced to promote the single, directed by Matthew Rolston and Joel Schumacher, respectively.

== Background ==
"Kiss from a Rose" was written in 1987, several years prior to the release of Seal's eponymous debut album from 1991. After writing the song, Seal felt "embarrassed by it" and "threw the tape in the corner". Seal did not present it to producer Trevor Horn until the recording sessions for Seal II. In 2015, Seal said of the song: "To be honest, I was never really that proud of it, though I like what Trevor did with the recording. He turned that tape from my corner into another 8 million record sales and my name became a household name".

"Kiss from a Rose" was the second single taken from the Batman Forever film soundtrack, and topped the US Billboard Hot 100 for one week in August 1995. It also went to number four on the UK Singles Chart, where it had originally reached number 20 in 1994. It was also nominated for the MTV Movie Award for Best Song from a Movie in 1996.

Seal talked about the long, strange journey that the song went through on The Brian McKnight Show season finale that aired 30 May 2010. He described how the song initially dropped out of the charts shortly after its release. Joel Schumacher subsequently called Seal, and requested use of the song to play over a love scene between the characters played by Nicole Kidman and Val Kilmer in Batman Forever.

== Critical reception ==
Melinda Newman from Billboard magazine wrote, "The swelling music of the sexy mid-tempo ballad 'Kiss from a Rose' hypnotizes as it enchants." Chuck Campbell from Knoxville News Sentinel felt that "fairy-tale-ish melodies and harmonies" uplift the song. Ian Gittins from Melody Maker noted its "would-be butterfly sigh". Another Melody Maker editor, Andrew Mueller, named it "a nondescript wine bar ballad". Pan-European magazine Music & Media commented, "Sealed with a kiss, here you get a ballad and a half! It's got the right pathos and the unavoidable violins. The thorn, needed to show the sincerity, comes from the razor sharp alto sax".

Alan Jones from Music Week wrote, "Seal's magnificent 'Kiss from a Rose' – now subtitled 'Love Theme from Batman Forever' – is back a mere year after its first release when it reached number 19. A complex yet melodic song, it has remained a radio staple since it was first released, and is ready to explode". Leesa Daniels from Smash Hits gave it a top score of five out of five and named it Best New Single, saying, "A glorious ballad that will send shivers up and down your spine as soon as Seal opens his mouth. It's very atmospheric and moody, you can almost see the dry ice they'll use to death in the video. More importantly, it's one tune that you'll never, ever get bored of listening to." Another Smash Hits editor, Emma Cochrane, remarked that it "shows what an incredible range his voice has".

== Music video ==
Two versions of the music video for "Kiss from a Rose" were produced:

- The original version is set in a photographic studio and was co-directed by Matthew Rolston and William Levin. The 1966 film Blowup was heavily referenced in the video.
- The second version was directed by Joel Schumacher and has Seal performing the song beside the Bat-Signal, interspersed with clips from the film Batman Forever. This is the more well known video of the song. The director of photography was Neil Abramson.

== Legacy ==
"Kiss from a Rose" was ranked number 90 on Entertainment Weekly's "The 100 Greatest Summer Songs", saying, "Imagine Al Green in Camelot: Hitching a medieval melody to an R&B soul, Seal delivered a stunner as haunted and timeless as 'Sea of Love'."

== Track listing ==
Between all the formats of the single release, bonus tracks include the non-album tracks "The Wind Cries Mary" (a Jimi Hendrix cover) and "Blues in 'E'"; remixes of "Kiss from a Rose" by Adamski (who produced the original version of "Killer"); and remixes of album track "I'm Alive" by Steve Fitzmaurice and Sasha with BT.

- "Kiss from a Rose" (radio edit) – 3:38
- "Kiss from a Rose" (album version) – 4:47

== Charts ==
=== Weekly charts ===
Chart (1994)	Peak position
Australia (ARIA)	87
Europe (Eurochart Hot 100)	72
Europe (European AC Radio)	9
Europe (European Hit Radio)	15
Iceland (Íslenski Listinn Topp 40)	2
New Zealand (Recorded Music NZ)	24
Scottish Singles Sales (Official Charts)	20
UK Singles (Official Charts)	20
UK Airplay (Music Week)	12

Chart (1995)	Peak position
Australia (ARIA)	1
Austria (Ö3 Austria Top 40)	3
Belgium (Ultratop 50 Flanders)	36
Belgium (Ultratop 50 Wallonia)	11
Canada Top Singles (RPM)	2
Canada Adult Contemporary (RPM)	3
Denmark (IFPI)	10
Europe (Eurochart Hot 100)	12
Europe (European Hit Radio)	8
France (SNEP)	8
Germany (GfK)	11
Hungary (Mahasz)	6
Ireland (IRMA)	4
Israel (Israeli Singles Chart)	4
Mexico (Notitas Musicales)	1
Netherlands (Dutch Top 40)	4
Netherlands (Single Top 100)	3
New Zealand (Recorded Music NZ)	16
Norway (VG-lista)	3
Scottish Singles Sales (Official Charts) with "I'm Alive"	7
Sweden (Sverigetopplistan)	8
Switzerland (Schweizer Hitparade)	7
UK Singles (Official Charts) with "I'm Alive"	4
UK Airplay (Music Week)	1
US Billboard Hot 100	1
US Adult Contemporary (Billboard)	1
US Adult Pop Airplay (Billboard)	1
US Alternative Airplay (Billboard)	35
US Hot R&B/Hip-Hop Songs (Billboard)	52
US Pop Airplay (Billboard)	1
US Rhythmic Airplay (Billboard)	5
US Cash Box Top 100	1

Chart (2008)	Peak position
Denmark (Tracklisten)	6

Chart (2012)	Peak position
Australia (ARIA)	31

Chart (2025)	Peak position
Israel International Airplay (Media Forest)	15

=== Year-end charts ===
Chart (1994)	Position
Iceland (Íslenski Listinn Topp 40)	60

Chart (1995)	Position
Australia (ARIA)	3
Austria (Ö3 Austria Top 40)	39
Belgium (Ultratop 50 Wallonia)	71
Brazil (Crowley)	5
Canada Top Singles (RPM)	7
Canada Adult Contemporary (RPM)	64
Europe (Eurochart Hot 100)	31
Europe (European Hit Radio)	32
France (SNEP)	41
Germany (Media Control)	66
Israel (Israeli Singles Chart)	11
Netherlands (Dutch Top 40)	36
Netherlands (Single Top 100)	42
Sweden (Topplistan)	51
Switzerland (Schweizer Hitparade)	47
UK Singles (OCC)	39
UK Airplay (Music Week)	6
US Billboard Hot 100	4
US Adult Contemporary (Billboard)	7
US Top 40/Mainstream (Billboard)	4
US Top 40/Rhythm-Crossover (Billboard)	34
US Cash Box Top 100	1

Chart (1996)	Position
US Adult Contemporary (Billboard)	8
US Adult Top 40 (Billboard)	34

=== Decade-end charts ===
Chart (1990–1999)	Position
US Billboard Hot 100	58

== Certifications ==
Region	Certification	Certified units/sales
Australia (ARIA)	Platinum	70,000^{^}
Denmark (IFPI Danmark)	Platinum	90,000^{‡}
France (SNEP)	Gold	250,000^{*}
New Zealand (RMNZ)	3× Platinum	90,000^{‡}
Norway (IFPI Norway)	Gold	
Spain (Promusicae)	Gold	30,000^{‡}
United Kingdom (BPI)	2× Platinum	1,200,000^{‡}
United States (RIAA) (physical)	Gold	700,000
^{*} Sales figures based on certification alone.^{^} Shipments figures based on certification alone.^{‡} Sales+streaming figures based on certification alone.

== Release history ==
Region	Version	Date	Format(s)	Label(s)	Ref.
United Kingdom	"Kiss from a Rose"	July 1994	CD; cassette	ZTT	
Australia	"Kiss from a Rose"	22 August 1994	CD; cassette	ZTT	
Japan	Kiss from a Rose EP	17 November 1994	CD	ZTT	
United States	"Kiss from a Rose"	30 May 1995	Contemporary hit radio	Sire; Warner Bros.; ZTT	
United Kingdom	"Kiss from a Rose" / "I'm Alive"	3 July 1995	CD; cassette	ZTT	
Japan	Kiss from a Rose EP (re-release)	15 November 1998	CD	WEA	

== See also ==
- List of number-one singles in Australia during the 1990s
- List of Hot 100 number-one singles of 1995 (U.S.)
- List of Hot Adult Contemporary number ones of 1995
- List of Mainstream Top 40 number-one hits of 1995 (U.S.)
