= Seal (1994 album) =

Studio album by Seal
- Released: 23 May 1994
- Recorded: 1993–1994
- Studios: Sarm West, Sarm East and Angel Recording Studios (London, UK); Hook End Recording Studios (Oxfordshire, UK); Real World Studios (Box, Wiltshire, UK); Sarm West Coast (Los Angeles, California, USA)
- Genres: Progressive soul; pop; dance
- Length: 50:29
- Labels: Zang Tumb Tuum; Sire (US)
- Producer: Trevor Horn

Seal chronology
Seal (1991)	Seal (1994)	Human Being (1998)

Singles from Seal
- 1. "Prayer for the Dying" Released: 9 May 1994; 2. "Kiss from a Rose" Released: 11 July 1994; 3. "Newborn Friend" Released: 24 October 1994; 4. "I'm Alive" Released: 1995; 5. "Don't Cry" Released: 27 November 1995

Professional ratings
Review scores
Source	Rating
AllMusic	4.5/5 stars
Christgau's Consumer Guide	(dud)
Encyclopedia of Popular Music	4/5 stars
Entertainment Weekly	A
Knoxville News Sentinel	2/5 stars
Los Angeles Times	3/4 stars
NME	4/10
Rolling Stone	4/5 stars
The Rolling Stone Album Guide	4/5 stars
Smash Hits	2/5

"Kiss from a Rose"
Seal's "Kiss from a Rose" from Seal (aka Seal II) and Batman Forever: Music from the Motion Picture

Seal (sometimes referred to as Seal II to avoid confusion with the 1991 album of the same name) is the second eponymous studio album by British singer Seal. The album was released in 1994 on ZTT and Sire Records and features the worldwide smash hit single "Kiss from a Rose".

The image on the cover has since become nearly synonymous with Seal, in that it has appeared on several singles covers and was reused for his greatest hits album.

== Track listing ==
No.	Title	Writer(s)	Length
1.	"Bring It On"	Chris Bruce; Lisa Coleman; Wendy Melvoin; Carmen Rizzo; Augustus Isidore; Seal	3:58
2.	"Prayer for the Dying"	Isidore; Seal	5:30
3.	"Dreaming in Metaphors"	Isidore; Seal	5:52
4.	"Don't Cry"	Seal	6:17
5.	"Fast Changes"	Isidore; Seal	5:42
6.	"Kiss from a Rose"	Seal	4:47
7.	"People Asking Why"	Seal	4:45
8.	"Newborn Friend"	Seal	4:05
9.	"If I Could" (duet with Joni Mitchell)	Seal	4:16
10.	"I'm Alive"	Coleman; Melvoin; Rizzo; Isidore; Seal	4:02
11.	"Bring It On (Reprise)"	Bruce; Coleman; Melvoin; Rizzo; Isidore; Seal	1:15

30th anniversary deluxe edition CD2
No.	Title	Writer(s)	Length
1.	"Bring It On" (Alternate Version)		5:35
2.	"Reality"	Seal	4:34
3.	"Prayer for the Dying" (Alternate Version)		5:31
4.	"Kiss from a Rose" (Alternate Version)		5:11
5.	"Fast Changes" (Alternate Version)		5:42
6.	"Newborn Friend" (Alternate Version)		3:59
7.	"I'm Alive" (Alternate Version)		4:10
8.	"Don't Cry" (Alternate Version)		6:22
9.	"People Asking Why" (Alternate Version)		5:21
10.	"Dreaming in Metaphors" (Alternate Version)		5:04
11.	"If I Could" (Alternate Version)		3:52
12.	"Love Is Powerful"	Seal	3:04
13.	"Manic Depression" (featuring Jeff Beck)	Jimi Hendrix	5:13
14.	"Blues in 'E'"	Seal	3:43
15.	"The Wind Cries Mary"	Hendrix	3:54
16.	"Fly Like an Eagle"	Steve Miller	4:15

== Personnel ==
- Seal – vocals, musician
- Gus Isidore, Jamie Muhoberac, Lisa Coleman, Wendy Melvoin – principal musicians
- Joseph "Amp" Fiddler, Andy Duncan, Andy Newmark, Anne Dudley, Anthony Pleeth, Barry Wilde, Ben Cruft, Betsy Cook, Bill Benham, Bob Smissen, Boguslaw Kostecki, Carmen Rizzo, Charley Drayton, Chris Bruce, Chris Laurence, D'Influence, David Oladunni, David Theodore, Derek Watkins, Dick Morgan, Eddie Roberts, Garfield Jackson, Gavyn Wright, George Robertson, Gota Yashiki, Harvey Mason, Helen Liebmann, Ian Thomas, Jackie Shave, Jeff Beck, Jim McLeod, John Pigneguy, Jonathan Evans-Jones, Judd Proctor, Katie Wilkinson, Laurence Cottle, Luís Jardim, Maciej Rakowski, Mark Berrow, Mark Mann, Martin Loveday, Mike Brittain, Mike De Saulles, Nicholas Busch, Pandit Dinesh, Patrick Kiernan, Paul Kegg, Perry Montague-Mason, Peter Oxer, Phil Spalding, Pino Palladino, Richard Cottle, Rita Manning, Roger Garland, Roger Smith, Sam Maitland, Sarah Webb, Tim Weidner, Tony Stanton, Trevor Horn, Wilfred Gibson, William Orbit – musicians
- Eric Caudieux, Carmen Rizzo, Tim Weidner – programming
- Anne Dudley, Wil Malone – string arrangements
- Graeme Perkins – orchestra session arrangements
- Joni Mitchell – additional vocals (9)

=== Production ===
- Trevor Horn – producer
- Robin Barclay, Sean Cherney, Steve Fitzmaurice, Gregg Jackman, Steve MacMillan, Carmen Rizzo, Tim Weidner, Paul Wright – engineers
- Steve Fitzmaurice, Steve MacMillan, Tim Weidner – mixing
- Richard Lowe – first assistant engineer
- Howard Bargroff, Tom Elmhirst, Andrew Gallimore, Efren Herrera – assistant engineers
- Bill Ward – technical backup
- Stephen Marcussen – mastering at Precision Mastering (Hollywood, California, USA)
- Mike Higham – production assistant
- Michael Nash Associates – design
- Nick Knight – photography
- Bob Cavallo, John Wadlow – management

== Charts ==
=== Weekly charts ===
Weekly chart performance for Seal II
Chart (1994–96)	Peak position
Australian Albums (ARIA)	2
Austrian Albums (Ö3 Austria)	8
Canada Top Albums/CDs (RPM)	3
Dutch Albums (Album Top 100)	3
European Albums (European Top 100 Albums)	6
German Albums (Offizielle Top 100)	25
New Zealand Albums (RMNZ)	4
Scottish Albums (Official Charts)	19
Swedish Albums (Sverigetopplistan)	33
Swiss Albums (Schweizer Hitparade)	15
UK Albums (Official Charts)	1
US Billboard 200	15

Chart (2024)	Peak position
Hungarian Physical Albums (MAHASZ)	25

=== Year-end charts ===
1994 year-end chart performance for Seal II
Chart (1994)	Rank
Canada Top Albums/CDs (RPM)	82
European Albums (European Top 100 Albums)	56
German Albums (Offizielle Top 100)	97
New Zealand Albums (RMNZ)	30
UK Albums (OCC)	37
US Billboard 200	92

1995 year-end chart performance for Seal II
Chart (1995)	Rank
Australian Albums (ARIA)	81
Canada Top Albums/CDs (RPM)	28
Dutch Albums (Album Top 100)	90
New Zealand Albums (RMNZ)	19
UK Albums (OCC)	46
US Billboard 200	56

== Certifications ==
Certifications and sales for Seal II
Region	Certification	Certified units/sales
Australia (ARIA)	Platinum	70,000^{^}
Brazil (Pro-Música Brasil)	Gold	100,000^{*}
Germany (BVMI)	Gold	250,000^{^}
Netherlands (NVPI)	Gold	50,000^{^}
New Zealand (RMNZ)	Platinum	15,000^{^}
Spain (Promusicae)	Gold	50,000^{^}
United Kingdom (BPI)	2× Platinum	600,000^{^}
United States (RIAA)	5× Platinum	5,000,000^{‡}
Summaries
Europe (IFPI)	Platinum	1,000,000^{*}
^{*} Sales figures based on certification alone.^{^} Shipments figures based on certification alone.^{‡} Sales+streaming figures based on certification alone.
