= The Riddler (song) =

Single by Method Man

from the album Batman Forever
- B-side: "The Riddler" (Instrumental)
- Released: October 24, 1995
- Recorded: 1994
- Genre: Hip hop
- Length: 3:30
- Label: Atlantic
- Songwriter: Clifford Smith
- Producer: RZA

Method Man singles chronology
"Ice Cream" (1995)	"The Riddler" (1995)	"Shadowboxin'" (1996)

"The Riddler" is a single by Method Man from the Batman Forever soundtrack based on the character of the same name. It was released on October 24, 1995 for Atlantic Records and produced by fellow Wu-Tang Clan member, RZA. The single found decent success, making it to four different Billboard charts, including #56 on the magazine's main chart, the Billboard Hot 100.

A promotional music video directed by Diane Martel was released with Method Man performing the song intercut with scenes from the film featuring The Riddler.

The song was re-released on the 2014 deluxe version of Tical.

== Track listing ==
=== A-side ===
1. "The Riddler" (Album Version)
2. "The Riddler" (Hide-Out Remix)

=== B-side ===
1. "The Riddler" (Album Instrumental)
2. "The Riddler" (Hide-Out Remix Instrumental)

== Charts ==
Chart (1995)	Peak position
US Billboard Hot 100	56
US Hot R&B/Hip-Hop Songs (Billboard)	41
US Hot Rap Songs (Billboard)	4
US Hot Dance Music/Maxi-Singles Sales (Billboard)	8
