= I'm Alive (Seal song) =

Single by Seal

from the album Seal
- Released: 1995
- Genre: Pop
- Length: 4:02
- Label: ZTT; Sire
- Songwriter(s): Seal
- Producer(s): Trevor Horn

Seal singles chronology
| "Newborn Friend" (1994) | "I'm Alive" (1995) | "Don't Cry" (1995) |

Licensed audio
- "I'm Alive" on YouTube

"I'm Alive" is a song by British singer Seal, released as dance remix in 1995 as the fourth single from his second studio album, Seal (also known as Seal II) (1994). In the United States, the song appeared as B-side to "Kiss from a Rose".

== Critical reception ==
Fell and Rufer from the Gavin Report wrote in their review of "I'm Alive", "As with his previous singles it's fresh, inventive and moody without losing touch with pop music's core. Provacative pop to be sure."

== Track listing ==
UK 12″ single
| No. | Title | Length |
|---|---|---|
| 1. | "I'm Alive" (Sasha & BT's Atraxion Future Mix) | 13:48 |
| 2. | "Kiss from a Rose" (Kicks from a Rhodes) | 6:42 |
| 3. | "I'm Alive" (Atraxion Future Radio Edit) | 4:11 |

US CD single
| No. | Title | Length |
|---|---|---|
| 1. | "Kiss from a Rose" | 4:47 |
| 2. | "I'm Alive" | 4:02 |

== Charts ==
Chart performance for "I'm Alive"
| Chart (1995) | Peak position |
|---|---|
| UK Club Chart (Music Week) | 18 |
