= Batman Forever (soundtrack) =

Batman Forever: Music from the Motion Picture

Soundtrack album by various artists
- Released: May 30, 1995
- Recorded: September 1994−March 1995
- Length: 59:28
- Label: Atlantic
- Producers: Jolene Cherry (ex.); Joel Schumacher (ex.); Gary LeMel (ex.); Nellee Hooper; Bono; The Edge; Flood; PJ Harvey; John Parish; Lenny Kravitz; Trevor Horn; Massive Attack; The Insects (add.); Neil Davidge (add.); David Roback; Thom Wilson; RZA; Tim Simenon; The Devlins; Rick Nowels; Billy Steinberg; Garry Hughes; Brad Wood; The Flaming Lips

Singles from Batman Forever
- 1. "Hold Me, Thrill Me, Kiss Me, Kill Me" Released: June 5, 1995 (UK); 2. "Kiss from a Rose" Released: June 6, 1995 (US); 3. "Nobody Lives Without Love" Released: September 1995 (UK); 4. "The Riddler" Released: October 24, 1995 (US)

"Kiss from a Rose"
Seal's "Kiss from a Rose" from Seal (aka Seal II) and Batman Forever: Music from the Motion Picture.

Professional ratings
Review scores
Source	Rating
AllMusic	3/5 stars
Entertainment Weekly	B−
NME	5/10
Smash Hits	2/5 stars
Vox	4/10

Batman Forever: Music from the Motion Picture is the 1995 soundtrack to the motion picture Batman Forever.

== Background ==
Only five of the songs are actually featured in the movie. Hit singles from the soundtrack include "Hold Me, Thrill Me, Kiss Me, Kill Me" by U2 and "Kiss from a Rose" by Seal, both of which were nominated for MTV Movie Awards. "Kiss from a Rose" (whose video was also directed by Joel Schumacher) reached No. 1 in the U.S. charts as well. The soundtrack itself, featuring additional songs by the Flaming Lips, Brandy, the Offspring (songs also included in the film), Method Man, Nick Cave, Michael Hutchence (of INXS), PJ Harvey, and Massive Attack, was an attempt to (in producer Peter MacGregor-Scott's words) make the film more "pop". The soundtrack was hugely successful, selling almost as many copies as Prince's soundtrack to the 1989 Batman film. A second album, featuring over 40 minutes of Elliot Goldenthal's Original Motion Picture Score, was released two weeks after the soundtrack album.

Accolades

In 1996, "Kiss from a Rose" won three Grammy Awards for Best Male Pop Vocal Performance, Record of the Year and Song of the Year.

== Track listing ==
No.	Title	Writer(s)	Producer(s)	Length
1.	"Hold Me, Thrill Me, Kiss Me, Kill Me" (U2)	Bono (lyrics); U2 (music)	Nellee Hooper; Bono; The Edge	4:46
2.	"One Time Too Many" (PJ Harvey)	Harvey	Flood; Harvey; John Parish	2:52
3.	"Where Are You Now?" (Brandy)	Lenny Kravitz	Kravitz	3:57
4.	"Kiss from a Rose" (Seal)	Seal	Trevor Horn	3:38
5.	"The Hunter Gets Captured by the Game" (Massive Attack with Tracey Thorn)	William "Smokey" Robinson Jr.	Massive Attack; The Insects (add.); Neil Davidge (add.)	4:06
6.	"Nobody Lives Without Love" (Eddi Reader)	Tonio K.; Larry Klein	Horn	5:05
7.	"Tell Me Now" (Mazzy Star)	Hope Sandoval; David Roback	David Roback	4:17
8.	"Smash It Up" (The Offspring)	Rat Scabies; Captain Sensible; David Vanian; Alasdair Ward	Thom Wilson	3:26
9.	"There Is a Light" (Nick Cave)	Tim Friese-Greene (music); Cave (lyrics)		4:23
10.	"The Riddler" (Method Man)	Clifford Smith; Robert Diggs; Neil Hefti	RZA	3:30
11.	"The Passenger" (Michael Hutchence)	Iggy Pop (lyrics); Ricky Gardiner (music)	Tim Simenon	4:37
12.	"Crossing the River" (The Devlins)	Billy Steinberg; Rick Nowels; Colin Devlin	The Devlins; Nowels; Steinberg; Garry Hughes	4:45
13.	"8" (Sunny Day Real Estate)	Sunny Day Real Estate	Brad Wood	5:27
14.	"Bad Days" (The Flaming Lips)	Wayne Coyne; Michael Ivins; Steven Drozd; Ronald Jones	The Flaming Lips	4:39

== Personnel ==
- Executive Producers: Jolene Cherry, Joel Schumacher and Gary LeMel
- Project Supervisor: Leslie Reed
- Executive in Charge of Product Development for Atlantic: Michael Krumper
- Mastered by TAT with help from Stephen Marcussen at Precision Mastering, Hollywood, CA
- Executive in Charge of Music for Warner Bros: Gary LeMel
- Executive in Charge of Everything Else: Tom Lassally
- Production Assistant: Melanie Davidson
- Music Legal Services by Jeffrey Taylor Light and Ira Selsky of Myman, Abell, Fineman, Greenspan & Rowan
- Photography: Herb Ritts and Ralph Nelson
- Art Direction: Larry Freemantle

== Charts ==
=== Weekly charts ===
Chart (1995)	Peak position
Australian Albums (ARIA)	6
Austrian Albums (Ö3 Austria)	6
Belgian Albums (Ultratop Flanders)	49
Belgian Albums (Ultratop Wallonia)	29
Canada Top Albums/CDs (RPM)	2
Dutch Albums (Album Top 100)	42
Finnish Albums (Suomen virallinen lista)	10
German Albums (Offizielle Top 100)	16
Hungarian Albums (MAHASZ)	17
New Zealand Albums (RMNZ)	2
Scottish Albums (Official Charts)	24
Swedish Albums (Sverigetopplistan)	42
Swiss Albums (Schweizer Hitparade)	29
UK Compilation Albums (Official Charts)	11
US Billboard 200	5

=== Year-end charts ===
Chart (1995)	Position
Australian Albums (ARIA)	41
Canada Top Albums/CDs (RPM)	31
German Albums (Offizielle Top 100)	87
US Billboard 200	48

== Certifications and sales ==
Region	Certification	Certified units/sales
Australia (ARIA)	Platinum	70,000^{^}
Canada (Music Canada)	Platinum	100,000^{^}
New Zealand (RMNZ)	Gold	7,500^{^}
United Kingdom (BPI)	Silver	60,000^{^}
United States (RIAA)	2× Platinum	2,000,000^{^}
^{^} Shipments figures based on certification alone.
