= Greg Penny =

American record producer (born 1955)

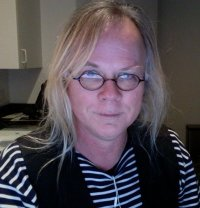

Background information
- Born: Greg Kevin Penny; October 12, 1955 (age 71); Hollywood, California, U.S.
- Genres: Pop; Rock; Country; Jazz; Classical
- Occupations: Record Producer; A&R; Recording Engineer / Mixer Songwriter; Musician
- Instruments: Guitar; keyboards; bass; drums; vocals
- Years active: 1975 – Present
- Labels: Flower Records; Sire Records; Warner Bros. Records; Universal Music; Sony Music; EMI Music

Greg Penny (born October 12, 1955, in Hollywood, California) is an American Grammy nominated record producer, A&R executive, recording engineer, mixer, musician, and songwriter. He is best known for his work as a producer for Elton John and k.d. lang, as well as for his work in immersive and spatial audio production. His career spans more than five decades, during which he has worked on recordings that have sold over 45 million copies worldwide.

He is the founder, chief executive, and creative director of Boombox Global, an entertainment company specializing in music-driven immersive experiences presented in bespoke listening theaters.

== Early life and background ==
Penny was born into a musical family in Hollywood, California. He is the son of famed pop singer Sue Thompson and country-western guitarist, comedian, songwriter, and producer Hank Penny. Along with Amand Gautier, Hank Penny was the co-founder of the Palomino Club (North Hollywood) in 1949, and a frequent collaborator of guitar designer Leo Fender. Hank & Sue worked together performing live in the L.A. area, touring, and on The Spade Cooley Show on local TV station KTLA.

The Penny family re-located to Nevada (Las Vegas and Carson City) in 1956 to take advantage of the burgeoning entertainment opportunities in the "Nevada Circuit" - Vegas, Reno, Tahoe.

In 1961 Sue Thompson signed with Hickory Records Nashville. She very quickly had Three top 5 hit singles. Sad Movies (Make Me Cry), Norman, and James (Hold The Ladder Steady). Sue and Hank divorced in 1963. They remained close friends, performing together at times. Greg Penny spent most of his youth living in Las Vegas with his mother Sue and older sister, Julie (from Sue's first marriage).

Growing up around recording studios and professional musicians in Los Angeles, Las Vegas and Nashville, Greg Penny developed an early interest in music production and familiarity with sound recording processes. He knew from an early age that he wanted to be a record producer.

Elton John - Goodbye Yellow Brick Road

Penny met Elton John in September 1971, after attending his concert in Las Vegas with his mother, Sue, an artist whose recordings John admired. The two developed a friendship, maintaining contact and meeting at concerts over the following year. In May 1973, while planning a trip to Europe to pursue music studies, Penny was invited by John to visit the Château d'Hérouville studio (aka Honky Château) near Paris, where John and his band were recording Goodbye Yellow Brick Road. Penny joined the sessions during the final stages of recording with John, producer Gus Dudgeon, engineer David Hentschel, and band members including Davey Johnstone, Nigel Olsson, and Dee Murray.

During the final days of recording, British filmmaker, actor, and author Bryan Forbes brought a film crew to the Château d’Hérouville to shoot studio footage for the documentary Elton John and Bernie Taupin Say Goodbye Norma Jean and Other Things (1973).

== Career ==
=== Early career (1975–1981) ===
Dinah! Penny began his professional career in Hollywood in the mid-1970s as an independent record producer, making demos with new artists, working odd day jobs (floral delivery, waiter) and knocking on doors to get into the music business, before joining the television program Dinah! as a production assistant from 1976 to 1978.

Dinah! was recorded at CBS Television City in Hollywood. Often shooting six 90 minute shows in a four-day studio week, plus locations like Las Vegas, it was very busy. In his role, Penny was tasked with looking after guests appearing on the show. Picking them up from their home or the airport, making sure they arrived on set safely and remaining with them throughout their stay, often taking care of them for multiple days at a time.

Penny worked daily with Dinah Shore the namesake of the show, and with many Hollywood Icons including:

- Fred Astaire
- Gene Kelly
- Ann Miller
- Bob Hope
- Phil Silvers
- Bette Davis
- Jonathan Winters
- Richard Widmark
- Cindy Williams
- Orson Welles

Also, contemporary celebrities of the time:

- Muhammad Ali
- Tom Waits
- Mark Hamill also

Andy Kaufman and Anthony Daniels both of whom Penny became friends with.

Additionally the author Alex Haley who Penny retrieved from Los Angeles International Airport the day after his book Roots: The Saga of an American Family had shown as an episodic TV series - and they were besieged by crowds of fans.

It was during this period that Penny first met 1.Michael Jackson (who he later frequently spent time with, along with Quincy Jones during the making of Thriller (album), as the three were working at Westlake Studios LA) and 2. Cher (who Penny later produced in London) both were filming their respective TV shows at CBS Television City. The Jacksons and Cher (TV series).

Warner Bros. Music Publishing - LA

Through help from songwriter and mentor Alan O'Day, Penny got a job at Warner Bros Music Publishing in Los Angeles (1978–1979) as a professional manager. Penny already had knowledge of music publishing from time spent with his mother at Acuff-Rose in Nashville, and was thrilled to be working on the great classic catalogs of George and Ira Gershwin, Allen Toussaint and others, also signing young contemporary writers and working closely with:

- Stan Lynch (Tom Petty and The Heartbreakers)
- Gary Valentine (Blondie, The Know)
- Phil Seymour (The Dwight Twilley Band)

as well as:

- Giorgio Moroder and
- Keith Forsey

During his time at Warner Bros. Music, Penny was acquainted with early songs by Diane Warren, who was then a protégé of songwriter Alan O'Day. Warren would occasionally visit the offices to play her material, and Penny recalls her early promise prior to her later commercial success. This formative period at Warner Bros. helped shape Penny's approach to working with artists, repertoire, and recorded music, laying the foundation for his later career as a producer, engineer, and mixer.

Warner Bros. Music Publishing - London

At the invitation of Rob Dickins Managing Director of Warner Bros Music Publishing UK. Penny relocated to London to continue with Warner Bros. Music UK (1979–1981). During this period, he worked closely with Madness (band), Original Mirrors, Members of the Art Rock band from Liverpool - Deaf School while still working with Moroder and Forsey. Eventually signing Moroder to a worldwide publishing deal with Warner / Chappell Music.

He also served as A&R Director at Korova Records (a joint venture between Sire Records and Warner Bros Music Publishing in London), where he worked with mentors Dickins and Sire president Seymour Stein, and a small roster of artists including Echo & the Bunnymen.

=== Independent Production Career (1981–present) ===
Penny left Warner Bros. Music UK and moved back to Los Angeles in early 1981. From then onward, Penny established himself as an independent producer, A&R man, engineer, and mixer, working across Los Angeles, Nashville, London, Paris, Brussels and Tokyo.

Penny's career reflects decades of experience in identifying, developing, and presenting recorded music, working closely with artists and repertoire across a wide range of genres.

As an independent in LA, he maintained his relationship with Warner Bros. Records, searching for new and interesting artists to work with and presenting them to labels for signing.

Giorgio Moroder, Keith Forsey and Sparks

He increased his work with Giorgio Moroder and Keith Forsey, co-writing songs with Forsey for the Giorgio Moroder / Joe Esposito album "Solitary Men" and engineering and mixing projects for Moroder's company. At that time Sparks (band) were signed to Moroder's imprint and Penny knew them socially. Sparks and Moroder asked Penny to work with them on new song called "Modesty Plays" which was released in Europe in early 1983 and became a hit in France.

Sparks were in Paris to do radio and TV promotion for "Modesty Plays" and Penny joined them there. This trip was the beginning of him working and living in Europe more frequently. He did some mixing work in Paris, and was contracted by RKM Records in Brussels to write and produce a new album with Belgian Punk Artiste Plastic Bertrand. Penny wrote many of the songs, played multiple instruments, produced, engineered and mixed the album that became Chat va...Et toi?. (credited as Greg Peny).

It was during this trip that Penny met his future wife, Katia Lempkowicz, who was at this time already a successful singer, making solo records of her own, doing commercial session work and also as a background vocalist for many Brussels based artists. She relocated to Hollywood to live with Penny in the fall of 1983. They were married in The Hotel de Ville Grand Place in Brussels on July 3, 1985. Together they comprise the band Poperetta who later had success with the album called Poperetta @ Saint Tropez.

Family Ties - Penny continued doing session work in LA, and worked as a singing coach and producer for Tina Yothers from the TV series Family Ties at Paramount Studios in Hollywood. This led to the producers of Family Ties creating a special episode called "Band On The Run" February 26, 1987, in which Yothers character Jennifer and her band, The Permanent Waves, try out for the homecoming dance at Leland College. They do so well, Alex, Jennifer's older brother Alex - Michael J. Fox sees a chance to make money, and convinces them to let him be their manager. The episode featured Christina Applegate, and Rain Phoenix. Penny produced the music for this episode.

Dolly Dots - Hearts Beat Thunder (1987) Penny and Larry Lee co-wrote Hearts Beat Thunder for Dolly Dots. It was the opening track and single for their film "Dutch Treat".

"Hearts Beat Thunder" by Dolly Dots

=== Production, Engineering, and Mixing Work ===
Production

=== Martini Ranch ===
Penny produced Holy Cow, the album by Martini Ranch, a band featuring actor Bill Paxton and Andrew Todd Rosenthal for Sire Records (1988). The album includes guest appearances from Devo members Bob Casale, Alan Myers and Mark Mothersbaugh; Cindy Wilson of the B-52's, film composer Mark Isham; and actors Judge Reinhold and Bud Cort.

Martini Ranch have drawn comparisons to Devo, the B-52's, and Oingo Boingo. Ira Robbins of Trouser Press described the band as a "wickedly inventive, visually oriented pop-culture nuthouse," labeling Holy Cow as "kinetic, silly, intelligent and infectious." AllMusic's William Cooper was also complimentary of the record, writing, "While the album's novelty approach wears thin, there's a surprising surplus of melody and songcraft."

The single "Reach" was popular and received high-rotation plays on KROQ LA.

The Spaghetti Western themed music video for Reach was directed James Cameron. It featured many of Paxton and Cameron's Hollywood acting friends in cameo roles. Kathryn Bigelow, Lance Henriksen, Paul Reiser, Jenette Goldstein, Judge Reinhold, Brian Thompson, Adrian Pasdar and Bud Cort.

At Cameron's suggestion, Penny created an extended mix of the music track to increase its running time for broadcast exposure.

=== k.d.lang ===
He co-produced, recorded and mixed, k.d. lang's Absolute Torch and Twang (1989), and later Ingénue (1992) for which he co-wrote, with lang, the song "So It Shall Be". The album received the Grammy Award for Best Female Pop Vocal Performance.

=== Elton John ===
Penny worked extensively with Elton John in the early 1990s. He served as Production Supervisor on Duets (Elton John album), producing tracks featuring k.d. lang and Little Richard, as well as the Elton John solo track “Duets for One”.

He subsequently co-produced Made in England (album)(1995) with John at AIR Studios Lyndurst Hall, London.

Additional production work includes projects with:

- Gleaming Spires
- Sparks (band)
- Martini Ranch
- Marc Anthony Thompson
- k.d. lang
- Rickie Lee Jones
- Maura O'Connell
- Sun 60
- Nathalie Archangel
- Marc Jordan
- Elton John
- Eddi Reader
- Kiki Dee
- Paul Young
- Cher
- Ryan Downe

Production, Engineering, and Mixing Work Production Penny has produced recordings for artists including: Elton John (Duets, Made in England) k.d. lang (Absolute Torch and Twang, Ingénue) Cher (It's a Man's World) Paul Young Poperetta (Poperetta @ St. Tropez) Sparks Eddi Reader Maura O'Connell Marc Jordan Sun 60 Marc Anthony Thompson Gleaming Spires Martini Ranch (Holy Cow) Ryan Downe

=== Engineering and Mixing ===
Penny has engineered and mixed recordings for artists including:

- Rickie Lee Jones (Flying Cowboys, Pop Pop)
- Tim Finn (Before & After)
- Roy Orbison (King of Hearts)
- David Bowie (“Cat People (Putting Out Fire)”)

=== Immersive Audio Work ===
Penny has been active in immersive audio production, particularly in Dolby Atmos. In 2013, he mixed “Rocket Man” by Elton John in Dolby Atmos, widely cited as one of the first pieces of music mixed in the format and among the earliest applications of immersive audio to popular music.

He mixed Fine Line (Harry Styles album) by Harry Styles in both Dolby Atmos and Sony 360 Reality Audio; for his immersive mix of the album, he received a Grammy Nomination for Best Immersive Audio Album in 2022.

He has mixed recordings in immersive formats for artists including:

- Elton John
- Harry Styles
- Lady Gaga
- Bradley Cooper
- Katy Perry
- The Weeknd
- Kygo (Sony 360 Reality Audio)
- Post Malone
- No Doubt
- Shawn Mendes
- Jonas Brothers
- Prince Royce (Sony 360 Reality Audio)
- Thirty Seconds to Mars
- Sistine Chapel Choir - Veni Domine (2017)

He has also mixed immersive releases for legacy artists including:

- Sting
- The Police
- Stevie Wonder
- Marvin Gaye
- The Temptations
- Bee Gees
- Nat King Cole
- Bing Crosby & David Bowie with the London Symphony Orchestra Peace On Earth / Little Drummer Boy
- Glen Campbell
- Queen
- Frankie Goes to Hollywood

Penny has also mixed 5.1 surround and Dolby Atmos editions of Elton John's catalog, including:

- Elton John (album)
- Tumbleweed Connection
- Madman Across the Water
- Honky Château (for which he received a Grammy Award nomination for Best Surround Album in 2006)
- Don't Shoot Me I'm Only the Piano Player
- Goodbye Yellow Brick Road
- Caribou
- Captain Fantastic and the Brown Dirt Cowboy
- Rock of the Westies
- Blue Moves
- Diamonds (Greatest Hits)

=== Film and Live Performance Work ===
Penny has worked on concert films and music-related productions as a producer and mixer.

His immersive work also includes original film soundtracks such as:

- The Lion King (soundtrack)
- Hercules (soundtrack)
- High School Musical (soundtrack)

AR Rahman - Le Musk Penny began collaborating with famed Indian composer AR Rahman in 2022 on the immersive film "Le Musk", which Rahman directed and composed the soundtrack. Penny created the Atmos mix of the key song "What's On A Man's Mind".

He is credited as "Immersive Audio Consultant" on the Dolby Atmos version of The Rolling Stones Rock and Roll Circus film mixed at Capitol Studios Hollywood with Steve Genewick. The film features performances by

- The Rolling Stones
- Marianne Faithfull
- Jethro Tull (with Tony Iommi)
- The Who
- Taj Mahal
- The Dirty Mac - The SuperGroup featuring:
- John Lennon (of the Beatles) – vocals, rhythm guitar
- Eric Clapton (of the then recently dissolved Cream) – lead guitar
- Keith Richards (of the Rolling Stones) – bass
- Mitch Mitchell (of the Jimi Hendrix Experience) – drums

Additional musicians on "Whole Lotta Yoko"

- Yoko Ono – vocals
- Ivry Gitlis – violin

A Special Evening with Elton John, a concert film recorded at the Greek Theatre in Los Angeles. 1994, Penny produced and mixed the audio (with Andy Strange).

Together with Elton John guitarist Davey Johnstone, Penny also contributed special music production for Elton John's Farewell Yellow Brick Road 330 date final world tour.

Industry and Consulting Work

Penny has worked as a consultant on immersive audio initiatives for major music companies including Universal Music Group and Sony, contributing to the development of spatial audio formats for streaming platforms.

Additional Roles

From 2016 to 2018, Penny worked with Apple Inc. as a Creative Pro - Music.

From 2016 to 2017, he served as a Specialist Instructor in Music Production and Audio Engineering for the Ventura County Office of Education.

=== Awards and Affiliations ===
Grammy Award (with k.d. lang) – Absolute Torch and Twang

Grammy Award – Ingénue (Best Female Pop Vocal Performance)

Grammy Award nomination (2022) Best Immersive Audio Album (for Harry Styles - Fine Line)

Grammy Award nomination (2006) – Best Surround Album (for Elton John - Honky Château)

Penny is a member of the Recording Academy (NARAS) and its Producers & Engineers Wing.

=== Personal life ===
Penny has lived and worked internationally, including in Los Angeles, Vancouver B.C., London, Paris, and Tokyo.

He resides between Ojai, California, and Shibuya, Tokyo, Japan.
