= Me (book) =

2019 autobiography of Elton John

- Author: Elton John
- Audio read by: Taron Egerton
- Language: English
- Genre: Autobiography
- Published: 15 October 2019
- Publisher: Macmillan Publishers
- Publication place: United Kingdom
- Pages: 350
- ISBN: 1-509-85331-6

Me is the autobiography of the English singer, pianist and composer Elton John. It was released on 15 October 2019 by Macmillan Publishers. It was ghostwritten by journalist Alexis Petridis, who worked on the book with John for three and a half years.

== Summary ==
Me recounts John’s childhood experiences as Reg Dwight, growing up in the 1950s in Pinner, North London, and his studies at the Royal Academy of Music. In the early chapters, John describes his early musical influences, collecting gramophone records and seeing performances at venues such as the Harrow Granada, including artists such as Little Richard, Jerry Lee Lewis and Eddie Cochran.

The book traces Elton John’s career from early days playing piano at the Northwood Hills Hotel, his first music industry job working at Mills Music on Denmark Street in London, and playing with Bluesology and Long John Baldry. In the early 1970s, John recalls responding to an advert in New Musical Express to audition for Liberty Records. After an unsuccessful audition, John recounts how Ray Williams put him in touch with lyricist Bernie Taupin, initiating a celebrated writing partnership that was to last for decades.

Throughout the book, John describes his associations with numerous people in the music industry, including his romantic and business partner John Reid. He covers his various romantic involvements, including his marriage to Renate Blauel.

The book contains frequent references to noted cultural figures of the day. John describes a 1976 meeting with Elvis Presley, whom he found to be in a poor state of mental and physical health. He also writes about his associations and friendships with personalities such as Elizabeth Taylor, Rod Stewart, Freddie Mercury, John Lennon, Gianni Versace and Diana, Princess of Wales. John recounts numerous memorable social occasions, including a dinner in the 1980s when Sylvester Stallone and Richard Gere exhibited rivalry over the attentions of Princess Diana. He also describes a socially awkward lunch party in 1993 with Michael Jackson, who John considered was "genuinely mentally ill" and "disturbing to be around".

In various chapters, the book addresses John's depression and suicide attempts, his cocaine addiction and alcoholism, and his later prostate cancer diagnosis. Recurring topics include his difficult relationship with his mother, his estrangement from his father and the famous "Dwight family temper". He admits he spent his whole career "trying to show my father what I'm made of". In later chapters, John's memoirs reflect on his reaction to the AIDS pandemic, the loss of friends and colleagues to HIV/AIDS, his support for Ryan White and the establishment of the Elton John AIDS Foundation. John describes the changes to his life following his marriage to David Furnish, and writes about his family life with their two children. The autobiography culminates with Elton John's final tour, Farewell Yellow Brick Road.

== Publication ==
Me was released by Macmillan Publishers on 15 October 2019. Excerpts read by Taron Egerton (who portrayed John in the biographical film Rocketman) aired on BBC Radio 4's Book of the Week in the first week of its release.

== Reception ==
Hadley Freeman, a writer for The Guardian, called the book "racy, pacy and crammed with scurrilous anecdotes", saying: "Elton makes fun of no one more than himself. He is utterly, astonishingly, hilariously self-lacerating." Variety dubbed the book "deeply dishy". A Time review said: "Like John’s songs, Me overflows with whimsical characters, twisted humor, winking self-aggrandizement and stark pathos. True to his spirit, it's a little silly and over the top, but it's also an absorbing and unfettered joy."

In The Daily Telegraph, Neil McCormick said: "If you are in the market for an autobiography crammed with sex, drugs and rock and roll, Elton is clearly your man."

In The Times, Will Hodgkinson said that John's "sad, funny memoir reveals the insecurities that drive his needy behaviour."

Writing in The Independent, Roisin O'Connor considered that the autobiography was "full of warmth and candour" and found Elton John's reflections on his failings to be "deeply moving". An analysis in BBC News highlighted the theme of John's strained relationship with his father in the book.

Janet Maslin of The New York Times praised John's memoir, stating that his "hard-won self-knowledge is what the book’s really about". Ron Dicker in the HuffPost, Justin Curto in Vulture and Patrick Ryan in USA Today all highlighted the recounted story of the awkward lunch party with Michael Jackson, noting John's frankness in his assessment of Jackson's mental health.
