= Music School (film) =

- Theatrical Release Poster
- Directed by: Papa Rao Biyyala
- Written by: Papa Rao Biyyala
- Produced by: Papa Rao Biyyala
- Starring: Shriya Saran; Sharman Joshi; Ozu Barua; Prakash Raj; Gracy Goswami; Suhasini Mulay; Shaan
- Cinematography: Kiran Deohans
- Edited by: Manan Ajay Sagar
- Music by: Ilaiyaraaja
- Production companies: Yamini FilmsFilms; Venkateshwara Creations; Aditya Movies
- Distributed by: PVR Pictures; AP International Films (International)
- Release date: 12 May 2023
- Country: India
- Languages: Telugu; Hindi

Music School is a 2023 Indian musical film made in Telugu and Hindi languages written and directed by Papa Rao Biyyala, starring Shriya Saran, Prakash Raj, Sharman Joshi, Ozu Barua and Gracy Goswami in important roles. The principal photography of the film started on 15 November 2021. The film has 12 songs, with 9 of them composed by Ilaiyaraaja. The film was released on 12 May 2023. Lyrics penned by Raman Raghuvanshi

== Premise ==
Music School is about the pressure applied by school systems and parents on children to continue with endless hours of studies, only studies. Thinking of making them doctors and engineers, thereby leaving no time for art and leisure activities for the students.

== Cast ==
- Shriya Saran as Maria D'Cruz
- Sharman Joshi as Manoj Kumar
- Shaan as Albert
- Gracy Goswami as Samyuktha Reddy
- Ozu Barua as Rinchen Thapa
- Prakash Raj as Commissioner Vikram Reddy, Samyuktha's father
- Suhasini Mulay as Shanta D'Cruz, Mary's mother
- Karthikeya Dev as Vijay Naidu
- Mona Ambegaonkar as Mrs. Naidu, Vijay's mother
- Benjamin Gilani
- Leela Samson as Devika Reddy, Samyuktha's grandmother
- Vinay Varma as Govind Rao Bhaskar Rao Kulkarni
- Srikanth Iyengar
- Mangala Bhatt
- Rajnish Sharma as Police Officer

== Production ==
Papa Rao Biyyala, a sports administrator and former member of the Indian Administrative Service (IAS), launched himself as feature film director with Music School, a musical, produced by the Hyderabad-based company Yamini Films. Choreographer Adam Murray, who worked in The King's Man, Cruella and Rocketman was the first among signed technicians. Ilaiyaraaja was signed as the composer of the film, who orchestrated and recorded the background score of the in Budapest, Hungary. Apart from Ilaiyaraaja's songs, the film also includes the song "Do-Re-Mi" from The Sound of Music and those were orchestrated by the London Philharmonic Orchestra. The film wrapped up its third schedule on 12 March 2022 and the complete pack up happened on 6 June 2022.

== Soundtrack ==
Hindi
No.	Title	Lyrics	Singer(s)	Length
1.	"Padhte Jao Bachcha"	Dr. Sagar, Raman Raghuvanshi	Priya Mali, Aditya Balaji, Hrithik Jayakish, Padmaja Sreenivasan, Vaimu, Sandeep	4:19
2.	"Teri Nigaahon Mein"	Dr. Sagar, Raman Raghuvanshi	Javed Ali, Shreya Ghoshal	3:17
3.	"Hichkaule"	Dr. Sagar, Raman Raghuvanshi	Karthik, Priya Malli	3:41
4.	"I am from Goa"	Dr. Sagar, Shivani Tibrewala	Srinisha Jayaseelan	4:14
5.	"Aa Kar Tu (Christmas Ki Raat)"	Dr. Sagar, Raman Raghuvanshi	Shaan	4:12
6.	"Only way to the Top"	Shivani Tibrewala, Dr. Sagar, Raman Raghuvanshi	Rahul Nambiar, Ranjith Govind & Karthik	4:57
7.	"IIT to MIT My Song Will Go"	Shivani Tibrewala, Dr. Sagar, Raman Raghuvanshi	Anitha Karthikeyan, RS Rakthaksh & K Vasudevan	4:46

Telugu
No.	Title	Lyrics	Singer(s)	Length
1.	"Chadhuve Chadhuvantaaru"	Rahman	Priya Mali, Sarath Santosh, Hrithik Jayakish, Neha Girish, Padmaja Sreenivasan, R S Rakthaksh	4:19
2.	"Evo Saraagaalu"	Rahman	Javed Ali, Shreya Ghoshal	3:17
3.	"Jhoom Jhoom"	Rahman	Sarath Santosh, Priya Malli	3:41
4.	"I am from Goa"	Rahman, Shivani Tibrewala	Srinisha Jayaseelan	4:14
