= Nick Hamm =

Irish film, television, and theatre director and producer

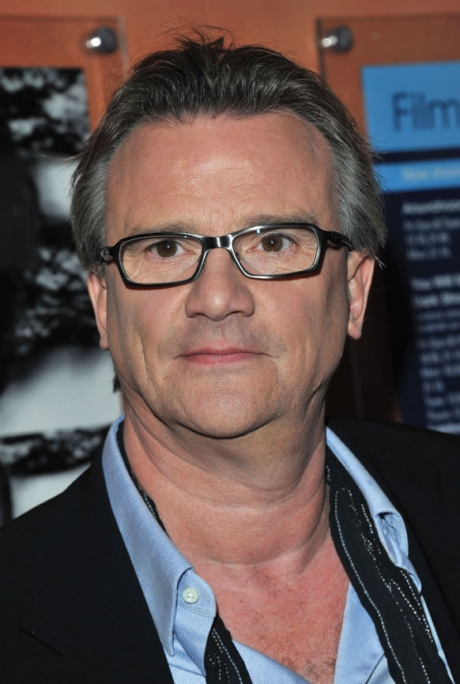
- Born: 10 December 1957 (age 68); Belfast, Northern Ireland

Nick Hamm is a filmmaker born in Belfast, Northern Ireland. He won a BAFTA for his drama The Harmfulness of Tobacco starring Edward Fox.

Hamm's films, The Journey starring Timothy Spall and Colm Meaney, and Driven starring Jason Sudeikis and Lee Pace, both premiered at the Venice International Film Festival and were later shown at TIFF.

In 2020, Hamm formed the London- and L.A.-based entertainment company Free Turn with his brother Jon.

== Early life and education ==
Hamm was born in Belfast, Northern Ireland to Marian and Patrick Hamm. He attended the University of Manchester and received his B.A. in English and Philosophy.

== Career ==
=== Theatre ===
Hamm began his career on the London fringe before becoming resident director of the Royal Shakespeare Company where he mainly focused on working with contemporary playwrights, including Howard Barker, Edward Bond and Arthur Miller.

=== Film ===
In 1989, Hamm transitioned into film, directing The Bottom Line, a documentary about the crisis of culture, featuring Dustin Hoffman and Arthur Miller. In 1992, Hamm won a BAFTA for his drama The Harmfulness of Tobacco starring Edward Fox. In 1996, he directed Talk of Angels (Miramax) starring Polly Walker and Vincent Perez, an epic love story set in the early days of the Spanish Civil War. He then directed the romantic comedy Martha, Meet Frank, Daniel and Laurence, a Film Four and Miramax co-production written by Peter Morgan and starring Joseph Fiennes.

In 2001, he received cult acclaim for directing The Hole, starring Thora Birch and Keira Knightley, in one of her first film roles. He then directed the 2004 thriller Godsend for Lionsgate Films, starring Robert De Niro, Rebecca Romijn and Greg Kinnear.

In 2011, Hamm partnered with Northern Ireland Screen to direct and produce Killing Bono, distributed in the UK by Paramount Pictures. Ben Barnes and Robert Sheehan star as two brothers struggling to forge their path through the 1980s Irish music scene in the shadow of their now famous school friends, U2.

In 2015, Hamm partnered again with Northern Ireland Screen and IM Global to direct The Journey. Screenplay by acclaimed Irish novelist, Colin Bateman, the drama is a fictionalized account of political enemies Ian Paisley and Martin McGuiness's real journey to peace and friendship in the 2006 St Andrews Agreement. Timothy Spall and Colm Meaney star as Paisley and McGuiness respectively, joined by Freddie Highmore, John Hurt, Toby Stephens and Ian Beattie. In July 2016, the film was announced as an official selection of the Toronto International Film Festival and premiering worldwide at the 73rd Venice International Film Festival on September 7, 2016. The film garnered critical acclaim upon release, winning Meany the IFTA award for Best Lead Actor.

In 2017, Hamm went on to direct Driven, his second collaboration with writer Colin Bateman (The Journey). Driven tells the story of the relationship between smuggler-turned-FBI informant, Jim Hoffman, and his glamorous neighbor, car mogul John DeLorean during the rise and fall of his 1970's DeLorean Motor Company. The comedy stars Jason Sudeikis, Lee Pace, Corey Stoll, and Judy Greer. In fall of 2018, Driven closed the 75th Venice International Film Festival before appearing at the 2018 Toronto International Film Festival. The Film premiered in August 2018 to positive reviews, often citing Lee Pace's impressive portrayal of the infamous John Delorean.

In 2021, Hamm directed and produced his latest feature film, Gigi & Nate, starring Marcia Gay Harden, Diane Ladd, Charlie Rowe and Josephine Langford. The film follows a young man who finds hope in an animal friend after a freak accident leaves him paralyzed.

Hamm's most recent feature is the 2024 historical epic William Tell, set in Switzerland and based on the play of the same name by Friedrich Schiller.

=== Television ===
Hamm's work in British television includes Play on One: Out of the Blue, starring Catherine Zeta-Jones and Colin Firth for the BBC, and the highly acclaimed series Rik Mayall Presents for Granada. These were a series of one-off television films with the alternative comedian Rik Mayall in more dramatic roles, with Hamm directing the Scarborough-set Dancing Queen with Helena Bonham Carter, and television satire Micky Love with Alan Cumming, Jennifer Ehle and Eleanor Bron.

In 2010, Hamm formed Momentum TV, a television production company based in the United States. In March 2012, Hamm received a green light to produce and direct Rogue as DirecTV/AT&T's first original series for Audience Network. In August 2014, Rogue was renewed for two more seasons.

Hamm also produced and was the showrunner for Full Circle for AT&T's Audience Network. Full Circle, a half-hour drama anthology series, was created by playwright Neil LaBute and inspired by the classic 1920 German play La Ronde. Season one, Full Circle: Los Angeles, starring Minka Kelly, Tom Felton, David Boreanaz, Kate Walsh, Ally Sheedy and Julian McMahon, premiered in 2013. Season two, Full Circle: Chicago, starring Terry O'Quinn, Calista Flockhart, Kate Burton, Chris Bauer, Rita Wilson and Brittany Snow premiered in 2015. Season three was shot in January 2016 with Dougray Scott and Kim Raver starring. The new chapter, entitled Full Circle: Miami, following the dangerous political ramifications of a presidential candidate's sex scandal, premiered in September 2016 on Audience Network.

In 2019, Hamm directed the pilot and three subsequent episodes of Netflix's White Lines, by Alex Pina – a series about a Mancunian DJ who mysteriously disappears in Ibiza. The show premiered on Netflix in spring 2020 and received raved reviews, quickly charting its way to the becoming one of the most watched shows on Netflix.

== Filmography as director ==
- Martha, Meet Frank, Daniel and Laurence (1998)
- Talk of Angels (1998)
- The Hole (2001)
- Godsend (2004)
- Killing Bono (2011)
- Rogue (2013–2016)
- Full Circle (2013–2016)
- Things You Shouldn't Say Past Midnight (2014)
- The Journey (2016)
- Driven (2018)
- Gigi & Nate (2022)
- William Tell (2024)
