= Gigi & Nate =

- Theatrical release poster
- Directed by: Nick Hamm
- Written by: David Hudgins
- Produced by: Rene Besson; Piers Tempest
- Starring: Marcia Gay Harden; Charlie Rowe; Josephine Langford; Zoe Colletti; Hannah Alligood; Jim Belushi; Diane Ladd
- Cinematography: Elliot Davis
- Edited by: Álex Rodríguez
- Music by: Paul Leonard-Morgan
- Production companies: Tempo Productions; Free Turn Entertainment
- Distributed by: Roadside Attractions
- Release date: September 2, 2022
- Running time: 114 minutes
- Country: United States
- Language: English
- Box office: $2.3 million

Gigi & Nate is a 2022 American coming-of-age drama film directed by Nick Hamm from a screenplay by David Hudgins. The film was loosely inspired by a book by Ellen Rogers, Kasey to the Rescue: The Remarkable Story of a Monkey and a Miracle. In 2006, Roger's disabled son worked with an organisation that paired monkeys with disabled people to provide help. The film was released in the United States on September 2, 2022, by Roadside Attractions.

== Plot ==
Nate Gibson collapses shortly after diving into a lake at his family's Fourth of July weekend party in their summer place in the fictional town of Happy Days, North Carolina. Rushing him to a local hospital, he is in such bad condition that his mother, Claire, insists that he be airlifted to one in Nashville, Tennessee.

There, they diagnose Nate with meningitis and the family is told his condition is likely terminal. His brain is swelling, causing him to have constant seizures. His big sister Katy sternly tells him he does not have permission to die.

Four years later, still living in Nashville, Nate has survived but is quadriplegic. He falls into a deep depression and tries to commit suicide. Claire contacts Cebus, an organization that trains animals to be service animals. They give Nate a capuchin named Gigi as an emotional support animal. She was rescued from a California petting zoo.

At the Gibsons' Gigi quickly accepts her new living space, but takes longer to come out and interact physically with Nate. Katy comes home from college and disapproves. The family dog Banjo gets loose, chasing Gigi and leaving the house a complete mess. Nate overhears Claire and his dad Dan argue over him and Gigi, so he says they might as well return her. To the surprise of Nate's caretakers, Gigi starts to help him with his rehabilitation exercises, giving him a pick-me-up.

As Gigi starts to accompany Nate on excursions into town, a local animal rights activist takes video footage of Gigi and Nate together at a local grocery store. Then he meets Lori again, the young woman he had met the day he had contracted meningitis. She invites them both to a college drinking party, and as he has a large Instagram following, a video taken there goes viral.

The animal rights group Americans For Animal Protection (AFAP) hold a protest outside the Gibsons' home, threatening to fight to make it illegal for capuchins to become service animals. They are granted a hearing to propose the ban. Despite Nate speaking up for the primates, the ruling goes in favor of AFAP 2–1, forcing him to give up Gigi.

As Nate's mother throws out Gigi's cage, his grandmother finds an article about North Carolina allowing capuchins as service animals. So, the family opts to move back there. A year later, during a Fourth of July barbecue at their new home, Nate reveals that he got a full-ride acceptance to a college that will allow him to use Gigi as his service animal.

== Cast ==
- Charlie Rowe as Nate Gibson
- Marcia Gay Harden as Claire Gibson, Nate's mother
- Josephine Langford as Katy Gibson, Nate's older sister
- Hannah Alligood as Annabelle Gibson, Nate's younger sister
- Jim Belushi as Dan Gibson, Nate's father
- Diane Ladd as Nate's grandmother
- Zoe Colletti as Lori
- Olly Sholotan as Benji Betts

== Production ==
Principal photography for Gigi & Nate began on March 29, 2021, in Los Angeles. In May 2021, it was reported that filming also took place in North Carolina and that Marcia Gay Harden, Charlie Rowe, Josephine Langford, Zoe Colletti, Hannah Alligood, Jim Belushi, and Diane Ladd would star. Filming concluded on May 29, 2021. The film was released on September 2, 2022.

== Reception ==
=== Box office ===
The film was released alongside Honk for Jesus. Save Your Soul. and made $990,279 from 1,184 theaters in its opening weekend, and a total of $1.3 million over the four-day Labor Day frame. 65% of the audience was female, 67% was over the age of 35, and 64% was white.

=== Critical response ===
On Rotten Tomatoes, the film holds an approval rating of 16% based on 31 reviews, with an average rating of 5.1/10. The website's critics consensus reads: "There's no denying Gigi & Nate's good intentions -- but it's also impossible to ignore this cloying drama's clunky execution." Metacritic assigned the film a weighted average score of 45 out of 100, based on seven critics, indicating "mixed or average" reviews. Audiences polled by PostTrak gave the film an 81% overall positive score, with 60% saying they would definitely recommend it.

==== Animal welfare concerns ====
The film was criticized by animal welfare groups such as Born Free USA and PETA for falsely portraying primates as service animals, inadvertently fueling the trade in pet monkeys. Born Free's Devan Schowe noted:

[S]cenes that convey moments of compassion and empathy towards Nate were largely filmed using the animated version of Gigi, while Allie, the real-life "actor" capuchin, appears in scenes that communicate aggression and frustration... [I]n order to tell the story the filmmakers want to tell – about the emotional connection between Nate and Gigi – the scenes of closeness between human and wild animal had to be fabricated using animation.
