= Alexis Petridis =

English music journalist (born 1971)

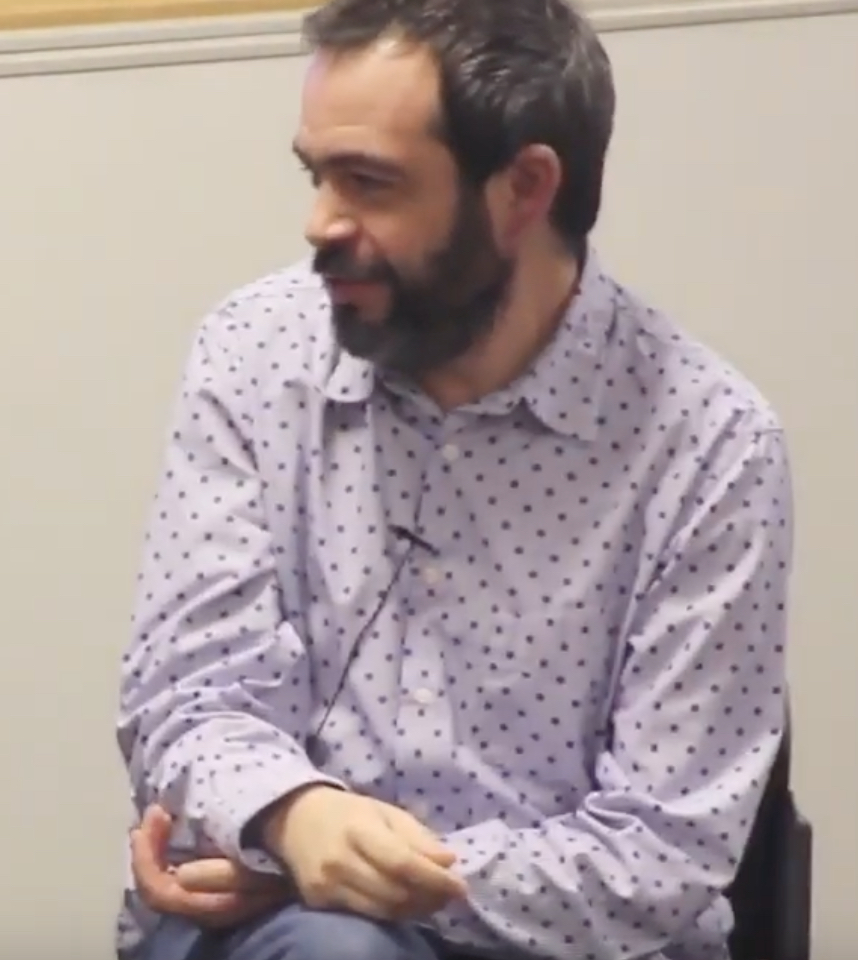
- Petridis in 2015
- Born: 13 September 1971 (age 54); Sunderland, England
- Education: University of Cambridge
- Occupations: Journalist; critic
- Employer: The Guardian

Alexis Petridis (born 13 September 1971) is an English pop culture journalist. He is the head rock and pop music critic of The Guardian, and a regular contributor to GQ. In addition to his music journalism for the paper, he has written a weekly column in the fashion section of The Guardian's Weekend section, as well as contributing to its Lost in Showbiz column.

Petridis was born to a family of Greek descent in Sunderland in the north of England, but grew up in Silsden, near Keighley in Yorkshire. The family later moved to Buckinghamshire. After studying at Dr Challoner's Grammar School in Amersham, he began his writing career at the University of Cambridge by contributing to the student newspaper Varsity.

Petridis has won the "Record Reviews Writer of the Year" category at the Record of the Day awards eight times, every year from 2005 to 2012, as well as winning "Artist and Music Features: Writer of the Year" in 2006 and "Best Music Writer" (as voted by students) in 2012. In 2017, he was awarded a Fellowship by Leeds College of Music.

He was the final editor of the now defunct music magazine Select. He was also the ghostwriter of Elton John's 2019 autobiography Me.
