= Dancing Queen (1993 film) =

1993 television film by Nick Hamm

- VHS cover
- Genre: Romantic comedy
- Written by: Nick Vivian
- Directed by: Nick Hamm
- Starring: Rik Mayall; Helena Bonham Carter
- Composer: Barrington Pheloung
- Country of origin: United Kingdom
- Original language: English

Production
- Producer: Andy Harries
- Cinematography: David Odd
- Editor: Martin Walsh
- Running time: 48 minutes
- Production companies: Granada Television; First Choice

Original release
- Network: Granada Television International
- Release: 3 June 1993

Dancing Queen is a 1993 British romantic comedy television film directed by Nick Hamm and starring Rik Mayall and Helena Bonham Carter. It follows the misfortune of Neil (Mayall), a bridegroom trying to get back to his bride with the help of his newfound friend Pandora/Julie (Bonham Carter), a stripper. The film originally aired on 3 June 1993 as the third episode of the first series of the Granada Television series Rik Mayall Presents.

== Plot ==
Neil is taken to his stag party by his friends Nigel and Donald. After spiking his drink, Nigel calls out for the stripper he paid, 'Pandora.' As she strips to Gary Glitter's "Do You Wanna Touch Me", Neil is feeling the immediate aftereffects of his spiked drink. After Pandora's dance, Nigel and Donald carry Neil out.

When Neil is woken, with a pounding headache, by an alarm clock strapped to his head he freaks out on finding he is travelling on a train and has a one-way ticket. He is sharing a compartment with a woman that he does not recognise as Pandora, who compliments him on his pants: his trousers are missing. Pandora tells him what the next station is, and that he has plenty of time to return to Maidstone. As the train slows at the station, Neil sees Nigel and Donald waiting for him with a banner, "WAKE UP NEIL". Neil relaxes until he realises that the train is an express and is not going to stop, much to the confusion of Nigel and Donald.

Neil gets off on the next stop, the fishing port Scarborough, alongside Pandora. She leaves him waiting for his friends. He doesn't know that Nigel and Donald have given up and are hoping that he'll return on his own. Nigel walks around town panicking and trying to get money to call friends to help him. He collapses on a beach where Pandora finds him. He suddenly remembers that she has money that Nigel paid her. He begs her to lend him the money so that he can call his bride. Pandora agrees to help him. Before lending him the money she tells him that her real name is Julie. Neil calls the house, but Sophie (his fiancée)'s grandmother inadvertently kicks and disconnects the phone cable on going to answer. In the meantime Julie has got some clothes for Neil. As she goes to buy them some food Neil starts attacking a phone booth out of frustration in front of some fisherman and a policeman. Neil begs the policeman to help him but the policeman thinks he's drunk. Julie comes over to Neil and the policeman asks her if she knows Neil. Neil urges her to explain his predicament but she makes it even worse. She tells the policeman he was drunk, she stripped for him, and she found him passed out on the beach with his trousers missing. As the policeman decides to ignore them Neil grows even more frustrated and knocks out Julie's offered food to the ground complaining that it's his wedding day. Julie throws it at him and calls him a selfish southern bastard before stalking off. Neil goes after her to apologise and thank her for her generosity. She forgives them and he resolves to try to forget about the wedding. Julie tells Neil about her brief, unsuccessful, marriage.

Neil accompanies Julie to see a televised horse race she had bet on. Her horse loses just as, in Maidstone, Nigel is telling Sophie that Neil will not be there for the wedding. Julie searches her bag for more money; a card falls out, Nigel's credit card, that Julie picked up after she stripped for them. She tells Neil that she wasn't going to use it, she just wanted Nigel to get in trouble.

Julie tells Neil she thinks she can get him the money for his ticket and to meet her at the Lighthouse Inn at 6:30, not before. Later Neil decides to use Nigel's card to get back home. He goes to buy a train ticket home but the last train is leaving at 6:25. Neil shows up at the Lighthouse Inn earlier than 6:30 to see Julie dancing to ABBA's "Dancing Queen for some men. She stops when she sees him and angrily asks him what he's doing there. Neil tells her he doesn't need the money because of Nigel's card. Julie hesitantly asks what time his train is and he replies that he missed it because he wanted to see her. He shows her the dress and shoes he bought for her and takes her for a romantic dinner by the sea. They dance intimately while Julie tells him how more fun his wedding night is compared to hers.

The next day Julie sees Neil off. Neil goes back to Sophie and finds her angry with him, blaming Neil for the fiasco and disbelieving that Nigel, who had given some explanation to Sophie's family, was responsible for the stripper and Neil's disappearance. He realises that he doesn't love her anyway and drives back to Scarborough, where he finds Julie dancing alone to "Dancing Queen" at the place where they had dined the previous night. They kiss through the glass windows after Neil tells her he's not married, and they drive off to Venice together.

== Cast ==
- Rik Mayall as Neil
- Helena Bonham Carter as Pandora/Julie
- Serena Gordon as Sophie
- Dorothy Tutin as Margaret
- Nathaniel Parker as Nigel
- Martin Clunes as Donald
- Bill Cashmore as policeman
- Judith Barker as ticket lady
- Peter Martin as ticket man
- Rosalie Williams as Lily
- Rod Arthur as ticket collector
- Tony Peers as taxi driver
- Philippa Howell as restaurant manageress

== Rik Mayall Presents... ==
Dancing Queen was one of three dramas in the first series of Granada TV's Rik Mayall Presents, which originally were broadcast by ITV Granada in 1993. In addition to Dancing Queen, director Nick Hamm was responsible for directing Micky Love, an episode about an aging television game show host who was convinced that a youth TV presenter was going to take over his broadcast slot. In addition to Mayall, Micky Love starred Jennifer Ehle, Eleanor Bron, William Roache and Peter Capaldi. In 1995, a second series of three films were made, with selected episodes from both series repeated by That's TV in June 2022.

== See also ==
- Staggered (film), a 1994 British comedy film that also follows the misfortune of a bridegroom trying to get back to his bride after a stag night, in which Martin Clunes also starred.
