= Papa Rao Biyyala =

Indian filmmaker and sports administrator

B.V.P Rao
- Born: Warangal, Telangana, India
- Occupations: Film maker, Former Advisor to Govt of Telangana, Former member IAS, Home Secretary Of Assam (1994–1997)

Biyyala Venkat Papa Rao (also known as B.V.P Rao) is an Indian film maker, a sports administrator and a former member of the Indian Administrative Service (IAS). His documentary short-length film Willing to Sacrifice won the National Film Award for Best Non-Feature Environment/Conservation/Preservation Film.

In March 2020, he resigned as a member of the governing body of Sports Authority of India (SAI). Rao is the brains behind the movement Clean Sports India which works on attempts to create a drug free sport.

Rao also worked for the United Nations for seven years to build post- war Governance and Peace in Kosovo. He is currently directing and producing feature films in India. His feature directorial film is titled as Music School, with Ilaiyaraaja as composer.

== Career ==
Policy Advisor to Government of Telangana

Papa Rao Biyyala joined the Telangana Government as the Policy Advisor in the rank of a Cabinet Minister in 2014 and continued to work for the government in the same position until 2019. He played a major role in all key policy initiatives of the new government of Telangana including the policy on investments which is named as “TSI Pass”.

Before Telangana was formed, Mr. Rao did strategic work to thrash out common positions of all Telangana political parties and lobbied with key political players in Delhi to achieve Telangana statehood.

United Nations

He joined the United Nations Mission in Kosovo (UNMIK) as Civil Affairs Officer in 1999 to pursue peace building in post conflict areas. As a part of this mission, he worked with the Orahovac municipality to protect the Serbian minorities in the area, immediately after the war when the angry Albanians were killings the Serbs. He successfully normalized the situation in a short period of time. United Nations then promoted him onto becoming the Principal International Officer in 2000 to set up and head the Ministry of Culture, Youth and Sports as part of Security Council mandate to develop Self- Governing institutions in Kosovo after the war.

In this 6-year tenure from 2000 to 2006, he spearheaded a reform programme of Sports Federations of Kosovo. This programme democratized the sports associations and organized several capacity building initiatives to enhance the transparent and efficient management of sports in Kosovo. He took up the case of Kosovo with International Olympic Committee for its recognition. Kosovo won its first Gold Medal in Rio Olympic Games in 2016.

Mr. Rao also had a unique opportunity in developing the Heritage Policy and legislation of Kosovo in the after math of destruction of about 100 mosques during the war and 100 churches in Post war times. He negotiated the most difficult agreement between Orthodox Serbian Church and Albanian Muslim dominated Kosovo government on restoration of damaged cultural properties. This arrangement is still working even after Kosovo got its Independence. During this time, UNESCO nominated two monuments from Kosovo as World Heritage Sites.

Indian Administrative Service

Joined Indian Administrative Service (IAS), the premier civil service of the country in 1982. He served in many important positions like the Deputy Commissioner of Jorhat District (1991-1993) and the Home Secretary of Assam (1994-1997).

As the Deputy Commissioner of Jorhat District, he was responsible for the overall civil administration and governance of the district with a population of about 1 million. He coordinated the police and military forces at the district level in their operations against militants by constantly monitoring them to ensure protection of human rights. In 1992, he also helped the rehabilitation of about 500 families whose houses were washed away by river erosion, with an integrated approach of providing land, house building allowance, creation of infrastructure like roads, school, water and electricity creating a new village in a record time of nine months.

While he was the Home Secretary of Assam, Mr. Rao analyzed intelligence reports of the insurgency ridden state every day and advised the Chief Minister on policy and strategy of prevention of outbreak of violence and maintaining public order. They also implemented a statewide demobilization and rehabilitation program for the ex-combatants of United Liberation of Front of Assam (ULFA), Bodo Liberation Tigers (BLTF) and other militants’ groups, which provided surrender of weapons and a package of training and financing of self-employment. About 10000 ex combatants were demolished with surrender of weapons and majority of them were rehabilitated through self-employment during this period. Mr. Rao took a voluntary retirement from Indian Administrative Service in 2005 to continue his career in peace building in post conflict areas.

Sports Administrator and Reformist

Papa Rao Biyyala commonly known as Mr. B.V.P Rao among the sports industry was a sports person himself who participated in over half a dozen sports in school and college days. He also represented India in Equestrian sport. He was in the Indian Tent Pegging Team for 5 years from 1985 to 1990.

Mr. Rao worked for Sports Authority of India for five years from 1984 to 1989 during which he had conceived and implemented a major talent hunt programme called “Special Area Games” through which raw sport talent from remote and tribal areas of the country were identified and nurtured. The scheme is one of the most successful talent identifications and nurturing programmes of India, which produced several Olympians including ace archer Limba Ram. This scheme is the most successful programme of Sports Authority of India in the last three decades. His work was embodied in a film called “Quest for Gold” which was made by a Mumbai based private company called Professional Management Group. It was one of the first film that a private company made a six-part serial and telecasted on a government scheme/work.

He further did a Post Graduate Diploma in Olympic Studies at the International Olympic Academy, Greece. Through this course, he specialized in Olympics Bid Analysis. Mr. Rao along with several Olympians formed an NGO called Clean Sports India to bring transparency and accountability in Sports Associations by engaging former sports persons. This NGO also aims to promote drug free sports.
