= Adam Murray (choreographer) =

British choreographer

Adam Murray is a British choreographer, known for his work in film and theatre. His credits include Rocketman, Cruella, The King's Man and the Curve production of Evita.

== Career ==
Earlier in his career, Murray was an original cast member of the West End production of Wicked and later worked as the production's UK associate choreographer.

In 2011, Murray choreographed the London production of Stand Tall – A Rock Musical at the Landor Theatre. He later choreographed Steven Spielberg's 2018 science-fiction film Ready Player One.

Murray choreographed the 2019 musical biographical film Rocketman, directed by Dexter Fletcher and starring Taron Egerton as Elton John. Murray worked with Fletcher and Egerton to develop movement for the film's musical sequences, which combined choreography with elements of fantasy and biographical storytelling. Variety reported that Murray's choreography also influenced the film's production design, with production designer Marcus Rowland saying that it had a significant bearing on the sets and visual style. A review in the Washington Blade credited Murray's choreography in the opening sequence, "The Bitch Is Back", with helping establish the film's blurring of reality and fantasy.

Reviews singled out the film's musical staging. Andrew Parker of The Gate credited Murray's choreography, alongside the cinematography, production design and costumes, with giving the sequences their scale and impact. GQ likewise identified the musical numbers as the moments when the film most fully came alive.

Following Rocketman, Murray worked on the films Cruella and The King's Man. In 2021, he joined the production of the Hindi- and Telugu-language musical film Music School as a choreographer.

In 2023, Murray choreographed a production of Evita at the Curve in Leicester. His choreography combined elements of tango, military movement, and naturalistic movement. Reviews of the production praised his work: East Midlands Theatre described the choreography as "exquisite", particularly noting its combination of dance and marching in "And the Money Kept Rolling In", while The Theatre Talk said the ensemble had been "expertly choreographed" and credited the movement with sustaining the production's energy and bringing new life to the score.
