= Charlie Rowe =

English actor (born 1996)

- Born: Charlie John Rowe; 23 April 1996 (age 30); Islington, London, England
- Occupation: Actor
- Years active: 2002–present

Charlie John Rowe (born 23 April 1996) is an English actor and musician. His film roles include Young Tommy in Never Let Me Go, James in The Boat That Rocked, Billy Costa in The Golden Compass, Peter in the SyFy/Sky Movies Peter Pan prequel Neverland, and played Leo Roth on the Fox medical comedy-drama series Red Band Society. He’s most notable for playing the character of “Nate” in the film that was “Gigi and Nate”, which details the friendship of a quadriplegic and a monkey.

== Life and career ==
Rowe was born on 23 April 1996 in Islington, London, and grew up with a sister in Crouch End. He attended St Michael's Primary School, Highgate. His mother, Sara, is a drama teacher, and his father, Chris Rowe, is an actor and writer.

He got his start in the 2007 fantasy adventure film The Golden Compass and continued to make films throughout his young years, like SyFy's Neverland. His aunt is the English actress Claire Price, known from the drama television series Rebus.

In 2015, Rowe was among the front runners for the role of Spider-Man in Captain America: Civil War alongside Asa Butterfield, Charlie Plummer and Tom Holland; Holland landed the role.

From 2017–2018 Rowe starred in the American TV series Salvation (Season 1 and 2) as Liam Cole, a scientist attempting to divert an asteroid from hitting and destroying life on Earth.

== Filmography ==
=== Film ===
Year	Title	Role	Notes
2007	The Golden Compass	Billy Costa	
2009	The Boat That Rocked	James	
2010	Never Let Me Go	Young Tommy	
2010	The Nutcracker in 3D	The Prince / Nicholas Charles	
2010	Disco	Greg	Short film
2013	Walking with Dinosaurs	Ricky	
2019	Rocketman	Ray Williams	
2020	The Forgotten C	Jaime	Short film
2022	Gigi & Nate	Nate Gibson	
2025	Jay Kelly	Young Jay Kelly	

=== Television ===
Year	Title	Role	Notes
2006	Jackanory	Joe Jefferson	Episode: "Muddle Earth"
2006	Robin Hood	Young Robin Hood	Episode: "Bad Blood"
2011	Neverland	Peter	Miniseries; 2 episodes
2014	The Secrets	Alec	Miniseries; episode: "The Visitor"
2014–2015	Red Band Society	Leo Roth	Main cast; 13 episodes
2017–2018	Salvation	Liam Cole	Main cast; 26 episodes
2018	Vanity Fair	George Osborne	Miniseries; 5 episodes
2022	Angelyne	Freddy Messina	Miniseries; 4 episodes
2023	Slow Horses	Ben Dunn	5 episodes
2024	Wolf Hall: The Mirror and the Light	Gregory Cromwell	
