= Ray Williams (producer) =

- Born: London, England
- Occupations: Producer, publicist, entrepreneur
- Years active: 1965–present
- Label: Crumbs Productions Ltd.
- Website: www.crumbsmusic.com

Ray Williams is a British A&R music producer and publisher. He discovered Elton John and introduced him to Bernie Taupin. Williams has been a prominent figure of the music and film industry for many years as a press agent, A&R head, artist manager, film music producer, and publisher. He was the music supervisor of films including The Last Emperor, Absolute Beginners, and Naked Lunch.

== 1960s ==
During the 1960s, Williams worked with Cathy McGowan, who presented Ready Steady Go! He was also a press agent for a number of major artists such as Sonny & Cher, Cream, Robert Stigwood, and for Brian Epstein's Saville Theatre. He eventually moved up to head the A&R department for Liberty Records, where he signed upcoming artists who went on to achieve major successes with Jeff Lynne (Idle Race, ELO), The Bonzo Dog Doo-Dah Band and Mike Batt, among others.

In 1967, he discovered Elton John and introduced him to lyricist Bernie Taupin. Williams managed Elton John for his first five albums. He also launched and managed Stealers Wheel (Gerry Rafferty) and the Blues Band.

== Later work ==
Since 1984, Williams has also been one of Europe's leading film and television music producers. Williams was the music supervisor of The Last Emperor, Absolute Beginners and Naked Lunch. His credits include Bernardo Bertolucci's The Last Emperor (1988), which collected the Academy Award, Golden Globe Award, Grammy and the L.A. film critics' award for best score and The Sheltering Sky (1990), which won the Golden Globe and L.A. film critics' award.

The year 1996 brought more success as Williams produced the soundtrack for Lars Von Trier's Breaking The Waves, a winner of the Grand Prix Award at Cannes and an Academy Award nomination in Hollywood.

From 1997 to 2002, Williams went on to produce and supervise several soundtracks including Saving Grace, the film which won Sundance Festival Best Film Award, and Dancer in the Dark, Lars Von Trier's film starring Björk, which went on to win the coveted Palme d'Or Award for best film at the Cannes Film Festival.

During this period, Williams was instrumental in the acquisition of Bill Lowery's Atlanta-based Lowery Music Publishing Group for Sony Music Entertainment. The catalogue included the songs "Be-Bop-a-Lula", "Young Love" and "Rose Garden". He was appointed as Sony's consultant for three years to oversee the transition of the business.

Williams runs his own music publishing/production company, Crumbs Music based out of Raleigh, North Carolina and continues to sign new artists, composers, and catalogues. His latest project on Crumbs-The Label is Ali Campbell's album Running Free featuring Smokey Robinson, Katie Melua, Lemar, Beverley Knight, Robin Campbell, and Bitty McLean. In 2009, Ray and Crumbs Music UK organized the music content for the 50th anniversary of the mini automobile. The Festival included performances by Paul Weller, Calvin Harris, Twisted Wheel and Raygun. In 2014, Ray created Crumbs Music INC to develop his pre-cleared music licensing website. His latest project on Crumbs focuses on revitalizing the film industry in North Carolina by highlighting new and emerging artists with placements in film, TV, and advertising.

== In media ==
In 2019, Williams was portrayed by actor Charlie Rowe in the film Rocketman (he noted the film "mixed up all the stories" of what actually happened).
