= Rocketman (film) =

2019 film by Dexter Fletcher

- UK theatrical release poster
- Directed by: Dexter Fletcher
- Written by: Lee Hall
- Produced by: Adam Bohling; David Furnish; David Reid; Matthew Vaughn
- Starring: Taron Egerton; Jamie Bell; Richard Madden; Bryce Dallas Howard
- Cinematography: George Richmond
- Edited by: Chris Dickens
- Music by: Matthew Margeson
- Production companies: New Republic Pictures; Marv Films; Rocket Pictures
- Distributed by: Paramount Pictures
- Release dates: 16 May 2019 (Cannes); 22 May 2019 (United Kingdom); 31 May 2019 (United States)
- Running time: 121 minutes
- Countries: United Kingdom; United States
- Language: English
- Budget: $40 million
- Box office: $195.3 million

Rocketman is a 2019 jukebox musical film based on the life, music, and career of British musician Elton John. The biographical film focuses on the story of John in his early days in England as a prodigy at the Royal Academy of Music through his musical partnership with Bernie Taupin, telling his story through his music. The film is titled after John's 1972 song "Rocket Man". Directed by Dexter Fletcher and written by Lee Hall, the film stars Taron Egerton as John, with Jamie Bell as Taupin, Richard Madden as John Reid, and Bryce Dallas Howard as Sheila Eileen, John's mother. A British-American venture, the film was produced by New Republic Pictures, Marv Films and Rocket Pictures, and was distributed by Paramount Pictures.

The film had been in development since the 2000s before it was announced in 2013 that Focus Features acquired the rights to the film and director Michael Gracey (who eventually served as executive producer) was attached to direct the film with actor Tom Hardy set to star. After both Hardy and Gracey left the project following creative differences between Focus and John that halted an initial production start in autumn 2014, the project languished for several years until Paramount Pictures and New Republic Pictures took over as distributor in April 2018, where Egerton and Fletcher signed on. Principal photography began in August 2018 and was completed later that year. John served as executive producer, while his husband David Furnish produced the film through their Rocket Pictures, alongside Matthew Vaughn's Marv Films.

Rocketman premiered at the Cannes Film Festival on 16 May 2019, and was theatrically released in the United Kingdom on 22 May 2019 and in the United States on 31 May 2019. It grossed $195 million worldwide against its $40 million budget and received a positive critical reception, with praise for Egerton's performance. The film was the first by a major studio to include a gay male sex scene. For his performance, Egerton received numerous nominations, including the BAFTA Award for Best Actor in a Leading Role and Screen Actors Guild Award for Outstanding Performance by a Male Actor in a Leading Role, and won the Golden Globe Award for Best Actor – Motion Picture Musical or Comedy. John and Taupin also won Best Original Song at the 77th Golden Globe Awards, Best Song at the 25th Critics' Choice Awards, and Best Original Song at the 92nd Academy Awards for "(I'm Gonna) Love Me Again", and earned four nominations at the 73rd British Academy Film Awards, including Outstanding British Film.

== Plot ==
Dressed in a flamboyant devil's outfit, Elton John enters an addiction rehabilitation session, recounting his life in a series of flashbacks ("The Bitch Is Back").

Shy boy Reginald Dwight grows up in the suburbs of 1950s Britain, raised by his unaffectionate mother, Sheila, and his more loving grandmother, Ivy. He is interested in music and hopes to perform for his father, Stanley, who takes no interest in him ("I Want Love"). Reginald begins piano lessons, making his way into the Royal Academy of Music. Stanley abandons his family after Sheila has an affair. Soon after, her lover, Fred, moves in with the family, and he introduces young Reginald to rock music. He grows up idolizing rock musicians and begins performing in local pubs ("Saturday Night's Alright for Fighting"). As an adult, Reginald joins the band Bluesology, which is hired to play backup for touring American bands the Isley Brothers and Patti LaBelle and the Blue Belles. Ronald Isley recommends that he write songs and put his old life behind him to become a famous artist. Reginald changes his name to Elton John, taking his first name from Elton Dean, the saxophonist of Bluesology, and "John" from John Lennon.

Elton writes music and tries to find success with Dick James' record label DJM Records under the management of Ray Williams. Williams introduces Elton to lyricist Bernie Taupin; they become friends and move into a flat to compose their songs. When Elton admits he is homosexual, he ends his romantic relationship with their landlady, so they are evicted. Elton and Bernie move in with Elton's grandmother, his mother, and Fred, where they continue writing and create "Your Song". James sets up a performance for them at the Troubadour in Los Angeles. Elton is nervous before his debut, but the audience embraces his performance ("Crocodile Rock").

Elton's success overjoys him, but he feels abandoned when Bernie leaves him at a party to spend time with a woman ("Tiny Dancer"). He is approached by music manager John Reid and, after hitting it off, they have sex. Reid's influence launches Elton into a downward spiral of a life of debauchery, while his career rises to new heights ("Honky Cat"). He develops a flamboyant stage persona and becomes one of the most successful and iconic figures in rock and roll of the 1970s. Reid becomes Elton's manager and insists Elton tell his parents he is gay, so he reconnects with his father, who displays no interest in him. Distraught, Elton calls his mother to tell her he is gay. She already knew, but says he will be forever unloved. Devastated by his parents' rejection, as well as Reid's increasing physical and emotional abuse, Elton becomes addicted to alcohol, cocaine, cannabis, shopping, and sex. His addictions, mood swings, and short temper alienate his friends ("Pinball Wizard"). Elton catches Reid cheating on him and ends their relationship, but Reid continues as his manager. During a party, he overdoses on pills and attempts suicide by jumping into his pool. He is rushed to the hospital, then thrust on stage at Dodger Stadium to perform ("Rocket Man").

Elton descends further into a life of drugs, alcohol, and loneliness ("Bennie and the Jets"). He has a short-lived marriage with close female friend Renate Blauel, but his homosexuality dooms their relationship ("Don't Let the Sun Go Down on Me"). He falls out with his mother and Bernie ("Sorry Seems to Be the Hardest Word"). Elton's dependence on prescription pills and alcohol results in a heart attack. Realizing his life is out of control, Elton leaves a concert without warning and checks into a rehab center ("Goodbye Yellow Brick Road").

Elton realizes he no longer needs approval from his parents or Reid. He also rekindles his friendship with Bernie, who brings him new lyrics. Elton is worried that he cannot perform or compose without alcohol or drugs, but writes "I'm Still Standing" and returns to a successful career.

Title cards state that Elton has been sober for over 28 years. He remains good friends and song-writing partners with Bernie and is happily married to David Furnish, with whom he has two children.

== Cast ==
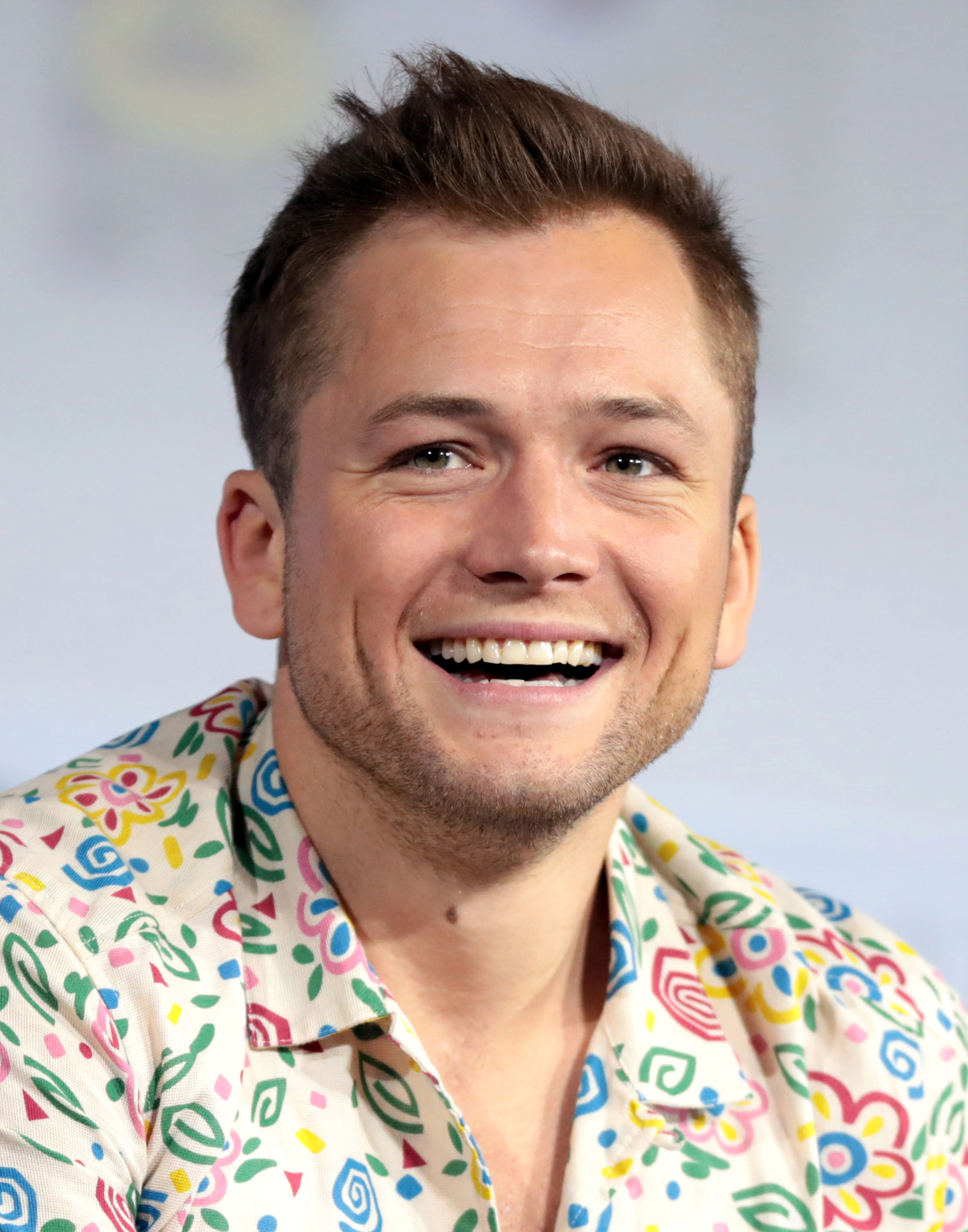
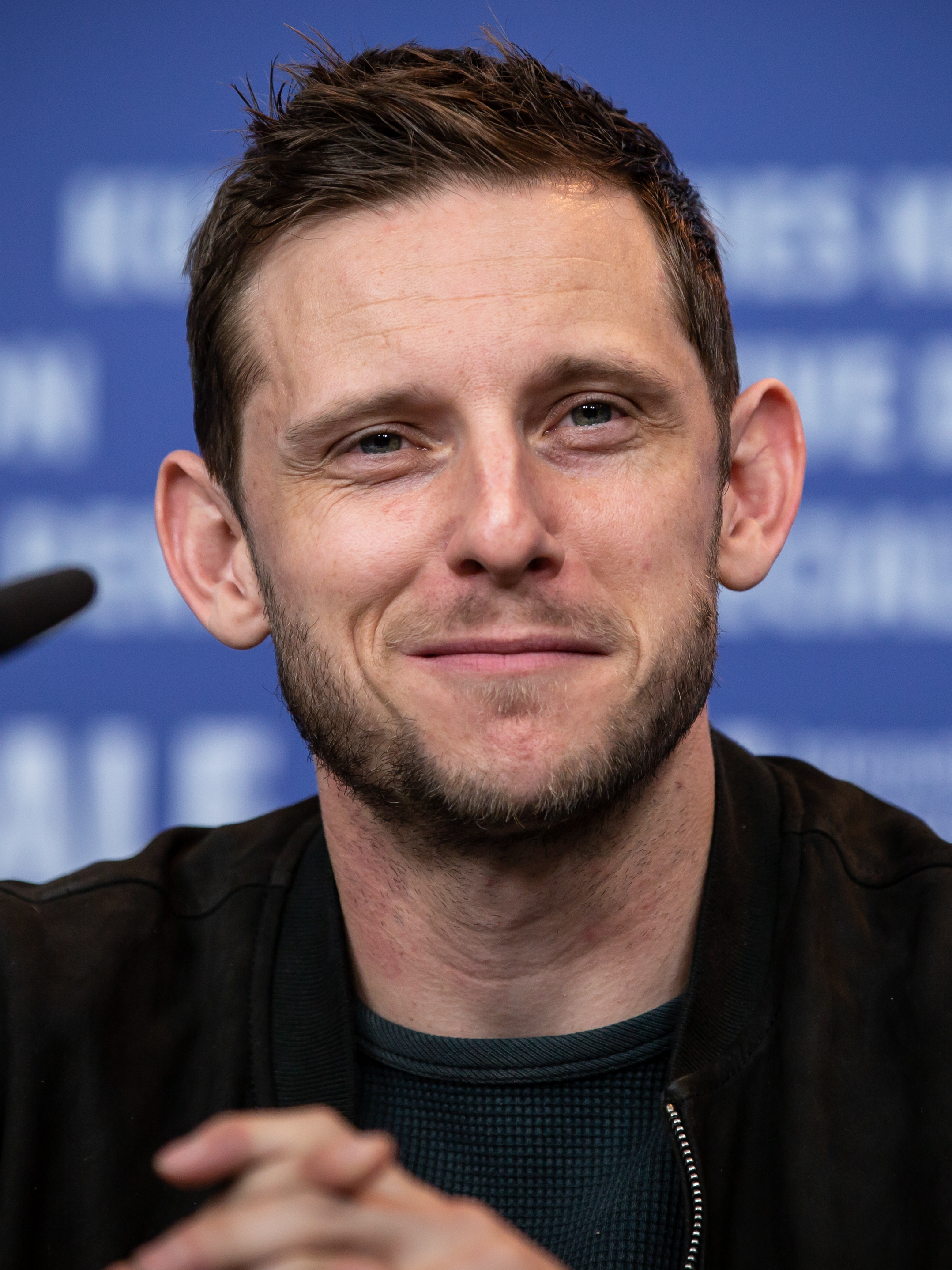
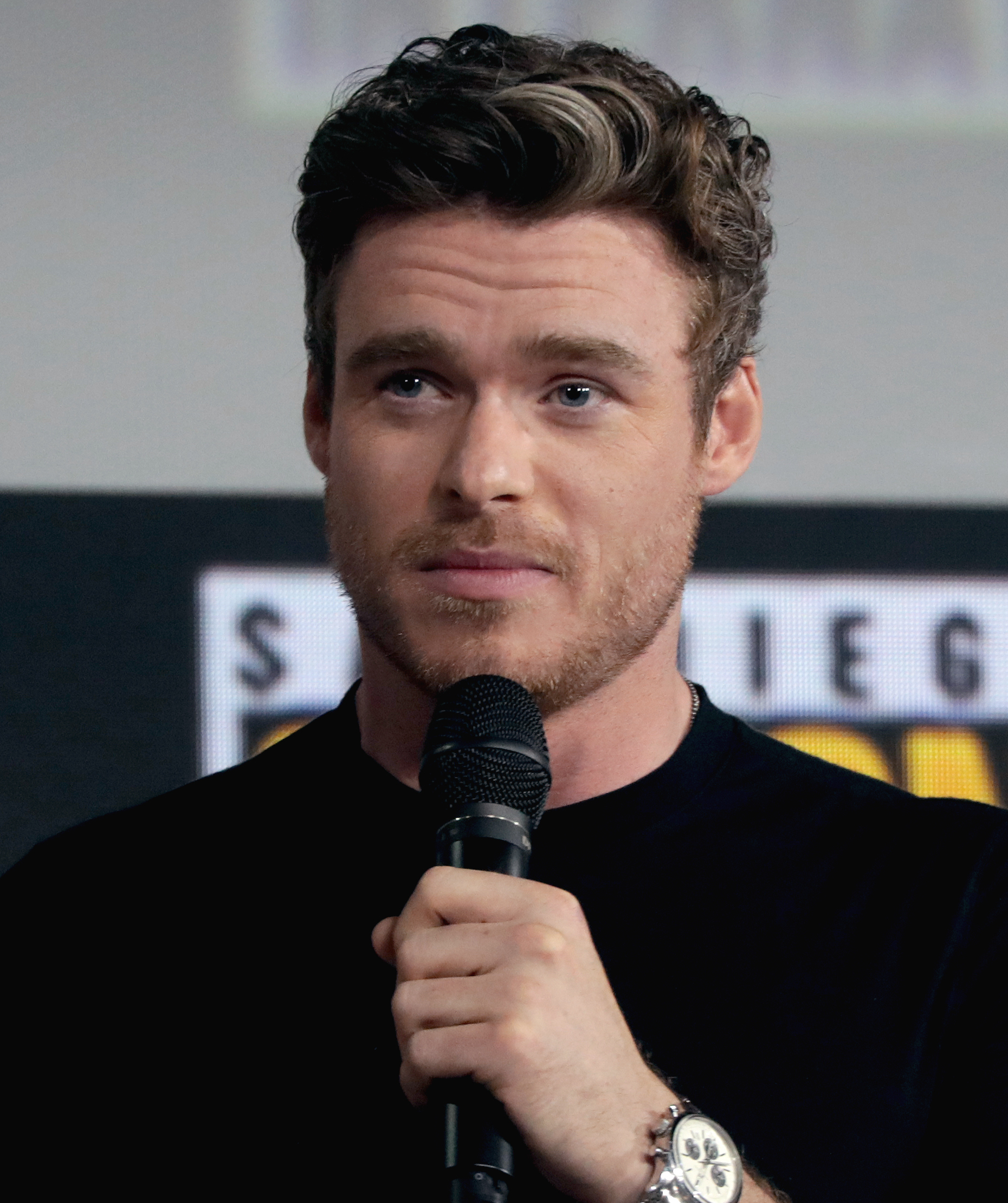
Taron Egerton, Jamie Bell and Richard Madden (left to right) play Elton John, Bernie Taupin and John Reid, respectively.
- Taron Egerton as Elton John (Reginald Dwight)
  - Matthew Illesley as young Reginald Dwight
  - Kit Connor as teenage Reginald Dwight
- Jamie Bell as Bernie Taupin
- Richard Madden as John Reid
- Bryce Dallas Howard as Sheila Dwight
- Gemma Jones as Ivy, Elton's grandmother
- Stephen Graham as Dick James
- Steven Mackintosh as Stanley Dwight
- Tate Donovan as Doug Weston
- Charlie Rowe as Ray Williams
- Tom Bennett as Fred, Sheila's boyfriend
- Keith Lemon as a retail worker
- Rachel Muldoon as singer Kiki Dee
- Ophelia Lovibond as Arabella (Elton's girlfriend)
- Celinde Schoenmaker as Renate Blauel (Elton's wife)
- Max Croes as Parkland Patient

== Production ==
=== Development ===
Elton John and husband David Furnish tried to produce a film based on his life for almost two decades. The earliest efforts dated back to the 2000s, when development started at Walt Disney Pictures. Photographer David LaChapelle was set to direct the film after his work on the video for John's 2001 single, "This Train Don't Stop There Anymore", which featured Justin Timberlake as a young John. However, the project languished for nearly two decades. In an article written for The Guardian, John said that he struggled to get the film off the ground due to studios wanting it to be toned down to a PG-13 rating instead of an R.

In January 2012, John announced that he had named Justin Timberlake as his top choice to play him in the film. Lee Hall was set to pen the screenplay. In March 2013, Michael Gracey was hired to direct, with Tom Hardy cast in October to play John and FilmDistrict (and later Focus Features) acquiring the U.S. distribution rights. Filming was initially planned to start in autumn 2014. However, creative differences between John and Focus, along with budget issues, led him and Furnish to take the project elsewhere.

In July 2017, it was announced that Hardy was no longer involved, and Taron Egerton entered negotiations to replace him. While editing Kingsman: The Golden Circle, Matthew Vaughn learned about the project and took interest in producing the film on the condition that Egerton played John. Vaughn then picked Dexter Fletcher, who had replaced Bryan Singer during the production of the Queen biopic Bohemian Rhapsody, to direct the film since Gracey was busy with The Greatest Showman and was later credited as one of the executive producers on the film. The producers then filmed a sequence of Egerton as John performing two of John's songs, and presented it to Jim Gianopulos, who had worked with Vaughn on the Kingsman franchise at 20th Century Fox and was now the CEO of Paramount Pictures. Paramount and New Republic Pictures agreed to finance the film in exchange for worldwide distribution rights. It was reported that Egerton would sing the songs in the film himself, produced by Giles Martin, who was brought on as music producer for the project. In an interview at CinemaCon, Egerton stated the film would be a lot more of a visually stylised epic musical-fantasy rather than just a traditional straightforward biopic.

In December 2019, Corriere della Sera reported that the film was partly financed by Centurion Global Fund, a Malta-based firm supported by the Holy See. The paper claimed that a Vatican inquiry into Peter's Pence allocations uncovered a €1 million donation from Centurion to assist with the film's production.

=== Casting ===
In April 2018, Taron Egerton was officially cast to play the musician in the film. Egerton had previously appeared with John in the 2017 film Kingsman: The Golden Circle, and Egerton, as Johnny the Gorilla, sang John's song "I'm Still Standing" in the 2016 animated film Sing. In June, the role of Bernie Taupin was given to Jamie Bell. In July, Richard Madden entered negotiations to play John Reid, and Bryce Dallas Howard was cast to play John's mother. Gemma Jones was announced as being cast in the film in October.

=== Filming ===
Production began on 2 August 2018. In October 2018, it was announced the film was shooting in London. Filming commenced at Bray Film Studios near Maidenhead, Berkshire. Additional filming occurred at Pinewood Studios and Shepperton Studios.

Choreographer Adam Murray choreographed the film's musical sequences. Production designer Marcus Rowland said Murray's choreography had an influence on the film's sets.

=== Music ===
The soundtrack for the film was released by Virgin EMI (UK) and Interscope Records (US) on CD and digital formats on 24 May 2019 and was also released by Interscope Records on vinyl on August 23, 2019. The album contains 22 tracks of several hits performed by the cast of the film and a newly written award-winning track "(I'm Gonna) Love Me Again" featuring vocals by Taron Egerton and Elton John together.

A commercial success in terms of sales, the soundtrack reached the Top 40 chart level in multiple countries such as Australia, Switzerland, and the United States, including the production's own United Kingdom.

== Release ==
Rocketman had its world premiere at the Cannes Film Festival on 16 May 2019, and was theatrically released in the United Kingdom on 22 May 2019. The film was initially scheduled to be released in the United States on 17 May 2019, but was pushed back to 31 May 2019.

Rocketman was released on Digital HD on 6 August 2019 and on DVD, Blu-ray, and 4K Ultra HD on 27 August 2019.

== Censorship ==
In March 2019, it was reported that Paramount Pictures was pressuring director Dexter Fletcher and producer Matthew Vaughn to cut a sex scene between Taron Egerton and Richard Madden, so that the film could receive a PG-13 rating in the United States, as influenced by the financial success of Bohemian Rhapsody the year prior. Fletcher denied the reports, saying that the movie "has and always will be the no holds barred, musical fantasy that Paramount and producers passionately support and believe in" and said the allegations were "nothing but rumours".

In Russia, where the film was released on 6 June 2019, about five minutes of footage were removed from the final cut. Central Partnership, the film's Russian distributor, removed all scenes involving homosexuality and drugs, a move that was criticised by both John and Paramount. The film was censored in Malaysia, sparking condemnation from art critics that the country was becoming a "nanny state". Safaruddin Mohammad Ali, the head of the country's Film Censorship Board, said "We do not allow any scenes that promote LGBTQ in films that are for public viewing", adding that "Although it is about the real life of Elton John, it is not for him to allow the public to see whatever he does or whatever activities he indulges in that is not our culture".

The film was banned in Samoa, a conservative Christian nation. Principal Censor Leiataua Niuapu, of the country's Censorship Board, explained: "It's a good story, in that it's about an individual trying to move on in life. He [John] went through a difficult family life and managed to move on and become very successful. But there are acts that are not good for public viewing and against the law." The film was also banned in Egypt, where John himself was banned from visiting back in 2010. The reason given was his "anti-religious sentiments", though Film Stories journalist Simon Brew argued that the ban "seemed pretty clear it was more to do with [John's] sexuality".

In October 2019, Entertainment Weekly digital director Shana Krochmal accused Delta Air Lines of removing "almost every reference" to John's sexuality in the version of the film shown on the airline, including scenes of kissing and gay sex. In response, a Delta spokesperson said that "Delta's content parameters do not in any way ask for the removal of homosexual content from the film" and that "We value diversity and inclusion as core to our culture and our mission and will review our processes to ensure edited video content doesn't conflict with these values".

== Reception ==
=== Box office ===
Rocketman grossed $96.4 million in the United States and Canada, and $98.8 million in other territories, for a worldwide total of $195.2 million, against a production budget of $40 million.

In the United States and Canada, the film was released alongside Godzilla: King of the Monsters and Ma, and was projected to gross $20–25 million from 3,610 theaters in its opening weekend. The film made $9.2 million on its first day, including $1.8 million from Thursday night previews and including and $580,000 from its 18 May paid-advanced Fandango screenings, for a preview total of $2.3 million. It went on to debut to $25.7 million, finishing third, behind Godzilla: King of the Monsters and Aladdin. The film dropped 46% in its second weekend to $14 million, finishing in fifth, and then made $9.4 million in its third weekend, climbing to the fourth position.

In the United Kingdom, it debuted to $6.4 million, finishing second behind fellow new release Aladdin. The following week, the film was projected to gross around $20 million from the international markets it was released in alongside the U.S., and ended up making $19.2 million from 39 non-U.S. countries over the weekend.

=== Critical response ===
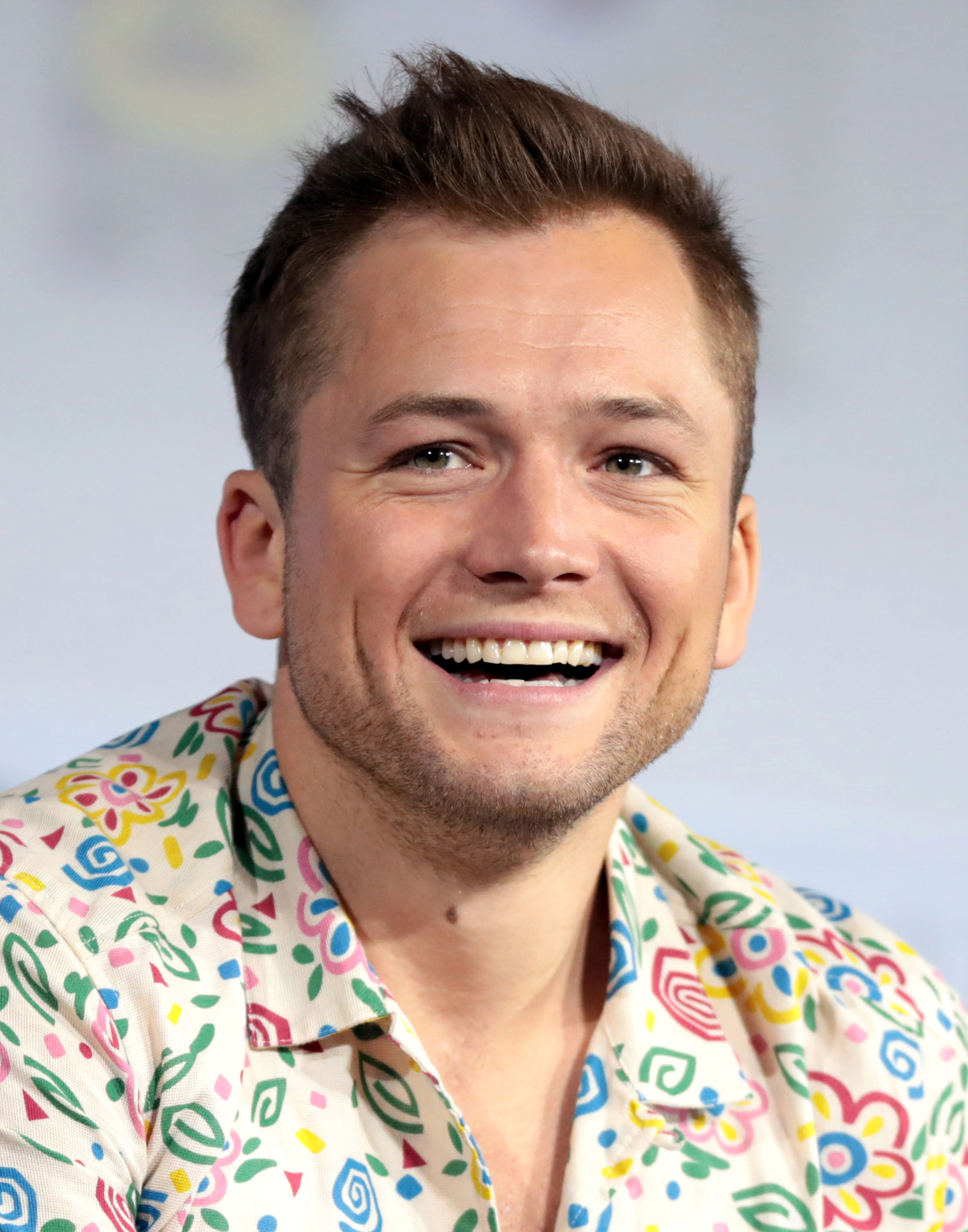
Taron Egerton's performance as Elton John garnered widespread acclaim from critics and audiences, as well as from John himself.

Rocketman received a largely positive response from critics, with some calling it one of the best films released in 2019, as well as being considered the best reviewed musical movie of the year and one of the best reviewed British releases of the year, praising Egerton's acting and vocal performance, the costume design, soundtrack, and the musical sequences. On the review aggregator website Rotten Tomatoes, the film holds an approval rating of 89% based on 401 reviews, with an average rating of 7.6/10. The website's critics consensus reads: "It's going to be a long, long time before a rock biopic manages to capture the highs and lows of an artist's life like Rocketman." On Metacritic, it has a weighted average score of 69 out of 100, based on 49 critics, indicating "generally favorable reviews". Audiences polled by CinemaScore gave the film an average grade of "A−" on an A+ to F scale, while those at PostTrak gave it an average 4 out of 5 stars and a 69% "definite recommend".

At its Cannes Film Festival premiere, the film received a standing ovation. It also received a standing ovation from Oscar voters at the academy screening. Steve Pond of TheWrap said, "It's all grand and fun and corny; a musical fantasy that reaches for the sky and gets there often enough to make it diverting." The Guardian's Peter Bradshaw gave the film three stars out of five, saying Egerton performed a "good impression of the flamboyant musician," and writing, "Rocketman is an honest, heartfelt tribute to Elton John's music and his public image." In the same newspaper, Mark Kermode gave the film five stars, writing that "Fletcher is the real star of this show, a director whose enthusiasm for musical storytelling shines through every frame." Chicago Sun-Times critic Richard Roeper also greatly enjoyed the film, giving it three-and-a-half stars out of four and praising its "almost documentary-level eye for detail when it comes to re-creating historic chapters such as the sold-out shows at Dodger Stadium in 1975 when Elton wore a sequined Dodgers uniform and belted out one hit after another to the adoring masses."

Christy Lemire of RogerEbert.com had mixed feelings about Rocketman, awarding it two-and-a-half stars out of four and stating that the film is a "formulaic, paint-by-numbers biopic."

=== Accolades ===
Year	Award	Category	Recipient(s)	Result	Ref.
2019	Cannes Film Festival	Queer Palm	Dexter Fletcher	Nominated	
2020	Academy Awards	Best Original Song	Elton John and Bernie Taupin for "(I'm Gonna) Love Me Again"	Won	
2020	Apolo Awards	Best Hair and Make-Up	Elizabeth Yianni-Georgiou, Tapio Salmi and Barrie Gower	Nominated	
2020	Golden Globe Awards	Best Motion Picture – Musical or Comedy	Rocketman	Nominated	
2020	Golden Globe Awards	Best Actor – Motion Picture Musical or Comedy	Taron Egerton	Won	
2020	Golden Globe Awards	Best Original Song	Elton John and Bernie Taupin for "(I'm Gonna) Love Me Again"	Won	
2020	Screen Actors Guild Awards	Outstanding Actor in a Leading Role	Taron Egerton	Nominated	
2020	Grammy Awards	Best Compilation Soundtrack for Visual Media	Rocketman	Nominated	
2020	British Academy Film Awards	Outstanding British Film	Dexter Fletcher, Adam Bohling, David Furnish, David Reid, Matthew Vaughn, and Lee Hall	Nominated	
2020	British Academy Film Awards	Best Actor in a Leading Role	Taron Egerton	Nominated	
2020	British Academy Film Awards	Best Makeup and Hair	Lizzie Yianni-Georgiou	Nominated	
2020	British Academy Film Awards	Best Sound	Matthew Collinge, John Hayes, Mike Prestwood Smith, and Danny Sheehan	Nominated	
2020	Critics' Choice Movie Award	Best Hair And Makeup	Rocketman	Nominated	
2020	Critics' Choice Movie Award	Best Costume Design	Julian Day	Nominated	
2020	Critics' Choice Movie Award	Best Song	Elton John and Bernie Taupin for "(I'm Gonna) Love Me Again"	Won (Note: Tied with "Glasgow (No Place Like Home)" from Wild Rose.)	
2019	LA Online Film Critics Society	Midseason Awards: Best Actor	Taron Egerton	Won	
2019	Teen Choice Awards	Choice Movie Actor: Drama	Taron Egerton	Nominated	
2019	GQ Awards	Actor of the Year	Taron Egerton	Won	
2019	Attitude Film Awards	Film Award	Taron Egerton	Won	
2019	Hollywood Film Awards	Breakthrough Actor Award	Taron Egerton	Won	
2019	Hollywood Film Awards	Make-Up & Hair Styling Award	Lizzie Yianni-Georgiou, Tapio Salmi and Barrie Gower	Won	
2019	People's Choice Awards	Drama Movie Star of the Year	Taron Egerton	Nominated	
2019	People's Choice Awards	Drama Movie	Rocketman	Nominated	
2019	Hollywood Music in Media Awards	Best Original Song – Feature Film	Elton John and Bernie Taupin for "(I'm Gonna) Love Me Again"	Nominated	
2019	Screen Awards	Theatrical Campaign of the Year	Paramount UK	Won	
2019	Satellite Awards	Best Motion Picture – Comedy/Musical	Rocketman	Nominated	
2019	Satellite Awards	Best Actor – Motion Picture Comedy/Musical	Taron Egerton	Won	
2019	Satellite Awards	Best Costume Design	Julian Day	Nominated	
2019	Satellite Awards	Best Cinematography	George Richmond	Nominated	
2019	Satellite Awards	Best Film Editing	Chris Dickens	Nominated	
2019	Satellite Awards	Best Original Song	Elton John and Bernie Taupin for "(I'm Gonna) Love Me Again"	Won	
2019	Satellite Awards	Best Sound	Matthew Collinge and John Hayes	Nominated	
2020	Hollywood Critics Association	Best Actor	Taron Egerton	Nominated	
2020	Hollywood Critics Association	Best Comedy/Musical	Rocketman	Won	
2020	Hollywood Critics Association	Best Costume Design	Julian Day	Won	
2020	Hollywood Critics Association	Best Hair and Makeup	Lizzie Yianni-Georgiou, Tapio Salmi and Barrie Gower	Nominated	
2020	Hollywood Critics Association	Best Original Song	Elton John and Bernie Taupin for "(I'm Gonna) Love Me Again"	Nominated	
2020	Make-Up Artists and Hair Stylists Guild	Best Special Make-Up Effects, Film	Barrie Gower, Lizzie Yianni-Georgiou, Victoria Money	Nominated	
2020	Make-Up Artists and Hair Stylists Guild	Best Period/Character Make-Up, Film	Elizabeth Yianni-Georgiou, Tapio Salmi, and Laura Solari	Nominated	
2020	Make-Up Artists and Hair Stylists Guild	Best Period/Character Hair Styling, Film	Elizabeth Yianni-Georgiou, Tapio Salmi, and Laura Solari	Nominated	
2020	Santa Barbara International Film Festival	Virtuoso Award	Taron Egerton	Won	
2020	Golden Reel Awards	Outstanding Achievement in Sound Editing – Dialogue and ADR	Danny Sheehan	Nominated	
2020	Golden Reel Awards	Outstanding Achievement in Sound Editing – Musical	Andy Patterson, Cécile Tournesac	Won	
2020	Costume Designers Guild Awards	Excellence in Period Film	Julian Day	Nominated	
2020	Casting Society of America	Feature Big Budget – Comedy	Reginald Poerscot-Edgerton	Nominated	
2020	GLAAD Media Awards	Outstanding Film – Wide Release	Rocketman	Nominated	

== Historical accuracy ==
As Rocketman was not meant to be a chronologically precise documentary film, creative license was taken with the timing or specifics of the real people or historical events depicted in the film.

=== Events ===
The timeline of John and Taupin's friendship and career is altered to an extent, as the first song they wrote together after they met in 1967 was "Scarecrow", while "Border Song" was not written until 1969. John and Taupin also spent two years working as staff songwriters for Dick James, beginning in 1968, and created tracks for artists such as Roger Cook and Lulu, with the first album of the pair's music being 1969's Empty Sky. Regarding the claim that John and Taupin never had an argument, the liner notes for the 1975 album Captain Fantastic and the Brown Dirt Cowboy features a 12 January 1969 diary entry written by John that reads, "Had row with Bernie." In a 2011 interview, John said he could not remember what they had a row about.

Dick James was the one who encouraged then-Reggie Dwight to choose a stage name, and on 7 May 1972, he legally changed his name to Elton Hercules John; however, John is shown auditioning for James by playing "Daniel" and "I Guess That's Why They Call It the Blues", but the songs were not written until 1972 and 1983, respectively.

While John did take his first name after Bluesology bandmate Elton Dean, his surname was actually adopted from his early mentor and friend, Long John Baldry, who had hired Bluesology as his backup band in 1966, and not John Lennon. John admired Baldry as one of the few people in the music scene who were both openly gay and highly esteemed.

John is shown to have dated a landlady named Arabella, but he actually dated a secretary named Linda Hannon (née Woodrow) for two years, and was engaged to her in 1969. John ended up sinking into a suicidal depression due to stress faced with the prospect of living a domestic life in the suburbs, and attempted suicide before being found by Bernie Taupin. Less than a month before the wedding, John suddenly broke off their engagement on the advice of Baldry. The experience inspired Taupin to write the lyrics for the song "Someone Saved My Life Tonight". Hannon revealed her disappointment for not being mentioned in the film.

John's 1970 performance at the Troubadour was actually well over a year after Neil Young's last show at the venue (Young has not done another concert there since), and John's show, on 25 August 1970, was actually on a Tuesday (as opposed to the Monday in the film). John is shown playing "Crocodile Rock" at the Troubadour, but the song was not written until two years later; and is also seen meeting his backing band on the night of the show, but he had been touring with bassist Dee Murray and drummer Nigel Olsson all over England since April 1970, four months before they went to Los Angeles. The guitarist at the Troubadour concert is fictional: John did not have a guitarist until Davey Johnstone in 1972.

John is seen meeting John Reid at Mama Cass's house in Los Angeles, but they actually met at a Motown Records Christmas party in London in December 1970.

John's concert at the Dodger Stadium was in 1975, one year before the recording of "Don't Go Breaking My Heart".

John did meet Renate Blauel while she was working as a sound engineer on one of his albums, but it was actually on 1983's Too Low for Zero, not 1979's Victim of Love. He proposed to her on 10 February 1984 in Australia, and they married in Sydney on Valentine's Day of the same year. They officially announced their divorce on 18 November 1988.

John did cancel a concert at the Madison Square Garden in New York, although this was in 1984 due to illness. John actually checked into rehab in 1990 at the Advocate Lutheran General Hospital in Chicago a few months after a young friend, Ryan White, had died from AIDS, and after a visit to his boyfriend at the time, Hugh Williams, in a rehab facility in Prescott, Arizona.

"I'm Still Standing" was not written while John was in rehab; the song was recorded in 1982, and the song and the video were released a year later.

=== People ===
John's half-brother Geoff Dwight disputed the characterization of their father, Stanley Dwight, stating, "My dad was kind and gentle. He spoke his mind but encouraged us all, including Elton, to do what we were good at. As a boy, when he started supporting Watford, it was my father who took him to the matches." In a previous 2010 interview, Geoff recalled, "When I was growing up, Elton was always there and we had a lot of fun on family holidays and things like that". John's stepmother, Edna, told biographer Philip Norman for 2001's Sir Elton: The Definitive Biography that "Stanley's been made out as an overbearing monster. But it's just not true. He was a lovely man, a good father, and a loving husband." She added that, far from discouraging his son's musical talent, Dwight bought him a piano in 1963, showing Norman the receipt. He also wrote a letter to congratulate Elton on winning a scholarship to the Royal Academy of Music.

On the other hand, the portrayal of John's mother, Sheila, was regarded as being far more accurate. She did not allow him to get an Elvis Presley styled haircut, though John idolized the American's look.

The depiction of Dick James was disputed by musician Caleb Quaye, who was a member of John's former band Bluesology. Quaye described James as "a gentleman," and criticised him being shown in the film as a boorish, foul-mouthed cockney. "He wasn't cockney. He was an old-school music man but was smartly dressed, you never heard a cuss word out of him. He was like a father, he gave us an opportunity to learn our craft. I don't understand the fantasy of depicting him like that because he was nothing like it." James' son, Stephen James (who helped discover Elton and encouraged Dick to sign him up to his music label DJM Records), also criticised the film's portrayal of his father, calling John "basically a coward" and claiming that he wanted to destroy "everybody who was helpful or good" during the early days of his career, adding, "I don't understand why he seems to feel the need to try to destroy everybody who helped him. We only ever tried to do the best for him and to promote his career. I really am very upset that he has turned on people in this way. They basically depict my father in the film completely opposite to the way he was in real life." Beatles historian Mark Lewisohn also criticised the depiction of James in the film, calling it "utterly outrageous and really disgusting."

The portrayal of John Reid, who is depicted as being emotionally abusive towards John, was attacked by Mike Batt as a "weapons-grade character assassination".

== See also ==
- Dexter Fletcher filmography
- List of biographical films of the 2010s
- List of LGBT-related films of 2019
- Winners of the Academy Award for Best Original Song
