= List of songs recorded by Elton John =

Songs recorded by British musician

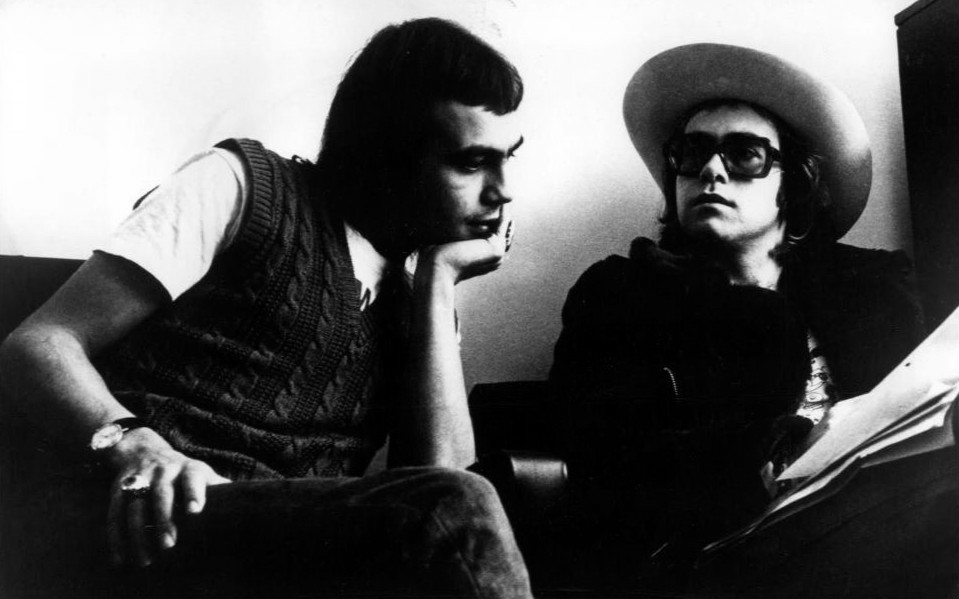
Elton John with Bernie Taupin, who has been John's primary lyricist since 1967

British singer, songwriter and pianist Elton John has recorded a total of 464 songs, most of which are written by him and Bernie Taupin.

John formed the blues band Bluesology in 1962. After leaving Bluesology in 1967 to embark on a solo career, John met Taupin after they both answered an advert for songwriters, and he released his debut album Empty Sky in 1969. In 1970, John formed the Elton John Band with Dee Murray and Nigel Olsson, and released his first hit single, "Your Song". His band has gone through several lineup changes, but Olsson, Davey Johnstone, and Ray Cooper have been members, albeit not continuously, since 1970, 1971 and 1973 respectively.

John's critical and commercial success was at its peak in the 1970s, when John released a streak of chart-topping albums in the US and UK which began with Honky Château (1972) and culminated with Blue Moves (1976), and also included his best-selling album Goodbye Yellow Brick Road (1973) and concept album Captain Fantastic and the Brown Dirt Cowboy (1975).

While not achieving the same level of success as his 1970s body of work, John's music in the 1980s was also successful, with a release of hit singles including "I'm Still Standing" and "Sacrifice". Following the death of Princess Diana in 1997, John released the double A-side charity single "Candle in the Wind 1997"/"Something About the Way You Look Tonight", which sold over 33 million copies worldwide, and also performed the tribute single at Diana's funeral. John has continued to record new music in the 21st century.

Throughout his career, John has collaborated with a wide range of musical artists. His first major collaboration was "Don't Go Breaking My Heart', his 1976 duet with Kiki Dee. He went on to collaborate with George Michael on a live recording of "Don't Let the Sun Go Down on Me" in 1991, having previously worked with him on the 1985 song "Wrap Her Up". He composed music with Tim Rice for The Lion King in 1993 and Aida in 2000. Other individuals with whom John has collaborated include Ed Sheeran ("Merry Christmas"), Dua Lipa ("Cold Heart"), Britney Spears ("Hold Me Closer"), Leon Russell (on their collaborative album The Union), Eminem (a live recording of "Stan"), Tupac Shakur (the posthumous single "Ghetto Gospel"), Kanye West ("All of the Lights"), Lady Gaga ("Sine from Above") and Ozzy Osbourne ("Ordinary Man"). In 2021, John released the collaborative album The Lockdown Sessions, featuring collaborations with artists including Years & Years, Damon Albarn of Blur and Gorillaz, Pearl Jam frontman Eddie Vedder, Brandi Carlile, Charlie Puth, Stevie Wonder, Nicki Minaj, Young Thug, Stevie Nicks, and Glen Campbell.

== Songs ==
Name of song, writer(s), original release, and year of release
Song	Writer(s)	Original release	Year	Ref.
"Across the River Thames"	Elton John; Bernie Taupin	The Captain & the Kid (UK edition bonus track)	2006	
"Ain't Nothing Like the Real Thing" (Elton John and Marcella Detroit)	Nickolas Ashford; Valerie Simpson	Duets	1993	
"All Across the Havens"	Elton John; Bernie Taupin	B-side to "Lady Samantha" (Note: Later released on the 1995 reissue of Empty Sky)	1969	
"All Quiet on the Western Front"	Elton John; Bernie Taupin	Jump Up!	1982	
"All That I'm Allowed"	Elton John; Bernie Taupin	Peachtree Road	2004	
"All the Girls Love Alice"	Elton John; Bernie Taupin	Goodbye Yellow Brick Road	1973	
"All the Nasties"	Elton John; Bernie Taupin	Madman Across the Water	1971	
"Amazes Me"	Elton John; Bernie Taupin	Sleeping with the Past	1989	
"American Triangle"	Elton John; Bernie Taupin	Songs from the West Coast	2001	
"Amoreena"	Elton John; Bernie Taupin	Tumbleweed Connection	1970	
"Amy"	Elton John; Bernie Taupin	Honky Château	1972	
"And the Clock Goes Round"	Elton John; Bernie Taupin	Regimental Sgt. Zippo	2021	
"And the House Fell Down"	Elton John; Bernie Taupin	The Captain & the Kid	2006	
"Angeline"	Elton John; Bernie Taupin; Alan Carvell	Leather Jackets	1986	
"Angel Tree"	Elton John; Bernie Taupin	Regimental Sgt. Zippo	2021	
"Answer in the Sky"	Elton John; Bernie Taupin	Peachtree Road	2004	
"The Aquarium"	Elton John	The Muse (soundtrack)	1999	
"Are We Laughing"	Elton John	The Muse (soundtrack)	1999	
"Are You Ready for Love"	LeRoy Bell; Casey James; Thom Bell	The Thom Bell Sessions (EP)	1979	
"Back to Paramount"	Elton John	The Muse (soundtrack)	1999	
"Back to the Aquarium"	Elton John	The Muse (soundtrack)	1999	
"Bad Side of the Moon"	Elton John; Bernie Taupin	B-side to "Border Song"	1970	
"Ball and Chain"	Elton John; Gary Osborne	Jump Up!	1982	
"Ballad of a Well-Known Gun"	Elton John; Bernie Taupin	Tumbleweed Connection	1970	
"The Ballad of Blind Tom"	Elton John; Bernie Taupin	The Diving Board	2013	
"The Ballad of Danny Bailey (1909–34)"	Elton John; Bernie Taupin	Goodbye Yellow Brick Road	1973	
"Ballad of the Boy in the Red Shoes"	Elton John; Bernie Taupin	Songs from the West Coast	2001	
"Belfast"	Elton John; Bernie Taupin	Made in England	1995	
"Believe"	Elton John; Bernie Taupin	Made in England	1995	
"Bennie and the Jets"	Elton John; Bernie Taupin	Goodbye Yellow Brick Road	1973	
"The Best Part of the Day" (Elton John and Leon Russell)	Elton John; Bernie Taupin	The Union	2010	
"Better Have a Gift"	Elton John	The Muse (soundtrack)	1999	
"Better Off Dead"	Elton John; Bernie Taupin	Captain Fantastic and the Brown Dirt Cowboy	1975	
"Between Seventeen and Twenty"	Elton John; Bernie Taupin; Davey Johnstone; Caleb Quaye	Blue Moves	1976	
"Big Dipper"	Elton John; Gary Osborne	A Single Man	1978	
"Big Man in a Little Suit"	Elton John; Bernie Taupin	B-side of "Live Like Horses"	1997	
"The Big Picture"	Elton John; Bernie Taupin	The Big Picture	1997	
"Billy Bones and the White Bird"	Elton John; Bernie Taupin	Rock of the Westies	1975	
"Birds"	Elton John; Bernie Taupin	Songs from the West Coast	2001	
"The Bitch Is Back"	Elton John; Bernie Taupin	Caribou	1974	
"Bite Your Lip (Get Up and Dance!)"	Elton John; Bernie Taupin	Blue Moves	1976	
"Bitter Fingers"	Elton John; Bernie Taupin	Captain Fantastic and the Brown Dirt Cowboy	1975	
"Black Icy Stare" (Elton John vs. Pnau)	–	Good Morning to the Night	2012	
"Blessed"	Elton John; Bernie Taupin	Made in England	1995	
"Blue Avenue"	Elton John; Bernie Taupin	Sleeping with the Past	1989	
"Blue Wonderful"	Elton John; Bernie Taupin	Wonderful Crazy Night	2016	
"Blue Eyes"	Elton John; Gary Osborne	Jump Up!	1982	
"Blues for My Baby and Me"	Elton John; Bernie Taupin	Don't Shoot Me I'm Only the Piano Player	1973	
"Blues Never Fade Away"	Elton John; Bernie Taupin	The Captain & the Kid	2006	
"Boogie Pilgrim"	Elton John; Bernie Taupin; Davey Johnstone; Caleb Quaye	Blue Moves	1976	
"Border Song"	Elton John; Bernie Taupin	Elton John	1970	
"Born Bad"	Pete Bellotte; Geoff Bastow	Victim of Love	1979	
"Born to Lose" (Elton John and Leonard Cohen)	Ted Daffan	Duets	1993	
"Breaking Down Barriers"	Elton John; Gary Osborne	The Fox	1981	
"Breaking Hearts (Ain't What It Used to Be)"	Elton John; Bernie Taupin	Breaking Hearts	1984	
"The Bridge"	Elton John; Bernie Taupin	The Captain & the Kid	2006	
"Burn Down the Mission"	Elton John; Bernie Taupin	Tumbleweed Connection	1970	
"Burning Buildings"	Elton John; Bernie Taupin	Breaking Hearts	1984	
"The Cage"	Elton John; Bernie Taupin	Elton John	1970	
"Cage the Songbird"	Elton John; Bernie Taupin; Davey Johnstone	Blue Moves	1976	
"The Camera Never Lies"	Elton John; Bernie Taupin	Reg Strikes Back	1988	
"Can I Put You On"	Elton John; Bernie Taupin	Friends	1971	
"Can You Feel the Love Tonight"	Elton John; Tim Rice	The Lion King: Original Motion Picture Soundtrack	1994	
"Candle in the Wind"	Elton John; Bernie Taupin	Goodbye Yellow Brick Road	1973	
"Candle in the Wind 1997"	Elton John; Bernie Taupin	Non-album single	1997	
"Candlelit Bedroom"	Elton John; Bernie Taupin	The Diving Board (deluxe edition)	2013	
"Candy by the Pound"	Elton John; Bernie Taupin	Ice on Fire	1985	
"Can't Stay Alone Tonight"	Elton John; Bernie Taupin	The Diving Board	2013	
"The Captain and the Kid"	Elton John; Bernie Taupin	The Captain & the Kid	2006	
"Captain Fantastic and the Brown Dirt Cowboy"	Elton John; Bernie Taupin	Captain Fantastic and the Brown Dirt Cowboy	1975	
"Carla/Etude"	Elton John	The Fox	1981	
"Cartier"	Elton John; Bernie Taupin	B-side of "Sartorial Eloquence"	1980	
"Chameleon"	Elton John; Bernie Taupin	Blue Moves	1976	
"Chasing the Crown"	Elton John; Bernie Taupin	21 at 33	1980	
"Children's Song"	Elton John; Bernie Taupin	Wonderful Crazy Night (super deluxe edition)	2016	
"Chloe"	Elton John; Gary Osborne	The Fox	1981	
"Circle of Life"	Elton John; Tim Rice	The Lion King: Original Motion Picture Soundtrack	1994	
"Claw Hammer"	Elton John; Bernie Taupin	Wonderful Crazy Night	2016	
"Club at the End of the Street"	Elton John; Bernie Taupin	Sleeping with the Past	1989	
"Cold"	Elton John; Bernie Taupin	Made in England	1995	
"Cold as Christmas (In the Middle of the Year)"	Elton John; Bernie Taupin	Too Low for Zero	1983	
"Cold Highway"	Elton John; Bernie Taupin	B-side of "The Bitch Is Back"	1974	
"Come Down in Time"	Elton John; Bernie Taupin	Tumbleweed Connection	1970	
"Conquer the Sun"	Elton John; Gary Osborne	B-side of "Little Jeannie"	1980	
"The Cookie Factory"	Elton John	The Muse (soundtrack)	1999	
"Country Comfort"	Elton John; Bernie Taupin	Tumbleweed Connection	1970	
"Country Love Song"	Joseph Jefferson	The Complete Thom Bell Sessions	1989	
"Crazy Water"	Elton John; Bernie Taupin	Blue Moves	1976	
"Crocodile Rock"	Elton John; Bernie Taupin	Don't Shoot Me I'm Only the Piano Player	1973	
"Cry to Heaven"	Elton John; Bernie Taupin	Ice on Fire	1985	
"Crystal"	Elton John; Bernie Taupin	Too Low for Zero	1983	
"Curtains"	Elton John; Bernie Taupin	Captain Fantastic and the Brown Dirt Cowboy	1975	
"Dan Dare (Pilot of the Future)"	Elton John; Bernie Taupin	Rock of the Westies	1975	
"Dancing in the End Zone"	Elton John; Bernie Taupin	B-side of "Healing Hands"	1989	
"A Dandelion Dies in the Wind"	Elton John; Bernie Taupin	Regimental Sgt. Zippo	2021	
"Daniel"	Elton John; Bernie Taupin	Don't Shoot Me I'm Only the Piano Player	1973	
"Dark Diamond"	Elton John; Bernie Taupin	Songs from the West Coast	2001	
"Dear God"	Elton John; Gary Osbourne	21 at 33	1980	
"Dear John"	Elton John; Gary Osborne	Jump Up!	1982	
"Did Anybody Sleep with Joan of Arc"	Elton John; Bernie Taupin	B-side of "This Train Don't Stop There Anymore"	2001	
"Did He Shoot Her?"	Elton John; Bernie Taupin	Breaking Hearts	1984	
"Dirty Little Girl"	Elton John; Bernie Taupin	Goodbye Yellow Brick Road	1973	
"The Diving Board"	Elton John; Bernie Taupin	The Diving Board	2013	
"Dixie Lily"	Elton John; Bernie Taupin	Caribou	1974	
"Don't Go Breaking My Heart" (Note: Another version with RuPaul appears on Duets (1993)) (Elton John and Kiki Dee)	Ann Orson; Carte Blanche (Note: Pseudonyms for Elton John and Bernie Taupin)	Non-album single	1976	
"Don't Let the Sun Go Down on Me" (Note: A live version performed with George Michael appears on Duets (1993))	Elton John; Bernie Taupin	Caribou	1974	
"Don't Trust That Woman"	Cher; Lady Choc Ice (Note: Pseudonym for Elton John)	Leather Jackets	1986	
"Dream #1"	Elton John; Bernie Taupin	The Diving Board	2013	
"Dream #2"	Elton John; Bernie Taupin	The Diving Board	2013	
"Dream #3"	Elton John; Bernie Taupin	The Diving Board	2013	
"A Dream Come True" (Elton John and Leon Russell)	Elton John; Leon Russell	The Union	2010	
"Driving Home"	Elton John	The Muse (soundtrack)	1999	
"Driving to Jack's"	Elton John	The Muse (soundtrack)	1999	
"Driving to Universal"	Elton John	The Muse (soundtrack)	1999	
"Ducktail Jiver"	Elton John; Bernie Taupin	Caribou (2024 Record Store Day edition)	2024	
"Duets for One"	Elton John; Chris Difford	Duets	1993	
"Durban Deep"	Elton John; Bernie Taupin	Sleeping with the Past	1989	
"Earn While You Learn"	Elton John	B-side of "I'm Still Standing"	1983	
"Ego"	Elton John; Bernie Taupin	Non-album single	1976	
"Eight Hundred Dollar Shoes" (Elton John and Leon Russell)	Elton John; Bernie Taupin	The Union	2010	
"Elderberry Wine"	Elton John; Bernie Taupin	Don't Shoot Me I'm Only the Piano Player	1973	
"Electricity"	Elton John; Lee Hall	Peachtree Road (2005 CD reissue)	2005	
"Elton's Song"	Elton John; Tom Robinson	The Fox	1981	
"Emily"	Elton John; Bernie Taupin	The One	1992	
"The Emperor's New Clothes"	Elton John; Bernie Taupin	Songs from the West Coast	2001	
"Empty Garden (Hey Hey Johnny)"	Elton John; Bernie Taupin	Jump Up!	1982	
"Empty Sky"	Elton John; Bernie Taupin	Empty Sky	1969	
"The End Will Come"	Elton John; Bernie Taupin	The Big Picture	1997	
"England and America"	Elton John; Bernie Taupin	Wonderful Crazy Night (deluxe edition)	2016	
"Fanfare"	Elton John; James Newton Howard	The Fox	1981	
"Fascist Faces"	Elton John; Bernie Taupin	The Fox	1981	
"Fat Boys and Ugly Girls"	Elton John; Bernie Taupin	B-side of "The One"	1992	
"Feed Me"	Elton John; Bernie Taupin	Rock of the Westies	1975	
"First Episode at Hienton"	Elton John; Bernie Taupin	Elton John	1970	
"Flintstone Boy"	Elton John; Bernie Taupin	B-side of "Ego"	1978	
"Foreign Fields" (Elton John vs. Pnau)	–	Good Morning to the Night	2012	
"Four Moods"	Paul Buckmaster	Friends	1971	
"The Fox"	Elton John; Bernie Taupin	The Fox	1981	
"Freaks in Love"	Elton John; Bernie Taupin	Peachtree Road	2004	
"Free and Easy"	Elton John; Bernie Taupin	Wonderful Crazy Night (deluxe edition)	2016	
"Friends"	Elton John; Bernie Taupin	Friends	1971	
"Funeral for a Friend/Love Lies Bleeding"	Elton John; Bernie Taupin (Note: "Funeral For a Friend" written by Elton John)	Goodbye Yellow Brick Road	1973	
"Georgia"	Elton John; Gary Osborne	A Single Man	1978	
"Give Me the Love"	Elton John; Judie Tzuke	21 at 33	1980	
"Go It Alone"	Elton John; Bernie Taupin	Leather Jackets	1986	
"Go On and On" (Elton John and Gladys Knight)	Stevie Wonder	Duets	1993	
"The Goaldiggers Song"	Elton John	Non-album single	1977	
"God Never Came There"	Elton John; Bernie Taupin	B-side of "I Want Love"	2001	
"Gone to Shiloh" (Elton John and Leon Russell featuring Neil Young)	Elton John; Bernie Taupin	The Union	2010	
"A Good Heart"	Elton John; Bernie Taupin	Wonderful Crazy Night	2016	
"Goodbye"	Elton John; Bernie Taupin	Madman Across the Water	1971	
"Goodbye Marlon Brando"	Elton John; Bernie Taupin	Reg Strikes Back	1988	
"Goodbye Yellow Brick Road"	Elton John; Bernie Taupin	Goodbye Yellow Brick Road	1973	
"Good Morning to the Night" (Elton John vs. Pnau)	–	Good Morning to the Night	2012	
"(Gotta Get a) Meal Ticket"	Elton John; Bernie Taupin	Captain Fantastic and the Brown Dirt Cowboy	1975	
"The Greatest Discovery"	Elton John; Bernie Taupin	Elton John	1970	
"Grey Seal"	Elton John; Bernie Taupin	Goodbye Yellow Brick Road	1973	
"Grimsby"	Elton John; Bernie Taupin	Caribou	1974	
"Grow Some Funk of Your Own"	Elton John; Bernie Taupin; Davey Johnstone	Rock of the Westies	1975	
"Gulliver/Hay Chewed/Reprise"	Elton John; Bernie Taupin	Empty Sky	1969	
"Guilty Pleasure"	Elton John; Bernie Taupin	Wonderful Crazy Night	2016	
"Gypsy Heart"	Elton John; Bernie Taupin	Leather Jackets	1986	
"Hard Luck Story"	Ann Orson; Carte Blanche	Rock of the Westies	1975	
"Harmony"	Elton John; Bernie Taupin	Goodbye Yellow Brick Road	1973	
"Have Mercy on the Criminal"	Elton John; Bernie Taupin	Don't Shoot Me I'm Only the Piano Player	1973	
"Healing Hands"	Elton John; Bernie Taupin	Sleeping with the Past	1989	
"Heart in the Right Place"	Elton John; Gary Osborne	The Fox	1981	
"Heartache All Over the World"	Elton John; Bernie Taupin	Leather Jackets	1986	
"Hearts Have Turned to Stone" (Elton John and Leon Russell)	Leon Russell	The Union	2010	
"Heavy Traffic"	Elton John; Bernie Taupin; Davey Johnstone	Reg Strikes Back	1988	
"Heels of the Wind"	Elton John; Bernie Taupin	The Fox	1981	
"Hercules"	Elton John; Bernie Taupin	Honky Château	1972	
"Hey Ahab" (Elton John and Leon Russell)	Elton John; Bernie Taupin	The Union	2010	
"High Flying Bird"	Elton John; Bernie Taupin	Don't Shoot Me I'm Only the Piano Player	1973	
"Ho, Ho, Ho (Who'd Be a Turkey at Christmas)"	Elton John; Bernie Taupin	B-side of "Step into Christmas"	1973	
"Holiday Inn"	Elton John; Bernie Taupin	Madman Across the Water	1971	
"Home Again"	Elton John; Bernie Taupin	The Diving Board	2013	
"Honey Roll"	Elton John; Bernie Taupin	Friends	1971	
"Honky Cat"	Elton John; Bernie Taupin	Honky Château	1972	
"Honky Tonk Woman" (live) (The Rolling Stones cover)	Mick Jagger; Keith Richards	17-11-70	1971	
"Hoop of Fire"	Elton John; Bernie Taupin	Leather Jackets	1986	
"Hourglass"	Elton John; Bernie Taupin	Regimental Sgt. Zippo	2021	
"House"	Elton John; Bernie Taupin	Made in England	1995	
"How's Tomorrow"	Elton John; Bernie Taupin	B-side of "Turn the Lights Out When You Leave"	2004	
"Hymn 2000"	Elton John; Bernie Taupin	Empty Sky	1969	
"I Am Your Robot"	Elton John; Bernie Taupin	Jump Up!	1982	
"I Can't Keep This from You"	Elton John; Bernie Taupin	Peachtree Road	2004	
"I Can't Steer My Heart Clear of You"	Elton John; Bernie Taupin	The Big Picture	1997	
"I Cry at Night"	Elton John; Bernie Taupin	B-side of "Part-Time Love"	1978	
"I Don't Care"	Elton John; Gary Osborne	A Single Man	1978	
"I Don't Wanna Go on with You Like That"	Elton John; Bernie Taupin	Reg Strikes Back	1988	
"I Fall Apart"	Elton John; Bernie Taupin	Leather Jackets	1986	
"I Feel Like a Bullet (In the Gun of Robert Ford)"	Elton John; Bernie Taupin	Rock of the Westies	1975	
"I Guess That's Why They Call It the Blues"	Elton John; Davey Johnstone; Bernie Taupin	Too Low for Zero	1983	
"I Just Can't Wait to Be King"	Elton John; Tim Rice	The Lion King: Original Motion Picture Soundtrack	1994	
"I Know the Truth" (Elton John and Janet Jackson)	Elton John; Tim Rice	Elton John and Tim Rice's Aida	1997	
"I Meant to Do My Work Today (A Day in the Country)"	Elton John; Bernie Taupin; Paul Buckmaster	Friends	1971	
"I Must Have Lost It on the Wind"	Elton John; Bernie Taupin	The Captain & the Kid	2006	
"I Need You to Turn To"	Elton John; Bernie Taupin	Elton John	1970	
"I Never Knew Her Name"	Elton John; Bernie Taupin	Sleeping with the Past	1989	
"I Should Have Sent Roses" (Elton John and Leon Russell)	Leon Russell; Bernie Taupin	The Union	2010	
"I Stop and I Breathe"	Elton John; Bernie Taupin	Peachtree Road	2004	
"I Think I'm Going to Kill Myself"	Elton John; Bernie Taupin	Honky Château	1972	
"I Want Love"	Elton John; Bernie Taupin	Songs from the West Coast	2001	
"I'm Gonna Be a Teenage Idol"	Elton John; Bernie Taupin	Don't Shoot Me I'm Only the Piano Player	1973	
"I'm Still Standing"	Elton John; Bernie Taupin	Too Low for Zero	1983	
"I'm Your Puppet" (Elton John and Paul Young)	Spooner Oldham; Dan Penn	Duets	1993	
"I've Got 2 Wings"	Elton John; Bernie Taupin	Wonderful Crazy Night	2016	
"I've Seen That Movie Too"	Elton John; Bernie Taupin	Goodbye Yellow Brick Road	1973	
"I've Seen the Saucers"	Elton John; Bernie Taupin	Caribou	1974	
"Idol"	Elton John; Bernie Taupin	Blue Moves	1976	
"If It Wasn't for Bad" (Elton John and Leon Russell)	Leon Russell	The Union	2010	
"If the River Can Bend"	Elton John; Bernie Taupin	The Big Picture	1997	
"If There's a God in Heaven (What's He Waiting For?)"	Elton John; Bernie Taupin; Davey Johnstone	Blue Moves	1976	
"If You Were Me" (Elton John and Chris Rea)	Chris Rea	Duets	1993	
"In Neon"	Elton John; Bernie Taupin	Breaking Hearts	1984	
"In the Name of You"	Elton John; Bernie Taupin	Wonderful Crazy Night	2016	
"Indian Sunset"	Elton John; Bernie Taupin	Madman Across the Water	1971	
"Island Girl"	Elton John; Bernie Taupin	Rock of the Westies	1975	
"It Ain't Gonna Be Easy"	Elton John; Gary Osborne	A Single Man	1978	
"It's Getting Dark in Here"	Elton John; Bernie Taupin	Peachtree Road	2004	
"It's Me That You Need"	Elton John; Bernie Taupin	Non-album single	1969	
"Jack Rabbit"	Elton John; Bernie Taupin	B-side of "Saturday Night's Alright for Fighting"	1973	
"Jamaica Jerk-Off"	Elton John; Bernie Taupin	Goodbye Yellow Brick Road	1973	
"January"	Elton John; Bernie Taupin	The Big Picture	1997	
"Japanese Hands"	Elton John; Bernie Taupin	Reg Strikes Back	1988	
"Jimmie Rodgers' Dream" (Elton John and Leon Russell)	Elton John; Bernie Taupin; T Bone Burnett	The Union	2010	
"Johnny B. Goode" (Chuck Berry cover)	Chuck Berry	Victim of Love	1979	
"Just Like Belgium"	Elton John; Bernie Taupin	The Fox	1981	
"Just Like Noah's Ark"	Elton John; Bernie Taupin	The Captain & the Kid	2006	
"Just Like Strange Rain"	Elton John; Bernie Taupin	B-side of "It's Me That You Need"	1969	
"Karmatron" (Elton John vs. Pnau)	–	Good Morning to the Night	2012	
"Keep It a Mystery"	Elton John; Bernie Taupin	B-side of "All That I'm Allowed"	2004	
"The King Must Die"	Elton John; Bernie Taupin	Elton John	1970	
"Kiss the Bride"	Elton John; Bernie Taupin	Too Low for Zero	1983	
"Lady Samantha"	Elton John; Bernie Taupin	Non-album single	1969	
"Lady What's Tomorrow"	Elton John; Bernie Taupin	Empty Sky	1969	
"The Last Song"	Elton John; Bernie Taupin	The One	1992	
"Latitude"	Elton John; Bernie Taupin	Made in England	1995	
"Leather Jackets"	Elton John; Bernie Taupin	Leather Jackets	1986	
"Legal Boys"	Elton John; Tim Rice	Jump Up!	1982	
"The Letter"	Elton John; Lee Hall	Peachtree Road (2005 CD reissue)	2005	
"Levon"	Elton John; Bernie Taupin	Madman Across the Water	1971	
"Li'l 'Frigerator"	Elton John; Bernie Taupin	Breaking Hearts	1984	
"Lies"	Elton John; Bernie Taupin	Made in England	1995	
"Little Jeannie"	Elton John; Gary Osbourne	21 at 33	1980	
"A Little Light" (Elton John and Brandi Carlile)	Elton John; Bernie Taupin; Brandi Carlile; Andrew Watt	Who Believes in Angels?	2024	
"Little Richard's Bible" (Elton John and Brandi Carlile)	Elton John; Bernie Taupin; Brandi Carlile; Andrew Watt	Who Believes in Angels?	2024	
"A Little Peace"	Elton John; Bernie Taupin	B-side of "All That I'm Allowed" (Maxi-CD)	2004	
"Live Like Horses"	Elton John; Bernie Taupin	The Big Picture	1997	
"Long Way from Happiness"	Elton John; Bernie Taupin	The Big Picture	1997	
"Look Ma, No Hands"	Elton John; Bernie Taupin	Songs from the West Coast	2001	
"Looking Up"	Elton John; Bernie Taupin	Wonderful Crazy Night	2016	
"Love Her Like Me"	Elton John; Bernie Taupin	Songs from the West Coast	2001	
"Love Is a Cannibal"	Elton John; Bernie Taupin	B-side of "Sacrifice"	1989	
"Love Letters" (Elton John and Bonnie Raitt)	Edward Heyman; Victor Young	Duets	1993	
"Love So Cold"	Elton John; Bernie Taupin	B-side of "Dear God"	1980	
"Love Song"	Lesley Duncan	Tumbleweed Connection	1970	
"Love's Got a Lot to Answer For"	Elton John; Bernie Taupin	The Big Picture	1997	
"Lovesick"	Elton John; Bernie Taupin	B-side of "Song for Guy"	1978	
"Lucy in the Sky with Diamonds" (The Beatles cover)	John Lennon; Paul McCartney	Non-album single	1974	
"Made in England"	Elton John; Bernie Taupin	Made in England	1995	
"Madman Across the Water"	Elton John; Bernie Taupin	Madman Across the Water	1971	
"Madness"	Elton John; Gary Osborne	A Single Man	1978	
"Mama Can't Buy You Love"	LeRoy Bell; Casey James	The Thom Bell Sessions (EP)	1979	
"Man"	Elton John; Bernie Taupin	Made in England	1995	
"The Man Who Never Died"	Elton John; Bernie Taupin	B-side of "Nikita"	1985	
"Mandalay Again" (Elton John and Leon Russell)	Elton John; Bernie Taupin	The Union (deluxe edition)	2010	
"Mansfield"	Elton John; Bernie Taupin	Songs from the West Coast	2001	
"Medicine Man"	Elton John; Bernie Taupin	B-side of You Gotta Love Someone	1990	
"Medley (Yell Help/Wednesday Night/Ugly)"	Elton John; Bernie Taupin; Davey Johnstone	Rock of the Westies	1975	
"Meet Christine"	Elton John	The Muse (soundtrack)	1999	
"Mellow"	Elton John; Bernie Taupin	Honky Château	1972	
"Memory of Love"	Elton John; Gary Osborne	Leather Jackets	1986	
"Merry Christmas Maggie Thatcher"	Elton John; Lee Hall	Peachtree Road (2005 CD reissue)	2005	
"The Messenger" (Elton John and Lulu)	Elton John; Tim Rice	Elton John and Tim Rice's Aida	1997	
"Mexican Vacation (Kids in the Candlelight)"	Elton John; Bernie Taupin	The Diving Board	2013	
"Michelle's Song"	Elton John; Bernie Taupin	Friends	1971	
"Midnight Creeper"	Elton John; Bernie Taupin	Don't Shoot Me I'm Only the Piano Player	1973	
"Mona Lisas and Mad Hatters"	Elton John; Bernie Taupin	Honky Château	1972	
"Mona Lisas and Mad Hatters (Part Two)"	Elton John; Bernie Taupin	Reg Strikes Back	1988	
"Monkey Suit" (Elton John and Leon Russell)	Elton John; Bernie Taupin	The Union	2010	
"Multiple Personality"	Elton John	The Muse (soundtrack)	1999	
"The Muse"	Elton John; Bernie Taupin	The Muse (soundtrack)	1999	
"My Elusive Drug"	Elton John; Bernie Taupin	Peachtree Road	2004	
"My Father's Gun"	Elton John; Bernie Taupin	Tumbleweed Connection	1970	
"My Kind of Hell" (Elton John and Leon Russell)	Elton John; Bernie Taupin	The Union (deluxe edition)	2010	
"My Quicksand"	Elton John; Bernie Taupin	The Diving Board	2013	
"Never Gonna Fall in Love Again"	Elton John; Tom Robinson	21 at 33	1980	
"Never Too Late" (Elton John and Brandi Carlile)	Elton John; Bernie Taupin; Brandi Carlile; Andrew Watt	Who Believes in Angels?	2024	
"Never Too Old (To Hold Somebody)" (Elton John and Leon Russell)	Elton John; Bernie Taupin	The Union	2010	
"The New Fever Waltz"	Elton John; Bernie Taupin	The Diving Board	2013	
"Nice and Slow"	Elton John; Bernie Taupin; Thom Bell	The Complete Thom Bell Sessions	1989	
"Nikita"	Elton John; Bernie Taupin	Ice on Fire	1985	
"Nina"	Elton John; Bernie Taupin	Regimental Sgt. Zippo	2021	
"No Monsters"	Elton John; Bernie Taupin	Wonderful Crazy Night (super deluxe edition)	2016	
"No Shoe Strings on Louise"	Elton John; Bernie Taupin	Elton John	1970	
"No Valentines"	Elton John; Bernie Taupin	Love Songs	1996	
"Nobody Wins"	Jean-Paul Dreau; Gary Osborne	The Fox	1981	
"The North"	Elton John; Bernie Taupin	The One	1992	
"The North Star"	Elton John; Bernie Taupin	B-side of "I Want Love"	2001	
"Oceans Away"	Elton John; Bernie Taupin	The Diving Board	2013	
"Old '67"	Elton John; Bernie Taupin	The Captain & the Kid	2006	
"Old Friend" (Elton John and Nik Kershaw)	Nik Kershaw	Duets	1993	
"On Dark Street"	Elton John; Bernie Taupin	The One	1992	
"The One"	Elton John; Bernie Taupin	The One	1992	
"One Day (At a Time)"	John Lennon	B-side of "Lucy in the Sky with Diamonds"	1974	
"One Horse Town"	Elton John; Bernie Taupin; James Newton Howard	Blue Moves	1976	
"One More Arrow"	Elton John; Bernie Taupin	Too Low for Zero	1983	
"The Open Chord"	Elton John; Bernie Taupin	Wonderful Crazy Night	2016	
"Original Sin"	Elton John; Bernie Taupin	Songs from the West Coast	2001	
"Oscar Wilde Gets Out"	Elton John; Bernie Taupin	The Diving Board	2013	
"Out of the Blue"	Elton John; Bernie Taupin	Blue Moves	1976	
"Pain"	Elton John; Bernie Taupin	Made in England	1995	
"Paris"	Elton John; Bernie Taupin	Leather Jackets	1986	
"Part-Time Love"	Elton John; Gary Osborne	A Single Man	1978	
"Passengers"	Elton John; Bernie Taupin; Davey Johnstone; Phineas MkHize	Breaking Hearts	1984	
"Peter's Song"	Elton John; Bernie Taupin	B-side of "Turn the Lights Out When You Leave"	2004	
"Philadelphia Freedom" (The Elton John Band)	Elton John; Bernie Taupin	Non-album single	1975	
"Phoenix" (Elton John vs. Pnau)	–	Good Morning to the Night	2012	
"Pinball Wizard" (The Who cover)	Pete Townshend	Tommy (soundtrack)	1975	
"Pinky"	Elton John; Bernie Taupin	Caribou	1974	
"Planes"	Elton John; Bernie Taupin	Rare Masters	1992	
"Please"	Elton John; Bernie Taupin	Made in England	1995	
"Poor Cow"	Elton John; Bernie Taupin	Reg Strikes Back	1988	
"Porch Swing in Tupelo"	Elton John; Bernie Taupin	Peachtree Road	2004	
"Postcards from Richard Nixon"	Elton John; Bernie Taupin	The Captain & the Kid	2006	
"The Power" (Elton John and Little Richard)	Elton John; Bernie Taupin	Duets	1993	
"Princess"	Elton John; Gary Osborne	Jump Up!	1982	
"Razor Face"	Elton John; Bernie Taupin	Madman Across the Water	1971	
"Recover Your Soul"	Elton John; Bernie Taupin	The Big Picture	1997	
"Regimental Sgt. Zippo"	Elton John; Bernie Taupin	Regimental Sgt. Zippo	2021	
"Religion"	Elton John; Bernie Taupin	Too Low for Zero	1983	
"Restless"	Elton John; Bernie Taupin	Breaking Hearts	1984	
"The Retreat"	Elton John; Bernie Taupin	B-side of "Princess"	1982	
"Return to Paradise"	Elton John; Gary Osborne	A Single Man	1978	
"Reverie"	Elton John	A Single Man	1978	
"The River Man" (Elton John and Brandi Carlile)	Elton John; Bernie Taupin; Brandi Carlile; Andrew Watt	Who Believes in Angels?	2024	
"Rock and Roll Madonna"	Elton John; Bernie Taupin	Non-album single	1970	
"Rocket Man (I Think It's Going to Be a Long, Long Time)"	Elton John; Bernie Taupin	Honky Château	1972	
"The Rose of Lauro Nyro" (Elton John and Brandi Carlile)	Elton John; Bernie Taupin; Brandi Carlile; Andrew Watt; Laura Nyro	Who Believes in Angels?	2024	
"Rope Around a Fool"	Elton John; Bernie Taupin	B-side of "I Don't Wanna Go on with You Like That"	1988	
"Rotten Peaches"	Elton John; Bernie Taupin	Madman Across the Water	1971	
"Roy Rogers"	Elton John; Bernie Taupin	Goodbye Yellow Brick Road	1973	
"Runaway Train" (Elton John and Eric Clapton)	Elton John; Bernie Taupin; Olle Romo	The One	1992	
"Sacrifice"	Elton John; Bernie Taupin	Sleeping with the Past	1989	
"Sad" (Elton John vs. Pnau)	–	Good Morning to the Night	2012	
"Sad Songs (Say So Much)"	Elton John; Bernie Taupin	Breaking Hearts	1984	
"Sails"	Elton John; Bernie Taupin	Empty Sky	1969	
"Saint"	Elton John; Bernie Taupin	Too Low for Zero	1983	
"Salvation"	Elton John; Bernie Taupin	Honky Château	1972	
"Sarah Escapes"	Elton John	The Muse (soundtrack)	1999	
"Sartorial Eloquence"	Elton John; Tom Robinson	21 at 33	1980	
"Satellite"	Elton John; Bernie Taupin	Ice on Fire	1985	
"Saturday Night's Alright for Fighting"	Elton John; Bernie Taupin	Goodbye Yellow Brick Road	1973	
"The Scaffold"	Elton John; Bernie Taupin	Empty Sky	1969	
"Screw You (Young Man's Blues)"	Elton John; Bernie Taupin	B-side of "Goodbye Yellow Brick Road"	1973	
"Shakey Ground" (Elton John and Don Henley)	Jeffrey Bowen; Al Boyd; Eddie Hazel	Duets	1993	
"Shine on Through"	Elton John; Gary Osborne	A Single Man	1978	
"Shoot Down the Moon"	Elton John; Bernie Taupin	Ice on Fire	1985	
"Shooting Star"	Elton John; Gary Osborne	A Single Man	1978	
"Shoulder Holster"	Elton John; Bernie Taupin	Blue Moves	1976	
"Sick City"	Elton John; Bernie Taupin	B-side of "Don't Let the Sun Go Down on Me"	1974	
"Simple Life"	Elton John; Bernie Taupin	The One	1992	
"Since God Invented Girls"	Elton John; Bernie Taupin	Reg Strikes Back	1988	
"Sitting Doing Nothing"	Elton John; Caleb Quaye	Regimental Sgt. Zippo	2021	
"Sixty" (Elton John vs. Pnau)	–	Good Morning to the Night	2012	
"Sixty Years On"	Elton John; Bernie Taupin	Elton John	1970	
"Skyline Pigeon"	Elton John; Bernie Taupin	Empty Sky	1969	
"Slave"	Elton John; Bernie Taupin	Honky Château	1972	
"Sleeping with the Past"	Elton John; Bernie Taupin	Sleeping with the Past	1989	
"Slow Down Georgie (She's Poison)"	Elton John; Bernie Taupin	Breaking Hearts	1984	
"Slow Rivers" (with Cliff Richard)	Elton John; Bernie Taupin	Leather Jackets	1986	
"Snow Queen" (Elton John and Kiki Dee)	Ann Orson; Carte Blanche	B-side of "Don't Go Breaking My Heart"	1976	
"So Sad the Renegade"	Elton John; Bernie Taupin	B-side of "All That I'm Allowed" (Maxi-CD)	2004	
"Social Disease"	Elton John; Bernie Taupin	Goodbye Yellow Brick Road	1973	
"Solar Prestige a Gammon"	Elton John; Bernie Taupin	Caribou	1974	
"Someone Saved My Life Tonight"	Elton John; Bernie Taupin	Captain Fantastic and the Brown Dirt Cowboy	1975	
"Someone's Final Song"	Elton John; Bernie Taupin	Blue Moves	1976	
"Someone to Belong To" (Elton John and Brandi Carlile)	Elton John; Bernie Taupin; Brandi Carlile; Andrew Watt	Who Believes in Angels?	2024	
"Something About the Way You Look Tonight"	Elton John; Bernie Taupin	The Big Picture	1997	
"Son of Your Father"	Elton John; Bernie Taupin	Tumbleweed Connection	1970	
"Song for Guy"	Elton John; Gary Osborne	A Single Man	1978	
"Sorry Seems to Be the Hardest Word"	Elton John; Bernie Taupin	Blue Moves	1976	
"Soul Glove"	Elton John; Bernie Taupin	Ice on Fire	1985	
"Spiteful Child"	Elton John; Bernie Taupin	Jump Up!	1982	
"Spotlight"	Pete Bellotte; Stefan Wisnet; Gunther Moll	Victim of Love	1979	
"Steal Away Child"	Elton John; Gary Osborne	B-side of "Dear God"	1980	
"Step into Christmas"	Elton John; Bernie Taupin	Non-album single	1973	
"A Step Too Far" (Elton John, Heather Headley and Sherie Scott)	Elton John; Tim Rice	Elton John and Tim Rice's Aida	1997	
"Steven Redecorates"	Elton John	The Muse (soundtrack)	1999	
"Stinker"	Elton John; Bernie Taupin	Caribou	1974	
"Stones Throw from Hurtin'"	Elton John; Bernie Taupin	Sleeping with the Past	1989	
"Strangers"	Elton John; Gary Osborne	A Single Man (1998 reissue)	1998	
"Street Boogie"	Pete Bellotte; Stefan Wisnet; Gunther Moll	Victim of Love	1979	
"Street Kids"	Elton John; Bernie Taupin	Rock of the Westies	1975	
"Suit of Wolves"	Elton John; Bernie Taupin	B-side of "The One"	1992	
"Susie (Dramas)"	Elton John; Bernie Taupin	Honky Château	1972	
"Sweet Painted Lady"	Elton John; Bernie Taupin	Goodbye Yellow Brick Road	1973	
"Swing for the Fences" (Elton John and Brandi Carlile)	Elton John; Bernie Taupin; Brandi Carlile; Andrew Watt	Who Believes in Angels?	2024	
"Tactics"	Elton John	B-side of "Dear God"	1980	
"Take a Walk with Me"	Elton John	The Muse (soundtrack)	1999	
"Take Me Back"	Elton John; Gary Osbourne	21 at 33	1980	
"Take Me to the Pilot"	Elton John; Bernie Taupin	Elton John	1970	
"Take This Dirty Water"	Elton John; Bernie Taupin	The Diving Board	2013	
"Talking Old Soldiers"	Elton John; Bernie Taupin	Tumbleweed Connection	1970	
"Tambourine"	Elton John; Bernie Taupin	Wonderful Crazy Night	2016	
"Tartan Coloured Lady"	Elton John; Bernie Taupin	Regimental Sgt. Zippo	2021	
"Teacher I Need You"	Elton John; Bernie Taupin	Don't Shoot Me I'm Only the Piano Player	1973	
"Teardrops" (Elton John and k.d. lang)	Cecil Womack; Linda Womack	Duets	1993	
"Telegraph to the Afterlife" (Elton John vs. Pnau)	–	Good Morning to the Night	2012	
"Tell Me What the Papers Say"	Elton John; Bernie Taupin	Ice on Fire	1985	
"Tell Me When the Whistle Blows"	Elton John; Bernie Taupin	Captain Fantastic and the Brown Dirt Cowboy	1975	
"Texan Love Song"	Elton John; Bernie Taupin	Don't Shoot Me I'm Only the Piano Player	1973	
"That's What Friends Are For" (Dionne Warwick, Elton John, Gladys Knight and Stevie Wonder)	Burt Bacharach; Carole Bayer Sager	Friends (Dionne Warwick)	1985	
"Theme (The First Kiss)"/"Seasons" (Note: An instrumental reprise of "Seasons" also appears on Friends)	Elton John; Bernie Taupin	Friends	1971	
"Theme from a Non-Existent TV Series"	Elton John; Bernie Taupin	Blue Moves	1976	
"There's No Tomorrow" (Elton John and Leon Russell)	Elton John; Bernie Taupin; Leon Russell; James Timothy Shaw	The Union	2010	
"They Call Her the Cat"	Elton John; Bernie Taupin	Peachtree Road	2004	
"This Song Has No Title"	Elton John; Bernie Taupin	Goodbye Yellow Brick Road	1973	
"This Train Don't Stop There Anymore"	Elton John; Bernie Taupin	Songs from the West Coast	2001	
"This Town"	Elton John; Bernie Taupin	Ice on Fire	1985	
"Three Way Love Affair"	LeRoy Bell; Casey James	The Thom Bell Sessions (EP)	1979	
"Thunder in the Night"	Pete Bellotte; Michael Hofmann	Victim of Love	1979	
"Ticking"	Elton John; Bernie Taupin	Caribou	1974	
"Tinderbox"	Elton John; Bernie Taupin	The Captain & the Kid	2006	
"Tiny Dancer"	Elton John; Bernie Taupin	Madman Across the Water	1971	
"To the Guesthouse"	Elton John	The Muse (soundtrack)	1999	
"Tonight"	Elton John; Bernie Taupin	Blue Moves	1976	
"Too Low for Zero"	Elton John; Bernie Taupin	Too Low for Zero	1983	
"Too Many Tears"	Elton John; Bernie Taupin	Peachtree Road	2004	
"Too Young"	Elton John; Bernie Taupin	Ice on Fire	1985	
"Tower of Babel"	Elton John; Bernie Taupin	Captain Fantastic and the Brown Dirt Cowboy	1975	
"A Town Called Jubilee"	Elton John; Bernie Taupin	The Diving Board	2013	
"Town of Plenty"	Elton John; Bernie Taupin	Reg Strikes Back	1988	
"True Love" (Elton John and Kiki Dee)	Cole Porter	Duets	1993	
"Turn the Lights Out When You Leave"	Elton John; Bernie Taupin	Peachtree Road	2004	
"Turn to Me"	Elton John; Bernie Taupin	Regimental Sgt. Zippo	2021	
"Two Rooms at the End of the World"	Elton John; Bernie Taupin	21 at 33	1980	
"Understanding Women"	Elton John; Bernie Taupin	The One	1992	
"Val-Hala"	Elton John; Bernie Taupin	Empty Sky	1969	
"Variation on "Friends""	Elton John; Bernie Taupin; Paul Buckmaster	Friends	1971	
"Variation on Michelle's Song (A Day in the Country)"	Elton John; Bernie Taupin; Paul Buckmaster	Friends	1971	
"Victim of Love"	Pete Bellotte; Sylvester Levay; Jerry Rix	Victim of Love	1979	
"Voyeur"	Elton John; Bernie Taupin	The Diving Board	2013	
"Wake Up Wendy"	Elton John; Bernie Taupin	Chef Aid	1998	
"Walk of Shame"	Elton John	The Muse (soundtrack)	1999	
"Warm Love in a Cold World"	Pete Bellotte; Stefan Wisnet; Gunther Moll	Victim of Love	1979	
"The Wasteland"	Elton John; Bernie Taupin	Songs from the West Coast	2001	
"Watching the Planes Go By"	Elton John; Bernie Taupin	Regimental Sgt. Zippo	2021	
"We All Fall in Love Sometimes"	Elton John; Bernie Taupin	Captain Fantastic and the Brown Dirt Cowboy	1975	
"Weight of the World"	Elton John; Bernie Taupin	Peachtree Road	2004	
"Western Ford Gateway"	Elton John; Bernie Taupin	Empty Sky	1969	
"What Should I Do?"	Elton John	The Muse (soundtrack)	1999	
"When a Woman Doesn't Want you"	Elton John; Bernie Taupin	The One	1992	
"When I Think About Love (I Think About You)" (Elton John and P.M. Dawn)	Attrell Cordes	Duets	1993	
"When Love Is Dying" (Elton John and Leon Russell)	Elton John; Bernie Taupin	The Union	2010	
"Whenever You're Ready (We'll Go Steady Again)"	Elton John; Bernie Taupin	B-side of "Saturday Night's Alright for Fighting"	1973	
"When I Was an Autumn Flower"	Elton John; Bernie Taupin	Regimental Sgt. Zippo	2021	
"When This Old World Is Done with Me" (Elton John and Brandi Carlile)	Elton John; Bernie Taupin; Brandi Carlile; Andrew Watt	Who Believes in Angels?	2024	
"Where Have All the Good Times Gone?"	Elton John; Bernie Taupin	Jump Up!	1982	
"Where to Now St. Peter?"	Elton John; Bernie Taupin	Tumbleweed Connection	1970	
"Where's the Shoorah?"	Elton John; Bernie Taupin	Blue Moves	1976	
"Whipping Boy"	Elton John; Bernie Taupin	Too Low for Zero	1983	
"Whispers"	Elton John; Bernie Taupin	Sleeping with the Past	1989	
"White Lady White Powder"	Elton John; Bernie Taupin	21 at 33	1980	
"White Man Danger"	Elton John; Bernie Taupin	B-side of "Sartorial Eloquence"	1980	
"Whitewash County"	Elton John; Bernie Taupin	The One	1992	
"Who Believes in Angels?" (Elton John and Brandi Carlile)	Elton John; Bernie Taupin; Brandi Carlile; Andrew Watt	Who Believes in Angels?	2024	
"Who Wears These Shoes?"	Elton John; Bernie Taupin	Breaking Hearts	1984	
"Wicked Dreams"	Elton John; Bernie Taupin	The Big Picture	1997	
"The Wide-Eyed and Laughing"	Elton John; Bernie Taupin; James Newton Howard; Davey Johnstone; Caleb Quaye	Blue Moves	1976	
"A Woman's Needs" (Elton John and Tammy Wynette)	Elton John; Bernie Taupin	Duets	1993	
"Wonderful Crazy Night"	Elton John; Bernie Taupin	Wonderful Crazy Night	2016	
"A Word in Spanish"	Elton John; Bernie Taupin	Reg Strikes Back	1988	
"Wouldn't Have You Any Other Way (NYC)"	Elton John; Bernie Taupin	The Captain & the Kid	2006	
"Wrap Her Up"	Elton John; Bernie Taupin; Davey Johnstone; Fred Mandel; Charlie Morgan; Paul Westwood	Ice on Fire	1985	
"Writing"	Elton John; Bernie Taupin	Captain Fantastic and the Brown Dirt Cowboy	1975	
"Written in the Stars" (Elton John and LeAnn Rimes)	Elton John; Tim Rice	Elton John and Tim Rice's Aida	1997	
"The Wrong Gift"	Elton John	The Muse (soundtrack)	1999	
"You Can Make History (Young Again)"	Elton John; Bernie Taupin	Love Songs	1996	
"You Gotta Love Someone"	Elton John; Bernie Taupin	Days of Thunder (soundtrack)	1990	
"You'll Be Sorry to See Me Go"	Elton John; Caleb Quaye	Regimental Sgt. Zippo	2021	
"You're So Static"	Elton John; Bernie Taupin	Caribou	1974	
"Your Sister Can't Twist (But She Can Rock 'n Roll)"	Elton John; Bernie Taupin	Goodbye Yellow Brick Road	1973	
"Your Song"	Elton John; Bernie Taupin	Elton John	1970	
"Your Starter for..."	Caleb Quaye	Blue Moves	1976	
"You Without Me" (Elton John and Brandi Carlile)	Elton John; Bernie Taupin; Brandi Carlile; Andrew Watt	Who Believes in Angels?	2024	
