= Elton John albums discography =

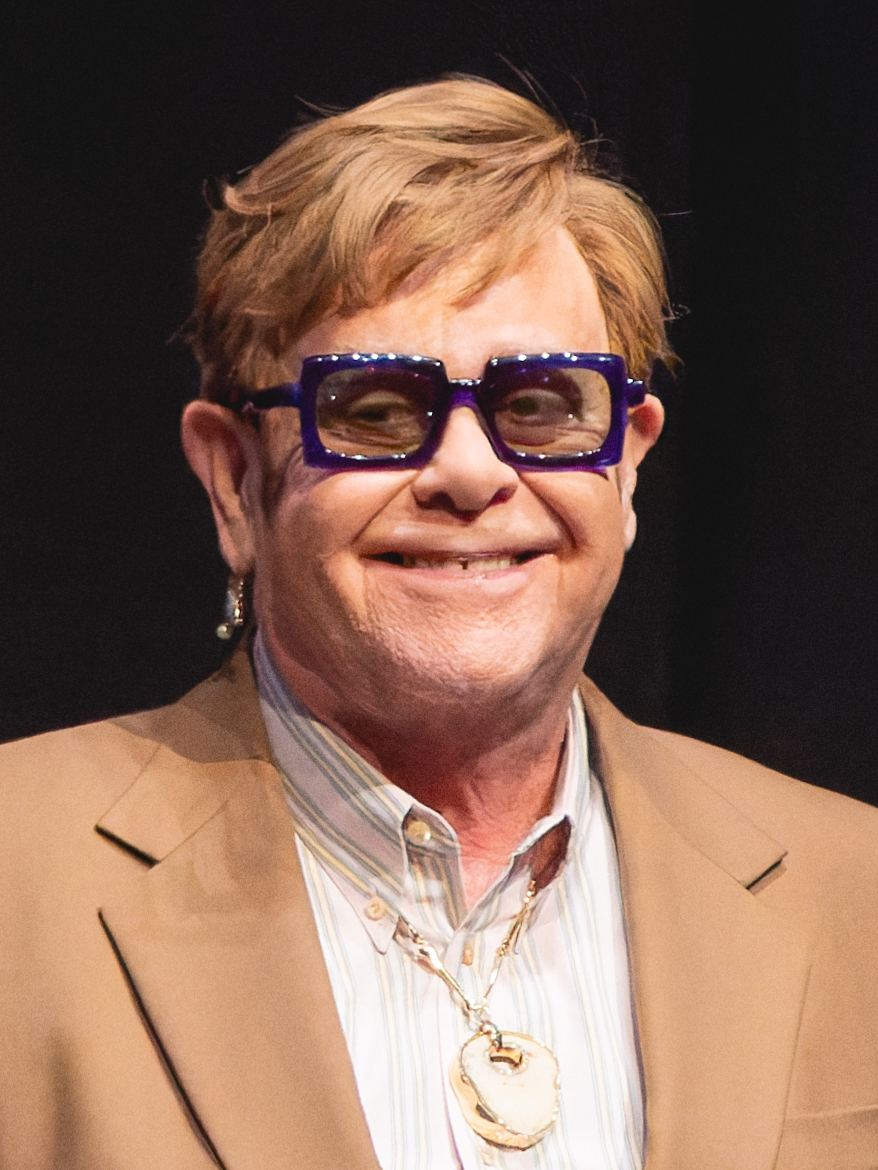
- John in 2024
- Studio albums: 31
- EPs: 4
- Soundtrack albums: 10
- Live albums: 6
- Compilation albums: 16
- Tribute albums: 4
- Collaboration albums: 5
- Christmas albums: 2

The albums discography of British singer, songwriter and pianist Elton John consists of 31 studio albums, 6 live albums, 10 soundtrack albums, 16 compilation albums, 4 extended plays, 4 tribute albums, 5 collaboration albums, and 2 Christmas albums.

In 1969, John's debut album, Empty Sky, was released. In 1970, John released his self-titled second album, Elton John, which featured his first hit single, "Your Song". John's commercial success was at its peak in the 1970s, when he released a streak of chart-topping albums in the US and UK, including Honky Château (1972), Don't Shoot Me I'm Only the Piano Player (1973), Goodbye Yellow Brick Road (1973), Caribou (1974), Captain Fantastic and the Brown Dirt Cowboy (1975), and Rock of the Westies (1975). John continued his success in the 1980s and 1990s, having several hit albums including 21 at 33 (1980), Too Low for Zero (1983), Sleeping with the Past (1989), The One (1992), Made in England (1995), and The Big Picture (1997). John has continued to record new music since then, including the albums Songs from the West Coast (2001), The Diving Board (2013), Wonderful Crazy Night (2016), and The Lockdown Sessions (2021). In 2017, John released the greatest hits album Diamonds, spanning his hits from 1970 to 2016.

Throughout his career, John has sold over 300 million records worldwide, making him one of the best-selling music artists of all time. John's biggest-selling studio album is Goodbye Yellow Brick Road, which has sold more than 20 million copies worldwide and ranks among the best-selling albums worldwide. According to RIAA, he has sold 80 million albums in the United States, making him the 6th-best-selling male solo artist in history. Also according to RIAA, he has sold 35 million singles in the US. In 2019, Billboard ranked him as the greatest solo artist of all time (third overall behind the Beatles and the Rolling Stones). John has accumulated 9 No. 1 singles on the Billboard Hot 100 and 7 No. 1 albums on Billboard 200. John is also Billboard's greatest male solo artist on the Hot 100 of all time (third overall, behind the Beatles and Madonna).

== Studio albums ==
Title	Album details	Peak chart positions										Certifications
Title	Album details	UK	AUS	CAN	FRA	GER	NLD	NOR	NZ	SWE	US	Certifications
Empty Sky	Released: 6 June 1969; Label: DJM; Formats: LP, cassette	—	—	30	—	—	31	—	—	—	6 (Note: Album was not released and did not chart in the United States until 1975.)	
Elton John	Released: 10 April 1970; Label: DJM/Uni (US); Formats: LP, cassette	5	2	4	—	—	2	—	—	—	4	RIAA: Gold; RMNZ: Gold
Tumbleweed Connection	Released: 30 October 1970; Label: DJM/Uni (US); Formats: LP, cassette	2	4	4	—	—	4	—	—	14	5	BPI: Gold; ARIA: Gold; RIAA: Platinum
Madman Across the Water	Released: 5 November 1971; Label: DJM/Uni (US); Formats: LP, cassette	41	8	13	—	32	—	—	—	14	8	BPI: Gold; ARIA: Gold; MC: Platinum; RIAA: 3× Platinum
Honky Château	Released: 19 May 1972; Label: DJM/Uni (US); Formats: LP, cassette	2	4	3	—	43	9	8	—	11	1	BPI: Gold; ARIA: Platinum; MC: Platinum; RIAA: Platinum; RMNZ: Platinum
Don't Shoot Me I'm Only the Piano Player	Released: 22 January 1973; Label: DJM/MCA (US); Formats: LP, cassette, reel tape	1	1	1	—	16	2	1	—	2	1	BPI: Gold; ARIA: 3× Platinum; RIAA: 3× Platinum
Goodbye Yellow Brick Road	Released: 5 October 1973; Label: DJM/MCA (US); Formats: LP, cassette, 8-Track, Reel Tape	1	1	1	—	41	74	5	9	2	1	BPI: 2× Platinum; ARIA: 10× Platinum; MC: 2× Platinum; RIAA: 8× Platinum; RMNZ: Platinum
Caribou	Released: 28 June 1974; Label: DJM/MCA (US); Formats: LP, cassette	1	1	1	—	30	40	6	20	4	1	BPI: Gold; ARIA: 2× Platinum; MC: Platinum; RIAA: 2× Platinum
Captain Fantastic and the Brown Dirt Cowboy	Released: 19 May 1975; Label: DJM/MCA (US); Formats: LP, cassette	2	1	1	1	22	14	2	1	2	1	BPI: Gold; ARIA: 2× Platinum; MC: Platinum; RIAA: 3× Platinum
Rock of the Westies	Released: 24 October 1975; Label: DJM/MCA (US); Formats: LP, cassette	5	4	1	5	33	22	6	4	6	1	BPI: Gold; ARIA: Platinum; MC: Platinum; RIAA: Platinum; RMNZ: Gold
Blue Moves	Released: 22 October 1976; Label: Rocket; Formats: LP, cassette	3	8	5	12	39	7	5	7	12	3	BPI: Gold; ARIA: Platinum; MC: Gold; NVPI: Gold; RIAA: Platinum; SNEP: Gold
A Single Man	Released: 27 October 1978; Label: Rocket; Formats: LP, cassette	8	8	12	12	17	16	4	5	26	15	BPI: Gold; MC: Platinum; NVPI: Gold; RIAA: Platinum; RMNZ: Platinum; SNEP: Gold
Victim of Love	Released: October 1979; Label: Rocket; Formats: LP, cassette	41	20	28	21	—	—	18	44	—	35	ARIA: Gold; MC: Gold
21 at 33	Released: 23 May 1980; Label: Rocket; Formats: LP, cassette	12	7	10	10	21	41	6	3	16	13	ARIA: Platinum; MC: Gold; RIAA: Gold; RMNZ: Gold; SNEP: Gold
The Fox	Released: 20 May 1981; Label: Rocket; Formats: LP, cassette	12	2	43	5	34	20	5	6	25	21	BPI: Silver
Jump Up!	Released: 9 April 1982; Label: Rocket; Formats: LP, cassette	13	3	19	12	47	26	3	1	15	17	BPI: Silver; ARIA: Platinum; RIAA: Gold; RMNZ: Platinum
Too Low for Zero	Released: 31 May 1983; Label: Rocket; Formats: CD, LP, cassette	7	2	17	11	5	28	6	2	30	25	BPI: Platinum; ARIA: 5× Platinum; BVMI: Gold; MC: Platinum; RIAA: Platinum; RMNZ: 2× Platinum; SNEP: Gold
Breaking Hearts	Released: 18 June 1984; Label: Rocket; Formats: CD, LP, cassette	2	1	10	—	5	41	7	2	11	20	BPI: Gold; RIAA: Platinum; RMNZ: Platinum
Ice on Fire	Released: 4 November 1985; Label: Rocket; Formats: CD, LP, cassette	3	6	49	14	5	6	2	8	16	48	BPI: Platinum; BVMI: Gold; IFPI SWE: Platinum; IFPI SWI: 2× Platinum; NVPI: Gold; RIAA: Gold; RMNZ: Platinum; SNEP: Gold
Leather Jackets	Released: 27 October 1986; Label: Rocket; Formats: CD, LP, cassette	24	4	38	—	21	34	12	34	31	91	BPI: Gold; RMNZ: Gold
Reg Strikes Back	Released: 24 June 1988; Label: Rocket; Formats: CD, LP, cassette	18	13	6	30	18	56	8	26	18	16	BPI: Silver; ARIA: Gold; MC: 2× Platinum; RIAA: Gold
Sleeping with the Past	Released: 4 September 1989; Label: Rocket; Formats: CD, LP, cassette	1	2	23	2	9	5	7	1	23	23	BPI: 3× Platinum; ARIA: 3× Platinum; BVMI: Gold; IFPI SWI: 2× Platinum; MC: 2× Platinum; RIAA: Platinum
The One	Released: 22 June 1992; Label: Rocket; Formats: CD, LP, cassette	2	2	7	1	1	14	2	7	8	8	BPI: Gold; ARIA: 2× Platinum; BVMI: Gold; IFPI SWI: 2× Platinum; MC: 3× Platinum; RIAA: 2× Platinum
Made in England	Released: 17 March 1995; Label: Rocket; Formats: CD, LP, cassette	3	6	3	2	4	11	3	10	8	13	BPI: Gold; BVMI: Gold; IFPI SWE: Gold; IFPI SWI: Platinum; MC: 2× Platinum; RIAA: Platinum
The Big Picture	Released: 22 September 1997; Label: Rocket; Formats: CD, cassette	3	5	14	4	8	8	2	7	2	9	BPI: Platinum; ARIA: Platinum; IFPI NOR: Platinum; IFPI SWE: Gold; IFPI SWI: Platinum; MC: Platinum; RIAA: Platinum
Songs from the West Coast	Released: 1 October 2001; Label: Rocket/Mercury; Formats: CD, cassette	2	7	9	19	14	13	2	24	8	15	BPI: 2× Platinum; ARIA: Gold; IFPI NOR: Gold; IFPI SWE: Gold; IFPI SWI: Gold; MC: Gold; RIAA: Gold
Peachtree Road	Released: 9 November 2004; Label: Rocket/Universal; Formats: CD, LP	21	44	11	63	31	97	16	34	38	17	BPI: Gold; IFPI SWI: Gold; RIAA: Gold
The Captain & the Kid	Released: 18 September 2006; Label: Mercury/Interscope; Formats: CD, LP	6	37	12	56	25	43	10	—	27	18	BPI: Silver
The Diving Board	Released: 13 September 2013; Label: Mercury/Capitol; Formats: CD, LP, digital download	3	26	7	24	11	22	10	20	42	4	BPI: Silver
Wonderful Crazy Night	Released: 5 February 2016; Label: Virgin EMI; Formats: CD, LP, digital download	6	11	18	35	10	43	17	11	15	8	
Regimental Sgt. Zippo	Released: 12 June 2021; Label: Island/Mercury; Formats: LP, CD	—	—	—	—	—	—	—	—	—	197	
"—" denotes items which were not released in that country or failed to chart.

== Collaboration albums ==
Title	Album details	Peak chart positions										Certifications
Title	Album details	UK	AUS	AUT	CAN	FRA	GER	NOR	NZ	SWE	US	Certifications
Duets	Released: 22 November 1993; Label: Rocket; Formats: CD, LP, cassette	5	12	1	14	—	10	3	16	20	25	BPI: Platinum; ARIA: Gold; IFPI AUT: Platinum; IFPI NOR: Platinum; IFPI SWI: Platinum; MC: Platinum; RIAA: Platinum
The Union (with Leon Russell)	Released: 19 October 2010; Label: Mercury/Decca; Formats: CD, LP, digital download	12	28	28	7	51	23	5	24	24	3	BPI: Silver; MC: Gold
Good Morning to the Night (vs Pnau)	Released: 16 July 2012; Label: Mercury; Formats: CD, LP	1	40	—	—	—	—	—	—	—	—	
The Lockdown Sessions	Released: 22 October 2021; Label: EMI, Mercury, Interscope; Formats: CD, cassette, digital download, LP, streaming	1	2	6	5	8	5	14	4	41	10	BPI: Gold; RMNZ: 2× Platinum
Who Believes in Angels? (with Brandi Carlile)	Released: 4 April 2025; Label: Interscope; Formats: CD, LP, digital download	1	26	2	52	—	2	75	6	—	9	
"—" denotes items which were not released in that country or failed to chart.

== Soundtrack albums ==
Title	Album details	Peak chart positions										Certifications
Title	Album details	UK	AUS	AUT	CAN	FRA	GER	NLD	NOR	NZ	US	Certifications
"Friends" Original Soundtrack Recording (Elton John album)	Released: 24 March 1971; Label: Paramount; Formats: LP	—	19	—	17	—	—	6	12	—	36	RIAA: Gold
The Lion King Original Motion Picture Soundtrack (songs written by Elton John and Tim Rice performed by various artists, including Elton John)	Released: 31 May 1994; Label: Walt Disney; Formats: CD, cassette	—	3	4	1	1	7	6	—	—	1	BPI: Platinum; ARIA: Gold; IFPI SWI: 2× Platinum; MC: Diamond; RIAA: Diamond
Elton John and Tim Rice's Aida (pre-Broadway concept album written by Elton John and Tim Rice performed by various artists, including Elton John)	Released: 22 March 1999; Label: Rocket; Formats: CD, cassette	29	—	9	—	24	23	—	12	—	41	RIAA: Gold
The Muse Original Motion Picture Soundtrack (Elton John album)	Released: 24 August 1999; Label: PolyGram; Formats: CD	—	—	—	—	—	—	—	—	—	—	
Elton John's The Road to El Dorado (Elton John album)	Released: 14 March 2000; Label: DreamWorks; Formats: CD, cassette	—	—	40	—	—	—	—	—	—	63	
Billy Elliot the Musical Original Cast Recording (Elton John performs three songs on a separate bonus disc from cast recording, which is written by Elton and Lee Hall)	Released: 7 February 2006; Label: Decca Broadway; Formats: CD	—	—	—	—	—	—	—	—	—	—	
Gnomeo & Juliet Original Motion Picture Soundtrack (songs written by Elton John and Bernie Taupin performed by various artists, mostly by Elton)	Released: 8 February 2011; Label: Buena Vista; Formats: CD, digital download	—	—	—	—	—	—	—	—	—	—	
Music from the Motion Picture Sherlock Gnomes (songs written by Elton John and Bernie Taupin performed by various artists, mostly by Elton and Pnau)	Released: 4 May 2018; Label: Virgin EMI; Formats: digital download, streaming	—	—	—	—	—	—	—	—	—	—	
Rocketman: Music from the Motion Picture (songs written by Elton John and Bernie Taupin performed by various artists, mostly by Taron Egerton)	Released: 24 May 2019; Label: EMI, Interscope; Formats: CD, LP, digital download	5	6	38	—	55	67	81	—	9	4	BPI: Gold
The Lion King Original Motion Picture Soundtrack (songs written by Elton John and Tim Rice performed by various artists, including Elton John)	Released: 11 July 2019; Label: Walt Disney; Formats: CD, digital download	—	3	15	18	35	32	10	28	5	13	
Never Too Late: Soundtrack to the Disney+ Documentary (Elton John album)	Released: 13 December 2024; Label: UMG; Formats: digital download, streaming	—	—	—	—	—	—	—	—	—	—	
"—" denotes items which were not released in that country or failed to chart.

== Christmas albums ==
Title	Album details
Elton John's Christmas E.P.	Released: 1990; Label: Rocket; Formats: EP
Elton John's Christmas Party	Released: 10 November 2005; Label: Hear Music; Formats: CD

== Live albums ==
Title	Album details	Peak chart positions										Certifications
Title	Album details	UK	AUS	CAN	FRA	GER	NLD	NOR	NZ	SWE	US	Certifications
17-11-70	Released: 9 April 1971; Label: DJM; Formats: LP	20	20	10	—	—	32	—	—	—	11	
Here and There	Released: 30 April 1976; Label: DJM; Formats: LP, cassette	6	11	13	—	—	—	19	3	30	4	BPI: Gold; MC: Gold; RIAA: Platinum
Live in Australia (with the Melbourne Symphony Orchestra)	Released: July 1987; Label: Rocket; Formats: CD, LP, cassette	43	5	43	—	—	43	—	11	—	24	ARIA: Platinum; MC: 2× Platinum; RIAA: Platinum
One Night Only – The Greatest Hits	Released: 13 November 2000; Label: Mercury; Formats: CD, cassette	7	32	—	—	21	50	14	10	16	65	BPI: Platinum; ARIA: Gold; IFPI SWI: Gold; MC: Gold; RIAA: Gold
Live from Moscow 1979 (with Ray Cooper)	Released: 13 April 2019; Label: Universal Music; Formats: CD, LP	—	—	—	166	—	—	—	—	—	—	
Live from the Rainbow Theatre (with Ray Cooper)	Released: 12 April 2025; Label: Universal Music; Formats: LP	—	—	—	—	—	—	—	—	—	—	
Who Believes in Angels? (Live at the London Palladium) (with Brandi Carlile)	Released: 28 November 2025; Label: Universal Music; Formats: LP	—	—	—	—	—	—	—	—	—	—	
"—" denotes items which were not released in that country or failed to chart.

== Compilation albums ==
Title	Album details	Peak chart positions										Certifications
Title	Album details	UK	AUS	AUT	CAN	FRA	GER	NOR	NZ	SWE	US	Certifications
Greatest Hits	Released: 8 November 1974; Label: DJM; Formats: LP, cassette	1	1	—	1	—	43	3	5	—	1	BPI: Platinum; MC: Diamond; RIAA: Diamond (17× Platinum)
Elton John's Greatest Hits Volume II	Released: 30 September 1977; Label: DJM; Formats: LP, cassette	6	46	—	6	—	—	—	6	—	21	BPI: Gold; MC: Platinum; RIAA: 5× Platinum
Lady Samantha	Released: 1 March 1980; Label: DJM; Formats: LP, cassette	56	74	—	—	—	—	—	—	—	—	
Love Songs	Released: 1982; Label: Rocket; Formats: CD, LP, cassette	—	—	—	—	—	—	—	—	—	—	
The Superior Sound of Elton John (1970–1975)	Released: 1983/1984; Label: DJM; Formats: CD, LP, cassette	—	—	—	—	—	—	—	—	—	—	
Your Songs	Released: 14 July 1985; Label: Rocket; Formats: CD, LP, cassette	—	—	—	—	—	1	—	—	—	—	BVMI: Gold; RIAA: Gold
Elton John's Greatest Hits Volume III	Released: 8 September 1987; Label: Geffen; Formats: CD, LP, cassette	—	—	—	33	—	—	—	—	—	84	RIAA: 2× Platinum
The Very Best of Elton John	Released: 29 October 1990; Label: DJM; Formats: CD, LP, cassette	1	1	1	—	1	2	1	1	1	—	BPI: 9× Platinum; ARIA: 6× Platinum; BVMI: 2× Platinum; IFPI AUT: 3× Platinum; IFPI SWI: 4× Platinum
To Be Continued...	Released: 8 November 1990; Label: Rocket; Formats: CD, cassette	—	—	—	21	—	—	—	—	—	82	MC: Gold; RIAA: 2× Platinum
Rare Masters	Released: 20 October 1992; Label: Polydor; Formats: CD, cassette	—	—	—	—	—	—	—	—	—	—	
Greatest Hits 1976–1986	Released: 3 November 1992; Label: MCA; Formats: CD, cassette	—	—	—	—	—	—	—	—	—	—	RIAA: 2× Platinum
Chartbusters Go Pop	Released: 1994; Label: RPM; Formats: CD, LP	—	—	—	—	—	—	—	—	—	—	
Love Songs	Released: 6 November 1995; Label: Mercury; Formats: CD, LP, cassette	4	7	4	12	—	7	1	1	2	24	BPI: 3× Platinum; ARIA: 3× Platinum; BVMI: Platinum; IFPI AUT: Platinum; IFPI SWI: 2× Platinum; MC: 2× Platinum; RIAA: 3× Platinum
Greatest Hits 1970–2002	Released: 11 November 2002; Label: Mercury; Formats: CD	3	6	19	18	3	19	6	8	12	12	BPI: 5× Platinum; ARIA: 2× Platinum; BVMI: Platinum; IFPI AUT: Gold; IFPI SWI: Gold; MC: 4× Platinum; RIAA: 6× Platinum
Rocket Man: The Definitive Hits	Released: 26 March 2007; Label: Mercury; Formats: CD, digital download	2	10	32	8	—	47	3	5	6	9	BPI: Platinum; ARIA: 3× Platinum; RIAA: 3× Platinum
Diamonds	Released: 10 November 2017; Label: Virgin EMI, Island, UMG; Formats: CD, vinyl, digital download	1	3	26	5	9	31	—	2	—	7	BPI: 7× Platinum; ARIA: 3× Platinum; RIAA: 2× Platinum; RMNZ: 4× Platinum
Elton: Jewel Box	Released: 13 November 2020; Label: EMI, Universal Music Catalogue; Formats: CD, vinyl, streaming	68	—	—	—	—	24	—	—	—	—	
Never Too Late: The Deeper Cuts	Released: 13 December 2024; Label: UMG; Formats: digital download, streaming	—	—	—	—	—	—	—	—	—	—	
"—" denotes items which were not released in that country or failed to chart.

== Tribute albums ==
Title	Album details	Peak chart positions										Certifications
Title	Album details	AUS	AUT	BEL (FL)	BEL (WA)	GER	NLD	NOR	NZ	SWI	US	Certifications
Two Rooms: Celebrating the Songs of Elton John & Bernie Taupin	Released: 14 October 1991; Label: Mercury, Polydor; Formats: LP, CD	— (Note: Two Rooms did not enter the Australian Albums Chart, but peaked at number 15 on the Australian Compilations chart.)	— (Note: Two Rooms did not enter the Austria Top 40, but peaked at number 5 on the Austrian Compilations chart.)	—	—	—	— (Note: Two Rooms did not enter the Dutch Albums chart, but peaked at number 13 on the Dutch Compilations chart.)	—	—	— (Note: Two Rooms did not enter the Swiss Albums chart, but peaked at number 2 on the Swiss Compilations chart.)	18	BPI: Platinum; ARIA: Platinum; MC: Platinum; RIAA: Platinum; RMNZ: Platinum; SNEP: Gold
Revamp: Reimagining the Songs of Elton John & Bernie Taupin	Released: 6 April 2018; Label: Virgin EMI; Format: CD, LP, Digital download	5	17	38	98	31	101	28	7	17	13	
Restoration: Reimagining the Songs of Elton John and Bernie Taupin	Released: 6 April 2018; Label: Universal Music Group Nashville; Format: CD, LP, Digital download	57	—	181	—	—	—	—	— (Note: Restoration did not enter the New Zealand Albums chart, but peaked at number nine on the NZ Heatseeker Albums.)	59	36	
Positiva Presents: Elton John - The Remixes	Released: 18 April 2026; Label: EMI; Formats: LP	—	—	—	—	—	—	—	—	—	—	

== Extended plays ==
Title	EP details	Peak chart positions
Title	EP details	US
I've Been Loving You	Released: 1968; Label: Philips; Formats: LP	—
The Thom Bell Sessions	Released: June 1979; Label: Rocket; Formats: LP	51
The Complete Thom Bell Sessions	Released: February 1989; Label: Rocket; Formats: CD, LP	—
Remixed	Released: 30 December 2003; Label: Rocket; Formats: CD	—
"—" denotes items which were not released in that country or failed to chart.

== See also ==
- Elton John singles discography
- Rock and Roll Hall of Fame
- Songwriters Hall of Fame
