= Home Again (Elton John song) =

Single by Elton John

from the album The Diving Board
- Released: 24 June 2013
- Genre: Pop
- Length: 5:01
- Label: Capitol (US/Canada); Mercury
- Composer(s): Elton John
- Lyricist(s): Bernie Taupin
- Producer(s): T Bone Burnett

Elton John singles chronology
"Sad (featuring Pnau)" (2014)	"Home Again" (2013)	"Looking Up" (2015)

Music video
- "Home Again" on YouTube

"Home Again" is a song by British musician Elton John and lyricist Bernie Taupin, performed by John and released as the first of two lead singles from his 2013 album The Diving Board.

== Background ==
John explained the background of the song was that "The world had seven wonders once upon a time. It's sure enough the favored nations aided their decline. And all around me I've seen times like it was back when, but like back then, I'd say amen if I could get back home again".

== Release and reception ==
"Home Again" was the first of two lead singles from John's twenty-ninth album The Diving Board, and was well received and has been called one of John's best songs of the 21st century, with Ultimate Classic Rock critic Michael Gallucci stating it "doesn't sound all that different than many of the slower-tempo songs John has released since that 'Lion King' hit almost 20 years ago" and states it "is pretty much on par with John's best material over the past decade or so, which means it's somewhat forgettable. But within the context of The Diving Board, 'Home Again,' thematically at least, could turn out to be the album's anchor", giving it a six out of ten. USA Today critic Edna Gundersen states John "returns to the basic piano/bass/drums approach he started with 40 years ago". Vulture critic Shana Naomi Krochmal placed it 30 in her ranking of all of John's songs, stating its "huge — big chords and big questions, without ever being too much." and claiming it "would be the moment the main character realizes just what he’s lost and pledges anew to make it right, no matter how far he must travel to do so", ending that it "the emotion his voice carries here is pitch perfect". Uncut called it one of the album's highlights, stating it "confronts the need to leave, and the desire to return, against a bleak piano soundscape whipped by wispy, wind-like synth noise".

== Track listing ==
All music is composed by Elton John, all lyrics are written by Bernie Taupin.

1. "Home Again" (radio edit) – 3:34
2. "Home Again" (album version) – 5:01

== Personnel ==
- Elton John – vocals, piano
- David Piltch – bass
- Jay Bellerose – drums
- Keefus Ciancia – keyboards
- George Bohanon – baritone saxophone
- Bruce Fowler – trombone
- Chuck Findley – bugle
- Darrell Leonard – bugle, arrangement
- William Roper – tuba

== Charts ==
Chart performance for Home Again
Chart (2013)	Peak position
Belgium (Ultratop 50 Wallonia)	27
Japan (Japan Hot 100) (Billboard)	82
US Adult Contemporary (Billboard)	14
