= Good Times A' Comin' =

Studio album by Hookfoot
- Released: 1972
- Recorded: 1972
- Studio: Dick James Studio, London
- Genre: Rock
- Label: DJM, A&M
- Producer: Jeff Titmus, Caleb Quaye

Hookfoot chronology
Hookfoot (1971)	Good Times A' Comin' (1972)	Communication (1973)

Good Times A' Comin' is the second album by English rock band Hookfoot.

== Track listing ==
No.	Title	Writer(s)	Length
1.	"Sweet Sweet Funky Music"	Quaye	3:15
2.	"Living in the City"	Quaye	5:55
3.	"If I Had the Words"	Duck, Glover, Pope, Quaye	3:28
4.	"Gunner Webb's Changes"	Duck	3:15
5.	"Painter"	Quaye	6:08
6.	"Flying in the U.S.A."	Quaye	4:20
7.	"Is Anyone There?"	Duck, Glover, Pope, Quaye	4:15
8.	"Slick's Blues for Jumbo"	Duck, Quaye	1:47
9.	"Look to Your Churches"	Duck, Quaye	2:45
10.	"Good Times A' Comin'"	Duck, Glover, Pope, Quaye	6:19
Total length:			41:27

== Personnel ==
- Caleb Quaye – lead vocals, guitar, keyboards
- Dave Glover – bass guitar
- Roger Pope – drums, percussion, vocals
- Ian Duck – harmonica, vocals, guitar
- Bob Kulick – guitar, vocals on track 1

== Production ==
- Produced by Jeff Titmus and Caleb Quaye
- Engineered by Jeff Titmus and Terry Carty
- Michael Ross – sleeve design
- Ed Caraeff – photography
