= Regimental Sgt. Zippo =

Studio album by Elton John
- Released: 12 June 2021
- Recorded: November 1967 – May 1968
- Studio: Dick James Music (London)
- Length: 38:53
- Label: Rocket; Mercury; EMI
- Producer: Caleb Quaye

Elton John chronology
Elton: Jewel Box (2020)	Regimental Sgt. Zippo (2021)	The Lockdown Sessions (2021)

Professional ratings
Review scores
Source	Rating
AllMusic	3/5 stars
The Daily Telegraph	3/5 stars
The Guardian	3/5 stars

Regimental Sgt. Zippo is the thirty-first studio album by British musician Elton John. Recorded during late 1967 and early 1968, it was originally intended to be John's debut album, but his publisher Dick James did not approve of the record's musical style, and the album was scrapped. John then recorded and released Empty Sky (1969) as his debut album instead. Regimental Sgt. Zippo remained unreleased until Record Store Day of June 2021, when it was issued in mono on vinyl. It was followed by a wider release of the album in July 2022 in stereo vinyl and stereo/mono CD.

== Background ==
Regimental Sgt. Zippo was recorded between November 1967 and May 1968. For the sessions, Elton John worked with musicians who were either his or his manager Steve Brown's associates, including guitarist Caleb Quaye and drummer Roger Pope (both members of the band Hookfoot at the time), and bassist Tony Murray (from the Troggs). The songs were recorded in a four-track studio at the offices of Dick James Music.

The project was eventually shelved in favour of what became John's debut album, Empty Sky (1969). Bernie Taupin later confirmed his and Elton John's love of the Beatles and the Moody Blues; however, Dick James, whose company published John and Taupin's songs, did not believe that this was the right artistic direction for them.

According to John's collaborator Bernie Taupin, the album's trippy sound was "a tip of the hat to Sgt. Pepper. It certainly proved that we were hanging on the coattails of things that were currently popular – things like 'A Whiter Shade of Pale' were in vogue at that particular point in time. I think, in a way, I was literally trying to be part of a gang."

Plastic Penny, which featured drummer Nigel Olsson, who played on Empty Sky, and by 1970 was a member of the Elton John Band, covered "Turn to Me" in 1969 on their album Currency.

== Release ==
Regimental Sgt. Zippo was eventually released, 53 years after its recording, on 12 June 2021 for Record Store Day, as a mono vinyl-only release limited to 7,000 copies. It was released on compact disc on 8 July 2022, featuring both mono and stereo mixes of the complete album, along with a stereo vinyl version.

== Track listing ==
All tracks are written by Elton John and Bernie Taupin, except where noted.

Side one

1. "When I Was Tealby Abbey" – 2:35
2. "And the Clock Goes Round" – 3:06
3. "Sitting Doing Nothing" (John, Caleb Quaye) – 2:30
4. "Turn to Me" – 3:16
5. "Angel Tree" – 2:04
6. "Regimental Sgt. Zippo" – 4:44

Side two

1. "A Dandelion Dies in the Wind" – 3:14
2. "You'll Be Sorry to See Me Go" (John, Quaye) – 2:34
3. "Nina" – 3:50
4. "Tartan Coloured Lady" – 4:09
5. "Hourglass" – 2:44
6. "Watching the Planes Go By" – 4:07

== Personnel ==
Credits adapted from Elton John's website and album liner notes.

Musicians

- "Elton John (as Reg Dwight)" (Note: All of John's writing credits are listed as by Elton John; in listing the musicians who played on the album, John's musician credit literally reads Elton John (as Reg Dwight)) – acoustic piano, electric piano, organ, harpsichord, lead and backing vocals
- Caleb Quaye – acoustic and electric guitars, flute, percussion, backing vocals
- Tony Murray – bass, backing vocals
- Dave Hynes – drums, backing vocals
- Roger Pope - drums
- Paul Fenoulhet Orchestra – orchestra
- Zack Laurence – orchestral arrangements

Technical

- Caleb Quaye – producer
- Dave Larkham – original Elton John illustration
- Darren Evans – sleeve design
- Frank Owen – engineer
- John Barrett – mixing
- Sean Magee – mastering

== Charts ==
Chart performance for Regimental Sgt. Zippo
Chart (2021–2022)	Peak position
Belgian Albums (Ultratop Wallonia)	191
Scottish Albums (OCC)	15
Swiss Albums (Schweizer Hitparade)	96
US Billboard 200	197
US Top Rock Albums (Billboard)	42
US Indie Store Album Sales (Billboard)	10
