= I've Been Loving You =

1968 single by Elton John

- Portugal EP sleeve art

Single by Elton John
- B-side: "Here's to the Next Time"
- Released: 1 March 1968
- Recorded: February 1968
- Genre: Pop
- Label: Philips (UK)
- Songwriters: Elton John, Bernie Taupin
- Producer: Caleb Quaye

Elton John singles chronology
"I've Been Loving You" (1968)	"Lady Samantha" (1969)

"I've Been Loving You" is the 1968 debut single by British musician Elton John with lyrics credited to Bernie Taupin (although John later admitted that he wrote the song by himself, giving Taupin credit as an effort to earn Taupin his first publishing royalties). The B-side is "Here's to the Next Time", an Elton John composition. "I've Been Loving You" was not originally included on any album and the single was withdrawn shortly after its release. Neither side appeared on any official album release until the 1992 Rare Masters box set (which featured previously unreleased stereo mixes of both).

The single is extremely rare. An even rarer 4-song EP, released only in Portugal, contained two additional songs: "Thank You for All Your Loving" (written by John and then bandmate Caleb Quaye) and "Angel Tree" (the first true release of a John/Taupin composition).

According to John's YouTube channel, the single's B-side, "Here's to the Next Time", was recorded at DJM studios in late 1967.

== Wednesday cover version ==
"Loving You Baby"
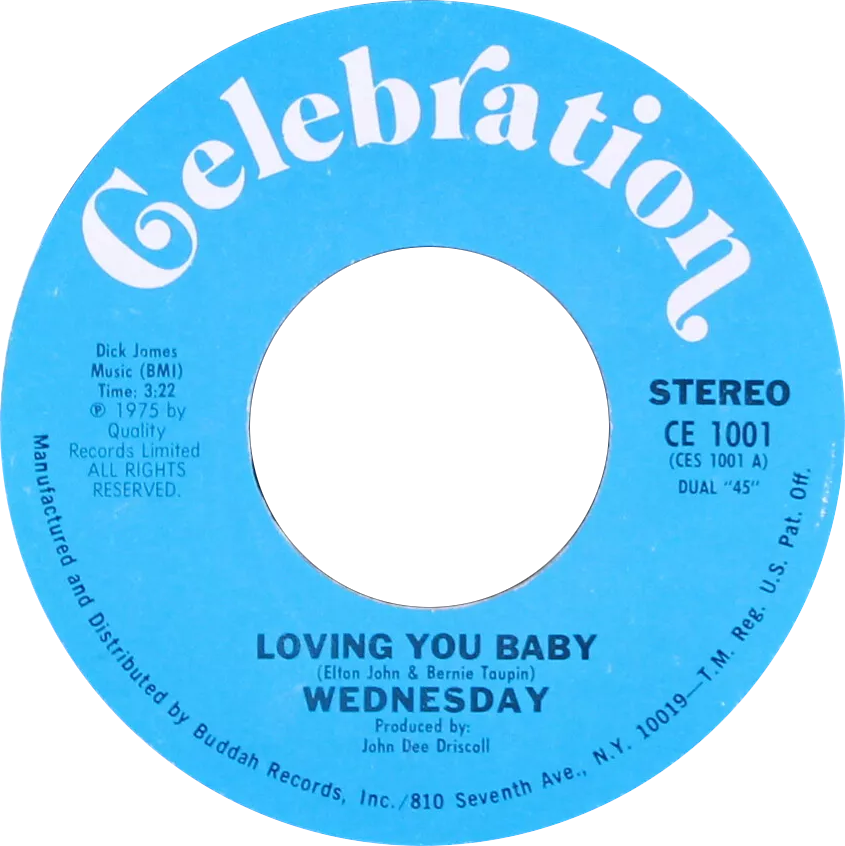
- Side A of the US retail single

Single by Wednesday
- B-side: "Here's to the Next Time" (Canada); "Don't Let Me Wait Too Long" (U.S.)
- Released: March 1976
- Recorded: 1975
- Genre: Pop
- Length: 3:22
- Label: Skyline (Canada); Celebration (U.S.)
- Songwriters: Elton John, Bernie Taupin
- Producer: John Dee Driscoll

Wednesday singles chronology
"Here Today Gone Tomorrow" (1975)	"Loving You Baby" (1976)	"Doing the Best That I Can" (1976)

In 1976, Canadian band Wednesday covered the song under the title "Loving You Baby". It was a substantial hit in their native country, peaking at No. 6 for two weeks on the Canadian singles chart. It is ranked as the 78th biggest Canadian hit of 1976.

=== Chart history ===
==== Weekly charts ====
Chart (1976)	Peak position
Canada RPM Top Singles	6

==== Year-end charts ====
Chart (1976)	Rank
Canada	78

== Other cover versions ==
- On 24 May 1968 (shortly after John's release), Edwin Bee released it as a single, marking the first cover version of an Elton John composition.
- Jack Bedient & the Chessmen, a popular party band based in and around California, Nevada, and the Pacific northwest in the 1960s, released a version of the song in 1969. Bedient & the Chessmen recorded and released numerous singles and albums during that time, and disbanded in the early '70s.
