= Looking Up (Elton John song) =

2015 song by Elton John

Single by Elton John

from the album Wonderful Crazy Night
- Released: 22 October 2015
- Recorded: 2015
- Genre: Rock
- Length: 3:13 (single version); 4:07 (album version)
- Label: Virgin EMI; Island
- Songwriter(s): Elton John; Bernie Taupin
- Producer(s): Elton John; T-Bone Burnett

Elton John singles chronology
"Can't Stay Alone Tonight" (2014)	"Looking Up" (2015)	"Wonderful Crazy Night" (2015)

"Looking Up" is a song by British musician Elton John and lyricist Bernie Taupin, performed by John. It was released on 22 October 2015 as the first single from John's thirtieth studio album Wonderful Crazy Night.

== Background ==
John had simple instructions for Taupin, telling Rolling Stone, "I just said that I even wanted the slow songs to be optimistic. I wanted to make a happy record. 'Joyous' was the word I chose. Not happy, joyous. I said I want it to feel joyous from beginning to end, and even the slow songs should be joyous."

== Music ==
"Looking Up" is written in A major and is an upbeat rock song with a positive vibe meant to bring light to balance out the darkness present in the world today.

== Charts ==
=== Weekly charts ===
Chart (2015–2016)	Peak position
US Adult Contemporary (Billboard)	12

=== Year-end charts ===
Chart (2016)	Position
US Adult Contemporary (Billboard)	36
