= Skyline Pigeon =

1969 song by Elton John

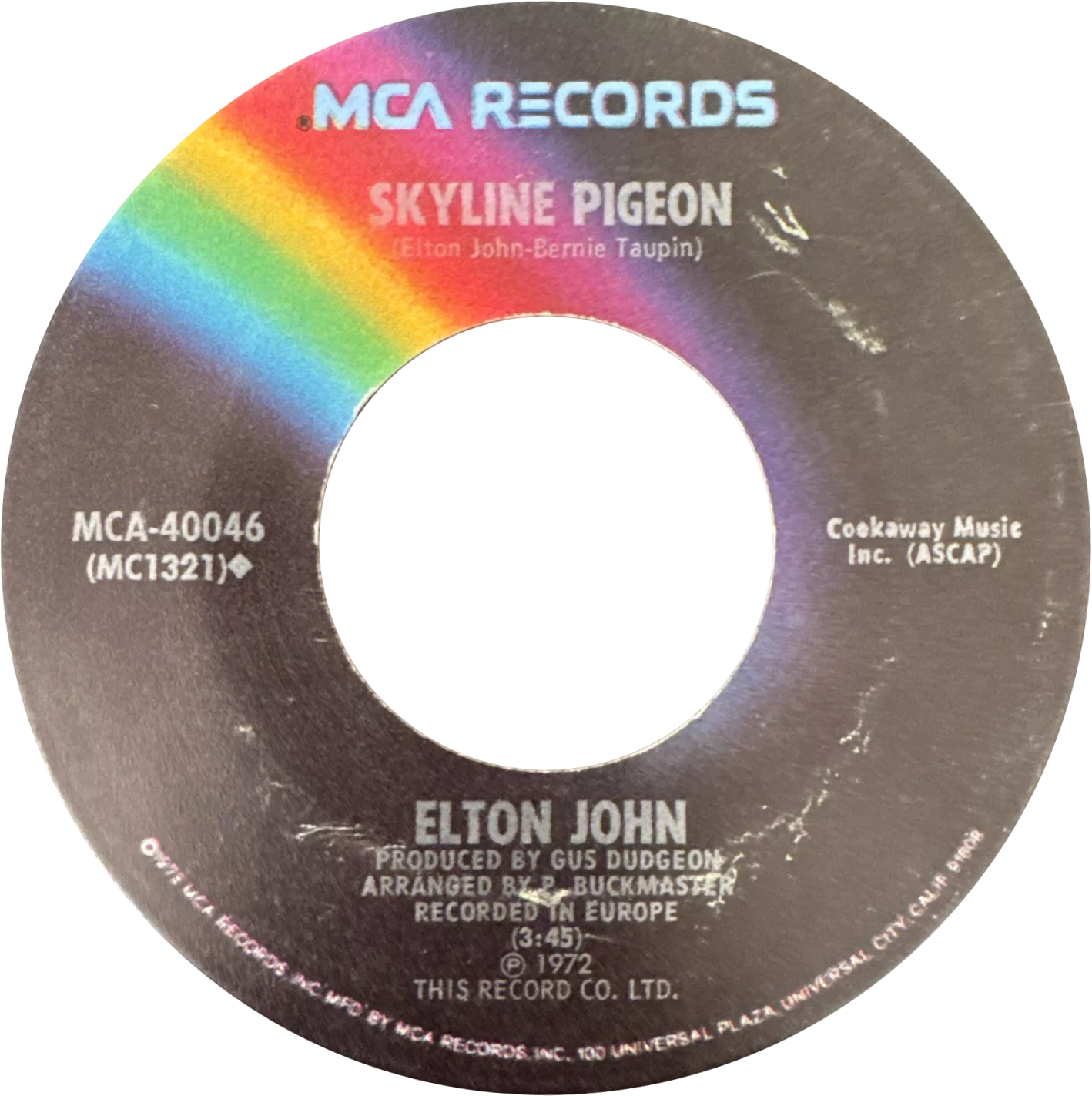
- One of side-B labels of the US single

Song by Elton John

from the album Empty Sky
- Released: 3 June 1969 (UK); 26 March 1973 (US); 21 March 1980 (US)
- Recorded: Original: DJM Studios, December 1968 – April 1969; Remake: Strawberry Studios, France, June 1972
- Length: 3:37 (1969); 3:53 (1972)
- Label: DJM; MCA (US/Canada: 1975)
- Songwriters: Elton John; Bernie Taupin
- Producers: Steve Brown (1969); Gus Dudgeon (1972)

Audio
- "Skyline Pigeon" (1972) on YouTube

"Skyline Pigeon" is a song by British musician Elton John and lyricist Bernie Taupin, and performed by John. It is the eighth track on John's debut studio album Empty Sky. It was originally released by Guy Darrell and Roger James Cooke simultaneously as a single in August 1968.

== Musical structure ==
The original recording from the Empty Sky album has John on harpsichord and organ. It is the only track on the album featuring only John and no other musicians. He wrote the song in the style of a hymn.

The lyrics of the song are metaphorical – describing a pigeon that is flying high and free having been released from a metal cage by a human hand.

== 1972 version ==
In 1972, John re-recorded the song with his band (Dee Murray, Nigel Olsson and Davey Johnstone) during the sessions for Don't Shoot Me I'm Only the Piano Player. The new recording used piano instead of harpsichord, and strings and oboe arranged by Paul Buckmaster. Originally issued as the B-side of the hit single "Daniel", it first appeared on CD in 1988 as part of the DJM issue of the Lady Samantha compilation album, then a few years later in the US and abroad on the 1992 Mercury release Rare Masters, and as a bonus track on the 1995 reissue of Don't Shoot Me I'm Only the Piano Player. The 1972 version of "Skyline Pigeon" appears again on the third CD of John's 2017 compilation box set Diamonds.

According to John's official website, the 1972 recording of "Skyline Pigeon" was particularly popular in Brazil, where it was used on the soundtrack of the television soap opera Carinhoso. It was the fourth most popular song of 1973 in Brazil.

Overall, the 1972 version has become the more familiar of the two to audiences owing to its appearance on various compilation albums as well as its first appearance as the B-side of Daniel.

== Performances ==
"Skyline Pigeon" was played on the radio as early as 1968. It was the most popular song during the very early period of John's musical career, yet it was not released as a single. It is the most performed live and best known track from the Empty Sky album. The song was performed live in various eras and venues throughout John's career, mainly in Britain, and frequently during his solo shows and pairings with the percussionist Ray Cooper. John has said he regards "Skyline Pigeon" as one of the first "great" songs that he and Taupin wrote. Following the death of his friend Ryan White from AIDS in 1990, he performed the song at his funeral on a grand piano, although he played Roland Piano on tour and in the studio at the time.

Apart from its earlier appearances on record, a live, solo piano version recorded at the Royal Festival Hall in London during summer 1974 was also included as the opening number on the "Here" side of the Here and There album in 1976, a place it retained in the 1995 2-CD expanded version remixed by the album's original producer, Gus Dudgeon. It was also released on Volume 1 of two EltonJohn.com limited-edition CDs recorded live in Madison Square Garden, as part of a series of solo performances John gave in October 1999. The song received a brief revival during a UK tour in 2009.

The 1972 version was a hit in Brazil. A live performance from 17 January 2009 was broadcast on TV along with the rest of an entire concert John performed in São Paulo, Brazil. Again in Brazil in 2011, he played the song during a concert at Rock in Rio in front of 150,000 people in Rio de Janeiro, on 23 September. During the 2013 tour he played the song again in São Paulo, on 27 February, and in Porto Alegre, on 5 March.

A 1968 piano demo version of the song was included on CD 4: Rarities, Part Two of John's 2021 boxed set, Jewel Box.

== Personnel ==
Original version:

- Elton John – harpsichord, organ, vocals

1972 version:

- Elton John – piano, vocals
- Davey Johnstone – acoustic guitar
- Dee Murray – bass guitar
- Nigel Olsson – drums
- Paul Buckmaster – orchestral arrangements

== In popular culture ==
The original version, with its notable harpsichord, was used as the closing-credit music in the 2018 film The Favourite.

== Cover versions ==
It was covered by Deep Feeling in 1970 (a band of which Guy Darrell was a member), Dana, Judith Durham on her 1971 solo album Climb Ev'ry Mountain, and Gene Pitney on his Pitney '75 album.

A popular song in the Philippines, it was covered by several artists, including Lani Misalucha on her Reminisce album.
