= The Diving Board =

Studio album by Elton John
- Released: 13 September 2013
- Recorded: January 2012–January 2013
- Studio: The Village and Olympic Studios (Los Angeles, California)
- Length: 57:45
- Label: Capitol (US/Canada); Mercury
- Producer: T Bone Burnett

Elton John chronology
| Good Morning to the Night (2012) | The Diving Board (2013) | Wonderful Crazy Night (2016) |

Singles from The Diving Board
- 1. "Home Again" Released: 24 June 2013; 2. "Mexican Vacation (Kids in the Candlelight)" Released: 28 August 2013; 3. "Can't Stay Alone Tonight" Released: March 2014

The Diving Board is the twenty-ninth studio album by British musician Elton John. It is the second of his studio releases since 1979's Victim of Love without any of his regular Elton John Band members. The album was released in the United Kingdom on 16 September 2013 and debuted at No. 3 on the UK Albums Chart, his highest-charting studio album in his home country since 2001's Songs from the West Coast, and at No. 4 on the Billboard 200. It is also his highest-charting solo album in the United States since Blue Moves in 1976.

The album's premiere single, "Home Again", was released on 24 June 2013, the same day the album became available for pre-order. On 28 August 2013, a video for "Mexican Vacation (Kids in the Candlelight)" was released on YouTube.

== Production ==
The album was written by Elton John and Bernie Taupin and produced in Los Angeles by The Union producer T Bone Burnett. Burnett suggested that John return to the piano, bass, and drums format of his very early years and the result, John says, is "the most exciting solo record I've done in a long, long time." The Diving Board was initially written in two days.

The album's release date was pushed back; though the record was originally planned for release in the fall of 2012, it was revealed on Taupin's website that it would instead be released in February 2013 for promotional reasons. Later, it was pushed back again.

It was revealed on 28 September 2012 in Rolling Stone magazine that John was dissatisfied with the balance on the album and that he had started to write more new songs for the album. He believed that many of the songs had a theme and that he wanted to write more songs after sitting on the project for so long.

During a concert at the Perth Arena in Perth, Australia on 10 November 2012 for his 40th Anniversary of the Rocket Man tour, John revealed that The Diving Board's release would be pushed back further, to May 2013. The delay in release was because John was to record more material for the album with Burnett in January 2013.

On 8 January 2013 it was revealed by Taupin's website that the title of the album had been changed from The Diving Board to Voyeur.

An article on Billboard published on 23 February 2013 revealed that the release date had once again been pushed back, this time until September 2013; the title of the album was back to The Diving Board again. The article also revealed the revised track list, which includes four new songs mixed in with the original material. A song originally stated for release on the album, titled "5th Avenue", had been dropped. John called the revised album "The most piano-oriented album of my career" and said "It's my most adult album". In total, the album's release had been pushed back four times.

The album's premiere single "Home Again" was released on 24 June 2013, the same day the album became available for pre-order.

On 28 August 2013, a video for "Mexican Vacation (Kids in the Candlelight)" was released on YouTube, being the album's second single.

== Reception ==
Professional ratings
Aggregate scores
| Source | Rating |
|---|---|
| Metacritic | 71/100 |
Review scores
| Source | Rating |
| AllMusic | 3/5 stars |
| The Guardian | 4/5 stars |
| The Independent | 5/5 stars |
| Los Angeles Times | 3/4 stars |
| Rolling Stone | 4/5 stars |

=== Critical ===
The Diving Board received generally positive reviews from music critics. At Metacritic, which assigns a normalised rating out of 100 to reviews from mainstream critics, the album received an average score of 71, which indicates "generally favorable reviews", based on 24 reviews.

Many critics praise the album as a "great return to form" and one of John's best albums of recent years and of his career. Alan Light of Rolling Stone gave the album a four star review commending its spare instrumentation and focus, saying that John has "regained his sense of musical possibility and taken a brave, graceful jump". Robert Hilburn, who famously reviewed John's American debut at the Troubadour in Los Angeles, praised The Diving Board's "finely crafted and deeply moving" songs that celebrate the past in a "fresh and revealing" manner. Hilburn goes on to say that if these songs had been played at the Troubadour in 1970, John would still have been "showered with applause and acclaim". Stephen Thomas Erlewine of AllMusic was less enthusiastic. In a mixed review, he stated that the album is an "exceptional idea in theory; in practice it is ever so slightly formless."

=== Commercial ===
In the United Kingdom, The Diving Board reached No. 3 on the UK Albums Chart on its first week of release behind indie rock band Arctic Monkeys' AM and Swedish dance music producer Avicii's True, selling 22,000 copies in its first week. The album was certified Silver by the British Phonographic Industry on 10 January 2014, signifying sales of 60,000 copies in the UK. In the United States, the album debuted at No. 4 on the Billboard 200 albums chart on its first week, with 47,000 copies sold. It is Elton John's 18th top 10 album on the chart. As of December 2015, the album has sold 150,000 copies in the US. It also debuted at No. 7 on the Canadian Albums Chart.

The single "Can't Stay Alone Tonight" became Elton John's 70th song to appear on the Adult Contemporary chart in the US, further extending his record for the most appearances on that chart that first began with "Your Song" in 1970.

=== Accolades ===
Rolling Stone placed the album at No. 25 on its list of the 50 Best Albums of 2013.

== Track listing ==
All lyrics are written by Bernie Taupin; all music is composed by Elton John.

The Diving Board track listing
| No. | Title | Length |
|---|---|---|
| 1. | "Oceans Away" | 3:58 |
| 2. | "Oscar Wilde Gets Out" | 4:35 |
| 3. | "A Town Called Jubilee" | 4:30 |
| 4. | "The Ballad of Blind Tom" | 4:12 |
| 5. | "Dream #1" (instrumental) | 0:40 |
| 6. | "My Quicksand" | 4:47 |
| 7. | "Can't Stay Alone Tonight" | 4:48 |
| 8. | "Voyeur" | 4:16 |
| 9. | "Home Again" | 5:01 |
| 10. | "Take This Dirty Water" | 4:25 |
| 11. | "Dream #2" (instrumental) | 0:43 |
| 12. | "The New Fever Waltz" | 4:38 |
| 13. | "Mexican Vacation (Kids in the Candlelight)" | 3:34 |
| 14. | "Dream #3" (instrumental) | 1:37 |
| 15. | "The Diving Board" | 5:59 |
| Total length: | | 57:45 |

== Personnel ==
=== Musicians ===
- Elton John – acoustic piano, vocals (1–4, 6–10, 12, 13, 15)
- Keefus Ciancia – keyboards (2–4, 6–10, 12)
- Larry Goldings – Hammond B3 organ (15)
- Doyle Bramhall II – guitars (3, 10)
- Raphael Saadiq – bass (2–4, 6–8, 10, 12–15)
- David Piltch – Arco bass (9)
- Jay Bellerose – drums (2–4, 6–10, 12–15)
- Jack Ashford – tambourine (3, 4, 7, 8, 10, 13)
- George Bohanon – baritone horn (9), trombone (12, 15), euphonium (12, 15)
- Bruce Fowler – trombone (9)
- Ira Nepus – trombone (12, 15)
- Chuck Findley – flugelhorn (9)
- Darrell Leonard – flugelhorn (9, 12, 15), horn arrangements (9, 12, 15, trumpet (12)
- William Roper – tuba (9, 12, 15)
- Stjepan Hauser – cello (2, 4, 12)
- Luka Šulić – cello (2, 4, 12)
- Bill Maxwell – BGV arrangements (3, 4, 7, 10, 13)
- Bill Cantos – backing vocals (3, 4, 7, 10, 13)
- Alvin Chea – backing vocals (3, 4, 7, 13)
- Carmel Echols – backing vocals (3, 10, 13)
- Judith Hill – backing vocals (3, 10, 13)
- Perry Morgan – backing vocals (3, 4, 7, 13)
- Louis Price – backing vocals (3, 4, 7, 13)
- Rose Stone – backing vocals (10)

=== Production ===
- T Bone Burnett – producer
- Jason Wormer – recording, mixing
- Jeff Gartenbaum – second engineer
- Chris Owens – second engineer, assistant mix engineer
- Vanessa Parr – second engineer
- Zachary Dawes – assistant mix engineer, equipment technician
- Gavin Lurssen – mastering at Lurssen Mastering (Hollywood, California)
- Carl Lieberman – piano technician
- Adrian Collee – project manager
- Ivy Skoff – production coordinator, contractor
- John Eidsvoog – music transcription
- Julie Eidsvoog – music transcription
- Tony King – creative director
- Mat Maitland – art direction, design
- Tim Barber – photography
- Johnny Barbis for Rocket Music Entertainment Group – management for Elton John
- Larry Jenkins for LJ Entertainment – management for T Bone Burnett

== Charts ==
Chart performance for The Diving Board
| Chart (2013) | Peak position |
|---|---|
| Australian Albums (ARIA) | 26 |
| Austrian Albums (Ö3 Austria) | 13 |
| Belgian Albums (Ultratop Flanders) | 33 |
| Belgian Albums (Ultratop Wallonia) | 20 |
| Canadian Albums (Billboard) | 7 |
| Croatian Western Albums | 9 |
| Czech Albums Chart | 11 |
| Danish Albums (Hitlisten) | 6 |
| Dutch Albums (Album Top 100) | 22 |
| French Albums (SNEP) | 29 |
| German Albums (Offizielle Top 100) | 11 |
| Irish Albums (IRMA) | 14 |
| Italian Albums (FIMI) | 12 |
| Japanese Albums (Oricon) | 100 |
| New Zealand Albums (RMNZ) | 20 |
| Norwegian Albums (VG-lista) | 10 |
| Scottish Albums (OCC) | 3 |
| Spanish Albums (Promusicae) | 36 |
| Swedish Albums (Sverigetopplistan) | 42 |
| Swiss Albums (Schweizer Hitparade) | 7 |
| UK Albums (OCC) | 3 |
| US Billboard 200 | 4 |
| US Indie Store Album Sales (Billboard) | 6 |

== Certifications ==
| Region | Certification | Certified units/sales |
|---|---|---|
| United Kingdom (BPI) | Silver | 60,000^{*} |
^{*} Sales figures based on certification alone.

== Release history ==
| Region | Date | Format(s) | Label | Catalog |
|---|---|---|---|---|
| Australia | 13 September 2013 | CD, LP, digital download | Mercury Records | 3744867 |
| United Kingdom | 16 September 2013 | CD, LP, digital download | Mercury Records | 3744867 |
| United States/Canada | 24 September 2013 | CD, LP, digital download | Capitol Records | B0018688-02 |
