= Elton John and Tim Rice's Aida =

Soundtrack album by various artists
- Released: 23 March 1999
- Recorded: 1998–99
- Genres: Pop; musical theatre
- Length: 65:16
- Label: Rocket
- Producer: Phil Ramone (executive)

Elton John chronology
The Big Picture (1997)	Elton John and Tim Rice's Aida (1999)	The Muse (1999)

Singles from Elton John and Tim Rice's Aida
- 1. "Written in the Stars" Released: 22 February 1999

Professional ratings
Review scores
Source	Rating
AllMusic	2.5/5 stars
The Encyclopedia of Popular Music	3/5 stars

Elton John and Tim Rice's Aida is a 1999 concept album that contains songs with music by Elton John and lyrics by Tim Rice from (but predates the main production of) the 2000 musical Aida.

== Background ==
The album features Elton John performing the songs along with pop, country and R&B stars Janet Jackson, Tina Turner, Sting, Lenny Kravitz, Shania Twain, Boyz II Men, Spice Girls, James Taylor, LeAnn Rimes, Kelly Price, Lulu, Angelique Kidjo, and Dru Hill. Additionally, two tracks, "A Step Too Far" and "Elaborate Lives", feature the voices of Aida cast-members-to-be Heather Headley and Sherie Rene Scott, who would go on to play Aida and Amneris respectively. The album was certified gold in April 1999 by the RIAA.

Prior to the recordings being performed by other artists, John also recorded each song as a solo full production demo. These tracks did not make the album and have never been officially released but are readily available on YouTube.

"Written in the Stars", a duet with LeAnn Rimes, was released as a single, reaching No. 29 on the Billboard Hot 100 and No. 2 on the Adult Contemporary chart. The single was certified gold in April 1999 by the RIAA. "The Messenger" makes its only appearance here, as it would be cut from the Broadway production and consequently left off the cast album.

This record is sometimes known as the "concept album" for Aida, both because it came before the production and to distinguish it from the 2000 release of Elton John and Tim Rice's Aida: Original Broadway Cast Recording, a conventional original cast recording of the Broadway production.

== Track listing ==
All lyrics are written by Tim Rice; all music is composed by Elton John.

Elton John and Tim Rice's Aida
No.	Title	Producer(s)	Length
1.	"Another Pyramid" (performed by Sting)	Sly & Robbie; Sting	3:48
2.	"Written in the Stars" (performed by Elton John and LeAnn Rimes)	Peter Collins; Wilbur Rimes	4:17
3.	"Easy as Life" (performed by Tina Turner featuring Angelique Kidjo)	Jean Hebrail	5:12
4.	"My Strongest Suit" (performed by Spice Girls)	Stannard & Rowe; Phil Ramone	4:11
5.	"I Know the Truth" (performed by Elton John and Janet Jackson)	Jimmy Jam and Terry Lewis	5:35
6.	"Not Me" (performed by Boyz II Men)	Boyz II Men	4:52
7.	"Amneris' Letter" (performed by Shania Twain)	Robert John "Mutt" Lange	1:41
8.	"A Step Too Far" (performed by Elton John, Heather Headley and Sherie Scott)	Ramone	4:18
9.	"Like Father Like Son" (performed by Lenny Kravitz)	Kravitz	4:09
10.	"Elaborate Lives" (performed by Heather Headley)	Ramone	4:22
11.	"How I Know You" (performed by James Taylor)	Russel Kunkel; Nathaniel Kunkel	3:19
12.	"The Messenger" (performed by Elton John and Lulu)	Ramone	5:10
13.	"The Gods Love Nubia" (performed by Kelly Price)	Daryl Simmons	4:48
14.	"Enchantment Passing Through" (performed by Dru Hill)	Dru Hill	5:44
15.	"Orchestral Finale"	Ramone	3:37

== Personnel ==
- Abe Appleman – violin
- Baby Dave – keyboards
- Guy Babylon – keyboards, producer
- Toby Baker – bass
- Julien Barber – viola
- Diane Barere – cello
- Elena Barere – violin
- Jarod Barnes – percussion, drums
- David Barry – guitar
- Mark Berrow – violin
- Virgil Blackwell – clarinet, bass clarinet
- Jeff Bova – piano
- Boyz II Men – producer, performer
- John Bradbury – violin
- Avril Brown – violin
- Ed Calle – flute, saxophone
- Bob Carlisle – horn
- Clifford Carter – keyboards
- John Clark – horn
- Angela Clemmons-Patrick – background vocals
- Clem Clempson – guitar
- Tony Concepcion – trumpet
- Luis Conte – percussion
- David Daniels – cello
- Michael Davis – trombone
- Jae Deal – producer, bass, keyboards, arranger
- Jill Dell'Abate – tambourine, producer
- Dru Hill – producer, performer
- Sly Dunbar – drums, producer
- Jan Fairchild – engineer
- Larry Farrell – trombone
- David Finck – bass
- Barry Finclair – violin
- Simon Fischer – violin
- Helen Foli – violin
- Chevelle Franklyn – background vocals
- Roger Frisch – violin
- Julian Gallagher – guitar, programming
- Roger Garland – violin
- Wilfred Gibson – violin
- Diva Gray – background vocals
- Juliet Haffner – viola
- Heather Headley – vocals
- Carl Herrgesell – piano, harmonium
- Rebecca Hirsch – violin
- Christopher Hooker – oboe
- Nick Ingman – string arrangements
- Jean Ingraham – violin
- Janet Jackson – vocals
- Elton John – background vocals, musical director
- Jimmy Johnson – bass
- Tony Kadleck – trumpet
- Karen Kamon – background vocals
- Doug Katsaros – piano
- Zev Katz – bass, electric bass
- Jeff Kievet – trumpet
- Lauren Kinhan – background vocals
- Merilee Klemp – oboe
- Boguslaw Kostecki – violin
- Lenny Kravitz – acoustic guitar, bass, arranger, drums, electric guitar, background vocals, producer, timpani, horn arrangements, wurlitzer
- Russ Kunkel – percussion, producer
- Peter Lale – viola
- Carol Landon – viola
- Ann Leathers – violin
- Jeanne LeBlanc – cello
- Diane Lesser – horn, oboe
- Richard Locker – cello
- Martin Loveday – cello
- Lulu – performer
- Robert Lyn – keyboards
- Charles Mangold – background vocals
- Peter Mann – background vocals
- Rob Mathes – guitar, arranger, conductor, keyboards, string arrangements
- Scott Meeder – percussion
- Edgar Meyer – acoustic bass
- Kenny Mims – guitar
- Perry Montague-Mason – violin
- Anderson Moore – piano
- Rob Mounsey – conductor
- Jan Mullen – violin
- Caryl Paisner – cello
- Paul Peabody – violin
- Shawn Pelton – drums
- Julia Persitz – violin
- Anthony Pleeth – cello
- Sue Pray – viola
- Kelly Price – performer, vocal arrangement
- Jim Pugh – trombone
- LeAnn Rimes – performer
- Matt Rowe – keyboards, programming, producer
- Philippe Saisse – Fender Rhodes
- Frank Schaefer – cello
- Sherie René Scott – performer
- Mary Scully – bass
- Laura Sewell – cello
- Robbie Shakespeare – bass, producer
- Jackie Shave – violin
- Mark Orrin Shuman – cello
- Daryl Simmons – keyboards, producer, drum programming
- Pamela Sklar – flute
- Bob Smissen – viola
- Andy Snitzer – tenor sax
- Liz Sobieski – violin
- Spice Girls – performer
- Stokley – drums
- Byron Stripling – trumpet
- Marti Sweet – violin
- David Taylor – bass trombone
- James Taylor – guitar, vocals
- Vance Taylor – piano
- Dana Teboe – trombone
- Donna Tecco – violin
- Daria Tedeschi – violin
- Sabina Thatcher – viola
- David Tofani – flute, alto flute
- Darryl Tookes – background vocals
- Tina Turner – performer
- Shania Twain – performer
- Carol Webb – violin
- Ellen Westerman – cello
- Kate Wilkinson – viola
- James "D-Train" Williams – background vocals
- Lloyd "Gitsy" Willis – guitar
- Judy Witmer – viola
- Gavyn Wright – violin
- Craig Young – bass

=== Additional personnel ===
- Rob Albano – assistant engineer
- Glenn Barratt – mixing
- Joe Bates – assistant engineer
- Lee Blaske – string arrangements
- Paul Bogaev – producer
- Andy Bradfield – mixing
- Mark Browne – assistant Engineer
- Adrian Bushby – engineer
- Ralph Cacciurri – assistant engineer
- Steve "Barney" Cahse – engineer
- Barney Chase – engineer
- Peter Collins – producer
- Jake Davies – programming
- Mike Dy – assistant engineer
- Frank Filipetti – producer, engineer, mixing
- Dave Fisher – assistant engineer
- Jan Folkson – programming
- Jon Gals – mixing
- Jason Groucott – mixing assistant
- Michael Hanna – arranger
- Delroy "Dr. Marshall" Harrison – engineer
- Jean Hébrail – arranger, producer, engineer
- Steve Hodge – engineer, mixing
- John Holbrook – engineer, mixing
- Jimmy Jam – arranger, multi instruments, producer
- Pete Karem – assistant engineer
- Thom "TK" Kidd – engineer
- Angélique Kidjo – arranger
- Matt Knobel – engineer
- Nathaniel Kunkel – producer, engineer, mixing
- Robert John "Mutt" Lange – producer
- Pete Lewis – engineer
- Terry Lewis – arranger, multi instruments, producer
- Patrick Lindsay – mixing
- Kevin Lively – assistant engineer
- Chris Lord-Alge – mixing
- Bob Ludwig – mastering
- Mike Malak – engineer
- Terry Manning – engineer
- Steve Mazur – mixing assistant
- Garfield McDonald – engineer
- Chris Montan – producer
- Nathan Morris – arranger
- Wanyá Morris – arranger
- Rob Murphy – assistant engineer
- Jake Ninan – assistant engineer
- Richard Pandiscio – artwork, art Direction
- Todd Parker – assistant engineer
- Dave Pensado – mixing
- Greg Pinto – assistant engineer
- Phil Ramone – producer, executive producer
- Chris Ribando – assistant engineer
- Tim Rice – lyricist, liner notes
- Alexander Richbourg – drum programming
- Olle Romo – engineer
- Sisqó – arranger
- Ivy Skoff – producer
- Xavier Smith – assistant engineer, mixing assistant
- Richard Stannard – producer
- Shawn Stockman – arranger
- Pat Thrall – programming, digital editing, electronic editor
- Fred Vaughn – choir arrangement
- Stephanie Vonarx – assistant engineer
- Paul Waller – programming
- Ron Warshow – assistant engineer
- James "Big Jim" Wright – arranger

== Charts ==
Chart (1999)	Peak position
Austrian Albums (Ö3 Austria)	9
Belgian Albums (Ultratop Wallonia)	26
Estonian Albums (Eesti Top 10)	4
French Albums (SNEP)	24
German Albums (Offizielle Top 100)	23
Norwegian Albums (VG-lista)	12
Scottish Albums (Official Charts)	44
Swiss Albums (Schweizer Hitparade)	13
UK Albums (Official Charts)	29

== Certifications ==
Region	Certification	Certified units/sales
Austria (IFPI Austria)	Gold	25,000^{*}
Norway (IFPI Norway)	Gold	25,000^{*}
United States (RIAA)	Gold	500,000^{^}
^{*} Sales figures based on certification alone.^{^} Shipments figures based on certification alone.
