= The Muse (soundtrack) =

The Muse Original Motion Picture Soundtrack

Soundtrack album by Elton John
- Released: 24 August 1999
- Genre: Orchestral
- Length: 36:14
- Label: Rocket; Island
- Producer: Guy Babylon; Michael T. Ryan

Elton John chronology
Elton John and Tim Rice's Aida (1999)	The Muse Original Motion Picture Soundtrack (1999)	The Road to El Dorado (2000)

Professional ratings
Review scores
Source	Rating
The Encyclopedia of Popular Music	2/5 stars

The Muse Original Motion Picture Soundtrack is the soundtrack for the film The Muse, released by British musician Elton John in 1999 through The Rocket Record Company and Island Records. The album is a departure for John, as it mainly contains the orchestrated score for the film, which he wrote in its entirety. The only vocal tracks are the title track, which was co-written with longtime lyricist Bernie Taupin, and a remix of the title track, remixed by Jermaine Dupri.

It was John's third soundtrack following the release of the "Friends" Original Soundtrack Recording in 1971 and The Lion King Original Motion Picture Soundtrack in 1994. It was preceded by Elton John and Tim Rice's Aida, a concept album that was released in early 1999, to draw attention to the Aida Broadway musical.

== Track listing ==
All tracks written by Elton John, except for "The Muse" (music by John, lyrics by Bernie Taupin).

1. "Driving Home" – 1:50
2. "Driving to Universal" – 0:18
3. "Driving to Jack's" – 1:06
4. "Walk of Shame" – 1:34
5. "Better Have a Gift" – 2:07
6. "The Wrong Gift" – 3:01
7. "The Aquarium" – 2:11
8. "Are We Laughing" – 1:07
9. "Take a Walk with Me" – 1:30
10. "What Should I Do?" – 1:11
11. "Back to the Aquarium" – 0:54
12. "Steven Redecorates" – 2:43
13. "To the Guesthouse" – 0:50
14. "The Cookie Factory" – 0:54
15. "Multiple Personality" – 2:23
16. "Sarah Escapes" – 1:44
17. "Back to Paramount" – 0:44
18. "Meet Christine" – 1:33
19. "The Muse" – 4:23
20. "The Muse (Remix)" (remixed by Jermaine Dupri) – 4:21

== Credits ==
Adapted from the album's liner notes:

- Elton John – composition
- Bernie Taupin – lyrics on "The Muse"
- Guy Babylon – production, orchestral arrangements
- Michael T. Ryan – production
- Geoffrey Alexander – score orchestration, conducting
- Simon Rhodes – score recording engineer
- Isobel Griffiths – orchestra contractor
- Gavyn Wright – concert master
- Jenny O'Grady – choirmaster
- Lisa Brown – music coordinator
- Matt Dunkley – copyist
- John Richards – soundtrack mix engineer
- Andy Green – additional engineering
- Greg Calbi – mastering
