= Empty Sky =

Studio album by Elton John
- Released: 6 June 1969
- Recorded: November 1968 – April 1969
- Studios: Dick James, London
- Genre: Soft rock
- Length: 41:11 (original release); 54:53 (1995 reissue)
- Labels: DJM (UK); MCA (US)
- Producer: Steve Brown

Elton John chronology
Empty Sky (1969)	Elton John (1970)

U.S. release (1975)

Empty Sky is the debut studio album by British singer-songwriter Elton John, released in the United Kingdom on 6 June 1969. Although imported UK copies of the album were available in the United States, Empty Sky was not officially issued in the US until January 1975 (on MCA Records), with different cover art, well after John's fame had been established internationally.

== Background ==
Recorded during the winter of 1968 and spring of 1969 at DJM Records' 8-track studio, Empty Sky is the only album from the early phase of Elton John's career not produced by Gus Dudgeon; instead, production was handled by DJM staff member and close associate Steve Brown. The album was released in the UK in both stereo and mono, the latter now being a rare collector's item.

John plays harpsichord on several tracks, including "Skyline Pigeon", which John has described as being "the first song Bernie [Taupin] and I ever got excited about that we ever wrote."

John used musicians who were friends of either him or Brown or both. Guitarist Caleb Quaye and drummer Roger Pope, both at the time members of the band Hookfoot, played on many of the tracks. (Quaye and Pope would rejoin John a few years later as part of his studio and touring band behind Rock of the Westies in 1975 and Blue Moves in 1976.) Tony Murray from the Troggs played bass. Empty Sky is the first appearance with John of the then Plastic Penny and Spencer Davis Group member Nigel Olsson, who played drums on "Lady What's Tomorrow?" (Olsson and his fellow Spencer Davis bandmate, bassist Dee Murray, would soon join John as his early-1970s touring band.) Also listed in the production credits is Clive Franks, who would later produce John's live sound in concert for much of his touring career, and would occasionally co-produce with John on albums such as A Single Man and 21 at 33. The original sleeve design was done by David Larkham (billed as "Dave"), who would go on to create designs for John and other artists.

"Skyline Pigeon" is the most popular and best-known song on the album, which John, albeit infrequently, performed as part of his live shows. The more definitive version of "Skyline Pigeon" featuring an orchestra and piano backing in place of harpsichord was recorded for 1973's Don't Shoot Me I'm Only the Piano Player, and initially appeared as the B-side of "Daniel" in 1973. Another appearance of the song was in 1976, when a version recorded in London in 1974 was featured as the opening track on the Here and There live LP and its 1995 CD reissue. The only other song from the album that was played live was the title track, "Empty Sky", which was included at various stops on John's 1975 Rock of the Westies Tour.

Although John has since called the album naïve, he does have fond memories of making the record. These include walking home from recording at 4 a.m. and lodging at The Salvation Army Regent Hall on Oxford Street, which was run by Steve Brown's father. "I remember when we finished work on the title track – it just floored me. I thought it was the best thing I'd ever heard in my life," John recalled. He later recalled that he was "unsure what style I was going to be ... [maybe what] Leonard Cohen sounds like."

== Reception ==
Professional ratings
Review scores
Source	Rating
AllMusic	2/5 stars
Disc & Music Echo	3/4 stars
The Encyclopedia of Popular Music	2/5 stars

A contemporary review from Disc & Music Echo said, "Can't help feeling that the lyrics could still do with a little more intensity, a little less youthful pretension. But that's just carping because the music is so nice and pretty that you can't really put it down. Well worth a good, deep listen." AllMusic's retrospective review showed a subdued reaction to the material, concluding: "There aren't any forgotten gems on Empty Sky, but it does suggest John's potential."

== Track listing ==
All tracks are written by Elton John and Bernie Taupin.

Side one
No.	Title	Length
1.	"Empty Sky"	8:29
2.	"Val-Hala"	4:11
3.	"Western Ford Gateway"	3:15
4.	"Hymn 2000"	4:29

Side two
No.	Title	Length
1.	"Lady What's Tomorrow"	3:09
2.	"Sails"	3:45
3.	"The Scaffold"	3:18
4.	"Skyline Pigeon"	3:37
5.	"Gulliver / Hay Chewed / Reprise"	6:58
Total length:		41:11

Bonus tracks (1995 Mercury and 1996 Rocket reissue)
No.	Title	Length
10.	"Lady Samantha"	3:02
11.	"All Across the Havens"	2:52
12.	"It's Me That You Need"	4:04
13.	"Just Like Strange Rain"	3:44
Total length:		54:53

Notes

- "Val-Hala" was titled "Valhalla" on the 1975 US reissue.
- "Hay Chewed" was titled "It's Hay-Chewed" on the 1995 CD reissue.

== Personnel ==
- Elton John – vocals, piano, organ, Hohner Pianet, harpsichord
- Caleb Quaye – electric guitar, acoustic guitar, congas
- Tony Murray – bass guitar
- Roger Pope – drums, percussion
- Nigel Olsson – drums on "Lady What's Tomorrow"
- Don Fay – saxophone, flute
- Graham Vickery – harmonica

Production

- Steve Brown – producer
- Frank Owen – engineer
- Clive Franks – tape operator, whistling
- Dave Larkham – sleeve design, illustration
- Jim Goff – sleeve production
- Tony Brandon – original sleeve notes
- David Symonds – original sleeve notes
- Gus Dudgeon – liner notes
- John Tobler – liner notes

== Charts ==
=== Weekly charts ===
Weekly chart performance for Empty Sky
Chart (1975)	Peak position
Canada Top Albums/CDs (RPM)	30
US Billboard 200	6

=== Year-end charts ===
Year-end chart performance for Empty Sky
Chart (1975)	Position
US Billboard 200	178
