= Wonderful Crazy Night =

Studio album by Elton John
- Released: 5 February 2016
- Recorded: January–April 2015
- Studio: The Village, Los Angeles, California
- Length: 41:15
- Label: Mercury; Virgin EMI; Island
- Producer: T Bone Burnett; Elton John

Elton John chronology
The Diving Board (2013)	Wonderful Crazy Night (2016)	Diamonds (2017)

Singles from Wonderful Crazy Night
- 1. "Looking Up" Released: 22 October 2015; 2. "Wonderful Crazy Night" Released: 15 December 2015; 3. "Blue Wonderful" Released: 5 January 2016; 4. "In the Name of You" Released: 29 January 2016; 5. "A Good Heart" Released: 25 May 2016

Wonderful Crazy Night is the thirtieth studio album by British musician Elton John. It was released on 5 February 2016. It is John's first album since 2006's The Captain & the Kid to feature the Elton John Band and was written and recorded in 17 days. John's long-standing percussionist, Ray Cooper, makes his first appearance on any of John's albums since Made in England in 1995. This is Kim Bullard's first appearance on keyboards, replacing Guy Babylon, and Matt Bissonette replaced Bob Birch on bass. The album debuted at number eight on the U.S Billboard 200 with sales of 58,000 album-equivalent units sold.

== Critical reception ==
Professional ratings
Aggregate scores
Source	Rating
Metacritic	70/100
Review scores
Source	Rating
AllMusic	3/5 stars
The Guardian	4/5 stars
The Independent	4/5 stars
Rolling Stone	4/5 stars

Wonderful Crazy Night received generally positive reviews from music critics. At Metacritic, which assigns a normalised rating out of 100 to reviews from mainstream critics, the album received an average score of 70, which indicates "generally favorable reviews", based on 17 reviews.

=== Accolades ===
Publication	Accolade	Year	Rank	Ref.
Rolling Stone	50 Best Albums of 2016	2016	39	

== Track listing ==
All tracks are written by Elton John and Bernie Taupin

No.	Title	Length
1.	"Wonderful Crazy Night"	3:13
2.	"In the Name of You"	4:33
3.	"Claw Hammer"	4:22
4.	"Blue Wonderful"	3:37
5.	"I've Got 2 Wings"	4:35
6.	"A Good Heart"	4:50
7.	"Looking Up"	4:06
8.	"Guilty Pleasure"	3:38
9.	"Tambourine"	4:17
10.	"The Open Chord"	4:04
Total length:		41:15

Deluxe edition bonus tracks
No.	Title	Length
11.	"Free and Easy"	3:55
12.	"England and America"	3:51
Total length:		49:01

Super deluxe edition bonus tracks
No.	Title	Length
11.	"Free and Easy"	3:55
12.	"Children's Song"	3:49
13.	"No Monsters"	4:58
14.	"England and America"	3:51
Total length:		57:48

Target US and Japanese Deluxe edition bonus tracks
No.	Title	Length
11.	"Free and Easy"	3:55
12.	"England and America"	3:51
13.	"Looking Up" (live)	3:22
14.	"Wonderful Crazy Night" (live)	3:15
Total length:		55:38

== Personnel ==
=== Musicians ===
- Elton John – vocals, acoustic piano
- Kim Bullard – keyboards
- Davey Johnstone – guitars, harmony vocals (3, 4, 6, 10)
- Matt Bissonette – bass, harmony vocals (3, 4, 6, 10)
- Nigel Olsson – drums, harmony vocals (3, 4, 6, 10)
- John Mahon – percussion, harmony vocals (3, 4, 6, 10)

Additional musicians

- T Bone Burnett – guitar solo (4)
- Ray Cooper – tambourine (3, 5, 6, 8, 9)
- Tom Peterson – baritone saxophone (6)
- Joe Sublett – tenor saxophone (6)
- Jim Thomson – tenor saxophone (6)
- John Grab – trombone (6)
- Nick Lane – trombone (6)
- William Roper – tuba (6)
- Allen Fogle – French horn (6)
- Dylan Hart – French horn (6)
- Gabe Witcher – horn arrangements and conductor (6)
- Ken Stacey – harmony vocals (3, 8)

=== Production ===
- Elton John – producer
- T Bone Burnett – producer
- Jason Wormer – recording, mixing
- Gabriel Burch – second engineer
- Jeff Gartenbaum – second engineer
- Vanessa Parr – second engineer, additional engineer
- Alex Williams – second engineer
- Mike Piersante – additional editing
- Gavin Lurssen – mastering at Lurssen Mastering (Hollywood, California)
- Carl Lieberman – piano technician
- Rick Salazar – equipment technician
- Adrian Collee – project manager
- Kylie Kempster – production assistant
- Ivy Skoff – production coordinator, contractor
- Toby King – creative director
- Mat Maitland – art direction, design
- Joseph Guay – studio photography
- Juergen Teller – Elton John photography
- Rocket Entertainment – management for Elton John
- Ken Levitan for Vector Management – management for T Bone Burnett

== Charts ==
Chart performance for Wonderful Crazy Night
Chart (2016)	Peak position
Australian Albums (ARIA)	11
Austrian Albums (Ö3 Austria)	8
Belgian Albums (Ultratop Flanders)	26
Belgian Albums (Ultratop Wallonia)	26
Canadian Albums (Billboard)	18
Danish Albums (Hitlisten)	32
Dutch Albums (Album Top 100)	43
French Albums (SNEP)	35
German Albums (Offizielle Top 100)	10
Irish Albums (IRMA)	41
Italian Albums (FIMI)	15
New Zealand Albums (RMNZ)	11
Norwegian Albums (VG-lista)	17
Scottish Albums (OCC)	5
Spanish Albums (Promusicae)	32
Swedish Albums (Sverigetopplistan)	15
Swiss Albums (Schweizer Hitparade)	7
UK Albums (OCC)	6
US Billboard 200	8
US Indie Store Album Sales (Billboard)	5
