= Hookfoot =

English rock band

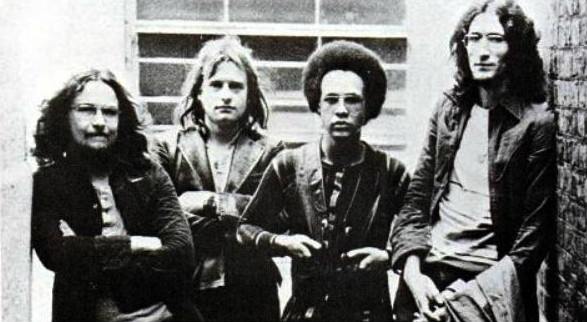
The band in 1971

Hookfoot are an English rock band, active from 1969 to 1974. The band was formed by Caleb Quaye (guitars, piano and vocals) and three fellow DJM Records session musicians, Ian Duck (vocals, guitars and harmonica/ born 1944 in Gosport, Hampshire), Roger Pope (drums/ born 20 March 1947 in Whitstable, Kent, died 18 September 2013 in Southampton) and David Glover (bass).

The band were also backing musicians for Elton John, appearing together on most of his early recordings for DJM. Fred Gandy (bass - formerly of Bluesology) replaced David Glover, who left after the release of the second album. Other, occasional members of the band were Bob Kulick (guitar, vocals), Mick Grabham (bass) and Peter Ross (harmonica, vocals).

== Discography ==
=== Albums ===
- A Piece of Pye (1969)
- Turn the Radio On (1970)
- Hookfoot (1971) – AUS No. 48
- Good Times A' Comin' (1972)
- Communication (1973)
- Roaring (1974)
- Headlines (1975) – double compilation album, including their cover of The Byrds' "So You Want to Be a Rock 'n' Roll Star" and four unreleased tracks
- Live In Memphis (recorded 1972, released 1990)

=== Singles ===
- "The Way of the Musician" / "Hookfoot" (1969)
- "Don't Let It Bring You Down" / "Coombe Gallows" (1971)
- "Sweet Sweet Funky Music" / "The Opener" (1972)
- "Freedom (Nobody's Shoes)" / "Heart to Heart Talking" / "Red Man" (1972)
- "So You Want to Be a Rock 'n' Roll Star" / "Mr. Money" (1973)
