= Victim of Love (Elton John album) =

Studio album by Elton John
- Released: 12 October 1979
- Recorded: August 1979
- Studios: Musicland (Munich, Germany); Rusk Sound (Hollywood, California, US)
- Genres: Disco; pop
- Length: 35:45
- Labels: MCA (US); Rocket (UK)
- Producer: Pete Bellotte

Elton John chronology
The Thom Bell Sessions (1979)	Victim of Love (1979)	21 at 33 (1980)

Singles from Victim of Love
- 1. "Victim of Love" Released: 21 September 1979; 2. "Johnny B. Goode" Released: December 1979

Victim of Love is the thirteenth studio album by British musician Elton John. It is a disco album, released in 1979 shortly after the peak of disco's popularity. It was not critically or commercially well-received, and is John's third lowest charting album to date in the US, after 1986's Leather Jackets and 1985's Ice on Fire.

The title track of the album was moderately successful as a single, reaching No. 31 on the US Billboard Hot 100, No. 38 in Australia and No. 46 in Canada. It also peaked at No. 11 on the Canadian Adult Contemporary chart. In addition, all the tracks on the album reached No. 55 on the US Billboard Disco Top 100 chart.

Apart from an appearance on the Australian television series Countdown (he was also a comedy regular on the show during the 1980s), John did little marketing for Victim of Love. He did not tour to promote the album.

== Background ==
At under 36 minutes, the album is the shortest of Elton John's career, and is atypical of his recording career in several respects. He neither wrote the songs nor played piano or keyboards, only providing the vocals. Elton John admitted in 1998 that he used the album's disco direction as a means of "leaping on a bandwagon". It was his first album without any of his original Elton John Band members, which would not happen again until his 2010 collaboration with Leon Russell, The Union. As of 2026, it is one of only two studio albums (along with A Single Man) without contributions from lyricist Bernie Taupin.

"Strangers", the B-side of the single of the album's title track, appeared as a bonus track on the 1998 Mercury reissue of John's previous album, A Single Man, because it was recorded during those sessions.

When the album was released as a CD in the 1980s, the track breaks were incorrect. The first 45 seconds of "Spotlight" was part of the previous track, and similar errors occurred in other tracks. In 2003, the album was reissued in a digitally remastered format, with those problems corrected.

== Critical reception ==
Professional ratings
Review scores
Source	Rating
AllMusic	1.5/5 stars
Christgau's Record Guide	C−
The Encyclopedia of Popular Music	2/5 stars
MusicHound Rock: The Essential Album Guide	2/5 stars
The Rolling Stone Album Guide	1/5 stars

The album was panned by critics. The New York Times noted that "John still has an appealing pop-music baritone, but there's precious little in the way of individuality here." In ranking all of John's studio albums, Matt Springer of Ultimate Classic Rock placed the album at the bottom of the list. The Rolling Stone Album Guide called it the "nadir" of John's recorded output.

Aside from the single edit of the title track appearing on the deluxe edition of Diamonds, none of the album’s songs appear on any of John’s numerous greatest hits or career retrospective releases. However, "Warm Love in a Cold World" did appear on a Pickwick compilation "Love Songs".

== Track listing ==
Side one

1. "Johnny B. Goode" (Chuck Berry) – 8:06
2. "Warm Love in a Cold World" (Pete Bellotte, Stefan Wisnet, Gunther Moll) – 4:30 (3:22 on older pressings)
3. "Born Bad" (Bellotte, Geoff Bastow) – 5:16 (6:20 on older pressings)

Side two

1. "Thunder in the Night" (Bellotte, Michael Hofmann) – 4:40
2. "Spotlight" (Bellotte, Wisnet, Moll) – 4:24
3. "Street Boogie" (Bellotte, Wisnet, Moll) – 3:56
4. "Victim of Love" (Bellotte, Sylvester Levay, Jerry Rix) – 4:52 (5:02 on older pressings)

== Personnel ==
- Elton John – vocals
- Thor Baldursson – keyboards, arrangements
- Roy Davies – keyboards
- Craig Snyder – lead guitar
- Tim Cansfield – rhythm guitar
- Steve Lukather – guitar solo on "Warm Love in a Cold World" and "Born Bad"
- Marcus Miller – bass
- Keith Forsey – drums
- Paulinho da Costa – percussion
- Lenny Pickett – saxophone on "Johnny B. Goode"
- Michael McDonald – backing vocals on "Victim of Love"
- Patrick Simmons – backing vocals on "Victim of Love"
- Stephanie Spruill – backing vocals
- Julia Waters Tillman – backing vocals
- Maxine Waters Willard – backing vocals

Production

- Pete Bellotte – producer
- Peter Luedmann – engineer, mixdown engineer
- Hans Menzel – assistant engineer
- Carolyn Tapp – assistant mixdown engineer
- Roman Olearczuk – technical engineer
- Brian Gardner – mastering at Allen Zentz Mastering (Hollywood, California)
- Trevor Veitch – music contractor
- Jerry Simpson – production coordinator
- Joe Black – project coordinator
- David P. Bailey – photography
- Jubilee Graphics – design

== Charts ==
Chart performance for Victim of Love
Chart (1979)	Peak position
Australian Albums (Kent Music Report)	20
Canada Top Albums/CDs (RPM)	28
New Zealand Albums (RMNZ)	44
Norwegian Albums (VG-lista)	18
UK Albums (Official Charts)	41
US Billboard 200	35

== Certifications and sales ==
Region	Certification	Certified units/sales
Australia (ARIA)	Gold	20,000^{^}
Canada (Music Canada)	Gold	50,000^{^}
^{^} Shipments figures based on certification alone.
