= Caleb Quaye =

English guitarist and studio musician

- Also known as: Caleb
- Born: 9 October 1948 (age 77); London, England
- Origin: England
- Genres: Rock, pop music, jazz fusion
- Occupation: Musician
- Instrument: Guitar
- Years active: 1960s–present
- Label: DJM Records

Caleb Quaye (born 9 October 1948) is an English rock guitarist and studio musician best known for his work in the 1960s and 1970s with Elton John, Mick Jagger, Pete Townshend, Paul McCartney, Hall & Oates and Ralph McTell, and also toured with Shawn Phillips in the 1970s. He is the son of singer/pianist Cab Kaye, younger brother of musician Terri Quaye, and elder half-brother of singer Finley Quaye.

== Early career ==
Quaye was a member of local band The SoundCasters (also referred to as the Sound Castles) while at school. He spent several years as a member of Long John Baldry's backing band, Bluesology, which also featured a keyboard player named Reg Dwight, who would soon become known as Elton John in tribute to fellow Bluesology members Elton Dean and Long John Baldry. When Bluesology disbanded in 1967, Quaye released a single under the name Caleb called "Baby Your Phrasing is Bad" b/w "Woman of Distinction" (1967, Philips Records). In 1969 he served as guitarist for the one-off "flower power" pop band Argosy (which also included Dwight, Roger Hodgson, and Nigel Olsson) on their single, "Mr. Boyd" b/w "Imagine".

Starting in 1969, Quaye played guitar supporting Elton John at live concerts around the local London area, with what eventually became the nucleus of Hookfoot for sporadic shows. The live support work continued until Elton formed his original touring band in the spring of 1970, the trio featuring Dee Murray and Nigel Olsson.

In April 1970, Quaye formed the band Hookfoot with Ian Duck, Roger Pope and David Glover, all of whom were DJM Records house musicians and had backed Elton's earliest live performances. The group's self-titled debut album was a mix of rock and jazz and included songs by Quaye and Duck, in addition to Stephen Stills and Neil Young covers. Quaye played guitar and keyboards on this album. The group's follow-up record Good Times a-Comin' was a more straight-ahead rock album; a third album was Communication, and the last album was titled Roarin'. A live album called Hookfoot Live in Memphis, recorded in 1973, was released later. The group disbanded in 1974, and Quaye stayed in the United States to work as a session musician. He is credited as a guitarist on Bill Quateman's 1973 debut album, Bill Quateman, and toured with Quateman in support of the album.

Quaye played guitar, bass and drums on "Forever's No Time at All", written and sung by Nicholls. It opened I Am, a 1972 album dedicated to Meher Baba also featuring Pete Townshend. Later that year, the song appeared on Townshend's solo debut Who Came First.

Quaye played guitar on the original demos for Joan Armatrading's debut album Whatever's for Us, which was released in November 1972. The demos were recorded by Gus Dudgeon at Marquee Studios, London.

Subsequently, Caleb Quaye was enlisted by Billy Nicholls to play lead guitar, bass, drums and keyboards on Love Songs, recorded in 1974 and released on GM Records.

== Elton John Band ==
Quaye first met Elton John in 1965, and in 1967 helped him to get studio time to record demos at Dick James' studio, where he worked as an engineer. They played together in the Bread and Beer Band, and Quaye produced John's first solo single.

Quaye played off and on for more than 10 years with John, both as a session player and later full band member, appearing on all of his earliest recordings and albums as a session player until the beginning of 1972, as well as being a member of Bluesology during 1967/68. He finally fully joined the Elton John Band in May 1975 for the Rock of the Westies and Blue Moves albums, as well as subsequent 1975/76 Elton tours.

In 2019, an old and previously unreleased song he co-wrote with Elton John in the late 1960s, "Thank You For All Your Loving", was featured in the film Rocketman.

== Hall & Oates ==
In 1977, Quaye, along with fellow Elton John Band members Kenny Passarelli and Roger Pope, joined Hall & Oates. This group recorded Livetime as well as the September 1978 release Along the Red Ledge. Quaye also played on Daryl Hall's first solo album (recorded in 1977 but released in 1980) which also featured Passarelli, Pope, and Robert Fripp (King Crimson).

== Christian faith and music ministry ==
Quaye embraced the Christian faith in 1982, becoming a musician/evangelist. From 1986 to 1995, he was an Associate Pastor, Chief Musician and Staff Evangelist at the Foursquare Church in Pasadena, California. Since 1996, Quaye has served as the National Worship Director for the Foursquare denomination, ministering throughout the United States, England and Europe.

Quaye used to serve as adjunct faculty at LIFE Pacific College in San Dimas, California, teaching music and worship leadership. He is also one of the elders in the church that meets in the chapel on campus.

In February 2006, Vision Publishing released Quaye's autobiography, A Voice Louder Than Rock & Roll, in paperback. The book is credited to "Caleb Quaye with Dale A. Berryhill".

From 2008 on, Quaye released two jazz-rock fusion CDs. The first one was One Night in San Dimas, with Out of the Blue as the 2010 follow-up album; both of which he plays his signature model Brazen guitar, loaded with Seymour Duncan pick-ups.

He now serves at The Church on the Way in Van Nuys, California.

== Collaborations ==
With Joan Baez

- Recently (Gold Castle, 1987)

With The Beach Boys

- Keepin' the Summer Alive (CBS Records, 1980)

With Teresa Brewer

- Teresa Brewer In London (Flying Dutchman, 1973)

With Peter Criss

- Let Me Rock You (Casablanca Records, 1982)

With Charlie Dore

- Listen! (Chrysalis Records, 1981)

With Yvonne Elliman

- Food of Love (Purple Records, 1973)

With Daryl Hall

- Sacred Songs (RCA Records, 1980)

With Hall & Oates

- Along the Red Ledge (RCA Records, 1978)

With Jennifer Holliday

- Feel My Soul (Geffen, 1983)

With Bruce Johnston

- Going Public (Columbia Records, 1977)

With Elton John

- Empty Sky (DJM Records, 1969)
- Elton John (DJM Records, 1970)
- Tumbleweed Connection (DJM Records, 1970)
- Madman Across the Water (Uni Records, 1971)
- Rock of the Westies (MCA Records, 1975)
- Blue Moves (Rocket, 1976)
- Regimental Sgt. Zippo (Rocket/Mercury/EMI, 2021)

With Al Kooper

- New York City (You're a Woman) (Columbia Records, 1971)

With Liza Minnelli

- Tropical Nights (Columbia Records, 1977)

With Keb' Mo'

- Rainmaker (Chocolate City, 1980)

With Harry Nilsson

- Nilsson Schmilsson (RCA Victor, 1971)

With Lou Reed

- Lou Reed (RCA Records, 1972)

With Brenda Russell

- Two Eyes (Warner Bros. Records, 1983)

With Dusty Springfield

- White Heat (Casablanca Records, 1982)

With Bernie Taupin

- Taupin (DJM Records, 1971)
