= List of songs with lyrics by Bernie Taupin =

Bernie Taupin is an English lyricist, poet, and singer. In his long-term collaboration with Elton John, he has written the lyrics for most of John's songs. Over the years, he has written songs for a variety of other artists, including Heart, Starship, Melissa Manchester, Alice Cooper, Rod Stewart and Richie Sambora.

This is a list of titles whose lyrics Bernie Taupin has written or co-written.

== Recorded by Elton John ==
Taupin and John began writing together in 1967 and, aside from brief periods apart working on other projects, the two have been collaborating ever since. Taupin has also released four solo albums.

=== 1960s ===
Song	Album	Year
All Across the Havens	Lady Samantha (B-side)	1969
Just Like Strange Rain	It's Me That You Need (B-side)	1969
It's Me That You Need	Single	1969
Lady Samantha	Single	1969
Empty Sky	Empty Sky	1969
Gulliver	Empty Sky	1969
Hymn 2000	Empty Sky	1969
Lady, What's Tomorrow?	Empty Sky	1969
Sails	Empty Sky	1969
The Scaffold	Empty Sky	1969
Skyline Pigeon	Empty Sky	1969
Valhalla	Empty Sky	1969
Western Ford Gateway	Empty Sky	1969

=== 1970s ===
Song	Album	Year
I Need You to Turn To	Elton John	1970
Your Song	Elton John	1970
Sixty Years On	Elton John	1970
Border Song	Elton John	1970
No Shoestrings on Louise	Elton John	1970
The King Must Die	Elton John	1970
First Episode at Hienton	Elton John	1970
Take Me to the Pilot	Elton John	1970
The Greatest Discovery	Elton John	1970
Thank You Mama	Elton John outtake	1970
I'm Going Home	Elton John outtake	1970
All the Way Down to El Paso	Elton John outtake	1970
Son of Your Father	Tumbleweed Connection	1970
Where to Now, St. Peter?	Tumbleweed Connection	1970
My Father's Gun	Tumbleweed Connection	1970
Talking Old Soldiers	Tumbleweed Connection	1970
Country Comfort	Tumbleweed Connection	1970
Come Down in Time	Tumbleweed Connection	1970
Burn Down the Mission	Tumbleweed Connection	1970
Ballad of a Well-Known Gun	Tumbleweed Connection	1970
Amoreena	Tumbleweed Connection	1970
Bad Side of the Moon	Border Song (B-side)	1970
Into the Old Man's Shoes	Your Song (B-side)	1970
Rock and Roll Madonna	Single	1970
All the Nasties	Madman Across the Water	1971
Goodbye	Madman Across the Water	1971
Holiday Inn	Madman Across the Water	1971
Indian Sunset	Madman Across the Water	1971
Levon	Madman Across the Water	1971
Razor Face	Madman Across the Water	1971
Madman Across the Water	Madman Across the Water	1971
Rotten Peaches	Madman Across the Water	1971
Tiny Dancer	Madman Across the Water	1971
Amy	Honky Château	1972
Honky Cat	Honky Château	1972
Hercules	Honky Château	1972
I Think I'm Going to Kill Myself	Honky Château	1972
Slave	Honky Château	1972
Salvation	Honky Château	1972
Mona Lisas and Mad Hatters	Honky Château	1972
Mellow	Honky Château	1972
Rocket Man (I Think It's Going to Be a Long, Long Time)	Honky Château	1972
Susie (Dramas)	Honky Château	1972
All the Girls Love Alice	Goodbye Yellow Brick Road	1973
The Ballad of Danny Bailey (1909–34)	Goodbye Yellow Brick Road	1973
Bennie and the Jets	Goodbye Yellow Brick Road	1973
Saturday Night's Alright (For Fighting)	Goodbye Yellow Brick Road	1973
Screw You (Young Man's Blues)	Goodbye Yellow Brick Road	1973
Social Disease	Goodbye Yellow Brick Road	1973
Sweet Painted Lady	Goodbye Yellow Brick Road	1973
Candle in the Wind	Goodbye Yellow Brick Road	1973
Dirty Little Girl	Goodbye Yellow Brick Road	1973
Roy Rogers	Goodbye Yellow Brick Road	1973
I've Seen That Movie Too	Goodbye Yellow Brick Road	1973
This Song Has No Title	Goodbye Yellow Brick Road	1973
Your Sister Can't Twist (But She Can Rock 'n' Roll)	Goodbye Yellow Brick Road	1973
Funeral for a Friend	Goodbye Yellow Brick Road	1973
Goodbye Yellow Brick Road	Goodbye Yellow Brick Road	1973
Grey Seal	Goodbye Yellow Brick Road	1973
Harmony	Goodbye Yellow Brick Road	1973
Jamaica Jerk-Off	Goodbye Yellow Brick Road	1973
Love Lies Bleeding	Goodbye Yellow Brick Road	1973
Crocodile Rock	Don't Shoot Me (I'm Only the Piano Player)	1973
Blues for Baby and Me	Don't Shoot Me (I'm Only the Piano Player)	1973
Midnight Creeper	Don't Shoot Me (I'm Only the Piano Player)	1973
Teacher I Need You	Don't Shoot Me (I'm Only the Piano Player)	1973
I'm Going to Be a Teenage Idol	Don't Shoot Me (I'm Only the Piano Player)	1973
Daniel	Don't Shoot Me (I'm Only the Piano Player)	1973
Elderberry Wine	Don't Shoot Me (I'm Only the Piano Player)	1973
Have Mercy on the Criminal	Don't Shoot Me (I'm Only the Piano Player)	1973
High Flying Bird	Don't Shoot Me (I'm Only the Piano Player)	1973
Texan Love Song	Don't Shoot Me (I'm Only the Piano Player)	1973
Ho Ho Ho (Who'd Be a Turkey At Christmas?)	Step into Christmas (B-side)	1973
Jack Rabbit	Saturday Night's Alright for Fighting (B-side)	1973
Step Into Christmas	Single	1973
Whenever You're Ready (We'll Go Steady Again)	Saturday Night's Alright (For Fighting) (B-side)	1973
Cold Highway	The Bitch Is Back (B-side)	1974
Don't Let the Sun Go Down on Me	Caribou	1974
Dixie Lily	Caribou	1974
The Bitch Is Back	Caribou	1974
Ticking	Caribou	1974
You're So Static	Caribou	1974
Pinky	Caribou	1974
Grimsby	Caribou	1974
I've Seen the Saucers	Caribou	1974
Stinker	Caribou	1974
Solar Prestige a Gammon	Caribou	1974
Sick City	Don't Let the Sun Go Down on Me (B-side)	1974
Medley (Yell Help/Wednesday Night/Ugly)	Rock of the Westies	1975
Billy Bones and the White Bird	Rock of the Westies	1975
Dan Dare (Pilot of the Future)	Rock of the Westies	1975
Feed Me	Rock of the Westies	1975
Grow Some Funk of Your Own	Rock of the Westies	1975
Hard Luck Story	Rock of the Westies	1975
Island Girl	Rock of the Westies	1975
Street Kids	Rock of the Westies	1975
I Feel Like a Bullet (In the Gun of Robert Ford)	Rock of the Westies	1975
Philadelphia Freedom	Single	1975
Captain Fantastic and the Brown Dirt Cowboy	Captain Fantastic and the Brown Dirt Cowboy	1975
Bitter Fingers	Captain Fantastic and the Brown Dirt Cowboy	1975
Better Off Dead	Captain Fantastic and the Brown Dirt Cowboy	1975
Curtains	Captain Fantastic and the Brown Dirt Cowboy	1975
Dogs in the Kitchen	Captain Fantastic and the Brown Dirt Cowboy	1975
(Gotta Get A) Meal Ticket	Captain Fantastic and the Brown Dirt Cowboy	1975
Someone Saved My Life Tonight	Captain Fantastic and the Brown Dirt Cowboy	1975
Tell Me When the Whistle Blows	Captain Fantastic and the Brown Dirt Cowboy	1975
Tower of Babel	Captain Fantastic and the Brown Dirt Cowboy	1975
We All Fall in Love Sometimes	Captain Fantastic and the Brown Dirt Cowboy	1975
Writing	Captain Fantastic and the Brown Dirt Cowboy	1975
House of Cards	Someone Saved My Life Tonight (B-side)	1975
Bite Your Lip (Get Up and Dance)	Blue Moves	1976
Boogie Pilgrim	Blue Moves	1976
Between Seventeen and Twenty	Blue Moves	1976
Cage the Songbird	Blue Moves	1976
Chameleon	Blue Moves	1976
Crazy Water	Blue Moves	1976
Idol	Blue Moves	1976
If There's a God in Heaven (What's He Waiting For?)	Blue Moves	1976
One Horse Town	Blue Moves	1976
Shoulder Holster	Blue Moves	1976
Where's the Shoorah?	Blue Moves	1976
The Wide-Eyed and Laughing	Blue Moves	1976
Someone's Final Song	Blue Moves	1976
Sorry Seems to Be the Hardest Word	Blue Moves	1976
Tonight	Blue Moves	1976
Snow Queen	Don't Go Breaking My Heart (B-side)	1976
Ego	Single	1978
I Cry at Night	Part-Time Love (B-side)	1978
Lovesick	Song for Guy (B-side)	1978

=== 1980s ===
Song	Album	Year
Chasing the Crown	21 at 33	1980
Two Rooms at the End of the World	21 at 33	1980
White Lady White Powder	21 at 33	1980
Love So Cold	Dear God (B-side)	1980
White Man Danger	Sartorial Eloquence (Don't Ya Wanna Play This Game No More?) (B-side)	1980
Heels of the Wind	The Fox	1981
Fascist Faces	The Fox	1981
Just Like Belgium	The Fox	1981
The Fox	The Fox	1981
Fools in Fashion	Nobody Wins (B-side)	1981
Tortured	Chloe (B-side)	1981
All Quiet on the Western Front	Jump Up!	1982
Empty Garden (Hey Hey Johnny)	Jump Up!	1982
I Am Your Robot	Jump Up!	1982
Spiteful Child	Jump Up!	1982
Where Have All the Good Times Gone?	Jump Up!	1982
Hey Papa Legba	Blue Eyes (B-side)	1982
The Retreat	Princess (B-side)	1982
Cold as Christmas (In the Middle of the Year)	Too Low for Zero	1983
Crystal	Too Low for Zero	1983
I Guess That's Why They Call It the Blues	Too Low for Zero	1983
I'm Still Standing	Too Low for Zero	1983
Whipping Boy	Too Low for Zero	1983
One More Arrow	Too Low for Zero	1983
Saint	Too Low for Zero	1983
Too Low for Zero	Too Low for Zero	1983
Religion	Too Low for Zero	1983
Kiss the Bride	Too Low for Zero	1983
Breaking Hearts (Ain't What It Used to Be)	Breaking Hearts	1984
Burning Buildings	Breaking Hearts	1984
In Neon	Breaking Hearts	1984
Slow Down Georgie (She's Poison)	Breaking Hearts	1984
Did He Shoot Her?	Breaking Hearts	1984
Who Wears These Shoes?	Breaking Hearts	1984
Sad Songs (Say So Much)	Breaking Hearts	1984
Restless	Breaking Hearts	1984
Li'l 'Frigerator	Breaking Hearts	1984
Candy by the Pound	Ice on Fire	1985
Cry to Heaven	Ice on Fire	1985
This Town	Ice on Fire	1985
Tell Me What the Papers Say	Ice on Fire	1985
Too Young	Ice on Fire	1985
Soul Glove	Ice on Fire	1985
Satellite	Ice on Fire	1985
Shoot Down the Moon	Ice on Fire	1985
Nikita	Ice on Fire	1985
Angeline	Leather Jackets	1986
Go It Alone	Leather Jackets	1986
Paris	Leather Jackets	1986
Hoop of Fire	Leather Jackets	1986
Leather Jackets	Leather Jackets	1986
I Fall Apart	Leather Jackets	1986
Gypsy Heart	Leather Jackets	1986
Heartache All Over the World	Leather Jackets	1986
Billy and the Kids	Slow Rivers (B-side)	1986
Lord of the Flies	Slow Rivers (B-side)	1986
The Camera Never Lies	Reg Strikes Back	1988
Mona Lisas and Mad Hatters (Part Two)	Reg Strikes Back	1988
Goodbye Marlon Brando	Reg Strikes Back	1988
Japanese Hands	Reg Strikes Back	1988
Since God Invented Girls	Reg Strikes Back	1988
Poor Cow	Reg Strikes Back	1988
I Don't Wanna Go On with You Like That	Reg Strikes Back	1988
Heavy Traffic	Reg Strikes Back	1988
A Word in Spanish	Reg Strikes Back	1988
Town of Plenty	Reg Strikes Back	1988
Rope Around a Fool	I Don't Wanna Go On with You Like That (B-side)	1988
Blue Avenue	1989 Sleeping with the Past	1989
Sleeping with the Past	1989 Sleeping with the Past	1989
Stone's Throw from Hurtin'	1989 Sleeping with the Past	1989
Club at the End of the Street	1989 Sleeping with the Past	1989
Sacrifice	1989 Sleeping with the Past	1989
Durban Deep	1989 Sleeping with the Past	1989
I Never Knew Her Name	1989 Sleeping with the Past	1989
Whispers	1989 Sleeping with the Past	1989
Healing Hands	1989 Sleeping with the Past	1989
Dancing in the End Zone	Healing Hands (B-side)	1989
Nice and Slow	The Complete Thom Bell Sessions	1989
Love Is a Cannibal	Sacrifice (B-side)	1989

=== 1990s ===
Song	Album	Year
Easier to Walk Away	To Be Continued	1990
I Swear I Heard the Night Talking	To Be Continued	1990
Made for Me	To Be Continued	1990
You Gotta Love Someone	To Be Continued	1990
Medicine Man	Nobody's Child: Romanian Angel Appeal	1990
When a Woman Doesn't Want You	The One	1992
Emily (The Weight of Angels)	The One	1992
Sweat It Out	The One	1992
Understanding Women	The One	1992
Whitewash County	The One	1992
The Last Song	The One	1992
The North	The One	1992
On Dark Street	The One	1992
Simple Life	The One	1992
The One	The One	1992
Suit of Wolves	The One (B-side)	1992
Fat Boys and Ugly Girls	The One (B-side)	1992
Belfast	Made in England	1995
Believe	Made in England	1995
Latitude	Made in England	1995
Lies	Made in England	1995
Pain	Made in England	1995
Please	Made in England	1995
House	Made in England	1995
Blessed	Made in England	1995
Made in England	Made in England	1995
Man	Made in England	1995
Cold	Made in England	1995
Red	Sol en Si	1995
No Valentines	Love Songs	1996
You Can Make History (Young Again)	Love Songs	1996
The Big Picture	The Big Picture	1997
The End Will Come	The Big Picture	1997
I Can't Steer My Heart Clear of You	The Big Picture	1997
If the River Can Bend	The Big Picture	1997
Live Like Horses	The Big Picture	1997
Long Way from Happiness	The Big Picture	1997
January	The Big Picture	1997
Love's Got a Lot to Answer For	The Big Picture	1997
Recover Your Soul	The Big Picture	1997
Something About the Way You Look Tonight	The Big Picture	1997
Wicked Dreams	The Big Picture	1997
Candle in the Wind 1997	Single	1997
Wake Up Wendy	Chef Aid: The South Park Album	1998
Big Man in a Little Suit	Recover Your Soul (B-side)	1998
I Know Why I'm in Love	Recover Your Soul (B-side)	1998

=== 2000s ===
Song	Album	Year
American Triangle	Songs from the West Coast	2001
Ballad of the Boy in the Red Shoes	Songs from the West Coast	2001
Birds	Songs from the West Coast	2001
Dark Diamond	Songs from the West Coast	2001
I Want Love	Songs from the West Coast	2001
Look Ma, No Hands	Songs from the West Coast	2001
Love Her Like Me	Songs from the West Coast	2001
Mansfield	Songs from the West Coast	2001
The North Star	Songs from the West Coast	2001
The Emperor's New Clothes	Songs from the West Coast	2001
Original Sin	Songs from the West Coast	2001
The Wasteland	Songs from the West Coast	2001
This Train Don't Stop There Anymore	Songs from the West Coast	2001
All That I'm Allowed	Peachtree Road	2004
Too Many Tears	Peachtree Road	2004
Turn the Lights Out When You Leave	Peachtree Road	2004
Weight of the World	Peachtree Road	2004
Answer in the Sky	Peachtree Road	2004
I Can't Keep This from You	Peachtree Road	2004
My Elusive Drug	Peachtree Road	2004
I Stop and I Breathe	Peachtree Road	2004
They Call Her the Cat	Peachtree Road	2004
Freaks in Love	Peachtree Road	2004
Porch Swing in Tupelo	Peachtree Road	2004
It's Getting Dark in Here	Peachtree Road	2004
I Must Have Lost It on the Wind	The Captain & the Kid	2006
Blues Never Fade Away	The Captain & the Kid	2006
The Bridge	The Captain & the Kid	2006
The Captain and the Kid	The Captain & the Kid	2006
Just Like Noah's Ark	The Captain & the Kid	2006
And the House Fell Down	The Captain & the Kid	2006
Old '67	The Captain & the Kid	2006
Postcards from Richard Nixon	The Captain & the Kid	2006
Tinderbox	The Captain & the Kid	2006
Wouldn't Have You Any Other Way (NYC)	The Captain & the Kid	2006

=== 2010s onwards ===
Song	Album	Year
The Ballad of Blind Tom	The Diving Board	2013
Can't Stay Alone Tonight	The Diving Board	2013
The Diving Board	The Diving Board	2013
Home Again	The Diving Board	2013
Mexican Vacation (Kids in the Candlelight)	The Diving Board	2013
My Quicksand	The Diving Board	2013
The New Fever Waltz	The Diving Board	2013
Oceans Away	The Diving Board	2013
Oscar Wilde Gets Out	The Diving Board	2013
Take This Dirty Water	The Diving Board	2013
A Town Called Jubilee	The Diving Board	2013
Voyeur	The Diving Board	2013
Wonderful Crazy Night	Wonderful Crazy Night	2016
In the Name of You	Wonderful Crazy Night	2016
Claw Hammer	Wonderful Crazy Night	2016
Blue Wonderful	Wonderful Crazy Night	2016
I Got 2 Wings	Wonderful Crazy Night	2016
A Good Heart	Wonderful Crazy Night	2016
Looking Up	Wonderful Crazy Night	2016
Guilty Pleasure	Wonderful Crazy Night	2016
Tambourine	Wonderful Crazy Night	2016
The Open Chord	Wonderful Crazy Night	2016
Free and Easy	Wonderful Crazy Night	2016
England and America	Wonderful Crazy Night	2016
When I was Tealby Abbey	Regimental Sgt. Zippo	2021
And the Clock Goes Round	Regimental Sgt. Zippo	2021
Turn to Me	Regimental Sgt. Zippo	2021
Angel Tree	Regimental Sgt. Zippo	2021
Regimental Sgt. Zippo	Regimental Sgt. Zippo	2021
A Dandelion Dies in the Wind	Regimental Sgt. Zippo	2021
Nina	Regimental Sgt. Zippo	2021
Tartan Coloured Lady	Regimental Sgt. Zippo	2021
Hourglass	Regimental Sgt. Zippo	2021
Watching the Planes Go By	Regimental Sgt. Zippo	2021

== Recorded by Elton John and others ==
Song	Artist	Album	Year
Don't Go Breaking My Heart	Elton John and Kiki Dee	Single	1976
Donner Pour Donner	Elton John and France Gall	Les Aveux (B-side)	1980
Wrap Her Up	Elton John and George Michael	Ice on Fire	1985
Runaway Train	Elton John and Eric Clapton	The One	1992
The Power	Elton John and Little Richard	Duets	1993
A Woman's Needs	Elton John and Tammy Wynette	Duets	1993
Don't Go Breaking My Heart	Elton John and RuPaul	Duets	1993
Don't Let the Sun Go Down on Me	Elton John and George Michael	Duets	1993
Teardrops	Elton John and Lulu	Songs from the West Coast	2001
Hey Ahab	Elton John and Leon Russell	The Union	2010
Gone to Shiloh	Elton John and Leon Russell	The Union	2010
Eight Hundred Dollar Shoes	Elton John and Leon Russell	The Union	2010
Jimmie Rodgers' Dream	Elton John and Leon Russell	The Union	2010
Monkey Suit	Elton John and Leon Russell	The Union	2010
The Best Part of the Day	Elton John and Leon Russell	The Union	2010
I Should Have Sent Roses	Elton John and Leon Russell	The Union	2010
When Love is Dying	Elton John and Leon Russell	The Union	2010
My Kind of Hell	Elton John and Leon Russell	The Union	2010
Mandalay Again	Elton John and Leon Russell	The Union	2010
Never Too Old (To Hold Somebody)	Elton John and Leon Russell	The Union	2010
Cold Heart (PS1 Remix)	Elton John and Dua Lipa	The Lockdown Sessions	2021
The Rose of Laura Nyro	Elton John and Brandi Carlile	Who Believes in Angels?	2025
Little Richard's Bible	Elton John and Brandi Carlile	Who Believes in Angels?	2025
Swing for the Fences	Elton John and Brandi Carlile	Who Believes in Angels?	2025
Never Too Late	Elton John and Brandi Carlile	Who Believes in Angels?	2025
You Without Me	Elton John and Brandi Carlile	Who Believes in Angels?	2025
Who Believes in Angels?	Elton John and Brandi Carlile	Who Believes in Angels?	2025
The River Man	Elton John and Brandi Carlile	Who Believes in Angels?	2025
A Little Light	Elton John and Brandi Carlile	Who Believes in Angels?	2025
Someone to Belong To	Elton John and Brandi Carlile	Who Believes in Angels?	2025
When This Old World is Done with Me	Elton John and Brandi Carlile	Who Believes in Angels?	2025

== Recorded by Bernie Taupin ==
Song	Album	Year
Brothers Together	Taupin	1971
Birth	Taupin	1971
Conclusion	Taupin	1971
End of a Day	Taupin	1971
Sisters of the Cross	Taupin	1971
Solitude	Taupin	1971
The Visitor	Taupin	1971
When the Heron Wakes	Taupin	1971
To a Grandfather	Taupin	1971
Today's Hero	Taupin	1971
Rowston Manor	Taupin	1971
Ratcatcher	Taupin	1971
Flatters (A Beginning)	Taupin	1971
La Petite Marionette	Taupin	1971
Like Summer Tempests	Taupin	1971
The Whores of Paris	He Who Rides the Tiger	1980
Approaching Armageddon	He Who Rides the Tiger	1980
Blitz Babies	He Who Rides the Tiger	1980
Valley Nights	He Who Rides the Tiger	1980
Venezuela	He Who Rides the Tiger	1980
Lover's Cross	He Who Rides the Tiger	1980
Love (The Barren Desert)	He Who Rides the Tiger	1980
Monkey on My Back (The Last Run)	He Who Rides the Tiger	1980
Born on the Fourth of July	He Who Rides the Tiger	1980
Billy Fury	Tribe	1987
Citizen Jane	Tribe	1987
Conquistador	Tribe	1987
Corrugated Iron	Tribe	1987
Desperation Train	Tribe	1987
Friend of the Flag	Tribe	1987
Hold Back the Night	Tribe	1987
I Still Can't Believe That You're Gone	Tribe	1987
The New Lone Ranger	Tribe	1987
She Sends Shivers (with Martha Davis)	Tribe	1987
White Boys in Chains	Citizen Jane (B-side)	1987
Backbone	Friend of the Flag (B-side)	1987

== Recorded by Alice Cooper ==
Song	Album	Year
For Veronica's Sake	From the Inside	1978
From the Inside	From the Inside	1978
How You Gonna See Me Now	From the Inside	1978
Serious	From the Inside	1978
The Quiet Room	From the Inside	1978
Wish I Were Born in Beverly Hills	From the Inside	1978
Millie and Billie	From the Inside	1978
Inmates (We're All Crazy)	From the Inside	1978
Jackknife Johnny	From the Inside	1978
Nurse Rozetta	From the Inside	1978
No Tricks	How You Gonna See Me Now (B-side)	1978

== Recorded by Farm Dogs ==
Taupin was a member of the short-lived group, Farm Dogs, which released two albums in the mid-late 1990s:

Song	Album	Year
The Ballad of Dennis Hopper and Harry Dean	Last Stand in Open Country	1996
Barstool	Last Stand in Open Country	1996
Beautiful (I Don't Want to Be)	Last Stand in Open Country	1996
Bone of Contention	Last Stand in Open Country	1996
Burn This Bed	Last Stand in Open Country	1996
Cinderella '67	Last Stand in Open Country	1996
Last Stand in Open Country	Last Stand in Open Country	1996
In Paradise	Last Stand in Open Country	1996
Shameless	Last Stand in Open Country	1996
Pretty Bombs	Last Stand in Open Country	1996
Me and My Friends	Last Stand in Open Country	1996

== Recorded by other artists ==
Song	Artist	Album	Year
A Love That Will Never Grow Old	Emmylou Harris	Brokeback Mountain soundtrack	2005
The Ballad of Zero and the Tramp	John Anderson	You Can't Keep a Good Memory Down	1988
Broken Woman	China	China	1977
The Burn	Starship	Love Among the Cannibals	1989
Closer to the Edge	Bertín Osborne	Motivation	1989
Color Bar	Farm Dogs	Last Stand in Open Country	1996
Crimes of Passion	Public Domain	Radio Nights	1998
Dip Your Wings	Peter Cetera	World Falling Down	1992
Engine 19	Richie Sambora		2013
The Flowers Will Never Die	Ayshea		1975
Fly on the Wall	Exile	Shelter from the Night	1987
(For The) Working Girl	Melissa Manchester	For the Working Girl	1980
For Wanting You	Marianne Faithfull	Vagabond Ways	1999
Hard Lesson to Learn	Rod Stewart	Love Touch (B-side)	1986
Hey Ricky (You're a Low Down Heel)	Melissa Manchester	Hey Ricky	1982
I Can't Go On Living Without You	Dave Sealey		1969
I'm Never Gonna Break Your Heart	Kenny Passarelli	Single	1977
I Engineer	Animotion	Strange Behavior	1986
I Guess I'll Always Love You	Rod Stewart	Absolutely Live	1982
If I Weren't So Romantic, I'd Shoot You	Derringer	If I Weren't So Romantic, I'd Shoot You	1978
Into the Heartland	The Motels	Little Robbers	1984
Johnny and Mary	Melissa Manchester	Emergency	1983
Julie	Black Rose	Black Rose	1980
The Last Good Man in My Life	Kiki Dee	Lonnie and Josie (B-side)	1973
Let Me Be Your Car	Rod Stewart	Smiler	1974
Lonely School Year	The Hudson Brothers	Ba Fa	1975
Lonnie and Josie	Kiki Dee	Loving and Free	1973
Lover Come Back to Me	The Hudson Brothers	Totally Out of Control	1974
Love Rusts	Starship	Knee Deep in the Hoopla	1985
The Man Who Loved to Dance	Kiki Dee	First Thing in the Morning (B-side)	1977
Mystery D.J.	The Motels		1983
Never Give Up on a Dream	Rod Stewart	Tonight I'm Yours	1981
Planes	Colin Blunstone	Planes	1976
Remember	Donatella Rettore	Estasi Clamorosa	1981
Rock Me When He's Gone	Long John Baldry	It Ain't Easy	1971
The Rumour	Olivia Newton-John	The Rumour	1988
Satisfied	Rod Stewart	Body Wishes	1983
Savage	China	China	1977
Season of the Rain	Nite People	PM	1970
Sick Love	Red Hot Chili Peppers	The Getaway	2016
Snookeroo	Ringo Starr	Goodnight Vienna	1974
Sonny	Rod Stewart	Tonight I'm Yours	1981
Supercool	Kiki Dee	Loving and Free	1973
Taking the Sun from My Eyes	Ayshea		1968
The Tide Will Turn for Rebecca	Edward Woodward		1970
Turn to Me	Plastic Penny	Currency	1968
These Dreams	Heart	Heart	1985
Under Fire	New Frontier	New Frontier	1988
Weathering The Storm	Richie Sambora	Aftermath of the Lowdown	2012
We Built This City	Starship	Knee Deep in the Hoopla	1985
When the First Tear Shows	Tom Thumb		1969
When the Phone Stops Ringing	Eighth Wonder	Fearless	1987
White Rose	Melissa Manchester	Emergency	1983

== Soundtracks ==
Song	Production	Year
Friends	Friends	1971
Honey Roll	Friends	1971
Seasons	Friends	1971
Can I Put You On	Friends	1971
Michelle's Song	Friends	1971
The Muse	The Muse	1999
Stronger Than I Ever Was	Sherlock Gnomes	2011
Love Builds a Garden	Gnomeo & Juliet	2011
Never Too Late	Elton John: Never Too Late	2024

== Other songs ==
- 10 Soldater
- 12
- 1965
- Accents
- The Ace of Hearts and the Jack of Spades
- Across the River Thames
- Act of War
- Adult Music
- Aftermath
- Ain't We Bad in the Big City
- All I Want to do is Make Love to You
- All Or Nothing
- An Angel's Wing
- And the House Fell Down
- Anitta
- Answer in the Sky
- Are You Alright?
- Bad News Baby Darling
- Ball
- Bed of Nails
- Black Cat Crossing the Road
- Black on Blue
- Blood in the Dust
- Bobbie on the Backburner
- Bobby Goes Electric
- Bonnie's Gone Away
- The Bridge
- Bring Back the Magic
- Building a Bird
- But Then Again
- Calling it Christmas
- Caminaga Ella Tan Linda
- Cherokee D.J
- Child
- Chiquita
- Cowboy
- The Crack in the Sky
- Cry Willow Cry
- Culture Shock/Counter Clock
- Damn My Eyes
- Dance With Life (The Brilliant Light)
- Deal for Life
- Dear Ground
- Destiny
- Diamonds Won't Do it (But I Will)
- Did Anybody Sleep with Joan of Arc?
- Don't Be the Last to Know
- Du Far Ej Fa
- Du Far Ej Ga
- Dub Till You Drop
- Dup Songs
- The Eastern Bloc
- Emery Green
- En Sorgsen Sang
- First Verse
- Free to Believe
- Giardino Dell 'Amore
- Gimme Eight Seconds
- Ginseng Woman
- God Never Came Here
- Goin' North
- Going Blind
- Heart of an Angel
- The Heart of Every Girl
- Heart of Glass
- Hell
- How Long Lord (Before the Night Is Over?)
- How's Tomorrow?
- Hungry Eyes
- I Am Not the Enemy
- I Am the Hunter
- I Came to Dance
- I Have Slipped
- I Hypnotise
- I Must Have Lost It on the Wind
- If I Was a Country
- I'm a Working Man
- I'm Not the Enemy
- Immigrant Sons
- In the Name of Dark Angels
- It's Me that You Need
- It's Only Rain
- It's Your Game
- Jazz Girl
- Jealousy Regrets
- Josephine
- Just Like Noah's Ark
- Keep It a Mystery
- Keep Me
- The Kids Are Loose
- The Last Motel
- The Last Ride of Charlie Fury
- Le Dernier Mot
- Leaves
- Leaving at Midnight
- Leaving the Fair
- Light in Your Heart
- Little Casanova
- A Little Peace
- Little Quick Draw
- Llora Al Cielo
- Long-Legged Women
- Look At What We've Done
- Love
- Love and Greed
- Love Cuts Like a Dangerous Blade
- Love Touch
- Lovers Leap
- Lullaby
- Make Me As You Are
- Manslide
- Mendocino County Line
- Mexicana Fire
- (Midnight) Midlife Crisis
- Minha Vida Sem Voce
- A Minute of Your Life
- Misfits
- Monkey in My Dreams
- Monkeys in the Jungle
- Muniquita
- My Side of the River
- A New Clear Morning
- New Morning
- Nona Gita
- Non-Existente
- Nothin' Left But Ashes (After the Fire Has Gone Out)
- Old '67
- On This Rock
- Onetime, Sometime Or Never
- Only a Boy
- Out of My Hands
- Pandora's Swing
- Pay Dirt
- Pearl River
- Peter's Song
- Photograph of Mary
- The Price of Lightning
- Prime of My Life
- Promiscuous Man
- Proof of Paradise
- Quantrill
- Quelques Mots Essentiels
- The Rage
- Reach Out
- Ridin' Free
- Rosa
- Rough Justice
- Rubber Guns
- Rusted Love
- Sail Me Away
- Savannah
- Seven-Four-Seven
- Sexy on the Inside
- Shadows in Charge
- Shane
- Show Us Your Ghosts
- Sign in the Clouds
- Sign of the Cross
- Skin
- Sleeping Through the Weekend
- Slice of Life
- Slow the Dogs Down
- Slumber City
- Slummin'
- Sneakin' Out the Backway
- So Jenny Rocks
- So Much Love
- So Sad the Renegade
- Somebody Special
- Sorrow Is Not For Me
- Stallion Road
- Storm Days
- Strength of His Kiss
- Sugar and Fire
- Switchblade Years
- Talk About You
- Thank You For All of Your Loving
- Thin Ice of Love
- Things Only Get Better with Love
- Tinderbox
- To a Grandfather
- To Die With My Boots On
- Toni Loved the Rain
- Touch the Fire
- Two-Armed Bandit
- Una Fletcha Mots
- Uncool (written with and performed by Courtney Love)
- Union Jack
- Until You Come Back to Me
- Up Up (Over the Berlin Wall)
- Waitress in a Roadhouse
- Water Kill Fire
- We Are Romantics (R.U.1.2)
- We Need Us
- We've Landed
- Welcome to the Haunted Heart
- What I Really Want for Christmas
- When Love Survives
- Witches (Get Burned)
- Wouldn't Have You Any Other Way (NYC)
- Wounded Knee
- You Freed Me
- Young Lust
