= Greatest Hits (Elton John album) =

Greatest hits album by Elton John
- Released: 8 November 1974
- Recorded: 1970–1974
- Genres: Rock, pop
- Length: 44:12
- Labels: DJM; MCA; Polydor
- Producer: Gus Dudgeon

Elton John chronology
Caribou (1974)	Greatest Hits (1974)	Captain Fantastic and the Brown Dirt Cowboy (1975)

Greatest Hits is the eleventh official album release for British musician Elton John, and the first compilation. Released on 8 November 1974, it spans the years 1970 to 1974, compiling ten of John's singles, with one track variation for releases in North America and for Europe and Australia. It topped the album chart in both the United States and the United Kingdom, staying at number one for ten consecutive weeks on the Billboard 200 and eleven weeks on the UK Albums Chart. In Canada, it was number one for 13 weeks between 14 December 1974, and 22 March 1975, missing only 28 December 1974, at number two to Jim Croce's Photographs & Memories.

It was the best-selling album of 1975 in the United States, and is John's second best-selling album to date, being his first to have received an RIAA diamond certification for US sales of more than 10 million copies. As of April 2016 the album has been certified for 17 million units in the US. It remains John's best-selling album in the U.S. and one of the best-selling albums of all time, with 24 million copies sold worldwide. Although all of its songs are available as downloads, the album is currently out of print, having been superseded by four other greatest hits releases over the years: The Very Best of Elton John in 1990, Greatest Hits 1970–2002 in 2002, Rocket Man: The Definitive Hits in 2007 and Diamonds in 2017.

== Contents ==
The single "Bennie and the Jets", which had topped the charts in both the US and Canada but which had not been released as a single in the United Kingdom at that point, appeared on the American and Canadian edition of the album. It was replaced by "Candle in the Wind" for the UK and Australian edition, the latter having been a hit in both of those countries but never released as a single in the US and Canada. The 1992 reissue contains eleven tracks, with both songs included.

"Border Song," John's debut single from his second album Elton John in the UK, Australia, US and Canada, went to number 92 on the US Billboard Hot 100 and to number 34 on the Canadian RPM national singles chart as a single in 1970. All other songs made the Top 40 in the UK and the US, most also making the top ten, with "Bennie and the Jets" and "Crocodile Rock" topping the chart in the States. John would wait until 1976 to top the singles chart in the UK, via his duet with Kiki Dee, "Don't Go Breaking My Heart."

With only ten tracks total, several other hit singles from the time period are not included in this collection. "Tiny Dancer" and "Levon" from the Madman Across the Water album reached number 41 and number 24 respectively as singles in the US, and "The Bitch Is Back," his most recent single, peaked at number four in the US and topped the chart in Canada. Although all of these records charted higher than "Border Song," it may have been included because it was the first single by Elton John to chart in any market, or because of cover versions by high-profile acts such as The 5th Dimension or Aretha Franklin, the latter version reaching number 37 in the Billboard Hot 100 and number 23 in the Cash Box Top 100 in December 1970. Of the ten selections for the North American album, two ("Crocodile Rock" and "Bennie and the Jets") were number-one hits in the US; in Canada, five (these two plus "Daniel", "Goodbye Yellow Brick Road" and "Don't Let the Sun Go Down on Me") had been chart-toppers.

In 2003, Greatest Hits was ranked at number 135 on Rolling Stone magazine's list of the 500 greatest albums of all time, then was re-ranked at number 136 in a 2012 revised list.

== Critical reception ==
Professional ratings
Review scores
Source	Rating
AllMusic	5/5 stars
Christgau's Record Guide	B+
The Encyclopedia of Popular Music	4/5 stars

In Melody Maker, Chris Charlesworth said that he didn't think the compilation would be successful as "anyone interested enough is bound to have these tracks already", which made it hard for him to review the album. He noted that it must have been difficult to pick representative tracks for the record, but that John was "a personality who (thank God) put life back into rock when it was going stale". Sue Byrom of Record & Popswop Mirror said that for those that didn't have all his other albums, "this collection ... could make a good reference point", and concluded, "A lot of people think Greatest Hits albums are a cop-out ... it could be, but as far as Elton John is concerned, he really is one of the greatest hits of the music scene".

In a retrospective review for AllMusic, Stephen Thomas Erlewine stated that "rarely has a greatest-hits collection been as effective as Elton John's first compilation", and called it "a nearly flawless collection, offering a perfect introduction to Elton John and providing casual fans with almost all the hits they need".

== Track listing ==
Original North American version

All tracks are written by Elton John and Bernie Taupin.

Side one
No.	Title	Album	Length
1.	"Your Song"	Elton John (1970)	4:00
2.	"Daniel"	Don't Shoot Me I'm Only the Piano Player (1973)	3:53
3.	"Honky Cat"	Honky Château (1972)	5:12
4.	"Goodbye Yellow Brick Road"	Goodbye Yellow Brick Road (1973)	3:14
5.	"Saturday Night's Alright for Fighting"	Goodbye Yellow Brick Road	4:55

Side two
No.	Title	Album	Length
1.	"Rocket Man (I Think It's Going to Be a Long, Long Time)"	Honky Château	4:40
2.	"Bennie and the Jets"	Goodbye Yellow Brick Road	5:10
3.	"Don't Let the Sun Go Down on Me"	Caribou (1974)	5:33
4.	"Border Song"	Elton John	3:19
5.	"Crocodile Rock"	Don't Shoot Me I'm Only the Piano Player	3:56

Original international version

On the international releases, "Bennie and the Jets" was replaced by "Candle in the Wind" (3:41, taken from the album Goodbye Yellow Brick Road).

1992 Polydor Reissue

The compact disc version of Greatest Hits, issued in the 1990s, features both "Bennie and the Jets" (track 7) and "Candle in the Wind" (track 8).

1994 DCC Compact Classics Gold Disc

This edition follows the US LP track listing for the main album and adds "Candle In The Wind" as track 11.

1996 Japanese edition

The expanded edition released by Nippon PolyGram/Mercury Music Entertainment (subtitled Your Song) has a different running order, excluding "Bennie and the Jets" and adding five additional tracks. In 2000, Universal Music Japan reissued the album under the alternative title Goodbye Yellow Brick Road. The track listing is as follows:

1. "Your Song"
2. "Skyline Pigeon"
3. "Daniel"
4. "Crocodile Rock"
5. "Goodbye Yellow Brick Road"
6. "Take Me to the Pilot"
7. "Rock n' Roll Madonna"
8. "Candle in the Wind"
9. "Don't Go Breaking My Heart" (with Kiki Dee)
10. "Honky Cat"
11. "Saturday Night's Alright for Fighting"
12. "Rocket Man (I Think It's Going to Be a Long, Long Time)"
13. "Don't Let the Sun Go Down on Me"
14. "Border Song"
15. "It's Me That You Need"

== Charts ==
=== Weekly charts ===
Original release

Chart (1974–1976)	Peak position
Australian Albums (Kent Music Report)	1
Canada Top Albums/CDs (RPM)	1
Dutch Albums (Album Top 100)	16
Finnish Albums (The Official Finnish Charts)	6
German Albums (Offizielle Top 100)	43
Japanese Albums (Oricon)	67
New Zealand Albums (RMNZ)	2
Norwegian Albums (VG-lista)	3
UK Albums (Official Charts)	1
US Billboard 200	1

Reissue

Chart (1991–1996)	Peak position
Japanese Albums (Oricon)	27
US Top Catalog Albums (Billboard)	1

=== Year-end charts ===
Chart (1975)	Position
Australian Albums (Kent Music Report)	10
Canada Top Albums/CDs (RPM)	2
UK Albums (OCC)	7
US Billboard 200	1

Chart (1976)	Position
US Billboard 200	99

== Certifications and sales ==
Region	Certification	Certified units/sales
Australia (ARIA)	5× Platinum	250,000^{^}
Canada (Music Canada)	Diamond	1,000,000^{^}
France (SNEP)	Gold	100,000^{*}
Japan (RIAJ) 1996 reissue	Gold	100,000^{^}
Japan (RIAJ) 2000 reissue	Platinum	200,000^{^}
United Kingdom (BPI)	Platinum	400,000
United States (RIAA)	17× Platinum	17,000,000^{‡}
^{*} Sales figures based on certification alone.^{^} Shipments figures based on certification alone.^{‡} Sales+streaming figures based on certification alone.

== See also ==
- List of best-selling albums
- List of best-selling albums in the United States
- List of diamond-certified albums in Canada
