= Lady Samantha (album) =

- Original cassette release

Compilation album by Elton John
- Released: 1974
- Recorded: 1968–1973
- Studios: DJM Studios, London, UK; Trident, London, UK; Château d'Hérouville, Hérouville, France
- Genre: Rock
- Length: 48:09
- Label: DJM
- Producers: Gus Dudgeon, Steve Brown

Elton John chronology
Goodbye Yellow Brick Road (1973)	Lady Samantha (1974)	Caribou (1974)

LP and CD cover art

Lady Samantha is a compilation album by the British musician Elton John, released in 1974 through DJM Records. It first came out on cassette and 8-track, with LP and CD releases appearing in later years. The album consists of B-sides, non-album singles, and two tracks from the Friends soundtrack (1971).

== Track listing ==
All tracks are written by Elton John and Bernie Taupin.

Side one
No.	Title	Original release	Length
1.	"Rock and Roll Madonna"	single, 1970	4:09
2.	"Whenever You're Ready (We'll Go Steady Again)"	B-side to "Saturday Night's Alright (For Fighting)", 1973	2:47
3.	"Bad Side of the Moon"	B-side to "Border Song", 1970	3:10
4.	"Jack Rabbit"	B-side to "Saturday Night's Alright for Fighting"	1:48
5.	"Into the Old Man's Shoes"	B-side to "Your Song", 1970	4:03
6.	"It's Me That You Need"	single, 1969	3:59
7.	"Ho Ho Ho (Who'd Be a Turkey at Christmas?)"	B-side to "Step into Christmas", 1973	4:02
Total length:			23:58

Side two
No.	Title	Original release	Length
1.	"Skyline Pigeon"	B-side to "Daniel", 1973	3:51
2.	"Screw You"	B-side to "Goodbye Yellow Brick Road", 1973	4:41
3.	"Just Like Strange Rain"	B-side to "It's Me That You Need"	3:43
4.	"Grey Seal"	B-side to "Rock and Roll Madonna"	3:33
5.	"The Honey Roll"	from Friends, 1971	2:57
6.	"Lady Samantha"	single, 1969	3:02
7.	"Friends"	from Friends	2:24
Total length:			24:11

== Charts ==
Chart (1974)	Peak position
Australian Albums (Kent Music Report)	74
UK Albums (Official Charts)	56
