= Rare Masters =

Compilation album by Elton John
- Released: 20 October 1992
- Recorded: December 1967–July 1975
- Genre: Rock
- Length: 144:00
- Label: Polydor (US/Canada), DJM
- Producer: Gus Dudgeon, Caleb Quaye, Steve Brown

Elton John chronology
Greatest Hits 1976–1986 (1992)	Rare Masters (1992)	Duets (1993)

Professional ratings
Review scores
Source	Rating
AllMusic	4/5 stars
The Encyclopedia of Popular Music	2/5 stars

Rare Masters is a compilation album by Elton John that was released in 1992. It includes all A-side and B-sides released by John between 1968 and 1975 that were not included on original studio albums or on Elton John's Greatest Hits Volume II. However, some of the tracks here previously appeared on the To Be Continued... box set released in 1990.

The album also includes five outtakes, recorded in the same time period, that had previously been unreleased. It is also the only place where the soundtrack to the 1971 movie Friends has been made available on CD.

When the Elton John back catalog from 1969 to 1975 was remastered and released in 1995, many of these songs were released on those albums as well, also in remastered form.

== Track listing ==
All songs written by Elton John and Bernie Taupin, except where noted.

Disc one
No.	Title	Writer(s)	Recording date	Length
1.	"I've Been Loving You" (single, March 1968)	John	December 1967	3:16
2.	"Here's to the Next Time" (B-side to "I've Been Loving You")	John	December 1967	2:58
3.	"Lady Samantha" (single, January 1969)		December 1968	3:02
4.	"All Across the Havens" (B-side to "Lady Samantha")		December 1968	2:51
5.	"It's Me That You Need" (single, May 1969)		April 1969	4:00
6.	"Just Like Strange Rain" (B-side to "It's Me That You Need")		April 1969	3:44
7.	"Bad Side of the Moon" (B-side to "Border Song", March 1970)		January 1970	3:12
8.	"Rock and Roll Madonna" (single, June 1970)		September 1969	4:16
9.	"Grey Seal" (B-side to "Rock and Roll Madonna")		January 1970	3:35
10.	"Friends" (from Friends, March 1971)		September 1970	2:33
11.	"Michelle's Song" (from Friends)		September 1970	4:20
12.	"Seasons" (from Friends)		September 1970	3:56
13.	"Variation on Michelle's Song (A Day in the Country)" (instrumental) (from Friends)	John; Taupin; Paul Buckmaster	September 1970	2:47
14.	"Can I Put You On" (from Friends)		September 1970	5:57
15.	"Honey Roll" (from Friends)		September 1970	3:07
16.	"Variations on 'Friends'" (instrumental) (from Friends)	John; Taupin; Buckmaster	September 1970	1:43
17.	"I Meant to Do My Work Today (A Day in the Country)" (from Friends)	John; Taupin; Buckmaster	September 1970	1:36
18.	"Four Moods" (instrumental) (from Friends)	Buckmaster	September 1970	11:01
19.	"Seasons Reprise" (from Friends)		September 1970	1:39
Total length:				69:33

Disc two
No.	Title	Writer(s)	Recording date	Length
1.	"Madman Across the Water" (alternate version, outtake from Tumbleweed Connection)		May 1970	8:50
2.	"Into the Old Man's Shoes" (B-side to "Your Song", January 1971)		June 1970	4:01
3.	"Rock Me When He's Gone" (from Madman Across the Water sessions)		August 1971	5:01
4.	"Slave" (alternate version, from Honky Château sessions)		January 1972	2:48
5.	"Skyline Pigeon" (B-side to "Daniel", January 1973)		June 1972	3:51
6.	"Jack Rabbit" (B-side to "Saturday Night's Alright for Fighting", June 1973)		May 1973	1:51
7.	"Whenever You're Ready (We'll Go Steady Again)" (B-side to "Saturday Night's Alright for Fighting")		May 1973	2:51
8.	"Let Me Be Your Car" (demo)		Early 1973	4:52
9.	"Screw You (Young Man's Blues)" (B-side to "Goodbye Yellow Brick Road", September 1973)		May 1973	4:41
10.	"Step into Christmas" (single, November 1973)		November 1973	4:30
11.	"Ho! Ho! Ho! (Who'd Be a Turkey at Christmas)" (B-side of "Step Into Christmas")		November 1973	4:03
12.	"Sick City" (B-side to "Don't Let the Sun Go Down on Me", May 1974)		January 1974	5:23
13.	"Cold Highway" (B-side to "The Bitch Is Back", August 1974)		January 1974	3:26
14.	"One Day (at a Time)" (B-side to "Lucy in the Sky with Diamonds", November 1974)	John Lennon	July 1974	3:47
15.	"I Saw Her Standing There" (with John Lennon) (B-side to "Philadelphia Freedom", February 1975)	Lennon–McCartney	Recorded live at Madison Square Garden on November 28, 1974, Lennon's last concert appearance	3:51
16.	"House of Cards" (B-side to "Someone Saved My Life Tonight", May 1975)		July 1974	3:09
17.	"Planes" (outtake from Rock of the Westies)		July 1975	4:14
18.	"Sugar on the Floor" (B-side to "Island Girl", September 1975)	Kiki Dee	July 1975	4:33
