= Diamonds (Elton John album) =

Greatest hits album by Elton John
- Released: 10 November 2017
- Recorded: 1970–2016
- Genres: Rock; pop; glam rock
- Length: 155:47
- Labels: Rocket; Virgin EMI; UMG

Elton John chronology
Wonderful Crazy Night (2016)	Diamonds (2017)	Live from Moscow 1979 (2019)

Professional ratings
Review scores
Source	Rating
AllMusic	4.5/5 stars

Diamonds is a greatest hits album by British musician Elton John spanning his hits from 1970 to 2016. The album was released on 10 November 2017. It was released in a single disc version, a 2-CD version, a 3-CD deluxe box set, and a 2-LP vinyl version. The two-disc and vinyl versions have either as many or fewer songs than the previous multi-platinum collection. It was re-issued in January 2025 as a Blu-ray audio disc that quickly sold out, featuring 51 tracks. Forty-eight tracks were remixed in Dolby Atmos with optional PCM stereo 48khz 24-bit mixes, whilst tracks 49-51 were only available in PCM.

It is the first career-spanning compilation of John's music since the release of Rocket Man: The Definitive Hits in 2007. It was released to commemorate the 50 years of John's work with lyricist Bernie Taupin. Although their collaboration began in 1967, the oldest hit in the album is "Your Song", from John's eponymous 1970 album. The limited edition 3-CD box set version of Diamonds includes a 72-page hardback book with annotations for the stories behind each track and a set of five postcards of illustrations of Elton John by contemporary artist Richard Kilroy.

It was digitally reissued in 2022 to include three other tracks which were released, and had been successful, after the album's original release: "Cold Heart (Pnau remix)", "Hold Me Closer" and "Merry Christmas"; duets with Dua Lipa, Britney Spears and Ed Sheeran, respectively.

On 10 January 2025, after 374 weeks, Diamonds topped the UK Albums Chart for the first time, giving John his third number-one greatest hits album and his ninth overall.

In June 2025, the British Phonographic Industry certified Diamonds sextuple Platinum for sales of 1,800,000 units. In the United States, the Recording Industry Association of America certified Diamonds double Platinum for sales of 1,000,000 units on November 21, 2023 (for double albums over 100 minutes long, the RIAA counts each disc towards certification).

== Track listing ==
=== 2-CD and 3-CD releases ===
==== Disc one ====
All tracks are written by Elton John and Bernie Taupin, except where noted.

No.	Title	Writer(s)	Original release	Length
1.	"Your Song"		Elton John, 1970	4:03
2.	"Tiny Dancer"		Madman Across the Water, 1971	6:16
3.	"Rocket Man (I Think It's Going to Be a Long, Long Time)"		Honky Château, 1972	4:42
4.	"Honky Cat"		Honky Château	5:13
5.	"Crocodile Rock"		Don't Shoot Me I'm Only the Piano Player, 1973	3:55
6.	"Daniel"		Don't Shoot Me I'm Only the Piano Player	3:54
7.	"Saturday Night's Alright (For Fighting)"		Goodbye Yellow Brick Road, 1973	4:54
8.	"Goodbye Yellow Brick Road"		Goodbye Yellow Brick Road	3:14
9.	"Candle in the Wind"		Goodbye Yellow Brick Road	3:50
10.	"Bennie and the Jets"		Goodbye Yellow Brick Road	5:23
11.	"The Bitch Is Back"		Caribou, 1974	3:45
12.	"Philadelphia Freedom"		Non-album single, 1975	5:20
13.	"Island Girl"		Rock of the Westies, 1975	3:43
14.	"Someone Saved My Life Tonight"		Captain Fantastic and the Brown Dirt Cowboy, 1975	6:45
15.	"Don't Go Breaking My Heart" (with Kiki Dee)	Ann Orson; Carte Blanche; (Note: John and Taupin are the writers under the respective pseudonyms "Ann Orson" and "Carte Blanche")	Non-album single, 1976	4:35
16.	"Sorry Seems to Be the Hardest Word"		Blue Moves, 1976	3:52
17.	"Little Jeannie"	John; Gary Osborne	21 at 33, 1980	4:49
Total length:				78:13

==== Disc two ====
No.	Title	Writer(s)	Original release	Length
1.	"Song for Guy"	John	A Single Man, 1978	6:34
2.	"Blue Eyes"	John; Osborne	Jump Up!, 1982	3:28
3.	"I'm Still Standing"		Too Low for Zero, 1983	3:04
4.	"I Guess That's Why They Call It the Blues"	John; Taupin; Davey Johnstone	Too Low for Zero	4:43
5.	"Sad Songs (Say So Much)"		Breaking Hearts, 1984	4:48
6.	"Nikita"		Ice on Fire, 1985	5:44
7.	"I Don't Wanna Go On with You Like That"		Reg Strikes Back, 1988	4:34
8.	"Sacrifice"		Sleeping with the Past, 1989	5:05
9.	"Don't Let the Sun Go Down on Me" (with George Michael)		"Don't Let the Sun Go Down on Me" single, 1991	5:48
10.	"Something About the Way You Look Tonight"		The Big Picture, 1997	4:00
11.	"I Want Love"		Songs from the West Coast, 2001	4:37
12.	"Can You Feel the Love Tonight"	John; Tim Rice	The Lion King Soundtrack, 1994	4:01
13.	"Are You Ready for Love" (2003 Single edit)	Thom Bell; LeRoy Bell; Casey James	The Thom Bell Sessions, 1979	3:32
14.	"Electricity"	John; Lee Hall	Billy Elliot the Musical, 2005	3:32
15.	"Home Again"		The Diving Board, 2013	5:02
16.	"Looking Up"		Wonderful Crazy Night, 2016	4:06
17.	"Circle of Life"	John; Rice	The Lion King Soundtrack	4:53
Total length:				77:31

==== Deluxe edition box set extra CD ====
No.	Title	Writer(s)	Original release	Length
1.	"Skyline Pigeon" (piano version)		B-side of "Daniel" single, 1973	3:54
2.	"Lucy in the Sky with Diamonds"	Lennon–McCartney	Non-album single, 1974	6:16
3.	"Pinball Wizard"	Pete Townshend	Tommy Soundtrack, 1975	5:14
4.	"Mama Can't Buy You Love"	Bell; James	The Thom Bell Sessions	4:04
5.	"Part-Time Love"	John; Osborne	A Single Man	3:13
6.	"Victim of Love"	Pete Bellotte; Sylvester Levay; Jerry Rix	Victim of Love, 1979	3:22
7.	"Empty Garden (Hey Hey Johnny)"		Jump Up!	5:10
8.	"Kiss the Bride"		Too Low for Zero	4:23
9.	"That's What Friends Are For" (with Dionne Warwick, Stevie Wonder and Gladys Knight)	Burt Bacharach; Carole Bayer Sager	Dionne Warwick's Friends, 1985	4:15
10.	"The One"		The One, 1992	5:53
11.	"True Love" (with Kiki Dee)	Cole Porter	Duets	3:35
12.	"Believe"		Made in England, 1995	4:52
13.	"Live Like Horses" (with Luciano Pavarotti)		The Big Picture	5:07
14.	"Written in the Stars" (with LeAnn Rimes)	John; Rice	Elton John and Tim Rice's Aida, 1999	4:17
15.	"This Train Don't Stop There Anymore"		Songs from the West Coast	4:39
16.	"Good Morning to the Night" (with Pnau)	John; Nick Littlemore; Peter Mayes; Taupin	Good Morning to the Night, 2012	3:24
17.	"Step into Christmas"		Non-album single, 1973	4:29
Total length:				76:02

=== 2-LP version ===
==== Side A ====
No.	Title	Writer(s)	Album	Length
1.	"Your Song"	John; Taupin	Elton John, 1970	4:03
2.	"Tiny Dancer"	John; Taupin	Madman Across the Water, 1971	6:16
3.	"Rocket Man"	John; Taupin	Honky Château, 1972	4:42
4.	"Crocodile Rock"	John; Taupin	Don't Shoot Me I'm Only the Piano Player, 1973	3:55
5.	"Daniel"	John; Taupin	Don't Shoot Me I'm Only the Piano Player	3:54
Total length:				22:50

==== Side B ====
No.	Title	Writer(s)	Album	Length
6.	"Saturday Night's Alright for Fighting"	John; Taupin	Goodbye Yellow Brick Road, 1973	4:54
7.	"Goodbye Yellow Brick Road"	John; Taupin	Goodbye Yellow Brick Road	3:14
8.	"Candle in the Wind"	John; Taupin	Goodbye Yellow Brick Road	3:50
9.	"Bennie and the Jets"	John; Taupin	Goodbye Yellow Brick Road	5:23
10.	"Someone Saved My Life Tonight"	John; Taupin	Captain Fantastic and the Brown Dirt Cowboy, 1975	6:45
Total length:				24:06

==== Side C ====
No.	Title	Writer(s)	Album	Length
11.	"Don't Go Breaking My Heart" (with Kiki Dee)	Ann Orson; Carte Blanche	Non-album single, 1976	4:35
12.	"Sorry Seems to Be the Hardest Word"	John; Taupin	Blue Moves, 1976	3:52
13.	"Song for Guy"	John	A Single Man, 1978	6:34
14.	"Blue Eyes"	John; Osborne	Jump Up!, 1982	3:28
15.	"I'm Still Standing"	John; Taupin	Too Low for Zero, 1983	3:04
16.	"I Guess That's Why They Call It the Blues"	John; Taupin; Johnstone	Too Low for Zero	4:43
Total length:				26:16

==== Side D ====
No.	Title	Writer(s)	Album	Length
17.	"Nikita"	John; Taupin	Ice on Fire, 1985	5:44
18.	"Sacrifice"	John; Taupin	Sleeping with the Past, 1989	5:05
19.	"Don't Let the Sun Go Down on Me" (with George Michael)	John; Taupin	Duets, 1993	5:48
20.	"Can You Feel the Love Tonight"	John; Rice	The Lion King Soundtrack, 1994	4:01
21.	"Are You Ready for Love" (2003 Single edit)	Bell; Bell; James	The Thom Bell Sessions, 1979	3:32
Total length:				24:10

=== 1-CD version ===
No.	Title	Writer(s)	Album	Length
1.	"Your Song"	John; Taupin	Elton John, 1970	4:03
2.	"Tiny Dancer"	John; Taupin	Madman Across the Water, 1971	6:15
3.	"Rocket Man (I Think It's Gonna Be a Long, Long Time)"	John; Taupin	Honky Château, 1972	4:40
4.	"Crocodile Rock"	John; Taupin	Don't Shoot Me I'm Only the Piano Player, 1973	3:54
5.	"Daniel"	John; Taupin	Don't Shoot Me I'm Only the Piano Player, 1973	3:53
6.	"Saturday Night's Alright (For Fighting)"	John; Taupin	Goodbye Yellow Brick Road, 1973	4:54
7.	"Goodbye Yellow Brick Road"	John; Taupin	Goodbye Yellow Brick Road, 1973	3:13
8.	"Candle in the Wind"	John; Taupin	Goodbye Yellow Brick Road, 1973	3:47
9.	"Bennie and the Jets"	John; Taupin	Goodbye Yellow Brick Road, 1973	5:21
10.	"Philadelphia Freedom"	John; Taupin	Non album single, 1975	5:28
11.	"Island Girl"	John; Taupin	Rock of the Westies, 1975	3:42
12.	"Don't Go Breaking My Heart" (with Kiki Dee)	Ann Orson; Carte Blanche	Non-album single, 1976	4:25
13.	"Mama Can't Buy You Love"	Bell; James	The Thom Bell Sessions, 1979	4:03
14.	"I'm Still Standing"	John; Taupin	Too Low for Zero, 1983	3:02
15.	"I Guess That's Why They Call It The Blues"	John; Taupin	Too Low for Zero, 1983	4:41
16.	"Don't Let the Sun Go Down on Me" (with George Michael)	John; Taupin	Duets, 1993	5:47
17.	"Can You Feel the Love Tonight"	John; Rice	The Lion King Soundtrack, 1994	4:00

=== 2022 digital reissue ===
==== Disc one ====
No.	Title	Writer(s)	Album	Length
1.	"Cold Heart (Pnau remix)" (with Dua Lipa, radio edit)	John; Taupin; Mayes; Littlemore; Sam Littlemore	The Lockdown Sessions, 2021	3:22
2.	"Hold Me Closer" (with Britney Spears)	John; Taupin; Andrew Wotman; Henry Walter	The Lockdown Sessions	3:22
3.	"Your Song"	John; Taupin	Elton John, 1970	4:03
4.	"Tiny Dancer"	John; Taupin	Madman Across the Water, 1971	6:16
5.	"Rocket Man (I Think It's Going to Be a Long, Long Time)"	John; Taupin	Honky Château, 1972	4:42
6.	"Honky Cat"	John; Taupin	Honky Château	5:13
7.	"Crocodile Rock"	John; Taupin	Don't Shoot Me I'm Only the Piano Player, 1973	3:55
8.	"Daniel"	John; Taupin	Don't Shoot Me I'm Only the Piano Player	3:54
9.	"Saturday Night's Alright (For Fighting)"	John; Taupin	Goodbye Yellow Brick Road, 1973	4:54
10.	"Goodbye Yellow Brick Road"	John; Taupin	Goodbye Yellow Brick Road	3:14
11.	"Candle in the Wind"	John; Taupin	Goodbye Yellow Brick Road	3:50
12.	"Bennie and the Jets"	John; Taupin	Goodbye Yellow Brick Road	5:23
13.	"The Bitch Is Back"	John; Taupin	Caribou, 1974	3:45
14.	"Philadelphia Freedom"	John; Taupin	Non-album single, 1975	5:20
15.	"Island Girl"	John; Taupin	Rock of the Westies, 1975	3:43
16.	"Someone Saved My Life Tonight"	John; Taupin	Captain Fantastic and the Brown Dirt Cowboy, 1975	6:45
17.	"Don't Go Breaking My Heart" (with Kiki Dee)	Ann Orson; Carte Blanche	Non-album single, 1976	4:35
18.	"Sorry Seems to Be the Hardest Word"	John; Taupin	Blue Moves, 1976	3:52
19.	"Little Jeannie"	John; Osborne	21 at 33, 1980	4:49
Total length:				84:57

==== Disc two ====
No.	Title	Writer(s)	Album	Length
1.	"Song for Guy"	John	A Single Man, 1978	6:34
2.	"Blue Eyes"	John; Osborne	Jump Up!, 1982	3:28
3.	"I'm Still Standing"	John; Taupin	Too Low for Zero, 1983	3:04
4.	"I Guess That's Why They Call It the Blues"	John; Taupin; Johnstone	Too Low for Zero	4:43
5.	"Sad Songs (Say So Much)"	John; Taupin	Breaking Hearts, 1984	4:48
6.	"Nikita"	John; Taupin	Ice on Fire, 1985	5:44
7.	"I Don't Wanna Go On with You Like That"	John; Taupin	Reg Strikes Back, 1988	4:34
8.	"Sacrifice"	John; Taupin	Sleeping with the Past, 1989	5:05
9.	"Don't Let the Sun Go Down on Me" (with George Michael)	John; Taupin	Duets, 1993	5:48
10.	"Something About the Way You Look Tonight"	John; Taupin	The Big Picture, 1997	4:00
11.	"I Want Love"	John; Taupin	Songs from the West Coast, 2001	4:37
12.	"Can You Feel the Love Tonight"	John; Rice	The Lion King Soundtrack, 1994	4:01
13.	"Are You Ready for Love" (2003 Single edit)	Bell; Bell; James	The Thom Bell Sessions, 1979	3:32
14.	"Electricity"	John; Hall	Billy Elliot the Musical, 2005	3:32
15.	"Home Again"	John; Taupin	The Diving Board, 2013	5:02
16.	"Looking Up"	John; Taupin	Wonderful Crazy Night, 2016	4:06
17.	"Circle of Life"	John; Rice	The Lion King Soundtrack	4:53
Total length:				77:31

==== Disc three ====
No.	Title	Writer(s)	Album	Length
1.	"Skyline Pigeon" (piano version)	John; Taupin	B-side of "Daniel" single, 1973	3:54
2.	"Lucy in the Sky with Diamonds"	Lennon; McCartney	Non-album single, 1974	6:16
3.	"Pinball Wizard"	Pete Townshend	Tommy Soundtrack, 1975	5:14
4.	"Mama Can't Buy You Love"	Bell; James	The Thom Bell Sessions, 1979	4:04
5.	"Part-Time Love"	John; Osborne	A Single Man, 1978	3:13
6.	"Victim of Love"	Bellotte; Levay; Rix	Victim of Love, 1979	3:22
7.	"Empty Garden (Hey Hey Johnny)"	John; Taupin	Jump Up!, 1982	5:10
8.	"Kiss the Bride"	John; Taupin	Too Low for Zero, 1983	4:23
9.	"That's What Friends Are For" (with Dionne Warwick, Stevie Wonder and Gladys Knight)	Bacharach; Bayer Sager	Dionne Warwick's Friends, 1985	4:15
10.	"The One"	John; Taupin	The One, 1992	5:53
11.	"True Love" (with Kiki Dee)	Porter	Duets, 1993	3:35
12.	"Believe"	John; Taupin	Made in England, 1995	4:52
13.	"Live Like Horses" (with Luciano Pavarotti)	John; Taupin	The Big Picture, 1997	5:07
14.	"Written in the Stars" (with LeAnn Rimes)	John; Rice	Elton John and Tim Rice's Aida, 1999	4:17
15.	"This Train Don't Stop There Anymore"	John; Taupin	Songs from the West Coast, 2001	4:39
16.	"Good Morning to the Night" (with Pnau)	John; Littlemore; Mayes; Taupin	Good Morning to the Night, 2012	3:24
17.	"Step into Christmas"	John; Taupin	Non-album single, 1973	4:29
18.	"Merry Christmas" (with Ed Sheeran)	John; Sheeran; Steve Mac	The Lockdown Sessions	3:28
Total length:				79:30

== Charts ==
=== Weekly charts ===
Weekly chart performance for Diamonds
Chart (2017–2025)	Peak position
Australian Albums (ARIA)	3
Austrian Albums (Ö3 Austria)	26
Belgian Albums (Ultratop Flanders)	14
Belgian Albums (Ultratop Wallonia)	19
Canadian Albums (Billboard)	5
Dutch Albums (Album Top 100)	88
French Albums (SNEP)	9
German Albums (Offizielle Top 100)	31
Irish Albums (IRMA)	3
Italian Albums (FIMI)	63
New Zealand Albums (RMNZ)	2
Polish Albums (ZPAV)	2
Portuguese Albums (AFP)	50
Scottish Albums (Official Charts)	2
Spanish Albums (PROMUSICAE)	24
Swiss Albums (Schweizer Hitparade)	16
UK Albums (Official Charts)	1
US Billboard 200	7
US Top Rock Albums (Billboard)	1

=== Year-end charts ===
Year-end chart performance for Diamonds
Chart (2017)	Position
UK Albums (OCC)	29
Chart (2018)	Position
Australian Albums (ARIA)	84
Irish Albums (IRMA)	35
New Zealand Albums (RMNZ)	37
UK Albums (OCC)	36
US Billboard 200	62
US Top Rock Albums (Billboard)	3
Chart (2019)	Position
Australian Albums (ARIA)	14
Belgian Albums (Ultratop Flanders)	154
Belgian Albums (Ultratop Wallonia)	188
Canadian Albums (Billboard)	24
Irish Albums (IRMA)	20
New Zealand Albums (RMNZ)	9
UK Albums (OCC)	15
US Billboard 200	34
US Top Rock Albums (Billboard)	3
Chart (2020)	Position
Australian Albums (ARIA)	8
Canadian Albums (Billboard)	23
Irish Albums (IRMA)	18
New Zealand Albums (RMNZ)	12
UK Albums (OCC)	9
US Billboard 200	44
US Top Rock Albums (Billboard)	2
Chart (2021)	Position
Australian Albums (ARIA)	16
Belgian Albums (Ultratop Flanders)	183
Canadian Albums (Billboard)	19
Irish Albums (IRMA)	11
UK Albums (OCC)	8
US Billboard 200	43
US Top Rock Albums (Billboard)	4
Chart (2022)	Position
Australian Albums (ARIA)	14
Canadian Albums (Billboard)	17
UK Albums (OCC)	7
US Billboard 200	40
Chart (2023)	Position
Australian Albums (ARIA)	13
Canadian Albums (Billboard)	8
UK Albums (OCC)	4
US Billboard 200	18
Chart (2024)	Position
Australian Albums (ARIA)	26
Canadian Albums (Billboard)	18
UK Albums (OCC)	12
US Billboard 200	35
Chart (2025)	Position
Australian Albums (ARIA)	57
Canadian Albums (Billboard)	23
UK Albums (OCC)	12
US Billboard 200	35
US Top Rock & Alternative Albums (Billboard)	5

== Certifications ==
Certifications for Diamonds
Region	Certification	Certified units/sales
Australia (ARIA)	3× Platinum	210,000^{‡}
Austria (IFPI Austria)	Gold	7,500^{‡}
Canada (Music Canada)	Platinum	80,000^{‡}
Denmark (IFPI Danmark)	Gold	10,000^{‡}
France (SNEP)	3× Platinum	300,000^{‡}
Italy (FIMI)	Gold	25,000^{‡}
New Zealand (RMNZ)	4× Platinum	60,000^{‡}
United Kingdom (BPI)	6× Platinum	1,800,000^{‡}
United States (RIAA)	2× Platinum	1,000,000^{‡}
^{‡} Sales+streaming figures based on certification alone.
