= Rocket Man: The Definitive Hits =

Greatest hits album by Elton John
- Released: 26 March 2007
- Recorded: 1970–2006
- Genres: Rock; pop
- Length: 79:37 (UK); 78:44 (US); 78:02 (Japan)
- Label: Mercury
- Producers: Gus Dudgeon; Chris Thomas

Elton John chronology
The Captain & the Kid (2006)	Rocket Man: The Definitive Hits (2007)	The Union (2010)

Professional ratings
Review scores
Source	Rating
AllMusic	4.5/5 stars

Rocket Man: The Definitive Hits (retitled Rocket Man: Number Ones for its US and Canada release, ザ・ベスト • 僕の歌は君の歌 for its Japanese release, Rocket Man: 18 Norske Hits for its Norwegian release, and Just Like Belgium: The Definitive Hits for its Belgian release) is a compilation album by British musician Elton John featuring 13 number one songs and a number of bonus tracks and live renditions. Worldwide there have been released 17 different versions of the album, including a CD/DVD combo. All versions include, "Your Song", the title track, "Rocket Man (I Think It's Going to Be a Long, Long Time)", "Daniel", "Candle In The Wind", and "Don't Let The Sun Go Down On Me".

The album was released on 26 March 2007 to commemorate Elton John's 60th birthday on 25 March. The album was certified platinum in the UK for shipping 300,000 units in February 2010. In the US the album debuted on the Billboard 200 at number 9 and was certified gold by the RIAA for sales of 500,000 copies in October 2008 and platinum for 1,000,000 copies in November 2014. This was then followed by a double platinum and triple platinum certification in April 2016 and August 2017, respectively.

== Track listing ==
=== Canon international edition ===
The international version includes, among others, the UK, Hungary, Italy, Poland, and Portugal.

No.	Title	Length
1.	"Bennie and the Jets"	5:22
2.	"Philadelphia Freedom"	4:59
3.	"Daniel"	3:53
4.	"Rocket Man (I Think It's Going to Be a Long, Long Time)"	4:41
5.	"I Guess That's Why They Call It the Blues"	4:41
6.	"Tiny Dancer"	6:15
7.	"Don't Let the Sun Go Down on Me"	5:36
8.	"I Want Love"	4:35
9.	"Candle in the Wind"	3:48
10.	"Crocodile Rock"	3:54
11.	"I'm Still Standing"	3:01
12.	"Saturday Night's Alright (For Fighting)"	4:57
13.	"Your Song"	4:00
14.	"Sorry Seems to Be the Hardest Word"	3:47
15.	"Sacrifice"	5:04
16.	"Goodbye Yellow Brick Road"	3:13
17.	"Tinderbox"	4:24
18.	"Are You Ready for Love" ('79 edit)	3:31

The UK Special Edition (which included a DVD) omitted "Crocodile Rock" and "Sacrifice" and instead included "The Bitch Is Back" and "Can You Feel the Love Tonight".

=== US/Canada edition ===
Rocket Man: Number Ones & Other Favorites
No.	Title	Length
1.	"Goodbye Yellow Brick Road"	3:16
2.	"Bennie and the Jets"	5:24
3.	"Daniel"	3:55
4.	"Crocodile Rock"	3:57
5.	"Lucy in the Sky with Diamonds"	5:57
6.	"Philadelphia Freedom"	5:21
7.	"Island Girl"	3:43
8.	"Don't Go Breaking My Heart" (with Kiki Dee)	4:35
9.	"Sorry Seems to Be the Hardest Word"	3:50
10.	"Sacrifice"	5:06
11.	"Don't Let the Sun Go Down on Me" (with George Michael)	5:49
12.	"Can You Feel the Love Tonight"	4:01
13.	"Your Song"	4:04
14.	"Tiny Dancer"	6:17
15.	"Rocket Man (I Think It's Going to Be a Long, Long Time)"	4:43
16.	"Candle in the Wind"	3:51
17.	"Saturday Night's Alright (For Fighting)"	4:55

=== Country specific editions ===
==== Australian/New Zealand version ====
1. "Bennie and the Jets"
2. "Philadelphia Freedom"
3. "Daniel"
4. "Rocket Man (I Think It's Going to Be a Long, Long Time)"
5. "I Guess That's Why They Call It the Blues"
6. "Tiny Dancer"
7. "Don't Let the Sun Go Down on Me"
8. "Don't Go Breaking My Heart" (with Kiki Dee) (Live at Madison Square Garden, New York City, New York, US in October 2000)
9. "Candle in the Wind"
10. "Crocodile Rock"
11. "I'm Still Standing"
12. "Saturday Night's Alright (For Fighting)"
13. "Your Song"
14. "Sorry Seems to Be the Hardest Word"
15. "Sacrifice"
16. "Goodbye Yellow Brick Road"
17. "Tinderbox"
18. "Blue Eyes"

==== 2CD Australian Tour Edition 2011 ====
Disc 1

1. "Tiny Dancer"
2. "Your Song"
3. "Bennie and the Jets"
4. "Don't Go Breaking My Heart" (with Kiki Dee)
5. "Candle in the Wind"
6. "Rocket Man (I Think It's Going To Be A Long, Long Time)"
7. "Daniel"
8. "Crocodile Rock"
9. "I Guess That's Why They Call It The Blues"
10. "I'm Still Standing"
11. "Something About the Way You Look Tonight"
12. "Circle of Life"
13. "Can You Feel the Love Tonight"
14. "Sacrifice"
15. "Goodbye Yellow Brick Road"
16. "Don't Let the Sun Go Down on Me"
17. "Nikita"

Disc 2

1. "Sorry Seems To Be The Hardest Word"
2. "Empty Garden (Hey Hey Johnny)"
3. "Philadelphia Freedom"
4. "Lucy in the Sky with Diamonds"
5. "Someone Saved My Life Tonight"
6. "Saturday Night's Alright (For Fighting)"
7. "Levon"
8. "The One"
9. "Healing Hands"
10. "Club at the End of the Street"
11. "Mona Lisas and Mad Hatters"
12. "Blue Eyes"
13. "Teacher I Need You"
14. "Country Comfort"
15. "Sad Songs (Say So Much)"
16. "The Last Song"

==== Austrian version ====
1. "Your Song" - 4:02
2. "Rocket Man (I Think It's Going to Be a Long, Long Time)" - 4:42
3. "Crocodile Rock" - 3:55
4. "Daniel" - 3:55
5. "Goodbye Yellow Brick Road" - 3:14
6. "Candle in the Wind" - 3:50
7. "Don't Let the Sun Go Down on Me" - 5:37
8. "Don't Go Breaking My Heart" (with Kiki Dee) - 4:33
9. "Sorry Seems to Be the Hardest Word" - 3:49
10. "Circle of Life" - 4:50
11. "Blue Eyes" - 3:25
12. "I'm Still Standing" - 3:01
13. "I Guess That's Why They Call It the Blues" - 4:41
14. "Sad Songs (Say So Much)" - 4:09
15. "Nikita" - 5:43
16. "I Don't Wanna Go On with You Like That" - 3:59
17. "Can You Feel the Love Tonight" - 3:59
18. "Tinderbox" - 4:22

==== Belgian version ====
1. "Just Like Belgium" - 4:10
2. "Candle in the Wind" - 3:50
3. "Blue Eyes" - 3:26
4. "I Guess That's Why They Call It the Blues" - 4:42
5. "I'm Still Standing" - 3:01
6. "Crocodile Rock" - 3:55
7. "Don't Go Breaking My Heart" (with Kiki Dee) - 4:34
8. "Your Song" - 4:02
9. "Nikita" - 5:44
10. "Sacrifice" - 5:04
11. "Daniel" - 3:54
12. "Sorry Seems to Be the Hardest Word" - 3:49
13. "Don't Let the Sun Go Down on Me" - 5:37
14. "Rocket Man (I Think It's Going to Be a Long, Long Time)" - 4:42
15. "Song for Guy" - 5:04
16. "Circle of Life" - 4:51
17. "Can You Feel the Love Tonight" - 4:00
18. "Tinderbox" - 4:23

==== Brazilian version ====
1. "Bennie and the Jets" - 5:21
2. "Philadelphia Freedom" - 5:00
3. "Daniel" - 3:53
4. "Rocket Man (I Think It's Going to Be a Long, Long Time)" - 4:41
5. "I Guess That's Why They Call It the Blues" - 4:41
6. "Tiny Dancer" - 6:15
7. "Don't Let the Sun Go Down on Me" - 5:39
8. "I Want Love" - 4:35
9. "Candle in the Wind" - 3:48
10. "Crocodile Rock" - 3:55
11. "Your Song" - 4:01
12. "Sorry Seems to Be the Hardest Word" - 3:47
13. "Sacrifice" - 5:03
14. "Goodbye Yellow Brick Road" - 3:13
15. "Tinderbox" - 4:23
16. "Skyline Pigeon" (Piano Version) - 3:56
17. "Don't Go Breaking My Heart" (with Kiki Dee) - 4:34
18. "Sad Songs (Say So Much)" - 4:07

==== Chinese version ====
1. "Bennie and the Jets" – 5:22
2. "Philadelphia Freedom" – 4:59
3. "Daniel" – 3:53
4. "Rocket Man (I Think It's Going to Be a Long, Long Time)" – 4:41
5. "I Guess That's Why They Call it the Blues" – 4:41
6. "Don't Let the Sun Go Down on Me" – 5:36
7. "I Want Love" – 4:35
8. "Candle in the Wind" – 3:48
9. "Crocodile Rock" – 3:54
10. "I'm Still Standing" – 3:01
11. "Your Song" – 4:00
12. "Sorry Seems to Be the Hardest Word" – 3:47
13. "Sacrifice" – 5:04
14. "Goodbye Yellow Brick Road" – 3:13
15. "Can You Feel the Love Tonight" – 4:01
16. "Are You Ready for Love" – 3:31

==== Danish version ====
1. "I'm Still Standing" – 3:01
2. "Goodbye Yellow Brick Road" – 3:14
3. "Sad Songs (Say So Much)" – 4:08
4. "Rocket Man (I Think It's Going to Be a Long, Long Time)" – 4:42
5. "Don't Go Breaking My Heart" (with Kiki Dee) (Live at Madison Square Garden, New York City, New York, US, October 2000) – 4:33
6. "Can You Feel the Love Tonight" – 3:59
7. "Candle in the Wind" - 3:50
8. "Nikita" - 5:43
9. "Sorry Seems to Be the Hardest Word" – 3:49
10. "Don't Let the Sun Go Down on Me" – 5:37
11. "Blue Eyes" – 3:26
12. "Your Song" – 4:02
13. "Sacrifice" – 5:03
14. "Daniel" - 3:54
15. "Something About the Way You Look Tonight" – 3:59
16. "Crocodile Rock" – 3:54
17. "Tinderbox" – 4:22
18. "I Guess That's Why They Call It the Blues" – 4:41

==== Dutch version ====
1. "Your Song" - 4:03
2. "Border Song" - 3:21
3. "Rocket Man (I Think It's Going to Be a Long, Long Time)" - 4:42
4. "Daniel" - 3:53
5. "Goodbye Yellow Brick Road" - 3:14
6. "Candle in the Wind" - 3:49
7. "Don't Let the Sun Go Down on Me" - 5:37
8. "Sorry Seems to Be the Hardest Word" - 3:48
9. "Song for Guy" - 5:04
10. "I Guess That's Why They Call It the Blues" - 4:42
11. "Blue Eyes" - 3:25
12. "Sad Songs (Say So Much)" - 4:09
13. "Nikita" - 5:44
14. "Cry to Heaven" - 4:16
15. "Sacrifice" - 5:03
16. "Circle of Life" - 4:50
17. "Can You Feel the Love Tonight" - 4:00
18. "Tinderbox" - 4:27

==== Finnish version ====
1. "Bennie and the Jets" – 5:22
2. "Philadelphia Freedom" – 4:59
3. "Daniel" – 3:53
4. "Rocket Man (I Think It's Going to Be a Long, Long Time)" – 4:41
5. "I Guess That's Why They Call it the Blues" – 4:41
6. "Tiny Dancer" – 6:15
7. "Don't Let the Sun Go Down on Me" (with George Michael) – 5:49
8. "I Want Love" – 4:35
9. "Candle in the Wind" – 3:48
10. "The Bitch Is Back" – 3:42
11. "I'm Still Standing" – 3:01
12. "Saturday Night's Alright for Fighting" – 4:11
13. "Your Song" – 4:00
14. "Sorry Seems to Be the Hardest Word" (with Blue) (Radio edit) – 3:30
15. "Can You Feel the Love Tonight" – 3:59
16. "Goodbye Yellow Brick Road" – 3:13
17. "Tinderbox" – 4:24

==== French version ====
1. "Don't Go Breaking My Heart" (with Kiki Dee) – 4:35
2. "Nikita" – 5:43
3. "Sorry Seems to Be the Hardest Word" – 3:49
4. "Sacrifice" – 5:04
5. "Can You Feel the Love Tonight" – 3:59
6. "Crocodile Rock" – 3:54
7. "Your Song" – 4:02
8. "Don't Let the Sun Go Down on Me" – 5:37
9. "Candle in the Wind" – 3:50
10. "Bennie and the Jets" – 5:24
11. "I'm Still Standing" – 3:01
12. "Someone Saved My Life Tonight" - 6:45 (not included on the official release)
13. "Rocket Man (I Think It's Going to Be a Long, Long Time)" – 4:42
14. "Daniel" – 3:54
15. "Tiny Dancer" – 6:17
16. "Goodbye Yellow Brick Road" – 3:14
17. "Tinderbox" – 4:22

==== German/Swiss version ====
1. "Crocodile Rock"
2. "Daniel"
3. "Rocket Man (I Think It's Going to Be a Long, Long Time)"
4. "I Guess That's Why They Call It the Blues"
5. "Blue Eyes"
6. "Don't Let the Sun Go Down on Me"
7. "Sacrifice/Pinball Wizard" (Live in Verona, Italy, 1989)
8. "Candle in the Wind"
9. "Sad Songs (Say So Much)"
10. "I'm Still Standing"
11. "Saturday Night's Alright for Fighting"
12. "Your Song"
13. "Sorry Seems to Be the Hardest Word"
14. "Can You Feel the Love Tonight"
15. "Nikita"
16. "Don't Go Breaking My Heart" (with Kiki Dee)
17. "Goodbye Yellow Brick Road"
18. "Tinderbox"

==== Japanese version ====
1. "Your Song" - 4:02
2. "Candle in the Wind" - 3:50
3. "Goodbye Yellow Brick Road" - 3:15
4. "It's Me That You Need" - 4:03
5. "Friends" - 2:24
6. "Daniel" - 3:54
7. "Saturday Night's Alright (For Fighting)" - 4:54
8. "Crocodile Rock" - 3:57
9. "Rocket Man (I Think It's Going to Be a Long, Long Time)" - 4:43
10. "I Guess That's Why They Call It the Blues" - 4:43
11. "Tiny Dancer" - 6:16
12. "Don't Let the Sun Go Down on Me" - 5:37
13. "Lucy in the Sky with Diamonds" - 6:18
14. "Island Girl" - 3:44
15. "Can You Feel the Love Tonight" - 4:01
16. "Empty Garden (Hey Hey Johnny)" - 5:09
17. "I'm Still Standing" - 3:02
18. "Sad Songs (Say So Much)" - 4:08

==== Malaysian version ====
1. "Bennie and the Jets"
2. "Philadelphia Freedom"
3. "Daniel"
4. "Rocket Man (I Think It's Going to Be a Long, Long Time)"
5. "I Guess That's Why They Call It the Blues"
6. "Tiny Dancer"
7. "Don't Let the Sun Go Down on Me"
8. "I Want Love"
9. "Candle in the Wind"
10. "The Bitch Is Back"
11. "I'm Still Standing"
12. "Saturday Night's Alright (For Fighting)"
13. "Your Song"
14. "Sorry Seems to Be the Hardest Word"
15. "Can You Feel the Love Tonight"
16. "Goodbye Yellow Brick Road"
17. "Tinderbox"
18. "Are You Ready For Love"

==== Norwegian version ====
1. "Your Song" – 4:02
2. "Goodbye Yellow Brick Road" – 3:14
3. "Sorry Seems to Be the Hardest Word" – 3:49
4. "Can You Feel the Love Tonight" – 3:59
5. "Candle in the Wind" – 3:50
6. "Don't Let the Sun Go Down on Me" – 5:37
7. "Daniel" – 3:54
8. "Something About the Way You Look Tonight" – 3:59
9. "I'm Still Standing" – 3:01
10. "Sacrifice/Pinball Wizard" (Live in Verona, Italy, 1989) – 3:38
11. "Nikita" – 5:43
12. "Rocket Man (I Think It's Going to Be a Long, Long Time)" – 4:42
13. "Don't Go Breaking My Heart" (with Kiki Dee) – 4:33
14. "I Guess That's Why They Call It the Blues" – 4:41
15. "Circle of Life" – 4:50
16. "Crocodile Rock" – 3:54
17. "Blue Eyes" – 3:26
18. "Tinderbox" – 4:22

==== South African version ====
1. "Saturday Night's Alright (For Fighting)" - 4:58
2. "Bennie and the Jets" - 5:22
3. "Sacrifice - 5:03
4. "Candle in the Wind" - 3:50
5. "Nikita" - 5:43
6. "I Want Love" - 4:35
7. "Can You Feel the Love Tonight" - 4:02
8. "Daniel" - 3:52
9. "Little Jeannie" - 5:14
10. "I Guess That's Why They Call It the Blues" - 4:43
11. "Rocket Man (I Think It's Going to Be a Long, Long Time)" - 4:44
12. "Don't Let the Sun Go Down on Me" - 5:36
13. "Goodbye Yellow Brick Road" - 3:15
14. "I'm Still Standing" - 3:02
15. "Sorry Seems to Be the Hardest Word" - 3:48
16. "Blue Eyes" - 3:27
17. "Your Song" - 4:01
18. "Tinderbox" - 4:24

==== Spanish version ====
1. "Bennie and the Jets"
2. "Philadelphia Freedom"
3. "Daniel"
4. "Rocket Man (I Think It's Going to Be a Long, Long Time)"
5. "I Guess That's Why They Call It the Blues"
6. "Tiny Dancer"
7. "Don't Let the Sun Go Down on Me"
8. "I Want Love"
9. "Candle in the Wind"
10. "Crocodile Rock"
11. "I'm Still Standing"
12. "Saturday Night's Alright for Fighting"
13. "Your Song"
14. "Sorry Seems to Be the Hardest Word"
15. "Sacrifice/Pinball Wizard" (Live in Verona, Italy, 1989)
16. "Goodbye Yellow Brick Road"
17. "Tinderbox"

=== iTunes Deluxe album ===
Disc one

1. "Bennie and the Jets" - 5:24
2. "Philadelphia Freedom" - 5:21
3. "Daniel" - 3:55
4. "Rocket Man (I Think It's Going to Be a Long, Long Time)" - 4:43
5. "I Guess That's Why They Call It the Blues" - 4:43
6. "Tiny Dancer" - 6:17
7. "Don't Let the Sun Go Down on Me" - 5:37
8. "I Want Love" - 4:35
9. "Candle in the Wind" - 3:51
10. "Crocodile Rock" - 3:57
11. "I'm Still Standing" - 3:01
12. "Saturday Night's Alright (For Fighting)" - 4:53
13. "Your Song" - 4:00
14. "Sorry Seems to Be the Hardest Word" - 3:48

Disc two

1. "Sacrifice" - 5:03
2. "Goodbye Yellow Brick Road" - 3:14
3. "Tinderbox" - 4:27
4. "Are You Ready for Love" ('79 radio edit) - 3:30
5. "Don't Go Breaking My Heart" (with Kiki Dee) - 4:35
6. "Nikita" - 5:44
7. "Border Song" - 3:21
8. "Blue Eyes" - 3:25
9. "Sad Songs (Say So Much)" - 4:09
10. "Cry to Heaven" - 4:16
11. "Circle of Life" - 4:50
12. "Just Like Belgium" - 4:10
13. "Skyline Pigeon" (Piano version) - 3:52
14. "Something About the Way You Look Tonight" - 3:59

=== DVD ===
Red Piano Show (Live)

1. "Bennie and the Jets"
2. "Rocket Man (I Think It's Going to Be a Long, Long Time)"
3. "Candle in the Wind"
4. "Saturday Night's Alright (For Fighting)" (not included on the Chinese edition due to censorship restrictions)
5. "Your Song"

Bonus videos

1. "Your Song"
2. "I Guess That's Why They Call It the Blues"
3. "I'm Still Standing"
4. "I Want Love"
5. "Tinderbox"

== Charts ==
=== Weekly charts ===
Chart (2007–2011)	Peak position
Australian Albums (ARIA)	10
Austrian Albums (Ö3 Austria)	32
Belgian Albums (Ultratop Flanders) Just Like Belgium - The Definitive Hits	3
Belgian Albums (Ultratop Wallonia) Just Like Belgium - The Definitive Hits	34
Canadian Albums (Billboard) Rocket Man: Number Ones	8
Danish Albums (Hitlisten)	1
Dutch Albums (Album Top 100)	62
German Albums (Offizielle Top 100)	47
Irish Albums (IRMA)	5
Italian Albums (FIMI)	60
Japanese Albums Chart	165
New Zealand Albums (RMNZ)	5
Norwegian Albums (VG-lista)	3
Scottish Albums (Official Charts)	2
Spanish Albums (Promusicae)	82
Swedish Albums (Sverigetopplistan)	6
Swiss Albums (Schweizer Hitparade)	13
UK Albums (Official Charts)	2
US Billboard 200 Rocket Man: Number Ones	9
US Top Catalog Albums (Billboard) Rocket Man: Number Ones	1
US Top Rock Albums (Billboard) Rocket Man: Number Ones	3

=== Year-end charts ===
Chart (2007)	Peak position
Australian Albums (ARIA)	80
Belgian Albums (Ultratop Flanders) Just Like Belgium - The Definitive Hits	43
UK Albums (OCC)	89
US Billboard 200 Rocket Man: Number Ones	177

Chart (2012)	Peak position
Australian Albums (ARIA)	88

Chart (2017)	Peak position
US Top Rock Albums (Billboard) Rocket Man: Number Ones	64

=== Decade-end charts ===
Chart (2010–2019)	Peak position
Australian Albums (ARIA)	94

== Certifications ==
Region	Certification	Certified units/sales
Australia (ARIA)	3× Platinum	210,000^{^}
Belgium (BRMA)	Gold	25,000^{*}
Brazil (Pro-Música Brasil)	Gold	30,000^{*}
Denmark (IFPI Danmark)	Gold	15,000^{^}
Ireland (IRMA)	Platinum	15,000^{^}
Italy (FIMI) sales since 2009	Gold	25,000^{*}
New Zealand (RMNZ)	Platinum	15,000^{^}
Norway (IFPI Norway)	Platinum	40,000^{*}
Russia (NFPF)	Platinum	20,000^{*}
Sweden (GLF)	Gold	20,000^{^}
United Kingdom (BPI)	Platinum	300,000^{^}
United States (RIAA)	3× Platinum	3,000,000^{‡}
^{*} Sales figures based on certification alone.^{^} Shipments figures based on certification alone.^{‡} Sales+streaming figures based on certification alone.
