= From Denver to L.A. =

Single by Elton John

from the album The Games soundtrack
- B-side: Warm Summer Rain; (by the Barbara Moore Singers)
- Released: 3 July 1970
- Recorded: Olympic Studios, June 1969
- Genre: Pop
- Length: 2:22
- Label: Viking VIK 1010
- Songwriters: Francis Lai, Hal Shaper
- Producer: Unknown

Elton John singles chronology
"Rock and Roll Madonna" (1970)	"From Denver to L.A." (1970)	"Your Song" (1970)

"From Denver to L.A." is a song written by Francis Lai and Hal Shaper, and performed by British musician Elton John. It was released on the soundtrack of the 1970 movie The Games. The song was released as a single in the U.S. in July 1970, miscredited on the record label to "Elton Johns".

The single was issued just as John's career was starting to take off, but was quickly withdrawn because both John and his then-current record company objected to its release. It is now an extremely rare collector's item. John said of the song: "Actually, 'From Denver to L.A.' was withdrawn, so if you have got a copy, it's worth a small fortune. It was a 25 quid session I did at Olympic Studios and I just sang the song, and it was for the Michael Winner movie The Games. And that's it."

== Track listing ==
=== Promo 1 ===
1. "From Denver to L.A." (mono)
2. "From Denver to L.A." (stereo)

=== Promo 2 ===
1. "From Denver to L.A." (mono)
2. "Warm Summer Rain" (by the Barbara Moore Singers)

The B-side is also from the soundtrack, and is not an Elton John recording.
This single was withdrawn before any stock copies were released.
