= Lady Samantha =

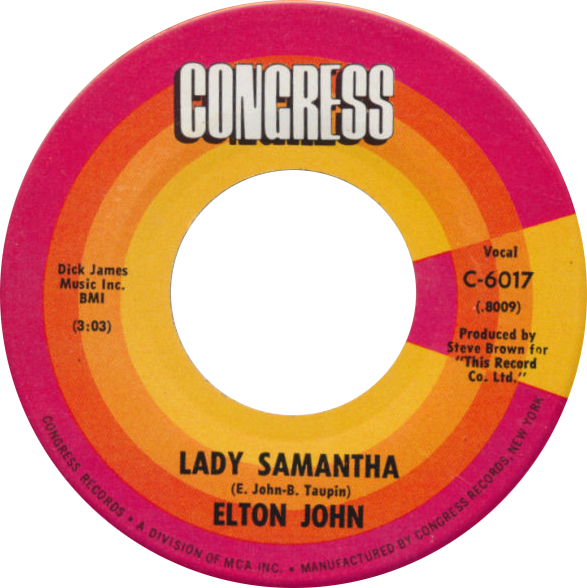
- Side A of the 1970 US reissue

Single by Elton John
- B-side: "All Across the Havens"; "It's Me That You Need" (US, 1970)
- Released: 17 January 1969
- Recorded: December 1968; DJM Studios
- Length: 3:04
- Label: Philips (UK 1969); DJM (US 1969); Congress (US 1970)
- Songwriter(s): Elton John; Bernie Taupin
- Producer(s): Steve Brown

Elton John singles chronology
"I've Been Loving You" (1968)	"Lady Samantha" (1969)	"It's Me That You Need" (1969)

"Lady Samantha" is a song by British musician Elton John with lyrics by Bernie Taupin. It was released on 17 January 1969 as his second single, six months before his first album, Empty Sky, came out. It appeared on its 1995 reissue as a bonus track.

== Performances ==
Recorded in December 1968 along with its B-side, "All Across the Havens", it was performed on several radio broadcasts including John's first BBC radio airing on 28 October 1968, with Caleb Quaye on guitar but forgotten afterward. Despite the performances, John never played it in concert.

== Chart performance and releases ==
John's first single, "I've Been Loving You", did not fare well on the British charts. This song went the same way. It was praised by critics, and yielded what producer Gus Dudgeon, who became a fan of the song upon hearing it on the radio, later called "a turntable hit". The song garnered a fair amount of airplay, but sold few copies and failed to chart. It was John's final single on the Philips label. This was also John's first American single, released on the DJM label in the United States, but it failed to chart there as well. It was re-released a year later, this time on the Congress label, but again failed to chart. Its B-side was his third British single, "It's Me That You Need".

"Lady Samantha" also surfaced in other reissue configurations, including as a double B-side (with "It's Me That You Need") to a DJM single issue of "Rocket Man" in 1972, and again as part of a DJM album compilation titled Lady Samantha, released in the US in 1980 and earlier in the UK in 1974 in cassette/8 track tape-only format with different cover art. This collection featured rarities and B-sides from the earliest days of John's career. It later also appeared on the MCA Records' 4-CD boxed set To Be Continued... in 1990, and on Mercury's 2-CD Rare Masters compilation released in 1992, prior to its inclusion as a bonus track on the CD reissue of Empty Sky in 1995, and finally on the "And This Is Me" section of Elton: Jewel Box in 2020.

Bernie Taupin remembers in His Song: The Musical Journey of Elton John by Elizabeth Rosenthal that the song was the first to represent the songwriting team's new direction, courtesy of advice from producer Steve Brown, who suggested the two should write what they like and please themselves, not the marketplace.

== Other versions ==
American rock group Three Dog Night recorded the song in 1969. It appeared as the second track on their second album, Suitable for Framing, and was also included on the band's retrospective compilation, Celebrate: The Three Dog Night Story.

New Zealand singer Shane Hales, known professionally as Shane, released the song as a single in 1969. It reached number 3 on charts of that country.

== Personnel ==
- Elton John – electric piano, organ, vocals
- Caleb Quaye – guitar
- Tony Murray – bass
- Roger Pope – drums
