= Caribou (album) =

Studio album by Elton John
- Released: 24 June 1974
- Recorded: January 1974
- Studios: Caribou Ranch, Nederland, Colorado; Brother, Santa Monica, California; Trident, London
- Genres: Rock; glam rock; pop
- Length: 45:15
- Labels: MCA (US), DJM (UK)
- Producer: Gus Dudgeon

Elton John chronology
Lady Samantha (1974)	Caribou (1974)	Greatest Hits (1974)

Singles from Caribou
- 1. "Don't Let the Sun Go Down on Me" Released: 24 May 1974; 2. "The Bitch Is Back" Released: 30 August 1974

Caribou is the eighth studio album by British musician Elton John, released on 24 June 1974 by MCA Records in the US and on 28 June by DJM Records in the UK. It was his fourth chart-topping album in the United States and his third in the United Kingdom. The album contains the singles "Don't Let the Sun Go Down on Me", which reached number 16 on the UK Singles Chart and number two in the US, and "The Bitch Is Back", which reached number 15 in the UK and number four in the US. Both singles reached number one in Canada on the RPM 100 national Top Singles Chart, as did the album itself.

The album was met with indifferent reviews on its release and legacy reviews do not consider the record to be among John's best work from his early 1970s peak period. However, the album was a commercial success and has been certified double-platinum in the US as well as receiving a gold certification in the UK. The album was nominated for the Grammy Award for Album of the Year at the 17th Annual Grammy Awards.

== Background ==
In the liner notes to the 1995 CD re-release, Elton John described the album as being recorded quickly in January 1974, with only about nine days to get everything recorded, because he and the band "were under enormous pressure" to finish the album and immediately embark on a Japanese tour. Producer Gus Dudgeon added additional backing vocals, horns and other overdubs after John and the band had finished their work. Dudgeon later called the album "a piece of crap ... the sound is the worst, the songs are nowhere, the sleeve came out wrong, the lyrics weren't that good, the singing wasn't all there, the playing wasn't great and the production is just plain lousy".

The album was named after the Caribou Ranch recording studio in Nederland, Colorado, where part of the album was recorded.

"Ticking" tells the story of a man suffering from a repressed childhood who kills 14 people in a mass shooting at a bar in New York City. Despite being described by Rolling Stone critic Tom Nolan as "the centerpiece fiasco" of the album in his 1974 review of Caribou, in 2015, Rolling Stone readers voted the song their second-favourite "deep cut" of lesser-known Elton John songs.

In addition to the singles, John has over the years played several other songs from the album at concerts, including "Grimsby", "You're So Static", "Ticking" and "Dixie Lily". The 1995 CD reissue contains four songs from the general period in and around the release of Caribou, though only two of them, the B-sides "Sick City" and "Cold Highway", were recorded during the album sessions. "Step into Christmas" was recorded during a previous one-off single session, and "Pinball Wizard" was recorded at The Who's Ramport Studios in England during the sessions for the movie score and soundtrack album of Tommy.

In February 2024, it was announced Mercury Records would reissue the album as 2-LP set on April 20 as part of Record Store Day to celebrate the 50th Anniversary of the album's original release in summer 1974. Pressed on blue sky colored vinyl, LP 1 contains the original album. The second LP includes the b-sides "Sick City" and "Cold Highway," John's version of "Pinball Wizard," a new "radio mix" of "The Bitch Is Back" featuring an alternate saxophone solo, a new extended version of the album track "Stinker," the outtake "Ducktail Jiver," which was recorded during the Caribou sessions, and John's demo version of "Snookeroo," later recorded by Ringo Starr for his album Goodnight Vienna.

== Critical reception ==
Professional ratings
Review scores
Source	Rating
AllMusic	3.5/5 stars
Christgau's Record Guide	B+
The Encyclopedia of Popular Music	3/5 stars
Tom Hull – on the Web	B

Tom Nolan of Rolling Stone described the album as "dispiriting" and said, "Nearly every song on Caribou suffers from a blithe lack of focus, an almost arrogant disregard of the need to establish context or purpose ... Shifting from sentimental to heavy to mocking, [John and Bernie Taupin] not only fail to touch all bases but undercut what credence they might possibly have achieved." Criticising the album's production and the superficiality of the songs, he concluded that Caribou is "a startlingly empty experience".

Stephen Thomas Erlewine's retrospective review for AllMusic called Caribou "a disappointment" and that aside from the two singles, "the album tracks tend to be ridiculous filler on the order of 'Solar Prestige a Gammon' or competent genre exercises like 'You're So Static'".

== Track listing ==
All tracks are written by Elton John and Bernie Taupin, except where noted.

Side one
No.	Title	Length
1.	"The Bitch Is Back"	3:44
2.	"Pinky"	3:54
3.	"Grimsby"	3:46
4.	"Dixie Lily"	2:55
5.	"Solar Prestige a Gammon"	2:52
6.	"You're So Static"	4:53

Side two
No.	Title	Length
7.	"I've Seen the Saucers"	4:48
8.	"Stinker"	5:20
9.	"Don't Let the Sun Go Down on Me"	5:36
10.	"Ticking"	7:34
Total length:		45:15

Bonus tracks (1995 Mercury and 2001 Rocket reissue)
No.	Title	Writer(s)	Length
11.	"Pinball Wizard"	Pete Townshend	5:09
12.	"Sick City"		5:23
13.	"Cold Highway"		3:25
14.	"Step into Christmas"		4:32
Total length:			63:44

Note

- Track numbers refer to CD and digital releases of the album.
- On the 1995 CD reissue, "You're So Static" is spelled incorrectly as "Your're So Static".

== Personnel ==
=== Musicians ===
- Elton John – lead vocals, acoustic piano, Hammond organ (9)
- David Hentschel – ARP synthesizer (2, 5, 10), mellotron (9)
- Chester D. Thompson – Hammond organ (8)
- Davey Johnstone – acoustic guitar, electric guitar, mandolin, backing vocals
- Dee Murray – bass guitar, backing vocals
- Nigel Olsson – drums, backing vocals
- Ray Cooper – tambourine, congas, whistle, vibraphone, snare, castanets, tubular bells, maracas, water gong
- Lenny Pickett – tenor saxophone solo (1), soprano saxophone solo (4, 5), clarinet (5)
- Tower of Power – horn section (1, 6, 8, 9)
  - Emilio Castillo – tenor saxophone
  - Steve Kupka – baritone saxophone
  - Lenny Pickett – tenor saxophone, soprano saxophone, clarinet
  - Mic Gillette – trombone, trumpet
  - Greg Adams – trumpet, horn arrangements (1, 6, 8)
- Del Newman – horn arrangements (9)
- Clydie King – backing vocals (1, 6)
- Sherlie Matthews – backing vocals (1)
- Jessie Mae Smith – backing vocals (1)
- Dusty Springfield – backing vocals (1)
- Billy Hinsche – backing vocals (9)
- Bruce Johnston – backing vocals (9)
- Toni Tennille – backing vocals (9)
- Carl Wilson – backing vocals (9), vocal arrangements (9)
- Daryl Dragon – vocal arrangements (9)

=== Production ===
- Producer – Gus Dudgeon
- Engineer – Clive Franks
- Remixing – David Hentschel
- Assistant engineer – Peter Kelsey
- Album coordinator – Steve Brown
- Liner notes – John Tobler
- Art direction and sleeve design – David Larkham and Michael Ross
- Photography – Ed Caraeff and Chris Denny
- Recorded at Caribou Ranch
- Remixed at Trident Studios (London, UK)

== Accolades ==
Grammy Awards

Year	Nominee / work	Award	Result
1975	Caribou	Album of the Year	Nominated

== Charts ==
=== Weekly charts ===
Chart (1974–1975)	Peak position
Australian Albums (Kent Music Report)	1
Canada Top Albums/CDs (RPM)	1
Danish Albums (Hitlisten)	1
Finnish Albums (The Official Finnish Charts)	21
German Albums (Offizielle Top 100)	30
Italian Albums (Musica e Dischi)	8
Japanese Albums (Oricon)	2
New Zealand Albums (RMNZ)	20
Norwegian Albums (VG-lista)	6
Spanish Albums-(AFYVE )	4
Swedish Albums (Sverigetopplistan)	3
UK Albums (Official Charts)	1
US Billboard 200	1
Yugoslav Albums Chart	5

=== Year-end charts ===
Chart (1974)	Position
Australian Albums (Kent Music Report)	4
Canada Top Albums/CDs (RPM)	7
UK Albums (OCC)	15
US Billboard Year-End	65

Chart (1975)	Position
US Billboard Year-End	71

== Certifications ==
Region	Certification	Certified units/sales
Australia (ARIA)	2× Platinum	100,000^{^}
Canada (Music Canada)	Platinum	100,000^{^}
United Kingdom (BPI)	Gold	100,000^{^}
United States (RIAA)	2× Platinum	2,000,000^{^}
^{^} Shipments figures based on certification alone.
