= Step into Christmas =

1973 Christmas song by Elton John

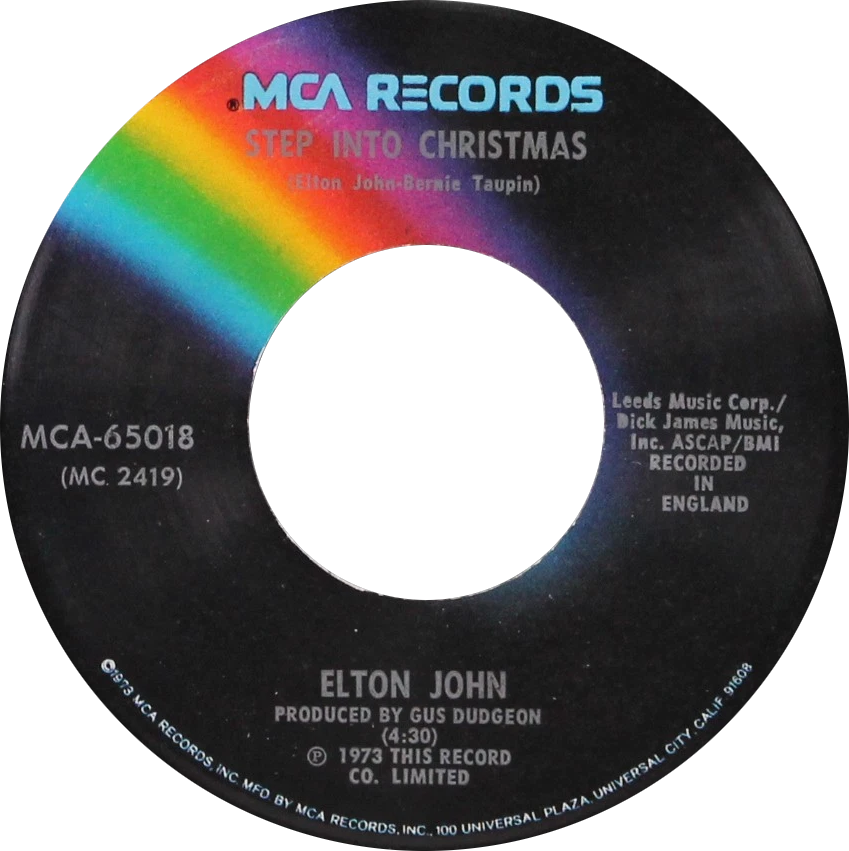
- One of side-A labels of the 1973 US single

Single by Elton John
- B-side: "Ho, Ho, Ho (Who'd Be a Turkey at Christmas)"
- Released: 23 November 1973
- Recorded: 11 November 1973
- Studio: Morgan (London)
- Genre: Pop rock, Christmas music
- Length: 4:30
- Label: DJM; MCA
- Songwriters: Elton John; Bernie Taupin
- Producer: Gus Dudgeon

Elton John singles chronology
"Goodbye Yellow Brick Road" (1973)	"Step into Christmas" (1973)	"Bennie and the Jets" (1974)

Official video
- "Step into Christmas" on YouTube

"Step into Christmas" is a Christmas song written by British musician Elton John and lyricist Bernie Taupin, and performed by John. Released in November 1973 with "Ho, Ho, Ho (Who'd Be a Turkey at Christmas)" as the B-side, the song originally peaked at No. 24 on the UK singles chart. It made the top 10 for the first time in 2018, at No. 10, before reaching a new overall peak position of No. 7 on the same chart in 2025. In the United States, the single reached No. 56 on the Cash Box Top 100 Singles chart and No. 1 on the Billboard Christmas Singles chart. (Note: In years when Billboard published a Christmas Singles chart, Christmas singles were not listed on the Hot 100 chart.)

"Step into Christmas" was later included as a bonus track on the 1995 remastered reissue of the album Caribou. It also appears on the albums Elton John's Christmas Party, Rare Masters, To Be Continued, Diamonds, and various Christmas themed compilations. Two versions with different vocals are known to exist: the original single mix and a version recorded for John's 1973 performance of "Step into Christmas" on The Gilbert O'Sullivan Show television programme (which featured his friend and lyricist Bernie Taupin standing in for Ray Cooper on percussion).

In 2009, "Step into Christmas" was listed as the ninth-most-played Christmas song of the 2000s in the UK. In December 2023, the song was certified triple platinum by the British Phonographic Industry for sales and streams of 1,800,000 units and on 12 December it was certified 4× Platinum in the UK.

In September 2021, the song was certified gold by the Recording Industry Association of America for sales and streams of 500,000 units. In December 2025, it was certified platinum for sales of 1 million units.

In November 2026, a version with CMAT was released.

== Recording ==
According to liner notes about the song (in Rare Masters and Elton John's Christmas Party), the track and its B-side, both produced by Gus Dudgeon, were recorded during a session on 11 November 1973 at London's Morgan Studios, which was owned by drummer Barry Morgan, who had played on several of John's early albums. "Step into Christmas" was mixed to imitate the work of producer Phil Spector, using compression and utilizing his trademark wall of sound technique. According to both John and Taupin, this was an homage to Christmas songs by Spector-produced groups such as the Ronettes.

== Music video ==
The music video produced to promote the single features the band playing the song in a recording studio, with John playing at a piano adorned with a red feather boa. It is notable for its cameo appearance of Taupin, who is seen briefly during the song's bridge playing tubular bells, although they are played on the track by percussionist Ray Cooper, and again dancing at the very end of the video. John is also seen playfully holding his supporter's card for Watford F.C., the football club which he would later own. Later in the video John is seeing playing a guitar alongside drummer Nigel Olsson and then embracing him, and briefly with drum sticks inserted into the ends of his mouth.

In 2024, over 50 years after the song's original release, the video was remade as a behind-the-scenes reimagining starring Cara Delevingne as John. Delevingne wears an outfit identical to the one worn by John in the original video. Delevingne and John had wanted to work together and thought of the idea while at Glastonbury Festival 2024. John stated: "When someone suggested the idea of her playing me in a riff on the 1973 'Step Into Christmas' video, I just thought it was the perfect opportunity. Thank God Cara thought the same, because it came out great."

== Chart performance ==
Chart performance on the UK Singles Chart
UK Singles Chart
Year	Peak position	Chart run
1973	24	Seven weeks (8 December 1973 – 19 January 1974)
2007	53	Three weeks (15–29 December 2007)
2011	64	Three weeks (17–31 December 2011)
2012	75	Two weeks (15–22 December 2012)
2014	84	Four weeks (13 December 2014 – 3 January 2015)
2015	58	Three weeks (17–31 December 2015)
2016	37	Four weeks (15 December 2016 – 5 January 2017)
2017	11	Four weeks (14 December 2017 – 4 January 2018)
2018	10	Four weeks (13 December 2018 – 3 January 2019)
2019	8	Four weeks (12 December 2019 – 2 January 2020)
2020	8	Seven weeks (26 November 2020 – 7 January 2021)
2021	11	Six weeks (2 December 2021 – 6 January 2022)
2022	18	Six weeks (1 December 2022 – 5 January 2023)
2023	16	Six weeks (30 November 2023 – 4 January 2024)
2024	10	Six weeks (28 November 2024 – 2 January 2025)
2025	7	Seven weeks (20 November 2025 – 8 January 2026)

== Charts ==
Chart performance for "Step into Christmas"
Chart (1973–2026)	Peak position
Australia (ARIA)	31
Austria (Ö3 Austria Top 40)	40
Canada Hot 100 (Billboard)	27
Croatia International Airplay (Top lista)	33
Germany (GfK)	38
Global 200 (Billboard)	35
Greece International Streaming (IFPI)	46
Italy (FIMI)	81
Lithuania (AGATA)	52
Lithuania Airplay (TopHit)	46
Netherlands (Single Top 100)	54
New Zealand (Recorded Music NZ)	25
Poland (Polish Streaming Top 100)	76
Portugal (AFP)	83
Sweden (Sverigetopplistan)	67
Switzerland (Schweizer Hitparade)	29
UK Singles (Official Charts)	7
US Billboard Christmas Singles	1
US Holiday 100 (Billboard)	49
US Cash Box Top 100 Singles	56

== Certifications ==
Certifications for "Step into Christmas"
Region	Certification	Certified units/sales
Australia (ARIA)	Platinum	70,000^{‡}
Canada (Music Canada)	2× Platinum	160,000^{‡}
Denmark (IFPI Danmark)	Platinum	90,000^{‡}
Italy (FIMI) (since 2009)	Gold	50,000^{‡}
New Zealand (RMNZ)	Platinum	30,000^{‡}
United Kingdom (BPI)	4× Platinum	2,400,000^{‡}
United States (RIAA)	Platinum	1,000,000^{‡}
^{‡} Sales+streaming figures based on certification alone.
