= Rock and Roll Madonna =

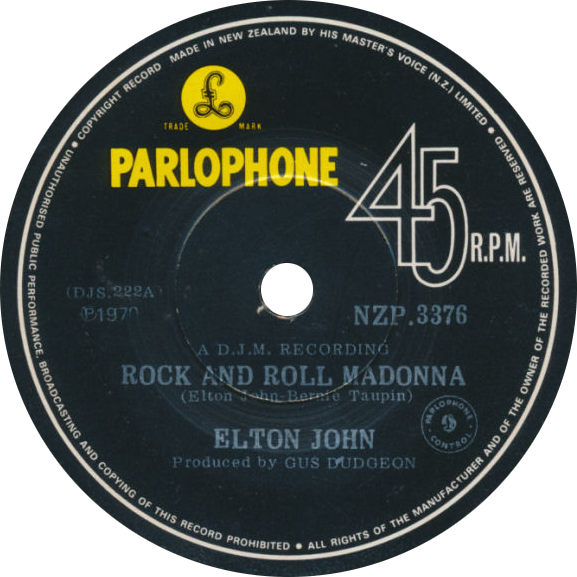
- Side A of the New Zealand single

Single by Elton John
- B-side: "Grey Seal"
- Released: 19 June 1970
- Recorded: 20 March 1970
- Studio: Trident Studios
- Genre: Rock and roll
- Length: 4:17
- Label: Philips, DJM, Congress, Hansa
- Songwriters: Elton John; Bernie Taupin
- Producer: Gus Dudgeon

Elton John singles chronology
"Border Song" (1970)	"Rock and Roll Madonna" (1970)	"From Denver to L.A." (1970)

"Rock and Roll Madonna" is a song written by British musician Elton John and lyricist Bernie Taupin, and performed by John. The song was released as a single in England in 1970, where it never charted. It appeared on several bootlegs and rarities compilations, such as 1992's Rare Masters, before it appeared on the 1995 remaster of his self-titled album (Note: However, the original German release of his self-titled album (Hansa 80807) opens with the song, and the song "I Need You to Turn To" does not appear on the LP. The rest of the tracks and the running order remain the same as the worldwide release.) and to the 2008 deluxe edition of the same album, along with two previously unreleased demo versions of the song.

The song structure is a rock and roll song. Live effects have been added, with an audience cheering throughout most of the song, a technique that would be used similarly three years later on "Bennie and the Jets". The B-side, "Grey Seal", was re-recorded in 1973 for inclusion on John's seventh album, Goodbye Yellow Brick Road.

The song was remade in an "interlude" version for the 2019 film Rocketman with star Taron Egerton performing the vocal.

== Track listing ==
- 1970 UK 7" single
1. "Rock and Roll Madonna" – 4:17
2. "Grey Seal (Original Version)" – 3:38

== Personnel ==
- Elton John – piano, vocals
- Caleb Quaye – guitar
- Roger Pope – drums
- Dave Glover – bass

== Rocketman (2019) film ==
The 2019 biopic Rocketman featured 22 of Elton John's songs including hits, like "Your Song", and uncharted songs, like "Rock and Roll Madonna". In the film, "Rock and Roll Madonna" is featured as an interlude version with the vocals performed by actor Taron Egerton.
