= Saturday Night's Alright for Fighting =

1973 single by Elton John

Single by Elton John

from the album Goodbye Yellow Brick Road
- B-side: "Jack Rabbit"; "Whenever You're Ready (We'll Go Steady Again)"
- Released: 29 June 1973
- Recorded: May 1973
- Studio: Château d'Hérouville, France
- Genre: Glam rock; rock and roll; proto-punk
- Length: 4:57
- Label: MCA; DJM
- Songwriters: Elton John; Bernie Taupin
- Producer: Gus Dudgeon

Elton John singles chronology
"Daniel" (1973)	"Saturday Night's Alright for Fighting" (1973)	"Goodbye Yellow Brick Road" (1973)

"Saturday Night's Alright for Fighting" (sometimes written "Saturday Night's Alright (For Fighting)") is a song by the British musician Elton John and lyricist Bernie Taupin, performed by John. It was released as the first single from John's best-selling album Goodbye Yellow Brick Road (1973). It has been covered by many artists and featured on motion picture, video game, and television soundtracks.

Billboard found the song to be a cross between John's earlier single "Crocodile Rock" and the Rolling Stones' single "Street Fighting Man", suggesting that it may be a parody of the Rolling Stones but regardless is a "great fun record".

== Background ==
"Saturday Night's Alright for Fighting" is a lively throwback to early rock and roll with a glam edge. The lyrics refer among other things to a night out in town in which the narrator plans to "get about as oiled as a diesel train". Taupin has said that the song was meant to be an American rock and roll song set in Britain. It was inspired by his raucous teenage days and in particular, the fistfights in his local pub, the Aston Arms in Market Rasen.

== Composition and recording ==
The song showcases the guitar playing of Davey Johnstone with lyrics by Bernie Taupin and music by John. It is one of John's harder-rocking songs (similar to "Grow Some Funk of Your Own" and "The Bitch Is Back"), with a sound echoing bands such as the Who and the Rolling Stones.

It was the only song that John and his band recorded in Jamaica, where they had initially planned to record the album, but was never used due to the poor quality of the recording equipment. John described it as sounding like "it had been recorded on the worst transistor radio." The experience prompted the band to return to France to finish the album.

"Saturday" is one of the most aggressive and lively rock inspired tracks ever recorded by John. It features energetic, rapid-fire piano playing reminiscent of Jerry Lee Lewis. The song was one of the few John-Taupin songs that Elton said was not a "typical piano number". According to John's recollection in Elizabeth Rosenthal's His Song: The Musical Journey of Elton John, it may have been written on the piano at first, but the song ended up being recorded somewhat in reverse to the normal way he records, with the band putting their tracks down, and Elton overdubbing his piano afterward. (John's typical process was to either record the piano first or play along with the band.) Elton called the song "hard to record".

Apart from his lyrical contributions, in the Eagle Vision documentary, Classic Albums: Goodbye Yellow Brick Road, Taupin said that a lot of the power of the song comes from the chords, adding it also features what he called one of the greatest "strident, blistering guitar chords ever created" in rock and roll.

== Release ==
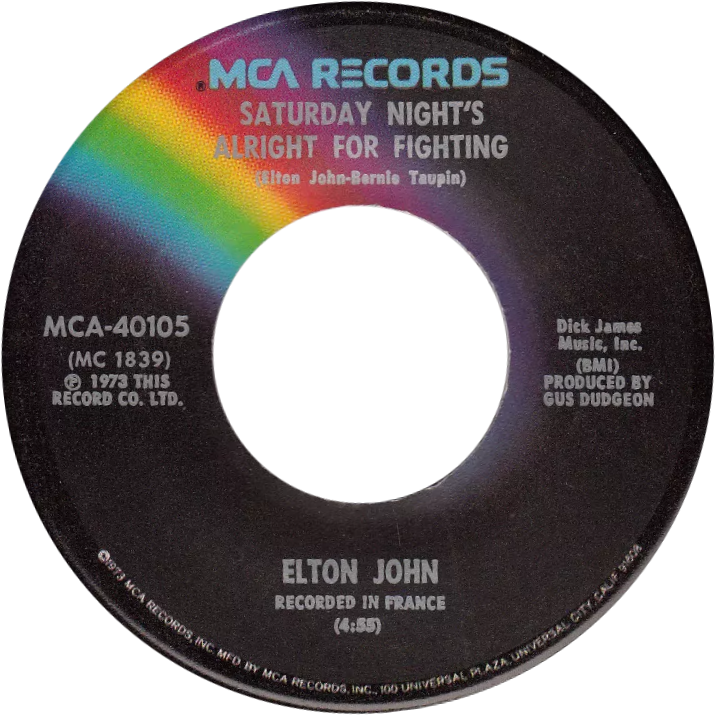
One of side-A labels of the 1973 US single

The song was released in 1973 as the album's first single. Cash Box called the song an "infectious rocker that carries 'Crocodile Rock' just one step further". Record World called it a "rip-snortin' rocker that is reminiscent of the Stones and Bowie" with "lotsa high-powered energy".

In the UK, the song entered the Music Week Top 50 the week of 7 July 1973, rose to No. 7, and stayed in the charts for 9 weeks and is one of John's most critically and commercially successful singles in that country.

In the US, the song entered the Billboard Top 40 the week of 11 August 1973, rose to No. 12, and stayed in the Top 40 for nine weeks. It was the only single by Elton John that failed to make the Top 10 in the three-year, 13-hit period between May 1972 ("Rocket Man") and October 1975 ("Island Girl"). It was the only Elton John single that failed to go gold or platinum in the three-year, 11-hit period between December 1972 ("Crocodile Rock") and October 1975 ("Island Girl").

Despite only being a modest success compared to his other hits, it remains one of his best-known songs as the song has been a staple of John's live performances for many years, being played more than 1,800 times live (making it one of John's top ten most performed tracks in his entire discography) as of December 2015.

== Cover versions ==
"Saturday Night's Alright for Fighting" has been covered by Fall Out Boy and Nickelback. It was also sampled in the hit "Gloria" by Umberto Tozzi in 1979.

A live performance featuring American recording artist Anastacia was released in 2000 as part of John's live album One Night Only.

== Track listing ==
All songs written by Elton John and Bernie Taupin

1. "Saturday Night's Alright for Fighting" – 4:12
2. "Jack Rabbit" – 1:50
3. "Whenever You're Ready (We'll Go Steady Again)" – 2:50

Both B-sides were included later on Rare Masters and issued as bonus tracks on the remastered edition of Don't Shoot Me I'm Only the Piano Player.

== In popular culture ==
- Since June 2023, the song has been used as the opening theme for the professional wrestling television show Collision produced by AEW, which airs on Saturday nights.

== Charts ==
Chart (1973)	Peak position
Canada Top Singles (RPM)	12
Spanish Singles Chart	21
UK Singles Chart	7
US Billboard Hot 100	12

== Certifications ==
Region	Certification	Certified units/sales
New Zealand (RMNZ)	Platinum	30,000^{‡}
United Kingdom (BPI)	Platinum	600,000^{‡}
United States (RIAA)	Platinum	1,000,000^{‡}
^{‡} Sales+streaming figures based on certification alone.

== Personnel ==
- Elton John – piano, vocals
- Davey Johnstone – electric guitars
- Dee Murray – bass
- Nigel Olsson – drums
