= Border Song =

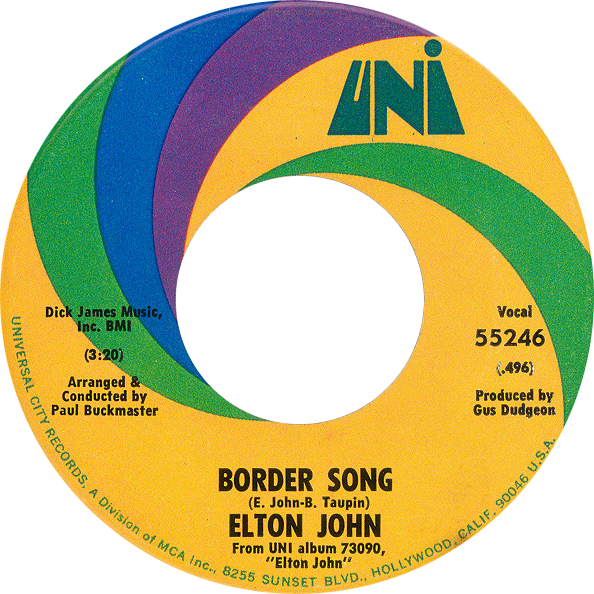
- One of side-A labels of the US reissue (Uni Records)

Single by Elton John

from the album Elton John
- B-side: "Bad Side of the Moon"
- Released: 20 March 1970
- Recorded: January 1970
- Studio: Trident Studios (London, England)
- Length: 3:22
- Label: Uni (US); DJM Records (UK)
- Songwriters: Elton John; Bernie Taupin
- Producer: Gus Dudgeon

Elton John singles chronology
"It's Me That You Need" (1969)	"Border Song" (1970)	"Rock and Roll Madonna" (1970)

"Border Song" is a song by Elton John with music by John and lyrics by Bernie Taupin. The song initially appeared on the 1970 album Elton John, and was released in the spring of 1970 as the LP's first single. After failing to chart in the UK, it was released in North America a few months later. It met with more success there, especially in Canada, where it peaked at No. 34. The appearance of "Border Song" on the Canadian charts was John's first chart appearance in any country.

"Border Song" was also John's first song to chart in the United States, peaking at No. 92 on the Billboard Hot 100 and No. 69 in the Cash Box Top 100 in October 1970. A cover by soul icon Aretha Franklin (with "Holy Moses" following the title in parentheses to reflect the repeated phrase in the song) fared better reaching No. 37 in the Billboard Hot 100 and No. 23 in the Cash Box Top 100 in December 1970. It was included as the closing track of Aretha's 1972 Young, Gifted and Black album as well.

In the Netherlands it peaked at No. 29 in the Dutch Top 40 in January 1971.

== Music and lyrics ==
The song's melody is similar to that of a spiritual. A choir sings during an instrumental break led by John's piano.

John determined the song was too short and added the final verse himself. According to Taupin, "The sentiments in that song, in fact, didn't mean anything. The great thing about Elton's last verse was he tried to put it all into perspective. That song is probably two totally separate songs."

== Reception ==
Record World said that "it is nothing short of fantastic". Record World also praised the "fantastic piano". Cash Box said that "The surface simplicity and material depth of a Randy Newman are reflected in this tremendous top forty/underground shot from Elton John. The artist's power should give him his first taste of American recognition through this scintillating masterwork." Billboard said that it was "more potent message material with a driving and equally potent vocal workout."

== Format and track list ==
- 1970 US/Canadian 7" single
1. "Border Song" – 3:22
2. "Bad Side of the Moon" – 3:15

== Personnel ==
- Elton John – piano, lead vocals
- Madeline Bell – backing vocals
- Tony Burrows – backing vocals
- Roger Cook – backing vocals
- Brian Dee – organ
- Lesley Duncan – backing vocals
- Kay Garner – backing vocals
- Colin Green – guitar
- Tony Hazzard – backing vocals
- Clive Hicks – guitar
- Barry Morgan – drums
- Dave Richmond – bass
- Choir led by Barbara Moore
- Arranged and conducted by Paul Buckmaster

== Charts ==
Chart (1970)	Peak position
Canada Top Singles (RPM)	34
Netherlands (Single Top 100)	25
US Billboard Hot 100	92
US Cash Box Top 100	69

== Cover versions ==
US vinyl release of Aretha Franklin's recording

- Aretha Franklin's 1972 album Young, Gifted and Black concludes with her solo cover of this song. Cashbox said of this version that Franklin "brings the song to a boil in an almost-spiritual arrangement of the Elton John hit."
- Elton John and Aretha Franklin performed the song together on Franklin's 1993 Duets special.

== B-side ==
The song's B-side, "Bad Side of the Moon", was subsequently covered by Canadian rock band April Wine, whose version is on the 1972 album On Record and was released as their second single from that album, reaching No. 16 in the Canadian singles charts.
