= It's Me That You Need =

Single by Elton John
- B-side: "Just Like Strange Rain"
- Released: 16 May 1969
- Recorded: 10 April 1969
- Studio: Olympic Studios
- Genre: Rock; pop
- Length: 4:01
- Label: DJM Records
- Songwriter(s): Elton John, Bernie Taupin
- Producer(s): Steve Brown

Elton John singles chronology
"Lady Samantha" (1969)	"It's Me That You Need" (1969)	"Border Song" (1970)

"It's Me That You Need" is a song by British musician Elton John with lyrics by Bernie Taupin.

== Release and performances ==
It was his third single, released almost four months after "Lady Samantha". It has a light pop sense and was penned by critics to be a radio hit. However, it actually performed worse than his previous two singles and also failed to chart in the US and the UK.

The song did become a hit in Japan two years later, peaking at the No. 13 on the country's Oricon sales chart, and No. 2 on the international chart. It had been the most commercially successful song for Elton in that country, until the double A-side single "Candle in the Wind 1997" / "Something About the Way You Look Tonight" topped the chart in October 1997.

John played a solo version live as the first song on his 1971 tour of Japan. It was heavily applauded, as it was his first single to be released there. Since then, it has not been played anywhere.

== Composition ==
=== Musical structure ===
It opens with a string section accompanied by a Hohner Pianet electric piano. When the song begins, a somewhat distorted electric guitar plays with strings. Horns are also featured. These two features would be standard in later releases by John. The song ends with John playing solo for the last fifteen seconds.

=== Lyrical meaning ===
It is a plain love song. However, the words are a bit advanced and more cryptic for other love songs at the time of its release. It tells a story about a man who is convinced he is the right one for the woman he is adoring. The last verse could also indicate that it is a story of an ex-girlfriend;

"Watching, watching the swallows fly
It all means the same
Just like them
You can fly home again
But don't, no don't forget yesterday
Pride is an ugly word girl
And you still know my name"

== Covers ==
As with many British songs at the time, it was covered elsewhere in Europe.

In Italy, it was covered by Maurizio Vandelli, who had translated the song into Italian. It was called "Era Lei" (literally meaning "That Was Her") and the lyrical meaning had been slightly altered. This version charted in Italy and became a big hit.

== Personnel ==
- Elton John – Hohner Pianet electric piano, vocals
- Caleb Quaye – guitar
- Clive Franks – bass
- Roger Pope – drums
- Cy Payne – orchestral arranger, conductor

== Chart history ==
Chart (1971)	Peak position	Sales
Japanese Oricon International Singles Chart	2	144,000+
Japanese Oricon Singles Chart	13	144,000+
