= Goodbye Yellow Brick Road (song) =

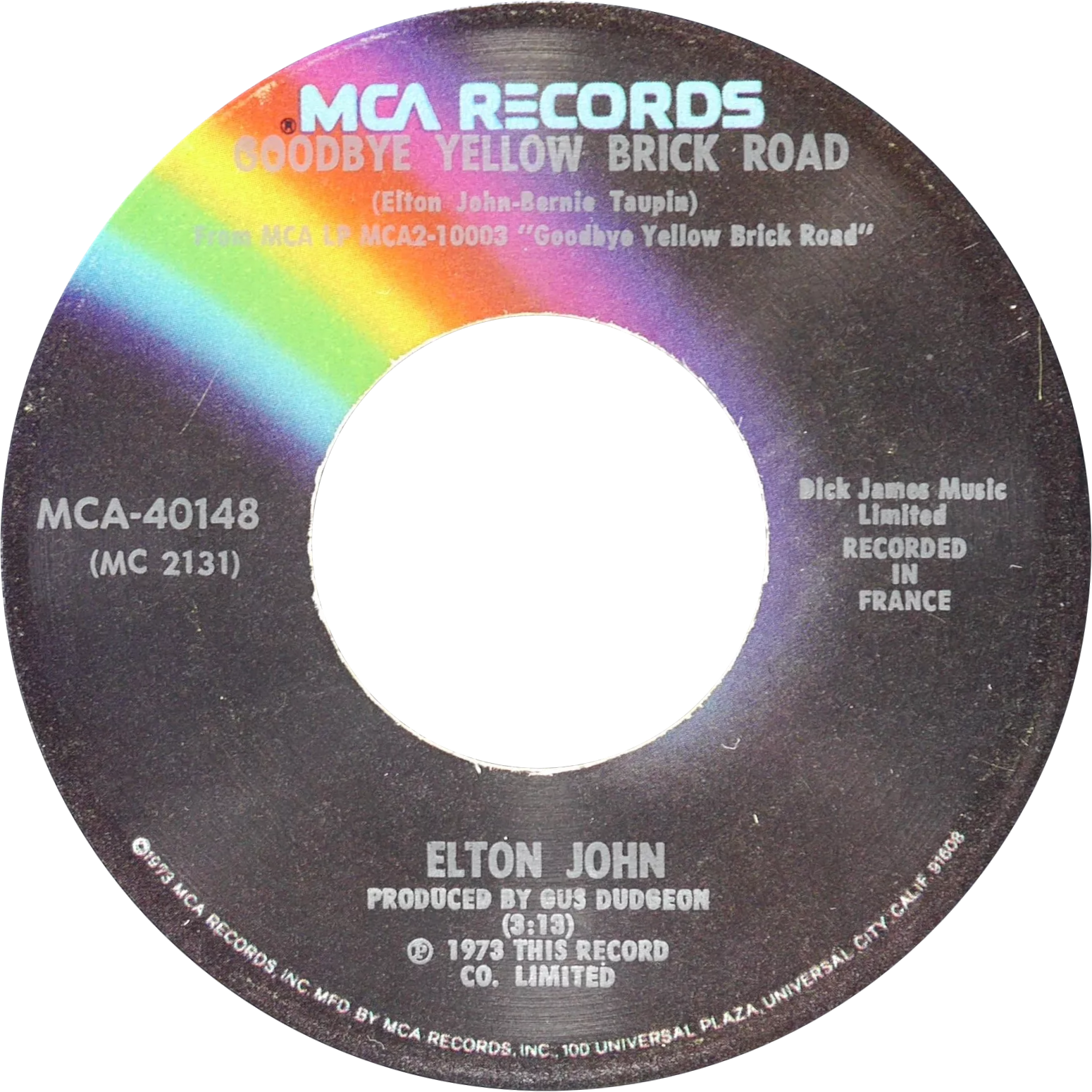
- One of side-A labels of the US single

Single by Elton John

from the album Goodbye Yellow Brick Road
- B-side: "Screw You (Young Man's Blues)"
- Released: 7 September 1973 (UK); 15 October 1973 (US)
- Recorded: 10 May 1973
- Studio: Château d'Hérouville, France
- Genre: Pop; soft rock; glam rock
- Length: 3:14
- Label: MCA; DJM
- Songwriters: Elton John; Bernie Taupin
- Producer: Gus Dudgeon

Elton John singles chronology
"Saturday Night's Alright for Fighting" (1973)	"Goodbye Yellow Brick Road" (1973)	"Step into Christmas" (1973)

"Goodbye Yellow Brick Road" is a song written by British musician Elton John and lyricist Bernie Taupin, and performed by John. It is the title track on John's album of the same name. The titular road is a reference to L. Frank Baum's The Wizard of Oz film and book series.

The song has been widely praised by critics; some consider it a strong contender for John's finest song ever. Rolling Stone listed the song at No. 390 of its 500 greatest songs of all time in 2010. In the US, it was certified gold on 4 January 1974 and platinum on 13 September 1995 and 2× platinum on 2 March 2020 by the Recording Industry Association of America (RIAA).

== Composition ==
The lyrics, written by Taupin, contain autobiographical elements, referring to his childhood on a farm in Lincolnshire. The song expresses a desire to get back to one's "roots", a common theme of Taupin's early lyrics.

In 2014, Taupin reflected, "It's been said many times, but Goodbye Yellow Brick Road is a cinematic album. The lyrics to the title track do say that I want to leave Oz and get back to the farm. I think that's still my M.O. these days. I don't mind getting out there and doing what everybody else was doing, but I always had to have an escape hatch."

In 2020, he added, "I don't believe I was ever turning my back on success or saying I didn't want it. I just don't believe I was ever that naïve. I think I was just hoping that maybe there was a happy medium way to exist successfully in a more tranquil setting. My only naïveté, I guess, was believing I could do it so early on. I had to travel a long road and visit the school of hard knocks before I could come even close to achieving that goal."

== Release and reception ==
=== Release ===
After being recorded in May 1973, the song was released in late 1973 as the album's second single and entered the top ten in both the United Kingdom and the United States. It was one of John's biggest hits, and quickly surpassed his previous single, "Saturday Night's Alright for Fighting", in both sales and popularity, following its release.

=== Critical response ===
"Goodbye Yellow Brick Road" received generally positive response from music critics. Janis Schacht of Circus describes it as "delicate and beautiful". AllMusic writes that the song is "a vocal triumph" and a "pinnacle of its style". Billboard stated that the song's "sonic impression is still strong and haunting" and the "blending of voices with strings on the bridges is beautiful," although the lyrics are sometimes difficult to understand. Cash Box described the song as "soft, melodic pop that’s going to impress folks all over again as to [John's] performing abilities," going on to say that "Bernie Taupin’s lyrics are again highly poetic and blend perfectly with Elton's music." Record World called it "a gorgeous John-Taupin tune that rivals their very best compositions" with a "beautiful melody woven through a standout lyric."

In 2010, Rolling Stone magazine ranked it No. 390 in their list of the 500 Greatest Songs of All Time.

In 2018, The Guardian ranked the song number six on their list of the 50 greatest Elton John songs, and in 2022, Billboard ranked the song number four on their list of the 75 greatest Elton John songs.

== Chart performance ==
In Canada, the single reached No. 1 on the RPM 100 national singles chart on 22 December 1973 and held the position for one week, making it John's third No. 1 in the year 1973 in that country (following "Crocodile Rock" and "Daniel"). On the US Hot 100, it went to No. 2, behind both "Top of the World" by the Carpenters and "The Most Beautiful Girl" by Charlie Rich. On the US Easy Listening chart, it rose to No. 7 and spent 18 weeks on the charts. In Ireland, it reached No. 4; in the UK it peaked at No. 6.

== B-side ==
The song's flip side was originally titled "Screw You", although the US release re-titled the song "Young Man's Blues" so that it would not offend American record buyers.

== Live performances ==
John's One Night Only: The Greatest Hits Live at Madison Square Garden featured this song performed as a duet with Billy Joel.

"Goodbye Yellow Brick Road" was regularly included in John's live performances, and John named his farewell tour after the song, naming it the Farewell Yellow Brick Road Tour.

== Personnel ==
- Elton John – piano, vocals
- Davey Johnstone – Leslie electric guitar, backing vocals
- Dee Murray – bass, backing vocals
- Nigel Olsson – drums, backing vocals
- Del Newman – orchestral arrangement

== Charts ==
=== Weekly charts ===
Chart (1973–1974)	Peak position
Australia (Kent Music Report)	4
Canada Top Singles (RPM)	1
Canada RPM Adult Contemporary	1
German Singles Chart	49
Irish Singles Chart	4
Netherlands (Single Top 100)	23
New Zealand (Listener)	2
Norway (VG-lista)	9
South African Singles Chart	7
Spanish Singles Chart	17
UK Singles (Official Charts)	6
US Billboard Hot 100	2
US Adult Contemporary (Billboard)	7
Cash Box Top 100	1

Chart (2019)	Peak position
US Hot Rock & Alternative Songs (Billboard)	17

=== Monthly charts ===
Monthly chart performance for "Goodbye Yellow Brick Road"
Chart (1977)	Peak position
Soviet Union International Songs (MK)	7

=== Year-end charts ===
Chart (1973)	Rank
Canada	41

Chart (1974)	Rank
Australia (Kent Music Report)	25
Brazil (Crowley)	3
US Billboard Hot 100	72

== Certifications ==
Region	Certification	Certified units/sales
Denmark (IFPI Danmark)	Gold	45,000^{‡}
New Zealand (RMNZ)	3× Platinum	90,000^{‡}
United Kingdom (BPI)	Platinum	600,000^{‡}
United States (RIAA)	2× Platinum	2,000,000^{‡}
^{‡} Sales+streaming figures based on certification alone.
