= The Bitch Is Back =

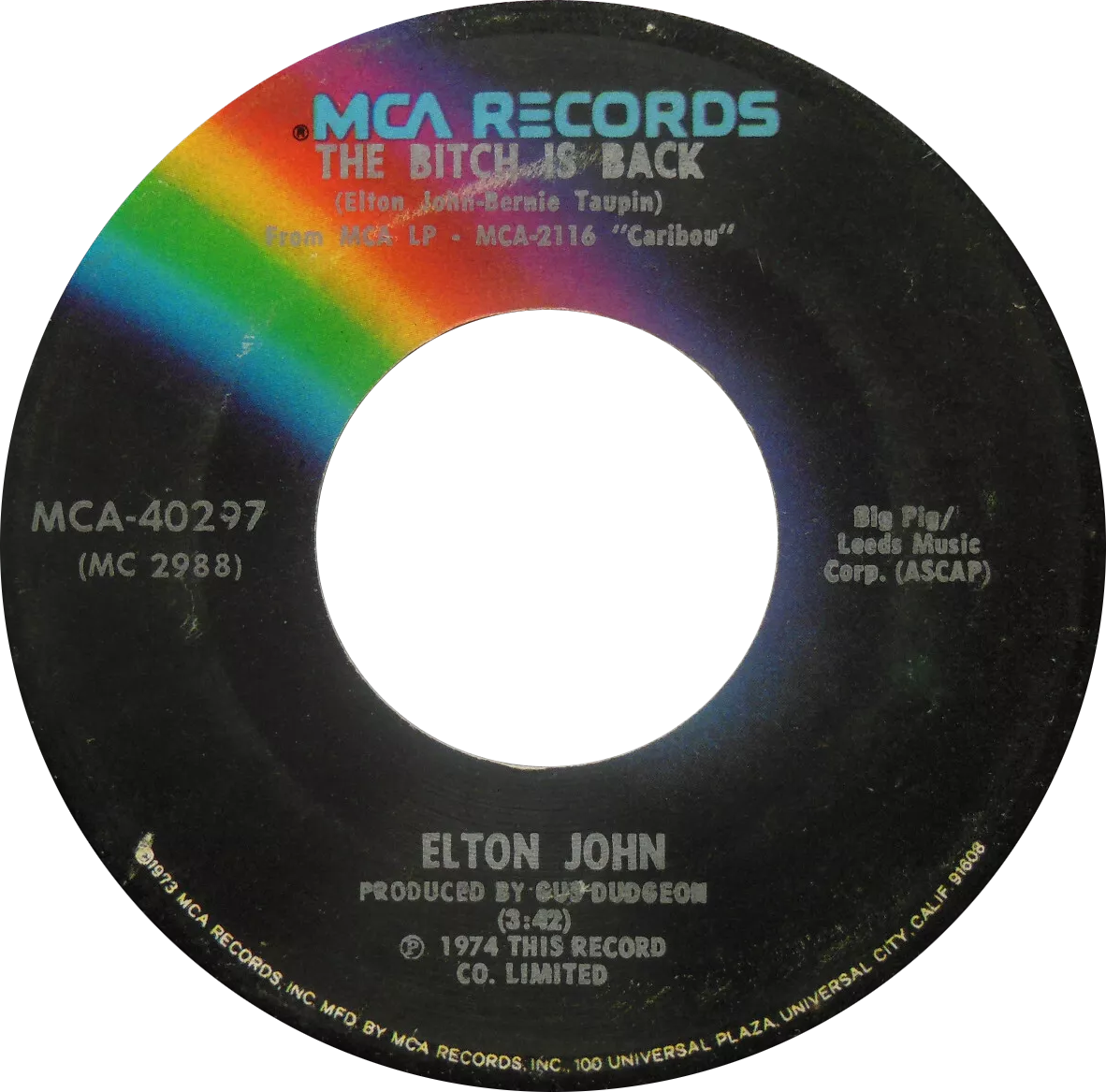
- One of side-A labels of the US single

Single by Elton John

from the album Caribou
- B-side: "Cold Highway"
- Released: 3 September 1974
- Recorded: January 1974
- Studio: Caribou Ranch (Nederland, Colorado)
- Genre: Hard rock; glam rock; power pop
- Length: 3:44
- Label: MCA; DJM; Rocket; Phonogram
- Songwriters: Elton John; Bernie Taupin
- Producer: Gus Dudgeon

Elton John singles chronology
"Don't Let the Sun Go Down on Me" (1974)	"The Bitch Is Back" (1974)	"Lucy in the Sky with Diamonds" (1974)

Licensed audio
- "The Bitch Is Back" (Remastered 1995) on YouTube

"The Bitch Is Back" is a song written by British musician Elton John and lyricist Bernie Taupin, and performed by John. It was the second single released from John's 1974 album Caribou, and reached number one in Canada (his sixth in that country), number four in the United States and number 15 in the United Kingdom.

The lyrics parody John's celebrity lifestyle. In the US, it was certified Gold on 13 September 1995 by the Recording Industry Association of America.

== Background ==
The idea to create the song was inspired not by John or Taupin directly, but rather by Taupin's wife at the time, Maxine Feibelman, who would say, "The bitch is back," when John was in a bad mood. Taupin then wrote the lyrics. Later, John would comment: "It is kind of my theme song." The song originally was written in A-flat major, but was later performed live a half step lower in the key of G major.

== Reception ==
Cash Box said that "Elton and the band are in rare form here and prove that rock comes as easily as the ballads do" and that "the hooks are incredible, the vocals are intense and the playing is right there." Record World called it a "rambunctious rouser" that "doesn't mince words."

== Controversy ==
Several radio stations in the United States and elsewhere refused to play the song because of the word "bitch". For example, in 1976, the program director of WPIX-FM in New York told Billboard, "We will play records that are borderline suggestive records such as 'Disco Lady' by Johnny [sic] Taylor but we will not play 'The Bitch Is Back' by Elton John. We won't play those types of records no matter how popular they get." John responded to the controversy, quipping "some radio stations in America are more puritanical than others."

== Personnel ==
- Elton John – piano, vocals
- Davey Johnstone – electric guitars
- Dee Murray – bass, phased Pignose bass
- Nigel Olsson – drums
- Tower of Power horn section – brass
  - Lenny Pickett – tenor sax (solo)
- Ray Cooper – tambourine
- Clydie King – backing vocals
- Sherlie Matthews – backing vocals
- Jessie Smith – backing vocals
- Dusty Springfield – backing vocals

== Chart performance ==
=== Weekly charts ===
Chart (1974)	Peak position
Australia	53
Canada RPM Top Singles	1
UK Singles Chart	15
Netherlands	26
US Billboard Hot 100	4
US Cash Box Top 100	5

=== Year-end charts ===
Chart (1974)	Rank
Canada	34

=== Certifications ===
Region	Certification	Certified units/sales
New Zealand (RMNZ)	Gold	15,000^{‡}
United Kingdom (BPI) Sales since 2007	Silver	200,000^{‡}
United States (RIAA)	Gold	500,000^{^}
^{^} Shipments figures based on certification alone.^{‡} Sales+streaming figures based on certification alone.

== Covers ==
The song was twice recorded by Tina Turner, once for her Rough album in 1978, and again for the John/Taupin tribute album Two Rooms in 1991. Turner also performed the song in her live show in the late 1970s, and with John at the 1995 VH1 Fashion and Music Awards and VH1 Divas Live '99. For her rendition Turner earned a Grammy nomination for Best Female Rock Performance.

Rihanna covered the song with Elton at the third annual Fashion Rocks Concert in 2006.

"Feud", the sixteenth episode of Glee's fourth season, uses "The Bitch Is Back" in a mash-up with Madonna's "Dress You Up", performed by Alex Newell and Blake Jenner.

Miley Cyrus covers the song for the 2018 album Restoration: Reimagining the Songs of Elton John and Bernie Taupin.

Taron Egerton covers the song for the 2019 Elton John biopic Rocketman. It is the first song featured in the film.

In Hocus Pocus 2 (2022), Bette Midler, Kathy Najimy and Sarah Jessica Parker perform the song in character as the Sanderson Sisters with the song rewritten as "The Witches Are Back".

== See also ==
- List of RPM number-one singles of 1974
