= Elton John videography =

Elton John video discography
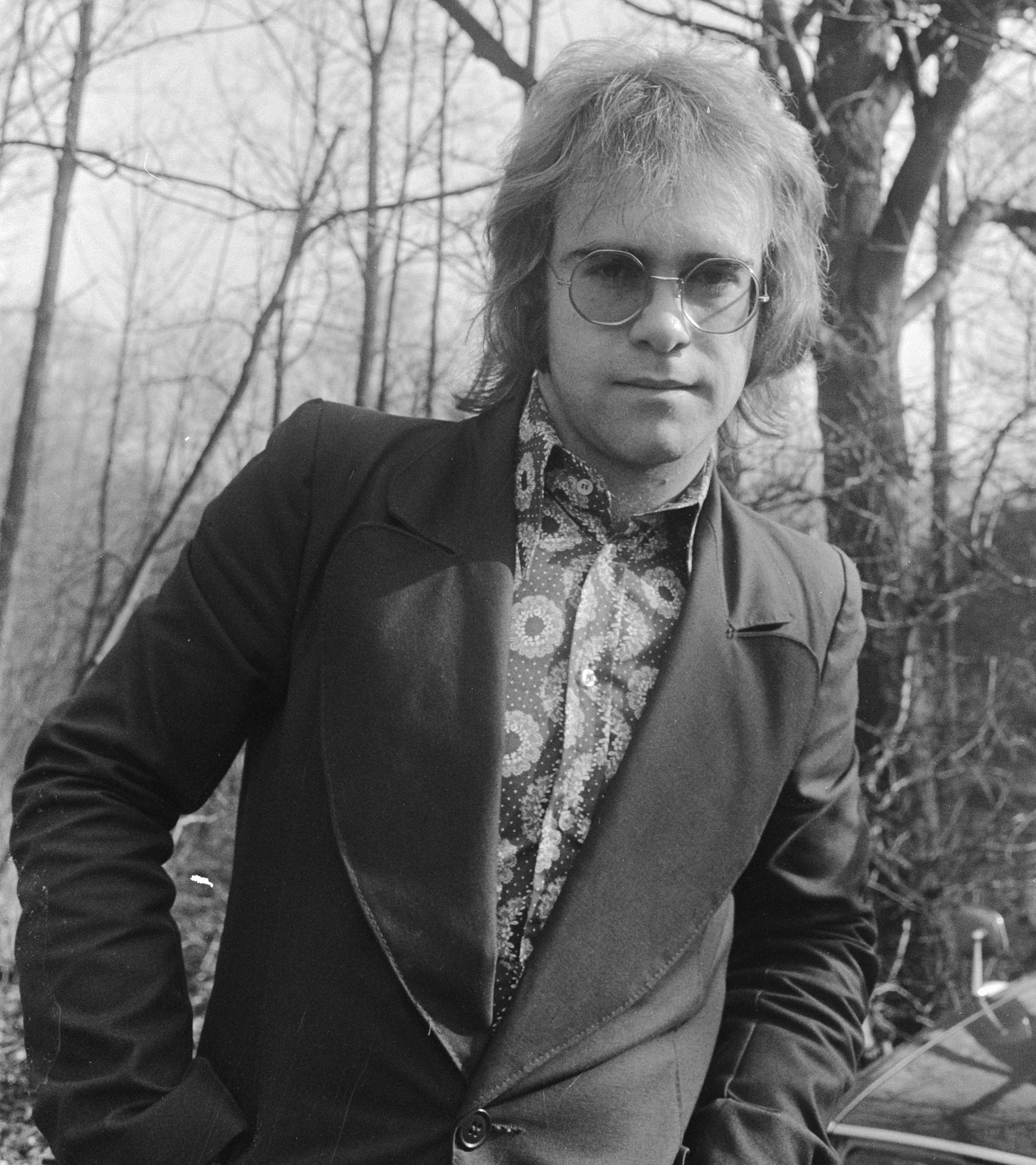
- John in 1971, during filming of his video for "Your Song"
- Video albums: 17
- Music videos: 183

The videography and filmography of British singer, songwriter and pianist Elton John consists of 183 music videos and 17 video albums.

Since 1970, John has continually released promotional music videos, beginning with "Your Song" and only sporadically releasing videos thereafter. It was not until Visions, a release that included music videos of every song from his 1981 album The Fox, as well as the rise of MTV, that he began to release videos more frequently.

John had usually appeared in his music videos, but after 2001, John began appearing less and less in his own videos, sometimes opting to have other actors such as Justin Timberlake ("This Train Don't Stop There Anymore") and Robert Downey Jr. ("I Want Love") lip-synch the lyrics.

== Music videos ==
=== 1970–1980 ===
Year	Title	Album	Music & Words	Art Direction	Video
1970	"Your Song"	Elton John	Elton John & Bernie Taupin	Rien van Wijk (TopPop)	TopPop official
1971	"Your Song" – Paparazzi Version	Elton John	Elton John & Bernie Taupin	Rien van Wijk (TopPop)	TopPop official
1971	"Take Me to the Pilot"	Elton John	Elton John & Bernie Taupin	Ric Birch (GTK)	
1971	"Sixty Years On" – Live Version	17-11-70 (UK) / 11-17-70 (US)	Elton John & Bernie Taupin	UNI USA	
1972	"Crocodile Rock"	Don't Shoot Me I'm Only the Piano Player	Elton John & Bernie Taupin		
1973	"Step into Christmas"	non-album single/ on 2017 compilation Diamonds	Elton John & Bernie Taupin		Elton John official
1976	"Sorry Seems to be the Hardest Word"	Blue Moves	Elton John & Bernie Taupin	Lindsey Clennell	Elton John official
1976	"Don't Go Breaking My Heart" (with Kiki Dee)	non-album single/ on 2017 compilation Diamonds	Elton John & Bernie Taupin	Mike Mansfield	Elton John official
1978	"Ego"	non-album single/ on 1990 box set To Be Continued...	Elton John & Bernie Taupin	Michael Lindsay-Hogg	Elton John official
1978	"Part-Time Love"	A Single Man	Elton John & Gary Osborne		
1978	"Song for Guy"	A Single Man	Elton John	Countdown Australia	Elton John official
1979	"Are You Ready for Love"	The Thom Bell Sessions	LeRoy Bell, Casey James & Thom Bell		
1980	"Les Aveux" (with France Gall)	non-album single/ on 2020 box set Elton: Jewel Box	Elton John & Michel Berger		
1980	"Donner pour Donner" (with France Gall)	B-side of "Les Aveux"/ on 2020 box set Elton: Jewel Box	Michel Berger & Bernie Taupin		
1980	"Little Jeannie"	21 at 33	Elton John & Gary Osborne	Plattenküche Germany WDR	
1980	"Sartorial Eloquence"	21 at 33	Elton John & Tom Robinson	Plattenküche Germany WDR	Elton John official
1980	"Chasing the Crown"	21 at 33	Elton John & Bernie Taupin	Plattenküche Germany WDR	

=== 1981–1982 Elton John: Visions (The Fox music videos) ===
Year	Title	Album	Music & Words	Art Direction	Video
1981	"Breaking Down Barriers"	The Fox	Elton John & Gary Osborne	Russell Mulcahy	Elton John official
1981	"Heart in the Right Place"	The Fox	Elton John & Gary Osborne	Russell Mulcahy	Elton John official
1981	"Just Like Belgium"	The Fox	Elton John & Bernie Taupin	Russell Mulcahy	Elton John official
1981	"Nobody Wins"	The Fox	Jean-Paul Dréau & Gary Osborne	Russell Mulcahy	Elton John official
1981	"Fascist Faces"	The Fox	Elton John & Bernie Taupin	Russell Mulcahy	Elton John official
1981	"Carla/Etude" "Fanfare"	The Fox	Elton John & James Newton Howard	Russell Mulcahy	Elton John official
1981	"Chloe"	The Fox	Elton John & Gary Osborne	Russell Mulcahy	Elton John official
1981	"Heels of the Wind"	The Fox	Elton John & Bernie Taupin	Russell Mulcahy	Elton John official
1981	"Elton's Song"	The Fox	Elton John & Tom Robinson	Russell Mulcahy	Elton John official
1981	"The Fox"	The Fox	Elton John & Bernie Taupin	Russell Mulcahy	Elton John official
1981	"J'veux D'la Tendresse"	Elton's French language version of "Nobody Wins"/ on 2020 box set Elton: Jewel Box	Jean-Paul Dréau	Russell Mulcahy	

==== Notes ====
- The album The Fox was released on 20 May 1981. However, Elton John: Visions became available only in 1982. The video collection was nominated for the 25th Annual Grammy Awards for Video of the Year (Elton, performer and Russell Mulcahy, director), it lost to Olivia Physical from Olivia Newton-John.

=== 1982–1989 ===
Year	Title	Album	Music & Words	Art Direction	Video
1982	"Blue Eyes"	Jump Up!	Elton John & Gary Osborne	Stephen Priest	Elton John official
1982	"Empty Garden (Hey Hey Johnny)"	Jump Up!	Elton John & Bernie Taupin	Stephen Priest	
1982	"Ball & Chain"	Jump Up!	Elton John & Gary Osborne	Stephen Priest	
1983	"I'm Still Standing"	Too Low for Zero	Elton John & Bernie Taupin	Russell Mulcahy	Elton John official
1983	"I Guess That's Why They Call It the Blues"	Too Low for Zero	Elton John, Davey Johnstone & Bernie Taupin	Russell Mulcahy	Elton John official
1983	"Kiss the Bride"	Too Low for Zero	Elton John & Bernie Taupin	Godley & Creme	Elton John official
1983	"Cold as Christmas (In the Middle of the Year)"	Too Low for Zero	Elton John & Bernie Taupin		Elton John official
1984	"Sad Songs (Say So Much)"	Breaking Hearts	Elton John & Bernie Taupin	Russell Mulcahy	Elton John official
1984	"Who Wears These Shoes?"	Breaking Hearts	Elton John & Bernie Taupin	Just Jaeckin	Elton John official
1984	"In Neon"	Breaking Hearts	Elton John & Bernie Taupin	Bernie Taupin	Elton John official
1984	"Passengers"	Breaking Hearts	Elton John, Davey Johnstone, Phineas Mkhize & Bernie Taupin	Simon Milne	Elton John official
1985	"Act of War" (with Millie Jackson)	non-album single/ on 1990 box set To Be Continued...	Elton John & Bernie Taupin	Simon Milne	
1985	"Wrap Her Up"	Ice on Fire	Elton John, Davey Johnstone, Fred Mandel, Charlie Morgan, Paul Westwood & Bernie Taupin	Russell Mulcahy	Elton John official
1985	"Nikita"	Ice on Fire	Elton John & Bernie Taupin	Ken Russell	Elton John official
1985	"Cry to Heaven"	Ice on Fire	Elton John & Bernie Taupin	Ken Russell	Elton John official
1985	"That's What Friends Are For" (with Dionne Warwick, Stevie Wonder & Gladys Knight)	Dionne Warwick Friends	Carole Bayer Sager & Burt Bacharach	John House	Dionne Warwick official
1985	"That's What Friends Are For" (with Dionne Warwick, Stevie Wonder & Gladys Knight) – Version 2	Dionne Warwick Friends	Carole Bayer Sager & Burt Bacharach	John House	
1986	"Heartache All Over the World"	Leather Jackets	Elton John & Bernie Taupin	Mike Brady	
1986	"Paris"	Leather Jackets	Elton John & Bernie Taupin	Mike Brady	
1986	"Slow Rivers" (with Cliff Richard)	Leather Jackets	Elton John & Bernie Taupin	Mike Brady	
1987	"Flames of Paradise" (with Jennifer Rush)	Jennifer Rush Heart over Mind	Bruce Roberts & Andy Goldmark	Nick Morris	Jennifer Rush official
1987	"Candle in the Wind" -Live Version with Marilyn Monroe images inserted	Live in Australia with the Melbourne Symphony Orchestra	Elton John & Bernie Taupin	Mark Fitzgerald	
1987	"Candle in the Wind" – Live Version without Monroe images	Live in Australia with the Melbourne Symphony Orchestra	Elton John & Bernie Taupin	Mark Fitzgerald	Elton John official
1987	"Your Song" – Live Version	Live in Australia with the Melbourne Symphony Orchestra	Elton John & Bernie Taupin	Mark Fitzgerald	Elton John official
1987	"Take Me to the Pilot" – Live Version	Live in Australia with the Melbourne Symphony Orchestra	Elton John & Bernie Taupin	Mark Fitzgerald	Elton John official
1988	"I Don't Wanna Go On with You Like That"	Reg Strikes Back	Elton John & Bernie Taupin	Russell Mulcahy	Elton John official
1988	"Town of Plenty"	Reg Strikes Back	Elton John & Bernie Taupin	Russell Mulcahy	
1988	"A Word in Spanish"	Reg Strikes Back	Elton John & Bernie Taupin	Russell Mulcahy	Elton John official
1989	"Healing Hands"	Sleeping with the Past	Elton John & Bernie Taupin	Russell Mulcahy	Elton John official
1989	"Sacrifice"	Sleeping with the Past	Elton John & Bernie Taupin	Alek Keshishian	Elton John official
1989	"Club at the End of the Street"	Sleeping with the Past	Elton John & Bernie Taupin	Derek Hayes	Elton John official
1989	"Whispers"	Sleeping with the Past	Elton John & Bernie Taupin		

=== 1990–1999 ===
Year	Title	Album	Music & Words	Art Direction	Video
1990	"You Gotta Love Someone"	The Very Best of Elton John (UK)/ To Be Continued... (US)	Elton John & Bernie Taupin	Andy Morahan	Elton John official
1990	"Easier to Walk Away"	The Very Best of Elton John (UK)/ To Be Continued... (US)	Elton John & Bernie Taupin		
1991	"Don't Let the Sun Go Down on Me" (with George Michael)	non-album single/ on 1993 album Duets	Elton John & Bernie Taupin	Andy Morahan	George Michael official
1992	"The One"	The One	Elton John & Bernie Taupin	Russell Mulcahy	Elton John official
1992	"Runaway Train" (with Eric Clapton)	The One	Elton John, Bernie Taupin & Olle Romo	Denise Thorne	Elton John official
1992	"The Last Song"	The One	Elton John & Bernie Taupin	Gus Van Sant	Elton John official
1992	"Simple Life"	The One	Elton John & Bernie Taupin	Russell Mulcahy	Elton John official
1993	"True Love" (with Kiki Dee)	Duets	Cole Porter	Vadim Jean	
1993	"Don't Go Breaking My Heart" (with RuPaul)	Duets	Elton John & Bernie Taupin	Fenton Bailey and Randy Barbato	Elton John official
1993	"Don't Go Breaking My Heart" (Moroder 12" Mix) (with RuPaul)	non-album mix	Elton John & Bernie Taupin	Fenton Bailey and Randy Barbato	
1993	"Ain't Nothing Like the Real Thing" (with Marcella Detroit)	Duets/ Marcella Detroit Jewel	Nickolas Ashford & Valerie Simpson	Rainer Thieding	London Records (Marcella Detroit) official
1994	"Can You Feel the Love Tonight"	The Lion King soundtrack	Elton John & Tim Rice	Matthew Amos	Elton John/ Disney official
1994	"Circle of Life"	The Lion King soundtrack	Elton John & Tim Rice	Richard Baskin	Elton John/ Disney official
1995	"Believe"	Made in England	Elton John & Bernie Taupin	Marcus Nispel	Elton John official
1995	"Made in England"	Made in England	Elton John & Bernie Taupin	Howard Greenhalgh	Elton John official
1995	"Blessed"	Made in England	Elton John & Bernie Taupin	David Vital-Durand and Raphaël Vital-Durand	Elton John official
1995	"Please"	Made in England	Elton John & Bernie Taupin	Howard Greenhalgh	
1996	"You Can Make History (Young Again)"	Love Songs	Elton John & Bernie Taupin	David Dobkin	Elton John official
1996	"Live Like Horses" (with Luciano Pavarotti)	non-album single/ on 2017 compilation Diamonds, Elton's solo version on The Big Picture	Elton John & Bernie Taupin	Federico Brugia	Elton John official
1997	"Something About the Way You Look Tonight"	The Big Picture	Elton John & Bernie Taupin	Tim Royes	Elton John official
1997	"Recover Your Soul"	The Big Picture	Elton John & Bernie Taupin	Marcus Nispel	Elton John official
1997	"Candle in the Wind 1997" – Lyric Video	non-album single	Elton John & Bernie Taupin	VH1	
1999	"Written in the Stars" (with LeAnn Rimes)	Elton John and Tim Rice's Aida	Elton John & Tim Rice	Harvey Bertram-Brown and Carolyn Corben	Elton John official
1999	"The Show Must Go On" (with Queen)	Queen Greatest Hits III			Queen official

=== 2000–2009 ===
Year	Title	Album	Music & Words	Art Direction	Video
2000	"Someday Out of the Blue"	The Road to El Dorado soundtrack	Elton John, Patrick Leonard & Tim Rice	Joseph Kahn and Bibo Bergeron	
2001	"I Want Love"	Songs from the West Coast	Elton John & Bernie Taupin	Sam Taylor-Wood	Elton John official
2001	"This Train Don't Stop There Anymore"	Songs from the West Coast	Elton John & Bernie Taupin	David LaChapelle	Elton John official
2001	"Original Sin"	Songs from the West Coast	Elton John & Bernie Taupin	David LaChapelle	Elton John official
2001	"Original Sin" (Junior's Earth Mix Edit) – Dan-O-Rama Video Remix	non-album remix single/ on 2002 Expanded Edition of Songs from the West Coast (UK), video remix featured as a bonus on the One Night Only – The Greatest Hits DVD	Elton John & Bernie Taupin	Dan-O-Rama	Dan-O-Rama official
2002	"Your Song" (with Alessandro Safina)	non-album single/ on 2002 compilation Greatest Hits 1970-2002 bonus disc and 2002 Expanded Edition of Songs from the West Coast (UK)	Elton John & Bernie Taupin	Tom Bird	Alessandro Safina official
2002	"Sorry Seems to be the Hardest Word" (with Blue)	Blue One Love	Elton John & Bernie Taupin	Max Giwa and Dania Pasquini	Blue official
2002	"Sorry Seems to be the Hardest Word" (Radio Edit) (with Blue)	Blue One Love	Elton John & Bernie Taupin	Max Giwa and Dania Pasquini	Blue official
2003	"Are You Ready for Love" ('79 Radio Edit)	Remixed EP/ original remix version on the 1979 EP The Thom Bell Sessions/ original 1977 recorded version on the 1989 album The Complete Thom Bell Sessions/ (Ashley Beedle's Love and Protection Mono Edit) version also on 2003's Remixed EP	LeRoy Bell, Casey James & Thom Bell	Kate Dawkins	Elton John official
2003	"The Heart of Every Girl"	Mona Lisa Smile soundtrack	Elton John & Bernie Taupin	Nigel Dick	
2004	"Answer in the Sky"	Peachtree Road	Elton John & Bernie Taupin	David LaChapelle	Elton John official
2004	"All That I'm Allowed (I'm Thankful)"	Peachtree Road	Elton John & Bernie Taupin	David LaChapelle	Elton John official
2004	"Turn the Lights Out When You Leave"	Peachtree Road	Elton John & Bernie Taupin	Sam Taylor-Wood	Elton John official
2005	"Electricity"	Billy Elliot the Musical Cast Recording bonus disc/ Peachtree Road Expanded Edition (2005)	Elton John & Lee Hall	Stephen Daldry	Elton John official
2005	"Electricity" – More Liam Version	Billy Elliot the Musical Cast Recording bonus disc/ Peachtree Road Expanded Edition (2005)	Elton John & Lee Hall	Stephen Daldry	Elton John official
2005	"Ghetto Gospel" (with 2Pac)	2Pac Loyal to the Game (samples Elton's "Indian Sunset" from his 1971 album Madman Across the Water)	Elton John, Tupac Shakur, Marshall Mathers & Bernie Taupin	Nzingha Stewart	2Pac official
2006	"Tinderbox"	The Captain & the Kid	Elton John & Bernie Taupin	Julian Gibbs and Julian House	Elton John official
2008	"Joseph, Better You than Me" (with The Killers & Neil Tennant)	non-album single/ on 2011 album The Killers (Red) Christmas EP	Elton John, Brandon Flowers & Neil Tennant	Daniel Drysdale and Tyler Trautman	The Killers Music official
2009	"Tiny Dancer (Hold Me Closer)" (with Ironik & Chipmunk)	Ironik No Point in Wasting Tears	Elton John, Ironik & Bernie Taupin	Max & Dania	DJ Ironik official

=== 2010–2019 ===
Year	Title	Album	Music & Words	Art Direction	Video
2010	"If It Wasn't for Bad" (with Leon Russell)	The Union	Leon Russell	Paul McKeown and One Hand Clapping	Elton John official
2012	"Sad" (vs Pnau)	Good Morning to the Night	Elton John, Thom Bell, Pnau & Bernie Taupin	Julian House	Elton John official
2013	"Home Again"	The Diving Board	Elton John & Bernie Taupin	Brent Bonacorso	Elton John official
2013	"Home Again" – Lyric Video	The Diving Board	Elton John & Bernie Taupin	Elton John's YouTube Official Channel	Elton John official
2013	"Oceans Away" – Lyric Video	The Diving Board	Elton John & Bernie Taupin	Elton John's YouTube Official Channel	Elton John official
2013	"Face To Face" (with Gary Barlow)	Gary Barlow Since I Saw You Last	Gary Barlow & John Shanks	Steve Power	Gary Barlow official
2014	"Save Rock and Roll" (with Fall Out Boy)	Fall Out Boy Save Rock and Roll	Fall Out Boy	Adam Donald and Andrew Zaeh	Fall Out Boy official
2014	"I Wish We Were Leaving" (with Bright Light Bright Light)	Bright Light Bright Light Life Is Easy	Rod Thomas	Johnny Lochland	brightlight×2 official
2014	"Harmony"	in recognition and release of Goodbye Yellow Brick Road 40th Anniversary	Elton John & Bernie Taupin	Tam Johnstone	
2015	"Looking Up"	Wonderful Crazy Night	Elton John & Bernie Taupin	Joe Marshall	Elton John official
2016	"Blue Wonderful"	Wonderful Crazy Night	Elton John & Bernie Taupin	Thibaut Duverneix	Elton John official
2016	"In the Name of You"	Wonderful Crazy Night	Elton John & Bernie Taupin	Rob Chandler	Elton John official
2016	"A Good Heart"	Wonderful Crazy Night	Elton John & Bernie Taupin	Daniel Kragh-Jacobsen	Elton John official
2016	"All in the Name" (with Bright Light Bright Light)	Bright Light Bright Light Choreography	Rod Thomas	Rod Thomas & Santiago Felipe	brightlight×2 official
2016	"Symmetry of Two Hearts" (with Bright Light Bright Light)	Bright Light Bright Light Choreography	Rod Thomas	Rod Thomas & Santiago Felipe	brightlight×2 official
2017	"Running Back To You" (with Bright Light Bright Light)	Bright Light Bright Light Choreography	Rod Thomas & Ian Masterson	Rod Thomas & Santiago Felipe	brightlight×2 official
2017	"Bennie and the Jets"	Goodbye Yellow Brick Road, music video contest Elton John: The Cut in partnership with YouTube was won by the directors	Elton John & Bernie Taupin	Jack Whiteley & Laura Brownhill	Elton John official
2017	"Tiny Dancer"	Madman Across The Water, music video contest Elton John: The Cut in partnership with YouTube was won by the director	Elton John & Bernie Taupin	Max Weiland	Elton John official
2017	"Rocket Man (I Think It's Going to Be a Long, Long Time)"	Honky Château, music video contest Elton John: The Cut in partnership with YouTube was won by the directors	Elton John & Bernie Taupin	Majid Adin and Stephen McNally	Elton John official
2019	"(I'm Gonna) Love Me Again" (with Taron Egerton)	Rocketman Soundtrack	Elton John & Bernie Taupin	Kii Arens	Elton John official
2019	"Never Too Late" – Lyric Video	The Lion King 2019 soundtrack	Elton John & Tim Rice	Jon Favreau	Disney official

=== 2020–2025 ===
Year	Title	Album	Music & Words	Art Direction	Video
2020	"(I'm Gonna) Love Me Again" (Purple Disco Machine Remix) (with Taron Egerton)	non-album remix single	Elton John & Bernie Taupin	Kii Arens	Elton John official
2020	"Ordinary Man" (with Ozzy Osbourne)	Ozzy Osbourne Ordinary Man	Ozzy Osbourne, Elton John, Chad Smith, Duff McKagan, William Walsh & Andrew Wotman	Stephen Lee Carr	Ozzy Osbourne official
2020	"Learn To Fly" (with Surfaces) – Lyric Video	non-album single available through Surfaces website, The Lockdown Sessions	Forrest Frank & Colin Padalecki	Studio Showoff	Surfaces Music official
2020	"Learn To Fly" (with Surfaces)	non-album single available through Surfaces website, The Lockdown Sessions	Forrest Frank & Colin Padalecki	Studio Showoff	Surfaces Music official
2020	"Learn To Fly" (Extended Version) (with Surfaces) – Extended Video	B-side to non-album single available through Surfaces website	Forrest Frank & Colin Padalecki	Studio Showoff	Surfaces Music official
2020	"Sing Me No Sad Songs" (Band Demo) – Lyric Video	Elton: Jewel Box	Elton John & Bernie Taupin	Elton John's YouTube Official Channel	Elton John official
2020	"Regimental Sgt. Zippo" (Band Version)	Elton: Jewel Box	Elton John & Bernie Taupin	Elton John's YouTube Official Channel	Elton John official
2020	"Watching the Planes Go By" (Band Version) – Lyric Video	Elton: Jewel Box	Elton John & Bernie Taupin	Elton John's YouTube Official Channel	Elton John official
2020	"I Can't Go On Living Without You" (Arranged Band Version) – Lyric Video	Elton: Jewel Box	Elton John & Bernie Taupin	Elton John's YouTube Official Channel	Elton John official
2020	"Here's to the Next Time" (Piano/ Tambourine Demo) – Lyric Video	Elton: Jewel Box	Elton John	Elton John's YouTube Official Channel	Elton John official
2020	"The Pink Phantom" (with Gorillaz & 6lack)	Gorillaz Song Machine, Season One: Strange Timez / The Lockdown Sessions	Damon Albarn, Remi Kabaka Jr. & 6lack	Jamie Hewlett	Gorillaz official
2021	"Baby I Miss You" (Band Demo) – Lyric Video	Elton: Jewel Box	Elton John & Bernie Taupin	Elton John's YouTube Official Channel	Elton John official
2021	"The Flowers Will Never Die" (Piano Demo) – Lyric Video	Elton: Jewel Box	Elton John & Bernie Taupin	Elton John's YouTube Official Channel	Elton John official
2021	"Scarecrow" (Piano/ Tambourine Demo) – Lyric Video	Elton: Jewel Box	Elton John & Bernie Taupin	Elton John's YouTube Official Channel	Elton John official
2021	"Chosen Family" (with Rina Sawayama) – Performance Lyric Video	The Lockdown Sessions	Rina Sawayama & Danny L Harle		Rina Sawayama official
2021	"Nothing Else Matters" (with Miley Cyrus, WATT, Yo-Yo Ma, Robert Trujillo & Chad Smith)	The Lockdown Sessions	James Hetfield & Lars Ulrich	Hidden Road	Miley Cyrus official
2021	"Cold Heart" (Pnau Remix) (with Dua Lipa)	The Lockdown Sessions	Elton John, Bernie Taupin & Pnau	Raman Djafari	Elton John official
2021	"Cold Heart" (The Blessed Madonna Remix) (with Dua Lipa) – Visualiser	non-album single remix	Elton John, Bernie Taupin & Pnau	Raman Djafari	Elton John official
2021	"Cold Heart" (PS1 Remix) (with Dua Lipa) – Visualiser	non-album single remix	Elton John, Bernie Taupin & Pnau	James Stevens	Elton John official
2021	"Cold Heart" (Claptone Remix) (with Dua Lipa) – Visualiser	non-album single remix	Elton John, Bernie Taupin & Pnau	James Stevens	Elton John official
2021	"Finish Line" (with Stevie Wonder) – Lyric Video	The Lockdown Sessions	Elton John, Roman Campolo, Ali Tamposi & Andrew Wotman	Jared Shelton	Elton John official
2021	"Merry Christmas" (with Ed Sheeran)	non-album single, later released to streaming services on The Lockdown Sessions	Elton John & Ed Sheeran	Jason Koenig	Ed Sheeran official
2021	"Merry Christmas" (with Ed Sheeran) – Lyric Video	non-album single, later released to streaming services on The Lockdown Sessions	Elton John & Ed Sheeran	351 Studio	Ed Sheeran official
2021	"Sausage Rolls for Everyone" (with Ed Sheeran & LadBaby)	non-album single	Mark Hoyle, Roxanne Hoyle, Elton John, Ed Sheeran & Steve McCutcheon		LadBaby official
2022	"Picture" (with Eddie Vedder) – Lyric Video	Eddie Vedder Earthling	Elton John, Eddie Vedder & Andrew Wotman	Sabrina Nichols	Eddie Vedder official
2022	"Finish Line" (with Stevie Wonder)	The Lockdown Sessions	Elton John, Roman Campolo, Ali Tamposi & Andrew Wotman	Zack Sekuler	Elton John official
2022	"Tiny Dancer" (Piano Demo) - Lyric Video	Madman Across the Water Anniversary Edition	Elton John & Bernie Taupin	Elton John's YouTube Official Channel	Elton John official
2022	"Madman Across the Water" (Original Version featuring Mick Ronson) – Lyric Video	Madman Across the Water Anniversary Edition	Elton John & Bernie Taupin	Elton John's YouTube Official Channel	Elton John official
2022	"Hold Me Closer" (with Britney Spears) – Lyric Video	non-album single, later released to streaming services on The Lockdown Sessions	Elton John, Bernie Taupin, Andrew Wotman & Henry Walter	Elton John's YouTube Official Channel	Elton John official
2022	"Hold Me Closer" (with Britney Spears)	non-album single, later released to streaming services on The Lockdown Sessions	Elton John, Bernie Taupin, Andrew Wotman & Henry Walter	Tanu Muino	Elton John official
2022	"Hold Me Closer" (Joel Corry Remix) (with Britney Spears) – Visualiser	non-album single remix	Elton John, Bernie Taupin, Andrew Wotman & Henry Walter	Klub Artefakt	Elton John official
2022	"Hold Me Closer" (Purple Disco Machine Remix) (with Britney Spears) – Visualiser	non-album single remix	Elton John, Bernie Taupin, Andrew Wotman & Henry Walter	Klub Artefakt	Elton John official
2022	"Hold Me Closer" (Pink Panda Remix) (with Britney Spears) – Visualiser	non-album single remix	Elton John, Bernie Taupin, Andrew Wotman & Henry Walter	Klub Artefakt	Elton John official
2022	"Hold Me Closer" (Joel Corry Remix) (with Britney Spears)	non-album single remix	Elton John, Bernie Taupin, Andrew Wotman & Henry Walter	Rebeka B Creative	Elton John official
2022	"Hold Me Closer" (Acoustic) (with Britney Spears)	non-album single remix	Elton John, Bernie Taupin, Andrew Wotman & Henry Walter	Tristan Nash	Elton John official
2023	"Guiding Light (Anniversary Edition)" (with Foy Vance, Ed Sheeran & Keith Urban)	non-album single	Foy Vance	Gus Black	Foy Vance official
2024	"I'm Not Gonna Miss You" (with Glen Campbell) – Lyric Video	Glen Campbell Duets: Ghost on the Canvas Sessions	Glen Campbell & Julian Raymond		Glen Campbell official
2024	"Never Too Late" (from the film "Elton John: Never Too Late") (with Brandi Carlile)	plays during the end credits of the documentary film Elton John: Never Too Late/ Who Believes in Angels?	Elton John, Bernie Taupin, Brandi Carlile & Andrew Watt	R.J. Cutler & David Furnish	Elton John official
2024	"Never Too Late" (Acoustic) (with Brandi Carlile) - Lyric Video	acoustic version of the original from the documentary film Elton John: Never Too Late	Elton John, Bernie Taupin, Brandi Carlile & Andrew Watt	R.J. Cutler & David Furnish	Elton John official
2024	"Step into Christmas" (2024 Music Video)	non-album single; on 2017 compilation Diamonds	Elton John & Bernie Taupin	Dan French	Elton John official
2024	"Whatever Gets You Thru the Night" (with John Lennon) - Lyric Video	live version at Madison Square Garden on Nov. 28, 1974 from Elton John Here and There 2 CD deluxe edition album (1995)/ plays during Elton John: Never Too Late documentary	John Lennon	R.J. Cutler & David Furnish	Elton John official
2025	"Who Believes in Angels?" (with Brandi Carlile) - Lyric Video	Who Believes in Angels?	Elton John, Bernie Taupin, Brandi Carlile & Andrew Watt	David LaChapelle	Elton John official
2025	"Who Believes in Angels?" (with Brandi Carlile)	Who Believes in Angels?	Elton John, Bernie Taupin, Brandi Carlile & Andrew Watt	David LaChapelle	Elton John official
2025	"Swing for the Fences" (with Brandi Carlile) - Lyric Video	Who Believes in Angels?	Elton John, Bernie Taupin, Brandi Carlile & Andrew Watt		Elton John official
2025	"Swing for the Fences" (with Brandi Carlile)	Who Believes in Angels?	Elton John, Bernie Taupin, Brandi Carlile & Andrew Watt	Xavier Dolan	Elton John official

=== Music videos, by others, involving *Elton John ===
Year	Title	Album	Music & Words	Art Direction	Video
1988	"When We Was Fab" (by George Harrison) *Elton makes a very brief cameo in the video, dropping a coin into Harrison's cup.	George Harrison Cloud Nine	George Harrison & Jeff Lynne	Godley & Creme	George Harrison official
1988	"The Rumour" (by Olivia Newton-John) *Elton, along with Bernie, wrote the song and provided piano and backing vocals.	Olivia Newton-John The Rumour	Elton John & Bernie Taupin		Olivia Newton- John official
1996	"Live Like Horses" (by Elton John and Luciano Pavarotti) *Elton and Pavarotti are the subjects in this piece shot for GMTV in 1996.	non-album single, on 2017 compilation Diamonds	Elton John & Bernie Taupin	Peter Demetris	Peter Demetris official
1997	"Perfect Day" (by Various Artists) *Elton provides vocals and cameos in the video, along with Lou Reed, David Bowie, Heather Small and several others.	non-album single, song was later released to raise money for the BBC charity Children in Need, #1 in the UK	Lou Reed	BBC TV	Heather Small-The Voice of M People official
2005	"Your Song" (by Patti LaBelle and Elton John) *Elton and LaBelle provide behind-the-scenes footage, in a montage, of their recording of the song for TV One.	Patti LaBelle Classic Moments	Elton John & Bernie Taupin	TV One	
2005	"Tears in Heaven" (by various artists) *Elton provides vocals and cameos in the video, along with Ozzy Osbourne, Rod Stewart, P!nk and several others.	non-album single, used to raise funds and awareness for relief of natural disasters	Eric Clapton & Will Jennings	Marcus Raboy	
2014	"God Only Knows" (by various artists) *Elton provides vocals and cameos in the video, along with Brian Wilson, Stevie Wonder, Lorde and several others.	non-album single, The Beach Boys classic used to launch BBC Music	Brian Wilson & Tony Asher	Jonas Euvremer & François Rousselet	BBC Music official
2015	"Oceans Away" (by Elton John) *Elton has provided his and Bernie's song to this seemingly Hollywood-produced video short?	The Diving Board	Elton John & Bernie Taupin	Toby Wosskow and Colin Bates	Toby & Colin official
2017	"Two Fingers of Whiskey" (by Elton John and Jack White) In this clip from the PBS/BBC documentary, The American Epic Sessions, *Elton, along with White, are performing one of the songs written for the film.	Music from The American Epic Sessions: Original Motion Picture Soundtrack	Elton John & Bernie Taupin	Bernard MacMahon	BBC Music official
2020	"Personal Shopper" (by Steven Wilson) *Elton makes an offscreen cameo by reading a shopping list at a break in the song.	Steven Wilson The Future Bites	Steven Wilson	Lucrecia Taormina	Steven Wilson official
2020	"Lose Each Other" (by Teyana Taylor). *Elton is featured in the video.	Teyana Taylor The Album	Teyana Taylor, Ryan Ridgley, Bibi Bourelly, Mike Dean, Uforo Ebong & Raymond Komba	Teyana Taylor	Teyana Taylor official

== David LaChapelle's the Red Piano Music Videos ==
Videos directed by photographer David LaChapelle for Elton John's the Red Piano stage at the Colosseum Caesar's Palace in Las Vegas.

Year	Title	Original year	Original album	Music & Words	Video
2004	"Rocket Man (I Think It's Going To Be A Long, Long Time)"	1972	Honky Château	Elton John & Bernie Taupin	
2004	"Daniel"	1973	Don't Shoot Me I'm Only the Piano Player	Elton John & Bernie Taupin	
2004	"Candle in the Wind"	1973	Goodbye Yellow Brick Road	Elton John & Bernie Taupin	
2004	"Saturday Night's Alright for Fighting"	1973	Goodbye Yellow Brick Road	Elton John & Bernie Taupin	
2004	"The Bitch Is Back"	1974	Caribou	Elton John & Bernie Taupin	
2004	"Don't Let the Sun Go Down on Me"	1974	Caribou	Elton John & Bernie Taupin	
2004	"Philadelphia Freedom"	1975	Non-album single	Elton John & Bernie Taupin	
2004	"Pinball Wizard"	1975	Non-album single	Pete Townshend	
2004	"I'm Still Standing"	1983	Too Low For Zero	Elton John & Bernie Taupin	
2004	"I Guess That's Why They Call It The Blues"	1983	Too Low For Zero	Elton John, Davey Johnstone & Bernie Taupin	
2004	"Believe"	1995	Made in England	Elton John & Bernie Taupin	
2006	"Goodbye Yellow Brick Road"	1973	Goodbye Yellow Brick Road	Elton John & Bernie Taupin	
2006	"Someone Saved My Life Tonight"	1975	Captain Fantastic and the Brown Dirt Cowboy	Elton John & Bernie Taupin	

== Video albums ==
List of video albums, with selected details
Title	Details
To Russia with Elton	Released: 1979; Formats: VHS, LD, DVD (2004)
Live in Central Park	Released: 1980; Formats: VHS, LD
Visions	Released: 1982; Formats: VHS, LD
The Videosingles	Released: 1983; Format: VHS
The Night Time Concert	Released: 1984; Formats: VHS, LD
The Breaking Hearts Tour	Released: 1985; Formats: VHS, LD
Live in Australia	Released: 6 July 1987; Formats: VHS, LD
The Very Best of Elton John	Released: 1 October 1990; Formats: VHS, LD, DVD (2000)
Live in Barcelona	Released: 1992; Formats: VHS, LD, DVD (2000)
The Last Song Video Single	Released: 1993; Format: VHS
Love Songs	Released: 6 November 1996; Formats: VHS, DVD (2000)
An Audience with Elton John	Released: 1997; Format: VHS
One Night Only: The Greatest Hits Live at Madison Square Garden	Released: 2000; Format: DVD
Dream Ticket	Released: 2004; Format: DVD
Elton 60 – Live at Madison Square Garden	Released: 2 October 2007; Formats: DVD, Blu-ray
The Red Piano	Released: 2008; Formats: DVD, Blu-ray
The Million Dollar Piano	Released: 1 July 2014; Formats: DVD, Blu-ray

== Filmography ==
- Born to Boogie, US (1972) as himself with Marc Bolan and Ringo Starr
- Tommy, UK (1975) as Pinball Wizard
- The Muppet Show (1978) (season 2) guest appearance as himself
- Totally Minnie (1988) as himself
- Spice World, UK (1997) as himself
- The Nanny (1997) as himself
- Elton John: Tantrums & Tiaras (1997) autobiography as himself
- South Park (1998) (season 2) guest appearance as himself
- The Simpsons (1999) (season 10) guest appearance as himself
- The Road to El Dorado (2000) as the Narrator
- Bob the Builder (2001) special "A Christmas to Remember" as himself
- Ally McBeal (2001) episode "I Want Love" as himself
- The Country Bears, US (2002) as himself
- Will & Grace, (2002) as himself
- Elton John: Me, Myself & I (2007) autobiography as himself
- Brüno (2009) as himself
- Nashville (2016) (season 4) guest appearance as himself
- The American Epic Sessions (2017) as himself
- Kingsman: The Golden Circle (2017) as himself
- CBeebies Bedtime Stories (2020) as himself
- Demi Lovato: Dancing with the Devil (2021) as himself
- Brian Wilson: Long Promised Road (2021) as himself
- RuPaul's Drag Race: UK vs. the World (2022) (Series 1) as himself
- If These Walls Could Sing (2022) as himself
- Elton John: Never Too Late (2024) as himself
- Spinal Tap II: The End Continues (2025) as himself
