= List of awards and nominations received by Elton John =

Sir Elton John awards and nominations
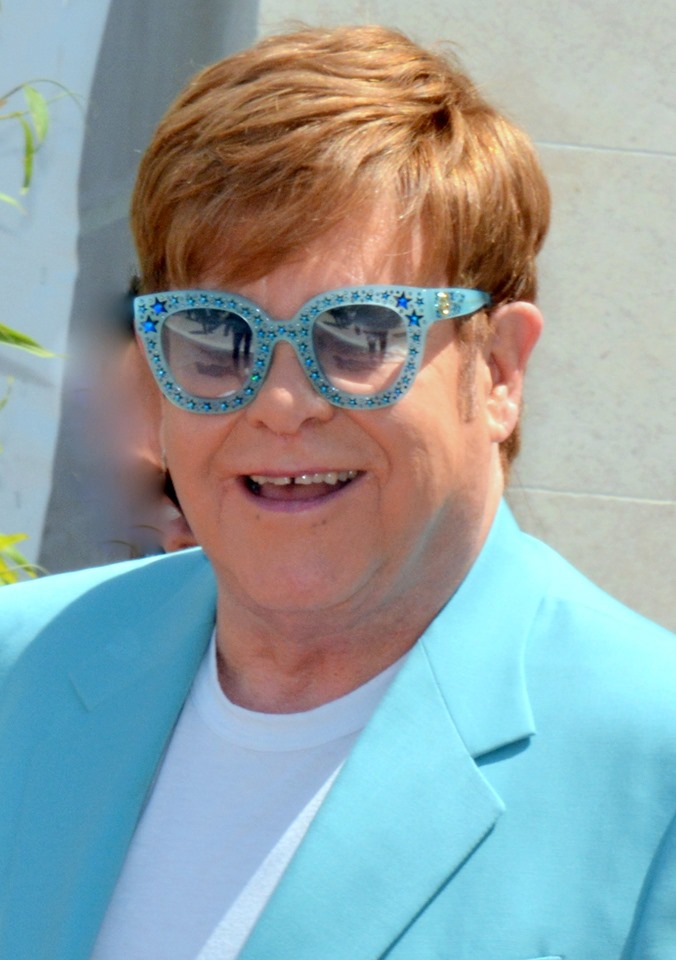
- John at the Cannes Film Festival in 2019
Awards and nominations
Award	Wins	Nominations
Academy Awards	2	5
Emmy Awards	1	1
Golden Globes	2	4
Grammy Awards	6	37
Tony Awards	1	4

Totals (Note: Certain award groups do not simply award one winner. They acknowledge several different recipients, have runners-up, and have third place. Since this is a specific recognition and is different from losing an award, runner-up mentions are considered wins in this award tally. For simplification and to avoid errors, each award in this list has been presumed to have had a prior nomination.)
- Wins: 67
- Nominations: 124

Sir Elton John is a British singer, songwriter and pianist. He is one of the few performers to have won the four major American entertainment awards (EGOT), having won two Academy Awards, an Emmy Award, six Grammy Awards, and a Tony Award. He has also received two Golden Globe Awards and an Laurence Olivier Award. In 2004, Rolling Stone ranked him 49th on its list of 100 influential musicians of the rock and roll era. He was inducted into the Songwriters Hall of Fame in 1992 and the Rock and Roll Hall of Fame in 1994, and received the Kennedy Center Honor in 2004. He was knighted by Queen Elizabeth II in 1998, appointed a member of the Order of the Companions of Honour by King Charles III (then Prince of Wales) in 2020 and made a Knight of the Legion of Honor by French President Emmanuel Macron.

John has sold over 300 million records worldwide during his six-decade career in music, making him one of the best-selling artists of all time. He has more than fifty Top 40 hits in the UK Singles Chart and US Billboard Hot 100, including nine number ones in the UK and US, as well as seven consecutive number-one albums in the US. His 1973 double album Goodbye Yellow Brick Road and his 1974 Greatest Hits compilation album are among the best-selling albums worldwide. His tribute single "Candle in the Wind 1997", a rewritten version of his 1974 single in dedication to Princess Diana, sold over 33 million copies worldwide and is the best-selling chart single of all time. In 2019, John was ranked by Billboard as the top solo artist in US chart history (third overall), and the top Adult Contemporary Artist of all time. In 2021, John became the first solo artist with UK Top 10 singles across six decades.

John is also known for his work on the stage and film; he wrote the music and lyrics for the Broadway musicals The Lion King (1998), Aida (2000), and Billy Elliot the Musical (2009), and also wrote the songs for the Disney animated film The Lion King (1994). Over his six decade career in music, John has received 35 Grammy Award nominations receiving five wins and a Grammy Legend Award in 1999. He also received the three Tony Award nominations winning for Best Original Score for his work on Broadway for The Lion King in 1998, Aida in 2000, and Billy Elliot the Musical in 2009. For his work on film he received four Academy Award nominations for Best Original Song for "Can You Feel the Love Tonight" from The Lion King (1994), and "I'm Gonna Love Me Again" for Rocketman (2019). John won an Emmy award in 2024 for his program Elton John Live: Farewell from Dodger Stadium, completing the set of television (Emmy), music (Grammy), movie (Oscar) and stage (Tony) awards known as an EGOT.

== Major associations ==
=== Academy Awards ===
Year	Category	Nominated work	Result	Ref.
1994	Best Original Song	"Can You Feel the Love Tonight", The Lion King	Won	
1994	Best Original Song	"Circle of Life", The Lion King	Nominated	
1994	Best Original Song	"Hakuna Matata", The Lion King	Nominated	
2019	Best Original Song	"(I'm Gonna) Love Me Again", Rocketman	Won	
2024	Best Original Song	"Never Too Late", Elton John: Never Too Late	Nominated	

=== Emmy Awards ===
Primetime Emmy Awards
Year	Category	Nominated work	Result	Ref.
2023	Outstanding Variety Special (Live)	Elton John: Farewell from Dodger Stadium	Won	

=== Golden Globe Awards ===
Year	Category	Nominated work	Result	Ref.
1994	Best Original Song	"Can You Feel the Love Tonight" (Note: Tim Rice) (from The Lion King)	Won	
2003	Best Original Song	"The Heart of Every Girl" (from Mona Lisa Smile)	Nominated	
2011	Best Original Song	"Hello, Hello" (Note: Lady Gaga) (from Gnomeo & Juliet)	Nominated	
2019	Best Original Song	"I'm Gonna Love Me Again" (Note: Bernie Taupin) (from Rocketman)	Won	

=== Grammy Awards ===
Year	Category	Nominated work	Result	Ref.
1971	Best New Artist	Himself	Nominated	
1971	Album of the Year	Elton John	Nominated	
1971	Best Contemporary Male Vocalist	Elton John	Nominated	
1972	Best Original Score Written for a Motion Picture	"Friends" Original Soundtrack Recording	Nominated	
1974	Best Male Pop Vocal Performance	"Daniel"	Nominated	
1975	Best Male Pop Vocal Performance	"Don't Let the Sun Go Down on Me"	Nominated	
1975	Record of the Year	"Don't Let the Sun Go Down on Me"	Nominated	
1975	Album of the Year	Caribou	Nominated	
1976	Album of the Year	Captain Fantastic and the Brown Dirt Cowboy	Nominated	
1976	Best Male Pop Vocal Performance	Captain Fantastic and the Brown Dirt Cowboy	Nominated	
1977	Best Pop Performance by a Duo or Group	"Don't Go Breaking My Heart" with Kiki Dee	Nominated	
1980	Best R&B Vocal Performance – Male	"Mama Can't Buy You Love"	Nominated	
1983	Best Male Pop Vocal Performance	"Blue Eyes"	Nominated	
1983	Video of the Year	Elton John: Visions	Nominated	
1985	Best Male Rock Vocal Performance	"Restless"	Nominated	
1987	Record of the Year	"That's What Friends Are For"	Nominated	
1987	Best Pop Performance by a Duo or Group with Vocal	"That's What Friends Are For"	Won	
1988	Best Male Pop Vocal Performance	"Candle in the Wind" (live)	Nominated	
1992	Best Instrumental Composition	"Basque"	Won	
1993	Best Pop Performance by a Duo or Group with Vocal	"Don't Let the Sun Go Down on Me" with George Michael	Nominated	
1993	Best Male Pop Vocal Performance	"The One"	Nominated	
1995	Song of the Year	"Can You Feel the Love Tonight"	Nominated	
1995	Best Male Pop Vocal Performance	"Can You Feel the Love Tonight"	Won	
1995	Best Song Written for Visual Media	"Can You Feel the Love Tonight"	Nominated	
1995	Song of the Year	"Circle of Life"	Nominated	
1995	Best Song Written for Visual Media	"Circle of Life"	Nominated	
1996	Best Male Pop Vocal Performance	"Believe"	Nominated	
1998	Best Male Pop Vocal Performance	"Candle in the Wind 1997"	Won	
1999	Grammy Legend Award	—N/a	Honored	
2001	Best Musical Show Album	Elton John & Tim Rice's Aida	Won	
2002	Best Pop Vocal Album	Songs from the West Coast	Nominated	
2002	Best Male Pop Vocal Performance	"I Want Love"	Nominated	
2003	Best Male Pop Vocal Performance	"Original Sin"	Nominated	
2005	Best Pop Collaboration with Vocals	"Sorry Seems to Be the Hardest Word" with Ray Charles	Nominated	
2011	Best Pop Collaboration with Vocals	"If It Wasn't for Bad" with Leon Russell	Nominated	
2022	Album of the Year	Montero by Lil Nas X (as a featured artist)	Nominated	
2026	Best Song Written For Visual Media	"Never Too Late" (from Elton John: Never Too Late)	Nominated	
2026	Best Traditional Pop Vocal Album	Who Believes in Angels? (with Brandi Carlile)	Nominated	

=== Laurence Olivier Awards ===
Year	Category	Nominated work	Result	Ref.
2000	Best New Musical	The Lion King	Nominated	
2006	Best New Musical	Billy Elliot	Won	

=== Tony Awards ===
Year	Category	Nominated work	Result	Ref.
1998	Best Original Score	The Lion King	Nominated	
2000	Best Original Score	Aida	Won	
2009	Best Original Score	Billy Elliot the Musical	Nominated	
2010	Best Play	Next Fall	Nominated	

== Miscellaneous awards ==
Organizations	Year	Category	Work	Result	Ref.
ASCAP Pop Music Awards	1987	Most Performed Songs	"Nikita"	Won	
ASCAP Pop Music Awards	1989	Most Performed Songs	"I Don't Wanna Go on with You Like That"	Won	
ASCAP Pop Music Awards	1991	Most Performed Songs	"Sacrifice"	Won	
ASCAP Pop Music Awards	1994	Songwriter of the Year	Himself	Won	
ASCAP Pop Music Awards	1994	Most Performed Songs	"The One"	Won	
ASCAP Pop Music Awards	1994	Most Performed Songs	"The Last Song"	Won	
ASCAP Pop Music Awards	1994	Most Performed Songs	"Simple Life"	Won	
ASCAP Pop Music Awards	1996	Most Performed Songs	"Believe"	Won	
ASCAP Pop Music Awards	1999	Most Performed Songs	"Something About the Way You Look Tonight"	Won	
American Music Awards	1974	Favorite Pop/Rock Male Artist	Himself	Nominated	
American Music Awards	1975	Favorite Pop/Rock Male Artist	Himself	Nominated	
American Music Awards	1975	Favorite Pop/Rock Album	Goodbye Yellow Brick Road	Nominated	
American Music Awards	1976	Favorite Pop/Rock Male Artist	Himself	Nominated	
American Music Awards	1976	Favorite Pop/Rock Album	Greatest Hits	Nominated	
American Music Awards	1976	Favorite Pop/Rock Single	"Philadelphia Freedom"	Nominated	
American Music Awards	1977	Favorite Pop/Rock Male Artist	Himself	Won	
American Music Awards	1977	Favorite Pop/Rock Single	"Don't Go Breaking My Heart" (with Kiki Dee)	Won	
American Music Awards	1996	Favorite Pop/Rock Male Artist	Himself	Nominated	
American Music Awards	1998	Favorite Adult Contemporary Artist	Himself	Won	
American Music Awards	2019	Tour of the Year	Farewell Yellow Brick Road	Nominated	
American Music Awards	2022	Favorite Touring Artist	Himself	Nominated	
Berlin Music Video Awards	2022	Best Animation	Cold Heart	Nominated	
BMI Pop Awards	1996	Award-Winning Song	"Circle of Life"	Won	
BMI Pop Awards	1996	Award-Winning Song	"Can You Feel the Love Tonight"	Won	
BMI Pop Awards	1999	Award-Winning Song	"Something About the Way You Look Tonight"	Won	
BMI Pop Awards	1999	Award-Winning Song	"Candle in the Wind 1997"	Won	
Brit Awards	1977	Best British Male	Himself	Nominated	
Brit Awards	1977	Best British Album	Goodbye Yellow Brick Road	Nominated	
Brit Awards	1984	Best British Male	Himself	Nominated	
Brit Awards	1986	Best British Male	Himself	Nominated	
Brit Awards	1986	Outstanding Contribution to Music	Himself	Won	
Brit Awards	1991	Best British Male	Himself	Won	
Brit Awards	1991	Best British Album	Sleeping with the Past	Nominated	
Brit Awards	1993	Best British Album	The One	Nominated	
Brit Awards	1993	Best British Male	Himself	Nominated	
Brit Awards	1995	Outstanding Contribution to Music	Himself	Won	
Brit Awards	1998	Freddie Mercury Award	Himself	Won	
Brit Awards	1998	Best British Male	Himself	Nominated	
Brit Awards	1998	Best British Single	"Candle in the Wind 1997"	Nominated	
Brit Awards	2002	Best British Video	"I Want Love"	Nominated	
Brit Awards	2002	Best British Male	Himself	Nominated	
Brit Awards	2013	Brits Icon	Himself	Won	
Brit Awards	2023	Song of the Year	"Merry Christmas"	Nominated	
British LGBT Awards	2015	Global Icon	Himself	Nominated	
British LGBT Awards	2017	Music Artist	Himself	Nominated	
British LGBT Awards	2020	Global Impact	Elton John AIDS Foundation	Won	
Classic Rock Roll of Honour Awards	2016	Album of the Year	Wonderful Crazy Night	Nominated	
Ivor Novello Awards	1974	Best Song Musically and Lyrically	"Daniel"	Won	
Ivor Novello Awards	1977	The Best Pop Song	"Don't Go Breaking My Heart"	Won	
Ivor Novello Awards	1977	International Hit of the Year	"Don't Go Breaking My Heart"	Nominated	
Ivor Novello Awards	1977	Most Performed Work	"Don't Go Breaking My Heart"	Nominated	
Ivor Novello Awards	1979	Best Instrumental or Popular Orchestral Work	"Song for Guy"	Won	
Ivor Novello Awards	1986	Outstanding Contribution to British Music	Himself	Won	
Ivor Novello Awards	1986	International Hit of the Year	"Nikita"	Nominated	
Ivor Novello Awards	1986	Best Song Musically and Lyrically	"Nikita"	Won	
Ivor Novello Awards	1991	Best Song Musically and Lyrically	"Sacrifice"	Won	
Ivor Novello Awards	1991	Best Selling A-Side	"Sacrifice"	Won	
Ivor Novello Awards	1995	Best Song Included in Film	"Circle of Life"	Won	
Ivor Novello Awards	1998	Best Selling UK Single	"Candle in the Wind 1997"	Won	
Ivor Novello Awards	2000	International Achievement in Musical Theater	Himself	Won	
Ivor Novello Awards	2007	Most Performed Work	"I Don't Feel Like Dancin'"	Won	
Ivor Novello Awards	2007	International Hit of the Year	"I Don't Feel Like Dancin'"	Nominated	
Juno Awards	1986	International Single of the Year	"Nikita"	Nominated	
MTV Video Music Awards	1984	Best Choreography in a Video	"I'm Still Standing"	Nominated	
MTV Video Music Awards	1984	Best Editing in a Video	"I'm Still Standing"	Nominated	
MTV Video Music Awards	1985	Best Choreography in a Video	"Sad Songs (Say So Much)"	Won	
MTV Video Music Awards	1987	Special Recognition Award	Himself	Won	
MTV Video Music Awards	1995	Best Male Video	"Believe"	Nominated	
MTV Video Music Awards	2002	Best Male Video	"This Train Don't Stop There Anymore"	Nominated	
MTV Video Music Awards	2002	Best Direction in a Video	"This Train Don't Stop There Anymore"	Nominated	
MTV Video Music Awards	2002	Best Art Direction in a Video	"This Train Don't Stop There Anymore"	Nominated	
MTV Video Music Awards	2022	Song of the Year	"Cold Heart (Pnau remix)"	Nominated	
MTV Video Music Awards	2022	Best Collaboration	"Cold Heart (Pnau remix)"	Nominated	
MVPA Awards	2002	Best Hair	"This Train Don't Stop There Anymore"	Won	
MVPA Awards	2003	Best Adult Contemporary Video	"Original Sin"	Won	
Music Week Awards	2026	Artist Marketing Campaign	Himself and Brandi Carlile	Pending	
Music Week Awards	2026	PR Campaign	Himself and Brandi Carlile	Pending	
Music Week Awards	2026	Catalogue Marketing Campaign	Himself	Pending	
Music Week Awards	2026	Radio Show	Rocket Hour, Apple Music 1	Pending	
My VH1 Music Awards	2000	Legend in Action	Himself	Nominated	
NRJ Music Awards	2003	International Song of the Year	"Sorry Seems to Be the Hardest Word" with Blue	Won	
Žebřík Music Awards	2005	Best International Personality	Himself	Nominated	

== Honorary awards, degrees, and titles ==
Sir Elton John's coat of arms. Granted to him in 1987, the shield includes piano keys and records. The Spanish motto, el tono es bueno, combines a pun on Elton John's name with the translation "the tone is good". The black, red and gold colours are also those of Watford F.C. The steel helmet above the shield faced forwards and with its visor open indicates that John is a knight.

Organizations	Year	Notes	Result	Ref.
Hollywood Walk of Fame	1975	Recording Star at 6915 Hollywood Blvd.	Honored	
Songwriters Hall of Fame	1992	Inductee	Honored	
Rock and Roll Hall of Fame	1994	Inductee	Honored	
Queen Elizabeth II	1996	Commander of the Order of the British Empire (CBE) (Note: for services to Music and for charitable services.)	Honored	
Queen Elizabeth II	1998	Knight Bachelor	Honored	(Note: Numerous sources:)
The Recording Academy	1999	MusiCares Person of the Year (Note: for his artistic achievement in the music industry and dedication to philanthropy.)	Honored	
The Recording Academy	2000	Grammy Legend Award	Honored	
Royal Academy of Music, London	2002	Honorary Doctorate of Music	Honored	
Society of Singers	2005	Lifetime Achievement Award	Honored	
John F. Kennedy Center for the Performing Arts	2004	Kennedy Center Honor	Honored	
Disney Legends	2006	Hall of Fame Award	Honored	
PRS for Music	2010	Heritage Award (Note: which was erected on The Namaste Lounge Pub in Northwood, London, where John performed his first gig.)	Honored	
The Royal Mail	2019	Sir Elton was featured on a series of UK postage stamps	Honored	
French President Emmanuel Macron	2019	Knight of the Legion of Honour	Honored	
King Charles III (Note: (then Prince Charles))	2020	Member of the Order of the Companions of Honour (CH) (Note: for services to music and to charity.)	Honored	
United States President Joe Biden	2022	National Humanities Medal (Note: received after performing at the White House)	Honored	
Rolling Stone	2023	Sir John at #100 on its list of the 200 Greatest Singers of All Time	Honored	
Time Magazine	2024	Icon of the Year	Honored	
