= Elton: Jewel Box =

Compilation album by Elton John
- Released: 13 November 2020
- Recorded: 1965–2020
- Genre: Pop
- Labels: EMI; Universal Music Catalogue

Elton John chronology
The Lion King (2019)	Elton: Jewel Box (2020)	Regimental Sgt. Zippo (2021)

Professional ratings
Review scores
Source	Rating
AllMusic	4/5 stars

Elton: Jewel Box is an eight-disc compilation album by Elton John, released in 2020. It features rare songs from his catalogue including deep cuts, non-album B-sides and 60 previously unreleased songs and demos. John selected the songs for the compilation, which contains a total of 148 songs, organised in four parts: Deep Cuts, Rarities, B-sides, and And This Is Me.., ending with the song "(I'm Gonna) Love Me Again" featuring Taron Egerton from John's 2019 biopic film Rocketman.

== Reception ==
David Browne, in a review for Rolling Stone, notes that the box set is "the most exhaustive and personal retrospective release Elton has ever put together." Chris Roberts, writing for Classic Rock, feels it is "every bit the treasure trove for fans that it aims to be."

== Track listing ==
All songs written by Elton John and Bernie Taupin, except where noted.

=== Discs 1 and 2: Deep Cuts ===
Discs 1 and 2 consist of lesser known songs, handpicked by Elton John from previously released albums.

CD 1: Deep Cuts
No.	Title	Album	Length
1.	"Monkey Suit" (with Leon Russell)	The Union, 2010	4:44
2.	"Where to Now St. Peter?"	Tumbleweed Connection, 1970	4:13
3.	"Mellow"	Honky Château, 1972	5:31
4.	"The Ballad of Danny Bailey (1909–34)"	Goodbye Yellow Brick Road, 1973	4:22
5.	"Chameleon"	Blue Moves, 1976	5:29
6.	"Gone to Shiloh" (with Leon Russell and Neil Young)	The Union	4:49
7.	"We All Fall in Love Sometimes"	Captain Fantastic and the Brown Dirt Cowboy, 1975	4:17
8.	"Too Low for Zero"	Too Low for Zero, 1983	5:46
9.	"The Power" (with Little Richard)	Duets, 1993	6:26
10.	"All That I'm Allowed"	Peachtree Road, 2004	4:53
11.	"The Bridge"	The Captain & the Kid, 2006	3:35
12.	"The New Fever Waltz"	The Diving Board, 2013	4:40
13.	"Stone's Throw from Hurtin'"	Sleeping with the Past, 1989	4:58
14.	"The North"	The One, 1992	5:16
15.	"Hoop of Fire"	Leather Jackets, 1986	4:17
16.	"Boogie Pilgrim"	Blue Moves	6:07
Total length:			79:23

CD 2: Deep Cuts
No.	Title	Album	Length
1.	"Ticking"	Caribou, 1974	7:37
2.	"Crystal"	Too Low for Zero	5:08
3.	"All Quiet on the Western Front"	Jump Up!, 1982	6:03
4.	"Tell Me When the Whistle Blows"	Captain Fantastic and the Brown Dirt Cowboy	4:21
5.	"Freaks in Love"	Peachtree Road	4:35
6.	"Never Too Old (To Hold Somebody)" (with Leon Russell)	The Union	4:55
7.	"The Emperor's New Clothes"	Songs from the West Coast, 2001	4:27
8.	"House"	Made in England, 1995	4:28
9.	"(Gotta Get a) Meal Ticket"	Captain Fantastic and the Brown Dirt Cowboy	4:02
10.	"Understanding Women"	The One	5:05
11.	"Shoot Down the Moon"	Ice on Fire, 1985	4:55
12.	"Have Mercy on the Criminal"	Don't Shoot Me I'm Only the Piano Player, 1973	5:56
13.	"Blues for My Baby and Me"	Don't Shoot Me I'm Only the Piano Player	5:40
14.	"My Quicksand"	The Diving Board	4:47
15.	"Street Kids"	Rock of the Westies, 1975	6:25
Total length:			79:14

=== Discs 3, 4 and 5: Rarities (1965–1971) ===
Discs 3–5 contain early demos of previously unreleased material as well as original piano demos of songs from his earlier albums. On 17 September 2020, two months prior to the album's release date, a 1969 demo recording of "Sing Me No Sad Songs" was released for the very first time. This song, described as "a fascinating early taste of what was to come from Elton and Bernie", was used to promote the album.

John describes the early demos as nostalgic and said that "it was so beautiful to listen to the naiveties of some of the songs." He also talked about these songs in the context of representing his humble beginnings and how they helped shape and define him as an artist as well as show the unique relationship John and Taupin had, not only as songwriters but also as friends.

CD 3: Rarities Part One: 1965–1968
No.	Title	Writer(s)	Length
1.	"Come Back Baby" (performed by Bluesology)	John (credited as Reg Dwight)	2:47
2.	"Mr. Frantic" (performed by Bluesology)	John (credited as Reg Dwight)	2:23
3.	"Scarecrow" (piano/tambourine demo)		3:12
4.	"A Dandelion Dies in the Wind" (piano demo)		2:38
5.	"Velvet Fountain" (piano demo)		2:55
6.	"A Little Love Goes a Long Way" (piano demo)	John (credited as Reg Dwight)	3:00
7.	"If You Could See Me Now" (piano demo)	John (credited as Reg Dwight)	3:37
8.	"Mr. Lightning Strikerman" (piano demo)		3:06
9.	"Countryside Love Affair" (piano demo)	John (credited as Reg Dwight)	2:51
10.	"I Could Never Fall in Love with Anybody Else" (piano demo)	John (credited as Reg Dwight)	2:03
11.	"I Get a Little Bit Lonely" (piano demo)	John (credited as Reg Dwight)	2:20
12.	"The Witch's House" (piano demo)	John (credited as Reg Dwight)	2:05
13.	"Get Out of This Town" (piano/tambourine demo)	John (credited as Reg Dwight)	2:34
14.	"Year of the Teddy Bear" (piano demo)		3:39
15.	"Where It's At" (piano/percussion demo)	John; Nicky James	2:02
16.	"Who's Gonna Love You" (piano/percussion demo)	John; Kirk Duncan	2:39
17.	"Nina" (band version)		3:42
18.	"Angel Tree" (piano/guitar/tambourine demo)		2:11
19.	"Here's to the Next Time" (piano/tambourine demo)	John	3:22
20.	"Thank You for All Your Loving" (band version)	John; Caleb Quaye	3:27
21.	"Watching the Planes Go By" (band version)		4:10
22.	"When the First Tear Shows" (arranged band version)		3:03
23.	"Tartan Coloured Lady" (arranged band version)		4:12
Total length:			67:58

CD 4: Rarities Part Two: 1968
No.	Title	Writer(s)	Length
1.	"Hourglass" (arranged band version)		2:47
2.	"71-75 New Oxford Street" (band demo)	John	3:09
3.	"Turn to Me" (arranged band version)		3:20
4.	"Reminds Me of You" (piano demo)		2:50
5.	"I Can't Go On Living Without You" (arranged band demo)	John (credited to John and Taupin)	2:57
6.	"And the Clock Goes Round" (piano demo)		2:37
7.	"When I Was Tealby Abbey" (piano demo)		2:23
8.	"I'll Stop Living When You Stop Loving Me" (piano demo)		2:23
9.	"Trying to Hold On to a Love That's Dying" (piano demo)		2:31
10.	"Sitting Doing Nothing" (band version)	John; Quaye	2:42
11.	"Regimental Sgt. Zippo" (band version)		4:01
12.	"Cry Willow Cry" (band demo)		3:41
13.	"There Is Still a Little Love" (band demo)		3:57
14.	"If I Asked You" (band demo)		2:51
15.	"Skyline Pigeon" (piano demo)		3:26
16.	"Two of a Kind" (arranged band demo)		2:24
17.	"The Girl on Angel Pavement" (arranged band demo)		2:26
18.	"Smokestack Children" (arranged band demo)		2:31
19.	"Baby I Miss You" (band demo)		2:39
20.	"All Across the Havens" (piano/guitar demo)		3:15
21.	"Bonnie's Gone Away" (piano/guitar demo)		3:37
22.	"Just an Ordinary Man" (piano demo)		4:01
23.	"There's Still Time for Me" (piano/guitar/tambourine demo)		2:45
Total length:			69:13

CD 5: Rarities Part Three: 1968–1971
No.	Title	Writer(s)	Length
1.	"The Tide Will Turn for Rebecca" (piano demo)		3:01
2.	"Dick Barton Theme (Devil's Gallop)" (performed by Bread and Beer Band)	Charles Williams	2:16
3.	"Breakdown Blues" (performed by Bread and Beer Band)	John (credited as Reg Dwight); Quaye; Lennox Jackson; Bernie Calvert	5:05
4.	"Taking the Sun from My Eyes" (arranged band version)		2:47
5.	"It's Me That You Need" (band demo)		4:03
6.	"Sing Me No Sad Songs" (band demo)		2:39
7.	"The Flowers Will Never Die" (piano demo)		2:50
8.	"In the Morning" (band demo)		2:47
9.	"Open Your Eyes to the Sun" (band demo)		2:37
10.	"One Time, Sometime or Never" (band demo)		3:51
11.	"Slow Fade to Blue" (piano/guitar demo)		4:58
12.	"Rolling Western Union" (piano demo)		3:54
13.	"My Father's Gun" (piano demo)		4:17
14.	"Amoreena" (piano demo)		3:48
15.	"Burn Down the Mission" (piano demo)		7:06
16.	"Razor Face" (piano demo)		3:44
17.	"Madman Across the Water" (piano demo)		5:07
18.	"Holiday Inn" (piano demo)		4:34
19.	"All the Nasties" (piano demo)		4:51
Total length:			74:15

=== Discs 6 and 7: B-sides (1976–2005) ===
Discs 6 and 7 contain rare B-sides, many of which have been digitised for the first time. These discs contain 17 songs that were previously only available on vinyl. These tracks, together with the non-album singles released between 1968 and 1975 included on Rare Masters, make all of John's non-album singles available digitally.

In 1980, Elton John sang two duets with French singer France Gall on her single "Les Aveux" / "Donner Pour Donner". Another French song featured on the album is "J'veux D'la Tendresse", a song which was the basis for "Nobody Wins" from The Fox.

CD 6: B-sides Part One: 1976–1984
No.	Title	Writer(s)	Original release	Length
1.	"Snow Queen" (with Kiki Dee)	John; Taupin; Davey Johnstone; Dee; David Nutter	"Don't Go Breaking My Heart", 1976	5:54
2.	"Conquer the Sun"	John; Gary Osborne	"Little Jeannie", 1980	4:21
3.	"Cartier"	John; Osborne (credited as Dinah Card and Carte Blanche)	"Sartorial Eloquence (Don't Ya Wanna Play This Game No More?)", 1980	0:58
4.	"White Man Danger"	John; Osborne	"Sartorial Eloquence (Don't Ya Wanna Play This Game No More?)"	5:26
5.	"Tactics" (instrumental)	John	"Dear God", 1980	2:48
6.	"Steal Away Child"	John; Osborne	"Dear God"	3:06
7.	"Love So Cold"		"Dear God"	5:04
8.	"Les Aveux" (with France Gall)	Michel Berger; John	single, 1981	4:14
9.	"Donner Pour Donner" (with France Gall)	Berger; Taupin	"Les Aveux"	4:28
10.	"J'veux D'la Tendresse"	Jean-Paul Dreau	single, 1981	3:39
11.	"Fools in Fashion"		"Nobody Wins", 1981	4:18
12.	"Can't Get Over Getting Over Losing You"	John; Osborne	"Just Like Belgium", 1981	4:16
13.	"Tortured"		"Chloe", 1981	4:44
14.	"Hey Papa Legba"		"Blue Eyes", 1982	5:17
15.	"Take Me Down to the Ocean"	John; Osborne	"Empty Garden (Hey Hey Johnny)", 1982	4:08
16.	"Where Have All the Good Times Gone?" (alternate mix)		"Ball and Chain", 1982	4:07
17.	"The Retreat"		"Princess", 1982	4:47
18.	"Choc Ice Goes Mental" (instrumental)	John	"I Guess That's Why They Call It the Blues", 1983	2:04
19.	"A Simple Man"	John; Osborne	"Sad Songs (Say So Much)", 1984	3:52
Total length:				77:31

CD 7: B-sides Part Two: 1984–2005
No.	Title	Writer(s)	Original release	Length
1.	"Lonely Boy"	John; Osborne	"Passengers", 1984	4:50
2.	"Highlander" (instrumental)	John	"Heartache All Over the World", 1986	3:40
3.	"Billy and the Kids"		"Slow Rivers", 1986	4:25
4.	"Lord of the Flies"		"Slow Rivers"	4:40
5.	"Rope Around a Fool"		"I Don't Wanna Go On with You Like That", 1988	3:50
6.	"Medicine Man"		"You Gotta Love Someone", 1990	4:36
7.	"I Know Why I'm in Love"		"Something About the Way You Look Tonight", 1997	4:32
8.	"Big Man in a Little Suit"		"Recover Your Soul", 1998	4:26
9.	"God Never Came Here"		"I Want Love", 2001	3:53
10.	"The North Star"		"I Want Love"	5:34
11.	"Did Anybody Sleep with Joan of Arc"		"This Train Don't Stop There Anymore", 2001	4:19
12.	"So Sad the Renegade"		"All That I'm Allowed", 2004	5:06
13.	"A Little Peace"		"All That I'm Allowed"	3:59
14.	"Keep It a Mystery"		"All That I'm Allowed"	4:17
15.	"How's Tomorrow"		"Turn the Lights Out When You Leave", 2005	5:22
16.	"Peter's Song"		"Turn the Lights Out When You Leave"	3:41
17.	"Things Only Get Better with Love"		"Turn the Lights Out When You Leave"	5:18
Total length:				76:28

=== Disc 8: And This Is Me... ===
The eighth and final disc features songs mentioned in John's autobiography Me which John says played an important part in his life. The song "(I'm Gonna) Love Me Again", a duet with Taron Egerton who portrayed John in his film Rocketman, is also included.

CD 8: And This Is Me...
No.	Title	Writer(s)	Album	Length
1.	"Empty Sky"		Empty Sky, 1969	8:29
2.	"Lady Samantha"		non-album single, 1969	3:05
3.	"Border Song"		Elton John, 1970	3:21
4.	"My Father's Gun"		Tumbleweed Connection	6:21
5.	"All the Nasties"		Madman Across the Water, 1971	5:09
6.	"I Think I'm Going to Kill Myself"		Honky Château	3:33
7.	"Philadelphia Freedom"		non-album single, 1975	5:33
8.	"Song for Guy"	John	A Single Man, 1978	5:02
9.	"Sartorial Eloquence"	John; Tom Robinson	21 at 33, 1980	4:45
10.	"Elton's Song"	John; Robinson	The Fox, 1981	3:03
11.	"Cold as Christmas (In the Middle of the Year)"		Too Low for Zero	4:20
12.	"I Fall Apart"		Leather Jackets	4:03
13.	"Amazes Me"		Sleeping with the Past	4:40
14.	"The Last Song"		The One	3:23
15.	"American Triangle"		Songs from the West Coast	4:52
16.	"(I'm Gonna) Love Me Again" (with Taron Egerton)		Rocketman: Music from the Motion Picture, 2019	4:13
Total length:				73:52

== LP version ==
Three LP sets were released: Deep Cuts, Rarities & B-Sides, and And This Is Me. The Rarities & B-Sides set is abridged: it features 35 demos and 5 B-sides across three LPs. The other sets are complete.

== Charts ==
Chart (2020)	Peak position
Austrian Albums (Ö3 Austria)	64
Belgian Albums (Ultratop Flanders)	80
German Albums (Offizielle Top 100)	24
Scottish Albums (Official Charts)	28
Spanish Albums (Promusicae)	89
Swiss Albums (Schweizer Hitparade)	35
UK Albums (Official Charts)	68
