= Greatest Hits 1970–2002 =

Greatest hits album by Elton John
- Released: 11 November 2002
- Recorded: 1970–2002
- Genre: Rock
- Length: 156:46 (Europe); 157:40 (North America)
- Label: UTV

Elton John chronology
Songs from the West Coast (2001)	Greatest Hits 1970–2002 (2002)	Remixed (2003)

Professional ratings
Review scores
Source	Rating
AllMusic	4.5/5 stars
The Encyclopedia of Popular Music	5/5 stars

Greatest Hits 1970–2002 is a career-spanning compilation album of popular songs by British musician Elton John, released on UTV Records in 2002. It debuted on the Billboard 200 chart at number 12 on 30 November 2002, for a total run of 67 weeks. It was certified gold and platinum in December 2002, double platinum in March 2003, triple platinum in August 2004, four- and five-times platinum simultaneously in February 2011, and 6× platinum in April 2016 by the RIAA.

This was the first Elton John compilation released since PolyGram, which had controlled his pre-1976 catalogue, was sold to Universal Music Group, which controlled the post-1976 recordings. Before 1992, rights to John's music had been complicated as they shifted between various companies. UMG now owns worldwide distribution rights to all of John's music, while sharing overall ownership with John himself. It was configured differently for the American and European markets, and also available in a three-compact disc version in addition to the standard two-disc version. It contains every song released on the first two greatest hits packages released respectively in 1974 and 1977, with the exceptions of "Border Song" on Greatest Hits; "Grow Some Funk of Your Own", "Lucy in the Sky with Diamonds", and "Pinball Wizard" from Greatest Hits Vol. II, as well as "Levon" on the European version. All of those excepting for "Grow Some Funk of Your Own" are available on the bonus disc to the European edition.

In 2004, the album was reissued with the 2003 UK singles chart number one hit "Are You Ready for Love" as the final track on the second disc, replacing "Song for Guy". "Kiss the Bride" was also omitted to make room for the remake of "Sorry Seems to Be the Hardest Word" featuring the boy band Blue. The two newer hits are appended at the end of the third disc for the expanded editions, leaving the second disc tracklisting intact.

== Track listing ==
All songs written by Elton John and Bernie Taupin unless otherwise noted.

=== European release ===
Disc one
No.	Title	Album	Length
1.	"Your Song"	Elton John, 1970	4:03
2.	"Tiny Dancer"	Madman Across the Water, 1971	6:17
3.	"Honky Cat"	Honky Château, 1972	5:14
4.	"Rocket Man"	Honky Château	4:43
5.	"Crocodile Rock"	Don't Shoot Me I'm Only the Piano Player, 1973	3:56
6.	"Daniel"	Don't Shoot Me I'm Only the Piano Player	3:54
7.	"Saturday Night's Alright for Fighting"	Goodbye Yellow Brick Road, 1973	4:54
8.	"Goodbye Yellow Brick Road"	Goodbye Yellow Brick Road	3:15
9.	"Candle in the Wind"	Goodbye Yellow Brick Road	3:50
10.	"Bennie and the Jets"	Goodbye Yellow Brick Road	5:23
11.	"Don't Let the Sun Go Down on Me"	Caribou, 1974	5:38
12.	"The Bitch Is Back"	Caribou	3:45
13.	"Philadelphia Freedom" (edited version)	Non-album single, 1975	5:21
14.	"Someone Saved My Life Tonight"	Captain Fantastic and the Brown Dirt Cowboy, 1975	6:45
15.	"Island Girl"	Rock of the Westies, 1975	3:43
16.	"Don't Go Breaking My Heart" (with Kiki Dee)	Non-album single, 1976	4:35
17.	"Sorry Seems to Be the Hardest Word"	Blue Moves, 1976	3:53

Disc two
No.	Title	Writer(s)	Album	Length
1.	"Blue Eyes"	Elton John, Gary Osborne	Jump Up!, 1982	3:29
2.	"I'm Still Standing"		Too Low for Zero, 1983	3:03
3.	"I Guess That's Why They Call It the Blues"	Elton John, Bernie Taupin, Davey Johnstone	Too Low for Zero	4:44
4.	"Sad Songs (Say So Much)" (7" edit)		Breaking Hearts, 1984	4:10
5.	"Nikita"		Ice on Fire, 1985	5:45
6.	"Sacrifice"		Sleeping with the Past, 1989	5:06
7.	"The One"		The One, 1992	5:53
8.	"Kiss the Bride"		Too Low for Zero	4:23
9.	"Can You Feel the Love Tonight"	Tim Rice, Elton John	The Lion King: Original Motion Picture Soundtrack, 1994	4:03
10.	"Circle of Life"	Tim Rice, Elton John	The Lion King: Original Motion Picture Soundtrack	4:52
11.	"Believe"		Made in England, 1995	4:48
12.	"Made in England"		Made in England	4:51
13.	"Something About the Way You Look Tonight" (single edit)		The Big Picture, 1997	4:01
14.	"Written in the Stars" (with LeAnn Rimes)	Tim Rice, Elton John	Elton John and Tim Rice's Aida, 1999	4:17
15.	"I Want Love"		Songs from the West Coast, 2001	4:37
16.	"This Train Don't Stop There Anymore"		Songs from the West Coast	4:40
17.	"Song for Guy" (single edit)		A Single Man, 1978	5:10

Disc three
No.	Title	Writer(s)	Album	Length
1.	"Levon"		Madman Across the Water	5:24
2.	"Border Song"		Elton John	3:24
3.	"Lucy in the Sky with Diamonds" (7" edit)	John Lennon, Paul McCartney	Non-album single, 1974	5:57
4.	"Pinball Wizard"	Pete Townshend	Tommy soundtrack, 1975	5:17
5.	"True Love" (featuring Kiki Dee)	Cole Porter	Duets, 1993	3:35
6.	"Live Like Horses" (featuring Luciano Pavarotti) (single version)		The Big Picture	5:08
7.	"I Don't Wanna Go on with You Like That"		Reg Strikes Back, 1988	4:32
8.	"Don't Let the Sun Go Down on Me" (featuring George Michael) (live)		Duets	5:49
9.	"Your Song" (featuring Alessandro Safina)		Previously unissued, 2002	4:24

Greatest Hits 1970–2002 – European Special Edition bonus tracks
No.	Title	Writer(s)	Length
10.	"Sorry Seems to Be the Hardest Word"		3:38
11.	"Are You Ready for Love"	Casey James, Thom Bell, LeRoy Bell	3:29

=== North American release ===
Disc one
No.	Title	Album	Length
1.	"Your Song"	Elton John	4:05
2.	"Levon"	Madman Across the Water	5:25
3.	"Tiny Dancer"	Madman Across the Water	6:18
4.	"Rocket Man (I Think It's Going to Be a Long, Long Time)"	Honky Château	4:45
5.	"Honky Cat"	Honky Château	5:09
6.	"Crocodile Rock"	Don't Shoot Me I'm Only the Piano Player	3:57
7.	"Daniel"	Don't Shoot Me I'm Only the Piano Player	3:52
8.	"Saturday Night's Alright for Fighting"	Goodbye Yellow Brick Road	4:08
9.	"Goodbye Yellow Brick Road"	Goodbye Yellow Brick Road	3:16
10.	"Candle in the Wind"	Goodbye Yellow Brick Road	3:51
11.	"Bennie and the Jets"	Goodbye Yellow Brick Road	5:09
12.	"Don't Let the Sun Go Down on Me"	Caribou	5:38
13.	"The Bitch Is Back"	Caribou	3:44
14.	"Philadelphia Freedom" (edited version)	Non-album single	5:22
15.	"Someone Saved My Life Tonight"	Captain Fantastic and the Brown Dirt Cowboy	6:47
16.	"Island Girl"	Rock of the Westies	3:45
17.	"Sorry Seems to Be the Hardest Word"	Blue Moves	3:50

Disc two
No.	Title	Writer(s)	Album	Length
1.	"Don't Go Breaking My Heart" (with Kiki Dee)		Non-album single	4:28
2.	"Little Jeannie"	Elton John, Gary Osborne	21 at 33	5:05
3.	"I'm Still Standing"		Too Low for Zero	3:04
4.	"I Guess That's Why They Call It the Blues"	Elton John, Bernie Taupin, Davey Johnstone	Too Low for Zero	4:44
5.	"Sad Songs (Say So Much)"		Breaking Hearts	4:11
6.	"I Don't Wanna Go on with You Like That"		Reg Strikes Back	4:33
7.	"Nikita"		Ice on Fire	5:46
8.	"Sacrifice"		Sleeping with the Past	5:07
9.	"The One"		The One	5:53
10.	"Can You Feel the Love Tonight"	Tim Rice, Elton John	The Lion King soundtrack	4:03
11.	"Circle of Life"	Tim Rice, Elton John	The Lion King soundtrack	4:53
12.	"Believe"		Made in England	4:52
13.	"Blessed"		Made in England	4:23
14.	"Something About the Way You Look Tonight" (single edit)		The Big Picture	4:02
15.	"Written in the Stars" (with LeAnn Rimes)	Tim Rice, Elton John	Elton John and Tim Rice's Aida	4:17
16.	"I Want Love"		Songs from the West Coast	4:38
17.	"This Train Don't Stop There Anymore"		Songs from the West Coast	4:41

Disc three
No.	Title	Length
1.	"Candle in the Wind" (live)	4:02
2.	"Don't Let the Sun Go Down on Me" (with George Michael) (live)	5:49
3.	"Live Like Horses" (with Luciano Pavarotti) (single version)	5:08
4.	"Your Song" (with Alessandro Safina)	4:19

== Charts ==
=== Weekly charts ===
Chart (2002–2017)	Peak position
Australian Albums (ARIA)	6
Austrian Albums (Ö3 Austria)	19
Belgian Albums (Ultratop Flanders)	8
Belgian Albums (Ultratop Wallonia)	30
Canadian Albums (Billboard)	68
Danish Albums (Hitlisten)	2
Dutch Albums (Album Top 100)	14
French Albums (SNEP)	74
German Albums (Offizielle Top 100)	19
Irish Albums (IRMA)	8
Italian Albums (FIMI)	13
Japanese Albums (Oricon)	45
New Zealand Albums (RMNZ)	8
Norwegian Albums (VG-lista)	6
Scottish Albums (Official Charts)	2
Spanish Albums (Promusicae)	80
Swedish Albums (Sverigetopplistan)	12
Swiss Albums (Schweizer Hitparade)	12
UK Albums (Official Charts)	3
US Billboard 200	12
US Top Rock Albums (Billboard)	7

=== Year-end charts ===
Chart (2002)	Position
UK Albums (OCC)	17

Chart (2003)	Position
Australian Albums (ARIA)	43
Dutch Albums (Album Top 100)	67
UK Albums (OCC)	33
US Billboard 200	62

Chart (2016)	Position
US Billboard 200	184

Chart (2017)	Position
US Top Rock Albums (Billboard)	55

== Certifications ==
Region	Certification	Certified units/sales
Australia (ARIA)	2× Platinum	140,000^{^}
Austria (IFPI Austria)	Gold	15,000^{*}
Brazil (Pro-Música Brasil)	Gold	50,000^{*}
Canada (Music Canada)	4× Platinum	400,000^{^}
Denmark (IFPI Danmark)	Platinum	50,000^{^}
France (SNEP)	Gold	100,000^{*}
Germany (BVMI)	Platinum	300,000^{‡}
New Zealand (RMNZ)	2× Platinum	30,000^{^}
Norway (IFPI Norway)	Platinum	40,000^{*}
Sweden (GLF)	Gold	30,000^{^}
Switzerland (IFPI Switzerland) certified in 2002	Gold	20,000^{^}
Switzerland (IFPI Switzerland) certified in 2003	Gold	20,000^{^}
United Kingdom (BPI)	5× Platinum	1,500,000^{*}
United States (RIAA)	6× Platinum	6,000,000^{‡}
Summaries
Europe (IFPI)	2× Platinum	2,000,000^{*}
^{*} Sales figures based on certification alone.^{^} Shipments figures based on certification alone.^{‡} Sales+streaming figures based on certification alone.
