= List of awards and nominations received by Taron Egerton =

Taron Egerton awards and nominations
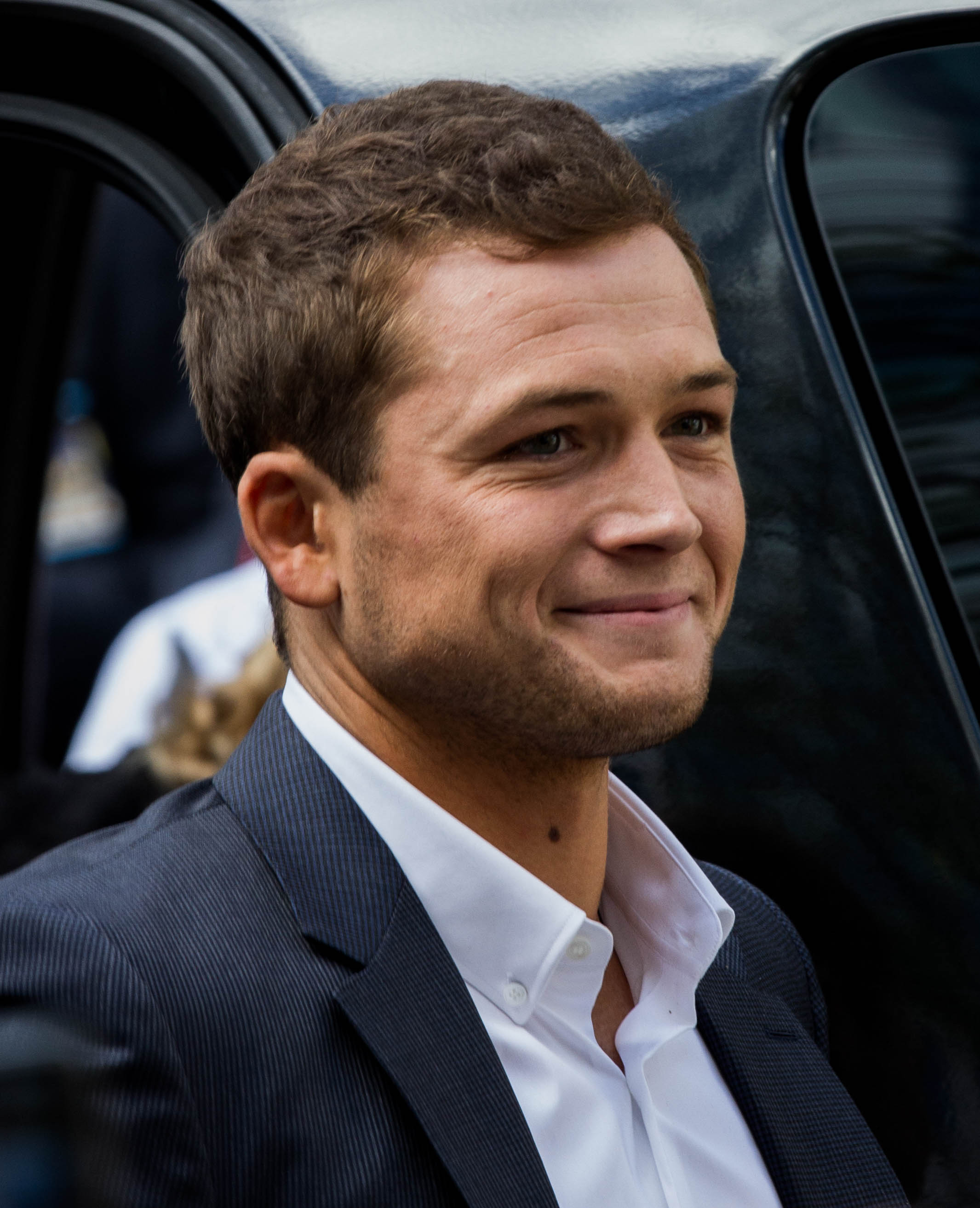
- Egerton at the 2016 Toronto International Film Festival
Awards and nominations
Award	Wins	Nominations
Actor Awards	0	2
British Academy Film Awards	0	2
British Academy Television Awards	0	2
Golden Globes	1	2
Grammy Awards	0	1
Primetime Emmy Awards	0	1

Totals (Note: Certain award groups do not simply award one winner. They acknowledge several different recipients, have runners-up, and have third place. Since this is a specific recognition and is different from losing an award, runner-up mentions are considered wins in this award tally. For simplification and to avoid errors, each award in this list has been presumed to have had a prior nomination.)
- Wins: 11
- Nominations: 44

Taron Egerton is a Welsh actor who has received various awards and nominations throughout his career.

Egerton first gained recognition for starring as Gary "Eggsy" Unwin in the action comedy film Kingsman: The Secret Service (2014) and its sequel Kingsman: The Golden Circle (2017), for which he won the Empire Award for Best Male Newcomer and was nominated for the Saturn Award for Best Actor. In 2014, he was also one of the nominees for the BAFTA Rising Star Award.

He received critical acclaim for his portrayal of singer-songwriter Elton John in the musical Rocketman (2019). The role won him the Golden Globe Award for Best Actor in a Motion Picture – Musical or Comedy and earned him nominations for the Actor Award for Outstanding Performance by a Male Actor in a Leading Role, the BAFTA Award for Best Actor in a Leading Role, and the Grammy Award for Best Compilation Soundtrack for Visual Media for his work on the film score. He starred in the Apple TV+ miniseries Black Bird (2022), which garnered him further nominations at the Actor Awards, BAFTA TV Awards, Golden Globe Awards and Primetime Emmy Awards.

== Major associations ==
=== Actor Awards ===
Year	Category	Nominated work	Result	Ref(s)
2020	Outstanding Performance by a Male Actor in a Leading Role in a Motion Picture	Rocketman	Nominated	
2023	Outstanding Performance by a Male Actor in a Television Movie or Limited Series	Black Bird	Nominated	

=== BAFTA Awards ===
Year	Category	Nominated work	Result	Ref(s)
British Academy Film Awards
2016	Rising Star Award	—N/a	Nominated	
2020	Best Actor in a Leading Role	Rocketman	Nominated	
British Academy Television Awards
2023	Best Actor	Black Bird	Nominated	
2026	Best Actor	Smoke	Nominated	

=== Golden Globes ===
Year	Category	Nominated work	Result	Ref(s)
2020	Best Actor in a Motion Picture – Musical or Comedy	Rocketman	Won	
2023	Best Actor in a Miniseries or Television Film	Black Bird	Nominated	

=== Grammy Awards ===
Year	Category	Nominated work	Result	Ref(s)
2020	Best Compilation Soundtrack for Visual Media	Rocketman: Music from the Motion Picture	Nominated	

=== Primetime Emmy Awards ===
Year	Category	Nominated work	Result	Ref(s)
2023	Outstanding Lead Actor in a Limited or Anthology Series or Movie	Black Bird	Nominated	

== Other associations ==
=== Audie Awards ===
Year	Category	Nominated work	Result	Ref(s)
2020	Autobiography or Memoir (Note: Shared with Elton John)	Me	Nominated	

=== BAFTA Cymru ===
Year	Category	Nominated work	Result	Ref(s)
2023	Best Actor	Black Bird	Won	

=== CinemaCon Awards ===
Year	Category	Nominated work	Result	Ref(s)
2018	Action Star of the Year	—N/a	Won	

=== Critics' Choice Super Awards ===
Year	Category	Nominated work	Result	Ref(s)
2024	Best Actor in a Superhero Movie	Tetris	Nominated	
2025	Best Actor in an Action Movie	Carry-On	Nominated	
2026	Best Actor in an Action Movie	Apex	Nominated	

=== Dorian Awards ===
Year	Category	Nominated work	Result	Ref(s)
2020	Film Performance of the Year – Actor	Rocketman	Nominated	

=== Empire Awards ===
Year	Category	Nominated work	Result	Ref(s)
2015	Best Male Newcomer	Kingsman: The Secret Service	Won	

=== Golden Schmoes Awards ===
Year	Category	Nominated work	Result	Ref(s)
2015	Breakthrough Performance of the Year	Kingsman: The Secret Service	Nominated	

=== GQ Awards ===
Year	Category	Nominated work	Result	Ref(s)
2019	Actor of the Year	Rocketman	Won	

=== Hollywood Film Awards ===
Year	Category	Nominated work	Result	Ref(s)
2019	Breakthrough Actor Award	Rocketman	Won	

=== Hollywood Music in Media Awards ===
Year	Category	Nominated work	Result	Ref(s)
2019	Best Original Song in a Feature Film (Note: Shared with Elton John and Bernie Taupin)	"(I'm Gonna) Love Me Again" (from Rocketman)	Nominated	

=== Huading Awards ===
Year	Category	Nominated work	Result	Ref(s)
2020	Best Global Original Song	"(I'm Gonna) Love Me Again" (from Rocketman)	Nominated	

=== London Film Festival Awards ===
Year	Category	Nominated work	Result	Ref(s)
2014	Best British Newcomer	Testament of Youth	Nominated	

=== National Film Awards UK ===
Year	Category	Nominated work	Result	Ref(s)
2016	Best Actor	Kingsman: The Secret Service	Nominated	
2016	Best Newcomer	Kingsman: The Secret Service	Won	
2018	Best Actor	Kingsman: The Golden Circle	Nominated	
2021	Best Actor	Rocketman	Nominated	
2021	Outstanding Performance	Rocketman	Nominated	

=== NME Awards ===
Year	Category	Nominated work	Result	Ref(s)
2020	Best Film Actor	—N/a	Nominated	

=== People's Choice Awards ===
Year	Category	Nominated work	Result	Ref(s)
2019	Drama Movie Star of the Year	Rocketman	Nominated	

=== Santa Barbara International Film Festival Awards ===
Year	Category	Nominated work	Result	Ref(s)
2020	Virtuoso Award	Rocketman	Won	

=== Satellite Awards ===
Year	Category	Nominated work	Result	Ref(s)
2020	Best Actor in a Motion Picture – Comedy or Musical	Rocketman	Won	

=== Saturn Awards ===
Year	Category	Nominated work	Result	Ref(s)
2016	Best Actor	Kingsman: The Secret Service	Nominated	

=== Teen Choice Awards ===
Year	Category	Nominated work	Result	Ref(s)
2015	Choice Movie: Breakout Star	Kingsman: The Secret Service	Nominated	
2016	Choice Movie Actor: Drama	Eddie the Eagle	Nominated	
2019	Choice Movie Actor: Drama	Rocketman	Nominated	

== Critics associations ==
Year	Association	Category	Work	Result	Ref(s)
2019	Dublin Film Critics' Circle	Best Actor	Rocketman	Nominated	
2019	Florida Film Critics Circle	Best Actor	Rocketman	Nominated	
2019	Hollywood Critics Association (Midseason Awards)	Best Actor	Rocketman	Won	
2019	New York Film Critics Online	Best Use of Music (Note: Shared with Elton John, Matthew Margeson, Giles Martin, and Bernie Taupin)	Rocketman	Won	
2020	Hollywood Critics Association (Film Awards)	Best Actor	Rocketman	Nominated	
2020	London Film Critics' Circle	British/Irish Actor of the Year	Rocketman	Nominated	
2023	Hollywood Critics Association (Midseason Awards)	Best Actor	Tetris	Nominated	
2024	Hollywood Creative Alliance (Television Awards)	Best Actor in a Limited Series or Streaming Movie	Black Bird	Nominated	
