= Elton John One Night Only – The Greatest Hits =

Live album by Elton John
- Released: 13 November 2000
- Recorded: 20 and 21 October 2000
- Venue: Madison Square Garden (New York City)
- Studio: Right Track Recording (New York City, New York)
- Genre: Rock
- Length: 68:18
- Label: Universal, Rocket, Mercury
- Producer: Phil Ramone

Elton John chronology
The Road to El Dorado (2000)	Elton John One Night Only – The Greatest Hits (2000)	Songs from the West Coast (2001)

Professional ratings
Review scores
Source	Rating
AllMusic	3/5 stars
The Encyclopedia of Popular Music	3/5 stars

Elton John One Night Only – The Greatest Hits is a live album released by British musician Elton John in 2000. The album was recorded on 20 and 21 October 2000 at Madison Square Garden during his Medusa Tour. An extended version was also released as a DVD, entitled One Night Only: The Greatest Hits Live at Madison Square Garden. While the album is called One Night Only, it was in fact recorded over two nights. Due to technical issues on the first night, most of the recordings were drawn from the second show. In the US, it was certified gold in July 2001 by the RIAA.

== Track listing ==
=== CD release ===
All compositions by Elton John and Bernie Taupin, except as indicated.

1. "Goodbye Yellow Brick Road" – 3:18
2. "Philadelphia Freedom" – 5:21
3. "Don't Go Breaking My Heart" – 4:19 (Credited to Ann Orson and Carte Blanche, pseudonyms for Elton John and Bernie Taupin)
  - With Kiki Dee
4. "Rocket Man (I Think it's Gonna be a Long, Long Time)" – 5:43
5. "Crocodile Rock" – 4:13
6. "Sacrifice" – 5:20
7. "Can You Feel the Love Tonight" – 3:59 (Elton John/Tim Rice)
8. "Bennie and the Jets" – 5:02
9. "Your Song" – 4:17
  - With Ronan Keating
10. "Sad Songs (Say So Much)" – 3:54
  - With Bryan Adams
11. "Candle in the Wind" – 3:45
12. "Saturday Night's Alright for Fighting" – 4:38
  - With Anastacia
13. "I'm Still Standing" – 3:04
14. "Don't Let the Sun Go Down on Me" – 5:59
15. "I Guess That's Why They Call It the Blues" – 5:10 (John/Davey Johnstone/Taupin)
  - With Mary J. Blige

=== DVD release ===
1. "Funeral for a Friend/Love Lies Bleeding"
2. "Candle in the Wind"
3. "Bennie and the Jets"
4. "Goodbye Yellow Brick Road" (with Billy Joel)
5. "Someone Saved My Life Tonight"
6. "Little Jeannie"
7. "Philadelphia Freedom"
8. "Tiny Dancer"
9. "Can You Feel the Love Tonight"
10. "Daniel"
11. "Rocket Man"
12. "Club at the End of the Street"
13. "Blue Eyes"
14. "I Guess That's Why They Call It the Blues" (with Mary J. Blige)
15. "The One"
16. "I Don't Wanna Go on with You Like That"
17. "Sorry Seems to Be the Hardest Word"
18. "Sacrifice"
19. "Come Together"
20. "Your Song" (with Ronan Keating)
21. "Sad Songs (Say So Much)" (with Bryan Adams)
22. "I'm Still Standing"
23. "Crocodile Rock"
24. "Saturday Night's Alright for Fighting" (with Anastacia)
25. "The Bitch is Back"
26. "Don't Let the Sun Go Down on Me"
27. "Don't Go Breaking My Heart" (with Kiki Dee)

==== Extras ====
1. "I Want Love" (video featuring Robert Downey Jr.)
2. "This Train Don't Stop There Anymore" (video featuring Justin Timberlake)
3. "Original Sin" (video featuring Mandy Moore & Elizabeth Taylor)
4. "Sorry Seems to Be the Hardest Word" (video featuring Blue)
5. "Original Sin" (Dan-O-Rama video remix)

Notes

- The performances of "Goodbye Yellow Brick Road" and "Don't Go Breaking My Heart" found on the DVD are different to those included on the CD release; most obviously, "Goodbye Yellow Brick Road" is sung as a duet with Billy Joel on the DVD, whereas on the CD John performs the song alone.

== Personnel ==
- Elton John – lead vocals, acoustic piano
- Guy Babylon – keyboards
- Davey Johnstone – guitars, vocals, musical director
- John Jorgenson – guitars, vocals
- Bob Birch – bass, vocals
- Nigel Olsson – drums, percussion, vocals
- Curt Bisquera – drums
- John Mahon – percussion, vocals
- Ken Stacey – backing vocals
- Billy Trudel – backing vocals

== Production ==
- Phil Ramone – producer
- Jill Dell'Abate – production manager
- Todd Interland – A&R coordinator
- Derek Mackillop – A&R coordinator, management
- David LaChapelle – Elton John photography
- Peacock – design
- Keith Bradley – management
- Frank Presland – management
- Twenty-First Artists Ltd. – management company

Tour production credits

- George Hoardley – production manager
- Bob Halley – director of operations
- Connie Hillman – tour producer
- DC Parmet – tour accountant, band road manager
- Dennis McManus – stage manager
- Steve Cohen – lighting designer
- Keith Bradley – tour director
- Paul Davies – hair dresser
- Suzy Hodge – artist and band wardrobe
- Howard Rose – agency
- Jim Doyle – publishing
- Patrick Isherwood – legal

Technical credits

- Mark Wilder – mastering at Sony Music Mastering (New York, NY)
- Frank Filipetti – recording, mixing
- Eric Schilling – additional engineer
- Stan Dacus – assistant engineer
- Max Feldman – assistant engineer
- Greg Lankford – assistant engineer
- Andrew Fellus – mix assistant
- Ryan Smith – mix assistant
- Jason Stasium – mix assistant

Live recording

- Clive Franks – Front of House sound engineer
- Randy Ezratty – location recording supervisor
- Alan Richardson – monitor engineer
- Jo Ravitch – systems engineer
- Charlie Campbell – assistant audio engineer
- Steve Sich – assistant audio engineer

== Charts ==
Chart (2000–2001)	Peak position
Australian Albums (ARIA)	32
Austrian Albums (Ö3 Austria)	20
Belgian Albums (Ultratop Flanders)	48
Dutch Albums (Album Top 100)	50
German Albums (Offizielle Top 100)	21
Irish Albums (IRMA)	16
Italian Albums (FIMI)	20
Norwegian Albums (VG-lista)	14
New Zealand Albums (RMNZ)	10
Scottish Albums (OCC)	6
Swedish Albums (Sverigetopplistan)	16
Swiss Albums (Schweizer Hitparade)	12
UK Albums (OCC)	7
US Billboard 200	65

== Certifications ==
=== Album ===
Region	Certification	Certified units/sales
Australia (ARIA)	Gold	35,000^{^}
Austria (IFPI Austria)	Gold	25,000^{*}
Canada (Music Canada)	Gold	50,000^{^}
Spain (Promusicae)	Gold	50,000^{^}
Switzerland (IFPI Switzerland)	Platinum	50,000^{^}
United Kingdom (BPI)	Platinum	300,000^{^}
United States (RIAA)	Gold	500,000^{^}
^{*} Sales figures based on certification alone.^{^} Shipments figures based on certification alone.

=== Video ===
Region	Certification	Certified units/sales
Australia (ARIA)	4× Platinum	60,000^{^}
^{^} Shipments figures based on certification alone.
