= Remixed (EP) =

EP by Elton John
- Released: 30 December 2003
- Length: 27:07
- Label: Rocket
- Producer: Thom Bell; Gus Dudgeon; Greg Penny; Peter Plate; Ulf Leo Sommer; Elton John; Clive Franks; Bruce Forest; Andy Whitmore

Elton John chronology
Greatest Hits 1970–2002 (2002)	Remixed (2003)	Peachtree Road (2004)

Remixed is an extended play by British musician Elton John. It was released on 30 December 2003 through the Rocket Record Company, his own label. Included is an edited version of "Are You Ready for Love" which was a number one hit on the UK singles chart in 2003.

== Overview ==
Remixed features five alternate versions of some of Elton John's most popular songs. Both edited and extended versions of "Are You Ready for Love" (originally from 1979's The Thom Bell Sessions) are included. The version of "Candle in the Wind" included consists only of the guitar and vocals from the original track. "Rocket Man '03" comes from a promotional 12" single and is also known as the "Hani Mix". The remix of "Song for Guy" dates back to the CD single for "The Last Song" (1992).

== Reception ==
Reviewing the EP for AllMusic, Lindsay Planer declared the acoustic mix of "Candle in the Wind" to be the "centerpiece" of the release, saying the stripped-back approach "creates a thoroughly fresh listening experience, capturing a purity of spirit and organic quality that the original arrangement either lacked or, at the very least, was obscured by the other more pervasive instrumentation."

== Track listing ==
Remixed
No.	Title	Writer(s)	Producer(s)	Length
1.	"Are You Ready for Love" ('79 Radio Edit)	Thom Bell; LeRoy Bell; Casey James	Thom Bell	3:30
2.	"Are You Ready for Love" (Ashley Beedle's Love and Protection Mono Edit)	T. Bell; L. Bell; James	T. Bell	7:16
3.	"Candle in the Wind" (Acoustic Mix)	Elton John; Bernie Taupin	Gus Dudgeon; Greg Penny	3:51
4.	"Rocket Man '03"	John; Taupin	Peter Plate; Ulf Leo Sommer	4:00
5.	"Song for Guy" (Remix)	John	John; Clive Franks; Bruce Forest; Andy Whitmore	8:28
Total length:				27:07

Note: On the remix of "Song for Guy", Bruce Forest and Andy Whitmore are credited for remixing and additional production dating back to 1992.
