= Original Sin (Elton John song) =

Single by Elton John

from the album Songs from the West Coast
- Released: 1 April 2002
- Genre: Rock / Pop
- Length: 4:49
- Label: Rocket, Mercury, Universal
- Songwriters: Elton John, Bernie Taupin
- Producer: Patrick Leonard

Elton John singles chronology
"This Train Don't Stop There Anymore" (2002)	"Original Sin" (2002)	"Your Song" (2002)

Music video
- "Original Sin" on YouTube

"Original Sin" is a song by British musician Elton John and lyricist Bernie Taupin from John's twenty-sixth studio album Songs from the West Coast, released in 2002 as the album's third and final single.

"Original Sin" is a slow song with a sweet and melancholy melody focused on Elton's piano playing and featuring Rusty Anderson on guitars and producer Patrick Leonard on keyboards. The orchestral arrangement is by Paul Buckmaster.

The song is believed to have been written about the failed marriage between John and his ex-wife Renate Blauel, and is the second song about their marriage after "Blue Avenue" on his 1989 album Sleeping with the Past. The singer implies the relationship as an original sin because even though he loved his wife very much, he wasn't being true to himself and his attractions. As John stated on his marriage to Blauel, "She was the classiest woman I’ve ever met, but it wasn’t meant to be. I was living a lie."

== Chart performance ==
Released in 2002 (on a promo-only basis in the United States), the single had limited commercial success; it reached #39 in the UK and #18 in the US adult contemporary music chart.

== Performances ==
John performed "Original Sin" on various locations, and he stated in a 2009 concert on Palais des Congrés, Paris, France, with Ray Cooper, that the song was the most requested song by his fans, who asked him to perform it through letters.

== Music video ==
Directed by David LaChapelle, the music video stars Mandy Moore and Elizabeth Taylor. The storyline of the video talks about a lonely girl who daydreams about seeing John in concert during the 1970s, where she meets an array of celebrities from that era.

== Track listing ==
CD Single (UK, including the video for This Train Don't Stop There Anymore)

1. "Original Sin" – 4:49
2. "I'm Still Standing" (live) – 3:20
3. "This Train Don't Stop There Anymore" (live) – 4:24

CD Single (UK, including the video for This Train Don't Stop There Anymore)

1. "Original Sin" – 4:49
2. "Original Sin" (live) – 4:54
3. "All the Girls Love Alice" (live) – 4:55

Maxi single 12" (USA)

1. "Original Sin" (Junior's Earth Mix) – 10:35
2. "Original Sin" (Junior's Earthbeats) – 5:28
3. "Original Sin" (Junior's Earthdub) – 6:45
4. "Original Sin" (Junior's Earthstrumental) – 10:35

== Awards ==
Grammy Awards

Year	Nominee / work	Award	Result
2003	"Original Sin"	Best Pop Vocal Performance – Male	Nominated

== Charts ==
Chart performance for "Original Sin"
Chart (2002)	Peak position
Australia (ARIA)	54
UK Singles (Official Charts)	39
US Adult Contemporary (Billboard)	18
