= Songs from the West Coast =

Studio album by Elton John
- Released: 1 October 2001
- Recorded: 18 September 2000 – 30 April 2001
- Studio: The Townhouse (London, England); Cello Studios, Sony Music, Johnny Yuma, Wonderland, Ocean Way Studios (Los Angeles, California)
- Genre: Pop rock
- Length: 54:06
- Label: Rocket; Mercury
- Producer: Patrick Leonard

Elton John chronology
Elton John One Night Only – The Greatest Hits (2000)	Songs from the West Coast (2001)	Greatest Hits 1970–2002 (2002)

Singles from Songs from the West Coast
- 1. "I Want Love" Released: 24 September 2001; 2. "This Train Don't Stop There Anymore" Released: 2002; 3. "Original Sin" Released: 1 April 2002

Songs from the West Coast is the twenty-sixth studio album by British musician Elton John, released worldwide on 1 October 2001.

== Background ==
For this album, Elton John once again collaborated with long-time lyricist Bernie Taupin. Patrick Leonard produced the album and played keyboards on several songs, as was the case for The Road to El Dorado soundtrack, released the year before.

Drummer Nigel Olsson returned to the Elton John Band full-time and Tata Vega makes an early appearance as a backup vocalist, joining the band later. Stevie Wonder, who previously worked with John on the songs "I Guess That's Why They Call It the Blues" and "That's What Friends Are For", played harmonica and clavinet on "Dark Diamond". Guy Babylon, Bob Birch and John Mahon, three of John's band members at the time, do not appear on this album.

It was the first non-soundtrack studio album from John to be released after PolyGram and Universal Music Group merged, consolidating distribution rights to his entire catalogue.

Rufus Wainwright sings backing vocals on the track "American Triangle", which is about Matthew Shepard, a gay college student who was murdered in 1998. The album was dedicated to Shepard and Oliver Johnstone, band member Davey Johnstone's late son.

John has said that the inspiration for many of the songs on this album came from when he listened to Heartbreaker by Ryan Adams.

In an interview with Jon Wiederhorn in 2001, John revealed that the album was recorded using analogue tape, as he believes "the voice and instruments sound warmer".

In 2002, the album was repackaged as a special edition containing a bonus disc with remixes, B-sides and non-album singles from the time of its release.

== Singles ==
"I Want Love" was the first single to be released from the album, later going on to be nominated for a Grammy Award for Best Male Pop Vocal Performance at the 44th Annual Grammy Awards. It reached No. 9 in the UK Singles Chart, No. 10 on the US Billboard Bubbling Under chart and No. 6 on the Adult Contemporary chart. It reached No. 9 in Canada. "This Train Don't Stop There Anymore" and "Original Sin" also became hit singles. "Original Sin" also received a Grammy nomination for Best Male Pop Vocal Performance at the 45th Annual Grammy Awards. None of the songs from this album hit the Billboard Hot 100 in the United States, which froze John's record of 31 years with at least one song in the Billboard Hot 100 (30 with at least one in the top 40).

=== Music videos ===
The music video for the song "I Want Love" was directed by Sam Taylor-Wood and features actor Robert Downey Jr. lip-synching to the song. He is the only person to appear in the video. The entire video is one long shot where the camera follows Downey from room to room of a large empty house (Greystone Mansion).

The music video for the song "This Train Don't Stop There Anymore" features Justin Timberlake portraying a young John.

The music video for the song "Original Sin" features Elizabeth Taylor and Mandy Moore. It also features John playing the father of Moore's character and the husband of Taylor's character. Moore was the centre of the video, who plays a huge Elton John fan from the 1970s who is transported by a dream (à la The Wizard of Oz) to one of his concerts, where she socialises with various celebrities of the period (Bette Midler, Sonny & Cher, Barbra Streisand, etc.) played by look-alikes. Then at the end she wakes up and John's character asks, "Who is this Elton John, anyway?" It also has more of an upbeat dance mix to the music.

== Album cover ==
Photographed by Sam Taylor-Wood, the restaurant shown on the album's cover is Rae's Restaurant, which is frequently used as a location for many Los Angeles-based film shoots, including 1993's True Romance and 2005's Lords of Dogtown. John's partner David Furnish and his Director of Operations Bob Halley appear on the album cover: Furnish as a cowboy at the bar and Halley as the man getting handcuffed.

== Critical reception ==
Professional ratings
Review scores
Source	Rating
The Advocate	favourable
AllMusic	4/5 stars
The Encyclopedia of Popular Music	4/5 stars
Entertainment Weekly	A−
The Guardian	4/5 stars
Jam!	favourable
Los Angeles Times	positive
People	favourable
Rolling Stone	4/5 stars
BBC	favourable

For the most part, Songs from the West Coast was warmly received by music critics. AllMusic's Stephen Thomas Erlewine was glad that John made a record that sounds like his classic albums from the early 1970s, even though he still included some adult contemporary material. Erlewine went on to say that the record does not have all the "warmth" of his classic albums, but that it is still the best album he has made in years. Ken Tucker of Entertainment Weekly stated that the album effectively sounds like John's early recordings. He felt that Taupin's lyrics, such as "American Triangle", devalue the song, but at other times make John "liberated". Jane Stevenson, writing for Jam! CANOE, felt glad that John returned to his roots, even if he does not quite make it there. Barry Walters of Rolling Stone wrote that back-to-the-roots albums by artists rarely work, but John was able to make it work on Songs from the West Coast even if some songs, such as "American Triangle" and "The Emperor's New Clothes", miss the mark. Others, like "I Want Love", effectively manage to sound like his earlier work.

== Track listing ==
All songs written by Elton John and Bernie Taupin.

Songs from the West Coast track listing
No.	Title	Length
1.	"The Emperor's New Clothes"	4:28
2.	"Dark Diamond"	4:26
3.	"Look Ma, No Hands"	4:22
4.	"American Triangle"	4:49
5.	"Original Sin"	4:49
6.	"Birds"	3:51
7.	"I Want Love"	4:35
8.	"The Wasteland"	4:21
9.	"Ballad of the Boy in the Red Shoes"	4:52
10.	"Love Her Like Me"	3:58
11.	"Mansfield"	4:56
12.	"This Train Don't Stop There Anymore"	4:39

2002 reissue bonus disc track listing
No.	Title	Length
1.	"Your Song" (with Alessandro Safina)	4:21
2.	"Teardrops" (with Lulu)	4:45
3.	"The North Star"	5:29
4.	"Original Sin" (Junior's Earth mix)	3:52
5.	"Your Song" (with Alessandro Safina; Almighty mix)	4:33
6.	"I Want Love" (video)
7.	"This Train Don't Stop There Anymore" (video)
8.	"Your Song" (video)

== Personnel ==
=== Musicians ===
- Elton John – vocals, acoustic piano, harmonium (6)
- Patrick Leonard – Hammond B3 organ (2, 4), organ (3), keyboards (4, 5, 11), Mellotron (10)
- Stevie Wonder – clavinet (2), harmonica (2)
- Billy Preston – electric organ (7), Hammond B3 organ (8, 10)
- Davey Johnstone – guitars (1, 2, 8), backing vocals (1–3, 7, 9–12), electric guitar (3, 7), acoustic guitar (9, 11), mandolin (9)
- David Channing – acoustic guitar (3), dobro (6)
- Rusty Anderson – electric guitar (4, 11), guitars (5, 6, 10), bouzouki (11)
- Bruce Gaitsch – acoustic guitar (4, 7)
- Paul Bushnell – bass (1–12), backing vocals (1–3, 7, 9–12)
- Nigel Olsson – drums (1, 3, 7–9), backing vocals (1–3, 7, 9–12)
- Matt Chamberlain – drums (2, 4–6, 10–12), percussion (6)
- Jay Bellerose – percussion (1, 3, 5, 7, 9)
- Paul Buckmaster – horn arrangements and conductor (1), string arrangements and conductor (5, 9, 11, 12)
- Rufus Wainwright – harmony vocals (4)
- Kudisan Kai – backing vocals (7, 8, 12)
- Tata Vega – backing vocals (8)
- Gary Barlow – backing vocals (12)

=== Production ===
- Patrick Leonard – producer
- Greg Penny – producer ("Teardrops" with Lulu)
- Marie Flemmings – production assistant
- Todd Interland – A&R coordinator
- Derek Mackillop – A&R coordinator, management
- Adrian Collee – project coordinator
- Katrina Leigh – project coordinator
- Suzanne Ybarra – project coordinator
- Peacock – design
- Sam Taylor-Wood – photography
- Versace – clothing
- Keith Bradley – management
- Frank Presland – management
- Twenty-First Artists Ltd. – management company

Technical credits

- Stephen Marcussen – mastering
- Stewart Whitmore – digital editing
- Marcussen Mastering (Hollywood, California) – editing and mastering location
- Bill Bottrell – mixing
- Brian Scheuble – recording
- David Channing – recording, vocal recording for Rufus Wainwright (4)
- Joe Chiccarelli – recording, vocal recording for Elton John, horn recording (1), string recording (5, 9, 11, 12)
- Ralph Sutton – recording for Stevie Wonder (2)
- Alan Sanderson – mix assistant, recording assistant, horn recording assistant (1), string recording assistant (5, 9, 11, 12)
- Jennifer Hilliard – recording assistant
- Katrina Leigh – recording assistant
- Jonathan Merritt – recording assistant
- Todd Shoemaker – recording assistant
- Andy Green – vocal recording assistant for Elton John
- Tom Stanley – vocal recording assistant for Elton John
- Steve Jones – recording assistant for Stevie Wonder (2)
- Darrell Thorp – recording assistant for Rufus Wainwright (4)

== Accolades ==
Grammy Award nominations for Songs from the West Coast
Year	Nominee / work	Award	Result
2002	"I Want Love"	Best Pop Vocal Album	Nominated
2003	"Original Sin"	Best Pop Vocal Performance – Male	Nominated

== Charts ==
=== Weekly charts ===
Weekly chart performance for Songs from the West Coast
Chart (2001–2002)	Peak position
Australian Albums (ARIA)	7
Austrian Albums (Ö3 Austria)	15
Canadian Albums (Billboard)	9
Danish Albums (Hitlisten)	10
Dutch Albums (Album Top 100)	13
Finnish Albums (Suomen virallinen lista)	22
French Albums (SNEP)	19
German Albums (Offizielle Top 100)	14
Hungarian Albums (MAHASZ)	33
Irish Albums (IRMA)	38
Italian Albums (FIMI)	3
Japanese Albums (Oricon)	68
New Zealand Albums (RMNZ)	24
Norwegian Albums (VG-lista)	2
Polish Albums (OLiS)	18
Scottish Albums (OCC)	2
Spanish Albums (PROMUSICAE)	21
Swedish Albums (Sverigetopplistan)	8
Swiss Albums (Schweizer Hitparade)	7
UK Albums (OCC)	2
US Billboard 200	15

=== Year-end charts ===
Year-end chart performance for Songs from the West Coast
Chart (2001)	Position
Canadian Albums (Nielsen SoundScan)	174
UK Albums (OCC)	34

== Certifications and sales ==
Certifications and sales for Songs from the West Coast
Region	Certification	Certified units/sales
Australia (ARIA)	Gold	35,000^{^}
Canada (Music Canada)	Gold	50,000^{^}
Denmark (IFPI Danmark)	Platinum	50,000^{^}
Italy (FIMI)	Platinum	100,000^{*}
Norway (IFPI Norway)	Gold	25,000^{*}
Sweden (GLF)	Gold	40,000^{^}
Switzerland (IFPI Switzerland)	Gold	20,000^{^}
United Kingdom (BPI)	2× Platinum	600,000^{^}
United States (RIAA)	Gold	500,000
Summaries
Europe (IFPI)	Platinum	1,000,000^{*}
^{*} Sales figures based on certification alone.^{^} Shipments figures based on certification alone.
