= Rocketman: Music from the Motion Picture =

Soundtrack album by Taron Egerton
- Released: 24 May 2019
- Genre: Pop rock
- Length: 72:52
- Label: Virgin EMI; Interscope
- Producer: Giles Martin; Greg Kurstin

Elton John chronology
Live from Moscow 1979 (2019)	Rocketman: Music from the Motion Picture (2019)	The Lion King (2019)

Rocketman: Music from the Motion Picture is a soundtrack album released by Virgin EMI (UK) and Interscope Records (US) on CD and digital formats on 24 May 2019 and is the official soundtrack album to the 2019 biographical musical film of British musician Elton John entitled Rocketman. The album contains 22 tracks of several hits performed by the cast of the film and a newly written track "(I'm Gonna) Love Me Again" featuring vocals by Taron Egerton and John together. This is the only song featuring John. The song won the 2019 Golden Globe Award for Best Original Song & the 2020 Academy Award for Best Original Song. The soundtrack was also released by Interscope Records on vinyl on 23 August 2019.

== Commercial success ==
On 7 June 2019, the album entered the Billboard 200 at number 58 and at number 6 on the Billboard Soundtracks chart. In its second week, the soundtrack moved to number 50 with 12,000 album-equivalent units.

== Track listing ==
All tracks are written by Elton John and Bernie Taupin, except where noted.

No.	Title	Performers	Length
1.	"The Bitch Is Back" (introduction)	Taron Egerton; Sebastian Rich	1:53
2.	"I Want Love"	Kit Connor; Gemma Jones; Bryce Dallas Howard; Steven Mackintosh	2:13
3.	"Saturday Night's Alright (For Fighting)"	Egerton; Connor	3:10
4.	"Thank You for All Your Loving" (Elton John and Caleb Quaye)	Egerton	3:24
5.	"Border Song"	Egerton	3:25
6.	"Rock and Roll Madonna" (interlude)	Egerton	2:42
7.	"Your Song"	Egerton	4:01
8.	"Amoreena"	Egerton	4:20
9.	"Crocodile Rock"	Egerton	2:53
10.	"Tiny Dancer"	Egerton	5:25
11.	"Take Me to the Pilot"	Egerton	3:43
12.	"Hercules"	Egerton	5:26
13.	"Don't Go Breaking My Heart" (interlude)	Egerton; Rachel Muldoon	1:34
14.	"Honky Cat"	Egerton; Richard Madden	2:34
15.	"Pinball Wizard" (interlude) (Pete Townshend)	Egerton	2:02
16.	"Rocket Man"	Egerton	4:31
17.	"Bennie and the Jets (interlude)"	Egerton	2:28
18.	"Don't Let the Sun Go Down on Me"	Egerton; Celinde Schoenmaker	2:40
19.	"Sorry Seems to Be the Hardest Word"	Egerton	2:15
20.	"Goodbye Yellow Brick Road"	Egerton; Jamie Bell	4:05
21.	"I'm Still Standing"	Egerton	3:58
22.	"(I'm Gonna) Love Me Again"	Egerton; John	4:11
Total length:			72:52

Japanese edition / Target exclusive bonus tracks
No.	Title	Performers	Length
23.	"Don't Let the Sun Go Down on Me" (Taron only version)	Egerton	5:25
24.	"Breakin' Down the Walls of Heartache"	Jason Pennycooke; Alexia Khadime	2:49
Total length:			81:06

== Personnel ==
- Giles Martin – production (all tracks)
- Greg Kurstin – production (track 22)
- Elton John – executive production; vocals (track 22)
- Matthew Vaughn – executive production
- David Furnish – executive production
- Dexter Fletcher – executive production
- Taron Egerton – vocals (tracks 1, 3–22)
- Kit Connor – vocals (tracks 2, 3)
- Sebastian Rich – vocals (track 1)
- Gemma Jones – vocals (track 2)
- Bryce Dallas Howard – vocals (track 2)
- Steven Mackintosh – vocals (track 2)
- Rachel Muldoon – vocals (track 13)
- Richard Madden – vocals (track 14)
- Celinde Schoenmaker – vocals (track 18)
- Jamie Bell – vocals (track 20)
- Ron Blake - trumpet (track 22)

== Charts ==
=== Weekly charts ===
Chart (2019)	Peak position
Australian Albums (ARIA)	6
Austrian Albums (Ö3 Austria)	38
Belgian Albums (Ultratop Flanders)	46
Belgian Albums (Ultratop Wallonia)	42
Dutch Albums (Album Top 100)	81
French Albums (SNEP)	55
German Albums (Offizielle Top 100)	67
Irish Albums (OCC)	14
Italian Albums (FIMI)	80
Japan Hot Albums (Billboard Japan)	49
Japanese Albums (Oricon)	43
New Zealand Albums (RMNZ)	9
Portuguese Albums (AFP)	40
Scottish Albums (OCC)	5
Spanish Albums (Promusicae)	28
Swiss Albums (Schweizer Hitparade)	32
UK Albums (OCC)	5
UK Compilation Albums (OCC)	24
UK Album Downloads (OCC)	2
UK Soundtrack Albums (OCC)	1
US Billboard 200	50
US Top Rock Albums (Billboard)	4
US Soundtrack Albums (Billboard)	6

=== Year-end charts ===
Chart (2019)	Position
Australian Albums (ARIA)	66
US Top Rock Albums (Billboard)	87

== Certifications ==
Certifications and sales for "Rocketman: Music from the Motion Picture"
Region	Certification	Certified units/sales
United Kingdom (BPI)	Gold	100,000^{‡}
^{‡} Sales+streaming figures based on certification alone.
