= (I'm Gonna) Love Me Again =

2019 single by Elton John and Taron Egerton

- Purple Disco Machine remix cover

Single by Elton John and Taron Egerton

from the album Rocketman: Music from the Motion Picture
- Released: 16 May 2019
- Recorded: 2019
- Length: 4:12
- Label: Virgin EMI; Interscope
- Composer: Elton John
- Lyricist: Bernie Taupin
- Producers: Giles Martin; Greg Kurstin

Elton John singles chronology
"A Good Heart" (2016)	"(I'm Gonna) Love Me Again" (2019)	"Never Too Late" (2019)

Taron Egerton singles chronology
"The Breach" (2015)	"(I'm Gonna) Love Me Again" (2019)

"(I'm Gonna) Love Me Again" is a song from the 2019 biopic Rocketman. Written by Elton John and Bernie Taupin, the song was performed by John and Taron Egerton, who portrayed John in the film. The song is heard in the end credits of the film. The official music video features both archival clips from John's early career as well as scenes from the film. The song won numerous accolades including "Best Original Song" at the 77th Golden Globe Awards, "Best Song" at the 25th Critics' Choice Awards, "Best Original Song" at the 24th Satellite Awards, and Best Original Song at the 92nd Academy Awards.

The song premiered on BBC Radio 2 on 16 May 2019.

== Accolades ==
Awards
Award	Category	Result
Academy Awards	Best Original Song	Won
Golden Globe Awards	Best Original Song	Won
Critics' Choice Awards	Best Song	Won
Satellite Awards	Best Original Song	Won
Hollywood Critics Association	Best Original Song	Nominated
Hollywood Music in Media Awards	Best Original Song – Feature Film	Nominated
Gold Derby Awards	Best Original Song	Won
Georgia Film Critics Association	Best Original Song	Nominated
Houston Film Critics Society	Best Original Song	Nominated
Huading Awards	Best Global Original Song	Nominated
Music City Film Critics' Association Awards	Best Song	Won
Latino Entertainment Journalists Association Awards	Best Song Written for a Motion Picture	Won
Hawaii Film Critics Society	Best Song	Won
Online Film & Television Association	Best Original Song	Won
Denver Film Critics Society	Best Original Song	Nominated
NBP Film Awards	Best Original Song	Nominated
Iowa Film Critics Awards	Best Song	Nominated
DiscussingFilm Critics Awards	Best Original Song	Nominated
International Online Cinema Awards	Best Original Song	Nominated
North Dakota Film Society	Best Original Song	Nominated

== Music video ==
The music video was directed by Kii Arens. It was uploaded to John's official Vevo account on 13 June 2019. The video features John and Egerton, with footage of Egerton as John in Rocketman, archival footage of the musician and clips of both John and Egerton recording the song in the studio. It also includes kaleidoscopic animation mixed with album artwork and concert posters from John's heyday.

The making of the music video was released on 4 July 2019 on John's Vevo account, with John and Taupin discussing the track in a behind-the-scenes video.

== Live performances ==
"(I'm Gonna) Love Me Again" was performed by John and Egerton on Paramount Pictures' Rocketman: Live in Concert at the Greek Theatre, in Los Angeles, with the Hollywood Symphony Orchestra on 17 October 2019.

John performed "(I'm Gonna) Love Me Again" at the 92nd Academy Awards on 9 February 2020 with a red Yamaha piano and full-band including backing singers in front of a screen with animated graphics to represent the film. The song won the Academy Award for Best Original Song.

== Remix ==
DJ Purple Disco Machine was responsible for a remix version of music from John and Egerton. The music was launched on download and streaming platforms on 19 December 2019. The cover of the remix was illustrated by Erin Goedtel.

== Track listing ==
Digital download

1. "(I'm Gonna) Love Me Again" (Purple Disco Machine Remix) – 3:25

== Charts ==
=== Weekly charts ===
Weekly chart performance for "(I'm Gonna) Love Me Again"
Chart (2019–2020)	Peak position
Belgium (Ultratip Bubbling Under Flanders)	32
US Adult Contemporary (Billboard)	12
US Dance Club Songs (Billboard)	3

=== Year-end charts ===
Year-end chart performance for "(I'm Gonna) Love Me Again"
Chart (2019)	Position
US Adult Contemporary (Billboard)	29

== Release history ==
Release history and formats for "(I'm Gonna) Love Me Again"
Country	Date	Format	Label	Ref.
United States	16 May 2019	Digital download; streaming	Virgin EMI; Interscope	
United Kingdom	16 May 2019	Digital download; streaming	Virgin EMI; Interscope	
