= Nikita (song) =

1985 single by Elton John

Single by Elton John

from the album Ice on Fire
- B-side: "The Man Who Never Died"; "Restless"
- Released: 4 October 1985
- Genre: Soft rock
- Length: 5:44 (album version); 4:43 (UK single version); 4:54 (single version)
- Label: Rocket
- Songwriters: Elton John; Bernie Taupin
- Producer: Gus Dudgeon

Elton John singles chronology
"That's What Friends Are For" (1985)	"Nikita" (1985)	"Wrap Her Up" (1985)

Music video
- "Nikita" on YouTube

"Nikita" is a song by British musician Elton John and lyricist Bernie Taupin, performed by John. It is from John's nineteenth studio album, Ice on Fire (1985), and was released by Rocket as its lead single on 4 October 1985, charting at number three on the UK singles chart, peaking at number seven in the United States, and reaching the top 10 worldwide, topping the charts of eight countries. The song features George Michael on backing vocals and Nik Kershaw on guitar. The accompanying music video depicts John's attempted romance of a blonde female East German border guard at a Berlin border crossing.

== Song synopsis ==
In the song, John describes his crush on a person called Nikita, an East German border guard patrolling the Berlin Wall whom he cannot meet because he is not allowed into East Germany. Though the name Nikita can refer to women in other languages, it is a male name in Russian. In interviews, John has said that he was aware of Nikita being a male name in Russian.

== Composition ==
The song is composed in the key of G major in 4/4 time. The song employs a verse-chorus-verse format, with the second chorus being shorter than the first, plus an instrumental bridge mechanically themed breakdown halfway through the second chorus.

== Reception ==
Cash Box said the "tune is as sensitive as the subject matter" and that the song has "a mesmerizing tempo, well textured production and John’s inimitable vocal style." Billboard called it a "lilting tune" and coupled it with the song "Russians" as a "proffering" of "international amity on a personal level".

== Music video ==
The video for the song was directed by Ken Russell. John accepted the proposed script written by Russell which was a male–female love interpretation of the song, depicting his attempted romance of a blonde female East German border guard at a Berlin border crossing with short hair and bright blue eyes. Scenes showed the two together in various happy situations, including wearing the colours of Watford FC, of whom John is a supporter and former chairman. The video also features a red Bentley Continental Convertible, which was owned by John from 1985 to 2000.

Anya Major plays the role of Nikita; Andreas Wisniewski plays a male border guard who appears to be her commanding officer.

== Live performances ==
John played "Nikita" during the album's tour in 1985 to 1986, and again in the 1988–1989 Reg Strikes Back Tour, plus the 1998 leg of The Big Picture Tour. He continued to perform the song in the mid-2000s.

== Allegation of plagiarism ==
Elton John, Bernie Taupin and Big Pig Music were accused of plagiarism by South African photographer and songwriter Guy Hobbs. Hobbs wrote a song in 1982 entitled "Natasha", about a Russian waitress on a cruise ship, who was never allowed to leave it. The song was copyrighted in 1983, and sent to Big Pig Music (John's publisher) for a possible publishing deal, but Hobbs never heard back from the publisher. In 2001, Hobbs came across the lyric book to "Nikita" and noticed similarities with his song. Despite repeated attempts by Hobbs to contact John over the issue, he never heard from him and so commenced legal action in 2012.

On 31 October 2012, a US federal judge granted John and Taupin's motion to dismiss, finding that the song did not infringe Hobbs' copyright because the only similar elements were generic images and themes that are not protected under copyright law.

== Track listings ==
- 7-inch single
1. "Nikita" – 4:54
2. "The Man Who Never Died" – 5:10

or "Restless" – 4:26
or "I'm Still Standing" – 3:03
or "Don't Let the Sun Go Down on Me" – 6:12

- 12-inch maxi single
1. "Nikita" (album version) – 5:43
2. "The Man Who Never Died" – 5:10
3. "Sorry Seems to Be the Hardest Word" (live) – 3:26
4. "I'm Still Standing" (live) – 4:38

== Personnel ==
- Elton John – lead vocals, backing vocals, Yamaha GS1 piano, synthesizer
- Fred Mandel – synthesizers
- Nik Kershaw – electric guitar
- David Paton – bass
- Dave Mattacks – drums, percussion
- Davey Johnstone – backing vocals
- George Michael – backing vocals

== Charts ==
=== Weekly charts ===
Weekly chart performance for "Nikita"
Chart (1985–1986)	Peak position
Australia (Kent Music Report)	3
Austria (Ö3 Austria Top 40)	3
Belgium (Ultratop 50 Flanders)	1
Canada Retail Singles (The Record)	1
Canada Top Singles (RPM)	2
Canada Adult Contemporary (RPM)	1
Europe (European Hot 100 Singles)	2
France (SNEP)	6
Ireland (IRMA)	1
Luxembourg (Radio Luxembourg)	1
Netherlands (Dutch Top 40)	1
Netherlands (Single Top 100)	1
New Zealand (Recorded Music NZ)	1
Norway (VG-lista)	2
Portugal (AFP)	1
South Africa (Springbok Radio)	1
Spain (AFYVE)	5
Sweden (Sverigetopplistan)	7
Switzerland (Schweizer Hitparade)	1
UK Singles (Official Charts)	3
US Billboard Hot 100	7
US Adult Contemporary (Billboard)	3
US Cash Box Top 100	9
West Germany (GfK)	1
Zimbabwe (ZIMA)	1

Chart (2021)	Peak position
Bolivia (Monitor Latino)	7

=== Year-end charts ===
1985 year-end chart performance for "Nikita"
Chart (1985)	Position
Australia (Kent Music Report)	71
Belgium (Ultratop 50 Flanders)	53
Netherlands (Dutch Top 40)	67
Netherlands (Single Top 100)	10
UK Singles (OCC)	28

1986 year-end chart performance for "Nikita"
Chart (1986)	Position
Austria (Ö3 Austria Top 40)	7
Belgium (Ultratop 50 Flanders)	9
Brazil (Crowley)	9
Canada Top Singles (RPM)	12
Europe (European Hot 100 Singles)	19
Netherlands (Dutch Top 40)	15
Netherlands (Single Top 100)	30
New Zealand (RIANZ)	8
South Africa (Springbok Radio)	7
Switzerland (Schweizer Hitparade)	6
US Billboard Hot 100	87
US Adult Contemporary (Billboard)	17
US Cash Box Top 100	85
West Germany (Media Control)	12

== Certifications ==
Certifications for "Nikita"
Region	Certification	Certified units/sales
Austria (IFPI Austria)	Gold	50,000^{*}
Belgium (BRMA)	Gold	100,000
Brazil (Pro-Música Brasil)	Gold	30,000^{‡}
Denmark (IFPI Danmark)	Gold	45,000^{‡}
France (SNEP)	Silver	250,000^{*}
Netherlands (NVPI)	2× Platinum	200,000^{^}
New Zealand (RMNZ)	Platinum	30,000^{‡}
Poland (ZPAV)	Platinum	20,000^{*}
Switzerland (IFPI Switzerland)	Gold	25,000^{^}
United Kingdom (BPI)	Silver	250,000^{^}
^{*} Sales figures based on certification alone.^{^} Shipments figures based on certification alone.^{‡} Sales+streaming figures based on certification alone.
