= Song for Guy =

Single by Elton John

from the album A Single Man
- B-side: "Lovesick"
- Released: 1 December 1978
- Recorded: August 1978
- Genre: Pop
- Length: 5:02 (single); 6:34 (album); 8:29 (2003 remix)
- Label: MCA; Rocket
- Songwriter: Elton John

Elton John singles chronology
"Part-Time Love" (1978)	"Song for Guy" (1978)	"Return to Paradise" (1978)

"Song for Guy" is a mainly instrumental piece of music by British musician Elton John. It is the closing track of his 1978 album A Single Man.

== Musical structure ==
As I was writing this song one Sunday, I imagined myself floating into space and looking down at my own body. I was imagining myself dying. Morbidly obsessed with these thoughts, I wrote this song about death. The next day I was told that Guy [Burchett], our 17-year-old messenger boy, had been tragically killed on his motorcycle the day before. Guy died on the day I wrote this song.

— Elton John, from the sleeve notes of the 7-inch single.

"Song for Guy" opens with piano (which is mostly overdubbed an octave higher throughout the song), which is then accompanied by a looped Roland CR-78 drum machine, with occasional shaker and wind chimes alternating; other keyboards are often layered in shortly after, with a bass guitar mainly accompanying this. It is instrumental until the end, in which the words "Life isn't everything" are repeated.

"Song for Guy" stands as one of the few pieces written by John alone and the only instrumental he made and released as a single. His subsequent instrumentals were released only as B-sides, notably "Choc Ice Goes Mental" (A-sides: "I Guess That's Why They Call It the Blues" and "Kiss the Bride") and "The Man Who Never Died" (A-sides: "Nikita" and "The Last Song").

== Reception ==
"Song for Guy" was successful in the UK, peaking at No. 4 in January 1979, and remaining on the chart for ten weeks. It marked his return to the Top Ten for the first time since 1976's "Don't Go Breaking My Heart", which reached No. 1 on the same chart. The single was not released in the US until March 1979 where it barely made the charts, peaking at No. 110. It was a modest success, though, on the American adult contemporary charts, where it reached No. 37 in the spring of 1979.

Cash Box wrote that "Song for Guy" had "an alluring beauty", with "spunky piano chording, rhythm ace backing, evocative synthesizer explorations and chimes". Record World said it would surprise his fans as "an instrumental with traditional orchestral arrangements and John's own semi-classical piano work".

== Use in media ==
"Song for Guy" was used extensively throughout all six episodes of the 1985 BBC comedy series Happy Families (the lead male character is named Guy). It is also used in the seventh episode of Diamonds in the Sky (1979), a BBC–Channel 9 Perth co-production about the history of commercial aviation, and is played frequently in the 1980 movie Oh Heavenly Dog starring Chevy Chase and Jane Seymour and directed by Rod Browning. The song also features prominently in the 2017 film Film Stars Don't Die in Liverpool. In November 2020, the track was featured in The Crown, during a scene in which Lady Diana Spencer dances alone in a Buckingham Palace ballroom. It was also used for the German weekly show "Sport unter der Lupe" (Sports under the magnifying glass), a show about the regional sport in the south west of Germany, from 1979 till the end in 2000.

== Personnel ==
- Elton John – piano, Mellotron, Polymoog, ARP String Ensemble, vocals
- Ray Cooper – wind chimes, shakers
- Clive Franks – bass

== Charts ==
=== Weekly charts ===
Chart (1978–1979)	Peak position
Australia (Kent Music Report)	14
Belgium (Ultratop 50 Flanders)	9
Netherlands (Dutch Top 40)	6
Netherlands (Single Top 100)	11
New Zealand (Recorded Music NZ)	7
UK Singles (Official Charts)	4
US Adult Contemporary (Billboard)	37
West Germany (GfK)	22
Zimbabwe (ZIMA)	20

=== Year-end charts ===
Chart (1979)	Position
Australia (Kent Music Report)	71
Belgium (Ultratop Flanders)	78
Netherlands (Dutch Top 40)	65
Netherlands (Single Top 100)	93
