= This Train Don't Stop There Anymore =

2001 single by Elton John

Single by Elton John

from the album Songs from the West Coast
- B-side: "Did Anybody Sleep with Joan of Arc"
- Released: 2001
- Length: 4:37
- Label: Rocket; Mercury
- Songwriters: Elton John; Bernie Taupin
- Producer: Patrick Leonard

Elton John singles chronology
"I Want Love" (2001)	"This Train Don't Stop There Anymore" (2001)	"Original Sin" (2002)

Music video
- "This Train Don't Stop There Anymore" on YouTube

"This Train Don't Stop There Anymore" is a song written by British musician Elton John and lyricist Bernie Taupin, performed by John. It is from John's 2001 album Songs from the West Coast. The song's lyrics detail his fame being over and his coming to terms with getting older but still touring and performing around the world. It was released as the second single from the album, reaching No. 24 on the UK singles chart, No. 10 on the US Billboard Adult Contemporary chart, and No. 83 in the Netherlands.

The arrangement of the song was simple, a throwback to John's early piano-bass-drums combination prior to the arrival of guitarist Davey Johnstone to his band. John played this song and "American Triangle" on his concerts months before the album's release and at the Songs from the West Coast Tour in 2001–2002. After the tour ended, he performed this song in various locations until 2004.

== Music video ==
The music video, directed by David LaChapelle with Pierre Rouger as cinematographer, presents a younger John played by Justin Timberlake dressed in outfits typical of John in the 1970s; the video also features Paul Reubens of Pee-wee Herman fame as John Reid, John's manager of 25 years.

== Personnel ==
- Elton John – piano, vocals
- Paul Bushnell – bass, backing vocals
- Matt Chamberlain – drums
- Gary Barlow – backing vocals
- Nigel Olsson – backing vocals
- Paul Buckmaster – string arrangements

== Track listings ==
UK CD1

1. "This Train Don't Stop There Anymore" – 4:39
2. "Did Anybody Sleep with Joan of Arc" – 4:18
3. "I Want Love" (live) – 4:34

UK CD2

1. "This Train Don't Stop There Anymore" – 4:39
2. "American Triangle" (live) – 4:35
3. "Philadelphia Freedom" (live) – 5:08

Alternative version

1. "This Train Don't Stop There Anymore" – 4:39
2. "Did Anybody Sleep with Joan of Arc" – 4:18
3. "I Want Love" (live) – 4:34
4. "Philadelphia Freedom" (live) – 5:08

== Charts ==
Weekly chart performance for "This Train Don't Stop There Anymore"
Chart (2002)	Peak position
Netherlands (Dutch Top 40 Tipparade)	18
Netherlands (Single Top 100)	83
Scottish Singles Sales (Official Charts)	24
UK Singles (Official Charts)	24
US Adult Contemporary (Billboard)	10

== Covers ==
Country music artists Rosanne Cash and Emmylou Harris covered the song for the 2018 tribute album Restoration: Reimagining the Songs of Elton John and Bernie Taupin.
