= I Want Love =

2001 single by Elton John

Single by Elton John

from the album Songs from the West Coast
- Released: 17 September 2001
- Length: 4:35 (LP version); 3:57 (radio edit)
- Label: Rocket; Mercury
- Songwriters: Elton John; Bernie Taupin
- Producer: Patrick Leonard

Elton John singles chronology
"Perfect Day" (2001)	"I Want Love" (2001)	"This Train Don't Stop There Anymore" (2002)

Music video
- "I Want Love" on YouTube

"I Want Love" is a song written by British musician Elton John and lyricist Bernie Taupin, released as the first single from John's 26th studio album, Songs from the West Coast (2001). The song was serviced to American radio on 20 August 2001 and was released commercially in Australia on 17 September 2001, with a UK release following seven days later.

"I Want Love" reached the top 10 in Canada and the United Kingdom. In the United States, "I Want Love" reached No. 10 on the Billboard Bubbling Under Hot 100 Singles chart and No. 6 on the Adult Contemporary chart. The song was nominated for a Grammy Award in 2002 for Best Male Pop Vocal Performance, losing to James Taylor's re-recorded version of "Don't Let Me Be Lonely Tonight".

"I Want Love" appeared in an advert for Royal Mail, in which John starred. It is also performed in the musical biopic film Rocketman (2019), sung by a cast including Kit Connor, Steven Mackintosh, Bryce Dallas Howard, and Gemma Jones.

== Music video ==
Route scheme in the music video

The music video was shot with the actor Robert Downey Jr. walking through Greystone Mansion and lip-syncing the song. Video director Sam Taylor-Johnson shot 16 takes of the video and used the last one because, according to John, Downey looked completely relaxed, and, "The way he underplays it is fantastic".

== Charts ==
=== Weekly charts ===
Weekly chart performance for "I Want Love"
Chart (2001–2002)	Peak position
Australia (ARIA)	63
Belgium (Ultratip Bubbling Under Wallonia)	15
Canada (Nielsen SoundScan)	7
Europe (Eurochart Hot 100)	35
France (SNEP)	67
Ireland (IRMA)	34
Italy (FIMI)	14
Netherlands (Single Top 100)	31
New Zealand (Recorded Music NZ)	49
Switzerland (Schweizer Hitparade)	31
UK Singles (Official Charts)	9
US Bubbling Under Hot 100 (Billboard)	10
US Adult Contemporary (Billboard)	6
US Adult Pop Airplay (Billboard)	28

=== Year-end charts ===
2001 year-end chart performance for "I Want Love" by Elton John
Chart (2001)	Position
Canada (Nielsen SoundScan)	72
UK Singles (OCC)	141
US Adult Contemporary (Billboard)	29

2002 year-end chart performance for "I Want Love" by Elton John
Chart (2002)	Position
Canada (Nielsen SoundScan)	136
US Adult Contemporary (Billboard)	44

== Certifications ==
Certifications for "I Want Love"
Region	Certification	Certified units/sales
United Kingdom (BPI)	Silver	200,000^{‡}
^{‡} Sales+streaming figures based on certification alone.

== Release history ==
Region	Date	Format(s)	Label(s)	Ref.
United States	20 August 2001	Adult contemporary radio	Rocket; Universal	
United States	21 August 2001	Contemporary hit radio	Rocket; Universal	
Australia	17 September 2001	CD	Rocket; Mercury	
Japan	21 September 2001	CD	Rocket; Mercury	
United Kingdom	24 September 2001	CD; cassette	Rocket; Mercury	

== Chris Stapleton cover ==
Chris Stapleton covered "I Want Love" in the spring of 2018. It is included on the compilation album, Restoration: Reimagining the Songs of Elton John and Bernie Taupin.
