= Sacrifice (Elton John song) =

1989 single by Elton John

Single by Elton John

from the album Sleeping with the Past
- A-side: "Healing Hands" (re-release)
- B-side: "Love Is a Cannibal" (original)
- Released: 23 October 1989
- Studio: Puk (Gjerlev, Denmark)
- Genre: Soft rock; synth-pop
- Length: 5:07
- Label: Rocket; MCA
- Songwriters: Elton John; Bernie Taupin
- Producer: Chris Thomas

Elton John singles chronology
"Healing Hands" (1989)	"Sacrifice" (1989)	"Club at the End of the Street" (1990)

Music video
- "Sacrifice" on YouTube

"Sacrifice" is a song by British musician Elton John, written by John and Bernie Taupin, from John's twenty-second studio album Sleeping with the Past (1989). It was first released in October 1989 as the second single from the album. It achieved success in 1990, particularly in France and the United Kingdom, becoming John's first solo chart-topper in both nations. The song describes how hard it is to stay faithful and devoted in a marriage, challenging the mantra that a successful union requires sacrifice. Due to the song's success, John has played this song in various locations in the years since it was released.

== Critical reception ==
David Giles from Music Week wrote, "Probably the best track from his slightly disappointing recent LP. Elton's in subdued, wistful mood — it's a ballad, and that's where his strength lies these days — but it bears the stamp of true songwriting genius, the innate sense of which chord goes next to make the most interesting tune." Much more critical, Iestyn George of Record Mirror described "Sacrifice" as "a hackneyed old ballad written by Bernie Taupin (also responsible for one of Cliff Richard's recent aberrations) which is blown out of all proportion in the production suite".

== Chart performance ==
"Sacrifice" was initially released as a single in 1989 but stalled at number 55 in the UK and at number 18 in the US in March 1990. In mid-1990, English DJ Steve Wright began playing the song on BBC Radio 1, soon followed by many more radio DJs. The song was then re-released as a double A-side single, along with "Healing Hands", and reached number one in the UK in June 1990. Thus, it became John's first solo number-one single in the UK Singles Chart, remaining on the top spot for five weeks. With this re-release, Elton John also got his first number one in France and stayed on the chart for 26 weeks.

== Music video ==
The accompanying music video for "Sacrifice" was directed by Alek Keshishian and starred supermodel Yasmeen Ghauri and singer-songwriter Chris Isaak. The video, which follows the song's lyrics, portrays a man and woman having problems in their relationship after being married and raising a daughter. After they go their separate ways, the man raises his daughter alone.

== Track listings ==
=== First release ===
- 7-inch, cassette, and mini-CD single
1. "Sacrifice"
2. "Love Is a Cannibal" (from the Columbia Motion Picture Ghostbusters II)
- 12-inch and CD single
1. "Sacrifice"
2. "Love Is a Cannibal" (from the Columbia Motion Picture Ghostbusters II)
3. "Durban Deep"

=== Second release ===
- 7-inch and cassette single
1. "Sacrifice"
2. "Healing Hands"
- 12-inch and CD single
1. "Sacrifice"
2. "Healing Hands"
3. "Durban Deep"

== Personnel ==
- Elton John – vocals, Roland RD-1000 digital piano
- Guy Babylon – Yamaha DX7
- Fred Mandel – Roland Alpha Juno synthesizers
- Peter Iverson – Fairlight and Audiofile programming
- Davey Johnstone – electric guitar
- Romeo Williams – bass
- Jonathan Moffett – Yamaha RX-5 programming

== Charts ==
=== Weekly charts ===
Chart (1989–1990)	Peak position
Australia (ARIA)	7
Belgium (Ultratop 50 Flanders)	2
Canada Top Singles (RPM)	15
Canada Adult Contemporary (RPM)	4
Europe (Eurochart Hot 100)	1
Finland (Suomen virallinen lista)	20
France (SNEP)	1
Ireland (IRMA)	2
Luxembourg (Radio Luxembourg)	1
Netherlands (Dutch Top 40)	3
Netherlands (Single Top 100)	3
New Zealand (Recorded Music NZ)	19
Norway (VG-lista)	2
Switzerland (Schweizer Hitparade)	23
UK Singles (Official Charts)	55
UK Singles (Official Charts) with "Healing Hands"	1
US Billboard Hot 100	18
US Adult Contemporary (Billboard)	3
US Cash Box Top 100	19
West Germany (GfK)	36
Zimbabwe (ZIMA)	6

=== Monthly charts ===
Monthly chart performance
Chart (2026)	Peak position
Paraguay Airplay (SGP)	13

=== Year-end charts ===
Chart (1990)	Position
Australia (ARIA)	47
Belgium (Ultratop)	10
Brazil (Crowley)	53
Canada Adult Contemporary (RPM)	31
Europe (Eurochart Hot 100)	4
Germany (Media Control)	71
Netherlands (Dutch Top 40)	11
Netherlands (Single Top 100)	8
Sweden (Topplistan)	60
UK Singles (OCC)	3
US Adult Contemporary (Billboard)	8

== Certifications ==
Region	Certification	Certified units/sales
Australia (ARIA)	Gold	35,000^{^}
Brazil (Pro-Música Brasil)	Gold	30,000^{‡}
Denmark (IFPI Danmark)	Gold	45,000^{‡}
France (SNEP)	Silver	200,000^{*}
Italy (FIMI)	Gold	50,000^{‡}
New Zealand (RMNZ)	Platinum	30,000^{‡}
Spain (Promusicae)	Platinum	60,000^{‡}
United Kingdom (BPI)	Platinum	600,000^{^}
United States (RIAA)	Gold	500,000^{‡}
^{*} Sales figures based on certification alone.^{^} Shipments figures based on certification alone.^{‡} Sales+streaming figures based on certification alone.

== Samples ==
- This song, along with other Elton John songs "Rocket Man", "Kiss the Bride" and "Where's the Shoorah?", was sampled in the 2021 collaboration between John and Dua Lipa titled "Cold Heart".
