= Healing Hands (Elton John song) =

1989 single by Elton John

Single by Elton John

from the album Sleeping with the Past
- A-side: "Sacrifice"; (second release)
- B-side: "Dancing in the End Zone"; (first release)
- Released: 7 August 1989
- Length: 4:21
- Label: Rocket (UK); MCA (US)
- Songwriters: Elton John; Bernie Taupin
- Producer: Chris Thomas

Elton John singles chronology
"Through the Storm" (1989)	"Healing Hands" (1989)	"Sacrifice" (1989)

Music video
- "Healing Hands" on YouTube

"Healing Hands" is a song by British musician Elton John and lyricist Bernie Taupin, performed by John. It is from John's 1989 album Sleeping with the Past. The single was released in August 1989 and was a top-20 hit in the United States. A reissued version (paired as a double A-side single with "Sacrifice") became the singer's first solo number-one single in the United Kingdom in June 1990.

The song was inspired by the Four Tops song "Reach Out, I'll Be There". Produced by Chris Thomas, it was the first of three singles released from the album, with the follow-ups being "Sacrifice" and "Club at the End of the Street".

== Release and reception ==
"Healing Hands" did moderately well as a single in the United States, climbing to No. 13 on the Billboard Hot 100 and reaching No. 1 on the Billboard Adult Contemporary chart on the week of 21 October 1989. The song failed to make the UK top 40 during its initial release, as did the follow-up, "Sacrifice". After Steve Wright of BBC Radio One added "Sacrifice" to his station's playlist, "Sacrifice" was re-released in the UK as a double A-side with "Healing Hands". The double A-side record topped the UK Singles Chart for five weeks starting 23 June 1990, becoming the first solo No. 1 hit of Elton John's career in his native country.

Cash Box reviewed the single saying that "Elton has gone back to basics, and delivers a great song this time, relying only on a piano and his golden throat to get him through."

== Music video ==
The music video filmed in black and white features John singing with backgrounds singers Jackson, Jenkins and Jeter standing on platforms with black flags waving in back of them and even John in a flag as well.

== Technical details ==
Musically, the intro and verses are in B flat major, with the chorus in D major. An instrumental solo, in the related minor key of G (minor), serves as a bridge.

== Personnel ==
- Elton John – lead vocals, harmony vocals, keyboards
- Guy Babylon – keyboards
- Fred Mandel – keyboards
- Peter Iversen – Fairlight and Audiofile programming
- Davey Johnstone – guitars, backing vocals
- Romeo Williams – bass
- Jonathan Moffett – drums
- Natalie Jackson – backing vocals
- Mortonette Jenkins – backing vocals
- Marlena Jeter – backing vocals

== Charts ==
=== Weekly charts ===
Chart (1989–1990)	Peak position
Australia (ARIA)	14
Austria (Ö3 Austria Top 40)	10
Canada Top Singles (RPM)	6
Canada Adult Contemporary (RPM)	1
Europe (Eurochart Hot 100)	37
Italy Airplay (Music & Media)	1
Netherlands (Single Top 100)	60
Switzerland (Schweizer Hitparade)	13
UK Singles (Official Charts)	45
UK Singles (Official Charts) with "Sacrifice"	1
US Billboard Hot 100	13
US Adult Contemporary (Billboard)	1
US Mainstream Rock (Billboard)	23
West Germany (GfK)	39
Zimbabwe (ZIMA)	2

=== Year-end charts ===
Chart (1989)	Position
Australia (ARIA)	61
Canada Top Singles (RPM)	46

Chart (1990)	Position
UK Singles (OCC)	3
