= Sleeping with the Past Tour =

1989–90 concert tour by Elton John

- Tour by Elton John
- Poster to the concert in Frankfurt, West Germany
- Location: North America; Oceania
- Associated album: Sleeping with the Past
- Start date: 28 July 1989
- End date: 20 May 1990
- Legs: 3
- No. of shows: 74

Elton John concert chronology
- Reg Strikes Back Tour (1988–89); Sleeping with the Past Tour (1989–90); The One Tour (1992–93)

The Sleeping with the Past Tour was a worldwide concert tour by English musician and composer Elton John, in support of his 22nd studio album, Sleeping with the Past. The tour included a total of three legs (in North America and Oceania) and a total of 74 shows.

== Background ==
Elton John's album, Sleeping with the Past, received lukewarm reviews when the album was released in 1989.

Despite the critical judgment of the album, it became his highest-selling studio album in the United Kingdom, being certified 3× Platinum and spawned his first solo number-one hit in his home country.

During many of these shows, John performed three or four songs from Sleeping with the Past — an unusual move since the new album would not be released until August, and thus audiences were hearing this material for the first time. Also new to the production was a two-minute show intro, conceived and recorded by Davey Johnstone and Guy Babylon, which played as the band walked out on to the stage, using an alternate arrangement of "Bennie and the Jets" to introduce the show's first song. This technique would be used on several subsequent tours and change depending on what song was chosen as the set opener.

On 18 October 1989 in New Haven, Connecticut, he rushed through his performance rarely talking to the audience. Midway through his concert, he announced he would not perform material from the new album because MCA was not promoting it.

By the time this final leg of the tour would end, John and his band, now with Charlie Morgan on drums, had been on the road almost constantly for two full years. John played 20 dates in six cities in Australia, beginning at the Entertainment Centre in Perth on 27 January 1990, and concluding three weeks later with seven nights at the Sydney Entertainment Centre.

Next came shows in New Zealand on 28 February and 3 March before the tour moved on to America, where he did three shows at the Mark G. Etess Arena in Atlantic City, New Jersey, on 18–20 May. The set list at these US shows featured the premiere of "Made for Me", one of four new songs he had recorded for his then-upcoming box set, To Be Continued...

Two months later, John checked himself in to a Chicago-area hospital for addiction treatment and would not tour again for two years.

== Tour dates ==
Date	City	Country	Venue	Tickets sold / available	Revenue
North America, Leg 1
28 July 1989	Hartford	United States	Hartford Civic Center	15,799 / 15,799	$355,478
29 July 1989	Providence	United States	Providence Civic Center	14,241 / 14,241	$320,423
30 July 1989	Saratoga Springs	United States	Saratoga Performing Arts Center		
1 August 1989	Mansfield	United States	Woods Performing Arts Center		
2 August 1989	Mansfield	United States	Woods Performing Arts Center		
4 August 1989	East Rutherford	United States	Brendan Byrne Arena	59,992 / 59,992	$1,491,547
6 August 1989	East Rutherford	United States	Brendan Byrne Arena	59,992 / 59,992	$1,491,547
7 August 1989	East Rutherford	United States	Brendan Byrne Arena	59,992 / 59,992	$1,491,547
9 August 1989	New Orleans	United States	Lakefront Arena	9,866 / 9,866	$230,550
10 August 1989	Houston	United States	The Summit	14,463 / 14,463	$338,224
11 August 1989	Dallas	United States	Coca-Cola Starplex	20,053 / 20,053	$395,755
12 August 1989	Bonner Springs	United States	Sandstone Amphitheater	13,488 / 15,000	$315,792
15 August 1989	Inglewood	United States	Great Western Forum	42,000 / 42,000	$945,000
17 August 1989	Inglewood	United States	Great Western Forum	42,000 / 42,000	$945,000
18 August 1989	Inglewood	United States	Great Western Forum	42,000 / 42,000	$945,000
19 August 1989	Costa Mesa	United States	Pacific Amphitheatre		
20 August 1989	Mountain View	United States	Shoreline Amphitheatre		
22 August 1989	Greenwood Village	United States	Fiddler's Green Amphitheatre		
26 August 1989	Hoffman Estates	United States	Poplar Creek Music Theater		
27 August 1989	Hoffman Estates	United States	Poplar Creek Music Theater		
29 August 1989	Cuyahoga Falls	United States	Blossom Music Center		
30 August 1989	Noblesville	United States	Deer Creek Music Center	18,000 / 18,000	
1 September 1989	Clarkston	United States	Pine Knob Music Theatre		
2 September 1989	Clarkston	United States	Pine Knob Music Theatre		
3 September 1989	Clarkston	United States	Pine Knob Music Theatre		
12 September 1989	Cincinnati	United States	Riverbend Music Center	16,518 / 16,518	
13 September 1989	Cincinnati	United States	Riverbend Music Center	16,985 / 16,985	
15 September 1989	Nashville	United States	Starwood Amphitheater	17,137 / 17,137	
16 September 1989	Atlanta	United States	Lakewood Amphitheater		
17 September 1989	Atlanta	United States	Lakewood Amphitheater		
19 September 1989	Pittsburgh	United States	Civic Arena		
23 September 1989	Chapel Hill	United States	Dean Smith Center		
25 September 1989	Montreal	Canada	Montreal Forum		
26 September 1989	Montreal	Canada	Montreal Forum		
27 September 1989	Toronto	Canada	SkyDome	35,084 / 35,084	$839,274
30 September 1989	Philadelphia	United States	The Spectrum	31,624 / 31,624	$748,904
1 October 1989	Philadelphia	United States	The Spectrum	31,624 / 31,624	$748,904
3 October 1989	New York City	United States	Madison Square Garden	65,345 / 65,345	$1,613,975
4 October 1989	New York City	United States	Madison Square Garden	65,345 / 65,345	$1,613,975
5 October 1989	New York City	United States	Madison Square Garden	65,345 / 65,345	$1,613,975
6 October 1989	New York City	United States	Madison Square Garden	65,345 / 65,345	$1,613,975
7 October 1989	New York City	United States	Madison Square Garden	65,345 / 65,345	$1,613,975
13 October 1989	Miami	United States	Miami Arena	13,276 / 13,276	$315,305
15 October 1989	Orlando	United States	Orlando Arena	14,762 / 14,762	$332,167
16 October 1989	Charlotte	United States	Charlotte Coliseum	22,679 / 22,679	$353,700
17 October 1989	Landover	United States	Capital Centre	16,292 / 16,292	$407,300
18 October 1989	New Haven	United States	New Haven Coliseum	10,505 / 10,505	$259,650
Oceania
27 January 1990	Perth	Australia	Perth Entertainment Centre		
28 January 1990	Perth	Australia	Perth Entertainment Centre		
29 January 1990	Perth	Australia	Perth Entertainment Centre		
1 February 1990	Melbourne	Australia	National Tennis Centre		
2 February 1990	Melbourne	Australia	National Tennis Centre		
3 February 1990	Melbourne	Australia	National Tennis Centre		
5 February 1990	Hobart	Australia	Derwent Entertainment Centre		
6 February 1990	Hobart	Australia	Derwent Entertainment Centre		
7 February 1990	Hobart	Australia	Derwent Entertainment Centre		
10 February 1990	Adelaide	Australia	Memorial Drive Park		
11 February 1990	Adelaide	Australia	Memorial Drive Park		
14 February 1990	Brisbane	Australia	Brisbane Entertainment Centre		
15 February 1990	Brisbane	Australia	Brisbane Entertainment Centre		
17 February 1990	Sydney	Australia	Sydney Entertainment Centre		
18 February 1990	Sydney	Australia	Sydney Entertainment Centre		
20 February 1990	Sydney	Australia	Sydney Entertainment Centre		
21 February 1990	Sydney	Australia	Sydney Entertainment Centre		
23 February 1990	Sydney	Australia	Sydney Entertainment Centre		
24 February 1990	Sydney	Australia	Sydney Entertainment Centre		
25 February 1990	Sydney	Australia	Sydney Entertainment Centre		
28 February 1990	Christchurch	New Zealand	Addington Showgrounds		
1 March 1990	Auckland	New Zealand	Mount Smart Stadium		
3 March 1990	Auckland	New Zealand	Mount Smart Stadium		
North America, Leg 2
18 May 1990	Atlantic City	United States	Etess Arena		
19 May 1990	Atlantic City	United States	Etess Arena		
20 May 1990	Atlantic City	United States	Etess Arena		

== 1989 setlists ==
Providence Civic Center, Providence RI 7/29/1989
1. Bennie and the Jets
2. Island Girl
3. Harmony
4. Tiny Dancer
5. Sleeping with the Past
6. The Bitch Is Back/Brown Sugar
7. I Guess That's Why They Call It the Blues
8. Mona Lisas and Mad Hatters Parts 1 & 2
9. Funeral for a Friend/Love Lies Bleeding
10. Sorry Seems to Be the Hardest Word
11. Daniel
12. Candle in the Wind
13. Sacrifice
14. Blue Eyes
15. Philadelphia Freedom
16. Burn Down the Mission
17. Come Down in Time
18. Healing Hands
19. Levon
20. Stones Throw From Hurtin'
21. Kiss The Bride
22. Sad Songs (Say So Much)
23. Don't Let the Sun Go Down on Me
24. I Don't Wanna Go on with You Like That
25. Saturday Night's Alright for Fighting
26. I'm Still Standing
27. Rocket Man

== 1990 setlists ==
Standard setlist
1. Bennie and the Jets
2. Tiny Dancer
3. The Bitch Is Back
4. Brown Sugar
5. I Guess That's Why They Call It the Blues
6. Made for Me
7. Mona Lisas and Mad Hatters Parts 1 & 2
8. Funeral for a Friend/Love Lies Bleeding
9. Your Song
10. Daniel
11. Sacrifice
12. Candle in the Wind
13. Philadelphia Freedom
14. Healing Hands
15. Sad Songs (Say So Much)
16. Don't Let the Sun Go Down on Me
17. I Don't Wanna Go on with You Like That
18. I’m Still Standing

== Personnel ==
- Elton John – Roland RD-1000 digital piano and lead vocals
- Davey Johnstone – guitars
- Romeo Williams – bass
- Fred Mandel – keyboards/guitar
- Guy Babylon – keyboards
- Jonathan Moffett – drums (North American leg)
- Charlie Morgan – drums (Oceania and second North American leg)
- Mortonette Jenkins – backing vocals
- Marlena Jeter – backing vocals
- Natalie Jackson – backing vocals
