= Sleeping with the Past =

Studio album by Elton John
- Released: 4 September 1989
- Recorded: November 1988 – March 1989
- Studios: Puk (Gjerlev, Denmark); AIR (London)
- Genre: Pop
- Length: 47:43
- Labels: MCA (US); Rocket (UK)
- Producer: Chris Thomas

Elton John chronology
Reg Strikes Back (1988)	Sleeping with the Past (1989)	The Very Best of Elton John (1990)

Singles from Sleeping with the Past
- 1. "Healing Hands" Released: August 1989; 2. "Sacrifice" Released: October 1989; 3. "Club at the End of the Street" Released: April 1990; 4. "Whispers" Released: November 1990 (EU)

Professional ratings
Review scores
Source	Rating
AllMusic	2/5 stars
Chicago Tribune	2.5/4 stars
The Encyclopedia of Popular Music	3/5 stars
Hi-Fi News & Record Review	A:1
Los Angeles Times	2.5/5 stars

Sleeping with the Past is the twenty-second studio album by British musician Elton John, released on 4 September 1989. It is his best-selling album in Denmark (where it was recorded) and is dedicated to his longtime writing partner Bernie Taupin. The album features "Sacrifice" and "Healing Hands", which were issued as a double A-side and became John's first solo number-one single in his home country on the UK singles chart. The single's success helped the album also reach number one on the UK Albums Chart, his first since 1974's Elton John's Greatest Hits. It also became his first platinum album in the UK since 1985's Ice on Fire. In the US it was certified gold in October 1989 and platinum in April 1990 by the RIAA. Sleeping with the Past became John's best selling album of the 1980s.

John and Taupin intended for the songs to reflect the style of 1960s R&B singers such as Marvin Gaye, Otis Redding and Sam Cooke, whom they admired.

Guy Babylon made his debut on this album and would continue to play keyboards with John for the next 20 years, while Fred Mandel left the Elton John Band shortly after. John went into rehabilitation in 1990.

== Background ==
With renewed creativity after 1988's Reg Strikes Back, Elton John and Bernie Taupin sought to create a cohesive album that had maintained a consistent theme. Inspired by the success of Billy Joel's 1983 album An Innocent Man, they decided to pay a similar tribute to the R&B sound of the 1960s and 1970s that inspired them as youths. Taupin would listen to '60s soul songs and use those songs from the past to inspire new lyrics for their album. He would then write down which artists or songs influenced him. John would then use Taupin's lyrics as a guide to write a soul-influenced song based on the original source of inspiration. As Taupin described to rock historian Steven P. Wheeler, "I said [to Elton] that we have to sit down and decide what we want to make, and make a cohesive album with a collection of songs that sound like they all fit together. So, we came up with the idea of going back and listening to the songs that inspired us when we first started writing songs, the time when R&B records were really great – the Chess days, the Stax records, and when Motown was at its peak. ... So, I started dragging out all these old records and listening to them to get a feel, and we decided to basically make a white-soul album for the late '80s, and I think that's what we've done."

Sleeping with the Past is the second of John's albums where he plays a Roland RD-1000 digital piano, which he used on most songs except "I Never Knew Her Name" and "Blue Avenue", on which he played the Bösendorfer acoustic piano at Puk Recording Studios. John used the Roland Digital on promotional appearances associated with the album and the subsequent Sleeping with the Past Tour. Davey Johnstone is the only member of the "classic" Elton John Band who appeared on the album—Dee Murray and Nigel Olsson being notable absences. Keyboardist Guy Babylon made his first appearance on an Elton John album, and also joined his touring band at the same time.

Months after the album's completion, John attributed its creative success to the certainty that some unpleasant chapters in his life, such as his battle with The Sun, were drawing to a close. In 1989 he said: "This is the first album I've made where I didn't have any pressures hanging over me...When I started it, I knew my personal life was going to be sorted out". Some years later he said: "I was sober when I recorded Sleeping with the Past – just", but that changed soon after: "I went off the rails when I did the tour afterwards". During the tour's first week, he collapsed onstage.

The album was released late during John's 1989 American leg of his tour with little support from MCA Records. John canceled tour shows and interviews. In New Haven, Connecticut, on 18 October 1989, he rushed through his performance rarely talking to the audience. Midway through his concert, he announced he would not perform material from the new album because MCA was not promoting it.

In addition to "Sacrifice", "Healing Hands" and "Club at the End of the Street", which were singles in both the UK and US, the songs "Whispers" and "Blue Avenue" were released as singles in parts of Continental Europe. "Whispers" reached No. 11 in France, whilst "Blue Avenue" managed to reach the Top 75 in the Netherlands. "Blue Avenue" described his failed marriage to Renate Blauel.

Three other songs were recorded during the sessions: "Dancing in the End Zone" and "Love Is a Cannibal", both with Davey Johnstone as a co-writer, were released as B-sides to two of the album's singles, and were later included as bonus tracks on CD re-issues of the album. "Love Is Worth Waiting For" had been demoed during the Reg Strikes Back sessions the year before and was further worked on at Puk but has never been released. This song, however, was performed live at an Athletes and Entertainers for Kids event in Los Angeles in July 1988, making one of only two Elton John/Bernie Taupin songs to be performed live but never officially issued. Another song, "Sugar and Fire", also did not make it past the demo stage. "Love Is a Cannibal" was featured in the 1989 film Ghostbusters II.

Wynonna Judd recorded a contemporary country music cover version of "Stone's Throw from Hurtin" which was featured in the 1992 film Leap of Faith starring Steve Martin.

The album was later remastered (by John's longtime producer Gus Dudgeon) as part of the Elton John: The Classic Years series in 1998; the re-release included the aforementioned "Dancing in the End Zone" and "Love Is a Cannibal" as bonus tracks.

== Reception ==
Sleeping with the Past received lukewarm reviews when it was released in 1989. After peaking at No. 6 in October 1989 on the UK Albums Chart, the re-release of "Sacrifice" as a double A-side with "Healing Hands" in June 1990, and that single's rise to the #1 spot, Sleeping with the Past was propelled back up to the #1 position on the UK Albums Chart shortly afterwards, giving John his first No. 1 album in his home country since 1977. The feat was repeated when the greatest hits compilation The Very Best of Elton John was released in the autumn of 1990.

The album became his highest-selling studio album in the UK, being certified 3× Platinum and spawned his first solo No. 1 hit in his home country.

== Track listing ==
All tracks are written by Elton John and Bernie Taupin.

Side one
No.	Title	Length
1.	"Durban Deep"	5:32
2.	"Healing Hands"	4:23
3.	"Whispers"	5:28
4.	"Club at the End of the Street"	4:49
5.	"Sleeping with the Past"	4:58

Side two
No.	Title	Length
1.	"Stone's Throw from Hurtin'"	4:55
2.	"Sacrifice"	5:07
3.	"I Never Knew Her Name"	3:31
4.	"Amazes Me"	4:39
5.	"Blue Avenue"	4:21
Total length:		47:43

- Sides one and two were combined as tracks 1–10 on CD reissues.

Bonus tracks (1998 Polygram International reissue)
No.	Title	Length
11.	"Dancing in the End Zone"	3:53
12.	"Love Is a Cannibal"	3:52
Total length:		55:28

Notes

- The version of "Durban Deep" on the 1998 remaster features a different vocal mix and is slightly extended from the original album version (the fade out lasts about ten seconds longer). Conversely, "Stone's Throw from Hurtin'" fades out around 10 seconds earlier.

== Personnel ==
=== Musicians ===
Track numbering refers to CD and digital releases of the album.

- Elton John – vocals, keyboards, backing vocals (1)
- Guy Babylon – keyboards
- Fred Mandel – keyboards (1–3, 5, 7, 9, 10), guitars (1, 4, 8), organ (4), guitar solo (6)
- Peter Iversen – Fairlight and Audiofile programming
- Davey Johnstone – guitars, backing vocals (1, 2, 4–6, 8–10)
- Romeo Williams – bass
- Jonathan Moffett – drums
- Vince Denham – saxophone (4)
- Natalie Jackson – backing vocals (2, 5, 6, 8, 9)
- Mortonette Jenkins – backing vocals (2, 5, 6, 8, 9)
- Marlena Jeter – backing vocals (2, 5, 6, 8, 9)

=== Production ===
- Chris Thomas – producer
- David Nicholas – engineer
- Karl Lever – assistant engineer
- Greg Fulginiti – mastering at Artisan Sound Recorders (Hollywood, California, USA)
- Steve Brown – album coordinator
- Adrian Collee – studio coordinator
- Dee Whelan – studio coordinator
- Tom Pearce – keyboard technician
- Rick Salazar – guitar technician
- Terry Wade – drum technician
- Wherefore Art? – design
- Herb Ritts – photography
- John Reid – management

== Charts ==
=== Weekly charts ===
Weekly chart performance for Sleeping with the Past
Chart (1989–1991)	Peak position
Australian Albums (ARIA)	2
Austrian Albums (Ö3 Austria)	5
Canada Top Albums/CDs (RPM)	23
Danish Albums (Hitlisten)	7
Dutch Albums (Album Top 100)	5
French Albums (SNEP)	2
German Albums (Offizielle Top 100)	9
Hungarian Albums (MAHASZ)	25
Italian Albums (Musica e Dischi)	6
New Zealand Albums (RMNZ)	1
Norwegian Albums (VG-lista)	7
Spanish Albums (Spanish Albums Chart)	3
Swedish Albums (Sverigetopplistan)	23
Swiss Albums (Schweizer Hitparade)	1
UK Albums (Official Charts)	1
US Billboard 200	23

=== Year-end charts ===
1989 year-end chart performance for Sleeping with the Past
Chart (1989)	Position
Canada Top Albums/CDs (RPM)	63
French Albums (SNEP)	7
Swiss Albums (Schweizer Hitparade)	23

1990 year-end chart performance for Sleeping with the Past
Chart (1990)	Position
Australian Albums (ARIA)	8
Dutch Albums (Dutch Album Top 100)	82
UK Albums (OCC)	9

== Certifications and sales ==
Certifications and sales for Sleeping with the Past
Region	Certification	Certified units/sales
Australia (ARIA)	4× Platinum	280,000^{^}
Austria (IFPI Austria)	Gold	25,000^{*}
Belgium (BRMA)	Gold	25,000^{*}
Brazil (Pro-Música Brasil)	Gold	100,000^{*}
Canada (Music Canada)	2× Platinum	200,000^{^}
France (SNEP)	Platinum	700,000
Germany (BVMI)	Gold	250,000^{^}
Italy (FIMI)	2× Platinum	370,000
Japan	—	112,900
Netherlands (NVPI)	Gold	50,000^{^}
New Zealand (RMNZ)	2× Platinum	30,000^{^}
Norway (IFPI Norway)	Gold	50,000
Spain (Promusicae)	Platinum	100,000^{^}
Switzerland (IFPI Switzerland)	2× Platinum	100,000^{^}
United Kingdom (BPI)	3× Platinum	1,000,000
United States (RIAA)	Platinum	1,000,000^{^}
^{*} Sales figures based on certification alone.^{^} Shipments figures based on certification alone.
