= Club at the End of the Street =

1990 single by Elton John

Single by Elton John

from the album Sleeping with the Past
- B-side: "Give Peace a Chance" (Europe) "Whispers" (UK) "Sacrifice" (US)
- Released: April 1990
- Genre: Pop rock
- Length: 4:49 (album version); 4:29 (single version)
- Label: Rocket (UK); MCA (US)
- Composer: Elton John
- Lyricist: Bernie Taupin
- Producer: Chris Thomas

Elton John singles chronology
"Sacrifice" (1989)	"Club at the End of the Street" (1990)	"You Gotta Love Someone" (1990)

Music video
- "Club at the End of the Street" on YouTube

"Club at the End of the Street" is a song by British musician Elton John and lyricist Bernie Taupin, performed by John. It was included on John's album Sleeping with the Past in 1989 and released as its third single in 1990. The song describes a night on the town between two lovers at an undisclosed nightclub. In 2013, John stated in Rolling Stone that this song was one of his favourites. The song featured an animated music video. He performed it three times live during the One Night Only concerts in 2000.

For the single release, John's rendition of the well-known John Lennon song "Give Peace a Chance" was used for the B-side.

== Chart performance ==
The single was a No. 28 pop hit in the US and a Top 40 hit in several countries in the summer of 1990; whilst in Denmark, where the album was recorded, it reached No. 1 for two weeks and remains one of John's biggest hits in that country.

== Music video ==
The music video was produced by Animation City, an animation company in London and directed by Derek Hayes; it followed the success of the Madonna video "Dear Jessie" by the same company. The music video version of the track is slightly faster than the single and album versions. The animated version of Elton John would make a cameo appearance a year later in Rod Stewart's "The Motown Song" music video; which was also created by the same company.

- Director – Derek Hayes
- Producer – Maddy Sparrow
- Designer – Lin Jammet
- Animators – Neville Astley, Paul Cowan, Jimmy Farrington, Kevin Griffiths, Andy Goff, Malcolm Hartley, Derek Hayes and Erica Russell.
- Additional Animation – 'A' For Animation
- Production Company – Animation City

== Track listings ==
7-inch and CD single

1. "Club at the End of the Street" – 4:49
2. "Give Peace a Chance" – 3:46

12-inch maxi

1. "Club at the End of the Street" – 4:49
2. "Give Peace a Chance" – 3:46
3. "I Don't Wanna Go on with You Like That" (live in Verona, Italy) – 5:37

== Personnel ==
- Elton John – keyboards, lead and harmony vocals, backing vocals
- Guy Babylon – keyboards
- Fred Mandel – keyboards, organ, guitar
- Peter Iversen – Fairlight and Audiofile programming
- Davey Johnstone – guitar, backing vocals
- Romeo Williams – bass
- Jonathan Moffett – drums
- Vince Denham – saxophone

== Charts ==
=== Weekly charts ===
Chart (1990)	Peak position
Australia (ARIA)	19
Austria (Ö3 Austria Top 40)	30
Belgium (Ultratop 50 Flanders)	24
Canada Top Singles (RPM)	12
Canada Adult Contemporary (RPM)	2
Europe (Eurochart Hot 100)	46
France (SNEP)	24
Germany (GfK)	45
Ireland (IRMA)	27
Italy Airplay (Music & Media)	6
Netherlands (Dutch Top 40)	33
Netherlands (Single Top 100)	28
UK Singles (Official Charts) with "Whispers"	47
US Billboard Hot 100	28
US Adult Contemporary (Billboard)	2
US Cash Box Top 100	24

=== Year-end charts ===
Chart (1990)	Position
Canada Top Singles (RPM)	92
Canada Adult Contemporary (RPM)	26
US Adult Contemporary (Billboard)	10
US (Joel Whitburn's Pop Annual)	174

== Release history ==
Region	Date	Format(s)	Label(s)	Ref.
United States	April 1990	7-inch vinyl; cassette	MCA	
Australia	14 May 1990	7-inch vinyl; 12-inch vinyl; CD1; cassette	Rocket	
Australia	11 June 1990	CD2	Rocket	
United Kingdom	6 August 1990	7-inch vinyl; 12-inch vinyl; CD; cassette	Rocket	

== See also ==
- List of European number-one airplay songs of the 1990s
