= Muscles (song) =

Single by Diana Ross

from the album Silk Electric
- B-side: "I Am Me"
- Released: September 17, 1982
- Recorded: 1982
- Studio: Sunset Sound Recorders, (Los Angeles, California)
- Genre: R&B, pop
- Length: 4:05 (video version/7" version): 4:41 (album version); 6:40 (12" version)
- Label: RCA
- Songwriter: Michael Jackson
- Producer: Michael Jackson

Diana Ross singles chronology
"It's Never Too Late" (1982)	"Muscles" (1982)	"So Close" (1983)

Music video
- "Muscles" on YouTube

"Muscles" is a 1982 hit single written and produced by Michael Jackson, and performed by American singer Diana Ross. It was released as the first single on September 17, 1982, by RCA from Ross's Gold-certified album Silk Electric. The single reached number No. 7 in Cash Box magazine and No. 10 on the Billboard Hot 100 chart. It climbed as high as No. 4 on the Billboard Soul chart, whilst hitting No. 2 for 2 weeks on the Cash Box Soul chart. The track featured prominent background vocals by Patti Austin with seasoned session singers Maxine and Julia Waters. It earned Ross a twelfth Grammy Award nomination for Best Female R&B Vocal Performance. (Although Ross has never won a competitive Grammy, she was awarded an honorary Lifetime Achievement Award from NARAS in 2012.) The song was originally intended to be an R&B answer to the massive Olivia Newton-John hit "Physical".

== Music video ==
The single's erotic music video featured Ross in bed dreaming of muscular men. In one scene she is shown floating through the air over a landscape which turns out to be a man's musclebound body. The video features a young Gil Birmingham (The Twilight Saga film series) in one of his first-ever media appearances.

== Track listing ==
- UK vinyl, 12" (12CL 268)
1. "Muscles" – 4:36
2. "I Am Me" – 3:50
- US vinyl, 12", promo (JD-13382)
1. "Muscles" – 6:38
2. "I Am Me" – 3:50
- US vinyl, 7" (PB 13348)
1. "Muscles" – 3:59
2. "I Am Me" – 3:50
- US vinyl, 7", Gold Standard Stereo (GB-13798)
1. "Muscles" – 3:59
2. "Pieces of Ice" – 3:57
- FR vinyl, 7" (2C 008-86609)
1. "Muscles" – 3:59
2. "I Am Me" – 3:50
- NE vinyl, 12" (052Z-86609)
1. "Muscles" – 4:35
2. "I Am Me" – 3:47
- NE vinyl, 7" (1A 006-86609)
1. "Muscles" – 3:59
2. "I Am Me" – 3:50

== Personnel ==
- Diana Ross – lead vocals
- Michael Jackson – producer, uncredited background vocals
- Ted Jensen at Sterling Sound, NYC – mastering
- Patti Austin – additional backing vocals
- Bill Wolfer – synthesizer
- Michael Boddicker – synthesizer
- Ray Chew – keyboards
- Eric Gale – guitar
- Yogi Horton – drums
- Neil Jason – bass
- Denzil Miller – keyboards
- Jeff Mironov – guitar
- Jonathan Moffett – drums
- Julia Tillman Waters – additional backing vocals
- Greg Smith – synthesizer
- Maxine Willard Waters – additional backing vocals
- David Williams – guitar
- Nathan Watts – bass

== Charts ==
Chart (1982)	Peak position
Australia (Kent Music Report)	50
Finland (Suomen virallinen lista)	16
France (SNEP)	23
Luxembourg (Radio Luxembourg)	12
Netherlands (Single Top 100)	10
Netherlands (Dutch Top 40)	10
Ireland (IRMA)	23
New Zealand (Recorded Music NZ)	18
Sweden (Sverigetopplistan)	6
UK Singles (Official Charts)	15
US Billboard Hot 100	10
US Hot R&B/Hip-Hop Songs (Billboard)	4
US Adult Contemporary (Billboard)	36
US Cash Box Top 100	7

== Cover versions ==
- The song was recorded in 1997 by producer/DJ Peter Rauhofer recording as Club 69 and was a featured single on the Club 69 album Style. The vocals on this version of "Muscles" are performed by singer-songwriter, Suzanne Palmer.

== Samples ==
- Lil' Kim sampled "Muscles" for her rap "Diamonds" but it was not included in the final cut of her album The Notorious K.I.M.
- Young Jeezy sampled "Muscles" on the title track of his album The Inspiration.
- Victoria Beckham sampled "Muscles" on the song "He's My Lover", for her unreleased second album Come Together.
