= Silk Electric =

Studio album by Diana Ross
- Released: September 10, 1982
- Recorded: 1981–1982
- Studios: Hollywood Sound Recorders, Hollywood, California; Power Station, New York City
- Genres: Pop soul; R&B; post-disco
- Length: 37:31
- Labels: Capitol (Europe); RCA (North America)
- Producers: Diana Ross; Michael Jackson

Diana Ross chronology
| Why Do Fools Fall in Love (1981) | Silk Electric (1982) | Ross (1983) |

Singles from Silk Electric
- 1. "Muscles" Released: September 17, 1982; 2. "So Close" Released: January 7, 1983; 3. "Who" Released: April 5, 1983 (Netherlands)

Professional ratings
Review scores
| Source | Rating |
|---|---|
| AllMusic | 3/5 stars |
| Rolling Stone | 3/5 stars |
| The Rolling Stone Album Guide | 2.5/5 stars |

Silk Electric is the thirteenth studio album by American R&B singer Diana Ross, released on September 10, 1982, by RCA Records. It was Ross' second of six albums released by the label during the decade. It reached No. 27 on the US Billboard 200 (No. 5 R&B), No. 33 in the UK Albums Chart and the Top 20 in Sweden, Norway and the Netherlands. The album cover was designed by Andy Warhol.

The album contains Ross' US Top 10, Grammy-nominated single, "Muscles", which was written and produced by Michael Jackson. All other tracks were produced by Ross, including the US Top 40 follow-up single "So Close" featuring prominent background vocal arrangements by Luther Vandross.

The song "In Your Arms", written by Linda Creed and Michael Masser, was covered by Teddy Pendergrass and Whitney Houston as "Hold Me" the following year. The song "I Am Me" was co-written by Ross (and incorrectly listed as co-written by Cindy Birdsong instead of Janie Bradford on the Greatest Hits: The RCA Years compilation album). The album was certified Gold in the US and Silver in the UK.

The album was remastered and re-released on September 2, 2014 by Funky Town Grooves as an "Expanded Edition", with bonus material.

== Track listing ==
Side A
| No. | Title | Writer(s) | Length |
|---|---|---|---|
| 1. | "Muscles" | Michael Jackson | 4:40 |
| 2. | "So Close" | Bill Wray; Rob Mounsey; Diana Ross | 4:14 |
| 3. | "Still in Love" | Randy Handley | 4:08 |
| 4. | "Fool for Your Love" | Bill Wray; Ray Chew; Diana Ross | 3:48 |
| 5. | "Turn Me Over" | Steve Goldstein | 1:08 |

Side B
| No. | Title | Writer(s) | Length |
|---|---|---|---|
| 6. | "Who" | Barry Blue; Rod Bowkett | 3:38 |
| 7. | "Love Lies" | Allan Chapman; Michael Hanna | 3:47 |
| 8. | "In Your Arms" | Linda Creed; Michael Masser | 4:07 |
| 9. | "Anywhere You Run To" | David Roberts | 3:31 |
| 10. | "I Am Me" | Freddie Gorman; Janie Bradford; Diana Ross | 3:52 |

2014 Expanded Edition CD2 (Funky Town Grooves)
| No. | Title | Length |
|---|---|---|
| 11. | "Muscles" (Edited Version) | 4:05 |
| 12. | "Muscles" (12" Version) | 6:40 |
| 13. | "So Close" (Single Version) | 3:53 |
| 14. | "I Am Me" (Extended Mix) | 4:27 |

== Personnel ==
Credits are adapted from the Silk Electric liner notes.

- Diana Ross – lead vocals, arrangements (3, 4, 5), backing vocals (3–10)
- Michael Jackson – uncredited backing vocals (1)
- Patti Austin – backing vocals (1)
- Julia Tillman Waters – backing vocals (1)
- Maxine Willard Waters – backing vocals (1)
- Luther Vandross – backing vocals (2), background vocal arrangements (2)
- Tawatha Agee – backing vocals (2)
- Cissy Houston – backing vocals (2)
- Paulette McWilliams – backing vocals (2)
- Denzil Miller – keyboards (1)
- Michael Boddicker – synthesizers (1)
- Greg Smith – synthesizers (1)
- Bill Wolfer – synthesizers (1)
- Rob Mounsey – keyboards (2, 3, 7), arrangements (2, 3, 7)
- Steve Goldstein – synthesizers (2, 5, 10), arrangements (5)
- Ray Chew – keyboards (4, 5, 6, 8, 10), arrangements (4, 6, 10)
- Ed Walsh – synthesizers (6, 7)
- Paul Shaffer – Fender Rhodes (9), rhythm arrangements (9)
- Joe Bargar – acoustic piano (9)
- David Williams – guitar (1)
- Eric Gale – guitar (2, 5, 6, 8, 9)
- Jeff Mironov – guitar (2, 5, 6, 8, 9)
- Bob Kulick – lead and rhythm guitars (3, 4, 7, 10)
- Nathan Watts – bass (1)
- Neil Jason – bass (2–9)
- Lucio Hopper – bass (10)
- Jonathan Moffett – drums (1)
- Yogi Horton – drums (2–7, 9, 10)
- Rick Marotta – drums (8)
- Errol "Crusher" Bennett – percussion (10)
- Bill Reichenbach Jr. – string arrangements (1)
- Paul Riser – string arrangements (6, 8, 9), rhythm arrangements (8)
- Randy Brecker – horn arrangements (9)

== Production ==
- Producers – Michael Jackson (Track 1); Diana Ross (Tracks 2–10).
- Engineers – Ross Pallone and Tom Perry (Track 1); Larry Alexander (Tracks 2–10).
- Assistant engineer on tracks 2–10 – Dave Greenberg
- Track 1 recorded at Hollywood Sound Recorders (Hollywood, CA); Tracks 2–10 recorded at the Power Station (New York, NY).
- Mastered by Ted Jensen at Sterling Sound (New York, NY).
- Cover art – Andy Warhol Edited and produced by Stuart Kusher

== Charts ==
=== Weekly charts ===
| Chart (1982–83) | Peak position |
|---|---|
| Australian Albums (Kent Music Report) | 84 |
| Canada Top Albums/CDs (RPM) | 44 |
| Dutch Albums (Album Top 100) | 14 |
| Finnish Albums (Suomen virallinen lista) | 8 |
| Norwegian Albums (VG-lista) | 12 |
| Swedish Albums (Sverigetopplistan) | 11 |
| UK Albums (Official Charts) | 33 |
| US Billboard 200 | 27 |
| US Top R&B/Hip-Hop Albums (Billboard) | 5 |
| US Cashbox Top Pop Albums | 20 |

=== Year-end charts ===
| Chart (1983) | Position |
|---|---|
| US Top R&B/Hip-Hop Albums (Billboard) | 44 |

== Certifications ==
| Region | Certification | Certified units/sales |
|---|---|---|
| United Kingdom (BPI) | Silver | 60,000^{^} |
| United States (RIAA) | Gold | 500,000^{^} |
^{^} Shipments figures based on certification alone.
