= Elton John: The Classic Years =

Remastering series of Elton John albums

Elton John: The Classic Years (known in North America as Elton John: The Remasters) is a series of remasters of English musician Elton John's albums, covering most of his studio and live albums originally released between 1969 and 1992. Many of the remastered studio albums include bonus tracks, some of which had been B-sides or unreleased tracks, or had previously appeared on compilations such as Rare Masters and the box set To Be Continued..., while the live album Here and There was greatly expanded from its original running time.

The first batch of albums (which were also released in a limited-edition velvet box, bearing John's signature) was released in 1995 and includes:

- Empty Sky
- Elton John
- Tumbleweed Connection
- 17-11-70
- Madman Across the Water
- Honky Château
- Don't Shoot Me I'm Only the Piano Player
- Goodbye Yellow Brick Road
- Caribou
- Captain Fantastic and the Brown Dirt Cowboy
- Rock of the Westies
- Here and There

The second batch of albums was released in 1998, and includes:

- Blue Moves
- A Single Man
- Too Low for Zero
- Ice on Fire
- Live in Australia with the Melbourne Symphony Orchestra
- Reg Strikes Back
- Sleeping with the Past
- The One

Of the albums not included in the series, Victim of Love, 21 at 33, The Fox, Jump Up! and Breaking Hearts were eventually remastered and re-released of their own accord in 2003. Leather Jackets, long touted by John as his least favourite of his albums, last appeared on CD in 1992 and was released digitally in 2007. It was eventually remastered in 2023.

== Bonus track listings ==
Empty Sky

- "Lady Samantha"
- "All Across the Havens"
- "It's Me That You Need"
- "Just Like Strange Rain"

Elton John

- "Bad Side of the Moon"
- "Grey Seal" (original version)
- "Rock and Roll Madonna"

Tumbleweed Connection

- "Into the Old Man's Shoes"
- "Madman Across the Water" (original version)

Honky Château

- "Slave" (alternate take)

Don't Shoot Me I'm Only the Piano Player

- "Screw You (Young Man's Blues)"
- "Jack Rabbit"
- "Whenever You're Ready (We'll Go Steady Again)"
- "Skyline Pigeon" (piano version)

Caribou

- "Pinball Wizard"
- "Sick City"
- "Cold Highway"
- "Step into Christmas"

Captain Fantastic and the Brown Dirt Cowboy

- "Lucy in the Sky with Diamonds"
- "One Day at a Time"
- "Philadelphia Freedom"

Rock of the Westies

- "Don't Go Breaking My Heart" (with Kiki Dee) [UK/Europe only]
- "Planes" [US only]
- "Sugar On The Floor" [US only]

A Single Man

- "Ego"
- "Flinstone Boy"
- "I Cry at Night"
- "Lovesick"
- "Strangers"

Too Low for Zero

- "Earn While You Learn"
- "Dreamboat"
- "The Retreat"

Ice on Fire

- "The Man Who Never Died"
- "Restless" (live 1984)
- "Sorry Seems to Be the Hardest Word" (live 1977; erroneously listed as "live 1984")
- "I'm Still Standing" (live 1984)

Reg Strikes Back

- "Rope Around a Fool"
- "I Don't Wanna Go On with You Like That" (Shep Pettibone Mix)
- "I Don't Wanna Go On with You Like That" (Just Elton and His Piano Mix)
- "Mona Lisas and Mad Hatters, Part Two" (The Renaissance Mix)

Sleeping with the Past

- "Dancing in the End Zone"
- "Love Is a Cannibal"

The One

- "Suit of Wolves"
- "Fat Boys and Ugly Girls"
