= So Close (Diana Ross song) =

Single by Diana Ross

from the album Silk Electric
- B-side: "Fool for Your Love"
- Released: January 7, 1983
- Recorded: 1982
- Genre: R&B; doo-wop
- Length: 4:12
- Label: RCA (US); Capitol (World)
- Songwriters: Bill Wray; Rob Mounsey; Diana Ross
- Producer: Diana Ross

Diana Ross singles chronology
"Muscles" (1982)	"So Close" (1983)	"Who" (1983)

"So Close" is a song by American singer Diana Ross from her thirteenth studio album Silk Electric (1982). The song was written by Bill Wray, Rob Mounsey and Diana Ross and produced by the latter.

The song was released as the album's second single on January 7, 1983 by RCA Records (US) and Capitol Records (internationally). In the US, for release on the single, the song was remixed by Richard Perry, with whom the singer had previously worked on the album Baby It's Me (1977). The song reached the top 40 on the Billboard Hot 100, becoming Ross' 23rd solo hit in the Top 40, also charting at number 76 on the Hot Black Singles chart.

== Critical reception ==
AllMusic called the song one of the best on the album. Billboard magazine wrote that the song evokes nostalgia for the 1950s. Daniela Soave of Record Mirror also called the track "nostalgic" with a "sugar coating", but not at all suitable for Ross, and also advised the singer to forget about producing. Cashbox magazine noted supremely synthesized R&B. Don Shewey from Rolling Stone highlighted the track against the background of the entire superficial album, noting the "snazzy vocals arranged by Luther Vandross".

== Track listing ==
7" single (US)
A. "So Close" – 3:48
B. "Fool for Your Love" (Bill Wray, Ray Chew, Diana Ross) – 3:47

7" single (World)
A. "So Close" – 4:12
B. "Fool for Your Love" – 3:47

== Personnel ==
- Diana Ross – vocals, production
- Rob Mounsey – arrangements, keyboards
- Luther Vandross – backing vocals, background vocal arrangements
- Tawatha Agee – backing vocals
- Cissy Houston – backing vocals
- Paulette McWilliams – backing vocals
- Neil Jason – bass
- Yogi Horton – drums
- Eric Gale – guitar
- Jeff Mironov – guitar
- Steve Goldstein – synthesizers

Credits are adapted from the album's liner notes.

== Charts ==
Chart performance for "So Close"
Chart (1983)	Peak position
Ireland (IRMA)	25
Luxembourg (Radio Luxembourg)	20
UK Singles (OCC)	43
US Billboard Hot 100	40
US Adult Contemporary (Billboard)	13
US Hot R&B/Hip-Hop Songs (Billboard)	76
US Cash Box Top 100	35
