= Roland MKS-20 =

Digital piano–type sound module

The Roland MKS-20 is a digital piano–type sound module released by Roland Corporation in 1986, simultaneously with the Roland RD-1000 digital stage piano. The MKS-20 and RD-1000 share the same "Structured/Adaptive Synthesis" sound engine; the RD-1000 integrates that engine into a musical keyboard-type MIDI controller with size, weight, and features similar to the Roland MKB-1000. Both the RD-1000 and MKS-20 feature eight keyboard sounds, including grand piano, electric piano, harpsichord, vibraphone, and clavinet. Both have three effects units built in: stereo chorus, stereo tremolo, and a three-band equalizer with a sweepable mid-range.

== Features ==
=== Structured / adaptive synthesis ===
Roland's structured/adaptive synthesis (SAS) has been described as a "sophisticated re-synthesis technique which involves a highly accurate computer analysis of 'real' sounds, from which a near replica can be synthesised." Roland engineers created samples of each of the 88 keys of various grand pianos, played at 128 different velocities (i.e. everything from very soft to very loud), and then did analysis of the waveform changes. The resulting algorithm of harmonic/velocity sound relationships was put on a VLSI chip.

Roland released the SAS system in Autumn 1986 with several different products, including:

- MKS-20 rack unit
- RD-1000 stage piano
- HP-5500/5600 home digital pianos

In 1990, Roland introduced "Advanced SA Synthesis" as the successor to SAS; Advanced SAS was discontinued in 1996 with the introduction of sample-based pianos.

=== MKS-20 rack unit ===
The MKS-20 has 16-voice polyphony, which means that 16 notes can be sounded simultaneously. It has eight presets for piano and other keyboard instruments (electric piano, harpsichord, vibraphone, clavinet), with 56 variations in total, seven for each preset. The first two piano sounds have been likened to a German grand piano sound; the third has been called similar to a Yamaha CP-70 or CP80's piano sound.

1. Piano 1
2. Piano 2
3. Piano 3
4. Harpsichord
5. Clavi
6. Vibraphone
7. E. Piano 1
8. E. Piano 2

The unit responds to velocity (hard or soft playing) when a MIDI controller keyboard that outputs velocity data is connected to it. The MKS-20 has a "voice preserve" feature which can be turned on or off. When voice preserve is on, the player can play a note or chord, and then while holding the notes down on the keyboard, switch to a new synth voice. Even though a new synth voice was selected, the original voice is sustained as long as the player holds down the original note or chord. Subsequent notes or chords use the newly selected voice.

It has three onboard effects units: stereo chorus effect with adjustable rate and depth, stereo tremolo with adjustable rate and depth, and equalizer. The three-band equalizer has bass (100 Hz) and treble (10 kHz) shelving controls and a parametric midrange control. The front panel has sliders, buttons, an alpha-dial for changing settings, a headphone jack, a port for plugging in a M-16C memory cartridge, and a MIDI message light, which flashes when the unit is sending it receiving MIDI messages. The back has 5-pin MIDI "in" and "thru" ports for connecting to a MIDI controller or to other MIDI gear (e.g., a music sequencer) and stereo 1/4" (600 ohm) and XLR outputs for plugging into a keyboard amplifier, PA system, or recording system.

The back also has a three-position output level switch which only affects the unbalanced 1/4 outputs. The high level output is for recording applications. The low or medium level are for guitar amplifiers. The medium or high level are for keyboard amplifiers. When connecting the unit to an audio mixer, either of the three level settings can be used. It weighs 8 kg (17 lb 10 oz) and uses the standard 19-inch rack size, occupying 2U with a nominal height of 90 mm (3.5 in). The MKS-20 uses CEM3360 dual voltage controlled amplifier (VCA) integrated circuit chips. Inside the unit, there is a battery to power the memory unit. The battery needs to be replaced every five years by a qualified repair technician.

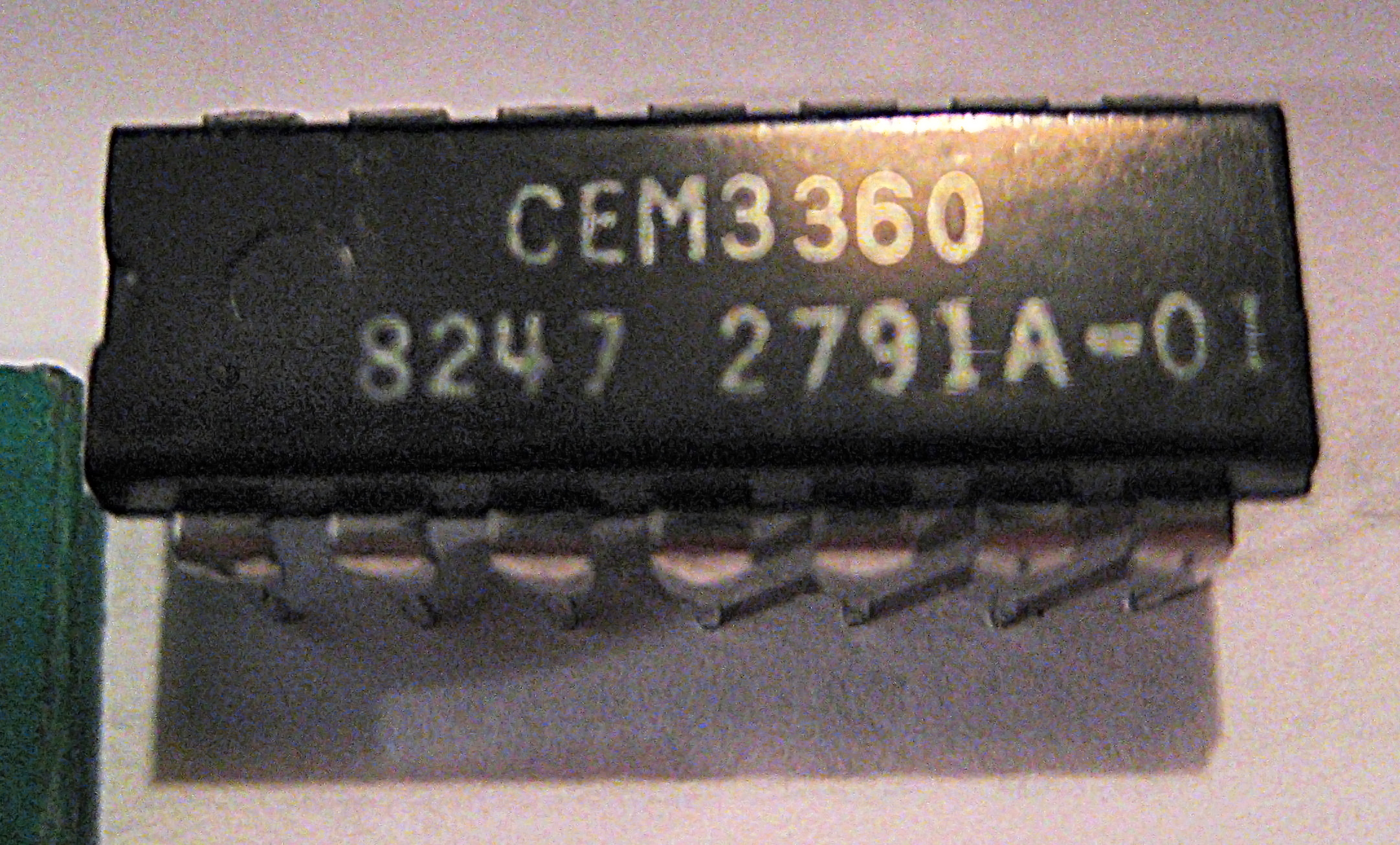
CEM3360 Dual VCA chips are used in the MKS-20.

The MKS-20 was part of Roland's "Mother Keyboard" modular MIDI system, which launched in 1984 with two keyboards (MKB-1000 and MKB-300) and three sound modules (MKS-10 "Planet-P" piano, MKS-30 "Planet-S" synthesizer, and MKS-80 "Super Jupiter").

=== RD-1000 keyboard ===
The RD-1000 has the same electronics and sound features as the MKS-20 mounted in an 88-note weighted MIDI controller keyboard, along with a keyboard stand and a floor unit to house the sustain pedal and a soft pedal. The keyboard alone weighs 43.5 kg (96 lb); the floor pedal unit is 8.5 kg (19 lb), and the heavy duty stand is another 29 to 39 lb (13 to 18 kg), depending on which stand is used. The settings offer keyboard touch response changes, which are called A, B, C and D. B is the default value, under which the shift in dynamics and harmonic structure increases in a linear way with the amount of velocity applied to a key. With setting A, there is a more subtle increase in volume and less change of timbre. With the settings C and D, the changes are more dramatic.

The same S/A Synthesis sound engine was applied to lighter stage pianos released in 1986 (RD-200, 76 keys; RD-300, 88 keys), which weighed 16 and 27.2 kg (35 and 60 lb), respectively. That technology was extended to home digital pianos in 1987 (HP-5600S, -5500S, -4500S, and -3000S), all 88-key units which were distinguished by built-in speaker configuration and finish, weighing between 39 and 93 kg (86 and 205 lb) for the -3000S and -5500/5600S, respectively, including the stand for the 5500/5600. The smaller stage pianos were updated with a hammer-action keyboard as the RD-250S and -300S in 1987; similarly, Roland introduced updated home pianos (HP-3500S/-4000S/-5000S) in 1988.

=== Rhodes MK-80 ===
Following Roland's acquisition of the Rhodes brand in 1987, the company released the 88-key Rhodes MK-80 in 1989 alongside a 64-key version with a reduced feature set, the MK-60. These instruments were derived from the MKS-20/RD-1000 architecture; like the earlier instruments, the MK-80/-60 have eight tones, but these included three Rhodes emulation patches ('Classic', 'Special', and 'Blend') and one DX-type patch ('Contemporary'):

1. Classic
2. Special
3. Blend
4. Contemporary
5. Acoustic Piano 1
6. Acoustic Piano 2
7. Clavi
8. Vibraphone

The Rhodes MK-80 featured additional configurations that were not available on the MKS-20, like the ability to change the punch, tightness, body and brightness of the sound. These parameters affected the amplitude relationships of the 10 parts used for additive sound synthesis. In addition to the equalizer, chorus and tremolo, the MK-80 also featured a stereo phaser effect, implemented using two IR3R05 OTA chips, the same ones used in the JX-8P synthesizer.

Although contemporary reviewers stated the MK-80's 'Classic' tone "managed to capture the essence of the original Rhodes sound, that special mixture of clarity and fullness, right across the range" and described it as "an unadulterated Rhodes voice straight out of the history books", Harold Rhodes himself did not approve of the instrument, as it did not use the electro-mechanical sounding scheme he had invented, and therefore the MK-80 is not considered part of the classic canon of Rhodes pianos. Roland went on to release several digital pianos and synthesisers under the Rhodes brand.

== Implementation ==
While having different configuration and ROM content, most models featuring structured/adaptive synthesis use a similar electronic circuit to generate sounds, on a PCB called CPU-B board.

The CPU-B board is based around an Hitachi HD6303R CPU, which interacts with three custom chips of the gate array type, manufactured by Fujitsu. The CPU receives commands through an 8-bit bus, and it's able to handle MIDI-like data. The three custom chips handle envelopes, address generation and voices summing respectively. The system effectively implements a wavetable player, able to playback 160 voices at the same time, 10 for each note. For each voice the CPU controls amplitude, pitch and wavetable address.

Every time a note is played, the system reconstructs the piano timbre by layering 10 waveforms played from a ROM chip and modulating their amplitude in time. Some employed waveforms are single-cycle (such as sine waves), while others are short attack sounds. This sound generation method is very similar to additive synthesis.

Some techniques used in the MKS-20, like the use of short attack samples and storing waveforms in an exponential format, were reused shortly after for the development of the Roland D-50 and the MT-32.

== History and reception ==
When Roland introduced the structured adaptive synthesis system, Sound on Sound says musicians viewed it as a "revelation". In 1986, pianists seeking a digital piano sound often used sampled pianos. While an individual note on a sampled piano might sound realistic, the samples might not include different dynamics and articulations. The MKS-20 offered "...more than 30 keyboard 'zones' differentiated not just by pitch and brightness, but also by individual formant structures and string enharmonicities", creating a piano sound that was "...far superior to any straightforward sample-replay system" available in 1986. Musicians found that they could "...recreate acoustic and electronic pianos on a range of stage instruments".

Pianoteq software (2006) and the Roland V-Piano (2009) take a similar approach as SAS by using computer models of physical instruments, rather than relying on samples.

== Digital instrument versions ==
In 2016, Fait Clic released a Windows-based Virtual Studio Technology (VST) recreation of the MKS-20, called MKS-20Vst for Windows. The program has a graphical user interface (GUI) which resembles the MKS-20's front panel. It also recreates Roland's chorus effect, the SDD 320 (also called "Dimension D" chorus).

In 2017, VGSG Music released a digital version called iKS20 that makes MKS-20's sounds available on Yamaha's MOXF, MOTIF XF, MONTAGE and MODX synthesizers. These Yamaha keyboards need a 1GB USB flash drive to load the iKS20 file. Additional requirements include the installation of the Yamaha FL1024M 1GB Flash Expansion Board for the MOXF and MOTIF XF. And 1GB of free space for the MONTAGE and MODX's onboard Flash RAM.

Keyscape's Collector Keyboards, a virtual instrument, includes a digital recreation of the MKS-20 in its list of over 500 sounds, 36 instrument models and hybrid “duo” patches. The Keyscape virtual instrument uses multisampled sounds and requires 77 GB to download or the purchase of boxed USB drives. The MKS-20 patch includes controls for effects.

Loot Audio produces a digital version called RP-86. It has two MKS-20-inspired piano sounds, which can be used in Native Instruments' Kontact 5 system. It is not a sample; instead it is a re-synthesis which resembles the original. The MKS-20 sounds are bundled with a number of other 1980s-era sounds.

In 2025, the custom chips used in the MKS-20 and other SAS models were reverse-engineered by software engineer Giulio Zausa, and a very accurate open source emulation was added to MAME.

== Notable users ==
- Tony Banks uses an MKS-20 piano module to duplicate his Yamaha DX7, with chords played on a Kurzweil K1000PX.
- Thomas Dolby uses the Roland MKS-20 piano module along with a Fairlight Series III and a Roland Super Jupiter synth.
- Elton John was a notable user of both the MKS-20 and the RD-1000 in the late 1980s, featuring heavily on the albums Reg Strikes Back and Sleeping With The Past (the instrument is directly credited on the latter album)
- Mike Lindup from Level 42 uses an MKS-20 alongside a range of other Roland gear.
- Brent Mydland from the Grateful Dead used an MKS-20 as his primary digital piano from 1987 to 1990, controlled through a Kurzweil Midiboard
- Paul Sidoti (Taylor Swift)
- Joe Phillips used the MKS-20 for Barney & Friends.
- Annie Hogan used a RD-1000 on Marc Almond The Stars We Are LP.
