= Pianoteq =

Piano synthesis software

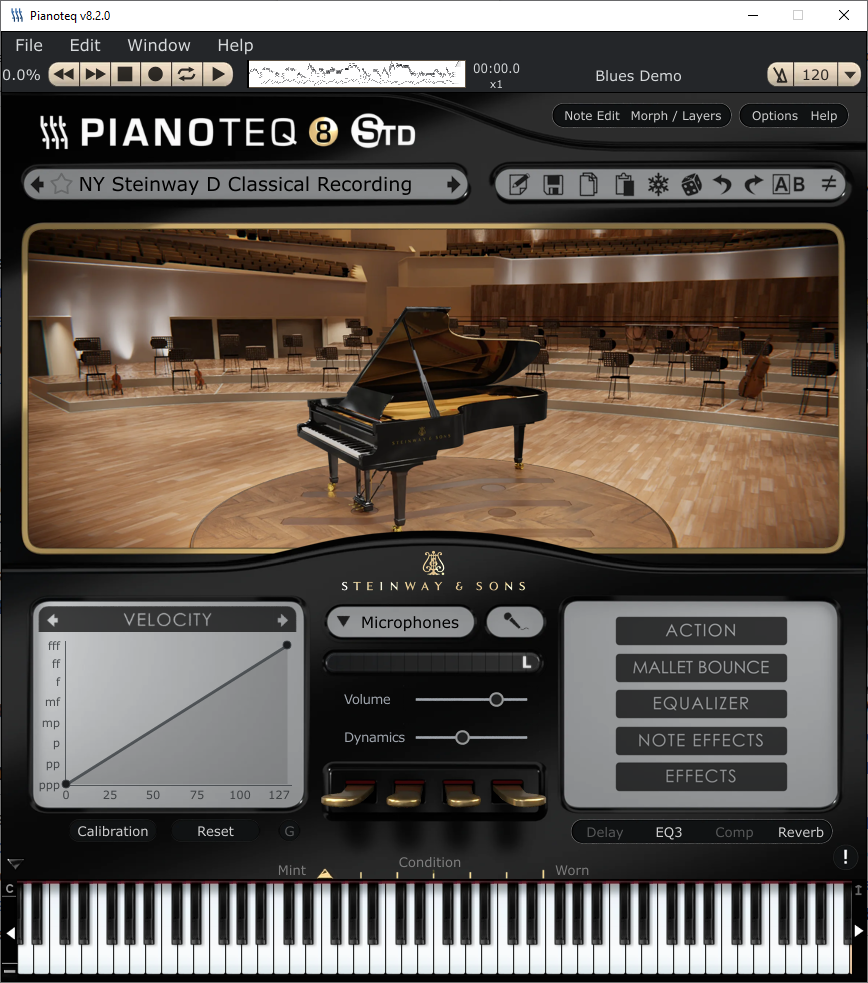
- Pianoteq 8.2 Standard running on Windows 10
- Developer: Modartt Software
- Stable release: 9.2.1 / June 11, 2026; 59 days ago
- Platform: Linux, Mac OS X, iOS, iPadOS, Windows
- Type: Software synthesizer
- License: Proprietary software
- Website: Pianoteq Homepage

Pianoteq is a software synthesizer that features real-time MIDI-control of digital physically modeled pianos and related instruments, including electric piano, harp, harpsichord, fortepiano, and various metallophones. It is usable as a stand-alone program for Microsoft Windows, Mac OS X, iOS, iPadOS and Linux (including ARM architecture) platforms, or as a plug in for VSTi hosts and two VSTi counterpart for use with digital audio workstations.

== History and technology ==
The original version of the program was released in August 2006. The software's physically modeled synthesis create sound from scratch using several megabytes of mathematical algorithms (Fourier construction) to generate electric piano and acoustic piano sounds that can be manipulated analogously to those produced by their material counterparts. Pianoteq's modeled sounds are supplemented with sampled pedal noise, key release, and hammer noise.

Patches for additional instruments are also available. Several of the historical instruments were created as part of the KIViR (Keyboard Instruments Virtual Restoration) project, which aims to create playable digital models of historical keyboard instruments in museums like the Händel-Haus in Halle.

== Instruments ==
Pianoteq models several modern as well as historical pianos, including the Steinway model B and model D, the Antonin Petrof 275 and 284, Bechstein DG, Steingraeber E-272, Grotrian Concert Royal, and Blüthner Model 1. Other instruments include models for the Hohner Pianet models N and T and Clavinet D6, as well as models for harpsichord, concert harp and Celtic harp, various tine and reed electric pianos, vibraphones, celeste, xylophone and marimba, and various steelpans.

== See also ==
- Physical modelling synthesis
- Digital piano
- Piano acoustics
