= Digital piano =

Musical instrument

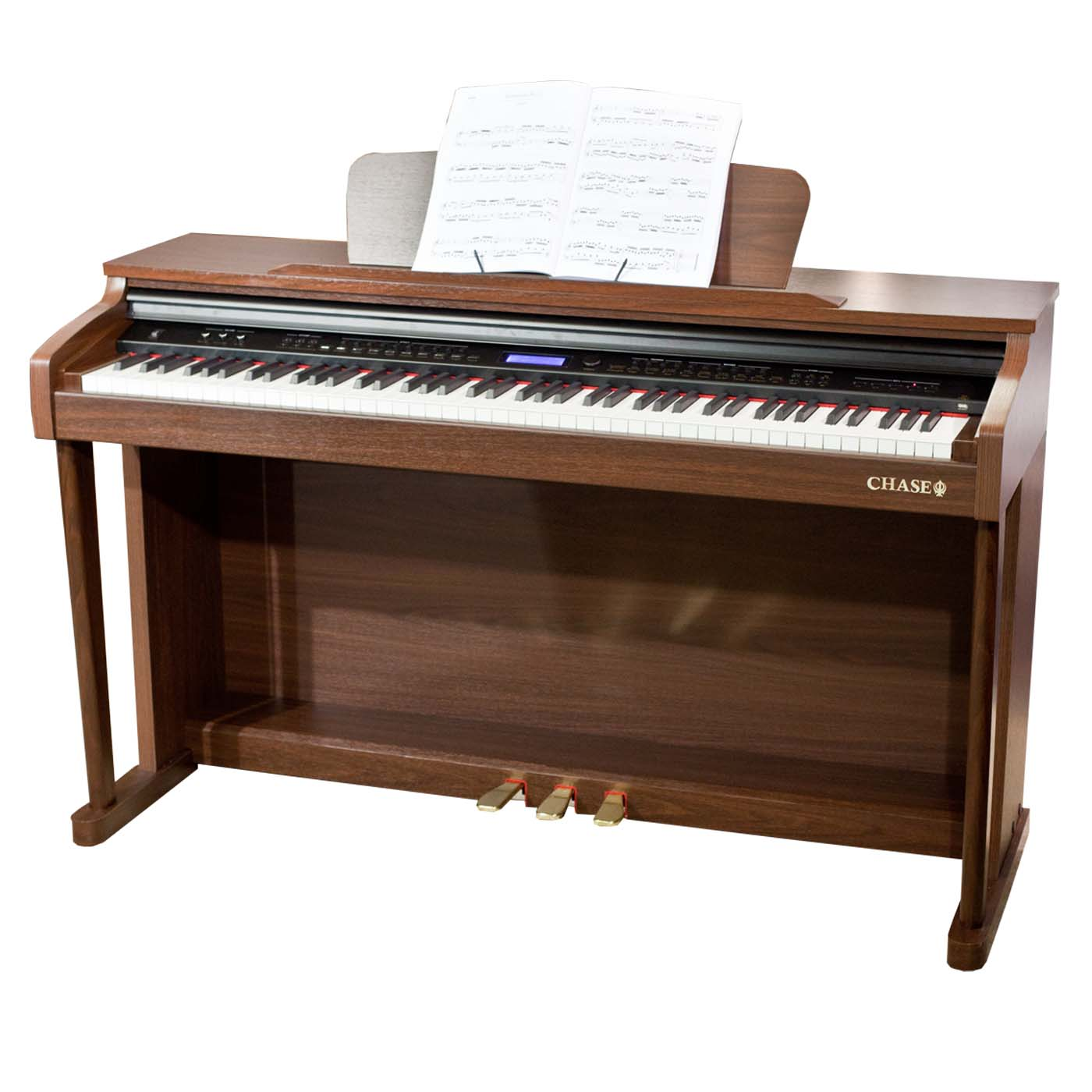
A digital piano in an upright piano form factor

A digital piano is a class of electronic keyboard or synthesizer (rompler) designed to serve primarily as an alternative to the traditional acoustic piano, both in how it feels to play and in the sound it produces. Digital pianos use either synthesized emulation or recorded samples of an acoustic piano, which are played through one or more internal loudspeakers. They also incorporate weighted keys, which recreate the feel of an acoustic piano. Some digital pianos are designed to also look like an upright or grand piano. Others may be very simple, without a stand.

While digital pianos may sometimes fall short of acoustic ones in feel and sound, their advantages include being smaller, weighing much less, and costing less than an acoustic piano. In addition, they do not need to be tuned, and their tuning can be modified to match the tuning of another instrument (e.g. a pipe organ). Like other electronic musical instruments, they can be connected to an amplifier or a PA system to produce a sound loud enough for a large venue or, at the other extreme, may be heard through headphones only. Some digital pianos can emulate other sounds besides the piano, the most common ones being pipe organ, electric piano, Hammond organ, and harpsichord. Digital pianos are often used in music schools and music studios as a replacement for traditional instruments.

== Features ==
Similar to a traditional acoustic piano, the defining feature of a digital piano is a musical keyboard with 88 keys. The keys are weighted to simulate the action of an acoustic piano and are velocity-sensitive so that the volume and timbre of a played note depends on how hard the key is pressed.

1. Key; 2. Retaining hook; 3. Base; 4. Cam; 5. Hammer; 6. Hammer weight; 7. Sensor(s); 8. Pivot (for key)

Instruments with fewer keys, and those with keys that are unweighted (similar to electric organs and synthesizers) or not velocity-sensitive tend to be called electronic or digital keyboards rather than digital pianos. Instruments that less accurately simulate the feel of an acoustic piano may be described as semi-weighted, while those that are more accurate may be said to possess hammer action. Some digital pianos incorporate actual hammers to better simulate a grand piano's touch.

In a typical digital piano with hammer action, as the key (1) is depressed, a cam (4) underneath the key presses on one end of a hammer (5), lifting the hammer weight (6). A retaining hook (2) with a cushion is provided so the key does not rise above its resting position.

The shape, size, and weight of the hammer affects the touch of the key, as does the placement of the sensor(s) (7), pivots (8), and the design of the mechanical linkage between the key cam and the hammer. To make the keybed more compact, many digital keyboards use a pivot point in the rear and hammers underneath the keys, as illustrated.

Digital pianos typically use analog sensors for their keyboard action, as opposed to digital sensors of a regular electronic keyboard and synthesizer. These sensors work in a similar way to those in analog joysticks found on video game controllers, where velocity input is converted from the key movement as well, not just the initial pressure of the key sensor.

Other common features include:

- Volume control; line-out audio connections; headphone output
- Additional instrument sounds
- MIDI implementation (most provide General MIDI, which offers 128 instrument sounds and 9 drum kits)
- Features to assist in learning (such as illuminated keys) and composition (such as a built-in sequencer)
- Transposition

=== Piano emulation ===
Minuet in G minor (BWV Anh. 115) by Christian Petzold from the Notebook for Anna Magdalena Bach, played on a digital piano.

In general, digital piano are romplers, relying on digital pre-recorded sampling, by which acoustic piano sound samples are stored in a ROM. The samples are usually created using high-quality grand pianos, professional microphones, and high-quality preamps in a professional recording studio. Usually multiple samples are available for the same keystroke, attempting to reproduce the diversity of sounds heard on an acoustic piano. However, sample-based digital pianos have limitations on the faithfulness with which they simulate acoustic pianos. Because samples are taken for only a limited number of intensity levels, digital pianos usually lack the continuous timbral changes that characterize acoustic pianos. They may also lack the harmonic tones that result when certain combinations of notes are sounded, and the natural reverberation that is heard when an acoustic piano is played percussively. They often lack the incidental acoustic noises associated with piano playing, such as the sounds of pedals being depressed and the associated machinery shifting within the piano, which some consider a benefit. These limitations apply to most acoustic instruments and their sampled counterparts, the difference often being described as "visceral".

Many digital pianos, especially those that resemble acoustic pianos, have built-in pedals that function much as those on acoustic pianos. Commercially available pedal switches, commonly used for regular electronic keyboards, can also be used, especially on portable models. On an acoustic piano the sustain pedal lifts the dampers for all strings, allowing them to resonate naturally with the notes played. Only high-end professional digital pianos can reproduce this sympathetic resonance effect.

Earlier digital pianos, such as those produced in the 1990s, often had polyphony limited to 32 or 64 notes.

Some digital piano implementations, like Roland V-Piano, Yamaha MODUS, Casio Celviano Grand Hybrid, and the software-based Pianoteq use mathematical models based on acoustic pianos to generate sound, which brings the ability to generate sounds that vary more freely depending on how the keys have been struck, in addition to allow a more realistic implementation of the distinctive resonances and acoustical noises of acoustic pianos.

=== Other instruments ===
Most digital pianos can produce a variety of different piano timbres. For example, a digital piano may have settings for a grand piano, an upright piano, a tack piano, a harpsichord and various electric piano models such as Fender Rhodes, Yamaha CP70, Wurlitzer, Yamaha DX7, and Clavinet. It may also emulate other keyboard instruments, including pipe organ, electric organ, and clavichord. Some digital pianos also incorporate other basic "synthesizer" sounds such as guitars, bass guitars, bowed string instruments, brass instruments, woodwinds, percussion, and drums. Some digital pianos also offer preset accompaniment rhythms ("styles" or "patterns"), a function commonly seen in conventional electronic keyboards.

=== MIDI features ===
Digital pianos usually offer a MIDI connection, allowing them to control or be controlled by other electronic instruments and sequencers. They may also have an external storage slot to save and load MIDI data, which the piano can play automatically, allowing it to function as a player piano. Some have a built-in sequencer to aid in composition.

Most digital pianos can be connected to a computer. With appropriate software such as scorewriters, digital audio workstations and sequencers, the computer can handle sound generation, mixing of tracks, music notation, musical instruction, and other music composition tasks.

== Form factors ==
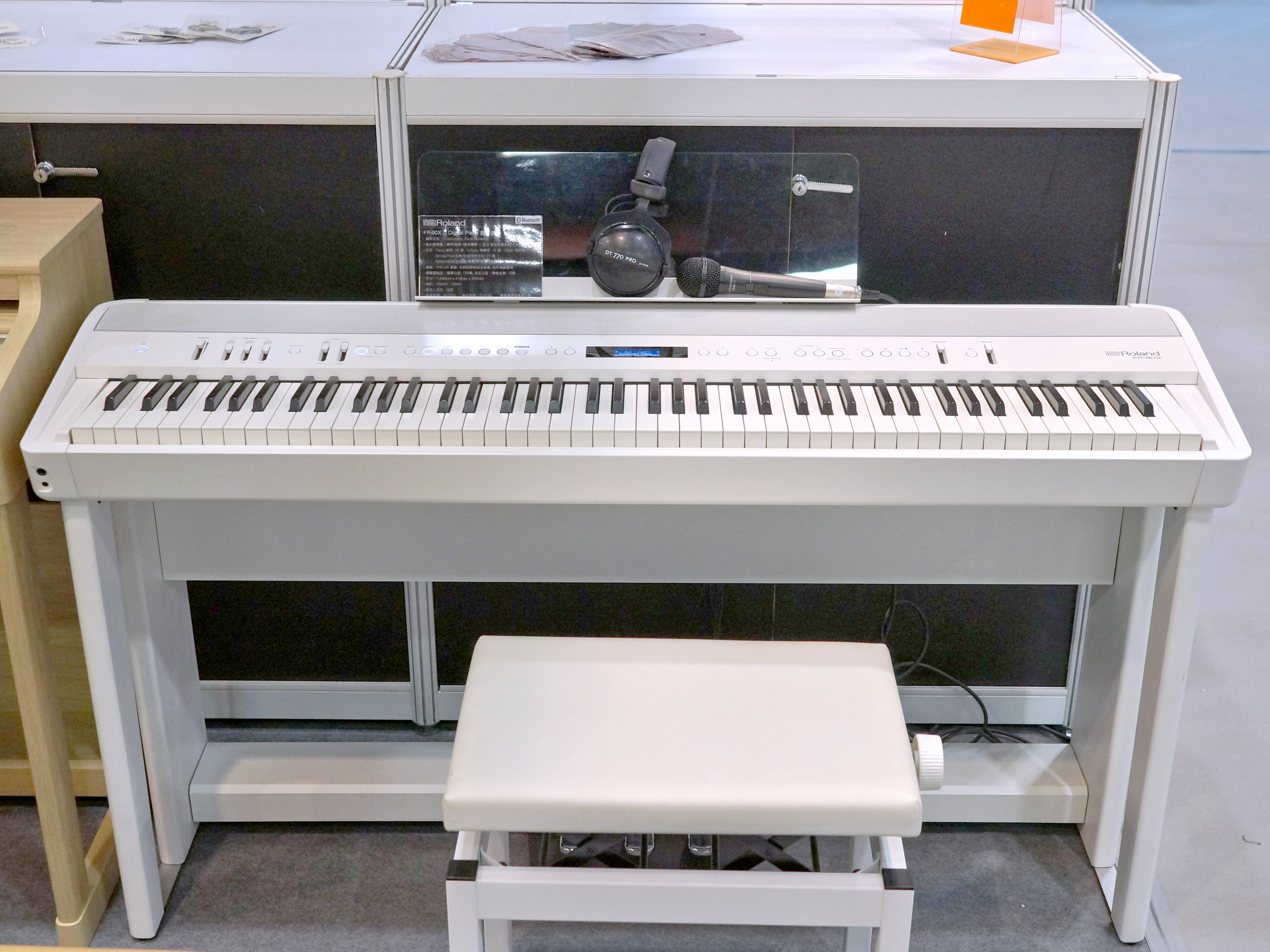
"Modern" traditional (Roland FP-90X)

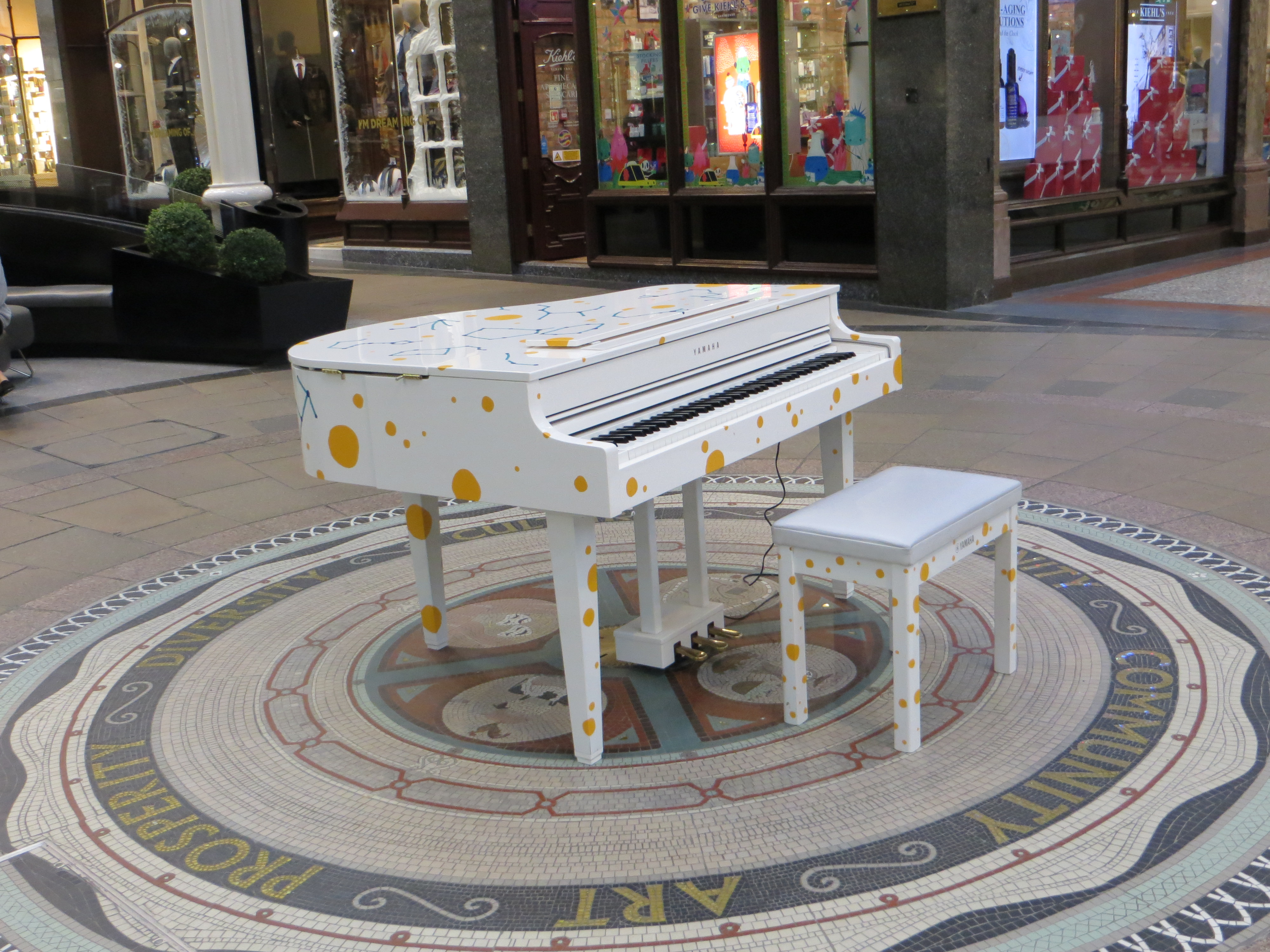
Digital grand (Yamaha)

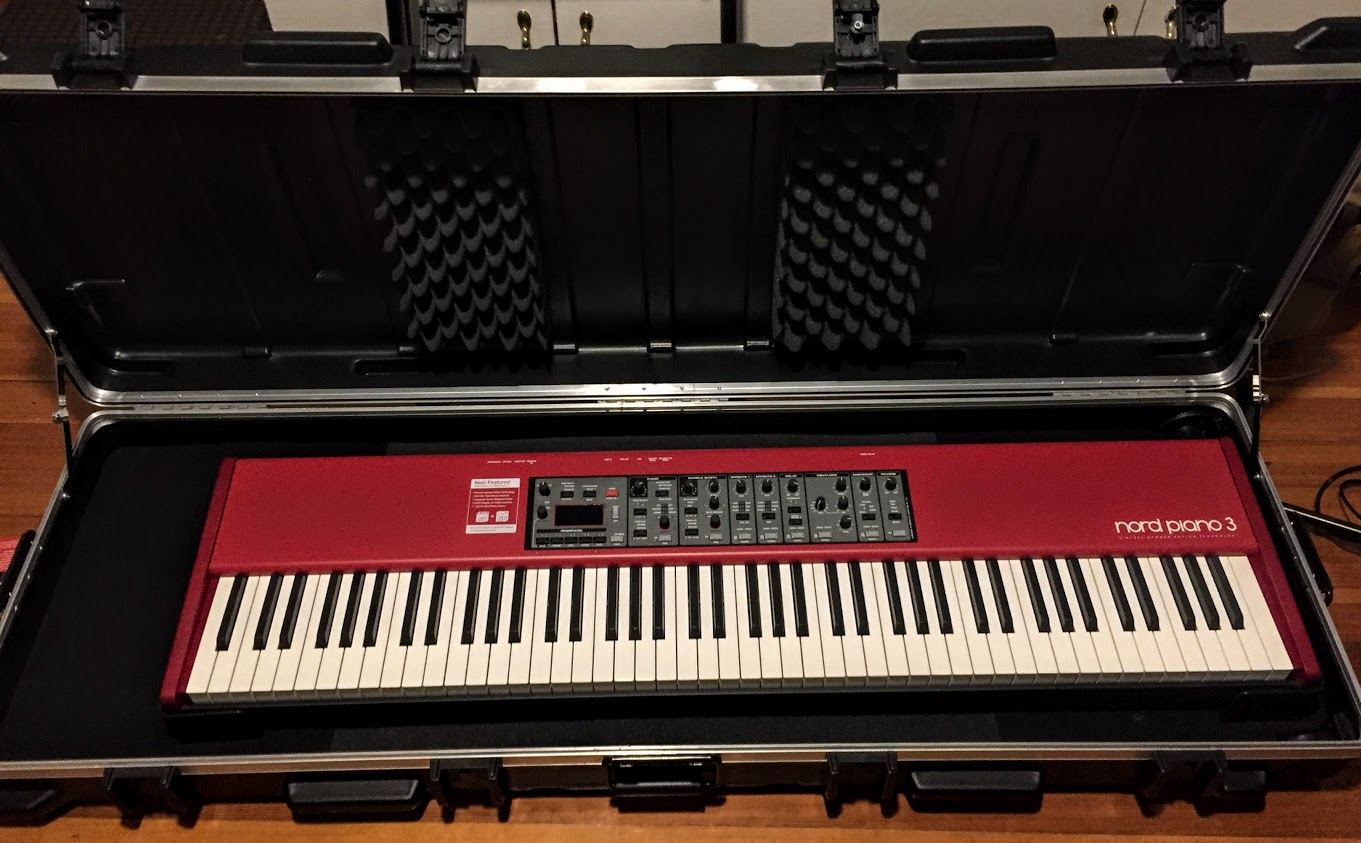
Stage piano, in case (Nord Piano 3)

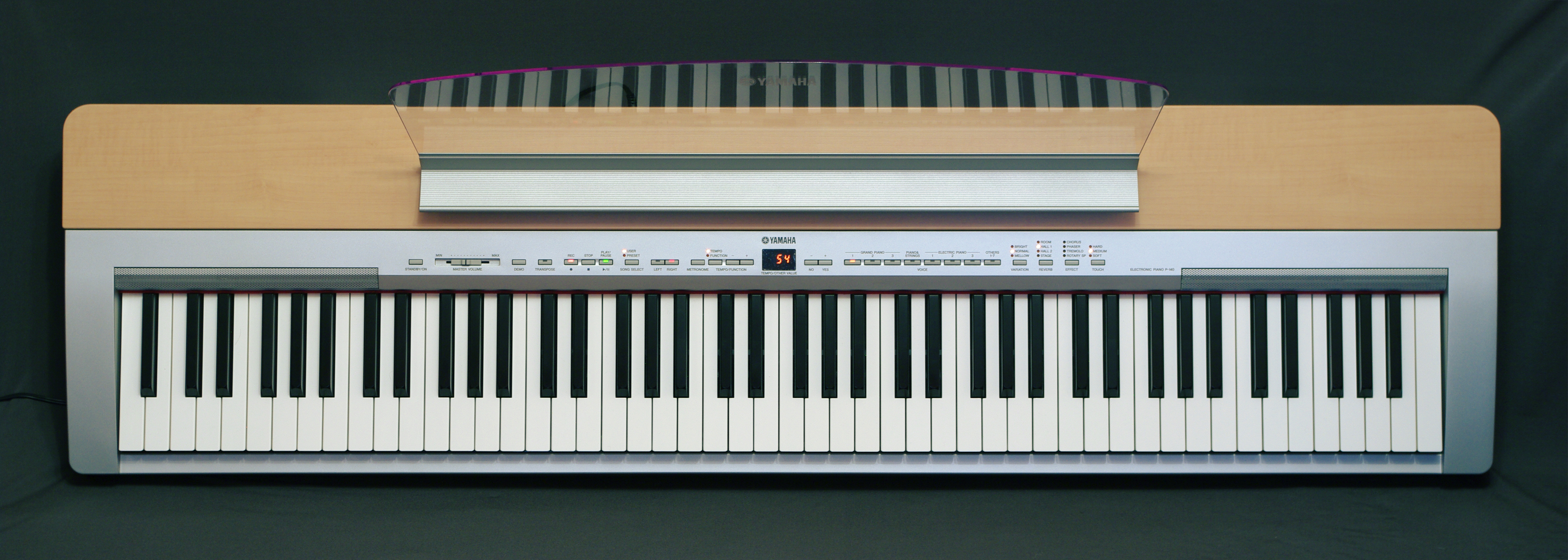
Portable (Yamaha P-140S)

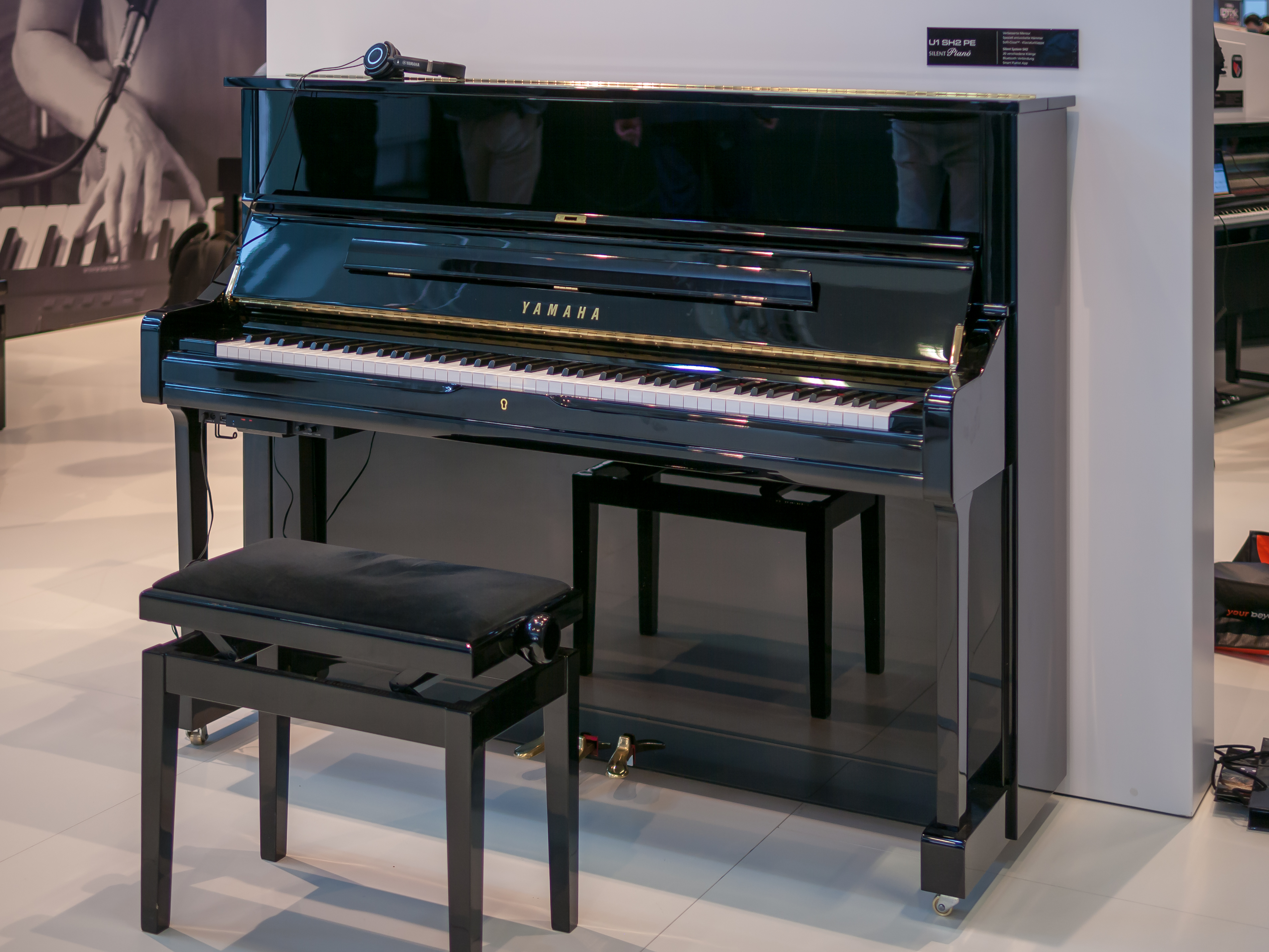
Hybrid (Yamaha U1 SH2)

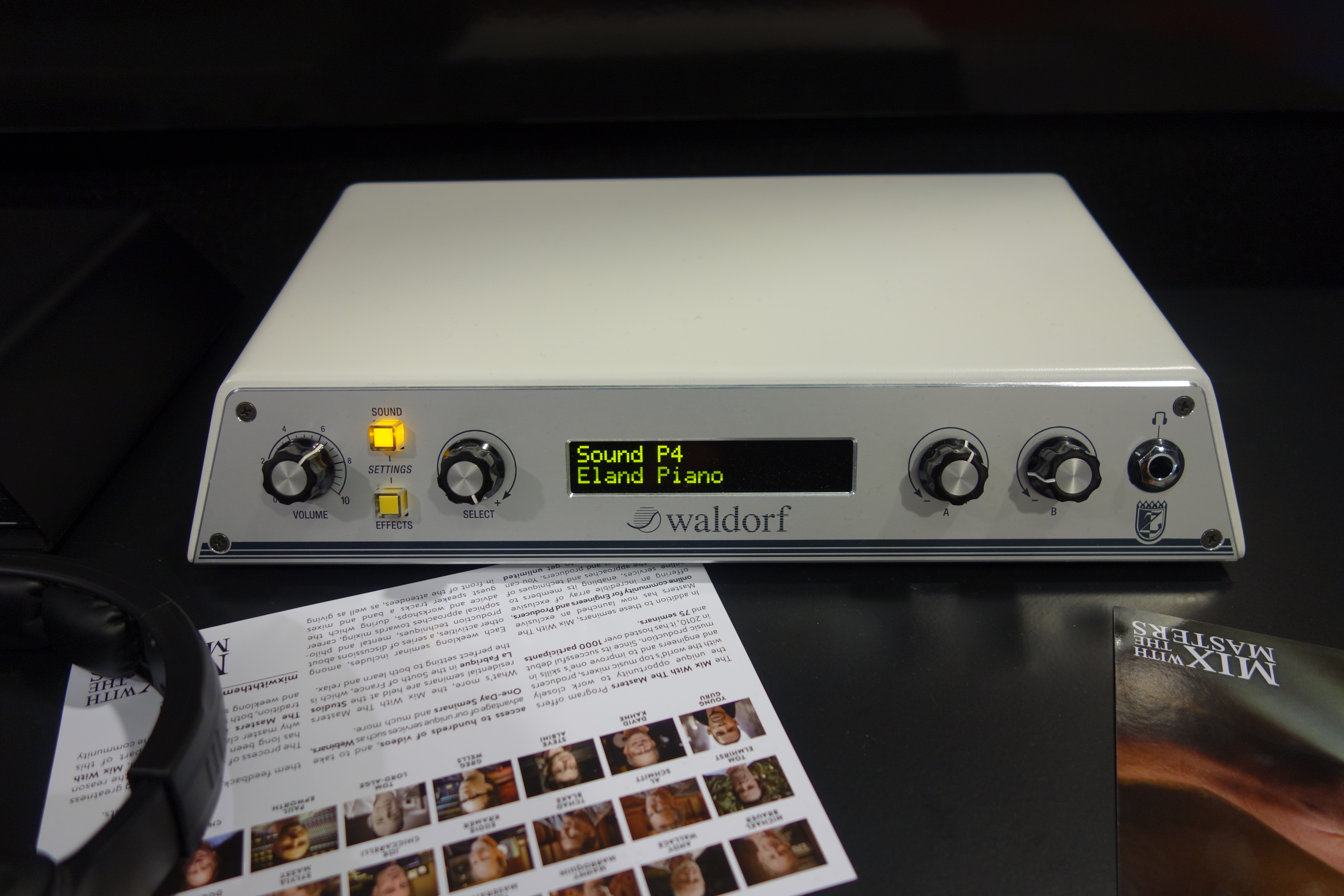
Piano module (Waldorf Zarenbourg)

The physical form of a digital piano can vary considerably.

=== Traditional type ===
Traditional digital pianos are designed to resemble the console of an electronic organ or a spinet harpsichord but usually having a stand rather than fully enclosed lower section. Some models are based on the casework of traditional upright pianos with a fully enclosed bottom part and metallic weighted sustain and soft pedals that resemble traditional piano pedals. An opposite and 2000s-era trend is to produce an instrument which has a unique and distinctive appearance, unobtainable with a conventional wooden-cabinet instrument. These instruments have a modern appearance, with a sleek plastic cabinet that makes no attempt to emulate traditional instruments. Yamaha, Kawai and Casio make models which are designed to stand against a wall and are far shallower from keyboard to back than any possible acoustic upright design, as well as a shorter height.

Traditional digital pianos, due to their form, offer less portability than the other types, and are mainly designed for use in a single place (e.g. home, classrooms or studios), and are not intended for mobility such as on stage or for live performance.

=== Upright type ===
These are a sub-type of traditional digital pianos that offer a more classical design which closely resemble an acoustic upright piano. The most expensive models may appear similar in their outer appearance and height to a full-size upright piano. Upright digital pianos are mainly intended for home use and are usually more expensive than the other types, due to the expensive wooden case. Some models, especially the higher-end, more expensive ones, often use wooden keyboards, as opposed to regular plastic keyboards.

=== Grand type ===
An uncommon form of digital piano that resembles a grand piano, usually with a more precision keyboard action and high-quality sound system built into the unit's cabinet in a similar manner as the strings on a grand piano. These pianos are mostly high-end novelty models offered by only small number of manufacturers, and often have higher prices than an average acoustic piano.

=== Stage piano ===
Another common form is the stage piano, designed for use with live performances, professional audio, or in a recording studio. This type of digital piano normally makes no attempt to imitate the physical appearance of an acoustic piano, rather resembling a generic synthesizer or music workstation. A distinguishing feature of most stage pianos is a lack of internal loudspeakers and amplification - it is normally assumed that a powerful keyboard amplifier or PA system will be used. However, some stage pianos are equipped with powered speakers.

=== Portable type ===
Yet another form is the portable digital piano which often combines the capabilities of stage pianos, but with additional features similar to a conventional home keyboard. These digital pianos are mostly designed for various purposes such as home, studio, classroom, stage or personal use. It is similar in form to a stage piano, but much lighter in weight, and having a more compact size. Unlike stage pianos, portable digital pianos were commonly equipped with built-in amplification and loudspeakers, usually has lower cost than other types, and its sound quality was often comparable or similar to that of a conventional keyboards due to a simpler sound synthesis system, though some models, often utilize a similar sound generation system as the more advanced model lineups of the same manufacturer. Many of them also contain a wide assortment of sounds, like one would expect from an electronic keyboard, including sound effects and drum kits. Also like conventional keyboards, these digital pianos often feature an automated "rhythm section" function which is controlled by playing chords with the left hand.

Most portable digital pianos could be freely fitted in a regular keyboard stand like a stage piano, while some types also come equipped with a dedicated matching stand which, when assembled, will have a slight resemblance to a console digital piano.

Portable digital pianos, for the sake of lower production cost, were often equipped with a less complex system for the weighted keys. As a result, the feel of the keys is usually much less realistic than other digital pianos. However, it still retain the emulated weight mechanism (lower keys are heavier than higher ones), though not as precise as more expensive pianos, but far more true to life than a keyboard. Furthermore, certain models include synthetic ivory-like keys as opposed to standard plastic keys.

=== Hybrid type ===
Hybrids are a type of high-performance digital piano that incorporate actual piano action and high-quality modeled samples of an acoustic piano. This type of digital piano was first popularized by Roland in the 1980s, with their flagship stage piano at the time, RD-1000.

=== Piano module ===
There are also digital piano modules, which are simply keyboardless sound modules chiefly containing piano samples. To use these modules, they are typically connected to a MIDI controller keyboard, and the output signal from the module is plugged into a keyboard amplifier or PA system. One early example of a digital piano module is Roland's 1986 MKS-20 digital piano module.

Pianoteq is a software synthesizer which shares some characteristics with piano modules.

== Manufacturers ==
Well-known manufacturers of digital pianos include Dynatone, Casio, Clavia(nord), Dexibell, Kawai, Korg, Kurzweil, Orla, Roland, Suzuki, and Yamaha.

== See also ==
- Electronic keyboard
- Electric piano
- Electronic piano
- Scorewriter
- Synthesia
- Synthesizer
- Virtual piano
- Walking Piano
