= Jonathan Moffett =

American drummer (born 1954)

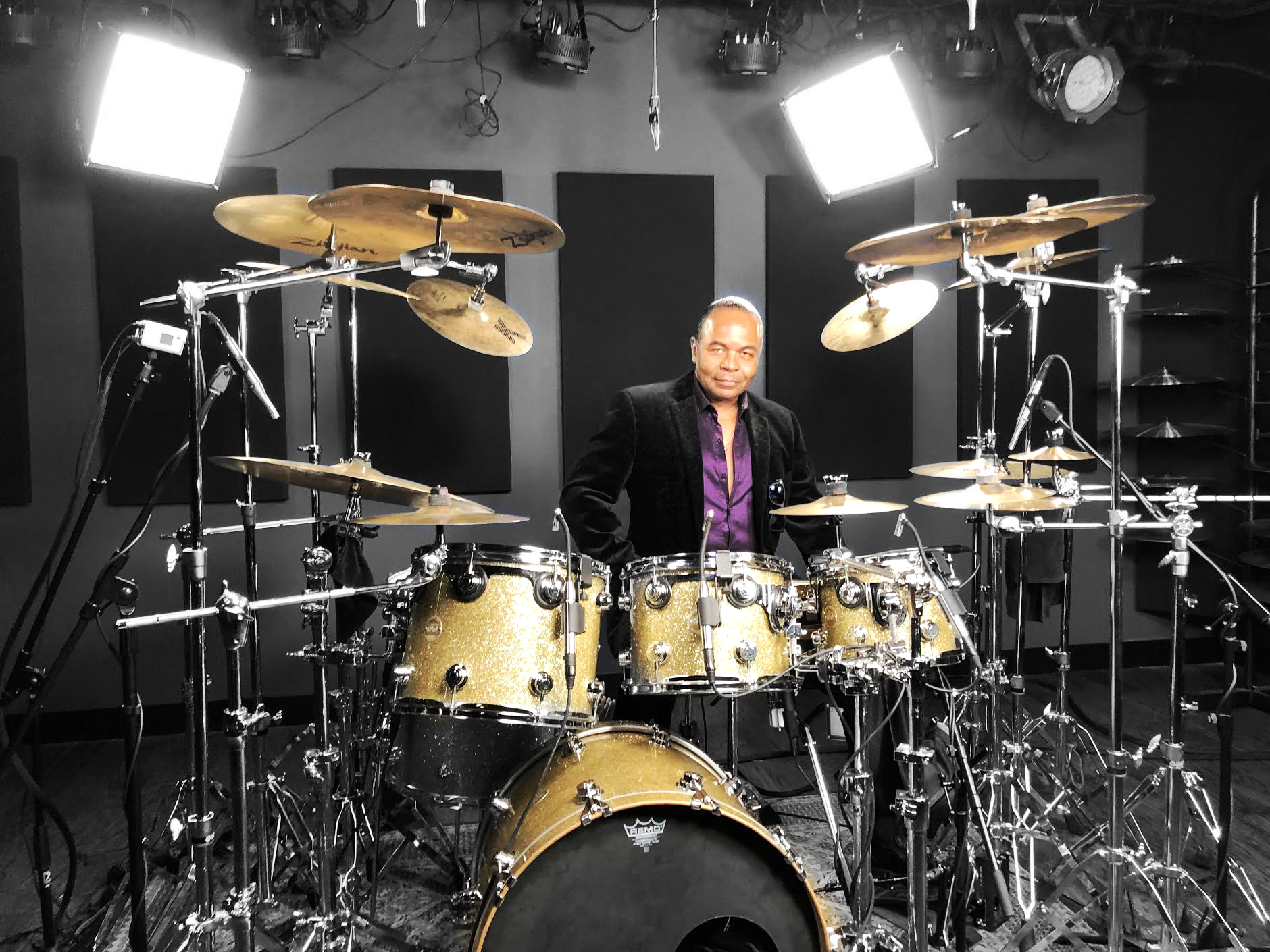
- Moffett behind a drum kit in 2018
- Born: Jonathan Philip Moffett; November 17, 1954 (age 71); New Orleans, Louisiana, U.S.
- Other names: Sugarfoot, Foot
- Occupations: Musician; songwriter; record producer
- Years active: 1979–present
- Spouse: Myra Hissami (m. 2021)
- Musical career
- Genres: Pop; R&B; funk; rock; heavy metal; new jack swing
- Instruments: Drums; percussion; vocals
- Label: Envision Entertainment
- Website: moffettstore.com

Signature
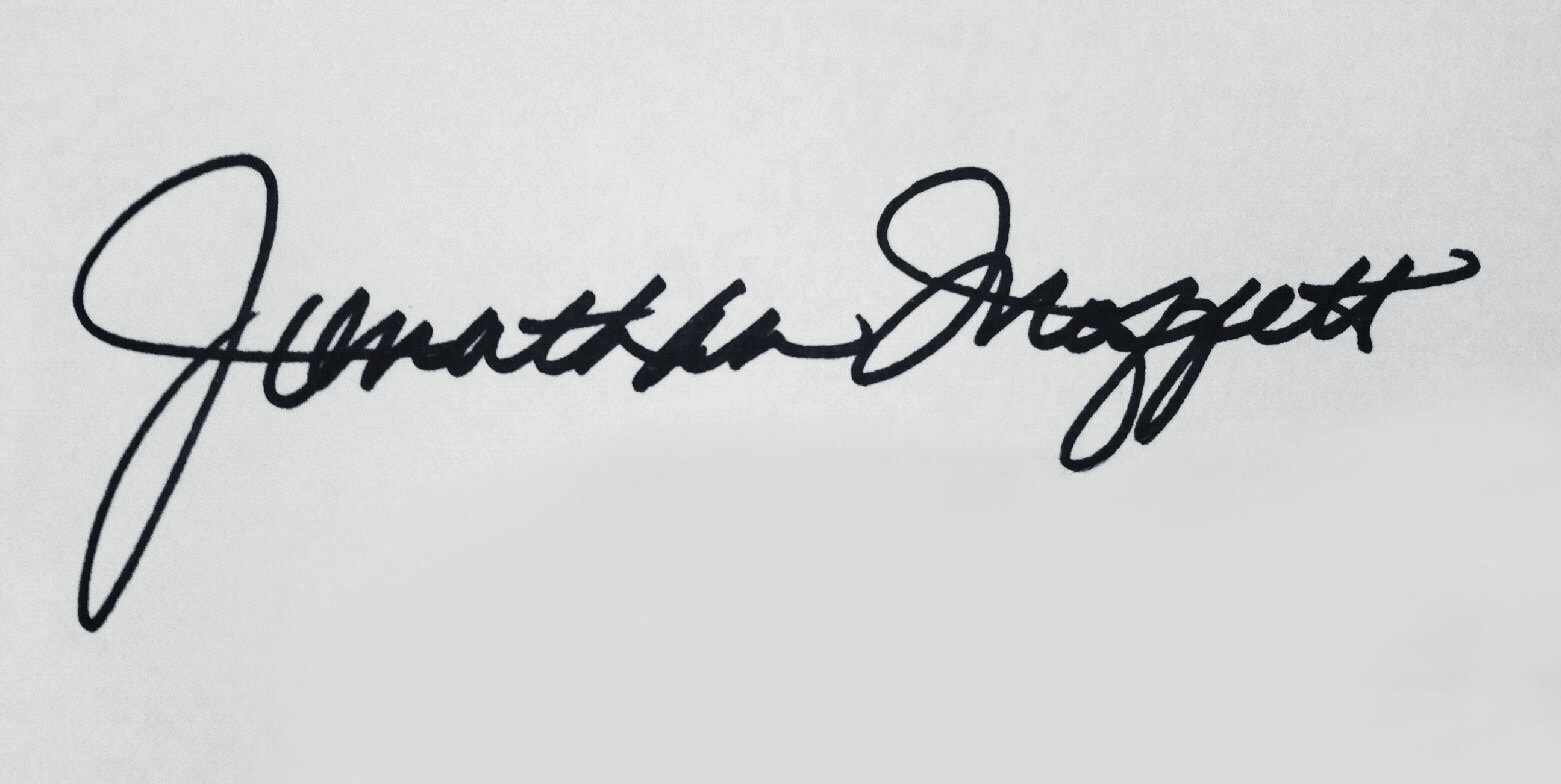

Jonathan Phillip "Sugarfoot" Moffett (born November 17, 1954) is an American drummer, songwriter and record producer from New Orleans, Louisiana. Beginning in 1979, Moffett collaborated with the Jackson family, particularly Michael Jackson, over the course of 30 years. More recently, he has worked with other notable artists and producers such as Madonna, George Michael, Elton John, Stevie Wonder, Quincy Jones and many others.

== Early life ==
Moffett is the third of a musical family of siblings. His two other brothers played the guitar and the bass guitar, while Jonathan's father encouraged him to drum. His influences are Ziggy Modeliste, Buddy Rich, Louis Bellson, Billy Cobham, James Brown, Stevie Wonder, Roger Taylor and other drummers, mostly originating from New Orleans.

He initially wanted to play the bass guitar long before drums. He was always acutely aware of the bass guitar parts in songs and mimicked them on the bass drum. Moffett was never musically trained and learned to play drums on his own by ear. He was nicknamed "Sugarfoot" for his quick, articulate, and pronounced bass drum work, which requires a lot of precision and stamina for a drummer. He plays 16th note, 32nd note, and 64th note figures energetically and fluidly within rhythms. Moffett started off his drumming career by performing locally with prominent bands within the region and at nightclubs as a young boy.

He came up with his kung-fu inspired signature moves during a marathon practice session late one evening—the "one-handed cymbal catch" and his "backlash-whiplash" cymbal crashes (single and/or double hand) where he places two cymbals behind him and crashes/chokes them without looking.

== Career ==
=== The Jacksons ===
Moffett's professional career initially started with the Jacksons. In 1979, through serendipity, he came across the Jacksons' musical director, James McField, who told him they were auditioning for a new drummer. Though the final auditions were that day, they extended it for him, knowing how eager he was to play for the group. According to an article by Robyn Flans in Drummer Magazine in September 1984, Moffett said:

He [McField] called that night and the audition was set for the next day. I was familiar with their songs [the Jacksons'] because I had grown up with their music, yet I didn't know everything about the music...After we finished a few songs, they pulled me aside and said they'd let me know something soon. That evening, I got the call and they said they wanted me to join the group. It was just a miracle.

His first major tour was the Destiny Tour (1979–1980). He used his "one-handed cymbal catch" frequently, in which Moffett explained to Zildjian:

With the Jacksons, I'll use it to accent certain moments before the vocal chorus. OR when Michael makes a move and stops real quick, I'll accent that with a catch. You've got to do it fast and drop back into the rhythm without breaking time.

He proceeded to perform on the Triumph Tour in 1981, which Rolling Stone later named as one of the best 25 tours of 1967 to 1987. Epic decided to have one of the shows from the tour recorded due to its immense popularity and success. Moffett also drummed around the United States and Canada for the record-breaking and famous Victory Tour (1984), where he met Madonna backstage who asked him to drum for her upcoming Virgin Tour (1985). The Victory Tour promoted Michael Jackson's albums Off the Wall (1979) and Thriller (1982) and was promoted by Don King. Moffett performed with Eddie Van Halen, who made a few special appearances on some of the shows playing "Beat It" on guitar. Prince complimented Moffett after many shows with the Jacksons (and did the same seeing him live with other artists). He'd nod his head, smile, and say, "That was bad, you're bad."

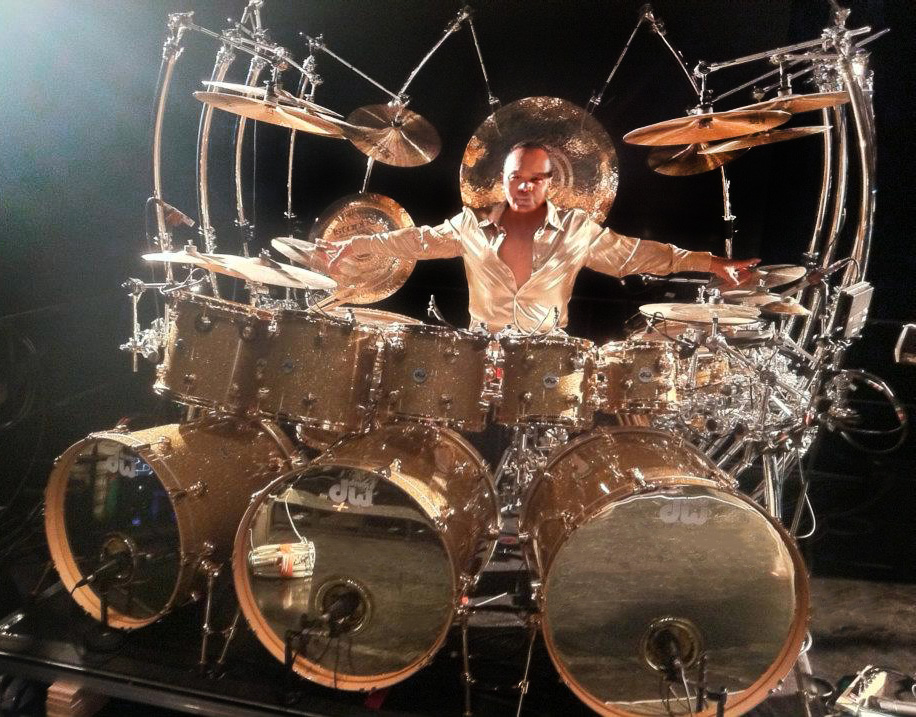
Moffett behind an extensive drum kit in 2013

When Moffett turned professional, he designed innovative futuristic drum kits for every tour to complement the stage design. His work with the Jacksons and unique drumming style led him to become one of the most in-demand pop music drummers and perform on 23 world tours.

Moffett was present during the infamous Pepsi commercial shoot in 1984 when Jackson suffered from second-degree burns from the blazing pyrotechnics. He noticed the flames on Jackson's hair at one point during the shoot and dropped his drum sticks and ran to help him just as some crew members did the same. He is credited for live drumming on The Jacksons Live! album (1981), which was RIAA-certified Gold. The double-disc album contains recordings of songs performed throughout the Triumph Tour. He also later recorded on the Jacksons' albums Victory (1984) and 2300 Jackson Street (1989).

=== Madonna ===
After they initially met during the Jacksons' Victory Tour, Moffett finally agreed to tour with Madonna on her debut tour, the Virgin Tour, alongside Victory Tour bandmate Patrick Leonard (musical director/keyboardist). The tour took place only in the U.S. and Canada. Moffett was featured in Madonna's 1985 "Dress You Up" music video, which was mostly concert footage of her performing the song during the Virgin Tour. With the success of the tour, which was also released as a video album, Madonna requested Moffett to accompany her on her second tour, the Who's That Girl Tour (1987). The tour took place on a global level and was a huge commercial success, superseding the first, and he continued touring with her on her controversial and groundbreaking Blond Ambition Tour (1990), which received accolades for its intricate choreography and stage production. That was followed by the 1991 film Madonna: Truth or Dare, in which Moffett features.

Moffett also played on three Madonna albums with producer Patrick Leonard—True Blue (1986), Like a Prayer (1989), and I'm Breathless (1990), recording drums, percussion, and background vocals on all three. He played with Madonna at Live Aid in 1985, performing songs such as "Holiday", "Into the Groove", and "Love Makes the World Go Round" with guest stars Nile Rodgers, Tom Bailey and Alannah Currie, and the Thompson Twins.

=== Others ===
Elton John turned to Moffett for his comeback Reg Strikes Back Tour (1988–1989), with a total of 87 shows, and which he utilized to fight bad press. Elton again hired Moffett for his Sleeping with the Past Tour (1989–1990), with a total of 74 shows. Moffett drummed on John's Sleeping with the Past (1989) album, which was John's best selling album in Denmark, where the album was recorded. It was more successful than the tour. The album was also John's first platinum album since 1983 with many hit singles. Moffett was also credited on To Be Continued—a four-disc box set, recorded on various locations between 1965 and 1991, that chronicled John's songs from his days with Bluesology to the present day, including newly recorded songs. He was also credited for live drumming on John's Duets album (1993) for the song "Don't Let the Sun Go Down on Me" which was recorded live with George Michael at Wembley Arena in 1991. He is also credited on Two Rooms: Celebrating the Songs of Elton John & Bernie Taupin (1991) and was additionally featured in the 1991 TV movie Two Rooms: A Tribute to Elton John & Bernie Taupin.

Michael called Moffett to tour with him on his Cover to Cover tour (1991). Totaling 29 shows, the tour took place in the United Kingdom, Brazil, Japan, Canada and the United States. Moffett also performed with Michael at the Rock in Rio II festival, which is a recurring music festival in Rio de Janeiro, Brazil.

He toured with Janet Jackson during the first leg of her janet. World Tour (1993–1995). The tour took place throughout North America, Europe, Asia and Australia.

=== Michael Jackson's solo career ===
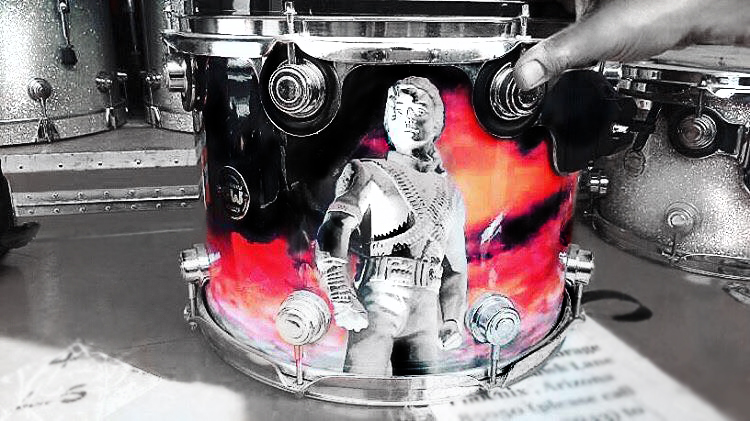
One of the toms from the HIStory World Tour drum kit Moffett owns

Moffett continued to perform with Michael Jackson throughout the duration of his solo career on various shows and tours, such as his third and final tour, the HIStory World Tour (1996–1997). He also drummed for the Michael Jackson: 30th Anniversary Celebration shows at the Madison Square Garden in New York City on September 7 and 10, 2001, and the United We Stand: What More Can I Give benefit concert led by Jackson himself in Washington, D.C. among several others on October 21, 2001.

Moffett drummed for the Michael Jackson: 30th Anniversary Celebration shows, which took place on September 7 and 10, 2001. The concerts aired as a two-hour television special on CBS, honoring Jackson's thirtieth year as a solo artist. The television special included footage from both shows. Moffett drummed with the rest of the band on the balcony right above the performers. Some of the guests and performers included Marlon Brando, Elizabeth Taylor, Macaulay Culkin, Slash, Liza Minnelli, Destiny's Child, Britney Spears, Gloria Estefan, Ray Charles, Chris Tucker, Usher and more. Jackson asked Moffett to collaborate on a song he wrote for Diana Ross titled "Muscles". Moffett played both drums and percussion on the track. The song was named after Jackson's pet snake and released in 1982. It was an instant hit and reached #10 on the Billboard Hot 100.

Moffett was supposed to perform on Jackson's This Is It concerts (2009–2010), rehearsing for months. The concerts were cancelled following Jackson's death on June 25, 2009, eighteen days before the first slated performance. He was featured in Michael Jackson's This Is It (2009) documentary motion picture film alongside many other concert films, shows, and documentaries. This Is It's worldwide gross revenue was $261 million, making it the highest-grossing concert film of all time. There are snippets of him drumming throughout the documentary as well as discussing the concert series that never came to be and his history with Jackson.

Though Moffett was known as "Sugarfoot" to the rest of the world, Jackson cut his stage name short and called him "Foot" instead. Moffett was Jackson's live drummer of choice from the beginning when he first started drumming with the Jacksons. Jackson always called him first for each tour and show, even when he was under contract with other artists. The two collaborated over the course of 30 years starting in 1979 to 2009 with a total of four tours together; This Is It would have been the fifth. Aside from working with Jackson, he was friends with him and hung out at the Jackson Estate (Hayvenhurst home) with the family (including Jackson family matriarch, Katherine Jackson, who he considers his "second mother") and one-on-one with Jackson at Neverland Ranch and his other homes. The two had drawing contests on the road when touring and Jackson sent him birthday and holiday cards when they were not together. Moffett was with Jackson the night before he died until 1 AM.

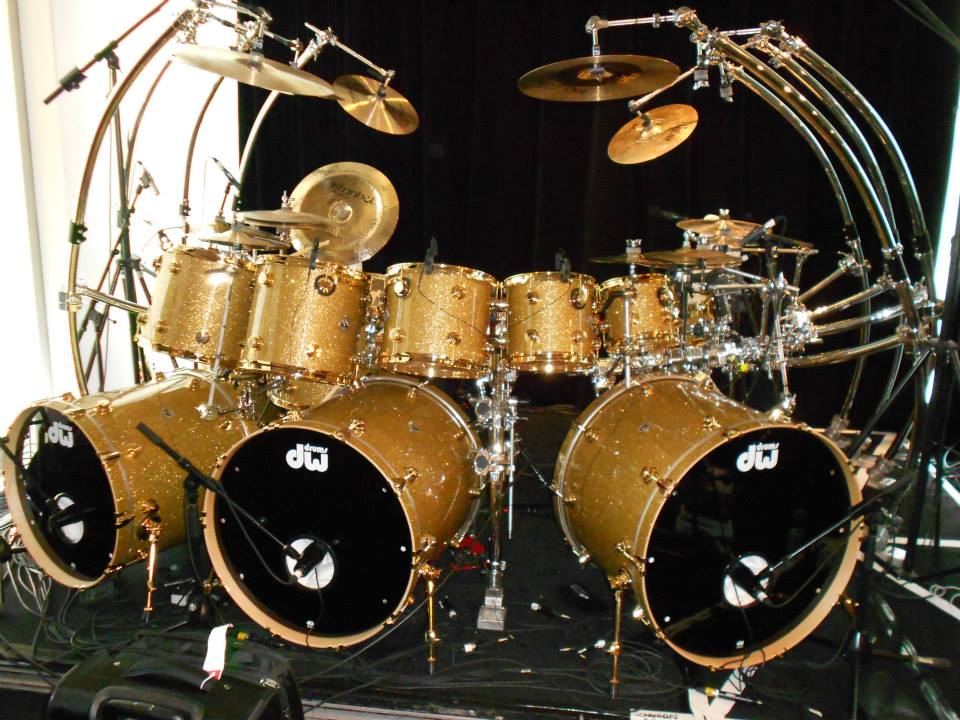
Moffett's gold drum kit

Moffett performed at the Staples Center during the Michael Jackson memorial service. Following Michael Jackson's passing, Moffett drummed around the world honoring the pop star with Cirque du Soleil's Michael Jackson: The Immortal World Tour (2011–2014). The tour is listed as one of the top-grossing tours of all time with a gross revenue of $360 million, totaling 501 shows at 157 venues in 28 countries worldwide. Moffett also performed at the Australian Music Show (AIMS) and hosted a drum clinic in which he performed ten Michael Jackson songs that were supposed to be performed during This Is It. Moffett was featured in Spike Lee's 2016 Michael Jackson's Journey from Motown to Off the Wall documentary, which was Lee's second documentary on Michael Jackson since Bad 25 (2012). The documentary was released with the reissue of the Off the Wall (1979) album. Moffett spoke of his initial audition with the Jacksons and early days with Jackson and the group.

== Equipment ==
Moffett is currently sponsored by Drum Workshop (DW), Remo Drum Heads, Empire Ear Monitors, Earthworks Microphones, Roland, Audeze Headphones, QSC and Gruv Gear. Over the years he has played a variety of cymbals including Zildjian and Istanbul Mehmet. Additionally he designed his own signature Jonathan Moffett Duo drum sticks in 1996 and designed his own cymbal called the Moffett "M" Series with Soultone when he endorsed them, but later had a falling out with the company. He is currently in the process of designing his own drum products and has an upcoming line of drum sticks out now called "Sweet Beats", which are sold on his web store, the Moffett Store. He is also designing his own tuning keys, which can be worn around the neck as jewellery.

== Awards ==
- Destiny (The Jacksons): RIAA Platinum Award (1978)
- "Shake Your Body (Down to the Ground)" (The Jacksons): RIAA Gold Award (1979)
- Triumph (The Jacksons): RIAA Platinum Award (1979)
- The Jacksons Live! (The Jacksons): RIAA Platinum Award (1981)
- Victory (The Jacksons): RIAA Platinum Award (1984)
- True Blue (Madonna): RIAA Platinum Award (1986)
- Sleeping with the Past (Elton John): RIAA Platinum Award (1989)
- Like a Prayer (Madonna): RIAA Platinum Award (1989)
- I'm Breathless: Music from and Inspired by the Film Dick Tracy (Madonna): RIAA Platinum Award (1990)
- Rush Street (Richard Marx): RIAA Platinum Award (1991)
- Janet (Janet Jackson): RIAA Platinum Award (1993)
- Paid Vacation (Richard Marx): RIAA Platinum Award (1994)
- HIStory: Past, Present and Future, Book I (Michael Jackson): RIAA Platinum Award (1995)
- Blood on the Dance Floor: HIStory in the Mix (Michael Jackson): RIAA Platinum Award (1997)
- YouTube Silver Creator Award (2018)
- YouTube Golden Creator Award (2026)

== Legacy ==
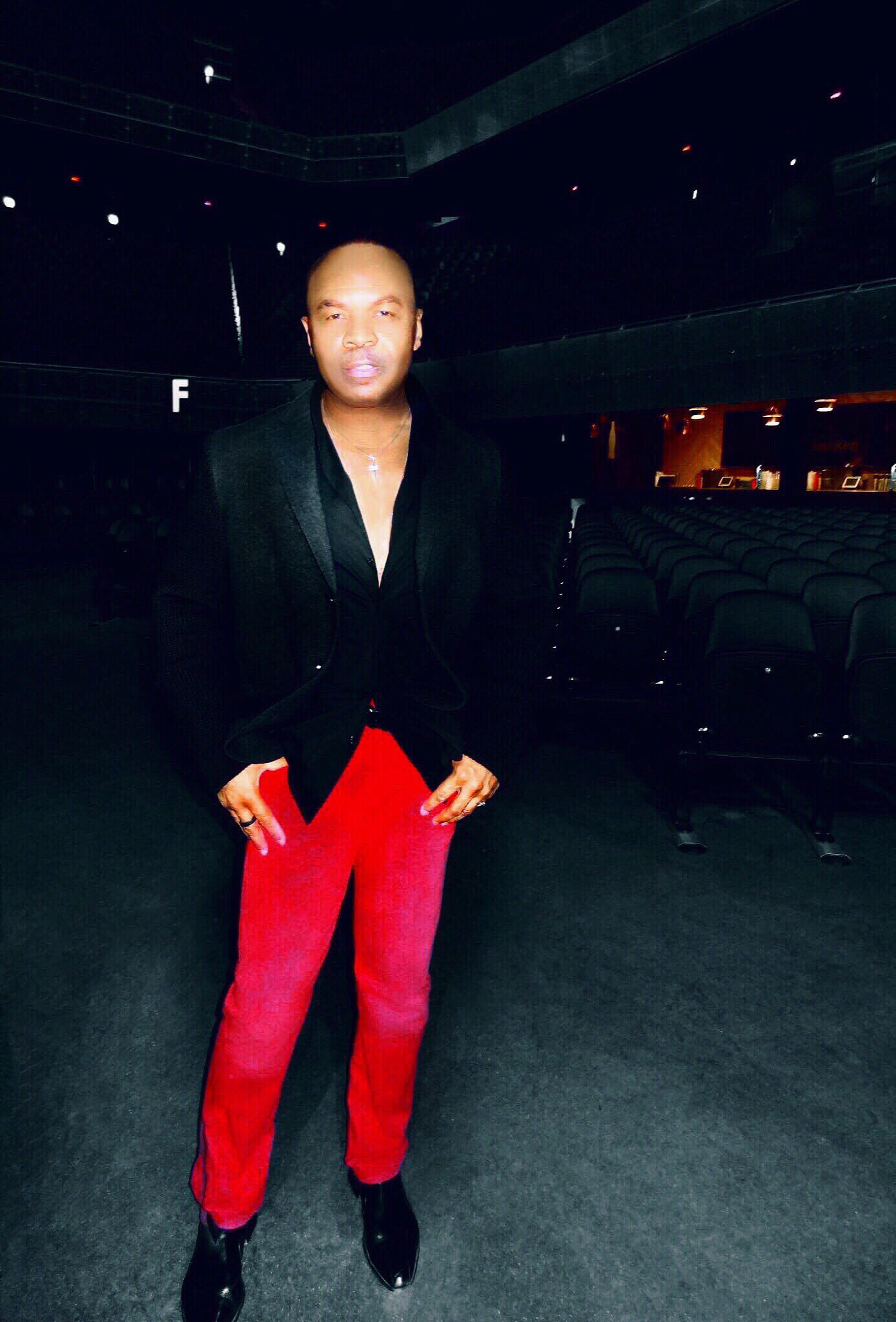
Moffett in Milan, Italy prior to a show

Moffett's drumming techniques and style are often mimicked by drummers all over the world to this day, and his work is taught in various music schools. His drum beat on "Don't Stop the Music" (1981) which he recorded with the Yarbrough and Peoples has been sampled by a multitude of modern artists (over 45 times) including on TLC's "Let's Do It Again" (1994), Nuttin' Nyce's "Froggy Style" (1995), P. Diddy's "Don't Stop What You're Doin'" (1997), on the soundtracks Soul Food and Playa, and by Eve, Alicia Keys, Keyshia Cole, Fat Pat, Beyoncé, Missy Elliott, Tichina Arnold and others. Rapper 2Pac sampled the song in 1996 on his unreleased original version of "Don't Stop", later remixed for his 2006 Pac's Life album.

== Filmography ==
Year	Film	Role	Credits
2017	Madonna 6 Concert DVD Set	Musician	Drummer
2016	Michael Jackson's Journey from Motown to Off the Wall	Himself	Speaker
2011	Madonna Live: The Virgin Tour (re-released also on Blu-ray)	Musician	Drummer
2009	Michael Jackson's This Is It	Musician	Drummer
2009	Madonna: Celebration – The Video Collection	Musician	Drummer
2003	Madonna Who's That Girl – Live in Japan (re-released)	Musician	Drummer
1997	Michael Jackson HIStory Tour – Live in Munich '97	Musician	Drummer
1991	Madonna: Truth or Dare	Musician	Drummer
1990	Madonna: The Immaculate Collection	Musician	Drummer
1988	Coming to America	Musician	Songwriter
1988	Madonna: Ciao, Italia! – Live from Italy	Musician	Drummer
1985	Madonna Live: The Virgin Tour (re-released also on Blu-ray)	Musician	Drummer

== Discography ==
=== Albums ===
Year	Album	Artist	Credits
2009	Christmas Again	Self	Songwriter, arranger, background vocals, drum overdubs, producer
2008	Original Album Classics	The Jackson 5	Main personnel
2004	The Essential Jacksons	The Jacksons	Drums
2003	Universo Fortis	Alberto Fortis	Musician
2002	Something Beautiful	Color Theory	Drums, percussion
2000	Come Play with Me	Amanda Shelby	Drums
2000	Sexy Sweet Thing	Cameo	Vocals (background)
2001	Victory/Triumph (Reissue)	The Jacksons	Drums
1999	Three for One Box Set	Madonna	Drums, percussion
1999	Rewind	Vasco Rossi	Drums
1998	Star Kid (Soundtrack)	Nicholas Pike	Drums
1997	Flesh and Bone	Richard Marx	Drums
1996	Don't Be Scared by These Hands	Fee Waybill	Drums
1996	Kissing Rain	Roch Voisine	Drums
1996	The Real Deal	Edgar Winter	Drums
1994	Paid Vacation	Richard Marx	Drums
1993	Pretty Vultures	Ten Inch Men	Drums
1993	Duets	Elton John	Drums
1993	Five Live	George Michael	Drums
1992	Nerve Net	Brian Eno	Drums
1992	The Complete Collection and Then Some...	Barry Manilow	Drums
1991	Rush Street	Richard Marx	Drums
1990	To Be Continued... (box set)	Elton John	Drums
1990	I'm Breathless	Madonna	Drums, percussion
1990	Blond Ambition World Tour Live	Madonna	Live drums
1990	The Immaculate Collection	Madonna	Drums, percussion
1989	Animotion (Room to Move)	Animotion	Drums
1989	Mr. Jordan	Julian Lennon	Drums
1989	2300 Jackson Street	The Jacksons	Drums
1989	Sleeping with the Past	Elton John	Drums
1989	Like a Prayer	Madonna	Drums, percussion
1989	The CBS Collection (5xCD)	The Jacksons	Drums
1989	The Jacksons LP	The Jacksons	Drums
1988	Hope for the Runaway	Kenny Loggins	Drums
1988	This Is Serious	Marilyn Martin	Drums
1988	La Cocina Caliente	Luis Conte	Drums
1988	Forever	Chapter 8	Drums
1988	Coming to America	Soundtrack	Songwriter, arranger, background vocals, drum overdubs, producer
1988	One More Story	Peter Cetera	Drums
1988	Us	Nick Kamen	Drums
1987	Who's That Girl Live in Japan	Madonna	Live drums
1987	Timothy B.	Timothy B. Schmit (Eagles)	Percussion, cymbals
1986	True Blue	Madonna	Drums, percussion
1984	Ciao Italia: Live in Italy	Madonna	Drums
1984	Dream Street	Janet Jackson	Drums
1984	Jermaine Jackson	Jermaine Jackson	Drums
1984	Victory	The Jacksons	Drums
1983	Standing on the One	Job Gibson	Drums
1982	Diana's Duets	Diana Ross	Drums
1982	Heartbeats	Yarbrough and Peoples	Drums
1982	Silk Electric	Diana Ross	Drums
1981	The Jacksons Live!	The Jacksons	Live drums
1980	The Two of Us	Yarbrough and Peoples	Drums

=== Songs ===
Year	Song	Artist	Credits
2018	"Thriller" (instrumental) for Netflix documentary Quincy	Quincy Jones	Drums
2009	"Flame"	Self	Songwriter, arranger, background vocals, drum overdubs, producer
2009	"In Our Country"	Self	Songwriter, arranger, background vocals, drum overdubs, producer
2009	"To Be Free"	Self	Songwriter, arranger, background vocals, drum overdubs, producer
2004	"Don't Stop 'Til You Get Enough" – live in 1981, from The Essential Jacksons	The Jacksons	Live drums
1999	"La Fine Del Millennio"	Vasco Rossi	Drums
1997	"Still a Thrill"	Sybil	Drums
1995	"Words Without Meaning"	3T	Drums
1992	"Fractal Zoom"	Brian Eno	Drums
1993	"Papa Was a Rollin' Stone"	George Michael	Drums
1993	"Don't Let the Sun Go Down on Me"	Elton John & George Michael	Live drums
1987	"Hold Me in Your Heart"	Timothy B. Schmit (Eagles)	Cymbals
1987	"A Better Day Is Coming"	Timothy B. Schmit (Eagles)	Percussion
1988	"All Dressed Up" for the film Coming to America	Chico DeBarge	Songwriter, arranger, background vocals, drum overdubs, producer
1982	"Muscles"	Diana Ross	Drums, percussion, written by Michael Jackson
1982	"Love Song"	La Toya Jackson	Written by Jonathan Moffett & Tito Jackson
1981	"Don't Stop the Music"	Yarbrough and Peoples	Drums
