= Guy Babylon =

American keyboardist and composer (1956–2009)

Background information
- Born: December 20, 1956; New Windsor, Maryland
- Died: September 2, 2009 (aged 52)
- Occupations: Keyboardist, composer
- Instrument: Keyboards
- Years active: 1988-2009

Guy Babylon (December 20, 1956 – September 2, 2009) was an American keyboardist/composer, most noted for his work with Elton John.

Babylon was born in New Windsor, Maryland. He attended Francis Scott Key High School before moving on to the University of South Florida on a swimming scholarship, where he earned a BFA in music composition in 1979. Upon graduation, he moved to Los Angeles, California. In 1988, he joined Elton John's studio and touring band, appearing on the album Sleeping with the Past. In 1990, he performed with the group Warpipes, a side project of fellow Elton John member Davey Johnstone. Guy performed and recorded with several artists such as Mike Pinera, Iron Butterfly, Blues Image, Luis Cardenas and Renegade.

Babylon also arranged many Elton John introductions, including those used in "Bennie and the Jets" and "Pinball Wizard". In 2001, Babylon won a Grammy Award for his contributions on the Elton John / Tim Rice musical Aida. Babylon also worked extensively on the Elton John / Bernie Taupin musical Lestat, (based on the Anne Rice novels). Until his death, he lived in Los Angeles with his wife and children, and was a member of Elton John's six-member touring and recording band. He died of a heart attack on September 2, 2009, after swimming in a pool.
