= Half Mast (Slight Return) =

Single by Empire of the Sun

from the album Walking on a Dream
- Released: 15 January 2010
- Recorded: 2001–2007: Soundworks Music Studio, Linear Recording (Sydney)
- Genre: Electronic rock; synthpop
- Length: 3:35
- Label: Virgin; EMI
- Songwriters: Nick Littlemore; Luke Steele; Jonathon Sloan; Peter Mayes
- Producers: Nick Littlemore; Luke Steele; Jonathon Sloan; Peter Mayes

Empire of the Sun singles chronology
"Without You" (2009)	"Half Mast (Slight Return)" (2010)	"Alive" (2013)

Music video
- "Half Mast (Slight Return)" on YouTube

"Half Mast (Slight Return)" is a song by Australian electronic music duo Empire of the Sun, released on 15 January 2010 as a digital download available through the iTunes Store in Australia only. The song was taken as the fifth single from their debut album Walking on a Dream. Virgin Records and EMI Music released it as a radio promotion single on 8 February 2010 and on iTunes on 16 April 2010.

It is a remixed version of album track "Half Mast".

The music video for "Half Mast (Slight Return)" was filmed in New York City, featuring Luke Steele and actress Teresa Palmer and was directed by Nash Edgerton. The music video was released on 19 March 2010 on the band's YouTube site.

The song was sampled by Pittsburgh-based rapper Mac Miller for his song "The Spins" on the mixtape K.I.D.S..

== Track listing ==
1. "Half Mast (Slight Return)" (radio edit) – 3:37
2. "Half Mast (Slight Return)" (instrumental) – 3:35

== Certifications ==
Region	Certification	Certified units/sales
Australia (ARIA)	Gold	35,000^{‡}
^{‡} Sales+streaming figures based on certification alone.
