= Two Vines =

Studio album by Empire of the Sun
- Released: 28 October 2016
- Recorded: October 2014 – July 2016
- Studios: Studio 161, Henson Studios, Woody Jackson Studios (Los Angeles); Island Sound (Hawaii)
- Length: 41:01
- Label: Virgin EMI
- Producers: Empire of the Sun; Peter Mayes; Donnie Sloan

Empire of the Sun chronology
Ice on the Dune (2013)	Two Vines (2016)	Ask That God (2024)

Singles from Two Vines
- 1. "High and Low" Released: 24 August 2016; 2. "To Her Door" Released: 30 September 2016; 3. "Way to Go" Released: 21 October 2016

Two Vines is the third studio album by Australian electronic music duo Empire of the Sun. It was released on 28 October 2016 by Virgin EMI Records. The album features guest appearances from Fleetwood Mac's Lindsey Buckingham, Wendy Melvoin, Henry Hey, and Tim Lefebvre. It was the duo's last album for 8 years until 2024's Ask That God.

== Background ==
The duo started writing their third studio album after contributing music to the 2014 film Dumb and Dumber To. The album was recorded in Hawaii and Los Angeles, and it was co-produced by Empire of the Sun and Peter Mayes alongside regular collaborator Jonathan Sloan. In November 2015, lead singer Luke Steele noted that the album was "75 percent there".

On 22 August 2016, it was announced that the album was titled Two Vines and would be released on 28 October. It features contributions from Fleetwood Mac singer-guitarist Lindsey Buckingham, Wendy Melvoin (from Prince's The Revolution band), and David Bowie collaborators Henry Hey and Tim Lefebvre. Nick Littlemore explained the inspiration behind the title as "this image of a modern city overtaken by jungle".

The album's lead single, "High and Low", was released on 24 August 2016. This was shortly followed by the album's first promotional single, "Two Vines", which was released the following day. "To Her Door" was released on 30 September 2016 as the album's second single.

== Critical reception ==
Professional ratings
Aggregate scores
Source	Rating
AnyDecentMusic?	6.4/10
Metacritic	66/100
Review scores
Source	Rating
AllMusic	4/5 stars

Two Vines received generally positive reviews from critics. At Metacritic, which assigns a normalised rating out of 100 to reviews from mainstream publications, the album received an average score of 66, based on 14 reviews.

== Track listing ==
Two Vines track listing
No.	Title	Writer(s)	Producer(s)	Length
1.	"Before"	Luke Steele; Nicholas Littlemore; Mayes; Henry Hey	Empire of the Sun; Peter Mayes	4:04
2.	"High and Low"	Steele; Littlemore; Mayes; Jonathan Sloan	Empire of the Sun; Mayes	3:44
3.	"Two Vines"	Steele; Littlemore; Sloan	Empire of the Sun; Donnie Sloan	3:49
4.	"Friends"	Steele; Littlemore; Mayes; Sloan	Empire of the Sun; Sloan; Mayes	3:20
5.	"There's No Need"	Steele; Littlemore; Mayes; Sloan	Empire of the Sun; Mayes; Sloan	3:28
6.	"Way to Go"	Steele; Littlemore; Tim Lefebvre; Hey	Empire of the Sun; Mayes	3:12
7.	"Ride"	Steele; Littlemore; Mayes; Hey; Wendy Melvoin	Empire of the Sun; Mayes	4:07
8.	"Digital Life"	Steele; Littlemore; Teddy Geiger; Mayes	Empire of the Sun; Mayes	4:02
9.	"First Crush"	Steele; Littlemore; Mayes; Hey; Sloan	Empire of the Sun; Mayes; Sloan	4:10
10.	"ZZZ"	Steele; Littlemore; Sloan	Empire of the Sun; Mayes	3:10
11.	"To Her Door"	Steele; Littlemore; Mayes; Sloan; Lindsey Buckingham	Empire of the Sun; Mayes	3:55
Total length:				41:01

Deluxe edition bonus tracks
No.	Title	Writer(s)	Producer(s)	Length
12.	"Keystone"	Steele; Littlemore; Mayes; Sloan; Joe Hundertmark	Empire of the Sun; Mayes; Sloan	2:31
13.	"Lend Me Some Light"	Steele; Littlemore; Mayes; Hey	Empire of the Sun; Mayes	3:29
14.	"Welcome to My Life"	Steele; Littlemore; Mayes	Empire of the Sun; Mayes	4:02
Total length:				51:03

North American deluxe edition bonus track
No.	Title	Writer(s)	Length
15.	"Walking on a Dream"	Steele; Littlemore; Sloan	3:12
Total length:			54:15

== Personnel ==
- Empire of the Sun – production
- Steve Bach – additional keyboards (track 10)
- Lindsey Buckingham – backing vocals, guitars (track 11)
- Evan Frasier – mbira (track 10)
- Teddy Geiger – additional vocals (track 8)
- Mark Goldenberg – acoustic guitar (tracks 2, 3, 6, 11)
- Michael Harris – engineering (tracks 6, 12), drum and percussion engineering (track 10)
- Henry Hey – keyboards (tracks 1, 6, 7, 9)
- Scott Horscroft – production assistance
- SK Kakraba – gyil (track 10)
- Mito Kasuya – vocals (track 9)
- Tim Lefebvre – bass (tracks 9, 10)
- Alan Mark Lightner – marimba, xylophone (track 10)
- Mike Marsh – mastering
- Peter Mayes – engineering, mixing, production
- Jake Najor – drums (tracks 6, 10, 11)
- Next Episode – artwork
- Roof Studio – artwork
- Todd Simon – percussion direction (track 10)
- Todd M. Simon – marimba, vibraphone (track 10)
- Donnie Sloan – production
- Dexter Story – slit drums (track 10)
- Te'Amir Yohannes Sweeney – slit drums (track 10)
- David Wilder – bass (track 7)

== Charts ==
=== Weekly charts ===
Weekly chart performance for Two Vines
Chart (2016)	Peak position
Australian Albums (ARIA)	7
Belgian Albums (Ultratop Flanders)	66
Belgian Albums (Ultratop Wallonia)	70
French Albums (SNEP)	168
Irish Albums (IRMA)	78
New Zealand Heatseekers Albums (RMNZ)	2
Scottish Albums (Official Charts)	41
Swiss Albums (Schweizer Hitparade)	42
UK Albums (Official Charts)	42
US Billboard 200	51
US Top Dance Albums (Billboard)	1
US Top Alternative Albums (Billboard)	8
US Top Rock Albums (Billboard)	11

=== Year-end charts ===
Year-end chart performance for Two Vines
Chart (2016)	Position
US Dance/Electronic Albums (Billboard)	25
