= Standing on the Shore =

2009 single by Empire of the Sun

Single by Empire of the Sun

from the album Walking on a Dream
- B-side: "The Art of Driving"
- Released: 12 June 2009
- Recorded: 2005–2007: Soundworks Music, Linear Recording (Sydney)
- Genre: Synth-pop; art pop
- Length: 4:25
- Label: EMI
- Songwriters: Nick Littlemore; Luke Steele; Peter Mayes
- Producers: Nick Littlemore; Luke Steele; Peter Mayes

Empire of the Sun singles chronology
"We Are the People" (2008)	"Standing on the Shore" (2009)	"Without You" (2009)

Audio sample
- "Standing on the Shore": file; help

Music video
- "Standing on the Shore" on YouTube

"Standing on the Shore" is a song by Australian electronic music duo Empire of the Sun and the third single from their debut album Walking on a Dream. The single was released in June 2009, along with a cover of the Black Box Recorder song "The Art of Driving" as a B-side and features Steele's wife Jodi Steele on vocals. The B-side was originally recorded as the music for the advertisement of the new BMW Z4.

The song received extensive airplay on the Nova radio network in 2009. The song was featured in episode 4 of season 6 of HBO's Entourage on 2 August 2009, during the closing credits.

== Music video ==
Luke Steele posing with the swordfish girls and the triangular people whilst blowing some sand across in the music video for "Standing on the Shore".

The music video for "Standing on the Shore" was shot at Lancelin, north of Perth, Australia. The video clip was directed by Josh Logue of Mathematics and choreographed by Serena Chalker and Quindell Orton of Perth dance company Anything Is Valid Dance Theatre (AIVDT). The video is also the first to only feature Steele and not Littlemore. The video first aired on 17 June 2009.

== Track listings ==
UK 7-inch limited-edition vinyl single

- Blue-colored see-through vinyl
1. "Standing on the Shore" – 4:22
2. "The Art of Driving" – 4:32

iTunes digital download

1. "Standing on the Shore" – 4:22
2. "The Art of Driving" – 4:32

== Charts ==
Chart (2009)	Peak position
Belgium (Ultratip Bubbling Under Flanders)	13

== Release history ==
Region	Date	Label	Format
Australia	12 June 2009	EMI	Digital download
Australia	23 June 2009	EMI	CD
