= AEIOU (Pnau and Empire of the Sun song) =

Single by Pnau and Empire of the Sun

from the album Hyperbolic and Ask That God
- Released: 13 October 2023
- Genre: EDM; dance
- Length: 3:15
- Label: Etcetc; Columbia
- Songwriters: Luke Steele; Nick Littlemore; Sam Littlemore; Peter Mayes; Pablo Bowman; Richard Boardman
- Producer: Pnau

Pnau singles chronology
"Stars" (2023)	"AEIOU" (2023)	"All Your Energy" (2024)

Empire of the Sun singles chronology
"The Thrill" (2020)	"AEIOU" (2023)	"Changes" (2024)

Music video
- "AEIOU" on YouTube

"AEIOU" is a song by Australian electronic music projets Pnau and Empire of the Sun. It was released on 13 October 2023 through Etcetc music and later reissued through Columbia Records as the fourth single from Pnau's sixth studio album, album Hyperbolic (2024). The song is also featured on Empire of the Sun's 2024 album, Ask That God.

At the APRA Music Awards of 2025, "AEIOU" was nominated for Most Performed Dance/Electronic Work.

== Background ==
Pnau and Empire of the Sun are electronic music projets connected with the songwriter and producer Nick Littlemore, being in both acts. Pnau includes Peter Mayes and Sam Littlemore, while Empire of the Sun is completed with Luke Steele. The collaboration was teased via social media posts on 5 October 2023, with the statement "PNAU + Empire of The Sun - pre teaser". A 15-second snippet was released on 6 October.

About the collaboration, Nick Littlemore said, "This is a dream record for us. We've had the idea of a vowels-based song way back before we met Elton, but it never came together until now. It turns out it was worth the wait. And in great style we finally present a collaboration with Empire of the Sun! A voice like no other, let it lead you to the dancefloor."

Luke Steele said "This song is about not letting the garden of Eden within us all be corrupted by the world."

== Critical reception ==
Mary Varvaris from The Music said "Featuring Luke Steele's unmistakable vocal alongside Pnau's catchy beats, 'AEIOU' is a dance single we're not getting out of our heads anytime soon".

== Music video ==
The music video directed by Kuba Matyka and Kamila Staszczyszyn was released on October 12, 2023.

== Track listings ==
Digital download/streaming

1. "AEIOU" – 3:15

Digital download/streaming (The Remixes)

1. "AEIOU" – 3:15
2. "AEIOU" (TCTS remix) – 3:55
3. "AEIOU" (Pegassi remix) - 3:55
4. "AEIOU" (Catz remix) – 3:13

== Charts ==
=== Weekly charts ===
Weekly chart performance for "AEIOU"
Chart (2023–2024)	Peak position
Latvia Airplay (LAIPA)	6
Russia Airplay (TopHit)	15
San Marino (SMRRTV Top 50)	25
Slovakia Airplay (ČNS IFPI)	56

=== Monthly charts ===
Monthly chart performance for "AEIOU"
Chart (2024)	Peak position
Russia Airplay (TopHit)	30

=== Year-end charts ===
Year-end chart performance for "AEIOU"
Chart (2024)	Position
Belarus Airplay (TopHit)	95
Russia Airplay (TopHit)	162
