= High and Low (Empire of the Sun song) =

Single by Empire of the Sun

from the album Two Vines
- Released: 24 August 2016
- Genre: Dance-pop; electropop
- Length: 3:45
- Label: Capitol
- Songwriters: Luke Steele; Nick Littlemore; Peter Mayes; Donnie Sloan
- Producers: Empire of the Sun; Peter Mayes; Donnie Sloan

Empire of the Sun singles chronology
"Celebrate" (2014)	"High and Low" (2016)	"To Her Door" (2016)

Music video
- "High and Low" on YouTube

"High and Low" is a song by Australian electronic duo Empire of the Sun. It was released in 24 August 2016 as the lead single from their third studio album, Two Vines.

Group member Nick Littlemore gave details of the track during its premiere on American radio station KROQ, saying: "It was about this girl I knew when I was a kid, named Alice D, who was a bit of a wild child. She did all sorts of crazy things. We wanted to write a song that captured the innocence and bravery of youth...being a teenager, having the experience of throwing caution to the wind and trying wild things for the first time." (Some fans have interpreted "Alice D" as a play on LSD, but the group members insisted that this is not the case.)

The song features on a Holden commercial airing during the eighth season of The X Factor Australia and features host Jason Dundas. This song was also featured in EA Sports game, FIFA 17, and the Danish series The Rain. The song is also featured in TV commercials for San Pellegrino sparkling water.

Additional remixes were released in October 2016.

== Critical reception ==
Ryan Reed from Rolling Stone described the song as "pulsating", adding; "Acoustic guitar chords give way to booming synth-pads on the chorus, as singer Luke Steele sings wistfully: 'If I had my way/ Never let you go.'"

Collin Robinson from Stereogum described the song as "a slow-building slice of euphoria with big drums, grand synths, and swishing ambient sweeps."

Lars Brandle of Billboard described the song as "a straight-up party tune which flows with melodies, synths and good times."

== Track listings ==
Digital download
No.	Title	Length
1.	"High and Low"	3:45

Digital download
No.	Title	Length
1.	"High and Low" (Hayden James remix)	4:38

Digital download
No.	Title	Length
1.	"High and Low" (Tommy Trash remix)	4:17

== Charts ==
=== Weekly charts ===
Chart (2016)	Peak position
Australia (ARIA)	66
US Alternative Airplay (Billboard)	11
US Dance Club Songs (Billboard)	9
US Hot Dance/Electronic Songs (Billboard)	16

=== Year-end charts ===
Chart (2016)	Position
US Hot Dance/Electronic Songs (Billboard)	77
Chart (2017)	Position
US Hot Dance/Electronic Songs (Billboard)	79

== Certifications ==
Region	Certification	Certified units/sales
Australia (ARIA)	2× Platinum	140,000^{‡}
Canada (Music Canada)	Gold	40,000^{‡}
New Zealand (RMNZ)	Gold	15,000^{‡}
^{‡} Sales+streaming figures based on certification alone.
