= Ask That God =

Studio album by Empire of the Sun
- Released: 26 July 2024
- Recorded: April 2017 - June 2024
- Length: 43:24
- Labels: EMI Australia; Capitol
- Producers: Empire of the Sun; Peter Mayes

Empire of the Sun studio album chronology
Two Vines (2016)	Ask That God (2024)

Singles from Ask That God
- 1. "Changes" Released: 4 April 2024; 2. "Music on the Radio" Released: 17 May 2024; 3. "Cherry Blossom" Released: 21 June 2024; 4. "The Feeling You Get" Released: 26 July 2024

Singles from Ask That God (Deluxe)
- 1. "Somebody's Son" Released: 24 January 2025

Ask That God is the fourth studio album by Australian electronic music duo Empire of the Sun, released on 26 July 2024 through EMI Music Australia and Capitol Records. The album was preceded by the singles "Changes", "Music on the Radio", and "Cherry Blossom", and also includes their 2023 collaboration with Nick Littlemore's project Pnau, "AEIOU".

At the 2024 ARIA Music Awards, Luke Steele, Nick Littlemore and Peter Mayes were nominated for Best Engineered Release and Best Produced Release.

A deluxe edition of the album was released on 24 January 2025; it features two new tracks.

== Background ==
The group began working on their fourth album between late 2016 and early 2017 after releasing Two Vines, before announcing a hiatus. In April 2024, they began recording the album, which included recordings they had kept for the past seven years. Littlemore stated that the duo was "blessed with" the album and that it "represents the greatest shift in consciousness our world has ever seen and that's reflected in the music". The album, the group's fourth, was released on 26 July 2024. Luke Steele likened the second single "Music on the Radio" to "a teenager rebelling against his imaginary emotions". Littlemore said "There might have been as many as 1,200 songs that we wrote in that time to get to the 12 we have here."

== Critical reception ==
Professional ratings
Aggregate scores
Source	Rating
Metacritic	82/100
Review scores
Source	Rating
AllMusic	4/5 stars
Clash	7/10
MusicOMH	4/5 stars
The Observer	4/5 stars
Record Collector	4/5 stars

Ask That God received a score of 82 out of 100 on review aggregator Metacritic based on five critics' reviews, which the website categorised as "universal acclaim". Record Collector stated that "while their familiar stargazing disco again dominates, the songwriting is at its sharpest as fresh influences add bite". Neil Z. Yeung of AllMusic wrote that it "feels like both a return to form and a retrospective journey through their sonic evolution" and a "return to the blissful, body-moving spirit of Empire of the Sun's first two classics".

Damien Morris of The Observer said that "like their three previous projects, this one contains at least two elite tunes ('Changes', 'Cherry Blossom') interspersed with effervescent yet evanescent second-tier tracks ('Revolve', 'Music on the Radio', 'Ask That God') and smoothly produced non-bangers (everything else)". Ben Hogwood of MusicOMH remarked that Littlemore and Steele "find their familiar chemistry in providing escapism in sun kissed pop to sing and dance to". Lily Blakeney-Edwards of Clash called it "a journey in every sense providing enough density and style changes to keep listeners intrigued to the very end".

== Track listing ==
Ask That God track listing
No.	Title	Writer(s)	Producer(s)	Length
1.	"Changes"	Luke Steele; Nick Littlemore; Magnus Lidehäll; Salem Al Fakir; Vincent Pontare; Pontus Winnberg	Empire of the Sun; Lidehäll; Peter Mayes; Vargas & Lagola; Winnberg	3:38
2.	"Cherry Blossom"	Steele; N. Littlemore; Al Fakir; Pontare; Caroline Cederlöf; Max Grahn	Empire of the Sun; Fat Max Gsus; Vargas & Lagola; Mayes^{[a]}	3:27
3.	"Music on the Radio"	Steele; N. Littlemore; Roman Campolo; Mayes; Sam Littlemore; Paul Phamous; Ali Tamposi	Empire of the Sun; Mayes	2:56
4.	"The Feeling You Get"	Steele; N. Littlemore; Carl Nordström	Empire of the Sun; Nordström; Mayes^{[a]}	4:16
5.	"AEIOU" (with Pnau)	Steele; N. Littlemore; Richard Boardman; Pablo Bowman; S. Littlemore; Mayes	Pnau	3:14
6.	"Television"	Steele; N. Littlemore; Al Fakir; Pierre Leroux; Pontare	Empire of the Sun; Mayes; Vargas & Lagola	3:14
7.	"Happy Like You"	Steele; N. Littlemore; Henry Hey; Mayes; Connor McDonough; Riley McDonough	Empire of the Sun; Mayes	2:59
8.	"Revolve"	Steele; N. Littlemore; Hey; Mayes; Tim Lefebvre	Empire of the Sun; Mayes	3:14
9.	"Wild World"	Steele; N. Littlemore	Empire of the Sun	3:46
10.	"Ask That God"	Steele; N. Littlemore	Empire of the Sun; Mayes	3:02
11.	"Rhapsodize"	Steele; N. Littlemore	Empire of the Sun	6:17
12.	"Friends I Know"	Steele; N. Littlemore	Empire of the Sun	3:21
Total length:				43:24

Ask That God (Deluxe) track listing
No.	Title	Producer(s)	Length
13.	"Dark Secret"		3:29
14.	"Somebody's Son" (featuring Lindsey Buckingham)	Empire of the Sun	3:25

Note

- ^{^[a]} signifies an additional producer

== Personnel ==
Empire of the Sun

- Nick Littlemore – synthesizer (tracks 3, 6–8, 10–12), programming (6), background vocals (9)
- Luke Steele – vocals (all tracks); drum programming, guitar (tracks 1, 2, 4, 9)

Additional contributors

- Mike Marsh – mastering
- Alex Ghenea – mixing (tracks 1–4, 6–12)
- Peter Mayes – mixing (tracks 3, 5)
- Magnus Lidehäll – drum programming, synthesizer (tracks 1, 2, 4, 9)
- André Sogliuzzo – voiceover narration (track 11)
- Cruz Steele – speaking voice (track 12)
- Pontus Winnberg – drum programming, synthesizer (tracks 1, 2, 4, 9)
- Vargas & Lagola – guitar, synthesizer (tracks 1, 2, 4, 9)

== Charts ==
=== Weekly charts ===
Weekly chart performance for Ask That God
Chart (2024)	Peak position
Australian Albums (ARIA)	10
Belgian Albums (Ultratop Flanders)	113
Belgian Albums (Ultratop Wallonia)	90
German Albums (Offizielle Top 100)	58
Scottish Albums (Official Charts)	19
Swiss Albums (Schweizer Hitparade)	17
US Top Album Sales (Billboard)	26
US Top Dance Albums (Billboard)	4

=== Year-end charts ===
Year-end chart performance for Ask That God
Chart (2024)	Position
Australian Dance Albums (ARIA)	31
Chart (2025)	Position
Australian Dance Albums (ARIA)	40
