= The Thrill =

Single by Wiz Khalifa and Empire of the Sun

from the album Burn After Rolling
- Released: November 12, 2020
- Recorded: 2009
- Length: 3:54
- Label: Rostrum
- Songwriters: Luke Steele; Nick Littlemore; Jonathan Sloan

Wiz Khalifa singles chronology
"Slim Peter" (2020)	"The Thrill" (2020)	"Cheers" (2020)

Empire of the Sun singles chronology
"Chrysalis" (2019)	"The Thrill" (2020)	"AEIOU" (2023)

"The Thrill" is a song by American rapper Wiz Khalifa and Australian electronic music duo Empire of the Sun. The song uses a prominent sample of Empire of the Sun's 2008 single "Walking on a Dream". In 2009, Wiz Khalifa recorded "The Thrill" for his 2009 mixtape Burn After Rolling, using the then illegal sample. The song was officially released on November 12, 2020.

Wiz Khalifa said of the release "'The Thrill' is a really special song to me because I seen [sic.] that one grow from the ground up. I remember being at a low key show at a college and one of the kids told me about the song and he said 'man you'll be that dude if you sample the song' So I immediately went home, started thinking of some bars, went to the studio and recorded it and it was one of those songs that we took on the road and made our own videos for, and performed it, and the world loved it and I'm happy that it's available on all streaming platforms and that people can enjoy it the way that they need to now."

Empire of the Sun said "As this track was breaking for us around the globe we kept hearing undercurrents of Wiz's version. 'Walking on a Dream' is a song that morphs and transcends so many emotions and musical plains that it's great to hear it alive in another world, Wiz's world."

== Reception ==
Hot New Hip Hop said "Khalifa's 'The Thrill' takes a cut from indie electro act Empire of the Sun and turns it into an effective party rap jam".

XXL Magazine called it "One of Wiz Khalifa's 20 Best Songs."

Peter Sobat from Blurred Culture said "In these strange times Wiz Khalifa's 'The Thrill' takes us back to less stressful points in our lives and reminds us to lighten up and have some fun."

== Charts ==
Chart performance for "The Thrill"
Chart (2020)	Peak position
New Zealand Hot Singles (RMNZ)	35

== Certifications ==
Certifications for "The Thrill"
Region	Certification	Certified units/sales
Denmark (IFPI Danmark)	Gold	45,000^{‡}
France (SNEP)	Gold	100,000^{‡}
Italy (FIMI)	Gold	100,000^{‡}
New Zealand (RMNZ)	3× Platinum	90,000^{‡}
United Kingdom (BPI)	Gold	400,000^{‡}
United States (RIAA)	Platinum	1,000,000^{‡}
^{‡} Sales+streaming figures based on certification alone.
