= Without You (Empire of the Sun song) =

Single by Empire of the Sun

from the album Walking on a Dream
- Released: 25 September 2009
- Recorded: 2000–2007
- Studio: Soundworks Music Studio, Linear Recording (Sydney)
- Genre: Electronic rock; synthpop
- Length: 5:00 (album version); 3:31 (new version)
- Label: EMI
- Songwriters: Nick Littlemore; Luke Steele; Jonathon Sloan

Empire of the Sun singles chronology
"Standing on the Shore" (2009)	"Without You" (2009)	"Half Mast (Slight Return)" (2010)

Music video
- "Without You" on YouTube

"Without You" is a song by Australian electronic music duo Empire of the Sun, released as the fourth single from their debut album Walking on a Dream. The single was digitally released on the Australian iTunes Store on 25 September 2009. The CD single was released on 28 September 2009. The song was remixed for single release, making it more uptempo and upbeat.

== Lyrics and writing ==
"Without You" is a notable song on Walking on a Dream as it is the only down-tempo composition on the entire album, contrasting with the previous single releases from the band. The song is a slow, melancholy ballad sung by Steele with such lyrics as; "No future there is no past, No slow there is no fast."

== Music video ==
Luke Steele posing in the neon dome in the music video for "Without You".

The music video was shot in Fox Studios in Sydney by Josh Logue.

The music video, which does not feature Littlemore, consists of Steele in black and white birdlike garb and ice-blue contact lens, who is surrounded by a geodesic dome made of white neon lights. To complete the ice blue theme, other props include a chair and table of food all within the video's aesthetic. The video was shown on the Australian MTV website, YouTube, NovaNation.com and in a link on Twitter.

NovaNation claims "The Empire of the Sun boys have dropped another video that speaks volumes about their ability to see beyond the music." The video has also been aired on Ten's Video Hits, GO!'s Eclipse Music TV and ABCs Rage.

== Track listing ==
iTunes EP

1. "Without You" (new version) – 3:31
2. "Walking on a Dream" (Treasure Fingers Remix) – 5:25
3. "Standing on the Shore" (Losers Remix) – 6:39
4. "Without You" (album version) – 4:58

UK 7-inch vinyl single

- Purple-colored see-through vinyl
1. "Without You" (new version) – 3:31
2. "Girl" – 3:12

Promo CD single

1. "Without You" (new version) – 3:31
2. "Without You" (new version) (instrumental) – 3:33

== Release history ==
Region	Date	Label	Format
Australia	25 September 2009	EMI	Digital download
Australia	28 September 2009	EMI	CD
