= We Are the People (Empire of the Sun song) =

2008 single by Empire of the Sun

Single by Empire of the Sun

from the album Walking on a Dream
- Released: 20 September 2008
- Studio: Soundworks Music, Linear Recording (Sydney, Australia)
- Length: 4:27 (album version); 4:02 (radio edit)
- Label: Capitol
- Songwriters: Luke Steele; Nick Littlemore; Jonathan Sloan
- Producers: Empire of the Sun; Donnie Sloan; Peter Mayes

Empire of the Sun singles chronology
"Walking on a Dream" (2008)	"We Are the People" (2008)	"Standing on the Shore" (2009)

Alternative cover
- Australian iTunes single cover

Audio sample
- "We Are the People": file; help

Music video
- "We Are the People" on YouTube

"We Are the People" is a song by Australian electronic music duo Empire of the Sun, released as the second single from their debut studio album, Walking on a Dream (2008). It was released in Australia on 20 September 2008 and debuted at number 85 on the ARIA Singles Chart before peaking at number 24 on 12 January 2009. It was also a European hit, peaking at number one in Germany in December 2010.

== Music video ==
The music video for the song, directed by Josh Logue, was inspired by the Mexican festival Day of the Dead (Día de Muertos). It was shot in Mexico, with locations including the Las Pozas surrealist sculpture gardens at Xilitla in San Luis Potosí, as well as Monterrey and García in Nuevo León.

The video was nominated for Best Video at the ARIA Music Awards of 2009.

== Track listings ==
Australian CD

1. "We Are the People" – 4:34
2. "We Are the People" (Shazam remix) – 5:44
3. "We Are the People" (Sam La More remix)" – 7:32
4. "Walking on a Dream" (Neon Neon mix) – 3:50
5. "Walking on a Dream" (Danger racing remix) – 4:37

UK iTunes EP 1

1. "We Are the People" – 4:32
2. "We Are the People" (Burns remix) – 6:52
3. "We Are the People" (The Golden Filter remix – UK edit) – 6:57
4. "We Are the People" (We Are the Cagedbaby mix – UK edit) – 6:56
5. "We Are the People" (Crazy P remix – UK edit) – 6:49

UK iTunes EP 2

1. "We Are the People" – 4:32
2. "We Are the People" (Wawa remix; UK edit) – 6:55
3. "We Are the People" (The Shapeshifters vocal remix; UK edit) – 6:47
4. "We Are the People" (Sam La More remix; UK edit) – 6:47
5. "We Are the People" (Shazam remix) – 5:44
6. "We Are the People" (Style of Eye remix; UK edit) – 6:58

== Charts ==
=== Weekly charts ===
Chart (2009–2012)	Peak position
Australia (ARIA)	24
Austria (Ö3 Austria Top 40)	2
Belgium (Ultratop 50 Flanders)	20
Belgium (Ultratop 50 Wallonia)	16
CIS Airplay (TopHit)	118
Czech Republic Airplay (ČNS IFPI)	57
Denmark (Tracklisten)	33
Europe (European Hot 100 Singles)	15
Finland (Suomen virallinen lista)	20
Germany (GfK)	1
Greece Digital Song Sales (Billboard)	3
Ireland (IRMA)	23
Israel International Airplay (Media Forest)	5
Italy (FIMI)	19
Luxembourg Digital Song Sales (Billboard)	1
Mexico Ingles Airplay (Billboard)	46
Norway (VG-lista)	12
Russia Airplay (TopHit)	108
Scottish Singles Sales (Official Charts)	49
Slovakia Airplay (ČNS IFPI)	51
Sweden (Sverigetopplistan)	40
Switzerland (Schweizer Hitparade)	20
Ukraine Airplay (TopHit)	101
UK Singles (Official Charts)	14

Chart (2024–2026)	Peak position
Austria (Ö3 Austria Top 40)	48
Canada Hot 100 (Billboard)	74
Czech Republic Singles Digital (ČNS IFPI)	96
France (SNEP)	167
Global 200 (Billboard)	83
Greece International (IFPI)	13
Latvia Streaming (LaIPA)	3
Lithuania (AGATA)	9
Netherlands (Single Tip)	14
Norway (VG-lista)	53
Poland Streaming (OLiS)	97
Portugal (AFP)	135
Romania Airplay (TopHit)	91
Slovakia Singles Digital (ČNS IFPI)	51
Sweden (Sverigetopplistan)	91
Switzerland (Schweizer Hitparade)	42
Ukraine Airplay (TopHit)	172
US Bubbling Under Hot 100 (Billboard)	3
US Hot Rock & Alternative Songs (Billboard)	16

=== Monthly charts ===
Monthly chart performance
Chart (2026)	Peak position
Romania Airplay (TopHit)	99

=== Year-end charts ===
Chart (2009)	Position
Australia (ARIA)	98
Belgium (Ultratop 50 Flanders)	78
Belgium (Ultratop 50 Wallonia)	80
Italy (FIMI)	90
Switzerland (Schweizer Hitparade)	99
UK Singles (OCC)	119

Chart (2010)	Position
Germany (Media Control GfK)	16

Chart (2011)	Position
Austria (Ö3 Austria Top 40)	23
Germany (Media Control GfK)	33

Chart (2025)	Position
Belgium (Ultratop 50 Flanders)	179
Switzerland (Schweizer Hitparade)	75
US Hot Rock & Alternative Songs (Billboard)	31

== Certifications ==
Certifications for "We Are the People"
Region	Certification	Certified units/sales
Australia (ARIA)	7× Platinum	490,000^{‡}
Austria (IFPI Austria)	Gold	15,000^{*}
Austria (IFPI Austria) Southstar remix	Gold	15,000^{‡}
Brazil (Pro-Música Brasil)	Gold	30,000^{‡}
Canada (Music Canada)	Platinum	80,000^{‡}
Denmark (IFPI Danmark)	Platinum	90,000^{‡}
Germany (BVMI)	3× Gold	450,000^{‡}
Hungary (MAHASZ) Southstar remix	Platinum	4,000^{‡}
Italy (FIMI)	Gold	50,000^{‡}
New Zealand (RMNZ)	4× Platinum	120,000^{‡}
Poland (ZPAV) Southstar remix	Gold	25,000^{‡}
Portugal (AFP)	Platinum	10,000^{‡}
Spain (Promusicae)	Gold	30,000^{‡}
Switzerland (IFPI Switzerland)	Gold	15,000^{^}
United Kingdom (BPI)	2× Platinum	1,200,000^{‡}
Streaming
Greece (IFPI Greece)	2× Platinum	4,000,000^{†}
^{*} Sales figures based on certification alone.^{^} Shipments figures based on certification alone.^{‡} Sales+streaming figures based on certification alone.^{†} Streaming-only figures based on certification alone.

== Release history ==
Country	Date	Label	Format
Australia	20 September 2008	Capitol; EMI	Digital single
Australia	20 February 2009	Capitol; EMI	Digital EP
Australia	20 February 2009	Capitol; EMI	CD single
Australia	1 May 2009	Capitol; EMI	Digital remix EP
Germany	8 May 2009	EMI	Digital EP
United Kingdom	24 May 2009	Virgin	Digital EP
United Kingdom	31 May 2009	Virgin	Digital EP
United Kingdom	1 June 2009	Virgin	7" single
Germany	26 November 2010	EMI	CD single

== Usage in media ==
The song has been used in media productions such as advertisements for the Special Broadcasting Service, Vizio televisions, and Idents for Channel V. From October 2010, the song was used in Vodafone TV commercials in Germany, upon which it reentered the charts and reached number 1. The song was also used in the 2011 films The Roommate and Hall Pass, as well as in episode 11 of season 6 of Entourage.
