= Walking on a Dream =

Walking on a Dream may refer to:

- Walking on a Dream (album), a 2008 album by Empire of the Sun
  - "Walking on a Dream" (song), the album's title track
