= Malcolm Clark (musician) =

Australian musician

- Genres: Hard rock, blues, death metal, alternative rock, heavy metal, black metal, jazz, garage rock, psychedelic rock
- Occupations: Musician, Drummer, Guitarist, Pianist

Malcolm Clark is an Australian musician who has collaborated with many bands including The Sleepy Jackson, Jeff Martin 777, Steve Poltz, Bob Evans, The Basement Birds, Laney Lane, Katy Steele, Angry Anderson, The Exploders, Georgi Kay, Mess Hall, Eskimo Joe, Nathan Gaunt, Spencer Tracy, The Weapon is Sound, Divinyls

Malcolm Clark was born in 1977. His Father Vic Clark, originally from England, played guitar in the early 1960s in London with well-known artists, like Johnny Kidd & The Pirates and Screaming Lord Sutch and the Savages. Malcolm become a member of up and coming Perth band The Sleepy Jackson in 2001. The band signed to EMI MUSIC and they toured worldwide until 2007 when they decided to take a break. Lead singer Luke Steele went on to create Empire of the Sun with Nic Littlemore.
