= Kamerunga =

Kamerunga may refer to:

- Kamerunga, Queensland
- Kamerunga (band)
