= Walking on a Dream (song) =

Single by Empire of the Sun

from the album Walking on a Dream
- Released: 30 August 2008
- Recorded: August 2007
- Genre: Electropop; synth-pop
- Length: 3:16
- Label: Capitol
- Songwriters: Luke Steele; Nick Littlemore; Donnie Sloan
- Producers: Empire of the Sun; Donnie Sloan; Peter Mayes

Empire of the Sun singles chronology
"Walking on a Dream" (2008)	"We Are the People" (2008)

Music video
- "Walking on a Dream" on YouTube

Audio sample
- "Walking on a Dream": file; help

"Walking on a Dream" is a song by Australian electronic music duo Empire of the Sun, released on 30 August 2008 as the lead single from their debut studio album of the same name (2008). The track was co-written by band members Luke Steele and Nick Littlemore with Jonathan "Donnie" Sloan. The full Sam La More remix was made available as a free download on the band's official website.

On the Australian ARIA Charts, it reached number ten, and was certified double platinum to indicate shipment of over 140,000 units. It was listed at number four in the 2008 Triple J Hottest 100 popularity poll. "Walking on a Dream" won the category for Single of the Year at the ARIA Music Awards of 2009, and, in the following year, it won Dance Work of the Year at the APRA Awards. Although the single was originally due for release in the United Kingdom on 9 February 2009, the date was postponed until 6 July. In Europe, it reached number eight in both Belgium and Ireland; and peaked in the top 100 on the UK Singles Chart. The song was made the Single of the Week on the iTunes Store for the week of 21 April 2009. The song was featured in the 2011 movie Hall Pass. The song was also featured in the 2012 racing video game Forza Horizon and later in the 2016 Honda Civic "The Dreamer" commercial, which helped revive the song in the charts. with the song debuting on the US Billboard Hot 100 after more than seven years of release, peaking at number 65. In 2025, the song placed 24 in the Triple J Hottest 100 of Australian Songs. The song was sampled a year after its release on The Thrill by Wiz Khalifa.

== Background ==
Luke Steele (of The Sleepy Jackson) and Nick Littlemore (of Pnau) formed Empire of the Sun as an electronic duo in 2007. Their debut release, "Walking on a Dream", appeared as a single on 30 August 2008 ahead of the album of the same name on 3 October. The song was written as a prayer dedicated to one of Littlemore's ex-girlfriends who had become sick during an expedition in the Amazon rainforest. Steele wrote the lyrics while living in a caravan near his parents' house. Steele had assisted on tracks, "With You Forever" and "Freedom", for Pnau's self-titled album, which was issued in December 2007. As Empire of the Sun, the duo recorded material for Walking on a Dream, including the title track, at Soundworks Music Studio and Linear Recording in Sydney during various sessions throughout the latter part of that year. The track was co-written by Littlemore and Steele with Jonathan Sloan. Sloan also co-produced the album with the duo and Littlemore's bandmate, Peter Mayes of Pnau.

Sam Littlemore (Nick's older brother) aka Sam La More remixed the track, which was made available as a free download on the album's official website until December 2008.

== Composition ==
The song is composed in the key of F minor, with a tempo of 127 bpm.

== Music video ==
Nick Littlemore raises a sphere to create a blue beam in the video for "Walking on a Dream".

The music video for the song was shot by Josh Logue on location along the Bund in Shanghai, China, in July–August 2008, just before the 2008 Summer Olympics in Beijing. It features Steele and Littlemore wearing Eastern costumes and makeup, inspired by Peking Opera.

== Commercial performance ==
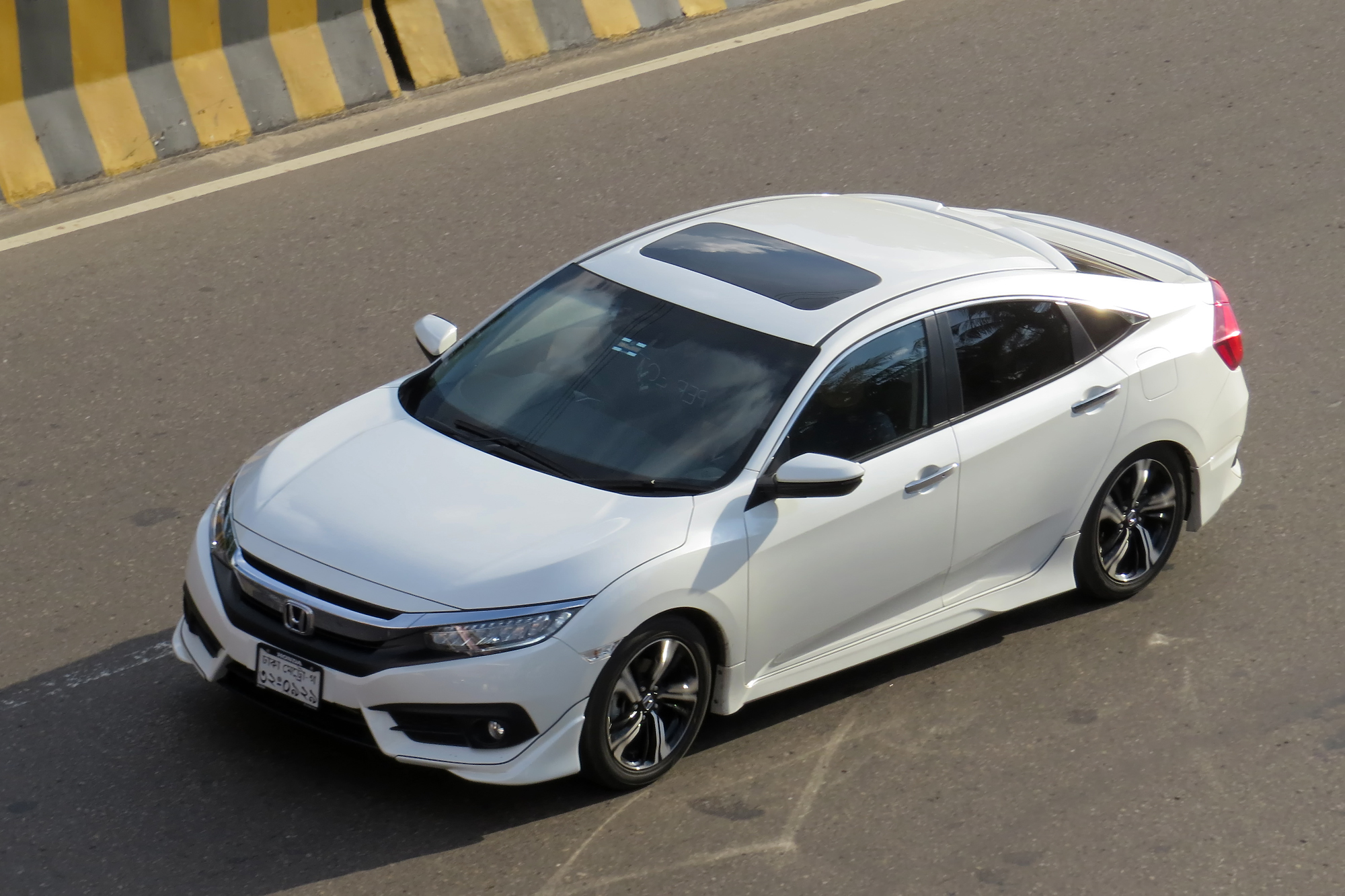
"Walking on a Dream" was featured in a 2016 Honda Civic commercial

The song was in a Honda Civic commercial in the U.S. in 2016, more than seven years after its original release. This led the song to finally chart in the country, making it their first Alternative Songs hit there. On May 14, 2016, the re-released single reached number one on Billboard's Dance Club Songs chart, seven years after having peaked at number 18 in its first chart run.

From March 2026, a remix of the song by DJ Jazzy Jones5 is used in a commercial by the retailer Tesco.

== Track listings ==
CD single and iTunes EP
No.	Title	Length
1.	"Walking on a Dream"	3:16
2.	"Walking on a Dream" (Van She Tech Remix)	3:46
3.	"Walking on a Dream" (Hong Kong Blondes Remix)	7:11
4.	"Walking on a Dream" (Sam La More Remix Edit)	3:36

UK 7" single
No.	Title	Length
1.	"Walking on a Dream"	3:16
2.	"Walking on a Dream" (Sam La More Remix Edit)	3:36

iTunes exclusive single
No.	Title	Length
1.	"Walking on a Dream" (Sam La More 12" Remix)	7:52

Walking on a Dream (Reimagined) - released 26 September 2025
No.	Title	Length
1.	"Walking on a Dream"	3:16
2.	"The Thrill" (Wiz Khalifa featuring Empire of the Sun)	3:45
3.	"Walking on a Dream" (Resurrection) (with Michael Calfan and Axwell)	2:56
4.	"Walking on a Dream" (Blond:ish remix)	3:11
5.	"Walking on a Dream" (Marlon Hoffstadt remix)	3:56
6.	"Walking on a Dream" (TEED remix)	4:32
7.	"Walking on a Dream" (Kaskade remix)	6:53

== Charts ==
=== Weekly charts ===
Chart (2009–2011)	Peak position
Australia (ARIA)	10
Belgium (Ultratop 50 Flanders)	8
Belgium (Ultratop 50 Wallonia)	12
Europe (European Hot 100 Singles)	89
France (SNEP)	82
Germany (GfK)	55
Global Dance Songs (Billboard)	23
Ireland (IRMA)	8
Italy (FIMI)	16
Japan (Japan Hot 100)	13
Netherlands (Dutch Top 40)	30
Netherlands (Single Top 100)	29
New Zealand (Recorded Music NZ)	14
Scotland Singles (Official Charts)	47
Sweden (Sverigetopplistan)	52
Switzerland (Schweizer Hitparade)	21
UK Singles (Official Charts)	64

Chart (2016)	Peak position
Canada Rock (Billboard)	43
US Billboard Hot 100	65
US Adult Pop Airplay (Billboard)	23
US Dance Club Songs (Billboard)	1
US Hot Rock & Alternative Songs (Billboard)	6
US Pop Airplay (Billboard)	40
US Rock & Alternative Airplay (Billboard)	5

Chart (2025–2026)	Peak position
Hungary (Rádiós Top 40)	11
Lithuania (AGATA)	94

=== Year-end charts ===
Chart (2008)	Position
Australia (ARIA)	64

Chart (2009)	Position
Australia (ARIA)	61
Belgium (Ultratop 50 Flanders)	37
Belgium (Ultratop 50 Wallonia)	53
Hungary (Rádiós Top 40)	156
Italy (FIMI)	79
Switzerland (Schweizer Hitparade)	66

Chart (2016)	Position
US Dance Club Songs (Billboard)	35
US Hot Rock Songs (Billboard)	16
US Rock Airplay (Billboard)	15

Chart (2024)	Position
Australia Dance (ARIA)	8

Chart (2025)	Position
Belgium (Ultratop 50 Flanders)	181

== Certifications ==
Region	Certification	Certified units/sales
Australia (ARIA)	15× Platinum	1,050,000^{‡}
Brazil (Pro-Música Brasil)	Gold	30,000^{‡}
Canada (Music Canada)	5× Platinum	400,000^{‡}
Denmark (IFPI Danmark)	Platinum	90,000^{‡}
Germany (BVMI)	Gold	150,000^{‡}
Italy (FIMI)	Platinum	100,000^{‡}
New Zealand (RMNZ)	7× Platinum	210,000^{‡}
Spain (Promusicae)	Gold	30,000^{‡}
United Kingdom (BPI)	2× Platinum	1,200,000^{‡}
United States (RIAA)	Platinum	1,000,000^{‡}
^{‡} Sales+streaming figures based on certification alone.

== Release history ==
Country	Date	Label	Format
Australia	30 August 2008	Capitol; EMI	Digital download
Australia	18 October 2008	Capitol; EMI	CD single
United Kingdom	16 February 2009	Virgin	7" single
United Kingdom	6 July 2009	Virgin	CD single
Germany	11 March 2011	Capitol; EMI	CD single
United States	4 January 2016	Capitol; EMI	Mainstream radio
Various (Reimagined)	26 September 2025		Digital download

== See also ==
- "The Thrill"
- List of number-one dance singles of 2016 (U.S.)
- List of highest-certified singles in Australia
