= The Spins (song) =

2010 song by Mac Miller and Empire of the Sun

Song by Mac Miller and Empire of the Sun

from the album K.I.D.S.
- Released: August 13, 2010
- Length: 3:22
- Label: Rostrum
- Songwriter: Malcolm McCormick
- Producer: B. Jay

"The Spins" is a song by American rapper Mac Miller and Australian electronic music duo Empire of the Sun from the former's fourth mixtape K.I.D.S. (2010). Produced by B. Jay, it samples the beat and chorus of "Half Mast" by Empire of the Sun. "The Spins" stands as Mac Miller's most streamed song on Spotify, having surpassed 1 billion streams as of June 2025. On October 4, 2024, the song was released as a 7-inch vinyl single. The song's instrumental was included on the B-side of the record.

== Charts ==
Weekly chart performance
Chart (2025–2026)	Peak position
Global 200 (Billboard)	175
Ireland (IRMA)	34
Lithuania (AGATA)	89
Netherlands (Single Tip)	4
Sweden Heatseeker (Sverigetopplistan)	10
UK Indie (Official Charts)	16
UK Hip Hop/R&B (Official Charts)	26

== Certifications ==
Certifications for "The Spins"
Region	Certification	Certified units/sales
Denmark (IFPI Danmark)	Gold	45,000^{‡}
New Zealand (RMNZ)	4× Platinum	120,000^{‡}
United Kingdom (BPI)	Platinum	600,000^{‡}
United States (RIAA)	Gold	500,000^{‡}
^{‡} Sales+streaming figures based on certification alone.
