= Kamerunga (band) =

Australian musical group

- Origin: Cairns, Queensland, Australia
- Genres: Folk rock, reggae, jazz, bluegrass, world
- Years active: 2007–present
- Members: Andree Baudet; Peter Ella; Tony Hillier; Will Kepa; David Martin; Nigel Pegrum
- Past members: Ben Hakalitz

Kamerunga are an Australian folk band from Cairns, Queensland, consisting of six members. The band's music derives from traditional Celtic-influenced Australian folk music, which it mixes with elements of rock, reggae, jazz and blues. It plays classic Australian folk songs using these elements to produce eclectic and unusual versions of recognisable tunes. Instruments used in Kamerunga's music include guitar, drums, mandolin, fiddle, saxophone, keyboards and violin.

Kamerunga has released two albums to date. Both were produced by drummer Nigel Pegrum, who played in the British folk band Steeleye Span in the 1970s and '80s.

== Members ==
Kamerunga currently consists of six members.

- Andree Baudet – saxophones, keyboards, cello
- Peter Ella – acoustic and electric guitars, tenor guitar, mandolin, violin
- Tony Hillier – rhythm guitar, backing vocals
- Will Kepa – bass
- David Martin – violin, mandolin, vocals
- Nigel Pegrum – drums

Nigel Pegrum joined Kamerunga from the second album. The band's previous drummer, who played on the first album, was Ben Hakalitz, who had long been affiliated with Yothu Yindi.

== History ==
Kamerunga formed in Cairns, Queensland in 2007. It was contrived by vocalist Tony Hillier and multi-instrumentalist Peter Ella, who had been playing together in the local folk band Snake Gully since 1986. According to Hillier, the band was created specifically with "big festivals" in mind. Its debut album, The Push, was first launched at the Yungaburra Folk Festival in October 2008, and was released later in November. It was further promoted at the Woodford Folk Festival in December, and the Port Fairy Folk Festival in March 2009.

Making up The Push were several classic Australian tunes, including unique versions of "South Australia" and "The Lachlan Tigers". It also contained a tribute song to the bushman James Venture Mulligan, who explored Far North Queensland in the late 19th century.

Kamerunga's second album was produced during 2011, taking up most of the year. During the year, the band also performed at the Rainforest World Music Festival in Kuching, Borneo in July 2011. They began promoting their second album at the Port Fairy festival in February 2012. It was titled Worlds Kaleid, and was released in March. Several other well-known Australian musicians appeared on the album, including Joseph Tawadros playing the oud, Harry James Angus on trumpet, Jeff Lang on slide guitar, and Dobe Newton from The Bushwackers on lagerphone. It gained critical praise from newspapers, as well as from musicians Paul Grabowsky and Shane Howard.

== Discography ==
=== Albums ===
List of albums
Title	Album details
The Push	Released: 2008; Label: Kamerunga (KAMCD001); Formats: CD
Worlds Kaleid	Released: March 2012; Label: Kamerunga (KAMCD002); Formats: CD
Terra Australis	Released: 2014; Label: Arc Music (EUCD2529); Formats: CD, digital

== Awards ==
=== ARIA Awards ===
The ARIA Music Awards are presented annually from 1987 by the Australian Recording Industry Association (ARIA). Kamerunga was nominated for its debut album, but the award went to Seaman Dan.

Year	Nominee / work	Award	Result
2009	The Push	Best World Music Album	Nominated
