= Walking on a Dream (album) =

Studio album by Empire of the Sun
- Released: 3 October 2008
- Recorded: 2007 – September 2008
- Studios: Soundworks Music Studio, Linear Recording (Sydney)
- Genres: Synth-pop; electropop; psychedelic pop; dance-pop; dance-rock
- Length: 43:34
- Label: Capitol
- Producers: Empire of the Sun; Peter Mayes; Donnie Sloan

Empire of the Sun chronology
Walking on a Dream (2008)	Ice on the Dune (2013)

Singles from Walking on a Dream
- 1. "Walking on a Dream" Released: 30 August 2008; 2. "We Are the People" Released: 20 September 2008; 3. "Standing on the Shore" Released: 12 June 2009; 4. "Without You" Released: 25 September 2009; 5. "Half Mast (Slight Return)" Released: 15 January 2010

Walking on a Dream is the debut studio album by Australian electronic music duo Empire of the Sun, released on 3 October 2008 by Capitol Records. The album was produced by band members Luke Steele and Nick Littlemore, along with Peter Mayes and Donnie Sloan. It was recorded and mixed by Peter Mayes at Soundworks Music Studio in Sydney at various times throughout 2007, with additional recording by Chris Vallejo at Linear Recording, also in Sydney. In 2010, the song "Half Mast" was sampled on rapper Mac Miller’s song "The Spins", which was featured on his breakout mixtape K.I.D.S..

"Walking on a Dream" was released on 30 August 2008 as the album's lead single, going on to be the Empire of the Sun's biggest hit worldwide. The second single, "We Are the People", was released on 20 September 2008. The album reached number six on the Australian Albums Chart and number 19 on the UK Albums Chart, whilst hitting number one on the UK Dance Albums Chart. The album has been certified triple platinum in Australia and gold in both the United Kingdom and the United States.

Walking on a Dream received generally favourable reviews. It received 11 nominations at the ARIA Music Awards of 2009, winning seven, including Album of the Year. It was also nominated for Best International Album at the 2010 BRIT Awards. In 2010, the album was ranked at number 29 in the book 100 Best Australian Albums. A special edition of the album, containing a bonus disc of remixes, B-sides, and unreleased tracks, was released on 20 November 2009.

== Background and release ==
The album was recorded and mixed by Peter Mayes at Soundworks Music Studio in Sydney at various times throughout 2007, with additional recording by Chris Vallejo at Linear Recording, also in Sydney. According to EMI Music Australia's website, the painting of Steele and Littlemore that comprises the album artwork was based on the iconic film posters for Indiana Jones and Star Wars.

Walking on a Dream reached number six on the Australian Albums Chart and number 19 on the UK Albums Chart. The album has been certified triple platinum in Australia and gold in the United Kingdom.

"Walking on a Dream" was released on 30 August 2008 as the album's lead single. The video features Steele and Littlemore, wearing faux-oriental costumes and makeup inspired by Peking Opera, on location along the Bund in Shanghai, China between 21 and 27 July 2008.

The second single, "We Are the People", was released on 20 September 2008. The video for the song was shot in Mexico, and used the ancient Mexican festival Day of the Dead (Día de Muertos) as its inspiration. Locations included the gardens of Sir Edward James at Las Pozas, Monterrey and García.

== Critical reception ==
Professional ratings
Aggregate scores
Source	Rating
Metacritic	61/100
Review scores
Source	Rating
AllMusic	3/5 stars
Blender	3/5 stars
The Guardian	3/5 stars
The Independent	4/5 stars
musicOMH	3/5 stars
NME	8/10
The Observer	3/5 stars
Pitchfork	6.4/10
PopMatters	5/10 stars
Rolling Stone	3/5 stars

Walking on a Dream received generally positive reviews from music critics. At Metacritic, which assigns a normalised rating out of 100 to reviews from mainstream publications, the album received an average score of 61, based on 19 reviews.

Andrew Leahey of AllMusic wrote that Empire of the Sun "[festoon] their music with oddball flourishes, androgynous lyrics, and a general sense of theatricality that borders on schizophrenia", concluding, "Like the music it promotes, the cover art is purposely ludicrous, but listeners who have a palette for such whimsy should walk away happy." Martin Robinson of the NME described the duo as "silly but their songs demand to be taken seriously, just like Prince, Ultravox and Bowie." Blender's Tyler Gray stated, "Acoustic guitar strummed in time with dance beats, tinny vocals and tons of slap-back reverb—it's like some magical pop formula concocted long ago by aboriginal Australian shamen [sic] and parceled out ever since to INXS, Midnight Oil, Outback Steakhouse jingle makers and now this turquoise-loving duo." Andy Gill of The Independent opined that the songs "Walking on a Dream" and "We Are the People" "rather resemble The Beloved or Air, sharing with those duos the impression that the music just seems to have settled, like snow, around the melody."

Mike Orme of Pitchfork wrote that "at their indulgent best [the duo] strike a trenchant middle ground between fantasy and historical revisionism", but expressed that "although Empire tries mightily, they collapse underneath too many ideas before the record is even half over." Michael Cragg of musicOMH felt that the album "offers little in the way of musical experimentation" and that "[m]ost of it sounds like a strange amalgam of Fleetwood Mac and MGMT, as if the latter had been transposed from the slightly grubby streets of Brooklyn to the beaches of Australia." Christian Hoard of Rolling Stone noted that the duo "have lots of straightforward pop chops, but they prefer to get wonky with cheesetastic, Eighties-flavored keyboards and nonsense rhymes like 'Hotdog belt donut melt/Magpie knelt by itself'", adding that the album "sounds like Europop on Special K". At The Guardian, Dorian Lynskey commented that "the slick, pastel-wardrobed MOR of the title track and 'We Are the People' demonstrate melodic agility and sun-dazzled charm", but viewed the album as "a ripe cheese, best not consumed whole." Alex Denney of The Observer remarked that "the record settles upon a cooler hue, favouring minor-key shuffles that, at their best, sound like prime Bangles cuts, but tend towards pedestrian 1980s pop hackery at their worst." Tyler Fisher of PopMatters concluded that, "despite the well-developed '80s image, the music emulated is not anything worth reviving."

=== Accolades ===
The album was listed at number 29 in the book 100 Best Australian Albums, published in October 2010.

== Awards ==
=== ARIA Awards ===
The ARIA Music Awards of 2009 nominations were announced on 8 October 2009. Empire of the Sun received more nominations than any other artist, with a total of 11. The winners were announced on 26 November 2009.

Year	Nominee / work	Award	Result
2009	Walking on a Dream	Album of the Year	Won
2009	Walking on a Dream	Highest Selling Album	Nominated
2009	Walking on a Dream	Best Pop Release	Won
2009	"Walking on a Dream"	Single of the Year	Won
2009	"Walking on a Dream"	Highest Selling Single	Nominated
2009	"Walking on a Dream"	Best Video (directed by Josh Logue)	Won
2009	"We Are the People"	Best Video (directed by Josh Logue)	Nominated
2009	Empire of the Sun	Best Group	Won
2009	Empire of the Sun and Donnie Sloan with Peter Mayes	Producer of the Year	Won
2009	Aaron Hayward and David Homer from Debaser	Best Cover Art	Won
2009	Peter Mayes	Engineer of the Year	Nominated

=== Brit Awards ===
Year	Nominee / work	Award	Result
2010	Empire of the Sun	International Breakthrough Act	Nominated
2010	Walking on a Dream	International Album	Nominated

== Track listing ==
No.	Title	Writer(s)	Length
1.	"Standing on the Shore"	Luke Steele; Nick Littlemore; Peter Mayes	4:23
2.	"Walking on a Dream"	Steele; Littlemore; Jonathan Sloan	3:16
3.	"Half Mast"	Steele; Littlemore; Sloan; Mayes	3:54
4.	"We Are the People"	Steele; Littlemore; Sloan	4:27
5.	"Delta Bay"	Steele; Littlemore; Mayes	3:12
6.	"Country"	Littlemore	5:04
7.	"The World"	Steele; Littlemore; Mayes	4:36
8.	"Swordfish Hotkiss Night"	Steele; Littlemore; Mayes	3:55
9.	"Tiger by My Side"	Steele; Littlemore; Mayes	5:47
10.	"Without You"	Steele; Littlemore; Sloan	5:00

iTunes Store bonus track
No.	Title	Writer(s)	Length
11.	"Breakdown"	Steele; Littlemore; Mayes	2:37

Japanese edition bonus tracks
No.	Title	Writer(s)	Length
11.	"Romance to Me"	Littlemore	3:25
12.	"Walking on a Dream" (Van She Tech Remix)	Steele; Littlemore; Sloan	3:47
13.	"We Are the People" (The Shapeshifters Vocal Remix)	Steele; Littlemore; Sloan	4:16
14.	"Walking on a Dream" (video)	Video directed by Josh Logue	3:19

Special edition bonus disc
No.	Title	Writer(s)	Length
1.	"Breakdown"	Steele; Littlemore; Mayes	2:40
2.	"Romance to Me"	Littlemore	3:26
3.	"Walking on a Dream" (Sam La More 12" Remix)	Steele; Littlemore; Sloan	7:52
4.	"Standing on the Shore" (Losers Remix)	Steele; Littlemore; Mayes	6:39
5.	"We Are the People" (The Shapeshifters Vocal Remix)	Steele; Littlemore; Sloan	8:17
6.	"Without You" (New Version)	Steele; Littlemore; Sloan	3:32
7.	"Swordfish Hotkiss Night" (Eron Mezza Remix)	Steele; Littlemore; Mayes	2:22
8.	"Standing on the Shore" (Hey Today! Remix)	Steele; Littlemore; Mayes	4:46
9.	"Walking on a Dream" (Ben Watt Remix)	Steele; Littlemore; Sloan	7:28
10.	"We Are the People" (Shazam Remix)	Steele; Littlemore; Mayes	5:44
11.	"Girl"	Littlemore	3:58
12.	"Etude"	Littlemore	2:27

== Personnel ==
Credits adapted from the liner notes of Walking on a Dream.

- Empire of the Sun – production
- Debaser – artwork, illustrations
- Mike Marsh – mastering
- Peter Mayes – mixing, production, recording
- Donnie Sloan – production (tracks 2–4, 10)
- Chris Vallejo – additional recording

== Charts ==
=== Weekly charts ===
Chart (2009–16)	Peak position
Australian Albums (ARIA)	6
Australian Dance Albums (ARIA)	3
Austrian Albums (Ö3 Austria)	22
Belgian Albums (Ultratop Flanders)	27
Belgian Albums (Ultratop Wallonia)	37
Dutch Albums (Album Top 100)	70
European Albums (Billboard)	62
French Albums (SNEP)	60
German Albums (Offizielle Top 100)	31
Irish Albums (IRMA)	17
Italian Albums (FIMI)	27
New Zealand Albums (RMNZ)	37
Scottish Albums (Official Charts)	30
Swiss Albums (Schweizer Hitparade)	15
UK Albums (Official Charts)	19
UK Dance Albums (Official Charts)	1
US Billboard 200	97

Chart (2025–2026)	Peak position
Norwegian Albums (IFPI Norge)	74
Swedish Albums (Sverigetopplistan)	49
US Top Dance Albums (Billboard)	5
US Top Rock & Alternative Albums (Billboard)	38

=== Year-end charts ===
Chart (2009)	Position
Australian Albums (ARIA)	18
Australian Dance Albums (ARIA)	15
UK Albums (OCC)	111

Chart (2010)	Position
Australian Dance Albums (ARIA)	8

== Certifications ==
Certifications for Walking on a Dream
Region	Certification	Certified units/sales
Australia (ARIA) 10th Anniversary Edition	3× Platinum	210,000^{‡}
Denmark (IFPI Danmark)	Platinum	20,000^{‡}
Germany (BVMI)	Gold	100,000^{^}
Ireland (IRMA)	Gold	7,500^{^}
Italy (FIMI)	Gold	25,000^{‡}
New Zealand (RMNZ)	2× Platinum	30,000^{‡}
United Kingdom (BPI)	Gold	100,000^{^}
United States (RIAA)	Gold	500,000^{‡}
^{^} Shipments figures based on certification alone.^{‡} Sales+streaming figures based on certification alone.

== Release history ==
Region	Date	Edition	Label	Ref.
Australia	3 October 2008	Standard	Capitol	
Ireland	13 February 2009	Standard	Virgin	
United Kingdom	16 February 2009	Standard	Virgin	
Denmark	18 February 2009	Standard	EMI	
Finland	18 February 2009	Standard	EMI	
Norway	18 February 2009	Standard	EMI	
Sweden	18 February 2009	Standard	EMI	
Netherlands	20 February 2009	Standard	EMI	
Switzerland	20 February 2009	Standard	EMI	
Germany	13 March 2009	Standard	EMI	
France	16 March 2009	Standard	EMI	
Italy	27 March 2009	Standard	EMI	
United States	21 April 2009	Standard	Astralwerks; Virgin	
Japan	10 June 2009	Standard	EMI Japan	
Australia	20 November 2009	Special	Capitol	
Germany	20 November 2009	Special	EMI	
Italy	20 November 2009	Special	EMI	
France	23 November 2009	Special	EMI	
Denmark	25 November 2009	Special	EMI	
Finland	25 November 2009	Special	EMI	
Norway	25 November 2009	Special	EMI	
Sweden	25 November 2009	Special	EMI	
