= Linear Recording =

Recording studio in Sydney

Coordinates: 33°52′41.79″S 151°09′39.83″E

Linear Recording is a recording studio complex located in Sydney, Australia, which was established by recording engineer Christopher Vallejo and Emren Kara in 2005. Linear Recording is one of Australia's only dedicated all-analogue recording studios. Notable producers who have recorded at Linear Recording include Tony Cohen, Paul McKercher, Wayne Connelly, Nick Littlemore, Tim Whitten, Andrew Klippel, Donnie Sloan, Owen Penglis and Melvin Tree. Major acts who have recorded there include Jon Spencer Blues Explosion, Robbie Williams, Miley Cyrus, INXS, Josh Pyke, Passenger, Daniel Johns, Peking Duk, Katie Noonan, PNAU, Empire of the Sun, Wolf & Cub, Mercy Arms, Leroy Lee, The Whitlams, Jessica Mauboy, Dragon and Luke Steele.

== Equipment ==
- AWA P66500 Recording Console - one of only eleven manufactured by AWA circa. 1973
- Studer A80 MkIV 2" 24 track
- Ampex MM1200 2" 16 track
- Ampex AG440-8 1" 8-track
- Ampex ATR102 1/4" 2-track
- Ursa Major Space Station SST-282
- EMT 140 Stereo Tube Plate Reverb (x2)
- RCA Type 44-BX ribbon mic
- Wagner (Neumann) U47 tube mic

== Instruments ==
- Fender 73 Rhodes piano
- Hohner D6 Clavinet
- Hohner Pianet T
- Solina ARP String Ensemble
- Wurlitzer 206A Electric Piano
- Hammond M100 Tonewheel Organ + Leslie
- Yamaha Upright Piano
- Fender USA 40th Anniversary Stratocaster
- 4 piece 1963 Ludwig-Musser drumkit
- Fender Princeton guitar amp
- Fender Jazz Bass

== Discography ==
- Passenger ... "Whispers" (2014)
- Empire of the Sun ... "Ice on the Dune" (2013)
- Wolf & Cub ... "Heavy Weight" (2013)
- Passenger ... "All The Little Lights" (2012)
- Passenger ... "Let Her Go" (2011)
- Jon Spencer Blues Explosion ... "Black Betty" (7" US single) (2011)
- The Swiss ... "Bubble Bath" (12" single) (2009)
- Leroy Lee ... "Leroy Lee" (2009)
- Josh Pyke ... "Chimney's Afire" (2008)
- Empire of the Sun ... "Walking on a Dream" (2008)
- Van She ... "Strangers" (single) (2008)
- Mercy Arms ... "Mercy Arms" (2008)
- Katie Noonan ... "Skin" (2007)
- Damn Arms ... "The Live Artex" (2007)
- Bluebottle Kiss ... "Slight Return + Out Seeds" (2007)
- Teenager ... "Thirteen" (2007)
- Zac Hurren Trio ... "Exordium" (2007)
- The Saturns ... "Here's The Saturns" (2007)
- Bluebottle Kiss ... "Doubt Seeds" (2006)
- Lost Valentinos ... "Damn & Damn Again" (EP) (2006)
