= 2009 ARIA Music Awards =

Annual Australian music awards ceremony

- Date: 26 November 2009
- Venue: Acer Arena, Sydney, New South Wales

Highlights
- Most wins: Empire of the Sun (7)
- Most nominations: Empire of the Sun (11)
- Website: ariaawards.com.au

Television/radio coverage
- Network: Nine Network

The 23rd Annual Australian Recording Industry Association Music Awards (generally known as the ARIA Music Awards or simply the ARIAs) took place on 26 November 2009 at the Acer Arena at the Sydney Olympic Park complex. The ceremony was telecast on the Nine Network at 8:30pm that night. The nominees for all categories were announced on 8 October, with the winners of the Fine Arts Awards and Artisan Awards announced on 10 November. Biggest winners for the year were Empire of the Sun which collected a total of seven awards.

The ARIA Hall of Fame inducted: Kev Carmody, The Dingoes, Little Pattie, Mental As Anything and John Paul Young.

== Ceremony details ==
The ceremony was hosted by Gyton Grantley and Kate Ritchie with presenters including Ruby Rose, Missy Higgins, Powderfinger, Orianthi, Vanessa Amorosi, Guy Sebastian, Natalie Bassingthwaighte, Richard Wilkins, Lee Kernaghan, Daniel Merriweather, Jabba, Jason Dundas, Natalie Gruzlewski, John Butler, Keith Urban, Tim Ross (Rosso), Cassie Davis, Andrew G, Jimmy Barnes, Marieke Hardy, Lindsay McDougall, Rove McManus and Robbie Williams.

Performers were The Temper Trap, Keith Urban, Jessica Mauboy, Hilltop Hoods, Empire of the Sun, Sarah Blasko, Lisa Mitchell, Kate Miller-Heidke, Sydney Children's Choir, Ladyhawke and Robbie Williams, who performed his new single "Bodies".

== Multiple winners and nominees ==
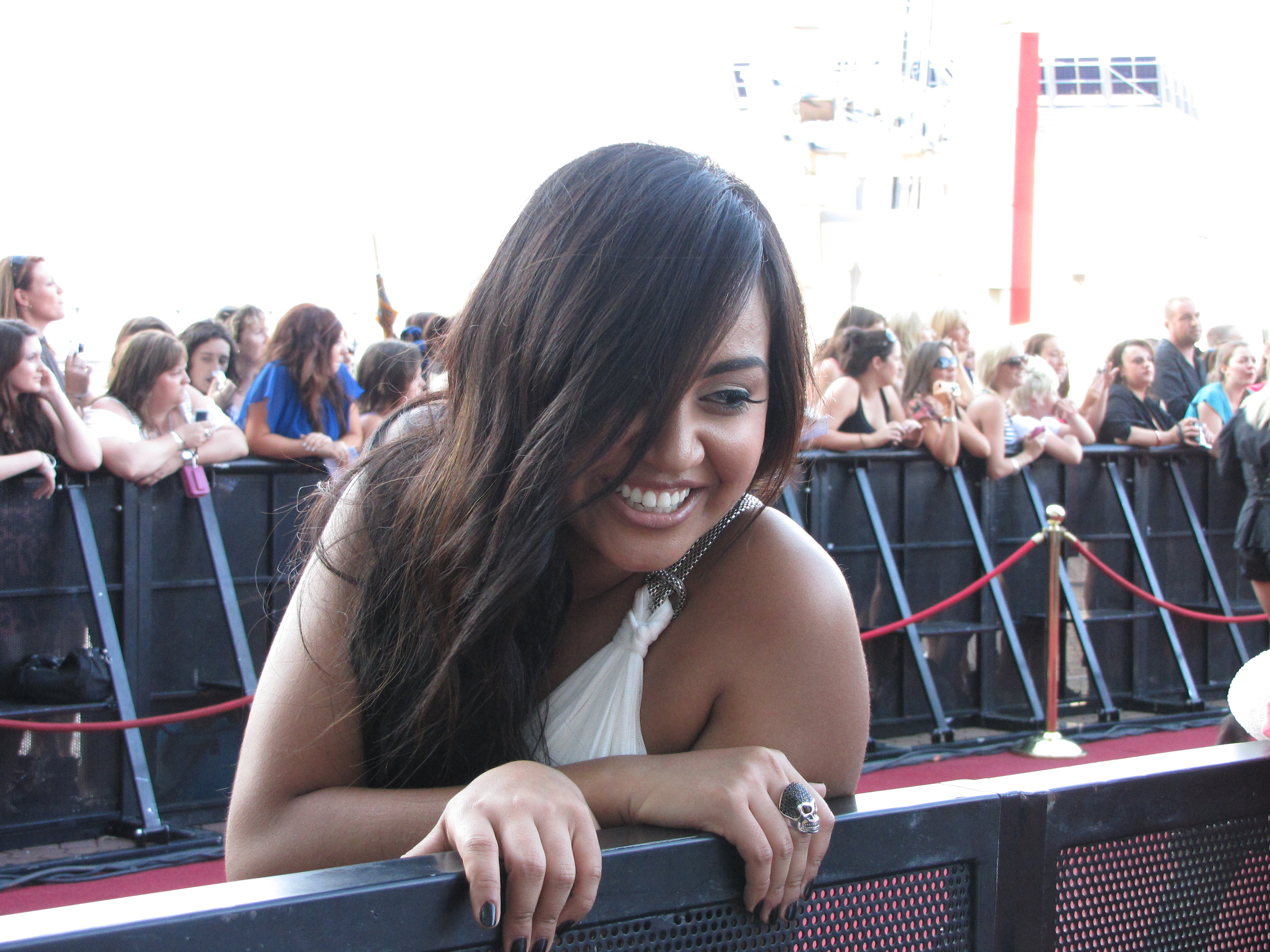
Jessica Mauboy at the ARIA Music Awards red carpet.

- Empire of the Sun – 7 awards from 11 nominations
- Hilltop Hoods – 2 awards from 6 nominations
- Ladyhawke – 2 awards from 6 nominations
- AC/DC – 2 awards from 4 nominations
- Jessica Mauboy – 1 award from 7 nominations
- Sarah Blasko – 1 award from 5 nominations
- C. W. Stoneking – 1 award from 4 nominations
- Eskimo Joe – 5 nominations
- Kate Miller-Heidke – 4 nominations
- The Temper Trap – 4 nominations
- Lisa Mitchell – 3 nominations

== Awards ==
Nominees and winners with results indicated on the right.

=== ARIA Awards ===
Album of the Year
Artist		Album	Result
AC/DC		Black Ice	Nominated
Empire of the Sun		Walking on a Dream	Won
Eskimo Joe		Inshalla	Nominated
Sarah Blasko		As Day Follows Night	Nominated
The Temper Trap		Conditions	Nominated
Single of the Year
Artist		Single	Result
Empire of the Sun		"Walking on a Dream"	Won
Hilltop Hoods		"Chase That Feeling"	Nominated
Kate Miller-Heidke		"The Last Day on Earth"	Nominated
Ladyhawke		"My Delirium"	Nominated
The Temper Trap		"Sweet Disposition"	Nominated
Highest Selling Album
Artist		Album	Result
AC/DC		Black Ice	Won
Empire of the Sun		Walking on a Dream	Nominated
Hilltop Hoods		State of the Art	Nominated
Jessica Mauboy		Been Waiting	Nominated
The Presets		Apocalypso	Nominated
Highest Selling Single
Artist		Single	Result
Empire of the Sun		"Walking on a Dream"	Nominated
Evermore		"Hey Boys and Girls"	Nominated
Jessica Mauboy		"Burn"	Nominated
Jessica Mauboy		"Running Back" (with Flo Rida)	Won
Wes Carr		"You"	Nominated
Best Group
Artist		Release	Result
AC/DC		Black Ice	Nominated
Empire of the Sun		Walking on a Dream	Won
Eskimo Joe		Inshalla	Nominated
Hilltop Hoods		State of the Art	Nominated
The Drones		Havilah	Nominated
Best Female Artist
Artist		Release	Result
Jessica Mauboy		Been Waiting	Nominated
Kate Miller-Heidke		Curiouser	Nominated
Ladyhawke		Ladyhawke	Nominated
Lisa Mitchell		Wonder	Nominated
Sarah Blasko		As Day Follows Night	Won
Best Male Artist
Artist		Release	Result
Bob Evans		Goodnight, Bull Creek!	Nominated
C. W. Stoneking		Jungle Blues	Nominated
Daniel Merriweather		Love & War	Won
Josh Pyke		Chimney's Afire	Nominated
Paul Dempsey		Everything Is True	Nominated
Breakthrough Artist – Album
Artist		Album	Result
Jessica Mauboy		Been Waiting	Nominated
Ladyhawke		Ladyhawke	Won
Lisa Mitchell		Wonder	Nominated
Sia		Some People Have Real Problems	Nominated (Note: Despite the ARIA Awards website saying C. W. Stoneking was nominated for this award, the video for this award on the Official ARIA YouTube channel shows that Sia was nominated. This is the video: https://www.youtube.com/watch?v=DryNVmJ_AHs)
The Temper Trap		Conditions	Nominated
Breakthrough Artist – Single
Artist		Single	Result
Art vs. Science		"Art vs. Science"	Nominated
Bluejuice		"Broken Leg"	Nominated
Jessica Mauboy		"Running Back" (with Flo Rida)	Nominated
Ladyhawke		"My Delirium"	Won
Lisa Mitchell		"Coin Laundry"	Nominated
Best Pop Release
Artist		Release	Result
Empire of the Sun		Walking on a Dream	Won
Jessica Mauboy		Been Waiting	Nominated
Kate Miller-Heidke		Curiouser	Nominated
Ladyhawke		Ladyhawke	Nominated
Sarah Blasko		As Day Follows Night	Nominated
Best Rock Album
Artist		Album	Result
AC/DC		Black Ice	Won
Eskimo Joe		Inshalla	Nominated
Jet		Shaka Rock	Nominated
The Drones		Havilah	Nominated
The Temper Trap		Conditions	Nominated
Best Dance Release
Artist		Release	Result
Hook n Sling		"The Best Thing"	Nominated
Sneaky Sound System		2	Nominated
The Presets		"Talk Like That"	Won
Tommy Trash		"Need Me to Stay" (with Mr Wilson)	Nominated
Zoe Badwi		"Release Me"	Nominated
Best Children's Album
Artist		Album	Result
Bindi Irwin		Bindi Kidfitness 2 Jungle Dance Party	Nominated
The Fairies		Princess Perfect	Nominated
Georgie Parker		Here Comes the Sun	Nominated
The Saddle Club		Best Friends	Nominated
The Wiggles		Go Bananas!	Won
Best Country Album
Artist		Album	Result
Felicity Urquhart		Landing Lights	Nominated
Jasmine Rae		Look It Up	Nominated
Keith Urban		Defying Gravity	Nominated
Shane Nicholson		Familiar Ghosts	Nominated
Troy Cassar-Daley		I Love This Place	Won
Best Independent Release
Artist		Release	Result
Bertie Blackman		Secrets and Lies	Won
C. W. Stoneking		Jungle Blues	Nominated
Dappled Cities		Zounds	Nominated
Sneaky Sound System		2	Nominated
The Drones		Havilah	Nominated
Best Urban Album
Artist		Album	Result
Astronomy Class		Pursuit of Happiness	Nominated
Hilltop Hoods		State of the Art	Won
Horrorshow		The Grey Space	Nominated
Pez		A Mind of My Own	Nominated
Phrase		Clockwork	Nominated
Best Blues and Roots Album
Artist		Album	Result
Ash Grunwald		Fish Out of Water	Nominated
C. W. Stoneking		Jungle Blues	Won
Pete Murray		Chance to Say Goodbye	Nominated
The Waifs		Live from the Union of the Soul	Nominated
The Wilson Pickers		The Land of the Powerful Owl	Nominated
Best Adult Contemporary Album
Artist		Album	Result
Bob Evans		Goodnight, Bull Creek!	Nominated
David Campbell		Good Lovin'	Nominated
Josh Pyke		Chimney's Afire	Won
Little Birdy		Confetti	Nominated
Paul Dempsey		Everything Is True	Nominated
Best Comedy Release
Artist		Release	Result
Dave Hughes		Dave Hughes Is Handy	Nominated
Hamish & Andy		Unessential Listening	Won
Rodney Rude		Rodney Rude Goes the Growl	Nominated
The BBQ Kings (Pat Drummond, Tony Williams & Chris O'Leary)		The Fellowship of the Grill	Nominated
Tripod		For the Love of God!	Nominated
Best Music DVD
Artist		DVD	Result
Jimmy Barnes		Live at the Enmore	Nominated
Kasey Chambers & Shane Nicholson		Rattlin' Bones Max Sessions	Nominated
Sia		TV Is My Parent	Won
The Cat Empire		Live at the Bowl	Nominated
Various		RocKwiz Salutes the Bowl	Nominated
=== Fine Arts Awards ===
Best Jazz Album
Artist		Album	Result
Dale Barlow, George Coleman Jr, Mark Fitzgibbon, Sam Anning		Treat Me Gently	Nominated
Kate Ceberano, Mark Isham		Bittersweet	Nominated
Katie Noonan		Blackbird: The Music of Lennon and McCartney	Won
Mark Isaacs Resurgence Band		Tell It Like It Is	Nominated
Michelle Nicolle		The Loveliest Night	Nominated
Best Classical Album
Artist		Album	Result
Australian Brandenburg Orchestra, Paul Dyer		Handel: Concert Grossi Opus 6	Won
Australian Chamber Orchestra		Classical Destinations II	Nominated
Emma Matthews		Emma Matthews in Monte Carlo	Nominated
Slava & Leonard Grigoryan		Distance	Nominated
Teddy Tahu Rhodes, David Hobson		You'll Never Walk Alone	Nominated
Goldner String Quartet		Beethoven: The Complete String Quartets	Nominated
Best Original Soundtrack / Cast / Show Album
Artist		Album	Result
Amanda Brown		Son of a Lion Original Soundtrack	Nominated
Soundtrack		Balibo	Won
Soundtrack		Samson and Delilah	Nominated
Soundtrack		East of Everything Series Two Soundtrack Album	Nominated
Tex Perkins, Murray Paterson		Beautiful Kate	Nominated
Best World Music Album
Artist		Album	Result
Fiona Joy Hawkins		Blue Dream	Nominated
Kamerunga		The Push	Nominated
Seaman Dan		Sailing Home	Won
Warren Fahey		Australia: Folk Songs & Bush Verse	Nominated
Wicked Beat Sound System		Dreaming	Nominated
=== Artisan Awards ===
Producer of the Year
Producer	Musical artist	Release	Result
Empire of the Sun, Donnie Sloan, Peter Mayes	Empire of the Sun	Walking on a Dream	Won
Forrester Savell	Karnivool	Sound Awake	Nominated
Suffa	Hilltop Hoods	State of the Art	Nominated
Tim Powles	Regular John	The Peaceful Atom Is a Bomb	Nominated
Wayne Connolly, Paul Dempsey	Paul Dempsey	Everything Is True	Nominated
Engineer of the Year
Engineer	Musical artist	Release	Result
DJ Debris	Hilltop Hoods	State of the Art	Won
Greg Wales	You Am I	Dilettantes	Won
Jimi Maroudas	Eskimo Joe	Inshalla	Nominated
Pete Mayes	Empire of the Sun	Walking on a Dream	Nominated
Steven Schram	Little Birdy	Confetti	Nominated
Best Video
Director	Musical artist	Single	Result
Head Pictures, Damon Escott, Stephen Lance	Sarah Blasko	"All I Want"	Nominated
Josh Logue for Mathematics	Empire of the Sun	"Walking on a Dream"	Won
Josh Logue for Mathematics	Empire of the Sun	"We Are the People"	Nominated
Mark Alston	Kate Miller-Heidke	"The Last Day on Earth"	Nominated
Sam Bennetts	Bluejuice	"Broken Leg"	Nominated
Best Cover Art
Cover artist	Musical artist	Album	Result
Aaron Hayward, David Homer Debaser	Empire of the Sun	Walking on a Dream	Won
C. W. Stoneking	C. W. Stoneking	Jungle Blues	Nominated
Mathematics	Eskimo Joe	Inshalla	Nominated
Sarah Larnach	Ladyhawke	Ladyhawke	Nominated
Sharon Chai	Sarah Blasko	As Day Follows Night	Nominated

== ARIA Hall of Fame Inductees ==
The following were inducted into the 2009 ARIA Hall of Fame on 27 August at Melbourne's Forum Theatre:

- Kev Carmody
- The Dingoes
- Little Pattie
- Mental As Anything
- John Paul Young

== Judging academy ==
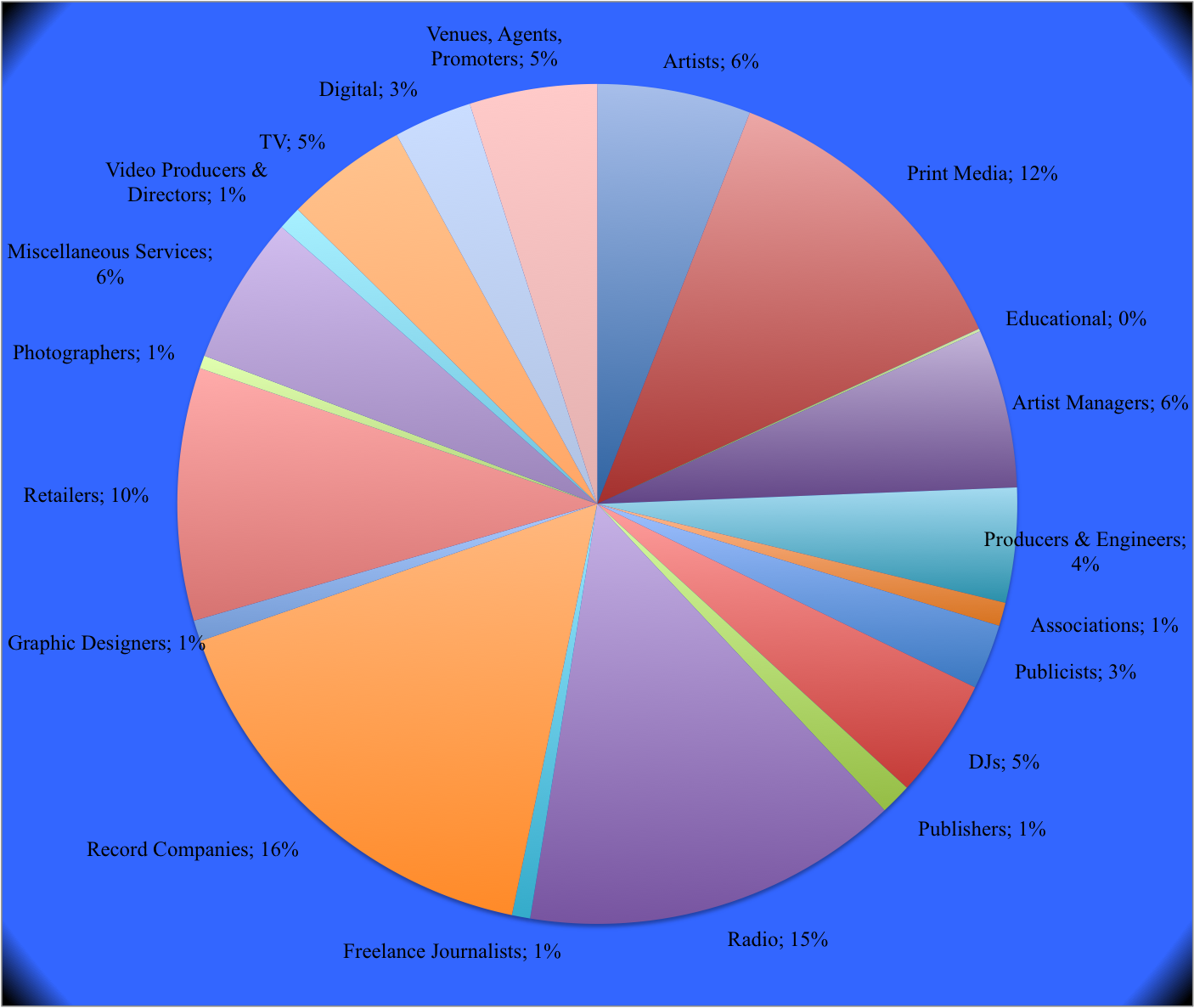
A breakdown of the 2009 judging academy.

In 2009, the generalist categories were determined by the "voting academy", which consisted of about 1000 representatives from across the music industry. (See pie chart at right for percentage breakdowns.)

Members of the academy are kept secret. Membership is by invitation only. An individual record company may have up to eight members on the academy. The only artists eligible to vote are winners and nominees from the previous year's awards.

== See also ==
- Music of Australia
