= Empire of the Sun (band) =

Australian electronic music duo

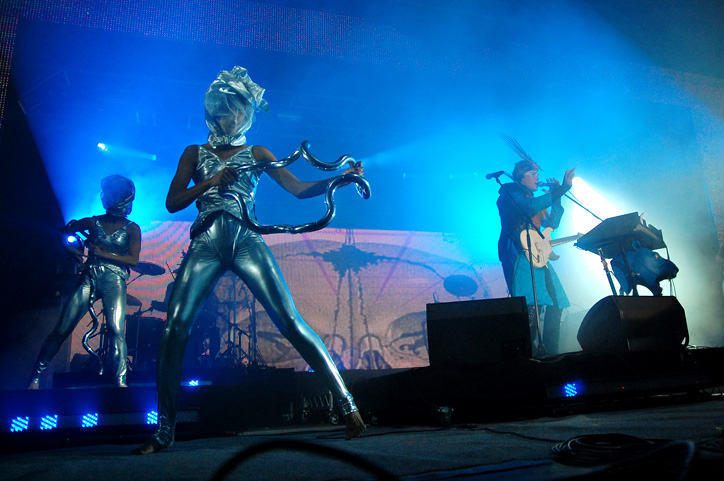
- Empire of the Sun performing at Parklife Music Festival in September 2009

Background information
- Origin: Sydney, New South Wales, Australia
- Genres: Electropop; synth-pop; dance-rock; electro-rock; new wave
- Years active: 2007–present
- Labels: Capitol; Virgin EMI; EMI Australia
- Spinoff of: The Sleepy Jackson, PNAU
- Members: Luke Steele; Nick Littlemore
- Website: empireofthesun.co

Empire of the Sun are an Australian electronic music duo formed in 2007. The duo is a collaboration between Luke Steele of alternative rock band The Sleepy Jackson, and Nick Littlemore of electronic dance band Pnau.

Empire of the Sun's 2008 debut album, Walking on a Dream, brought the duo international success and has been certified double platinum in Australia and gold in the United Kingdom. The album provided a number of internationally charting singles including the title track, which peaked at number ten on the Australian ARIA Singles Chart, and "We Are the People", which peaked at number fourteen on the UK Singles Chart. The band's second album, Ice on the Dune, was released in June 2013, while their third album Two Vines was released in October 2016. A fourth album, Ask That God, was released in July 2024.

The duo have won a number of Australian music awards, with Walking on a Dream receiving 11 nominations at the ARIA Music Awards of 2009 and winning seven – including Album of the Year. As a live band, they have performed internationally and are known for their flamboyant costumes and elaborate stage sets.

== History ==
=== 2000–2007: Formation ===
Luke Steele and Nick Littlemore met in 2000 after being introduced by Steele's A&R executive, Simon Moor, in a bar in Sydney. At the time, both were signed to EMI and had already been working on different projects. Over the following years, the two collaborated on a number of occasions. Littlemore helped write the song "Tell the Girls That I'm Not Hangin' Out", which appeared on The Sleepy Jackson's 2003 debut album, Lovers, and Steele had some artistic input in Littlemore's 2006 art-rock project Teenager. After a falling out over the song on Lovers the co-operation ceased for a while, with Littlemore commenting "I'm a very intense person and I take things to heart".

The two reconvened in 2006 to work on two songs for the Pnau album that was released in late 2007. They collaborated on the tracks "Freedom" and the opener "With You Forever" where Steele supplied the vocal. This prompted a change in direction for the band who began to craft a work more vocally-centered album featuring guest performances. A track-by-track analysis of the album Pnau revealed that writing of "With You Forever" with Luke Steele inspired Littlemore's band to begin work on a collaborative project. Littlemore said, "We fell in love with music again with [With You Forever]; I think this is [Pnau's] first great song." The release of Pnau brought an interest from Elton John, who signed Littlemore to his management company.

The new project began to develop under the working title of "Steelemore" as a collaboration between Steele and Littlemore, with Pnau partner Peter Mayes listed as a producer and occasional co-writer. As Steele was living in Perth and Littlemore was in Sydney, the two spent time writing songs away from each other while meeting occasionally in Sydney to decide on the musical direction and style. When they had accumulated enough material, Mayes and duo began to record the album throughout 2007 with the assistance of Jonathan Sloan.

=== 2007–2012: Walking on a Dream ===
While the record had been largely recorded and mixed throughout 2007, the self-titled Pnau album took precedence for Littlemore and Mayes in the first half of 2008. The duo put out the title-track "Walking on a Dream" in anticipation of the album's release. It appeared in digital format on 30 August 2008, and received airtime on Australian radio and reached number ten on the Australian ARIA Singles Chart. A second single, titled "We Are the People", was released on 30 September and peaked at number twenty-four in Australia. The album Walking on a Dream appeared on 3 October 2008 and debuted at number eight on the ARIA Albums Charts, peaking at number six. The duo embarked on an international promotional tour in support of the album that was released in Europe in February/March 2009 followed by a North American release in April of the same year. While the project had initially been conceived as studio-only, the growing success brought "an audience [to which] we felt a duty to be good to them". Upon their return to Australia Steele began to prepare for a live debut of the band at Parklife Festival in September and October 2009. They headlined three shows, described as a visual "overload [where] giant graphics swam and spun over the stage as costumed dancers writhed to the beat and Steele on a pedestal onstage, [wearing] a gigantic metallic headpiece and his usual 'Ming The Merciless' robe". A third single, "Standing on the Shore" was released in June 2009 however promotion was scaled back when Steele suffered from exhaustion. A remixed version "Without You" was released as the album's fourth single the following September.

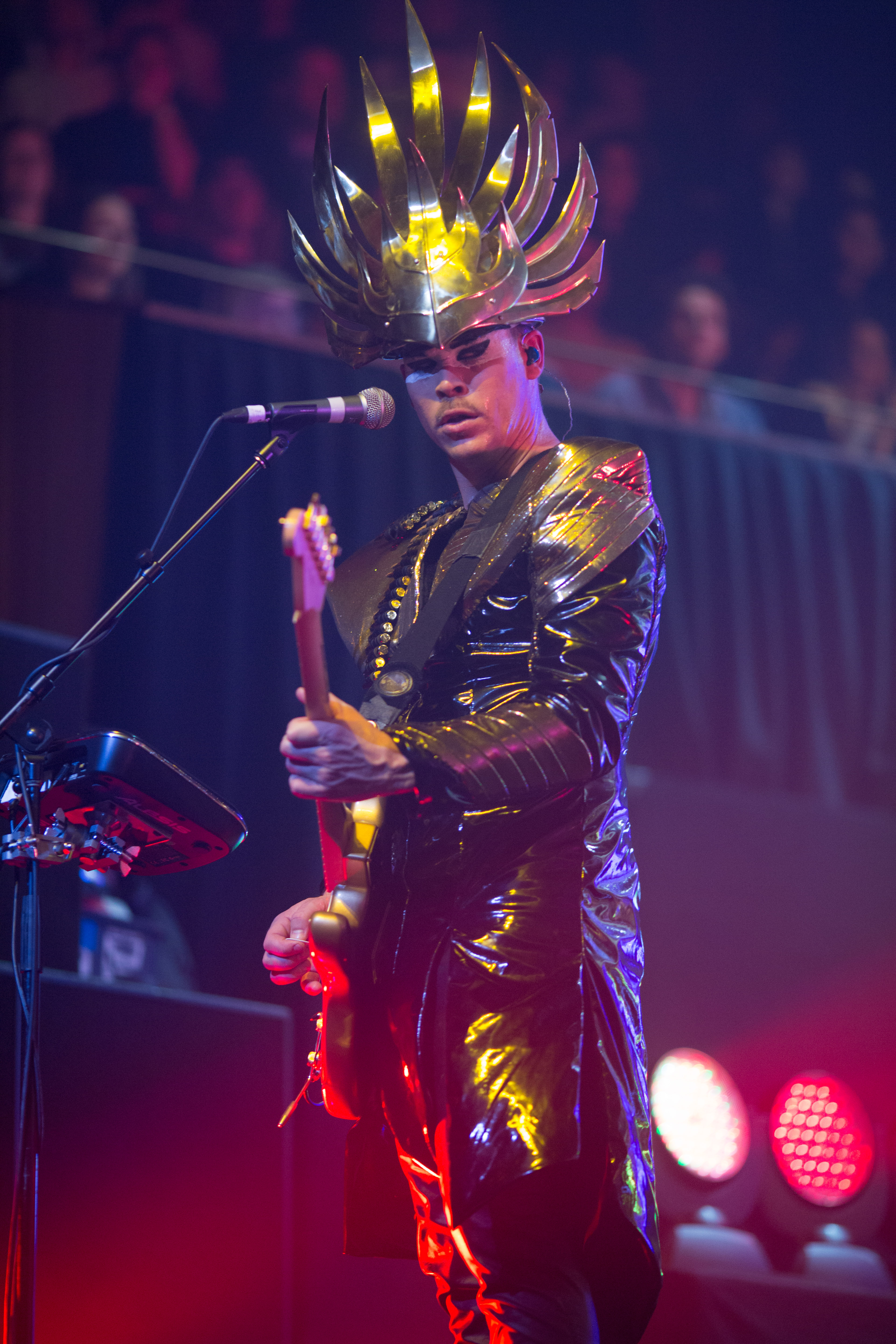
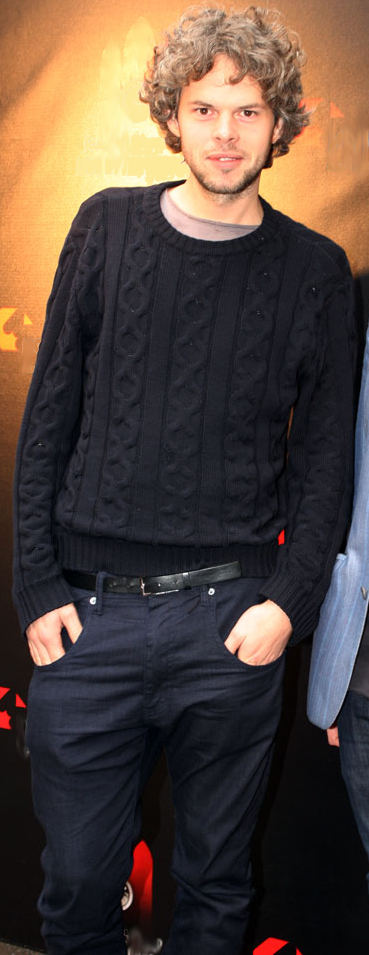
Luke Steele (left) and Nick Littlemore (right), the members of Empire of the Sun

Littlemore decided to opt out of performing with the band live, citing 'I’ve always felt that once you make a record it's not yours anymore'. Steele gave the impression that his partner left the band in September 2009, however, Littlemore resurfaced in the following month, citing his production work and a project with Cirque du Soleil as the reason for the lack of communication. In September 2009 the group began to work on their 2013 album Ice on the Dune, which they finished in May 2013. He divided his time between the UK and Montreal while working on other creative commitments. Steele continued to perform live with the band at a number of Australian outdoor events. Towards the end of 2009, the band received a number of ARIA Awards for Walking on a Dream, including Best Album of the Year.

The band performed as a co-headliner at the touring Future Music Festival around Australia in February/March 2010. The band made their international debut at the Vive Latino Festival in Mexico City in April of that same year. They moved to Europe for the summer festival season where they performed at among others Glastonbury and Rock Werchter. The band made their American debut at the Lollapalooza festival. In October 2010, "We Are the People" was used as the soundtrack for a Vodafone TV commercial in Germany and subsequently topped the German Singles Chart. In November 2010, Littlemore indicated that he had "talked to Luke (Steele) the other day; we're doing a new record. We've already written a couple of tunes. You know when it's right I guess". In July 2011, Littlemore announced that the band had gone into the studio at the end of June to begin working on a second Empire of the Sun album while he confirmed would "come on board this time, actually come together and tour". As recording continued, Littlemore continued to have Pnau related commitments, releasing the album Soft Universe in 2011 and the Elton John remix album Good Morning to the Night in 2012.

=== 2012–2016: Ice on the Dune ===
In September 2009 the group started to record their June 2013 album, not finished until May 2013. For much of 2012, the duo and their collaborators spent time recording material while Steele and the band retired from touring. On 11 March 2013, the band revealed a trailer for their second album entitled Ice on the Dune directed by J. D. Dillard and confirmed the release date as June 2013. The lead single "Alive" was released on 16 April and on the same day, the album was made available for pre-order on iTunes. The single had moderate success in Australia and Europe. On 18 April 2013, the Farrelly brothers announced that the band would score Dumb and Dumber To. Ice on the Dune was released on 14 June 2013 in Australia and New Zealand. Steele would later describe the lack of success of the album as part of their progression as a band.

Steele received global media attention following an interview he completed with music publication NME in August 2013 at the Sziget Festival in Budapest. During the interview, Steele compared Ice on the Dune with Daft Punk's 2013 album release Random Access Memories, stating: "They had a great marketing campaign, but we’ve got better songs." In 2014 the band performed at the Coachella Festival, headlining the Sahara Tent.

"Alive" was used in the introduction video for Google I/O 2013. It was also played within the introduction video of the new Yahoo! logo on 5 September 2013, played over the end credits of the 2013 film Paranoia, and featured in the movie Dumb and Dumber To. "Alive" was also a featured song on the soundtrack of the EA Sports game, FIFA 14.

In December 2014, Empire of the Sun released two songs, "Tonight" and "Wandering Star", which were written for the Farrelly brothers film, Dumb and Dumber To. For much of 2015, the duo were writing and recording of their third album in Hawaii and Los Angeles. By the end of the year, Steele noted that the new release was "75 percent there".

The band continued to perform live in the second half of 2015, including a show at the Hollywood Bowl.

In January 2016, the band's 2008 album title track "Walking on a Dream" was featured in a national commercial titled "The Dreamer" in the United States for the Japanese automaker Honda to promote the 2016 Honda Civic. The song finally led to the US chart breakthrough for the band, peaking at number 3 on Billboard's Alternative music charts, topping the dance music charts, and peaking at number 40 on the Mainstream Top 40 chart.

=== 2016–2017: Two Vines ===
In August 2016, it was announced that the third album Two Vines was set for release on 28 October 2016. The album was co-produced by Peter Mayes and features contributions by Lindsey Buckingham, Wendy Melvoin, and former David Bowie collaborators Henry Hey and Tim Lefebvre. The 15-track album includes a remix of the song "Walking on a Dream" and was partly recorded in Hawaii. Littlemore explained the inspiration behind the title as "this image of a modern city overtaken by jungle". The first single "High and Low" was released on 24 August. "High and Low" was also featured in the EA Sports game, FIFA 17.

In an interview with Billboard in August 2017, Steele announced that he and Littlemore had recently started working on their fourth album in Japan, and that a music video for "Way to Go" was also shot in Japan. He spoke of how he loves Japanese music, and that a koto player came in for a day. They completed four tracks in Tokyo only. Two of these were later released on Ask That God, serving as its final two cuts.

In September 2017, DS Automobiles released a video featuring a new exclusive Empire song, "On Our Way Home", starring the Ukrainian actress and model Alina Kovalenko.

=== 2021–2027: Ask That God ===
In a podcast interview with The Plug with Neil Griffiths on 6 October 2021, Littlemore said that the band had been struggling to write new music remotely over Zoom during the COVID-19 pandemic, and assured fans that new music was being composed.

In February 2022, Luke Steele announced a debut solo studio album, Listen to the Water and released its lead single, "Common Man", on 11 February 2022.

In October 2023, the band announced on their official Instagram page that "AEIOU", a collaboration with Pnau would be released 13 October 2023.

In March 2024, the group's social media platforms became deserted of all previous media, including the profile picture changing to black. The pages soon began to tease a new single: "Changes", which was released on 5 April 2024.

The band released their next single, "Music on the Radio", on 17 May 2024. Their fourth studio album (and first in eight years), Ask That God, was released on 26 July 2024. Steele then embarked on an extensive worldwide tour, which began in Australia in October 2024, and is set to conclude in Australia in March 2027.

=== Untitled fifth album ===
Following the release of Ask That God in 2024, Littlemore and Steele immediately began working on the band's fifth album. In August 2026, Littlemore said that the fifth album "will probably come out within the next year".

== Name ==
Although the name of the final project has been attributed to the 1984 novel of the same name by J. G. Ballard, Littlemore denied this and offers an explanation. He stated: "the name comes more from the idea of ... the fact that we're traveling around the world going to all the places of empires of the civilization where the sun has been a theme of worship. It's not based on the Ballard novel nor the Spielberg film of the same name."

== Style ==
The band employs elaborate stage sets and headdress (such as wearing kabuto, war bonnets and war paint), which reflects the duo's background in visual art. Littlemore explained that "we did see Alejandro Jodorowsky's Holy Mountain and it influenced the way we could think about visualization". The band has worked with a number of designers, including Jessica Huerta. Steele described the inspiration for the visual aspect as "the vision of this band, it's built on imagination, so it comes from studying the samurais in art school to digital graphics, to topography, to filming under the ocean, to oil paintings, anything really."

== Discography ==
=== Studio albums ===
List of studio albums, with selected chart positions and certifications
Title	Album details	Peak chart positions										Certifications
Title	Album details	AUS	AUT	BEL (FL)	GER	IRE	ITA	NZ	SWI	UK	US	Certifications
Walking on a Dream	Released: 3 October 2008; Label: Capitol; Formats: CD, LP, digital download, streaming	6	22	27	31	17	27	37	15	19	97	ARIA: 3× Platinum; BPI: Gold; BVMI: Gold; FIMI: Gold; IRMA: Gold; RIAA: Gold; RMNZ: 2× Platinum
Ice on the Dune	Released: 14 June 2013; Label: Capitol; Formats: CD, LP, digital download, streaming	3	37	40	34	26	41	16	7	24	20	ARIA: Gold
Two Vines	Released: 28 October 2016; Label: Virgin EMI; Formats: CD, LP, digital download, streaming	7	—	66	—	78	—	— (Note: Two Vines did not enter the NZ Top 40 Albums Chart, but peaked at number two on the NZ Heatseeker Albums Chart.)	42	42	51	
Ask That God	Released: 26 July 2024; Label: EMI Australia, Capitol; Formats: CD, LP, digital download, streaming	10	—	113	58	—	—	—	17	—	—	
"—" denotes an album that did not chart or was not released.

=== Singles ===
List of singles with selected chart positions and certifications, showing album name and year released
Title	Year	Peak chart positions										Certifications	Album
Title	Year	AUS	AUT	BEL (FL)	GER	IRE	ITA	NZ	SWI	UK	US	Certifications	Album
"Walking on a Dream"	2008	10	—	8	55	8	16	14	21	64	65	ARIA: 15× Platinum; BPI: 2× Platinum; BVMI: Gold; FIMI: Platinum; RIAA: Platinum; RMNZ: 7× Platinum	Walking on a Dream
"We Are the People"	2008	24	2	20	1	23	19	— (Note: "We Are the People" did not enter the NZ Top 40 Singles Chart, but peaked at number 21 on the NZ Catalogue Singles Chart.)	20	14	— (Note: "We Are the People" did not enter the Billboard Hot 100 but peaked at number 3 on the Bubbling Under Hot 100, a 25-song extension to the Hot 100.)	ARIA: 7× Platinum; BPI: 2× Platinum; BVMI: 3× Gold; FIMI: Gold; IFPI AUT: Gold; IFPI SWI: Gold; RMNZ: 4× Platinum	Walking on a Dream
"Standing on the Shore"	2009	—	—	— (Note: "Standing on the Shore" did not enter the Flanders Ultratop 50, but peaked at number 13 on the Ultratip chart.)	—	—	—	—	—	—	—		Walking on a Dream
"Without You"	2009	—	—	—	—	—	—	—	—	—	—		Walking on a Dream
"Half Mast (Slight Return)"	2009	—	—	—	—	—	—	—	—	—	—	ARIA: Gold	Walking on a Dream
"Alive"	2013	22	16	— (Note: "Alive" did not enter the Flanders Ultratop 50, but peaked at number 13 on the Ultratip chart.)	39	39	9	—	25	83	— (Note: "Alive" did not enter the Billboard Hot 100, but peaked at number nine on the Hot Singles Sales chart.)	ARIA: 5× Platinum; BPI: Silver; FIMI: Platinum; RIAA: Gold; RMNZ: Platinum	Ice on the Dune
"DNA"	2013	—	—	— (Note: "DNA" did not enter the Flanders Ultratop 50, but peaked at number 26 on the Ultratip chart.)	—	—	—	—	—	—	—		Ice on the Dune
"Celebrate"	2013	—	—	—	—	—	—	—	—	—	—		Ice on the Dune
"High and Low"	2016	66	—	— (Note: "High and Low" did not enter the Flanders Ultratop 50, but charted as an "extra tip" on the Ultratip chart.)	—	—	—	—	—	—	—	ARIA: 2× Platinum; RMNZ: Gold	Two Vines
"To Her Door"	2016	—	—	—	—	—	—	—	—	—	—		Two Vines
"Way to Go"	2017	—	—	—	—	—	—	—	—	—	—		Two Vines
"On Our Way Home"	2017	—	—	—	—	—	—	—	—	—	—		Non-album single
"Chrysalis"	2019	—	—	—	—	—	—	—	—	—	—		Walking on a Dream: 10th Anniversary
"The Thrill" (with Wiz Khalifa)	2020	—	—	—	—	—	—	— (Note: "The Thrill" did not enter the NZ Top 40 Singles Chart, but peaked at number 35 on the NZ Hot Singles Chart.)	—	—	—	BPI: Gold; RIAA: Platinum; RMNZ: 3× Platinum	Burn After Rolling
"AEIOU" (with Pnau)	2023	—	—	—	—	—	—	—	—	—	—		Hyperbolic/Ask That God
"Changes"	2024	— (Note: "Changes" did not enter the Australian top 100 ARIA Singles Chart but peaked at number 48 on the ARIA Digital Track Chart.)	—	—	—	—	—	— (Note: "Changes" did not enter the NZ Top 40 Singles Chart, but peaked at number 37 on the NZ Hot Singles Chart.)	—	— (Note: "Changes" did not enter the UK Singles Chart, but peaked at number six on the UK Physical Singles Chart.)	—		Ask That God
"Music on the Radio"	2024	— (Note: "Music on the Radio" did not enter the Australian top 100 ARIA Singles Chart but peaked at number 44 on the ARIA Digital Track Chart.)	—	—	—	—	—	— (Note: "Music on the Radio" did not enter the NZ Top 40 Singles Chart, but peaked at number 19 on the NZ Hot Singles Chart.)	—	— (Note: "Music on the Radio" did not enter the UK Singles Chart, but peaked at number nine on the UK Physical Singles Chart.)	—		Ask That God
"Cherry Blossom"	2024	—	—	—	—	—	—	— (Note: "Cherry Blossom" did not enter the NZ Top 40 Singles Chart, but peaked at number 35 on the NZ Hot Singles Chart.)	—	— (Note: "Cherry Blossom" did not enter the UK Singles Chart, but peaked at number 15 on the UK Physical Singles Chart.)	—		Ask That God
"The Feeling You Get"	2024	—	—	—	—	—	—	— (Note: "The Feeling You Get" did not enter the NZ Top 40 Singles Chart, but peaked at number 31 on the NZ Hot Singles Chart.)	—	—	—		Ask That God
"Somebody's Son" (featuring Lindsey Buckingham)	2025	—	—	—	—	—	—	— (Note: "Somebody's Son" did not enter the NZ Top 40 Singles Chart, but peaked at number 36 on the NZ Hot Singles Chart.)	—	—	—		Ask That God (Deluxe)
"Llego" (with Danny Ocean)	2026	—	—	—	—	—	—	—	—	—	—		
"—" denotes a recording that did not chart or was not released in that territory.

==== Promotional singles ====
Title	Year	Peak chart positions	Album
Title	Year	NZ Heat.	Album
"Two Vines"	2016	8	Two Vines

=== Other appearances ===
Title	Year	Album
"The Spins" (Mac Miller with Empire of the Sun)	2010	K.I.D.S.
"The Dream Time Machine" (WZRD featuring Empire of the Sun)	2012	WZRD

=== Remixes ===
Title	Year	Artist
"Applause"	2013	Lady Gaga

=== Music videos ===
Title	Year	Director(s)	Notes
"Walking on a Dream"	2008	Josh Logue	Filmed in Shanghai, China.
"We Are the People"	2008	Josh Logue	Filmed at Mina, Nuevo León, and Xilitla, San Luis Potosí in Mexico.
"Standing on the Shore"	2009	Josh Logue	Filmed at Lancelin, north of Perth, Australia.
"Without You"	2009	Josh Logue	Filmed at FOX Studios, Sydney, Australia.
"Half Mast (Slight Return)"	2010	Nash Edgerton	Filmed in New York City, United States.
"Alive"	2013	Charles Scott and Alex Theurer	Filmed at Bryce Canyon National Park, Utah, United States.
"DNA"	2013	Emmett Malloy	Filmed in San Fernando Valley, California, United States.
"Celebrate"	2015	Empire of the Sun	Filmed at Noryangjin Marketplace and Jongno Gwangjang Marketplace, Seoul, South Korea.
"High and Low"	2016	Empire of the Sun	
"Way to Go"	2017	Ryo Kitabatake	
"On Our Way Home"	2017	Fabien Teichner	
"Changes"	2024	Michael Maxxis	Filmed in Ayutthaya, Thailand.
"Music on the Radio"	2024	Michael Maxxis	Filmed in Bangkok, Thailand.
"Cherry Blossom"	2024	Michael Maxxis, Luke Steele	Filmed in Pran Buri district, Thailand.

== Awards and nominations ==
In the UK, they gained fourth position on the BBC News website's Sound of 2009 poll.

=== ARIA Awards ===
The ARIA Music Awards of 2009 nominations were announced on 8 October 2009. Empire of the Sun received the most nominations of any artist, with a total of eleven. The winners were announced on 26 November 2009 with Empire of the Sun winning in seven categories.

The nominations for the ARIA Music Awards of 2010 were announced on 28 September 2010 and the winners were announced on 7 November 2010. The final nominees for the ARIA Music Awards of 2013 were announced on 14 October, as well as the nominees and winners for the Fine Arts Awards and Artisan Awards.

Year	Nominee / work	Award	Result
2009	Walking on a Dream	Album of the Year	Won
2009	Walking on a Dream	Highest Selling Album	Nominated
2009	"Walking on a Dream"	Single of the Year	Won
2009	"Walking on a Dream"	Highest Selling Single	Nominated
2009	"Walking on a Dream" (directed by Josh Logue of Mathematics)	Best Video	Won
2009	"We Are the People"	Best Video	Nominated
2009	Empire of the Sun	Best Group	Won
2009	Empire of the Sun	Best Pop Release	Won
2009	Empire of the Sun and Donnie Sloan with Peter Mayes	Producer of the Year	Won
2009	Aaron Hayward and David Homer from Debaser	Best Cover Art	Won
2009	Peter Mayes	Engineer of the Year	Nominated
2010	"Half Mast"	Best Pop Release	Nominated
2010	Accidents Happen soundtrack – Luke Steele, Empire of the Sun and The Middle East	Best Original Soundtrack/Cast/Show Album (Fine Arts Award)	Nominated
2013	Empire of the Sun – Ice on the Dune	Best Group	Nominated
2013	Empire of the Sun – Ice on the Dune	Best Pop Release	Nominated
2013	Aaron Hayward and David Homer (Debaser)	Best Cover Art	Won
2013	Peter Mayes	Engineer of the Year	Nominated
2013	Luke Steele, Nick Littlemore, Peter Mayes and Jonathan Sloan	Producer of the Year	Nominated
2023	Tourism WA: Walking On a Dream (The Brand Agency)	Best Use of an Australian Recording in an Advertisement (duration of 2 minutes or less)	Nominated
2024	Luke Steele, Nick Littlemore and Peter Mayes – Ask That God	Best Engineered Release	Nominated
2024	Luke Steele, Nick Littlemore and Peter Mayes – Ask That God	Best Produced Release	Nominated
2026	Empire of the Sun, West Australian Symphony Orchestra and Billy-Jo Shoveller – Tourism WA: "Walking on a Dream" (The Brand Agency)	Best Use of an Australian Recording in an Advertisement	Nominated

=== APRA Awards ===
The APRA Awards are presented annually from 1982 by the Australasian Performing Right Association (APRA).

Year	Nominee / work	Award	Result
2010	"We Are the People"	Song of the Year	Nominated
2010	Luke Steele, Jonathan Sloan, Nick Littlemore – Empire of the Sun	Breakthrough Songwriter of the Year	Won
2010	"Walking on a Dream"	Dance Work of the Year	Won
2014	"Alive"	Song of the Year	Shortlisted
2014	"Alive"	Dance Work of the Year	Nominated
2025	"AEIOU" (with PNAU)	Most Performed Dance/Electronic Work	Nominated
2025	"Changes"	Most Performed Dance/Electronic Work	Nominated

=== International Dance Music Awards ===
Year	Nominee / work	Award	Result
2010	Themselves	Best Breakthrough Artist (Group)	Nominated
2010	"We Are The People"	Best Alternative/Rock Dance Track	Nominated
2014	"Alive"	Best Alternative/Rock Dance Track	Nominated

=== MTV Europe Music Awards ===
The MTV Europe Music Awards is an award presented by Viacom International Media Networks to honour artists and music in pop culture. They commenced in 2013.

Year	Nominee / work	Award	Result
2013	Themselves	Best Australian Act	Nominated

=== Q Awards ===
Year	Nominee / work	Award	Result
2009	Themselves	Best New Act	Nominated

=== Rolling Stone Australia Awards ===
The Rolling Stone Australia Awards are awarded annually in January or February by the Australian edition of Rolling Stone magazine for outstanding contributions to popular culture in the previous year.

Year	Nominee / work	Award	Result	Ref.
2025	"Changes"	Best Single	Shortlisted	
2025	Empire of the Sun	Best Live Act	Shortlisted	
2025	Empire of the Sun	Rolling Stone Global Award	Shortlisted	

=== Teen Choice Awards ===
Year	Nominee / work	Award	Result	Ref.
2016	"Walking on a Dream"	Choice Music: Rock Song	Nominated	

=== World Music Awards ===
Year	Nominee / work	Award	Result
2010	Themselves	World's Best Selling Australian Artist	Won
2014	Themselves	World's Best Group	Nominated
2014	Themselves	World's Best Live Act	Nominated
2014	Ice on the Dune	World's Best Album	Nominated
2014	"Alive"	World's Best Song	Nominated
2014	"Alive"	World's Best Video	Nominated
2014	"We are The People"	World's Best Video	Nominated
2014	"We are The People"	World's Best Song	Nominated

== Live performance band members ==
- Luke Steele – lead vocals, guitars, keyboards (2008–present), bass (2008–2015)
- Nick Littlemore – tour management (2008–present), keyboards, backing vocals (2008–2009)
- Ken Jennings – keyboards (2009–present)
- Ian Ball – guitar (2015–present)
- Olly Peacock – drums (2015–present)
- Alex Berry – bass (2015–present)
- Nicholas Semrad – keyboards (2024–present)
- Lulani Rawson – dancer (2024–present)
- Charlotte Bannell – dancer (2024–present)
- Tony Mitolo – drums (2008–2015)
- Surahn Sidhu – guitar, bass, backing vocals (2008–2015)
