= Luke Steele (musician) =

Australian singer-songwriter (born 1979)

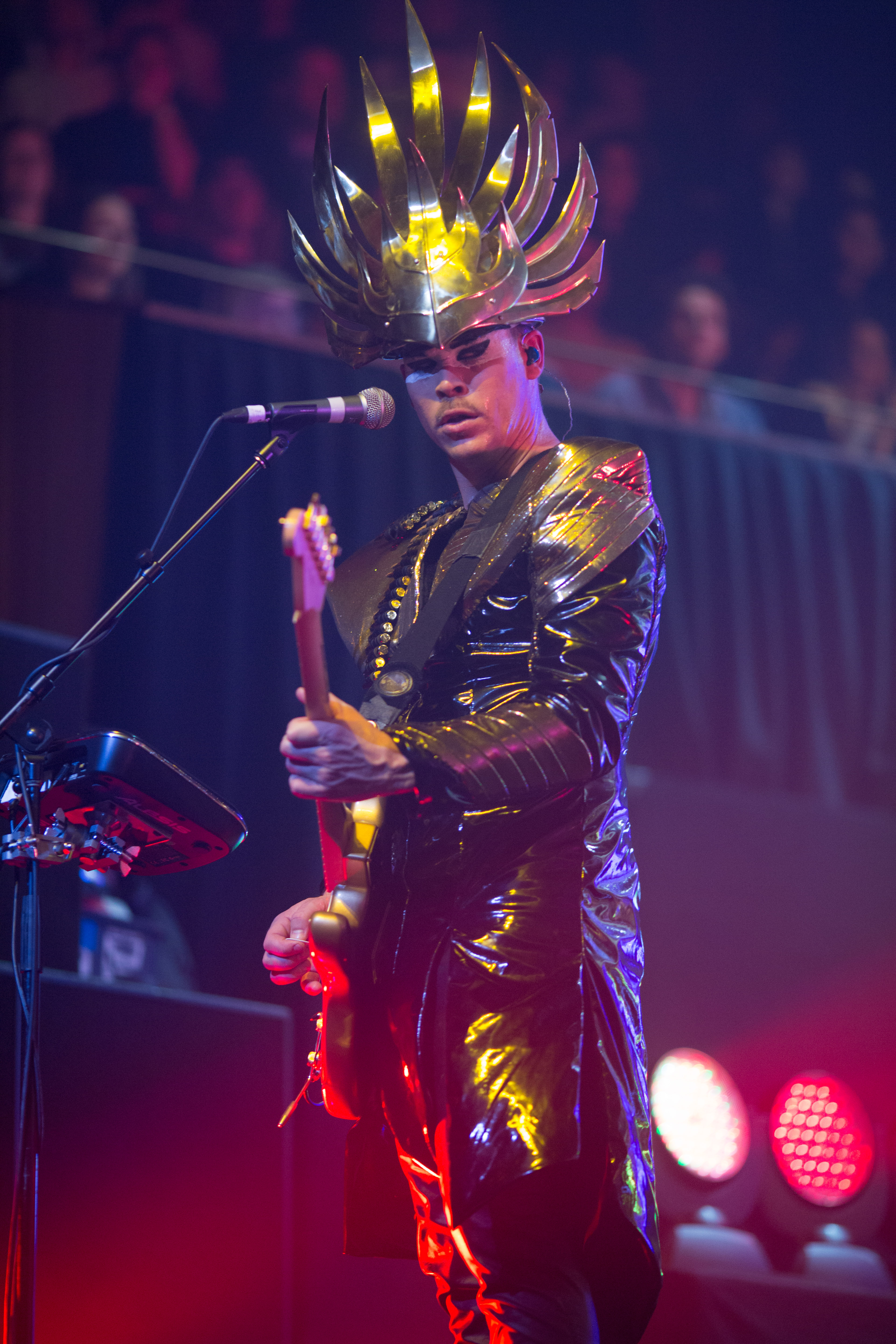
- Steele performing with Empire of the Sun in 2013

Background information
- Born: Luke James Steele; 13 December 1979 (age 46); Auckland, New Zealand
- Genres: Electronic; pop
- Occupations: Musician; singer; songwriter
- Instruments: Vocals; guitar; piano; synthesizer; bass
- Years active: 1998–present
- Labels: Capitol; Virgin; Astralwerks; EMI; Universal
- Member of: Empire of the Sun

Luke James Steele (born 13 December 1979) is a New Zealand–born Australian musician, singer and songwriter. Steele is the vocalist and primary songwriter of the alternative rock band the Sleepy Jackson and is a member of the electronic music duo Empire of the Sun.

== Early life ==
Steele was born in Auckland, New Zealand, on 13 December 1979. His family then moved to Perth, Western Australia. Luke attended Yokine Primary School and Mount Lawley Senior High School.

== Personal life ==
Steele is a member of a musical family. His father, Rick, was a blues guitarist and harmonica player. Steele's sister, Katy, was the vocalist of Perth indie rock band Little Birdy. Steele's younger brother Jake performs under the moniker Tobacco Rat. Steele's other brother Jesse was an original member of the Sleepy Jackson.

In 2006, Steele became engaged to a magazine editor, Jodi who also joined the Sleepy Jackson for the band's 2008 national tour. In October 2008, the couple had their first child, a daughter. In 2014, the couple welcomed a son.

== Music career ==
=== 1998–2007: The Sleepy Jackson ===
The Sleepy Jackson were established in 1998, featuring Steele on vocals and guitar, his brother Jesse on drums and Matthew O'Connor on bass. Both their self-titled debut EP and a subsequent single, "Miniskirt," were independently released. Jesse left the band in 2000 and was replaced by Paul Keenan.

In late 2000, the Sleepy Jackson began a national tour with Jebediah. In March 2001, on the eve of the band's deal with EMI Records, the band toured with Magic Dirt and Motor Ace, adding Ronan Charles on keyboard. Steele eventually completed the tour as a solo performer after the other band members left the tour and returned home.

In 2001, EMI released Caffeine in the Morning Sun, which Steele recorded in Sydney with session musicians. In addition to playing solo shows, Steele recruited Malcolm Clark (drums), Justin Burford (guitar) and Rodney Aravena (bass). The Sleepy Jackson relocated to Sydney, where they recorded another EP, Let Your Love Be Love (2002). Songs from this EP, and Caffeine in the Morning Sun, were compiled into a self-titled mini-album for release in the UK market in February 2003. The band toured extensively in 2003, playing in Australia, the United States and Europe. Between live appearances, the band worked on recordings for their debut album Lovers. By the end of 2003, Burford and Aravena left the band.

The band released its second album Personality – One Was a Spider, One Was a Bird in Australia on 1 July 2006. It debuted at Number 10 on the ARIA Albums Charts the following week. The album was nominated for a J Award by Australian radio station Triple J. Joining Steele and Clark on this album were Dave Symes and Felix Bloxsom, as well as Lee Jones (formerly in the Perth band Spencer Tracy). Bloxsom has since been replaced by Luke's brother Jake and wife Jodi, a.k.a. "Snappy Dolphin."

In 2007, the Sleepy Jackson performed at the 2007 Big Day Out, the Southbound festival, the Falls Festival and the St. Jerome's Laneway festival in Melbourne, Sydney and Brisbane. Also in 2007, Luke provided slide guitar on the song "Waiting All Day" by Silverchair on their fifth album Young Modern. Luke also appeared on the Pnau single "With You Forever", leading Nick Littlemore to state on Pnau's website "... working with Luke Steele ... it was amazing; that inspired [me] to work on a separate project with him all together. It's another album we're doing." Steele and Littlemore subsequently formed the electroacoustic pop outfit Empire of the Sun in 2008.

=== 2007–present: Empire of the Sun ===
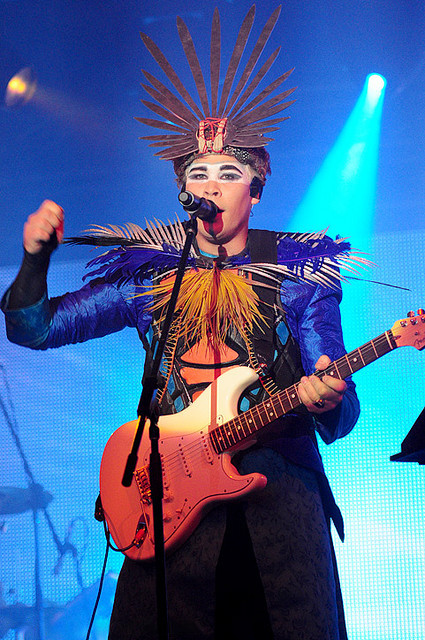
Steele performing with Empire of the Sun in Wellington (2008).

Steele and Littlemore met in 2000 when introduced by Steele's A&R executive Simon Moor, in a bar in Sydney. At the time, both were signed with EMI and had been working on independent projects. The two became instant friends and shortly afterwards decided to begin a collaborative music project together. Their first collaboration was "Tell the Girls That I'm Not Hangin' Out", which appeared on the Sleepy Jackson's 2003 debut album, Lovers. The pair only decided to get serious about making an album in 2004 when Steele went to Littlemore's studio north of Sydney and they began writing material together.

Steele was living in Perth and Littlemore in Sydney. For the next few months, the pair continued to write songs for the project independently and organised meetings in Sydney to decide on the album's overall musical direction and style. After several months of consulting on material, Littlemore and Steele went into the studio to record their debut album. Titled Walking on a Dream, the album was released on 4 October 2008. Prior to its release, six tracks were put up on the social networking site MySpace for fans to listen to.

The album opened at number eight on the ARIA Chart and peaked at number six. Their first single, titled "Walking on a Dream", was released digitally on 30 August 2008. The single received airplay from many Australian radio stations and reached No. 10 on the ARIA Singles Chart, breaking the record for the longest time taken for a single to reach the top 10. It was released as a free single on 21 April 2009. The second single released off the album, entitled "We Are the People", peaked at number twenty-four on the ARIA Charts. In September 2009, the song was used in an American advertising campaign for Vizio televisions. The third single, "Standing on the Shore" was released on iTunes on 12 June and then for general release on 23 June. Its music video was filmed in Lancelin in April 2009. Following the making of this video, it was announced that "Without You" would be the 4th single for Empire of the Sun. Remixed for single release, its music video was filmed in FOX Studios in Sydney, Australia. Its changed tempo and emotion earned it an overall positive response. It was released in late September.

Critical response to the album was mixed, generating a score of 60 on the review aggregator Metacritic. In his review for NME, Martin Robinson described their debut as "silly but their songs demand to be taken seriously, just like Prince, Ultravox and Bowie. And yes, they're like MGMT – in that they're great." Under the Radar also rated it favorably, describing it as "a highly visual experience".

However, some critics were less satisfied with the pair's debut. Dorian Lynskey of The Guardian rated it 3 out of 5 stars, applauding the duo's unpredictability, but wishing "they would calm down a bit". Popmatters were also underwhelmed by the album, stating: "Unfortunately, despite the well developed '80s image, the music emulated is not anything worth reviving."

The duo released their second album Ice on the Dune on 17 June 2013. The album's release was preceded by a trailer directed by JD Dillard of Kelvin Optical, Inc. (a division of Jeffrey Abrams's Bad Robot). Lead single "Alive" was released on 16 April 2013.

Steele received global media attention following an interview with music publication NME at the Sziget Festival in Budapest, in August 2013. During the interview, he compared Ice on the Dune to Daft Punk's 2013 Random Access Memories, saying: "They had a great marketing campaign, but we’ve got better songs." Steele was featured on Japanese-American Steve Aoki's album Neon Future I on the song "Neon Future".

In October 2014, Empire of the Sun headlined Sandance at Dubai's Atlantis the Palm and in fall 2015 undertook a brief world tour.

In July 2024, Empire of the Sun released their fourth studio album, Ask That God, along with singles "Changes", "Music On The Radio", and "Cherry Blossom". The album was accompanied by a world tour taking in North and South America, Europe, and the United Kingdom. In January 2025, the band released Ask That God (Deluxe) with two previously unreleased tracks titled "Somebody's Son" featuring Lindsey Buckingham and "Dark Secrets".

=== 2022: Solo career and Listen to the Water ===
In February 2022, Steele announced his debut solo studio album, Listen to the Water and released its lead single, "Common Man", on 11 February 2022.

== Influences ==
Steele cites his musical influences as including Prince, John Lennon, Brian Wilson, Lindsay Buckingham, Paul McCartney, Elliott Smith, Carole King, James Taylor, and Daft Punk.

== Collaborations ==
Steele's first notable collaboration was the band Nations by the River, formed with Ohad Rein (Old Man River), Edo Kahn, and Dove Kahn (both from Gelbison) during a Gelbison/Sleepy Jackson tour in 2003. They released an album through EMI called Holes in the Valley on 7 June 2004.

The following year Steele provided vocals on a track on Paul Mac's album Panic Room. While in New York City in 2006, Steele contributed a track called "I'm Moving On" to Yoko Ono's 2007 remix album Yes, I'm a Witch. Pnau feature Steele on their track "With You Forever", from their third album Pnau, released in October 2007.

Steele and his father Rick collaborated on an album released in February 2008 entitled Through My Eyes. Steele also spent time in 2008 recording with Daniel Johns of Silverchair at Johns' home studio in Newcastle, Australia. Although no plans were made to release the recordings, it was revealed that the collaboration was named "Hathaway/Palmer". Steele described the project: "It kind of started out a White Album thing because we don't have a band, it was acoustics. And from there it kind of went a bit haywire. It's pretty pop. I guess it's quite low down; there's country songs."

In August 2008, Steele embarked on his first national solo tour and performed—in an intimate acoustic guitar mode—songs from both the Sleepy Jackson albums, as well as a selection of new songs from his other projects. Steele was also featured on "What We Talkin' About", the first track of Jay-Z's album The Blueprint 3, released on 8 September 2009.

In a 2010 interview with The Sunday Times, Steele described his plans for the future.

I've definitely got a lot of recording planned for this year [2010]. I've got about 75 sketches of songs which I think are pretty cool. I need to get more serious with recording. A Sleepies within the year and an Empire record after that. At 60, I want to look back at a solid body of work. You want to be remembered as an inspirational artist rather than someone who pumps out pop things to get on the next magazine cover.

Steele co-wrote and co-produced the track "Rather Die Young" on American R&B singer Beyoncé Knowles's 2011 album 4. He also appears on Usher's song "Looking 4 Myself", from the 2012 album of the same name. His vocals are featured on the Steve Aoki song "Neon Future" from Neon Future I as well, which was uploaded to the latter's SoundCloud profile on 2 October 2014.

Steele teamed up with Daniel Johns of Silverchair to form the band Dreams, releasing the single "No One Defeats Us" on 16 March 2018. The duo released their debut album No One Defeats Us on 14 September 2018.

Steele was a guest vocalist on Kyle Crane's 2019 release Crane Like the Bird.

== Discography ==
=== Albums ===
Title	Details	Peak chart positions
Title	Details	AUS
Listen to the Water	Released: 13 May 2022; Label: EMI Music Australia (4554545); Format: CD, LP, streaming, digital download	46

=== Singles ===
List of singles, with selected chart positions
Title	Year	Album
"Neon Future" (with Steve Aoki)	2015	non album single
"When We Were Young" (with M-Phazes)	2018	
"Common Man"	2022	Listen to the Water
"Running, Running"	2022	Listen to the Water

== Awards and nominations ==
=== APRA Awards ===
The APRA Awards are presented annually from 1982 by the Australasian Performing Right Association (APRA).

Year	Nominee / work	Award	Result
2010	"We Are the People"	Song of the Year	Nominated
2010	Luke Steele, Jonathon Sloan, Nick Littlemore – Empire of the Sun	Breakthrough Songwriter of the Year	Won
2010	"Walking on a Dream"	Dance Work of the Year	Won
2014	"Alive"	Song of the Year	Shortlisted
2014	"Alive"	Dance Work of the Year	Nominated
2025	"AEIOU" (with PNAU and Empire of the Sun)	Most Performed Dance/Electronic Work	Nominated
2025	"Changes"	Most Performed Dance/Electronic Work	Nominated

=== ARIA Music Awards ===
The ARIA Music Awards is an annual awards ceremony that recognises excellence, innovation, and achievement across all genres of Australian music. They commenced in 1987.

Year	Nominee / work	Award	Result	Ref.
2024	Luke Steele, Nick Littlemore and Peter Mayes – Ask That God	Best Engineered Release	Nominated	
2024	Luke Steele, Nick Littlemore and Peter Mayes – Ask That God	Best Produced Release	Nominated	
