= Peter Mayes =

Australian musician and producer (born 1976)

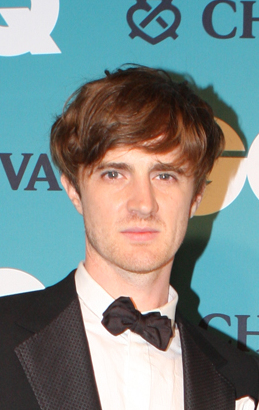
- Mayes at the GQ Men Of The Year Awards in 2012

Background information
- Born: October 5, 1976 (age 48)
- Genres: Alternative rock, electronic
- Occupation: Musician
- Instrument(s): Guitars, vocals, bass guitar, synthesiser, keyboard, melodica, keytar
- Years active: 1999–present
- Labels: EMI, etcetc Lab78
- Spouse: Rachel Zeilic (m. 2023)

Peter Mayes (born 5 October 1976) is an Australian musician and producer. He is widely known for being a leading member of dance act Pnau. He is a longtime collaborator with Nick Littlemore and has produced and mixed many of his projects, most notably the platinum-selling album Walking on a Dream and Ice on the Dune for Empire of the Sun, and the art-rock act Teenager. At the ARIA Music Awards of 2009 he won Producer of the Year. He has also done work with Elton John, Mika, Karen O, Ellie Goulding, Sia, ESG, Electric Youth and Lindsey Buckingham. In 2019 he and Nick Littlemore launched the label Lab78.
