= Nick Littlemore =

Australian musician (born 1978)

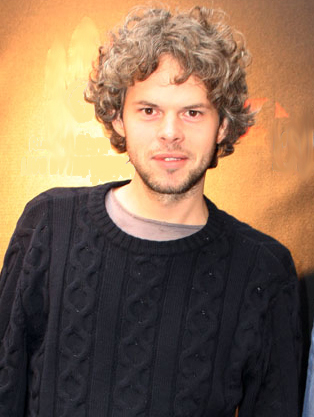
- Littlemore in 2011
- Born: Nicholas George Littlemore; 6 May 1978 (age 48); Sydney, New South Wales, Australia
- Years active: 1993–present
- Spouse: Gigi Rose Gray (m. 2014)
- Children: 1
- Relatives: James Littlemore (brother); Sam Littlemore (brother)
- Musical career
- Genres: Alternative rock; electronica
- Occupations: Musician; record producer; singer; songwriter
- Instruments: Vocals; keyboards; drums
- Labels: EMI; etcetc; UMG
- Member of: Pnau; Empire of the Sun; Vlossom; Teenager

Nicholas George Littlemore (born 6 May 1978) is an Australian musician, record producer, singer, songwriter and tour manager. As a musician, he is the frontman of the electronic project Pnau, a member of the art-rock band Teenager and one part of the electro pop-duo Empire of the Sun. As a record producer, he has worked with Elton John, Lover Lover, Groove Armada and Mika. From late 2009, Littlemore had worked with the Cirque Du Soleil as a composer and musical director for the touring arena show Zarkana, which debuted on 29 June 2011. His older brother Sam La More is also a musician and record producer. In 2019, he and Peter Mayes launched the label Lab78.

== Biography ==
Littlemore was born on 6 May 1978 in Sydney and was raised in Wahroonga with his older brothers, James (later a music video director) and Sam Littlemore (born February 1975, later a musician and producer). In 2011 Littlemore recalled, "[m]y parents didn't push us but led us towards creative endeavours. Early on, my brothers and I were naturally interested in that. In school holidays we were doing pottery classes or life drawing. I wasn't very sporty". Their cousin, Xanthe Littlemore, is a singer-songwriter and has toured with Paul Kelly. When Littlemore was 10 years old, he met future bandmate Peter Mayes and the pair were making music together at the age of 13 or 14. Littlemore attended Barker College in Hornsby and finished secondary education in 1996. He attended the College of Fine Arts at the University of New South Wales studying film, sound and performance. Littlemore and Mayes formed Pnau in the mid-1990s, initially as an acid house and trance band, while still at secondary school. The group have issued four studio albums, Sambanova (July 1999), Again (October 2003), Pnau (January 2007) and Soft Universe (July 2011). Sambanova, Pnau and Soft Universe have each peaked into the ARIA Albums Chart Top 40.

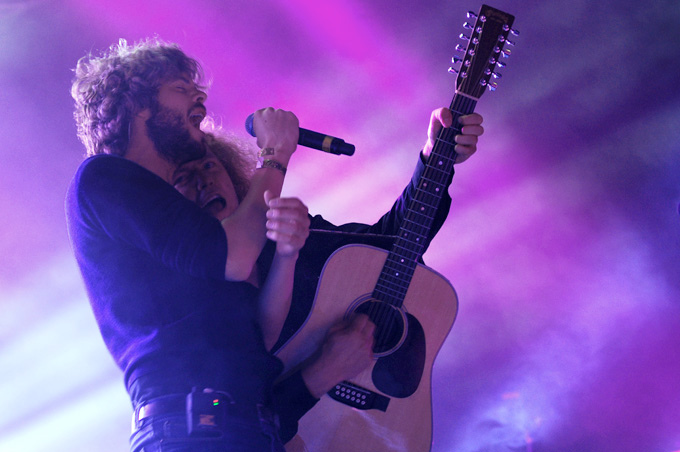
Pnau – Nick Littlemore at left, Peter Mayes at right – performing at Sir Stewart Bovell Park, Busselton, in January 2012.

While still a member of Pnau, Littlemore has also been involved in side-projects. In 2001 he joined his brother Sam in the group L'More and issued a single, "Takin' Hold". Sam subsequently performed as Sam La More, in April 2003 "Takin' Hold" was released in the United Kingdom. In 2004 Littlemore formed Teenager as an art rock band in Sydney and asked Pip Brown (aka Ladyhawke) to join on guitar. Brown had relocated to Australia after the disbandment of her New Zealand hard rock group, Two Lane Blacktop. Teenager issued Thirteen and the related single "Bound and Gagged" in 2006. Littlemore's brother James directed the music video for "Bound and Gagged". Mess + Noise's Craig Mathieson described the album as "a pop record, albeit a particularly exotic species that equally suggests creative guile and hints of self-indulgence ... 'Pony' is the closest the album comes to cheap genre holidaying, approximating rock attitude when the organic and desperate growth of 'Bound And Gagged' is so much more impressive". Soon after the album's appearance Brown left to concentrate on her solo career (i.e. Ladyhawke) and she later credited Littlemore:

I was quite happy playing guitar [in Teenager], contributing my ideas and stepping back [...] [Littlemore] heard me singing a song, and rushed in and said, "What's that?" I was like, "It's just like, you know..." [...] Nick was like, "That's cool, you should really follow that up. You just need to get in a studio and record it". So we jumped in the car, and he drove me out to his parents' house, and we recorded that song ... that was the start for me, where he helped me get the confidence.

In 2000, Littlemore met Luke Steele of alternate rockers The Sleepy Jackson, the pair subsequently collaborated on songwriting and performing. The Sleepy Jackson's recorded "Tell the Girls That I'm Not Hangin' Out" for their debut album, Lovers (2003). It had been co-written by Littlemore, Steele and The Sleepy Jackson's Malcolm Clark. The Sleepy Jackson and Pnau both performed "Modern Way", which was written by Littlemore, Mayes and Steele. In 2007 Pnau issued their self-titled album with Steele supplying lead vocals, and co-writing with Littlemore and Mayes, on "Freedom" and "With You Forever". Ladyhawke supplied lead vocals on "Embrace" which was co-written by Brown, Littlemore, Mayes and La More.

While working together on Pnau, Littlemore and Steele started writing tracks for a side project, initially called Steelemore, which became the electro pop group Empire of the Sun. Littlemore was living in Sydney and Steele, then in Perth, however the pair corresponded and continued composing together. Periodically during 2007, Steele would fly to Sydney where tracks were recorded for Empire of the Sun's debut album, Walking on a Dream. Mayes assisted with recording and mixing.

To promote Pnau internationally, Littlemore and Mayes travelled to London. In December 2007 Elton John heard Pnau's "Wild Strawberries" – the lead single from the album – while in Sydney for the Australian leg of his Rocket Man Tour. After hearing the whole album John contacted Littlemore to encourage him. Pnau returned to Australia in January 2008 to perform at Big Day Out and met John who signed the duo with his United Kingdom-based management. Pnau then relocated to London more permanently, both Littlemore and Mayes worked with John. Littlemore and Mayes established a recording studio in London and worked as record producers.

In August 2008, Empire of the Sun issued their debut single, "Walking on a Dream", which peaked at No. 10 on the ARIA Singles Chart. The second single, "We Are the People", followed in September with the parent album released in October. The album reached No. 6 on the ARIA Albums Chart. In February 2009, Littlemore told Linda McGee of Raidió Teilifís Éireann (RTÉ) that Empire of the Sun planned to tour in August but not as a group "this is not a band project. We're not going to stand up there with guitar, bass, drums and a keyboard player and just play our songs out in a merry Indie kind of way". He described a more theatrical presentation, "I've just finished the first draft of the script and it's going to be more of a play, for want of a better term. So at the moment we've got people working in China building inflatable sets and all kinds of things and we're working with some theatre directors in London". However, from April to September that year, Steele could not contact Littlemore. From September Empire of the Sun, without Littlemore, performed live tours of Australia.

Littlemore's bands have won eight ARIA Music Awards, with one in 2000 for 'Best Dance Release' for Pnau's Sambanova, and seven in 2009 for Empire of the Sun's album Walking on a Dream and the title song. Empire of the Sun – without Littlemore – performed "Walking on a Dream" at the ceremony with Steele collecting the awards on the band's behalf, he quipped "German Shepherd [sic] Steele gets another award ... Everybody say hi to invisible Nick!". Ladyhawke also won two awards for her solo work.

Since 2009 Littlemore has received medication to treat arthritis. From late 2009 Littlemore worked in Montreal, Canada with the Cirque Du Soleil as a composer and musical director for the touring arena show, Zarkana, which debuted on 29 June 2011 in New York. Pnau's fourth album, Soft Universe, was recorded in London. Upon its release Mayes confirmed Littlemore and Steele were working on a second Empire of the Sun album. Littlemore expanded, "We just started writing two or three weeks ago in New York ... Luke and I got into a studio, which was run by blind people – it was great. It's good to be in weird places with Luke, we enjoy that. He has an extraordinary mind – it's sounding so good". As from July 2011, when not touring or performing, he lives in LA. During late 2011 Pnau toured through Australia promoting their album. In 2025, Teenager reformed to release the single "A.A."

== Discography ==
With Pnau

with Teenager

With Empire of the Sun

With L'More

- "Takin' Hold" (2001)

As Vlossom (with Alister Wright from Cloud Control)

=== Extended plays ===
List of extended plays, with release date and label shown
Title	Details
My Friend (with Alistair Wright as Vlossom)	Released: 3 April 2020; Label: Lab78, Etcetc Music; Formats: Digital download, streaming
Somethin' Bout Dancing	Released: 5 December 2024; Label: Etcetc Music; Formats: Digital download, streaming

=== Singles ===
==== As lead artist ====
List of singles, with year released and album shown
Title	Year	Album
"Catch Your Breath"	2019	My Friend
"Tabs"	2020	My Friend
"My Friend"	2020	My Friend
"Gotta Prepare for This"	2020	My Friend
"Lucky" (with Pnau)	2020	Non-album single
"Fast Car" (Triple J Like a Version)	2020	Non-album single
"Good Karma Lover"	2020	Non-album single
"Open Your Mind"	2022	Non-album single
"Take Another Minute"	2022	Non-album single
"Burn3r"	2024	Somethin' 'Bout Dancing
"I'll Be There"	2024	Somethin' 'Bout Dancing
"In Good Thyme"	2024	Somethin' 'Bout Dancing

=== Production work ===
Nick Littlemore is credited with the following work for other artists:

- David Bridie – Hotel Radio (18 February 2003) producer, loops, noise, programming
- Robbie Williams – Greatest Hits (18 October 2004) programming
- Van She – Van She (27 November 2005) producer, composer
- Darren Emerson – "Bouncer" (2005), "Hard 4 Slow" (2007), Au Go Go (EP, 8 August 2011) co-producer, co-writer
- Lost Valentinos – Damn & Damn Again (2006) co-producer
- Mercy Arms – Kept Low (EP, 2006) co-producer
- Groove Armada – Black Light (2010) vocals, composer
- Groove Armada – White Light (18 October 2010) vocals, composer
- WZRD – WZRD (28 February 2012) sound design
- Mika – The Origin of Love (16 September 2012) songwriting credits, production, and Hyperlove (23 January 2026) songwriting credits, production

== Awards and nominations ==
=== APRA Awards ===
The APRA Awards are presented annually from 1982 by the Australasian Performing Right Association (APRA).

Year	Nominee / work	Award	Result
2010	"We Are the People"	Song of the Year	Nominated
2010	Luke Steele, Jonathon Sloan, Nick Littlemore – Empire of the Sun	Breakthrough Songwriter of the Year	Won
2010	"Walking on a Dream"	Dance Work of the Year	Won
2014	"Alive"	Song of the Year	Shortlisted
2014	"Alive"	Dance Work of the Year	Nominated
2025	"AEIOU" (with PNAU and Empire of the Sun)	Most Performed Dance/Electronic Work	Nominated
2025	"Changes"	Most Performed Dance/Electronic Work	Nominated

=== ARIA Music Awards ===
The ARIA Music Awards is an annual awards ceremony that recognises excellence, innovation, and achievement across all genres of Australian music. They commenced in 1987.

Year	Nominee / work	Award	Result	Ref.
2020	Imogen Grist & Nick Littlemore for Pnau featuring Vlossom – "Lucky"	Best Video	Nominated	
2024	Luke Steele, Nick Littlemore and Peter Mayes – Ask That God	Best Engineered Release	Nominated	
2024	Luke Steele, Nick Littlemore and Peter Mayes – Ask That God	Best Produced Release	Nominated	

== Personal life ==
Littlemore married his wife, illustrator and fine artist Gigi Rose Gray, in 2014.
