= Out West (album) =

Out West (Live at the Fillmore)

Live album by Gomez
- Released: 7 June 2005 (US); 25 July 2005 (UK)
- Recorded: January 20–22, 2005
- Venue: The Fillmore, San Francisco
- Genre: Rock
- Label: ATO / Sony BMG (US); Independiente (UK)

Gomez chronology
Split the Difference (2004)	Out West (Live at the Fillmore) (2005)	How We Operate (2006)

Professional ratings
Aggregate scores
Source	Rating
Metacritic	64/100 link
Review scores
Source	Rating
Allmusic	link
PopMatters	link
Rolling Stone	link

Out West (Live at the Fillmore) is a live double album released by Gomez in June 2005 and the first album the band released for ATO Records. It features material mostly from their first two albums, Bring It On and Liquid Skin, with a few tracks each from In Our Gun and Split the Difference, and one from the Machismo E.P.. There are also a few cover songs, such as "Going Out West" by Tom Waits and "Black Eyed Dog" by Nick Drake (which is combined with "Free to Run" in an extended song).

The front album cover is a psychedelic manipulation of a photograph of a traditional Mexican band, possibly inspired by the Fillmore's tradition of using psychedelic posters to promote events. The back album cover shows a photo of the actual band Gomez using similar coloration to the front.

== Track listing ==
All songs written by Gomez except where indicated.

=== Disc one ===
1. "Get Miles"
2. "Shot Shot"
3. "Hangover"
4. "Going Out West" (Tom Waits)
5. "Here Comes the Breeze"
6. "We Haven't Turned Around"
7. "Fill My Cup"
8. "Do One" (Dajon Everett, Gomez)
9. "Revolutionary Kind"

=== Disc two ===
1. "Bring It On"
2. "Nothing Is Wrong"
3. "Love Is Better Than a Warm Trombone"
4. "Do's and Don'ts"
5. "Black Eyed Dog" (Nick Drake) / "Free to Run"
6. "Ping One Down"
7. "Blue Moon Rising"
8. "Get Myself Arrested"
9. "These 3 Sins"
10. "Make No Sound"
11. "Whippin' Piccadilly"

=== DVD ===
The UK edition of the album, released on Independiente, comes with a bonus DVD.

1. Intro
2. "Get Miles"
3. "Whippin' Piccadilly"
4. "Black Eyed Dog"
5. "78 Stone Wobble" / "Fade Away" (Charles Hardin)
6. Outro & Credits

== Personnel ==
Gomez

- Ian Ball
- Ben Ottewell
- Olly Peacock
- Paul Blackburn
- Tom Gray

with:

- Dajon Everett - keyboards, percussion, electronics

Technical

- Bill Walker, Frank Rinaldi - recording
