= House M.D. (soundtrack) =

House M.D. Original Television Soundtrack

Soundtrack album by Various Artists
- Released: September 18, 2007
- Genre: Soundtrack
- Label: Nettwerk

House M.D. Original Television Soundtrack is a soundtrack album from the television series House. It was released on September 18, 2007, by Nettwerk Records. The soundtrack includes full length versions of songs featured in the show, such as "See the World" by Gomez, "Walter Reed" by Michael Penn, and "Teardrop", the show's opening theme, performed by Massive Attack. It also featured songs that were recorded especially for the series that were not previously released, such as a cover of the Christina Aguilera song "Beautiful" by Elvis Costello, and covers of The Rolling Stones' "You Can't Always Get What You Want" and Cab Calloway's "Minnie The Moocher" by Band From TV.

== Track listing ==
The episode the song is featured in is listed in parentheses following the title and artist

1. "Teardrop" by Massive Attack* (song without vocals played in U.S. opening sequence)
2. "See the World" by Gomez ("Half-Wit")
3. "Walter Reed" by Michael Penn ("Fools for Love")
4. "Beautiful" by Elvis Costello** ("Autopsy")
5. "Dear God" by Sarah McLachlan**
6. "Feelin' Alright" by Joe Cocker ("Detox")
7. "Waiting on an Angel" by Ben Harper ("Lines in the Sand")
8. "Got To Be More Careful" by Jon Cleary & the Absolute Monster Gentlemen ("Heavy")
9. "God, Please Let Me Go Back" by Josh Rouse
10. "Are You Alright?" by Lucinda Williams ("Fetal Position")
11. "Good Man" by Josh Ritter ("Human Error")
12. "You Can't Always Get What You Want" by Band From TV
13. "Minnie the Moocher" by Band From TV***

* North America only.
** previously unreleased in the US
*** iTunes exclusive

== Development ==
The House, MD official television soundtrack was released on September 18, 2007, by Nettwerk Records. The CD includes two performances by Band from TV, a band formed by actor Greg Grunberg, that features television actors singing and playing instruments for charity. Hugh Laurie, the lead actor of House, is part of this band. The band was contacted by NBC in 2007 about performing on the soundtrack, to which they happily agreed.

== Reception ==
Chad Grischow of IGN called the soundtrack "a decent collection of too much music you probably already have on your iPod", and stated that "You will be much happier if you pick apart the pieces you are missing and grab a few songs rather than the whole album". Grischow graded the soundtrack with a 6.9 on a ten scale.
