= Detroit Swing 66/Ping One Down =

EP by Gomez
- Released: 1 July 2002
- Label: Hut (Virgin)

Gomez chronology
In Our Gun (2000)	Detroit Swing 66/Ping One Down (2002)	Split the Difference (2004)

Detroit Swing 66/Ping One Down is a seven-track EP by British rock band Gomez, released in 2002 on Hut/Virgin Records in Australia. Both Detroit Swing 66 and Ping One Down had been featured on the album In Our Gun. Detroit Swing 66 was played to radio in Australia only. However, Ping One Down had a video made and was released as another double A side single in the UK, together with Sound of Sounds. Consequently, Sound of Sounds never aired in Australia. The EP’s B-sides are mostly from the UK Gomez single Shot Shot, apart from Click Click, which had been featured on the UK Ping One Down/Sound of Sounds single. The five extra tracks were later that year put onto a bonus disc to be repackaged with In Our Gun.

== Track listing ==
All tracks by Gomez

1. "Detroit Swing 66" – 3:57
2. "Ping One Down" – 3:20
3. "Silhouettes" – 4:35
4. "Coltrane" – 3:23
5. "Air-hostess Song" – 5:09
6. "Pop Juice" – 4:23
7. "Click Click" – 2:19

== Personnel ==
- Ian Ball – vocals, guitar
- Ben Ottewell – vocals, guitar
- Paul Blackburn – bass
- Tom Gray – vocals, guitar, keyboards
- Olly Peacock – drums
