= Highfields School, Matlock =

Highfields School

Location
- Upper Lumsdale; Matlock, Derbyshire, DE4 5NA; England; 53°08′48″N 1°32′09″W

Information
- Type: Academy
- Motto: "Be The Best You Can"
- Established: 1982
- Local authority: Derbyshire
- Department for Education URN: 148299 Tables
- Ofsted: Reports
- Headteacher: Andrew Marsh
- Gender: Coeducational
- Age: 11 to 18
- Enrolment: 1337
- Houses: Aeris, Ignis, Terra & Aqua
- Colours: Uniform: Black & White; Sports: Blue & White
- Website: Official website

Highfields School is a coeducational secondary school and sixth form located in Matlock, Derbyshire, England. At the time of its September 2012 Ofsted inspection, the school had 1175 pupils (male and female) on roll aged 11–18, with 215 in the sixth form. It is split across two sites in the town 1.8 miles apart.

== History ==
Highfields was created in 1982 as a comprehensive school by the merger of Ernest Bailey's Grammar School and Charles White Secondary Modern School. The site of Charles White in Starkholmes became the 'lower site' of Highfields, while Bailey's was converted to Derbyshire Record Office, previously housed at the county council's headquarters. A new site was built to house the new 'upper site' at Lumsdale.

David Marshall was headmaster from the school's founding in 1982 until he was replaced by Ian Dalrymple-Alford. Today, Marshall is remembered in the name of the Lumsdale site's David Marshall Sports Hall. Dalrymple-Alford left the school in January 2006, being replaced by Dr Ramsey Tetlow.

The school was a specialist 'performing arts college' from 2005, until the specialist schools programme was ended in 2010. The school retains an emphasis on its performing arts credentials. Dr Tetlow in turn retired in 2011, being replaced by Eddie Wilkes. Due to retirement, Peter Cole & Ben Riggott became headteachers in 2016. They were then succeeded by Andrew Marsh in 2018.

The school has been criticised, amongst several other British schools, for making use of the Brain Gym 'mental exercise' programme, which claims that 'the brain is a muscle' and that a set of hand and leg movements and chest rubs can promote learning. Commonly described as pseudoscience, physician Ben Goldacre has described the programme as 'ludicrous' while Teacher of the Year award-winner Philip Beadle described it as 'moonshine...you'd probably get as much benefit from taking a Brain Gym book and booting it around the room'.

Previously a community school administered by Derbyshire County Council, in October 2021 Highfields School converted to academy status. The school is now sponsored by the East Midlands Education Trust.

== Uniform ==
The school uniform consists of a grey blazer with the school logo, plain black trousers or skirt, and a white shirt accompanied with a tie that bears the school logo. Alternately, a full-length shirt may be worn with a red tie with a school logo.

Sixth form students have no set uniform but have to stick to a dress code defined as 'smart office wear'.

The school PE kit includes navy blue shorts, royal blue knee-length socks and either a royal blue rugby shirt with a reversible white strip or royal blue polo shirt.

== Sites ==
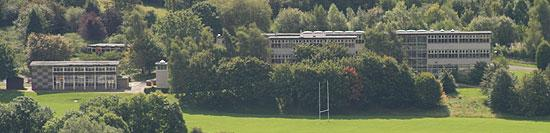
Panorama of lower site.

'Lower site' is situated at Starkholmes and is the site used by year 7 and 8 students. The building used to be the site of Charles White Secondary Modern School but was converted in 1982 (See history). The site underwent a £1.2m refurbishment in 2004.

'Upper site' is situated at Lumsdale and it is used by years 9–11 and sixth form. The site was built in 1982 especially for the new school.

== Ofsted inspections and performance ==
The school was inspected in full by Ofsted in 2006. This determined that the school was 'satisfactory... with some good features'. This contrasts to the 1999 report which said 'On balance, the school has more strengths than weaknesses'.

The history department was inspected in 2007. The subsequent report found the department to be 'outstanding' – achieving a grade 1. Furthermore, Highfields was the third best-performing school in Derbyshire at A-level in 2007 according to BBC league tables and the seventh best-performing at GCSE, higher than their normal placings in these league tables.

In a February 2009 whole-school inspection, the school found to be 'satisfactory' (grade 3) – below its 'good' (grade 2) target – but with improvements since the last inspection. It also noted the school's performance, citing that 'standards are above average'.

Following a 2011 whole-school inspection, while still classing the school's sixth form as 'good' (grade 2), the school as a whole was determined to be 'inadequate' (grade 4) and was given 'notice to improve'. Despite Ofsted's criticisms, the school recorded its best-ever A-level results in August 2012, with a 99.6% pass rate and 60% of results at grade B or above. The school also saw a 7% increase to 70% of students earning 5 A*-C grades at GCSE. Subsequently, a September 2012 follow-up inspection found the school to have improved markedly, achieving a 'good' (grade 2) for the first time in over 6 years.

== Racism study ==
Highfields took part in a study in 2004 which was reported by the Department of Education. The interest arose from the school choosing to look at diversity despite its very low ethnic mix. A theatre group presented plays that centred on racism in towns like Matlock. The study led to collaborations with dissimilar schools in Derby that were funded by an interested company.

== Student protest ==
On 24 November 2010, Highfields students staged a demonstration as part of a nationwide student protest day against the government's scrapping of the Education Maintenance Allowance and decision to raise the cap on university tuition fees. Up to 300 students walked out of classes and marched, escorted by police, first to the Local Education Authority headquarters at County Hall and then onto Matlock town centre.

== Sports Leadership Academy ==
The school's Physical Education department was presented with the Queen's Award for Voluntary Service – the equivalent to an MBE for organisations – in June 2010 by HRH Prince Edward, Duke of Kent, accompanied by Olympic badminton player Donna Kellogg, for its 'Sports Leadership Academy', co-ordinated by Jayne Allen. Sports Leaders UK later announced the school's academy was to be the first ever academy to reach 'World Leader' status for leadership and volunteering.

== Olympic torch ==
The school was visited by the Olympic torch relay in June 2012, the school forming the relay's 'lunch stop' as it traveled through Derbyshire. A commemorative stone at the school marks the occasion.

A student carried the torch later that day in Derby, whilst the academy's coordinator carried the Paralympic torch.

== Notable alumni ==
- Isy Suttie, comedian, actress, writer and musician
- Ben Ottewell, singer-songwriter of the indie-rock band Gomez, winners of the 1998 Mercury Prize
- Matt Chandler and Tom Marriott, guitarist and trombonist respectively, of the funk band Pest
- Christopher Peach, who achieved notoriety as a 15-year-old when his underage dealings on the stock market were discovered as a result of Black Monday
- Ellie Watton, retired field hockey player and winner of Olympic, European & Commonwealth medals
