= Ben Ottewell =

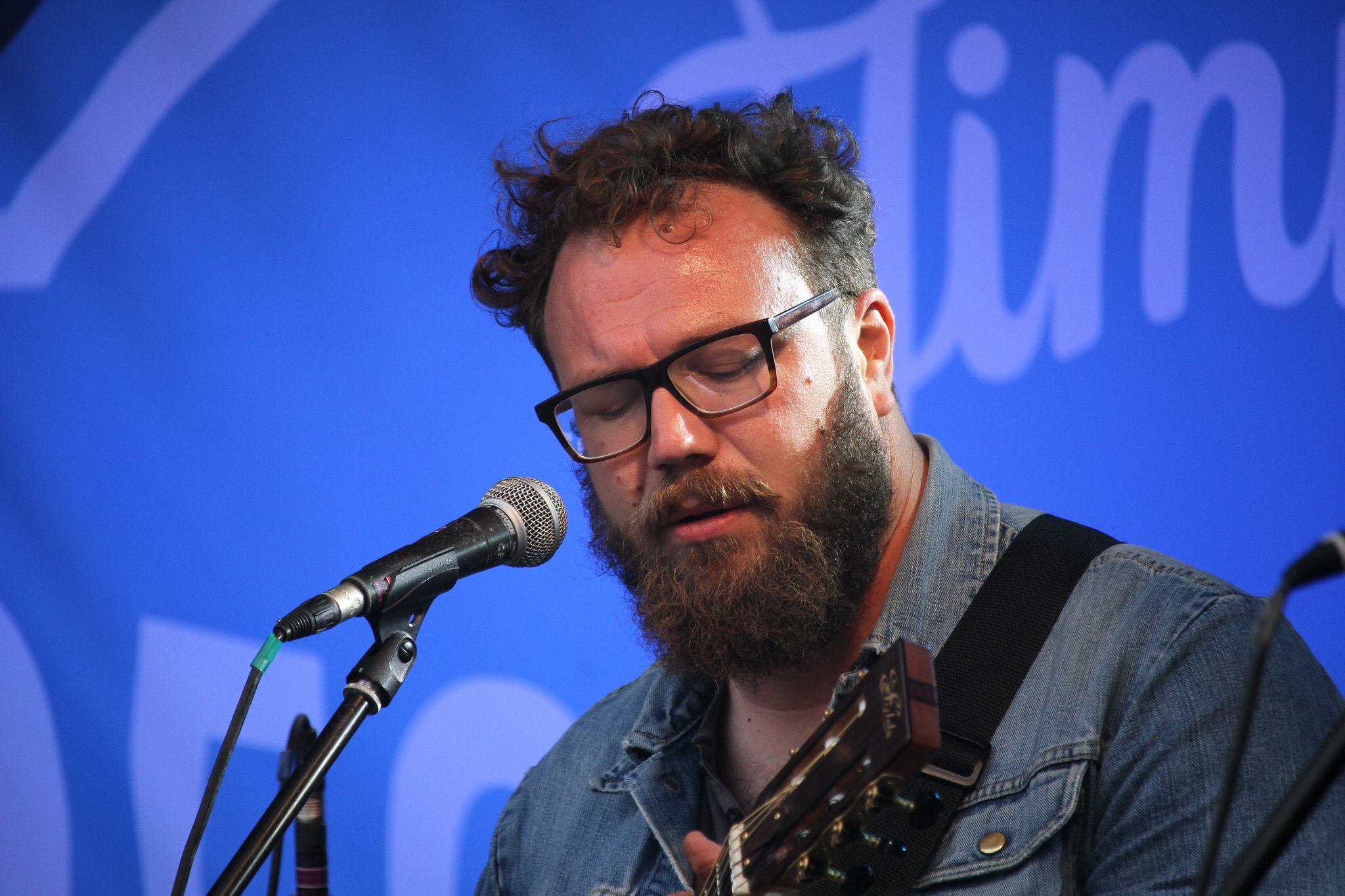
- Ottewell performing in 2019

Background information
- Born: Benjamin Joseph Ottewell; 23 June 1976 (age 50); Chesterfield, England
- Origin: Bonsall, Derbyshire
- Genres: Indie, alternative rock, folk, folk rock
- Instruments: Vocals, guitar
- Labels: ATO, MapleMusic Recordings (Canada)
- Member of: Gomez

Benjamin Joseph Ottewell (born 23 June 1976) is an English singer-songwriter. He is one of the three lead singers of the English indie rock band Gomez. The band were the recipients of the Mercury Music Award Prize in 1998, and Ben is well known for his "deep, raspy voice" and "gravelly baritone". In 2011, Ottewell embarked upon a solo project with his debut solo album Shapes & Shadows.

== Career ==
Ottewell came into contact with Ian Ball (vocals, guitar) while the two were studying at Sheffield University. Ball was impressed by Ben's big voice, and along with Tom Gray (vocals, guitar, keyboard), Paul Blackburn (bass), and Olly Peacock (drums, synths, computers), they formed the band Gomez. Ottewell's deep, soulful voice has gained him some acclaim and has drawn some comparisons to Pearl Jam's Eddie Vedder and artist Tom Waits, and his lyrical style, and acoustical arrangements, especially in his solo work, have drawn comparisons to folk singer Nick Drake.

== Shapes & Shadows ==
Ben Ottewell's first solo album, Shapes & Shadows, is not a huge departure from his material with Gomez, but it has its differences. It is more low-key, melancholy, and acoustic driven than Gomez. One music critic says "lyrically and thematically, Shapes and Shadows (the album) is a very thoughtful and mature recording, as if Ottewell is taking issues of love and relationships discussed in Gomez's back catalogue to another, more mature level".

== Rattlebag ==
In an interview with Guitar World, Ben revealed "When it came to writing for Rattlebag I started afresh and all the songs were written specifically with the album in mind over a 12-month period, perhaps making the album a little more cohesive. I'm a great believer in the power of the riff, not just in the bombastic Zeppelin sense but also the more cyclical blues or folk licks, and most of the songs are written with a riff as the foundation. Once these ideas were formed, some as just a verse, some almost full songs, I'd take them to Sam [his writing partner, Sam Genders, formerly of English folk band Tunng, now of Diagrams] and we'd finish them. The recording took 5 days in Los Angeles with producer Will Golden, the other key ingredient. We got in some great players and Clay Blair who is a fantastic engineer. It's the most fun I've had in a studio since those early Gomez records." Ben turned to his fanbase to crowdfund the album via Indiegogo.

== Personal life ==
Ottewell was born in Chesterfield and raised in nearby Bonsall, Derbyshire, attending Highfields School in Matlock. He currently resides in Brighton, East Sussex, in England. He is married, and is a father of twin boys and one girl.

== Discography ==
=== Studio albums ===
- Shapes & Shadows, 2011
- Rattlebag, 2014 © Tarka Records
- A Man Apart, 2017

=== Gomez discography ===
==== Studio albums ====
Year	Title	Peak Chart Position								Certifications (sales thresholds)
Year	Title	UK	AUS	CAN	NZ	NOR	US	US Heat	US Indie	Certifications (sales thresholds)
1998	Bring It On: Released: 13 April 1998; Label: Hut / Virgin	11	–	–	–	–	–	–	–	BPI: Platinum
1999	Liquid Skin: Released: 13 September 1999; Label: Hut / Virgin	2	9	49	40	19	–	30	–	BPI: Platinum
2002	In Our Gun: Released: 18 March 2002; Label: Hut / Virgin	8	5	–	13	–	–	37	–	BPI: Silver
2004	Split the Difference: Released: 17 May 2004; Label: Hut / Virgin	35	24	–	39	–	191	11	–	
2006	How We Operate: Released: 2 May 2006; Label: ATO / Independiente	69	37	–	–	–	106	1	7	
2009	A New Tide: Released: 30 March 2009; Label: ATO, Eat Sleep	63	40	–	–	–	60	–	5	
2011	Whatever's on Your Mind: Released: 6 June 2011; Label: ATO, Eat Sleep	65	–	–	–	–	81	–	11	
