= Get Myself Arrested =

Single by Gomez

from the album Bring It On
- Released: 1 June 1998
- Recorded: 1996–1997
- Genre: Indie rock
- Length: 4:19
- Label: Hut Records
- Songwriters: Ian Ball, Ben Ottewell, Tom Gray, Paul Blackburn, Olly Peacock
- Producers: Gomez, Ken Nelson

Gomez singles chronology
"78 Stone Wobble" (1998)	"Get Myself Arrested" (1998)	"Whippin' Piccadilly" (1998)

"Get Myself Arrested" is a song by Gomez. It appears on their 1998 Mercury Prize-winning album Bring It On. It was released as a single on 1 June 1998, reaching #45 in the UK.

== Track listings ==
1. "Get Myself Arrested" - 4:05
2. "Flavours" - 3:11
3. "Old School Shirt" - 3:30
4. "The Cowboy Song" - 1:16

== Charts ==
Chart (1998)	Peak position
UK Singles (Official Charts)	45
