= Ben Goddard (musician) =

English singer-songwriter

- Born: Benjamin Paul Goddard; 24 November 1989 (age 36); Southampton, England
- Genres: Pop, rock, acoustic
- Occupations: Musician, singer-songwriter
- Instruments: Vocals, guitar, bass, piano, digeridoo
- Years active: 2000–present
- Website: bengoddard.co.uk

Benjamin Paul Goddard (born 24 November 1989) is an English singer-songwriter from Southampton, England.

In September 2013, Goddard embarked on a 20-date UK tour of universities as part of Huw Stephens and Coalition Talent's Coffee House Tour.

In late 2012, his single remix for "Fallen For You" entered the iTunes Electronic charts at No. 61.

Goddard has supported Nizlopi, Finley Quaye, Roddy Woomble of Idlewild, Nick Howard, Andy Burrows of Razorlight, Ben Ottewell from Gomez and James McCartney.
