= Unfold Yourself =

Studio album by Ian Ball
- Released: 31 May 2013

Ian Ball chronology
Who Goes There (2007)	Unfold Yourself (2013)

Unfold Yourself is the second solo album by Gomez singer and guitarist Ian Ball, released on May 31, 2013.

== Track listing ==
1. "One More State" - 3:51
2. "Open Sesame" - 3:50
3. "Open Night" - 5:03
4. "Memory Test" - 3:55
5. "Clearer" - 3:51
6. "Living Longer" - 4:38
7. "Rocket Science" - 4:46
8. "Changer" - 3:58
