= In Our Gun =

Studio album by Gomez
- Released: 18 March 2002
- Studio: Batsford Manor, Real World
- Genre: Alternative country; experimental pop; garage rock
- Length: 50:27
- Label: Hut, Virgin

Gomez chronology
| Abandoned Shopping Trolley Hotline (2000) | In Our Gun (2002) | Split the Difference (2004) |

Singles from In Our Gun
- 1. "Shot Shot" Released: March 4th, 2002; 2. "Sounds of Sound / Ping One Down" Released: June 3rd, 2002

In Our Gun is the third studio album by English rock band Gomez, released on 18 March 2002 by Hut Records.

== Background ==
Gomez released their second studio album Liquid Skin in September 1999. It peaked at number two in the UK; all three of its singles charted within the top 40 of the UK Singles Chart, with "Rhythm & Blues Alibi" reaching the highest at number 18. In April 2000, the band embarked on a UK tour, which was soon followed by stints in Australia, Japan, and the US. Around this time, they released the Machismo E.P., which saw the band explore electronica.

They released the compilation album Abandoned Shopping Trolley Hotline in September 2000, which was preceded by appearances at the Reading and Leeds Festivals. As the band had spent the preceding three years constantly touring, they took six-month break and visited Australia, Cambodia, and Vietnam, before working on their next album. By April 2001, the band were in the process of making demos for their next release. Sessions for the new album were held at Batsford Manor and Real World Studios, where the band and Miti Adhikari handling recording, with assistance from Claire Lewis. The band and Adhikari mixed the recordings at Real World, while Frank Arkwright mastered the album at The Townhouse.

== Composition and lyrics ==
Musically, the sound has been described as alternative country, garage rock, and experimental pop, with influence from electronica, which the band had previously touched on with the Machismo E.P.. The album is split into two parts: one centred around acoustic instrumentation, and the other being dance-based. It incorporates the use of drum machines, sequencers, loops, and samples. Lewis did extra programming and Dajon Everett provided percussion and celeste throughout the album. Over the course of it, additional musicians appeared on various songs: Tony Robinson with brass on "Shot Shot", trumpet and valve trombone on "Rex Kramer", "Detroit Swing 66" and "Even Song", and organ on "In Our Gun" and "Even Song"; Tony Looby with alto saxophone on "Detroit Swing 66" and "Even Song", and baritone saxophone on "Even Song"; Rob Charles with baritone saxophone on "Detroit Swing 66", and tenor saxophone on "Detroit Swing 66" and "Even Song"; Danny Thompson with double bass on "In Our Gun"; Grace Elison with vocals on "Drench"; and Graham Wakefield with loops on "Rex Kramer", and flange on "In Our Gun".

The album opens with "Shot Shot", an up-tempo song that includes saxophone, theremin, and a synthesizer. The psychedelic and electronic funk track "Rex Kramer" features guitarist Ben Ottewell on lead vocals. The folktronica "Detroit Swing 66" includes drum and bass breakbeats. "In Our Gun" begins as an alternative country ballad that shifts into techno-rock in the vein of the Prodigy partway through. Guitarist Ian Ball said the song was influenced by 2000 United States election controversy, and serves as the band's first excursion into protest songs. "Even Song" is a slow-paced blues song. "Ruff Stuff" sees arcade game sounds mixed with funk; it talks about a relationship that is ruined by the narrator's drug addiction.

"Sound of Sounds" is a ballad that evoked Liquid Skin song "We Haven't Turned Around". Guitarist Tom Gray said the track was "a love song to music itself". "Army Dub" is an industrial reggae song that recalled the work of the Beta Band. Ball said they wrote the song with a Roland TR-505, which they used to get a "massive powerful sound". "Miles End" talks about a ladies' man that has lost his ability to attract women, and is followed by the Brit funk song "Ping One Down". "Drench" is a psychedelic track, while "1000 Times" is a lullaby. The latter was inspired by a newspaper cover that Gray saw, depicting Posh Spice and David Beckham on the cover, "and on the fourth page, it was like, ‘50 killed in . . . ,’ and I said, what kind of universe am I living in here?" The album concludes with "Ballad of Nice & Easy", a southern rock song, which was reminiscent of the work of the Allman Brothers Band. It initially began as an acoustic-guitar-and-percussion piece, the tempo of which was sped up after drummer Olly Peacock heard it.

== Release ==
On 3 January 2002, In Our Gun was announced for release in two months' time. "Shot Shot" was released as a single on 4 March 2002. Two versions were released on CD: the first with "Silhouettes" and "Coltrane", while the second featured "Air-Hostess Song" and "Pop Juice". The music video for "Shot Shot" was posted on Dotmusic on 11 March 2002. In Our Gun was released on 18 March 2002 through Hut Records; Australia received a tour edition bonus disc. It was promoted with club nights and listening parties leading up to the release. The album was released in United States on 23 April 2002; 40,000 copies were sent to stores through distributor EMD. That same month, the band embarked on a four-week tour of the UK.

"Sound of Sounds" and "Ping One Down" were released as a Double A-Sided single on 20 May 2002. Two versions were released on CD: the first with "Where Are Your Friends", a live version of "Ping One Down", and the music video for "Sound of Sounds", while the second included "Click Click", an instrumental version of "Sound of Sounds", and the music video for "Ping One Down". The Detroit Swing 66 / Ping One Down EP was released exclusively in Australia on 16 July 2002, consisting of "Detroit Swing 66", "Ping One Down", "Silhouettes", "Coltrane", "Air-Hostess Song", "Pop Juice", and "Click Click". In September and October 2002, the band embarked on a tour of the US. Following this, they went on a UK tour in November and December 2002. In April and May 2003, the band toured the US again, which included an appearance at the Coachella Valley Music and Arts Festival.

== Reception ==
Professional ratings
Aggregate scores
| Source | Rating |
|---|---|
| Metacritic | 69/100 |
Review scores
| Source | Rating |
| AllMusic | 4/5 stars |
| Drowned in Sound | 8/10 |
| Entertainment Weekly | B |
| E! Online | B+ |
| NME | 7/10 |
| No Ripcord | 7/10 |
| Nude as the News | 6.5/10 |
| Pitchfork | 2.7/10 |
| Rolling Stone | 3.5/5 stars |
| Stylus | 5.9/10 |

In Our Gun was met with generally favourable reviews from music critics. At Metacritic, which assigns a normalized rating out of 100 to reviews from mainstream publications, the album received an average score of 69, based on 18 reviews.

In his review for PopMatters, contributor Matt Cibula wrote that "everyone who doesn’t like this record is insane in a bad way. Screw Wilco; In Our Gun is sounding very much like the Album of the Year." AllMusic reviewer Sean Westergaard said the album had "all the elements that made their debut so great, and then some." He explained that the band "cover a lot of musical territory, [...] with all the effortlessness displayed on Bring It On". Drowned in Sound writer Tom Carlin wrote that it was a "very good" release that sees the band dropping the "noodling, and have developed a much tighter, rigid sound". The staff at E! Online found the album to easily switch from different styles, with it be "creative, inspired and, most important, individual". Stephen Dalton of NME wrote that the album had "[t]ighter song structures, more varied sounds, richly layered production and subtle nods to deeper desires" that make it the "most accessible Gomez album yet for casual fans". No Ripcord's David Coleman found that some of the tracks were "tricky to listen to, but Gomez's credit a lot of it hits the spot as well". In spite of this, he called it a "brave" album for the band to make, as it "would have been a lot easier for them to peddle another album of the same" material as their earlier work.

Nude as the News's Western Homes wrote that the album was an improvement on "its languid predecessor [...] both in terms of economy and hooks, and the songs here largely don't outstay their welcomes". Rolling Stone reviewer Ernesto Lechner considered the songwriting to be "focused", with "plenty of soul beneath the multilayered structures and aesthetic braggadocio". Stylus writer Steve Lichtenstein said that "what ultimately drowns" the album was the "misguided attempts at moody electronica," which they had done more successfully in the past. Pitchfork contributor Eric Carr said the band "has seen fit to unleash a third installment in their war against discerning audiophiles everywhere, and they call it In Our Gun". He referred to it as "Frankenstein's monster of an album-- overwrought and disjointed, executed with some technical precision, but completely devoid of any flow, feeling, or spontaneity."

"Shot Shot" reached number 28 in the UK. "Sound of Sounds"/"Ping One Down" reached number 48 in the UK. No Ripchord ranked In Our Gun at number 35 on their list of The Top Fifty Albums of 2002.

== Track listing ==
All songs written by Gomez.

| No. | Title | Length |
|---|---|---|
| 1. | "Shot Shot" | 2:25 |
| 2. | "Rex Kramer" | 4:30 |
| 3. | "Detroit Swing 66" | 3:55 |
| 4. | "In Our Gun" | 5:14 |
| 5. | "Even Song" | 4:44 |
| 6. | "Ruff Stuff" | 2:28 |
| 7. | "Sound of Sounds" | 3:56 |
| 8. | "Army Dub" | 3:26 |
| 9. | "Miles End" | 4:22 |
| 10. | "Ping One Down" | 3:20 |
| 11. | "1000 Times" | 4:34 |
| 12. | "Drench" | 4:37 |
| 13. | "Ballad of Nice & Easy" | 2:51 |

== Personnel ==
Personnel per booklet.

Gomez

- Ian Ball – guitar, vocals
- Paul Blackburn – bass
- Tom Gray – guitar, keyboards, vocals
- Ben Ottewell – guitar, vocals
- Olly Peacock – drums

Additional musicians

- Claire Lewis – extra programming
- Dajon Everett – percussion, celeste
- Tony Robinson – brass (track 1), trumpet (tracks 2, 3 and 5), valve trombone (tracks 2, 3 and 5), organ (tracks 4 and 5)
- Tony Looby – alto saxophone (tracks 3 and 5), baritone saxophone (track 5)
- Rob Charles – tenor saxophone (tracks 3 and 5), baritone saxophone (track 3)
- Danny Thompson – double bass (track 4)
- Grace Ellson – vocals (track 12)
- Graham Wakefield – loop (track 2), flange (track 4)

Production and design

- Gomez – recording, mixing
- Miti Adhikari – recording, mixing
- Claire Lewis – assistance
- Frank Arkwright – mastering
- Jonathan Purday – art
- Scarlet Page – original band photography
- Love – art direction
