= Do One =

Do One may refer to:

- "Do One", a song by Gomez from Split the Difference, 2004
- "Do One", a song by Frank Turner from Undefeated, 2024
