= Old Man River (musician) =

Australian-Israeli singer-songwriter

Old Man River אוהד ריין
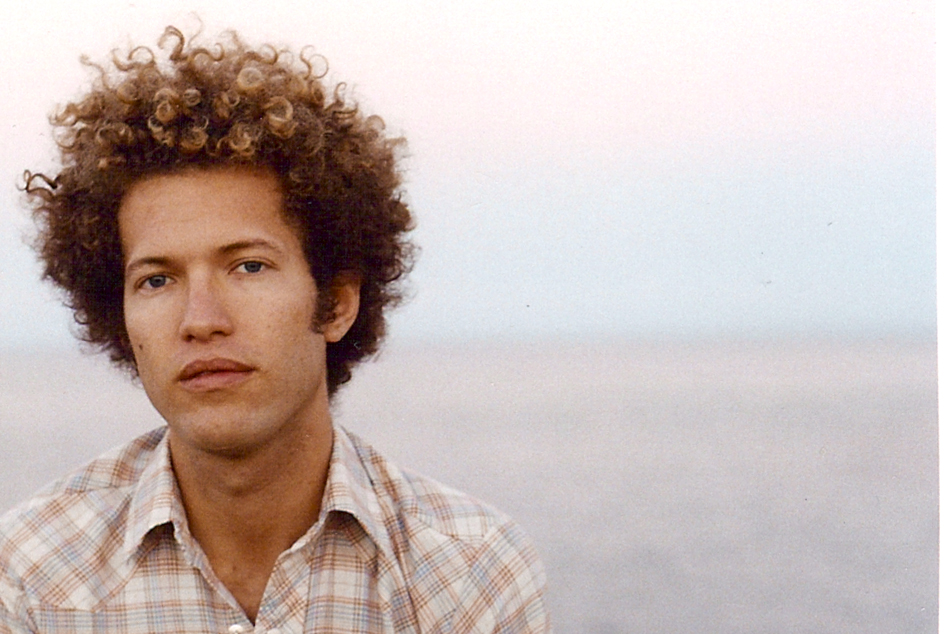

Background information
- Born: Ohad Rein; 18 April 1979 (age 47)
- Origin: Sydney, Australia
- Genres: Rock, folk
- Occupations: Musician, singer-songwriter
- Instruments: Vocals, guitar
- Years active: 2002–present
- Label: La La/EMI
- Website: oldmanrivermusic.com

Old Man River is the stage name of Australian-Israeli singer-songwriter Ohad Rein (Hebrew: אוהד ריין, [oˈ(h)ad ˈrejn], born 18 April 1979), which is also the name of his band. At the APRA Awards of 2009, "Sunshine", co-written by Old Man River, won the Blues & Roots Work of the Year category.

== Biography ==
Ohad Rein was born on 18 April 1979 and grew up in Sydney (Australia). His parents are Israeli immigrants. He moved to Europe with his family at a very early age before moving to Israel where he served in the local army during his formative years. He spent many years abroad before returning to Sydney. He collaborated with Sydney band, Gelbison, touring with the band and co-writing some of the tracks which appear on his debut album Good Morning. This led to the side project Nations by the River, which combined Gelbison with Luke Steele from Sleepy Jackson.

The single "Sunshine" was used as a theme for Channel 7's Sunrise. The single "La" reached #83 on the German singles chart, topped the Japanese Radio Airplay chart and was #6 on Italy's airplay chart. "La", "Trousers" and "Sunshine" all received significant airplay on Triple J.

The single "La" was featured in a New York Lottery commercial.

In 2014 Ohad Rein was one of the contestants on the third season of The Voice Israel.

== Members ==
- Ohad Rein (Vocals, Guitar)
- Liam Flanagan (Bass Guitar)
- Danny Heifetz (Drums)
- Rosie Henshaw (Backing Vocals, Sitar)

== Discography ==
=== Albums ===
List of albums
| Title | Album details |
|---|---|
| Good Morning | Released: 2007; Label: Sony BMG (88697065122); Formats: CD, download |
| Trust | Released: 2010; Label: Stop Start (SSM3); Formats: CD, download |

=== Extended plays ===
List of EPs, with selected chart positions
| Title | EP details | Peak chart positions |
| Title | EP details | AUS Physical |
|---|---|---|
| Sunshine | Released: October 2004; Label: Old Man River (OMR9190); Formats: CD, download | — |
| You're On My Mind | Released: June 2010; Label: Stop Start (SSM2); Formats: CD, download | 14 |

=== Charting singles ===
List of singles, with selected chart positions
| Title | Year | Chart positions | | Album |
| Title | Year | GER | ITA | Album |
|---|---|---|---|---|
| "La" | 2006 | 83 | 18 | Good Morning |

== Awards and nominations ==
=== APRA Awards ===
The APRA Awards are presented annually from 1982 by the Australasian Performing Right Association (APRA), "honouring composers and songwriters". They commenced in 1982.

| Year | Nominee / work | Award | Result | Ref. |
|---|---|---|---|---|
| 2008 | "La" | Blues & Roots Work of the Year | Nominated | |
| 2009 | "Sunshine" | Blues & Roots Work of the Year | Won | |
