= Machismo (disambiguation) =

Machismo is exaggerated masculinity.

Machismo may also refer to:

- Machismo (album), 1988, by Cameo
- "Machismo", Criminal Minds episode
- Machismo E.P., 2000, by Gomez
