= Gelbison =

Australian pop rock band (2000–2007)

- Origin: Sydney, New South Wales, Australia
- Genres: Pop rock, indie rock
- Years active: 2000–2007
- Label: Virgin/EMI
- Past members: Pete Farley; Dave Galafassi; Edo Kahn; Nadav Kahn
- Website: gelbison.com.au

Gelbison were an Australian pop rock band formed in 2000 by Pete Farley on bass guitar, Dave Galafassi on drums, Edo Kahn on vocals and guitar, and his brother Nadav Kahn on vocals and keyboards. The Kahn brothers were also members of Nations by the River (2003–04). Gelbison released two studio albums, 1704 (7 April 2003) and See the World (8 November 2004), and disbanded in 2007.

== History ==
Gelbison were formed in 2000 in Sydney by Pete Farley on bass guitar, horns and backing vocals; Dave Galafassi on drums; Edo Kahn on vocals and guitar; and his brother, Nadav Kahn, on vocals, harp and keyboards. Their first gig was at the Hollywood Hotel, Surry Hills attended by Ian Ball (Gomez); Nadav recalled, "We did meet [Ball] before [Gelbison formally] started. Edo and I met him in Bondi on a night out when [Gomez] were on their second tour in Australia and we connected on one very drunken night. Everyone ended up at my place, jamming until about six in the morning. So there was a musical and human connection. We somehow maintained contact."

The band's debut album, 1704, produced by Ball, was released on 7 April 2003 via Virgin Records and EMI Music Group Australia. It peaked at No. 20 on the ARIA Hitseekers Albums Chart. Greg Lawrence of Worldwide Home of Australasian Music and More Online (WHAMMO) felt it was "a work of understated genius. Having Ian Ball from Gomez co-producing certainly helps but the compositions, the arrangements and the sentiment communicated throughout Gelbison’s debut LP is virtually faultless and much more than clever guidance from an established artist/producer." Tim Cashmere of Undercover opined that "imagine if the out there factor could be multiplied by a thousand or so. That is one hell of a mellow album you've got there and local Sydney outfit Gelbison's major label debut is it."

Ahead of the album they issued their debut single, "Metal Detector" (October 2002), which Lawrence noticed "made an impact on radio regardless of dynamic, manic riffing that seemed to challenge the listener." Cashmere described it as one of the album's "moments when the group gathered up the energy to head down to 7-11 and instead channeled it into tracks like 'Metal Detector'." The following single, "Homelands" (February 2003), shows "a gentle flow but still contains imaginative garnishes and experimental textures." A third single, "Good God", followed the album in May. Farley described that track, "I didn’t write the lyrics for that one but, for me, I get a sense of hope in that song, hoping for something that you haven’t got but you long for. I think there’s a real sense of longing in that song." Galafassi had married Australian actress-singer, Toni Collette, in January that year. Collette directed the music video for "Good God".

Early in 2003 Gelbison were touring in support of the Sleepy Jackson, when Edo Kahn and Luke Steele (of the Sleepy Jackson) started jamming together one evening: they decided to create a side project, Nations by the River as an alt-country band. The pair were soon joined by Nadav and later by Ohad Rein; they issued their debut album, Holes in the Valley, in June 2004.

Gelbison's second album, See the World, was released on 8 November 2004, Ball returned for production duties, along with Ben Frost and Gelbison. Galafassi had left the group, while the remaining trio had started song writing in "a shack in Jarvis bay for [a] month writing period. In this time we compiled all our existing songs and wrote new songs and tried to decide on the best direction to take the record." They used Hamish Stewart to provide drums for about 30 demo versions. Frost used Pro Tools "and started hacking at the beats sometimes speeding them up/slowing them down where we felt appropriate and re-appropriating fills and hits amongst the songs." Ball "helped rework the song arrangements and structure and we tried to finish up all the tunes over the next three weeks in the studio. In this time we got in seven other drummers, as the need arose."

The album featured a number artists, Ball, Rein, Steel and Ben Lee. It peaked at No. 10 on the ARIA Hitseekers Albums Chart. A number of tracks, including, "All the Rage" and "Holy", received significant rotation on Triple J. In the first week of December, Australian journalist, Ed Nimmervoll, declared See the World to be his Feature Album of the Week, "the voice of John Lennon's solo work, the gentle pop power of the Go-Betweens and the beautifully crafted sonic attack of Radiohead and Gomez rolled into one. This is an incredibly accomplished and confident piece of work. Song after song is a gem. Don't let anyone tell you that people don't write good songs anymore."

By January 2006 Farley and Galafassi were members of Toni Collette & the Finish, a pop music group. The remaining Gelbison members severed ties with EMI in 2006 and worked on their third album towards the end of that year with J Walker aka Machine Translations as producer. After recording they returned to the studio and recorded a new range of songs with producer, Tony Buchen. Edo and Nadav Kahn decided to disband Gelbison and provided new material as the Kahn Brothers, with their debut album, Love Melts Fear, released in April 2007 through Shakti/Interia Records.

== Discography ==
=== Albums ===
1704

1704

Studio album by Gelbison
- Released: 7 April 2003
- Recorded: 2003
- Genre: Indie rock
- Label: Virgin/EMI
- Producer: Ian Ball

Track listing

1. "Kabana"
2. "Metal Detector"
3. "The Modern Station"
4. "Homelands"
5. "Time"
6. "Seven Takers"
7. "Au Revoir Fucker"
8. "Good God"
9. "1704"
10. "Wings"
11. "Norway"
12. "Revolution"

See the World

See the World

Studio album by Gelbison
- Released: 8 November 2004
- Recorded: 2004
- Genre: Indie rock
- Label: Virgin/EMI
- Producers: Ian Ball, Ben Frost, Gelbison

Track listing

1. "All the Rage"
2. "Holy"
3. "Keep It Clean"
4. "I Don't Want to Die Here with You"
5. "The Snow"
6. "All Your Scars"
7. "Summer of Love"
8. "Had to Lose"
9. "This Is a Warning"
10. "Poets"
11. "See the World"
12. "Be Broken to Be Whole"

=== Singles ===
- "Metal Detector" (October 2002) Virgin Records/EMI
- "Homelands" (February 2003) Virgin Records/EMI
- "Good God" (May 2003) Virgin Records/EMI
