= Dorothy Stringer School =

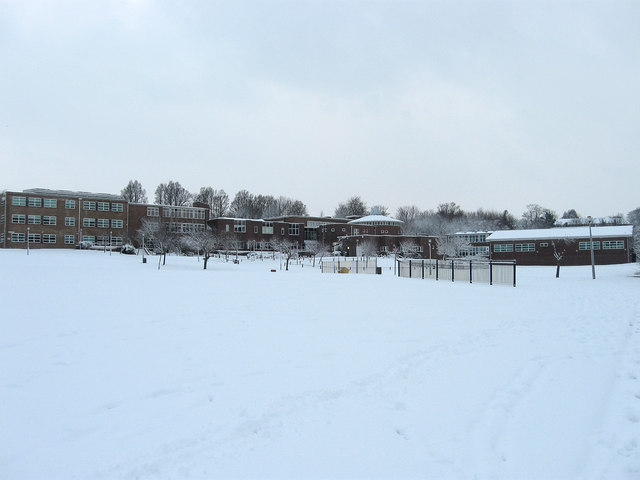
- The school in 2009

Location
- Loder Road; Brighton, East Sussex, BN1 6PZ; England; 50°50′56″N 0°08′36″W

Information
- Type: Community school
- Motto: Education for Life
- Established: 1955
- Local authority: Brighton and Hove
- Department for Education URN: 114580 Tables
- Ofsted: Reports
- Headteacher: Matt Hillier
- Staff: 120
- Gender: Coeducational
- Age: 11 to 16
- Enrolment: 1681
- Colours: Black and yellow
- Website: www.dorothy-stringer.co.uk

Dorothy Stringer School is a secondary school located in Brighton, East Sussex, England. It has over 1,600 pupils and 115 members of staff. There are 64 forms, each with an average of 26 students.

Dorothy Stringer shares their location, the Surrenden Campus with Varndean School, Varndean College, Balfour Primary School and Downs View Link college.

== Location and history ==
The school is named after Dorothy Stringer, who was mayoress of Brighton in 1952 and a member of the Council's education committee for over 50 years.

The site of Dorothy Stringer School was once Varndean Farm (est. late nineteenth century) The land around the farm was purchased by Brighton County Borough Council's education committee in 1909, after an outbreak of foot and mouth disease amongst the farm animals. Five schools were built; Balfour Road Primary School and Junior School (opened 1924) Varndean Secondary School (opened 1926) and Varndean College Sixth Form College (opened 1931). Dorothy Stringer was opened in 1955. The campus is bounded by Surrenden Road, Loder Road, Balfour Road and Friar Crescent, with Stringer Way providing an alternative entrance via the main staff car park. Local buses include the 5B, the 94 and 94a, which serve as combined school buses for Dorothy Stringer and Varndean to Hanover and Kemptown.

== Awards and initiatives ==
Dorothy Stringer gained the Eco-Schools Green Flag award in 2000 and has maintained its status, updating the school as rules become stricter. It was the only secondary school in Brighton to hold this award until its renewal in June 2016, and the school secured the award for the 9th time in 2021. In the late 1990s, the school focused on recycling and improving the look of the school grounds. Since 2000 the Dorothy Stringer Environmental Partnership has focused on increasing the biodiversity of the grounds and solar power. In 2003, a dilapidated classroom building set among the woodland was renovated into the Brian Foster Environment Centre, named after a late teacher. From this base, Dorothy Stringer has become the lead environmental school in Brighton and Hove, forming international links with St Joseph's School in Le Havre for which funding from the Franco-British Council was won, and a student exchange trip is run for Year Seven pupils. Dorothy Stringer is also known for its forming of links with neighbouring schools and, within the school, involving a large number of students in educational environmental activities.

Dorothy Stringer became a specialist sports school in 2002 and despite the government abolishing specialisms in schools in 2012, sport remains an important feature: pupils receive at least two hours of sport education a week, in line with government guidelines. Becoming a sports school has entailed the demolition of the sports hall and the construction of a new venue twice the size, with an additional dance studio, gym and changing rooms. As part of the school's responsibilities as a sports school, Dorothy Stringer undertakes work to promote sport in local primary schools, which is chiefly done through the JSLA and a new scheme which involves establishing and nurturing dance clubs in local primary schools and organising a mass performance named "Let's Dance" as well as their own Dorothy Stringer Dance Show, both of which are held at the Brighton Dome.

Dorothy Stringer is also a part of the Healthy School initiative, a Partnership Promotion School, a Training School, a recipient of money from the Big Lottery Fund for the school newsletter, and benefits from the European Union's III A programme. Dorothy Stringer has long owned the Dolawen Centre, an outdoor pursuits centre on a working farm in the Snowdonia National Park near Bangor, north-west Wales. This facility allows the school to organise annual trips for its Year 7 pupils and lease the building for the use of other schools, organisations and individuals.

In January 2017, Dorothy Stringer was listed as one of the UK's best state schools in Tatler Magazine, which praised the school's GCSE results and sports facilities.

== Academies Act 2010 ==
On 25 June the new Conservative-Liberal coalition released details of 'Outstanding' schools that had, so far, expressed an interest in Academy status, under the Academies Act 2010. Dorothy Stringer School was one of the education establishments on this list, indicating the governors' wish to receive more information and explore all possible options.

== Notable former students ==
- Sean Ellis, film director
- Harley Alexander-Sule, musician from hip-hop group Rizzle Kicks
- Jessica Hynes, actor and comedian
- Lucy Griffiths, actor
- Will Becher, film director, Aardman Animations
- Steve Palmer, footballer
- James Daly, footballer
- Seann Walsh, comedian
- John McEnery, actor

== Bibliography ==
- Collis, Rose (2010). The New Encyclopaedia of Brighton. (based on the original by Tim Carter) (1st ed.). Brighton: Brighton & Hove Libraries. ISBN 978-0-9564664-0-2.
