= Gelbison (disambiguation) =

Gelbison may refer to:

- Gelbison, an Australian pop rock band based in Sydney
- Gelbison Cilento S.S.D., an Italian football club based in Vallo della Lucania
- Mount Gelbison, an Italian mountain of Campania region located in the middle of Cilento
