= Rex Kramer =

Rex Kramer may refer to:

- Rex Kramer, Danger Seeker, a character in the 1977 American comedy film The Kentucky Fried Movie
- Rex Kramer, a character in the 1980 American comedy film Airplane!
- "Rex Kramer", a song by Gomez from their 2002 album In Our Gun
