= Chicken Out =

Chicken Out may refer to:

- Chicken Out (album), a 1994 album by the Ziggens
- "Chicken Out", a song by Gomez from Split the Difference
