= Nations by the River =

Side project band

- Origin: Newcastle, New South Wales, Australia
- Genres: Alternative country, folk
- Years active: 2003–2004
- Labels: EMI/Virgin; Astralwerks
- Past members: Luke Steele; Edo Kahn; Nadav Kahn; Ohad Rein

Nations by the River were an Australian side project formed by Luke Steele (Sleepy Jackson), Ohad Rein (Old Man River) and the Kahn Brothers (Gelbison) that occurred in 2003 to 2004. Nations by the River only created a single album, Holes in the Valley, before the members went back to their main bands.

== Biography ==
Nations By The River formed during the Gelbison/The Sleepy Jackson tour of early 2003, when Luke Steele (Sleepy Jackson) and Edo Kahn (Gelbison) started jamming and writing songs in a car park after misplacing their van's keys. Dove Kahn soon joined in and Nations By The River was established as a side project for the three. Ohad Rein (Old Man River) and Edo Kahn co-wrote the song "Lovers", and shortly after Ohad joined the group.

The album was recorded in three days as a stripped-back and live experience with engineer/co-producer Scott Horscroft (Sun, The Husbands). In the studio, Nations were joined by friends and local musicians, including Sarah Blasko and Hamish Stuart. The album, Holes in the Valley, was released 7 June 2004 on EMI/Virgin, and distributed overseas on Astralwerks. In July 2005 the album was also released in the United States on the Astralwerks label.

== Members ==
- Edo Kahn — vocals, guitar
- Luke Steele — vocals, guitar
- Ohad Rein — vocals, guitar
- Nadav Kahn — guitar, keys, percussion

== Discography ==
=== Albums ===
- Holes in the Valley - EMI/Virgin (7 June 2004); Astralwerks (25 July 2005)

==== Track listing ====
1. "I Don't Want You" - 1:19
2. "Boy" - 3:37
3. "Heart Attack Romance" - 2:16
4. "Cracking Up" - 2:28
5. "Kids World" - 2:16
6. "These Are the Times" - 3:15
7. "Lovers" - 2:30
8. "Would It Be Nice" - 4:11
9. "Farewell Sunshine" - 1:29
10. "Heroin" - 4:00
11. "The Prettiest Girl" - 2:01
12. "We Dance Everyday" - 4:18
