= Personality – One Was a Spider, One Was a Bird =

Studio album by the Sleepy Jackson
- Released: 1 July 2006
- Recorded: 2006
- Genre: Indie rock; experimental pop
- Length: 42:53
- Label: Capitol
- Producer: Scott Horscroft; Luke Steele

The Sleepy Jackson chronology
Lovers (2003)	Personality – One Was a Spider, One Was a Bird (2006)

Singles from Personality – One Was a Spider, One Was a Bird
- 1. "God Lead Your Soul" Released: 25 May 2006; 2. "Devil Was in My Yard" Released: 25 September 2006 (Australia); 3. "I Understand What You Want but I Just Don't Agree" Released: 16 October 2006 (UK)

Professional ratings
Review scores
Source	Rating
AllMusic	3.5/5 stars
The Independent	2/5 stars
Pitchfork	7.8/10
PopMatters	8/10
Q	4/5 stars
Slant Magazine	3.5/5 stars
Stylus Magazine	B

Personality – One Was a Spider, One Was a Bird is the second album by Australian band the Sleepy Jackson, released in July 2006. The album was recorded at Big Jesus Burger Studios in Sydney, and was produced by Scott Horscroft and Luke Steele. Guests on the album include the Presets, Jim Moginie (Midnight Oil) and Davey Lane (You Am I), among others.

In an interview for PerthMusic, drummer Malcolm Clark explains the album's title:

"Well the Personality bit has to do with all the people that were involved in making this record and the different aspects that they brought along. The Spider/Bird bit has to do with some religious symbolism. It shows the two different sides – God/Devil, Good/Evil, and leaves it up to each person to make up their own mind. Some people might see the Spider as evil and the Bird as good, other people might see the complete opposite."

At the J Award of 2006, the album was nominated for Australian Album of the Year.

== Critical reception ==
It was released in the United Kingdom to very positive reviews from a number of publications, including NME, Mojo, Uncut, Q and The Guardian. Other reviews, such as The Independent, have been more critical, stating: "Steele's work here has been lazily and mistakenly compared to that of Spector and Wilson, but there's no succulent centre of comparable song craft hiding inside these over-egged, tune-dodging arrangements, merely the fantasy that ambition is the gateway to genius."

In Craig Mathieson's book, Playlisted, he argues that Steele is overrated and that the album was "overblown for the sake of being overblown".

The album debuted at number 10 on the Australian ARIA Albums Chart and number 69 on the Swedish Albums Chart. The album was also nominated for a J Award by Australian radio station Triple J. Three singles were released from the album: "God Lead Your Soul" in May 2006, "Devil Was in My Yard" in September 2006 (in Australia only), and "I Understand What You Want but I Just Don't Agree" in October 2006 (UK only).

The album sold 50,000 copies.

== Track listing ==
All tracks written by Luke Steele except where noted.

1. "You Needed More" – 3:09
2. "Devil Was in My Yard" – 3:21
3. "God Lead Your Soul" – 3:29
4. "Work Alone" – 3:03
5. "God Knows" – 2:58
6. "I Understand What You Want but I Just Don't Agree" – 3:20
7. "Miles Away" – 2:36
8. "Higher Than Hell" – 2:55
9. "Play a Little Bit for Love" – 4:30
10. "Don't Say" (Steele, Andrew Klippel, Jessica Origliasso, Lisa Origliasso) – 3:06
11. "You Won't Bring People Down in My Town" – 3:18
12. "Dream On" – 2:58
13. "How Was I Supposed to Know" – 4:04

A special edition was also released in Australia, which included a bonus DVD featuring a 'making-of' the album documentary, the music video for "God Lead Your Soul", and a photo gallery.

== Charts ==
=== Weekly charts ===
Chart (2006)	Peak position
Australian Albums (ARIA)	10
French Albums (SNEP)	183
Swedish Albums (Sverigetopplistan)	42
