= Operation Aloha (album) =

Studio album by Operation Aloha
- Released: May 12, 2009
- Recorded: 2009
- Length: 59:59
- Label: Operation Aloha

Operation Aloha is the only album released by a supergroup of 14 musicians of the same name. The album was conceived by photographer Christopher Wray-McCann who asked some of his musician friends if they wanted to live in a treehouse and record an album in Maui, Hawaii for 30 days. The group did not tour extensively, only appearing live on Last Call with Carson Daly and at The Troubadour to support the album.

== Track listing ==
No.	Title	Length
1.	"Ika Pona"	1:41
2.	"Failure"	3:56
3.	"Elephant Pharmacy"	4:23
4.	"Phone Booth"	3:36
5.	"Disappointed Type"	5:13
6.	"Rain"	5:30
7.	"Secret Song"	4:25
8.	"Hat"	0:41
9.	"Intercepted"	3:30
10.	"Blue Eyed Son"	3:46
11.	"Akoha"	3:18
12.	"Waltzing Matilda"	6:24
13.	"That Pier"	6:30
14.	"..."	6:58

Alternative versions of the songs "Failure" and "Elephant Pharmacy" are also on Ian Ball's solo album Who Goes There?

== Band members ==
- Dajon Everett (Gomez)
- Ian Ball (Gomez)
- Olly Peacock (Gomez)
- James Valentine (Maroon 5)
- Jesse Carmichael (Maroon 5)
- Sam Farrar (Phantom Planet)
- Fil Krohnengold (All Spots To Black)
- Nadav Kahn (Kahn Brothers)
- Charles Danek
- Mathew Chaney
- Maureen Wray-McCann
- Saam Gabbay
- Will Nash
- Christopher Wray-McCann (Photographer)
