= Vampire Racecourse =

Single by The Sleepy Jackson

from the album Lovers
- Released: 7 July 2003
- Genre: Indie rock
- Length: 3:10
- Label: EMI/Capitol
- Songwriter(s): Luke Steele
- Producer(s): Jonathan Burnside

The Sleepy Jackson singles chronology
"Vampire Racecourse" (2003)	"Good Dancers" (2003)

"Vampire Racecourse" is a song by The Sleepy Jackson released as the first single from their debut album Lovers. The song peaked at number 71 in Australia and number 50 in the UK.

== Track listings ==
=== Australian CD ===
1. "Vampire Racecourse"
2. "Hell Is Here"
3. "Revolution"
4. "Holly"
5. "Mosquito Kids"

=== UK CD ===
1. "Vampire Racecourse"
2. "Hell Is Here"
3. "Holly"

=== UK 7" on red-colored vinyl ===
1. "Vampire Racecourse"
2. "Glasshouses"

== Charts ==
Chart performance for "Vampire Racecourse"
Chart (2003)	Peak position
Australia (ARIA)	71
UK Singles (OCC)	50
