= God Lead Your Soul =

Single by The Sleepy Jackson

from the album Personality – One Was a Spider, One Was a Bird
- Released: 29 May 2006 (Australia); 17 July 2006 (UK)
- Recorded: 2006
- Genre: Indie rock
- Length: 3:29
- Label: EMI; Virgin
- Songwriter(s): Luke Steele
- Producer(s): Scott Horscroft, Luke Steele

The Sleepy Jackson singles chronology
"Come to This" (2004)	"God Lead Your Soul" (2006)	"Devil Was in My Yard" (2006)

"God Lead Your Soul" is a song by Australian band, The Sleepy Jackson. It was released in May 2006 as the lead single from their second studio album, Personality – One Was a Spider, One Was a Bird. The song peaked at number 25 on the ARIA Charts The song was then released in the United Kingdom on 17 July 2006.

== Track listings ==
Australian CD single: Capitol 360524 2 (EMI) [au] / EAN 0094636052427

1. "God Lead Your Soul" – 3:29
2. "Harmony of the Heart" – 2:11
3. "Willow Tree" – 2:03
4. "Rivers" – 2:21
5. "Mixmatch" – 1:09

UK CD single

1. "God Lead Your Soul" – 3:29
2. "Got to Get Moving" – 2:11
3. "(Just Like) Starting Over" (John Lennon cover) – 4:10

UK 7" #1

- Gate fold sleeve
1. "God Lead Your Soul" – 3:29
2. "She's Going to Be Alright" – 3:06

UK 7" #2

- White-coloured vinyl inside a fold-out poster sleeve
1. "God Lead Your Soul" – 3:29
2. "Ryiuchi" – 1:22

== Charts ==
Chart performance for "God Lead Your Soul"
Chart (2006)	Peak position
Australia (ARIA)	25
UK Singles (OCC)	69
