= Good Dancers =

Rock band

Single by The Sleepy Jackson

from the album Lovers
- Released: 13 October 2003
- Genre: Indie rock
- Length: 4:12
- Label: EMI/Capitol/Astralwerks
- Songwriter: Luke Steele
- Producer: Jonathan Burnside

The Sleepy Jackson singles chronology
"Vampire Racecourse" (2003)	"Good Dancers" (2003)	"Come to This" (2004)

"Good Dancers" is a 2003 song by Australian alternative rock duo The Sleepy Jackson, released on 13 October 2003 as the second single from the album Lovers. The song charted at #71 in the UK.

== Music videos ==
Two music videos were produced for the song. The first was directed by Nash Edgerton and depicts a janitor (played by Dan Wyllie) in a hospital walking into a sparse room and eventually dancing with a fellow nurse (played by Rita Kalnejais). The second, produced for the song's American release, has a different narrative and centers around angels in a forest running and dancing. The music video was nominated for Best Video at the ARIA Music Awards of 2004.

== Track listing ==
UK CD single

1. "Good Dancers" (radio edit)
2. "Come to This" (acoustic)
3. "Good Dancers – Acoustic Radio 1 Blue Room"
4. "Bucket of Love"
5. "Raindrop"

== Charts ==
Chart performance for "Good Dancers"
Chart (2003)	Peak position
UK Singles (Official Charts)	71
