= Broken Record campaign =

Music creator campaign

The Broken Record campaign is a campaign expressing music creators’ discontent with the streaming business model and asking for fairer remuneration. The campaign was created by Tom Gray, a musician and part of the rock band, Gomez, in April 2020.

The campaign sought UK government regulation of the music industry and improved rights for music creators under UK Copyright Law. The campaign also sought the shift of business model from the current use of “pro-rata” or “revenue share” model to a user-centric model.

In July 2021, the Digital, Culture, Media and Sport Committee published a report recommending alterations to the streaming business model, while in January 2022, the Competition & Markets Authority announced a study into the music streaming market.

== Overview ==
During the COVID-19 pandemic, musicians could not perform live shows and had to rely on income from music streaming. As per the current system of streaming services, artists receive around 16% of the total income from streams, while the record companies take approximately 41% and streaming services takes an average of 29%.

In April 2020, Tom Gray first used the hashtag, #BrokenRecord on Twitter commenting on the state of the modern music industry. The hashtag was used by other music creators to voice their own dissatisfaction. In May 2020, the campaign hosted a Twitter listening party featuring Boy George, The Shins, KT Tunstall and John Grant. The campaign also received support from the Musicians' Union and The Ivors Academy.

In October 2020, the Digital, Culture, Media and Sport Committee, announced an inquiry into the ‘Economics of Streaming’. The inquiry received evidence from more than 300 artists’ including oral evidence from Nile Rodgers, Ed O'Brien, Guy Garvey, Nadine Shah and organizations including Sony Music, Warner Music, Universal Music, Spotify, Amazon, Apple and YouTube.

In April 2021, the campaign wrote to the then British Prime Minister, Boris Johnson, calling for improved rights and remuneration for music creators and a referral of the industry to the UK Competition & Markets Authority. The letter was co-signed by Paul McCartney, Kate Bush, The Rolling Stones, Chris Martin and over 200 other notable people in the British music industry.

== Result ==
In June 2021, Sony Music announced to clear historic debts held against their artists. In July 2021, the Digital, Culture, Media and Sport Committee published their report recommending alternative payment systems for artists, measures to be introduced allowing music creators to recapture the rights to their work from labels after a period of time, legally enforceable obligations to normalize licensing arrangements for user-generated content-hosting services, and asked publishers and collecting societies to publish royalty chain information.

In September 2021, the UK government accepted the recommendation to refer to the Competition & Markets Authority, and initiated research from the UK’s Intellectual Property Office alongside representatives from the industry to further look at the select committee’s recommendations.

In January 2022, the Competition & Markets Authority announced a study into the music streaming market. In April 2022, Universal and Warner Music Groups also announced to clear unrecouped balances so that their contracted artists can earn from their recorded music.

In June 2022, Kevin Brennan, a Member of the UK Parliament, introduced a Private Members Bill to the House of Commons called ‘Copyright (Rights and Remuneration of Musicians, etc.)’ which is currently in second reading.
