= Liquid Skin =

Studio album by Gomez
- Released: 13 September 1999
- Recorded: August 1998 – June 1999
- Studios: Parr Street, Liverpool; Abbey Road, London
- Genre: Blues rock
- Length: 55:28
- Label: Hut (Virgin)
- Producer: Gomez

Gomez chronology
Bring It On (1998)	Liquid Skin (1999)	Machismo E.P. (2000)

Singles from Liquid Skin
- 1. "Bring It On" Released: June 28, 1999; 2. "Rhythm & Blues Alibi" Released: August 30, 1999; 3. "We Haven't Turned Around" Released: November 15, 1999

Liquid Skin is the second album by English rock group Gomez, released on 13 September 1999 by Hut Records. Following the release of their debut studio album Bring It On (1998), the band began recording their follow-up between August 1998 and June 1999 at Parr Street Studios in Liverpool, and Abbey Road Studios in London. Gomez were allowed to self-produce the sessions after their label heard the strength of their demos. Described as a blues rock album, Liquid Skin was compared to the work of Beck, the Grateful Dead, and Pearl Jam.

Liquid Skin received generally favourable reviews from critics, many of whom found it to be a retread of Bring It On with improved production. Preceded by a two-month tour of the United States, "Bring It On" was released as the lead single from Liquid Skin on 28 June 1999. Gomez appeared at a number of festivals, prior to the release of the album's second single "Rhythm & Blues Alibi" on 30 August 1999. Coinciding with the release of Liquid Skin, the band embarked on tours of the US and the UK, which were then followed by its third single "We Haven't Turned Around" on 8 November 1999. All three singles reached the top 40 of the UK Singles Chart, with "Rhythm & Blues Alibi" peaking the highest at number 18.

== Background ==
Gomez released their debut studio album Bring It On in April 1998. It peaked at number 11 in the UK, where it won the Mercury Music Prize. All three of its singles charted on the UK Singles Chart, with "Whippin' Piccadilly" reaching the highest at number 35. It was promoted with a tour of the United States supporting Eagle-Eye Cherry.

Based on the strength of the demos the band had made, their label let them self-produce their next album. Sessions for it began at Parr Street Studios in Liverpool in August 1998. By November 1998, the band were working at Abbey Road Studios, where they recorded strings, before moving to a mansion near Hastings. Guitarist Ian Ball said they moved so that they would be able to "recreate the home-recorded sound of the first album, but in grander surroundings". They took a break to play a US tour with Mojave 3 in April and May 1999. Gomez had collectively recorded 32 songs during the recording sessions; they had finished in June 1999.

== Composition and lyrics ==
Musically, the sound of Liquid Skin has been described as blues rock, rooted in American blues and folk, with elements of art rock and psychedelic music. It has been compared to the work of Pearl Jam (specifically their 1996 album No Code), Beck, and the Grateful Dead. Acoustic guitars lead the majority of the songs, which are accompanied by horns, strings, and keyboards. There is a bigger emphasis on vocals and harmonies; in contrast to Bring It On, which typically featured one singer per track, most of the songs on Liquid Skin had all three (Ball, guitarist Tom Gray, and guitarist Ben Ottewell). Ottewell theorised that the band's experience travelling in Australia, Europe and the United States influenced their writing. The album's title went through multiple names – God's Big Spaceship and Touching Up – before settling on Liquid Skin, which was inspired by a product they had found while in the United States. They almost called it Liquid State, though Gray said that as a title it was "not as good as 'Liquid Skin'." Ball described it as a "party record", with the "general theme" being "how many different ways we can play the same song in four minutes".

The sitar-driven opening track, "Hangover", deals with love and being drunk, according to Gray. It is a delta blues song that opens with Ken Nelson misquoting the opening line from Pink Floyd's The Wall (1979), followed by a loud bassline. "Revolutionary Kind" sees the band mix country and techno, recalling the work of Alabama 3. Gray wrote the song in a house on Ash Grove in Leeds; when they were recording it, the hall they were tracking in would burn down frequently. "Bring It On", the name of which alludes to the band's debut, includes a reference to that album's opening song, "Get Miles". It ends with a raga rock coda; the song was written around the same time as "Tijuana Lady" (from Bring It On), though was abandoned and left off their debut. Gray wrote "Blue Moon Rising" as a reaction to the death of Princess Diana. "Las Vegas Dealer" begins as a psychedelic piece and vocal harmonies in the vein of the Moody Blues, before incorporating Eastern rhythms. Ball said it was written about a drunken night while in Las Vegas, Nevada, with Nuno Bettencourt's father.

"We Haven't Turned Around" features cellos; it originally began under the title "Canderel" with a different chorus section. "Fill My Cup" transitions over the course of its length from blues to skate metal, with two middle eight sections. "Rhythm & Blues Alibi" was written by Ball while attending university; Ottewell saw it as "taking the piss out of R&B music" and "the band and probably me, particularly!". Ball was playing guitar with a Zoom Sampletrak sampler, when Gray suggested using some of the parts from it as the song's bridge section. Gray described the song as being a dig at a lot of "landfill RnB in the late-90s, but we were also saying that we were dicks appropriating black culture". "California" is a slow-building song that incorporates droning, and switches to a boogie; throughout this, the song details escaping California. The composition of the song was completed while backstage during a show with Mojave 3 at the Troubadour in West Hollywood. The closing track, "Devil Will Ride", uses a vocoder and marching band horns, concluding with a Beatlesque fadeout. Ball said the song was known under the working title of "God's Big Spaceship".

== Release ==
Gomez embarked on a tour of the US in April and May 1999, where they were supported by Mojave 3; they cancelled shows in Europe to focus on the US. On 20 June 1999, Liquid Skin was announced for release in three months' time. "Bring It On" was released as the lead single from the album on 28 June 1999. Two versions were released on CD: the first with "Dire Tribe" and "M57", while the second included "Chicken Bones" and "Step Inside". They then appeared at the Glastonbury, T in the Park and V Festivals over the next two months. "Rhythm & Blues Alibi" was released as a single on 30 August 1999. Two versions were released on CD: the first with "The Best in Town" and "So", while the second included a "pre-mellotron" version of "Rhythm & Blues Alibi", "ZYX", and a live version of "Tijuana Lady" (under the name "Tijuanalaska").

Liquid Skin was released through Hut Records on 13 September 1999; its US release occurred a week later. Coinciding with this, the band went on a tour of the US and then the UK in October and November 1999. "We Haven't Turned Around" was released as a single on 8 November 1999. Two versions were released on CD: the first with "Flight" and "Rosemary", while the second featured an "X-Ray" version of "We Haven't Turned Around", "Gomez in a Bucket (A Seaside Town Made of Ice Cream, Slowly Melting)", and "Emergency Surgery".

"Bring It On" and "We Haven't Turned Around" were included on the band's second compilation album, Five Men in a Hut: A's, B's and Rarities 1998–2004 (2004). Liquid Skin was packaged with Bring It On as a two-CD combo in 2003. The band's first four studio albums and Five Men in a Hut: A's, B's and Rarities 1998–2004, were collected together as 5 Album Set in 2012. Liquid Skin was reissued in 2019 as a two-CD set that included a live show, demos, and alternative versions. Ball had become the band's archivist and helped bring the reissue to fruition. Following this, the band toured across the UK and Australia, where they played the album in its entirety.

== Reception ==
Professional ratings
Review scores
Source	Rating
AllMusic	3.5/5 stars
Alternative Press	3/5
Entertainment Weekly	A
The Guardian	5/5 stars
Los Angeles Times	3/4 stars
NME	7/10
PopMatters	7.1/10
Q	4/5 stars
Rolling Stone	3.5/5 stars
Spin	8/10

Liquid Skin was met with generally favourable reviews from music critics. Tom Sinclair of Entertainment Weekly noted that the band had been referred to as roots rock, "but one listen to their sophomore CD shows they’re twisting those roots into strange and marvelous shapes". AllMusic reviewer Stephen Thomas Erlewine saw the album as a "cleaner, more streamlined version" of Bring It On, adding that they perform music "that they believe to be experimental or rootsy, but not quite going far enough in either direction". NME Piers Martin also found it to be "very much like" their debut, "only bigger, even more confident and with far better production".

Los Angeles Times writer Richard Cromelin said Gomez had "a free-ranging imagination, twisting and distorting and juxtaposing [their songs] with an exhilarating sense of freedom". PopMatters editor Sarah Zupko wrote that band had "picked up a few new studio tricks or two and rounded out their sound with fuller textures and better-produced mixes". She added that the "back-to-the-country-sounding songs" had a "trippy vibe," and were "just as good as ever". In a review for Rolling Stone, journalist Greg Kot wrote that "the arrangements on Liquid Skin are more substantial, beefed up with strings and horns, and the songs sturdier" than those on Bring It On.

"Bring It On" reached number 21 in singles chart. "Rhythm & Blues Alibi" reached number 18. "We Haven't Turned Around" reached number 38. CMJ New Music Report ranked the album at number 13 on their list of the Top 30 Editorial Picks of 1999. PopMatters included it on their Most Memorable Albums of the year list.

== Track listing ==
All songs written by Gomez except where noted.

1. "Hangover" – 3:27 (Gomez, Matt Turner)
2. "Revolutionary Kind" – 4:32
3. "Bring It On" – 4:10
4. "Blue Moon Rising" – 4:48
5. "Las Vegas Dealer" – 3:55
6. "We Haven't Turned Around" – 6:29
7. "Fill My Cup" – 4:39
8. "Rhythm & Blues Alibi" – 5:03
9. "Rosalita" – 4:05
10. "California" – 7:24
11. "Devil Will Ride" – 6:56

== Personnel ==
As per CD Booklet

=== Gomez ===
Ben Ottewell - Vocals, Guitar

Ian Ball - Vocals, Guitar

Tom Gray - Vocals, Keyboards, Guitar

Paul Blackburn - Bass

Olly Peacock - Drums, Programming

=== Production and Design ===
Gomez- Production

Ken Nelson - Engineering

Paul Hicks - Engineering

=== Additional Musicians ===
Dajon Everett - Percussive titan on all tracks

Matt Turner - Guitar and vocals on 'Hangover'

Ken Nelson - Extra Guitar on 'Bring It On'

Alton Towers and Disco ken - Flamengo hand claps on 'Las Vegas Dealer'

Steve Fellow - Flange Guitar on 'Rhythmn and Blues Alibi' and abstract/heroic guitar on 'Devil will Ride'

Tony Robinson, Tony Looby, Rob Charles - Brass on 'Devil will Ride

Mojave 3, Ward, Krishnadasan, Bramham, Page & Joey the Dog - vocals on 'Devil will Ride'

Jack Tinkler - Piano on 'Devil will Ride'

== Charts ==
=== Charts ===
Chart performance for Liquid Skin
Chart (1999–2000)	Peak position
Australian Albums (ARIA)	9
Irish Albums (IRMA)	73
New Zealand Albums (RMNZ)	40
Norwegian Albums (VG-lista)	19
Scottish Albums (Official Charts)	2
UK Albums (Official Charts)	2

=== Year-end charts ===
1999–2000 year-end chart performance for Liquid Skin
Chart (1999)	Position
UK Albums (OCC)	65
Chart (2000)	Position
Australian Albums (ARIA)	96

== Certifications ==
Region	Certification	Certified units/sales
Australia (ARIA)	Platinum	70,000^{^}
^{^} Shipments figures based on certification alone.
