= Five Men in a Hut: Singles 1998–2004 =

Five Men In A Hut: Singles 1998-2004

Video by Gomez
- Released: 17 October 2006
- Genre: Rock
- Label: Virgin Records Hut Records
- Producer: Gomez; Tchad Blake

Gomez chronology
Five Men In A Hut (CD) (2006)	Five Men In A Hut: Singles 1998-2004 (2006)	A New Tide (2009)

Five Men In A Hut (DVD) is a DVD release by the British band Gomez, as a companion to the Five Men in a Hut B-sides compilation. It features videos for many of the band's songs, along with some interviews with the band members and some live performances.

== Track listing ==
1. "78 Stone Wobble (Video)"
2. "Get Myself Arrested (Video)"
3. "Whippin’ Piccadilly (Video)"
4. "Bring It On (Video)"
5. "Rhythm and Blues Alibi (Video)"
6. "We Haven’t Turned Around (Video)"
7. "Machismo (Video)"
8. "Shot Shot (Video)"
9. "Sound of Sounds (Video)"
10. "Ping One Down (Video)"
11. "Catch Me Up (Video)"
12. "Silence (Video)"
13. "Bring It On (Interview)"
14. "Make No Sound (Live at the Music Centre, Dublin)"
15. "78 Stone Wobble (Live at the Music Centre, Dublin)"
16. "Hangover (Live at Liquid Skin Launch Showcase)"
17. "Way You Do the Things You Do (Live at Liquid Skin Launch Showcase)"
18. "Rosemary (Live at Liquid Skin Launch Showcase)"
19. "Rhythm and Blues Alibi"
20. "Split the Difference (Interview)"
