= Five Men in a Hut: A's, B's and Rarities 1998–2004 =

Five Men in a Hut: A's, B's and Rarities

Compilation album by Gomez
- Released: 25 September 2006
- Genre: Rock
- Label: Virgin Records Hut Records
- Producer: Gomez; Tchad Blake

Gomez chronology
How We Operate (2006)	Five Men in a Hut: A's, B's and Rarities (2006)	Five Men In A Hut (DVD) (2006)

Professional ratings
Review scores
Source	Rating
AllMusic	4.5/5 stars
Q	3/5 stars
Record Collector	3/5 stars

Five Men in a Hut is a 2006 compilation album by the British band Gomez. It covers their output from 1998 to 2004 when they were with Virgin Records.

== Track listing ==
Disc 1

1. "Whipping Piccadilly" (Turbo version)
2. "Best In The Town"
3. "Catch Me Up (Edit)"
4. "Pick Up the Pieces"
5. "Royalty"
6. "We Haven't Turned Around"
7. "Coltrane (From Shot Shot, Part 1)"
8. "ZYX"
9. "78 Stone Wobble!"
10. "Flight"
11. "Chicken Bones"
12. "Blind"
13. "Old School Shirt"
14. "Sweet Virginia"
15. "Air Hostess Song"
16. "Ping One Down"
17. "Big Man"
18. "Old China" (Previously unreleased)

Disc 2

1. "Rhythm and Blues Alibi" (Pre-Mellotron version)
2. "Silhouettes"
3. "Dire Tribe"
4. "Bring It On" (Radio edit)
5. "Mississippi Bo Weevil Blues"
6. "Butterfly"
7. "Silence"
8. "Pussyfootin'"
9. "Step Inside"
10. "Shot Shot"
11. "Champagne for Monkeys"
12. "So"
13. "Tanglin'"
14. "Get Myself Arrested"
15. "Sound of Sounds" (Single version)
16. "M57"
17. "Pop Juice"
18. "Diskoloadout" (Previously unreleased)

== Charts ==
Chart (2006)	Peak position
Australian Albums (ARIA Charts)	77
