= Devil Was in My Yard =

Single by The Sleepy Jackson

from the album Personality – One Was a Spider, One Was a Bird
- Released: 25 September 2006
- Recorded: 2006
- Genre: Indie rock
- Length: 3:21
- Label: EMI
- Songwriter: Luke Steele
- Producers: Scott Horscroft, Luke Steele

The Sleepy Jackson singles chronology
"God Lead Your Soul" (2006)	"Devil Was in My Yard" (2006)	"I Understand What You Want But I Just Don't Agree" (2006)

"Devil Was in My Yard" is a song by Australian group The Sleepy Jackson. It was released 25 September 2006, in Australia, as the second and final single from the group's second album Personality – One Was a Spider, One Was a Bird. The music video, released on 31 July, was directed by Sarah-Jane Woulahan and Sean Gilligan (Squareyed Films).

Luke Steele explaining "It was only after I’d worked on the songs for a while that I realized they were all to do with the conflicting sides of my personality. When they first come to me they seem to be about specific incidents to do with our last manager and things in the band going haywire. But after a while they go into another realm. I realised they were more to do with the spiritual conflict between God and the Devil. I surprised myself with how angry and intense they were. But I like that paradox; uplifting tunes with these lyrics about struggle and resolution.”

Steele in an interview in Clash goes onto to state "There's trials and tribulations in the lyrics (but) everyone in life gets thrown every single day; someone's gonna die or someone’s gonna rip your face off. You can’t get through life without these things. It's not like you’ve gotta wait for them, you can't go looking for the devil – you’ll certainly get it."

== Reception ==
The Guardian's Dave Simpson describes "Devil Was in My Yard" as being "a supernaturally catchy alt.pop song." Dan Rapper on PopMatters states that the song "passes by too quickly — it’s not until the second or third listen you hear each layer, the gorgeous melody is uncovered." At Slant Magazine, Preston Jones believes the song "plays around with Issac Brock-worthy lyrical opacity". Kevin Harley in The Independent stating the song was "vivid and exhuberant". Whilst Andy Gill's review was less complimentary, commenting "...as "Devil Was In My Yard" draws to a close, with its inflated folk-rock arrangement streaked with George Harrison-style strokes of slide guitar, it starts to become less mildly intriguing and more mildly irritating.

Keith Phipps of AV Club considers that the song includes "Brian Wilson harmonies, a George Harrison-inspired guitar line, and ... is that just a hint of ELO? It's familiar, but ultimately too inspired to be derivative. Steele has an ear for intriguing combinations of sounds, a voice that sells his conviction, and a keen sense of how much passion can be squeezed into a bouncy pop song."

== Track listing ==
1. "Devil Was in My Yard" – 3:21
2. "Doggytown" – 0:36
3. "Dreams in the Machine" – 0:37
4. "Time" – 1:42
5. "Poison Shoes" – 1:28
6. "Reborn in Science" – 1:01
