= Lovers (The Sleepy Jackson album) =

Studio album by the Sleepy Jackson
- Released: 30 June 2003
- Recorded: 2003
- Genre: Indie rock
- Length: 40:45 (original); 44:53 (international); 48:10 (Japan)
- Label: Capitol
- Producer: Jonathan Burnside

The Sleepy Jackson chronology
Lovers (2003)	Personality – One Was a Spider, One Was a Bird (2006)

Singles from Lovers
- 1. "Vampire Racecourse" Released: 7 July 2003; 2. "Good Dancers" Released: 13 October 2003; 3. "Come to This" Released: 23 February 2004

Professional ratings
Aggregate scores
Source	Rating
Metacritic	79/100
Review scores
Source	Rating
AllMusic	4/5 stars
The Guardian	4/5 stars
Los Angeles Times	3/4 stars
Mojo	3/5 stars
Now	4/5
Pitchfork	6.0/10
Q	4/5 stars
Rolling Stone	4/5 stars
Spin	B+
Uncut	4/5 stars

Lovers is the first album by the Australian band the Sleepy Jackson. The album entered the ARIA Albums Chart at number 21, the UK Albums Chart at number 69 and the French Albums Chart at number 117.

The album was a minor commercial success, selling around 100,000 copies worldwide.

At the ARIA Music Awards of 2003, the album was nominated for four awards.

In October 2010, Lovers was listed in the book, 100 Best Australian Albums.

== Track listing ==
=== Original release ===
1. "Good Dancers" – 4:12
2. "Vampire Racecourse" – 3:10
3. "Rain Falls for Wind" – 4:03
4. "This Day" – 3:48
5. "Acid in My Heart" – 3:31
6. "Fill Me with Apples" – 1:05
7. "Tell the Girls That I'm Not Hangin' Out" – 4:13
8. "Come to This" – 3:28
9. "Morning Bird" – 2:17
10. "Don't You Know" – 5:12
11. "Old Dirt Farmer" – 3:31
12. "Mourning Rain" – 2:06

=== International release ===
1. "Good Dancers" – 4:12
2. "Vampire Racecourse" – 3:10
3. "Rain Falls for Wind" – 4:03
4. "This Day" – 3:48
5. "Acid in My Heart" – 3:31
6. "Fill Me with Apples" – 1:05
7. "Tell the Girls That I'm Not Hangin' Out" – 4:13
8. "Come to This" – 3:28
9. "Miniskirt" (bonus track) – 4:08
10. "Morning Bird" – 2:17
11. "Don't You Know" – 5:12
12. "Old Dirt Farmer" – 3:31
13. "Mourning Rain" – 2:06
14. "Sunkids" (Japan-only bonus track) – 3:17

== Charts ==
=== Weekly charts ===
Chart (2003)	Peak position
Australian Albums (ARIA)	21
French Albums (SNEP)	117
United Kingdom (OCC)	69

== Certifications ==
Region	Certification	Certified units/sales
Australia (ARIA)	Gold	35,000^{‡}
^{‡} Sales+streaming figures based on certification alone.
