= Tom Gray (activist) =

British musician

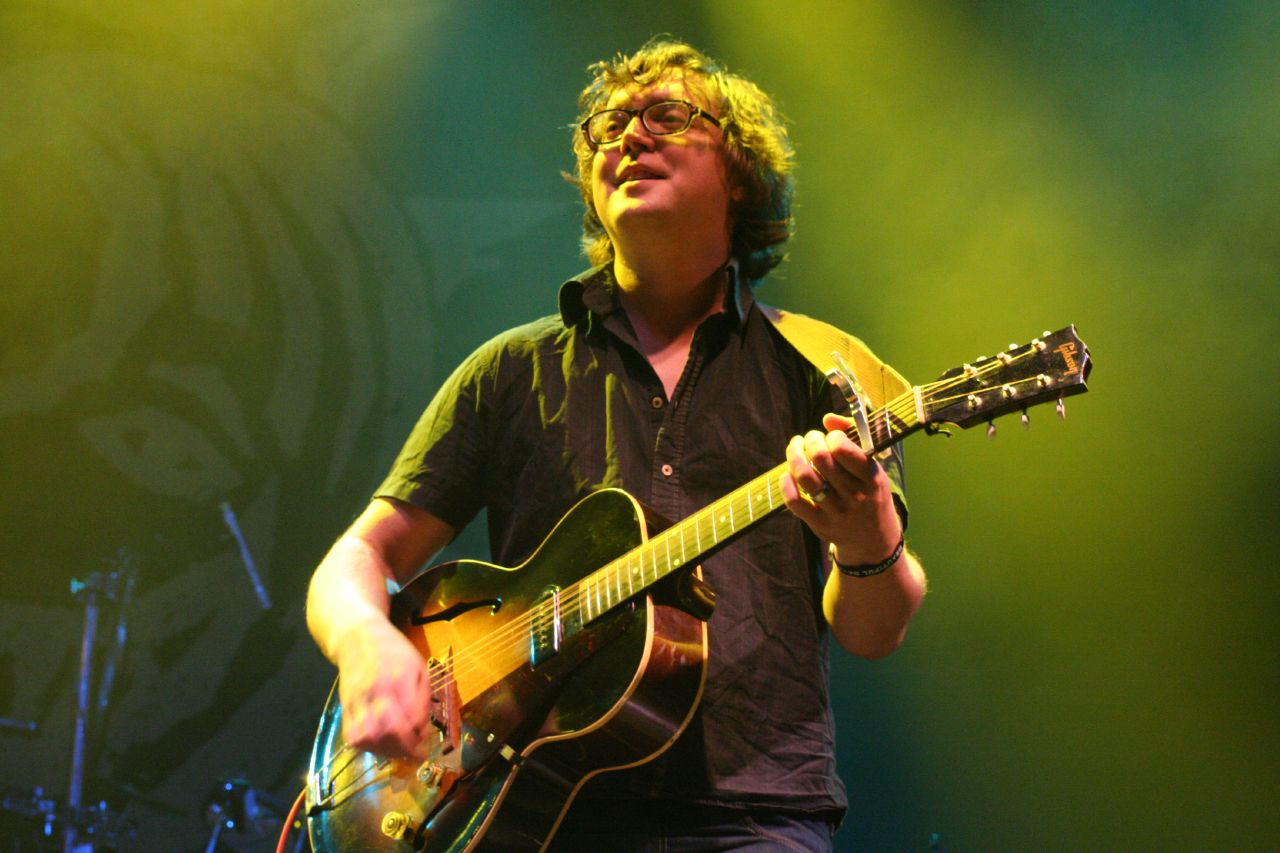
- Gray performing with Gomez in 2006
- Born: 1 January 1977 (age 49); Southport, Merseyside, England
- Occupations: Musician, composer and activist
- Known for: Gomez, The Broken Record campaign, political and creator activism.
- Notable work: Bring It On (Album, 1998)
- Political party: Labour

Tom Gray (born 1 January 1977) is a Mercury Prize-winning British songwriter, composer, and activist.

== Early ==
He was born on 1 January 1977 in Southport. He became a founding member of the rock band Gomez, the founder of the Broken Record campaign. and the elected Chair of the Ivors Academy. He is an elected Council Member of PRS For Music and sits on the board of UK Music. He is a UK Labour Party activist based in Brighton & Hove, and a member of the Musicians' Union.

== Musical work ==
Gray is a founding member and one of three vocalists in the UK indie rock band Gomez. With Gomez, he won the Mercury Prize in 1998. In 2016 their winning album, Bring It On, was voted BBC Radio 6 Music listeners' favourite ever Mercury winner to date. The band went on to enjoy five UK Top 40 albums.

As a composer, Gray has worked in film, theatre and television. He wrote the score for the first season of In My Skin, a comedy-drama series on the BBC and Hulu. He has also composed for the adaptation of Danny Champion of the World as a stage musical.

He was the recipient of the 2022 Unsung Hero Award presented by the Music Producer’s Guild UK.

== Activism ==
With the band, Gray made one of the first attempts at completely carbon-neutral touring in 2006 and is a signatory to the 'Music Declares Emergency' climate declaration.

He founded the Broken Record campaign in March 2020 to seek fairer remuneration for music creators, especially from streaming. The campaign helped to initiate a UK parliamentary inquiry into the 'Economics of streaming'. In April 2021, Gray wrote a letter to the British Prime Minister Boris Johnson, requesting better rights for creators and for the industry to be referred to the UK Competition and Markets Authority. The letter was co-signed by other 200 notable individuals in UK music industry, including The Rolling Stones, Paul McCartney, Kate Bush and Chris Martin.

In February 2021, Gray was elected as the Chair of the Ivors Academy, the British association of songwriters and composers. He led several campaigns through the academy, which has resulted in an international conversation around reform of the streaming market. He is also an elected Council Member of the Performing Rights Society.

Gray's campaigning provided impetus for the creation of the "Brennan Bill", a bill brought by to the UK Parliament by the Member of Parliament for Cardiff West, Kevin Brennan to improve pay and conditions for working British musicians.

On 9 June 2022, Gray was awarded the Unsung Hero Award by the Music Producers Guild UK.

In response to the "Brennan Bill", the UK Government instigated the "Creator Remuneration Working Group" which, in 2025, set out agreed new principles for record labels to adhere to. In his role as Chair of the Ivors Academy, attending this working group, Tom successfully agreed 'Per diem' payments for UK songwriters working in Major Label sessions, a concept he had originated.

== Politics ==
Gray beat Eddie Izzard to become the Labour Party candidate for Brighton Pavilion in the 2024 general election but failed to win the seat, taking 27.7% of the vote against 55% for Siân Berry, the winning Green candidate. He increased Labour's share of the vote by 5.1% relative to the party's performance in 2019.
