= Abandoned Shopping Trolley Hotline =

Compilation album by Gomez
- Released: 25 September 2000
- Genre: Rock
- Length: 49:34
- Label: Hut (Virgin)
- Producer: Gomez

Gomez chronology
Machismo E.P. (2000)	Abandoned Shopping Trolley Hotline (2000)	In Our Gun (2002)

Professional ratings
Aggregate scores
Source	Rating
Metacritic	74/100
Review scores
Source	Rating
AllMusic	4/5 stars
Entertainment Weekly	B+
Q	4/5 stars
Rolling Stone	2.5/5 stars
Wall of Sound	78/100

Abandoned Shopping Trolley Hotline is a 2000 compilation of previously unreleased material, including BBC Radio 1 studio sessions, outtakes and B-sides by UK band Gomez. Some of the tracks foreshadow the band's move into electronic-based music on 2002's In Our Gun.

== Track listing ==
1. "Shitbag 9" – 0:30
2. "Bring Your Lovin' Back Here" – 3:36
3. "Emergency Surgery" – 3:04
4. "Hit on the Head" – 1:25
5. "Flavors" (mat turner) – 3:12
6. "78 Stone Shuffle" – 3:27
7. "We Haven't Turned Around (X-Ray Mix)" – 3:18
8. "Buena Vista" – 8:59
9. "Shitbag" – 1:03
10. "Steve McCroski" – 4:34
11. "Wharf Me" – 3:21
12. "High on Liquid Skin" – 2:22
13. "Rosemary" – 5:50
14. "The Cowboy Song" – 1:17
15. "Getting Better" (Lennon–McCartney) – 3:48
