= A New Tide =

Studio album by Gomez
- Released: 28 March 2009
- Genre: Indie rock
- Label: ATO Records
- Producers: Gomez; Brian Deck

Gomez chronology
Five Men In A Hut (DVD) (2006)	A New Tide (2009)	Whatever's on Your Mind (2011)

Professional ratings
Aggregate scores
Source	Rating
Metacritic	61/100
Review scores
Source	Rating
AllMusic	3.5/5 stars
The Austin Chronicle	2/5 stars
The A.V. Club	B−
The Guardian	2/5 stars
Pitchfork Media	5.4/10
Paste	8.1/10

A New Tide is the sixth studio album by the English indie rock band Gomez released on 30 March 2009 by ATO Records. The album was produced by the band as well as Brian Deck and received average reviews from music critics.

== Reception ==
Initial critical response to A New Tide was generally average. At Metacritic, which assigns a normalized rating out of 100 to reviews from mainstream critics, the album has received a score of 61, based on 17 reviews.

The album debuted at number 60 on the Billboard 200, selling 10,000 copies in its first week.

== Track listing ==
All tracks by Gomez except where noted

1. "Mix" – 4:16
2. "Little Pieces" – 3:24
3. "If I Ask You Nicely" – 3:07
4. "Lost Track" – 4:00
5. "Win Park Slope" – 4:20
6. "Bone Tired" – 2:17
7. "Airstream Driver" (Gomez, Hurley, Tim Rutili) – 3:56
8. "Natural Reaction" – 4:16
9. "Very Strange" – 4:43
10. "Other Plans" – 4:24
11. "Sunset Gates" – 4:58

== Personnel ==
- Ian Ball – vocals, guitar
- Ben Ottewell – vocals, guitar
- Paul Blackburn – bass
- Tom Gray – vocals, guitar, keyboards
- Olly Peacock – drums, synths, computers
