= Who Goes There (album) =

Studio album by Ian Ball
- Released: 30 October 2007

Professional ratings
Review scores
Source	Rating
Allmusic	4/5 stars

Who Goes There is the debut solo album by Gomez singer and guitarist Ian Ball, released on October 30, 2007.

== Track listing ==
1. "Sweet Sweet Sleep" - 5:14
2. "Automatic Message" - 3:26
3. "Failure" - 3:25
4. "Your Move" - 4:59
5. "The Elephant Pharmacy" - 3:53
6. "Free Tickets To The Moon" - 0:52
7. "Who Goes There" - 10:10
8. "When We Were Cool" - 2:43
9. "Batteries" - 1:26
10. "I Knew You Were Trouble" - 3:43
11. "Enzymes" - 5:26

Failure and Elephant Pharmacy both featured on Operation Aloha's self-titled debut album, for whom Ian Ball was lead vocalist.
