= Whatever's on Your Mind =

Studio album by Gomez
- Released: 3 June 2011
- Genre: Indie rock
- Label: ATO Records
- Producers: Gomez; Brian Deck

Gomez chronology
A New Tide (2009)	Whatever's on Your Mind (2011)

Professional ratings
Aggregate scores
Source	Rating
Metacritic	56/100
Review scores
Source	Rating
AllMusic	3.5/5 stars
Austin Chronicle	2/5 stars
Paste	(7.3/10)
Pitchfork	(2.9/10)
PopMatters	2/10 stars
Slant Magazine	3/5 stars
Spin	(6/10)

Whatever's on Your Mind is the seventh studio album by English indie rock band Gomez released on 6 June 2011 by ATO Records. As with their last album, production on Whatever's on Your Mind was overseen by the band as well as Brian Deck, known for his work on albums from bands such as Modest Mouse, Counting Crows and Iron & Wine. The album was met with wildly mixed reviews, and was panned by Popmatters and Pitchfork.

== Track listing ==
All tracks by Gomez except where noted

1. "Options"
2. "I Will Take You There "
3. "Whatever's on Your Mind"
4. "Just as Lost as You"
5. "The Place and the People"
6. "Our Goodbye"
7. "Song in My Heart"
8. "Equalize"
9. "That Wolf"
10. "X-Rays"

== Personnel ==
- Ian Ball – vocals, guitar
- Ben Ottewell – vocals, guitar
- Paul Blackburn – bass
- Tom Gray – vocals, guitar, keyboards
- Olly Peacock – drums, synths, computers
