= The Sleepy Jackson =

Australian alternative rock band

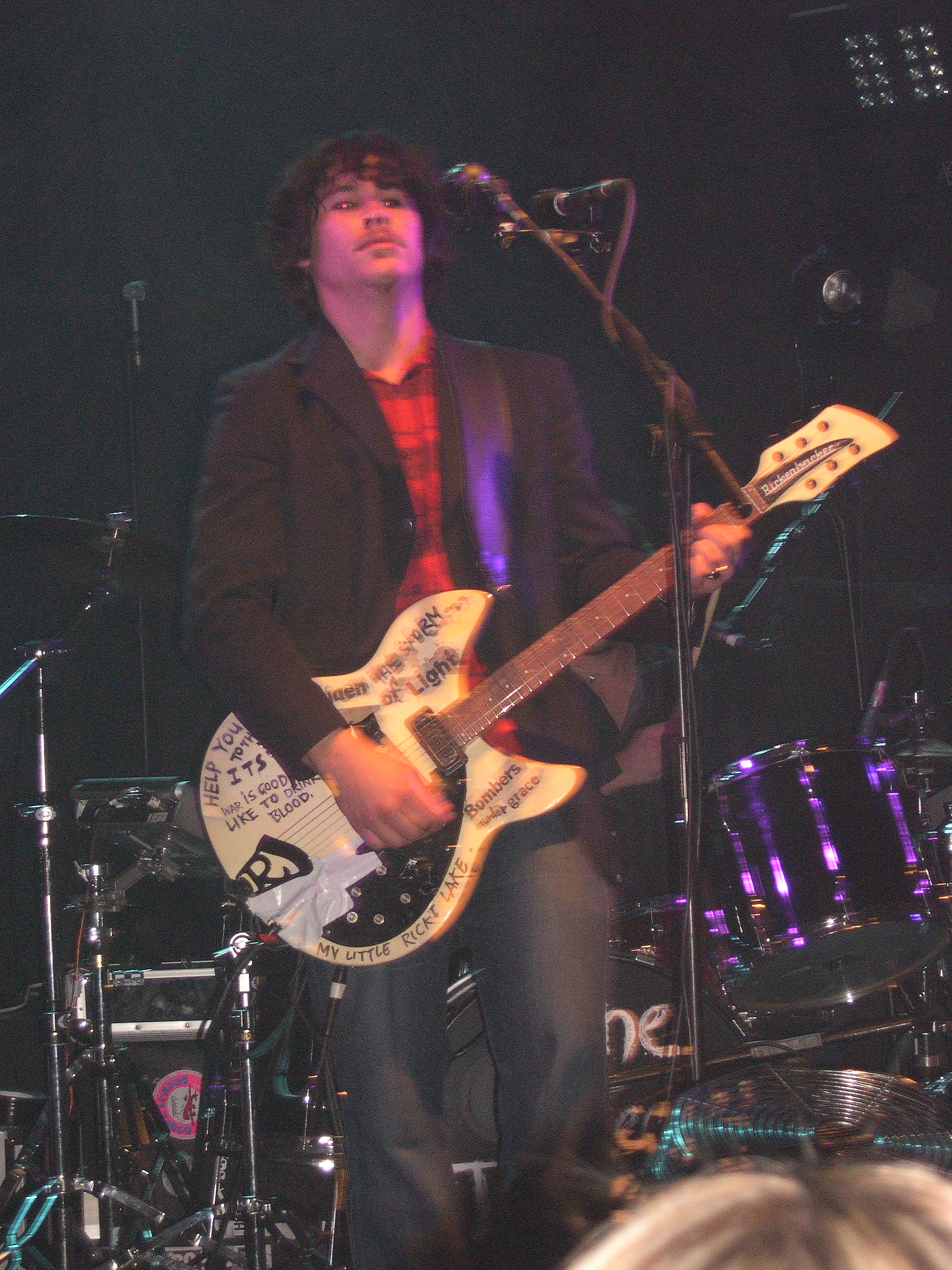
- Front-man Luke Steele performing live with the band in 2003

Background information
- Origin: Perth, Western Australia, Australia
- Genres: Alternative rock, baroque pop, power pop
- Years active: 1998–2008
- Labels: Capitol (Australia); Virgin (UK); Astralwerks (USA)
- Spinoffs: Empire of the Sun, End of Fashion
- Past members: Luke Steele; Malcolm Clark; Lee Jones; Dave Symes; Jake Steele; Jodi Steele; Jesse Steele; Matthew O'Connor (deceased); Dan Bull; Adam Buckeridge; Paul Keenan; Ronan Charles; Justin Burford; Rodney Aravena; Jonathon Dudman; Ben Nightingale; Julian Dudman; Felix Bloxsom

The Sleepy Jackson were an Australian alternative rock band formed in Perth, Western Australia. The band's name was inspired by a former drummer, who was narcoleptic. The band revolved around the distinctive vocal style of multi-instrumentalist and songwriter Luke Steele. Stemming from a musical family, Luke's father Rick Steele was a local blues musician, and two of Luke's siblings are also musicians, with brother Jesse a former member of The Sleepy Jackson and Rick's Hot Biscuit Band, and sister Katy, who fronts another Perth rock band, Little Birdy. While a series of acclaimed EPs brought The Sleepy Jackson to prominence in Australia, it was the release of their 2003 album Lovers and 2006 second album Personality – One Was a Spider, One Was a Bird that directed significant international focus upon the band.

== History ==
=== 1998–2002 : Formation and early EP ===
The Sleepy Jackson formed in 1998 with the original lineup featuring Luke Steele (vocals and guitars), Jesse Steele (drums), and Matthew O'Connor (bass). This lineup recorded a self-titled debut EP and a subsequent single titled "Miniskirt." Both recordings were independently released. Dan Bull joined the lineup in 1999 as the band's first live keyboard player (who later played keys with Eskimo Joe at their live performances).

In 2000, as a result of non-musical commitments, Luke suggested that his brother should redirect his attentions and concentrate on other happenings in his life which ultimately resulted in Jesse following his advice and departing the band.

The void created by Jesse Steele's departure was filled by Paul Keenan (who later drummed with Eskimo Joe at their live performances). Along with numerous shows in their hometown of Perth, in late 2000 The Sleepy Jackson toured nationally with Jebediah. In March 2001, on the eve of the band's signing with EMI Records, the band toured with Magic Dirt and Motor Ace with Ronan Charles on keyboards joining Steele, O'Connor and Keenan. Five weeks into the tour, with the band broke, exhausted, and sleeping in caravan parks rather than enjoying the luxuries their touring partners were enjoying, O'Connor, Keenan and Charles quit, leaving Luke Steele to complete the tour solo.

Upon signing to EMI in 2000, pressure was soon placed on Steele to produce a recording. The result was the 2001 EP titled Caffeine in the Morning Sun, which Steele recorded in Sydney with a collection of session musicians. In addition to playing solo, Steele recruited drummer Malcolm Clark into The Sleepy Jackson fold and, when some serious touring was required in support of the release, the services of Justin Burford (guitar) and Rodney Aravena (bass) were enlisted. In addition to The Sleepy Jackson, Steele's three colleagues were also playing around their hometown with Jonathon Dudman under the name End of Fashion.

The Sleepy Jackson relocated to Sydney, where they recorded another EP, Let Your Love Be Love, in late 2002. Songs from this EP and Caffeine in the Morning Sun were compiled together to form a self-titled mini-album for release in the UK market in February 2003. A period of extensive touring quickly followed, which saw the band playing in Australia, the United States, and Europe. The latter brought the band some very enthusiastic attention from UK music magazine NME.

=== 2003–2005: Lovers ===
In between live appearances, The Sleepy Jackson worked on recordings that were to become their debut album Lovers, which was released in June 2003. During a series of UK appearances in 2003, Burford and Aravena left the band. With a support slot for Silverchair's Diorama tour looming back in Australia, replacements were quickly sought. Clarke called upon the only other End of Fashion member not previously part of The Sleepy Jackson, Jonathon Dudman.

Dudman joined the band in Sydney, where he took over bass duties, and the second guitarist position was filled by session musician Ben Nightingale. The Sleepy Jackson's revolving door continued when Nightingale was ultimately replaced by Jonathon Dudman's brother, Julian Dudman. But the Dudmans subsequently left the band, leaving Luke Steele and Malcolm Clark as the only official members of The Sleepy Jackson.

In 2005, singer-songwriter Ben Lee referenced The Sleepy Jackson in his hit song "Catch My Disease".

=== 2006–2007: Personality – One Was a Spider, One Was a Bird ===
The Sleepy Jackson released their second studio album Personality – One Was a Spider, One Was a Bird in Australia on 1 July 2006, where it debuted at number 10 on the Australian Albums Chart the following week. Later that July, the album was nominated for a J Awards. The band supported the new album's worldwide release with a series of live appearances in select markets. Joining Steele and Clark were Dave Symes and Felix Bloxsom, who both worked on the album, and Lee Jones who was formerly in the Perth band Spencer Tracy. Bloxsom has since been replaced by Luke's brother Jake and Luke's wife Jodi, a.k.a. "Snappy Dolphin," which also brought a change from organic percussion instruments to computer samples backing the band.

In 2007, The Sleepy Jackson performed at the 2007 Big Day Out, the Southbound festival, the Falls Festival and the St. Jerome's Laneway festivals in Melbourne, Sydney, and Brisbane. Also in 2007, Steele provided slide guitar to the song "Waiting All Day" by Silverchair on their fifth album Young Modern. Steele also appeared on the Pnau single "With You Forever," leading Nick Littlemore to state on Pnau's website that "working with Luke Steele... was amazing, that inspired [me] to work on a separate project with him all together. It's another album we're doing."

The Sleepy Jackson contributed to Yoko Ono's album Yes, I'm a Witch, in 2007 with a remix of the song "I'm Moving On".

=== 2008 onwards ===
Following the completion of touring for the second album, the band fell into a permanent state of inactivity and their website fell into dormancy. In late May 2013, as part of an interview for the second Empire of the Sun album Ice on the Dune, Steele revealed that a third Sleepy Jackson album was heard by the band's record label but a lack of subsequent interest meant that it was never released. Steele stated that he intended to release the third album prior to 2023, and that a release date during 2013 was highly unlikely. This, however, never eventuated.

== Side projects ==
In 2004, Steele, along with Edo Khan and Nadav Khan from Gelbison released an album as Nations by the River. Sarah Blasko also contributed to the album, which was recorded in three days.

In late 2007, Steele formed the electropop duo Empire of the Sun with Littlemore. Empire of the Sun released its debut album Walking on a Dream, in addition to two single releases, "Walking on a Dream" and "We Are the People". The project gained success in Australia, New Zealand, the United Kingdom (UK), Ireland and some parts of Europe in 2008. At the 2009 Australian Recording Industry Association Music (ARIA) Awards, Empire of the Sun received four awards: "Best Group", "Album of the Year", "Single of the Year" and "Best Pop Release".

In May 2013, Steele stated he was completing a recording project commenced with Daniel Johns at his Newcastle, Australia studio in 2008. In a 2013 interview, Steele explained: "Me and Daniel Johns have been in the studio working on our record, and we’re just about ready to try and finish that off. The sessions we did lately sound a bit like The Clash, Talking Heads … inspired by African music. So it's going to be good to do some tougher, hard-edged kind of stuff.” In 2008 the name of the project was "Hathaway and Palmer", according to a radio interview that Steele conducted, but was later confirmed to be Dreams. Their only album, No One Defeats Us, was ultimately released in 2018.

In early 2009, Clark joined The Exploders, a Melbourne-based band, whose members include former Sleepy Jackson bassist Jonathon Dudman (aka J. Cortez). In 2010, Clark and Dudman joined Jeff Martin of The Tea Party in a new band, Jeff Martin 777; the band released its debut album The Ground Cries Out in early 2011.

Clark spent time as drummer in the touring band of Australian singer-songwriter Kevin Mitchell, playing under the name Bob Evans. Clark joined Mitchell during the tours for the albums Goodnight, Bull Creek! and Familiar Stranger. He later semi-retired from performing music, becoming involved with tour management and audio-visual production.

== Members ==
=== Final line-up ===
- Luke Steele – lead vocals, guitar (1998–2008)
- Malcolm Clark – drums, backing vocals (2001–2008)
- Lee Jones – guitar, keyboards, backing vocals (2006–2008)
- Dave Symes – bass, backing vocals (2006–2008)
- Jake Steele – sampler (2007–2008)
- Jodi "Snappy Dolphin" Steele – sampler (2007–2008)

=== Past members ===
- Jesse Steele – drums (1998–2000)
- Matt O'Connor – bass (1998–2001; died 2007)
- Dan Bull – keyboards (1999–2001)
- Paul Keenan – drums (2000–2002)
- Ronan Charles – keyboards (2001)
- Justin Burford – guitar (2001–2004)
- Rodney Aravena – bass (2001–2004)
- Ben Nightingale – guitar (2003)
- Jonathan Dudman (aka J. Cortez) – bass (2003–2005)
- Julian Dudman (aka Jules Cortez) – guitar (2004–2005)
- Felix Bloxsom – percussion, acoustic guitar, synthesizer (2006–2008)

== Discography ==
=== Studio albums ===
Title	Details	Peak chart positions				Certifications
Title	Details	AUS	FRA	SWE	UK	Certifications
Lovers	Released: 30 June 2003; Label: Capitol Records (5 90490); Format: CD, digital download, LP	23	117	—	69	ARIA: Gold
Personality – One Was a Spider, One Was a Bird	Released: July 2006; Label: Capitol Records (3 63929); Format: CD, digital download, LP	10	183	42	—	

=== EPs ===
Title	Details
The Sleepy Jackson EP (a.k.a. Glasshouses)	Released: 1999; Label: The Sleepy Jackson; Format: CD, digital download
Miniskirt	Released: 2000; Label: The Sleepy Jackson; Format: CD, digital download
Caffeine in the Morning Sun	Released: November 2001; Label: Capitol Records (50104 2); Format: CD, digital download
Let Your Love Be Love	Released: November 2002; Label: Capitol Records (51169 2); Format: CD, digital download

=== Compilations ===
Title	Details
Heart (a.k.a. The Sleepy Jackson)	Released: 2002; Label: Capitol Records (V 2968); Format: 2xLP, CD, digital download

=== Singles ===
Title	Year	Peak chart positions		Album
Title	Year	AUS	UK	Album
"Vampire Racecourse"	2003	71	50	Lovers
"Good Dancers"	2003	—	71	Lovers
"This Day"/"Come to This"	2004	95	—	Lovers
"God Lead Your Soul"	2006	25	69	Personality – One Was a Spider, One Was a Bird
"Devil Was in My Yard"	2006	—	—	Personality – One Was a Spider, One Was a Bird
"I Understand What You Want but I Just Don't Agree"	2006	—	—	Personality – One Was a Spider, One Was a Bird

== Awards and nominations ==
=== ARIA Awards ===
The ARIA Music Awards is an annual awards ceremony that recognises excellence, innovation, and achievement across all genres of Australian music.

Year	Nominee / work	Award	Result
2003	Lovers	Album of the Year	Nominated
2003	Lovers	Breakthrough Artist – Album	Nominated
2003	Lovers	Best Rock Album	Nominated
2003	"Vampire Racecourse"	Breakthrough Artist – Single	Nominated
2003	Jonathan Burnside for Lovers	Producer of the Year	Nominated
2004	"Good Dancers" (directed by Nash Edgerton)	Best Video	Nominated
2006	Personality – One Was a Spider, One Was a Bird	Album of the Year	Nominated
2006	Luke Steele, James Bellesini, Love Police for Personality – One Was a Spider, One Was a Bird	Best Cover Art	Nominated

=== J Awards ===
The J Awards are an annual series of Australian music awards that were established by the Australian Broadcasting Corporation's youth-focused radio station Triple J. They commenced in 2005.

Year	Nominee / work	Award	Result
2006	Personality – One Was a Spider, One Was a Bird	Australian Album of the Year	Nominated

=== West Australian Music Industry Awards ===
The Western Australian Music Industry Awards (commonly known as WAMis) are annual awards presented to the local contemporary music industry, put on by the Western Australian Music Industry Association Inc (WAM). The Sleepy Jackson have won two awards.

Year	Nominee / work	Award	Result (wins only)
2001	The Sleepy Jackson	Most Popular Original Country Act	Won
2003	Let Your Love Be Love	Most Popular Local Original Single or EP	Won
