= Bring It On (Gomez album) =

Studio album by Gomez
- Released: 13 April 1998
- Recorded: 1997–1998
- Genre: Indie rock; roots rock
- Length: 54:06
- Label: Hut
- Producer: Gomez

Gomez chronology
Bring It On (1998)	Liquid Skin (1999)

Bring It On is the debut album by English indie rock band Gomez, released on 13 April 1998 by Hut Records. Recording sessions for the album began in late 1997, during which time Gomez also toured the United Kingdom with Embrace. The first single, "78 Stone Wobble", was released in March 1998, while "Get Myself Arrested" and "Whippin' Piccadilly" were later released as singles.

Bring It On experienced a boost in popularity when it won the 1998 Mercury Music Prize, beating favourites such as Massive Attack's Mezzanine and The Verve's Urban Hymns. Gomez later toured the United States as the support artist for Eagle-Eye Cherry.

A 10th anniversary 2-CD edition of Bring It On was released in 2008. As of September 2020, the album has sold 502,000 copies in the UK.

"Bring It On" is also the name of a song on Gomez's following album, Liquid Skin.

== Critical reception ==
Professional ratings
Review scores
Source	Rating
AllMusic	4/5 stars
Encyclopedia of Popular Music	3/5 stars
Entertainment Weekly	B+
Mojo	4/5 stars
NME	9/10
PopMatters	9/10
Record Collector	3/5 stars
Rolling Stone	2.5/5 stars
The Rolling Stone Album Guide	3/5 stars
Spin	8/10

Bring It On was released to critical acclaim. Contemporary critics praised Gomez's ability to "play the blues as though they were from the Deep South" despite the band members' young ages and English origins, according to The Independent's John O'Reilly, with the band being compared to numerous American artists. NME critic Steve Sutherland described it as "one of the most assured, poised, hilarious, out-there, plain don't-give-a-fuck enjoyable debut albums in living memory". Bring It On was awarded the 1998 Mercury Music Prize, beating out bookmakers' favourites The Verve.

The album likewise drew praise from American publications. AllMusic's Greg Prato was impressed by the band's ability to "cover a lot of ground convincingly" on a debut album, concluding that "the praise [it] received is definitely not hype". David Stubbs of Spin wrote that it transcends pastiche to become a successful "product of '90s simultaneism—these days, musics from different eras and places are all equally accessible and therefore all equally contemporary... a damn beautiful record". Critic Robert Christgau gave the album a three-star honourable mention rating, naming "Whippin' Piccadilly" and "Love Is Better Than a Warm Trombone" as highlights and quipping, "Really the roots-rock—they mean it, man". Neva Chonin of Rolling Stone was more critical, finding that the band "excels in sonic mimicry" but lacks a distinct musical identity.

In 2000 it was voted number 372 in Colin Larkin's All Time Top 1000 Albums. He stated "For once, clever inventive music got out of the cult box and into the heart and soul of the record buying public".

== Track listing ==
All tracks written by Ball/Blackburn/Gray/Ottewell/Peacock.

No.	Title	Length
1.	"Get Miles"	5:16
2.	"Whippin' Picadilly"	3:12
3.	"Make No Sound"	3:26
4.	"78 Stone Wobble"	4:22
5.	"Tijuana Lady"	7:08
6.	"Here Comes the Breeze"	5:29
7.	"Love is Better Than a Warm Trombone"	3:29
8.	"Get Myself Arrested"	4:03
9.	"Free To Run"	4:31
10.	"Bubble Gum Years"	3:20
11.	"Rie's Wagon"	9:07
12.	"The Comeback"	0:44
Total length:		54:25

Tenth anniversary CD bonus tracks

No.	Title	Writer(s)	Length
1.	"Here Comes the Breeze" (BBC Session 4 Apr 1998)		6:09
2.	"Brother Lead" (BBC Session 4 Apr 1998)		4:38
3.	"78 Stone Shuffle" (BBC Session 4 Apr 1998)		3:27
4.	"The Way You Do The Things You Do" (BBC Session 4 Apr 1998)	Smokey Robinson	3:03
5.	"Stag O' Lee" (BBC Session 24 Aug 1998)	traditional	2:58
6.	"Whippin' Piccadilly" (BBC Session 24 Aug 1998)		3:15
7.	"Rie's Wagon" (BBC Session 24 Aug 1998)		5:30
8.	"Who's Gonna Go The Bar"		5:06
9.	"Steve McCroski"		4:06
10.	"Wham Bam"		3:04
11.	"Flavors"		3:18
12.	"Old School Shirt"		3:32
13.	"The Cowboy Song"		1:17
14.	"Whippin' Piccadilly" (Turbo Version)		3:19
15.	"Pussyfootin'"		3:53
16.	"Pick Up The Pieces"		5:28
Total length:			54:25

== Personnel ==
Gomez

- Ian Ball – vocals, guitar
- Ben Ottewell – vocals, guitar
- Paul Blackburn – bass
- Tom Gray – vocals, guitar, keyboards
- Olly Peacock – drums, synths, computers

Additional musicians

- Mat Quinton – tuba on "Get Miles"
- Ian Bracken – cello on "Make No Sound"
- Susie Wright – saxophone on "78 Stone Wobble"
- Steve Fellows – fuzz guitar on "Love Is Better Than a Warm Trombone"

== Charts ==
=== Weekly charts ===
Chart (1998–2000)	Peak position
Scottish Albums (OCC)	18
UK Albums (OCC)	11

=== Year-end charts ===
Chart (1998)	Position
UK Albums (OCC)	72
Chart (1999)	Position
UK Albums (OCC)	74
