= JSLA =

The Junior Sport Leadership Award was a qualification run in the United Kingdom by the British Sports Trust, the operating name of Sports Leaders UK.
