= How We Operate =

Studio album by Gomez
- Released: 2 May 2006
- Recorded: RAK Studios, London
- Genre: Rock
- Length: 51:40
- Label: ATO Records
- Producer: Gomez; Gil Norton

Gomez chronology
Out West (2005)	How We Operate (2006)	Five Men in a Hut (2006)

Professional ratings
Aggregate scores
Source	Rating
Metacritic	70/100
Review scores
Source	Rating
AllMusic	4/5 stars
Entertainment Weekly	B+
The Guardian	3/5 stars
The Independent	3/5 stars
Pitchfork Media	5.1/10
Stylus	A−

How We Operate is the fifth studio album by the English indie rock band Gomez released in May 2006 by ATO Records. Production on the album was overseen by the band as well as Gil Norton, known for his work on albums by artists such as Pixies, Foo Fighters and Pere Ubu. Recorded at RAK Studios in London, How We Operate received generally favourable reviews from music critics.

== Track listing ==
1. "Notice" – 4:01
2. "See the World" – 4:03
3. "How We Operate" – 5:26
4. "Hamoa Beach" – 3:34
5. "Girlshapedlovedrug" – 4:00
6. "Chasing Ghosts with Alcohol" – 3:42
7. "Tear Your Love Apart" – 4:06
8. "Charley Patton Songs" – 5:13
9. "Woman! Man!" – 4:05
10. "All Too Much" – 4:33
11. "Cry on Demand" – 4:22
12. "Don't Make Me Laugh" – 4:34
