= Machismo E.P. =

EP by Gomez
- Released: 1 May 2000
- Recorded: Real World Studios, Bath, January 2000
- Length: 26:51
- Label: Hut (Virgin)

Gomez chronology
Liquid Skin (1999)	Machismo E.P. (2000)	Abandoned Shopping Trolley Hotline (2000)

Machismo E.P. is a 5 track EP by British rock band Gomez, released in 2000 on Hut/Virgin Records. Recorded at Real World Studios in Bath, England, Machismo E.P. was originally an individual release, but is often included as a bonus disc with special pressings of the 2000 b-sides compilation Abandoned Shopping Trolley Hotline or the earlier album Liquid Skin.

The track "Machismo" contains a sample from David Blaine's television special Street Magic. This song is included in the soundtrack for the 2000 film Gone in 60 Seconds.

== Track listing ==
1. "Machismo" – 3:36
2. "Dos and Don'ts" – 2:08
3. "Touchin' Up" – 4:35
4. "Waster" – 3:03
5. "The Dajon Song" – 13:28

== Charts ==
Chart (2000)	Peak position
Australia (ARIA Charts)	48
