= Split the Difference =

Studio album by Gomez
- Released: 17 May 2004
- Genre: Rock
- Length: 50:30
- Label: Hut (Virgin)
- Producers: Gomez; Tchad Blake

Gomez chronology
In Our Gun (2002)	Split the Difference (2004)	Out West (2005)

Singles from Split the Difference
- 1. "Catch Me Up" Released: March 8th, 2004; 2. "Silence" Released: May 10th, 2005; 3. "Sweet Virginia" Released: August 30th, 2005

Split the Difference is the fourth studio album by English indie rock band Gomez released on 17 May 2004 by Hut Records. Production on the album was overseen by the band and Tchad Blake, known for producing albums by artists such as Tom Waits and Crowded House.

== Reception ==
Professional ratings
Aggregate scores
Source	Rating
Metacritic	71/100
Review scores
Source	Rating
Allmusic	4/5 stars
The A.V. Club	favourable
Entertainment Weekly	B
The Guardian	4/5 stars
NME	3/10
The Observer	unfavourable
Pitchfork Media	5.7/10
PopMatters	favourable
Q	3/5 stars
Rolling Stone	3/5 stars

The album was met with mixed critical response, with Allmusic rating it as four stars out of five and BBC Internet Music Reviews describing it as "one of the finest releases of the year so far. If you were one of those people who wrote them off two years ago, it's time to get listening again." However, the album received less than favourable reviews from a number of other sources, including Pitchfork Media and NME.

== Track listing ==
1. "Do One" – 2:40
2. "These 3 Sins" – 2:37
3. "Silence" – 2:55
4. "Me, You and Everybody" – 4:24
5. "We Don't Know Where We're Going" – 4:42
6. "Sweet Virginia" – 6:06
7. "Catch Me Up" – 3:47
8. "Where Ya Going?" – 3:41
9. "Meet Me in the City" – 3:12
10. "Chicken Out" – 3:32
11. "Extra Special Guy" – 3:31
12. "Nothing Is Wrong" – 5:35
13. "There It Was" – 3:43
14. "Blind" – 4:18 (bonus track on some versions)
15. "Butterfly" – 3:44 (bonus track on some versions)

== Singles ==
- "Catch Me Up" (1 March 2004) #36 UK
- "Silence" (3 May 2004) #41 UK
- "Sweet Virginia" (6 September 2004)
