= Ian Ball =

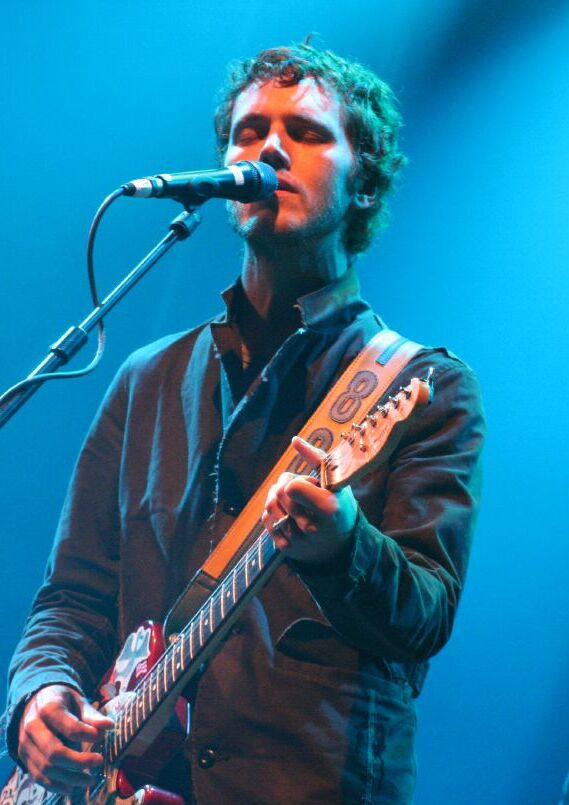
- Ian Ball, in 2006

Background information
- Born: Ian Thomas Ball; 19 October 1975 (age 51); Southport, Merseyside, England
- Genres: Indie rock, alternative rock
- Occupations: Musician, songwriter, record producer
- Instruments: Vocals, Guitar
- Years active: 1990–present
- Member of: Gomez

Ian Thomas Ball (born 19 October 1975) is an English musician, most notable for being part of the indie rock band Gomez, sharing lead vocals and guitars. He has also performed and released two solo albums (as of June 2017). He is also a member of the 14-piece supergroup Operation Aloha, along with fellow Gomez member Olly Peacock Bell is also a touring member of Australian indie band Empire of the Sun.

== Discography ==
- Who Goes There (2007)
- Unfold Yourself (2013)
