= Gomez (band) =

English indie rock band

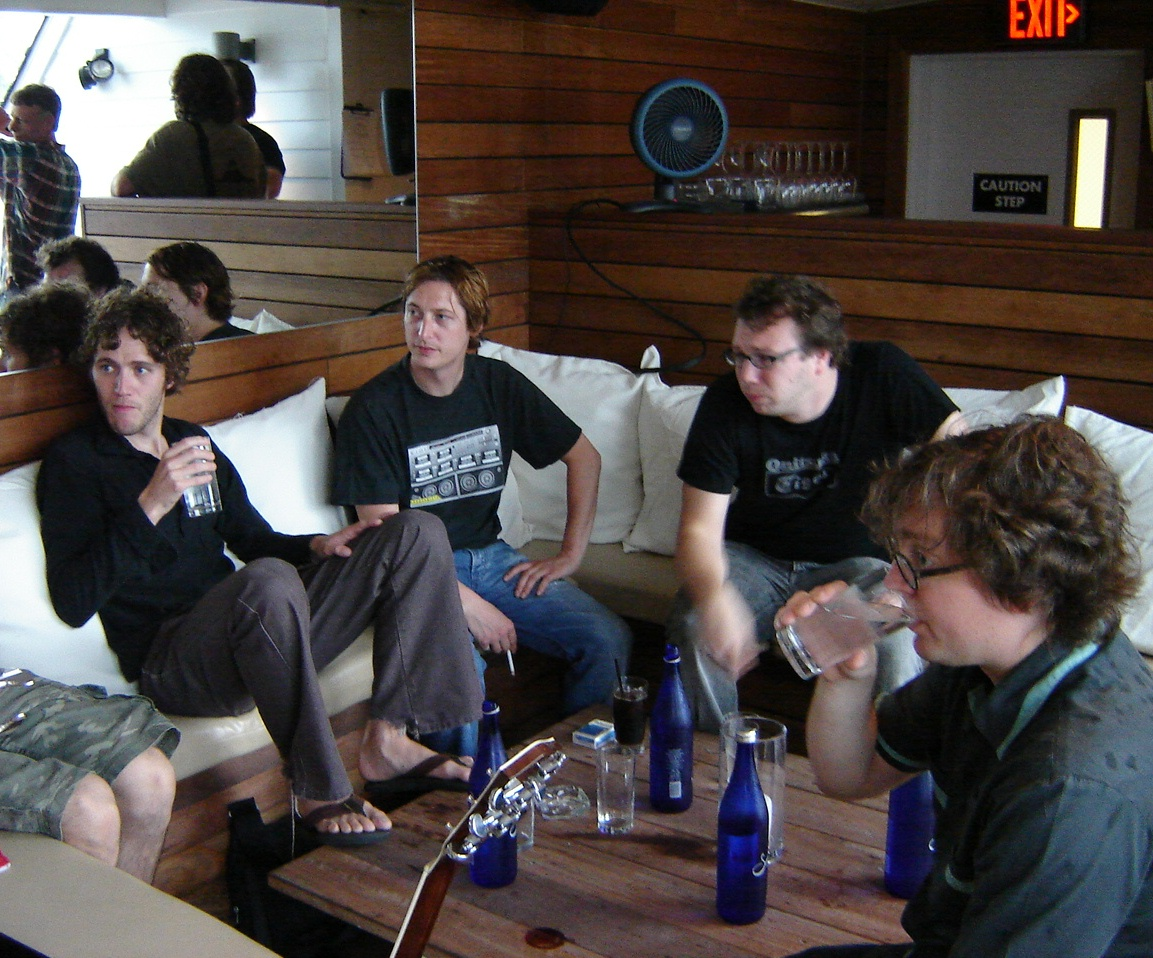
- The band in June 2006

Background information
- Origin: Southport, Merseyside, England
- Genres: Indie rock, post-Britpop, alternative rock, art rock
- Years active: 1996–2019 (hiatus)
- Labels: ATO, MapleMusic Recordings (Canada), Eat Sleep, Independiente, Hut/Virgin
- Members: Ian Ball; Ben Ottewell; Tom Gray; Paul Blackburn; Olly Peacock
- Website: Official website

Gomez are an English indie rock band from Southport, Merseyside. Since its formation, the band's line-up has featured Ian Ball (vocals, guitar), Paul "Blackie" Blackburn (bass), Tom Gray (vocals, guitar, keyboards), Ben Ottewell (vocals, guitar) and Olly Peacock (drums, synth). The band has three singers and four songwriters, employing both traditional and electronic instruments. Their music covers an eclectic blend of genres, including blues, indie rock, alternative rock, folk, psychedelia and experimental music.

Between 1998 and 2011, they released seven studio albums; their first two, 1998's Bring It On and 1999's Liquid Skin, have both been certified platinum by the British Phonographic Industry for sales of more than 300,000 copies in the UK. The band has been inactive since late 2019, although have not officially broken up.

== History ==
=== Formation (1995–1997) ===
Guitarist and vocalist Ian Ball and drummer Olly Peacock are long-time friends, having played in a three-piece band from the ages of 14 to 18. They met bassist Paul Blackburn and multi-instrumentalist Tom Gray at college. Ian Ball met vocalist/guitarist Ben Ottewell at Sheffield University.

The band played its first gig together in 1996 in Leeds at the Hyde Park Social Club on Ash Grove. At the time, they did not have a formal name. The band left a sign out which read "Gomez in here", for a friend of theirs whose surname was Gomez, to indicate that it was the site of their first gig. People saw the sign and assumed that the band's name was Gomez, and it was later made official.

The band started recording four-track demos in Peacock's father's garage in Southport during the summer of 1996. The demos were given to Stephen Fellows (later their manager) who distributed them to four record labels. The band, having played only one performance, decided against playing showcases in London and instead made the record companies travel to Red Tape rehearsal studios. After several weeks of playing to over 25 labels, the band signed to Hut Records (Virgin Records), in September 1997.

=== Bring It On (1997–1998) ===
After signing to Hut Records in September 1997, they began recording their debut album. They entered Parr Street Studios with engineer Ken Nelson, recording new songs and improving the mixes of the demos. The band self-produced, and the album was certified platinum. A season of English Festivals (including two performances at Glastonbury) followed. The band won the Mercury Music Prize in September 1998.

In 1998, Philips Electronics chose Gomez to cover The Beatles' song "Getting Better" for an ad campaign for Philips' new lines of flat panel and high-definition television sets. The cover song was not released on an album until 2000 with Abandoned Shopping Trolley Hotline, a collection of B-sides.

=== Liquid Skin (1999–2000) ===
The band's second album, Liquid Skin, was released in 1999, leading Gomez to success on the British and Australian albums charts. The band also made the Billboard Heatseeker chart for the first time. After winning the Mercury Prize, the band went back to Parr Street Studios, recording as much material as they could between tours. Ken Nelson engineered once again and the band self-produced. The album went platinum and touring followed, including a performance at Glastonbury Festival on the second stage.

=== In Our Gun (2000–2003) ===
The group's third album, In Our Gun, was released in 2002. It made the top 10 on the UK charts and the top 50 on the Australian charts. The single "Shot Shot" charted in the UK top 40, the Portugal top 20, and the Billboard Heatseeker chart. The band produced and recorded the record in Batsford Manor, Gloucestershire, with additional recordings in Studio 2 at Abbey Road Studios. Giving the album a perfect score in his review for PopMatters, Matt Cibula wrote "everyone who doesn’t like this record is insane in a bad way. Screw Wilco; In Our Gun is sounding very much like the Album of the Year."

=== Split the Difference (2004–2005) ===
While Gomez's first three albums were self-produced, the band worked with Tchad Blake as producer for their fourth record, Split the Difference. The band were fans of his compressed sounds as heard on Los Lobos and Latin Playboys recordings. The band built a studio in Portslade, just outside Brighton, England (where most of them were residing). They worked independently for months recording, until they developed a record with Tchad Blake at Real World Studios.

The album, which was released on 17 May 2004, was met with mixed critical response, with Allmusic rating it as four stars out of five and BBC Internet Music Reviews describing it as "one of the finest releases of the year so far. If you were one of those people who wrote them off two years ago, it's time to get listening again." However, the album received less favourable reviews from a number of other sources, including Pitchfork Media and NME. It reached the top 40 in the UK and Australia. The first single "Catch Me Up" entered the UK top 40 in March 2004 and "Silence" was released as the second single.

Virgin/EMI then closed down Hut Recordings; the band asked to be released from their contract and Virgin agreed. In 2005, Gomez signed a deal with Dave Matthews' ATO Records. Under the new label, the band released their first live album, Out West, in June 2005. The double disc CD was compiled from shows recorded at San Francisco's Fillmore Theater in January 2005.

=== How We Operate (2006–2007) ===
Gomez's fifth studio record, How We Operate, was produced by Gil Norton and released on 2 May 2006. The record was developed in the band's studio and later recorded in 6 weeks at RAK Studios, London. The album's title track was featured in the Grey's Anatomy episode "Deterioration of the Fight or Flight Response", and, as an iconic song from the show's soundtrack, it was also covered by Kevin McKidd in the season seven musical episode "Song Beneath the Song". On 14 February 2006, their song "Get Miles" was featured in the House episode "Distractions", and on 6 March 2007, their song "See the World" was featured in the House episode "Half-Wit". "See the World" was also featured in the Bones episode "Widow's Son in the Windshield".

In January 2006, the band performed on Jam Cruise before returning to the studio to put the final touches on How We Operate. After playing the SxSW music festival in Austin, they debuted material from the upcoming release in several US cities. The band's 2006 spring tour included stops in Asheville, Chicago, Minneapolis, Kansas City, Denver, San Francisco, and Portland. They also performed at several large outdoor festivals, including the Beale Street and Bonnaroo Festivals in Tennessee, the Jazzfest in New Orleans and Sasquatch Festival in George, WA.

A collection titled Five Men in a Hut was released on 17 October 2006. The two-disc album consists of released and unreleased tracks recorded under the Hut/Virgin label from 1998–2004. A DVD with music videos and interviews from their time with Hut was also released. They were also one of the bands featured on a John Lennon tribute aired on BBC Radio 2 to mark the 25th anniversary of the musician's death. Gomez performed "Hey Bulldog" by The Beatles, and "Instant Karma!" by Lennon. "How We Operate" is also the ending song to the 2007 remake of the horror film The Hitcher, and acts as the title music for the pilot episode of The Riches.

In 2007, Gomez recorded a cover of The Band's hit "Up On Cripple Creek" for the tribute album Endless Highway: The Music of The Band. Their song "How We Operate" was played in the final scene of the film The Hitcher. Gomez continued to tour, including a co-headlining 2007 US tour with label-mate Ben Kweller. The band toured Australia and New Zealand before going back to the United States for a second headlining leg of their US tour. On 2 March 2007, Gomez recorded a concert at the Vic Theater in Chicago, Illinois, that was streamed via MSN Music. Ian Ball released a solo project, an album entitled Who Goes There. In 2008, Gomez opened several shows for Dave Matthews Band.

=== A New Tide (2008–2010) ===
A wide range of styles were incorporated into Gomez's sound for their next record A New Tide, including blues, Krautrock and psychedelia. The record saw Gomez accompanied by a number of guest musicians, including vocalist Amy Millan, bassist Josh Abrams, cellist Oliver Krauss, and multi-instrumentalist Stuart Bogie.

A New Tide was released on 31 March in the US, in the UK and Europe on 30 March, and in Australia on 28 March 2009. Gomez recorded A New Tide in Chicago, and played festivals including Lollapalooza that year. The album marked a return to their more experimental roots, in particular with songs such as "Win Park Slope" and "Airstream Driver". With this album, the band wanted to create a collection of songs that would work well at live gigs. With the band members scattered across two continents, early tracks were written and recorded individually and then merged online. The material took on its ultimate shape when Gomez convened in studios in Chicago and Charlottesville with producer Brian Deck.

In early 2004, Ian Ball and Olly Peacock were involved in a project called Operation Aloha with 14 other musicians including members from Phantom Planet and Maroon 5. They produced an album over the course of 30 days in Maui, Hawaii. A self-titled album was released on 12 May 2009.

In April 2009, the band's song "Little Pieces" was used in the 19th episode of Grey's Anatomy season 5. It played at the start of the episode in a montage scene. In June 2009, Gomez opened for Pearl Jam on the European leg of the Backspacer Tour.

=== Whatever's on Your Mind (2011–2020) ===
Gomez released their seventh studio album, Whatever's on Your Mind, on 21 June 2011. As with their last album, production on Whatever's on Your Mind was overseen by the band as well as Brian Deck. The band continued to perform together across several national and international tours for the remainder of the 2010s, with their final show to date taking place in November 2019 on a tour of Australia.

=== Hiatus and individual pursuits (2020–present) ===
Since 2020, the members of Gomez have been on individual pursuits outside of the band. Tom Gray has entered UK politics, lobbying the British government to regulate music streaming as part of the Broken Record campaign group. He stood as a Labour Party candidate for Brighton Pavilion in the 2024 general election, but failed to win the seat. Olly Peacock has continued to tour as the live drummer for Empire of the Sun, often joined in the touring band by Ian Ball on guitar. Paul Blackburn tenures at BIMM University in Brighton, teaching bass. Gomez's music is still regularly performed live by the duo of Ben Ottewell and Ian Ball, who tour Australia almost yearly playing songs from the band's back catalogue.

== Members ==
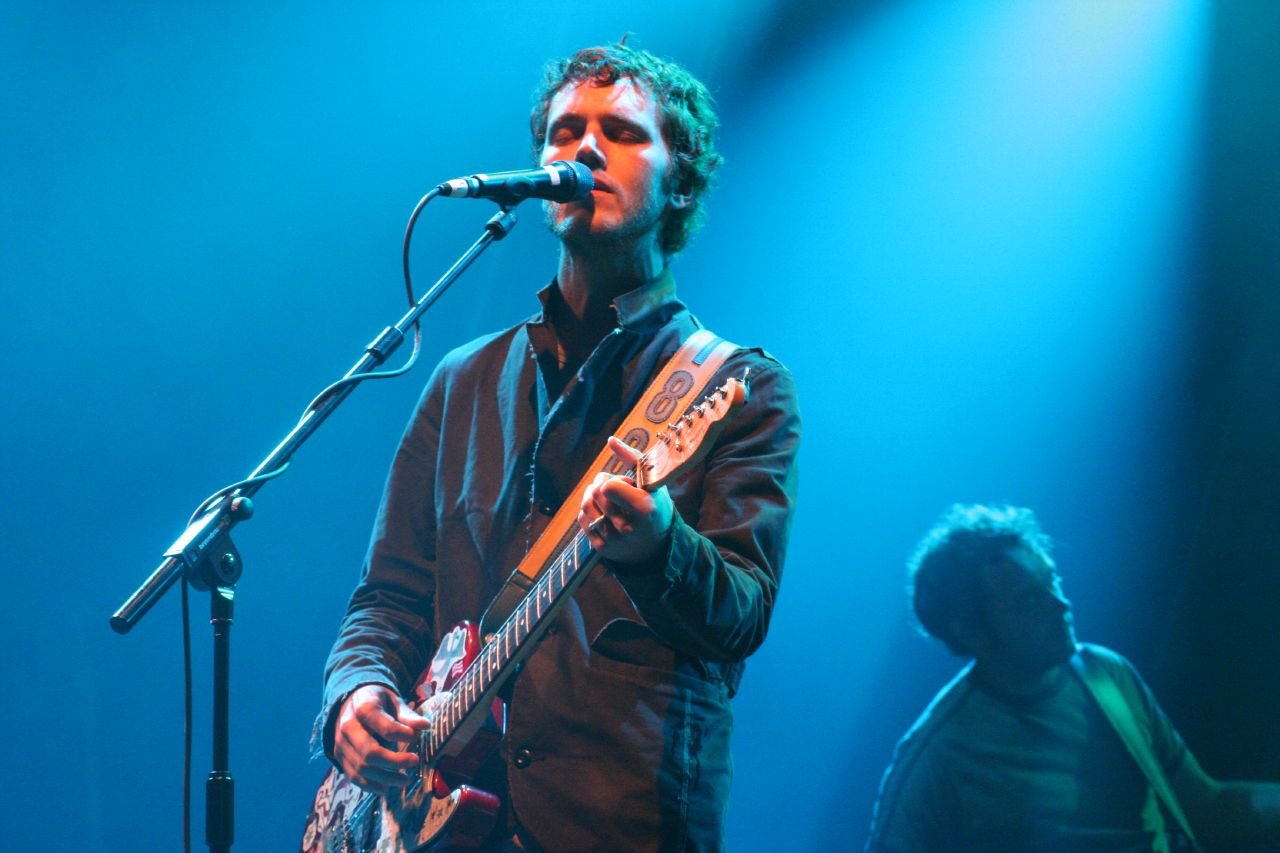
Ian Ball, Beautiful Days Festival, Devon, August 2006

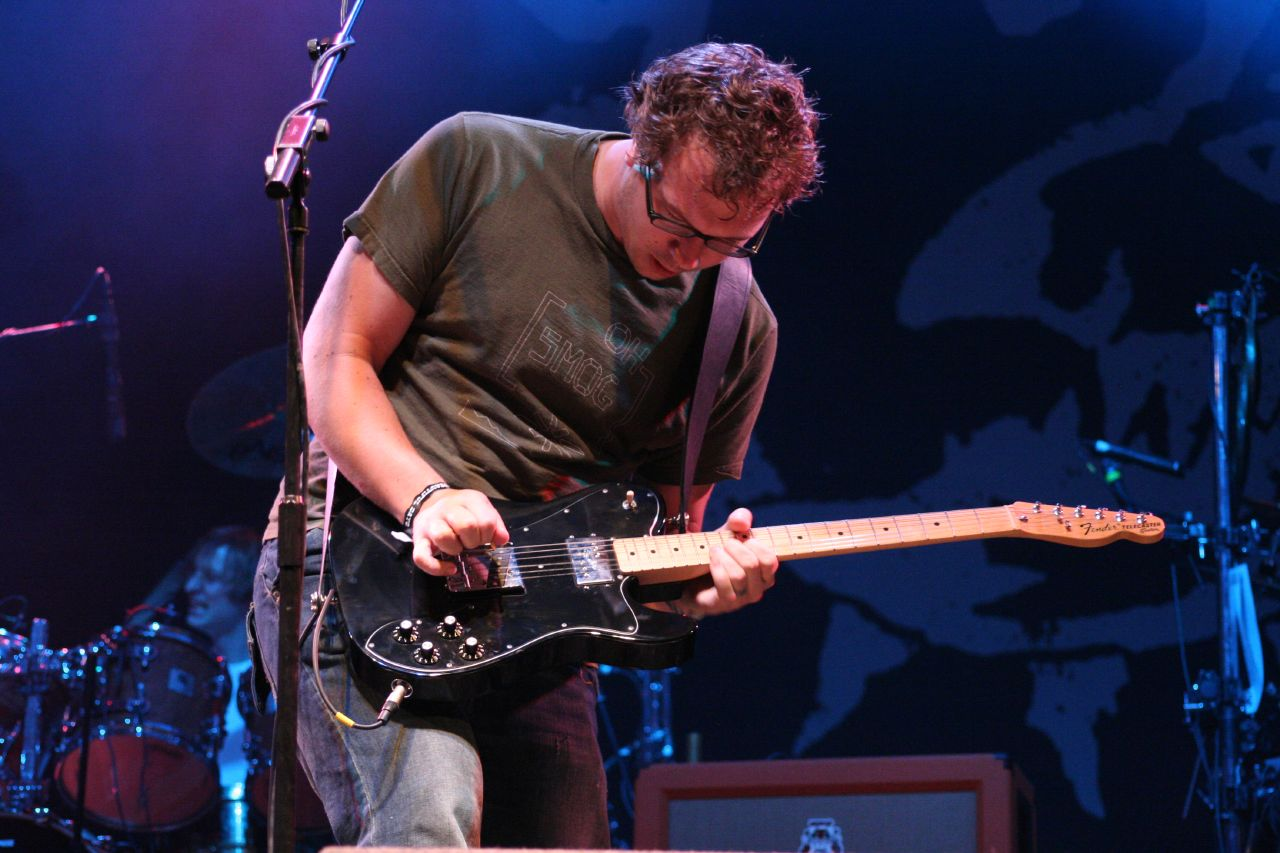
Ben Ottewell, Beautiful Days Festival, Devon, August 2006

- Ian Ball – vocals, guitar
- Ben Ottewell – vocals, guitar, banjo
- Paul Blackburn – bass
- Tom Gray – vocals, guitar, keyboards, programming, sampler
- Olly Peacock – drums, percussion

== Discography ==
=== Studio albums ===
Year	Title	Peak chart positions								Certifications (sales thresholds)
Year	Title	UK	AUS	CAN	NZ	NOR	US	US Heat	US Indie	Certifications (sales thresholds)
1998	Bring It On: Released: 13 April 1998; Label: Hut / Virgin	11	—	—	—	—	—	—	—	BPI: Platinum
1999	Liquid Skin: Released: 13 September 1999; Label: Hut / Virgin	2	9	49	40	19	—	30	—	BPI: Platinum; ARIA: Platinum
2002	In Our Gun: Released: 18 March 2002; Label: Hut / Virgin	8	5	—	13	—	—	37	—	BPI: Silver
2004	Split the Difference: Released: 17 May 2004; Label: Hut / Virgin	35	24	—	39	—	191	11	—	
2006	How We Operate: Released: 5 June 2006; Label: ATO / Independiente	69	37	—	—	—	106	1	7	
2009	A New Tide: Released: 30 March 2009; Label: ATO, Eat Sleep	63	40	—	—	—	60	—	5	
2011	Whatever's on Your Mind: Released: 6 June 2011; Label: ATO, Eat Sleep	65	63	—	—	—	135	—	11	

=== Live albums ===
Year	Title	Chart positions	
Year	Title	UK	US Heat
2005	Out West: Released: 7 June 2005; Label: Independiente / ATO / Sony BMG	145	46

=== Compilations ===
Year	Title	Chart positions			Certifications (sales thresholds)
Year	Title	UK	AUS	US Heat	Certifications (sales thresholds)
2000	Abandoned Shopping Trolley Hotline: Released: 25 September 2000; Label: Hut / Virgin	10	75	44	BPI: Silver
2006	Five Men in a Hut: Released: 25 September 2006; Label: Hut / Virgin	—	77	—	

=== EPs ===
Year	Title
2000	Machismo E.P.: Released: May 2000; Label: Hut / Virgin; Chart: No. 1 (UK Indie), No. 48 (AUS)
2002	Detroit Swing '66/Ping One Down: Released: 1 July 2002; Label: Hut / Virgin
2006	See the World E.P.: Released: October 2006
2006	Girlshapedlovedrug E.P.: Released: 13 November 2006

=== Singles ===
Year		Title	UK	US AAA	Album
1998	30 March	"78 Stone Wobble"	44	—	Bring It On
1998	1 June	"Get Myself Arrested"	45	—	Bring It On
1998	31 August	"Whippin' Piccadilly"	35	—	Bring It On
1999	28 June	"Bring It On"	21	—	Liquid Skin
1999	30 August	"Rhythm & Blues Alibi"	18	—	Liquid Skin
1999	15 November	"We Haven't Turned Around"	38	—	Liquid Skin
2002	4 March	"Shot Shot"	28	—	In Our Gun
2002	3 June	"Sound of Sounds"/"Ping One Down"	48	—	In Our Gun
2004	8 March	"Catch Me Up"	36	—	Split the Difference
2005	10 May	"Silence"	41	—	Split the Difference
2005	30 August	"Sweet Virginia"	42 (UK Indie)	—	Split the Difference
2006	17 April	"How We Operate"	(US-only single)	8	How We Operate
2006	29 May	"Girlshapedlovedrug"	66	—	How We Operate
2006	4 September	"See the World"	107	1	How We Operate
2009	13 April	"Airstream Driver"	—	7	A New Tide
2009	17 August	"Little Pieces"	—	—	A New Tide
2011	30 May	"Options"	76	10	Whatever's on Your Mind

=== Videos ===
Year	Title
2006	Five Men in a Hut: Singles 1998–2004: Released: 25 September 2006; Label: Hut / Virgin

=== Other songs ===
- The Saturday Sessions: The Dermot O'Leary Show (2007) – "Wichita Lineman"
- Dermot O'Leary Presents the Saturday Sessions (2011) – "The Only Living Boy in New York"
- Triple J Like a Version, Vol. 3 – "Breakfast in America"
- Endless Highway: The Music of The Band – "Up On Cripple Creek"
- The Lone Ranger: Wanted (2013) – "Butch's Ballad"
