= Pnau discography =

Discography of Australian dance music group Pnau

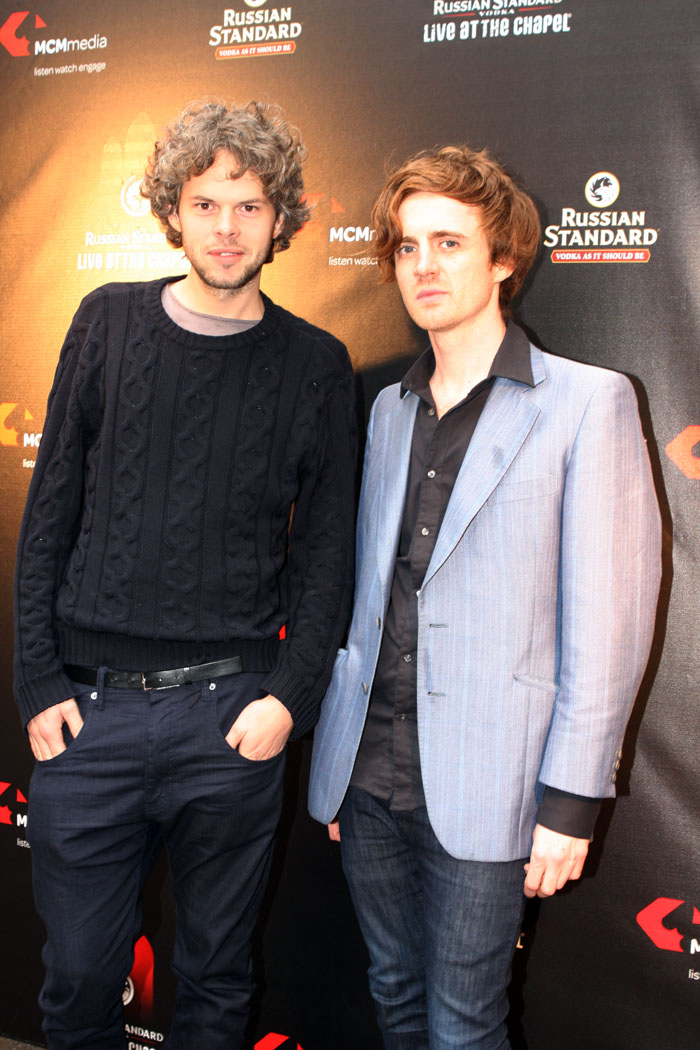
- Pnau in 2011
- Studio albums: 7
- Remix albums: 1
- Singles: 38

The discography of Australian dance music group Pnau consists of seven studio albums, one remix album and 38 singles.

The group have been nominated for many awards, including Australian Independent Record Awards and ARIA Music Awards, winning these at least three times each.

== Albums ==
=== Studio albums ===
Title	Details	Peak chart positions	
Title	Details	AUS	NZ
Sambanova	Released: July 1999; Label: Peking Duck	39	48
Again	Released: 17 October 2003; Label: Warner Australia	103	—
Pnau	Released: 12 November 2007; Label: Etcetc	31	—
Soft Universe	Released: 22 July 2011; Label: Etcetc	13	—
Changa	Released: 10 November 2017; Label: Etcetc	11	—
Hyperbolic	Released: 22 March 2024; Label: Etcetc, Columbia	192	—
Ahhcade	Released: 31 July 2026; Label: Etcetc	33	—
"—" denotes an album that did not chart or was not released.

=== Remix albums ===
Title	Details	Peak chart positions	
Title	Details	AUS	UK
Good Morning to the Night (Elton John and Pnau)	Released: 13 July 2012; Label: Mercury	40	1

== Singles ==
List of singles, with selected chart positions
Year	Title	Peak chart positions										Certifications	Album
Year	Title	AUS	CAN	FRA	GER	ITA	NED	NZ	SPA	SWI	UK	Certifications	Album
2000	"Need Your Lovin' Baby"	165	—	—	—	—	—	—	—	—	—		Sambanova
2001	"Follow Me"	65	—	—	—	—	—	—	—	—	—		Sambanova
2002	"Blood Lust"	— (Note: "Blood Lust" was released as a 12" single in Australia)	—	—	—	—	—	—	—	—	—		Again
2002	"Una Noche (Get Up)" (with Kid Creole and the Coconuts)	54	—	—	—	—	—	—	—	—	—		Non-album single
2003	"We Love the Fresh Kills"/"Again"	— (Note: "We Love The Fresh Kills"/"Again" was released as a 12" single in Australia)	—	—	—	—	—	—	—	—	—		Again
2004	"Enuffs Enuff"	— (Note: "Enuffs Enuff" was released as a 12" single in Australia)	—	—	—	—	—	—	—	—	—		Again
2007	"Wild Strawberries"	— (Note: "Wild Strawberries" was released as a 12" single in Australia)	—	—	—	—	—	—	—	—	—		Pnau
2008	"Baby"	34	—	—	—	—	—	—	—	—	—		Pnau
2008	"Embrace"	55	—	—	—	—	—	—	—	—	—		Pnau
2011	"The Truth"	103	—	—	—	—	—	—	—	—	—		Soft Universe
2011	"Solid Ground"	191	—	—	—	—	—	—	—	—	—		Soft Universe
2012	"Unite Us"	— (Note: "Unite Us" was not released in Australia)	—	—	—	—	—	—	—	—	— (Note: "Unite Us" was released as a 12" single.)		Soft Universe
2012	"Good Morning to the Night" (with Elton John)	71	—	—	—	—	—	—	—	—	—		Good Morning to the Night
2012	"Sad" (with Elton John)	—	—	—	—	—	—	—	—	—	48		Good Morning to the Night
2013	"Changes" (Faul & Wad Ad vs. Pnau)	—	71	9	1	3	15	—	2	4	3	BPI: Platinum; BVMI: Platinum; FIMI: 2× Platinum; IFPI: Gold; MC: Platinum; PROMUSICAE: Gold	Changa (Deluxe)
2016	"Chameleon"	4	—	—	—	—	—	34	—	—	—	ARIA: 4× Platinum; RMNZ: 2× Platinum	Changa
2017	"Go Bang"	9	—	—	—	—	—	—	—	—	—	ARIA: 5× Platinum; RMNZ: Platinum	Changa
2018	"Changa"	151	—	—	—	—	—	—	—	—	—		Changa
2019	"Solid Gold" (featuring Kira Divine and Marques Toliver)	93	—	—	—	—	—	— (Note: "Solid Gold" did not enter the NZ Top 40 Singles Chart, but peaked at number 15 on the NZ Hot Singles Chart.)	—	—	—	ARIA: Platinum; RMNZ: Gold	Hyperbolic
2019	"All of Us" (featuring Ollie Gabriel)	140	—	—	—	—	—	— (Note: "All of Us" did not enter the NZ Top 40 Singles Chart, but peaked at number 21 on the NZ Hot Singles Chart.)	—	—	—		Non-album singles
2020	"Lucky" (with Vlossom)	—	—	—	—	—	—	—	—	—	—		Non-album singles
2020	"River" (with Ladyhawke)	—	—	—	—	—	—	— (Note: "River" did not enter the NZ Top 40 Singles Chart, but peaked at number 31 on the NZ Hot Singles Chart.)	—	—	—		Hyperbolic
2021	"Stranger Love" (with Budjerah)	—	—	—	—	—	—	— (Note: "Stranger Love" did not enter the NZ Top 40 Singles Chart, but peaked at number 34 on the NZ Hot Singles Chart.)	—	—			Non-album single
2022	"You Know What I Need" (with Troye Sivan)	—	—	—	—	—	—	— (Note: "You Know What I Need" did not enter the NZ Top 40 Singles Chart, but peaked at number 22 on the NZ Hot Singles Chart.)	—	—	—		Hyperbolic
2023	"The Hard Way" (with Khalid)	—	—	—	—	—	34	— (Note: "The Hard Way" did not enter the NZ Top 40 Singles Chart, but peaked at number 11 on the NZ Hot Singles Chart.)	—	—			Hyperbolic
2023	"Stars" (with Bebe Rexha and Ozuna)	—	—	—	—	—	—	— (Note: "Stars" did not enter the NZ Top 40 Singles Chart, but peaked at number 19 on the NZ Hot Singles Chart.)	—	—			Hyperbolic
2023	"AEIOU" (with Empire of the Sun)	—	—	—	—	—	—	—	—	—	—		Hyperbolic
2024	"All Your Energy" (featuring Ollie Gabriel)	—	—	—	—	—	—	—	—	—	—		Non-album single
2024	"Nostalgia"	—	—	—	—	—	—	—	—	—	—		Hyperbolic
2024	"The Feeling" (with Rudimental, 1991 and AR/CO)	—	—	—	—	—	—	— (Note: "The Feeling" did not enter the NZ Top 40 Singles Chart, but peaked at number 13 on the NZ Hot Singles Chart.)	—	—	—		Rudim3ntal
2025	"Light Me Up" (with Kungs)	—	—	—	—	—	—	—	—	—	—		Ahhcade
2026	"Rollin'" (with Meduza)	—	—	—	—	—	—	— (Note: "Rollin'" did not enter the NZ Top 40 Singles Chart, but peaked at number 37 on the NZ Hot Singles Chart.)	—	—	—		Ahhcade
2026	"Tu Corazón" (featuring The Warning)	—	—	—	—	—	—	—	—	—	—		Ahhcade
2026	"Nirvana" (with Earthgang and SadMonth)	—	—	—	—	—	—	—	—	—	—		Ahhcade
2026	"Crash" (with Maleigh Zan)	—	—	—	—	—	—	—	—	—	—		Ahhcade
2026	"Chemistry" (featuring Master Peace)	—	—	—	—	—	—	—	—	—	—		Ahhcade
2026	"Serotonin" (featuring Kurtis Wells)	—	—	—	—	—	—	—	—	—	—		Ahhcade
2026	"Change"	—	—	—	—	—	—	—	—	—	—		Ahhcade (Deluxe)
"—" denotes a single that did not chart or was not released in that territory.

=== Promotional singles ===
Year	Title	Album
2012	"Everybody"	Soft Universe
2017	"Young Melody" (featuring Vera Blue)	Changa
2017	"Into the Sky"	Changa
2017	"Control Your Body"	Changa

=== Notable remixes ===
List of notable remixes, with selected chart positions
Year	Title	Peak chart positions										Certifications	Album
Year	Title	AUS	CAN	FRA	GER	NED	NZ	SWE	UK	US	WW	Certifications	Album
2021	"Cold Heart (Pnau remix)" (with Elton John and Dua Lipa)	1	1	9	3	2	1	5	1	7	3	ARIA: 12× Platinum; BPI: 3× Platinum; BMVI: 3× Gold; GLF: 3× Platinum; MC: 7× Platinum; RMNZ: 8× Platinum; SNEP: Diamond	The Lockdown Sessions
2024	"All My Love (Pnau remix)" (with Coldplay)	—	—	—	—	—	— (Note: "All My Love (Pnau remix)" did not enter the NZ Top 31 Singles Chart, but peaked at number 37 on the NZ Hot Singles Chart.)	—	—	—	—		
