= Changa (album) =

Studio album by Pnau
- Released: 10 November 2017
- Genres: Pop; disco; rave
- Length: 44:25
- Label: etcetc
- Producer: Pnau

Pnau chronology
Good Morning to the Night (2012)	Changa (2017)	Hyperbolic (2024)

Singles from Changa
- 1. "Chameleon" Released: 4 November 2016; 2. "Go Bang" Released: 27 October 2017; 3. "Changa" Released: 11 May 2018

Changa is the fifth studio album by Australian electronic trio Pnau. It was released on 10 November 2017 by the independent label etcetc. It follows their 2012 remix album in collaboration with Elton John, Good Morning to the Night, and is their first studio album since Soft Universe (2011). It is also their first album as a trio, with vocalist and co-founder Nick Littlemore's brother Sam Littlemore joining in 2016.

A pop, disco, and rave album, Changa was preceded by the lead single "Chameleon" in November 2016, which reached number four on the ARIA Singles Chart, and number 11 on the Triple J Hottest 100, 2016. It features vocals by Kira Divine. It has received over 85 million streams on Spotify and been certified double platinum by the Australian Recording Industry Association. On 25 August, Pnau released three more tracks in promotion of the album: "Into the Sky", "Young Melody" featuring Vera Blue, and "Control Your Body", with "Into the Sky" debuting on Triple J. Divine also lent vocals to "Control Your Body". "Into the Sky" was accompanied by a video of Nick Littlemore as a floating head set against psychedelic visuals. "Go Bang" was released as a single on 27 October.

In the lead-up to the album's release, the trio embarked on an Australian tour, performing at the Listen Out festival in Sydney on 30 September, and at the Adelaide dance event Oh Yes.

At the ARIA Music Awards of 2018, Changa was nominated for Album of the Year.

== Music and themes ==
Upon its release, Mixmag compared "Young Melody" to the "smooth lounge vibes of PNAU's sublime debut LP Sambanova". Pnau said of "Into the Sky": "It is a song that wrote itself. We like to think that it captures the ambition, angst and ambivalence we held as teenagers." Nick Littlemore commented that the trio had been influenced by Happy Mondays for the song. Al Newstead of ABC called "Into the Sky" a "fuzzy, distorted drum heavy track that [...] tak[es] inspiration from the 'Madchester' '90s dance scene". He also labeled "Young Melody" a "blissful dance" track, and noted the "4am rave vibes" of "Control Your Body". Amnplify described "Control Your Body" as having "enigmatic instrumentation and vocals before settling into a deep rhythmic groove – a true acid workout and a nostalgic homage to the bands [sic] formative rave days".

"Chameleon" was additionally called a "festival favourite and dance floor anthem".

== Album title ==
The album is named after Changa, the DMT-infused smokeable form of ayahuasca.

== Track listing ==
No.	Title	Writer(s)	Producer(s)	Length
1.	"Save Disco" (with The Two Leaves)	Nick Littlemore; Peter Mayes; Theo Hutchcraft; Sam Littlemore; Shakira Marshall	Pnau	3:54
2.	"Chameleon"	N. Littlemore; Mayes; S. Littlemore	Pnau	3:18
3.	"Go Bang"	N. Littlemore; Mayes; S. Littlemore; Luke Steele	Pnau	3:09
4.	"Changa"	N. Littlemore; Mayes; S. Littlemore	Pnau	3:25
5.	"In My Head"	N. Littlemore; Mayes; S. Littlemore	Pnau	3:07
6.	"Into the Sky"	N. Littlemore; Mayes; S. Littlemore	Pnau	2:57
7.	"Please Forgive Me"	N. Littlemore; Mayes; S. Littlemore	Pnau	3:02
8.	"Young Melody" (featuring Vera Blue)	N. Littlemore; Mayes; Tim Lefebvre; Celia Pavey; S. Littlemore	Pnau	3:41
9.	"Nothing in the World"	N. Littlemore; Mayes; S. Littlemore	Pnau	3:12
10.	"Control Your Body"	N. Littlemore; Mayes; S. Littlemore	Pnau	4:06
11.	"La Grenouille"	N. Littlemore; Mayes; S. Littlemore	Pnau	4:52
12.	"Changes" (vs. Faul & Wad Ad)	N. Littlemore; Mayes; S. Littlemore	Faul & Wad Ad	5:42
Total length:				44:25

2018 tour edition bonus tracks
No.	Title	Writer(s)	Length
12.	"Embrace"	N. Littlemore; Mayes; S. Littlemore; P. Brown	5:29
13.	"Wild Strawberries"	N. Littlemore; Mayes; S. Littlemore	3:55
14.	"Baby"	N. Littlemore; Mayes; S. Littlemore	2:45
15.	"No More Violence"	N. Littlemore; Mayes; S. Littlemore; K. Moyes	4:54
16.	"With You Forever"	N. Littlemore; Mayes; S. Littlemore; Luke Steele	3:34
17.	"Come Together"	N. Littlemore; Mayes; S. Littlemore; M. Di Francesco	5:01
Total length:			64:20

Notes

- Tracks 1, 2, 3, 4, 5, 9 and 10 feature vocals by Kira Divine.
- The bonus tracks from the 2018 tour edition came from their previous album Pnau.

== Charts ==
Chart performance for Changa
Chart (2017)	Peak position
Australian Albums (ARIA)	11
Australian Dance Albums (ARIA)	1
New Zealand Heatseeker Albums (RMNZ)	5
