= Changa =

Changa may refer to:

- Changa (restaurant), a restaurant in Istanbul, Turkey
- Changa, Anand, a village in Gujarat, India
- Changa, Leh, a village in Jammu and Kashmir, India
- Changa, Pakistan, a town in Pakistan
- Changa tuki a life-style including clothing, music and dance originated in Venezuela
- ChaNGa, a code to perform collisionless N-body simulations
- John Harrison Clark (c. 1860–1927), also called Changa-Changa, a settler of today's Zambia
- Changdev Maharaj, an Indian mystic
- Changa (drug), a smokable form of ayahuasca, containing DMT
- Changa (album), a 2017 album by electronic trio Pnau
  - "Changa" (song), the title track
- Chance Bateman (born 1981), AFL footballer nicknamed "Changa"
- Ricardo Álvarez (Mexican footballer), Mexican First Division player, nicknamed "La Changa"
- Changa (cicada), a genus of cicadas
- Changaa, a distilled Kenyan alcoholic beverage (also spelled changa)
