= River (Pnau and Ladyhawke song) =

Single by Pnau and Ladyhawke

from the album Hyperbolic
- Released: 11 December 2020
- Length: 3:21
- Label: Etcetc
- Songwriters: Nick Littlemore; Peter Mayes; Sam Littlemore; Phillipa Brown
- Producer: Pnau

Pnau singles chronology
"Lucky" (2020)	"River" (2020)	"Stranger Love" (2021)

Ladyhawke singles chronology
"Colours in the Dark" (2019)	"River" (2020)	"Guilty Love" (2021)

Music video
- "River" on YouTube

"River" is a song by Australian electronic trio Pnau and New Zealand electropop singer-songwriter, Ladyhawke and released on 11 December 2020.

At the AIR Awards of 2021, the song was nominated for Best Independent Dance, Electronica or Club Single.

At the APRA Music Awards of 2022, the song was nominated for Most Performed Dance/Electronic Work.

== Background and release ==
From 2004-2007, Pnau's Nick Littlemore and Phillipa "Pip" Brown (later known as Ladyhawke) formed the art rock and dance band Teenager. The band was a side-project for Littlemore who was part of Sydney dance music trio, Pnau.

In 2007, Ladyhawke provided uncredited vocals on the song "Embrace" which was released in June 2008 as the third and final single from the Pnau's third studio album, Pnau. "Embrace" peaked at number 55 on the ARIA Charts. Pnau and Ladyhawke did not collaborate with each between 2007 and 2020.

In 2020, Pnau approached Ladyhawke to work together again on something new. In working with Ladyhawke once again, Pnau's Nick Littlemore said "It seems every time we've collaborated with her it's been incendiary. We met a long while ago; within moments of meeting it was clear we had a deep connection. This tune is a combination of Ladyhawke's brilliance and the inspiring work of Sam and Peter. I really believe this song is the living proof of magic; all the elements coming together just right. I hope with all sincerity that you experience the joy we did in making it."

Ladyhawke's said "I've always had a unique connection with Nick Littlemore so knew whatever we made would be special. I remember standing in Nick's LA home studio screaming into a microphone being egged on by him yelling 'Louder!!!!' so I could get the 'Riveerrrrrrrrrrrrrrrr' just right! I love this track and am very excited to be involved."

== Reception ==
Claire Bracken from ABC said "'River' flows like a dream straight into the bassline of your brain" ending their review saying "Get ready dance floors, this track is coming for you."

The Music called the song "a homage to PNAU's roots in the rave and progressive scenes of the late '90s and 2000s" calling the song "Another Banger."

Hayden Davis from Pilerats called it "one of the brightest songs of the year (and a latecomer for the year's most infectious)".

== Track listings ==
Digital download

1. "River" – 3:20

Digital download

1. "River" (Tobiahs remix) – 5:03

Digital download

1. "River" (Jack Burton remix) – 5:26

== Charts ==
Chart performance for "River"
Chart (2020)	Peak position
New Zealand Hot Singles (RMNZ)	31
