= Stars (Pnau, Bebe Rexha and Ozuna song) =

2023 single by Pnau, Bebe Rexha and Ozuna

Single by Pnau, Bebe Rexha and Ozuna

from the album Hyperbolic
- Language: English; Spanish
- Released: 19 May 2023
- Genre: Disco-pop; dance-pop
- Length: 2:51
- Label: Etcetc; Columbia
- Songwriters: Nick Littlemore; Sam Littlemore; Peter Mayes; Bleta Rexha; Juan Carlos Ozuna Rosado; Janée Bennett; Yazid Rivera
- Producer: Pnau

Pnau singles chronology
| "The Hard Way" (2023) | "Stars" (2023) | "AEIOU" (2023) |

Bebe Rexha singles chronology
| "Satellite" (2023) | "Stars" (2023) | "If Only I" (2023) |

Ozuna singles chronology
| "Mar Chiquita" (2022) | "Stars" (2023) | "Tucu" (2023) |

Music video
- "Stars" on YouTube

"Stars" is a song by Australian electronic trio Pnau, American singer Bebe Rexha and Puerto Rican rapper Ozuna. It was released on 19 May 2023 through Etcetc Music and later reissued through Columbia Records as the third single from Pnau's sixth studio album, Hyperbolic (2024).

== Background ==
About the collaboration, Pnau's Nick Littlemore said: "Music has the ultimate power to heal and bring forth energy that's locked inside each and every one of you. 'Stars' is about finding that inner light and letting it shine so that all the world can see. The song is the culmination of magical beings working together. Never in our wildest dreams did we imagine working with Bebe Rexha and Ozuna in 2023." Bebe Rexha said: "When Pnau first played me 'Stars' it catapulted me to another planet, the disco elements and the concept made me feel like I was floating. I loved collaborating with Pnau and Ozuna, they are both so talented and unique and I am so excited for the world to hear this collab." Ozuna said, "I have been a fan of Bebe Rexha and Pnau's music for some time, so this is a dream collab in both English and Spanish that feels like a global track."

== Music video ==
An AI generated music video directed by Kuba Matyka and Kamila Staszczyszyn from the Polish creative studio Melt AI was released alongside the song. It features Rexha and Ozuna in a psychedelic dream-like outer space-themed futuristic world.

== Track listings ==
Digital download/streaming

1. "Stars" – 2:51

Digital download/streaming (The Remixes)

1. "Stars" – 2:51
2. "Stars" (Jaded remix) – 3:34
3. "Stars" (Kungs remix) - 3:21
4. "Stars" (Jaaka remix) – 3:05
5. "Stars" (Close Counters remix) - 4:08

== Charts ==
=== Weekly charts ===
Weekly chart performance for "Stars"
| Chart (2023) | Peak position |
|---|---|
| Australian Independent Singles (AIR) | 6 |
| Belarus Airplay (TopHit) | 30 |
| Croatia International Airplay (Top lista) | 67 |
| Czech Republic Airplay (ČNS IFPI) | 71 |
| Estonia Airplay (TopHit) | 16 |
| Lithuania Airplay (TopHit) | 41 |
| Lithuania Airplay (TopHit) Denis First Remix | 49 |
| New Zealand Hot Singles (RMNZ) | 19 |
| Russia Airplay (TopHit) | 13 |
| San Marino (SMRRTV Top 50) | 39 |
| US Hot Dance/Electronic Songs (Billboard) | 36 |

=== Monthly charts ===
Monthly chart performance for "Stars"
| Chart (2023) | Peak position |
|---|---|
| Belarus Airplay (TopHit) | 36 |
| CIS Airplay (TopHit) | 29 |
| Estonia Airplay (TopHit) | 22 |
| Lithuania Airplay (TopHit) | 52 |
| Russia Airplay (TopHit) | 19 |

=== Year-end charts ===
Year-end chart performance for "Stars"
| Chart (2023) | Position |
|---|---|
| Belarus Airplay (TopHit) | 131 |
| CIS (TopHit) | 89 |
| Estonia Airplay (TopHit) | 54 |
| Lithuania Airplay (TopHit) | 184 |
| Russia Airplay (TopHit) | 66 |
