= Stranger Love =

2021 single by Pnau featuring Budjerah

Single by Pnau and Budjerah
- Released: 28 May 2021
- Length: 3:45
- Label: Etcetc
- Songwriter(s): Joel Quartermain; Budjerah Slabb; Nick Littlemore; Peter Mayes; Sam Littlemore
- Producer(s): Pnau

Pnau singles chronology
"River" (2020)	"Stranger Love" (2021)	"You Know What I Need" (2022)

Budjerah singles chronology
"Higher" (2021)	"Stranger Love" (2021)	"Talk" (2021)

Music video
- "Stranger Love" on YouTube

"Stranger Love" is a song by Australian electronic trio Pnau and Australian singer Budjerah, released through Etcetc on 28 May 2021. Both artists revealed the collaboration on their social media prior to its release. The song was released on 28 May 2021. Pnau's Nick Littlemore described the song as "an interstellar banger to be enjoyed by the trippy dreamer in all of us." Remixes were released on 4 August 2021.

At the AIR Awards of 2022, the song was nominated for Best Independent Dance, Electronica or Club Single.

== Background and release ==
Speaking to Triple J on 27 May 2021, Nick Littlemore revealed that Budjerah had initially written the song as an acoustic ballad, with Joel Quartermain. "I heard [his voice] on a very early demo and it knocked my socks off. We took Budjerah to the dance-floor for this one."

Budjerah said "The song was written based on the book The Little Prince by Antoine de Saint-Exupéry and describes the relationship between the young boy (the little Prince) and a rose that lands on his home planet. The boy cares for her, he gives her his love and attention, but the rose doesn't really appreciate the boy, so he leaves the planet." Budjerah added "It was really fun to make the track with PNAU. I recorded the vocals with Nick Littlemore when we met in Byron in February of 2021. The performance element of a dance record is quite different to what I'm used to, but it was really fun. It sounds really great."

In the week of the song's release, Pnau's social media posts read "Meeting a young, spirited artist like Budjerah is beautiful and challenging. To encounter someone so young who already has a great handle on creativity and kindness confronts ones own insecurities. He comes across as a natural, not something one sees a lot of in this business. Whilst we come from vastly different experiences, the supernatural power of music brought us together."

== Critical reception ==
Laura English from Music Feeds' called the song "super impressive" and one "that sees them combine both their signature sounds so well." Ben Madden from Cool Accidents said "If you're looking for a song to soundtrack your weekend adventures, then look no further. 'Stranger Love' will get your body grooving and will leave your heart full of happiness. It's a great reminder of the power of music."

Rob Mullineau from OZ EDM called the song "A powerful and uplifting house track". AAA Backstage called the song "top shelf" saying "'Stranger Love' is a powerful and mega uplifting track, it sees the classic style of production from PNAU injected with a fresh new marriage of harmony with the vocals of Budjerah."

== Track listings ==
Digital download/streaming

1. "Stranger Love" – 3:20

Digital download/streaming (The Remixes)

1. "Stranger Love" (Dave Winnel remix) – 3:14
2. "Stranger Love" (Taka Perry remix) – 4:25
3. "Stranger Love" (Eddie remix) – 4:15
4. "Stranger Love" (Stacie Fields remix) – 4:20

== Charts ==
Chart performance for "Stranger Love"
Chart (2021)	Peak position
Australian Club Tracks (ARIA)	15
New Zealand Hot Singles (RMNZ)	34
