= You Know What I Need =

2022 single by Pnau and Troye Sivan

Single by Pnau and Troye Sivan

from the album Hyperbolic
- Released: 2 December 2022
- Length: 2:50
- Label: Etcetc; Columbia
- Songwriters: Brett McLaughlin; Kaelyn Behr; Kevin Garrett; Nick Littlemore; Peter Mayes; Sam Littlemore; Reuben Butler; Troye Sivan
- Producers: Pnau; Reuben James

Pnau singles chronology
"Stranger Love" (2021)	"You Know What I Need" (2022)	"The Hard Way" (2023)

Troye Sivan singles chronology
"Wait" (2022)	"You Know What I Need" (2022)	"Rush" (2023)

Music video
- "You Know What I Need" on YouTube

"You Know What I Need" is a song by Australian electronic trio Pnau and Australian singer Troye Sivan. It was released on 2 December 2022 through Etcetc Music and later reissued through Columbia Records as the lead single from the trio's sixth studio album, Hyperbolic (2024).

== Background ==
In a statement, PNAU's lead, Nick Littlemore, said "Working with Troye again has been amazing. When we wrote this song, we had no idea that we will get so lucky to have Troye Sivan singing and bringing his unbridled creativity to the world of PNAU." Sivan later stated: "I'm so happy this song is coming out just before the Australian summer, it sounds like a beach festival to me, and I am stoked to have it out."

== Music video ==
The music video of "You Know What I Need" was released alongside and directed by the Polish collective, Melt AI. It transforms a cell phone-recorded video of Sivan into an outer space. According to the music video producer, Kuba Matka, who described it as a "trippy psychedelic visual", it was inspired by the stargate sequence from 2001: A Space Odyssey.

== Critical reception ==
Upon its released, the song received positive reviews from music critics. Tyler Jenke from Music Feeds called the song a "summery pop anthem" that "places Pnau[']s eclectic electronic instrumentation alongside Sivan's soaring vocals." Greta Brereton from NME called it "a fitting blend of Sivan's easygoing pop and the energetic dance music Pnau are known for, with smatterings of upbeat synth, catchy production and soaring vocals". Politica Mente Corretto felt that "Troye's enveloping falsetto ties into the immediacy and elegance of Pnau's sound, making 'You Know What I Need' a perfect combination of radio pop and modern disco groove."

Joost Landzaat from Nieuweplaat wrote, "The track is reminiscent of the music Years & Years and is about not being able to live without someone, but also not being able to be with them."

== Nominations ==
At the AIR Awards of 2023, "You Know What I Need" was nominated for Best Independent Dance, Electronica or Club Single, at the 2023 ARIA Music Awards for Best Dance/Electronic Release, and at the APRA Music Awards of 2024 for Most Performed Dance/Electronic Work.

== Charts ==
Chart performance for "You Know What I Need"
Chart (2022)	Peak position
Australian Independent Singles (AIR)	2
Czech Republic Airplay (ČNS IFPI)	53
New Zealand Hot Singles (RMNZ)	22
Poland (Polish Airplay Top 100)	16
San Marino (SMRRTV Top 50)	3
US Hot Dance/Electronic Songs (Billboard)	26
