= The Hard Way (Pnau and Khalid song) =

2023 single by Pnau and Khalid

Single by Pnau and Khalid

from the album Hyperbolic
- Released: 10 March 2023
- Genre: Tropical house; synth-pop
- Length: 3:03
- Label: Etcetc; Columbia
- Songwriters: Nick Littlemore; Sam Littlemore; Peter Mayes; Khalid Robinson
- Producer: Pnau

Pnau singles chronology
"You Know What I Need" (2022)	"The Hard Way" (2023)	"Stars" (2023)

Khalid singles chronology
"We Go Down Together" (2023)	"The Hard Way" (2023)	"Softest Touch" (2023)

Lyric video
- "The Hard Way" on YouTube

"The Hard Way" is a song by Australian electronic trio Pnau and American singer Khalid. It was released on 10 March 2023 through Etcetc Music and later reissued through Columbia Records as the second single from Pnau's sixth studio album, Hyperbolic (2024).

== Background ==
In a statement, Pnau's Nick Littlemore, said "We are so very excited to share this with you. Working with Khalid has been an absolute dream, we hope this song shall live in your hearts like it does ours." About the song, Khalid said "It's just awesome; it's feel-good but then the lyrics have that melancholy, bittersweet thing about them, it's that juxtaposition, that the lyrics are heartbreakingly sad but if you listen to the song, you can't help but smile."

== Critical reception ==
Triple J said "On the track, the Sydney trio brings an unapologetically big and sugary synth-pop hit, coupled with a melancholic lyrical performance from Khalid."

Conor Lochie from Tone Deaf said "The sublime synth-pop number conjures nostalgic memories of wholehearted '80s music. Khalid's compelling voice sings forlorn, lovelorn words, surrounded by splendid and splashy melodies. It's just the right mixture of upbeat rhythm and melancholic lyricism."

Buddy Iahn from The Music Universe said "It's big scale contemporary pop at its finest, with Pnau's sublime synthpop providing the towering melodies and supremely confident hook that allows Khalid's starry vocal majesty to shine. The two artists really lean into each other's vibe to establish a depth of feeling, with Khalid's lovelorn lyricism and sentimental emotions complemented by Pnau's ability to evoke nostalgic '80s sonic elements within a modernistic production."

== Charts ==
=== Weekly charts ===
Weekly chart performance for "The Hard Way"
Chart (2023)	Peak position
Australian Independent Singles (AIR)	2
Belgium (Ultratop 50 Flanders)	9
Belgium (Ultratop 50 Wallonia)	20
Japan Hot Overseas (Billboard Japan)	15
Latvia Airplay (LAIPA)	12
Netherlands (Dutch Top 40)	32
Netherlands (Single Tip)	16
New Zealand Hot Singles (RMNZ)	11
Poland (Polish Airplay Top 100)	3
US Hot Dance/Electronic Songs (Billboard)	12

=== Year-end charts ===
Year-end chart performance for "The Hard Way"
Chart (2023)	Position
Belgium (Ultratop 50 Flanders)	30
Belgium (Ultratop 50 Wallonia)	85
Poland (Polish Airplay Top 100)	21

== Certifications ==
Certifications for "The Hard Way"
Region	Certification	Certified units/sales
Poland (ZPAV)	Gold	25,000^{‡}
^{‡} Sales+streaming figures based on certification alone.
