= Solid Gold (Pnau song) =

Single by Pnau featuring Kira Divine & Marques Toliver

from the album Hyperbolic
- Released: 1 May 2019
- Label: Etcetc
- Songwriters: Nick Littlemore; Peter Mayes; Sam Littlemore

Pnau singles chronology
"Changa" (2018)	"Solid Gold" (2019)	"All of Us" (2019)

Music video
- "Solid Gold" on YouTube

"Solid Gold" is a song by Pnau featuring Kira Divine & Marques Toliver and released in May 2019 as the lead single from the band's sixth studio album, Hyperbolic (2024). The song was previewed in 2018 at their Splendour in the Grass set.

At the ARIA Music Awards of 2019, the song was nominated for Best Dance Release and Best Video.

At the APRA Music Awards of 2020, "Solid Gold" was nominated for Most Performed Dance Work of the Year.

At the AIR Awards of 2020, the song was nominated for Best Independent Dance, Electronica or Club Single.

== Reception ==
Sose Fuamoli from Triple J said "'Solid Gold' falls perfectly in line with Pnau's stable of bright and uplifting dance music." Amnplify said "The song was inspired equal parts by Nick Littlemore's explorations into world music and the sun drenched energy of Australia, incorporating live instrumentation to create a richer, fuller sound. It's a banger built to soundtrack good." auspOp put the song "straight into the pile of the year's best" calling it "a sparkling mid-tempo disco-pop number with pulsing beats, a sharp piano line and soulful vocals."

== Charts ==
Chart (2019)	Peak position
Australia (ARIA)	94
New Zealand Hot Singles (RMNZ)	15

== Certifications ==
Region	Certification	Certified units/sales
Australia (ARIA)	Platinum	70,000^{‡}
New Zealand (RMNZ)	Gold	15,000^{‡}
^{‡} Sales+streaming figures based on certification alone.

== Release history ==
Country	Date	Format	Label	Version
Australia	1 May 2019	Digital download, streaming	Etcetc	Original
