= Chabinga =

Chabinga is a surname. Notable people with the surname include:

- Manfred Chabinga (born 1965), Zambian footballer
- Robert Chabinga (born 1981), Zambian politician
- Tabitha Chabinga (born 1996), Malawian professional footballer

== See also ==
- Changa
- Binga
