= Chameleon (Pnau song) =

Single by Pnau

from the album Changa
- Released: 4 November 2016
- Genre: Electronic, dance-pop
- Length: 3:18
- Label: Etcetc
- Songwriters: Nick Littlemore; Peter Mayes; Sam Littlemore

Pnau singles chronology
"Changes" (2013)	"Chameleon" (2016)	"Go Bang" (2017)

Music video
- "Chameleon" on YouTube

"Chameleon" is a song by Pnau, released in November 2016 as the lead single from the band's fifth studio album, Changa (2017). It is co-written by band members, Nick Littlemore, his older brother Sam Littlemore, and Peter Mayes. "Chameleon" is the first new original music from Pnau since their album Soft Universe in 2011. The song features vocals from Kira Divine. The song peaked at number 4 on the Australian charts and was certified platinum. Digital remixes were released on 25 November 2016 and on 26 May 2017.

At the ARIA Music Awards of 2017, the song won the ARIA Award for Best Dance Release.

At the APRA Music Awards of 2018, the song was nominated for Dance Work of the Year and Most Played Australian Work.

== Reception ==
Emily Mack from Music Feeds called the song a "“bonkers” half-schoolyard singalong, half-tribal dancefloor toe-tapper" Amnplify called the song a "festival favourite and dance floor anthem" Monique Hughes from Howl and Echoes described the song as "a big, kaleidoscopic, addictively-catchy party single".

== Track listing ==
Digital download

1. "Chameleon" – 3:18

Digital download (remixes)

1. "Chameleon" (Crookers Remix) – 5:56
2. "Chameleon" (LDRU Remix) – 4:25
3. "Chameleon" (Dom Dolla Remix) – 5:05
4. "Chameleon" (Kormak Remix) – 5:05

Digital download (remixes)

1. "Chameleon" (Blonde Remix) – 3:11
2. "Chameleon" (Melé Remix) – 4:06
3. "Chameleon" (Klue Remix) – 5:05
4. "Chameleon" (The Apx Remix) – 5:05

== Charts ==
=== Weekly charts ===
Chart (2016–17)	Peak position
Australia (ARIA)	4
Australia Club (ARIA)	1
Australia Dance (ARIA)	1
New Zealand (Recorded Music NZ)	34

=== Year-end charts ===
Chart (2017)	Position
Australia (ARIA)	32
Australia Club (ARIA)	2
Australia Dance (ARIA)	7

== Certifications ==
Region	Certification	Certified units/sales
Australia (ARIA)	4× Platinum	280,000^{‡}
New Zealand (RMNZ)	2× Platinum	60,000^{‡}
^{‡} Sales+streaming figures based on certification alone.

== Release history ==
Country	Date	Format	Label	Version
Australia	4 November 2016	Digital download, streaming	Etcetc	Original
Australia	25 November 2016	Digital download, streaming	Etcetc	Remixes
Australia	26 May 2017	Digital download, streaming	Etcetc	Remixes
