= Follow Me (Pnau song) =

2001 single by Pnau

Single by Pnau

from the album Sambanova
- Released: July 2001
- Label: Warner Music Australia
- Songwriters: Ashton Millard; Dave Cooke; Sam Littlemore
- Producer: Pnau

Pnau singles chronology
| "Need Your Lovin' Baby" (2000) | "Follow Me" (2001) | "Blood Lust" (2002) |

"Follow Me" is a song by Australian electronic house band Pnau and was released in July 2001 as the second single from the band's debut studio album, Sambanova. The song peaked at number 65 on the Australian Singles Chart. The song was their first to enter the Australian radio top 50 playlist.

== Track listing ==
CD single

1. "Follow Me" (radio edit) – 3:25
2. "Follow Me" (album version) – 6:08
3. "The Red Tapes" – 4:55

== Charts ==
| Chart (2001) | Peak position |
|---|---|
| Australia (ARIA) | 65 |
