= Hyperbolic (album) =

Studio album by Pnau
- Released: 22 March 2024
- Genres: Pop; disco; house; dance-pop
- Length: 31:14
- Labels: Etcetc; Columbia
- Producers: Pnau; Donnie Sloan

Pnau chronology
Changa (2017)	Hyperbolic (2024)	Ahhcade (2026)

Singles from Hyperbolic
- 1. "You Know What I Need" Released: 2 December 2022; 2. "The Hard Way" Released: 11 March 2023; 3. "Stars" Released: 19 May 2023; 4. "AEIOU" Released: 13 October 2023; 5. "Nostalgia" Released: 22 March 2024

Hyperbolic is the sixth studio album by Australian electronic music trio Pnau, released on 22 March 2024 through Etcetc Music and later reissued through Columbia Records. Their first album in seven years since Changa (2017), it features collaborations and guests appearances from Empire of the Sun, Khalid, Kira Divine, Marques Toliver, Bebe Rexha, Ozuna, Troye Sivan, Ladyhawke, and Emily Wurramara.

At the AIR Awards of 2025, the album was nominated for Best Independent Dance or Electronica Album or EP.

== Background ==
The album title was announced alongside the release of "AEIOU".

== Critical reception ==
Professional ratings
Review scores
Source	Rating
The Guardian	3/5 stars

Jack Tregoning from The Guardian said "What's immediately obvious about Hyperbolic is that it's prefabbed for the Spotify age, with six of its ten songs previously released, leaving just four for fans to discover anew. It's not so much an album with a deeply considered build, but rather a neat container for playlistable songs." Tregoning also said "Pnau just wants to feel good all the time – subtlety be damned."

Cyclone Wehner from The Music said "Pnau's sixth album, Hyperbolic, diverges from Changa. It's pop, rather than festival-orientated, but it's still about communal celebration." Wehner said "Pnau are the Australian answer to Daft Punk."

Chris Lamaro from AAA Backstage said "Hyperbolic is a testament to Pnau's evolution, traversing from their roots in underground raves to the realms of disco-infused pop anthems, yet always anchored by their signature dancefloor essence, solidifying their position as electronic music maestros."

== Track listing ==
Hyperbolic track listing
No.	Title	Writer(s)	Length
1.	"AEIOU" (with Empire of the Sun)	Nick Littlemore; Sam Littlemore; Peter Mayes; Richard Boardman; Pablo Bowman; Luke Steele	3:15
2.	"The Hard Way" (with Khalid)	N. Littlemore; S. Littlemore; Mayers; Khalid Robinson	3:03
3.	"Solid Gold" (featuring Kira Divine and Marques Toliver)	N. Littlemore; S. Littlemore; Mayes	3:28
4.	"All the Time"	N. Littlemore; S. Littlemore; Mayes; James Abrahart; Janee Bennett; Sarah Hudson; Andrew Parcell	3:12
5.	"Stars" (with Bebe Rexha and Ozuna)	N. Littlemore; S. Littlemore; Mayes; Bennett; Bleta Rexha; Yazid Rivera; Juan Carlos Ozuna Rosado	2:51
6.	"You Know What I Need" (with Troye Sivan)	N. Littlemore; S. Littlemore; Mayes	2:50
7.	"Nostalgia"	N. Littlemore; Mayes; Amanda Ibanez; Samuel Roman	2:44
8.	"Passion Flower"	N. Littlemore; Mayes; Cleo Tighe	2:52
9.	"River" (with Ladyhawke)	N. Littlemore; S. Littlemore; Mayes; Phillipa Brown	3:20
10.	"So High" (featuring Emily Wurramara)	N. Littlemore; Mayes; Emily Blitner; Jonathan Sloan; Nancy Smyth	3:39
Total length:			31:14

== Personnel ==
Pnau

- Nick Littlemore – production
- Sam Littlemore – production
- Peter Mayes – production (all tracks), mixing (tracks 1–4, 7–10)

Additional contributors

- Donnie Sloan – production (track 10)
- Mike Marsh – mastering (tracks 1, 4, 7–10)
- Chris Gehringer – mastering (track 2)
- Sterling Sound – mastering (track 5)
- Randy Merrill – mastering (track 6)
- Serban Ghenea – mixing (tracks 5, 6)
- Mitch Allen – vocal production (track 5)
- Luke Steele – vocals (track 1)

== Charts ==
=== Weekly charts ===
Weekly chart performance for Hyperbolic
Chart (2024)	Peak position
Australian Albums (ARIA)	192
Australian Dance Albums (ARIA)	6
UK Dance Albums (Official Charts)	23

=== Year-end charts ===
Year-end chart performance for Hyperbolic
Chart (2024)	Position
Australian Dance Albums (ARIA)	50
