= Julian Palmer =

Australian ethnobotanist, writer and psychedelic researcher

Julian Palmer is an Australian ethnobotanist, writer and psychedelic researcher who created Changa, a DMT-infused smoking blend, in Australia between 2003 and 2004. From the mid-2000s, he promoted Changa internationally at festivals across Europe, Asia, Africa and South America. He has worked as an ayahuasca facilitator and appeared on Australian national broadcasters SBS and the ABC.

== Career ==
Active in Australian psychedelic culture since the early 2000s, Palmer has worked as an ayahuasca facilitator. He developed Changa as an alternative to smoking pure DMT crystal, which he found often left users overwhelmed. He advocates for "intelligent" blends and the "sub-breakthrough" experience as a therapeutic tool. St John describes him as expressing "a spiritual anarchist sensibility", favouring individual autonomy over structured ceremonial formats. From the mid-2000s, he promoted Changa across Europe, Asia, Africa and South America at festivals including Rainbow Serpent Festival and Portugal's Boom Festival — a period Vice characterised as "missionary work".

== Publications ==
His book Articulations: On The Utilisation and Meanings of Psychedelics (2014) was translated into Italian as Frammenti di un insegnamento psichedelico (Spazio Interiore, 2019).

== Media appearances ==
Palmer has appeared on Australian national broadcasters SBS and the ABC. In 2016, SBS's The Feed profiled him in a segment on ayahuasca in Australia, and he appeared on the network's Insight in 2022 for the episode "Illicit Medicine". In July 2022, the ABC's Four Corners featured him in "Psyched Up", an investigation into psychedelic therapy; in March 2024, the ABC issued a correction and apology regarding its coverage. Podcast appearances include Matt and Shane's Secret Podcast with Shane Gillis (2022), The Search with Spanian (2022), and Your Mate Tom Podcast (2017).

Since 2021, he has hosted the podcast Revelations With Julian Palmer.
