= Can't Get Better Than This =

Single by Parachute Youth
- B-side: "Awake Now"
- Released: 28 January 2012
- Recorded: 2011
- Genre: Alternative dance
- Length: 3:33
- Label: Sweat It Out
- Songwriters: Sam Littlemore, Mathew Gill, John Courtidis

"Can't Get Better Than This" is the debut single by Australian dance and electronic music duo Parachute Youth. It was written by Sam Littlemore, Mathew Gill and John Courtidis.

The song was released on 28 January 2012 in Australia, and charted in Belgium and Luxembourg in 2012.

== Music video ==
A music video to accompany the release of "Can't Get Better Than This" was first released on YouTube on 21 December 2011. It was filmed in the landlocked West African nation of Burkina Faso. The film clip samples scenes from an annual motorbike race in Ouagadougou, including images of riders passing the national monument "Monument des Héros Nationaux".

The video has a length of three minutes and forty seconds.

== Track listing ==
Digital download - Single
No.	Title	Length
1.	"Can't Get Better Than This" (Radio Edit)	3:33
2.	"Awake Now"	4:40
3.	"Can't Get Better Than This" (Sam La More Remix)	6:22
4.	"Can't Get Better Than This" (Original Version)	5:01

Digital download - Remixes
No.	Title	Length
1.	"Can't Get Better Than This" (Klüsse Remix)	4:52
2.	"Can't Get Better Than This" (Trumpdisco Remix)	5:19
3.	"Awake Now" (Airwolf Remix)	5:27
4.	"Can't Get Better Than This" (Punk Ninja Remix)	5:55
5.	"Can't Get Better Than This" (Ferrari Campari Edit)	7:16

== Chart performance ==
Chart (2012)	Peak position
Belgium (Ultratop 50 Flanders)	2
Belgium (Ultratop 50 Wallonia)	12
Luxembourg (Billboard)	6
Ukraine Airplay (TopHit)	32

== Release history ==
Region	Date	Format	Label
Australia	28 January 2012	Digital download - Single	Sweat It Out
Australia	30 May 2012	Digital download - Remixes	Sweat It Out

== Certifications ==
Certifications for "Can't Get Better Than This"
Region	Certification	Certified units/sales
Belgium (BRMA)	Gold	15,000^{*}
^{*} Sales figures based on certification alone.
