= Changa (song) =

Single by Pnau

from the album Changa
- Released: 11 May 2018
- Length: 3:25
- Label: Etcetc
- Songwriters: Nick Littlemore; Peter Mayes; Sam Littlemore

Pnau singles chronology
"Go Bang" (2017)	"Changa" (2018)	"Solid Gold" (2019)

Music video
- "Changa" on YouTube

"Changa" is a song by Pnau, released on 11 May 2018 as the third and final single from the band's fifth studio album, Changa (2017). The song features vocals from Kira Divine.

Upon release the band said "This song is an ode to all things multiverse. All that we see is but a dream within a dream. Come dream with us."

In December 2018, Billboard staff listed the Blanke remix as one of the 10 best dance remixes of 2018.

== Music video ==
The music video for "Changa" was filmed in Los Angeles, directed by Ben Kutsko from Miniac Films and starred vocalist Kira Divine. Lars Brandle from Billboard called it "a full-on trip which, like its two predecessors, follows the colourful journey of the conscious and unconscious world of DMT."

== Track listing ==
Digital download (remixes)

1. "Changa" – 3:25
2. "Changa" (Pirupa Remix) – 4:43
3. "Changa" (Jack Beats Remix) – 5:36
4. "Changa" (Jnthn Stein Remix) – 3:19
5. "Changa" (Blanke Remix) – 3:08
6. "Changa" (George Michelle Remix) – 4:53

== Charts ==
Chart performance for "Changa"
Chart (2018)	Peak position
Australia (ARIA)	151

== Release history ==
Release history and formats for "Changa"
Country	Date	Format	Label
Australia	11 May 2018	Digital download; streaming	Etcetc
