= Changa (drug) =

DMT-infused smoking blend

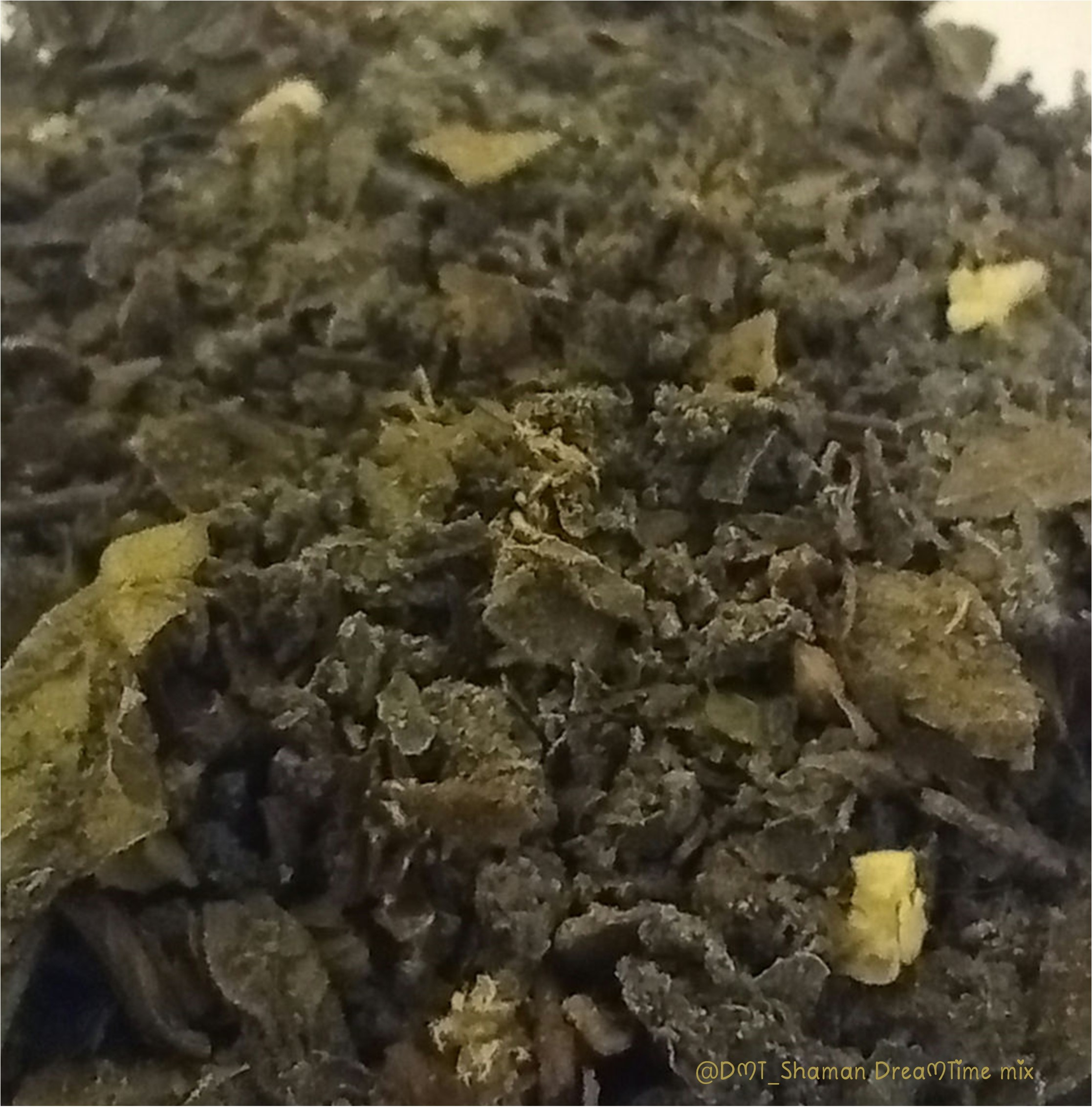
- Changa blend
- Source plant(s): Mimosa tenuiflora, Psychotria viridis, Diplopterys cabrerana, Acacia spp.; Banisteriopsis caapi; Peganum harmala
- Active ingredients: Dimethyltryptamine (DMT); Harmala alkaloids

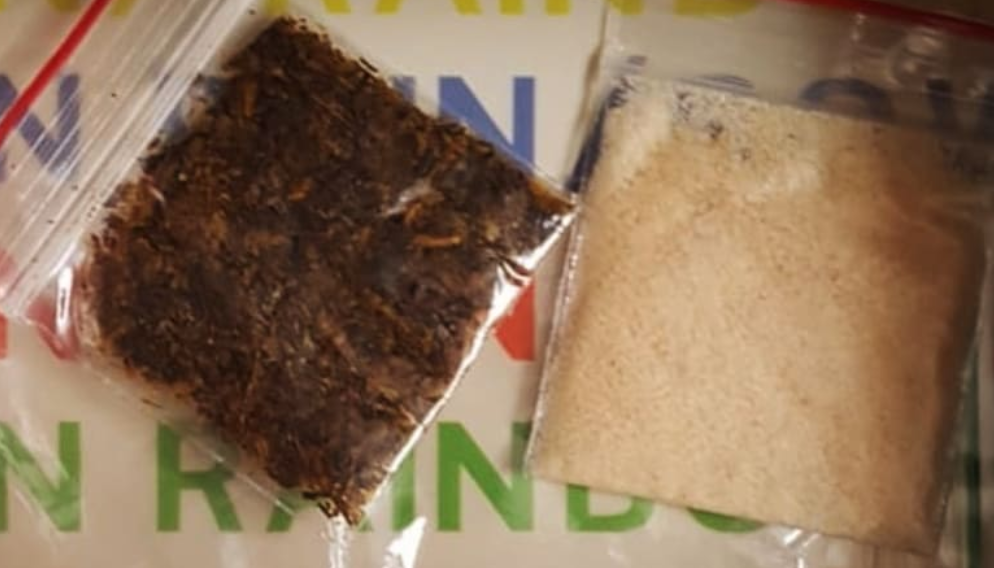
Changa smoking blend (left) and DMT freebase (right).

Changa (/ˈtʃæŋɡɑː/) is a blend of the psychedelic drug dimethyltryptamine (DMT) mixed with a monoamine oxidase inhibitor (MAOI) which is used by smoking. The addition of MAOIs extends the DMT experience in duration and intensity when compared with smoking DMT freebase alone. Typically, extracts from DMT-containing plants are combined with a blend of different MAOI-containing herbs, such as the ayahuasca vine, and/or leaf or harmala alkaloids from Peganum harmala ("Syrian rue") to create a mix that is 25 to 50% DMT.

== History ==
Changa was named and rediscovered by Australian Julian Palmer in 2003 and 2004. Originally the knowledge of blending DMT and MAOI’s comes from native cultures and can be traced as far back to 1200-400 BCE.

From the mid-2000s, Palmer promoted the blend internationally, introducing it at festivals and gatherings across Europe, Asia, Africa and South America. The 2008 Boom Festival in Portugal is often cited as a key moment in changa's spread beyond Australia.

== Etymology ==
The name "Changa" is attributed to Palmer, who has said it came to him during an ayahuasca session.

The intended pronunciation is /ˈtʃæŋɡɑː/ (CHANG-ah), though regional variations exist.

== Composition ==
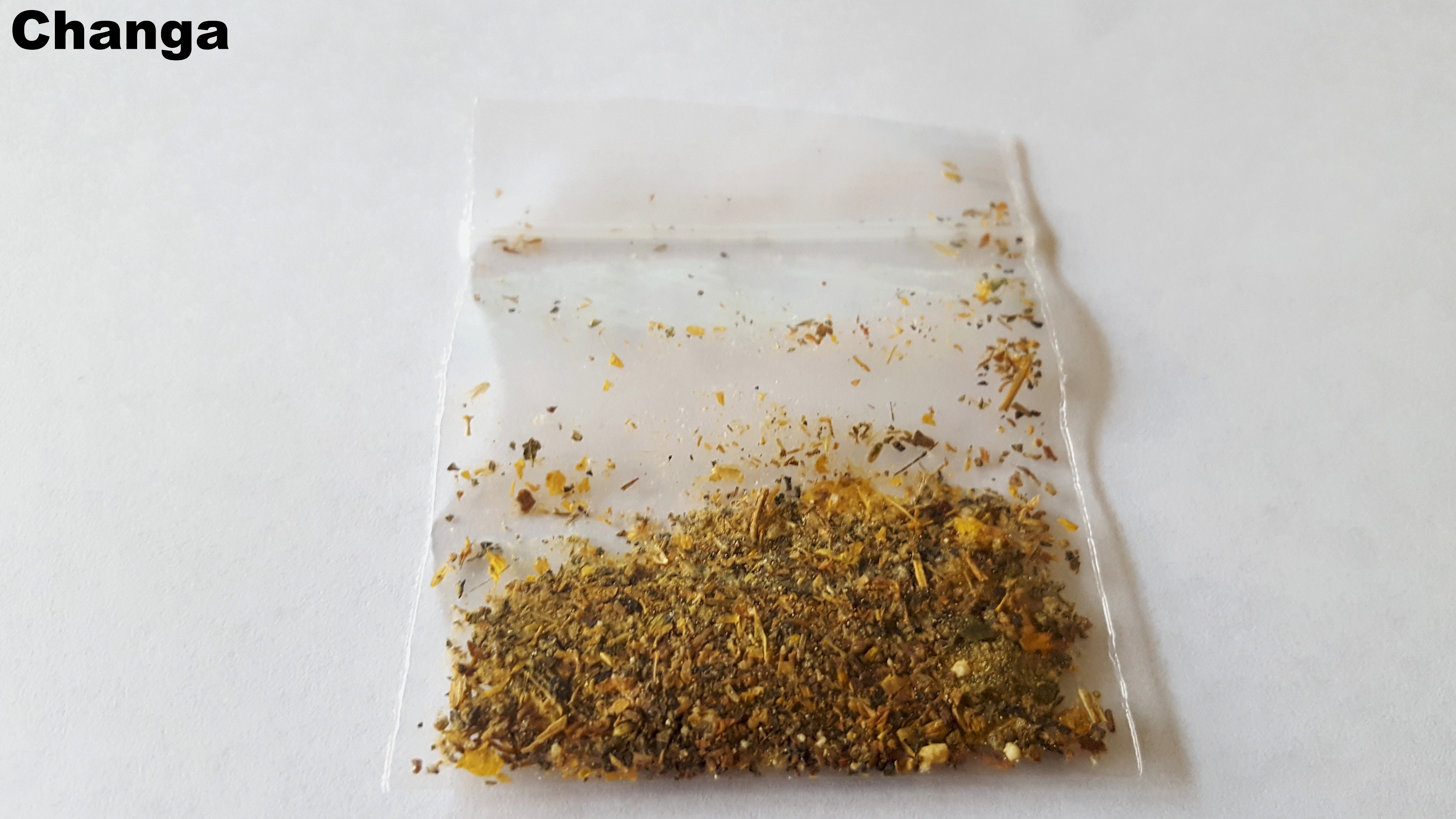
Changa sample

Changa consists of two primary components: dimethyltryptamine (DMT) and a monoamine oxidase inhibitor (MAOI), typically derived from plant sources such as Banisteriopsis caapi or Peganum harmala (Syrian rue). DMT-containing plants used in changa include Mimosa tenuiflora (formerly Mimosa hostilis), Psychotria viridis (chacruna), Diplopterys cabrerana (chaliponga), and Acacia species such as Acacia acuminata.

Blend compositions vary widely, with DMT concentrations typically ranging from 25 to 50 percent. Doses vary substantially from one sample to the next depending on ingredients and ratios.

Palmer's "classic" formulation consists of:

- 30% Banisteriopsis caapi vine and/or leaf
- 20% mullein
- 20% passionflower
- 20% peppermint
- 5% calendula
- 5% blue lotus

Palmer has noted that while many herbs can be used, the MAOI component "activates" other herbs in the blend, and new additions may have unpredictable effects.

== Properties and effects ==
Changa has a duration of 15 to 30 minutes. This is in contrast to ayahuasca, which usually lasts for 3 to 5 hours.

== In popular culture ==
Australian Electronic dance music (EDM) trio Pnau titled their November 2017 album Changa in homage to the substance. It reached a peak of number 11 on the ARIA charts.

The 2022 Australian film Everything in Between opens with a scene in which the protagonist smokes what is implied to be changa, leading into a hallucinogenic experience.
