= Go Bang (song) =

Single by Pnau

from the album Changa
- Released: 27 October 2017
- Genre: Electronic, Dance-pop
- Label: Etcetc
- Songwriters: Nick Littlemore; Peter Mayes; Sam Littlemore; Luke Steele

Pnau singles chronology
"Chameleon" (2016)	"Go Bang" (2017)	"Changa" (2018)

Music video
- "Go Bang" on YouTube

"Go Bang" is a song by Pnau, released in October 2017 as the second single from the band's fifth studio album, Changa (2017). The song features vocals from Kira Divine.

Digital remixes were released on 8 December 2017.

At the ARIA Music Awards of 2018, the song was nominated for five awards, winning Best Dance Release.

At the APRA Music Awards of 2019, the song was nominated for Dance Work of the Year and Most Played Australian Work.

== Reception ==
Hayden Davis from Pile Rats said: "with the mixture of Divine's uplifting vocals with the addictive house charm of Pnau proving itself to be a winning combo once again. It's light and refreshing – perfect for chill, at-home listening – but the catchiness of Pnau's bass-driven beat also makes it an A+ club thumper which will no doubt dominate as we hit the warmer months much like "Chameleon" did last year."

== Music video ==
The music was produced and directed by "Toby & Pete". They state "We wanted to take the viewer on a journey through the desert, meet the Fire Goddess KIRA and be hit with complete hyper-real psychedelia".

The video uses extensive CGI and special effects. As the video starts, the camera zooms onto a female figure. The figure is charcoal black with parts of her skin glowing like lips and orange glowing hair. She is standing in the middle of a field of presumably, extra-terrestrial plants. As the video goes on, the plants begin to pulsate their light in accordance with the beat. More of the female figures appear and dance to the rhythm of the song. As the video goes on, a panoramic shattered glass appears showing women posing with their eyes closed. The glass dissipates and the female figure's hand shows up center-screen. It also shows her sitting down in a meditative position. Later on, she is seen dancing in a pink floating temple, more female figures appear again. The temple begins to gyrate on its axis, and the floor the figure is dancing on breaks into squares for a brief moment. More female figures are seen dancing. As the video ends, a distorted but patterned picture appears and the song's title and artist show up.

== Track listing ==
Digital download

1. "Go Bang" – 3:09

Digital download (remixes)

1. "Go Bang" – 3:09
2. "Go Bang" (Friend Within Extended Remix) – 4:42
3. "Go Bang" (KC Lights Extended Remix) – 6:02
4. "Go Bang" (Flash 89 Extended Remix) – 5:53
5. "Go Bang" (extended mix) – 4:22

== Charts ==
=== Weekly charts ===
Chart (2017–18)	Peak position
Australia (ARIA)	9
Australia Club (ARIA)	1
Australia Dance (ARIA)	1
US Hot Dance/Electronic Songs (Billboard)	40

=== Year-end charts ===
Chart (2018)	Position
Australia (ARIA)	43
Australia Club (ARIA)	4
Australia Dance (ARIA)	6
US Dance/Mix Show Airplay (Billboard)	11

== Certifications ==
Region	Certification	Certified units/sales
Australia (ARIA)	5× Platinum	350,000^{‡}
New Zealand (RMNZ)	Platinum	30,000^{‡}
^{‡} Sales+streaming figures based on certification alone.

== Release history ==
Country	Date	Format	Label	Version
Australia	27 October 2017	Digital download, streaming	Etcetc	Original
Australia	8 December 2017	Digital download, streaming	Etcetc	Remixes
