= Good Morning to the Night =

Remix album by Elton John vs Pnau
- Released: 13 July 2012
- Recorded: 1969–2012
- Genre: Synth-pop; nu-disco; rock
- Length: 28:15
- Label: Mercury; Casablanca (US)
- Producer: Sam Littlemore; Gus Dudgeon; Clive Franks; Elton John; Steve Brown; Thom Bell

Elton John chronology
Gnomeo & Juliet Soundtrack (2011)	Good Morning to the Night (2012)	The Diving Board (2013)

Pnau chronology
Soft Universe (2011)	Good Morning to the Night (2012)	Changa (2017)

Singles from Good Morning to the Night
- 1. "Good Morning to the Night" Released: 6 July 2012; 2. "Sad" Released: 20 July 2012

Good Morning to the Night is the first remix album by Elton John and Pnau, released in July 2012. The album's tracks are created from samples of various early John songs mixed together to form completely new songs. The album debuted at number 1 on the UK Albums Chart, marking John's first chart-topper since The Very Best of Elton John in 1990.

== Reception ==
Professional ratings
Review scores
Source	Rating
AllMusic	3.5/5 stars
The Guardian	4/5 stars
Mediacorp xinmsn (MSN Singapore)	4.5/5 stars
NME	3.5/5 stars

Phil Mongredien from The Guardian wrote "Australian dance duo Pnau have been mentored by Elton John for five years, and it's with his blessing that they have reimagined his early 70s output by splicing together snippets of songs to create something wholly new and oddly affecting... Refreshingly unpredictable, this is a blueprint for what remix albums should aspire to." Joseph Standard from NME opined that "The results range from danceable to unnerving and give off an atmosphere of ghostly melancholy that subtly subverts Elton's reputation as a cosy British institution." Stephen Thomas Erlewine from AllMusic felt that "Good Morning to the Night is not a hits-on-parade set [and] is a relief, and even if it's not necessarily the kind of music that would make it into regular rotation, it's inventive and fun, which is more than enough for a project like this."

== Track listing ==
No.	Title	Length
1.	"Good Morning to the Night"	3:21
2.	"Sad"	3:21
3.	"Black Icy Stare"	3:12
4.	"Foreign Fields"	3:33
5.	"Telegraph to the Afterlife"	4:45
6.	"Phoenix"	3:30
7.	"Karmatron"	2:41
8.	"Sixty"	3:52
Total length:		28:15

Deluxe edition bonus tracks
No.	Title	Length
9.	"Sad" (Seamus Haji Remix)	7:02
10.	"Sad" (The 2 Bears Remix)	9:04
11.	"Good Morning to the Night" (Siege 'To the Night' Remix)	6:16
12.	"Good Morning to the Night" (Cahill Remix)	5:51
13.	"Good Morning to the Night" (Melé Remix)	4:41
Total length:		61:09

== Samples ==
1. "Good Morning to the Night" includes elements from the following original Elton John sound recordings:

- "Philadelphia Freedom"
- "Mona Lisas and Mad Hatters"
- "Funeral for a Friend/Love Lies Bleeding"
- "Tonight"
- "Gulliver/It's Hay Chewed"
- "Sixty Years On"
- "Goodbye Yellow Brick Road"
- "Someone Saved My Life Tonight"

2. "Sad" includes elements from:

- "Nice and Slow"
- "Crazy Water"
- "Curtains"
- "Sorry Seems to Be the Hardest Word"
- "Friends"

3. "Black Icy Stare" includes elements from:

- "Cold Highway"
- "You're So Static"
- "Solar Prestige a Gammon"

4. "Foreign Fields" includes elements from:

- "Pinky"
- "Someone Saved My Life Tonight"
- "High Flying Bird"
- "Sweet Painted Lady"
- "Cage the Songbird"
- "Chameleon"

5. "Telegraph to the Afterlife" includes elements from:

- "Harmony"
- "We All Fall in Love Sometimes"
- "Funeral for a Friend"
- "Sweet Painted Lady"
- "I've Seen That Movie Too"
- "Love Song"
- "Indian Sunset"

6. "Phoenix" includes elements from:

- "Grey Seal"
- "Are You Ready for Love"
- "Bennie and the Jets"
- "Someone Saved My Life Tonight"
- "Where to Now St Peter?"
- "Funeral for a Friend"
- "Border Song"
- "Country Love Song"
- "Three Way Love Affair"

7. "Karmatron" includes elements from:

- "Madman Across the Water"
- "Funeral for a Friend"
- "Stinker"
- "The Ballad of Danny Bailey (1909–1934)"
- "Tonight"
- "One Horse Town"
- "Screw You (Young Man's Blues)"

8. "Sixty" includes elements from:

- "Sixty Years On"
- "Sixty Years On (Live in Australia)"
- "Sixty Years On (17-11-70)"
- "Indian Sunset"

== Charts ==
Chart (2012)	Peak position
Australian Albums (ARIA)	40
Belgian Albums (Ultratop Flanders)	188
Croatian Albums Chart	11
Scottish Albums (OCC)	4
UK Albums (OCC)	1

== Release history ==
Region	Date	Format	Label	Catalogue
Australia	13 July 2012	CD, LP, Digital download	Mercury Records	3707164
North America	2012	CD, LP, DD	Casablanca	B0016987
