= Raptor house =

Venezuelan music genre

- Stylistic origins: House; techno; electronica; tribal house; reggaeton; salsa; bubbling; Dutch house; kuduro; UK funky
- Cultural origins: Early 1990s - 2000s, Caracas - Venezuela
- Typical instruments: Drum machine; keyboard; personal computer; sampler; sequencer; synthesizer; vocals

Raptor house (also known as Changa tuki) is a lifestyle, dance and music genre derived from electronic music that originated in Caracas, Venezuela in early-1990s. It was a strong trend and present in parties until the late-2000s. The Changa culture was mainstream in Venezuela along with other genres such as reggaeton, salsa, and emo. Its dancers and supporters are known as tuki(s). The dance that accompanies it is a style of ghetto dance.

They had a particular style of clothing that mostly consisted of tight red pants, sleeveless shirts, caps that almost covered their eyes, Nike shoes in the style of the Air Jordan, and the use of hydrogen peroxide to dye their beards and tips of their hair. An urban culture that in its great majority was related to the poor classes and especially to the trickery and a kind of thug.

The creators of this style and the greatest DJs were DJ Baba and DJ Irvin, other DJs that could be mentioned were Pacheko, Pocz. Of the most remembered dancers we can mention Elber El Maestro among others.

Portuguese DJs Buraka Som Sistema liked the raptor house and played many songs of this style and also compose. American DJ Scoop DeVille also expressed how he liked this movement saying that "he has developed a true passion for this".
