= Embrace (Pnau song) =

Single by Pnau

from the album Pnau
- Released: June 2008
- Genre: Electronic, house
- Label: Etcetc
- Songwriters: Nick Littlemore; Peter Mayes; Sam Littlemore; Pip Brown
- Producer: Pnau

Pnau singles chronology
| "Baby" (2008) | "Embrace" (2008) | "The Truth" (2011) |

"Embrace" is a song by Australian Electronic house band, Pnau. "Embrace" was released in August 2008 as the third and final single from the band's third studio album, Pnau (2007). The song was co-written by and features uncredited vocals by New Zealand singer-songwriter Ladyhawke. "Embrace" peaked at number 55 on the ARIA Charts.

The song was supported with an "Embrace Tour" along the Australian East Coast across August 2008.

== Reception ==
In 2015, the song was listed at number 60 in In the Mix's 100 Greatest Australian Dance Tracks of All Time with Dave Ruby Howe saying "'Embrace' features the vocals of then-ubiquitous Kiwi import Ladyhawke, who stirs and soars as Littlemore and Mayes hit the euphoria button".

== Track listing ==
CD single

1. "Embrace" (Radio edit) - 3:34
2. "Embrace" (Fred Falke & Miami Horror remix) - 6:06
3. "Embrace" (Chicken Lips remix) - 6:46
4. "Embrace" (Album version) - 5:36

== Charts ==
| Chart (2008) | Peak position |
|---|---|
| Australia (ARIA) | 55 |

== Release history ==
| Country | Date | Format | Label | Catalogue |
|---|---|---|---|---|
| Australia | June 2008 | CD Single | Etcetc | ETCETCD5002 |
