= Parachute Youth =

2011–2014 Australian indie house duo

Parachute Youth was the musical project of Mathew Kvon and Johnny Castro (John Courtidis), a duo originating from Australia in December 2011. Their music is indie house, and their labels include Sweat It Out, Warner Music, and Ultra Music.

Their first single, "Can't Get Better Than This", was released on 28 January 2012 in Australia, and charted in Belgium and Luxembourg in 2012. In 2013 they moved to London to continue their career. They released a second single, "Runaway", on 19 November 2013.

The pair split up on 4 February 2014, with Castro commencing a solo project, Yeah Boy, signing to Atlantic Records/Warner Music. He released an EP "Can't Get Enough" on 5 May 2014.
