= Again (Pnau album) =

Studio album by Pnau
- Released: 17 October 2003
- Genres: Electro, acid techno
- Length: 73:22
- Labels: Warner Music Australia, Underwater Records
- Producer: Pnau

Pnau chronology
Sambanova (1999)	Again (2003)	Pnau (2007)

Alternative cover
- UK album cover

Singles from Again
- 1. "Blood Lust" Released: 2002 (Australia); 2. "We Love the Fresh Kills"/"Again" Released: October 2003 (12"); 3. "Enuffs Enuff" Released: March 2004 (12")

Again is the second studio album by Australian dance music duo, Pnau. The album was released in October 2003 on Warner Music Australia.

== Track listing ==
Warner Music Australia version

1. "We Love the Fresh Kills" – 4:46
2. "Again" – 5:26
3. "Super Giants" – 4:32
4. "The Hunted" – 4:23
5. "Fear & Love" – 6:05
6. "Collision Course" – 2:19
7. "In the Valley" – 6:18
8. "Enuff's Enuff" – 4:45
9. "Bloodlust" – 3:26
10. "Crystal Science" – 2:46
11. "Foreigner" – 1:24
12. "Lovers" – 4:24
13. "Bubbles 'n' Mum" – 22:43

Underwater Records UK Reissue

1. "Foreigner" – 1:24
2. "We Love the Fresh Kills" – 4:46
3. "Donnie Donnie Darko" – 3:27
4. "Again" – 5:26
5. "Super Giants" – 4:32
6. "The Hunted" – 4:23
7. "In the Valley" – 6:18
8. "Fear & Love" – 6:05
9. "Enuff's Enuff" – 4:45
10. "Bloodlust" – 3:26
11. "Lovers" – 4:24
12. "Crystal Science" – 2:46
13. "Bubbles 'n' Mum" – 1:09
14. "The Last Track" – 9:28

== Charts ==
Weekly chart performance for Again
Chart (2003)	Peak position
Australian Albums (ARIA)	103

== Release history ==
Region	Date	Format	Label	Catalogue
Australia	17 October 2003	CD	Warner Music Australia	2564608832
United Kingdom	2006	CD	Underwater Records	H2O071CD
