= Good Morning to the Night (song) =

2012 song by Elton John and Pnau

Single by Elton John, Pnau

from the album Good Morning to the Night
- Released: 6 July 2012
- Length: 3:21
- Label: Mercury Records, Universal Music Australia
- Producer(s): Pnau

Elton John singles chronology
"If It Wasn't for Bad" (2011)	"Good Morning to the Night" (2012)	"Sad" (2012)

Pnau singles chronology
"Everybody" (2012)	"Good Morning to the Night" (2012)	"Sad" (2012)

"Good Morning to the Night" is a song by British musician Elton John and Australian electronic dance duo Pnau. It was released in Australia on 6 July 2012 as the lead single from the album of the same name. In November 2012, John and Pnau performed the song live on The X Factor Australia. The song peaked at number 71 on the ARIA charts.

The song incorporates elements from the following original Elton John sound recordings: "Philadelphia Freedom", "Mona Lisas and Mad Hatters", "Funeral for a Friend/Love Lies Bleeding", "Tonight", "Gulliver/It's Hay Chewed", "Sixty Years On", "Goodbye Yellow Brick Road", and "Someone Saved My Life Tonight".

== Reception ==
In an album review, Phil Mongredien from The Guardian said, "The dazzling title track combines eight of Elton's lesser-known pieces to create an uplifting club anthem – in the vein of Modjo's 'Lady' – that seems a sure-fire summer hit."

== Track listings ==
1 track

1. "Good Morning to the Night" – 3:30

CD single

1. "Good Morning to the Night" (Cahill remix) – 3:30
2. "Good Morning to the Night" (Album version) – 3:21

== Charts ==
Chart (2012)	Peak position
Australia (ARIA Charts)	71
US Dance Chart (Billboard)	30

== Release history ==
Country	Date	Format	Label	Catalogue
Australia	6 July 2016	Digital download	Mercury Records/Universal Music Australia	3710987
Various	2016	CD Single	Mercury	
