= Baby (Pnau song) =

2008 single by Pnau

Single by Pnau

from the album Pnau
- Released: 3 March 2008
- Genre: Electronic, house
- Label: Etcetc
- Songwriters: Nick Littlemore; Peter Mayes; Sam Littlemore
- Producer: Pnau

Pnau singles chronology
"Wild Strawberries" (2007)	"Baby" (2008)	"Embrace" (2008)

Music video
- "Baby" on YouTube

"Baby" is a song by Australian electronic house band Pnau. "Baby" was released on 3 March 2008 as the second single from the band's third studio album, Pnau (2007). The song peaked at number 34 on the Australian Singles Chart and became the band's first top-40 single.

At the ARIA Music Awards of 2008, the song was nominated for Best Video.

The song gained further attention in 2010, when the Breakbot remix of the song was added into the video game Gran Turismo 5 as one of the songs that play in the pre- and post-race menus.

In 2013, French electronic duo Faul & Wad Ad released "Changes" which samples the refrain from "Baby".

In 2015, the song was listed at number 38 in In the Mix's "100 Greatest Australian Dance Tracks of All Time" with Lachlan Kanoniuk said "'Baby' stands as a cute, humble artefact from the weird and wonderful indie dance explosion of the mid-to-late 2000s".

== Music video ==
Baby’s accompanying video has the members of Pnau interacting with the characters from the cover artwork in a white backdrop with cylinders with a group of children dressed up as ghosts, singing the song. A group of humans can be seen dressed up as the characters as well. Pnau are also shown playing the instruments, including a side whistle. As the video finishes, all the characters gather around in the same scene as colorful balloons are shown flying.

== Track listing ==
CD single

1. "Baby" (Radio edit)
2. "Baby" (Breakbot remix)
3. "Baby" (The Aston Shuffle 'Just Woah' remix)
4. "Wild Strawberries"

== Charts ==
Chart (2008)	Peak position
Australia (ARIA)	34

== Release history ==
Country	Date	Format	Label	Catalogue	Ref.
Australia	3 March 2008	CD single	Etcetc	ETCETCD5001	
Australia	2008	12-inch vinyl	Etcetc	ETCETC12002	
