= Sad (Elton John and Pnau song) =

Single by Elton John, Pnau

from the album Good Morning to the Night
- Released: 20 July 2012
- Length: 3:21
- Label: Mercury Records
- Producer(s): Pnau

Elton John singles chronology
"Good Morning to the Night" (2012)	"Sad" (2012)	"Home Again" (2013)

Pnau singles chronology
"Good Morning to the Night" (2012)	"Sad" (2012)	"Changes" (2013)

"Sad" is a song by British musician Elton John and Australian electronic dance duo Pnau. It was released in the United Kingdom on 20 July 2012 as the second and final single from the album Good Morning to the Night. In November 2012, John and Pnau performed the song live on The X Factor Australia.

The song incorporates elements from the following original Elton John sound recordings: "Nice and Slow", "Crazy Water", "Curtains", "Sorry Seems to Be the Hardest Word" and "Friends".

== Track listings ==
1. "Sad" – 3:21
2. "Sad" (The 2 Bears Remix) – 9:01

== Charts ==
Chart (2012)	Peak position
UK Singles (OCC)	48

== Release history ==
Country	Date	Format	Label	Catalogue
United Kingdom	20 July 2012	Digital download	Mercury Records	GBUM71202593
Worldwide	9 October 2012	Digital download	Mercury Records	
