= Changa, Pakistan =

Changa
- Town
- Location within Pakistan
- Coordinates: 33.19°N 73.22°E
- Country: Pakistan
- Province: (Islamabad Capital Territory) Islamabad C.T
- Elevation: 495 m (1,624 ft)
- Time zone: UTC+5 (PST)

Changa is a town in the Islamabad Capital Territory of Pakistan. It is located at 33° 19' 20N 73° 22' 55E with an altitude of 495 metres (1627 feet).
