= Spanian =

Australian crime figure and internet personality

- Born: Anthony Lees; 1985 (age 40–41); Woolloomooloo, Sydney

YouTube information
- Channel: Spanian
- Years active: 2018–present
- Subscribers: 1.3 million
- Views: 252 million
- Last updated: 25 October 2026
- Website: spanianofficial.com

Anthony Lees (born 1985), better known as Spanian, is an Australian social media influencer, entrepreneur, drill rapper and former criminal.

== Early life ==
Lees grew up in Woolloomooloo in Sydney. He had a troubled early life, developing a heroin addiction in his teenage years and serving a number of custodial sentences at Cobham Youth Justice Centre for crimes including a school siege using a knife (28 days), a break and enter (100 days), and a ramraid on an ATM (six months). While serving one of these sentences, inmates started calling Lees "Spaniard", because his father is half-Spanish; eventually, the nickname was shortened to "Spanian".

His first adult sentence was in 2004, where he was sentenced to Parklea Correctional Centre for five months for stealing a bag. During his adult years, Lees was tried and convicted of numerous crimes, including armed robbery, causing grievous bodily harm with intent, and reckless wounding (pled down from the initial charge of attempted murder). His final conviction in 2011 was for operating a criminal group that dealt drugs and recruited underaged children, leading to an eight-year sentence. In all, Lees spent thirteen years in prison.

== Career ==
After his release from Bathurst Correctional Centre in 2017, Lees embarked on a new career as a drill rapper and a YouTube content creator. His YouTube series Into the Hood, in which he travels around Australia and the world to visit neighbourhoods widely considered dangerous and crime-riddled, became "incredibly successful" and transformed him into an "eshay influencer". Additionally, he hosted a podcast called The Search, interviewing former-criminals, rappers and other public figures. In 2022, Hachette published his autobiography, titled Spanian: The Unfiltered Hood Life, co-written with Christopher Kevin Au.

In March 2024, during Sydney's WorldPride celebrations, Lees was dropped by his label One Day Entertainment, a hip-hop collective, after a "series of homophobic and transphobic rants" were posted on Instagram by Lees in February. Fellow rappers, including Mallrat and Urthboy, condemned his comments. Following the controversy, Hachette dropped Lees from their roster and his autobiography became unavailable for purchase. The same month, Lees filmed an Into the Hood video in the Brisbane suburb of Logan. Crowds gathered and the event spun "out-of-control" and led to three police cars being damaged. Two men were charged; no charges were laid on Lees. The following month, police arrested and charged Lees with "one count of instigating the commission of a simple offence" while he was filming an Into the Hood video in Bridgewater, Tasmania. The video's filming, entitled "Inside The Hoods of Hobart", attracted large crowds of locals, with police alleging that hooning, public order, and damage to property offences took place. While the charges against Lees were eventually dropped, police charged several other people, seizing a number of vehicles. Police alleged that three of their cars were damaged and two officers were assaulted.

In October 2024, Lees opened his first branded kebab truck, Spanian's Kebabs, on Parramatta Road, Sydney. The kebabs went "viral" on social media and now operate on a franchising model, with seven trucks operating as of July 2025. In May 2025, a Spanian's Kebabs truck in Preston, Melbourne burned down in a suspected arson attack.

== Discography ==
=== Studio albums ===
Title	Album details
One Out	Released: 26 June 2020; Format: Download

=== EPs ===
Title	Extended play details
2 Out	Released: 30 June 2020; Format: Download

=== Singles ===
Title	Year
"The Six"	2020
"Waste Em" (featuring Twisted Insane)	2020
"Back It Up"	2020
"Illchay"	2020
"Hood Rambo"	2021
"Hood Oos"	2021
"Melvin Manhoef"	2021
"The Ruckus"	2021

== Bibliography ==
- Spanian: The Unfiltered Hood Life. Hachette Australia. 1 December 2021. ISBN 978-0-7336-4813-7.
