= Changes (Faul & Wad Ad song) =

Single by Faul & Wad Ad vs. Pnau
- Released: 15 November 2013
- Recorded: 2013
- Genre: Deep house; tropical house
- Length: 5:42
- Label: Four
- Songwriters: Nick Littlemore; Peter Mayes; Sam Littlemore
- Producers: Faul & Wad Ad

Pnau singles chronology
"Sad" (2012)	"Changes" (2013)	"Chameleon" (2016)

Music video
- "Changes" on YouTube

"Changes" is a song by French electronic duo Faul & Wad Ad. It was released in November 2013 as a single and reached number-one in Belgium and Germany, while it also reached the top 10 in many other European countries, including the top 3 in the United Kingdom. The song samples the refrain of Australian electronic duo Pnau's song "Baby", which itself was a top 40 hit in Australia. It was used in an advert for the Mercedes C-Class, while the refrain was also used in the video game Gran Turismo 5.

== Background ==
In 2008, Pnau released the track "Baby", sung by a children's choir on their self-titled album. Pnau is a side project of Nick Littlemore of Australian duo Empire of the Sun and of Peter Mayes. The track "Baby" was written by Nick and Sam Littlemore and Peter Mayes and was produced by Sam Littlemore. The song appeared in the 2014 video game Forza Horizon 2, and also appeared in the Bonus collection edition of FIFA 14, also released in 2014.

== Track listing ==
Promo

1. "Changes" – 3:20

Maxi CD

1. "Changes" (Radio Mix) – 3:22
2. "Changes" (Original Mix) – 5:43

Various remixes include "Changes" (Tocadisco's Sunny LA Remix), "Changes" (Stefan Dabruck Remix) and "Changes" (Robin Schulz Remix). "Changes" was also mixed with Dimitri Vegas and Like Mike's track "Project T", performed in Tomorrowland 2014 in Belgium.

== Charts ==
=== Weekly charts ===
Weekly chart performance for "Changes"
Chart (2013–2014)	Peak position
Austria (Ö3 Austria Top 40)	2
Belgium (Ultratop 50 Flanders)	3
Belgium (Ultratop Flanders Dance)	1
Belgium (Ultratop 50 Wallonia)	6
Belgium (Ultratop Wallonia Dance)	5
Canada Hot 100 (Billboard)	71
CIS Airplay (TopHit)	1
Czech Republic Airplay (ČNS IFPI)	1
Czech Republic Singles Digital (ČNS IFPI)	8
Finland (Suomen virallinen lista)	18
France (SNEP)	9
Germany (GfK)	1
Greece Digital Songs (Billboard)	3
Hungary (Dance Top 40)	2
Hungary (Rádiós Top 40)	2
Hungary (Single Top 40)	4
Ireland (IRMA)	24
Italy (FIMI)	3
Luxembourg Digital Songs (Billboard)	2
Poland Airplay (ZPAV)	1
Poland Dance (ZPAV)	4
Netherlands (Dutch Top 40)	15
Netherlands (Single Top 100)	14
Russia Airplay (TopHit)	1
Scottish Singles Sales (Official Charts)	2
Slovakia Airplay (ČNS IFPI)	2
Slovakia Singles Digital (ČNS IFPI)	41
Slovenia (SloTop50)	8
Spain (Promusicae)	2
Sweden (Sverigetopplistan)	47
Switzerland (Schweizer Hitparade)	4
UK Dance (Official Charts)	2
UK Singles (Official Charts)	3
Ukraine Airplay (TopHit)	3
US Dance Airplay (Billboard)	16

2025 weekly chart performance for "Changes"
Chart (2025)	Peak position
Moldova Airplay (TopHit)	41

=== Monthly charts ===
2025 monthly chart performance for "Changes"
Chart (2025)	Peak position
Moldova Airplay (TopHit)	74

=== Year-end charts ===
2013 year-end chart performance for "Changes"
Chart (2013)	Position
Germany (Official German Charts)	70
Italy (FIMI)	21
Poland (ZPAV)	5

2014 year-end chart performance for "Changes"
Chart (2014)	Position
Austria (Ö3 Austria Top 40)	31
Belgium (Ultratop Flanders)	24
Belgium (Ultratop Wallonia)	20
France (SNEP)	27
Germany (Official German Charts)	28
Hungary (Dance Top 40)	3
Hungary (Rádiós Top 40)	4
Hungary (Single Top 40)	10
Netherlands (Dutch Top 40)	70
Netherlands (Single Top 100)	67
Russia Airplay (TopHit)	2
Slovenia (SloTop50)	49
Spain (PROMUSICAE)	4
Switzerland (Schweizer Hitparade)	11
Ukraine Airplay (TopHit)	2
UK Singles (OCC)	76

2015 year-end chart performance for "Changes"
Chart (2015)	Position
Hungary (Dance Top 40)	85

== Certifications and sales ==
Region	Certification	Certified units/sales
Austria (IFPI Austria)	Gold	15,000^{*}
Belgium (BRMA)	Gold	15,000^{*}
Canada (Music Canada)	Platinum	80,000^{‡}
France	—	51,400
Germany (BVMI)	Platinum	300,000^{‡}
Italy (FIMI)	2× Platinum	60,000^{*}
Spain (Promusicae)	Platinum	60,000^{‡}
Sweden (GLF)	Gold	20,000^{‡}
Switzerland (IFPI Switzerland)	Platinum	30,000^{^}
United Kingdom (BPI)	Platinum	600,000^{‡}
^{*} Sales figures based on certification alone.^{^} Shipments figures based on certification alone.^{‡} Sales+streaming figures based on certification alone.
