= Soft Universe =

Studio album by Pnau
- Released: 22 July 2011
- Genre: Electronic rock, synth-pop
- Length: 46:50
- Label: Etcetc
- Producer: Pnau, Scott Cutler, Anne Preven

Pnau chronology
| Pnau (2007) | Soft Universe (2011) | Good Morning to the Night (2012) |

Singles from Soft Universe
- 1. "The Truth" Released: February 2011; 2. "Solid Ground" Released: June 2011; 3. "Unite Us" Released: January 2012; 4. "Everybody" Released: May 2012 (promo)

Soft Universe is the fourth studio album by Australian electronic act Pnau. The album was released in July 2011 by Etcetc and peaked at number 13 on the ARIA Charts; becoming the act's highest charting album to date. The album featured a new "rock-anthem" sound unlike the duo's straightforward electronic dance sound for which they were previously known.

At the ARIA Music Awards of 2011, the album was nominated for Best Dance Release.

== Reception ==
The album received generally positive reviews, with some claiming the release to be a solid follow-up to not only Pnau, but also to Empire of the Sun's Walking on a Dream and Groove Armada's Black Light, both of which featured heavy involvement from Littlemore. Many critics, however, expressed mixed feelings concerning the new sound and direction, mostly in comparison to the duo's "quirky" sound and themes of their 2007 release.

== Track listing ==
1. "Everybody" – 4:53
2. "Solid Ground" – 4:00
3. "Unite Us" – 4:33
4. "Twist of Fate" – 4:01
5. "The Truth" – 4:55
6. "Glimpse" – 4:19
7. "Epic Fail" – 4:10
8. "Better Way" – 3:29
9. "Something Special" – 3:52
10. "Waiting for You" – 4:26
11. "True to You" – 3:57

== Charts ==
| Chart (2011) | Peak position |
|---|---|
| Australian Albums (ARIA) | 13 |

== Release history ==
| Region | Date | Format | Label | Catalogue |
|---|---|---|---|---|
| Australia | 22 July 2011 | CD | etcetc | ETCETCD027 |
| Europe | 2011 | CD | Ministry of Sound | MOSART5CDPR |
