= Sambanova (album) =

Studio album by Pnau
- Released: July 1999
- Genres: Deep house; disco
- Length: 73:27
- Labels: Peking Duck, Warner
- Producer: Nick Littlemore

Pnau chronology
Sambanova (1999)	Again (2003)

Sambanova
- 2001 re-release

Singles from Sambanova
- 1. "Need Your Lovin' Baby" Released: February 2000; 2. "Follow Me" Released: July 2001

Sambanova is the debut album by Australian dance music duo Pnau, released in July 1999 on the independent Peking Duck label. However, the album was pulled from record stores due to uncleared samples; Warner Music Australasia re-released it in August 2001 with a different track listing, and it peaked in the top 40 of the ARIA Albums Chart.

A deep house and disco album, Sambanova won an ARIA Music Award for Best Dance Release at the ARIA Music Awards of 2000.

== Background ==
Pnau released their debut album Sambanova in July 1999 under the small independent Peking Duck label. It was recorded in a bedroom studio and Pnau declared they only expected to sell "a few thousand copies". It was re-released in June 2000 by Warner Music Australasia however the album was pulled from record stores for uncleared samples and re-released in an altered format by Warner Music Australasia in August 2001. In a 2003 interview with The Age newspaper's Andrew Drever, Mayes recalled that they had no understanding of sample clearances due to their naivety in the music business.

Pnau toured nationally for the Big Day Out in 2001, 2004, 2008 and 2011.

== Track listing ==
Three full length versions of Sambanova have been released to the public, one through the label Peking Duck and two through Warner Music Australasia.

Peking Duck version

- Sambanova (1999, CD format, released by Peking Duck, DUCKCD001)

Sambanova
No.	Title	Length
1.	"Journey Agent"	4:21
2.	"Mellotron"	6:48
3.	"Keep on Truckin'"	4:58
4.	"Hard Biscuit"	5:25
5.	"To Hear Your Love (Jon Hardy's Tinted Mix)"	5:06
6.	"Sambanova"	6:07
7.	"Need Your Lovin' Baby"	6:30
8.	"Direct Drive"	5:37
9.	"Discone"	4:40
10.	"The Red Tapes"	5:21
11.	"Meshes of the Afternoon"	3:47
12.	"Arthur's Pizza"	4:28
13.	"The Last Track"	10:19
Total length:		1:06:27

2000 version

- Sambanova (2000, CD format, had video on it, rereleased by Warner Music Australasia, 8573831942)

Sambanova
No.	Title	Length
1.	"Journey Agent"
2.	"Mellotron"
3.	"Keep on Truckin'"
4.	"Hard Biscuit"
5.	"Sambanova"
6.	"Need Your Lovin' Baby"
7.	"Direct Drive"
8.	"Discone"
9.	"The Red Tapes"
10.	"Meshes of the Afternoon"
11.	"Arthur's Pizza"
12.	"The Last Track"

2001 version

- Sambanova (July 2001, CD format, has 3 bonus tracks, released by Warner Music Australasia, 8573883392)

Sambanova
No.	Title	Length
1.	"Follow Me"	6:09
2.	"Journey Agent"	4:20
3.	"Mellotron"	6:49
4.	"Keep on Truckin'"	4:46
5.	"Hard Biscuit"	5:26
6.	"Ordinary Day"	4:00
7.	"Sambanova"	6:26
8.	"Need Your Lovin' Baby"	6:24
9.	"Direct Drive"	5:36
10.	"The Red Tapes"	4:48
11.	"Searchin'"	6:16
12.	"Meshes of the Afternoon"	3:32
13.	"The Last Track"	6:19
Total length:		70:47

== Personnel ==
Pnau members

- Nick Littlemore – vocals, drums, percussion, synthesiser, keyboards, trombone, melodica, clavi
- Peter Mayes – guitars, vocals, bass guitar, synthesiser, keyboards, melodica, keytar

Additional musicians

- Paul Johannessen – electric piano (Fender Rhodes)
- Gawain McGrath – guitar

== Charts ==
Chart performance for Sambanova
Chart (2000–2001)	Peak position
Australian Albums (ARIA)	39
New Zealand Albums (RMNZ)	48
