= Faul & Wad Ad =

French DJ and record producing duo

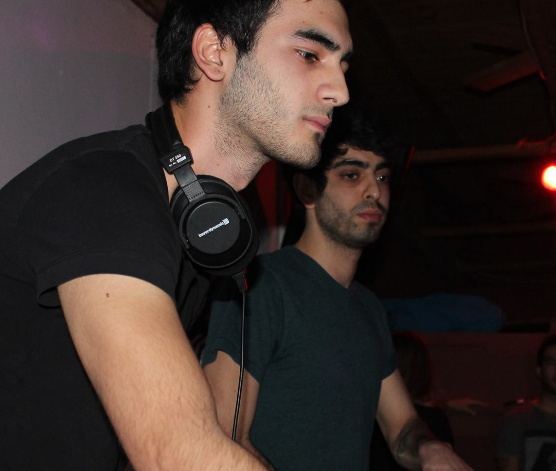
- Faul & Wad Ad (January 2014 in Landshut)

Background information
- Origin: Paris, France
- Genres: Deep house; tropical house
- Years active: 2013–present
- Labels: Four; Spinnin' Records
- Members: Faul (Maxime Ledu); Wad Ad (Camil Meyer)

Faul & Wad Ad are a French DJ and record producer duo from Paris who had a hit in 2013 with the tropical house track "Changes".

== Career ==
=== Early beginnings ===
Faul (stylized as FAUL, meaning lazy in German; the pseudonym of French DJ Maxime Ledu) and Wad Ad (the stage name of French DJ Camil Meyer) met in high school and began producing music during their study time. Maxime Ledu was a student at the Lycee Édouard Branly in Nogent-sur-Marne.

=== 2013–present: Changes ===
In 2013, they heard Pnau, a dance music side project originating from Sydney, sampling a children's choir on the track "Baby". In May 2013, Faul & Wad Ad released their tropical house-style adaptation online, calling it "Changes". The track went on to become an international hit for them, topping the singles chart in Germany. It also charted in Austria, Belgium, Hungary, Netherlands, Spain and Switzerland.

== Discography ==
=== Singles ===
Year	Title	Peak chart positions									Certifications
Year	Title	FRA	AUT	BEL	GER	NL	SPA	SWE	SWI	UK	Certifications
2013	"Changes" (with Pnau)	9	2	3	1	14	2	47	4	3	BEA: Gold; BPI: Platinum; BVMI: Platinum; GLF: Gold; IFPI AUT: Gold; IFPI SWI: Platinum; PROMUSICAE: Gold
2014	"Something New"	—	—	—	—	—	—	—	—	—	
2018	"Wild Love"	—	—	—	—	—	—	—	—	—	
2018	"Tokyo" (with Vertue)	—	—	—	—	—	—	—	—	—	
2019	"Lucky Star" (vs Superfunk featuring Ron Carroll)	—	—	—	—	—	—	—	—	—	
2025	"Everybody"	—	—	—	—	—	—	—	—	—	
"—" denotes a recording that did not chart or was not released in that territory.
