= Pnau (album) =

Studio album by Pnau
- Released: 12 November 2007
- Genres: Electro house; alternative dance; nu-disco
- Length: 48:34
- Labels: etcetc, Pnau Records and Tapes
- Producers: Pnau, Sam Littlemore

Pnau chronology
Again (2003)	Pnau (2007)	Soft Universe (2011)

Alternative cover
- International album cover

Singles from Pnau
- 1. "Wild Strawberries" Released: September 2007; 2. "Shock To My System" Released: November 2007; 3. "Baby" Released: February 2008; 4. "Embrace" Released: June 2008

Pnau is the third studio album by Australian dance music duo Pnau. The album was released on 12 November 2007 on the independent record label etcetc in Australia and on the independent record label Pnau Records and Tapes on LP in the UK in 2009. The album peaked at 31 on the Australian albums chart and was featured at number 89 on the Triple J Hottest 100 Albums of All Time.

At the J Awards of 2007, the album was nominated for Australian Album of the Year.

Shortly after the album's release, Elton John claimed the album to be the greatest record he had heard in ten years. Subsequently, Pnau was signed to John's management, which resulted in their heavily publicised apprenticeship under the music icon.

Additionally, Pnau reunited Nick Littlemore with Luke Steele for the first time in nearly a decade for the album tracks "With You Forever" and "Freedom". According to Littlemore, the track "With You Forever" inspired the artists to collaborate on a side project, which finalised a year later into the electronic pop band Empire of the Sun.

The album also features Ladyhawke (who at the time of this album's release was only previously known for her collaboration with Nick Littlemore as part of the art rock duo Teenager), Feadz, Nick Yannikas of Lost Valentinos, and Michael Di Francesco of Van She.

== Track listing ==
No.	Title	Writer(s)	Length
1.	"With You Forever"	Nick Littlemore, Peter Mayes, Sam Littlemore, Luke Steele	3:34
2.	"Wild Strawberries"	Nick Littlemore, Peter Mayes, Sam Littlemore, Feadz	3:55
3.	"Shock to My System"	Nick Littlemore, Peter Mayes, Sam Littlemore, Nick Yannikas	2:44
4.	"Baby"	Nick Littlemore, Peter Mayes, Sam Littlemore	2:45
5.	"Come Together"	Nick Littlemore, Peter Mayes, Sam Littlemore, Michael Di Francesco	5:01
6.	"We Have Tomorrow"	Nick Littlemore, Peter Mayes, Sam Littlemore	4:28
7.	"Lover"	Nick Littlemore, Peter Mayes, Sam Littlemore	4:47
8.	"No More Violence"	Nick Littlemore, Peter Mayes, Sam Littlemore	4:54
9.	"Embrace"	Nick Littlemore, Peter Mayes, Sam Littlemore, Pip Brown (Ladyhawke)	5:29
10.	"Dancing on the Water"	Nick Littlemore, Peter Mayes, Sam Littlemore	4:07
11.	"Freedom"	Nick Littlemore, Peter Mayes, Sam Littlemore, Luke Steele	4:00
12.	"Die with Us"	Nick Littlemore, Peter Mayes, Sam Littlemore, Michael Di Francesco	2:50

Limited Australian tour edition
No.	Title	Length
13.	"Baby" (Breakbot Remix)	3:56
14.	"Sambanova" (Sam la More Remix)	6:30
15.	"Shock to My System" (Noel Burgess No Tempo Mix)	4:04
16.	"Five Hundred (Pedals)"	5:10
17.	"Shadow in the Shadows: The Opening / The Awakening / Scorched Earth / Power Points"	18:04
18.	"Harmonic Fields"	26:13

== Charts ==
Chart (2007–08)	Peak position
Australian Albums (ARIA)	31

== Release history ==
Region	Date	Format	Label	Catalogue
Australia	12 November 2007	CD	etcetc	ETCETCD002
Australia	12 November 2007	2×CD	etcetc	ETCETCD003
Europe	2009	CD	Pnau Records and Tapes	PNRT 001
