= Sam Littlemore =

Australian record producer, songwriter and recording artist (born 1975)

- Littlemore in 2012

Background information
- Also known as: Sam La More
- Born: Samuel Littlemore; 2 February 1975 (age 51); Sydney, New South Wales, Australia
- Genre: Electronic
- Occupations: Record producer, creative director
- Years active: 2000–present
- Labels: EMI/Virgin Records; Underwater Records; Ministry of Sound
- Formerly of: Pnau
- Website: Sam La More Website

Sam Littlemore (born 2 February 1975), also known as Sam La More, is an Australian record producer, songwriter and recording artist working in Sydney and Los Angeles. Littlemore, a former member of dance music trio Pnau, is best known for the international number one song Cold Heart (Pnau Remix) by Elton John & Dua Lipa (2021) which he and fellow members of Pnau co-wrote and produced. He is also known for his involvement in the production of "What You Waiting For?" (2004) by Gwen Stefani, Pnau songs "Go Bang", "Chameleon" and "Changes" (2013) by Faul & Wad Ad vs. Pnau, "Can't Get Better Than This" (2012) by Parachute Youth, "High" (2013) and "Fire" (2018) by Peking Duk, "Don't Hold Back" (2007) by The Potbelleez and songs with Nellee Hooper, Rick Nowels, Nelly Furtado on Loose (2006), Arthur Baker, Pnau and Tonite Only. He has won multiple ARIA and APRA Awards.

== Biography ==
Samuel Littlemore was born 2 February 1975 in Sydney, Australia, and raised in Wahroonga. Littlemore attended Barker College in Hornsby and the College of Fine Arts at the University of New South Wales, where he received a Bachelor of Fine Arts (Honours, 1st Class) majoring in new media art.

In 1998 Littlemore co-founded Selenium Interactive, a new media design agency. Producing work for Australian and international clients including Coca-Cola, HSBC, TWI / IMG, Indy, Greater Union and Sony PlayStation, the 23-year-old creative director ran design teams in Sydney and London. Within 18 months, they had opened offices in San Francisco, Hong Kong and Shanghai. In 2000, he sold his share to pursue a career as a recording artist.

Littlemore's first foray into the music business came through his younger brother Nick's ARIA Award-winning band Pnau, one of Australia's most respected electronic music duos. From 2001 to present, Littlemore has intermittently acted as co-producer, co-writer and co-performer. He and his brother Nick played together to crowds in excess of 12,000 people (e.g. Big Day Out, Good Vibrations Festival, BBC Radio 1 Miami Winter Music Conference) with Fatboy Slim, Erick Morillo, Derrick Carter and Darren Emerson among others.

Littlemore relocated to London in 2001 to produce with Darren Emerson (Underworld) who released his debut single "Takin' Hold" as Sam La More. Topping the Buzz, Cool Cuts and Hype charts, "Takin' Hold" was also Pete Tong's Essential New Tune and single of the week for DMC's Update magazine. Along with label mate Tim Deluxe's "It Just Won't Do" it helped to propel Underwater Records to winning DJ Mag's Label of the Year 2003.

In 2004, Littlemore started producing pop music, teaming up with London producer Nellee Hooper, they produced Gwen Stefani's debut solo single "What You Waiting For?". In Los Angeles they produced six more songs with her. "What You Waiting For?" went on to be the number 1 single in Australia for a number of weeks.

Littlemore continued working out of London and Los Angeles, songwriting, producing and remixing artists including Pnau, Kaskade, Freestylers, Sneaky Sound System, Robbie Williams, GusGus, TV Rock, The Similou, P. Diddy / Kelis, Empire of the Sun, Cassidy, Ladytron, The Doors, ESG, Mutiny, Random House Project / Robert Owens, Percy Filth and Teenager.

In 2006 Littlemore co-founded the band Tonite Only. Ministry of Sound licensed their two debut songs "Danger (The Bomb)" and "Where the Party's At" internationally. They remixed "All This Love" for the Similou, which spent 11 weeks at number one in the ARIA Club Chart, followed up by 18 weeks at number one for the Tonite Only remix of "Pictures" by Sneaky Sound System, equaling the record set by Madison Avenue's "Don't Call Me Baby". In addition to remixes for Princess Superstar, TV Rock and others, they released the Ministry of Sound compilation "Mashed III". They went on to regularly tour North America and had numerous crossover hits including "We Run the Nite", voted Best Dance Track of the Year 2011 by InTheMix.

2007 saw Littlemore re-establish his solo career as Sam La More, touring Australia, New Zealand, Japan, Europe and North America. He mixed the Pacha compilation for Europe and Australia and co-wrote and produced the third, self-titled Pnau album with his brother Nick and bandmate Peter Mayes. The self-titled Pnau album was highlighted by Elton John as his then-favourite new album featuring singles "Embrace", "With You Forever", "Baby" and "Wild Strawberries". He also co-wrote and co-produced "Don't Hold Back" and "Are You with Me" for the Potbelleez. Both songs spent many weeks in the ARIA top 10, ARIA Club and ARIA Dance charts. Littlemore then moved his focus to finishing singles for other artists including Peking Duk, Parachute Youth, the Potbelleez among others.

In 2015, Littlemore's White Shadows album with Nick Littlemore and Craig Nicholls was released featuring the single "Give Up, Give Out, Give In".

In 2016, Littlemore officially joined Pnau. "Chameleon", their first single as a trio, peaked at number four on the ARIA Singles Chart and reached triple platinum sales in Australia. "Chameleon" was nominated for the Apple Music Song of the Year and won the Best Dance Release at the 2017 ARIA Awards.

In 2017, Pnau released the album Changa to commercial and critical acclaim.

In 2018, Pnau's "Go Bang" won the ARIA Award for Best Dance Release, setting a new record of three ARIA Best Dance Release wins.

In 2021, Elton John asked Pnau to revisit his catalogue and produce a new album, which resulted in the single "Cold Heart (Pnau remix)" with Elton John and Dua Lipa. The single reached number one in the UK and Australia.

Littlemore continues to write, produce and mix records in Sydney.

== Discography ==
=== Productions ===
| Artist Name | Title | Role | Client / Label |
|---|---|---|---|
| Peking Duk (Ft. Circa Waves) | Spend It | Co-Producer / Engineer | Sony Music Entertainment Australia Pty Ltd./ RCA Records |
| Elton John & Dua Lipa | Cold Heart (Pnau remix) | Co-Writer / Producer | Virgin EMI / Mercury Records Limited |
| Pnau | Stranger Love feat. Budjerah | Co-Writer / Producer | etcetc |
| Pirra | Never Apart | Co-Writer / Producer | BLK&WHT RCRDS |
| Pnau | River feat. Ladyhawke | Co-Writer / Producer | etcetc |
| Pnau | Lucky feat. Vlossom | Co-Writer / Producer | etcetc |
| Pnau | All Of Us | Co-Writer / Producer | etcetc |
| Pnau | Solid Gold | Co-Writer / Producer | etcetc |
| Peking Duk (Ft. Al Wright) | UR EYEZ | Co-Producer / Engineer | Sony Music Entertainment Australia Pty Ltd./RCA Records |
| Super Cruel | Me + You | Co-Writer / Producer / Engineer | Warner Music |
| Ajax (Dance Legend) | I'm Hot | Co-Writer / Producer / Engineer | Sweat It Out Music |
| Fluir | Feeling For You | Co-Writer / Producer / Engineer | Fluir Music |
| Peking Duk | Fire | Co-Producer / Engineer | Sony Music Entertainment Australia Pty Ltd./RCA Records |
| Kayex | The Get Up | Co-Writer / Producer / Engineer | Kayex Life |
| Fluir | Change | Co-Writer / Producer / Engineer | Fluir Music |
| Peking Duk | Wasted | Co-Producer / Engineer | Sony Music Entertainment Australia Pty Ltd./RCA Records |
| Timmy Trumpet & Savage | Deja-Vu | Co-Writer / Co-Producer | TMRW Music |
| Pnau | La Grenouille | Co-Writer / Producer | etcetc |
| Pnau | Control Your Body | Co-Writer / Producer | etcetc |
| Pnau | Nothing In The World | Co-Writer / Producer | etcetc |
| Pnau | Young Melody ft. Vera Blue | Co-Writer / Producer | etcetc |
| Pnau | Please Forgive Me | Co-Writer / Producer | etcetc |
| Pnau | Into The Sky | Co-Writer / Producer | etcetc |
| Pnau | In My Head | Co-Writer / Producer | etcetc |
| Pnau | Changa | Co-Writer / Producer | etcetc |
| Pnau | Go Bang | Co-Writer / Producer | etcetc |
| Pnau | Chameleon | Co-Writer / Producer | etcetc |
| Pnau | Save Disco | Co-Writer / Producer | etcetc |
| Peking Duk (Ft. AlunaGeorge) | Fake Magic | Co-Producer / Engineer | Sony Music Entertainment Australia Pty Ltd./RCA Records |
| Jess Kent | Trolls | Co-Producer / Engineer | Capitol USA |
| Jess Kent | Bass So Low | Co-Producer / Engineer | Capitol USA |
| Generik | Late At Night | Co-Writer / Producer / Engineer | OneLove |
| Pnau ft. Petite Meller | Lil' Love (Pnau Mix) | Co-Writer / Producer | Universal Music |
| Paces ft. Jess Kent | 1993 (No Chill) | Additional Production / Engineer | etcetc |
| Asta | Wild Emotions | Additional Production / Engineer | Warner Music |
| Mashd N Kutcher | My Sunshine | Co-Writer / Producer / Engineer | Warner Music |
| Yvng Jalapeño | In Control | Producer / Engineer | Sony Music |
| Jess Kent | Get Down | Additional Production / Engineer | Capitol USA |
| Peking Duk | Say My Name | Engineer | Sony Music Entertainment Australia Pty Ltd./RCA Records |
| Asta (Ft. Allday) | Dynamite | Additional Production / Engineer | Warner Music |
| Jordan Burns | I'll Follow | Co-Writer / Producer / Engineer | Sony Music |
| Jordan Burns | Never to be Found | Co-Writer / Producer / Engineer | Sony Music |
| Jordan Burns | Starlighters | Co-Writer / Producer / Engineer | Sony Music |
| White Shadows | Sun | Co-Writer / Producer | Wicked Nature Music |
| White Shadows | Slip Away | Co-Writer / Producer | Wicked Nature Music |
| White Shadows | Give Up Give Out Give In | Co-Writer / Producer | Wicked Nature Music |
| White Shadows | Everyday | Co-Writer / Producer | Wicked Nature Music |
| White Shadows | Hate | Co-Writer / Producer | Wicked Nature Music |
| White Shadows | Mystery Goddess | Co-Writer / Producer | Wicked Nature Music |
| White Shadows | So It Goes | Co-Writer / Producer | Wicked Nature Music |
| White Shadows | I Belong to You | Co-Writer / Producer | Wicked Nature Music |
| White Shadows | Winter Dreaming | Co-Writer / Producer | Wicked Nature Music |
| Tonite Only | Experience | Writer / Producer / Engineer | Ministry of Sound Australia |
| Peking Duk | High ft. Nicole Millar | Co-Producer / Engineer | Sony Music Entertainment Australia Pty Ltd./RCA Records |
| Tonite Only | Touch ft. Yeah Boy | Writer / Producer / Engineer | Ministry of Sound Australia |
| Parachute Youth | Runaway | Writer / Producer / Engineer | Sweat It Out |
| Pnau vs Faul & Wad Ad | Changes | Co-Writer / Producer | etcetc |
| Tonite Only | F..k Tomorrow | Writer / Producer / Engineer | Ministry of Sound Australia |
| Tonite Only | Go | Writer / Producer / Engineer | Ministry of Sound Australia |
| Parachute Youth | Can't Get Better Than This (EP) | Writer / Producer / Engineer | Sweat It Out |
| Tonite Only | Haters Gonna Hate | Writer / Producer / Engineer | Ministry of Sound Australia |
| Tonite Only | We Run The Nite | Writer / Producer / Engineer | Ministry of Sound Australia |
| Chris Sorbello | So Lonely | Producer / Engineer | Ministry of Sound Australia |
| Beni | My Love Sees You | Writer / Producer / Engineer | Kitsuné |
| The Potbelleez | Are You With Me? | Writer / Producer / Engineer | Vicious Vinyl |
| Pnau | Wild Strawberries | Writer / Producer | etcetc |
| Pnau | Shock To My System | Writer / Producer | etcetc |
| Pnau | Baby | Writer / Producer | etcetc |
| Pnau | Come Together | Writer / Producer | etcetc |
| Pnau | We Have Tomorrow | Writer / Producer | etcetc |
| Pnau | Lover | Writer / Producer | etcetc |
| Pnau | No More Violence | Writer / Producer | etcetc |
| Pnau | Embrace | Writer / Producer | etcetc |
| Pnau | Dancing On The Water | Writer / Producer | etcetc |
| The Potbelleez | Don't Hold Back | Writer / Producer / Engineer | Vicious Vinyl |
| Tonite Only | Where The Party's At | Writer / Producer / Engineer | Hussle Black |
| Tonite Only | DANGER (The Bomb) | Writer / Producer / Engineer | Hussle Black |
| Nelly Furtado | In God's Hands | Programmer | Interscope Records |
| Nelly Furtado | Somebody To Love | Programmer | Interscope Records |
| Nelly Furtado | Runaway | Programmer | Rick Nowels |
| Melinda Jackson | Fall In Love | Writer / Producer / Engineer | iSpy Records |
| Pnau ft. E.S.G. | Donnie Donnie Darko | Writer / Producer / Engineer | Underwater Records |
| Gwen Stefani | What You Waiting For? | Programmer | Interscope Records |
| Gwen Stefani | Just Fine | Programmer | Interscope Records |
| Gwen Stefani | Sparkle | Programmer | Interscope Records |
| Gwen Stefani | The Real Thing | Programmer | Interscope Records |
| Gwen Stefani | Don't Wait Too Long | Programmer | Interscope Records |
| Gwen Stefani | Danger Zone | Programmer | Interscope Records |
| Random House Project | Longing (Darren Emerson Remix) | Additional Production / Engineer | Underwater Records |
| Ladytron | Seventeen (Darren Emerson Remix) | Additional Production / Engineer | Telstar Records |
| P.Diddy Ft. Kelis | Let's Get Ill (Darren Emerson Remix) | Additional Production / Engineer | Bad Boy Records |
| GusGus | David (Darren Emerson Remix) | Additional Production / Engineer | Underwater Records |
| Pnau | Follow Me | Writer / Producer / Engineer | Warner Music |
| Foxtel | Network Theme | Writer / Producer / Engineer | Foxtel Television Network |

=== Remixes ===
| Artist Name | Title | Mix | Format | Label |
|---|---|---|---|---|
| Lizzo | 2 Be Loved | Pnau Remix | Digital & 12” | Atlantic |
| Diana Ross, Tame Impala | Turn Up The Sunshine | Pnau Remix | Digital & 12” | Decca (Universal) |
| Elvis Presley | Don’t Fly Away | Pnau Remix | Digital & 12” | RCA |
| Fatboy Slim | The Rockafeller Skank | Sam La More Remix | Digital & 12" | BMG |
| Baby Raptors | I Am My Only Love | Pnau Remix | Digital | TBC |
| Rixton | Me and My Broken Heart | Pnau Remix | Digital | Interscope |
| Parachute Youth | Runaway | Sam La More Remix | Digital | Sweat It Out |
| D Cup | I'm Corrupt | Sam La More Remix | Digital | Chookie |
| Parachute Youth | Can't Get Better Than This | Sam La More Remix | Digital | Sweat It Out |
| Example | Stay Awake | Tonite Only Remix | Digital | Ministry of Sound |
| Pnau | The Truth | Sam La More Remixes | Digital | etcetc |
| Grafton Primary | The Eagle | Sam La More Remixes | CD, Digital | Sonic Constructions |
| Bag Raiders | Way Back Home | Sam La More Remix | CD, Digital | Modular |
| Miami Horror | Moon Theory | Sam La More Remix | CD, Digital | EMI |
| Empire of the Sun | We Are the People | Sam La More Remix | CD, Digital | EMI |
| Sneaky Sound System | Kansas City | Sam La More Remix | CD, Digital | Whack |
| HooknSling | The Best Thing | Tonite Only Remix | CD, Digital | Hussle / Cr2 |
| Lovers Electric | Honey | Sam La More Remix | CD, Digital | Sony |
| Lovers Electric | Could This Be | Sam La More Remix | CD, Digital | Sony |
| Empire of the Sun | Walking on a Dream | Sam La More Remix | CD, Digital | EMI |
| Mark Brown Ft. Sarah Cracknell | The Journey Continues | Sam La More Remix | CD, Digital | Hussle |
| Pnau | Sambanova | Sam La More Remix | CD, Digital | etcetc |
| Pnau | Baby | Sam La More Remix | CD, Digital | etcetc |
| Pnau | Wild Strawberries | Sam La More Remix | CD, Digital | etcetc |
| Pnau | Embrace | Sam La More Remix | CD, Digital | etcetc |
| The Potbelleez | Don't Hold Back | Pot La More Remix | CD, 12" | Vicious |
| GusGus | Need In Me | Sam La More and Goodwill Remix | CD, 12" | Hussle |
| Kaskade | Be Still | Sam La More Remix | CD, 12" | Hussle |
| Freestylers | Electrified | Sam La More Remixes | CD, 12" | Shock |
| Arthur Baker and Princess Superstar | Return to New York | Sam La More Remix | Promo | - |
| Sadie Ama | Fallin | Sam La More Remix | CD, 12" | Ministry of Sound UK |
| Nick Jay Ft. Peter Millwood | Pour It On | Sam La More Remixes | CD, 12" | Hussle |
| Sneaky Sound System | Pictures | Tonite Only Remix | CD, 12" | Whack / MGM |
| Princess Superstar | Perfect | Tonite Only Remix | CD, 12" | Central Station Records |
| TV Rock | Bimbo | Tonite Only Remixes | CD, 12" | Sony Music |
| And If | Finest Dream | Sam La More Remixes | CD, 12" | Rebirth / NuFrequency |
| HooknSling vs Kid Kenobi | The Bump | Tonite Only Remix | CD, 12" | Hussle Black / Cr2 |
| The Similou | All This Love | Tonite Only Remix | CD, 12" | Hussle Black |
| Pnau | Donnie Donnie Darko | Sam La More Remix | CD, Digital | Propaganda |
| Robbie Williams | Radio | Sam La More Remixes | CD, 12" | Chrysalis UK |
| Frank Kappa | Hear My Call | Sam La More Remix | 12" | Sunflower Records UK |
| Cassidy Ft. Mashonda | Gets No Better | A.D.D. Remix | 12" | J Records NYC |
| Slo Blow | If You Leave | Sam La More Remixes | 12" | Direction Records UK |
| Mint Royale | I Don't Know | Sam La More Remix | 12" | Faith & Hope Records |
| Percy Filth | Show Me Your Monkey | Sam La More Remixes | 2x12" | Southern Fried Records |
| GusGus | Call Of The Wild | Sam La More Remix | CD, 2x12" | Underwater |
| The Doors | Riders On The Storm | Pnau Remix | CD | Warner Music |
| Danielle Spencer | Johnathan White | L'more Remix | CD, 12" | EMI |
| Paul Mac | Sound Of Breaking Up | L'more Remix | CD, 12" | Eleven / EMI |
| Comfortable Addiction | Swingers Club | Pnau Remix | CD | Sony Music |
| BJ White | Middle Of Downtown | Pnau Remix | CD | Festival Mushroom |
| Christine Anu | Jump To Love | Pnau Remix | CD | Festival Mushroom |
| Regurgitator | Are You Being Served? | Pnau Remix | 12" | Warner Music |

=== Releases ===
| Artist Name | Title | Format | Label(s) |
|---|---|---|---|
| Sam La More | "Adrenaline" Ft. Gary Go | Digital | Ministry of Sound (AU) |
| Sam La More | Sessions 8 | Mix CD | Ministry of Sound (AU) |
| Sam La More | "Paradise" | Digital | Ministry of Sound (AU) |
| Sam La More | In The Club 2010 | Mix CD | Ministry of Sound (AU) |
| Sam La More | "I Wish it Could Last" | Digital | Ministry of Sound (AU), Cr2 (UK) |
| Sam La More | Clubbers' Guide to Spring 2009 (with Stafford Brothers) | Mix CD | Ministry of Sound (AU) |
| Sam La More | Clubbers' Guide to 2008 | Mix CD | Ministry of Sound (AU) |
| Sam La More | Pacha | Mix CD | Central Station (AU) / Pacha Ibiza (SP) |
| Sam La More | "Takin' Hold" | CD, 12", MP3 | Virgin / EMI (AU), Underwater Records, Submental Records, Motivo Productions (Italy), Subliminal, Mixmag, Base Ibiza, EVA Belgium, Trust The DJ, Azuli Records |
