= Pnau =

Australian dance music act

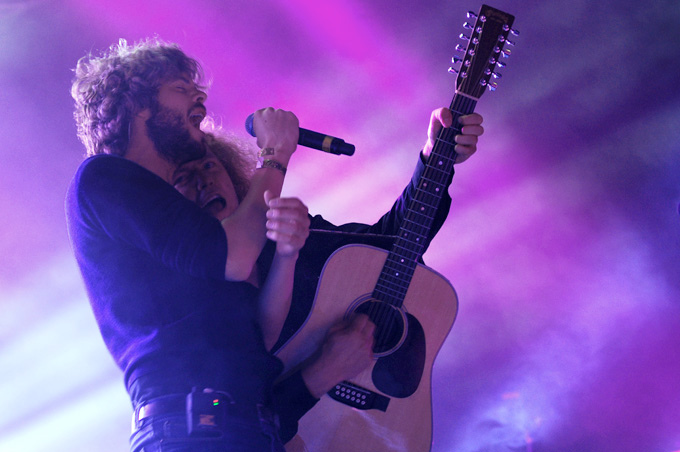
- Pnau – Nick Littlemore (left), Peter Mayes (right) – performing in 2012

Background information
- Origin: Sydney, New South Wales, Australia
- Genres: Electronic; wonky pop
- Years active: 1996–present
- Labels: Peking Duck, Warner Music Australia, etcetc
- Spinoffs: Empire of the Sun
- Members: Nick Littlemore; Peter Mayes
- Past members: Sam Littlemore
- Website: pnau.tv

Pnau (stylised in all caps) (Note: /pəˈnaʊ/ pə-NOW and /pɑːˈnaʊ/ pah-NOW are some accepted pronunciations of Pnau. The name is commonly accented to simulate the sound of a gunshot. Nick Littlemore explained the name was the result of an instance when he was speaking in tongues. After shouting gibberish for half an hour, Littlemore decided Pnau would be an appropriate band name. Another theory on the pronunciation, according to one interview with the pair, is "pah-nyeow". The group has on other occasions explained that the name "rhymes with meow".) are an Australian dance music trio originating from Sydney. The duo consists of the musicians Nick Littlemore (vocals, production) and Peter Mayes (guitar, production), with Littlemore's brother Sam as a third member from 2016 to 2024. Pnau first gained recognition through their 1999 debut album Sambanova, which later won an ARIA Music Awards for Best Dance Release. Their third album, Pnau (2007), brought them further critical acclaim and success. Pnau is also recognised for a heavily publicised apprenticeship under the musician Elton John, who signed the duo after listening to the Pnau album. Several of Pnau's later projects have had John's involvement, such as the 2011 album Soft Universe and an album of Pnau recreations of Elton John's hits called Good Morning to the Night, released in 2012.

Apart from being a member of Pnau, Nick Littlemore also appears as one half of the project Empire of the Sun. In November 2016, the new line-up released "Chameleon", the first single from their album Changa.

== Biography ==
=== 1990s: Beginnings ===
Pnau formed in Sydney, New South Wales by Nick Littlemore and Peter Mayes. The two met at secondary school at the age of 12 and began performing together in the mid-1990s, initially playing acid, house music, and trance music. Littlemore recalled meeting Mayes when he was 10; "He tripped me over. We hated each other for a couple years and then we started sneaking out and going to raves when we were about 13 and we formed a bond over intense music." Littlemore and Mayes created their first album when they were in their mid-teens. "It was called Fractal Geometric Spaces Made of Light," Littlemore remembers, "Which is probably why it was never picked up."

The duo's first commercially available tracks were a pair of nine-minute tracks, "Frisk" and "Anthropophagi", that led off doof@cybersonic.aust.com – an underground acid trance compilation album distributed by cult electronic label Creative Vibes in 1996. Pnau would then feature on another Creative Vibes project, 1998's compilation record Evolutionary Vibes III: The Evolution Will Not Be Televised, with the song "Discone".

=== 1999–2002: Sambanova ===
In July 1999, Pnau released their debut album Sambanova under the independent label Peking Duck. It was recorded in a bedroom studio and they state they only expected it to sell "a few thousand copies". The album was pulled from record stores for using uncleared samples, but re-released in June 2000 and peaked inside the ARIA top 40. In October 2000, at the ARIA Music Awards of 2000, the album won Best Dance Release. In a 2003 interview with The Age, Mayes said that they had no understanding of sample clearances due to their naïveté in the music business. Mayes claimed that the album's recall did seriously affect their commercial sales. Littlemore later contested, "They screwed us over for $300,000. Warners didn't; another third party did. But that happens. We're still here, we're still doing it."

Pnau went on to make many live appearances at music festivals like Big Day Out in 2001 and Homebake in 2002. During this time, they garnered a reputation for their lively performances.

=== 2003–2007: Again ===
In October 2003, Pnau released their second studio album, Again. The album was not a commercial success and Littlemore was later quoted as Again being "the worst record I've ever done". Littlemore has since retracted the statement. When asked if he still considered Again to be his worst record, Littlemore responded, "Well next to Soft Universe. They're sort of on par." Littlemore further explained that his opinions are influenced by the albums' commercial success, which is an easy headspace for him to get into since "everyone loves Empire of the Sun, it's sold 1.1 million records." Despite the seemingly unfavourable album response, several tracks received considerable acclaim - the most noteworthy being "We Love the Fresh Kills" which was a significantly popular single for the duo at the time. However, because of Again's lackluster success the pair parted ways for some time to work with other artists such as Robbie Williams, Van She, and Lost Valentinos.

=== 2007–2009: Pnau and Empire of the Sun ===
In 2007, the duo reunited and wrote over two-hundred songs together and started to lay down an entire album with Littlemore's brother Sam as producer. They sent a work-in-progress track to long-time friend and collaborator Luke Steele, who sent back the track with his own vocals. After receiving the track, the Littlemore brothers and Mayes agreed to scrap almost everything they had laid down to focus on a more vocally centred album. The track became known as "With You Forever" and the finalised album was released under the self-titled name Pnau. The album not only featured vocal work from Steele and Littlemore, but also had many guest appearances such as Ladyhawke, Feadz, Nik Yannika from Lost Valentinos and Michael DeFrancesco from Van She. The album was released to high critical acclaim and gained unexpected favorable attention from John, declaring it to be the greatest record he'd heard in ten years.

Inspired by their track "With You Forever", Pnau began work on a collaboration with Steele, which would call themselves Empire of the Sun. Originally titled Steelemore, Empire of the Sun released its debut single in August 2008 titled "Walking on a Dream" and its debut album in October 2008 with Walking on a Dream. Littlemore and Steele took the roles of bandmates, while Mayes assumed the role of producer. Some critics were quick to note that the band sounded more like a work of Pnau than Steele's band The Sleepy Jackson. Empire of the Sun has achieved international success having been certified 2× Platinum in Australia and gold in the United Kingdom, as well as winning eleven ARIA awards. PNAU makes it clear on their Myspace numerous times that not only is Empire of the Sun a side project of theirs, but that they are also the producers. Regarding Empire of the Sun, in early 2009 news began appearing that Littlemore had disappeared. The reality had been that Nick Littlemore had left Empire of the Sun to begin work on the fourth Pnau album along with John.

=== 2010–2011: Soft Universe ===
In 2010, Pnau's track "Baby" (remixed by Breakbot) appeared in the release of Sony Computer Entertainment's "Gran Turismo 5", in the Background Music (BGM) playlist.

In February 2011, Pnau released "The Truth", the lead single from their forthcoming fourth studio album, Soft Universe. Soft Universe was released in June 2011 and peaked at number 13 on the ARIA Charts. Littlemore has described it as a very "emotional" album, inspired by the breakup with his long-time girlfriend. With input from John, the album features Littlemore singing all the vocals on the album along with tracks co-written with fellow Aussie artist Martin Craft and producer Mark Saunders. The album was positively received, although mainly critics expressed discontent with the lack of the "endearing weirdness of previous Pnau and Empire releases." The Soft Universe album received the Australian Independent Record (AIR) Award for Best Independent Dance/Electronica Album.

=== 2012–2015: Good Morning to the Night ===
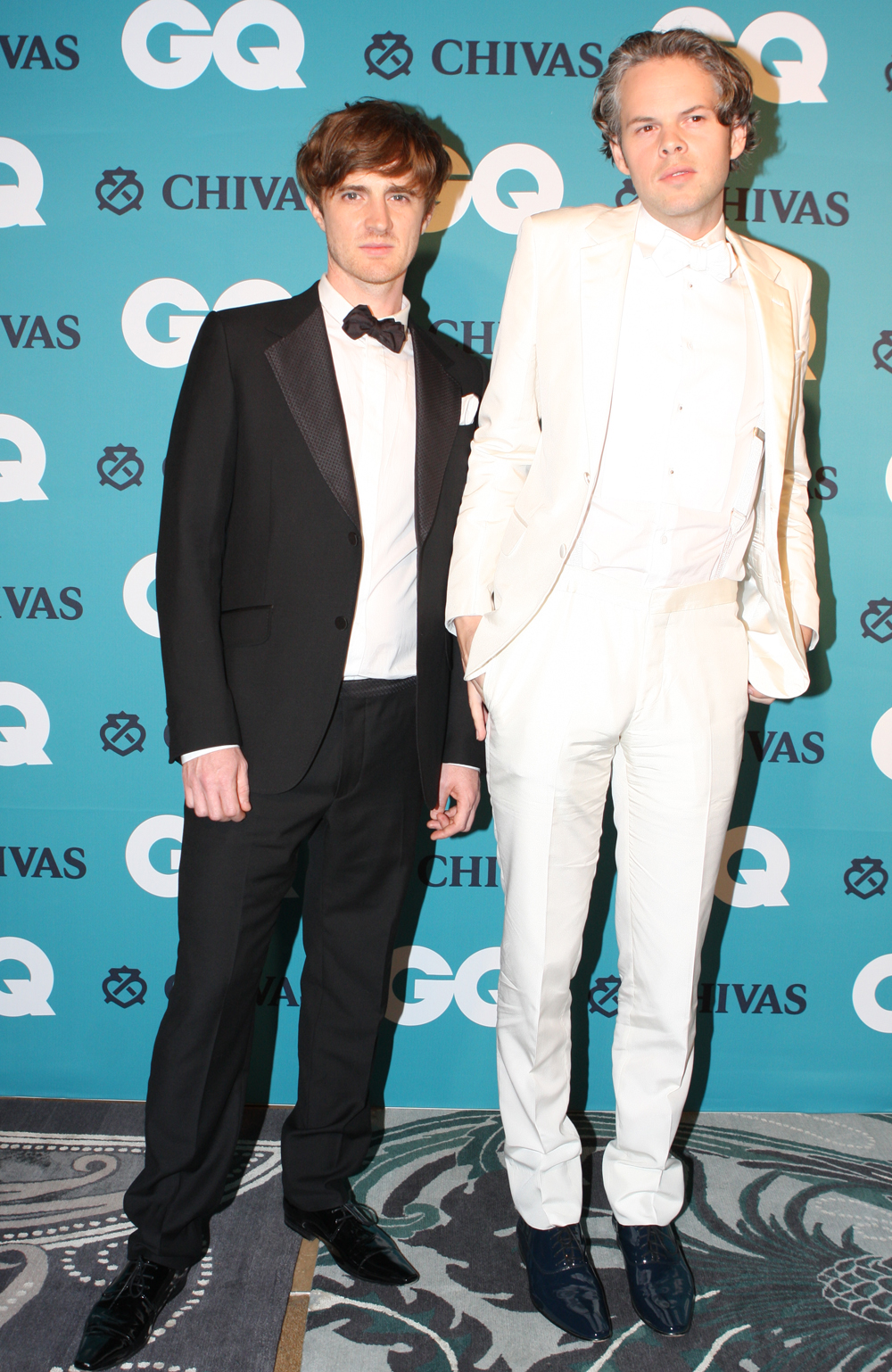
PNAU in 2012

On 10 March 2012, the first remix track from the anticipated, upcoming John rework album commissioned for Pnau was leaked, initially airing on Pete Tong's BBC Radio 1 broadcast. In July 2012 two singles were released from the album, "Good Morning to the Night" and "Sad", while the album Good Morning to the Night was released and reaching number 1 on the UK Albums Chart.

In November 2013 French duo Faul & Wad Ad released "Changes" credited to, vs Pnau. The song samples Pnau's "Baby" and reached the top ten in numerous countries across Europe.

=== 2016–2018: Changa ===
In November 2016, Pnau released "Chameleon" as the lead single from the upcoming fifth studio album. The song peaked at number 4 on the ARIA Charts and was certified 4× platinum. At the ARIA Music Awards of 2017, the song won the groups their second ARIA Award for Best Dance Release. Changa was released in November 2017 and peaked at number 11 on the ARIA Charts. The album spawned two more singles "Go Bang" and "Changa". At the ARIA Music Awards of 2018, "Go Bang" won the group's third ARIA Award for Best Dance Release.

=== 2019-2024: Hyperbolic ===
The band released the single "Solid Gold" on 2 May 2019. The song continues Pnau's collaboration with Kira Divine on vocals, and also features additional vocals by Marques Toliver. The band hosted a live chat on their Facebook page to support the release. In August 2019, the band released the single "All of Us". In December 2020, the band worked with Ladyhawke again and released the single "River".

In August 2021, Pnau produced a remix medley of several John songs along with Dua Lipa, titled "Cold Heart (Pnau remix)". The single charted in many countries worldwide, becoming their 3rd top 10 in Australia and their second in the UK, as well as their first song to chart in the US. Over the next few years, Pnau released singles with Budjerah, Troye Sivan, Khalid, Bebe Rexha and Ozuna.

In October 2023, Pnau released "AEIOU" with Empire of the Sun and announced their sixth studio album, Hyperbolic, which was released in March 2024.

=== 2025-present: Ahhcade ===
In May 2026, the duo announced their seventh album Ahhcade would be released on 31 July 2026. It peaked at number 33 on the ARIA Charts.

== Discography ==
- Sambanova (1999)
- Again (2003)
- Pnau (2007)
- Soft Universe (2011)
- Changa (2017)
- Hyperbolic (2024)
- Ahhcade (2026)

== Awards and nominations ==
=== AIR Awards ===
The Australian Independent Record Awards (commonly known informally as AIR Awards) is an annual awards night to recognise, promote and celebrate the success of Australia's Independent Music sector.

Year	Nominee / work	Award	Result	Ref.
2011	Soft Universe	Best Independent Dance/Electronic Album	Won	
2011	"Solid Ground"	Best Independent Dance/Electronic Single	Nominated	
2018	Changa	Best Independent Dance/Electronic Album	Won	
2018	"Go Bang"	Best Independent Dance/Electronic Single	Won	
2020	"Solid Gold"	Best Independent Dance/Electronic Single	Nominated	
2021	"River" (featuring Ladyhawke)	Best Independent Dance, Electronica or Club Single	Nominated	
2022	"Stranger Love" (with Budjerah)	Best Independent Dance, Electronica or Club Single	Nominated	
2023	"You Know What I Need" (with Troye Sivan)	Best Independent Dance, Electronica or Club Single	Nominated	
2024	Pnau	Independent Producer of the Year	Nominated	
2025	Hyperbolic	Best Independent Dance or Electronica Album or EP	Nominated	

=== ARIA Awards ===
The ARIA Music Awards is an annual awards ceremony held by the Australian Recording Industry Association. They commenced in 1987. Pnau have won 3 awards from 17 nominations.

Year	Nominee / work	Award	Result
2000	Sambanova	Best Dance Release	Won
2008	Pnau	Best Dance Release	Nominated
2008	"Baby" (James Littlemore)	Best Video	Nominated
2011	Soft Universe	Best Dance Release	Nominated
2017	"Chameleon"	Best Dance Release	Won
2017	"Chameleon"	Song of the Year	Nominated
2018	Changa	Album of the Year	Nominated
2018	"Go Bang"	Best Group	Nominated
2018	"Go Bang"	Best Dance Release	Won
2018	"Go Bang"	Best Independent Release	Nominated
2018	"Go Bang"	Song of the Year	Nominated
2018	Toby Pike and Nick Littlemore - Pnau "Go Bang"	Best Video	Nominated
2018	Pnau Changa Australian Tour	Best Australian Live Act	Nominated
2019	"Solid Gold"	Best Dance Release	Nominated
2019	Clemens Habicht - "Solid Gold"	Best Video	Nominated
2020	Imogen Grist, Nick Littlemore for "Lucky" (featuring Vlossom)	Best Video	Nominated
2020	All of Us Australian Tour	Best Australian Live Act	Nominated
2023	"You Know What I Need" (with Troy Sivan)	Best Dance/Electronic Release	Nominated

=== APRA Awards ===
The APRA Awards are held in Australia and New Zealand by the Australasian Performing Right Association to recognise songwriting skills, sales and airplay performance by its members annually.

Year	Nominee / work	Award	Result
2018	"Chameleon"	Dance Work of the Year	Nominated
2018	"Chameleon"	Most Played Australian Work	Nominated
2019	"Go Bang"	Dance Work of the Year	Nominated
2019	"Go Bang"	Most Played Australian Work	Nominated
2020	"Solid Gold"	Most Performed Dance Work of the Year	Nominated
2021	"All of Us" (featuring Ollie Gabriel)	Most Performed Dance Work of the Year	Nominated
2022	"River" (featuring Ladyhawke)	Most Performed Dance Work of the Year	Nominated
2024	"You Know What I Need" (featuring Troye Sivan)	Most Performed Dance/Electronic Work	Nominated
2025	"AEIOU" (featuring Empire of the Sun)	Most Performed Dance/Electronic Work	Nominated

=== Berlin Music Video Awards ===
The Berlin Music Video Awards is a festival that promotes the art of music videos.

Year	Nominee/Work	Award	Result
2023	You Know What I Need	Best Experimental	Nominated

=== J Award ===
The J Awards are an annual series of Australian music awards that were established by the Australian Broadcasting Corporation's youth-focused radio station Triple J. They commenced in 2005.

Year	Nominee / work	Award	Result
2007	Pnau	Australian Album of the Year	Nominated

=== MTV Europe Music Awards ===
The MTV Europe Music Awards is an award presented by Viacom International Media Networks to honour artists and music in pop culture.

Year	Nominee / work	Award	Result
2017	themselves	Best Australian Act	Nominated

=== National Live Music Awards ===
The National Live Music Awards (NLMAs) commenced in 2016 to recognise contributions to the live music industry in Australia.

Year	Nominee / work	Award	Result
2019	Pnau	Live Electronic Act (or DJ) of the Year	Nominated

=== Rolling Stone Australia Awards ===
The Rolling Stone Australia Awards are awarded annually in January or February by the Australian edition of Rolling Stone magazine for outstanding contributions to popular culture in the previous year.

Year	Nominee / work	Award	Result	Ref.
2022	Pnau	Rolling Stone Global Award	Nominated	
