= Etcetc =

Australia record label

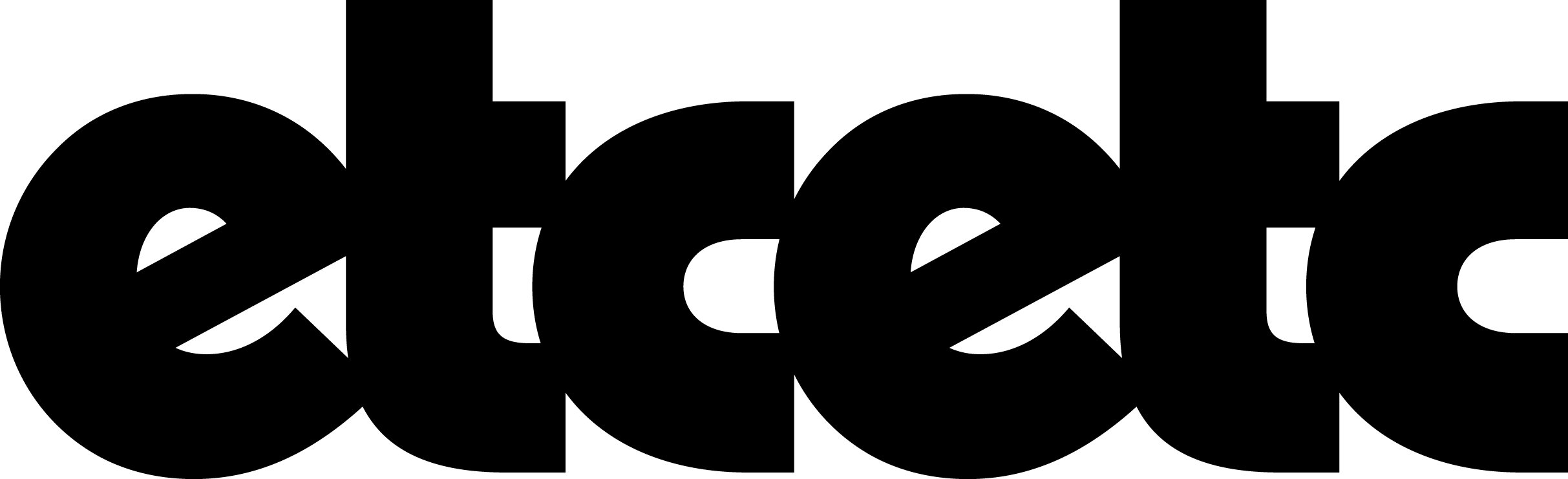
- Founded: August 2008
- Founder: Andrew Jackson; Tim McGee; Richard Mergler
- Distributor: Independent
- Country of origin: Australia
- Location: Sydney
- Official website: www.etcetc.tv

Etcetc Music is an independent record label based in Sydney, Australia. It is the label of alternative and electronic bands and artists Pnau, George Maple, Kilter, Paces, San Mei, Luke Million, CLYPSO, Luboku, and the Australian releases of Jax Jones, Fisher, Duke Dumont and Fever Ray.

Since June 2013 etcetc has been headed up by former Ministry of Sound A&R and Compilations Manager Aden Mullens, who in October 2018 moved into a General Manager position. With a strong foundation in A&R and marketing, Mullens is actively involved in the signing and development of artists and their individual recording careers.

During Mullens' tenure, etcetc have received 10 ARIA Music Awards nominations including Album of the Year, Song of the Year, Best Independent Release, and Best Video. Etcetc won Best Dance Release in successive years with Pnau for 'Chameleon' in 2017 and 'Go Bang' in 2018.

In February 2018, etcetc was awarded Indie Label of the Year at The Music Network's 'Tinnie' Awards. TMN 'Tinnies' celebrate the crushing success of executives and artists inside Australia's music business. Mullens was also nomination for Label A&R of the Year, the only independent record label A&R nominated in the category.

etcetc has been distributed by The Orchard since 2019.

== History ==
Founded as a company in August 2008 by Andrew Jackson, Tim McGee and Richard Mergler, etcetc was originally launched in March 2007 as a trading name within the Ministry of Sound Australia business to focus on artist album projects, before becoming fully independent.

In 2004 when Jackson was A&R / Recordings Manager for Ministry of Sound Australia, he signed Mylo's Destroy Rock & Roll to the label. Released through EMI Australia, who Ministry were distributed by at the time, the album went on to achieve Gold status in Australia (currently awaiting ARIA certification). Later licenses included The Knife's Deep Cuts and follow-up Silent Shout (named the #1 Album of the Year in 2006 by alternative media site Pitchfork Media), WhoMadeWho's self-titled debut, and Jenny Wilson's Love & Youth.

In March 2007, Jackson and McGee decided to create a dedicated brand for album projects, named etcetc. The first release under the new brand was Digitalism's Idealism, in partnership with Virgin Music to whom the band were signed worldwide.

In December 2007, Ministry of Sound Australia and etcetc changed distribution partners from EMI Australia to Universal Music Australia.

In February 2008, etcetc signed Melbourne band Mission Control and released their debut EP soon after. The EP also converted Australian youth broadcast network Triple J as fans; as a result Mission Control earned a feature as a Next Crop artist for 2009. The accompanying film clip (for the title track) was directed by the production house Krozm. Mission Control are currently working on recording demos for their debut album for release in 2010.

In October 2008, etcetc signed Sydney band Lost Valentinos to the label and started promotion on their debut album Cities of Gold, produced over the previous two years in collaboration with producer Ewan Pearson. The first single was The Bismarck in December, released on tastemaker label Bang Gang 12 Inches, and then Serio in February 2009, featuring a video directed by video director Dave Ma. The single Midnights followed as a one-off release on Leo Silverman's boutique label Dummy, featuring remixes from Fan Death and Emperor Machine, and supported by select European performances received acclaim from NME, The Guardian, and plays from BBC Radio One's Zane Lowe.

== Artists ==
- Airwolf Paradise
- Aunty Donna
- Bearcubs [ANZ only]
- BRUX
- Chez Moon
- CLYPSO
- Digitalism [ANZ only]
- Donatachi
- DOOLIE
- Dual Manner
- George Maple
- Fever Ray [ANZ only]
- Favored Nations
- Fisher [ANZ only]
- Flamingo
- George Michelle
- Godwolf
- Jax Jones [ANZ only]
- JNTHN STEIN
- Kilter
- Klue
- Luboku
- Luke Million
- Lost Valentinos
- Paces
- Palais
- PNAU
- POOLCLVB
- San Mei
- Set Mo
- Sumner
- Surahn
