= Ormond Scenic Loop and Trail =

Scenic roads in Florida, United States

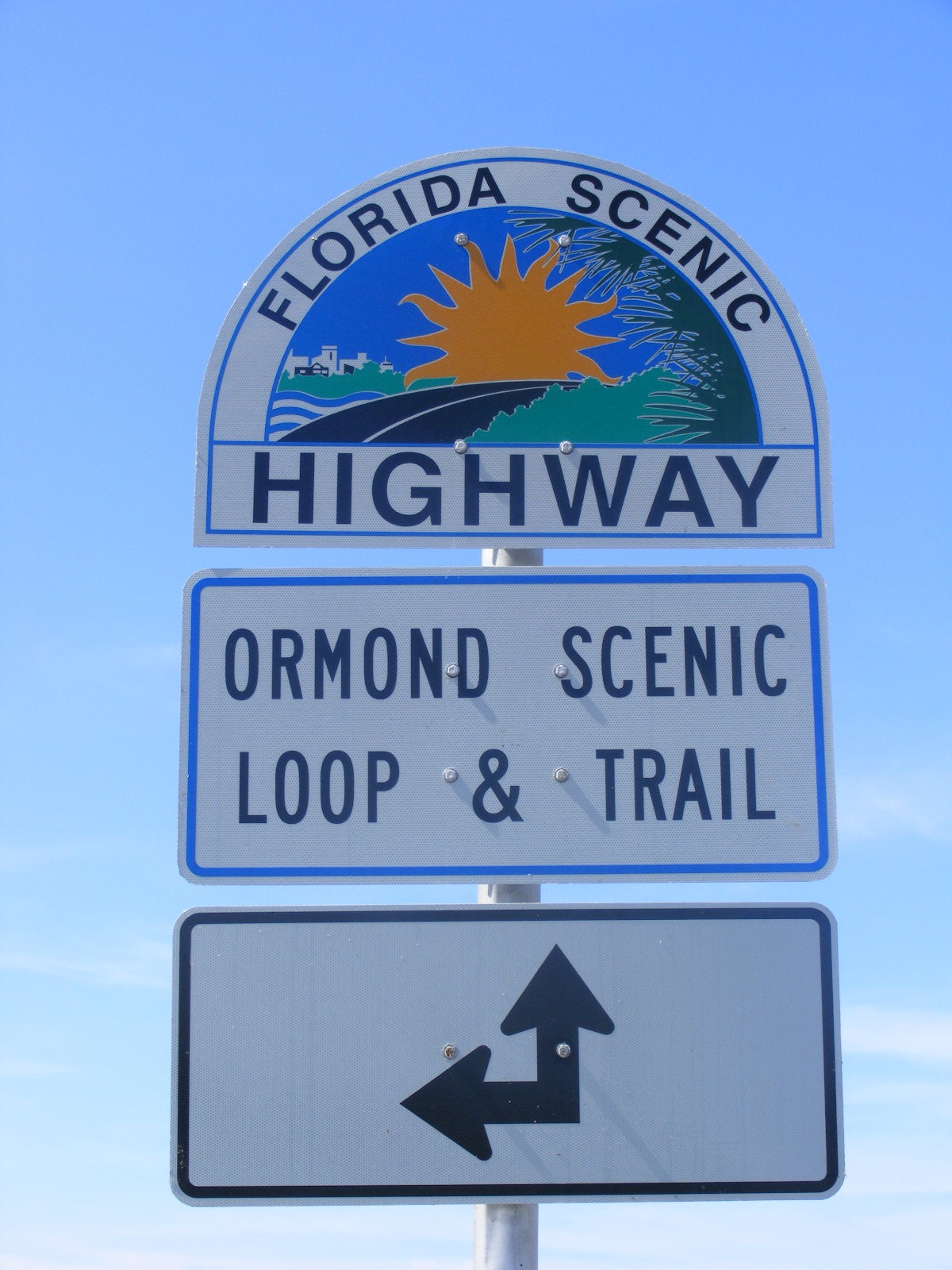
Ormond Scenic Loop and Trail

The Ormond Scenic Loop and Trail is a series of scenic state and county highways in Volusia County, Florida. CR 2002 (Highbridge Road and Walter Boardman Road) is the northern leg of the trail. CR 4011(Old Dixie Highway and North Beach Street) is the western leg, with a spur onto Pine Tree Drive. SR 40(East Granada Boulevard) is the southern leg of the trail. CR 2803(John Anderson Drive) is the central leg of the trail, and SR A1A is the eastern leg of the trail. Florida Scenic Highway, designated this route on July 9, 2007.

== County Road 2002 ==
County Road 2002
- Location: Korona-Ormond-By-The-Sea
- Length: 6.8 mi (10.9 km)

County Road 2002 (CR 2002) is a bi-county highway at the extreme northeastern part of Volusia County, Florida. It two lanes wide along its length. The county road is 4.2-mile-long (6.8 km), but in Flagler County, the road is 2.5-mile-long (4.0 km), giving a total of 6.7 miles (10.8 km). Normally, CR 2002 is a scenic route through trees, and some views of Bulow Creek.

=== Flagler County ===
Beginning at US 1 in Korona, CR 2002 immediately intersects CR 325, and runs southeast. The road is another section of Old Dixie Highway(which makes it a former section of US 1), and in some instances, Marco Polo Boulevard. The next intersection is CR 335, but after turning from southeast to east has very few intersections, all of which are of minor streets such as Bayberry Village Road. Only after the road crosses Plantation Bay Drive and some power lines does it come near some cluster developments as it approaches I-95 at the Flagler–Volusia county line.

=== Volusia County ===
At the Flagler–Volusia county line, CR 2002 not only has an interchange with I-95, but serves as the beginning of the concurrency with CR 4011. Shortly after this it serves as the southern terminus of CR 2001, and as it approaches Bulow Creek State Park, the concurrency with CR 4011 ends as it takes Old Dixie Highway south towards Ormond Beach, while CR 2002 shifts onto Walter Boardman Lane. It is here that the west and north legs of the Ormond Scenic Loop and Trail meet, and the trail moves from CR 4011 to CR 2002. Now inside Bulow Creek State Park, CR 2002 continues east as it approaches another bridge before meeting the intersection of CR 201, which drivers and hikers will enter unless they make a right turn. Then they can continue onto Walter Boardman Lane as it moves south along Bulow Creek and then turns east only to become Highbridge Avenue where it runs between North Peninsula State Park, and Tomoka Marsh Aquatic Preserve. The road approaches a bascule bridge over the Intracoastal Waterway known as the Knox Memorial Bridge, and afterwards intersects CR 2803 (John Anderson Drive), which is another leg of the trail. On this side of the bridge, North Peninsula State Park can be found on both sides of the road. CR 2002 ends at SR A1A in Ormond-By-The-Sea, but the trail turns in both directions along SR A1A; either south towards SR 40 in Ormond Beach, or north towards the Volusia–Flagler county line in Flagler Beach.

=== Major intersections ===
| County | Location | mi | km | Destinations | Notes |
|---|---|---|---|---|---|
| Flagler | Korona | 0.0 | 0.0 | US 1 (South State Street) / CR 325 | |
| Flagler | | 0.5 | 0.80 | CR 335 north | |
| Volusia | | 2.6 | 4.2 | I-95 / CR 4011 – Miami, Jacksonville | I-95 exit 278; western terminus of CR 4011 overlap |
| Volusia | | 3.1 | 5.0 | CR 2001 north (Old Kings Road South) | To Bulow Plantation Ruins Historic State Park |
| Volusia | Bulow Creek State Park | 3.6 | 5.8 | CR 4011 south (Old Dixie Highway) | East end of CR 4011 overlap; Ormond Scenic Loop & Trail begins; CR 2002 moves to Walter Boardman Lane |
| Volusia | | 4.6 | 7.4 | Bridge over the Halifax River | |
| Volusia | South Bulow | 4.8 | 7.7 | CR 201 north (Walter Boardman Lane) | CR 2002 and OSLT move to High Bridge Road |
| Volusia | | 6.4 | 10.3 | Knox Memorial Bridge over Intracoastal Waterway | |
| Volusia | Ormond-By-The-Sea | 6.6 | 10.6 | CR 2803 south (John Anderson Drive) | Central leg of the OSLT |
| Volusia | Ormond-By-The-Sea | 6.8 | 10.9 | SR A1A | Eastern terminus of CR 2002; Eastern leg of the OSLT runs in both directions |
1.000 mi = 1.609 km; 1.000 km = 0.621 mi: Concurrency terminus; Route transition

== County Road 4011 ==
County Road 4011
- Location: Daytona Beach – Korona
- Length: 15.41 mi (24.80 km)

County Road 4011 is a county highway in northern Volusia County, Florida. It is widely known as "the Scenic Route" because of the proximity to the Halifax River. CR 4011 is unsigned, and used to be a part of US 1. The intersection of SR 40 in Ormond Beach is where the south leg of the Ormond Scenic Loop and Trail ends and the west leg of the trail begins. CR 4011 enters Tomoka State Park just before it crosses over a bridge at the mouth of the Tomoka River. Along the western edge of Bulow Creek State Park, CR 4011 forms a concurrency with CR 2002 then turns west, while the Ormond Trail turns east onto CR 2002. The northern terminus is at I-95, ending the concurrency of CR 2002/CR 4011. The southern terminus is SR 430 in Daytona Beach. From I-95 to Ormond Beach, it is known as Old Dixie Highway. In Holly Hill, it is known as Riverside Drive.

=== Major intersections ===
The entire route is in Volusia County.

| Location | mi | km | Destinations | Notes |
|---|---|---|---|---|
| Daytona Beach | 0.000 | 0.000 | SR 430 (Oakridge Boulevard) – ERAU, Seabreeze Bridge | |
| Holly Hill | 1.5 | 2.4 | CR 4019 (LPGA Boulevard) – LPGA International | |
| Ormond Beach | 4.3 | 6.9 | SR 40 (West Granada Boulevard) – Barberville, Granada Bridge | Ormond Scenic Loop & Trail joins from westbound SR 40 |
| | 8.7 | 14.0 | Bridge over the Tomoka River | |
| Tomoka State Park | 9.2 | 14.8 | CR 2820 west (Pine Tree Drive) – Addison Blockhouse Historic State Park | OSLT spur |
| Bulow Creek State Park | 14.4 | 23.2 | CR 2002 east (Walter Boardman Lane) | South end of CR 2002 overlap; OSLT turns east along CR 2002 |
| | 14.9 | 24.0 | CR 2001 north (Old Kings Highway) | |
| | 15.41 | 24.80 | I-95 / CR 2002 west – Jacksonville, Miami, Korona | Northern terminus of CR 4011 and overlap with CR 2002; I-95; Exit 278; CR 2002 continues west to Korona |
1.000 mi = 1.609 km; 1.000 km = 0.621 mi: Concurrency terminus; Route transition

== County Road 2820 ==
County Road 2820
- Location: Volusia County
- Length: 2.1 mi (3.4 km)

County Road 2820 is Pine Tree Drive. It spans from US 1 southeast of Exit 273 on I-95 in National Gardens to CR 4011 along the north end of Tomoka State Park. However, only the portion within the Ormond Beach city limits is part of the scenic trail.

=== Major intersections ===
The entire route is in Ormond Beach, Volusia County.

| mi | km | Destinations | Notes |
|---|---|---|---|
| 0.0 | 0.0 | US 1 | Western terminus of CR 2820 |
| 2.1 | 3.4 | CR 4011 (Beach Street) | Eastern terminus of CR 2820 |
1.000 mi = 1.609 km; 1.000 km = 0.621 mi

== State Road 40 ==
State Road 40
- Location: Ormond Beach, Florida

The southern leg of the trail is SR 40 to the east end. This segment begins at the intersection of CR 4011 and SR 40 at Ormond Beach City Hall on the southwest corner of Granada Boulevard and Beach Street. From there, SR 40 crosses the Granada Bridge over the Halifax River, and immediately intersects John Anderson Drive (CR 2803), where one leg of the scenic route heads north and West Granada Boulevard becomes East Granda Boulevard, before finally terminating at SR A1A. The other leg of the Ormond Beach Scenic Loop heads north on SR A1A. Despite the fact that SR 40 terminates at SR A1A, East Granada Boulevard continues as a beach access road.

== County Road 2803 ==
County Road 2803
- Location: Ormond Beach-Ormond-By-The-Sea
- Length: 8.9 mi (14.3 km)

County Road 2803 is known as John Anderson Drive. However, it was originally part of the much longer John Anderson Highway, which connected Miami to Jacksonville, Florida, until it was absorbed into the longer Dixie Highway around 1915.

Portions of John Anderson Highway still exist in St. Johns County. A section of the road in Flagler and Volusia counties is still known as John Anderson Highway; a part a bit to the south, also in Volusia County, is now John Anderson Drive. The segment between SR 40 and CR 2002 is today one leg of the loop.

=== Major intersections ===
The entire route is in Volusia County.

| Location | mi | km | Destinations | Notes |
|---|---|---|---|---|
| Ormond Beach | 0.0 | 0.0 | SR 40 (Granada Boulevard) | Southern terminus of CR 2803 |
| Ormond-by-the-Sea | 8.9 | 14.3 | CR 2002 (High Bridge Road) | Northern terminus of CR 2803 |
1.000 mi = 1.609 km; 1.000 km = 0.621 mi

== State Road A1A ==
State Road A1A
- Location: Ormond Beach-Ormond-By-The-Sea

As SR 40 becomes a beach access road, the Ormond Scenic Trail turns north along SR A1A, and follows this route until it reaches the Flagler county line. The route terminates here, but SR A1A continues north along the east coast of Florida.
