= Knox =

Knox may refer to:

== Places ==
=== United States ===
- Fort Knox, a United States Army post in Kentucky
  - United States Bullion Depository, a high security storage facility commonly called Fort Knox
- Fort Knox (Maine), a fort located on the Penobscot River in Prospect, Maine
- Knox Memorial Bridge, a bridge that crosses the Intracoastal Waterway north of Ormond Beach, Florida
- Knox, Indiana
- Knox, Maine
- Knox, New York
- Knox, North Dakota
- Knox, Knox County, Ohio
- Knox, Vinton County, Ohio
- Knox, Pennsylvania
- Knox, Wisconsin, a town
  - Knox Mills, Wisconsin, a ghost town
- Knox City, Missouri
- Knox City, Texas
- Knox County (disambiguation)
- Knox Township (disambiguation)

=== Other places ===
- City of Knox, Victoria, Australia
- Knox Atoll, Marshall Islands
- Knox Coast, the coast of Antarctica lying between Cape Hordern and the Hatch Islands
- Westfield Knox, a shopping centre in Wantirna South, a suburb of Melbourne, Victoria, Australia

== Ships ==
- USS Knox (FF-1052), the prototype and lead ship of the Knox class of destroyer escorts
  - Knox-class frigate, a class of United States Navy ships
- USS Frank Knox (DD-742), a Gearing-class destroyer in the United States Navy during World War II

== Organisations ==
- Knox Automobile Company, an American Brass Era car manufacturer
- Knox Basketball Inc, a basketball association in Melbourne, Australia
- Knox Associates, d.b.a. The Knox Company, an American company that makes security devices such as the Knox Box

=== Schools ===
- Knox Academy, a secondary school in Haddington, Scotland
- Knox College (Illinois), a liberal arts college in Galesburg, Illinois
- Knox College, Otago, one of the constituent colleges of the University of Otago in New Zealand
- Knox College, Toronto, a theological college in Toronto, Canada
- Knox Grammar School in New South Wales, Australia
- The Knox School (Australia), in Wantirna South, a suburb of Melbourne, Victoria, Australia

=== Churches ===
- Knox Presbyterian Church (Oakville)
- Knox Presbyterian Church (Ottawa)
- Knox Presbyterian Church (Toronto)
- Knox United Church (Calgary)
- Knox United Church (Scarborough), a Presbyterian Church in Scarborough, Ontario

== People ==
- Knox (given name)
- Knox (surname), including list of persons and fictional characters with the surname
- Knox (pop rock musician), American pop singer and songwriter
- Knox (punk musician) (born 1945), guitarist, singer and songwriter of original UK punk rock band The Vibrators
- Knox Cameron (born 1983), Jamaican-American soccer striker

=== Fictional characters ===
- Knox, one of the characters in the Dr. Seuss book Fox in Socks (1965)
- Knox Overstreet, a character in the film Dead Poets Society (1989)

== Other uses ==
- Knox Bible (Knox's Translation of the Vulgate), a 1950 twentieth century translation of the Bible by Msgr. Ronald Knox
- Knox Box, a small, wall-mounted safe that holds building keys for firefighters to retrieve in emergencies
- Knox gelatin, a brand of gelatin now marketed by Kraft Foods
- Henry Knox Trail, marking the Historic path of Colonel Henry Knox's transport of cannon during the Revolutionary war.
- Samsung Knox, an enterprise mobile security solution

== See also ==
- KNOX (disambiguation)
- Blaw-Knox tower, a guyed tower for medium wave transmission
- John Knox House, an historic house in Edinburgh, Scotland
- Albright–Knox Art Gallery, a major showplace for modern art and contemporary art in the western New York Region
- Knox Mine disaster, a mining accident that took place near the village of Port Griffith, in Jenkins Township, Pennsylvania
- Frank Knox Memorial Fellowship, fellowships affiliated with Harvard University, given in honor of Frank Knox
- Knocks (disambiguation)
- Nox (disambiguation)
