= Bülow (disambiguation) =

Bülow is a surname. It may also refer to:

- Bülow, Germany, a municipality in the district of Parchim, Mecklenburg-Vorpommern
- Arrigo Boldrini (1915–2008), nom de guerre Bulow, Italian resistance leader
- SS Bülow, a German steam ocean liner built in 1906

== See also ==
- Bulow Creek State Park, a Florida state park near Ormond Beach
- Bulow Plantation Ruins Historic State Park, a Florida state park in Flagler Beach
