= Knock =

Knock may refer to:

== Places ==
=== Northern Ireland ===
- Knock, Belfast, County Down
- Knock, County Armagh, a townland in County Armagh

=== Republic of Ireland ===
- Knock, County Clare, village in County Clare
- Knock, County Mayo, village in County Mayo
- Knock Shrine, a major Roman Catholic pilgrimage site in the village of Knock, County Mayo
- Ireland West Airport, commonly known as Knock Airport

=== Scotland ===
- Knock, Mull, a place on the Isle of Mull, Argyll and Bute, Scotland
- Knock, Moray, a location
- Knock, Isle of Lewis, Outer Hebrides
- Knock railway station (Scotland), Aberdeenshire
- The Knock, West Lothian, highest natural summit of the Bathgate Hills

=== Elsewhere ===
- Knock, Cumbria, England
- Knock, East Frisia, Germany

== Art and entertainment ==
- Knock (play), a 1923 play by Jules Romains about a doctor
- "Knock" (short story), by Fredric Brown, supposedly the shortest short-story ever written
- The Knock (1994-2000), a UK television drama
- "The Knock (Drums of Death, Pt. 2)", a song by UNKLE from the album Psyence Fiction (1998)
- Knock (1925 film), a French silent comedy film
- Knock (1933 film), a French comedy film
- Knock (2017 film), a French film starring Omar Sy
- Dr. Knock, original titled Knock, a 1951 French comedy film
- "Knock" (song), a 2016 song by Alma
- "The Knock", a song by Moka Only from the album Flood, 2002

== Other uses ==
- Knock, to tap on a door
- Knock, a slang term meaning to render a negative evaluation or assessment
- Engine knocking, in spark-ignition internal combustion engines
- Knock Nevis, a Norwegian supertanker formerly known as Seawise Giant, Happy Giant, and Jahre Viking
- The Knock, another term for hitting the wall, in endurance sports
- The Knock, a slang term for HM Revenue and Customs, UK tax-collecting body
- Knock F.C., a football club in Belfast, Northern Ireland

== See also ==
- Getting the wind knocked out of you
- Knock Castle (disambiguation)
- Knock Knock (disambiguation)
- Knockabout (disambiguation)
- Knocking (disambiguation)
- Knockout, a winning criterion in some combat sports
- Knocks (disambiguation)
- Knokke, Belgium
- Nauck (disambiguation)
- NOC (disambiguation)
- Nock (disambiguation)
- Total Knock Out, also known as TKO
