= NOK =

Nok or NOK may refer to:

== Companies and organizations ==
- NYSE stock ticker for Nokia Corporation, based in Finland
- Nok Air, an airline of Thailand
- NOK Corporation, a Japanese manufacturer
- National Women's Organization (Narodowa Organizacja Kobiet or NOK), a socio-political organization in Poland
- Nintendo of Korea, the Korean division of the Japanese video game company Nintendo

== People ==
- Nok, the stage name of Yollada Suanyot, a politician and entertainer from Thailand
- Andrew Jonathan Nok, Nigerian scientist

== Places ==
- Nok, a village and archaeological site in Nigeria
- Nok (Togo), a cave and archaeological site in Togo
- Kiel Canal (Nord-Ostsee-Kanal), a canal in northern Germany
- Nok Kundi Tehsil, a town in Western Pakistan

== Other uses ==
- Nok (bird), a genus of birds
- Nok culture, an ancient civilization in Nigeria
- Next of kin, a person's closest living relative
- Nok, the main protagonist of the Nintendo DS version of the video game James Cameron's Avatar: The Game
- Norwegian krone (currency code: NOK)
- nok, the ISO 639 code for the Nooksack language

== See also ==
- Nock (disambiguation)
- Nøkk, Scandinavian water spirits
- NOC (disambiguation)
- Nauck (disambiguation)
