= Knocks =

Knocks may refer to:

- Knocks (Aghalurcher), a townland in County Fermanagh, Northern Ireland
- Knocks (Clones), a townland in County Fermanagh, Northern Ireland
- The Knocks, an American electronic music duo

== See also ==
- Knock (disambiguation)
- Knox (disambiguation)
- Nock (disambiguation)
