= Knock Knock =

Knock Knock may refer to:

- Knock-knock joke, a type of joke

== Film and television ==
- Knock Knock (1940 film), an animated short film noted for the first appearance of Woody Woodpecker
- Knock Knock (2007 film), a horror film featuring Stephanie Finochio
- Knock Knock (2015 film), an erotic horror film starring Keanu Reeves
- Knock Knock Live, a 2015 reality TV series
- "Knock, Knock", an episode of the animated TV series The Real Ghostbusters
- "Knock, Knock", an episode of the TV series Six Feet Under
- Knock Knock Woodpecker, a character on the TV series The Great Space Coaster
- "Knock Knock" (Doctor Who), an episode from the tenth series of Doctor Who
- "Knock, Knock" (Gotham), an episode from the second season of Gotham

== Music ==
=== Albums ===
- Knock Knock (DJ Koze album), 2018
- Knock Knock (Smog album), 1999
- Knock Knock, a mixtape by Misha B, 2013

=== Songs ===
- "Knock Knock" (Mac Miller song), 2010
- "Knock Knock" (Monica song), 2003
- "Knock Knock" (SoFaygo song), 2019
- "Knock Knock" (Twice song), 2017
- "Knock Knock", by the Dazz Band, 1981
- "Knock, Knock", by Dizzee Rascal from Showtime, 2004
- "Knock, Knock", by GZA from Legend of the Liquid Sword, 2002
- "Knock Knock", by the Hives from Veni Vidi Vicious, 2000
- "Knock Knock", by Jasmine, 2010
- "Knock, Knock", by Nikki Yanofsky from Little Secret, 2014

== Other uses ==
- Knock Knock (company), a California-based gift product and book publishing company
- Knock Knock (play), a 1976 play by Jules Feiffer, originally directed on Broadway by Marshall W. Mason
- Knock-Knock (video game), a 2013 video game by Ice-Pick Lodge

== See also ==
- Knock (disambiguation)
- Knock Knock Who?, a 2004 album by Kimya Dawson
- "Knock, Knock Who's There?", a 1970 song by Mary Hopkin
- Knock, Knock, Ginger, a children's game
- Knock Knock Knock, an EP by Hot Hot Heat
