= Knocking =

Knocking or Knockin or Knockin' may refer to:

- Knocking (2006 film), a documentary about Jehovah's Witnesses
- Knocking (2021 film), a Swedish thriller film
- Engine knocking, or the sound accompanying automotive combustion malfunction
- Port knocking, a covert method of opening a port on a server
- Roof knocking, a bombing practice of the Israeli Defense Forces
- Gene knockin, genetic engineering method
- Knockin Castle, castle situated in the village of Knockin on Shropshire between Oswestry and Shrewsbury
- Knocking, Austria, a hamlet, subdivision of Erlauf (municipality) in Austria
- "Knockin'", a 1995 song by Spanish band Double Vision
- "Knockin", a 2025 song by Mac DeMarco from Guitar
- "Knocking", a 2026 song by Ken carson from the album Xperiment

== See also ==
- Knock (disambiguation)
- Knockin' on Heaven's Door (disambiguation)
- The Knocking, a 2022 Finnish horror film
