= Inox =

Inox may refer to:

- Stainless steel, known as inox in French and some other languages
- Inox Air Products (Industrial Oxygen), Indian industrial and medical gases company
  - INOX Leisure Limited, Indian cinema company

== See also ==
- Nox (disambiguation)
