= Nox =

Nox may refer to:

== Science and technology ==
- NO_{x}, a generic term for the mono-nitrogen oxides:
  - Nitric oxide (NO)
  - Nitrogen dioxide (NO_{2})
- Nox (unit) (nx), a unit of illuminance
- Nox (platform), a piece of the software-defined networking ecosystem
- NADPH oxidase, a membrane-bound enzyme complex

== Entertainment ==
- Nox (Stargate), a race in the television series Stargate SG-1
- Nox (Marvel Comics), a fictional character appearing in the Marvel Comics universe, based loosely on Nyx of Greek mythology
- Nox (video game)
- Nox (band), a pop band from Hungary
- Nox, Noximilien, in the Wakfu cartoon series
- Nox, in the U.S. TV series Star-Crossed
- Nox, a fictional character in the series Incarnations of Immortality by Piers Anthony
- Helié de Montbel (codenamed Nox), an operator from Delta Force (2025 video game)
- NOX, a character from the Tokusatsu TV show, Kamen Rider ZEZTZ

== Other uses ==
- Nox (Night), the Roman equivalent of the Greek goddess Nyx
- Nox, Shropshire, a hamlet in England
- Nox (wrestler), ring name for Welsh professional wrestler Steffanie Rhiannon Newell
- N.O.X., another term used for Night of Pan

== See also ==
- Atrophaneura nox, the Malayan batwing butterfly
- Nox2, a subunit of NADPH oxidase
- Night (Latin: Nox)
- Knox (disambiguation)
- Knock (disambiguation)
- Nock (disambiguation)
- Nitrogen oxide (disambiguation)
