= K.I.D.S. =

Mixtape by Mac Miller
- Released: August 13, 2010
- Studio: I.D. Labs
- Genre: Hip-Hop
- Length: 50:14
- Label: Rostrum
- Producers: 93' P; Andrew Lloyd; B [dot] Jay; Black Diamond; DJ DMD; DT Spacely; ID Labs; Lord Finesse; Sayez; Scolla; Tecknowledgy; The Watcherz; Wally West; Willis Beats

Mac Miller chronology
The High Life (2009)	K.I.D.S. (2010)	Best Day Ever (2011)

Professional ratings
Review scores
Source	Rating
Allmusic	3.5/5 stars

K.I.D.S. (backronym for Kickin' Incredibly Dope Shit) is the fourth mixtape by American rapper Mac Miller. It was released by Rostrum Records on August 13, 2010, through DatPiff. The title is a reference to the 1995 drama film Kids, which is quoted throughout the mixtape. It was later commercially released on April 29, 2020. A deluxe version was released on its 10th anniversary and includes two new tracks, "Ayye" and "Back In The Day".

== Content and release ==
Seven songs from K.I.D.S. had music videos created for them: "Nikes On My Feet", "Kool Aid & Frozen Pizza", "Knock Knock", "Senior Skip Day", "La La La La", "Traffic in the Sky", and "Don't Mind If I Do". The videos for "Nikes on My Feet" and "Kool Aid & Frozen Pizza" were both heavily played on YouTube, reaching over 50 million views each. Both songs featured prominent classic hip-hop samples, from Q-Tip's remix of Nas' "The World Is Yours" and Lord Finesse's "Hip 2 Da Game", respectively. In July 2012, Finesse filed a $10 million lawsuit against Miller, Rostrum and DatPiff for use of the sample. The lawsuit was settled out of court in December 2012, with its stipulations kept confidential.

To support the mixtape, Miller embarked on his first tour in early 2011, the "Incredibly Dope Tour". Miller sold out at every location on the tour.

The mixtape was released on streaming services for the first time on April 29, 2020. The songs "Traffic in the Sky" and "La La La La" were absent from this release due to issues clearing the samples. A deluxe version was released soon after on its 10th anniversary. The deluxe edition included two previously unreleased songs, "Ayye" and "Back In The Day".

== Track listing ==
All lyrics are written by Mac Miller.

K.I.D.S. track listing
No.	Title	Producer(s)	Length
1.	"Kickin' Incredibly Dope Shit (Intro)"	DT Spacely	3:45
2.	"Outside"	Sayez	3:37
3.	"Get Em Up"	93' P	3:18
4.	"Nikes on My Feet"	Black Diamond	2:44
5.	"Senior Skip Day"	Wally West	2:56
6.	"The Spins" (with Empire of the Sun)	B. Jay	3:16
7.	"Traffic in the Sky"	Scolla and Tecknowledgy	2:33
8.	"Don't Mind If I Do"	The WatcherZ	2:18
9.	"Paper Route" (featuring Chevy Woods)	Sayez	3:00
10.	"Good Evening"	B [dot] Jay	3:55
11.	"Ride Around"	DJ DMD	2:24
12.	"Knock Knock"	E. Dan	3:18
13.	"Mad Flava, Heavy Flow (Interlude)" (featuring DJ Bonics)		0:27
14.	"Kool Aid & Frozen Pizza"	Lord Finesse	2:38
15.	"All I Want Is You"	Willis Beats	3:43
16.	"Poppy"	Black Diamond	2:53
17.	"Face in the Crowd"	Andrew Lloyd	3:29
Total length:			50:14

Bonus track
No.	Title	Producer(s)	Length
18.	"La La La La"	Up North Productions	2:27
Total length:			52:41

Tenth anniversary deluxe edition
No.	Title	Producer(s)	Length
18.	"Ayye"	E. Dan	2:46
19.	"Back in the Day"	Will Brown	4:07
Total length:			57:46

Notes

- Empire of the Sun is not credited on the original issue of "The Spins"; credit was later added due to the track's sample of their song "Half Mast".
- "Traffic in the Sky" and "La La La La" are omitted from many commercial releases due to disputes between the sample owners and Miller's team.

== Personnel ==
All credits are adapted from the liner notes of K.I.D.S..

- Mac Miller - vocals (all)
- Benjy Grinberg - executive producer
- Big Jerm - vocal recording
- E. Dan - mixing and mastering
- Bill Niels - cover photo
- Red Tape Design - artwork
- Arthur Pitt - press
- Quentin Cuff - management

== Charts ==
Chart performance for K.I.D.S.
Chart (2020)	Peak position
US Billboard 200	62

== Certifications ==
Certifications and sales
Region	Certification	Certified units/sales
Denmark (IFPI Danmark)	Gold	10,000^{‡}
New Zealand (RMNZ)	Platinum	15,000^{‡}
^{‡} Sales+streaming figures based on certification alone.
