= Kool Aid & Frozen Pizza =

2010 single by Mac Miller

Single by Mac Miller

from the album K.I.D.S.
- Released: July 26, 2010
- Genre: Frat rap
- Length: 2:39
- Label: Rostrum
- Songwriters: Malcolm McCormick; Robert Hall
- Producer: Lord Finesse

Mac Miller singles chronology
"Nikes on My Feet" (2010)	"Kool Aid & Frozen Pizza" (2010)	"Knock Knock" (2010)

Music video
- "Kool Aid & Frozen Pizza" on YouTube

"Kool Aid & Frozen Pizza" is a song by American rapper Mac Miller, released on July 26, 2010 as the second single from his fourth mixtape K.I.D.S. (2010). It contains a sample of "Hip 2 Da Game" by Lord Finesse.

== Composition ==
According to Mac Miller, the song is about "recreating a hot summer day, walking around meeting people and doing things." Kyann-Sian Williams of NME described that it sees Miller "encapsulate that carefree spirit of adolescence", adding that he "innovated jubilant and hedonistic frat-rap into an exploration of youthful ambition and mischief."

== Critical reception ==
DJBooth stated the song "captures the essence of early Mac Miller. There's a baked-in reverence for hip-hop with the Lord Finesse sample, coupled with playful bars and a well-structured delivery. To me, this song is the start of something special. It's a promise from Mac Miller to fans: He's in this, for real. Moreover, 'Kool-Aid and Frozen Pizza' is the soundtrack to hungover mornings, lazy Sundays, and nights in."

== Lawsuit ==
In July 2012, Lord Finesse filed a lawsuit against Mac Miller, Rostrum Records and DatPiff over the song's sample of "Hip 2 Da Game", accusing Miller of profiting from unauthorized use of the song. Finesse had sued them after they refused to respond to a cease and desist letter earlier in the month. Miller defended on Twitter that he was merely paying homage, further stating that he had spoken with Finesse about the song on the phone for an hour after he heard it and they had apparently resolved it, even planning to work on music together. Finesse responded that "Mixtapes are one thing, but you can't take someone's else's entire song, shoot a music video and call it your own." Miller pointed out that even Finesse never cleared a sample used in "Hip 2 Da Game", to which Finesse tweeted "This case is about the overall picture.. If you're just looking at 'one' point.. It's about so much more #look deeper.."

Rostrum Records responded to the lawsuit with the statement:

There have been a lot of misstatements online and in the press, so we thought it'd be best to make some brief comments. First and foremost, we stand by Mac Miller in this situation and we will fight the case together with him. Mac never pretended that the "Hip 2 Da Game" beat was his, despite what's being said in the suit. Lord Finesse was given credit on both the video and the mixtape from the very beginning. We've never distributed "Kool Aid & Frozen Pizza" for sale on iTunes and have consistently policed digital retailers and other sites to make sure that no pirates were ever illegally selling the song. Lord Finesse has known about 'Kool Aid & Frozen Pizza' for a long time and never objected to the use. For some reason, he has very recently changed his mind.

== Legacy ==
Rapper Logic credited the song as an inspiration to create his track "Young Sinatra", which has become an alter ego.

== Certifications ==
Region	Certification	Certified units/sales
New Zealand (RMNZ)	Gold	15,000^{‡}
United States (RIAA)	Gold	500,000^{‡}
^{‡} Sales+streaming figures based on certification alone.
