= Bulow Creek State Park =

State park in Florida, United States

- IUCN category IV (habitat/species management area)
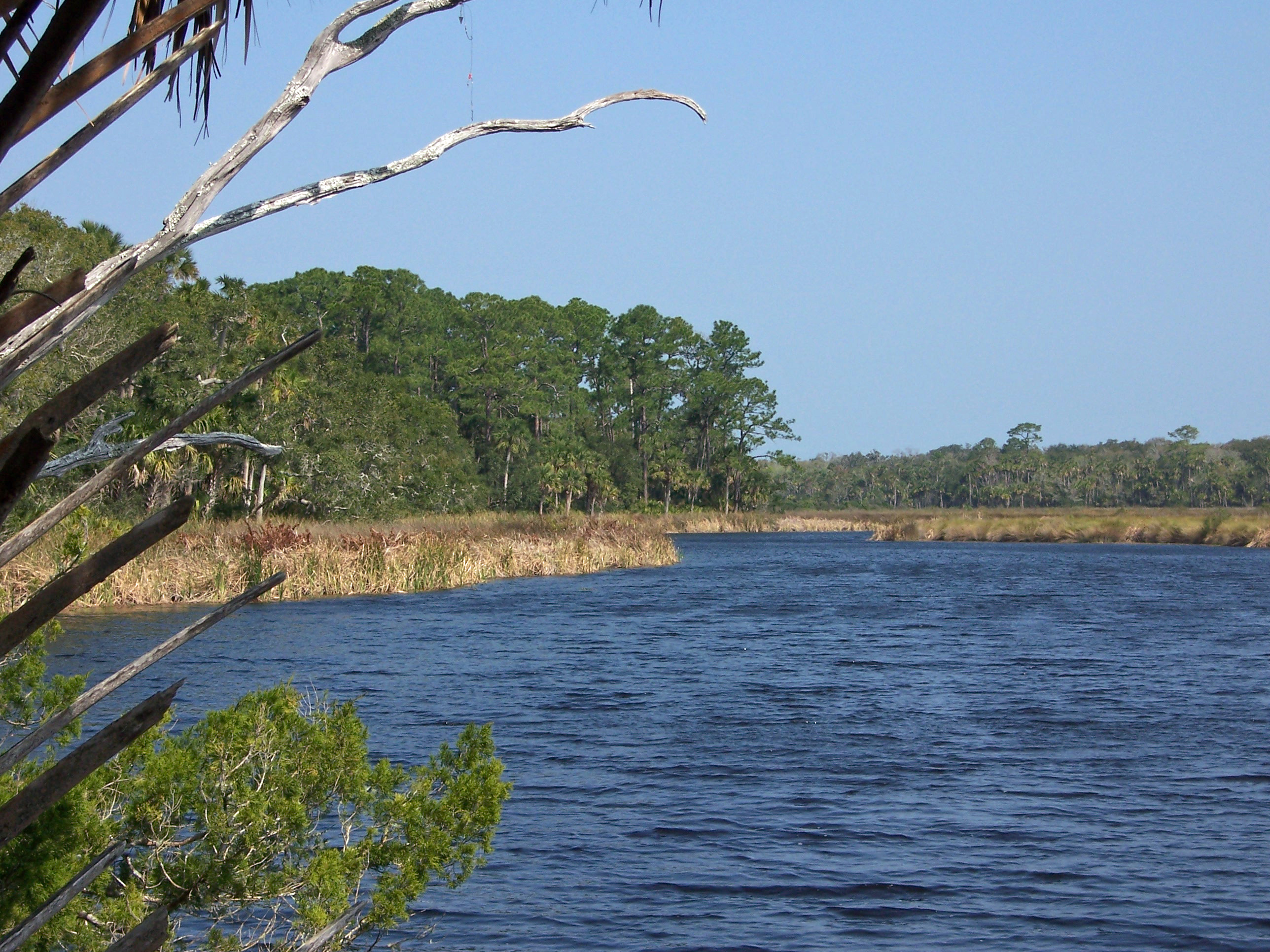

- Location within Florida Location within the United States
- Interactive map of Bulow Creek State Park
- Location: Volusia County, Florida, United States
- Nearest city: Ormond Beach, Florida
- Coordinates: 29°24′32″N 81°07′59″W
- Area: 3,230 acres (13.1 km^{2})
- Established: 1981
- Governing body: Florida Department of Environmental Protection

Bulow Creek State Park is a Florida State Park located five miles (8 km) north of Ormond Beach. It is on Old Dixie Highway (CR 4011), next to the Atlantic Ocean. The park is adjacent to Bulow Plantation Ruins Historic State Park, and close to North Peninsula State Park, Gamble Rogers Memorial State Recreation Area and Tomoka State Park.

== Ecology ==
=== Flora ===
Containing one of the largest stands of southern live oak remaining on the east coast of Florida, the park's "star" is the Fairchild Oak. Over four centuries old, it is among the largest of its kind in the southern United States.

=== Fauna ===
Among the wildlife of the park are white-tailed deer, barred owls and raccoons.

== Recreational activities ==
Activities include hiking, canoeing, picnicing, wildlife viewing and primitive camping. Amenities include nature trails, a picnic pavilion and a primitive campsite. The Bulow Woods Trail, more than six miles (10 km) long, leads to Bulow Plantation Ruins Historic State Park.

The Wahlin Trail is a 0.3-mile (0.48 km) loop through the woods behind the Fairchild Oak.

== Hours ==
Florida state parks are open between 8 a.m. and sundown every day of the year (including holidays).

== Gallery ==
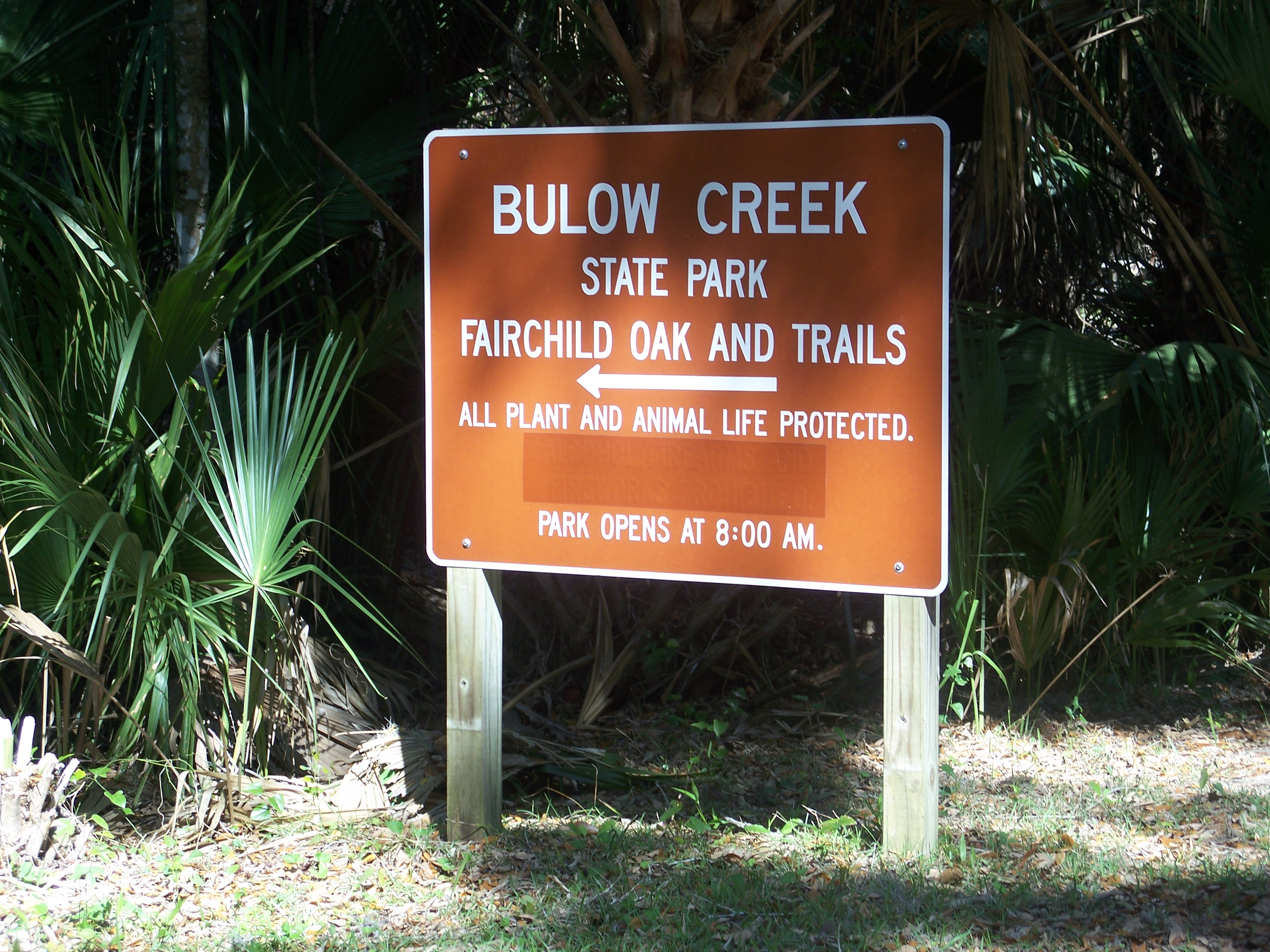
Park sign

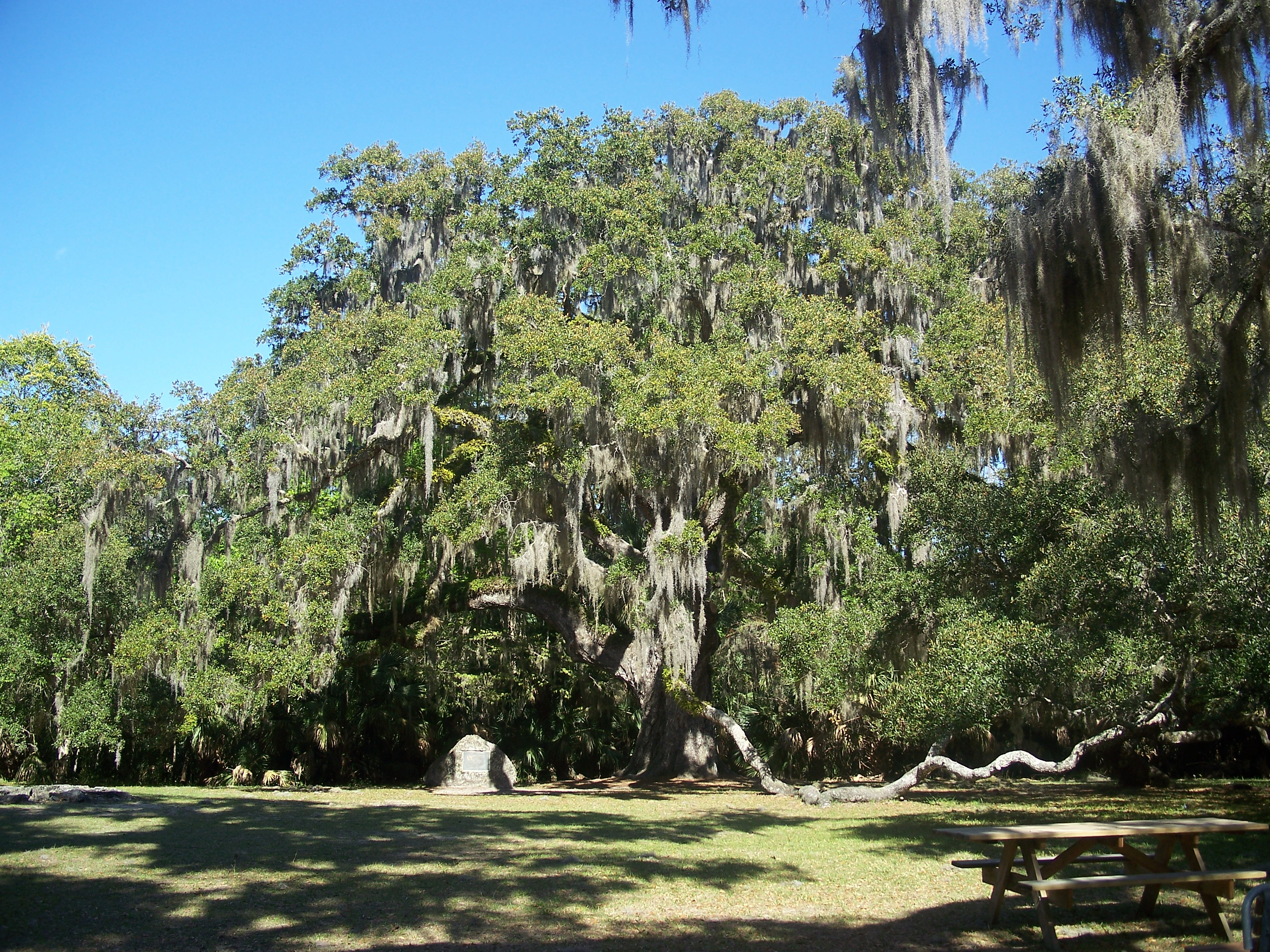
Fairchild Oak

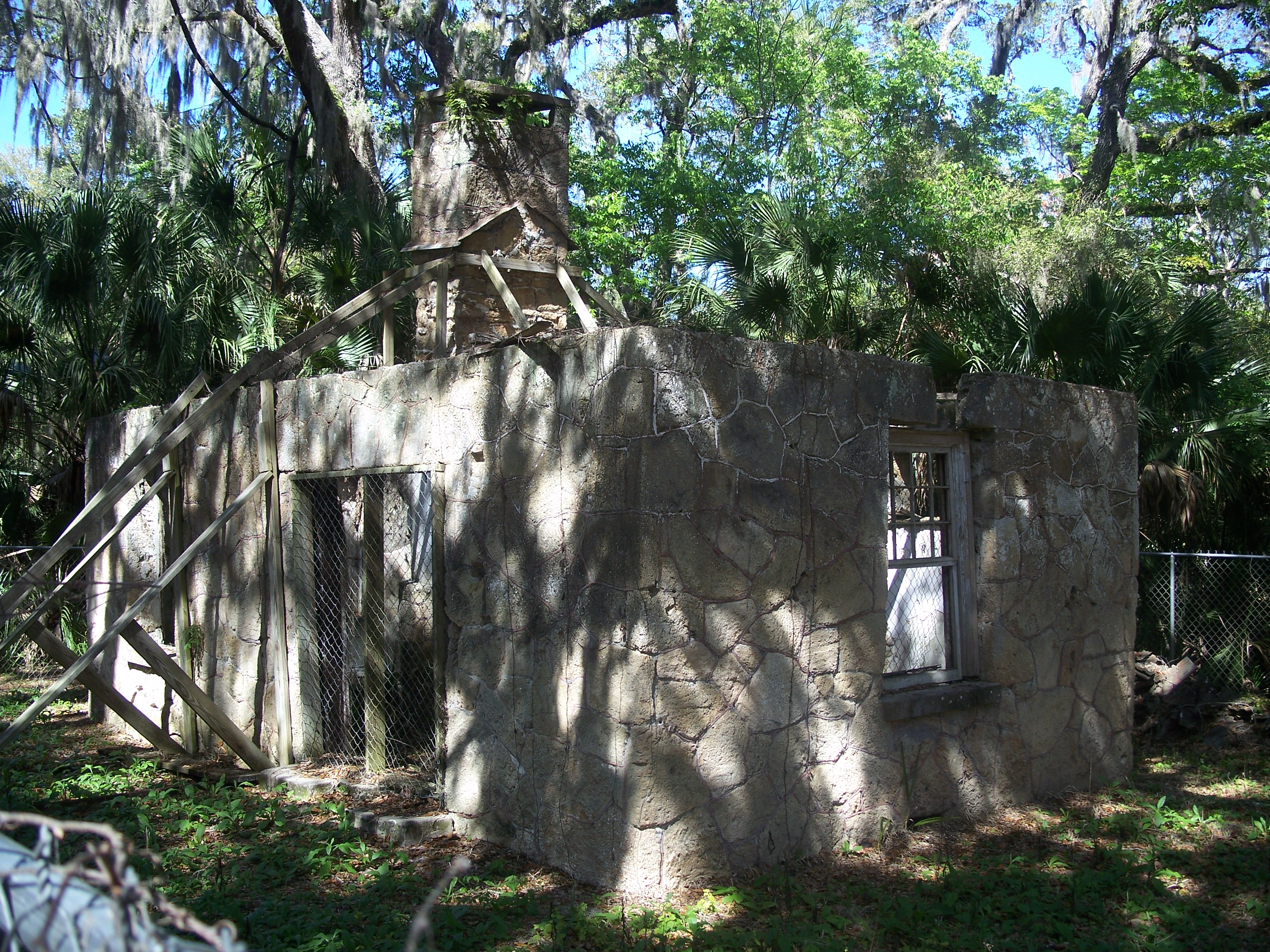
Conrad-Oates building
