= KNOX =

KNOX may refer to:

- KNOX (AM), a radio station (1310 AM) licensed to Grand Forks, North Dakota, United States
- KNOX-FM, the former call letters of KZGF, a radio station (94.7 FM) licensed to Grand Forks, North Dakota, United States
- KNOX (genes), a family of genes in plants which control morphology, including of leaves and flowers
- KNOX (candles), a traditional incense firm in Saxony, Germany
- Samsung KNOX, an enterprise mobile security solution

== See also ==
- Knox (disambiguation)
