= NOC =

NOC or Noc may refer to:

== Organizations ==
- Ireland West Airport Knock, Ireland (IATA code)
- Nantahala Outdoor Center, a river outfitter in western North Carolina
- National Oceanography Centre (NOC), UK
- National Oceanography Centre, Liverpool (NOCL), UK, see Proudman Oceanographic Laboratory
- National Oceanography Centre, Southampton (NOCS), UK
- National oil company (NOC)
- National Oil Corporation the national oil company of Libya
- National Olympic Committee, a group eligible to enter athletes and teams into an Olympic Games
- Nepal Oil Corporation, a state owned petroleum products trading enterprise of Nepal.
- Nippon Oil Corporation, a Japanese company, see Eneos
- North Oil Company, an Iraqi oil company
- North Oil Company (Qatar), a Qatari oil company
- Northeast Ohio Conference, a high school athletics conference
- Northern Oklahoma College, a community college located in Tonkawa, Oklahoma
- Northrop Grumman, its stock symbol
- Night Owl Cinematics, a production company based in Singapore

== Computer/technology terms ==
- Network on chip, a term in electronic system design
- Network operations center, a computer networking term

== Other uses ==
- Noc, an extinct Native American tribe from Michigan
- Noć, a village in Poland
- NOC (whale), a beluga whale known for imitating human vocalizations
- National Occupational Classification, a Canadian classification system of occupations
- No Objection Certificate, such as in Indian law about travel from Nepal
- No overall control, a UK political term, especially indicating that no party has a majority on a local council
- Non-official cover, an espionage and intelligence term, for covert and presumably un-tied operatives
- Nursing Outcomes Classification
- WWE Night of Champions, a WWE pay per view

== See also ==
- NOK (disambiguation)
- Nock (disambiguation)
