= Knockin' on Heaven's Door (disambiguation) =

"Knockin' on Heaven's Door" is a 1973 song written by Bob Dylan.

Knocking on Heaven's Door may also refer to:

- Knockin' on Heaven's Door, a 1974 album by Arthur Louis
- "The Beginning and the End, or 'Knockin' on Heaven's Door", a 1996 episode of the TV series Neon Genesis Evangelion
- "Knockin' on Heaven's Door", a 1997 song by Avalon from their album A Maze of Grace
- Knockin' on Heaven's Door (1997 film)
- Knocking on Heaven's Door (2014 film)
- Cowboy Bebop: Knockin' on Heaven's Door, a 2001 Japanese anime film
- Knocking On Heaven's Door, a 2009 documentary by Anthony Sherwood
- Knocking on Heaven's Door (book), a book by Lisa Randall (2011)
