= North Peninsula State Park =

State park in Florida, United States

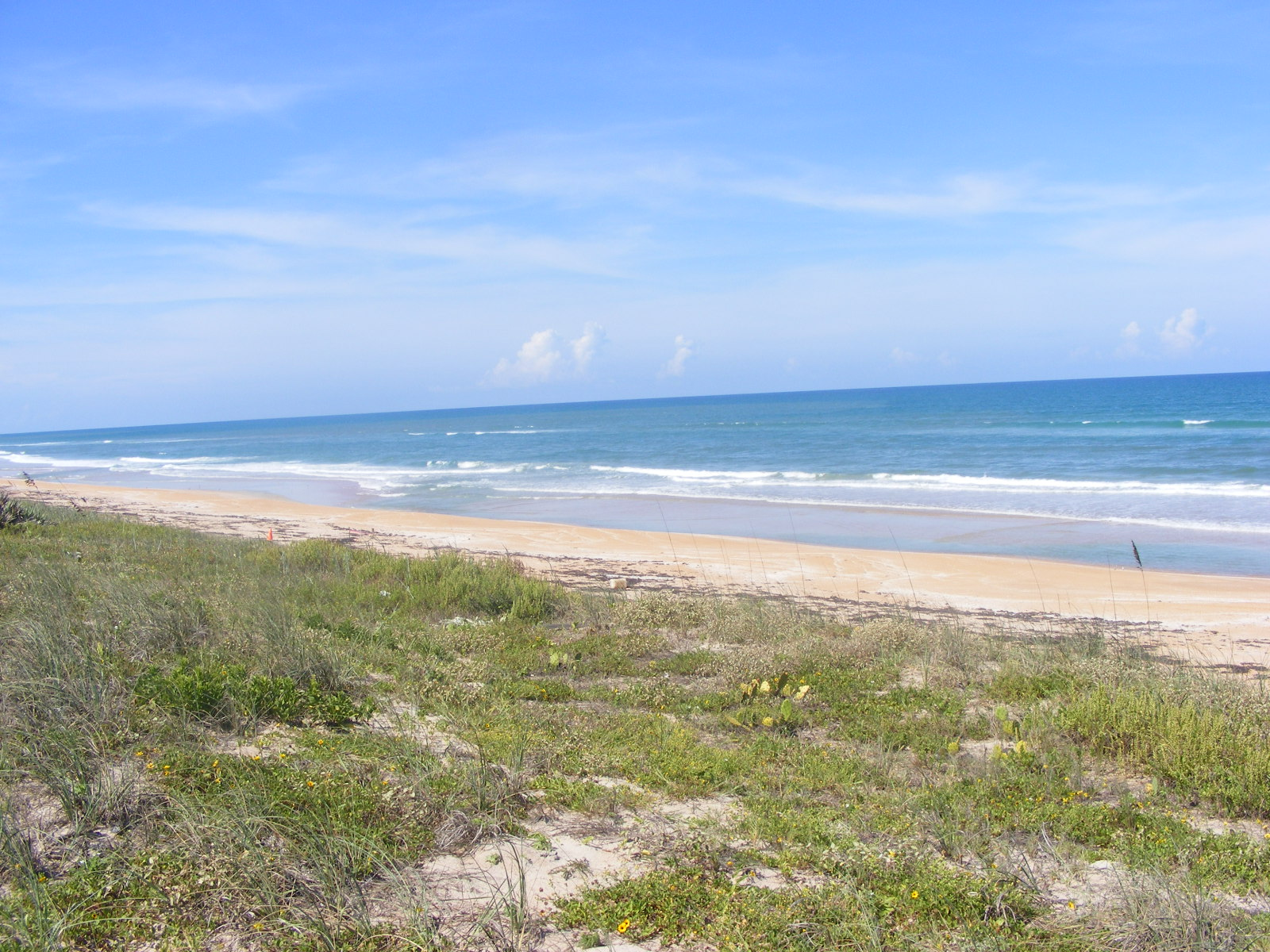
- Beachfront vegetation in the park

- Location within Florida Location within the United States
- Interactive map of North Peninsula State Park
- Location: Volusia County, Florida, USA
- Nearest city: Ormond-By-The-Sea, Florida
- Coordinates: 29°23′36″N 81°5′19″W
- Governing body: Florida Department of Environmental Protection

North Peninsula State Park is a Florida State Park, located north of Ormond-By-The-Sea and east of the Bulow Plantation Ruins Historic State Park, off A1A.

Loggerhead and green sea turtles, and occasionally leatherback sea turtles, nest on the park's beaches from May through September.

The Coastal Strand Trail begins at Smith Creek Landing and passes through maritime hammock and coastal strand habitats.

== Images ==
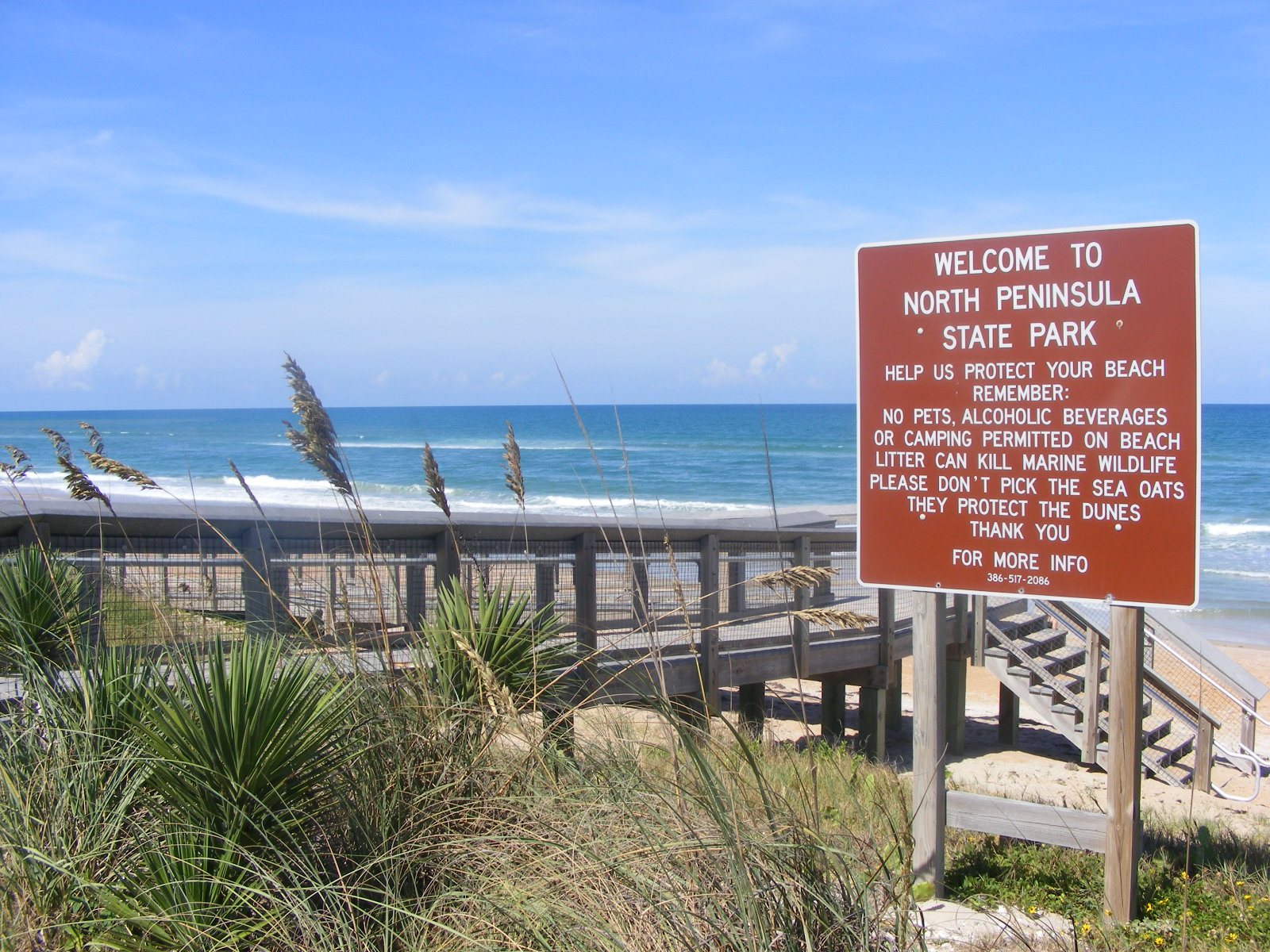
Beach access ramp at North Peninsula State Park

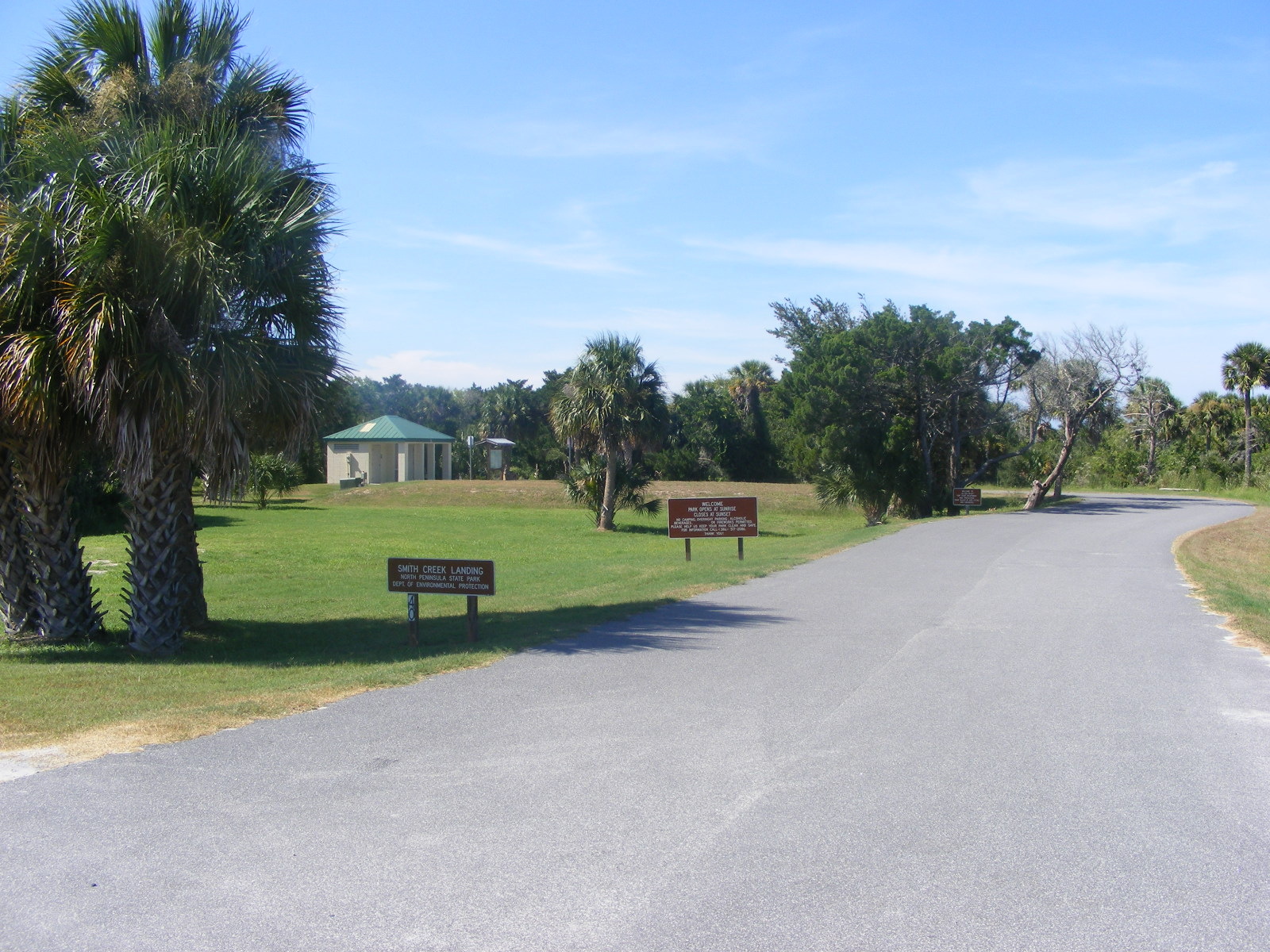
Entrance to Smith Creek Landing at North Peninsula State Park

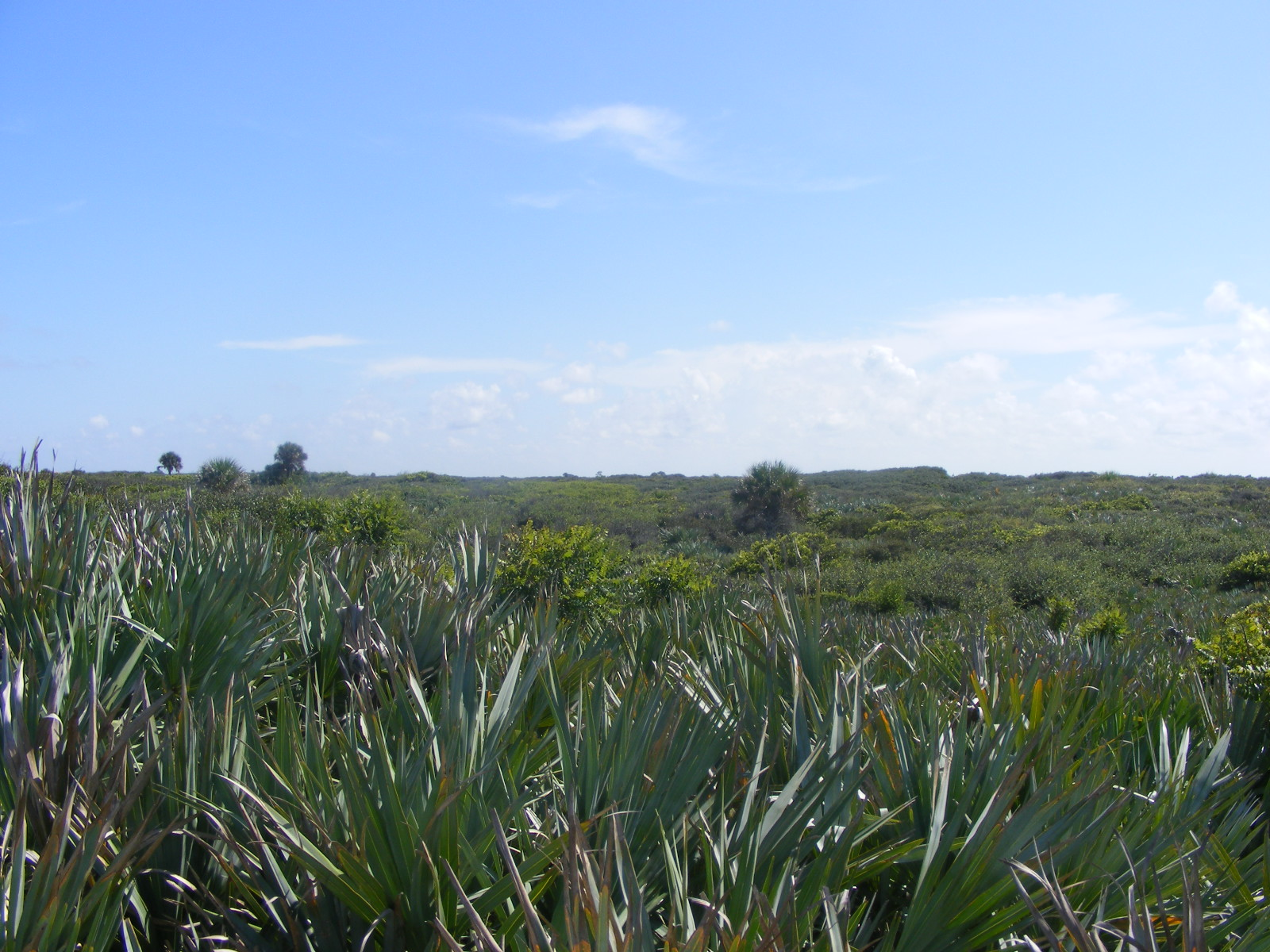
Natural landscape at North Peninsula State Park

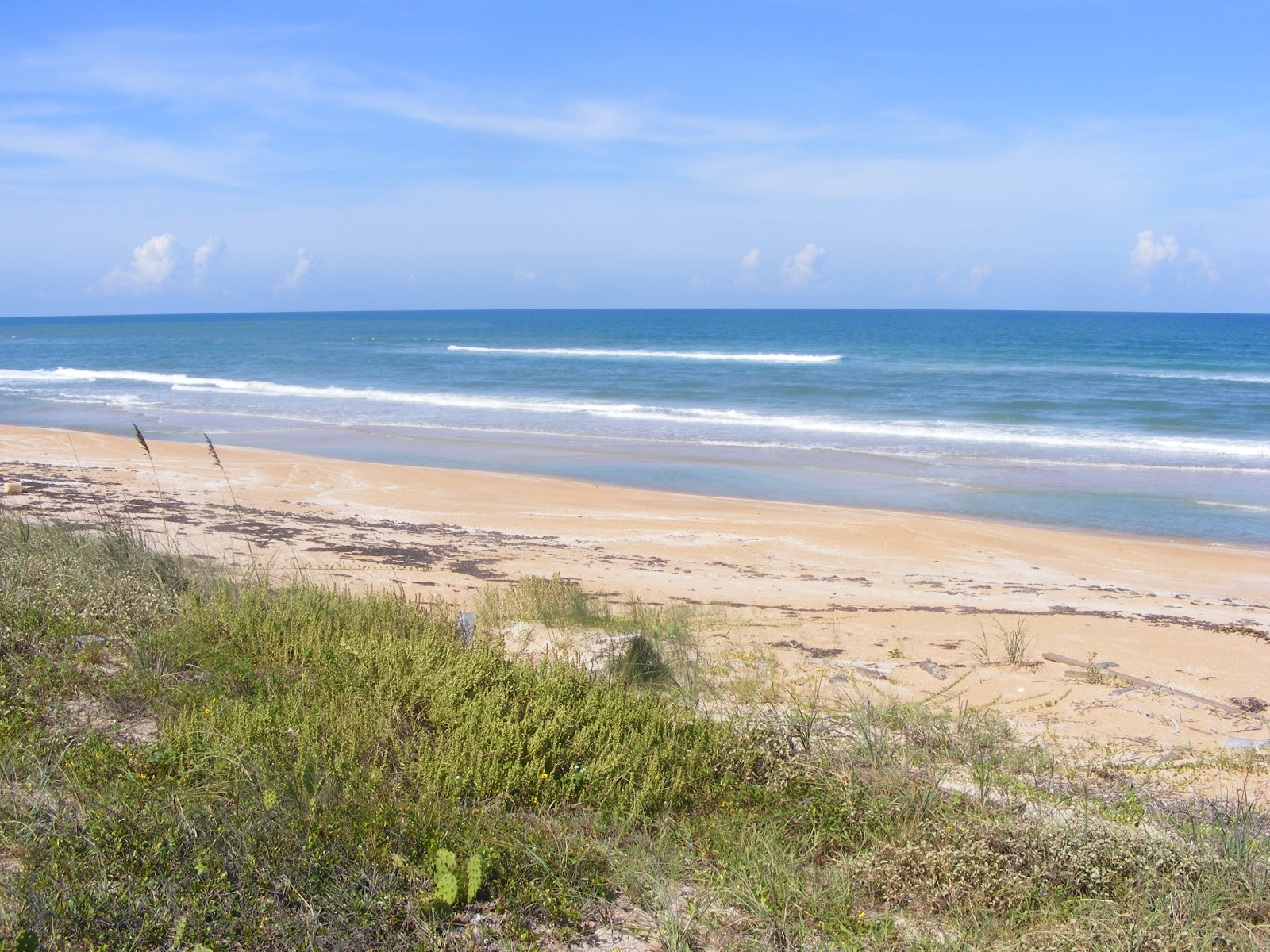
Natural beach at North Peninsula State Park
