= Nauck =

Nauck may refer to:

- Johann August Nauck (1822-1892), German classical scholar
- Todd Nauck (born 1971), American comic book writer and artist
- Nauck, Virginia, a neighborhood in Arlington, Virginia

== See also ==
- Knock (disambiguation)
- Nock (disambiguation)
