= Knockabout =

Knockabout may refer to:

- Cape Cod Knockabout, a type of boat
- Knockabout (film), a 1979 Hong Kong martial arts film
- Knockabout Comics, a comic publisher
