= Knox Memorial Bridge =

Bridge in Florida, United States of America

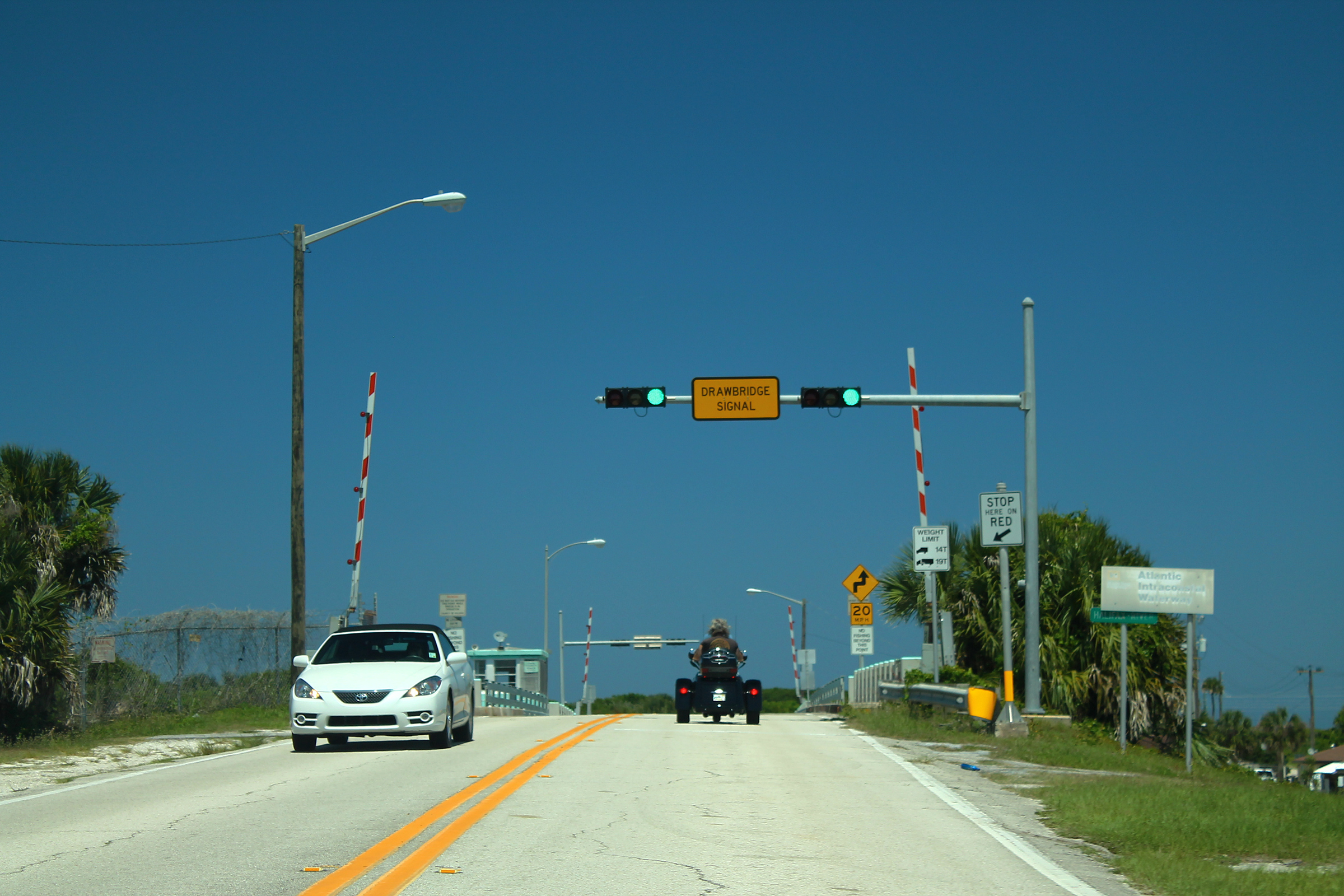
- Eastbound along Volusia CR 2002 as it approaches the Knox Memorial Bridge
- Coordinates: 29.4083°N 81.1012°W
- Carries: CR 2002
- Crosses: Intracoastal Waterway
- Locale: North of Ormond Beach, Florida
- Official name: Knox Memorial Bridge
- Maintained by: Volusia County
- ID number: 794025

Characteristics
- Design: steel bascule bridge
- Total length: 94.2 meters (309 feet)
- Width: 11.3 meters (37 feet)
- Longest span: 31.4 meters (103 feet)
- Clearance above: N/A
- Clearance below: 4.8 meters (16 feet) closed

History
- Opened: 1955

The Knox Memorial Bridge crosses the Intracoastal Waterway north of Ormond Beach, Florida. Highbridge Road (CR 2002) passes over the bridge.

== History ==
Highbridge Road was built at the latest around 1910 as part of the John Anderson Highway, which became part of the Dixie Highway around 1915. The section north of Highbridge Road is still known as John Anderson Highway; the section to the south is now John Anderson Drive.

The Intracoastal Waterway in the area was built in 1890. The current bridge was built in 1955, and according to USGS topographic maps, the road was a bit to the south before then. There may have been a ferry at the location before 1955, or possibly a lower bridge.

== Florida Scenic Route ==
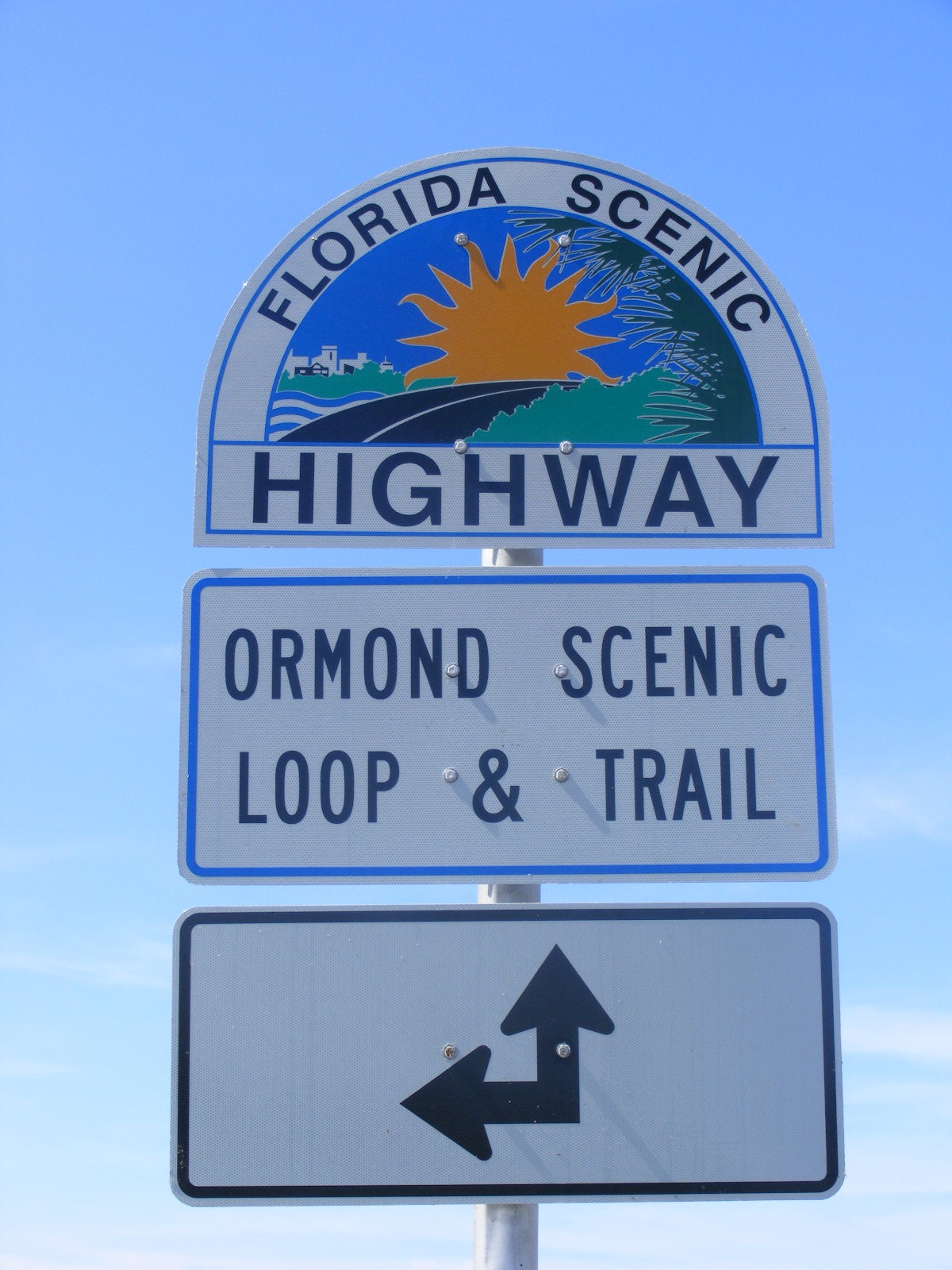
Ormond Scenic Loop and Trail

Knox Memorial Bridge is part of the northern leg of the Ormond Scenic Loop and Trail, a Florida Scenic Highway, designated on July 9, 2007.
