= National Women's Organization =

- Klub Polityczny Kobiet Postępowych
- Formation: 1918
- Dissolved: 1939
- Purpose: Support women's rights
- Official language: Polish

National Women's Organization (NOK) (Polish: Narodowa Organizacja Kobiet) was a Polish women's organisation. It was founded in 1918 as a branch of the National Democracy party. It was a Catholic Conservative women's association who encouraged conservative women to participate in society.
