= Knock Castle =

Knock Castle may refer to

- Knock Castle (Isle of Skye), Scotland
- Knock Castle (Aberdeenshire), Scotland
- Knock Castle, Largs, North Ayrshire, Scotland
- Castleknock, Ireland
