= Knox Township =

Knox Township may refer to:

- Knox Township, Knox County, Illinois
- Knox Township, Jay County, Indiana
- Knox Township, Clarke County, Iowa
- Knox Township, Pottawattamie County, Iowa
- Knox Township, Benson County, North Dakota
- Knox Township, Columbiana County, Ohio
- Knox Township, Guernsey County, Ohio
- Knox Township, Holmes County, Ohio
- Knox Township, Jefferson County, Ohio
- Knox Township, Vinton County, Ohio
- Knox Township, Clarion County, Pennsylvania
- Knox Township, Clearfield County, Pennsylvania
- Knox Township, Jefferson County, Pennsylvania
