= Knock Knock (Mac Miller song) =

2010 single by Mac Miller

Single by Mac Miller

from the album K.I.D.S.
- Released: August 13, 2010
- Genre: Hip hop
- Length: 3:22
- Label: Rostrum
- Songwriters: Malcolm McCormick; E. Dan; Jerome Kern; Oscar Hammerstein II
- Producers: Dan; ID Labs

Mac Miller singles chronology
"Kool Aid & Frozen Pizza" (2010)	"Knock Knock" (2010)	"Senior Skip Day" (2010)

Music video
- "Knock Knock" on YouTube

"Knock Knock" is a song by American rapper Mac Miller, released on August 13, 2010 as the third single from his fourth mixtape K.I.D.S. (2010). Produced by E. Dan and ID Labs, it contains a sample of "I've Told Every Little Star" by Linda Scott.

== Music video ==
The music video was released on November 23, 2010. It features choreography dancing and doing knocking gestures, as well as a school dance scene. Rex Arrow, the director of the video, discussed the creation of the video in an interview with DJBooth:

When Malcolm first played me the track, we both kind of jumped to "It would be cool to do something that was kind of a throwback." That sort of slowly evolved, and the idea of mixing black and white, and color came in. I had done some dance stuff in college, and musical theatre in high school. I was like, "Look, man, it may sound strange but I think it would be cool if we kinda did something that felt a little Westside Story." It was a cold day in November. We shot the whole thing in one day, which is crazy to think about now. The moment he wrapped his head around it, he was 100 percent down. From the black and white stuff, to him sort of lucking into finding this varsity style that he found a week before, it added the perfect element to the video. He was a total champ about doing the stuff that was more dancey. When we moved into the studio to do the color stuff, it was amazing to watch him perform. He jumped into that character and there were 40, 50 people in that room, and he had them all completely charmed that entire time.

== Charts ==
Chart performance for "Knock Knock"
Chart (2012)	Peak position
Canada Hot 100 (Billboard)	71
US Billboard Hot 100	88

== Certifications ==
Region	Certification	Certified units/sales
New Zealand (RMNZ)	Gold	15,000^{‡}
United States (RIAA)	Platinum	1,000,000^{‡}
^{‡} Sales+streaming figures based on certification alone.

== Trivia ==
An shorten version of the song is heard during the Seventh Inning Stretch during Pittsburgh Pirates home games since 2021 which contains the line “Keep on smilin’ like an Eat N Park cookie.”
