= Knox County =

There are nine counties named Knox County in the United States, all named after Brigadier General Henry Knox who would later serve as the first Secretary of War:

- Knox County, Illinois
- Knox County, Indiana
- Knox County, Kentucky
- Knox County, Maine
- Knox County, Missouri
- Knox County, Nebraska
- Knox County, Ohio
- Knox County, Tennessee, whose county seat is the city of Knoxville
- Knox County, Texas
