= Nock =

Nock may refer to:

== Archery ==
- In a bow and arrow, two notches near the bow's respective ends, for attaching the bowstring
- Nock (arrow), in an arrow, the notch in the fletched (feathered) end of the arrow, for engaging the bowstring

== People ==
- Henry Nock (1741–1804), British gunsmith, founder of Wilkinson Sword
- David Nock (1829–1909), politician in South Australia
- William Nock (cricketer) (1864–1909), West Indian cricketer
- Albert Jay Nock (1873–1945), American author
- Arthur Darby Nock (1902–1963), English classical scholar and theologian
- O. S. Nock (1905–1994), British engineer and railway historian
- Bello Nock (born 1968), American circus performer

== Other uses ==
- Nock gun, a seven-barrelled volley gun
- National Oil Corporation of Kenya
- Nock, a low-level functional programming language used in Urbit

== See also ==
- Knock (disambiguation)
- Nauck (disambiguation)
- NOK (disambiguation)
