= Bulow Plantation Ruins Historic State Park =

- U.S. National Register of Historic Places
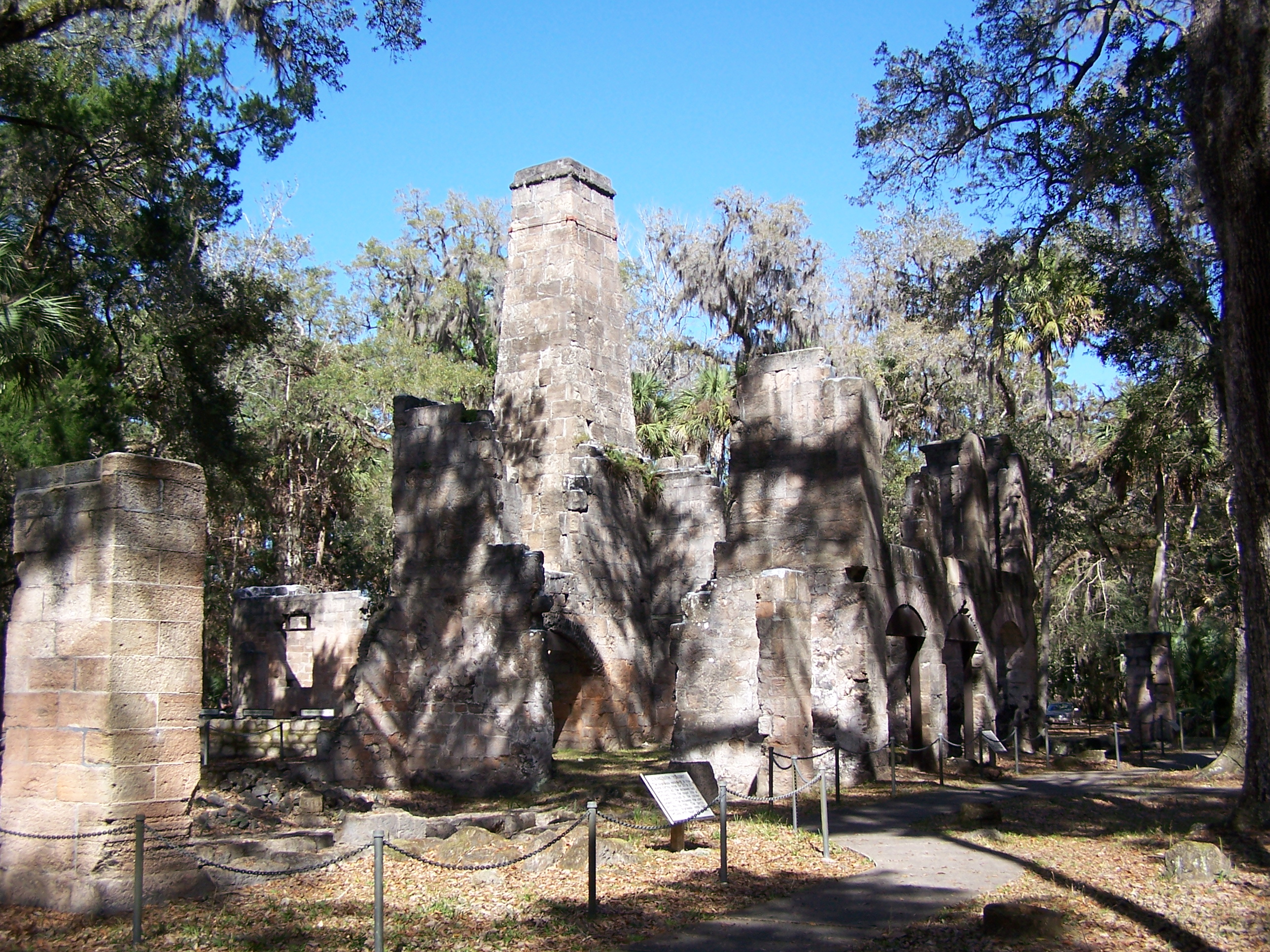
- Sugar mill ruins

- Location within Florida Location within the United States
- Interactive map of Bulow Plantation Ruins Historic State Park
- Location: Flagler County, Florida, USA
- Nearest city: Bunnell, Florida
- Coordinates: 29°26′10″N 81°08′28″W
- Area: 109 acres (44 ha)
- Built: 1836
- NRHP reference No.: 70000185
- Added to NRHP: 29 September 1970

Bulow Plantation Ruins Historic State Park is a Florida State Park in Flagler Beach, Florida. It is three miles west of Flagler Beach on CR 2001, south of SR 100, and contains the ruins of an antebellum plantation and its sugar mill, built of coquina, a fossiliferous sedimentary rock composed of shells. It was the largest plantation in East Florida, and was operated with the forced labor of enslaved Africans and African Americans.

== History ==
The plantation was developed beginning in 1821 by Major Charles Wilhelm Bulow, who acquired 1,892 ha (4,675 acres) on a tidal creek (later Bulow Creek). He had 890 ha (2,200 acres) cleared by the labor of his enslaved workforce for the cultivation of commodity crops: indigo, cotton, rice, and sugarcane. At his death in 1823, his seventeen-year-old son, John Joachim Bulow inherited the property and managed it. At Christmas 1831 into January 1832, Bulow hosted the artist and naturalist John James Audubon, who explored the area in his continuing study of American birds. About that time, Bulow had a sugar mill constructed on his property. The plantation was destroyed in the Seminole War of 1836.

The property and ruins were acquired by the State of Florida in 1945 and dedicated as a State Historic Park in 1957. It was added to the National Register of Historic Places on 29 September 1970.

== Fauna ==
Among the wildlife of the park are bald eagles, swallow-tailed kites, and Florida manatees.

== Recreational activities ==
Activities include hiking, fishing, wildlife viewing, canoeing and kayaking, and picnicking. Amenities include a 6.8 mile hiking trail, a boat ramp, and a screened picnic pavilion. Bulow Creek is recognized as a State Canoe Trail. The park's interpretive center features original artifacts and exhibits about the Bulow Plantation.

== Hours ==
The park is open between 9:00 AM and 5:00 PM Thursday through Monday. Bulow Plantation Ruins Historic State Park is closed on Tuesdays and Wednesdays.

== Gallery ==
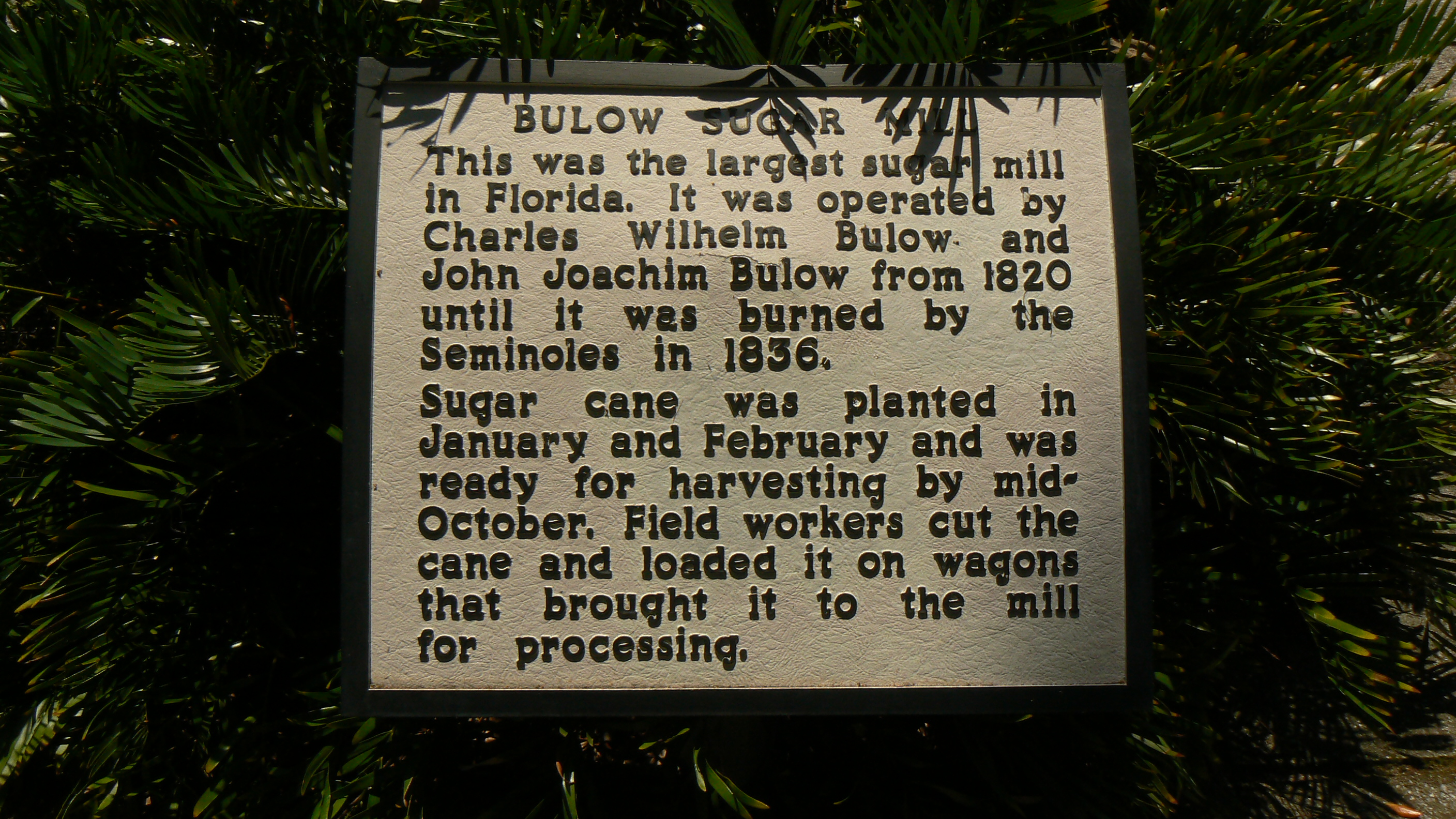

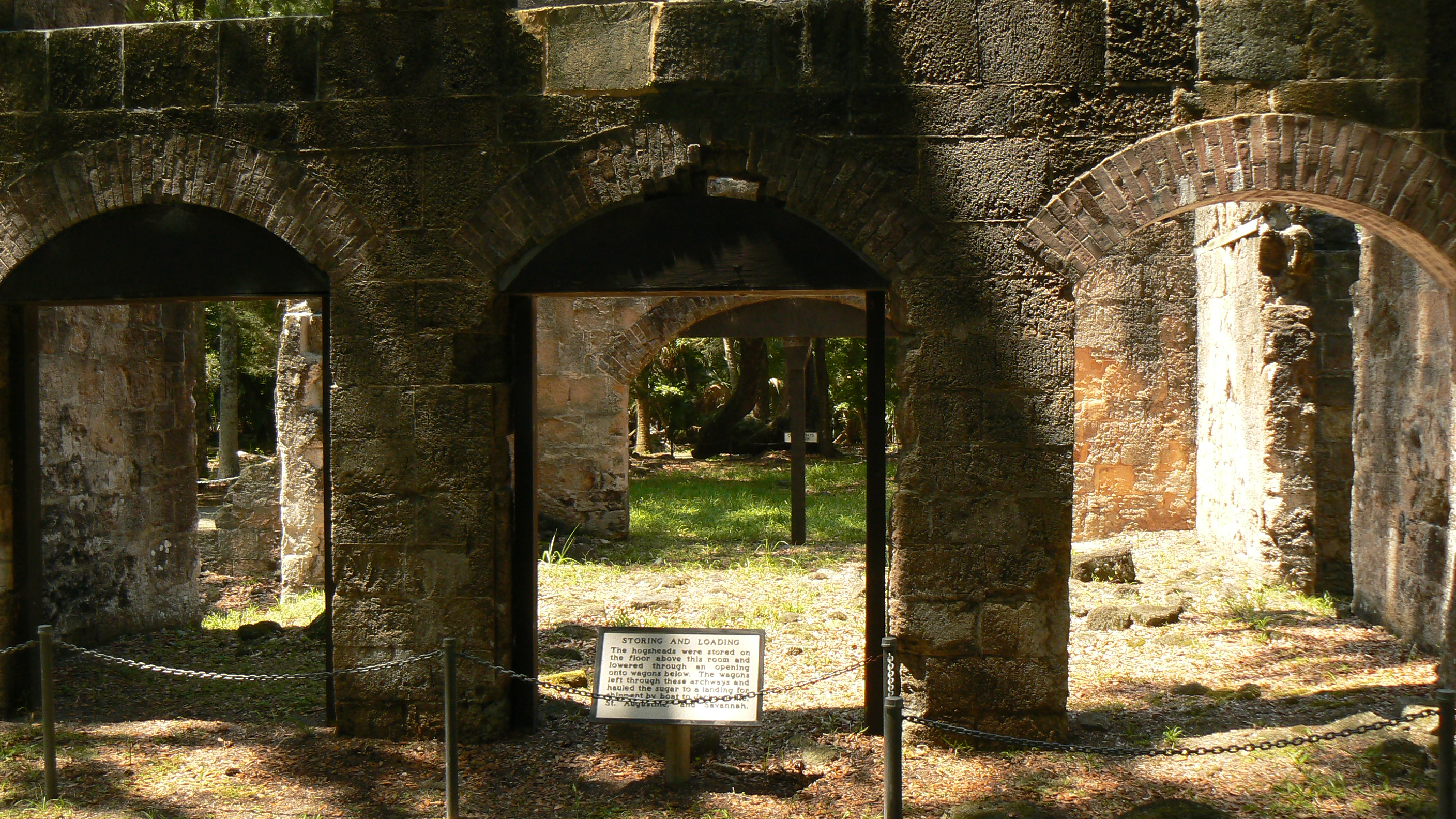

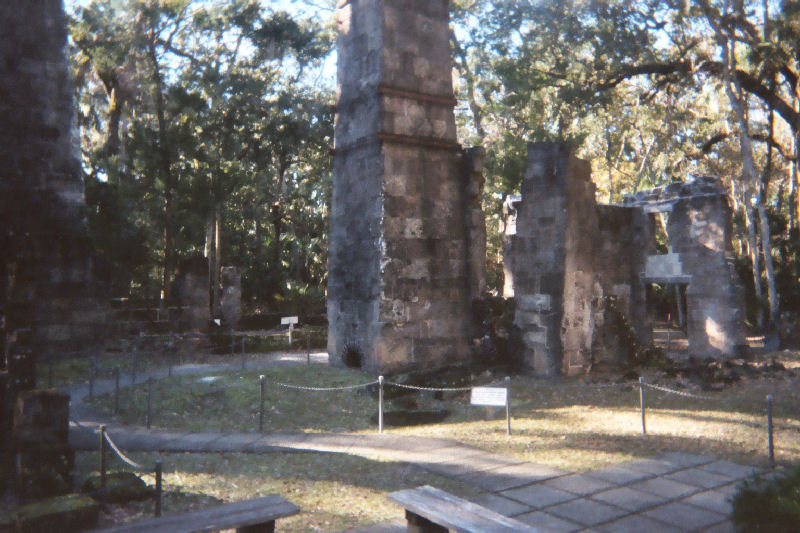

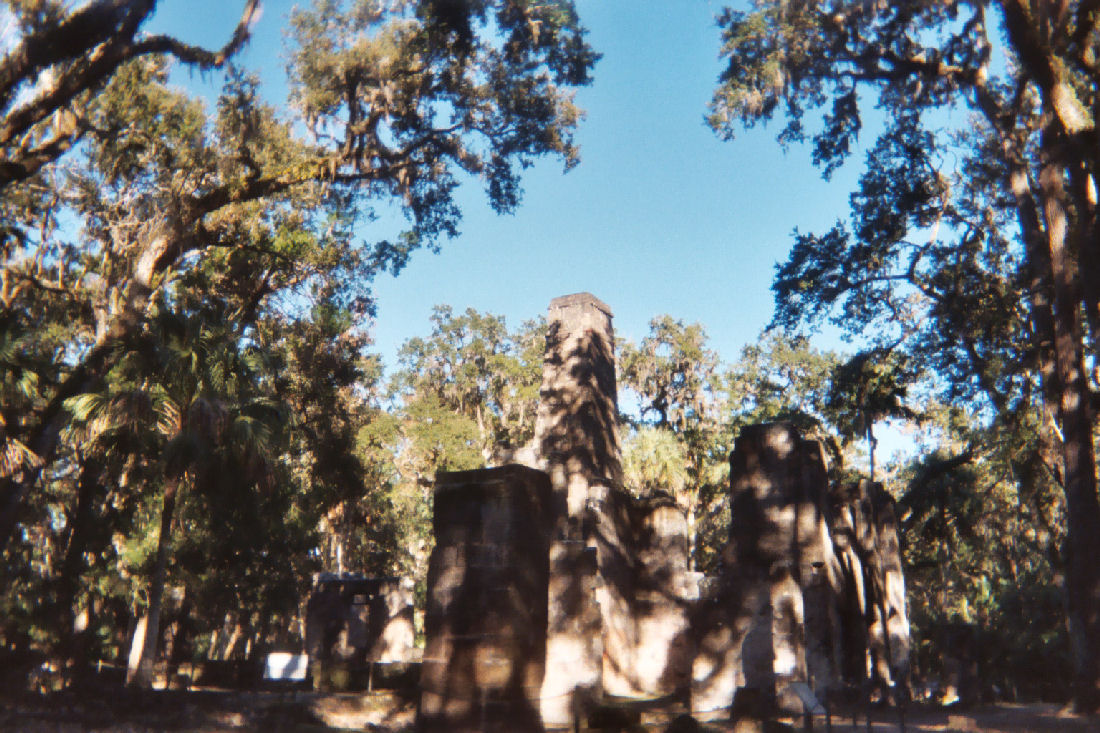

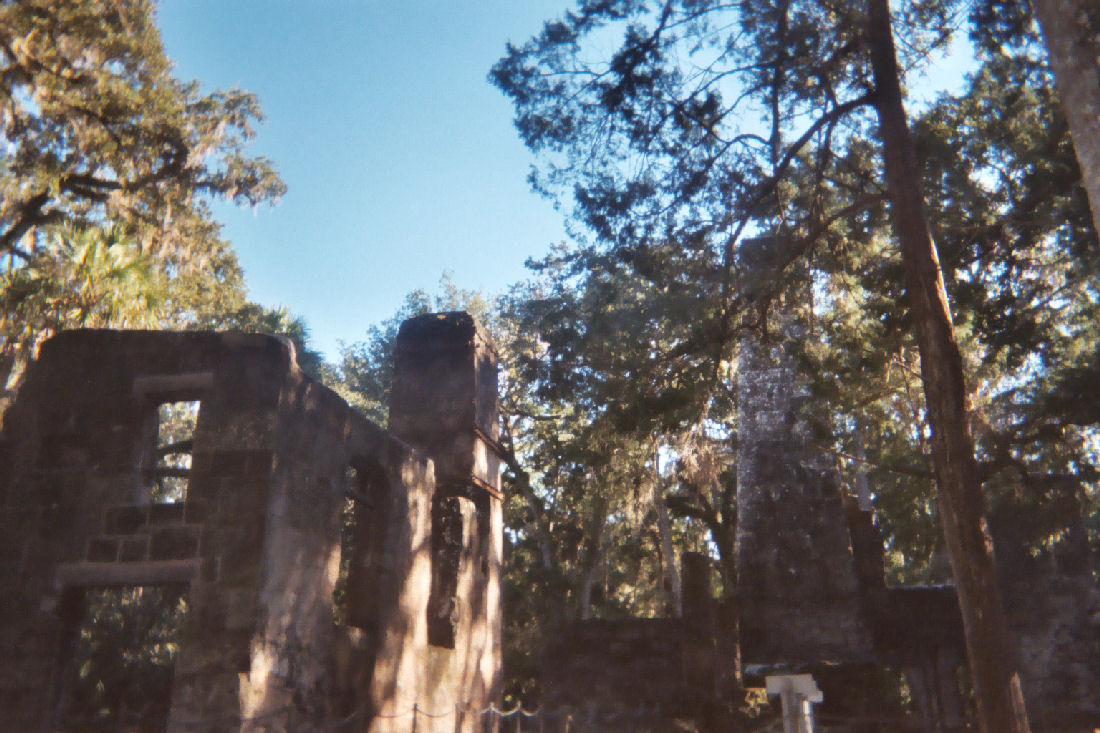
