= 2022 Americana Music Honors & Awards =

Americana Music Honors & Awards

- Date: September 14, 2022
- Location: Ryman Auditorium; Nashville, Tennessee

Highlights
- Most nominations: Brandi Carlile, Allison Russell and Yola (3)
- Website: americanamusic.org/awards

Television/radio coverage
- Network: Circle, PBS,

The 2022 Americana Music Honors & Awards ceremony was held on Wednesday, September 14, 2022, at Ryman Auditorium the in Nashville, Tennessee. The marquee event for the Americana Music Association, artists are awarded for outstanding achievements in the music industry.

== Performers ==
Artist(s)	Song(s)
Neal Francis	"You Can't Stop the Rain"
James McMurtry	"Canola Fields"
The Fairfield Four	"Rock My Soul"
Morgan Wade	"Run"
The War and Treaty	"That's How Love is Made"
Lukas Nelson	Tribute to Don Williams "Lord, I Hope This Day Is Good"
JP Harris	Tribute to Luke Bell "The Bullfighter"
Sierra Ferrell	"At the End of the Rainbow"
Lyle Lovett Chris Isaak	"We Gave Each Other COVID" "Somebody's Crying"
Adia Victoria	"Ain't Killed Me Yet"
Allison Russell Brandi Carlile	"You're Not Alone"
Lucinda Williams	"Can't Let Go"
Buddy Miller The McCrary Sisters	"Wide River to Cross"
Lyle Lovett Bill Payne	"Willin'"
Brandi Carlile Lucius	"You and Me on the Rock"
The Milk Carton Kids	"Something Fine"
Indigo Girls Brandi Carlile	"Galileo"
The McCrary Sisters	Tribute to Deborah McCrary "Amazing Grace"
The McCrary Sisters Sierra Ferrell Allison Russell Lucius JP Harris Neal Francis	"I'll Take You There

== Winners and nominees ==
The eligibility period for the 21st Americana Music Honors & Awards is April 1, 2021 to March 31, 2022. The nominees were announced on May 16, 2022 by The War and Treaty at the annual Nominations Ceremony, which was held at the National Museum of African American Music, which featured performances by Adia Victoria and Fisk Jubilee Singers and was livestreamed on Facebook. Winners in Bold.

Artist of the Year	Album of the Year
**Billy Strings**; Brandi Carlile; Jason Isbell; Allison Russell; Yola	**Outside Child - Allison Russell**; In These Silent Days - Brandi Carlile; Raise the Roof - Robert Plant and Alison Krauss; A Southern Gothic - Adia Victoria; Stand for Myself - Yola
Song of the Year	Emerging Act of the Year
**"Right on Time" - Brandi Carlile, Dave Cobb, Phil Hanseroth and Tim Hanseroth**; "Canola Fields" - James McMurtry; "Diamond Studded Shoes" - Dan Auerbach, Natalie Hemby, Aaron Lee Tasjan and Yola; "Juanita" - Sturgill Simpson; "Persephone" - Jeremy Lindsay and Allison Russell	**Sierra Ferrell**; Neal Francis; Brittney Spencer; Adia Victoria; Morgan Wade
Duo/Group of the Year	Instrumentalist of the Year
**The War and Treaty**; Big Thief; Los Lobos; The Mavericks; Robert Plant and Alison Krauss	**Larissa Maestro**; Ethan Ballinger; Brian Farrow; Shelby Means; Justin Moses

== Honors ==
The 2022 Lifetime Achievement honorees were announced on August 23, 2022.

=== Free Speech Award/Inspiration Award ===
- Indigo Girls

=== Legacy of Americana Award ===
- The Fairfield Four

=== Lifetime Achievement Award for Executive ===
- Al Bell

=== Lifetime Achievement Award for Performance ===
- Chris Isaak

=== President's Award ===
- Don Williams

=== Lifetime Achievement Award ===
- Buddy Miller

== Presenters ==
- The Milk Carton Kids
- Molly Tuttle
- Sarah Jarosz
- Shannon Sanders & Katie Rainge-Briggs
- Elizabeth Cook
- Buddy Miller
- Garth Fundis
- Lucius
- Nikki Lane
- Lyle Lovett
- Lukas Nelson
- Chris Cobb
- Jed Hilly
- Robert Plant
- Hayes Carll & Allison Moorer
- Michael T. Mauldin
- Ann Powers
- John Seigenthaler
- Brandi Carlile
- Jerry Douglas
