= Chorney =

Chorney is a surname. Notable people with the surname include:

- Linda Chorney (born 1960), American singer-songwriter
- Marc Chorney (born 1959), Canadian ice hockey player
- Michael Chorney, American musician
- Steven Chorney (born 1951), American artist, graphic designer and illustrator
- Taylor Chorney (born 1987), Canadian-born American ice hockey player
