= In These Silent Days =

2021 studio album by Brandi Carlile

Studio album by Brandi Carlile
- Released: October 1, 2021
- Studios: RCA Studio A (Nashville, Tennessee)
- Genres: Americana; country; folk; blues
- Length: 38:16
- Labels: Low Country Sound; Elektra
- Producers: Dave Cobb; Shooter Jennings

Brandi Carlile chronology
By the Way, I Forgive You (2018)	In These Silent Days (2021)	Who Believes in Angels? (2025)

Singles from In These Silent Days
- 1. "Right on Time" Released: July 21, 2021; 2. "You and Me on the Rock" Released: June 13, 2022

In These Silent Days is the seventh studio album by American singer and songwriter Brandi Carlile, released via Low Country Sound/Elektra Records on October 1, 2021. The album received critical acclaim, and the lead single "Right on Time" garnered Carlile three Grammy Award nominations in 2022, including Record of the Year and Song of the Year. The album earned Carlile seven more Grammy nominations in 2023, including Album of the Year and Best Americana Album (winning the latter), while the single "You and Me on the Rock" earned three nominations, including Record of the Year, and "Broken Horses" won two awards for Best Rock Performance and Best Rock Song.

The album debuted at No. 11 on the Billboard 200 and topped the Top Rock Albums and Americana/Folk Albums charts.

== Production ==
Carlile wrote the album's songs while quarantining during the early days of the COVID-19 pandemic. She penned "Throwing Good After Bad" before any of the other tracks. She wrote "You and Me on the Rock" for her wife. The album was produced by Dave Cobb and Shooter Jennings and was recorded at RCA Studio A in fall 2020.

== Critical reception ==
Professional ratings
Aggregate scores
Source	Rating
Metacritic	87/100
Review scores
Source	Rating
AllMusic	4.5/5 stars
American Songwriter	4.5/5 stars
Entertainment Weekly	A−
Paste	8.1/10
Uncut	7/10

Upon release, In These Silent Days received critical acclaim from critics. At Metacritic, which assigns a normalized rating out of 100 to reviews from mainstream critics, the album has an average score of 87 out of 100 out of eleven reviews, which indicates "universal acclaim".

Reviewing the album for AllMusic, Stephen Thomas Erlewine wrote that "What separates In These Silent Days from the rest of Carlile's albums is its controlled urgency and tight sense of craft, an aesthetic evident in how the album is as lean and robust as a well-loved record from the '70s." Writing for American Songwriter, Lee Zimmerman called the album "a crowning affair, one that’s destined to be considered a high point in Carlile’s ever-expansive career." and stated that "It’s little wonder then that In These Silent Days consistently speaks volumes." Concluding the review for Entertainment Weekly, Marc Hirsh claimed that "Seven albums in, Carlile has long since proven herself constitutionally incapable of making a bad record. She's not about to start now."

Concluding the review for Paste, Ben Salmon declared that "With her talent and charisma, and this group around her, it’s no wonder Carlile is the star she was always meant to be, and there’s certainly nothing about In These Silent Days that will stop her rise." The review for Uncut also highlighted the strength of Carlile's songwriting; "The songs are introspective, reflective and fretful. ... Its best moments are its quieter ones." Writing for Variety, Chris Willman stated "Carlile effortlessly glides between octaves while, somehow, still sounding completely conversational — the everyday diva we didn’t know we needed until she showed up at the door. Fans of the singer-songwriter sensibilities of the 1970s will especially find a lot to love in the rich variety of material in “In These Silent Days,” which, under the expert co-production of Dave Cobb and Shooter Jennings, certainly sounds analog-era, however it was recorded."

=== Accolades ===
Critics' rankings for In These Silent Days
Publication	Accolade	Rank	Ref.
Albumism	The 100 Best Albums of 2021	67	
AllMusic	The AllMusic 2021 Year in Review	—N/a	
Billboard	The 50 Best Albums of 2021: Staff List	23	
Double J	The 50 best albums of 2021	31	
Far Out Magazine	The 50 best albums of 2021	49	
Good Morning America	The 50 best albums of 2021	18	
PopMatters	The 75 best albums of 2021	18	
Rolling Stone	The 25 Best Country and Americana Albums of 2021	17	
Spin	The 30 Best Albums of 2021	8	
Stereogum	The 50 Best Albums of 2021	49	
Stereogum	The 10 Best Country Albums of 2021	2	
USA Today	10 best albums of 2021 – Melissa Ruggerigi	1	
Variety	The Best Albums of 2021	2	
The Young Folks	The 50 Best Albums of 2021	23	

A list of nominations for In These Silent Days
Year	Association	Category	Nominated work	Result	Ref.
2022	Americana Music Honors & Awards	Artist of the Year	Brandi Carlile	Nominated	
2022	Americana Music Honors & Awards	Album of the Year	In These Silent Days	Nominated	
2022	Americana Music Honors & Awards	Song of the Year	"Right on Time"	Won	
2022	UK Americana Awards	International Song of the Year	"Right on Time"	Won	
2022	Grammy Awards	Record of the Year	"Right on Time"	Nominated	
2022	Grammy Awards	Song of the Year	"Right on Time"	Nominated	
2022	Grammy Awards	Best Pop Solo Performance	"Right on Time"	Nominated	
2023	Grammy Awards	Album of the Year	In These Silent Days	Nominated	
2023	Grammy Awards	Best Americana Album	In These Silent Days	Won	
2023	Grammy Awards	Record of the Year	"You and Me on the Rock"	Nominated	
2023	Grammy Awards	Best Americana Performance	"You and Me on the Rock"	Nominated	
2023	Grammy Awards	Best American Roots Song	"You and Me on the Rock"	Nominated	
2023	Grammy Awards	Best Rock Performance	"Broken Horses"	Won	
2023	Grammy Awards	Best Rock Song	"Broken Horses"	Won	

== Track listing ==
All tracks are written by Brandi Carlile, Phil Hanseroth and Tim Hanseroth except "Right on Time", written by Carlile, Dave Cobb, Phil Hanseroth and Tim Hanseroth.

In These Silent Days track listing
No.	Title	Length
1.	"Right on Time"	3:05
2.	"You and Me on the Rock" (featuring Lucius)	3:50
3.	"This Time Tomorrow"	3:26
4.	"Broken Horses"	5:03
5.	"Letter to the Past"	3:40
6.	"Mama Werewolf"	3:41
7.	"When You're Wrong"	4:26
8.	"Stay Gentle"	2:28
9.	"Sinners, Saints and Fools"	4:32
10.	"Throwing Good After Bad"	4:07
Total length:		38:16

== Personnel ==
Musicians

- Brandi Carlile – vocals (all tracks), piano (1, 3, 5), guitar (2), acoustic guitar (4, 6, 8), Wurlitzer (5), electric guitar (9), string arrangement (9), synthesizer (10)
- Dave Cobb – acoustic guitar (1, 2, 5, 6, 8, 9)
- Phil Hanseroth – bass (1–10), percussion (5), vocals (3–6, 8, 9), string arrangement (9)
- Chris Powell – drums (1–9), percussion (2, 3)
- Tim Hanseroth – electric guitar (1, 4, 6, 8, 9), acoustic guitar (2, 3, 5, 6, 8), vocals (3–6, 8, 9), twelve-string guitar (4), string arrangement (9)
- Shooter Jennings – organ (1, 2), piano (2, 4–6, 8, 9), synthesizer (3, 6, 8), keyboards (5)
- Tom Elmhirst – programming (1, 2, 4–7, 10)
- Jess Wolfe – vocals, backing vocals (2)
- Holly Laessig – backing vocals (2)
- Josh Neumann – strings (9, 10)

Technical

- Dave Cobb – production (all tracks), mixing (3, 8)
- Shooter Jennings – production (all tracks), mixing (9)
- Tom Elmhirst – mixing (1, 2, 4–7, 10)
- Pete Lyman – mastering
- Brandon Bell – engineering
- Michael Harris – vocal engineering (2)
- Nathan Yaccino – additional engineering (9)
- Sean Quackenbush – additional engineering (9)
- David Spreng – additional recording (9)
- Matt Scatchell – mixing assistance (1, 2, 4–7, 10)
- Phillip Smith – engineering assistance

Artwork

- Catherine Carlile – creative direction
- Mat Maitland – design
- Neil Krug – digital imagery

== Charts ==
=== Weekly charts ===
Weekly chart performance for In These Silent Days
Chart (2021)	Peak position
Australian Hitseeker Albums (ARIA)	4
Austrian Albums (Ö3 Austria)	64
Canadian Albums (Billboard)	43
German Albums (Offizielle Top 100)	73
Scottish Albums (Official Charts)	21
Swiss Albums (Schweizer Hitparade)	12
UK Americana Albums (Official Charts)	3
UK Album Downloads (Official Charts)	14
US Billboard 200	11
US Americana/Folk Albums (Billboard)	1
US Top Rock Albums (Billboard)	1

=== Year-end charts ===
Year-end chart performance for In These Silent Days
Chart (2021)	Position
US Top Rock Albums (Billboard)	75

== In the Canyon Haze ==
In the Canyon Haze

Studio album (Reissue) by Brandi Carlile
- Released: September 28, 2022
- Labels: Low Country Sound; Elektra
- Producers: Brandi Carlile; Phil Hanseroth; Tim Hanseroth

Brandi Carlile chronology
In These Silent Days (2021)	In the Canyon Haze (2022)

Singles from In These Silent Days
- 1. "You and Me on the Rock (In the Canyon Haze)" Released: September 3, 2022

On September 28, 2022, In These Silent Days was re-issued with a bonus disc called In the Canyon Haze. The new album consists of acoustic re-recordings of the album's ten songs, followed by a cover of David Bowie's "Space Oddity". A limited edition vinyl for the album shipped on December 2, 2022. The re-recording of "You and Me on the Rock", featuring vocals from Carlile's wife Catherine, was released on September 3, 2022.

A concert film called Brandi Carlile: In the Canyon Haze — Live from Laurel Canyon was live-streamed on the same day directly to select IMAX theaters. The film was released on HBO and Max on July 1, 2023.

=== Track listing ===
All tracks are written by Brandi Carlile, Phil Hanseroth and Tim Hanseroth except where noted.

In the Canyon Haze track listing
No.	Title	Length
1.	"Right on Time" (written by Carlile, Dave Cobb, Phil Hanseroth and Tim Hanseroth)	3:08
2.	"You and Me on the Rock"	4:17
3.	"This Time Tomorrow"	3:47
4.	"Broken Horses"	5:55
5.	"Letter to the Past"	3:30
6.	"Mama Werewolf"	4:14
7.	"When You're Wrong"	5:42
8.	"Stay Gentle"	3:31
9.	"Sinners, Saints and Fools"	4:41
10.	"Throwing Good After Bad"	4:11
11.	"Space Oddity" (written by David Bowie)	5:00
Total length:		47:84
