= Grammy Award for Best American Roots Song =

Grammy award category established in 1958

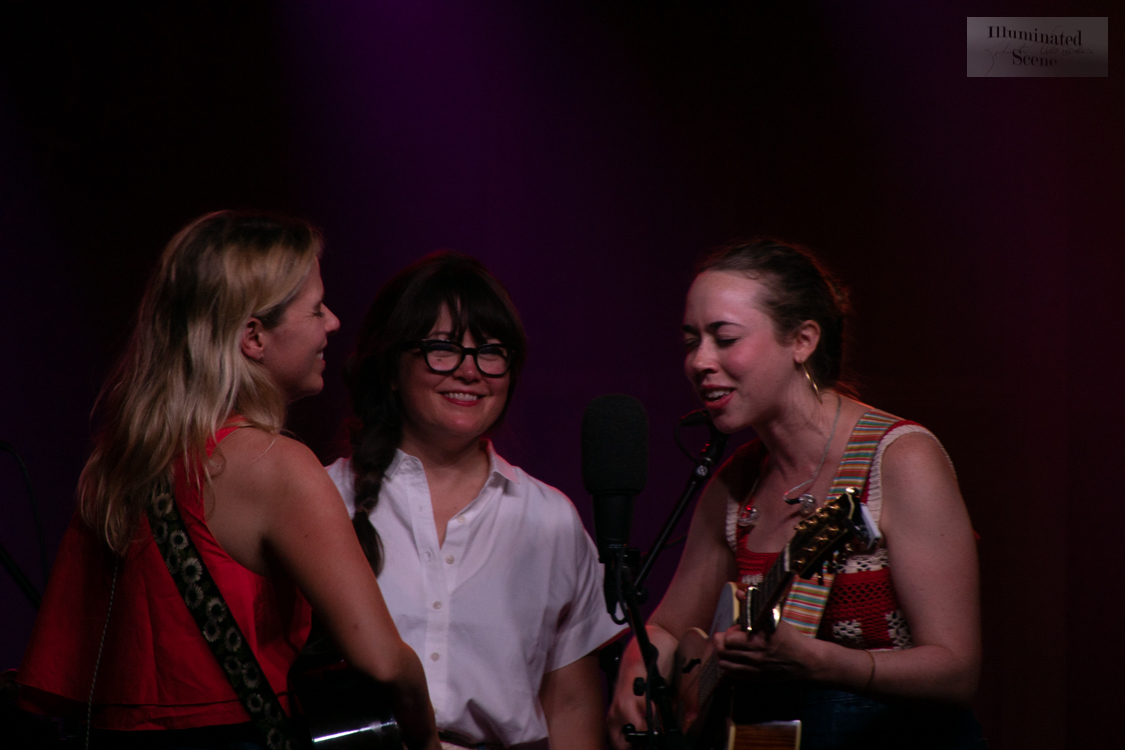
- "Ancient Light" by I'm with Her is the most recent recipient
- Awarded for: Quality songwriting in the American Roots subgenres (folk, bluegrass, regional roots music, etc.)
- Country: United States
- Presented by: National Academy of Recording Arts and Sciences
- First award: 2014
- Currently held by: Sarah Jarosz, Aoife O'Donovan & Sara Watkins – "Ancient Light" (2026)
- Website: grammy.com

The Grammy Award for Best American Roots Song is an award category at the annual Grammy Awards, a ceremony that was established in 1958 and originally called the Gramophone Awards, to recording artists for quality songs in the American Roots Music genres such as blues, bluegrass, folk, Americana, and regional roots music. Honors in several categories are presented at the ceremony annually by the National Academy of Recording Arts and Sciences of the United States to "honor artistic achievement, technical proficiency and overall excellence in the recording industry, without regard to album sales or chart position".

The award was first approved by the board of trustees of the Grammy Awards in Spring 2013.

As with all other songwriting awards at the Grammy's, the award for Best American Roots Song goes to the songwriters of the winning song, not to the artist(s) (except if the artist is also the songwriter).

The award was first presented at the 2014 Grammy Awards ceremony to Edie Brickell and Steve Martin, the songwriters of the awarded song. Jason Isbell is the only person who has won this award more than once, with three wins (as of 2024).

== Recipients ==
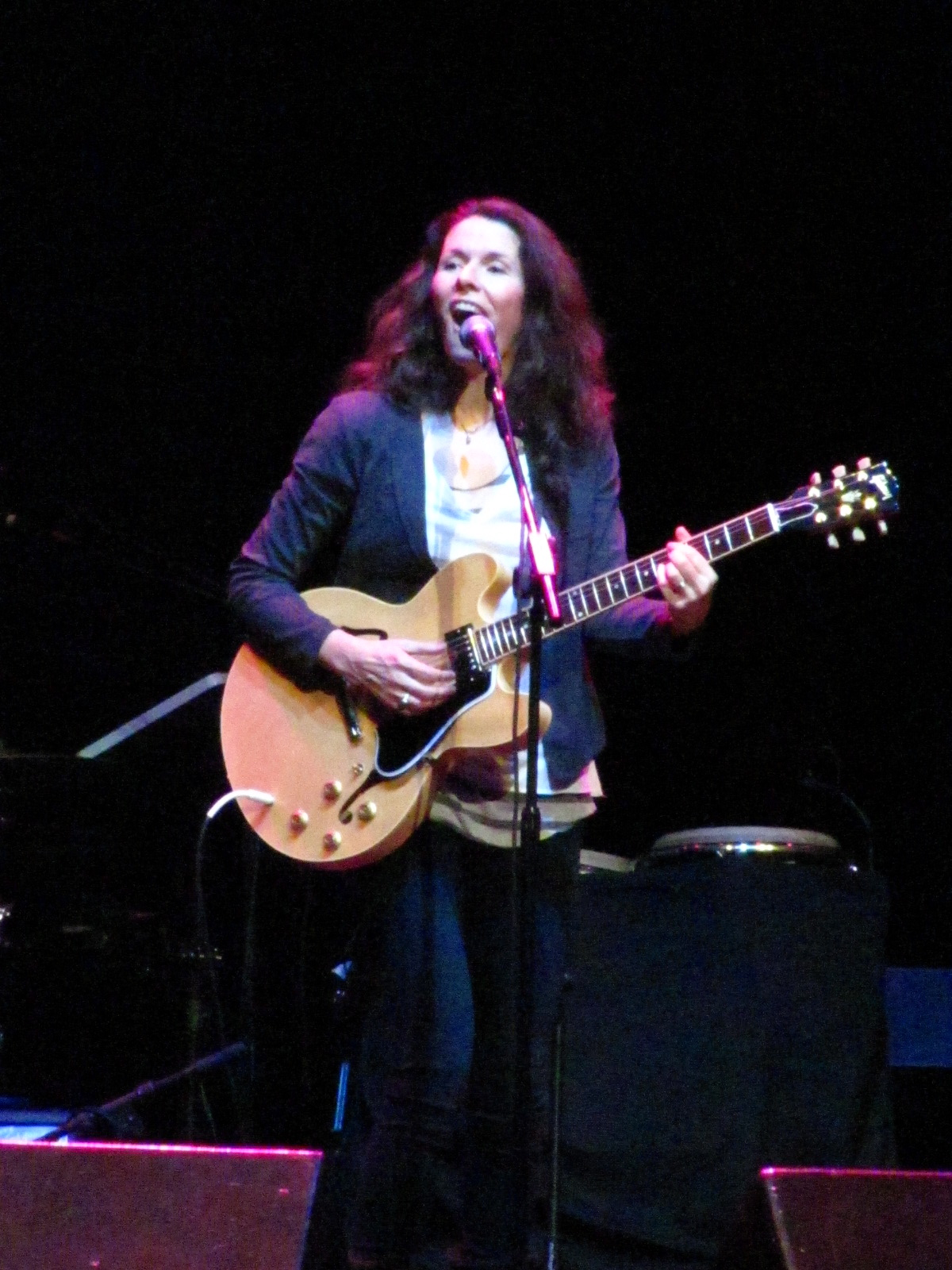
Edie Brickell received the inaugural award alongside collaborator Steve Martin.

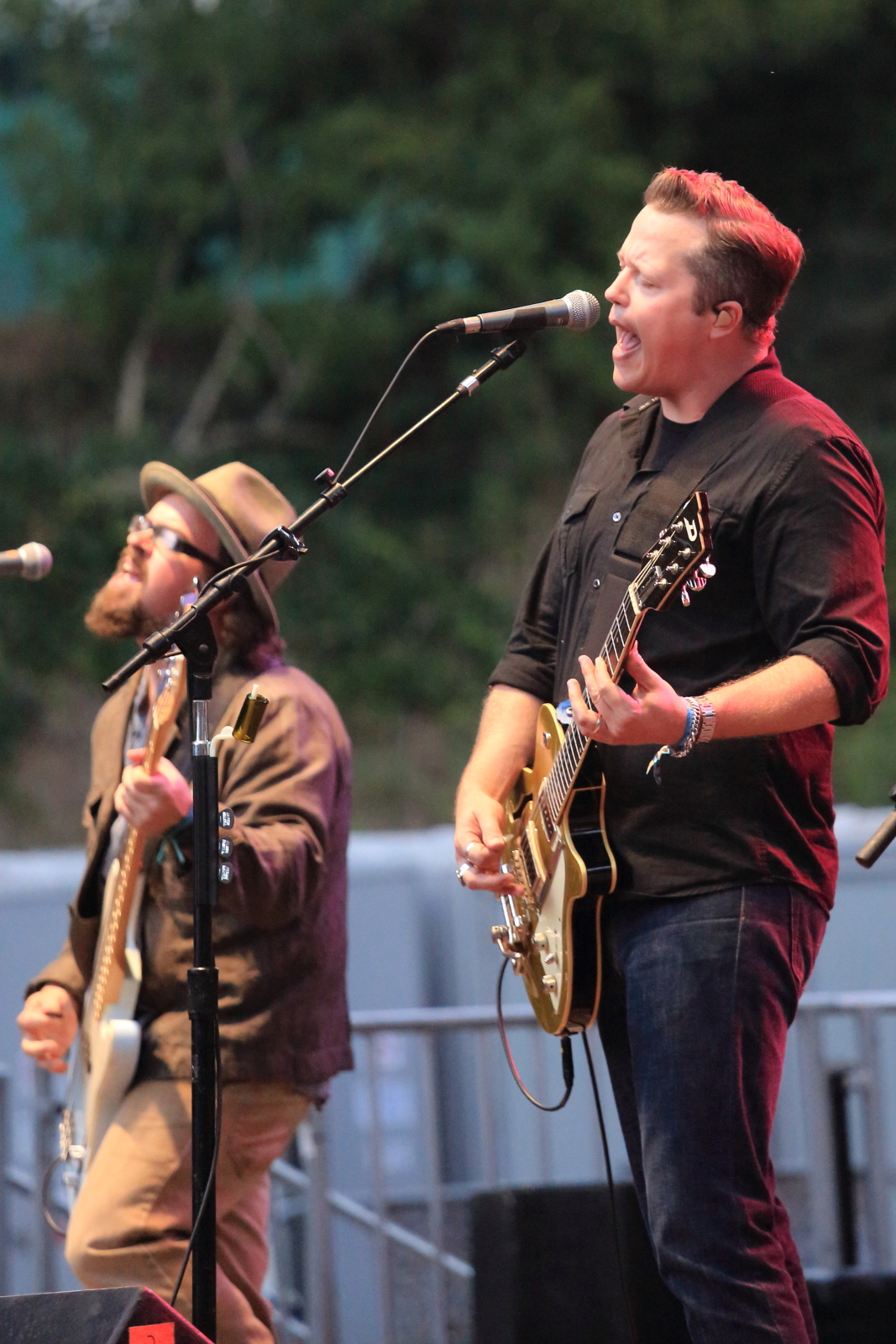
Jason Isbell (right) has received the award twice.

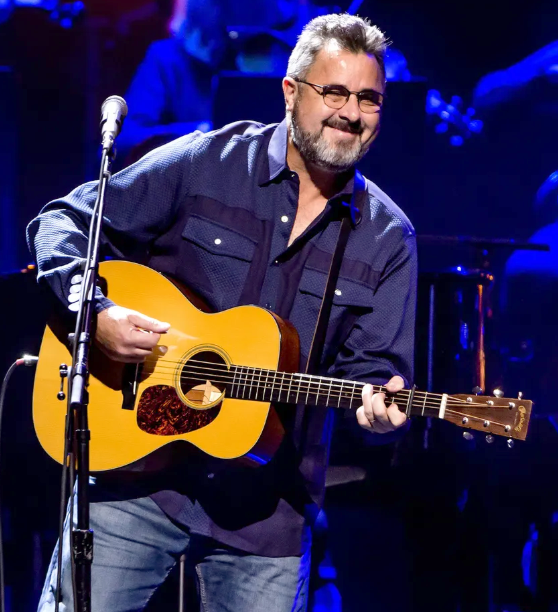
Vince Gill won the award in 2017.

=== 2010s ===
Year^{[I]}	Song	Songwriter(s)	Artist(s)
2014
2014	"Love Has Come for You"	Edie Brickell and Steve Martin	Steve Martin and Edie Brickell
2014	"Build Me Up from Bones"	Sarah Jarosz	Sarah Jarosz
2014	"Invisible"	Steve Earle	Steve Earle and the Dukes (and Duchesses)
2014	"Keep Your Dirty Lights On"	Tim O'Brien and Darrell Scott	Tim O'Brien and Darrell Scott
2014	"Shrimp Po-Boy, Dressed"	Allen Toussaint	Allen Toussaint
2015
2015	"A Feather's Not a Bird"	Rosanne Cash and John Leventhal	Rosanne Cash
2015	"Just So Much"	Jesse Winchester	Jesse Winchester
2015	"The New York Trains"	Woody Guthrie and Del McCoury	Del McCoury Band
2015	"Pretty Little One"	Edie Brickell and Steve Martin	Steve Martin and the Steep Canyon Rangers featuring Edie Brickell
2015	"Terms of My Surrender"	John Hiatt	John Hiatt
2016
2016	"24 Frames"	Jason Isbell	Jason Isbell
2016	"All Night Long"	Raul Malo	The Mavericks
2016	"The Cost of Living"	Don Henley and Stan Lynch	Don Henley and Merle Haggard
2016	"Julep"	Chris Eldridge, Paul Kowert, Noam Pikelny, Chris Thile and Gabe Witcher	Punch Brothers
2016	"The Traveling Kind"	Cory Chisel, Rodney Crowell and Emmylou Harris	Emmylou Harris and Rodney Crowell
2017
2017	"Kid Sister"	Vince Gill	The Time Jumpers
2017	"Alabama at Night"	Robbie Fulks	Robbie Fulks
2017	"City Lights"	Jack White	The White Stripes
2017	"Gulfstream"	Eric Adcock and Roddie Romero	Roddie Romero and the Hub City All-Stars
2017	"Wreck You"	Lori McKenna and Felix McTeigue	Lori McKenna
2018
2018	"If We Were Vampires"	Jason Isbell	Jason Isbell and the 400 Unit
2018	"Cumberland Gap"	David Rawlings and Gillian Welch	David Rawlings
2018	"I Wish You Well"	Raul Malo and Alan Miller	The Mavericks
2018	"It Ain't Over Yet"	Rodney Crowell	Rodney Crowell featuring Rosanne Cash and John Paul White
2018	"My Only True Friend"	Gregg Allman and Scott Sharrard	Gregg Allman
2019
2019	"The Joke"	Brandi Carlile, Dave Cobb, Phil and Tim Hanseroth	Brandi Carlile
2019	"All the Trouble"	Waylon Payne, Lee Ann Womack and Adam Wright	Lee Ann Womack
2019	"Build a Bridge"	Jeff Tweedy	Mavis Staples
2019	"Knockin' on Your Screen Door"	Pat McLaughlin and John Prine	John Prine
2019	"Summer's End"	Pat McLaughlin and John Prine	John Prine

=== 2020s ===
Year^{[I]}	Song	Songwriter(s)	Artist(s)
2020
2020	"Call My Name"	Sarah Jarosz, Aoife O'Donovan and Sara Watkins	I'm with Her
2020	"Black Myself"	Amythyst Kiah	Our Native Daughters
2020	"Crossing to Jerusalem"	Rosanne Cash and John Leventhal	Rosanne Cash
2020	"Faraway Look"	Dan Auerbach, Yola and Pat McLaughlin	Yola
2020	"I Don't Wanna Ride the Rails No More"	Vince Gill	Vince Gill
2021
2021	"I Remember Everything"	Pat McLaughlin and John Prine	John Prine (posthumous)
2021	"Cabin"	Laura Rogers and Lydia Rogers	The Secret Sisters
2021	"Ceiling to the Floor"	Sierra Hull and Kai Welch	Sierra Hull
2021	"Hometown"	Sarah Jarosz	Sarah Jarosz
2021	"Man Without a Soul"	Tom Overby and Lucinda Williams	Lucinda Williams
2022
2022	"Cry"	Jon Batiste and Steve McEwan	Jon Batiste
2022	"Avalon"	Rhiannon Giddens, Justin Robinson and Francesco Turrisi	Rhiannon Giddens and Francesco Turrisi
2022	"Bored"	Linda Chorney	Linda Chorney featuring Becca Byram, EJ Ouellette and Trevor Sewell
2022	"Call Me a Fool"	Valerie June	Valerie June featuring Carla Thomas
2022	"Diamond Studded Shoes"	Dan Auerbach, Natalie Hemby, Aaron Lee Tasjan and Yola	Yola
2022	"Nightflyer"	Jeremy Lindsay and Allison Russell	Allison Russell
2023
2023	"Just Like That"	Bonnie Raitt	Bonnie Raitt
2023	"Bright Star"	Anaïs Mitchell	Anaïs Mitchell
2023	"Forever"	Sheryl Crow and Jeff Trott	Sheryl Crow
2023	"High and Lonesome"	Robert Plant and T Bone Burnett	Robert Plant and Alison Krauss
2023	"Prodigal Daughter"	Tim O'Brien and Aoife O'Donovan	Aoife O'Donovan and Allison Russell
2023	"You and Me on the Rock"	Brandi Carlile, Phil and Tim Hanseroth	Brandi Carlile featuring Lucius
2024
2024	"Cast Iron Skillet"	Jason Isbell	Jason Isbell & the 400 Unit
2024	"Blank Page"	Michael Trotter Jr. and Tanya Trotter	The War and Treaty
2024	"California Sober"	Aaron Allen, William Apostol and Jon Weisberger	Billy Strings featuring Willie Nelson
2024	"Dear Insecurity"	Brandy Clark and Michael Pollack	Brandy Clark featuring Brandi Carlile
2024	"The Returner"	Drew Lindsay, JT Nero and Allison Russell	Allison Russell
2025
2025	"American Dreaming"	Sierra Ferrell and Melody Walker	Sierra Ferrell
2025	"Ahead of the Game"	Mark Knopfler	Mark Knopfler
2025	"All in Good Time"	Sam Beam	Iron & Wine featuring Fiona Apple
2025	"All My Friends"	Aoife O'Donovan	Aoife O'Donovan
2025	"Blame It on Eve"	John Hahn and Will Kimbrough	Shemekia Copeland
2026
2026	"Ancient Light"	Sarah Jarosz, Aoife O'Donovan and Sara Watkins	I'm with Her
2026	"Big Money"	Jon Batiste, Mike Elizondo and Steve McEwan	Jon Batiste
2026	"Foxes in the Snow"	Jason Isbell	Jason Isbell
2026	"Middle"	Jesse Welles	Jesse Welles
2026	"Spitfire"	Sierra Hull	Sierra Hull
2027	"Masks Off"	Jesse Welles	Jesse Welles
2027	"My Full Name"	Madison Cunningham	Madison Cunningham
2027	"Returning to Myself"	Brandi Carlile	Brandi Carlile
2027	"Tennessee Sunshine"	Mary Dawood Catlin, Todd Catlin and Grant Maloy Smith	Grant Maloy Smith
2027	"Waist Deep"	Zac Cockrell, Heath Fogg and Brittany Howard	Alabama Shakes

== Songwriters with multiple wins ==
3 wins

- Jason Isbell

== Songwriters with multiple nominations ==
4 nominations

- Jason Isbell
- Sarah Jarosz
- Pat McLaughlin
- Aoife O'Donovan

3 nominations

- Brandi Carlile
- John Prine

2 nominations

- Dan Auerbach
- Jon Batiste
- Edie Brickell
- Rosanne Cash
- Rodney Crowell
- Vince Gill
- Phil and Tim Hanseroth
- Sierra Hull
- John Leventhal
- Raul Malo
- Steve Martin
- Steve McEwan
- Tim O'Brien
- Allison Russell
- Sara Watkins
- Jesse Welles
- Yola

== See also ==
- List of Grammy Award categories
