= Phil and Tim Hanseroth =

Musicians who play with Brandi Carlile

The Hanseroth Twins
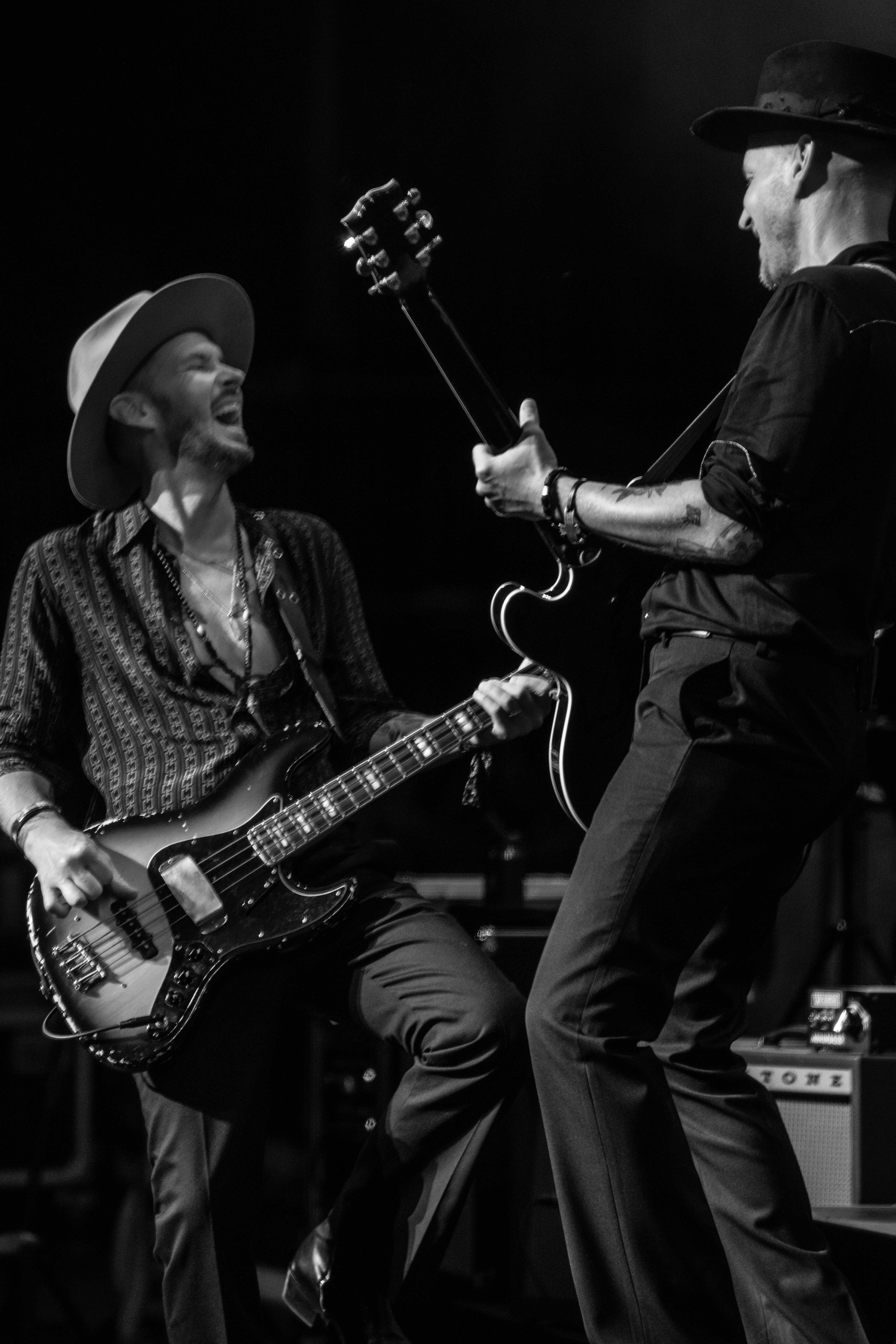
- The Hanseroths in 2023

Background information
- Origin: Seattle, Washington, U.S.
- Genres: Country; Americana; folk
- Instruments: Vocals; guitar
- Years active: 1990–present
- Label: Interscope
- Member of: Brandi Carlile Band
- Formerly of: Ohnalim; The Fighting Machinists
- Website: www.thehanserothtwins.com

The Hanseroth Twins is an American musical duo consisting of the identical twin brothers Phillip John Hanseroth and Timothy Jay Hanseroth, musicians, songwriters, and producers, who are best known for their work with Brandi Carlile.

== Biography ==
The duo has been writing and performing together since 1990. They began their music career as vocalists and guitarists in their first band, Ohnalim, prior to creating The Fighting Machinists with Miraslav Stephanov and Jim Whitney, and were signed to Interscope Records. After the members parted ways, the twins were introduced to local Seattle singer-songwriter Brandi Carlile by the producer Rick Parashar in 1999, and the trio would later form the Brandi Carlile Band.

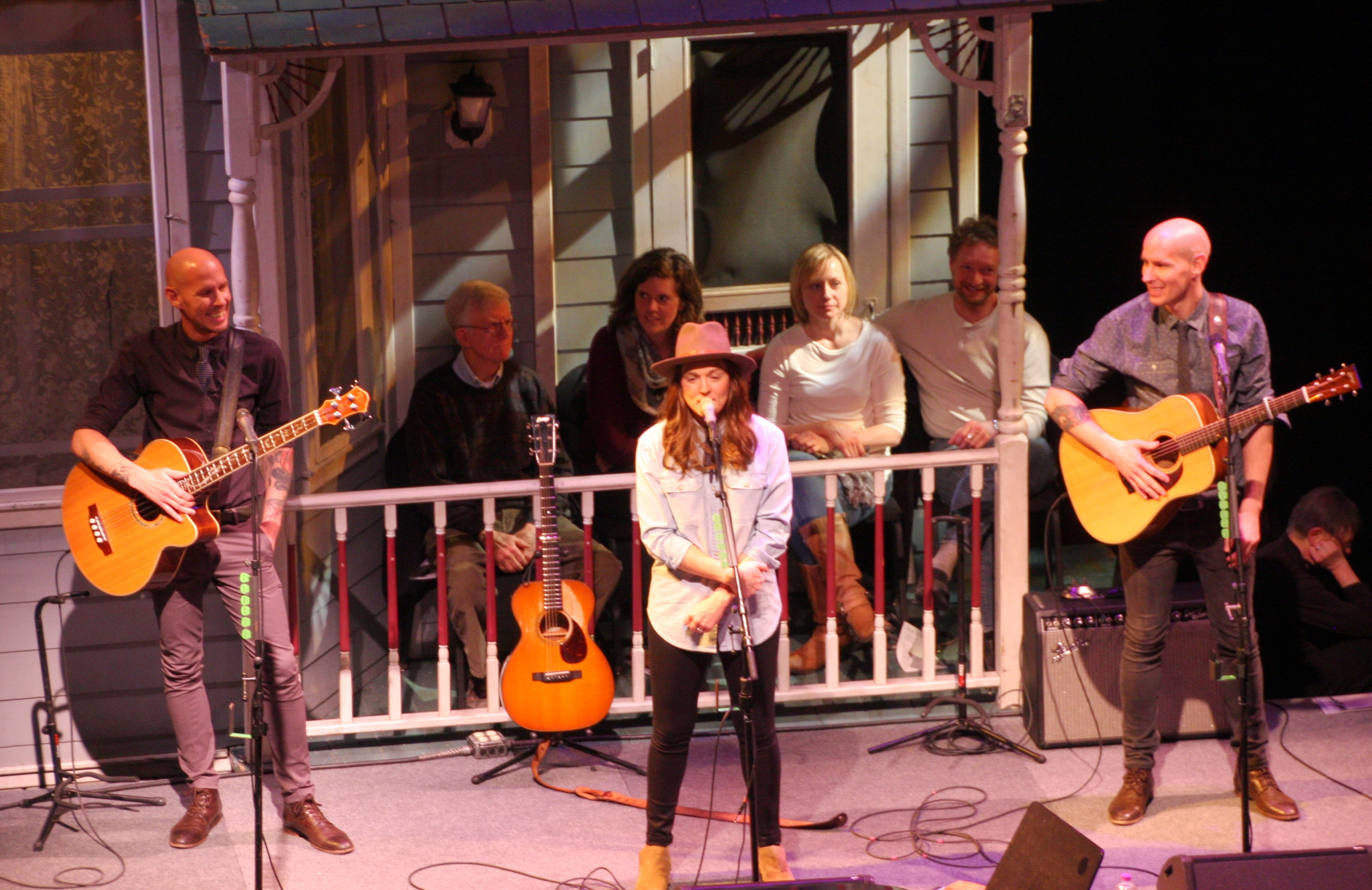
The Hanseroth Twins with Brandi Carlile at Fitzgerald Theater, Saint Paul, Minnesota, 2016

With Carlile, they have written many notable songs, including "The Joke", "The Story", and "The Eye". Their songs have been covered by artists such as Adele, Dolly Parton, and The Avett Brothers. They were a part of writing and recording supergroup, The Highwomen's, 2019 debut album, as well as Tanya Tucker’s 2019 and 2023 albums and wrote the score for Tucker's 2022 documentary, The Return of Tanya Tucker.

The duo performs live with Brandi Carlile regularly, and have performed at the Grammy Awards and on Saturday Night Live. Other work includes backing Joni Mitchell in the Joni Jams and with Kris Kristofferson.

Phil Hanseroth is married to Carlile's younger sister, Tiffany, also a singer; Tim Hanseroth's wife is photographer Hanna Hanseroth.

== Discography ==
=== Songwriting and production credits ===
| Year | Album | Artist | Song | Writers | Producers |
|---|---|---|---|---|---|
| 2024 | Vera | The Hanseroth Twins | Broken Homes | Phil Hanseroth, Tim Hanseroth | Phil Hanseroth, Tim Hanseroth |
| 2024 | Vera | The Hanseroth Twins | "Remember Me" | Phil Hanseroth, Tim Hanseroth | Phil Hanseroth, Tim Hanseroth |
| 2024 | Vera | The Hanseroth Twins | "If Everyone Had Someone" | Phil Hanseroth, Tim Hanseroth | Phil Hanseroth, Tim Hanseroth |
| 2024 | Vera | The Hanseroth Twins | "I'll Always Know I Do" | Phil Hanseroth, Tim Hanseroth | Phil Hanseroth, Tim Hanseroth |
| 2024 | Vera | The Hanseroth Twins | "Counting The Days" | Phil Hanseroth, Tim Hanseroth | Phil Hanseroth, Tim Hanseroth |
| 2024 | Vera | The Hanseroth Twins | "Under The Weather" | Phil Hanseroth, Tim Hanseroth | Phil Hanseroth, Tim Hanseroth |
| 2024 | Vera | The Hanseroth Twins | "The Poor Side of People" | Phil Hanseroth, Tim Hanseroth | Phil Hanseroth, Tim Hanseroth |
| 2024 | Vera | The Hanseroth Twins | "Somewhere Between" | Phil Hanseroth, Tim Hanseroth | Phil Hanseroth, Tim Hanseroth |
| 2024 | Vera | The Hanseroth Twins | "The Loyal Soldier" | Phil Hanseroth, Tim Hanseroth | Phil Hanseroth, Tim Hanseroth |
| 2024 | Vera | The Hanseroth Twins | "A Little Respect" | Vince Clarke and Andy Bell | Phil Hanseroth, Tim Hanseroth |
| 2023 | Sweet Western Sound | Tanya Tucker | "Kindness" | Phil Hanseroth, Tim Hanseroth | Brandi Carlile Shooter Jennings |
| 2023 | Sweet Western Sound | Tanya Tucker | "That Wasn't Me" | Brandi Carlile, Phil Hanseroth, Tim Hanseroth | Brandi Carlile Shooter Jennings |
| 2021 | In These Silent Days | Brandi Carlile | "Right on Time" | Brandi Carlile, Phil Hanseroth, Tim Hanseroth | Dave Cobb Shooter Jennings |
| 2021 | In These Silent Days | Brandi Carlile | "You and Me on the Rock" (feat. Lucius) | Brandi Carlile, Phil Hanseroth, Tim Hanseroth | Dave Cobb Shooter Jennings |
| 2021 | In These Silent Days | Brandi Carlile | "This Time Tomorrow" | Brandi Carlile, Phil Hanseroth, Tim Hanseroth | Dave Cobb Shooter Jennings |
| 2021 | In These Silent Days | Brandi Carlile | Broken Horses | Brandi Carlile, Phil Hanseroth, Tim Hanseroth | Dave Cobb Shooter Jennings |
| 2021 | In These Silent Days | Brandi Carlile | Letter to the Past | Brandi Carlile, Phil Hanseroth, Tim Hanseroth | Dave Cobb Shooter Jennings |
| 2021 | In These Silent Days | Brandi Carlile | Mama Werewolf | Brandi Carlile, Phil Hanseroth, Tim Hanseroth | Dave Cobb Shooter Jennings |
| 2021 | In These Silent Days | Brandi Carlile | When You're Wrong | Brandi Carlile, Phil Hanseroth, Tim Hanseroth | Dave Cobb Shooter Jennings |
| 2021 | In These Silent Days | Brandi Carlile | Stay Gentle | Brandi Carlile, Phil Hanseroth, Tim Hanseroth | Dave Cobb Shooter Jennings |
| 2021 | In These Silent Days | Brandi Carlile | Sinners, Saints and Fools | Brandi Carlile, Phil Hanseroth, Tim Hanseroth | Dave Cobb Shooter Jennings |
| 2021 | In These Silent Days | Brandi Carlile | Throwing Good After Bad | Brandi Carlile, Phil Hanseroth, Tim Hanseroth | Dave Cobb Shooter Jennings |
| 2020 | Saturn Return | The Secret Sisters | Silver | Laura Rogers, Lydia Rogers | Brandi Carlile, Phil Hanseroth, Tim Hanseroth |
| 2020 | Saturn Return | The Secret Sisters | "Late Bloomer" | Laura Rogers, Lydia Rogers | Brandi Carlile, Phil Hanseroth, Tim Hanseroth |
| 2020 | Saturn Return | The Secret Sisters | "Cabin" | Laura Rogers, Lydia Rogers | Brandi Carlile, Phil Hanseroth, Tim Hanseroth |
| 2020 | Saturn Return | The Secret Sisters | "Hand Over My Heart" | Laura Rogers, Lydia Rogers | Brandi Carlile, Phil Hanseroth, Tim Hanseroth |
| 2020 | Saturn Return | The Secret Sisters | "Fair" | Laura Rogers, Lydia Rogers | Brandi Carlile, Phil Hanseroth, Tim Hanseroth |
| 2020 | Saturn Return | The Secret Sisters | "Tin Can Angel" | Laura Rogers, Lydia Rogers | Brandi Carlile, Phil Hanseroth, Tim Hanseroth |
| 2020 | Saturn Return | The Secret Sisters | "Nowhere, Baby" | Laura Rogers, Lydia Rogers | Brandi Carlile, Phil Hanseroth, Tim Hanseroth |
| 2020 | Saturn Return | The Secret Sisters | "Hold You Dear" | Laura Rogers, Lydia Rogers | Brandi Carlile, Phil Hanseroth, Tim Hanseroth |
| 2020 | Saturn Return | The Secret Sisters | "Water Witch" | Laura Rogers, Lydia Rogers | Brandi Carlile, Phil Hanseroth, Tim Hanseroth |
| 2020 | Saturn Return | The Secret Sisters | "Healer In the Sky" | Laura Rogers, Lydia Rogers | Brandi Carlile, Phil Hanseroth, Tim Hanseroth |
| 2020 | Onward | Brandi Carlile | "Carried Me With You" | Brandi Carlile, Phil Hanseroth, Tim Hanseroth | Brandi Carlile, Phil Hanseroth, Tim Hanseroth |
| 2019 | The Highwomen | The Highwomen | "Wheels of Laredo" | Brandi Carlile, Phil Hanseroth, Tim Hanseroth | Dave Cobb |
| 2019 | While I'm Livin' | Tanya Tucker | "Mustang Ridge" | Brandi Carlile, Phil Hanseroth, Tim Hanseroth | Brandi Carlile, Shooter Jennings |
| 2019 | While I'm Livin' | Tanya Tucker | "The Wheels of Laredo" | Brandi Carlile, Phil Hanseroth, Tim Hanseroth | Brandi Carlile, Shooter Jennings |
| 2019 | While I'm Livin' | Tanya Tucker | "I Don't Owe You Anything" | Brandi Carlile, Phil Hanseroth, Tim Hanseroth | Brandi Carlile, Shooter Jennings |
| 2019 | While I'm Livin' | Tanya Tucker | "The Day My Heart Goes Still" | Brandi Carlile, Phil Hanseroth, Tim Hanseroth | Brandi Carlile, Shooter Jennings |
| 2019 | While I'm Livin' | Tanya Tucker | "Rich" | Brandi Carlile, Phil Hanseroth, Tim Hanseroth | Brandi Carlile, Shooter Jennings |
| 2019 | While I'm Livin' | Tanya Tucker | "Seminole Wind Calling" | Brandi Carlile, Phil Hanseroth, Tim Hanseroth | Brandi Carlile, Shooter Jennings |
| 2019 | While I'm Livin' | Tanya Tucker | "The Winner's Game" | Brandi Carlile, Phil Hanseroth, Tim Hanseroth | Brandi Carlile, Shooter Jennings |
| 2019 | While I'm Livin' | Tanya Tucker | "Bring My Flowers Now" | Brandi Carlile, Phil Hanseroth, Tim Hanseroth, Tanya Tucker | Brandi Carlile, Shooter Jennings |
| 2019 | The Owl | Zac Brown Band | "Leaving Love Behind" | Phil Hanseroth, Tim Hanseroth, Clay Cook, Coy Bowles, Jimmy De Martini, Zac Brown | Matt Mangano |
| 2018 | By The Way, I Forgive You | Brandi Carlile | "Every Time I Hear That Song" | Brandi Carlile, Phil Hanseroth, Tim Hanseroth | Dave Cobb, Shooter Jennings |
| 2018 | By The Way, I Forgive You | Brandi Carlile | "The Joke" | Brandi Carlile, Phil Hanseroth, Tim Hanseroth | Dave Cobb, Shooter Jennings |
| 2018 | By The Way, I Forgive You | Brandi Carlile | "Hold out Your Hand" | Brandi Carlile, Phil Hanseroth, Tim Hanseroth | Dave Cobb, Shooter Jennings |
| 2018 | By The Way, I Forgive You | Brandi Carlile | "The Mother" | Brandi Carlile, Phil Hanseroth, Tim Hanseroth | Dave Cobb, Shooter Jennings |
| 2018 | By The Way, I Forgive You | Brandi Carlile | "Whatever You Do" | Brandi Carlile, Phil Hanseroth, Tim Hanseroth | Dave Cobb, Shooter Jennings |
| 2018 | By The Way, I Forgive You | Brandi Carlile | "Fulton County Jane Doe" | Brandi Carlile, Phil Hanseroth, Tim Hanseroth | Dave Cobb, Shooter Jennings |
| 2018 | By The Way, I Forgive You | Brandi Carlile | "Sugartooth" | Brandi Carlile, Phil Hanseroth, Tim Hanseroth | Dave Cobb, Shooter Jennings |
| 2018 | By The Way, I Forgive You | Brandi Carlile | "Most of All" | Brandi Carlile, Phil Hanseroth, Tim Hanseroth | Dave Cobb, Shooter Jennings |
| 2018 | By The Way, I Forgive You | Brandi Carlile | "Harder to Forgive" | Brandi Carlile, Phil Hanseroth, Tim Hanseroth | Dave Cobb, Shooter Jennings |
| 2018 | By The Way, I Forgive You | Brandi Carlile | "Party of One" | Brandi Carlile, Phil Hanseroth, Tim Hanseroth | Dave Cobb, Shooter Jennings |
| 2017 | You Don't Own Me Anymore | The Secret Sisters | "Mississippi" | Laura Rogers, Lydia Rogers, Brandi Carlile, Phil Hanseroth, Tim Hanseroth | Brandi Carlile, Phil Hanseroth, Tim Hanseroth |
| 2017 | You Don't Own Me Anymore | The Secret Sisters | "King Cotton" | Laura Rogers, Lydia Rogers, Brandi Carlile, Phil Hanseroth, Tim Hanseroth | Brandi Carlile, Phil Hanseroth, Tim Hanseroth |
| 2017 | You Don't Own Me Anymore | The Secret Sisters | "Little Again" | Laura Rogers, Lydia Rogers, Brandi Carlile, Phil Hanseroth, Tim Hanseroth | Brandi Carlile, Phil Hanseroth, Tim Hanseroth |
| 2017 | Cover Stories | The Avett Brothers | "Have You Ever" | Phil Hanseroth | Brandi Carlile, Phil Hanseroth, Tim Hanseroth |
| 2017 | Cover Stories | Dolly Parton | "The Story" | Phil Hanseroth | Brandi Carlile, Phil Hanseroth, Tim Hanseroth |
| 2017 | Cover Stories | Anderson East | "Josephine" | Tim Hanseroth, Brandi Carlile | Brandi Carlile, Phil Hanseroth, Tim Hanseroth |
| 2017 | Cover Stories | Ruby Amanfu | "Shadow On the Wall" | Tim Hanseroth, Brandi Carlile | Brandi Carlile, Phil Hanseroth, Tim Hanseroth |
| 2017 | Cover Stories | The Secret Sisters | "Losing Heart" | Brandi Carlile, Phil Hanseroth, Tim Hanseroth | Brandi Carlile, Phil Hanseroth, Tim Hanseroth |
| 2015 | Firewatcher's Daughter | Brandi Carlile | "Wherever Is Your Heart" | Brandi Carlile, Tim Hanseroth | Brandi Carlile, Phil Hanseroth, Tim Hanseroth |
| 2015 | Firewatcher's Daughter | Brandi Carlile | "The Eye" | Brandi Carlile, Tim Hanseroth | Brandi Carlile, Phil Hanseroth, Tim Hanseroth |
| 2015 | Firewatcher's Daughter | Brandi Carlile | "Mainstream Kid" | Brandi Carlile, Tim Hanseroth | Brandi Carlile, Phil Hanseroth, Tim Hanseroth |
| 2015 | Firewatcher's Daughter | Brandi Carlile | "The Things I Regret" | Brandi Carlile, Phil Hanseroth, Tim Hanseroth | Brandi Carlile, Phil Hanseroth, Tim Hanseroth |
| 2015 | Firewatcher's Daughter | Brandi Carlile | "Beginning to Feel the Years" | Phil Hanseroth | Brandi Carlile, Phil Hanseroth, Tim Hanseroth |
| 2015 | Firewatcher's Daughter | Brandi Carlile | "Blood Muscle Skin & Bone" | Phil Hanseroth | Brandi Carlile, Phil Hanseroth, Tim Hanseroth |
| 2015 | Firewatcher's Daughter | Brandi Carlile | "Wilder (We're Chained)" | Tim Hanseroth | Brandi Carlile, Phil Hanseroth, Tim Hanseroth |
| 2015 | Firewatcher's Daughter | Brandi Carlile | "Alibi" | Tim Hanseroth | Brandi Carlile, Phil Hanseroth, Tim Hanseroth |
| 2014 | Put Your Needle Down | Secret Sisters | "Rattle My Bones" | Brandi Carlile, Phil Hanseroth, Tim Hanseroth | T Bone Burnett |
| 2012 | Bear Creek | Brandi Carlile | "Hard Way Home" | Brandi Carlile, Phil Hanseroth, Tim Hanseroth | Brandi Carlile, Phil Hanseroth, Tim Hanseroth |
| 2012 | Bear Creek | Brandi Carlile | "Raise Hell" | Brandi Carlile, Tim Hanseroth | Brandi Carlile, Phil Hanseroth, Tim Hanseroth |
| 2012 | Bear Creek | Brandi Carlile | "Save Part of Yourself" | Brandi Carlile, Tim Hanseroth | Brandi Carlile, Phil Hanseroth, Tim Hanseroth |
| 2012 | Bear Creek | Brandi Carlile | "Keep Your Heart Young" | Brandi Carlile, Tim Hanseroth | Brandi Carlile, Phil Hanseroth, Tim Hanseroth |
| 2012 | Bear Creek | Brandi Carlile | "In The Morrow" | Brandi Carlile, Tim Hanseroth | Brandi Carlile, Phil Hanseroth, Tim Hanseroth |
| 2012 | Bear Creek | Brandi Carlile | A Promise to Keep | Tim Hanseroth | Brandi Carlile, Phil Hanseroth, Tim Hanseroth |
| 2012 | Bear Creek | Brandi Carlile | 100 | Brandi Carlile, Phil Hanseroth | Brandi Carlile, Phil Hanseroth, Tim Hanseroth |
| 2012 | Bear Creek | Brandi Carlile | "I'll Still Be There" | Brandi Carlile, Phil Hanseroth | Brandi Carlile, Phil Hanseroth, Tim Hanseroth |
| 2012 | Bear Creek | Brandi Carlile | "What Did I Ever Come Here For" | Phil Hanseroth | Brandi Carlile, Phil Hanseroth, Tim Hanseroth |
| 2012 | Bear Creek | Brandi Carlile | "Rise Again" | Brandi Carlile, Phil Hanseroth, Tim Hanseroth | Brandi Carlile, Phil Hanseroth, Tim Hanseroth |
| 2010 | XOBC | Brandi Carlile | "Way To You" | Tim Hanseroth | |
| 2010 | XOBC | Brandi Carlile | "Us Again" | Brandi Carlile, Phil Hanseroth, Tim Hanseroth | |
| 2009 | Give Up The Ghost | Brandi Carlile | "Dying Day" | Tim Hanseroth | Rick Rubin |
| 2009 | Give Up The Ghost | Brandi Carlile | "Touching the Ground" | Tim Hanseroth | Rick Rubin |
| 2009 | Give Up The Ghost | Brandi Carlile | "Dreams" | Brandi Carlile, Phil Hanseroth, Tim Hanseroth | Rick Rubin |
| 2009 | Give Up The Ghost | Brandi Carlile | "Caroline" | Brandi Carlile, Phil Hanseroth, Tim Hanseroth | Rick Rubin |
| 2009 | Give Up The Ghost | Brandi Carlile | "Before it Breaks" | Brandi Carlile, Phil Hanseroth, Tim Hanseroth | Rick Rubin |
| 2009 | Give Up The Ghost | Brandi Carlile | "Oh Dear" | Brandi Carlile, Phil Hanseroth, Tim Hanseroth | Rick Rubin |
| 2009 | Give Up The Ghost | Brandi Carlile | "If There Was No You" | Brandi Carlile, Phil Hanseroth | Rick Rubin |
| 2007 | The Story | Brandi Carlile | "Have You Ever" | Phil Hanseroth | T Bone Burnett |
| 2007 | The Story | Brandi Carlile | "The Story" | Phil Hanseroth | T Bone Burnett |
| 2007 | The Story | Brandi Carlile | "Shadow on the Wall" | Brandi Carlile, Tim Hanseroth | T Bone Burnett |
| 2007 | The Story | Brandi Carlile | "Josephine" | Brandi Carlile, Tim Hanseroth | T Bone Burnett |
| 2007 | The Story | Brandi Carlile | "Hiding My Heart" | Tim Hanseroth | T Bone Burnett |
| 2007 | The Story | Brandi Carlile | "Losing Heart" | Brandi Carlile, Phil Hanseroth, Tim Hanseroth | T Bone Burnett |
| 2006 | (Single Only) | Brandi Carlile | "The Clock" - Live at Neumo's, Seattle WA - April 2005 | Brandi Carlile, Tim Hanseroth | |
| 2005 | Brandi Carlile | Brandi Carlile | "What Can I Say" | Tim Hanseroth | Brandi Carlile, Phil Hanseroth, Tim Hanseroth |
| 2005 | Brandi Carlile | Brandi Carlile | Throw It All Away | Brandi Carlile, Phil Hanseroth | Brandi Carlile, Phil Hanseroth, Tim Hanseroth |
| 2005 | Brandi Carlile | Brandi Carlile | Follow | Brandi Carlile, Tim Hanseroth | Brandi Carlile, Phil Hanseroth, Tim Hanseroth |
| 2005 | Brandi Carlile | Brandi Carlile | "Closer to You" | Brandi Carlile, Tim Hanseroth | Brandi Carlile, Phil Hanseroth, Tim Hanseroth |
| 2005 | Brandi Carlile | Brandi Carlile | "Someday Never Comes" | Brandi Carlile, Tim Hanseroth | Brandi Carlile, Phil Hanseroth, Tim Hanseroth |
| 2005 | Brandi Carlile | Brandi Carlile | "Fall Apart Again" | Brandi Carlile, Tim Hanseroth | Brandi Carlile, Phil Hanseroth, Tim Hanseroth |
| 2005 | Brandi Carlile | Brandi Carlile | "Gone" | Brandi Carlile, Phil Hanseroth, Tim Hanseroth | Brandi Carlile, Phil Hanseroth, Tim Hanseroth |

== Awards and nominations ==
Grammy Awards
| Year | Nominated work | Category | Result | Ref. |
|---|---|---|---|---|
| 2019 | By the Way, I Forgive You | Album of the Year | Nominated | |
| 2019 | "The Joke" | Song of the Year | Nominated | |
| 2019 | "The Joke" | Best American Roots Song | Won | |
| 2020 | "Bring My Flowers Now" | Song of the Year | Nominated | |
| 2020 | "Bring My Flowers Now" | Best Country Song | Won | |
| 2021 | "Carried Me with You" (from Onward) | Best Song Written for Visual Media | Nominated | |
| 2022 | "Right on Time" | Song of the Year | Nominated | |
| 2023 | In These Silent Days | Album of the Year | Nominated | |
| 2023 | "You and Me on the Rock" | Best American Roots Song | Nominated | |
| 2023 | "Broken Horses" | Best Rock Song | Won | |
