= You and Me on the Rock =

2022 single by Brandi Carlile and Lucius

Single by Brandi Carlile featuring Lucius

from the album In These Silent Days
- Released: June 13, 2022
- Studio: RCA Studio A (Nashville)
- Genre: Americana
- Length: 3:50
- Label: Low Country Sound; Elektra
- Songwriter(s): Brandi Carlile; Phil Hanseroth; Tim Hanseroth
- Producer(s): Dave Cobb; Shooter Jennings

Brandi Carlile singles chronology
"Dance Around It" (2022)	"You and Me on the Rock" (2022)

Lucius singles chronology
"Dance Around It" (2022)	"You and Me on the Rock" (2022)	"Love is the Disaster" (2022)

Music video
- "You and Me on the Rock" on YouTube

"You and Me on the Rock" is a song by American singer-songwriter Brandi Carlile featuring American indie pop band Lucius. It was released on June 13, 2022, as the second single of the former's seventh studio album In These Silent Days. The song received three Grammy Award nominations for Record of the Year, Best Americana Performance and Best American Roots Song at the 65th ceremony.

== Background and production ==
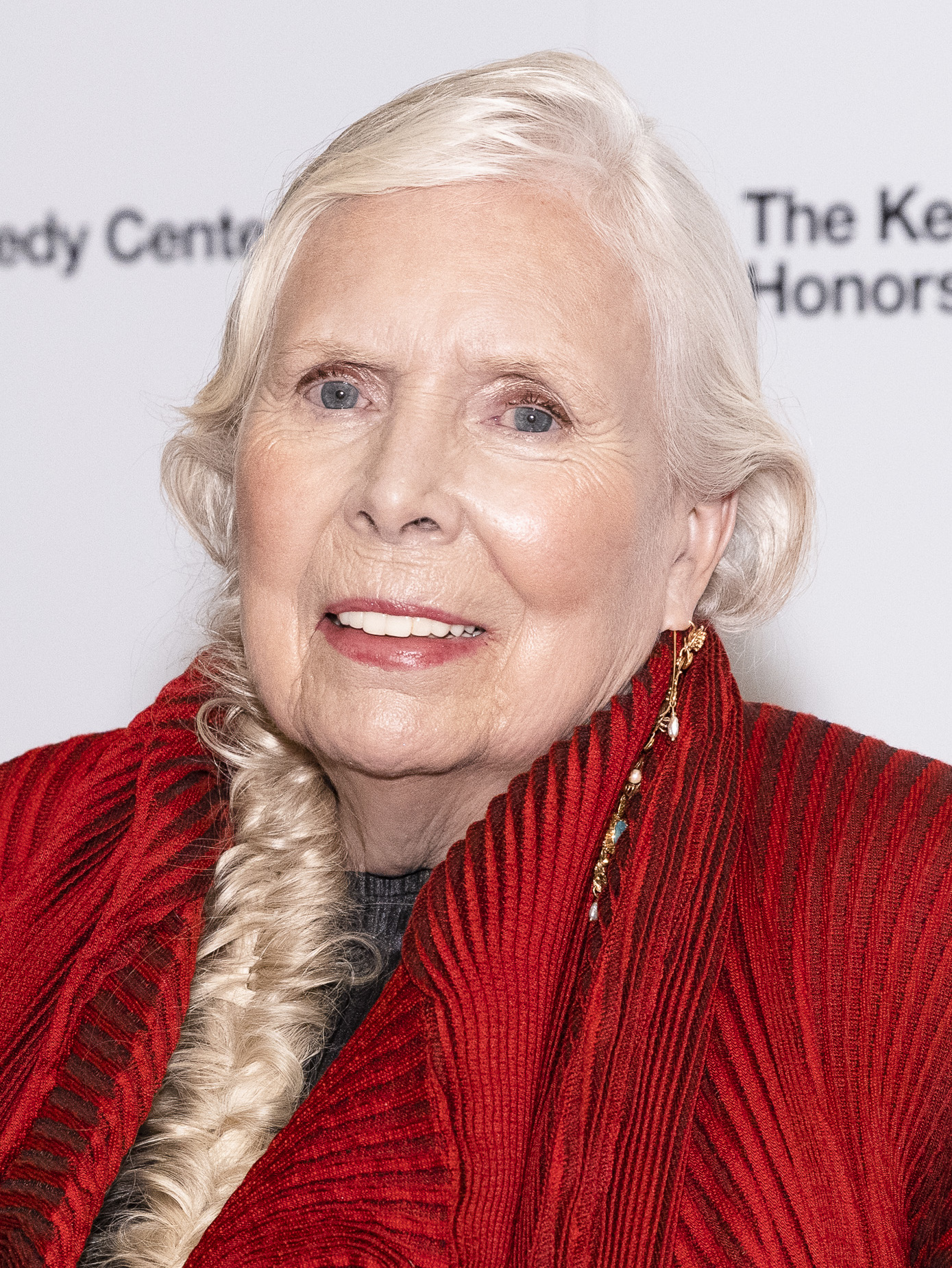
Carlile revealed that Joni Mitchell (pictured) had a direct influence on the song.

The song was written by Carlile with her long-time collaborators Phil and Tim Hanseroth. It features harmonies by indie pop band Lucius. According to Carlile, she originally sang the harmonies on the track until she overturned the decision. Then, she reached out to Lucius to replace her after producing their fourth studio album, Second Nature. She revealed to Variety that Canadian-American musician Joni Mitchell had a direct influence on the song. They initially wrote the demo on a dulcimer then sending it to producers Dave Cobb and Shooter Jennings. Jennings loved the version while Cobb deemed it "way too Joni [Mitchell-esque]". The three of them then compromised and worked on the song further and reached the final version.

Before her performance of the song at the Greek Theatre in Los Angeles in June 2022, she told the audience that the title was inspired from a song from her Bible camp when she was a kid which advised her to "build your house on a rock". She further explained during an interview with Stereogum a year prior that the song was written about her wife, Catherine and their kids being her "solid foundation" in her life.

== Reception ==
The track was met with positive reviews from critics. Ben Salmon of Paste praised the band performance and described the track as "an effusive love song that recalls the strummy rollercoaster folk-pop of Joni Mitchell". Chris Willman of Variety compared the track to Joni Mitchell's 1971 single "California" and Paul Simon's 1972 single "Me and Julio Down by the Schoolyard", while Stephen Thomas Erlewine of AllMusic described the song as an "explicit nod" to Mitchell's "Big Yellow Taxi".

Upon its album release, Carlile revealed to Variety that Joni Mitchell told her the track "sounded like a hit" and it was Harry Styles' favorite track of the album.

== Release ==
The "Laurel Canyon-inspired" version of the track, featuring Carlile's wife, Catherine, was released as the lead single of the reissue of its parent album, In the Canyon Haze on September 3, 2022.

== Live performances ==
Carlile with Lucius performed the track on The Ellen DeGeneres Show on October 28, 2021. Carlile performed it on The Daily Show with Trevor Noah on October 20, 2022 with her wife, Catherine; Saturday Night Live on December 10, 2022 with Lucius.

== Music video ==
The music video of the track was released on June 29, 2022 and directed by Drew Tyndell. The music video features Carlile performing the song while the animation of rock-solid home rises in the background.

== Personnel ==
- Brandi Carlile – vocals, guitar
- Lucius – featured artists, background vocals
- Dave Cobb – production, acoustic guitar
- Shooter Jennings – production
- Chris Powell – drums, percussion
- Phil Hanseroth – bass
- Tim Hanseroth – acoustic guitar
- Michael Harris – vocals engineering
- Brandon Bell – recording engineering
- Tom Elmhirst – mixing
- Matt Scatchell – mixing engineering assisting
- Pete Lyman – mastering

== Charts ==
Chart performance for "You and Me on the Rock"
Chart (2022)	Peak position
US Adult Alternative Airplay (Billboard)	19
