= Tom Elmhirst =

British mix engineer

Tom Elmhirst (born 8 June 1971) is a British mix engineer. He has worked with artists including Adele, Beck, David Bowie, Cage the Elephant, Lady Gaga, Residente, and Amy Winehouse, among many others. Elmhirst has received numerous accolades and nominations. He has won seventeen Grammy Awards, a Latin Grammy Award, a Primetime Emmy Award, and two Music Producers Guild Awards for Mix Engineer of the Year. Having won six trophies at the 2017 Grammy Awards, he set the record for the most Grammys won by an engineer or mixer in one night.

Tom Elmhirst is based in Dublin. He previously worked out of Electric Lady Studios in New York City, having started his career in London, UK.

== Awards and nominations ==
Award	Year	Work	Category	Result	Ref.
Grammy Awards	2008 (50th)	"Rehab"	Record of the Year	Won	
Grammy Awards	2008 (50th)	Back to Black	Album of the Year	Nominated	
Grammy Awards	2008 (50th)	Back to Black	Best Pop Vocal Album	Won	
Grammy Awards	2009 (51st)	"Chasing Pavements"	Record of the Year	Nominated	
Grammy Awards	2012 (54th)	"Rolling in the Deep"	Record of the Year	Won	
Grammy Awards	2012 (54th)	21	Album of the Year	Won	
Grammy Awards	2013 (55th)	"Lonely Boy"	Record of the Year	Nominated	
Grammy Awards	2013 (55th)	El Camino	Album of the Year	Nominated	
Grammy Awards	2015 (57th)	Morning Phase	Album of the Year	Won	
Grammy Awards	2015 (57th)	Morning Phase	Best Rock Album	Won	
Grammy Awards	2015 (57th)	Morning Phase	Best Engineered Album, Non-Classical	Won	
Grammy Awards	2017 (59th)	"Hello"	Record of the Year	Won	
Grammy Awards	2017 (59th)	25	Album of the Year	Won	
Grammy Awards	2017 (59th)	25	Best Pop Vocal Album	Won	
Grammy Awards	2017 (59th)	Blackstar	Best Alternative Music Album	Won	
Grammy Awards	2017 (59th)	Blackstar	Best Engineered Album, Non-Classical	Won	
Grammy Awards	2017 (59th)	Tell Me I'm Pretty	Best Rock Album	Won	
Grammy Awards	2018 (60th)	Residente	Best Latin Rock, Urban or Alternative Album	Won	
Grammy Awards	2019 (61st)	"The Joke"	Record of the Year	Nominated	
Grammy Awards	2019 (61st)	"Shallow"	Record of the Year	Nominated	
Grammy Awards	2020 (62nd)	Social Cues	Best Rock Album	Won	
Grammy Awards	2020 (62nd)	A Star Is Born	Best Compilation Soundtrack for Visual Media	Won	
Grammy Awards	2020 (62nd)	Scenery	Best Engineered Album, Non-Classical	Nominated	
Grammy Awards	2021 (63rd)	Women in Music Pt. III	Album of the Year	Nominated	
Grammy Awards	2022 (64th)	"Right on Time"	Record of the Year	Nominated	
Grammy Awards	2022 (64th)	Montero	Album of the Year	Nominated	
Grammy Awards	2022 (64th)	Dawn	Best Engineered Album, Non-Classical	Nominated	
Grammy Awards	2023 (65th)	"Easy on Me"	Record of the Year	Nominated	
Grammy Awards	2023 (65th)	"You and Me on the Rock"	Record of the Year	Nominated	
Grammy Awards	2023 (65th)	30	Album of the Year	Nominated	
Grammy Awards	2023 (65th)	In These Silent Days	Album of the Year	Nominated	
Latin Grammy Awards	2017 (18th)	"Guerra"	Record of the Year	Nominated	
Latin Grammy Awards	2017 (18th)	Residente	Album of the Year	Nominated	
Latin Grammy Awards	2017 (18th)	Residente	Best Urban Music Album	Won	
Music Producers Guild	2012 (4th)	Himself	Mix Engineer of the Year	Won	
Music Producers Guild	2017 (9th)	Himself	Mix Engineer of the Year	Won	
Primetime Emmy Awards	2022 (74th)	Adele One Night Only	Outstanding Sound Mixing for a Variety Series or Special	Won	

== Selected production credits ==
=== 1990s ===
- 1999: Sly - Gay Dad

=== 2000s ===
- 2003: Black Cherry - Goldfrapp
- 2003: Frank - Amy Winehouse
- 2004: Lifeblood - Manic Street Preachers
- 2005: Nightbird - Erasure
- 2006: The Warning - Hot Chip
- 2006: Alright, Still - Lily Allen
- 2006: These Streets - Paolo Nutini
- 2006: Back to Black - Amy Winehouse
- 2007: Version - Mark Ronson
- 2007: Overpowered - Róisín Murphy
- 2008: 19 - Adele
- 2008: Midnight Boom - The Kills
- 2009: The Performance - Shirley Bassey

=== 2010s ===
- 2010: The Sea - Corinne Bailey Rae
- 2011: 21 - Adele
- 2011: Ceremonials - Florence & The Machine
- 2011: El Camino - The Black Keys
- 2012: Our Version of Events - Emile Sande
- 2012: "Skyfall" (single) - Adele
- 2013: Sing to the Moon - Laura Mvula
- 2013: Halcyon Days - Ellie Goulding
- 2013: Reflektor - Arcade Fire
- 2014: Morning Phase - Beck
- 2015: Uptown Special - Mark Ronson
- 2015: Mr Wonderful - Action Bronson
- 2015: At. Long. Last - A$AP Rocky
- 2015: In Colour - Jamie xx
- 2015: Blood - Lianne La Havas
- 2015: 25 - Adele
- 2015: Tell Me I'm Pretty - Cage the Elephant
- 2016: Blackstar - David Bowie
- 2016: 32 Levels - Clams Casino
- 2016: Endless - Frank Ocean
- 2016: Blonde - Frank Ocean
- 2016: Joanne - Lady Gaga
- 2017: Residente - Residente
- 2017: Truth Is a Beautiful Thing - London Grammar
- 2017: Melodrama - Lorde
- 2017: Visions of a Life - Wolf Alice
- 2017: Masseduction - St. Vincent
- 2017: "The Joke" (single) - Brandi Carlile
- 2017: Rest - Charlotte Gainsbourg
- 2018: Electric Light - James Bay
- 2018: High as Hope - Florence and the Machine
- 2018: A Star Is Born - Lady Gaga & Bradley Cooper
- 2018: Delta - Mumford & Sons
- 2019: Scenery - Emily King
- 2019: To Believe - The Cinematic Orchestra
- 2019: Begin Again - Norah Jones
- 2019: Social Cues - Cage the Elephant
- 2019: Arizona Baby - Kevin Abstract
- 2019: Late Night Feelings - Mark Ronson
- 2019: III - Banks
- 2019: The Center Won't Hold - Sleater-Kinney
- 2019: GINGER - BROCKHAMPTON
- 2019: Why Me? Why Not. - Liam Gallagher

=== 2020s ===
- 2020: Women in Music Pt. III - HAIM
- 2020: What Could Possibly Go Wrong - Dominic Fike
- 2021: Californian Soil - London Grammar
- 2021: Path of Wellness - Sleater-Kinney
- 2021: In These Silent Days - Brandi Carlile
- 2021: 30 - Adele
- 2023: Barbie the Album - Various Artists
- 2023: Utopia - Travis Scott
