= Brandi Carlile =

American singer-songwriter (born 1981)

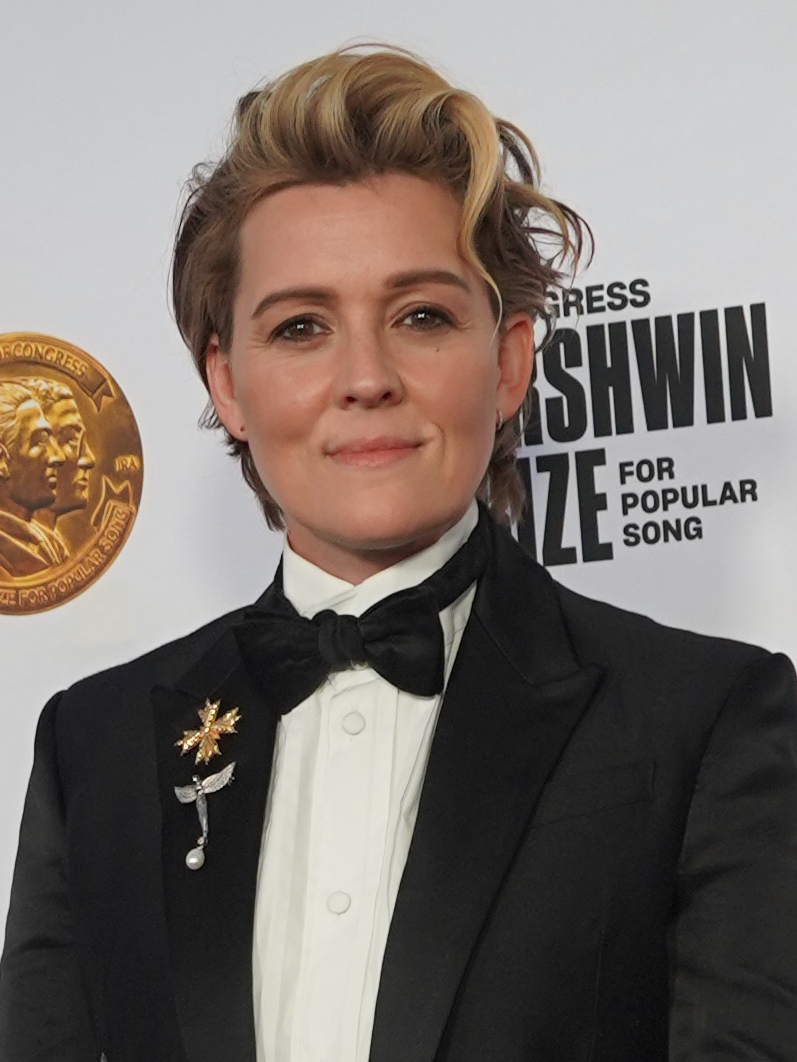
- Carlile in 2024

Background information
- Born: Brandi Marie Carlile; June 1, 1981 (age 45); Ravensdale, Washington, U.S.
- Genres: Americana; alternative country; rock; folk rock
- Occupations: Singer; songwriter; record producer; activist; author
- Instruments: Vocals; guitar; piano; banjo
- Years active: 2004–present
- Labels: Columbia; ATO; Low Country Sound; Interscope
- Spouse: Catherine Shepherd (m. 2012)
- Children: 2
- Member of: The Highwomen
- Website: brandicarlile.com

Brandi Marie Carlile (born June 1, 1981) is an American singer-songwriter and producer. Her music spans multiple genres, including folk rock, alternative country, Americana, and classic rock. During her career, she has received eleven Grammy Awards and two Emmy Awards, in addition to being nominated for an Academy Award. In 2026, she was named one of Time's Women of the Year.

As of 2025, Carlile has released eight studio albums. Her debut major label album, Brandi Carlile (2005), was released to critical acclaim. Carlile garnered wider recognition with her 2007 single "The Story" from her album of the same name. She later released Give Up the Ghost (2009), Bear Creek (2012), The Firewatcher's Daughter (2015), By the Way, I Forgive You (2018), In These Silent Days (2021), and Returning to Myself (2025).

Carlile has received three Grammy Awards for her work as a songwriter on Tanya Tucker's album While I'm Livin' (2019). She was the most nominated woman at the 61st Annual Grammy Awards, receiving six nominations, including nominations for Album of the Year (By the Way, I Forgive You), Record of the Year and Song of the Year ("The Joke"). In 2019, Carlile formed an all-female quartet called the Highwomen with Amanda Shires, Maren Morris, and Natalie Hemby. The Highwomen released their self-titled debut album in 2019 to critical acclaim and commercial success, winning the Grammy Award for Best Country Song for the track "Crowded Table" in 2021.

Carlile has received two Emmy Awards. In 2022, Carlile won her first Children's and Family Emmy Award for Outstanding Short Form Program for the TV series We the People. In 2023, she received her second Emmy for Outstanding Original Song for a Preschool Program for the YouTube series Jam Van. In 2025, Carlile received her first nomination for the Academy Award for Best Original Song for her writing and vocal contribution on "Never Too Late" with Elton John.

Carlile has been involved in activism and fundraising on various issues, including humanitarian aid, COVID-19 relief, racial justice, and LGBTQ rights.

== Early life ==
Brandi Marie Carlile was born on June 1, 1981, in Ravensdale, Washington, a small town 30 miles (50 kilometers) outside Seattle. Growing up in the only house for miles, Carlile played in the woods, built forts and played music with her brother Jay and sister Tiffany. When she was four, Carlile nearly died from bacterial meningitis. Her heart stopped several times and she was in a coma. Carlile spent her early life living in King County's southern cities of Black Diamond, Maple Valley and Auburn in Sumner, Washington and briefly lived in West Seattle.

Carlile began singing country songs on stage when she was eight years old. At age 8, she performed Johnny Cash's "Tennessee Flat Top Box" with her mother, Teresa Carlile, and began writing songs at age 15. At 16, she became a backup singer for an Elvis impersonator. According to Carlile, she was diagnosed with attention-deficit disorder as a teen. She attended Tahoma High School but later dropped out to pursue her musical career. After being introduced to the music of Elton John, Carlile taught herself to play piano and at 17 she learned to play the guitar.

== Career ==
=== 2004–2006: Career beginnings and debut ===
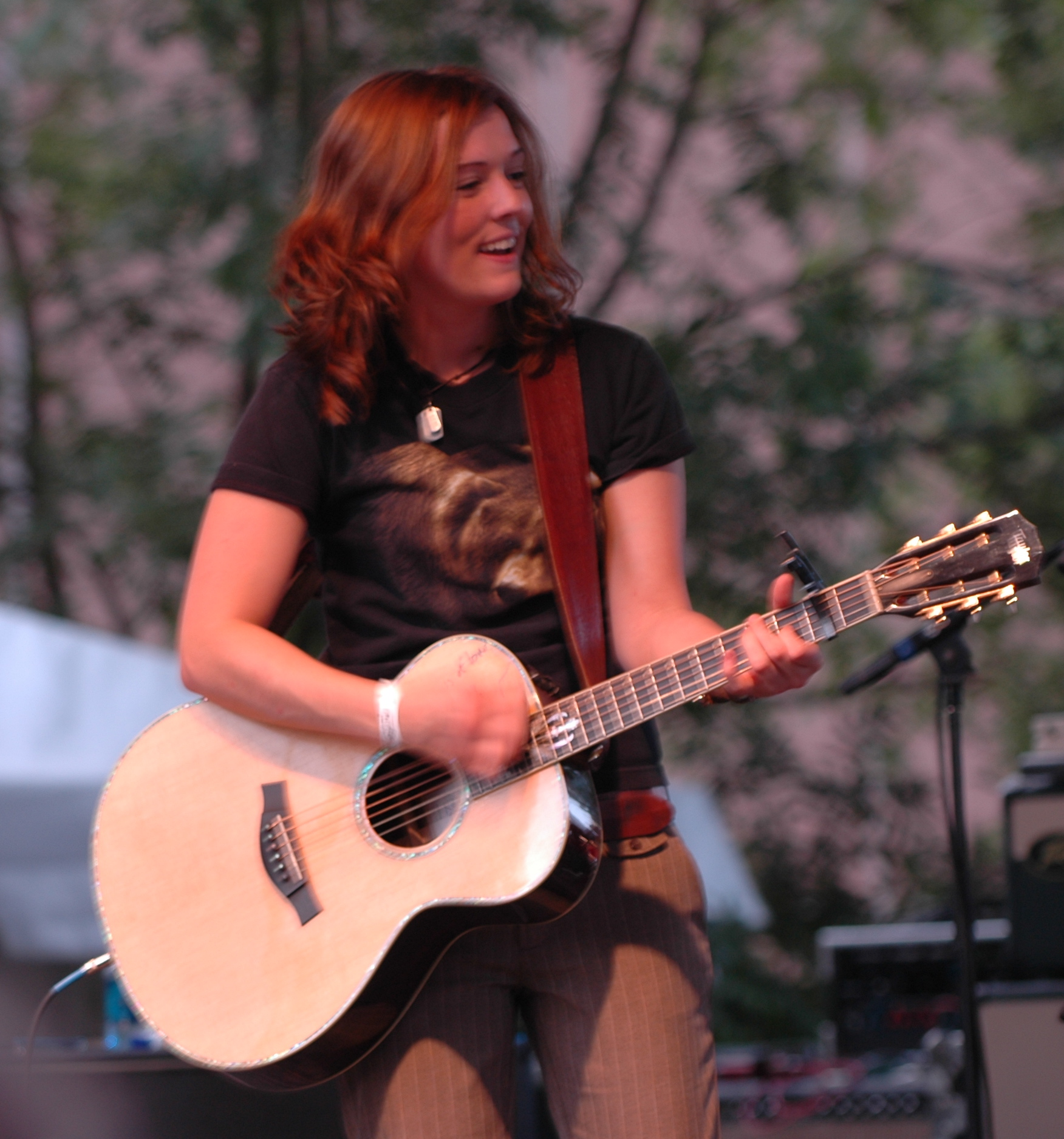
Carlile performing in Birmingham, Alabama in 2006

Carlile began her career performing in Seattle music clubs with twin brothers Phil and Tim Hanseroth. In the beginning, Columbia Records signed Carlile in 2004 on the strength of songs she had been recording at home. Released in 2005, Carlile showcased those early songs along with newly recorded tracks in the self-titled album Brandi Carlile. The 2006 re-release by Columbia Records included re-recordings of "Throw It All Away" and "What Can I Say".

The album earned enthusiastic reviews; she was featured on Rolling Stone's "10 Artists to Watch in 2005" list, and other "artist to watch" lists by Interview and Paste. In a review of the album, Stephen Thomas Erlewine wrote, "The accolades, combined with cover artwork that captures her at her cutest – as if she were a cousin of Rachael Leigh Cook – might make some listeners suspicious of Carlile, since the cumulative effect makes her seem like a pretty, prepackaged creation." He further wrote, "her music is ... rich, warm, and seductive, familiar in its form and sound, yet sounding fresh, even original, particularly in how her folky singer/songwriter foundation blends with her art-pop inclinations." The album peaked at No. 80 on the Billboard 200 and reached No. 1 on the US Folk Albums chart.

Shortly after the release of the album, she left her home in Seattle and set out to tour with the Hanseroth brothers. She had worked with them on her earliest recordings and independent regional tours. The tightly knit trio, which forms the core of her band today, spent the better part of two years on the road honing the songs that would later become part of her album The Story.

By the end of 2006, Carlile had embarked on several headlining tours and supported a variety of artists, including Ray LaMontagne, the Fray, Chris Isaak, Tori Amos, and Shawn Colvin.

=== 2007–2009: Breakthrough with The Story ===
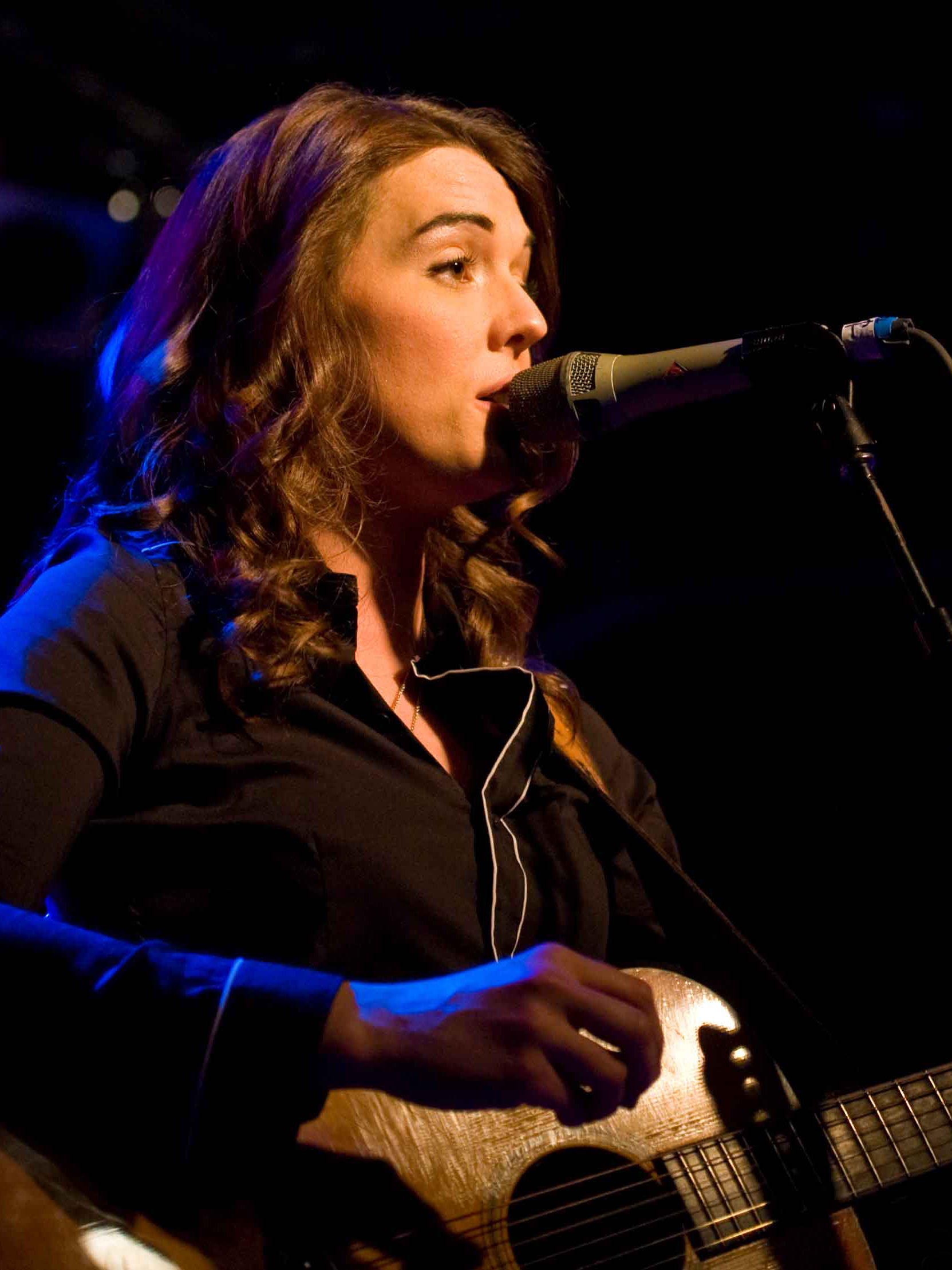
Carlile performing in Seattle, Washington in 2009

Carlile's second album, The Story, was produced by T Bone Burnett. It includes a collaboration with the Indigo Girls on "Cannonball". The album was recorded in an 11-day session with Carlile, the Hanseroths, and drummer Matt Chamberlain to capture the raw intensity of Carlile's live performances. The crack in Carlile's vocals during the title track, "The Story", came out by accident and was a direct result of the way the album was recorded. "The Story" was featured heavily in General Motors commercials during the 2008 Summer Olympics. Following the release of the commercials, album sales increased 368 percent from 1,323 to 6,198. Sales for the lead single, "The Story", increased in downloads of 28,091 copies. "The Story" peaked at No. 5 on the iTunes Music Store's most-purchased list. The song was also used in the 2008 commercial for Super Bock and helped the song reach No. 1 and the album reach No. 4 on the Portuguese charts. "The Story" was featured on the end credits of the romantic drama film The Lucky One. The album has sold more than 257,776 copies in the US and peaked at No. 41 on the Billboard 200 and No. 10 on the US Rock Albums chart.

"It wasn't until 2007's The Story, her T-Bone Burnett-produced sophomore release, that we realized even half of what we'd been dealt. Nearly a minute into the second song, something about her shifted from promise to absolute certainty as Carlile let loose a hurricane of lung power" wrote Rachael Maddux for Paste magazine. Music critic Stephen Thomas Erlewine praised Carlile for The Story, saying, "The roiling collection fulfills the promise of her remarkable debut, offering resounding confirmation that Carlile is a singular talent."

Three songs from Carlile's previous album, "Tragedy", "What Can I Say", and "Throw It All Away", were featured in the TV drama Grey's Anatomy. A special two-hour episode of Grey's Anatomy also featured Carlile's song "Turpentine" during footage of the spin-off, Private Practice. Grey's Anatomy also released a version of the music video for "The Story" with interspersed footage of the show. Actor Sara Ramirez performed their version of Carlile's single "The Story" in the musical episode of the show. In 2007, Carlile performed at the Borderline in London and as guest on Newton Faulkner's UK tour. She was the opening act for Maroon 5 and OneRepublic during their Australia tour. In April 2008, she performed on the BBC2 show Later... with Jools Holland.

Give Up the Ghost was released in 2009 and debuted at No. 26 on the Billboard 200. Produced by Grammy Award-winning producer Rick Rubin, it featured a collaboration with Elton John on the song "Caroline", as well as Amy Ray, drummer Chad Smith, and keyboardist Benmont Tench. In 2010, National Geographic Channel in Latin America chose the song "If There Was No You" from the album as a jingle to promote its series Grandes Migraciones (Great Migrations). Also that same year, during the 21st GLAAD Media Awards, Carlile was nominated for a GLAAD Media Award for "Outstanding Music Artist" for the album. The album peaked at No. 26 on the Billboard 200.

In one of the reviews of the album for Paste, Rachael Maddux wrote, "Writhing and burning and staring at life straight down the barrel, Give Up the Ghost is exactly the album Carlile needed to make at this moment. The production is thick but elegant, applied with full knowledge that the songs could exist beautifully in a sparse acoustic-strummed daze, but that they deserve more than that." She added, "The best part about Give Up the Ghost? She will probably make an even better album one day."

=== 2010–2014: Continued success ===
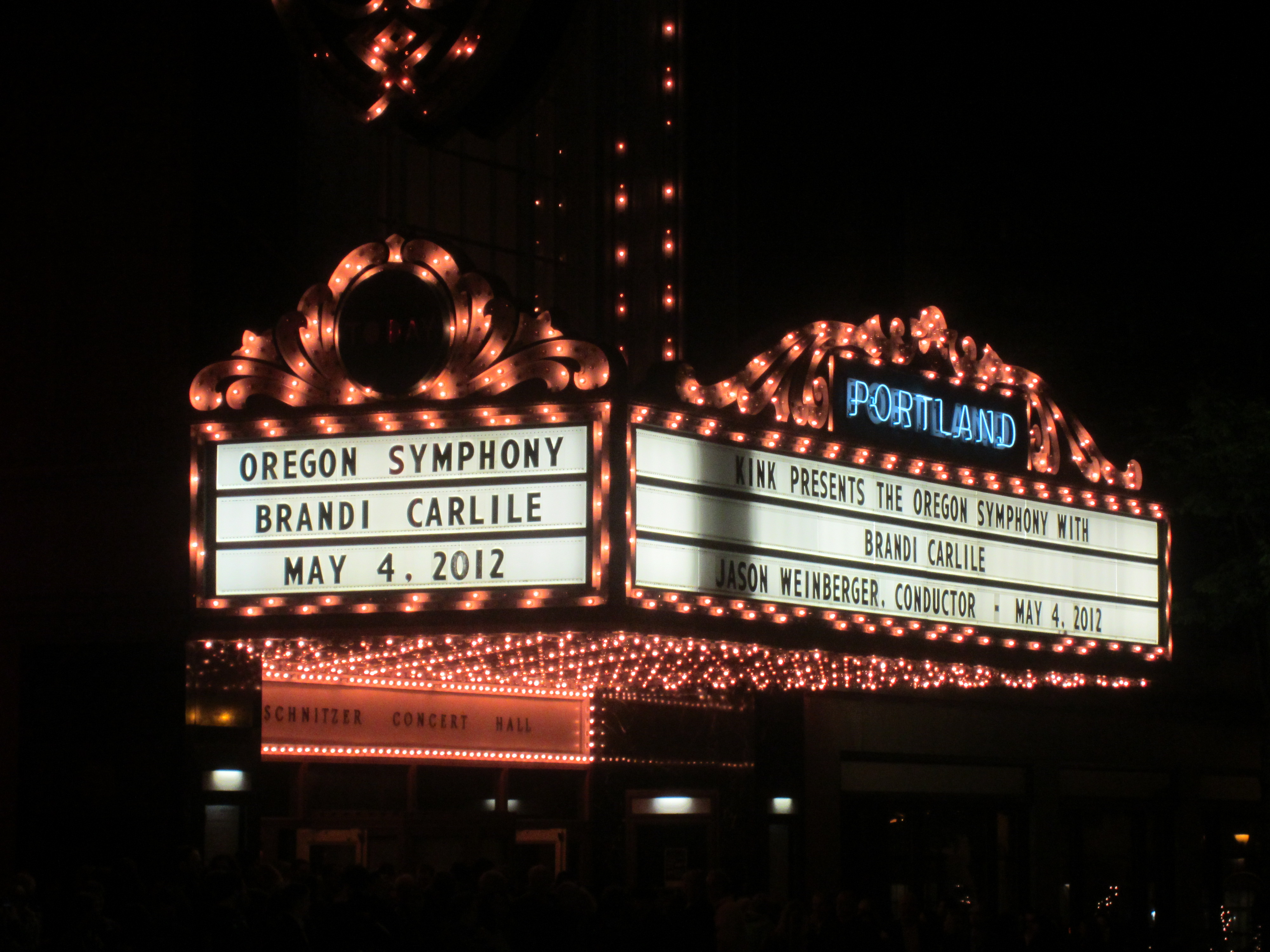
Carlile and the Oregon Symphony at the Arlene Schnitzer Concert Hall in Portland, Oregon in 2012

In 2011, Carlile's album Live at Benaroya Hall with the Seattle Symphony reached number 14 on the Top Rock Albums chart. The live album found Carlile performing a mix of original songs and cover material. Recorded during two sold-out shows in November 2010 at Benaroya Hall in Seattle, Washington, the album featured Washington-native Carlile and her long-time band (including brothers Phil and Tim Hanseroth) performing alongside the Seattle Symphony. Andrew Leahey from AllMusic called it Carlile's best and wrote, "'Live at Benaroya Hall' is more concerned with dressing up Carlile's music in elegant, orchestral clothing, and the results are pretty stunning, from the grandeur of 'The Story' – now featuring horns, woodwinds, and strings. This isn't Brandi Carlile's first concert album, but it's certainly the best." In the United States, the album reached peak positions of number 63 on the Billboard 200, number 5 on the US Folk Albums chart and number 14 on the US Rock Albums chart.

Carlile's next album, Bear Creek, released June 5, 2012, was produced by Trina Shoemaker. The album was a collaboration between her and the Hanseroth twins. In an interview with American Songwriter she said, "We decided a decade ago to split everything in our band evenly amongst the three of us. So nobody has any vested interest in getting involved with someone else's song or their story. But nobody has a vested interest in keeping someone out of the story either. It always comes down to what's best for the song." "Heart's Content" from this album was further featured in 2013's romantic movie Safe Haven, when Katie (played by Julianne Hough) and Alex (played by Josh Duhamel) heard it on radio in an empty diner and danced to it. The album peaked at No. 10 on the Billboard 200, No. 1 on the US Billboard Folk Albums, and No. 3 on the US Billboard Rock Albums chart. Carlile was also a judge for the 10th annual Independent Music Awards to support independent artists' careers.

On January 11, 2014, Carlile sang the national anthem for the Saints vs. Seahawks NFL playoff game. She recorded a cover of Fleetwood Mac's "The Chain" for the compilation album Sweetheart 2014.

=== 2015–2016: The Firewatcher's Daughter and Grammy nomination ===
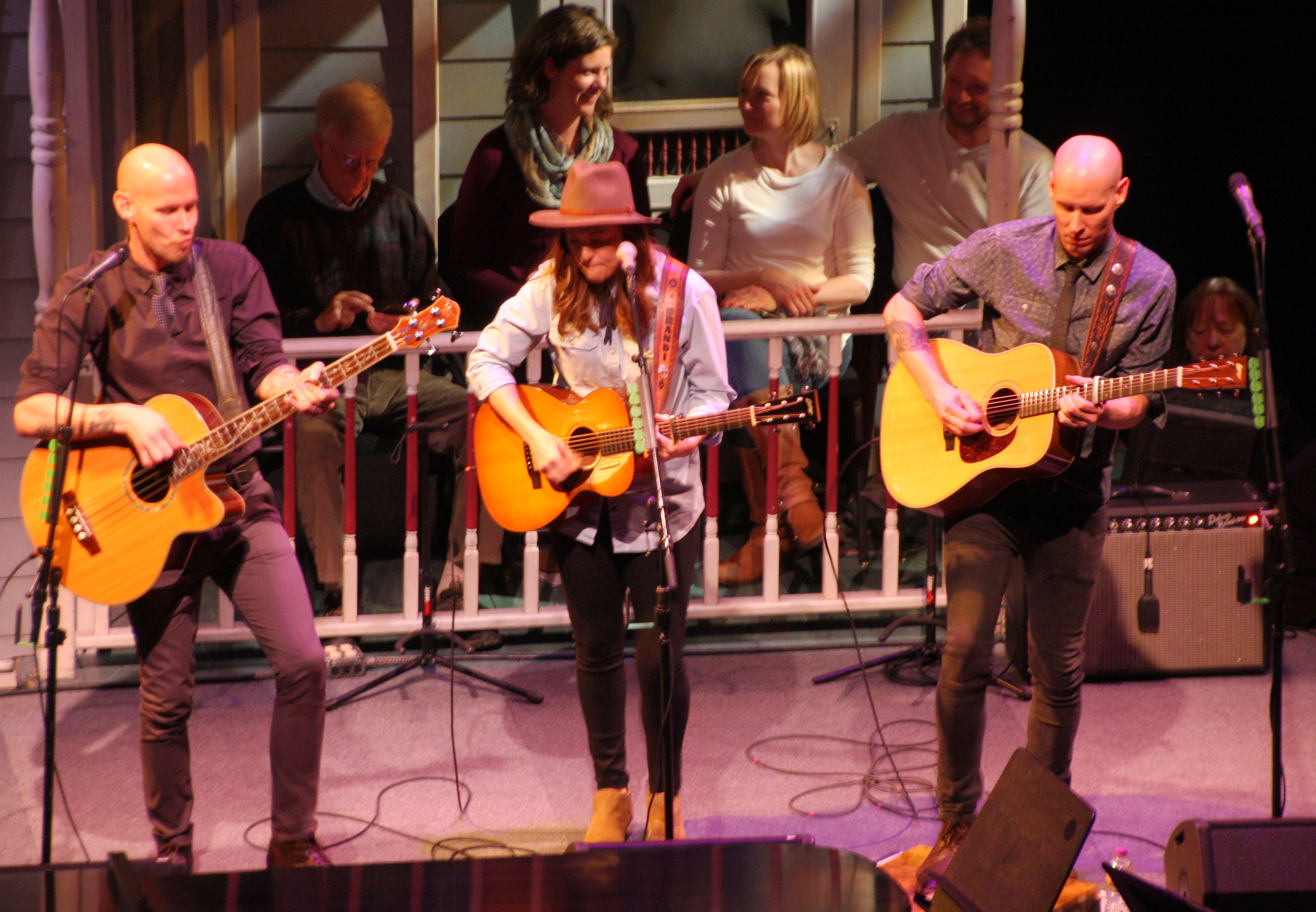
Carlile and the Hanseroth twins on A Prairie Home Companion in 2016

Carlile's fifth album, The Firewatcher's Daughter, was released on March 3, 2015, on ATO Records. In a preview of the album before release, the Boston Globe wrote, "Whether The Firewatcher's Daughter continues the country-folk flirtation of 2012's Bear Creek, returns to the warm adult songcraft of The Story and Give Up the Ghost, or explores some other direction entirely, she's sure to bring emotional intelligence, thoughtful clarity, and, most importantly, the most arresting female voice in pop this side of Adele. I'm betting on her."

"We didn't make any demos. To me rock and roll isn't really a genre but more of recklessness or a risk," Carlile told NPR. "The more something gets ironed out and sure of itself, the less it begins to rock somehow. That is what I think rock and roll is ... and it's scary." The preview track, "The Eye", for which a video was released prior to the album, is front-porch acoustic. The review from NPR Music said, ""The Eye" is exactly what it proclaims itself to be: a quiet breath in the midst of the album's glorious storm. Rooted in Carlile's love of both classic country and California pop, the song is the kind many other artists are going to want to cover. It will be hard to top the original, though; it so eloquently highlights the telepathic connection Carlile shares with her longtime bandmates. A favorite on recent tours, "The Eye" is destined to become a centerpiece in Carlile's catalog."

The album was No. 1 on Billboard's Top Rock Album Chart, and a first for her. This was Carlile's second consecutive album to break the Top-10 after Bear Creek topped out at No. 3. The album topped the charts in both US Folk and US Rock categories. The Current reviewing the album wrote,

I thought she leaned too adult-contemporary for my tastes. Boy, was I wrong! This might be her most rockin' album to date. The album starts like a house afire: Carlile totally nails the vocal on the gospel influenced "Wherever Is Your Heart", and this one makes you realize just how good she is. When she sings, you're a believer. She'll have you singing along on the infectious "The Thing I Regret". Maybe the biggest surprise on the album is "Mainstream Kid", which shows some grit! It's as badass as Carlile has ever sounded. If you had Brandi Carlile pegged as an adult-contemporary softie, you might try again. Brandi Carlile and the Hanseroth twins show that they aren't afraid to rock out. The Firewatcher's Daughter is a bold and welcome addition to her catalogue.

USA Today wrote, "The Firewatcher's Daughter is an album with a big heart, one that responds with love, not fear."

Carlile performed with the Avett Brothers on Late Show with David Letterman on May 4, 2015, singing the song popularized by the Carter Family, "Keep on the Sunny Side". On December 6, 2015, The Firewatcher's Daughter earned Carlile her first Grammy Award nomination, for Best Americana Album. Carlile was the featured musical guest on Late Night with Seth Meyers on April 7, 2016. She sang the song "Mainstream Kid" from The Firewatcher's Daughter, and dedicated the performance to Senator Bernie Sanders, who also appeared on the program that night.

=== 2017–2020: Grammy success with By the Way, I Forgive You ===
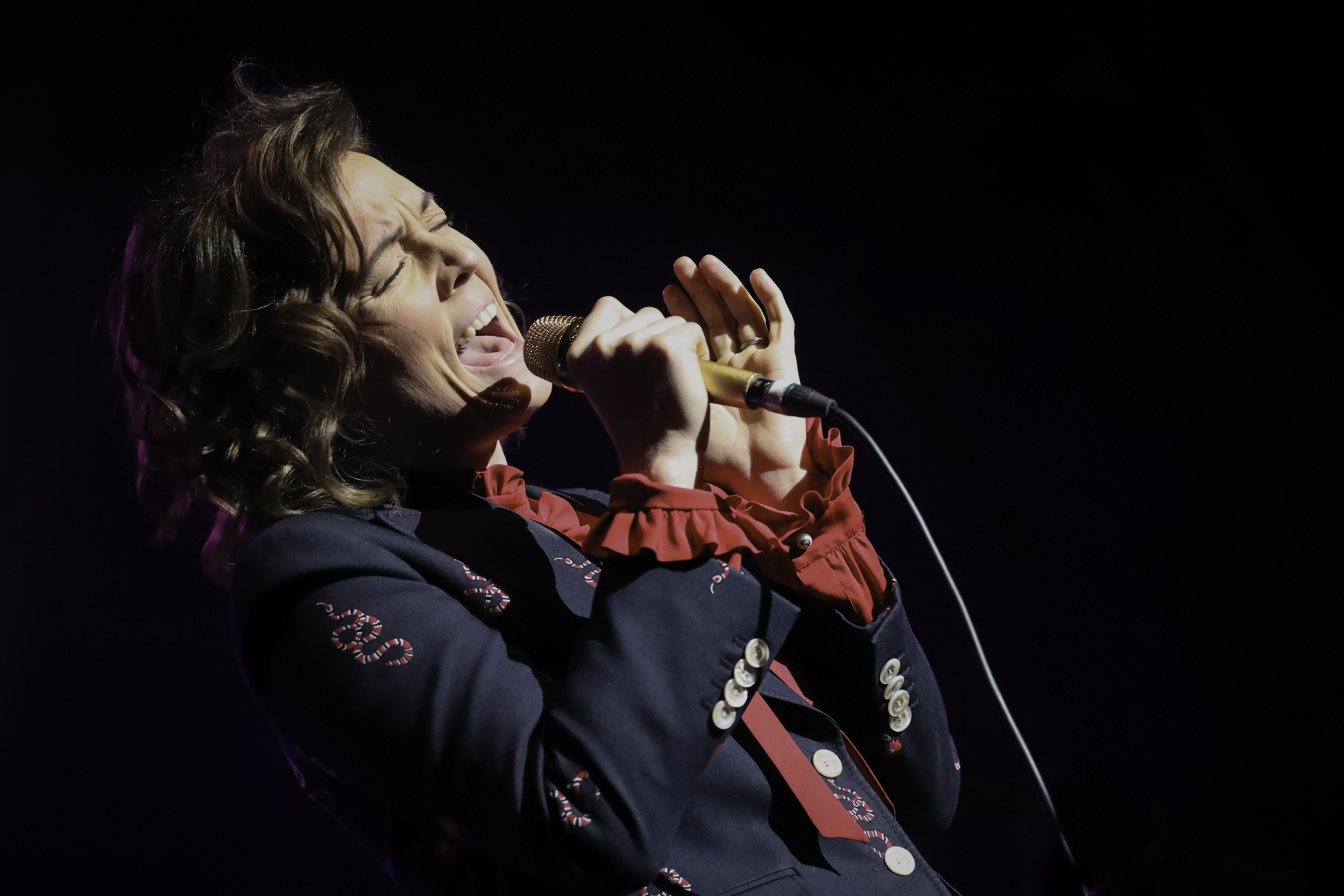
Carlile performing in Minneapolis in 2018

Carlile's sixth studio album, produced by Dave Cobb and Shooter Jennings, By the Way, I Forgive You, was released on February 16, 2018, and was preceded by three tracks: "The Joke", "The Mother", and "Sugartooth". Carlile performed songs from the album on Jimmy Kimmel Live!. She also made a guest appearance on John Prine's album The Tree of Forgiveness. By the Way, I Forgive You went on to become the highest-charting album of Carlile's career, reaching No. 5 on the Billboard 200. It also reached the number 1 position on the Billboard Top Rock Albums during the same week. The first single from the album, "The Joke", was listed on Former President Barack Obama's year-end playlist. The album received critical acclaim from critics, leading Carlile to receive six nominations at the 61st Annual Grammy Awards, the most nominations for a female in 2019, including the all-genre Album and Song of the Year categories. She won in three categories: Americana album and both best American roots song and best American roots performance (for "The Joke"). Several of the album's arrangements were created by British string and orchestral arranger Paul Buckmaster, who died in November 2017 two weeks after completing them. Carlile recalled in her autobiography that she had long admired the arrangements Buckmaster had created for Elton John's early albums and was delighted to have him arranging her music. His arrangement for the final song of the album, "Party of One", recorded in RCA studios with Buckmaster conducting a full orchestra, was the last of his career.

In 2019, Carlile co-founded the country music supergroup the Highwomen with Amanda Shires and Maren Morris, later adding Natalie Hemby to complete the line-up. Carlile appeared at Loretta Lynn's 87th birthday concert alongside Tanya Tucker, where the two performed a song from Tucker's upcoming album While I'm Livin', which Carlile produced with Shooter Jennings. The Highwomen also made their live debut during this concert, performing "It Wasn't God Who Made Honky Tonk Angels". Their debut single "Redesigning Women" was released on July 19, 2019, and their self-titled album was released on September 6 to critical acclaim. On January 16, 2019, Carlile appeared as part of a five-hour all-star tribute concert to Chris Cornell, which took place at The Forum in Los Angeles. Carlile performed a rendition of Temple of the Dog's "Hunger Strike", Audioslave's "Like a Stone", and Soundgarden's "Black Hole Sun". All proceeds of the event, hosted by Jimmy Kimmel, went to benefit the Chris and Vicky Cornell Foundation and the Epidermolysis Bullosa Medical Research Foundation. On October 14, 2019, Carlile performed Joni Mitchell's album Blue in its entirety in Los Angeles at Walt Disney Concert Hall.

In February 2020, Carlile was named Record Store Day 2020 Ambassador. On June 2, 2020, Carlile teamed up with remaining Soundgarden members Kim Thayil, Matt Cameron, and Ben Shepherd. At Seattle's London Bridge Studio, they re-recorded new versions of two Soundgarden's songs, "Black Hole Sun" and "Searching with My Good Eye Closed", which was released on a 12-inch single vinyl dubbed "A Rooster Says", during the second of three Record Store Day events on September 26, 2020. In October 2021 Rolling Stone reported that Carlile has expressed interest in continuing her collaboration with the surviving members of Soundgarden.

=== 2021–2023: Broken Horses and In These Silent Days ===
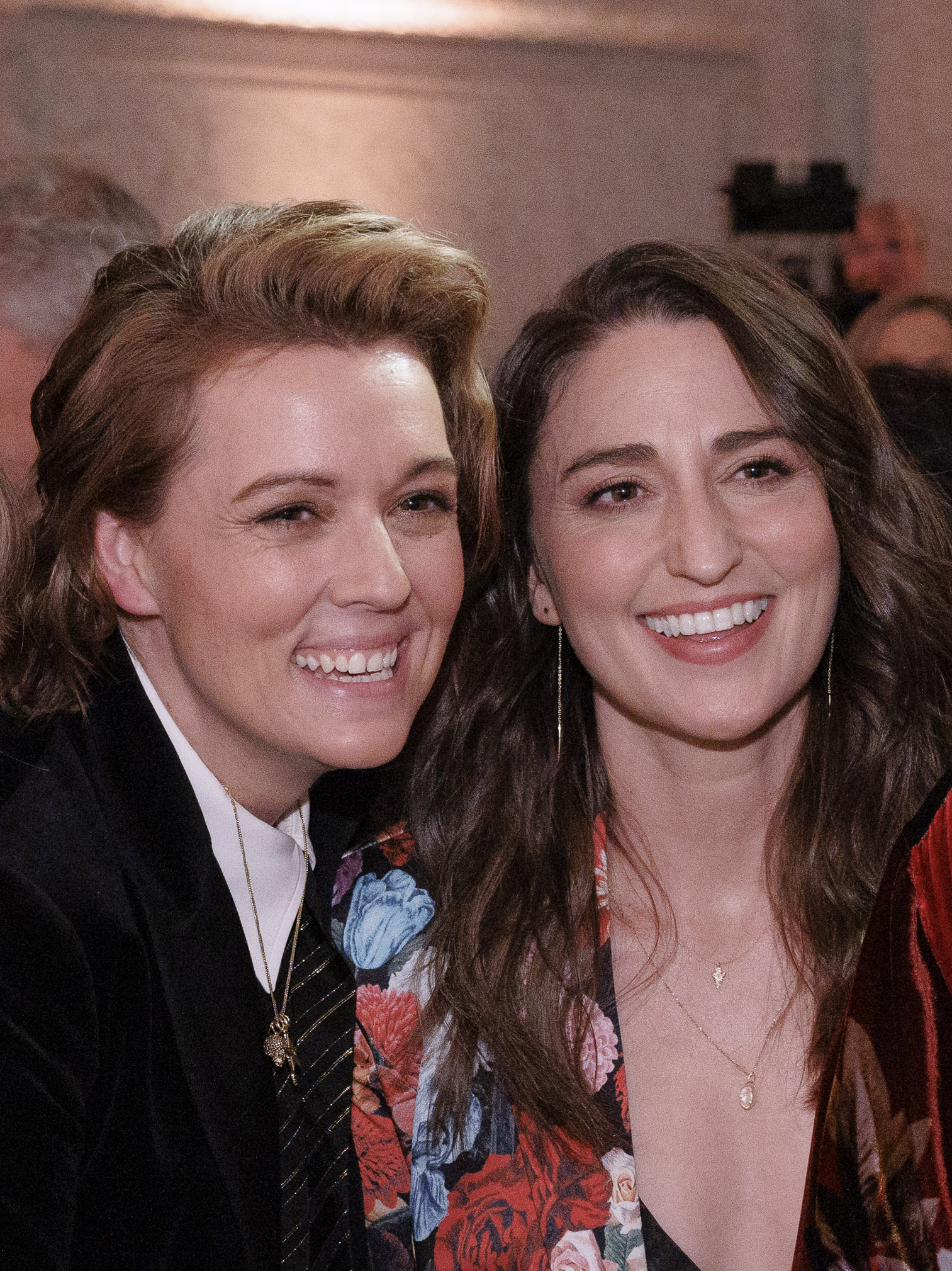
Carlile with Sara Bareilles at the 2023 Library of Congress Great Hall

In April 2021, Carlile released the autobiography Broken Horses: A Memoir. The book debuted at No. 1 in non-fiction on the New York Times Best Seller list. In late September 2021, City of Hope confirmed that Carlile would join the 16th annual Songs of Hope celebration program and would be honored with the 'She is the Music' Award, presented by Universal Music Publishing Group chairman and CEO Jody Gerson, on September 20, 2021.

On October 1, 2021, Carlile released her seventh album, In These Silent Days. The album debuted at No. 11 on the Billboard 200 and topped the Top Rock Albums and Americana/Folk Albums charts. It received critical acclaim, and the lead single "Right on Time" garnered Carlile three Grammy Award nominations in 2022, including Record of the Year and Song of the Year. The album earned Carlile seven more Grammy nominations in 2023, including Album of the Year and Best Americana Album (winning the latter), while the single "You and Me on the Rock" earned three nominations, including Record of the Year, and "Broken Horses" earned two nominations: Best Rock Performance and Best Rock Song (winning both).

On October 23, 2021, Carlile was the musical guest on NBC's Saturday Night Live, where she performed "Right on Time" and "Broken Horses". She reappeared the following year on SNL as musical guest on December 10, 2022, where she performed "The Story" and "You and Me on the Rock" with Lucius.

In 2022, Joni Mitchell performed with Carlile and her associates as the closing act of the Newport Folk Festival. Mitchell's presence was an unannounced surprise; the performance was billed as "Brandi Carlile and Friends." This was the 78-year-old Mitchell's first full-length performance since the early 2000s and her first appearance at the festival since 1969. The live performance was inducted into Mitchell's live album Joni Mitchell at Newport, also produced by Carlile, winning the Grammy Award for Best Folk Album. Carlile headlined the 2022 Pilgrimage Music & Cultural Festival in Franklin, Tennessee.

In January 2023, Carlile headlined the inauguration party for Massachusetts Governor Maura Healey, the first lesbian governor in the United States. In 2023, Carlile again teamed up with Tanya Tucker to produce, write and sing with Tucker on the critically acclaimed album Sweet Western Sound. Tucker and Carlile recorded a duet that appeared on Sweet Western Sound called "Breakfast in Birmingham".

=== 2024–present: Who Believes in Angels? and Returning to Myself ===
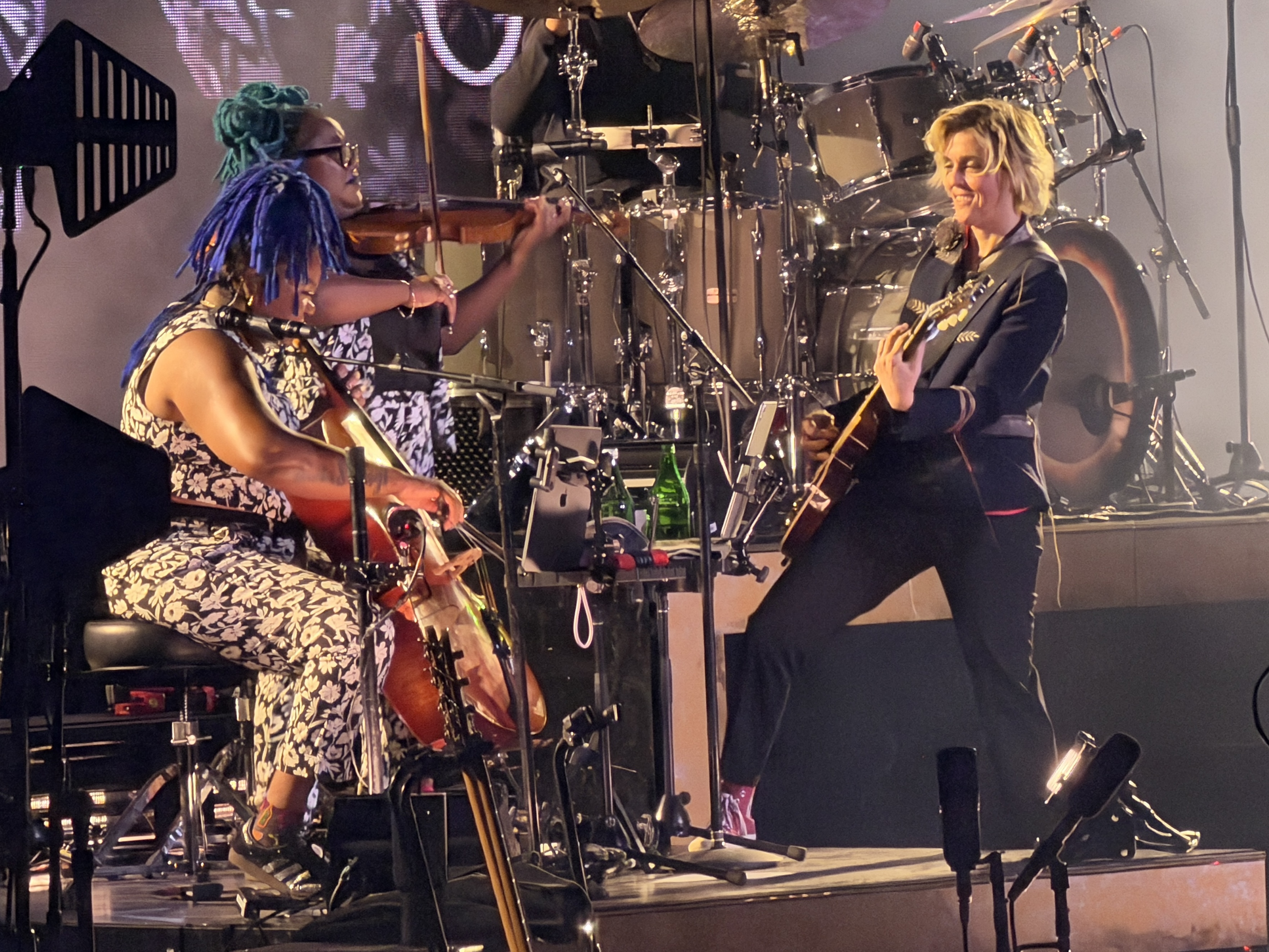
Carlile (right) performing with SistaStrings on the "Human Tour" at Chase Center in San Francisco in March 2026.

In 2024 Carlile collaborated with Elton John on the single "Never Too Late", the theme to John's 2024 documentary of the same name, which was nominated for Best Original Song at the 97th Academy Awards. The two artists released the collaborative album Who Believes in Angels? on 4 April 2025, through Interscope Records. It debuted at number nine on the Billboard 200 and at number one on the UK Albums Chart, becoming Carlile's first record project to achieve the latter. On April 5, 2025, she performed alongside Elton John on SNL to promote their new album Who Believes in Angels?.

On September 3, 2025, Carlile announced her eighth studio album Returning to Myself and released the album's title track as the lead single the same day. The album was released October 24, 2025. In 2025, Carlile also appeared in the feature documentary Lilith Fair: Building a Mystery – The Untold Story, which reflects on the legacy of the all-female music festival. She sang "America the Beautiful" at Super Bowl LX.

== Touring and performances ==
In July 2018, Carlile announced the creation of her own music festival, "Girls Just Wanna Weekend". The festival took place at Puerto Aventuras on the Riviera Maya in Mexico January 30 – February 3, 2019, and was fronted by all-female musicians such as Indigo Girls, Maren Morris, Margo Price, Patty Griffin, and others. Carlile was inspired to create her own festival after participating in the Cayamo Cruise festival for numerous years. In June 2025 in the UK, Carlile performed at the Opera House, Manchester, The Royal Concert Hall in Glasgow, and, later in the month, performed an afternoon set on The Pyramid Stage during Glastonbury Festival, Somerset.

Carlile has also created another all female festival, "Echoes Through the Canyon" at the Gorge Amphitheater in Quincy, Washington with performances in 2023 and in 2026. The 2023 lineup included Joni Mitchell and The Highwomen. The 2026 performers included the Indigo Girls, Sheryl Crow, Bonnie Raitt, Sara Bareilles, I'm With Her, Wynonna Judd, Brittney Spencer, and The Highwomen. Carlile mentioned the impact the all women Lilith Fair musical festival had on her when creating the festival.

== Personal life ==
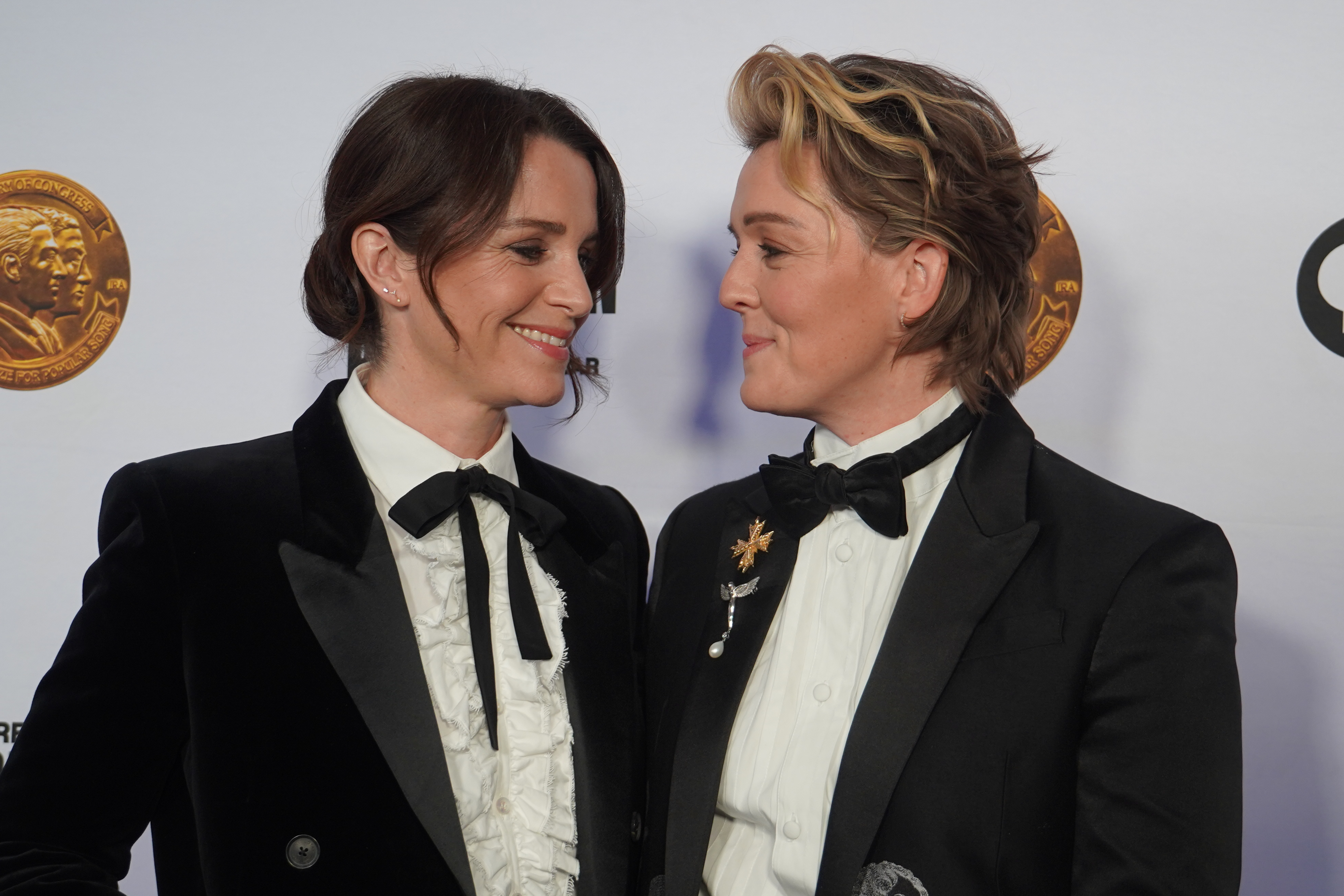
Carlile and her wife Catherine Shepherd in 2023

In a November 2002 interview, Carlile came out as a lesbian. She later told the Los Angeles Times, "I don't have to have a lot of formality around it ... there were people before me who paved the way."

In June 2012, she announced she was engaged to Catherine Shepherd, whom she had met in 2009. They married in Wareham, Massachusetts on September 15, 2012. They have two daughters. Since 2012, Shepherd has been the executive director of the Looking Out Foundation, Carlile's nonprofit. She had previously worked as Paul McCartney's charity coordinator for ten years.

Two of Carlile's longtime collaborators are Tim and Phil Hanseroth, with whom she has performed since she was 17 years old. Phil is now Carlile's brother-in-law, having married Carlile's younger sister Tiffany. The three of them have matching tattoos of the Auryn amulet, the double ouroboros that is the central magical item in the book and movie The Neverending Story.

Carlile keeps various animals, including a horse which she had for 20 years. She is an enthusiastic fisherwoman and owns a boat in which she travels to distant parts of the coast. Carlile lives in Maple Valley, Washington.

== Activism and humanitarian work ==
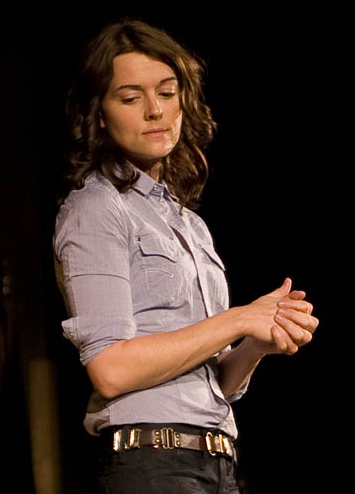
Carlile on stage in 2010

In 2008, Carlile and Tim and Phil Hanseroth established the Looking Out Foundation, a 501(c)(3) organization to give financial support to and raise awareness of causes in which they believe. The foundation has awarded grants to multiple organizations including Reverb, Honor the Earth, the Bridge School, Children in Conflict, Black Visions Collective, Campaign Zero, the Women's Funding Alliance, Doctors Without Borders, and the Human Rights Campaign. The Looking Out Foundation has launched numerous grassroots campaigns including Looking Out for the Hungry, Fund Racial Justice, COVID-19 Relief Fund, the IF Project, Fight the Fear, and the Story Campaign. Carlile donates $2 from every concert ticket sale to the foundation.

Carlile's wife, Catherine, served as the Looking Out Foundation's executive director from 2012 until 2024. She now sits on the board as chair. Since its inception, the Looking Out Foundation has donated almost $9 million to grassroots causes.

In May 2017, Carlile released Cover Stories, a benefit album featuring songs from her 2007 album, The Story. Troubled by the world's refugee crisis, and the impact it has on children, Carlile and Looking Out Foundation chose War Child UK as the beneficiary of the album and have raised $1 million to help the children. Former US President Barack Obama wrote the foreword.

In October 2018, Carlile teamed up with Sam Smith to re-imagine the single "Party of One" as a duet. Proceeds from the sale of the single went to the ongoing Story Campaign. In October 2020, Carlile and Alicia Keys urged people to vote with their song "A Beautiful Noise", which the pair performed on 'Every Vote Counts: A Celebration of Democracy' and aired on CBS on October 29.

In February 2023, the Looking Out Foundation raised $300,000 in seven days for the 2023 Turkey-Syria earthquake relief effort. Brandi and her wife Catherine were honored amongst People's 2023 Women Changing the World for their work with the Looking Out Foundation.

In February 2026, at the Minneapolis show of her The Human Tour, Carlile raised over $600,000 for The Advocates of Human Rights for families associated with protests around US Immigrations and Customs Enforcement (ICE) and border patrol agents who work in the city.

== Discography ==
Studio albums

- Brandi Carlile (2005)
- The Story (2007)
- Give Up the Ghost (2009)
- Bear Creek (2012)
- The Firewatcher's Daughter (2015)
- By the Way, I Forgive You (2018)
- In These Silent Days (2021)
- Returning to Myself (2025)

Collaborative albums

- The Highwomen (2019) – with the Highwomen
- Who Believes in Angels? (2025) – with Elton John

Other

- Cover Stories (2017)

as producer

- You Don't Own Me Anymore by The Secret Sisters (2017)
- While I'm Livin' by Tanya Tucker (2019)
- Saturn Return by The Secret Sisters (2020)
- Second Nature by Lucius (2022)
- Brandy Clark by Brandy Clark (2023)
- Sweet Western Sound by Tanya Tucker (2023)
- Joni Mitchell at Newport by Joni Mitchell (2023)

== Awards ==
=== Academy Awards ===
Academy Awards
Year	Nominated work	Category	Result	Ref.
2025	"Never Too Late" (Elton John, Brandi Carlile, Bernie Taupin and Andrew Watt)	Best Original Song	Nominated	

=== Grammy Awards ===
Carlile has received 11 Grammy Awards from 32 nominations. She is the first female songwriter to receive two Grammy nominations for Song of the Year in the same year; her nominations in 2022 being the first since 1994 that any songwriter or songwriting team was nominated for Song of the Year twice in the same year.

Grammy Awards
Year	Nominated work	Category	Result	Ref.
2016	The Firewatcher's Daughter	Best Americana Album	Nominated	
2019	By the Way, I Forgive You	Album of the Year	Nominated	
2019	By the Way, I Forgive You	Best Americana Album	Won	
2019	"The Joke"	Record of the Year	Nominated	
2019	"The Joke"	Song of the Year	Nominated	
2019	"The Joke"	Best American Roots Performance	Won	
2019	"The Joke"	Best American Roots Song	Won	
2020	While I'm Livin' (as producer)	Best Country Album	Won	
2020	"Bring My Flowers Now"	Song of the Year	Nominated	
2020	"Bring My Flowers Now"	Best Country Song	Won	
2020	"Common" (with Maren Morris)	Best Country Performance by a Duo or Group	Nominated	
2021	"Crowded Table"	Best Country Song	Won	
2021	"Carried Me with You" (from Onward)	Best Song Written for Visual Media	Nominated	
2022	"Right on Time"	Record of the Year	Nominated	
2022	"Right on Time"	Song of the Year	Nominated	
2022	"Right on Time"	Best Pop Solo Performance	Nominated	
2022	"A Beautiful Noise" (with Alicia Keys)	Song of the Year	Nominated	
2022	"Same Devil" (with Brandy Clark)	Best American Roots Performance	Nominated	
2023	In These Silent Days	Album of the Year	Nominated	
2023	In These Silent Days	Best Americana Album	Won	
2023	"You and Me on the Rock"	Record of the Year	Nominated	
2023	"You and Me on the Rock"	Best Americana Performance	Nominated	
2023	"You and Me on the Rock"	Best American Roots Song	Nominated	
2023	"Broken Horses"	Best Rock Performance	Won	
2023	"Broken Horses"	Best Rock Song	Won	
2024	"Dear Insecurity" (with Brandy Clark)	Best Americana Performance	Won	
2024	Joni Mitchell At Newport (as producer)	Best Folk Album	Won	
2024	"Thousand Miles" (with Miley Cyrus)	Best Pop Duo/Group Performance	Nominated	
2026	"Never Too Late" (from Elton John: Never Too Late)	Best Song Written For Visual Media	Nominated	
2026	Who Believes in Angels? (with Elton John)	Best Traditional Pop Vocal Album	Nominated	
2027	"Returning to Myself"	Best Americana Performance	Pending	
2027	"Returning to Myself"	Best American Roots Song	Pending	
2027	"You Without Me"	Best American Roots Performance	Pending	
2027	Returning to Myself	Best Americana Album	Pending	

=== Emmy Awards ===
Children's and Family Emmy Awards
Year	Category	Nominated Work	Result	Ref.
2022	Outstanding Short Form Program	We the People	Won	
2023	Outstanding Original Song for a Preschool Program	"One Sacred Thing" from Jam Van: Anne & Lamb Find A Family with Brandi Carlile	Won	

=== Other awards and nominations ===
In 2026, Austin City Limits inducted Ms. Carlile into their Hall of Fame. Bonnie Raitt officiated and sang a song in tribute on the PBS broadcast on July 1st.

Carlile won Seattle's City of Music Breakthrough Award for 2010.

Association	Year	Category	Nominated Work	Result	Ref.
Academy of Country Music Awards	2020	Group of the Year	The Highwomen	Nominated	
Academy of Country Music Awards	2021	Group of the Year	The Highwomen	Nominated	
Americana Music Honors & Awards	2018	Artist of the Year	Brandi Carlile	Nominated	
Americana Music Honors & Awards	2018	Song of the Year	"The Joke"	Nominated	
Americana Music Honors & Awards	2018	Album of the Year	By the Way, I Forgive You	Nominated	
Americana Music Honors & Awards	2019	Artist of the Year	Brandi Carlile	Won	
Americana Music Honors & Awards	2020	Artist of the Year	Brandi Carlile	Nominated	
Americana Music Honors & Awards	2020	Duo/Group of the Year	The Highwomen	Won	
Americana Music Honors & Awards	2020	Album of the Year	The Highwomen	Won	
Americana Music Honors & Awards	2020	Album of the Year	While I'm Livin'	Nominated	
Americana Music Honors & Awards	2020	Song of the Year	"Crowded Table"	Won	
Americana Music Honors & Awards	2020	Song of the Year	"Bring My Flowers Now"	Nominated	
Americana Music Honors & Awards	2021	Artist of the Year	Brandi Carlile	Won	
Americana Music Honors & Awards	2022	Artist of the Year	Brandi Carlile	Nominated	
Americana Music Honors & Awards	2022	Album of the Year	In These Silent Days	Nominated	
Americana Music Honors & Awards	2022	Song of the Year	"Right on Time"	Won	
Billboard Women in Music	2019	Trailblazer Award	Brandi Carlile	Won	
CMT Music Awards	2019	Impact Award	Brandi Carlile	Won	
CMT Music Awards	2019	Female Video of the Year	"The Joke"	Nominated	
CMT Music Awards	2019	CMT Performance of the Year	Natural Woman (with Maren Morris)	Nominated	
CMT Music Awards	2019	Group Video of the Year	"Crowded Table" (with The Highwomen)	Nominated	
GLAAD Media Awards	2010	Outstanding Music Artist	Brandi Carlile	Nominated	
GLAAD Media Awards	2019	Outstanding Music Artist	Brandi Carlile	Nominated	
GLAAD Media Awards	2022	Outstanding Music Artist	Brandi Carlile	Nominated	
Hollywood Music in Media Awards	2020	Best Original Song — Animated Film	"Carried Me with You"	Nominated	
Hollywood Music in Media Awards	2022	Best Original Song – Documentary	"Ready As I'll Never Be"	Won	
Hollywood Music in Media Awards	2024	Best Original Song – Documentary	"Never Too Late"	Won	
Hollywood Music in Media Awards	2025	Best Original Song – Documentary	"Salt then Sour then Sweet"	Nominated	
Pop Awards	2022	Icon of the Year	Brandi Carlile	Won	
Satellite Awards	2025	Best Original Song	"Never Too Late"	Nominated	
Society of Composers & Lyricists	2025	Outstanding Original Song for a Dramatic or Documentary Visual Media Production	"Never Too Late"	Nominated	
Society of Composers & Lyricists	2026	Outstanding Original Song for a Dramatic or Documentary Visual Media Production	"Salt Then Sour Then Sweet"	Nominated	
UK Americana Awards	2018	International Album of the Year	By the Way, I Forgive You	Nominated	
UK Americana Awards	2018	International Song of the Year	"The Joke"	Won	
UK Americana Awards	2019	International Song of the Year	"The Joke"	Won	
UK Americana Awards	2019	International Album of the Year	By the Way, I Forgive You	Nominated	
UK Americana Awards	2023	International Artist of the Year	Brandi Carlile	Nominated	
UK Americana Awards	2023	International Album of the Year	In These Silent Days	Nominated	
World Soundtrack Awards	2025	Best Original Song	"Never Too Late"	Nominated	

== See also ==
- LGBTQ representation in country music
