= Right on Time (Brandi Carlile song) =

Single by Brandi Carlile

from the album In These Silent Days
- Released: July 21, 2021
- Studio: RCA Studio A (Nashville, Tennessee)
- Genre: Folk rock
- Length: 3:05
- Label: Low Country Sound; Elektra
- Songwriters: Brandi Carlile; Dave Cobb; Phil and Tim Hanseroth
- Producers: Dave Cobb; Shooter Jennings

Brandi Carlile singles chronology
"Speak Your Mind" (2021)	"Right on Time" (2021)	"We Don't Know We're Living" (2021)

"Right on Time" is a song by American singer-songwriter Brandi Carlile, released on July 21, 2021 as the lead single from her seventh studio album In These Silent Days. The song received three Grammy Award nominations for Record of the Year, Song of the Year, and Best Pop Solo Performance.

== Background ==
The song was written when Carlile was quarantining in the Washington countryside during the early days of the COVID-19 pandemic. According to Carlile, the song's lyrics refer to events that happened during the pandemic: "babies were born, divorces were had, people died, and there's something really human about the obstacles that we've put in front of ourselves."

== Live performances ==
Carlile performed "Right on Time" on The Tonight Show Starring Jimmy Fallon on July 21, 2021, coinciding with the release of the music video. She also performed the song on The Howard Stern Show on October 5, 2021; Saturday Night Live on October 23, 2021, and at the 64th Annual Grammy Awards on April 3, 2022.

== Music video ==
Carlile released the video for the song on July 21, 2021. The music video for the song was directed by American actress Courteney Cox. The video's look, which has been compared to David Bowie's aesthetic, was designed by stylist Maryam Malakpour. Since part of the video was shot underwater, Carlile had to take swimming lessons to overcome her lifelong aquaphobia.

== Alternate versions ==
Carlile has released two alternate versions of the song. On August 27, 2021, she released a stripped-down version, "Right on Time (In Harmony)". On September 24, 2021, she released a live version of the single recorded at Red Rocks Amphitheatre with the Colorado Symphony.

== Personnel ==
- Brandi Carlile – vocals and piano
- Tim Hanseroth – electric guitar
- Phil Hanseroth – bass
- Dave Cobb – acoustic guitar
- Shooter Jennings – organ
- Chris Powell – drums
- Tom Elmhirst – mixing

== Charts ==
Chart performance for "Right on Time"
Chart (2021–2022)	Peak position
US Digital Song Sales (Billboard)	26
US Hot Rock & Alternative Songs (Billboard)	43
US Rock & Alternative Airplay (Billboard)	44
