= Linda Chorney =

American singer (born 1960)

Linda Gail Chorney (born 1960) is an American singer-songwriter and award-winning filmmaker, originally from Sudbury, Massachusetts.

A 1978 graduate of Lincoln-Sudbury Regional High School, Chorney never graduated from the University of Miami. Her 2011 album, Emotional Jukebox, gained notoriety after receiving a nomination for the 2012 Grammy Award in the category of Best Americana Album. Her nomination, gained through a self-promotion strategy that relied heavily on social media, attracted both praise and criticism. Some media outlets characterized the nomination as a victory for independent artists, while others suggested she was "gaming the system," due to the fact that she was unknown by executives within the Americana Music Association. Despite her nomination in the Americana Grammy category, she has never been nominated for any awards by the Americana Music Association. In 2013, Chorney released a book entitled Who the F**K Is Linda Chorney, detailing the experience. In 2015 Chorney helped fund a bronze statue of a victim of the 2013 Boston Marathon Tragedy at Bridgewater State University, through the efforts of her song, "Martin."

In 2016 Chorney produced her first documentary The Opening Act, which won 2 Best Documentary Awards, With her new film, The Opening Act, she once again pulls back the curtain and in 2018 Chorney produced her first feature film, When I Sing, garnering critical acclaim. In 2021, she was belatedly nominated for a Grammy in the American roots song category, after her name was absent from the official nominations though some early news accounts had listed her as a nominee.

Chorney has been a resident of Sea Bright, New Jersey, and wrote a song about her experiences with flooding in the aftermath of Hurricane Sandy.

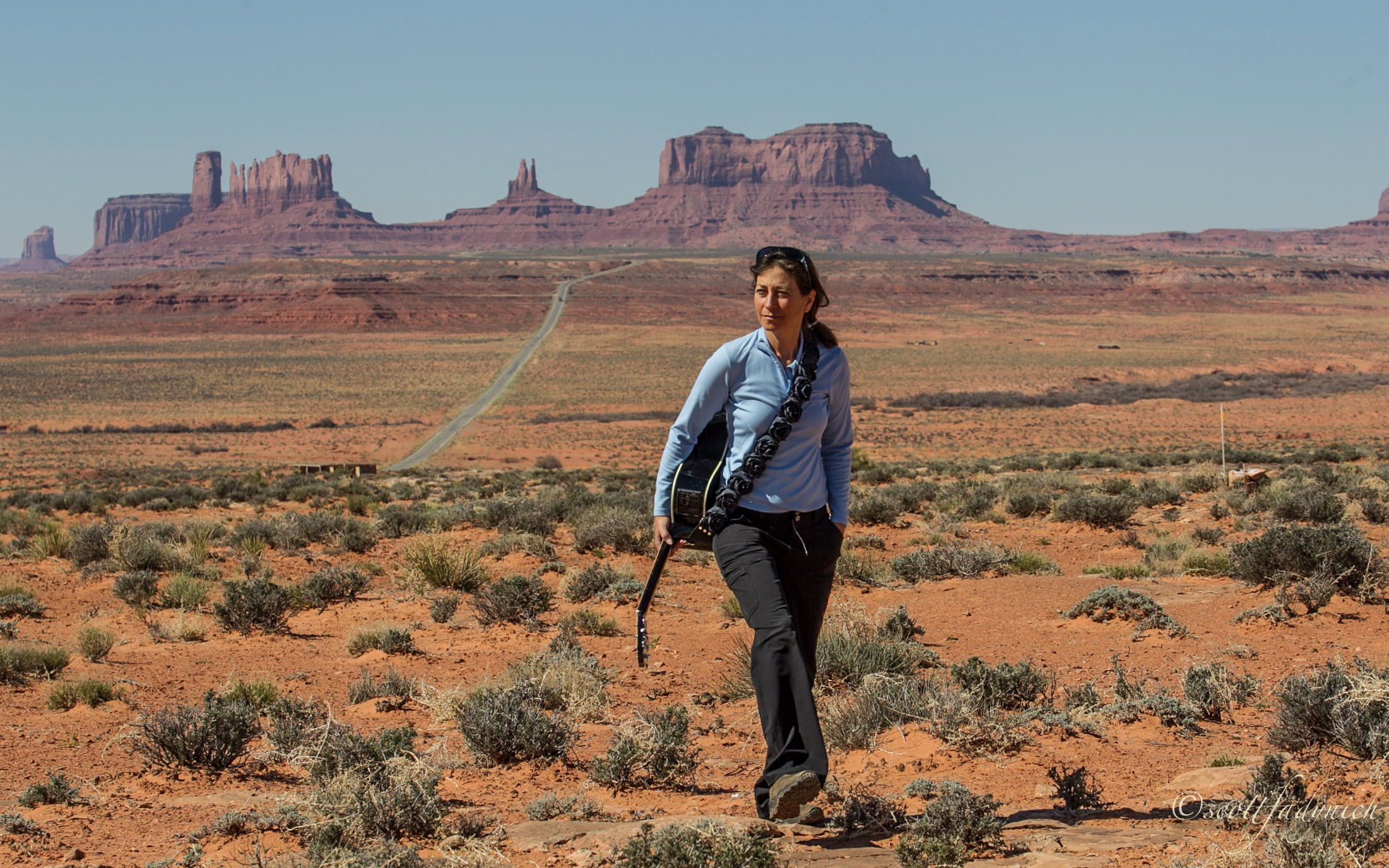
Linda Chorney Hikes The World

== Discography ==
- Mt Blunt Instrument (1995)
- Racing With Reality (1998)
- Me So Chorney (2001)
- 1 Kiss at a Time (2005)
- CHORNographEY (2008) – released July 23, 2008
- Emotional Jukebox (2011) – released January 8, 2011
- Oysters (2016)
