= List of awards and nominations received by Jon Batiste =

Jon Batiste awards and nominations
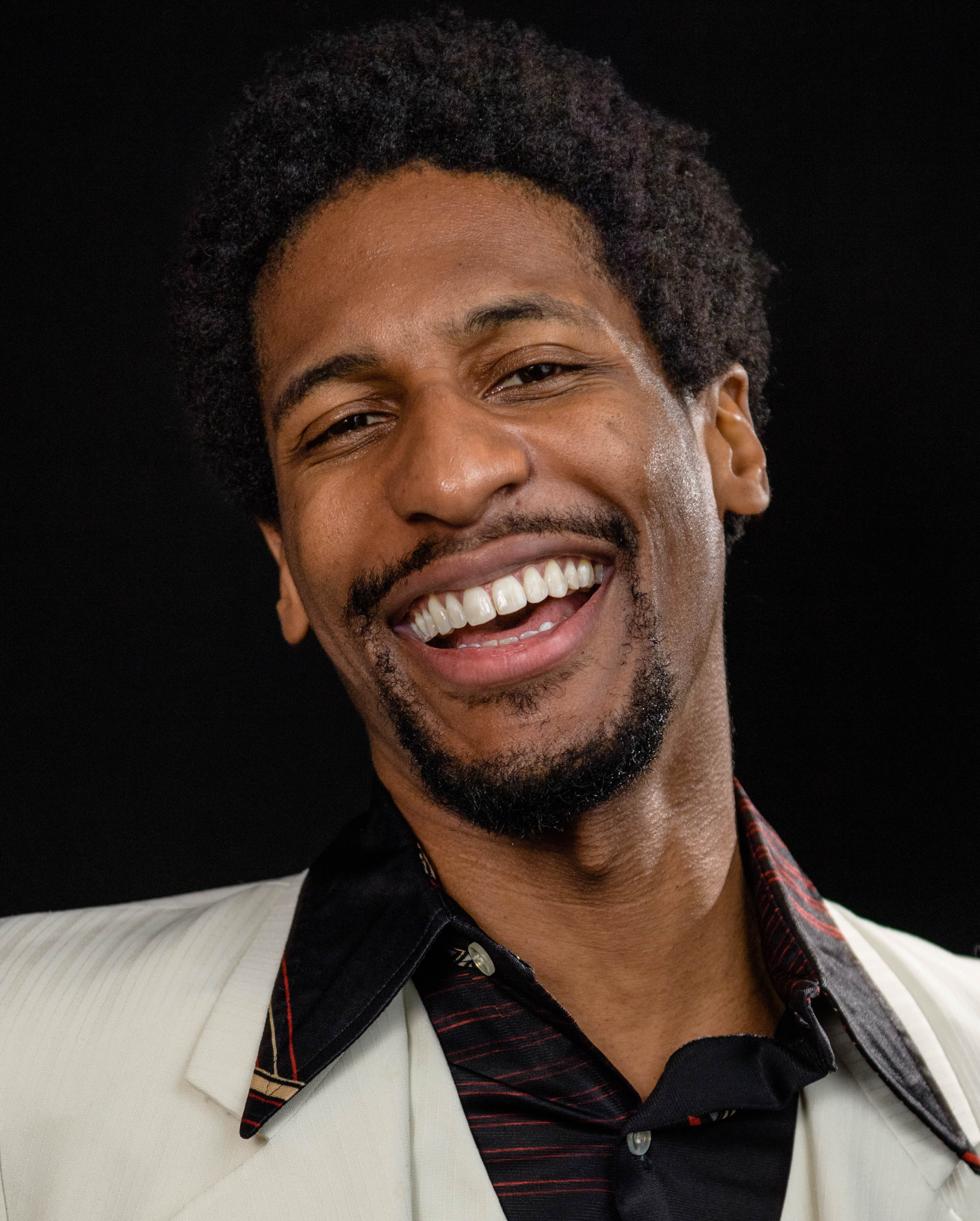
- Jon Batiste in 2018
Award	Wins	Nominations
Academy Awards	1	2
BAFTA Awards	1	1
Golden Globe Awards	1	1
Grammy Awards	8	25
News and Documentary Emmy Awards	0	1
Primetime Emmy Awards	0	1
Sports Emmy Awards	1	1
Screen Actors Guild Awards	0	1

Jon Batiste is an American musician, bandleader and television personality.

The following are a list of his wins and nominations for awards in music. Batiste won an Academy Award, British Academy Film Award, and a Golden Globe Award for his original score of the Disney-Pixar film Soul (2020). He has also received twenty-five nominations at the Grammy Awards; winning eight, including Album of the Year for We Are (2021). He received a nomination for Outstanding Performance by a Cast in a Motion Picture at the 30th Screen Actors Guild Awards, as part of the ensemble for the 2023 film The Color Purple.

== Major associations ==
=== Academy Awards ===
Year	Category	Nominated work	Result	Ref.
2020	Best Original Score	Soul	Won	
2023	Best Original Song	"It Never Went Away" (from American Symphony)	Nominated	

=== British Academy Film Awards ===
Year	Category	Nominated work	Result	Ref.
2020	Best Original Music	Soul	Won	

=== Emmy Awards ===
Year	Category	Nominated work	Result	Ref.
Primetime Emmy Awards
2022	Outstanding Variety Talk Series	The Late Show with Stephen Colbert (Note: as a Producer.)	Nominated	
Sports Emmy Awards
2022	Outstanding Open/Tease	2022 NCAA March Madness: "NOLA Vibes featuring Jon Batiste" (Note: as an Executive Producer.)	Won	
News & Documentary Emmy Awards
2022	Outstanding Music Composition	The First Wave	Nominated	

=== Golden Globe Awards ===
Year	Category	Nominated work	Result	Ref.
2020	Best Original Score	Soul	Won	

=== Grammy Awards ===
Year	Category	Nominated work	Result	Ref.
2019	Best American Roots Performance	"St. James Infirmary Blues"	Nominated	
2021	Best Contemporary Instrumental Album	Chronology of a Dream: Live at The Village Vanguard	Nominated	
2021	Best New Age Album	Meditations	Nominated	
2022	Album of the Year	We Are	Won	
2022	Best R&B Album	We Are	Nominated	
2022	Record of the Year	"Freedom"	Nominated	
2022	Best Music Video	"Freedom"	Won	
2022	Best Traditional R&B Performance	"I Need You"	Nominated	
2022	Best Improvised Jazz Solo	“Bigger Than Us”	Nominated	
2022	Best Jazz Instrumental Album	Jazz Selections: Music from and Inspired by Soul	Nominated	
2022	Best Score Soundtrack for Visual Media	Soul	Won (Note: Tied with Carlos Rafael Rivera for The Queen's Gambit.)	
2022	Best Contemporary Classical Composition	Batiste: Movement 11'	Nominated	
2022	Best American Roots Song	"Cry"	Won	
2022	Best American Roots Performance	"Cry"	Won	
2024	Best American Roots Performance	"Butterfly"	Nominated	
2024	Song of the Year	"Butterfly"	Nominated	
2024	Album of the Year	World Music Radio	Nominated	
2024	Record of the Year	"Worship"	Nominated	
2024	Best Pop Duo/Group Performance	"Candy Necklace" (with Lana Del Rey)	Nominated	
2024	Best Jazz Performance	"Movement 18' (Heroes)"	Nominated	
2025	Best Music Film	American Symphony	Won	
2025	Best Song Written for Visual Media	"It Never Went Away" (from American Symphony)	Won	
2026	Best Americana Album	Big Money	Won	
2026	Best American Roots Performance	"Lonely Avenue" (with Randy Newman)	Nominated	
2026	Best American Roots Song	"Big Money"	Nominated	
2027	Best Jazz Performance	"In Walked Bud"	Pending	
2027	Best Jazz Instrumental Album	Monk Movements	Pending	
2027	Best Contemporary Instrumental Album	Monk Movements	Pending	
2027	Best Classical Compendium	Black Mozart	Pending	

=== Screen Actors Guild Awards ===
Year	Category	Nominated work	Result	Ref.
2023	Outstanding Performance by a Cast in a Motion Picture	The Color Purple	Nominated	

== Miscellaneous awards ==
Award	Year	Category	Nominated work	Result	Ref.
African-American Film Critics Association Awards	2023	Best Ensemble	The Color Purple	Won	
American Society of Composers, Authors and Publishers	2020	Outstanding Original Score for a Studio Film	Soul	Won	
Annie Awards	2020	Outstanding Achievement for Music in an Animated Feature Production	Soul	Won	
Astra Film and Creative Awards	2023	Best Ensemble	The Color Purple	Won	
Austin Film Critics Association Awards	2020	Best Score	Soul	Won	
Black Reel Awards	2020	Outstanding Original Score	Soul	Won	
Black Reel Awards	2023	Outstanding Original Score	American Symphony	Nominated	
Black Reel Awards	2023	Outstanding Original Song	"It Never Went Away" (from American Symphony)	Nominated	
Black Reel Awards	2024	Outstanding Score	Saturday Night	Nominated	
Chicago Film Critics Association Awards	2020	Best Original Score	Soul	Won	
Cinema Eye Honors	2023	Outstanding Original Score	American Symphony	Nominated	
Cinema Eye Honors	2023	The Unforgettables	American Symphony	Won	
Critics' Choice Movie Awards	2020	Best Score	Soul	Won	
Critics' Choice Movie Awards	2023	Best Acting Ensemble	The Color Purple	Nominated	
Critics' Choice Documentary Awards	2023	Best Score	American Symphony	Won	
Celebration of Cinema and Television	2023	Ensemble Award – Film	The Color Purple	Won	
Florida Film Critics Circle Awards	2020	Best Score	Soul	Won	
Georgia Film Critics Association Awards	2020	Best Original Score	Soul	Won	
Georgia Film Critics Association Awards	2023	Best Ensemble	The Color Purple	Nominated	
Guild of Music Supervisors Awards	2023	Best Song Written and/or Recording Created for a Film	"It Never Went Away" (from American Symphony)	Nominated	
Hollywood Critics Association Awards	2020	Best Score	Soul	Won	
Hollywood Music in Media Awards	2020	Best Original Score in an Animated Film	Soul	Won	
Hollywood Music in Media Awards	2021	Best Original Song in a Documentary Film	"Breathe" (from The First Wave)	Nominated	
Hollywood Music in Media Awards	2024	Best Original Score in a Feature Film	Saturday Night	Nominated	
Houston Film Critics Society Awards	2020	Best Original Score	Soul	Won	
International Cinephile Society Awards	2020	Best Original Score	Soul	Nominated	
International Film Music Critics Association Awards	2020	Best Original Score for an Animated Film	Soul	Nominated	
Las Vegas Film Critics Society Awards	2020	Best Score	Soul	Won	
Latino Entertainment Journalists Association Film Awards	2020	Best Musical Score	Soul	Won	
MTV Video Music Awards	2023	Best Alternative Video	"Candy Necklace" (with Lana Del Rey)	Won	
NAACP Image Awards	2020	Outstanding Soundtrack/Compilation Album	Soul: Original Motion Picture Soundtrack	Won	
NAACP Image Awards	2020	Outstanding Jazz Album – Instrumental	Music From and Inspired by Soul	Won	
NAACP Image Awards	2023	Outstanding Male Artist	Himself	Nominated	
NAACP Image Awards	2023	Outstanding Ensemble Cast in a Motion Picture	The Color Purple	Won	
North Dakota Film Society Awards	2023	Best Original Song	"It Never Went Away" (from American Symphony)	Nominated	
OffBeat's Best of the Beat Awards	2018	Best Contemporary Jazz Album	Hollywood Africans	Won	
OffBeat's Best of the Beat Awards	2019	Best Contemporary Jazz Album	Chronology of a Dream – Live at the Village Vanguard	Won	
OffBeat's Best of the Beat Awards	2021–2022	Album of the Year	We Are	Won	
OffBeat's Best of the Beat Awards	2021–2022	Best Blues, R&B or Funk Album	We Are	Won	
OffBeat's Best of the Beat Awards	2021–2022	Allen Toussaint Award Songwriter of the Year	—N/a	Won	
OffBeat's Best of the Beat Awards	2023	Artist of the Year	—N/a	Won	
OffBeat's Best of the Beat Awards	2023	Album of the Year	World Music Radio	Won	
OffBeat's Best of the Beat Awards	2023	Song of the Year	"Butterfly"	Won	
OffBeat's Best of the Beat Awards	2023	Best R&B / Funk Artist	—N/a	Won	
OffBeat's Best of the Beat Awards	2023	Best R&B / Funk Album	World Music Radio	Won	
OffBeat's Best of the Beat Awards	2023	Allen Toussaint Award Songwriter of the Year	—N/a	Won	
Online Film & Television Association Awards	2020	Best Original Score	Soul	Won	
Phoenix Critics Circle Awards	2020	Best Score	Soul	Won	
Pop Awards	2022	Music Video of the Year	"I Need You"	Won	
Pop Awards	2022	Icon of the Year	Jon Batiste	Won	
San Francisco Bay Area Film Critics Circle Awards	2020	Best Original Score	Soul	Won	
Satellite Awards	2023	Best Original Song	"It Never Went Away" (from American Symphony)	Nominated	
Seattle Film Critics Society Awards	2020	Best Original Score	Soul	Won	
Society of Composers & Lyricists Awards	2020	Outstanding Original Score for a Studio Film	Soul	Won	
Society of Composers & Lyricists Awards	2023	Outstanding Original Score for an Independent Film	American Symphony	Nominated	
Society of Composers & Lyricists Awards	2023	Outstanding Original Song for a Dramatic or Documentary Visual Media Production	"It Never Went Away" (from American Symphony)	Nominated	
St. Louis Gateway Film Critics Association Awards	2020	Best Score	Soul	Won	
Washington D.C. Area Film Critics Association Awards	2020	Best Original Score	Soul	Won	
World Soundtrack Awards	2020	Film Composer of the Year	Soul	Nominated	
World Soundtrack Awards	2024	Best Original Song	"It Never Went Away" (from American Symphony)	Nominated	
