= Saturday Night (soundtrack) =

Saturday Night (Original Score)

Film score by Jon Batiste
- Released: September 27, 2024
- Recorded: 2024
- Venue: Atlanta, Georgia; Fayetteville, Georgia
- Genre: Film score
- Length: 33:51
- Label: Verve
- Producer: Jon Batiste

Jon Batiste chronology
World Music Radio (2023)	Saturday Night (Original Score) (2024)

Saturday Night (Original Score) is the film score soundtrack to the 2024 film Saturday Night directed by Jason Reitman, who co-wrote it with Gil Kenan. The film score was written and recorded live on sets by singer-songwriter and multi-instrumentalist Jon Batiste, with the album presenting 23 tracks from his score. Verve Music released the soundtrack on September 27, 2024, the same day as the United States limited theatrical release.

== Development ==
On March 28, 2024, the producers announced that Jon Batiste would appear in the film as singer-songwriter Billy Preston, the first guest who appeared in the Saturday Night Live show when it aired on October 11, 1975. Besides starring in the film, he would also provide the musical score. The film would be his maiden stint in full-fledged score composition. He worked in Soul (2020) as a co-composer providing jazz selections, with Trent Reznor and Atticus Ross, and in the documentary film American Symphony (2020).

According to Batiste, Reitman needed an "anti-score" that was different from the paradigm of traditional film scores and "something that felt alive and raw". After filming his portions, Batiste each day returned to sets and Reitman showcased him the scenes before recording. Since most of the music written were based on the script, he would improvise it and instruct the conductor for the jazz band to perform. Much of the musical score was recorded live on sets.

Batiste added that improvising pre-recorded music was "an African diasporic approach", a process which he attributed it to his roots in New Orleans. He stated, "The way I learned in New Orleans, where they would dictate the music to you verbally and they would play the music to you." Afro-American percussionist and drummer Pedrito Martinez performed the solos.

== Release ==
The album was distributed by Verve Records which released on September 27, 2024, in conjunction with the film's limited theatrical release.

== Reception ==
Peter Debruge of Variety wrote "Batiste supplies a jumpy jazz score — full of clangs, bangs, rattles and drums — that's both innovative (recorded live, like the show) and effective." Derek Smith, in his review for Slant Magazine, opined that Batiste's score aped the musical style of Jon Brion. Mauren Lee Lenker of Entertainment Weekly wrote that Batiste's jazzy score "evokes the sound of the SNL house band."

Chris Feil of The Daily Beast described the score as "divine, invigorating" and Ethan Anderson of /Film called it as "funky, ticking". Pete Hammond of Deadline Hollywood called it as a "lively score". Gary M. Kramer of Salon.com described that Batiste's score "also contributes to the film's nimbleness, providing a jazzy, jaunty backdrop for all of the enveloping action."

== Track listing ==
Saturday Night (Original Score) track listing
No.	Title	Length
1.	"Lorne on 50th Street"	2:03
2.	"SNL Variations, Carson Call, Variation 8"	0:44
3.	"Togas! Garrett! Rumpus!"	0:52
4.	"Welcome to 8H"	3:31
5.	"SNL Variations, Toscanini Died, Variation 1 (Speakers Went Out)"	0:28
6.	"SNL Variations, In Walked Carlin, Variation 2"	2:36
7.	"SNL Variations, Go Live!, Variation 3"	1:10
8.	"17th Floor Piano (Happy Joe)"	3:20
9.	"Lorne and Rosie Theme"	1:35
10.	"SNL Variations, Couch Fire, Variation 4"	0:56
11.	"SNL Variations, No Habla Muppet, Variation 5"	1:02
12.	"SNL Variations, Laying Bricks, Variation 6"	0:48
13.	"Builders Theme, Clean Shirt Full House, Variation 1"	1:55
14.	"Real Bricks"	1:59
15.	"Chevy Lands Update"	0:35
16.	"Saturday Night Live"	2:35
17.	"SNL Variations, Billy and Valri, Variation 7"	0:35
18.	"Looking for Belushi"	1:15
19.	"Lorne and Rosie Theme Reprise"	1:14
20.	"Waiting for Andy"	1:32
21.	"Builders Theme, Screen Test, Variation 2"	1:18
22.	"The Wolverines"	1:08
23.	"Family Photo"	0:40
Total length:		33:51
