= It Never Went Away =

2023 song by Jon Batiste

Song by Jon Batiste
- Released: November 24, 2023
- Genre: Pop
- Length: 3:48
- Label: Universal Music Group
- Songwriters: Jon Batiste; Dan Wilson

Music video
- "It Never Went Away" on YouTube

It Never Went Away is a song written by Jon Batiste and Dan Wilson for the documentary American Symphony. The film song won the Grammy Award for Best Song Written for Visual Media at the 67th Annual Grammy Awards. It was also nominated for an Academy Award for Best Original Song at the 96th Academy Awards.

== Background ==
While the film American Symphony documents the marriage between Batiste and Suleika Jaouad as Jaoaud battles leukemia, the song is intended to celebrate a serene, enduring love beyond the limitations of the physical world. The piano ballad is inspired by lullabies that Batiste wrote and played for his wife to help her survive.

== Release ==
The song is played at the end of the film after Jon Batiste's titular symphony is played by an orchestra at Carnegie Hall . It Never Went Away not only brings the music down from a whole orchestra to a piano, but is also intended to summarize the documented events.

In November 2023, Jon Batiste released the single It Never Went Away.

== Accolades ==
Awards and nominations for "It Never Went Away"
Award	Year	Category	Result	Ref.
Academy Awards	2024	Best Original Song	Nominated	
Black Reel Awards	2024	Outstanding Original Song	Nominated	
Grammy Awards	2025	Best Song Written for Visual Media	Won	
Guild of Music Supervisors Awards	2024	Best Song Written and/or Recording Created for a Film	Nominated	
North Dakota Film Society Awards	2024	Best Original Song	Nominated	
Satellite Awards	2024	Best Original Song	Nominated	
Society of Composers & Lyricists Awards	2024	Outstanding Original Song for a Dramatic or Documentary Visual Media Production	Nominated	
World Soundtrack Awards	2024	Best Original Song	Nominated	
