= Thrive =

Thrive may refer to:

- Thriving

== Music ==
- Thrive (Newsboys album), a 2002 Christian rock album
- Thrive (Casting Crowns album), a 2014 Christian rock album
- Thrive Records, an independent electronic music label

== Other uses ==
- Thrive (film), 2015 short documentary film about Matthew Whitaker
- Thrive Capital, a venture capital firm
- Thrive (website), a personal finance website
- Toshiba Thrive, a tablet computer
- Thrive Global, an American consulting company founded by Arianna Huffington
- Thrive: The Third Metric to Redefining Success and Creating a Life of Well-Being, Wisdom, and Wonder, book by Arianna Huffington
- Thrive Market, American e-commerce food retailer
