= Big Money (album) =

Studio album by Jon Batiste
- Released: August 22, 2025
- Studios: Electric Lady; Sunset Sound; Jon Batiste's home studio; Shangri-La; Blakeslee
- Genres: R&B; Americana; soul; jazz
- Length: 32:27
- Labels: Verve; Interscope
- Producers: Jon Batiste; Mike Elizondo; Mitchell Froom; Kizzo; No I.D.; Lenny Waronker; Nick Waterhouse

Jon Batiste chronology
Beethoven Blues (Batiste Piano Series, Vol. 1) (2024)	Big Money (2025)

Singles from Big Money
- 1. "Big Money" Released: July 11, 2025; 2. "Lonely Avenue" Released: August 1, 2025; 3. "Lean on My Love" Released: August 22, 2025

Big Money is the ninth studio album by American singer Jon Batiste. It was released on August 22, 2025, through Verve Records and Interscope Records. The album features guest appearances by Andra Day, Randy Newman and No I.D.. At the 68th Annual Grammy Awards it received three nominations, winning for Best Americana Album.

To support the album, Batiste embarked on The Big Money Tour: Jon Batiste Plays America on August 27, 2025.

== Background and release ==
Batiste released his seventh studio album, World Music Radio on August 18, 2023. In support of the album Batiste staged his first headlining concert tour, the Uneasy Tour in 2024. On November 15, 2024, Batiste released the first album in his solo piano series Beethoven Blues (Batiste Piano Series, Vol. 1), while working on a new recording album.

Batiste announced the album on July 11, 2025, alongside the release of the title track "Big Money", which features vocals of R&B girl group The Womack Sisters. He revealed that the album was conceived during the Uneasy Tour.

== Critical reception ==
Steven Wine of Associated Press wrote that Batiste "opts for a surprisingly intimate sound" on the album, with "stripped-down, mostly acoustic arrangements create a chill vibe. Simplicity somehow only intensifies the songs’ swing and sway" in which " lyrics about devotion, values, angels and ecology with music that mixes folk and funk, gospel and the blues", praising the duets with Andra Day and Randy Newman.

== Track listing ==
Big Money track listing
No.	Title	Writer(s)	Producer(s)	Length
1.	"Lean on My Love" (featuring Andra Day)	Jon Batiste; Natalie Hemby	Batiste	4:11
2.	"Big Money"	Batiste; Mike Elizondo; Steve McEwan	Batiste; Nick Waterhouse; Elizondo	2:34
3.	"Lonely Avenue" (featuring Randy Newman)	Doc Pomus	Batiste; Mitchell Froom; Lenny Waronker	3:40
4.	"Petrichor"	Batiste	Batiste	2:38
5.	"Do It All Again"	Batiste; Autumn Rowe; Kizzo	Batiste; Kizzo	3:26
6.	"Pinnacle"	Batiste; Waterhouse; Sunny Levine	Batiste; Waterhouse; No I.D.; Levine^{[a]}	4:20
7.	"At All"	Batiste; Waterhouse; Ernest Wilson	Batiste; Waterhouse; No I.D.; Levine^{[a]}	3:17
8.	"Maybe"	Batiste; Wilson	Batiste; No I.D.	5:05
9.	"Angels" (featuring No I.D. and Billy Bob Bo Bob)	Batiste; Wilson	Batiste; No I.D.	3:12
Total length:				32:27

=== Note ===
- ^{^[a]} signifies an additional producer.

== Personnel ==
Credits adapted from the album's liner notes.

=== Musicians ===
- Jon Batiste – vocals (all tracks); synthesizers, Fender Rhodes, bass, Hammond B3 organ, drum machine (track 1); melodica (2, 6, 9), acoustic guitar (2), piano (3, 5, 8); fiddle, mandolin, guitar, drum programming, hand percussion (4); organ, sound design (5); Moog (6), Wurlitzer (7), Farfisa (9)
- Abe Rounds – drum machine, background vocals, drums (1)
- Caleb Arredondo – saxophone, background vocals (1)
- Ebba Dankel – piano, background vocals (1)
- Natalie Hemby – vocals (1)
- Andra Day – vocals (1)
- Nick Waterhouse – acoustic guitar (2), guitar (6, 7), vocals (6)
- Brian Lang – bass (2, 6, 7)
- Josh Adams – drums (2, 6, 7)
- Roberta Freeman – background vocals (2, 6)
- Carol Hatchett – background vocals (2, 6)
- Dillon Casey – guitar (2, 7)
- David Dorame – horns (2)
- Jason Colby – horns (2)
- Jim Jedeikin – horns (2)
- Louis Taylor – horns (2)
- Brit Manor – background vocals (2)
- The Womack Sisters – background vocals (2)
- Randy Newman – vocals (3)
- Nora Germain – violin (5)
- Brandon Rose – bass (5)
- Kizzo – drum programming (5)
- Autumn Rowe – background vocals (5)
- No I.D. – sampler, synthesizer (6); drums, programming (9)
- Pedrum Siadatian – guitar (6)
- Matt Correia – shaker (6)
- Connor "Catfish" Gallaher – guitar (6)
- Billy Bob Bo Bob – background vocals (9)

=== Technical and visuals ===
- Russ Elevado – recording (1), mixing (2, 4, 6, 7, 9)
- Justin Batad – recording (2, 5–9)
- Franky Fox – recording (2, 5, 6)
- Matt Santuro – recording (2, 5)
- David Boucher – recording (3)
- Kaleb Rollins – recording (4, 5), additional engineering (1, 3, 6–9)
- Ian Doerr – recording (6)
- Alex Miller – studio assistance (2, 6), recording assistance (5)
- Will Worden – studio assistance (6)
- Kevin LaReaux – studio assistance (6)
- David Ozinga – studio assistance (6)
- John Kercy – mixing (1)
- Laura Sisk – mixing (3, 5, 8)
- Point Max-Kanga – mix engineering assistance (2)
- Darren Blackensee – mix engineering assistance (2)
- Ruairi O'Flaherty – mastering
- Tom Arndt – production and release coordination
- Eric Neuser – production and release coordination
- Tai Linzie – art coordination
- Walter Thompson Hernández – album cover photography
- Beth Sacca – back cover photography
- Suleika Jaouad – cloud watercolor painting
- Emily J. Snyder – design

== Charts ==
Chart performance for Big Money
Chart (2025)	Peak position
French Jazz Albums (SNEP)	4
French Physical Albums (SNEP)	90
UK Jazz & Blues Albums (Official Charts)	4
US Top Album Sales (Billboard)	11
