= Yola (singer) =

British singer

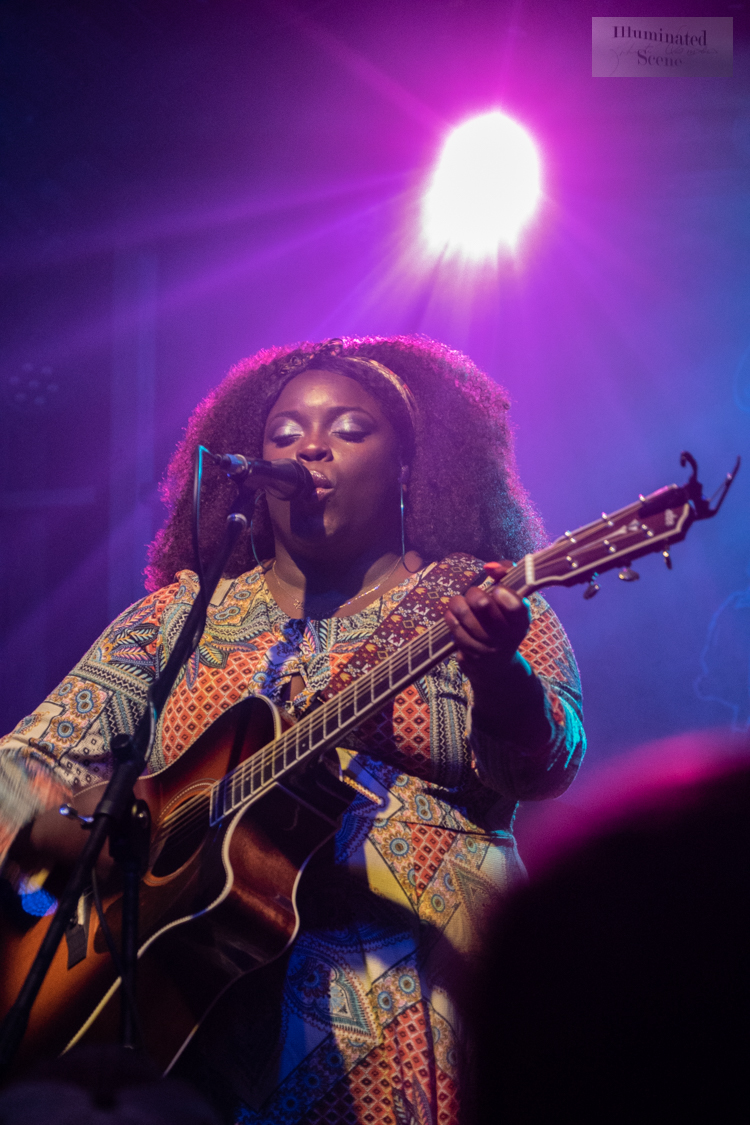
- Yola in 2019

Background information
- Born: Yolanda Claire Quartey; 31 July 1983 (age 43); Bristol, England
- Genres: Country soul; R&B; Americana
- Occupations: Singer; songwriter; musician; actress
- Instruments: Vocals; guitar
- Label: Easy Eye Sound
- Website: www.iamyola.com

Yolanda Claire Quartey (born 31 July 1983), known professionally as Yola or Yola Carter, is a British singer. Her debut studio album Walk Through Fire (2019) received critical acclaim and earned her four Grammy Award nominations, including Best New Artist. Her follow-up, Stand for Myself (2021), received similar acclaim and earned her two more Grammy nominations. Yola made her acting debut in 2022, portraying "the Godmother of rock and roll" Sister Rosetta Tharpe in Baz Luhrman's biopic Elvis, and later made her Broadway debut in 2024 when she began playing Persephone in Anaïs Mitchell's musical Hadestown.

== Early and personal life ==
Yola was born in Bristol, England. Her family tried to discourage her from music at a young age, as they thought it was an unrealistic career option. When Yola was just under 2 her father left her and her mother behind. A single parent struggling to stay afloat, her mother was against Yola's dream to be a singer. When Yola went to grammar school, she had her first taste of freedom and started to pursue music. She later went to university in London and used her student loan to stay afloat while making music. She ended up becoming a university drop out and was evicted due to being unable to pay her rent. Yola was homeless for six months in her 20s and spent a week begging on the streets before getting enough money to travel back to Bristol.

== Career ==
Under her given name Yolanda Quartey, Yola first performed as a guest vocalist and occasional songwriter for British musical acts like Chase & Status and Sub Focus, Massive Attack, Bugz in the Attic, Ginger Wildheart, and Duke Dumont.

Yola decided to launch a solo career after the death of her mother in 2013. She released her first solo EP, Orphan Offering, in 2016. In February 2019, she released her debut album Walk Through Fire on Dan Auerbach's Easy Eye Sound label, to much acclaim. The album title references a fire which damaged Yola's home and she escaped. AllMusic called the album "an extraordinary record, one designed to be part of a grand musical tradition, and it contains enough emotion and imagination to earn its place within that lineage." Brittney McKenna of NPR Music's First Listen declared, "It's the work of an artist sure to stun audiences for years to come." The Wall Street Journal stated, "The album is an introduction to a seasoned, major vocalist that stands to be remembered as a breakthrough."

Walk Through Fire was written, recorded and produced at Dan Auerbach's Easy Eye Studio in Nashville. Auerbach produced the record and assembled an all-star cast for its creation. Most of the songwriting was a collaboration of Yola and Auerbach with contributions from Bobby Wood, Pat McLaughlin and Dan Penn. The team of studio musicians included bassist Dave Roe, harmonica player Charlie McCoy along with former members of the Memphis Boys drummer Gene Crisman and Wood on piano. Additional vocals were contributed by Vince Gill, Molly Tuttle, Ronnie McCoury and Stuart Duncan. The album was recorded and engineered by M. Allen Parker. Auerbach and Parker also mixed the project. In March 2019, Yola made her American television debut on CBS This Morning's Saturday Sessions segment, where she played selections from Walk Through Fire. She, alongside Sheryl Crow, contributed to two tracks on the debut album by The Highwomen.

Yola made a splash at the Newport Folk Festival 2019 with Rolling Stone proclaiming, "Yola became the single most sought-after voice at this year's festival. She played a triumphant side-stage show, served as an unofficial member of The Highwomen, and added her own vocals to performances by everyone from Dolly Parton to Dawes, who let the fast-rising singer take over for the entirety of their 2009 song "When You Call My Name." According to Glide Magazine, "People came from far and wide to hear Yola sing, either because they were enchanted by her excellent release from earlier this year Walk Through Fire, or because word of mouth had reached them that this was not to be missed."

Walk Through Fire generated three Grammy Award nominations. The album was nominated for Best Americana Album and the track "Faraway Look" was nominated for Best American Roots Song and Best American Roots Performance. Additionally, Yola was nominated for Best New Artist.

In February 2020, Variety announced that she had been cast to portray Sister Rosetta Tharpe—"dubbed the Godmother of rock and roll"—in Australian director Baz Luhrmann's film Elvis on the life of Elvis Presley set for release in 2022. In December 2020, she was featured in Ringo Starr's single and video "Here's To The Nights", from his 2021 Zoom In EP.

In July 2021, Yola released her latest album titled Stand for Myself. To celebrate the launch of the album, Yola will commence her 2022 Stand For Myself Tour in Boston in February 2022, with opening performances by Jac Ross and Nick Connors; and in Nashville by Devon Gilfillian and Allison Russell. On 8 October 2021, Yola played a sold-out show at Madison Square Garden when she opened for Chris Stapleton.

On 2 July 2024, Yola made her Broadway debut in Hadestown at the Walter Kerr Theater, playing the role of Persephone. In September of the same year, she released "Future Enemies", her first single in three years, and a subsequent EP entitled "My Way," on S-Curve Records.

In 2026, she was a guest star on children's television in Yo Gabba Gabbaland, season two, where she performed the song, Home.

== Discography ==
=== Studio albums ===
List of studio albums, with selected chart positions and album details
Title	Details	Peak chart positions							
Title	Details	UK	UK Amer.	UK Country	SCO	US	US Folk	US Heat	US Rock
Walk Through Fire	Released: 22 February 2019; Label: Easy Eye Sound, Nonesuch; Format: LP, CD, digital download, streaming	83	1	1	25	–	–	14	–
Stand for Myself	Released: 30 July 2021; Label: Easy Eye Sound, Concord; Format: LP, CD, cassette, 8-track, digital download, streaming	46	1	–	11	196	6	2	39

=== Extended plays ===
Title	Details
Orphan Offering	Released: 1 November 2016; Label: Self-released; Format: CD, digital download, streaming
Apple Music Home Session: Yola	Released: 15 October 2021; Label: Easy Eye Sound, Concord; Format: Streaming
My Way	Released: 17 January 2025; Label: S-Curve Records; Format: Digital download, streaming

=== Singles ===
==== As lead artist ====
Title	Year	Peak chart positions	Album
Title	Year	US AAA	Album
"I Don't Wanna Lie"	2019	35	Walk Through Fire
"Hold On" (with The Highwomen featuring Sheryl Crow)	2020	—	Non-album singles
"Give the People What They Want" (with PJ Morton)	2020	—	Non-album singles
"Diamond Studded Shoes"	2021	21	Stand for Myself
"Stand for Myself"	2021	—	Stand for Myself
"Future Enemies"	2024	—	My Way (EP)

==== As featured artist ====
Title	Year	Peak chart positions	Album
Title	Year	UK	Album
"Highwomen"	2019	—	The Highwomen
"Stop Crying Your Heart Out" (as BBC Radio 2's Allstars)	2020	7	Non-album single

== Awards and nominations ==
Year	Association	Award	Nominated work	Result	Ref.
2017	UK Americana Awards	UK Artist of the Year	Herself	Won	
2019	Americana Music Honors & Awards	Emerging Artist of the Year	Herself	Nominated	
2019	Americana Music Honors & Awards	Album of the Year	Walk Through Fire	Nominated	
2020	62nd Grammy Awards	Best New Artist	Herself	Nominated	
2020	62nd Grammy Awards	Best Americana Album	Walk Through Fire	Nominated	
2020	62nd Grammy Awards	Best American Roots Performance	"Faraway Look"	Nominated	
2020	62nd Grammy Awards	Best American Roots Song	"Faraway Look"	Nominated	
2020	Americana Music Honors & Awards	Artist of the Year	Herself	Nominated	
2020	UK Americana Awards	UK Artist of the Year	Herself	Won	
2020	UK Americana Awards	UK Album of the Year	Walk Through Fire	Won	
2021	Country Music Association Awards	International Achievement Award	Herself	Nominated	
2022	64th Grammy Awards	Best Americana Album	Stand for Myself	Nominated	
2022	64th Grammy Awards	Best American Roots Song	"Diamond Studded Shoes"	Nominated	
2022	UK Americana Awards	UK Artist of the Year	Herself	Won	
2022	UK Americana Awards	UK Album of the Year	Stand for Myself	Won	
