= Walk Through Fire (Yola album) =

Studio album by Yola
- Released: February 22, 2019
- Studio: Easy Eye Sound (Nashville)
- Genre: Country; R&B; pop
- Label: Easy Eye Sound; Nonesuch
- Producer: Dan Auerbach

Yola chronology
| Orphan Offering (2016) | Walk Through Fire (2019) | Stand for Myself (2021) |

Walk Through Fire is the debut album by Yola. It was released on February 22, 2019, on Dan Auerbach's Easy Eye Sound label and distributed by Nonesuch Records. The album's title references both a fire which damaged Yola's home and an abusive relationship from which she escaped.

A deluxe edition of Walk Through Fire was released on December 6, 2019, which includes two previously unreleased tracks, including a cover of Elton John's "Goodbye Yellow Brick Road". Elton John premiered the video via his official Twitter account and has been a vocal cheerleader of Yola.

Walk Through Fire was nominated for the Grammy Award for Best Americana Album and album track "Faraway Look" was nominated for Best American Roots Song and Best American Roots Performance, with Yola herself also being nominated for Best New Artist. Additionally the album also received a nomination for Album of the Year at the Americana Music Honors & Awards and won UK Album of the Year award at the UK Americana Awards.The Tennessean also named "Walk Through Fire" to its list of "25 Essential Nashville albums of the 2010s".

== Production ==
Walk Through Fire was written, recorded and produced at Dan Auerbach's Easy Eye Studio in Nashville. Auerbach produced the record and assembled an all-star cast for its creation. Most of the songwriting was a collaboration of Yola and Auerbach with contributions from Bobby Wood, Pat McLaughlin and Dan Penn. The team of studio musicians included bassist Dave Roe, harmonica player Charlie McCoy along with former members of the Memphis Boys drummer Gene Crisman and Wood on piano. Additional vocals were contributed by Vince Gill, Molly Tuttle, Ronnie McCoury and Stuart Duncan. The album was recorded and engineered by M. Allen Parker. Auerbach and Parker also mixed the project.

== Critical reception and recognition ==
Professional ratings
Aggregate scores
| Source | Rating |
|---|---|
| Metacritic | 85/100 |
Review scores
| Source | Rating |
| AllMusic | 4/5 stars |
| American Songwriter | 4.5/5 stars |
| The Guardian | 3/5 stars |
| PopMatters | 9/10 |
| Slant | 3.5/5 stars |

Walk Through Fire received critical acclaim from music critics. At Metacritic, the album received an average score of 85/100. AllMusic called the album "an extraordinary record, one designed to be part of a grand musical tradition, and it contains enough emotion and imagination to earn its place within that lineage." Brittney McKenna of NPR Music's First Listen declared, "It's the work of an artist sure to stun audiences for years to come." The Wall Street Journal stated, "The album is an introduction to a seasoned, major vocalist that stands to be remembered as a breakthrough."

The album was listed as 48th in Rolling Stone's list of "The 50 Best of Album of 2019" and third in their "40 Best Country and Americana Albums of 2019".

== Track listing ==
1. "Faraway Look" (Yola, Dan Auerbach, Pat McLaughlin) – 3:10
2. "Shady Grove" (Yola, Auerbach, Bobby Wood) – 2:43
3. "Ride Out in the Country" (Yola, Auerbach, Joe Allen) – 3:15
4. "It Ain't Easier" (Yola) – 4:24
5. "Walk Through Fire" (Dan Penn, Yola, Auerbach) – 3:48
6. "Rock Me Gently" (Yola, Auerbach, Allen) – 3:30
7. "Love All Night (Work All Day)" (Yola, Auerbach, Wood) – 3:33
8. "Deep Blue Dream" (Yola, Auerbach, McLaughlin) – 2:13
9. "Lonely the Night" (Yola, Auerbach, John Bettis) – 4:43
10. "Still Gone" featuring Vince Gill (Yola, Auerbach, Roger Cook, Wood) – 3:00
11. "Keep Me Here" (Yola, Auerbach, Wood) – 3:40
12. "Love Is Light" (Yola, Auerbach, Wood) – 3:16

Deluxe Edition bonus tracks

1. "I Don't Wanna Lie" (Wood) – 3:02
2. "Goodbye Yellow Brick Road" (Elton John, Bernie Taupin) – 3:24

== Charts ==
Chart performance for Walk Through Fire
| Chart (2019) | Peak position |
|---|---|
| UK Albums (OCC) | 83 |
| UK Americana Albums (OCC) | 1 |
| UK Country Artists Albums (OCC) | 1 |
| Scottish Albums Chart (OCC) | 18 |
