= Stand for Myself =

Studio album by Yola
- Released: 30 July 2021
- Studio: Easy Eye Sound, Nashville, Tennessee
- Genre: Americana; country-soul; pop
- Length: 46:18
- Label: Easy Eye Sound; Concord
- Producer: Dan Auerbach

Yola chronology
Walk Through Fire (2019)	Stand for Myself (2021)

Singles from Stand for Myself
- 1. "Diamond Studded Shoes" Released: 22 April 2021; 2. "Stand for Myself" Released: 27 May 2021

Stand for Myself is the second studio album by English singer and songwriter Yola. It was released on 30 July 2021, through Easy Eye Sound and distributed by Concord Records. The album debuted at number 196 on the Billboard 200 chart and at number 46 on the UK Albums Chart chart, being her first entry on both charts. The album was nominated for Best Americana Album at the 2022 Grammy Awards.

== Background ==
The album features various songs that Yola was trying to finish over the years. Recording took place in Nashville, where Yola had to locate permanently after the COVID-19 pandemic. Like her previous album, Dan Auerbach, guitarist and vocalist of the Black Keys, served as producer while songwriters such as Natalie Hemby, Liz Rose, Ruby Amanfu and Joy Oladokun also collaborated on the album.

== Promotion and release ==
On 22 April 2021, "Diamond Studded Shoes" was released as the album's first single, a music video for the song directed by Kwaku Otchere was released the same day. On 27 May 2021, "Stand for Myself", the album's title track, was released as the second single. It was also performed on 21 July 2021, on The Late Show with Stephen Colbert.

== Critical reception ==
Professional ratings
Aggregate scores
Source	Rating
AnyDecentMusic?	7.5/10
Metacritic	82/100
Review scores
Source	Rating
AllMusic	4/5 stars
Mojo	4/5 stars
musicOMH	4/5 stars
The Observer	3/5 stars
Paste	8.7/10
Pitchfork	7.4/10
PopMatters	8/10
Rolling Stone	4/5 stars
Uncut	8/10
Under the Radar	7.5/10

Stand for Myself was met with widespread critical acclaim. At Metacritic, which assigns a normalized rating out of 100 to reviews from professional publications, the album received an average score of 82, based on 11 reviews. Aggregator AnyDecentMusic? gave it 7.5 out of 10, based on their assessment of the critical consensus.

Reviewing the album for AllMusic, Timothy Monger called the album "a fully present and vital collection of timely emotions and timeless arrangements" commenting that the album "is a stunner with plenty of emotional firepower, but it can also feel soft as a wool blanket". Steve Horowitz of PopMatters said, "The dozen tracks here showcase the range of her talents as a singer and a songwriter and that of a human being who refuses to accept life's limitations and stand up for herself". Charles Waring of Mojo praised Yola's "caressing vocals", calling the album an "enthralling step on her musical voyage". Reviewing the album for Uncut, Stephen Deusner wrote that Yola emphasises "the nuance in her voice" on the Stand for Myself, which he called "lovingly written, arranged and produced". Writing for musicOMH, Graeme Marsh stated, "The vocals here are telling; it's effortlessly stunning, grabbing attention with how easily she achieves something countless others spend years chasing". Austin Saalman from Under the Radar enjoyed the album, saying, "Stand For Myself hangs together more cohesively than Walk Through Fire, feeling more urgent and existing upon a grander scale than its predecessor".

Writing for Paste, Andy Crump described the album as "triumphant" and claimed that "it's frank and fresh in its fashion, carrying darkness and unguarded emotions on crests of S-tier artistry". Maura Johnston from Pitchfork gave the album a 7.4 out of ten writing that the album "isn't a record defined by genre as much as it is by Yola's spirit, which transforms her matter-of-fact assertions of personhood into amphitheater-ready anthems". Kitty Empire from The Observer gave the album three out of five stars mentioning on the "eclectic inspirations" of the album.

=== Year-end lists ===
Select year-end rankings of Stand for Myself
Publication	List	Rank	Ref.
Consequence	Top 50 Albums of 2021	47	
PopMatters	The 75 Best Albums of 2021	44	
Rolling Stone	The 50 Best Albums of 2021	38	

=== Industry awards ===
Awards and nominations for Stand for Myself
Year	Ceremony	Category	Result	Ref.
2022	Grammy Awards	Best Americana Album	Nominated	

== Track listing ==
All tracks are produced by Dan Auerbach.

Stand for Myself track listing
No.	Title	Writer(s)	Length
1.	"Barely Alive"	Yola; Dan Auerbach; Joy Oladokun	3:36
2.	"Dancing Away in Tears"	Yola; Auerbach; Natalie Hemby	3:48
3.	"Diamond Studded Shoes"	Yola; Auerbach; Hemby; Aaron Lee Tasjan	3:24
4.	"Be My Friend"	Yola; Auerbach; Ruby Amanfu	3:28
5.	"Great Divide"	Yola; Auerbach; Paul Overstreet	3:36
6.	"Starlight"	Yola; Auerbach; Bobby Wood	4:02
7.	"If I Had to Do It All Again"	Yola; Auerbach; Hemby	3:46
8.	"Now You're Here"	Yola; Auerbach; Hemby	4:08
9.	"Whatever You Want"	Yola; Auerbach; John Bettis	3:51
10.	"Break the Bough"	Yola; Auerbach; Liz Rose	3:20
11.	"Like a Photograph"	Yola; Auerbach; Patrick James McLaughlin	5:02
12.	"Stand for Myself"	Yola; Auerbach; Hemby; Hannah Vasanth	4:13
Total length:			46:18

== Personnel ==
Credits adapted from the album's liner notes and Tidal.

Musicians

- Yola – vocals
- Andy Gabbard – background vocals (1–3, 5, 7, 8, 10, 11)
- Nick Movshon – bass guitar
- Mike Rojas – clavichord (1–3), glockenspiel, vibraphone (1, 2, 6, 11); piano (2–12), synthesizer (2), organ (9), harpsichord (12)
- Aaron Frazer – drums
- Tom Bukovac – electric guitar (1–11), acoustic guitar (2, 3, 8, 9, 11, 12)
- Russ Pahl – electric guitar (1–5, 7–12), bass guitar (2), steel guitar (3), acoustic guitar (4, 6, 7)
- Billy Sanford – electric guitar (1–10, 12), acoustic guitar (11)
- Ray Jacildo – glockenspiel, vibraphone (1, 2, 6, 11);, organ (1–3, 5–9, 11, 12), Mellotron (4), harpsichord (6), synthesizer (7), piano (10)
- Sam Bacco – percussion
- Dan Auerbach – percussion (1, 6), electric guitar (2–7, 9, 10, 12), background vocals (7)
- Ashley Wilcoxson – background vocals (2, 5, 6)
- Raymond Mason – horn (2, 8, 10)
- Bobby Wood – piano (2–12)
- Matt Combs – strings (2, 6, 7, 11)
- Brandi Carlile – background vocals (4)
- Dan Dugmore – steel guitar (4, 9, 11)
- Alfreda McCrary – background vocals (8, 9, 12)
- Ann McCrary – background vocals (8, 9, 12)
- Regina McCrary – background vocals (8, 9, 12)

Technical

- Dan Auerbach – producer, recording producer, mixer
- M. Allen Parker – mixer, recording engineer
- Alan Silverman – mastering engineer (1, 3–6, 8–11)
- Ryan Smith – mastering engineer (2, 7)
- Caleb VanBuskirk – engineer
- Josh Ditty – engineer
- Trey Keller – engineer
- Mickey Smay – assistant recording engineer
- Tyler Zwiep – assistant recording engineer

== Charts ==
Chart performance for Stand for Myself
Chart (2021)	Peak position
Scottish Albums (OCC)	11
UK Albums (OCC)	46
UK Americana Albums (OCC)	1
US Billboard 200	196
US Top Rock Albums (Billboard)	39
