= Thrive (film) =

Thrive is a 2015 short documentary film about Matthew Whitaker, a piano prodigy who has been blind since birth. The film was directed and produced by Paul Szynol and has played at festivals worldwide, including North America, Europe, and Asia. The film includes appearances by Jonathan Batiste, Dr Lonnie Smith, and Chad Smith.
