= Grammy Award for Best Americana Album =

Award category

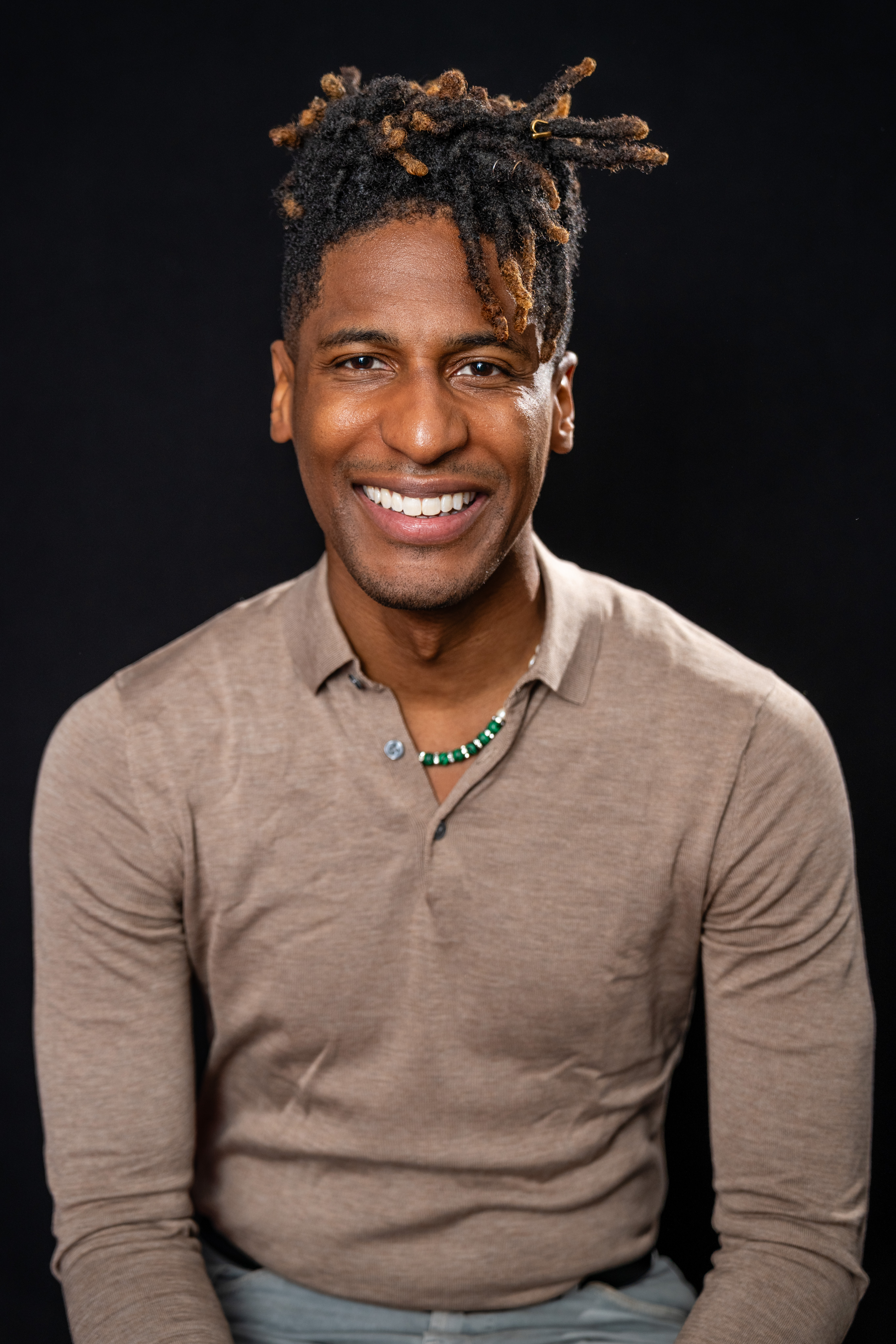
- Big Money by Jon Batiste is the most recent recipient.
- Awarded for: quality Americana albums
- Country: United States
- Presented by: National Academy of Recording Arts and Sciences
- First award: 2010
- Currently held by: Jon Batiste – Big Money (2026)
- Website: grammy.com

The Grammy Award for Best Americana Album is an honor presented to recording artists for quality albums in the Americana music genre at the Grammy Awards, a ceremony that was established in 1958 and originally called the Gramophone Awards. Honors in several categories are presented at the ceremony annually by the National Academy of Recording Arts and Sciences of the United States to "honor artistic achievement, technical proficiency and overall excellence in the recording industry, without regard to album sales or chart position".

In 2009, the Academy announced that the award for Best Contemporary Folk/Americana Album would be split into two separate categories: Best Contemporary Folk Album and Best Americana Album. The distinction between the two award categories is based on the use of acoustic versus electric instruments; acoustic instruments predominate in "contemporary folk" and electric instruments are characteristic of Americana. Jed Hilly, executive director of the Americana Music Association, called the new category's inclusion "a huge acknowledgment" of the music genre. Hilly admitted to working hard at convincing the Academy to include Americana as its own category. The music industry had been using the term "Americana music" for about 15 years before the new award was created. Following is the award's purpose, according to the category description guide from the 2018 Grammy Awards:

Americana is contemporary music that incorporates elements of various American roots music and vocal styles, including country, roots-rock, folk, bluegrass, R&B and blues, resulting in a distinctive roots-oriented sound that lives in a world apart from the pure forms of the genres upon which it may draw. While acoustic instruments are often present and vital, Americana also often uses a full electric band.

The award was first presented in 2010 to Levon Helm at the 52nd Grammy Awards for the album Electric Dirt. Lucinda Williams is the artist with most nominations (three) without a win (see below for a table with artists with most wins and nominations).

== Recipients ==
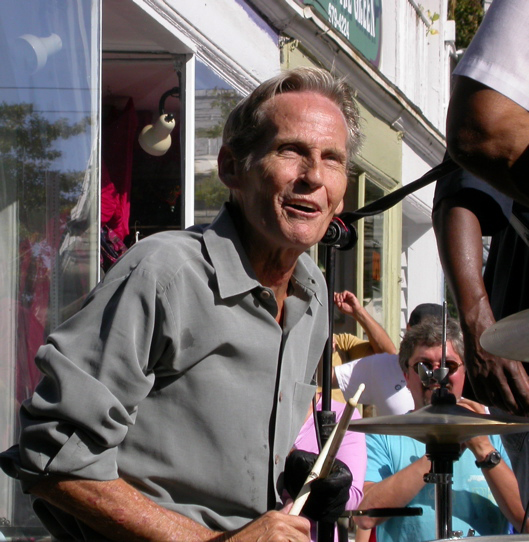
2010 and 2012 award recipient Levon Helm performing in 2004

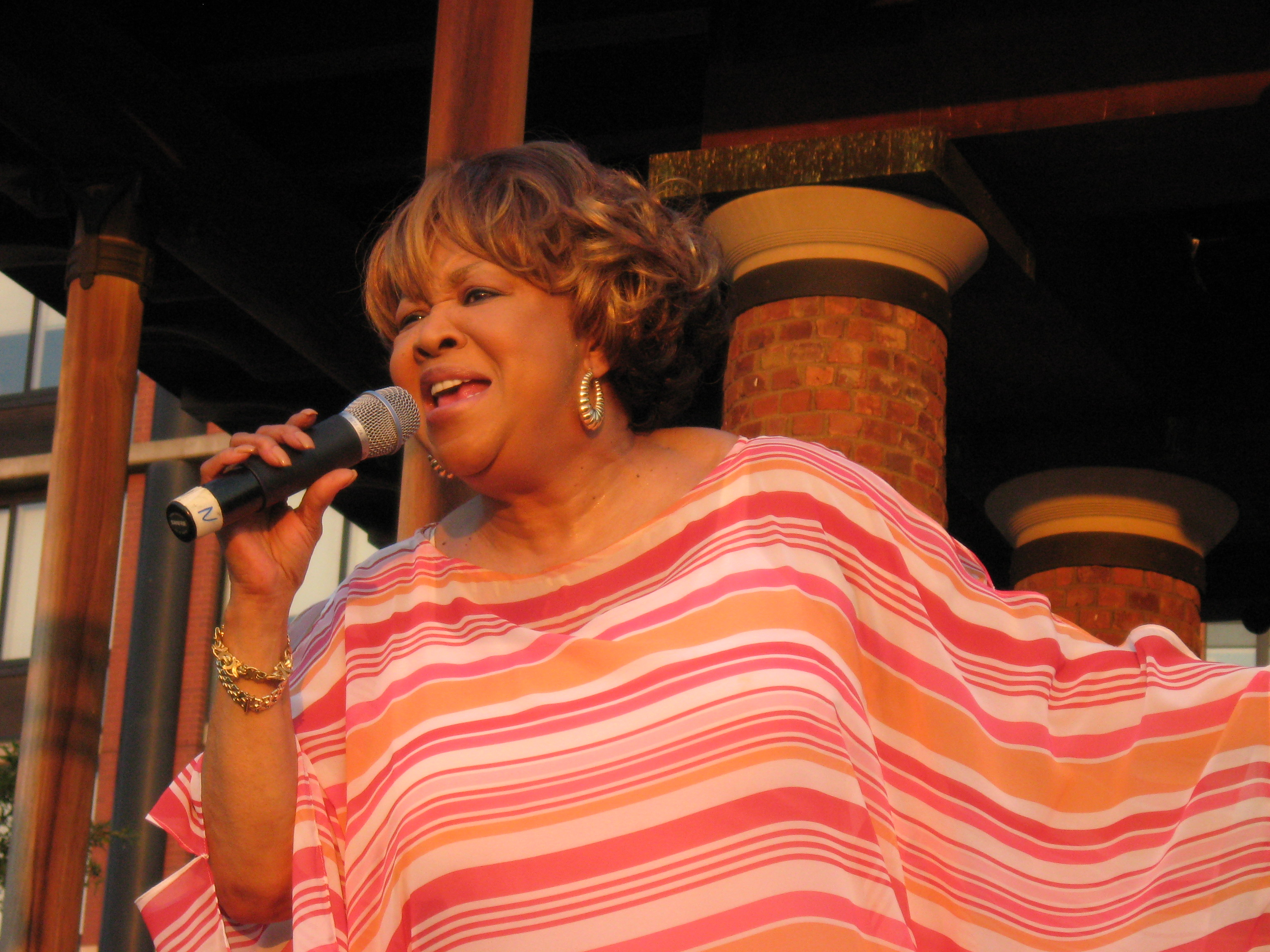
Mavis Staples received the award in 2011

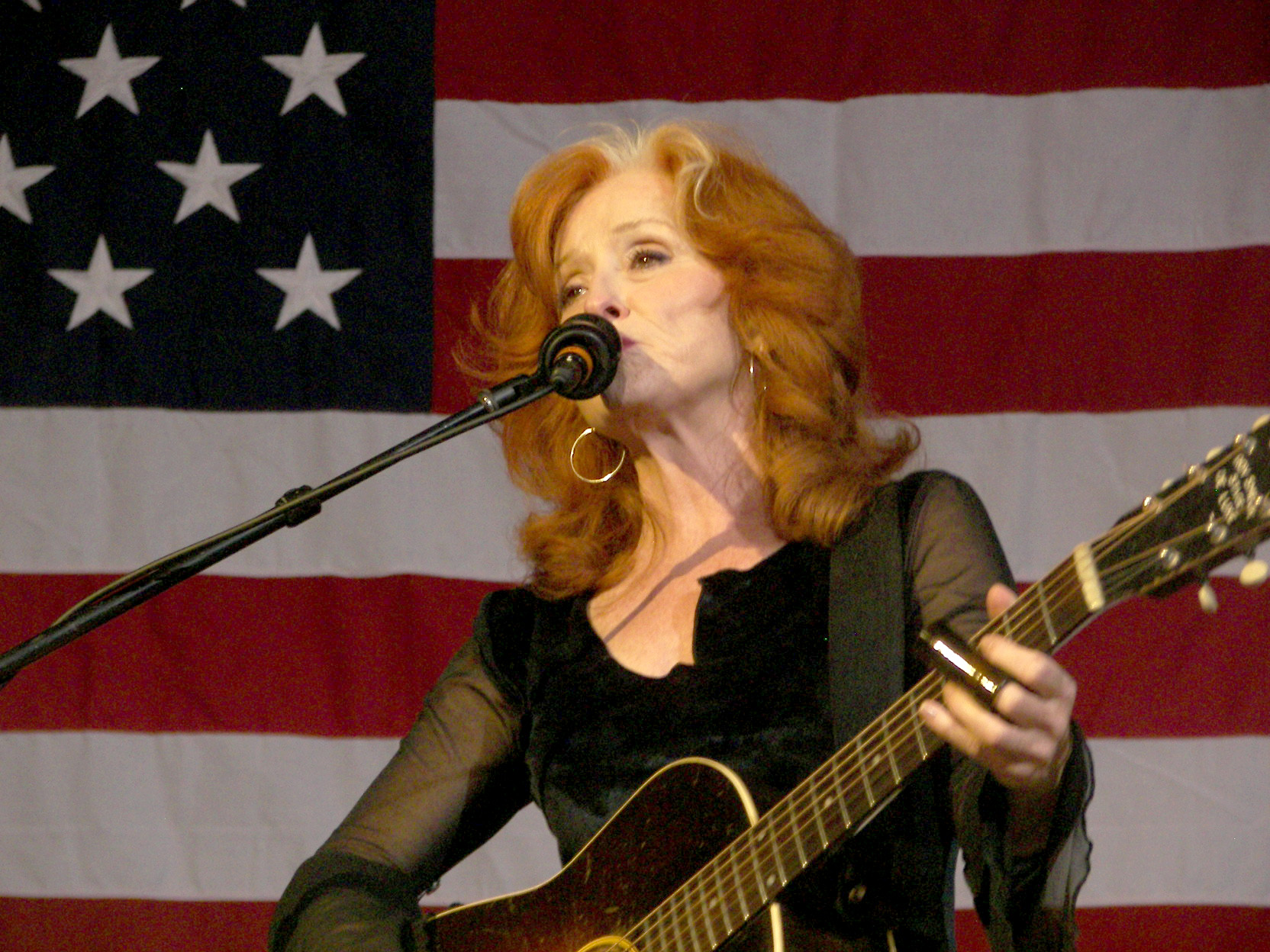
2013 recipient Bonnie Raitt

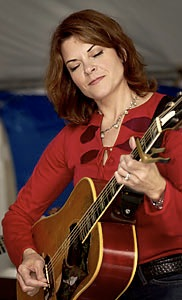
2015 honoree Rosanne Cash

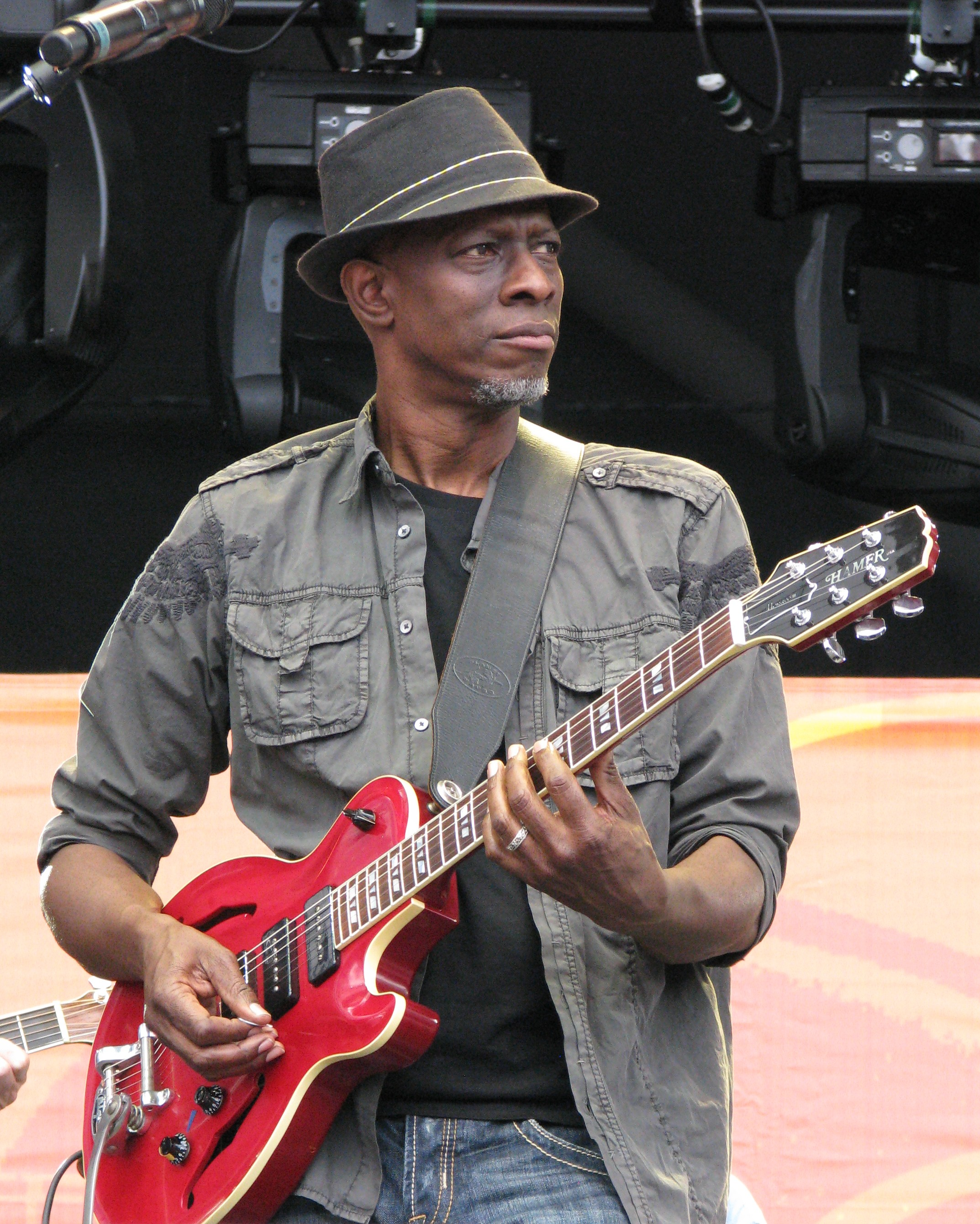
Keb' Mo' received the award in 2020

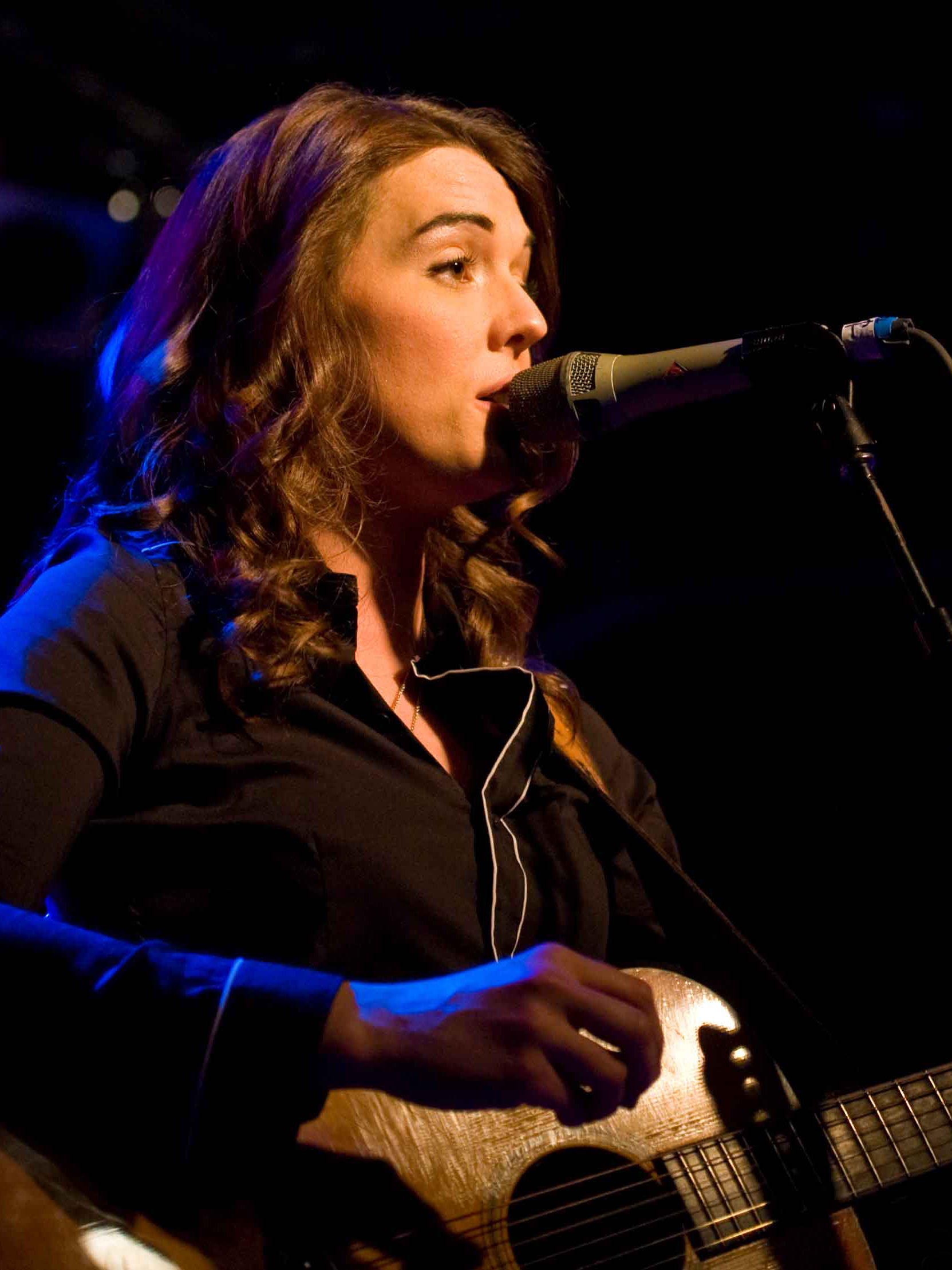
Two-time winner Brandi Carlile

=== 2010s ===
Year	Work	Artist
2010
2010	Electric Dirt	Levon Helm
2010	Little Honey	Lucinda Williams
2010	Together Through Life	Bob Dylan
2010	Wilco (The Album)	Wilco
2010	Willie and the Wheel	Willie Nelson and Asleep at the Wheel
2011
2011	You Are Not Alone	Mavis Staples
2011	Band of Joy	Robert Plant
2011	Country Music	Willie Nelson
2011	The List	Rosanne Cash
2011	Tin Can Trust	Los Lobos
2012
2012	Ramble at the Ryman	Levon Helm
2012	Blessed	Lucinda Williams
2012	Emotional Jukebox	Linda Chorney
2012	Hard Bargain	Emmylou Harris
2012	Pull Up Some Dust and Sit Down	Ry Cooder
2013
2013	Slipstream	Bonnie Raitt
2013	Babel	Mumford & Sons
2013	The Carpenter	The Avett Brothers
2013	From the Ground Up	John Fullbright
2013	The Lumineers	The Lumineers
2014
2014	Old Yellow Moon	Emmylou Harris and Rodney Crowell
2014	Buddy and Jim	Buddy Miller and Jim Lauderdale
2014	Love Has Come for You	Steve Martin and Edie Brickell
2014	One True Vine	Mavis Staples
2014	Songbook	Allen Toussaint
2015
2015	The River & the Thread	Rosanne Cash
2015	BLUESAmericana	Keb' Mo'
2015	A Dotted Line	Nickel Creek
2015	Metamodern Sounds in Country Music	Sturgill Simpson
2015	Terms of My Surrender	John Hiatt
2016
2016	Something More Than Free	Jason Isbell
2016	The Firewatcher's Daughter	Brandi Carlile
2016	Mono	The Mavericks
2016	The Phosphorescent Blues	Punch Brothers
2016	The Traveling Kind	Emmylou Harris and Rodney Crowell
2017
2017	This Is Where I Live	William Bell
2017	The Bird and the Rifle	Lori McKenna
2017	The Cedar Creek Sessions	Kris Kristofferson
2017	Kid Sister	The Time Jumpers
2017	True Sadness	The Avett Brothers
2018
2018	The Nashville Sound	Jason Isbell and the 400 Unit
2018	Beast Epic	Iron & Wine
2018	Brand New Day	The Mavericks
2018	Shine on Rainy Day	Brent Cobb
2018	Southern Blood	Gregg Allman
2019
2019	By the Way, I Forgive You	Brandi Carlile
2019	The Lonely, the Lonesome & the Gone	Lee Ann Womack
2019	One Drop of Truth	The Wood Brothers
2019	Things Have Changed	Bettye LaVette
2019	The Tree of Forgiveness	John Prine

=== 2020s ===
Year	Work	Artist
2020
2020	Oklahoma	Keb' Mo'
2020	Tales of America	J.S. Ondara
2020	Walk Through Fire	Yola
2020	Who Are You Now	Madison Cunningham
2020	Years to Burn	Calexico and Iron & Wine
2021
2021	World on the Ground	Sarah Jarosz
2021	El Dorado	Marcus King
2021	Good Souls Better Angels	Lucinda Williams
2021	Old Flowers	Courtney Marie Andrews
2021	Terms of Surrender	Hiss Golden Messenger
2022
2022	Native Sons	Los Lobos
2022	Downhill From Everywhere	Jackson Browne
2022	Leftover Feelings	John Hiatt and the Jerry Douglas Band
2022	Outside Child	Allison Russell
2022	Stand for Myself	Yola
2023
2023	In These Silent Days	Brandi Carlile
2023	Good to Be...	Keb' Mo'
2023	Just Like That...	Bonnie Raitt
2023	Raise the Roof	Robert Plant and Alison Krauss
2023	Things Happen That Way	Dr. John
2024
2024	Weathervanes	Jason Isbell & the 400 Unit
2024	Brandy Clark	Brandy Clark
2024	The Chicago Sessions	Rodney Crowell
2024	The Returner	Allison Russell
2024	You're the One	Rhiannon Giddens
2025
2025	Trail of Flowers	Sierra Ferrell
2025	No One Gets Out Alive	Maggie Rose
2025	The Other Side	T Bone Burnett
2025	Polaroid Lovers	Sarah Jarosz
2025	$10 Cowboy	Charley Crockett
2025	Tigers Blood	Waxahatchee
2026
2026	Big Money	Jon Batiste
2026	Bloom	Larkin Poe
2026	Last Leaf on the Tree	Willie Nelson
2026	Middle	Jesse Welles
2026	So Long Little Miss Sunshine	Molly Tuttle
2027
2027	Future Soul	Tedeschi Trucks Band
2027	Masks Off	Jesse Welles
2027	Returning to Myself	Brandi Carlile
2027	Sad and Beautiful World	Mavis Staples
2027	World's Gone Wrong	Lucinda Williams

== Artists with multiple wins ==
3 wins

- Jason Isbell

2 wins

- Brandi Carlile
- Levon Helm

== Artists with multiple nominations ==
4 nominations

- Brandi Carlile
- Lucinda Williams

3 nominations

- Rodney Crowell
- Emmylou Harris
- Jason Isbell
- Keb' Mo'
- Willie Nelson
- Mavis Staples

2 nominations

- The Avett Brothers
- Rosanne Cash
- Levon Helm
- John Hiatt
- Iron & Wine
- The Mavericks
- Robert Plant
- Bonnie Raitt
- Allison Russell
- Jesse Welles
- Yola

== See also ==
- Americana Music Association
- Heartland rock
- List of Grammy Award categories
- Roots rock
