= Jon Batiste =

American musician (born 1986)

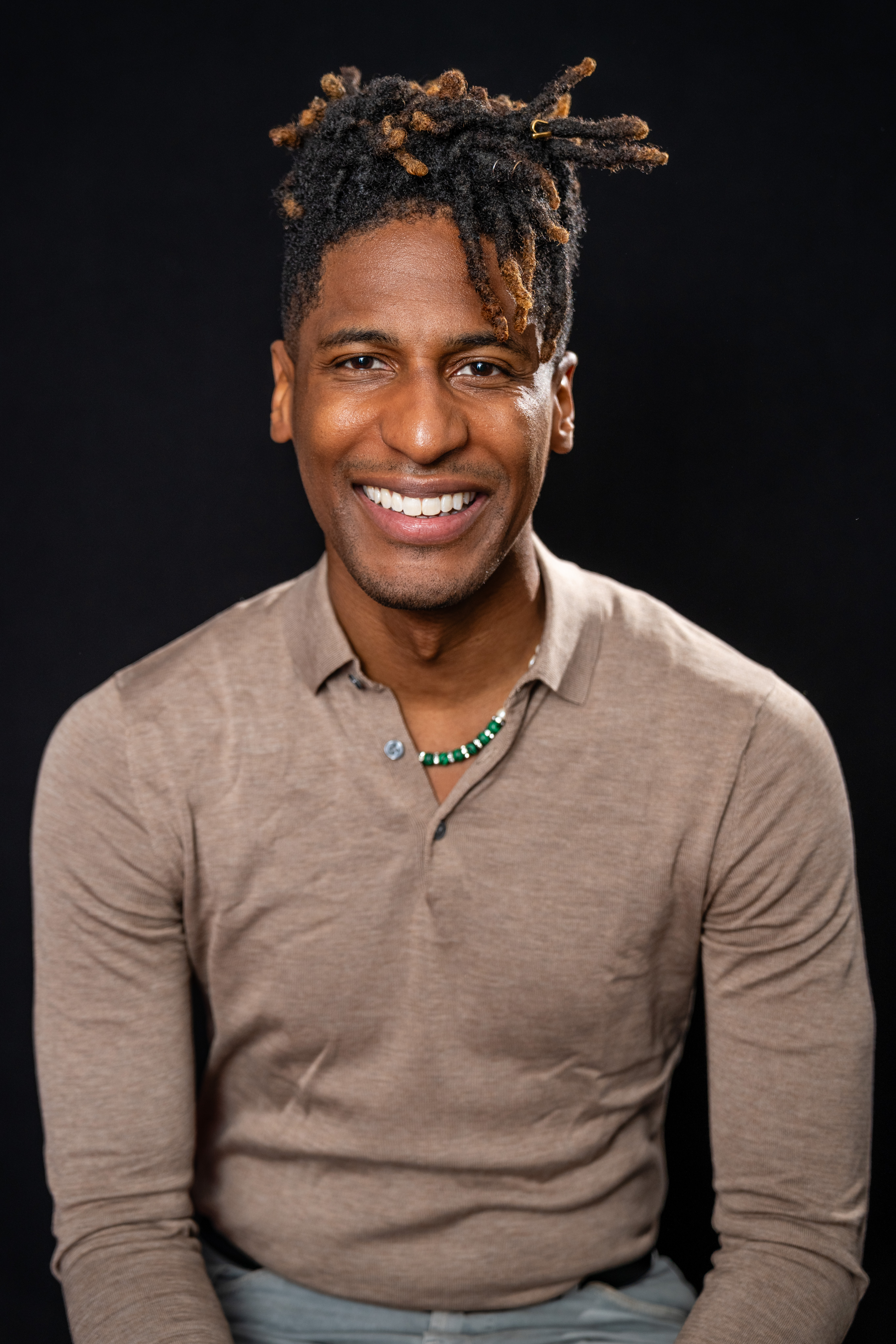
- Batiste in 2023

Background information
- Born: Jonathan Michael Batiste; November 11, 1986 (age 40); Metairie, Louisiana, U.S.
- Education: Juilliard School (BM, MMus)
- Genres: Americana; jazz; R&B; soul; rock; hip hop; pop; funk; blues; classical; film score
- Occupations: Musician; songwriter; record producer; bandleader; television personality; actor
- Instruments: Vocals; piano; keyboards; guitar; melodica; percussion
- Years active: 1998–present
- Labels: Naht Jona; Razor & Tie; Concord; Verve; M.O.D. Technologies; Blue Engine; Tiger Turn; Walt Disney
- Formerly of: Stay Human
- Spouse: Suleika Jaouad (m. 2022)
- Website: Jon Batiste

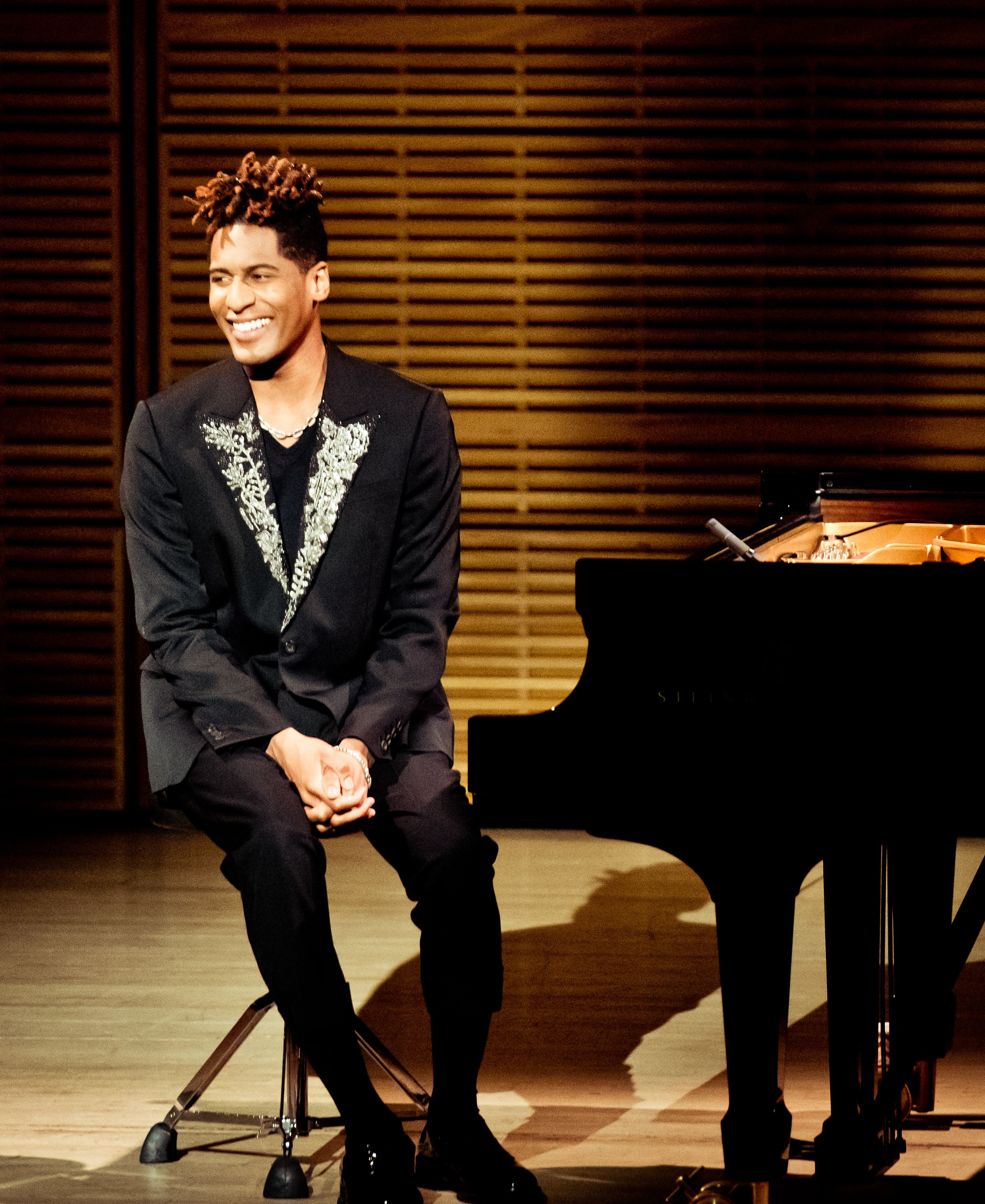
Batiste at Carnegie Hall

Jonathan Michael Batiste (born November 11, 1986) is an American musician, songwriter, record producer, bandleader, television personality and actor. He has recorded and performed with artists including Alicia Keys, Stevie Wonder, Prince, Willie Nelson, Doja Cat, Lenny Kravitz, ASAP Rocky, Ed Sheeran, Lana Del Rey, Roy Hargrove, Juvenile, Mavis Staples, and Lauryn Hill. Batiste appeared nightly with his band, Stay Human, as bandleader and musical director on The Late Show with Stephen Colbert from 2015 to 2022.

Batiste also serves as the music director of The Atlantic and the Creative Director of the National Jazz Museum in Harlem. In 2020, he co-composed the score for the Pixar animated film Soul, for which he received an Academy Award, a Golden Globe Award, a Grammy Award and a BAFTA Film Award (all shared with co-composers Trent Reznor and Atticus Ross). Batiste has garnered eight Grammy Awards from 25 nominations, including an Album of the Year win for We Are (2021).

In 2023, Batiste was featured in the documentary film American Symphony, which records the process of Batiste composing his first symphony. In 2024, Batiste featured in the ensemble comedy-drama film Saturday Night, directed by Jason Reitman, playing the role of musician Billy Preston, as well as composing the film's score.

== Early life and education ==
Jon Batiste was born in Metairie, Louisiana, to a Catholic family. He grew up in Kenner, Louisiana. Batiste is a member of a New Orleans musical dynasty, the Batiste family, that includes Lionel Batiste of the Treme Brass Band, Milton Batiste of the Olympia Brass Band, and Russell Batiste Jr. At the age of eight, he played percussion and drums with his family's band, the Batiste Brothers Band. At the age of 11, at his mother's suggestion, he switched to piano and took classical piano lessons from local teacher Shirley Herstein every Saturday for seven years. Batiste further developed his piano skills by transcribing songs from video games such as Street Fighter Alpha, Final Fantasy VII and Sonic the Hedgehog.

At 17, Batiste released his debut album, Times in New Orleans. He attended St. Augustine High School and New Orleans Center for Creative Arts with Trombone Shorty in New Orleans and graduated in 2004. He then went on to attend the Juilliard School, receiving a Bachelor of Music in 2008 and a Master of Music in 2011, both in jazz studies. He studied with William Daghlian there. While at Juilliard, he released his second album, Live in New York: At the Rubin Museum of Art. By the end of 2006, Batiste had been a featured performer in South Africa, London, Lisbon, Spain, Paris, and the United States.

== Career ==
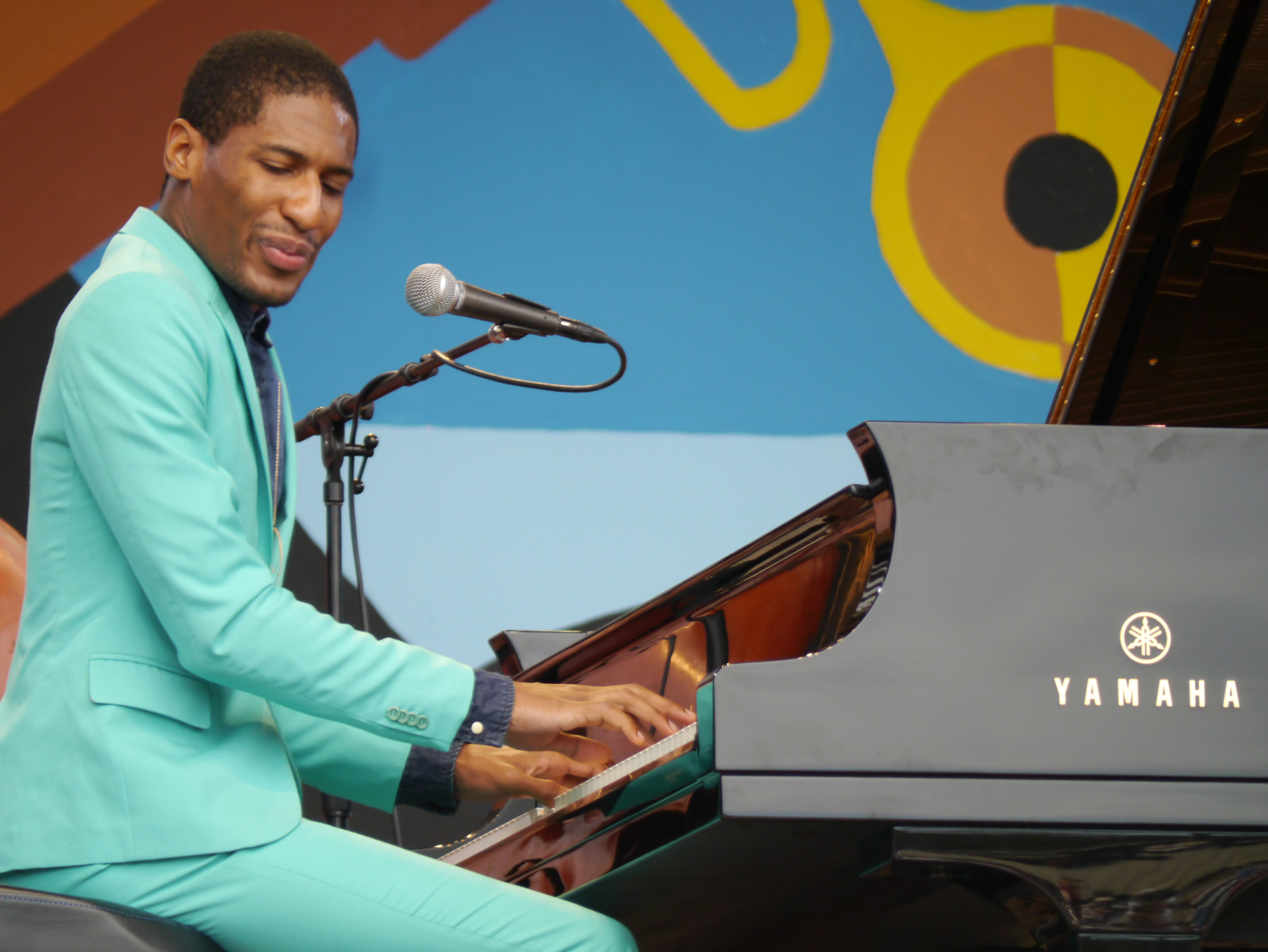
Batiste plays at the 2014 Monterey Jazz Festival

=== Early years ===
In 2007, at the age of 20, Batiste made his debut at the Concertgebouw, in Amsterdam, producing and performing his own show. He conducted music clinics, classes, and workshops throughout the Netherlands in inner-city schools and underprivileged neighborhoods. He was invited to Carnegie Hall to produce and perform in his own show, with six young musicians from the Netherlands. The performance concluded with a finale he composed for choir, jazz combo and orchestral instruments. In the following years, Batiste released a number of music projects, including Social Music (2013), which spent over a month at the top of the Billboard and iTunes jazz charts; The Late Show EP (2016) with Stay Human; and a holiday album, Christmas with Jon Batiste (2016). In 2017, he released the singles "Ohio" with Leon Bridges and Gary Clark Jr., as well as "Battle Hymn of the Republic" for The Atlantic. Batiste's cover of "St. James Infirmary Blues" was nominated for a Grammy in 2019, in the category of Best American Roots Performance. Batiste's debut solo album, Hollywood Africans, was released by Verve Records in September 2018. "Don't Stop" served as the lead single. Leading up to the album release, he completed a Summer Festival tour across the U.S. with the Dap-Kings.

Batiste's career performances include a tribute to Chuck Berry and Fats Domino during the 60th annual Grammy Awards (performing alongside Gary Clark Jr.); the Kennedy Center Honors' tribute to Carmen De Lavallade; the Concert for Peace and Justice in Montgomery, Alabama; the National Anthem at the 2017 NBA All Star Game; and Opening Night of the 2017 US Open. He has curated the Global Citizen Advocacy Concert with Tom Morello and the Louis Armstrong Wonderful World Festival in Queens, N.Y.

Batiste was cast in the HBO television series Treme, appearing as himself in seasons 2, 3, and 4. He was also cast as T.K. Hazelton in director Spike Lee's film, Red Hook Summer, and he composed and performed the Hammond B-3 organ music that was a part of the film score. Other film scores composed by Batiste include the television documentary Duke 91 & 92: Back to Back and the short film Melody of Choice. He also appears in the films Da Sweet Blood of Jesus (2014) by Spike Lee and Thrive (2015) by Paul Szynol.

=== 2005-2014: Stay Human ===
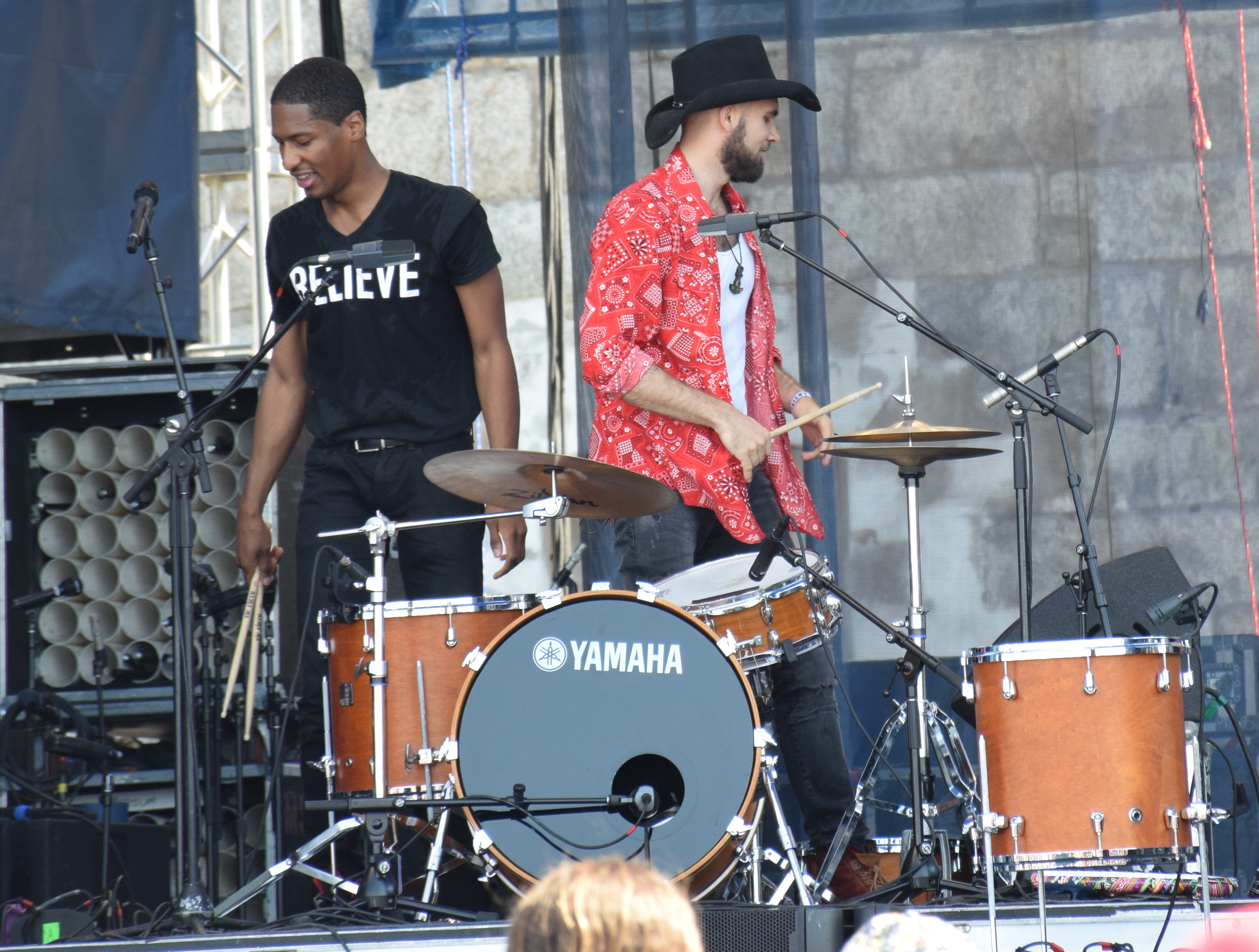
Jon Batiste and Stay Human perform at the 2015 Newport Jazz Festival

In 2005, Batiste began performing regularly in New York with his Juilliard peers, bassist Phil Kuehn and drummer Joe Saylor. He later added Eddie Barbash on alto saxophone and Ibanda Ruhumbika on tuba. Batiste named the band Stay Human, which draws its moniker from the belief that human interaction during a live musical performance can uplift humanity in the midst of the "plug in, tune out" nature of modern society. The band leads impromptu street performances, which Batiste calls "love riots". Notable artists were often seen accompanying Batiste, including Wynton Marsalis.

In 2011, Stay Human released the album MY N.Y., which was recorded in its entirety on New York City Subway trains, an idea that came to Batiste after questioning how to connect with people.

On April 22, 2017, the band played for the March for Science rally at the Washington Monument in Washington, D.C.

In 2014, Batiste and Stay Human appeared on The Colbert Report to perform the group's single, "Express Yourself", written and produced with Austin Bis.

=== 2015-2026: The Late Show with Stephen Colbert ===
On June 4, 2015, it was announced that Jon Batiste and Stay Human would serve as the house band on The Late Show with Stephen Colbert. The show premiered on CBS on September 8, 2015. On the show, Batiste and Stay Human have performed alongside Billy Joel, Will Smith, Wynton Marsalis, John Legend, Grace VanderWaal, and Nas.

On the August 11, 2022, episode, Colbert announced that Batiste had decided he would not be returning to The Late Show with Stephen Colbert, in order to "pursue personal and professional interests". However, he still made occasional appearances on the show, including its final episode on May 21, 2026.

=== 2020-2022: Juneteenth Celebration, Soul and We Are ===
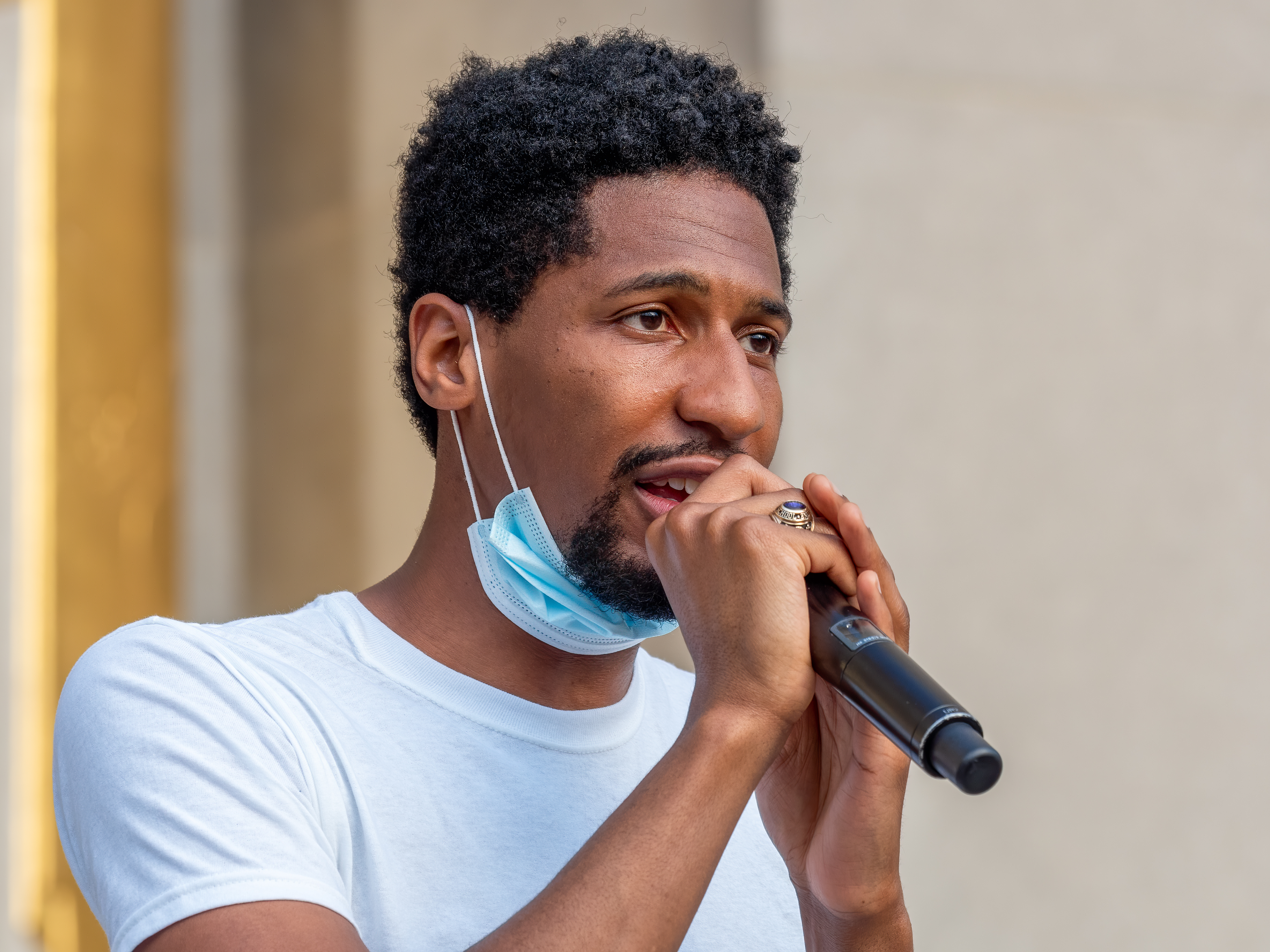
Batiste performs at Juneteenth.

In June 2020, Batiste took part in the Juneteenth celebration in Brooklyn, New York with a day of protests, marches, rallies, and vigils to "celebrate, show solidarity, and fight for equal rights and treatment of Black people." Performing on the steps of the Brooklyn Public Library, Batiste was joined by Matt Whitaker in a performance presented in partnership with Sing For Hope.

Batiste performs at Black Lives Matter rally at Barclays Center in 2020

The 2020 Juneteenth took place during the protests, following the murder of George Floyd, as well as the COVID-19 pandemic, seen by some as connected to an increase in an awareness of racial injustice. When questioned as to the differences he sees in the present movement for change and its connection to music, Batiste responded by saying: "...music has always been something that has had all of the different purposes of our life and our community and our healing and our unspoken pain – and the transmission of messages and the raising awareness of a condition of a people. [...] What's different, now, is that it's much more widespread in the support of changing the systemic oppression that's been going on for 400 years." He believes, "Now, it's more important than ever for us to be reintroduced to what our ancestors used music for, because it's been forgotten. [...] The world, at large, sees music as entertainment. It's never been that, at its root. It is that in one element of it, but the entire spectrum of music is far, far deeper and wide-ranging."

Batiste composed music for the 2020 film Soul, collaborating with Trent Reznor and Atticus Ross. The trio went on to win the Academy Award for Best Original Score and a Golden Globe Award for Best Original Score, among many other wins and nominations.

On March 19, 2021, Batiste released We Are, his fifth solo studio album. Speaking to Atwood Magazine, he described it as "a culmination of my life, to this point" and "the most representative of where I am, as a creative, and as an artist".

In July 2021, Batiste released a live EP, Live at Electric Lady, performed in one day at Electric Lady Studios. The album was released, exclusively, to Spotify.

In October 2021, he made a surprise performance at night singing "Like a Prayer" in the streets of Harlem, along with Madonna, promoting the release of her concert film Madame X.

At the 64th Grammy Awards, Batiste earned 11 nominations: eight for We Are, and three for Soul. Of the 11 nominations, Batiste won five awards, including Album of the Year, becoming the second Black artist to win that award since 2008, when Herbie Hancock won for his album River: The Joni Letters.

=== 2022-2023: American Symphony and World Music Radio ===
On September 22, 2022, Batiste conducted the premiere of his composition American Symphony at Carnegie Hall, New York. A review in Variety concluded: "It wasn't just the story of America, and its collage-like charms and vices. This was also Batiste's story, and he made a handsome orchestral debut of that story at Carnegie Hall, in a truly shining hour."

In 2023, Batiste was featured in the documentary film American Symphony, directed by Matthew Heineman, executive produced by Barack and Michelle Obama, which records the process of Batiste composing his first symphony, while his wife, Suleika Jaouad, suffers the return of her leukemia.

In June 2023, Batiste announced a new album World Music Radio. A concept album, it was released on August 18, 2023. Some of the album's featured artists include Lana Del Rey, Lil Wayne, NewJeans, and JID. The album was also supported by a single, "Calling Your Name".

=== 2024-2025: Uneasy Tour and Super Bowl LIX ===
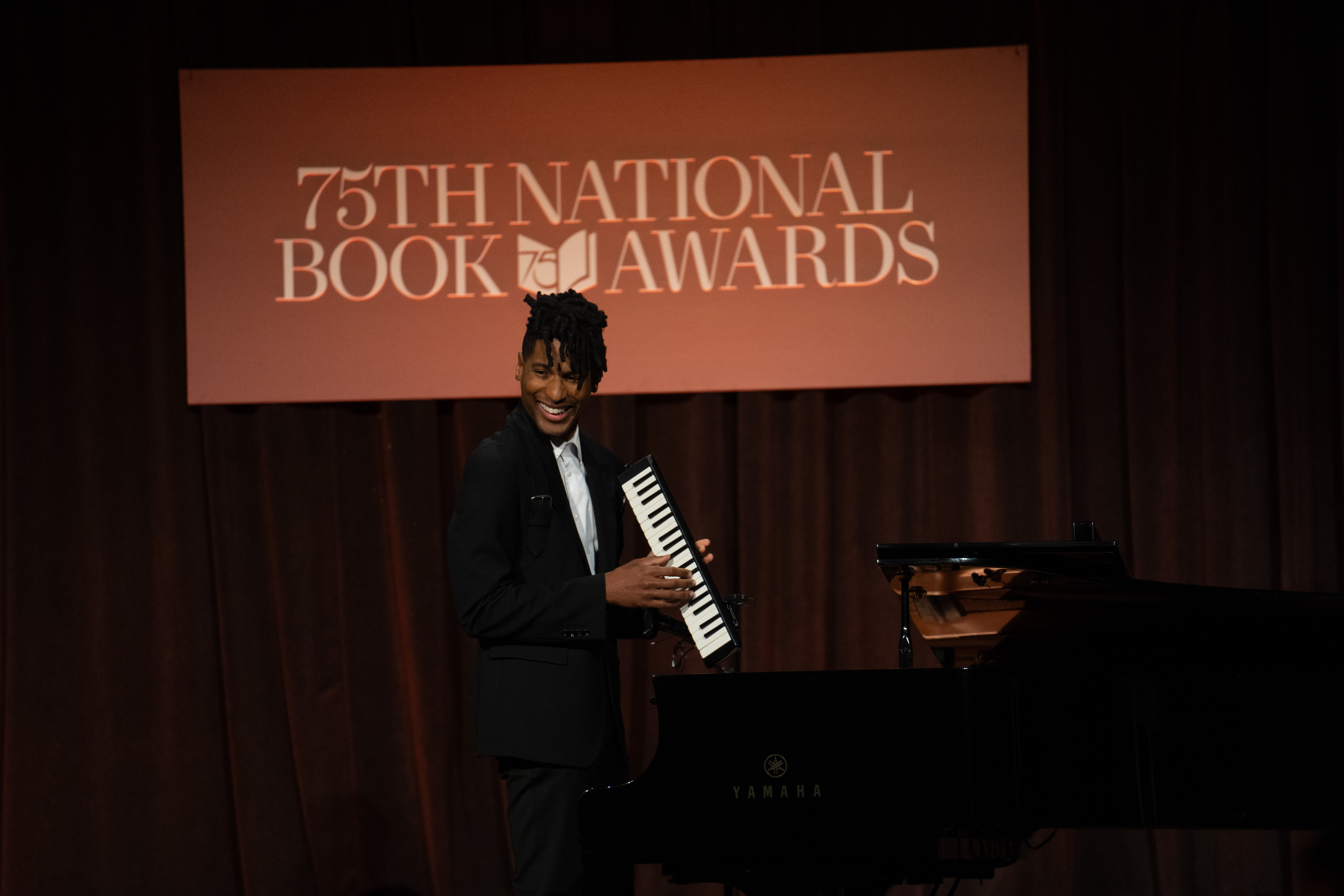
Batiste performing at the National Book Awards in 2024

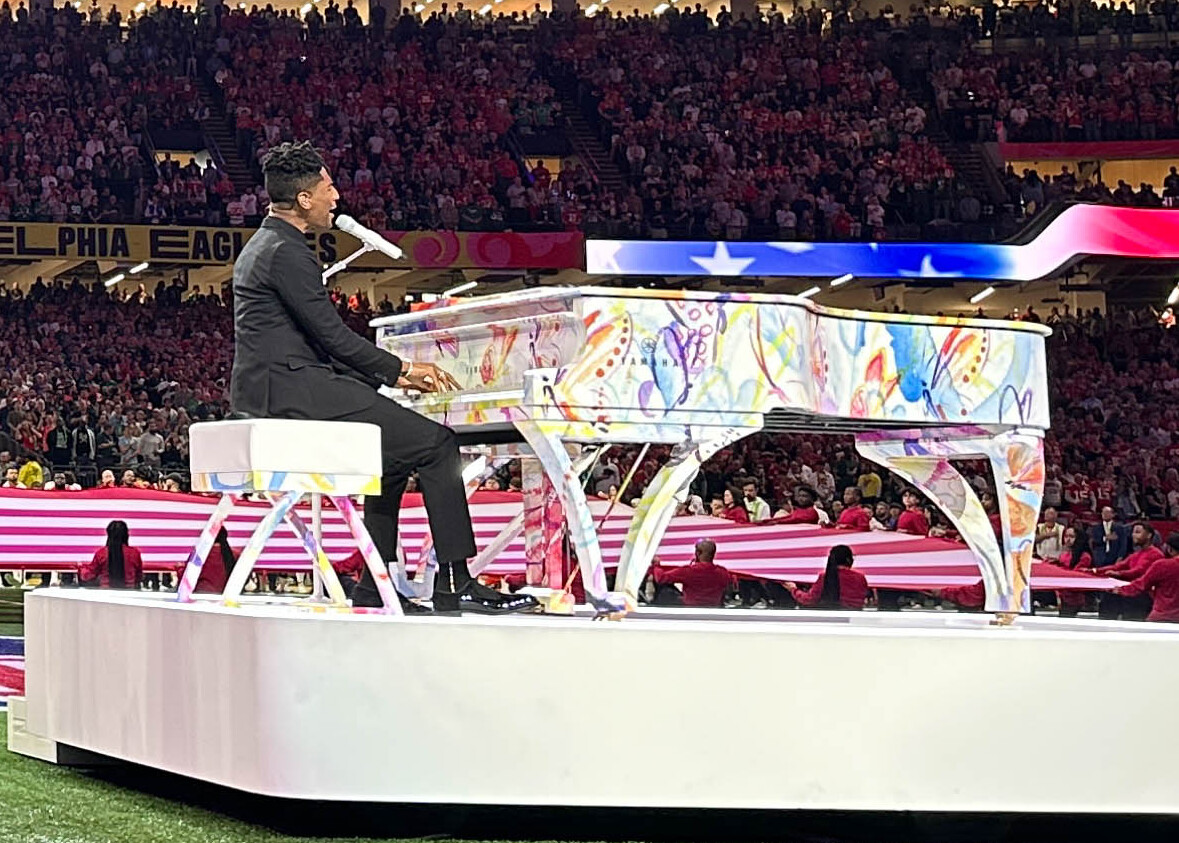
Batiste performing the National Anthem at Super Bowl LIX in New Orleans, Louisiana

During 2024, Batiste staged his Uneasy Tour, his first concert tour as a headlining act.

Batiste followed these with a number of solo shows, billed as "STREAMS: Jon Batiste At The Piano", in which Batiste improvised performances at the piano and on melodica in a stream-of-consciousness manner. A review in The Post-Standard characterized it as a "Modern maestro ... display[ing] his magic".

In November 2024, Batiste performed at the National Book Awards in New York City as a musical guest.

In February 2025, Batiste performed the national anthem at Super Bowl LIX accompanied by deaf actress Stephanie Nogueras in American Sign Language.

=== 2025-present: Big Money and Batiste Piano Series ===
In August 2025, Batiste's seventh album, Big Money, was released. Batiste performed songs in various genres, such as blues, R&B, and classic rock and featured collaborations with Andra Day, No I.D., and Randy Newman. In 2026, the album won the Grammy Award for Best Americana Album at the 68th Annual Grammy Awards.

On May 8, 2026, Batiste announced three new installments in his Batiste Piano Series to be released the coming summer: Black Mozart, Monk Meditations, and Monk Movements.

== Influences and music style ==
Batiste cites, among the artists who have most influenced his artistic and musical choices, Mahalia Jackson, James Brown, Louis Armstrong, Bruce Springsteen, Stevie Wonder, John Coltrane, Nina Simone, Miles Davis and Django Reinhardt. Interviewed by Forbes, Batiste explained the significance of jazz music:

Music is a real form of connection to a higher power at its greatest; music was a form of community that brought people together and gave them a common purpose. Jazz is really a term that doesn't encompass what it's pointing at, [...] the intellectual breadth of black geniuses who were basically denied the credential of being a genius in society because of their skin tone. [...] We always talk about improvisation, and it really is one of the only forms of music that exemplifies the American experiment putting all these different cultures into one country and coexisting and trying to create beautiful music together.

— Jon Batiste, in Jon Batiste: So Much More Than Stephen Colbert's Music Director (Forbes)

About his 2024 album Beethoven Blues, Batiste told The New York Times that Beethoven's music "is so very African, filled with polyrhythms" and the "feeling" of the blues. Batiste's original compositions on the album include "Dusklight Movement", inspired both by the "Moonlight" Sonata, and a bit by B.B. King's "The Thrill Is Gone".

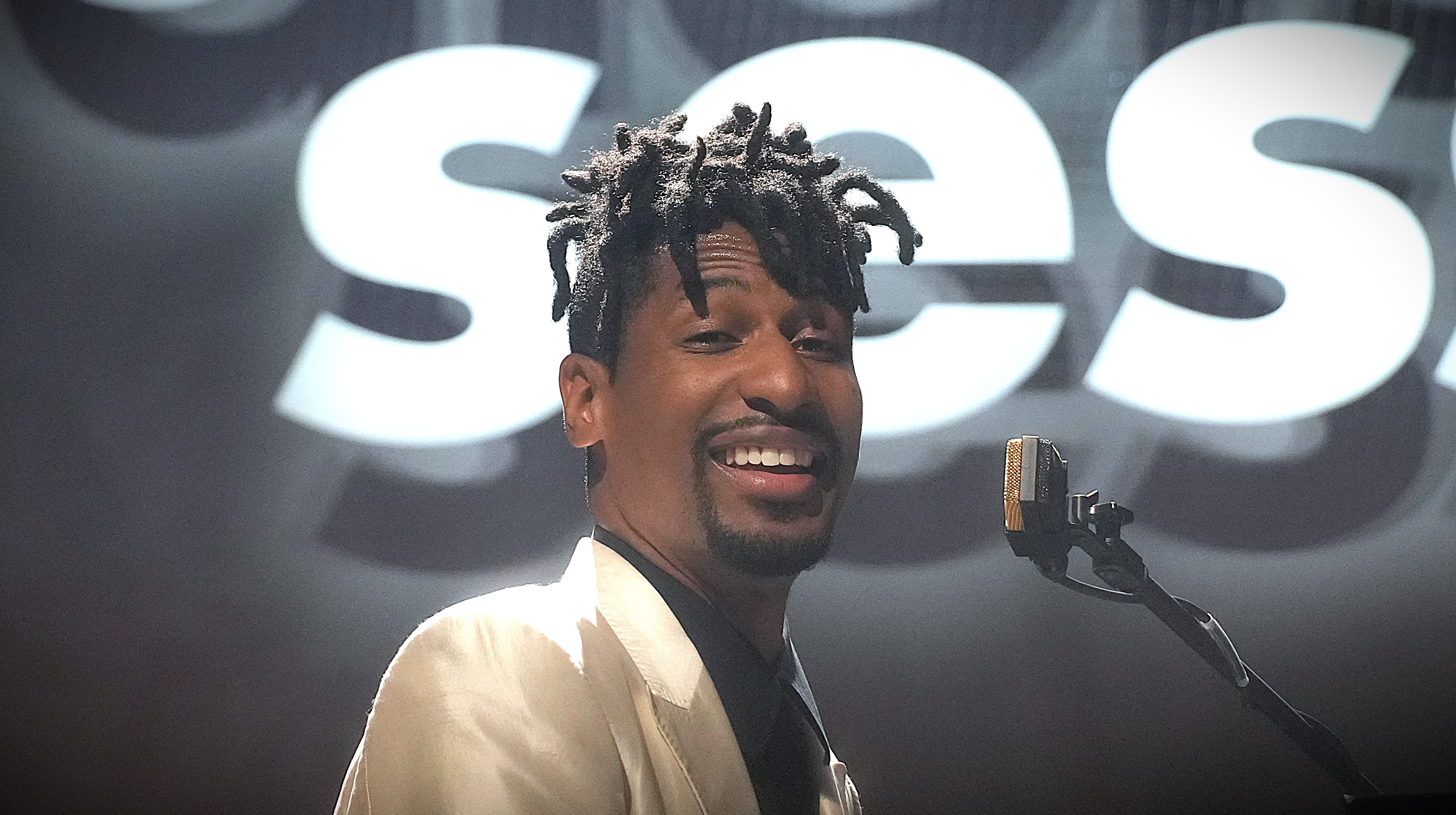
Batiste at Baloise Session 2025 in Basel (Switzerland).

In an Instagram post, Batiste named Nobuo Uematsu as one of his "earliest inspirations." In an interview with Uematsu, he said he became interested in composing when he was 10 years old and would play Final Fantasy music on his Kawai keyboard, and then would begin changing the notes to create his own "vision of the thing."

== Activism and philanthropy ==
Batiste was born into a family active in the struggle against racial segregation in the United States; his grandfather, David Gauthier, was president of the Louisiana Postal Workers Union, involved in the 1968 labor strike sponsored by the Memphis, Tennessee Department of Public Works for higher wages and safer working conditions.

Batiste is a supporter of civil rights and the fight against racism, participating publicly in numerous demonstrations, including the marches promoted by the Black Lives Matter movement. Following the murder of George Floyd in June 2020, Batiste organized peaceful protests in New York City against police brutality in the United States.

Through the single "We Are", he supports the Equal Justice Initiative of attorney and activist Bryan Stevenson. Batiste is also among the sponsors of several initiatives, including the Innocence Project, the NAACP Legal Defense and Educational Fund, and The Legacy Museum.

== Personal life ==
Batiste is married to journalist, musician, and best-selling author Suleika Jaouad. The two met as teenagers at band camp. On April 3, 2022, the couple revealed in an interview on CBS News Sunday Morning that they had been married in a private ceremony at home, in February 2022.

Batiste grew up in the Catholic Church and sometimes went to the Baptist Church, and then eventually to the AME Church. He is a Christian, and he has been outspoken about his faith.

== Filmography ==
Year	Film	Role
2026	The Devil Wears Prada 2	Himself

== Discography ==
Jon Batiste discography
- Studio albums: 6
- Extended plays: 9
- Soundtrack albums: 2
- Live albums: 5
- Singles: 11
- Collaborative albums: 3

=== Studio albums ===
Title	Details	Peak chart positions									
Title	Details	US	US Jazz	US Indie	US R&B/ HH	AUS Hit.	CAN	FRA	GER	SWI	UK DL
Times in New Orleans	Released: June 28, 2005; Label: Self-released; Formats: CD, LP, digital download, streaming	—	—	—	—	—	—	—	—	—	—
Jazz Is Now	Released: May 28, 2013; Label: Naht Jona; Formats: CD, digital download, streaming	—	—	—	—	—	—	—	—	—	—
Social Music (with Stay Human)	Released: October 15, 2013; Label: Razor & Tie, Concord; Formats: CD, LP, digital download, streaming	134	1	—	—	—	—	—	—	—	__
Christmas with Jon Batiste	Released: November 19, 2016; Label: Naht Jona; Formats: CD, LP	198	3	11	—	—	—	—	—	—	—
Hollywood Africans	Released: September 28, 2018; Label: Verve, Naht Jona; Formats: CD, LP, digital download, streaming	— (Note: Hollywood Africans did not enter the Billboard 200 but did peak at number 33 on the Top Album Sales chart.)	2	—	—	—	—	—	—	—	—
We Are	Released: March 19, 2021; Label: Verve, Naht Jona; Formats: CD, LP, digital download, streaming	25	—	—	14	5	81	61	66	39	25
World Music Radio	Released: August 18, 2023; Label: Verve, Interscope, Naht Jona; Formats: CD, LP, digital download, streaming	104	—	—	—	—	—	—	—	82	—
Beethoven Blues (Batiste Piano Series, Vol. 1)	Released: November 15, 2024; Label: Verve, Naht Jona; Formats: CD, LP, digital download, streaming	64	—	—	—	—	—	—	—	50	—
Big Money	Released: August 22, 2025; Label: Verve, Naht Jona; Formats: CD, LP, digital download, streaming	— (Note: Big Money did not enter the Billboard 200, but peaked at number 11 on the Billboard Top Album Sales chart.)	—	—	—	—	—	— (Note: Big Money did not enter the official Top French Albums chart, but peaked at number 90 on the Top French Physical Albums chart.)	—	—	—
Black Mozart (Batiste Piano Series, Vol. 2)	Scheduled: June 19, 2026; Label: Verve, Naht Jona; Formats: CD, digital download, streaming	—	—	—	—	—	—	— (Note: Black Mozart (Batiste Piano Series, Vol. 2) did not enter the official Top French Albums chart, but peaked at number 119 on the Top French Physical Albums chart.)	—	—	—
Monk Meditations (Batiste Piano Series, Vol. 3)	Released: August 14, 2026; Label: Verve, Naht Jona; Formats: CD, digital download, streaming	—	—	—	—	—	—	—	—	—	—
Monk Movements (Batiste Piano Series, Vol. 4)	Released: August 14, 2026; Label: Verve, Naht Jona; Formats: CD, digital download, streaming	—	9	—	—	—	—	—	—	—	—
"—" denotes a recording that did not chart or was not released in that territory.

=== Collaborative albums ===
Title	Details
The Process (with Chad Smith and Bill Laswell)	Released: October 21, 2014; Label: M.O.D. Technologies; Formats: CD, LP, digital download, streaming
Meditations (with Cory Wong)	Released: May 29, 2020; Label: Self-released; Formats: CD, LP, digital download, streaming
Swing States: Harmony in the Battleground (with Regina Carter, John Daversa, and Harvey Mason)	Released: July 13, 2020; Label: Tiger Turn; Formats: Digital download, streaming

=== Soundtrack albums ===
Title	Details	Peak chart positions			
Title	Details	US Current	US OST	UK Comp.	UK OST
Soul: Original Motion Picture Soundtrack (with Trent Reznor and Atticus Ross)	Released: December 18, 2020; Label: Walt Disney; Format: CD, digital download, streaming	69	24	58	12
Jazz Selections: Music From and Inspired by Soul	Released: September 24, 2021; Label: Walt Disney; Format: LP, digital download, streaming	—	—	—	—

=== Live albums ===
List of live albums, with selected details
Title	Details	Peak chart positions	
Title	Details	US Jazz	US Heat
Live in New York: At the Rubin Museum of Art	Released: May 26, 2006; Label: Self-released; Format: Digital download, streaming	—	—
The Music of John Lewis (with the Jazz at Lincoln Center Orchestra and Wynton Marsalis)	Released: March 24, 2017; Label: Blue Engine; Format: CD, digital download	3	—
Anatomy of Angels: Live at the Village Vanguard	Released: August 2, 2019; Label: Verve, Naht Jona; Format: CD, LP, digital download	3	20
Chronology of a Dream: Live at the Village Vanguard	Released: November 1, 2019; Label: Verve, Naht Jona; Format: CD, LP, digital download, streaming	7	—
Live at Electric Lady	Released: July 29, 2021; Label: Verve, Naht Jona; Format: Streaming	—	—

=== Extended plays ===
List of extended plays, with selected details
Title	Details	Peak chart positions	
Title	Details	US Jazz	US Heat
In the Night	Released: 2008; Label: Self-released; Format: Digital download, streaming	—	—
The Amazing Jon Batiste!	Released: 2009; Label: Self-released; Format: CD, digital download, streaming	—	—
MY N.Y. (with Stay Human)	Released: October 28, 2011; Label: Self-released; Format: Digital download, streaming	—	—
The Late Show EP (with Stay Human)	Released: February 5, 2016; Label: The Late Show Inc.; Format: Digital download, streaming	3	18
We Are: Roots & Traditions	Released: November 27, 2020; Label: Verve; Format: Vinyl	— (Note: WE ARE: Roots & Traditions did not enter the Billboard Jazz Albums chart but peaked at number nine on the Contemporary Jazz Albums chart.)	—
Spotify Singles	Released: March 27, 2019; Label: Verve, Naht Jona; Format: Streaming	—	—
A Little Bit of Soul	Released: December 21, 2020; Label: Verve, Naht Jona; Format: Digital download, streaming	—	—
We Are the Golden Ones	Released: January 12, 2021; Label: Verve, Naht Jona; Format: Digital download, streaming	—	—
Jon Batiste: The Nominated Collection	Released: April 4, 2022; Label: Verve, Naht Jona; Format: Digital download, streaming	—	—

=== Singles ===
==== As lead artist ====
Title	Year	Peak chart positions								Album
Title	Year	US Dig.	US AAA	US R&B/ HH	US R&B	US Rock Air.	CAN Dig.	JPN O/S	MEX Air.	Album
"Rise Up" (with Fonseca)	2014	—	—	—	—	—	—	—	—	Non-album single
"Endless Love" (featuring Aloe Blacc)	2016	—	—	— (Note: "Endless Love" did not enter the Billboard Hot R&B/Hip-Hop Songs chart but peaked at number 22 on the Adult R&B Airplay chart.)	—	—	—	—	—	Christmas with Jon Batiste
"Ohio" (with Leon Bridges and Gary Clark Jr.)	2017	—	—	—	—	—	—	—	—	Non-album singles
"Battle Hymn of the Republic"	2017	—	—	—	—	—	—	—	—	Non-album singles
"Sweet Lorraine"	2018	—	—	—	—	—	—	—	—	Relief: A Benefit for the Jazz Foundation of America's Musicians Relief Fund
"Have Yourself a Merry Little Christmas" (Recorded at Spotify Studios NYC) (featuring Danielle Brooks)	2018	—	—	—	—	—	—	—	—	Non-album single
"Creative" (live)	2019	—	—	—	—	—	—	—	—	Anatomy Of Angels: Live at the Village Vanguard
"It's All Right" (from Soul) (Duet version) (with Celeste)	2020	—	—	—	—	—	—	—	—	Non-album single
"I Need You"	2020	—	2	— (Note: "I Need You" did not enter the Billboard Hot R&B/Hip-Hop Songs chart, but peaked at number 14 on the R&B/Hip-Hop Digital Song Sales chart.)	— (Note: "I Need You" did not enter the Billboard Hot R&B Songs chart but peaked at number seven on the R&B Digital Song Sales chart.)	—	—	—	—	We Are
"Freedom"	2021	4	13	— (Note: "Freedom" did not enter the Billboard Hot R&B/Hip-Hop Songs chart, but peaked at number two on the R&B/Hip-Hop Digital Song Sales chart.)	19	39	13	18	21	We Are
"Cry"	2021	—	—	—	—	—	—	—	—	We Are
"Sweet" (with Pentatonix and Diane Warren)	2022	—	—	—	—	—	—	—	—	Diane Warren: The Cave Sessions Vol. 1
"The Light Shines Brightest in the Dark" (from Marlowe)	2023	—	—	—	—	—	—	—	—	Non-album single
"Be Who You Are (Real Magic)" (featuring JID, NewJeans, and Camilo)	2023	—	—	—	—	—	—	7	—	World Music Radio
"Calling Your Name"	2023	—	21	—	—	—	—	—	—	World Music Radio
"Drink Water" (featuring Jon Bellion and Fireboy DML)	2023	—	—	—	—	—	—	—	—	World Music Radio
"Sunshine in the Room" (with James Bay)	2025	—	16	—	—	—	—	8	—	Changes All the Time (Deluxe)
"Big Money"	2025	—	22	—	—	—	—	10	—	Big Money
"Hard Fought Hallelujah" (with Brandon Lake and Jelly Roll)	2025	—	—	—	—	—	—	—	—	Non-album single
"—" denotes a recording that did not chart or was not released in that territory.

==== As featured artist ====
Title	Year	Album
"When I Get There" (Peter CottonTale featuring Jon Batiste, Jeremih, Jamila Woods, and Jack Red)	2020	Catch
"Skylark" (Nora Germain featuring Jon Batiste)	2020	Non-album single
"Sunday Bloody Sunday" (Deon Jones featuring Jon Batiste)	2020	Non-album single
"L.O.V.E." (Yung Bae featuring EarthGang, Jon Batiste, and Sherwyn)	2022	Groove Continental: Side A
"Jon Batiste Interlude" (Lana Del Rey featuring Jon Batiste)	2023	Did You Know That There's a Tunnel Under Ocean Blvd
"Candy Necklace" (Lana Del Rey featuring Jon Batiste)	2023	Did You Know That There's a Tunnel Under Ocean Blvd
"Saint Ferdinand" (Lauren Daigle featuring Jon Batiste and Natalie Hemby)	2023	Lauren Daigle
"Modern Times" (Jon Bellion & Jon Batiste)	2025	Father Figure
"Orpheus" (mgk)	2025	Lost Americana

== Awards and honors ==
Batiste has received several accolades, including being placed in the 2016 Forbes 30 Under 30 music list, and being named Grand Marshal of Endymion Parade in New Orleans in 2018.

He has been awarded the American Jazz Museum Lifetime Achievement Award, the Harry Chapin ASCAP Humanitarian Award and the Movado Future Legend Award. In May 2017, Batiste received an honorary degree from Salve Regina University for his musical achievements and contributions to Newport's 2014 International Jazz Day. In 2018, he was nominated for a Grammy Award for Best American Roots Performance for "Saint James Infirmary Blues". In 2020, he received two Grammy nominations: his album Chronology of a Dream: Live at the Village Vanguard was nominated for Best Contemporary Instrumental Album, and Meditations (with Cory Wong) was nominated for Best New Age Album.

In 2020, Batiste, along with Nine Inch Nails band members Trent Reznor and Atticus Ross, composed the score for the Disney and Pixar animated film, Soul. The three went on to win the Golden Globe, the Critics' Choice Award, the BAFTA Award, and the Academy Award for Best Original Score. Batiste's Oscar win made him only the second black composer to win an award in the category (after Herbie Hancock in 1987). In 2021, Batiste received 11 nominations and became the most nominated artist at the 64th Annual Grammy Awards.

In 2022, Batiste won a Grammy Award for Album of the Year. He was named in Time magazine's 2022 "Top 100 Most Influential People", in the Icons category. Batiste was featured on the 2022 New Orleans Jazz & Heritage Festival's commemorative poster.

In May 2025, Batiste was awarded an honorary doctorate degree in music from Brown University, later performing at the university commencement ceremony.

In May 2026, Columbia University awarded Batiste an honorary Doctor of Music degree for his "musical creations that defy categorization and express the joy and the pain of being alive".

In June 2026, CBS News included his song "Freedom" in its list of the 250 essential American songs of the past 250 years.
