= Suleika Jaouad =

American writer and motivational speaker (born 1988)

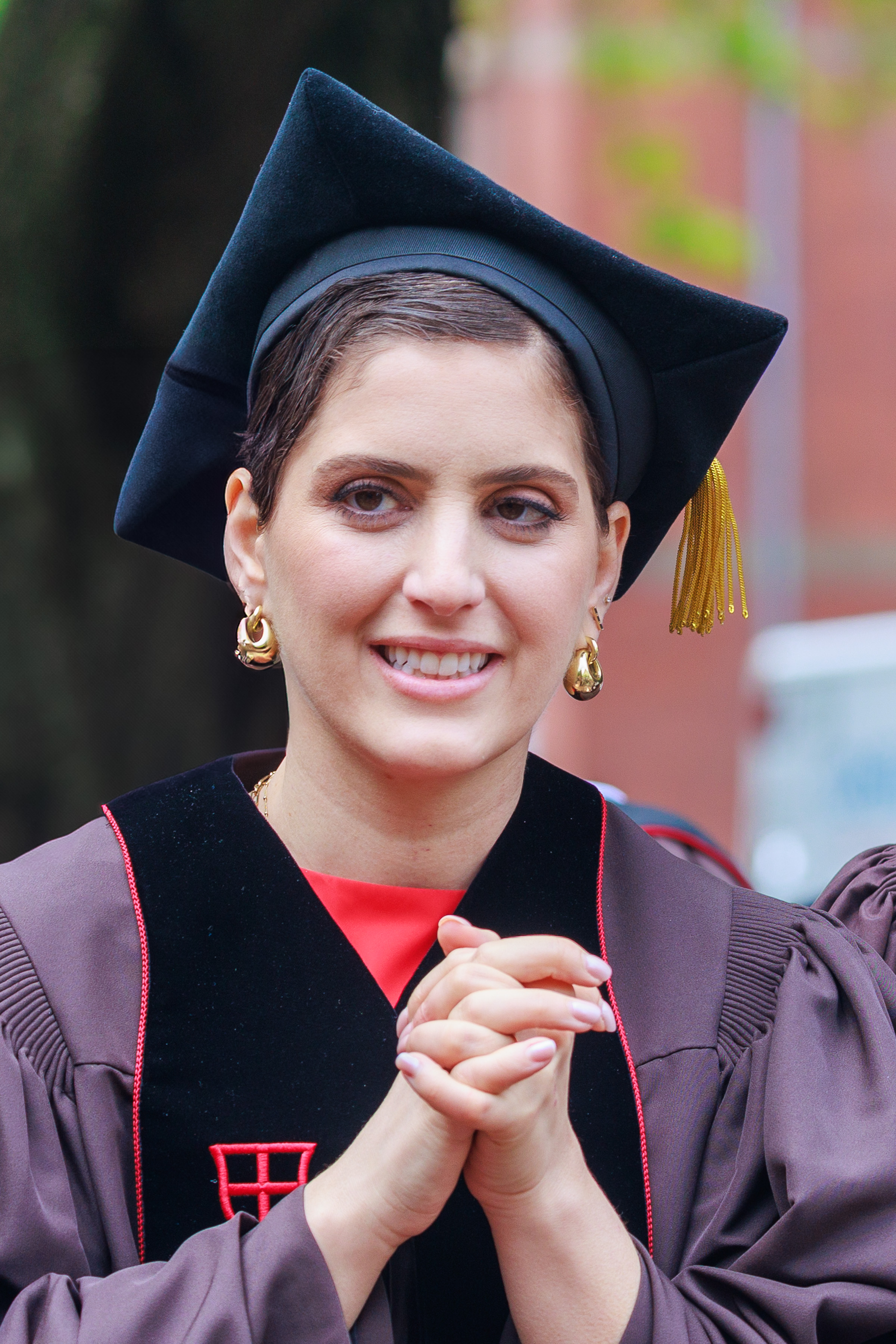
- Jaouad in 2025
- Born: July 5, 1988 (age 38); New York City, U.S.
- Education: Princeton University (AB); Bennington College (MFA)
- Occupations: Writer, advocate, and motivational speaker
- Years active: 2019–present
- Spouse: Jon Batiste (m. 2022)

Suleika Jaouad (/suːˈleɪkə dʒəˈwɑːd/ soo-LAY-kə jə-WAHD; Arabic: سليكة جواد; born July 5, 1988) is an American writer, advocate, and motivational speaker. She is the author of the "Life, Interrupted" column in The New York Times and has also written for Vogue, Glamour, NPR's All Things Considered and Women's Health. Her 2021 memoir Between Two Kingdoms, covering her struggle with leukemia, was a New York Times Best Seller. Her second book, The Book of Alchemy: A Creative Practice for an Inspired Life, was published on April 22, 2025.

== Early life and education ==
Jaouad was born in New York City to a Muslim father from Tunisia and a Catholic mother from Switzerland. Her father, Hédi, taught French at Skidmore College in Saratoga Springs, New York. Her mother, Anne, is an artist. Suleika attended the Juilliard School's pre-college program, where she studied the double bass.

She attended Princeton University, where she majored in Near Eastern studies and double-minored in French and gender studies, receiving an AB with highest honors in 2010. A decade later, in 2020, she earned an MFA in writing and literature from Bennington College. Jaouad travels around the U.S., teaching writing and wellness workshops and speaking at high schools, universities, hospitals, corporations, fund-raisers, and professional events. Her story has been featured on NPR's Talk of the Nation, NBC's Weekend Today, and the CBS News, while also appearing in The Paris Review, the Los Angeles Times, and Darling magazine, among others. Her TED Talk, entitled "What almost dying taught me about living," was released in June 2019.

== Between Two Kingdoms ==
Between Two Kingdoms: A Memoir of a Life Interrupted
- Author: Suleika Jaouad
- Language: English
- Genre: Memoir
- Publisher: Random House
- Publication date: February 9, 2021
- Publication place: United States
- Media type: Print (Hardcover, Paperback), Audiobook
- Pages: 352
- ISBN: 9780399588587 Hardcover

Between Two Kingdoms: A Memoir of a Life Interrupted is a memoir published in 2021 by Random House that discusses her cancer diagnosis, treatment, and recovery. The title of the book comes from a line in Susan Sontag's Illness as Metaphor: "Everyone who is born holds dual citizenship in the kingdom of the well and in the kingdom of the sick."

In the book, Jaouad revisits her life before and after her cancer diagnosis "to forge a path forward after remission. Drawing on journals, medical records, letters, e-mails, and interviews with many of those who appear across its pages, Jaouad's memoir details her early symptoms, initial diagnosis and then, in great detail, the physical, mental, and emotional toll cancer takes on her and those around her."

The book was generally well received by critics, including starred reviews from Booklist, Library Journal, and Publishers Weekly.

Writing for Library Journal, Barrie Olmstead wrote, "Jaouad does a beautiful job of writing from this place of 'dual citizenship,' where she finds pain but also joy, kinship, and possibility." Publishers Weekly called the book "a stunning memoir, well-crafted and hard to put down," while Booklist's June Sawyer said it was "[b]oldly candid and truly memorable."

Between Two Kingdoms also received positive reviews from Kirkus Reviews, Los Angeles Times, NPR, and Shelf Awareness. Kirkus Reviews called the book "[m]emorable, lyrical, and ultimately hopeful: a book that speaks intently to anyone who suffers from illness and loss." According to NPR Heller McAlpin, "Jaouad's book stands out not only because she has lived to parse the saga of her medical battle with the benefit of hindsight, but also because it encompasses the less familiar tale of what it's like to survive and have to figure out how to live again." Shelf Awareness explained,

Though heavy, Jaouad's story is steeped in a wry optimism. This is in part because readers know Jaouad will survive to write this book, but it is also a testament to what makes Between Two Kingdoms so compelling: Jaouad's uncanny ability to reach into her pain and turn it into something else. She does not deny or gloss over the challenges of her diagnosis or the gut-wrenching torture of some of her treatments, yet she reckons with ways these impossible years of her life forged her into the woman she has since become.

The Los Angeles Times also commended Jaouad's openness and candor, calling it key to the book.

Booklist also provided a positive review for the audiobook, noting, "Jaouad, reading her own work, is a sympathetic and appealing narrator. Although she tells a difficult and painful story, her thoughtful tone never wavers toward anger or bitterness. Instead, she describes difficult subjects patiently, only adding emphasis to conversations to convey the truly fraught nature of their subjects."

== Personal life ==
Jaouad is married to musician Jon Batiste, with whom she has been in a relationship since 2014. Jaouad and Batiste met as teenagers at band camp. In April 2022, the couple revealed in a television interview that they had married in February 2022.

When Jaouad was diagnosed with a rare form of acute myeloid leukemia in 2011, doctors said she had only a 35% chance of surviving. She survived and has written and spoken extensively about her medical experiences. Her column, "Life, Interrupted," was part of the New York Times Well blog. A video based on the column received an Emmy award. In December 2021, Jaouad announced that her cancer had returned and she had undergone a second bone marrow transplant. The cancer returned for a third time in the summer of 2024.

In 2023, she was featured in the documentary film American Symphony, directed by Matthew Heineman, which captures her fight against the return of her cancer while her husband, Jon Batiste, was composing his first symphony.

== Awards ==
Year	Award	Result	Ref.
2021	Goodreads Choice Award for Memoir & Autobiography	Nominee	
2021	Booklist Editors' Choice: Adult Books	Selection	
2021	Booklist's Best Memoirs of 2021	Top 10	
