= World Music Radio =

Studio album by Jon Batiste
- Released: August 18, 2023
- Genre: Experimental; pop; hip-hop; jazz
- Length: 64:51
- Label: Verve; Interscope
- Producer: Jon Batiste; Jon Bellion; Rogét Chahayed; Chassol; Braxton Cook; Zach Dawes; DJ Khalil; Ryan Lynn; The Monsters & Strangerz; Pete Nappi; Nelson Ray; Kaleb "KQuick" Rollins; Enrique Sanchez; Johnny Simpson; Wesley Singerman; Jahaan Sweet; Taydex; TenRoc; Nick Waterhouse; Dan Wilson

Jon Batiste chronology
We Are (2021)	World Music Radio (2023)

Singles from World Music Radio
- 1. "Calling Your Name" Released: June 28, 2023; 2. "Drink Water" Released: July 12, 2023

World Music Radio is the seventh studio album by American singer Jon Batiste. It was released on August 18, 2023, through Verve Records and Interscope Records. The album features guest appearances by JID, NewJeans, Camilo, Jon Bellion, Fireboy DML, Kenny G, Lil Wayne, Leigh-Anne and Lana Del Rey.

The record project received four nominations at the 66th Annual Grammy Awards. The album was nominated for Album of the Year, while the tracks "Worship" and "Butterfly" were nominated for Record of the Year and Song of the Year respectively.

== Background ==
On March 19, 2021, Batiste released his sixth studio album, We Are, a breakthrough record that earned him the Grammy Award for Album of the Year 2022 and entered the charts in multiple countries. On March 4, 2023, Verve Records president Jamie Krents revealed that Batiste was focused on his upcoming album and that it would be out later in 2023.

World Music Radio is a concept album that revolves around an interstellar entity named Billy Bob Bo who creates "potpourri of the far-flung musical languages of Earth and transmits it to the cosmos with chuckling". In a statement, Batiste explained that he created the record with a newfound feeling of "liberation" as well as a "renewed sense of exploration of my personhood, my craft and of the world around". He announced the album on June 27, 2023, and shared the lead single "Calling Your Name" along with a visualizer. The album was made available for preorder in a multitude of formats, including signed copies and limited edition vinyls. While revealing details of the record, Batiste wanted to shed light on the intentions behind the album, saying that it is designed to "open your heart and stretch your mind, expanding your vision of popular art". He went as far as wanting to "redefine terms like world music".

== Critical reception ==
Professional ratings
Aggregate scores
Source	Rating
Metacritic	69/100
Review scores
Source	Rating
AllMusic	4/5 stars
The Guardian	3/5 stars
NME	4/5 stars
Pitchfork	5.6/10

World Music Radio received a score of 69 out of 100 on review aggregator Metacritic based on five critics' reviews, indicating "generally favorable" reception. Bhanuj Kappal of Pitchfork wrote that World Music Radio "collapses the wide-ranging possibilities of global music into something for everyone and no one" as "Batiste's idea of universal music is so averse to cultural specificity—except the Afro-American traditions he's rooted in—that listening to it can feel like a sterile game of spot-the-style". Alexis Petridis of The Guardian remarked that it is "worth noting that the songs are tightly written and hooky, but it is hard to see exactly what Batiste is bringing to the table: even the album's radio show concept, complete with between-song announcements by a DJ, is pretty well-worn".

== Track listing ==
World Music Radio track listing
No.	Title	Writer(s)	Producer(s)	Length
1.	"Hello, Billy Bob"	Jon Batiste; Rahm Silverglade	Batiste; Silverglade; Rogét Chahayed; Wesley Singerman; Silverglade^{[a]}	1:37
2.	"Raindance" (featuring Native Soul)	Batiste; Andre Lindal; Jason Cornet; Jon Bellion; Jordan K. Johnson; Stefan Johnson; Justin Bieber; Michael Pollack; Nasri Atweh; Pete Nappi; Rodney Jerkins; Sean Anderson	Batiste; Bellion; Nappi; Tenroc; The Monsters & Strangerz	3:10
3.	"Be Who You Are" (featuring JID, NewJeans and Camilo)	Batiste; Bellion; Nappi; Cornet; Headley Bennett; Huford Brown; Anthony Ferguson; Robert Lyn; Jackie Mittoo; Leroy Sibbles; Fitzroy Simpson; Gigi; Ylva Dimberg; Camilo Echeverry; Destin Route	Batiste; Bellion^{[p]}; Nappi^{[p]}; TenRoc	3:34
4.	"Worship"	Batiste; Bellion; Nappi; Cornet	Batiste; Bellion; Nappi; TenRoc	4:13
5.	"My Heart" (featuring Rita Payés)	Batiste; Braxton Cook; Enrique Sánchez; Jahaan Sweet; Ray Nelson II; Payés	Batiste; Cook; Sweet; Sánchez; Nelson Ray	2:26
6.	"Drink Water" (featuring Jon Bellion and Fireboy DML)	Batiste; Bellion; Nappi; Adedamola Oyinlola Adefolahan; Johnny Simpson; Elisha Noll	Batiste; Bellion; Nappi; Simpson	2:49
7.	"Calling Your Name"	Batiste; Bellion; Nappi; Cornet	Batiste; Bellion; Nappi; TenRoc	1:56
8.	"Clair de Lune" (featuring Kenny G)	Batiste; Kenneth Gorelick	Batiste	1:17
9.	"Butterfly"	Batiste; Dan Wilson	Batiste; Wilson	3:50
10.	"17th Ward Prelude"	Batiste	Batiste	0:13
11.	"Uneasy" (featuring Lil Wayne)	Batiste; Bellion; Nappi; Cornet; Dwayne Carter	Batiste; Bellion; Nappi; TenRoc	5:21
12.	"Call Now (504-305-8269)" (featuring Michael Batiste)	Batiste; Nija Charles; Chahayed; Singerman; Taylor Dexter	Batiste; Chahayed; Singerman; Taydex	3:19
13.	"Chassol" (Chassol featuring Jon Batiste)	Christophe Chassol	Chassol; Ryan Lynn	1:09
14.	"Boom for Real"	Batiste	Batiste; Kassa Overall^{[a]}	2:47
15.	"Movement 18' (Heroes)"	Batiste	Batiste	4:35
16.	"Master Power"	Batiste; Nick Waterhouse	Batiste; Waterhouse	3:33
17.	"Running Away" (featuring Leigh-Anne)	Batiste; Leigh-Anne Pinnock; Harold Lilly; Khalil Abdul-Rahman; Nathaniel J. Warner; Charles; Nikki Grier; Chahayed; Singerman	Batiste; Chahayed; DJ Khalil; Singerman; Nathaniel Warner^{[v]}; Nick Cooper^{[v]}	5:01
18.	"Goodbye, Billy Bob"	Batiste	Batiste	1:33
19.	"White Space"	Batiste	Batiste	2:48
20.	"Wherever You Are"	Batiste; Cornet; Nappi	Batiste; Nappi; TenRoc; Kaleb "KQuick" Rollins	4:51
21.	"Life Lesson" (featuring Lana Del Rey)	Batiste; Del Rey	Batiste; Zach Dawes; Cooper^{[v]}	4:49
Total length:				64:51

Notes

- ^{^[p]} signifies a primary and vocal producer.
- ^{^[a]} signifies an additional producer.
- ^{^[v]} signifies a vocal producer.

== Personnel ==
Musicians

- Jon Batiste – vocals (tracks 1–7, 9, 11–21), synthesizer (track 1), keyboards (3); harmonium, melodica (7); piano (9, 11, 14–19, 21); clarinet, programming (14); organ (17), sound effects (20)
- Shannon Powell – drums (1)
- Rahm Silverglade – keyboards (1)
- Jon Bellion – background vocals (2–4, 7, 11), programming (2–4, 6, 7, 11), vocals (6); bass, guitar, keyboards (7)
- Pete Nappi – background vocals, guitar, programming (2–4, 6, 7, 11); bass (7)
- TenRoc – background vocals, bass, guitar, keyboards, programming (2–4, 7, 11)
- Native Soul – vocals (2)
- Brennan Gautier – background vocals (3)
- Luca Stewart – background vocals (3)
- Camilo – vocals (3)
- JID – vocals (3)
- NewJeans – vocals (3)
- Braxton Cook – flute, trumpet (5)
- Rita Payés – trombone, vocals (5)
- Fireboy DML – vocals (6)
- Kenny G – saxophone (8)
- David Gauthier – voice (10)
- Lil Wayne – guitar, vocals (11)
- Michael Batiste – background vocals (12)
- Cassol – bass, piano, Rhodes, synth bass, vocals (13)
- Mathieu Edouard – drums (13)
- Kassa Overall – drum programming (14)
- Connor Gallaher – acoustic guitar, steel guitar (16)
- Brian Lang – double bass (16)
- Josh Adams – drums (16)
- Nick Waterhouse – electric guitar (16)
- Pedrum Siadatian – electric guitar (16)
- Matthew Correia – percussion (16)
- Nikki Grier – background vocals (17)
- Daniel Seeff – bass (17)
- Wesley Singerman – guitar, programming (17)
- Rogét Chahayed – keyboards, programming (17)
- DJ Khalil – programming (17)
- Leigh-Anne – vocals (17)
- Mehrnam Rastegari – strings (20)
- Pastor Drew – voice (20)
- Zach Dawes – bass (21)
- Gabe Noel – cello (21)
- Greg Koller – string arrangement (21)
- Gabe Witcher – violin (21)
- Lana Del Rey – vocals (21)

Technical

- Chris Gehringer – mastering (1, 2, 4–21)
- Randy Merrill – mastering (3)
- Josh Gudwin – mixing (1, 5, 6)
- Kaleb "KQuick" Rollins – mixing (1, 10–13, 15, 17), recording (11, 18, 19, 21), vocal engineering (12), vocal mixing (17)
- Serban Ghenea – mixing (2–4)
- Manny Marroquin – mixing (7)
- Laura Sisk – mixing (8, 9, 16, 21)
- Jon Batiste – mixing (14, 18–20), recording (1, 5, 10)
- Julian Vasquez – recording (1, 12, 17)
- Pete Nappi – recording (2–4, 6, 7, 11)
- Jahaan Sweet – recording (5)
- Rita Payés – recording (5)
- John Arbuckle – recording (7)
- Kenny G – recording (8)
- Chaz Sexton – recording (9)
- Marc Whitmore – recording (12, 14, 17, 20, 21)
- Wesley Singerman – recording (12, 17)
- Chassol – recording (13)
- Zac Brown – recording (15)
- Ian Doerr – recording (16)
- Jacob Ferguson – recording (21)
- Fabian Marasciullo – vocal mixing (11)
- Gabe Witcher – recording arrangement (21)
- Bryce Bordone – mixing assistance (2–4)
- Dave Ozinga – recording assistance (16)
- Bobby Mota – mastering assistance (17), recording assistance (18–20)
- Gregg White – mastering assistance (17), recording assistance (18–20)
- Will Worden – tape realization (16)

== Charts ==
Chart performance for World Music Radio
Chart (2023)	Peak position
Swiss Albums (Schweizer Hitparade)	82
US Billboard 200	104
