= Andrew Watt production discography =

Discography of Andrew Watt

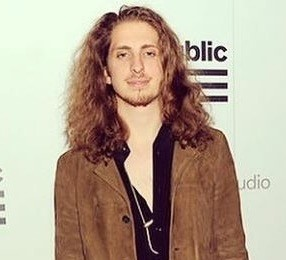
Watt in 2017

This is a list of American record producer Andrew Watt's songwriting and production credits. As a songwriter, he is also credited under his legal name Andrew Wotman.

== Discography ==
Year	Title	Album	Writer	Producer	Remix
2013	"Sinkin' In"	Cody Simpson – Surfers Paradise			
2015	"Hit the Ground"	Justin Bieber – Purpose			
2015	"Home to Mama"	Justin Bieber and Cody Simpson – Purpose (Japanese Edition)	check	check	
2016	"Rebel Nation" (featuring Andrew Watt)	Steve Angello – Wild Youth			
2016	"Let Me Love You" (featuring Justin Bieber)	DJ Snake – Encore	check	check	
2016	"Beat the Sunrise" (featuring Andrew Watt)	SNBRN – Non-album single	check		
2016	"Feeling Whitney"	Post Malone – Stoney	check	check	
2017	"Burning Man" (featuring Post Malone)	Watt – XXX: Return of Xander Cage Soundtrack	check	check	
2017	"It Ain't Me"	Kygo and Selena Gomez – Stargazing	check		
2017	"Havana" (featuring Young Thug)	Camila Cabello – Camila	check		
2017	"Comfortable" (featuring Kranium)	Bebe Rexha – All Your Fault: Pt. 2			
2017	"Let Me Go" (featuring Florida Georgia Line and Watt)	Hailee Steinfeld and Alesso – Non-album single			
2017	"Lonely Together" (featuring Rita Ora)	Avicii – Avīci (01)	check	check	
2017	"Anywhere"	Rita Ora – Phoenix	check		
2017	"The Right Way"	PartyNextDoor – Seven Days			
2017	"Wolves"	Selena Gomez and Marshmello – Non-album single	check	check	
2018	"Youngblood", "Lie To Me", "Better Man"	5 Seconds of Summer – Youngblood			
2018	"Thru Your Phone"	Cardi B – Invasion of Privacy			
2018	"Over Now", "Stay"	Post Malone – Beerbongs & Bentleys			
2018	"No Shame" (featuring PartyNextDoor)	Future – Superfly (soundtrack)			
2018	"Eastside" (with Halsey and Khalid)	Benny Blanco – Friends Keep Secrets		check	
2018	"Jet Lag", "Hard Work Pays Off"	Juice Wrld and Future – Wrld on Drugs			
2019	"Fast"	Juice Wrld – Death Race for Love			
2019	"Fuck It, I Love You"	Lana Del Rey – Norman Fucking Rockwell			
2019	"Doin' Time"	Lana Del Rey – Norman Fucking Rockwell			
2019	"Call You Mine"	The Chainsmokers and Bebe Rexha – World War Joy	check	check	
2019	"Easier", "Teeth"	5 Seconds of Summer – Calm			
2019	"Hate Me"	Ellie Goulding and Juice Wrld – Brightest Blue	check	check	
2019	"The Lay Down" (featuring H.E.R. and Watt)	DRAM – Non-album single			
2019	"Señorita"	Shawn Mendes and Camila Cabello – Shawn Mendes			
2019	"Shameless", "Liar"	Camila Cabello – Romance			
2019	"Die for Me" (featuring Future and Halsey), "Take What You Want" (featuring Ozzy Osbourne and Travis Scott)	Post Malone – Hollywood's Bleeding			
2019	"Mother"	Charlie Puth – Non-album single			
2019	"I Really Wish I Hated You"	Blink-182 – Nine			
2019	"White Mercedes"	Charli XCX – Charli			
2020	"Always You"	Louis Tomlinson – Walls			
2020	"Straight to Hell", "All My Life", "Goodbye", "Ordinary Man" (featuring Elton John), "Under the Graveyard", "Eat Me", "Today Is The End", "Scary Little Green Men", "Holy For Tonight", "It's a Raid" (featuring Post Malone)	Ozzy Osbourne – Ordinary Man	check	check	
2020	"Me and My Guitar"	A Boogie wit da Hoodie – Artist 2.0			
2020	"No Shame", "Old Me", "Best Years", "Not in the Same Way", "Lover of Mine", "Thin White Lies", "High"	5 Seconds of Summer – Calm			
2020	"Prisoner" (featuring Dua Lipa), "Edge of Midnight (Midnight Sky Remix)" (featuring Stevie Nicks), "Midnight Sky", "WTF Do I Know", "Plastic Hearts", "Angels Like You", "Gimme What I Want", "Night Crawling" (featuring Billy Idol), "Hate Me"	Miley Cyrus – Plastic Hearts	check	check	
2020	"Break My Heart"	Dua Lipa – Future Nostalgia	check	check	
2020	"Kids Again"	Sam Smith – Love Goes			
2021	"Anyone", "Hold On", "Peaches", "Can't Be Myself", "Deserve You", "Die For You" (featuring Dominic Fike), "Hailey"	Justin Bieber – Justice		check	
2021	"Talk You Down", "You", "Slow Motion", "Cowboys", "Why Do You Love Me"	Charlotte Lawrence – Charlotte			
2021	"Only Wanna Be with You (Pokémon 25 Version)"	Post Malone – Pokémon 25: The Album		check	
2021	"Can't Leave You Alone" (featuring Juice Wrld)	Maroon 5 – Jordi			
2021	"Tender Mercies"	Glen Hansard and Eddie Vedder – Flag Day (soundtrack)			
2021	"Forgot About You"	OneRepublic – Human			
2021	"Finish Line" (with Stevie Wonder), "Simple Things" (with Brandi Carlile), "Stolen Car" (with Stevie Nicks), "E-Ticket" (with Eddie Vedder), "Always Love You" (with Young Thug and Nicki Minaj)	Elton John – The Lockdown Sessions			
2021	"Hate The Game", "Fifth Day Dead"	Young Thug – Punk			
2021	"2step"	Ed Sheeran – =			
2021	"Long Way", "The Haves"	Eddie Vedder – Earthling	check	check	
2022	"Invincible", "Power of Right", "Brother the Cloud", "Fallout Today", "The Dark", "Good and Evil", "Rose of Jericho", "Try", "Picture", "Mrs. Mills", "On My Way"	Eddie Vedder – Earthling	check	check	
2022	"Wings of Stone"	Adam Levine – The Bubble (soundtrack)		check	
2022	"Thousand Miles"	The Kid Laroi – Non-album single			
2022	"2step" Remix	Ed Sheeran and Lil Baby – =			
2022	"Wrapped Around Your Finger"	Post Malone – Twelve Carat Toothache			
2022	"Patient Number 9", "Immortal", "Parasite", "No Escape From Now", "One of Those Days", "A Thousand Shades", "Mr Darkness", "Nothing Feels Right", "Evil Shuffle", "Degradation Rules", "Dead and Gone", "God Only Knows", "DARKSIDE BLUES"	Ozzy Osbourne – Patient Number 9	check	check	
2022	"Hold Me Closer"	Elton John and Britney Spears – Non-album single	check	check	
2022	"Frenzy"	Iggy Pop – Every Loser		check	
2023	"Strung Out Johnny", "New Atlantis", "Modern Day Ripoff", "Morning Show", "The News for Andy (Interlude)", "Neo Punk", "All the Way Down", "Comments", "My Animus", "The Regency"	Iggy Pop – Every Loser		check	
2023	"Die 4 Me"	Halsey – Non-album single			
2023	"How Long"	Ellie Goulding – Higher Than Heaven			
2023	"Middle Ground"	Maroon 5 – Non-album single			
2023	"Seven", "Standing Next to You"	Jungkook – Golden			
2023	"Forever and Again"	The Kid Laroi – Barbie the Album			
2023	"Don't Understand", "Something Real", "Chemical", "Novacandy", "Mourning", "Too Cool to Die", "Socialite", "Overdrive", "Speedometer", "Hold My Breath", "Buyer Beware", "Landmine", "Green Thumb", "Laugh It Off"	Post Malone – Austin	check	check	
2023	"Angry", "Get Close", "Depending on You"	The Rolling Stones – Hackney Diamonds	check	check	
2023	"Bite My Head Off" (featuring Paul McCartney), "Whole Wide World", "Dreamy Skies", "Mess It Up", "Live by the Sword" (featuring Elton John), "Driving Me Too Hard", "Tell Me Straight", "Sweet Sounds of Heaven" (featuring Lady Gaga and Stevie Wonder), "Rolling Stone Blues"	The Rolling Stones – Hackney Diamonds		check	
2024	"Scared of Fear", "React, Respond", "Wreckage", "Dark Matter", "Won't Tell", "Upper Hand", "Waiting for Stevie", "Running", "Something Special", "Got to Give", "Setting Sun"	Pearl Jam – Dark Matter	check	check	
2024	"Lovers in a Past Life"	Calvin Harris with Rag'n'Bone Man – Non-album single			
2024	"Pa No Pensar" (featuring Quavo)	Peso Pluma – Éxodo			
2024	"Save It For Later"	Eddie Vedder – The Bear Season 3			
2024	"Tough"	Quavo and Lana Del Rey – Non-album single	check	check	
2024	"Fly"	Quavo and Lenny Kravitz – Non-album single			
2024	"Room at The Top"	Eddie Vedder – Bad Monkey Season 1			
2024	"Never Too Late"	Elton John and Brandi Carlile – Elton John: Never Too Late	check	check	
2025	"Disease", "Abacadabra", "Garden of Eden", "Perfect Celebrity", "Vanish into You", "Killah" (feat. Gesaffelstein), "Zombieboy", "LoveDrug", "How Bad Do U Want Me", "Don't Call Tonight", "Shadow of a Man", "The Beast", "Blade of Grass", "Die with a Smile" (with Bruno Mars), "The Dead Dance", "Kill For Love", "Can't Stop the High"	Lady Gaga – Mayhem	check	check	
2025	"The Rose of Laura Nyro", "Little Richard's Bible", "Swing for the Fences", "You Without Me", "Who Believes in Angels", "The River Man", "A Little Light", "Someone to Belong To", "When This Old World Is Done with Me"	Elton John and Brandi Carlile – Who Believes in Angels?	check	check	
2025	"Gabriela"	Katseye – Beautiful Chaos			
2025	"Camera"	Ed Sheeran – Play			
2025	"War with Time", "Church and State", "Returning to Myself", "Human", "A Woman Oversees", "Anniversary", "Joni", "You Without Me", "No One Knows Us", "A Long Goodbye"	Brandi Carlile – Returning to Myself		check	
2025	"In the Dark"	Selena Gomez – Nobody Wants This Season 2: The Soundtrack			
2026	"I Played the Fool" (Main Title Theme from "Rooster")	Michael Stipe and Andrew Watt – Rooster: Soundtrack from the Series	check	check	
2026	"Runway" (with Doechii), "Shape of a Woman", "Glamorous Life"	Lady Gaga – The Devil Wears Prada 2: Music from the Motion Picture	check	check	
2026	"As You Lie There", "We Two", "Come Inside", "Never Know", "Home to Us"	Paul McCartney – The Boys of Dungeon Lane	check	check	
2026	"Danceteria", "L.E.S. Girl", "Danceteria Afterhours" (with Charli XCX)	Madonna – Confessions II	check	check	
2026	"Side Effects", "Back In Your Life"	The Rolling Stones – Foreign Tongues	check	check	
2026	"Rough and Twisted", "In the Stars", "Jealous Lover", "Mr Charm", "Divine Intervention", "Ringing Hollow", "Never Wanna Lose You", "Hit Me In The Head", "You Know I'm No Good", "Some Of Us", "Covered In You", "Beautiful Delilah"	The Rolling Stones – Foreign Tongues		check	
2026	"In the Stars (Cirkut and Andrew Watt Remix)"	The Rolling Stones – Official FIFA World Cup 2026 Album		check	check
