= Who Believes in Angels? =

Studio album by Elton John and Brandi Carlile
- Released: 4 April 2025
- Recorded: October 2023
- Studio: Sunset Sound (Los Angeles)
- Length: 44:08
- Label: Interscope
- Producer: Andrew Watt

Elton John chronology
The Lockdown Sessions (2021)	Who Believes in Angels? (2025)	Who Believes in Angels? (Live at the London Palladium) (2025)

Brandi Carlile chronology
In These Silent Days (2021)	Who Believes in Angels? (2025)	Returning to Myself (2025)

Singles from Who Believes in Angels?
- 1. "Who Believes in Angels?" Released: 5 February 2025; 2. "Swing for the Fences" Released: 5 March 2025

Who Believes in Angels? is a collaborative studio album by British musician Elton John and American musician Brandi Carlile. It was released on 4 April 2025, through Interscope Records. The album is produced by Andrew Watt, and was recorded at Sunset Sound Recorders in Los Angeles. The record was announced on 5 February 2025, alongside the release of its title track. It is John's thirty-third studio album and Carlile's eighth.

John and Carlile have previously collaborated on the song "Simple Things", which appears on John's collaborative album The Lockdown Sessions (2021), as well as "Never Too Late", the theme to John's 2024 documentary of the same name; the latter appears on Who Believes in Angels? In addition to Carlile, lyrics were also contributed by John's longtime songwriting partner Bernie Taupin; Watt also shares songwriting credits on the album.

The album received positive reviews by music critics, being praised both for writing and production of the songs. It was nominated at the 68th Annual Grammy Awards for Best Traditional Pop Vocal Album. Commercially it debuted at number one on the United Kingdom and Switzerland's charts, and reached the top-ten in Germany, Austria and New Zealand. In the United States, the album debuted at number nine on the Billboard 200.

== Background ==
Recording for the album began in October 2023, a process in which John, Carlile and Watt "pushed each other out of their comfort zones to write and record an album completely from scratch in just 20 days", according to a press release. Musicians contributing to the album include Red Hot Chili Peppers drummer Chad Smith, former Red Hot Chili Peppers guitarist and multi-instrumentalist Josh Klinghoffer, and session bass guitarist Pino Palladino.

John described the album as "one of the toughest I've made" and "one of the greatest musical experiences of my life." Among the struggles relating to the album is John's vision loss in relation to an eye infection. Carlile described the recording process as being in "an incredibly challenging and inspiring environment to work in, everybody throwing in ideas, everybody listening to everybody else's ideas."

== Promotion ==
The album's title track was released as the first single on 5 February 2025 alongside the announcement of the album. In addition to the single, a short film documenting the making of the song was released to YouTube on the same day. On 7 February, a music video for the single was released. Directed by David LaChapelle, the video depicts John and Carlile performing the song in a Captain Fantastic pinball machine (the design of which references John's 1975 album Captain Fantastic and the Brown Dirt Cowboy), supported by backup dancers impersonating Tina Turner and Little Richard.

John and Carlile performed a concert at the London Palladium for the CBS special An Evening with Elton & Brandi. Its soundtrack was released on vinyl as part of Record Store Day Black Friday 2025 in November.

== Critical reception ==
Professional ratings
Aggregate scores
Source	Rating
Metacritic	79/100
Review scores
Source	Rating
AllMusic	3.5/5 stars
Clash	8/10
Dork	4/5
The Independent	4/5 stars
Mojo	4/5 stars
MusicOMH	4/5 stars
The Observer	4/5 stars
Rolling Stone	3.5/5 stars
Rolling Stone UK	4/5 stars
The Telegraph	5/5 stars

According to the review aggregator Metacritic, Who Believes in Angels? received "generally favorable reviews" based on a weighted average score of 79 out of 100 from ten critic scores.

== Commercial performance ==
Who Believes in Angels? debuted at number nine on the Billboard 200 with 40,000 album-equivalent units, becoming John's twenty-second top-ten album and a fourth for Carlile. The album also debuted at number one on both the Top Rock Albums and Top Rock & Alternative Albums' charts.

The album debuted at number one on the UK Albums Chart with 22,843 album-equivalent units, becoming John's tenth album to achieve it and Carlile's first. John also joined Kylie Minogue and Michael Jackson as the fifth artist with the most topper albums on the chart.

== Track listing ==
All tracks are written by Elton John, Bernie Taupin, Brandi Carlile, and Andrew Watt; "The Rose of Laura Nyro" is additionally credited to Laura Nyro.

Who Believes in Angels? track listing
No.	Title	Length
1.	"The Rose of Laura Nyro"	6:39
2.	"Little Richard's Bible"	2:59
3.	"Swing for the Fences"	3:22
4.	"Never Too Late"	3:36
5.	"You Without Me"	4:35
6.	"Who Believes in Angels?"	5:13
7.	"The River Man"	4:41
8.	"A Little Light"	4:22
9.	"Someone to Belong To"	4:20
10.	"When This Old World Is Done with Me"	4:16
Total length:		44:08

=== Note ===
- "The Rose of Laura Nyro" contains elements of "Eli's Comin'" by Laura Nyro.

== Personnel ==
Credits adapted from the album's liner notes.

=== Musicians ===
- Elton John – vocals, piano (tracks 1–4, 6–10); Rhodes piano (5)
- Brandi Carlile – vocals (1–9), acoustic guitar (3, 8, 9), guitar (5)
- Andrew Watt – electric guitar (1–4, 6–9), acoustic guitar (1, 4, 6, 7), background vocals (3, 6–9), bass (5, 9), drums (8), pump organ (9)
- Chad Smith – drums (1–4, 6, 7, 9), percussion (2–4, 6–9)
- Pino Palladino – bass (1–4, 6–8)
- Josh Klinghoffer – synthesizers (all tracks), keyboards (1–9), organ (1, 4–9), electric guitar (1)
- James King – saxophone (1, 2, 10), flute (10)
- Ron Blake – trumpet (1, 2, 10), flugelhorn (10)

=== Technical and visuals ===
- Andrew Watt – production, Polaroids
- Paul Lamalfa – engineering
- Serban Ghenea – mixing
- Matt Colton – mastering
- Marco Sonzini – additional engineering, keyboard engineering
- Nate Haessly – engineering assistance
- Zack Zajdel – engineering assistance
- Bryce Bordone – mix engineering assistance
- Marc VanGool – studio technician
- Chris Warren – studio technician
- Chelsea Fodero – production coordination
- Andrew Koenig – production coordination
- Laura Ramsay – production coordination
- David LaChapelle – photography
- Peggy Sirota – Bernie Taupin photograph
- Mat Maitland – design
- Markus Bagå – design

== Charts ==
Chart performance for Who Believes in Angels?
Chart (2025)	Peak position
Australian Albums (ARIA)	26
Austrian Albums (Ö3 Austria)	2
Belgian Albums (Ultratop Flanders)	14
Belgian Albums (Ultratop Wallonia)	26
Canadian Albums (Billboard)	52
Croatian International Albums (HDU)	11
Dutch Albums (Album Top 100)	21
French Albums (SNEP)	42
German Albums (Offizielle Top 100)	2
Greek Albums (IFPI)	64
Irish Albums (Official Charts)	33
Italian Albums (FIMI)	46
New Zealand Albums (RMNZ)	6
Norwegian Albums (VG-lista)	75
Scottish Albums (Official Charts)	1
Swedish Physical Albums (Sverigetopplistan)	5
Swiss Albums (Schweizer Hitparade)	1
UK Albums (Official Charts)	1
US Billboard 200	9
US Top Rock & Alternative Albums (Billboard)	1
