= Returning to Myself =

2025 studio album by Brandi Carlile

Studio album by Brandi Carlile
- Released: October 24, 2025
- Recorded: 2024–2025
- Studios: Henson (Los Angeles); Gold Tooth (Los Angeles); Long Pond (Hudson Valley); Sunset Sound (Hollywood); The Hit Factory (New York City)
- Genres: Synth rock; Americana
- Length: 43:19
- Labels: Interscope; Lost Highway
- Producers: Brandi Carlile; Andrew Watt; Aaron Dessner; Justin Vernon

Brandi Carlile chronology
Who Believes in Angels? (2025)	Returning to Myself (2025)	Who Believes in Angels? (Live at the London Palladium) (2025)

Singles from Returning to Myself
- 1. "Returning to Myself" Released: September 3, 2025; 2. "A War with Time" Released: October 6, 2025; 3. "Church & State" Released: October 17, 2025

Returning to Myself is the eighth (Note: Carlile released a collaborative studio album with Elton John on 4 April 2025.) studio album by American singer-songwriter Brandi Carlile, released on October 24, 2025, via Interscope and Lost Highway. It was announced on September 3, 2025, alongside the release of the title track as the lead single and its Floria Sigismondi-directed music video.

The album was praised by music critics for its lyrics, considered "philosophical" and "spiritual", and its musical production. Commercially, it became Carlile's fifth top-ten album on the Billboard 200 in the United States and her third appearance on the UK Albums Chart.

On September 25, 2026, a deluxe version of the album, subtitled the Sad Gay Version, was released featuring re-recordings of the original ten tracks with more intimate production alongside a cover of Billy Joel's "And So It Goes".

== Background and composition ==
In 2023, after her seventh studio album In These Silent Days (2021), Brandi Carlile had started to write and record songs with Elton John, including the collaboration "Never Too Late", the theme to John's 2024 documentary of the same name, which was nominated for Best Original Song at the 97th Academy Awards. The two artists released the collaborative album Who Believes in Angels? on April 4, 2025, through Interscope Records.

Between 2024 and 2025, Carlile worked on a solo recording project with Andrew Watt, Aaron Dessner, and Justin Vernon at Long Pond Studio in the Hudson Valley and Henson Studios in Hollywood. Inspiration for Returning to Myself came from Emmylou Harris's album Wrecking Ball (1995). The song, "Church & State" was written on November 5, 2024, the night of the U.S. presidential election between Vice President Kamala Harris and former President Donald Trump. Carlile was in the studio with the Phil and Tim Hanseroth and Andrew Watt and was listening to U2's 'Bullet the Blue Sky' and wrote the "Church and State" as "a protest song, or at least reflection anthem, on what they saw going down in America." She noted, "I got a song from Tim a couple of years ago, this beautiful concept and riff and this drop-D and all of this cognitive dissonance in the song, and I sunk my teeth into it then. And I said, whatever that is, that’s a direction for where I feel like we could go musically. And then I tucked it away in the back of my mind and forgot about it until Nov. 5." The song features part of Thomas Jefferson's Thomas address to the Danbury Baptists:

I contemplate with sovereign reverence that act of the whole American people which declared that their legislature should make no law respecting an establishment of religion, or prohibiting the free exercise thereof, thus building a wall of separation between Church and State.

== Critical reception ==
Professional ratings
Aggregate scores
Source	Rating
Metacritic	82/100
Review scores
Source	Rating
AllMusic	4/5 stars
Associated Press	4/5 stars
Mojo	4/5 stars
Paste	8.7/10
Rolling Stone	3.5/5 stars
Rolling Stone UK	5/5 stars
Variety	3/3 stars

According to the review aggregator Metacritic, Returning to Myself received "universal acclaim" based on a weighted average score of 82 out of 100 from seven critic scores.

Lee Campbell of Rolling Stone UK wrote that the album "finds the singer-songwriter at her most philosophically engaged" and "at her most honest, insightful and reflective best", in which she "confronts mortality without flinching while insisting that togetherness remains our finest achievement". Marcy Donelson of AllMusic described the album "personal, especially reflective one that notably features quieter, tenderer vocal performances from Carlile", praising the "contemplative, wistfully melodic, and rooted in a bolstered folk sensibility". Alex Hopper of American Songwriter wrote that the grounding factor of Returning to Myself reflect an "an evolution" of "Carlile’s soul-touching voice and signature lyricism" and the music genere from "synth rock" to "pop".

== Commercial performance ==
Returning to Myself debuted at number seven on the Billboard 200 with 35,000 album-equivalent units, becoming Carlile's fifth top-ten album in her career, the fourth as a soloist.

Returning to Myself debuted at thirty on the UK Albums Chart, becoming Carlile's third project to chart, and her second as a solo artist after The Story (2007).

== Track listing ==
Returning to Myself track listing
No.	Title	Writer(s)	Producer(s)	Length
1.	"Returning to Myself"	Brandi Carlile	Andrew Watt; Carlile	4:17
2.	"Human"	Carlile; Phil Hanseroth; Tim Hanseroth; Watt	Carlile; Watt; Justin Vernon; Aaron Dessner	4:20
3.	"A Woman Oversees"	Carlile	Watt; Carlile	4:26
4.	"A War with Time"	Carlile; Dessner	Dessner; Watt; Carlile	4:02
5.	"Anniversary"	Carlile	Dessner; Carlile	3:55
6.	"Church & State"	Carlile	Watt; Carlile	4:18
7.	"Joni"	Carlile	Watt; Carlile	4:08
8.	"You Without Me"	Carlile; Elton John; Watt; Bernie Taupin	Watt	4:39
9.	"No One Knows Us"	Carlile; Dessner	Dessner; Carlile; Watt	4:23
10.	"A Long Goodbye"	Carlile; T. Hanseroth; P. Hanseroth; Watt	Watt; Carlile	4:47

Returning to Myself (Sad Gay Version) track listing
No.	Title	Writer(s)	Length
11.	"Human - Sad Gay Version" (featuring Jon Hopkins)	Carlile; P. Hanseroth; T. Hanseroth; Jon Hopkins; Watt	3:55
12.	"Returning to Myself - Sad Gay Version"	Carlile	4:47
13.	"You Without Me - Sad Gay Version"	Carlile; John; Taupin; Watt	4:47
14.	"No One Knows Us - Sad Gay Version"	Carlile; Dessner	4:19
15.	"Anniversary - Sad Gay Version"	Carlile	3:55
16.	"And So It Goes - Sad Gay Version"	Billy Joel	3:18
17.	"A Woman Overseas - Sad Gay Version"	Carlile	4:32
18.	"Church & State - Sad Gay Version"	Carlile; P. Hanseroth; T. Hanseroth; Watt	4:36
19.	"A War with Time - Sad Gay Version"	Carlile; Dessner	4:15
20.	"Joni - Sad Gay Version"	Carlile; P. Hanseroth; T. Hanseroth; Watt	4:10
21.	"A Long Goodbye - Sad Gay Version"	Carlile; P. Hanseroth; T. Hanseroth; Watt	5:14
Total length:			1:30:00

== Personnel ==
Credits adapted from the album's liner notes.

=== Musicians ===
- Brandi Carlile – vocals (all tracks), piano (tracks 1, 2), acoustic guitar (1, 7, 9), background vocals (2–4, 7, 9, 10); Wurlitzer, electric guitar (2); Rhodes (3), guitar (8)
- Andrew Watt – electric guitar (1–3, 9, 10), percussion (2–4, 7, 9, 10), bass (2, 4, 8), synthesizers (3, 4, 10), piano (4, 7), guitar (4)
- Justin Vernon – synthesizers (1, 2, 10), electric guitar (1, 2), piano (2, 4), acoustic guitar (2, 10), vocals (4)
- Josh Klinghoffer – synthesizers (1, 3, 4, 8, 10), pedal steel (1), electric guitar (4); keyboards, organ (8)
- Aaron Dessner – organ (1), synthesizers (2, 4, 6, 9), electric guitar (2, 4, 9), acoustic guitar (4–6, 9); percussion, piano (4, 9); drum programming (4); Mellotron, electric bass, synthesizer bass, shaker, upright piano, hi-string guitar (5, 6)
- Phil Hanseroth – bass (2, 3, 9, 10), electric guitar (2)
- Tim Hanseroth – electric guitar (2), acoustic guitar (3, 4, 10), guitar (9)
- Matt Chamberlain – drums (2, 4, 10), percussion (2, 4)
- Chad Smith – drums (2, 7, 9), percussion (2, 9)
- Dave Mackay – synthesizers, organ (2)
- Stewart Cole – French horn, trumpet (2)
- Rob Moose – strings (5, 6, 9), orchestration (5)
- SistaStrings – strings (5, 6)
- Blake Mills – fretless baritone guitar, acoustic guitar, electric guitar (7)
- Mark Isham – tenor saxophone (7)
- Elton John – Rhodes piano (8)

=== Technical ===
- Paul Lamalfa – engineering (1–4, 6–10)
- Marco Sonzini – engineering (1–4, 6, 7, 9, 10), additional engineering (8, 9)
- Andrew Watt – engineering (1–4, 6, 7, 9, 10)
- Bella Blasko – engineering (2, 4, 5, 9)
- Aaron Dessner – engineering (2, 4, 5, 9)
- Brandon Bell – engineering (2), additional engineering (5)
- Justin Vernon – engineering (2)
- Rob Moose – additional engineering (5)
- Matt Chamberlain – additional engineering (9)
- Pete Lyman – mastering (1–7, 9, 10)
- Matt Colton – mastering (8)
- Serban Ghenea – mixing
- Bryce Bordone – mix engineering

=== Art and design ===
- Catherine Carlile – creative direction
- Jacob Hassett – art direction, design
- Collier Schorr – photography
- Two Three Two Studio – photo retouching
- Maryam Malakpour – styling
- Pamela Neal – hair
- Hinako Murashige – makeup

== Charts ==
Chart performance for Returning to Myself
Chart (2025)	Peak position
Australian Albums (ARIA)	84
Austrian Albums (Ö3 Austria)	51
Belgian Albums (Ultratop Flanders)	161
Dutch Albums (Album Top 100)	93
German Albums (Offizielle Top 100)	93
Scottish Albums (Official Charts)	5
Swedish Physical Albums (Sverigetopplistan)	18
Swiss Albums (Schweizer Hitparade)	17
UK Albums (Official Charts)	30
UK Americana Albums (Official Charts)	2
US Billboard 200	7
US Americana/Folk Albums (Billboard)	1
US Top Rock & Alternative Albums (Billboard)	1
