= Who Believes in Angels? (Live at the London Palladium) =

Live album by Elton John and Brandi Carlile
- Released: 28 November 2025
- Recorded: 26 March 2025
- Venue: London Palladium (London)
- Label: Interscope
- Producer: Andrew Watt

Elton John chronology
Who Believes in Angels? (2025)	Who Believes in Angels? (Live at the London Palladium) (2025)

Brandi Carlile chronology
Returning to Myself (2025)	Who Believes in Angels? (Live at the London Palladium) (2025)	Live at Easy Street Records Vol. II (2026)

Who Believes in Angels? (Live at the London Palladium) is a live album by British musician Elton John and American musician Brandi Carlile. It was released on 28 November 2025, through Interscope Records as a Record Store Day Black Friday-exclusive release. The album contains a recording of John and Carlile's An Evening with Elton John and Brandi Carlile performance, which took place at the London Palladium on 26 March 2025. The setlist consisted of songs from the duo's collaborative album Who Believes in Angels? (2025), as well as tracks from John's solo albums and Carlile's "The Joke".

== Track listing ==
Side one
No.	Title	Writer(s)	Length
1.	"Who Believes in Angels?"	Elton John; Brandi Carlile; Andrew Watt; Bernie Taupin
2.	"Little Richard's Bible"	John; Carlile; Watt; Taupin
3.	"Swing for the Fences"	John; Carlile; Watt; Taupin
4.	"The Joke"	Carlile; Dave Cobb; Phil Hanseroth; Tim Hanseroth
5.	"Tiny Dancer"	John; Taupin

Side two
No.	Title	Writer(s)	Length
1.	"You Without Me"	John; Carlile; Watt; Taupin
2.	"Your Song"	John; Taupin
3.	"Bennie & the Jets"	John; Taupin
4.	"I'm Still Standing"	John; Taupin
5.	"Don't Let the Sun Go Down on Me"	John; Taupin

== Personnel ==
Adapted from the album's liner notes:

=== Musicians ===
- Elton John – vocals, piano
- Brandi Carlile – vocals, guitar
- Andrew Watt – guitar
- Chad Smith – drums
- Josh Klinghoffer – keyboards, synthesizer, organ, percussion
- Phil Hanseroth – bass guitar
- Tim Hanseroth – guitar

=== Technical ===
- Andrew Watt – production, mixing, engineering
- Paul LaMalfa – mixing, engineering
- Marco Sonzini – engineering
- Matt Colton – mastering

=== Packaging ===
- Ben Gibson – photography
- Mat Maitland – design
