= Mother (Charlie Puth song) =

2019 single by Charlie Puth

Single by Charlie Puth
- Released: September 12, 2019
- Length: 2:43
- Label: Artist Partner Group; Atlantic
- Songwriters: Charlie Puth; Louis Bell; Andrew Wotman; Ryan Tedder; William Walsh
- Producers: Puth; Bell; Andrew Watt

Charlie Puth singles chronology
"I Warned Myself" (2019)	"Mother" (2019)	"Cheating on You" (2019)

Music video
- "Mother" on YouTube

"Mother" is a song by American singer-songwriter Charlie Puth. It was released through Artist Partner Group and Atlantic Records as a single on September 12, 2019. Puth produced the song with Louis Bell and Andrew Watt, and they wrote it alongside Ryan Tedder and Billy Walsh. Billboard ranked it as the 74th best song of 2019.

== Background ==
Puth revealed the song's title and release date on September 4, 2019. "Mother" was written and produced by Puth, Andrew Watt, Louis Bell and Ryan Tedder. Chad Smith played drums on the track after Puth played a master for Smith while the two contributed to songs for the Ozzy Osbourne album Ordinary Man. According to Puth, the song is about a relationship that is "secretly crumbling from the inside", and that he "sometimes disguise sad lyrical sentiments with happy music".

The song and its video were released on September 12, 2019.

== Charts ==
Chart (2019)	Peak position
New Zealand Hot Singles (RMNZ)	26
San Marino (SMRRTV Top 50)	36
US Adult Pop Airplay (Billboard)	32
US Pop Airplay (Billboard)	38

== Release history ==
Country	Date	Format	Label	Ref.
Various	September 12, 2019	Digital download; streaming	Artist Partner; Atlantic	
United States	October 7, 2019	Hot Modern AC	Atlantic	
United States	October 8, 2019	Contemporary hit radio	Atlantic	
