= Days We Left Behind =

Single by Paul McCartney

from the album The Boys of Dungeon Lane
- Released: 26 March 2026
- Recorded: 2021–2025
- Studio: Hogg Hill Mill (Icklesham): Abbey Road (London); Metropolis (London); Henson (Los Angeles); Gold Tooth (Los Angeles); Diamond Dust (Los Angeles)
- Length: 3:18
- Label: Capitol
- Songwriter: Paul McCartney
- Producers: Paul McCartney; Andrew Watt

Paul McCartney singles chronology
"Let It Be" (2023)	"Days We Left Behind" (2026)	"Home to Us" (2026)

Lyric video
- "Days We Left Behind" on YouTube

"Days We Left Behind" is a song by English musician Paul McCartney released on 26 March 2026. It is the lead single for his nineteenth solo studio album The Boys of Dungeon Lane (2026), which was first officially announced (with a release date on 29 May 2026) on the day of the single's release. On 16 May 2026, McCartney performed the song on the American late-night sketch comedy show Saturday Night Live, alongside "Band on the Run" and "Coming Up".

== Reception ==
Alexis Petridis of The Guardian rated the song four out of five stars.

== Personnel ==
According to The Paul McCartney Project:

- Paul McCartney – vocals, acoustic guitar, bass, piano, pump organ

== Charts ==
Chart performance for "Days We Left Behind"
Chart (2026)	Peak position
Croatia International Airplay (Top lista)	93
Israel International Airplay (Media Forest)	16
Japan Hot Overseas (Billboard Japan)	8
Netherlands Airplay (Dutch Charts)	40
UK Singles Sales (OCC)	18
US Adult Contemporary (Billboard)	22
