= It's a Raid =

2020 single by Ozzy Osbourne featuring Post Malone

Single by Ozzy Osbourne featuring Post Malone

from the album Ordinary Man
- Released: 20 February 2020
- Recorded: 2019
- Studio: Electric Feel
- Genre: Punk metal
- Length: 4:21
- Label: Epic
- Songwriters: John Osbourne; Austin Post; Louis Bell; Chad Smith; Ali Tamposi; Andrew Wotman; Billy Walsh
- Producers: Andrew Watt; Louis Bell

Ozzy Osbourne singles chronology
"Ordinary Man" (2020)	"It's a Raid" (2020)	"Hellraiser (30th Anniversary Edition)" (2021)

Post Malone singles chronology
"Take What You Want" (2020)	"It's a Raid" (2020)	"Tommy Lee" (2020)

Music video
- "It's a Raid" on YouTube

"It's a Raid" is a song by English singer Ozzy Osbourne featuring American musician Post Malone. The song is based on an incident during the making of the Black Sabbath album Vol. 4 (1972), where, during a drug-fuelled party, Osbourne mistakenly activated a silent alarm believing the button was for the air conditioning, resulting in the police suddenly showing up. The song was written by Osbourne, Malone, Chad Smith, Ali Tamposi, and producers Andrew Watt & Louis Bell, and features guitarist Tom Morello, a personal friend of Osbourne. The track was released on 20 February 2020 as the fourth single from Osbourne's twelfth studio album, Ordinary Man (2020). It preceded the release of the album by a day. It is the second collaboration between Osbourne and Malone, after "Take What You Want" (with Travis Scott) from Malone's third studio album, Hollywood's Bleeding (2019), in September 2019.

== Personnel ==
Personnel taken from Ordinary Man CD booklet.

- Ozzy Osbourne – vocals
- Post Malone – vocals
- Andrew Watt – guitars, keyboards, bass, background vocals
- Tom Morello – guitars
- Louis Bell – keyboards
- Chad Smith – drums
- Caesar Edmunds – synth bass

== Charts ==
Chart (2020)	Peak position
US Hot Rock & Alternative Songs (Billboard)	5
