= Home to Us =

Single by Paul McCartney and Ringo Starr

from the album The Boys of Dungeon Lane
- Released: 8 May 2026
- Recorded: 2021–2025
- Genre: pop rock
- Length: 3:12
- Label: Capitol
- Songwriters: Paul McCartney; Andrew Watt
- Producers: Paul McCartney; Andrew Watt

Paul McCartney singles chronology
"Days We Left Behind" (2026)	"Home to Us" (2026)

Ringo Starr singles chronology
"Choose Love" (2026)	"Home to Us" (2026)

Lyric video
- "Home to Us" on YouTube

"Home to Us" is a single by Paul McCartney and Ringo Starr, released on 8 May 2026 by Capitol Records as the second single from McCartney's album The Boys of Dungeon Lane.

== Background and production ==
The song began in 2024 as a jam between Starr and producer Andrew Watt, who lived nearby. Starr stated, "I went down, and there was a kit in his studio, and he played guitar and we jammed" and he wanted to put it on his album Long Long Road. McCartney, who was working with Watt, heard the jam and began to create a song with it. After hearing Starr's drum track, McCartney thought, "Wow, that's really good. We should make the track that Ringo hoped, and then get it over to him and complete the circle." Starr said he expected Watt to send him the jam track, thinking of using it on his own new album, "but he never did", and Starr was surprised when Watt finally sent the version developed with McCartney and asked Starr to add more drums to the jam. McCartney said Starr was "a bit pissed [off]" at the time. Starr's vocal was initially only planned for the chorus, but McCartney asked him to sing throughout the song, saying, "We decided to give one line to me, the next line to Ringo, one line to me. It was really nice, because we've never done that."

Describing the song, McCartney said, "even though where we lived was a little rough, it was home to us."

The song features backing vocals from Chrissie Hynde and Sharleen Spiteri.

== Release ==
"Home to Us" was released by Capitol Records on 8 May 2026 as the second single from The Boys of Dungeon Lane. The release was announced in a video posted to McCartney's, Starr's, and the Beatles' social media accounts.

== Reception ==
Alexis Petridis for The Guardian praised the song as it "barrels along in a manner that vaguely recalls Oasis’s "She's Electric" [..] powered by the infectious sense that everyone involved is having a high old time".

== Personnel ==
According to The Paul McCartney Project:

- Paul McCartney – lead vocals, acoustic guitar, electric guitar, bass, piano
- Ringo Starr – lead vocals, drums, tambourine
- Andrew Watt – acoustic guitar, electric guitar
- Chrissie Hynde – backing vocals
- Sharleen Spiteri – backing vocals

== Charts ==
Chart performance for "Home to Us"
Chart (2026)	Peak position
Bolivia Anglo Airplay (Monitor Latino)	16
Croatia International Airplay (Top lista)	86
Japan Hot 100 (Billboard)	77
UK Singles Sales (OCC)	45
