= Ordinary Man (Ozzy Osbourne song) =

Single by Ozzy Osbourne featuring Elton John

from the album Ordinary Man
- Released: 10 January 2020
- Recorded: 2019
- Genre: Rock
- Length: 5:01
- Label: Epic
- Songwriters: John Osbourne; Elton John; Andrew Watt; Chad Smith; Duff McKagan; Billy Walsh
- Producer: Andrew Watt

Ozzy Osbourne singles chronology
"Straight to Hell" (2019)	"Ordinary Man" (2020)	"It's a Raid" (2020)

Elton John singles chronology
"Never Too Late" (2019)	"Ordinary Man" (2020)	"Learn to Fly" (2020)

Music video
- "Ordinary Man" on YouTube

"Ordinary Man" is a song by English musician Ozzy Osbourne, featuring fellow British musician Elton John on piano and vocals. It also features Slash on guitar, Duff McKagan on bass (both from Guns N' Roses), and Chad Smith of the Red Hot Chili Peppers on drums.

With production by Andrew Watt, the song was released on 10 January 2020 as the third single from Osbourne's twelfth studio album of the same name. It won the 2021 Planet Rock Award for Best British Single.

== Composition and lyrics ==
The song is a self-reflection on Osbourne's life and career as a musician and media personality, particularly with his struggles with substance abuse, his relationship with his wife Sharon (whom he refers to as "Mama"), and how he wishes not to die as an "ordinary man" and thus leave a legacy to everyone especially his fans amidst his declining health at the time. Osbourne said that after his first day with producer Andrew Watt in the studio, when bringing back song ideas the following day he had written "I'm just an ordinary man" and Watt "I don't want to die an ordinary man", prompting both to develop it further in this autobiographical perspective. The piano riff that Watt created made Osbourne suggest bringing in Elton John, who like himself had a meteoric rise to fame following a poor upbringing in England. Having already recorded the main musical backing alongside bassist Duff McKagan and drummer Chad Smith, Watt would add both John in vocals and piano and a guitar solo by McKagan's bandmate at Guns N' Roses, Slash. The song was then finished with an orchestra recorded at Abbey Road Studios, featuring arrangements Watt developed alongside Wil Malone.

== Personnel ==
Personnel taken from Ordinary Man CD booklet.

- Ozzy Osbourne – vocals
- Elton John – vocals, piano
- Slash – guitars
- Andrew Watt – guitars, keyboards, piano, backing vocals
- Duff McKagan – bass
- Chad Smith – drums
- Holly Laessig – backing vocals
- Jess Wolfe – backing vocals

== Charts ==
=== Weekly charts ===
Chart (2020)	Peak position
US Hot Rock & Alternative Songs (Billboard)	4

=== Year-end charts ===
Chart (2020)	Position
US Hot Rock & Alternative Songs (Billboard)	80
