= Under the Graveyard =

Single by Ozzy Osbourne

from the album Ordinary Man
- Released: 8 November 2019
- Recorded: 2019
- Genre: Heavy metal; gothic rock; blues rock
- Length: 4:57
- Label: Epic
- Songwriters: John Osbourne; Andrew Watt; Ali Tamposi; Chad Smith
- Producer: Andrew Watt

Ozzy Osbourne singles chronology
"Take What You Want" (2019)	"Under the Graveyard" (2019)	"Straight to Hell" (2019)

Music video
- "Under the Graveyard" on YouTube

"Under the Graveyard" is a power ballad by English heavy metal singer Ozzy Osbourne. Written and produced with Andrew Watt, it was released as the vocalist's first single in eight years on 8 November 2019. The song was released as the lead single of, and packaged with, Osbourne's twelfth studio album Ordinary Man in 2020, which was his first album since Scream in 2010. The song features Watt on guitar, Guns N' Roses bassist Duff McKagan and Red Hot Chili Peppers drummer Chad Smith. The song reached number one on the US Mainstream Rock chart in December 2019. The song has been described as a "massive", "booming", "searing" and "epic" power ballad by Music Mayhem, Billboard, Revolver and Ghost Cult magazines, respectively.

== Background ==
Osbourne recorded "Under the Graveyard" after working with rapper Post Malone, Travis Scott, and guitarist/producer Andrew Watt on the single "Take What You Want". The song was written by Osbourne and Watt with songwriter Ali Tamposi and drummer Chad Smith, who also performs on the track. Speaking about the recording, the vocalist commented that "Duff and Chad came in and we would go in and jam during the day and I would go work out the songs in the evenings. I previously had said to Sharon [Osbourne, Ozzy's wife and manager] I should be doing an album, but in the back of my mind I was going, 'I haven't got the fucking strength.' But Andrew pulled it out of me. I really hope people listen to it and enjoy it, because I put my heart and soul into this album."

Ozzy Osbourne was 70 years old when the song was made. He had recently faced severe life threatening illness in 2019 with a stay in intensive care for severe respiratory disease. He also was seriously injured in a fall - a leading cause of death in people of his demographic. He also had a diagnosis of Parkinson's disease - an incurable neurodegenerative disease.

== Music video ==
A music video for the song, which was teased on Osbourne's official Twitter, was released on 19 December 2019. Directed by Jonas Åkerlund, it stars actors Jack Kilmer and Jessica Barden as Ozzy and Sharon, respectively.

== Reception ==
Writing for the website Loudwire, Joe DiVita described "Under the Graveyard" as "a non-traditional song for Ozzy", claiming that "the newfound influence presents itself in the genre-hopping arrangement". DiVita went on to add that "Fuzz-drenched lead guitars, romping bass lines and alt-rock undertones make this one hard to define. The frontman's performance is strong and reflective, admitting past mistakes while exposing vulnerability and inner conflict."

== Personnel ==
- Ozzy Osbourne – vocals
- Andrew Watt – guitar, bass, keyboards, backing vocals, production
- Chad Smith – drums & percussion
- Charlie Puth – keyboards
- Happy Perez – keyboards, additional instrumentation and programming
- Caesar Edmunds – additional instrumentation and programming

== Charts ==
=== Weekly charts ===
Chart (2019–2020)	Peak position
New Zealand Hot Singles (RMNZ)	29
Scottish Singles Sales (Official Charts)	77
US Hot Rock & Alternative Songs (Billboard)	3

=== Year-end charts ===
Chart (2020)	Position
US Hot Rock & Alternative Songs (Billboard)	41

== Certifications ==
Region	Certification	Certified units/sales
Canada (Music Canada)	Gold	40,000^{‡}
^{‡} Sales+streaming figures based on certification alone.
