= Patient Number 9 =

Studio album by Ozzy Osbourne
- Released: 9 September 2022
- Recorded: 2021–2022
- Genres: Heavy metal; hard rock
- Length: 61:10
- Label: Epic
- Producer: Andrew Watt

Ozzy Osbourne chronology
Ordinary Man (2020)	Patient Number 9 (2022)

Singles from Patient Number 9
- 1. "Patient Number 9" Released: 24 June 2022; 2. "Degradation Rules" Released: 22 July 2022; 3. "Nothing Feels Right" Released: 5 September 2022; 4. "One of Those Days" Released: 9 September 2022; 5. "A Thousand Shades" Released: 14 February 2023

Patient Number 9 is the thirteenth and final studio album by the English heavy metal singer Ozzy Osbourne. It was released on 9 September 2022 through Epic Records and was produced by Andrew Watt. Clocking in at 61 minutes and 10 seconds, Patient Number 9 is also the longest studio album that Osbourne released as a solo artist.

Patient Number 9 received favourable reviews from music critics and won Best Rock Album at the 65th Annual Grammy Awards. It was ranked as the 9th best guitar album of 2022 by Guitar World readers.

== Background and promotion ==
Four days after the release of Ordinary Man, Osbourne announced that he had started working on its follow-up, with Andrew Watt returning as producer. On 24 June 2022, the lead single and title track, "Patient Number 9" featuring Jeff Beck, was released along with an accompanying music video. The music video was directed by Todd McFarlane and M. Wartella. The clip is the first-ever video to incorporate Osbourne's hand-drawn artwork. "My demons were animated and can be seen during the Jeff Beck guitar solo in the song," wrote Osbourne on Twitter. The track subsequently debuted at No. 1 on Billboard's Hot Hard Rock Songs chart, while concurrently achieving debuts of Nos. 17 and 22 on Billboard's Hot Rock Songs and Hot Rock & Alternative Songs, respectively. At the same time, Osbourne announced the album, cover, track listing and release date.

The second single "Degradation Rules", featuring Osbourne's former Black Sabbath bandmate Tony Iommi, was unveiled on 22 July. Four days before the album release, on 5 September, the third single "Nothing Feels Right" featuring Zakk Wylde was published. Osbourne performed during the halftime show at the Los Angeles Rams' NFL season opener against the Buffalo Bills on 8 September in support of the album.

== Critical reception ==
Professional ratings
Aggregate scores
Source	Rating
Metacritic	75/100
Review scores
Source	Rating
AllMusic	4/5 stars
The Arts Desk	4/5 stars
Classic Rock	4/5 stars
The Guardian	4/5 stars
The Independent	3/5 stars
Kerrang!	4/5
Metal Hammer	4/5 stars
NME	4/5 stars
The Telegraph	4/5 stars
Uncut	3/5 stars

According to the review aggregator Metacritic, Patient Number 9 received "generally favorable reviews" based on a weighted average score of 75 out of 100 from ten critic scores.

AllMusic critic Fred Thomas gave the album a mostly positive review. He wrote: "Even with that fatalistic perspective sometimes peeking through, Ozzy sounds hypercharged throughout Patient Number 9, continuing the unlikely late-in-the-game comeback he began on Ordinary Man, and besting that album by taking more chances."

Furthermore, writing for The Guardian, Alexis Petridis gave the album an overall positive review, implying that "By way of contrast, Patient Number 9 draws to a close with God Only Knows, a beautiful stadium rock ballad that features Osbourne contemplating his own mortality in terms that are alternately starkly affecting."

Kerrang! gave the album 4 out of 5 and stated: "If nothing else, it's pleasing to see Ozzy still carrying on and still being the Prince of Darkness. But Patient Number 9 is also, like its predecessor, a massive celebration of life and friendship and the magic power of music. 'I'll never die, because I'm immortal!' he announces on Immortal. He sounds it."

Metal Hammer gave the album a positive review and stated: "Despite everything you may have heard about Ozzy being on his last legs, Patient Number 9 unequivocally does not sound like the work of a man living on borrowed time. Instead, it sounds like the Prince of fucking Darkness having an absolutely smashing time, with a bunch of his mates and, weirdly, a newfound sense of artistic ambition."

NME writer Rhian Daly gave Patient Number 9 four stars out of five and stated: "At 73 years old and battling with his health, you might not expect Osbourne to keep that bar particularly high. But, for the most part, Patient Number 9 does just that – it's a fizzing piece of hard-rock magic. The superstitious metal frontman might have revealed in a recent Independent interview that he tries to "avoid looking at" the number 13, but we're lucky to have his magnificent 13th solo album."

Gareth Williams of Wall of Sound gave the album a positive review, saying that "There's no disguising one of rock's more unique voices and the singer sounds as good as he has in years. Although this album doesn't break any new ground it is streaks ahead of the likes of 2007's Black Rain or Scream from 2010. With Ordinary Man having blasted up the mainstream charts in 2020, Patient Number 9 won't be far behind."

At the 65th Annual Grammy Awards, Patient Number 9 received a total of four nominations, including Best Rock Album. The title track "Patient Number 9" received nominations for Best Rock Song and Best Rock Performance, and "Degradation Rules" was nominated for Best Metal Performance. The album would go on to win two Grammys, including Best Rock Album and Best Metal Performance for "Degradation Rules". This win makes it the third Grammy Award that Ozzy Osbourne and Tony Iommi won together, after previously winning two as members of Black Sabbath.

== Track listing ==
Patient Number 9 track listing
No.	Title	Writer(s)	Length
1.	"Patient Number 9" (featuring Jeff Beck)	John Osbourne; Andrew Wotman; Robert Trujillo; Chad Smith; Ali Tamposi	7:21
2.	"Immortal"	Osbourne; Wotman; Smith; Tamposi; Duff McKagan	3:03
3.	"Parasite"	Osbourne; Wotman; Trujillo; Tamposi; Taylor Hawkins	4:05
4.	"No Escape from Now" (featuring Tony Iommi)	Osbourne; Wotman; Smith; Tamposi; Iommi	6:46
5.	"One of Those Days" (featuring Eric Clapton)	Osbourne; Wotman; Smith; Tamposi; McKagan	4:40
6.	"A Thousand Shades" (featuring Jeff Beck)	Osbourne; Wotman; Smith; Tamposi; Ryan Tedder	4:26
7.	"Mr. Darkness"	Osbourne; Wotman; Trujillo; Tamposi; Hawkins	5:35
8.	"Nothing Feels Right"	Osbourne; Wotman; Smith; Tamposi; Chris Chaney	5:35
9.	"Evil Shuffle"	Osbourne; Wotman; Trujillo; Smith; Tamposi	4:10
10.	"Degradation Rules" (featuring Tony Iommi)	Osbourne; Wotman; Smith; Trujillo; Iommi	4:10
11.	"Dead and Gone"	Osbourne; Wotman; Trujillo; Smith; Tamposi	4:32
12.	"God Only Knows"	Osbourne; Wotman; Tamposi; Hawkins	5:00
13.	"Darkside Blues"	Osbourne; Wotman	1:47
Total length:			61:10

Notes

- The vinyl edition of the album features "Immortal" as the first track and "Patient Number 9" as the second.
- An early version of "Darkside Blues" previously appeared as a Japanese bonus track on Osbourne's previous album Ordinary Man.

== Personnel ==
Credits adapted from official booklet

Solo band members

- Ozzy Osbourne – lead vocals, harmonica (tracks 10, 13)
- Zakk Wylde – guitars (tracks 1–3, 6–9, 11, 12), keyboards (tracks 1, 5, 7, 9), organ (track 8)

Additional musicians

- Andrew Watt – guitars (tracks 1–3, 5–13), bass (tracks 4, 6, 7, 9, 12), keyboards (tracks 1, 5–7, 11, 12), piano (tracks 3, 6, 12), backing vocals, production
- Jeff Beck – guitars (tracks 1, 6)
- Tony Iommi – guitars (tracks 4, 10)
- Mike McCready – guitars, backing vocals (track 2)
- Eric Clapton – guitars, backing vocals (track 5)
- Josh Homme – guitars, backing vocals (track 12)
- Robert Trujillo – bass (tracks 1, 3, 7, 9–12)
- Duff McKagan – bass, backing vocals (tracks 2, 5)
- Chris Chaney – bass (track 8)
- Chad Smith – drums (tracks 1, 2, 4–6, 8–11), percussion (track 6)
- Taylor Hawkins – drums (tracks 3, 7, 12), percussion (track 3)
- James Poyser – organ (track 5)
- David Campbell – strings arrangement (tracks 6, 11)
- Charlie Bisharat – violin (tracks 6, 11)
- Roberto Cani – violin (track 6)
- Mario DeLeon – violin (track 6)
- Nina Evtuhov – violin (track 6)
- Songa Lee – violin (tracks 6, 11)
- Natalie Leggett – violin (tracks 6, 11)
- Philipp Levy – violin (track 6)
- Alyssa Park – violin (track 6)
- Michele Richards – violin (track 6)
- Neil Samples – violin (tracks 6, 11)
- Jennifer Takamatsu – violin (track 6)
- Kerenza Peackock – violin (track 11)
- Sara Parkins – violin (track 11)
- Andrew Duckles – viola (tracks 6, 11)
- Zachary Dellinger – viola (track 6)
- David Walther – viola (tracks 6, 11)
- Jacob Braun – cello (tracks 6, 11)
- Paula Hochhalter – cello (tracks 6, 11)
- Ross Gasworth – cello (track 6)

== Charts ==
=== Weekly charts ===
Weekly chart performance for Patient Number 9
Chart (2022)	Peak position
Australian Albums (ARIA)	2
Austrian Albums (Ö3 Austria)	2
Belgian Albums (Ultratop Flanders)	7
Belgian Albums (Ultratop Wallonia)	6
Canadian Albums (Billboard)	1
Czech Albums (ČNS IFPI)	1
Danish Albums (Hitlisten)	9
Dutch Albums (Album Top 100)	6
Finnish Albums (Suomen virallinen lista)	2
French Albums (SNEP)	14
German Albums (Offizielle Top 100)	2
Hungarian Albums (MAHASZ)	2
Irish Albums (Official Charts)	22
Italian Albums (FIMI)	2
Japanese Albums (Oricon)	10
Japanese Hot Albums (Billboard Japan)	12
New Zealand Albums (RMNZ)	6
Norwegian Albums (VG-lista)	4
Polish Albums (ZPAV)	2
Portuguese Albums (AFP)	10
Scottish Albums (Official Charts)	2
Spanish Albums (Promusicae)	8
Swedish Albums (Sverigetopplistan)	2
Swedish Hard Rock Albums (Sverigetopplistan)	1
Swiss Albums (Schweizer Hitparade)	3
UK Albums (Official Charts)	2
UK Rock & Metal Albums (Official Charts)	1
US Billboard 200	3
US Top Alternative Albums (Billboard)	1
US Top Hard Rock Albums (Billboard)	1
US Top Rock Albums (Billboard)	1
US Indie Store Album Sales (Billboard)	1

=== Year-end charts ===
Year-end chart performance for Patient Number 9
Chart (2022)	Position
Austrian Albums (Ö3 Austria)	74
German Albums (Offizielle Top 100)	35
Polish Albums (ZPAV)	80
Swiss Albums (Schweizer Hitparade)	46
US Hard Rock Albums	24

== Ozzy Osbourne: No Escape From Now documentary ==
Ozzy Osbourne: No Escape From Now, a 2025 film that documents the final six years of Osbourne's life including the recording of Patient Number 9, streamed on Paramount+ on 7 October 2025.
