= The Boys of Dungeon Lane =

Studio album by Paul McCartney
- Released: 29 May 2026
- Recorded: 2021–2025
- Studios: Hogg Hill Mill (Icklesham): Abbey Road (London); Metropolis (London); Henson (Los Angeles); Gold Tooth (Los Angeles); Diamond Dust (Los Angeles)
- Genre: Pop rock
- Length: 47:07
- Label: Capitol
- Producers: Paul McCartney; Andrew Watt

Paul McCartney chronology
| Man on the Run (Music from the Motion Picture Soundtrack) (2026) | The Boys of Dungeon Lane (2026) |

Paul McCartney studio album chronology
| McCartney III (2020) | The Boys of Dungeon Lane (2026) |

Singles from The Boys of Dungeon Lane
- 1. "Days We Left Behind" Released: 26 March 2026; 2. "Home to Us" Released: 8 May 2026

The Boys of Dungeon Lane is the twentieth solo studio album by English musician Paul McCartney, released on 29 May 2026 through Capitol Records. Co-produced with Andrew Watt in sessions dating back to 2021, it was announced on 26 March 2026 along with the release of its lead single, "Days We Left Behind". Its second single, "Home to Us", is a duet with his former Beatles bandmate, Ringo Starr.

McCartney extensively promoted The Boys of Dungeon Lane, conducting interviews with publications and appearing on numerous talk shows. Upon release, the album received critical acclaim, with many critics commenting positively on its nostalgic and reflective tone. The album charted at number one in Belgium, Denmark, the Netherlands, Scotland, and the United Kingdom. A special edition of the album, including three previously unreleased songs, was released digitally on 7 October 2026.

== Background ==
"The boys of Dungeon Lane" was a lyric used by McCartney in the song "In Liverpool", a 1991 demo. Dungeon Lane is a road in the Speke area of Liverpool, and the album is generally inspired by McCartney's childhood memories in the area. The lane leads from Speke to Oglet Shore on the Mersey, an area that was popular with birdwatchers. Before the album's announcement, McCartney teased it using bird emojis on his social media.

On 25 March 2026, McCartney's brother Mike made a social media post about posters being put up around Liverpool featuring the artwork for the album, and stating that his son, Josh, was the designer. The artwork is inspired by Liverpool's street signs and features the Speke postcode L24.

== Production ==
The album is co-produced by Andrew Watt. McCartney and Watt first met in 2021, and their first recording session together resulted in the album opener "As You Lie There". McCartney played the majority of instruments. It was recorded in sessions between legs of his Got Back tour, spanning five years and alternating between Los Angeles and McCartney's Hogg Hill Mill studio in East Sussex.

"Home to Us" features Ringo Starr on drums and vocals, with backing vocals by Chrissie Hynde and Sharleen Spiteri.

== Promotion and release ==
The lead single, "Days We Left Behind", was released on 26 March 2026. Early promotion of the album included updated Google Street View imagery of Dungeon Lane. On 16 April, McCartney, along with Watt, hosted an early listening party for a select group of 30 fans at Watt's studio in Los Angeles. On 5 May, McCartney hosted another album listening party at Abbey Road Studios.

The second single, "Home to Us", was released on 8 May, and the album was released on 29 May. Jacaranda Records hosted the first public listening event of the album on 22 May at its flagship venue The Jacaranda, a bar and club long associated with McCartney's early musical career.

McCartney underwent an extensive promotional campaign for The Boys of Dungeon Lane. He hosted his first-ever TikTok live and made appearances on the YouTube series Chicken Shop Date, the BBC Radio 2 show Tracks of My Years, Saturday Night Live, the final episode of The Late Show with Stephen Colbert and the podcast The Rest Is History. He also had conversations with Zane Lowe for Apple Music and with Paul Mescal, who is portraying McCartney in the upcoming The Beatles – A Four-Film Cinematic Event, for Amazon Music; McCartney also conducted a cover story with Mojo magazine, and interviews with the publications The New York Times and The Guardian. Forbes senior contributor Andy Meek noted how McCartney's promotion for the album reflected an ongoing shift in promotional cycles from print journalism to direct-to-audience media. On 10 June, McCartney appeared at the Roundhouse in London for In Conversation with Paul McCartney, a listening party during which he was interviewed by Rob Brydon.

A special edition of the album, including three previously unreleased songs from the albums' sessions, was announced on 1 October 2026, and released digitally on 7 October.

== Critical reception ==
Professional ratings
Aggregate scores
| Source | Rating |
|---|---|
| AnyDecentMusic? | 7.8/10 |
| Metacritic | 84/100 |
Review scores
| Source | Rating |
| AllMusic | 4.5/5 stars |
| Classic Rock | 3.5/5 stars |
| Financial Times | 4/5 stars |
| The Guardian | 4/5 stars |
| The Independent | 4/5 stars |
| Mojo | 4/5 stars |
| Pitchfork | 7.2/10 |
| Record Collector | 4/5 stars |
| Rolling Stone | 4.5/5 stars |
| The Times | 4/5 stars |

According to the review aggregator Metacritic, The Boys of Dungeon Lane received "universal acclaim" based on a weighted average score of 84 out of 100 from nineteen critic scores. The review aggregator Any Decent Music gave the album a weighted average score of 7.8 out of 10 from nineteen critic scores.

Variety's Chris Willman declared it his best album of the 21st century, and "absolutely the best album ever recorded and released by a rock star in his 80s." In Rolling Stone, Simon Vozick-Levinson called it a "late-career masterpiece", Neil McCormick of The Daily Telegraph wrote, "The Boys of Dungeon Lane is certainly as good as anything [McCartney] has given us in the last 50 years." Alexis Petridis of The Guardian wrote that the album feels "noticeably more purposeful than a lot of his 21st-century output", being more thematically tied than previous records New (2013) and Egypt Station (2018). The Independent's Roisin O'Connor and Vozick-Levinson called The Boys of Dungeon Lane an improvement over those albums.

Several noted the age in McCartney's voice, but believed he used it to his advantage, with AllMusic's Matt Collar writing that "he remains as eternally young as ever with just a hint of his 83 years adding gravitas to the softer ballads." John Murphy of MusicOMH wrote that his voice "holds up remarkably well given his age", noting that it makes the melancholic tone of tracks like "Days We Left Behind" "sound even more moving". Similarly, Record Collector reviewer Daryl Easlea stated, "The vulnerability in his voice adds a peculiar charm: it’s a man looking at an ever-decreasing road ahead with his trademark optimism."

Critics commented on the album's nostalgic and reflective tone. (Note: Attributed to multiple references:) Writing for Paste magazine, Ryan Reed wrote, "Two Paul McCartneys are battling for space on The Boys of Dungeon Lane. ... The first is an unabashed nostalgist, a genteel romantic. ... The other is, thankfully, a wild man—the same spirit that animated everything from the absurdist studio tinkering of 'You Know My Name (Look Up the Number)' to the clanging folk curiosity 'Wild Honey Pie'." Several critics praised Watts's production, comparing the music to McCartney's 1970s works with Wings, as well as Ram (1971) and Flaming Pie (1997). McCartney's songwriting was also highlighted. O'Connor said that, under Watts's guidance, McCartney's songwriting "sounds particularly rejuvenated", delivering "some of his most personal and introspective songwriting in years".

Not all reviews were positive. NME's Jordan Bassett believed that, although a press release promised "a collection of rare and revealing glimpses into memories never-before shared," The Boys of Dungeon Lane did not quite live up to the promise. In a more mixed review, Classic Rock magazine's Pat Carty believed that the album was not a "late-period masterpiece", having "its moments" but lacking many "memorable" tunes. Petridis and Pitchfork's Ben Cardew argued that not every song is a success, with the latter called the album overall an "underwhelming win" and a "low-stakes kind of triumph". In another mixed review for The Line of Best Fit, Tom Rainbow said that McCartney revisits familiar musical ideas without offering anything new. He further said some of the tracks sounded tailored to meet audience expectations, with "generic love songs, mid-tempo rockers, and just enough Beatles references to soundtrack his fanbase's Facebook Reels and TikToks."

== Commercial performance ==
The Boys of Dungeon Lane debuted at number 5 on the US Billboard 200 chart, becoming McCartney's 22nd top 10 album on the chart. It also debuted at number one on the Indie Store Album Sales chart, earning 63,000 album-equivalent units for the week ending 4 June 2026. In the UK, it topped the UK Albums Chart, Official Album Sales and Official Vinyl Sales charts.

== Track listing ==
All tracks are written by Paul McCartney, except where noted.

The Boys of Dungeon Lane track listing
| No. | Title | Writer(s) | Length |
|---|---|---|---|
| 1. | "As You Lie There" | Paul McCartney; Andrew Watt | 4:45 |
| 2. | "Lost Horizon" | | 3:04 |
| 3. | "Days We Left Behind" | | 3:18 |
| 4. | "Ripples in a Pond" | | 2:43 |
| 5. | "Mountain Top" | | 3:40 |
| 6. | "Down South" | | 2:23 |
| 7. | "We Two" | McCartney; Watt | 3:01 |
| 8. | "Come Inside" | McCartney; Watt | 3:14 |
| 9. | "Never Know" | McCartney; Watt | 4:15 |
| 10. | "Home to Us" (with Ringo Starr) | McCartney; Watt | 3:12 |
| 11. | "Life Can Be Hard" | | 3:15 |
| 12. | "First Star of the Night" | | 2:57 |
| 13. | "Salesman Saint" | | 3:19 |
| 14. | "Momma Gets By" | | 4:04 |
| Total length: | | | 47:07 |

iTunes version
| No. | Title | Length |
|---|---|---|
| 15. | "First Star of the Night" (demo) | 2:30 |
| Total length: | | 49:36 |

Special edition track listing
| No. | Title | Writer(s) | Length |
|---|---|---|---|
| 15. | "City Fox" | | 2:39 |
| 16. | "One Night Stand" | | 3:16 |
| 17. | "Chelsea Boots" | | 2:58 |
| 18. | "Home to Us" (Flip Mix) (with Ringo Starr) | McCartney; Watt | 3:14 |
| Total length: | | | 59:18 |

== Personnel ==
Credits are adapted from Tidal.

- Paul McCartney – vocals (all tracks); acoustic guitar (tracks 1–13), bass guitar (1–5, 7–14), electric guitar (1, 2, 4–7, 9, 10, 12, 13), drums (1, 2, 4, 5, 7–9, 11–13), piano (1, 3, 5, 8–11, 14), synthesizer (1, 5, 11), percussion (1, 5, 12), harpsichord (1, 5), shaker (1, 11), Rhodes (1), pump organ (3), maracas (4, 5, 11), Wurlitzer electronic piano (5, 8, 9), magnetic tape treatments (5, 9), tambourine (5, 11–13); bongos, Moog bass (5); Mellotron (7, 9, 11, 13), hand claps (8, 13); organ, recorder (9); spinet (13), nylon-string guitar (14)
- Andrew Watt – electric guitar (1, 7, 9), synthesizer (1, 4, 10, 11), Wurlitzer electronic piano (1), Mellotron (4), tambourine (4, 8, 9), acoustic guitar (8, 10, 11), maracas (8), drums (9), magnetic tape treatments (9)
- Ringo Starr – tambourine (1, 10); vocals, drums (10)
- Mike Davis – trumpet (4, 13)
- Nancy McCartney – spoken word (5)
- Chrissie Hynde – background vocals (10)
- Sharleen Spiteri – background vocals (10)
- Ben Foster – conductor, co-arrangement (11, 13, 14)
- Giles Martin – co-arrangement (11, 13, 14)

Production

- Paul McCartney – production
- Andrew Watt – production
- Paul Lamalfa – engineering, mixing
- Steve Orchard – engineering, mixing
- Keith Smith – engineering assistance
- Neil Dawes – engineering assistance
- Randy Merrill – mastering
- Ryan Smith – mastering
- Marc VanGool – technician

== Charts ==
=== Weekly charts ===
Weekly chart performance for The Boys of Dungeon Lane
| Chart (2026) | Peak position |
|---|---|
| Australian Albums (ARIA) | 5 |
| Austrian Albums (Ö3 Austria) | 2 |
| Belgian Albums (Ultratop Flanders) | 1 |
| Belgian Albums (Ultratop Wallonia) | 1 |
| Canadian Albums (Billboard) | 25 |
| Croatian International Albums (HDU) | 1 |
| Danish Albums (Hitlisten) | 1 |
| Dutch Albums (Album Top 100) | 1 |
| Finnish Albums (Suomen virallinen lista) | 8 |
| French Albums (SNEP) | 4 |
| French Rock & Metal Albums (SNEP) | 1 |
| German Albums (Offizielle Top 100) | 2 |
| German Rock & Metal Albums (Offizielle Top 100) | 2 |
| Greek Albums (IFPI) | 61 |
| Hungarian Physical Albums (MAHASZ) | 37 |
| Irish Albums (Official Charts) | 8 |
| Italian Albums (FIMI) | 10 |
| Japanese Albums (Oricon) | 11 |
| Japanese Combined Albums (Oricon) | 11 |
| Japanese Rock Albums (Oricon) | 1 |
| Japanese Top Albums Sales (Billboard Japan) | 11 |
| New Zealand Albums (RMNZ) | 9 |
| Norwegian Albums (IFPI Norge) | 7 |
| Polish Albums (ZPAV) | 7 |
| Portuguese Albums (AFP) | 36 |
| Scottish Albums (Official Charts) | 1 |
| Spanish Albums (Promusicae) | 7 |
| Swedish Albums (Sverigetopplistan) | 3 |
| Swiss Albums (Schweizer Hitparade) | 2 |
| UK Albums (Official Charts) | 1 |
| US Billboard 200 | 5 |
| US Top Rock & Alternative Albums (Billboard) | 2 |

=== Monthly charts ===
Monthly chart performance for The Boys of Dungeon Lane
| Chart (2026) | Position |
|---|---|
| Japanese Albums (Oricon) | 25 |
| Japanese Rock Albums (Oricon) | 2 |
