= Take What You Want =

Song by Post Malone featuring Ozzy Osbourne and Travis Scott

Single by Post Malone featuring Ozzy Osbourne and Travis Scott

from the album Hollywood's Bleeding and Ordinary Man (bonus track)
- Released: September 5, 2019
- Recorded: 2019
- Studio: Electric Feel
- Genre: Emo rap; rap rock; hip-hop; pop
- Length: 3:50
- Label: Republic
- Songwriters: Austin Post; John Osbourne; Jacques Webster II; Louis Bell; Andrew Watt; William Walsh
- Producers: Andrew Watt; Louis Bell

Post Malone singles chronology
"Writing on the Wall" (2019)	"Take What You Want" (2019)	"It's a Raid" (2020)

Ozzy Osbourne singles chronology
"Let It Die" (2011)	"Take What You Want" (2019)	"Under the Graveyard" (2019)

Travis Scott singles chronology
"Highest in the Room" (2019)	"Take What You Want" (2019)	"Hot (Remix)" (2019)

"Take What You Want" is a song by American musician Post Malone featuring British singer Ozzy Osbourne and American rapper Travis Scott. Written alongside Billy Walsh and producers Louis Bell & Andrew Watt, the song appears on the former's third studio album, Hollywood's Bleeding (2019), later appearing as a bonus track on Osbourne's twelfth studio album Ordinary Man (2020). The song was serviced to US contemporary hit radio on October 15, 2019, as the sixth single from the aforementioned album.

It is the first collaboration between Malone and Osbourne, which was later followed by Osbourne's single, "It's a Raid", from his album Ordinary Man in February 2020. An official live performance video was released to promote the single. In his autobiography Last Rites, Osbourne detailed that his daughter Kelly Osbourne met producer Andrew Watt, who for knowing Malone was a fan of Osbourne and Black Sabbath suggested her a collaboration. Given Osbourne had barely left his house for months following a fall at his Los Angeles home that forced him to delay concerts of his farewell tour, Kelly brought him the idea while also reminding Osbourne that he had liked Malone's song "Sunflower". Osbourne recorded his parts at Watt's home studio in Beverly Hills, taking four to five hours and only "two or three takes", with Malone only present through FaceTime from his Utah home given he had just finished a tour. Osbourne credited the experience with lifting his spirits and leading him to record a whole album with Watt.

"Take What You Want" peaked at number eight on the US Billboard Hot 100.

The track was featured in the opening video package for Game 7 of the 2019 World Series in addition to the official trailer for the reboot for supernatural superhero film, The Crow.

== Commercial performance ==
"Take What You Want" became Malone's ninth top 10 on the Billboard Hot 100, debuting at number eight and becoming Osbourne's first Billboard Hot 100 top 10 in over 30 years, making it the longest gap between top 10 appearances.

== Personnel ==
Credits adapted from Tidal.

- Post Malone – principal vocalist, songwriting
- Ozzy Osbourne – vocalist, songwriting
- Travis Scott – vocalist, songwriting
- Andrew Watt – production, songwriting, lead guitar
- Louis Bell – recording, production, vocal production
- Billy Walsh – songwriting
- Chad Smith – drums
- Paul Lamalfa – recording
- Manny Marroquin – mixing
- Chris Galland – mixing assistance
- Robin Florent – mixing assistance
- Scott Desmarais – mixing assistance
- Mike Bozzi – mastering

== Charts ==
Chart (2019–2020)	Peak position
Australia (ARIA)	30
Canada Hot 100 (Billboard)	8
Canada Rock (Billboard)	48
Czech Republic Singles Digital (ČNS IFPI)	18
Denmark (Tracklisten)	19
France (SNEP)	154
Greece International (IFPI)	39
Hungary (Stream Top 40)	6
Ireland (IRMA)	37
Italy (FIMI)	44
Latvia (LAIPA)	17
Lithuania (AGATA)	20
Netherlands (Single Top 100)	37
New Zealand (Recorded Music NZ)	30
Norway (VG-lista)	12
Portugal (AFP)	38
Slovakia Singles Digital (ČNS IFPI)	10
Sweden (Sverigetopplistan)	24
UK Singles (Official Charts)	22
US Billboard Hot 100	8
US Pop Airplay (Billboard)	36
US Rock & Alternative Airplay (Billboard)	28
US Rolling Stone Top 100	2

2025 chart performance for "Take What You Want"
Chart (2025)	Peak position
Global 200 (Billboard)	192
Russia Streaming (TopHit)	100
US Hot Rock & Alternative Songs (Billboard)	16

== Certifications ==
Region	Certification	Certified units/sales
Australia (ARIA)	2× Platinum	140,000^{‡}
Brazil (Pro-Música Brasil)	Diamond	160,000^{‡}
Canada (Music Canada)	5× Platinum	400,000^{‡}
Denmark (IFPI Danmark)	Gold	45,000^{‡}
France (SNEP)	Gold	100,000^{‡}
Italy (FIMI)	Gold	35,000^{‡}
New Zealand (RMNZ)	Platinum	30,000^{‡}
Poland (ZPAV)	Gold	25,000^{‡}
Portugal (AFP)	Gold	5,000^{‡}
United Kingdom (BPI)	Platinum	600,000^{‡}
United States (RIAA)	2× Platinum	2,000,000^{‡}
^{‡} Sales+streaming figures based on certification alone.

== Release history ==
Region	Date	Format	Label	Ref.
Various	September 6, 2019	Digital download; streaming	Republic	
United States	October 15, 2019	Contemporary hit radio	Republic	
