= Hold Me Closer (Elton John and Britney Spears song) =

2022 single by Elton John and Britney Spears

Single by Elton John and Britney Spears

from the album The Lockdown Sessions (reissue)
- Released: 26 August 2022
- Recorded: July 2022
- Studio: Andrew Watt's studio (Beverly Hills, CA)
- Genre: Disco
- Length: 3:22
- Label: EMI
- Songwriters: Elton John; Bernie Taupin; Andrew Wotman; Henry Walter
- Producers: Andrew Watt; Cirkut

Elton John singles chronology
"Sausage Rolls for Everyone" (2021)	"Hold Me Closer" (2022)	"Never Too Late" (2024)

Britney Spears singles chronology
"Matches" (2020)	"Hold Me Closer" (2022)	"Mind Your Business" (2023)

Music video
- "Hold Me Closer" on YouTube

Music video
- "Hold Me Closer (Joel Corry Remix)" on YouTube

Music video
- "Hold Me Closer (Acoustic)" on YouTube

"Hold Me Closer" is a song recorded by British singer Elton John and American singer Britney Spears. It was released as a single on 26 August 2022, through EMI. The song combines elements from John's songs "Tiny Dancer" (1971), "The One" (1992), and "Don't Go Breaking My Heart" (1976). It appears on the digital reissue of John's collaborative album The Lockdown Sessions (2021). The song marked Spears' first new musical release in six years and her first release after the termination of her controversial conservatorship.

"Hold Me Closer" had a polarised critical reception while achieving commercial success upon release. It topped the charts in five countries, including Australia, Hungary and the Commonwealth of Independent States, and reached the top ten in 19 countries, including the United Kingdom and the United States.

== Background ==
I'm so excited to be able to do it with [Britney] because if it is a big hit, and I think it may be, it will give her so much more confidence than she's got already and she will realise that people actually love her and care for her and want her to be happy [...] She's been away so long – there's a lot of fear there because she's been betrayed so many times and she hasn't really been in the public eye officially for so long. We've been holding her hand through the whole process, reassuring her that everything's gonna be alright.

— John on collaborating with Spears on the song and supporting and reassuring her, The Guardian

News about a collaboration between the two artists first broke in late July 2022. On 8 August, John confirmed the collaboration, calling it a remake of his 1972 single "Tiny Dancer". He also released a promotional artwork featuring the song's title with a rose and rocket emoji – referencing Spears' regular use of the former on social media as well as her "Project 1 Rose" selfie montage, and John's popular nickname "Rocket Man"—and shared the song's pre-save link. On 19 August, the single was officially announced, along with its release date. On 22 August, John shared a snippet of the song on his social media. He also performed a snippet of the song at the restaurant "La Guérite" in Cannes, on 23 August, as a surprise to diners, which he livestreamed on his social media. The day after, Spears posted a snippet of the song on her social media, revealing new elements of John's 1992 single "The One" in the duet, and thanked him for having her on the record. That same day, John released an animated teaser for the song's audio visualiser.

Ahead of the song's release, Spears described it as "a big deal" and "pretty damn cool [to be] singing with one of the most classic men of our time". She stated that she felt "overwhelmed". Spears reportedly completed recording her vocals for the song in less than two hours. The duet also interpolates John's 1976 single "Don't Go Breaking My Heart". The single marks Spears' first musical release since "Matches" (2020) as well as her return to music after the termination of her conservatorship. John revealed that his husband, David Furnish, first suggested him to collaborate with Spears on the song; the former believed the project would "boost" her confidence after a "traumatic time". Record producer Andrew Watt praised Spears's dedication towards the project, despite her musical hiatus, saying she "was so prepared. She had spent time with the record and knew how she wanted to do it." He further stated the song "meant so much to [Spears], and you can hear it in her vocal performance. She's singing her ass off."

== Release ==
The single's artwork was unveiled on 19 August, with the song's official announcement. It depicts both artists as children, with Spears in a ballet costume and John sitting at a piano. The Evening Standard's Elizabeth Gregory thought that the artwork "points towards a desired spirit of innocence and freedom."

"Hold Me Closer" was released on 26 August to digital download and streaming platforms; an animated audio visual was uploaded to John's YouTube channel. The single was sent for radio airplay in Italy by Universal Music that same day. On 29 August, it was serviced to adult contemporary radio and its hot AC and modern AC sub-formats, in the United States by Interscope Records. The song further impacted contemporary hit radio in the U.S. via Interscope, the day after.

An animated lyric video for the song featuring a CGI rocket flying in the air while ejecting roses, was released on 6 September 2022.

== Critical reception ==
Upon release, "Hold Me Closer" had a polarised reception from music critics and fans. The Guardian's Michael Cragg rated the song four out of five stars, praising Spears' "engaged delivery coating the ghostly shimmers of John's original vocals". He further wrote: "Both 'The One', which makes up the verses, and 'Tiny Dancer' evoke a sense of having found someone, or something, with the power to transform a life. A totem to hold on to and believe in. On 'Hold Me Closer', Spears seems to hint at finding that for herself again in music." Mary Siroki of Consequence called the song "dreamy and delightful", saying that it "strikes as an instant-classic because, in the literal sense, it already is — we all know the melody and the key lyrics by heart, but the new contributions from Spears provide a present-day spin that gives a new life to the original tune." According to Robin Murray of Clash, the track is "a neat, astute, carefully finessed piece of pop music". Billboard's Stephen Daw opined that the "dance floor-ready production" makes the song "an excellent jam worthy of the icons performing it", and highlighted Spears's vocals as "phenomenal". In the Evening Standard, Elizabeth Gregory found it "an emotional summer-end hit", which is "defiant in its breeziness. There's an undercurrent of sadness but here the good times triumph." Mikael Wood of the Los Angeles Times described it as "a bop, a banger, a vibe. [...] That you can’t really tell their voices apart thanks to the buckets of Auto-Tune only makes their pairing that much sweeter."

Calling it "one of the most pointless records in pop history", The Daily Telegraph's Neil McCormick rated the song one out of five stars, saying that it misses "Britney's signature sass and with her vocals barely audible, this horrible mash-up of two Elton songs is a baffling 'comeback'." He also compared the song unfavourably to John's duet with Dua Lipa, "Cold Heart (Pnau remix)" (2021), which also mashed up older songs by John, thinking that "lightning has not struck twice". In another one-star review, Will Hodgkinson of The Times thought that "Hold Me Closer" was "a massive opportunity wasted", where "all the soul has been stripped away" from John's "Tiny Dancer" and "John and Spears's voices have been treated in a way that makes them sound like they might dissolve into the background entirely". Ed Power of The Irish Times also deemed it "a missed opportunity" which "sounds like dance-floor fodder from a regional nightclub circa 1997", while finding Spears' "vocals so low in the mix that you have to check twice to confirm she's there. Britney is the ghost haunting her own comeback." Chloe Stilwell on Mic opined that the track "isn't necessarily bad", but "leaves a lot to be desired", saying that "putting 'Tiny Dancer' through an autotune car wash wasn't what we needed. That's probably the biggest problem with the song: it's so edited that John and Spears both sound like robots, and using that effect on such a classic song comes across as jarring and lazy." Lyric Waiwiri-Smith of New Zealand news media Stuff found it "uninspring", and "a glitchy rework of John's classic Tiny Dancer with some barely audible Spears vocals". For The A.V. Club's Gabrielle Sanchez, "Hold Me Closer" is "a tepid offering that fails to utilize everything Spears brings to the table as a pop star", nevertheless she noted that it "serves as a triumphant victory lap regarding the end of her lengthy conservatorship".

== Commercial performance ==
"Hold Me Closer" was met with commercial success upon release. It debuted at number three on the UK singles chart on the week ending 2 September 2022, becoming Spears' 24th top-ten single and highest-charting song since "Scream & Shout" (2012), while earning John his 35th top-ten single. As of 31 August 2022, "Hold Me Closer" has sold 22,295 copies in the United Kingdom. In January 2025, it was certified platinum by the British Phonographic Industry (BPI) for track-equivalent sales of 600,000 units.

In Australia, the song debuted at number one, becoming Spears' first number-one single in the country since "Everytime" (2004), as well as her sixth overall, and it marked John's fifth number-one single on the chart.

On 6 September 2022, the song debuted at number six on the US Billboard Hot 100 chart, becoming Spears' 14th top-ten single on the chart, as well as John's 29th. With this, Spears became the 12th artist to have top-ten entries in four decades (1990s, 2000s, 2010s, and 2020s). The single debuted at number one on the Billboard Hot Dance/Electronic Songs chart, becoming the third song in the history of the chart to do so. It managed to sell 48,000 copies in its first week of release, followed by another 11,000 copies in its second week of release. As of 15 May 2023, "Hold Me Closer" has sold 111,000 digital downloads and has generated 124.6 million streams in the United States.

== Music videos ==
The original music video for "Hold Me Closer" premiered via John's YouTube channel on YouTube on 27 September 2022. It was directed by Ukrainian director Tanu Muino, who described her experience working on the visual an "emotional" moment; she grew up listening to both artists. She further said that the music video of Spears' 2001 single "I'm a Slave 4 U" inspired her to become a music video director. A second music video was released for the English DJ Joel Corry remix of the song on 23 October 2022. It was directed by Rebekah Creative and produced by Greatcoat Films. On 18 November 2022, a third music video was released for the acoustic version of "Hold Me Closer". It was directed by Tristan Nash and features American ice skater Nathan Chen.

== Accolades ==
Accolades received by "Hold Me Closer"
Year	Award	Category	Results	Ref.
2022	NRJ Music Awards	International Collaboration of the Year	Nominated	
2022	People's Choice Awards	The Collaboration Song of 2022	Nominated	
2023	Electronic Dance Music Awards	Dance Song of the Year (Radio)	Nominated	
2023	Electronic Dance Music Awards	Remix of the Year	Won	
2023	Billboard Music Awards	Top Dance/Electronic Song	Nominated	
2023	BreakTudo Awards	International Collaboration of the Year	Nominated	

== Usage in media ==
A portion of "Hold Me Closer" was featured in the first episode of the second season of the HBO Max series, And Just Like That... (2023).

== Track listings ==
- Digital download and streaming
1. "Hold Me Closer" – 3:22
- Digital download (Joel Corry remix)
1. "Hold Me Closer" (Joel Corry remix) – 4:08
- Streaming (Joel Corry remix)
1. "Hold Me Closer" (Joel Corry remix) – 4:08
2. "Hold Me Closer" – 3:22
- Digital download (Purple Disco Machine remix)
1. "Hold Me Closer" (Purple Disco Machine remix) – 3:38
2. "Hold Me Closer" (Purple Disco Machine extended mix) – 5:54
- Streaming (Purple Disco Machine remix)
1. "Hold Me Closer" (Purple Disco Machine remix) – 3:38
2. "Hold Me Closer" (Purple Disco Machine extended mix) – 5:54
3. "Hold Me Closer" – 3:22
- Digital download (Pink Panda remix)
1. "Hold Me Closer" (Pink Panda remix) – 3:01
2. "Hold Me Closer" (Pink Panda extended mix) – 3:52
- Streaming (Pink Panda remix)
1. "Hold Me Closer" (Pink Panda remix) – 3:01
2. "Hold Me Closer" (Pink Panda extended mix) – 3:52
3. "Hold Me Closer" – 3:22
- Digital download (acoustic)
1. "Hold Me Closer" (acoustic) – 3:22
- Streaming (acoustic)
1. "Hold Me Closer" (acoustic) – 3:22
2. "Hold Me Closer" – 3:22
- CD single 1 (with extended mix)
1. "Hold Me Closer" – 3:22
2. "Hold Me Closer" (extended mix)
- CD single 2 (with Joel Corry remix)
1. "Hold Me Closer" – 3:22
2. "Hold Me Closer" (Joel Corry remix) – 4:08
- CD single 3 (with Purple Disco Machine remix)
1. "Hold Me Closer" – 3:22
2. "Hold Me Closer" (Purple Disco Machine remix) – 3:38

== Credits and personnel ==
- Elton John – vocals, songwriting, piano, keyboards
- Britney Spears – vocals
- Bernie Taupin – songwriting
- Andrew Watt – keyboards, bass guitar, guitar, drums, songwriting
- Cirkut – keyboards, programming, songwriting
- Randy Merrill – mastering
- Şerban Ghenea – mixing
- Bryce Bordone – assistant mixer
- Paul LaMalfa – recording engineer

== Charts ==
=== Weekly charts ===
Weekly chart performance
Chart (2022–2023)	Peak position
Argentina Hot 100 (Billboard)	100
Australia (ARIA)	1
Austria (Ö3 Austria Top 40)	23
Belarus Airplay (TopHit)	9
Belgium (Ultratop 50 Flanders)	5
Belgium (Ultratop 50 Wallonia)	4
Bolivia (Monitor Latino)	11
Brazil Airplay (Top 100 Brasil)	57
Bulgaria (PROPHON)	9
Canada Hot 100 (Billboard)	3
Canada AC (Billboard)	1
Canada CHR/Top 40 (Billboard)	7
Canada Hot AC (Billboard)	1
Chile Airplay (Monitor Latino)	12
CIS Airplay (TopHit)	1
Croatia International Airplay (HRT)	1
Czech Republic Singles Digital (ČNS IFPI)	98
Denmark (Tracklisten)	36
El Salvador (ASAP EGC)	8
Estonia Airplay (TopHit)	9
Finland Airplay (Radiosoittolista)	10
France (SNEP)	65
Germany (GfK)	31
Germany Airplay (German Airplay Chart)	1
Global 200 (Billboard)	6
Greece International (IFPI)	54
Hungary (Rádiós Top 40)	19
Hungary (Single Top 40)	1
Iceland (Tónlistinn)	2
Ireland (IRMA)	2
Israel Airplay (Media Forest)	1
Italy (FIMI)	74
Japan Hot Overseas (Billboard Japan)	3
Kazakhstan Airplay (TopHit)	42
Latvia Airplay (LAIPA)	11
Lebanon (Lebanese Top 20)	5
Lithuania (AGATA)	28
Lithuania Airplay (TopHit)	6
Luxembourg (Billboard)	22
Malaysia International (RIM)	9
Mexico Anglo (Monitor Latino)	3
Netherlands (Dutch Top 40)	10
Netherlands (Single Top 100)	33
New Zealand (Recorded Music NZ)	4
Nigeria (TurnTable Top 100)	60
Norway (VG-lista)	23
Paraguay (Monitor Latino)	8
Panama (PRODUCE)	34
Poland Airplay (ZPAV)	2
Portugal (AFP)	41
Romania Airplay (TopHit)	45
Russia Airplay (TopHit)	2
San Marino Airplay (SMRRTV Top 50)	7
Slovakia Airplay (ČNS IFPI)	11
Slovakia Singles Digital (ČNS IFPI)	75
South Africa Airplay (TOSAC)	2
South Africa Streaming (TOSAC)	54
Spain Airplay (PROMUSICAE)	10
Sweden (Sverigetopplistan)	21
Switzerland (Schweizer Hitparade)	7
Ukraine Airplay (TopHit)	72
UK Singles (Official Charts)	3
US Billboard Hot 100	6
US Adult Contemporary (Billboard)	4
US Adult Pop Airplay (Billboard)	1
US Hot Dance/Electronic Songs (Billboard)	1
US Pop Airplay (Billboard)	10
Venezuela (Record Report)	38

Weekly chart performance
Chart (2026)	Peak position
Jamaica Airplay (JAMMS)	7

=== Monthly charts ===
Monthly chart performance
Chart (2022–2023)	Peak position
Belarus Airplay (TopHit)	10
CIS Airplay (TopHit)	2
Estonia Airplay (TopHit)	13
Kazakhstan Airplay (TopHit)	47
Lithuania Airplay (TopHit)	8
Paraguay Airplay (SGP)	24
Romania Airplay (TopHit)	51
Russia Airplay (TopHit)	4
Ukraine Airplay (TopHit)	92

=== Year-end charts ===
Year-end chart performance
Chart (2022)	Position
Belgium (Ultratop 50 Flanders)	59
Belgium (Ultratop 50 Wallonia)	60
Canada (Canadian Hot 100)	66
Chile (Monitor Latino)	76
CIS Airplay (TopHit)	43
Croatia International Airplay (Top lista)	60
Hungary (Single Top 40)	39
Netherlands (Dutch Top 40)	37
Poland (ZPAV)	54
Russia Airplay (TopHit)	56
Switzerland (Schweizer Hitparade)	92
US Adult Contemporary (Billboard)	20
US Adult Top 40 (Billboard)	30
US Hot Dance/Electronic Songs (Billboard)	8

Chart (2023)	Position
Belarus Airplay (TopHit)	86
Belgium (Ultratop 50 Flanders)	91
Canada (Canadian Hot 100)	51
CIS Airplay (TopHit)	107
Estonia Airplay (TopHit)	45
Hungary (Dance Top 40)	75
Lithuania Airplay (TopHit)	37
US Adult Contemporary (Billboard)	5
US Adult Top 40 (Billboard)	27
US Hot Dance/Electronic Songs (Billboard)	2
US Radio Songs (Billboard)	71

Chart (2025)	Position
Argentina Anglo Airplay (Monitor Latino)	78

== Certifications and sales ==
Certifications and sales for "Hold Me Closer"
Region	Certification	Certified units/sales
Australia (ARIA)	Gold	35,000^{‡}
Austria (IFPI Austria)	Platinum	30,000^{‡}
Belgium (BRMA)	Gold	20,000^{‡}
Brazil (Pro-Música Brasil)	Gold	20,000^{‡}
Canada (Music Canada)	3× Platinum	240,000^{‡}
Denmark (IFPI Danmark)	Platinum	90,000^{‡}
France (SNEP)	Platinum	200,000^{‡}
Germany (BVMI)	Gold	300,000^{‡}
Italy (FIMI)	Platinum	100,000^{‡}
New Zealand (RMNZ)	2× Platinum	60,000^{‡}
Poland (ZPAV)	Platinum	50,000^{‡}
Spain (Promusicae)	Platinum	60,000^{‡}
Switzerland (IFPI Switzerland)	Gold	10,000^{‡}
United Kingdom (BPI)	Platinum	600,000^{‡}
United States (RIAA)	Platinum	1,000,000^{‡} / 111,000
^{‡} Sales+streaming figures based on certification alone.

== Release history ==
Release dates and formats for "Hold Me Closer"
Region	Date	Format(s)	Version(s)	Label(s)	Ref.
Various	26 August 2022	Digital download; streaming	Original	EMI	
Italy	26 August 2022	Radio airplay	Original	Universal	
United States	29 August 2022	AC radio; hot AC radio; modern AC radio	Original	Interscope	
United States	30 August 2022	Contemporary hit radio	Original	Interscope	
Various	7 October 2022	Digital download; streaming	Joel Corry remix	EMI	
Various	21 October 2022	Digital download; streaming	Purple Disco Machine remix	EMI	
Various	4 November 2022	Digital download; streaming	Pink Panda remix	EMI	
Various	18 November 2022	Digital download; streaming	Acoustic	EMI	
Various	18 November 2022	CD	Original; extended	EMI	
Various	18 November 2022	CD	Original; Joel Corry remix	EMI	
Various	18 November 2022	CD	Original; Purple Disco Machine remix	EMI	

== See also ==
- List of number-one singles of 2022 (Australia)
- List of Billboard number-one dance songs of 2022
