= Ordinary Man (Ozzy Osbourne album) =

2020 album by Ozzy Osbourne

Studio album by Ozzy Osbourne
- Released: 21 February 2020
- Recorded: 2019
- Studios: Gold Tooth (Beverly Hills); Abbey Road (London); SARM (London)
- Genres: Heavy metal; hard rock; glam metal
- Length: 49:21
- Label: Epic
- Producers: Andrew Watt; Louis Bell

Ozzy Osbourne chronology
Memoirs of a Madman (2014)	Ordinary Man (2020)	Patient Number 9 (2022)

Singles from Ordinary Man
- 1. "Under the Graveyard" Released: 8 November 2019; 2. "Straight to Hell" Released: 22 November 2019; 3. "Ordinary Man" Released: 10 January 2020; 4. "It's a Raid" Released: 20 February 2020

Ordinary Man (stylised as ØRD†NARY MAN) is the twelfth studio album by the English heavy metal singer Ozzy Osbourne. The album features guest appearances from Elton John, Post Malone and Travis Scott. It was released on 21 February 2020 through Epic Records. It was produced by Andrew Watt and Louis Bell. The album marks the first time that Osbourne collaborated with Watt and Bell. It also marks the longest gap between two albums from Osbourne, spanning almost ten years since Scream. The first single of the album, "Under the Graveyard", was released on 8 November 2019. The second single, "Straight to Hell", was released on 22 November 2019. The third single and title track featuring singer Elton John was released on 10 January 2020. The fourth single "It's a Raid" featuring Post Malone was released on 20 February 2020, a day before the release of the album.

The album received mainly positive reviews, with many considering it Osbourne's best album in years and favourably comparing it to both his early solo work and Black Sabbath.

Four days after the album's release, Osbourne announced that he had started working on its follow-up, with Andrew Watt returning as producer. The follow-up was announced as Patient Number 9 and was released on 9 September 2022. A re-recorded version of the Japanese bonus track "Darkside Blues" later appeared as the closing track on the album.

== Background ==
Ordinary Man is Osbourne's first studio album as a solo artist in ten years following Scream (2010). It is also his first album overall since he reunited with Black Sabbath's Tony Iommi and Geezer Butler for their final album 13 (2013), with him as lead singer. After the release of 13, they went on a farewell tour titled The End Tour, which ended in Birmingham, England on 4 February 2017. After Black Sabbath concluded their farewell tour, Osbourne kept working on new material and started a farewell tour for his solo career, No More Tours II. However, concerts were constantly delayed by medical issues. As Osbourne barely left his house for months after a fall in February 2019 that forced him to undergo neck and spinal surgery, his daughter Kelly Osbourne brought him the suggestion to work with rapper Post Malone, as Kelly had befriended Malone's producer Andrew Watt, who in turn brought up the idea of the collaboration given Malone's lifelong fandom of Osbourne and Black Sabbath. Osbourne then went to Watt's studio in Beverly Hills to record a guest appearance in Malone's song "Take What You Want", which went on to become Osbourne's first Billboard Hot 100 top 10 in over 30 years, thus making it the longest gap between top 10 appearances in the chart's history. With the experience having lifted his spirits after a long inactivity, Osbourne decided to make a whole album with Watt. As Osbourne would note upon announcing the album in November, "I previously had said to Sharon I should be doing an album, but in the back of my mind I was going, 'I haven't got the fucking strength.' But Andrew pulled it out of me. I really hope people listen to it and enjoy it, because I put my heart and soul into this album."

== Recording ==
Watt got together with Guns N' Roses bassist Duff McKagan and Red Hot Chili Peppers drummer Chad Smith, and after four days created many demos to show Osbourne. Osbourne would then go to Watt's studio for three weeks to develop the song ideas, which Watt described as "Evil Beatles" in having a "balance of melody and heaviness". Speaking about the recording, Osbourne commented that the entire album process was done "in just a short time", adding "Duff and Chad came in and we would go in and jam during the day and I would go work out the songs in the evenings." He would note that "I saw Andrew do in seconds things that Sabbath would have taken three years, a million quid and a pound of cocaine to do." Osbourne brought in a ARP 2600 synthesizer he had kept since the 1970s, and wrote songs reminiscing on his life, with "It's a Raid" recalling when Osbourne had to interrupt a drug-fuelled party with Black Sabbath after accidentally calling the police, and title track "Ordinary Man" having a story of "a guy like me who'd come from a working class background, he'd become famous very quickly, and he's singing at the end of his life, looking back, not sure how or why he's still alive, and hoping he doesn't die without money and unknown, like he started". "Ordinary Man" featured both Elton John on piano and vocals and a guitar solo by Slash, and "It's a Raid" had Malone and guitarist Tom Morello.

== Critical reception ==
Professional ratings
Aggregate scores
Source	Rating
AnyDecentMusic?	7.4/10
Metacritic	78/100
Review scores
Source	Rating
AllMusic	4/5 stars
Clash	7/10
Consequence of Sound	B
Evening Standard	4/5 stars
Exclaim!	7/10
The Guardian	3/5 stars
musicOMH	3.5/5 stars
NME	5/5 stars
Rolling Stone	3.5/5 stars
Sputnikmusic	3.3/5

Ordinary Man received generally positive reviews from contemporary music critics. At Metacritic, which assigns a normalised rating out of 100 to reviews from mainstream publications, the album received an average score of 78, based on 15 reviews, indicating "generally favorable reviews". Aggregator AnyDecentMusic? gave it 7.4 out of 10, based on their assessment of the critical consensus.

AllMusic critic Fred Thomas gave the album a mostly positive review, writing that although it had a few weaker songs, it was Osbourne's best album in years. He wrote: "The production is huge but the energy is spontaneous, sounding like it was as fun to make as it is to listen to. 71 years old at the time Ordinary Man was released, Osbourne's voice is in great shape, sounding more or less like he always has. How he's making music this strong after riding the crazy train for more than half-a-century is anyone's guess, but the better songs here rank among his best." Josh Gray of Clash wrote that "Ordinary Man is far from perfect, but all Ozzy Osbourne's solo releases tend to reflect their creator's flaws to one degree or another. It does, however, absolutely succeed on its own terms, serving its purpose by reminding the world just what we'll miss when this titan among titans finally departs us for good." He also complimented the energy Osbourne expresses on the album. Spencer Kaufman of Consequence of Sound gave the album a positive review, praising Osbourne's vocals as well as the album's "musicianship", although stating that "songs like 'Goodbye', 'Eat Me', and 'Scary Little Green Men' get lost in the shuffle". Kaufman also stated that he was a bit disappointed that Osborne's longtime guitarist Zakk Wylde wasn't involved in the making of the album. Writing for Evening Standard, Harry Fletcher praised the album, complimenting Osbourne's vocals as well as the features on the album. Joe Smith-Engelhardt of Exclaim! gave Ordinary Man a positive review, saying that it was one of the most captivating albums Osbourne has made in years and "despite small flaws with select songs, he's created another record worthy of people's attention." Writing for musicOMH, Ross Horton was positive towards the album, stating that it is "just another Ozzy Osbourne solo album, for better and worse. It succeeds in its rawness, its slapdash cobbling together of predictable riffs and lunatic poetry."

NME writer Jordan Bassett gave Ordinary Man a perfect score, writing that several songs on the album were reminiscent of Osbourne's old band, Black Sabbath, and that he was having "an absolute ball" on the record. Conversely, writing for Rolling Stone, Kory Grow gave the album a positive review, saying that "Some of the songs are elegiac, some are packed with comic-book laughs, but throughout the album he [Osbourne] sings with a youthful vivacity that seems at odds with his 70-something years. His goofball songs are more lighthearted than ever, and his more serious songs sound even more thoughtful." Grow also mentions that Osbourne's "voice aches is incredibly moving" and that the tender moments of the album makes it a "keeper". Furthermore, writing for The Guardian, Michael Hann gave the album an overall mixed review, implying that "Ordinary Man may have its lachrymose moments lyrically", although stating that the album "perhaps" has "too few memorable songs". A.D. Amorosi of Variety gave the album a positive review, saying that it contains "More hard rock than rough metal, and more lavishly produced (by Andrew Watt, of Cardi B's Invasion of Privacy, and Post Malone's Beerbongs & Bentleys fame) than Ozzy's sludge-glam sound of his past". Furthermore, he believe that Ordinary Man "is like driving a clown car through a wake. It's great, fast fun even when it's sad".

Metal Hammer named it as the 32nd best metal album of 2020.

== Commercial performance ==
Ordinary Man debuted at number 3 on the US Billboard 200 with 77,000 equivalent units, including 65,000 pure album sales. This is Osbourne's eighth top ten album on the chart as a solo artist and equals the peak of his 2007 album Black Rain. The album also debuted at number 3 on the UK Albums Chart, his highest-ever solo placing on the chart.

== Track listing ==
Ordinary Man track listing
No.	Title	Writer(s)	Length
1.	"Straight to Hell"	John Osbourne; Chad Smith; Andrew Wotman	3:45
2.	"All My Life"	Osbourne; Smith; Duff McKagan; Alexandra Tamposi; Wotman	4:18
3.	"Goodbye"	Osbourne; Smith; McKagan; Tamposi; Wotman	5:34
4.	"Ordinary Man" (featuring Elton John)	Osbourne; John; Smith; McKagan; William Walsh; Wotman	5:01
5.	"Under the Graveyard"	Osbourne; Smith; McKagan; Tamposi; Wotman	4:57
6.	"Eat Me"	Osbourne; Smith; McKagan; Tamposi; Wotman	4:19
7.	"Today Is the End"	Osbourne; Smith; Tamposi; Wotman	4:06
8.	"Scary Little Green Men"	Osbourne; Smith; McKagan; Tamposi; Wotman	4:20
9.	"Holy for Tonight"	Osbourne; Smith; McKagan; Tamposi; Wotman	4:52
10.	"It's a Raid" (featuring Post Malone)	Osbourne; Austin Post; Louis Bell; Smith; Tamposi; Wotman	4:20

CD, cassette and digital edition bonus track
No.	Title	Writer(s)	Length
11.	"Take What You Want" (Post Malone featuring Ozzy Osbourne and Travis Scott)	Osbourne; Post; Jacques Webster II; Walsh; Wotman; Bell	3:49
Total length:			49:21

Japanese bonus track
No.	Title	Writer(s)	Length
12.	"Darkside Blues"	Osbourne; Wotman	1:47
Total length:			51:14

== Personnel ==
Personnel taken from Ordinary Man CD booklet.

- Ozzy Osbourne – vocals (all tracks), harmonica (track 6)

Additional musicians

- Andrew Watt – guitars (tracks 1–10), background vocals (tracks 1–8, 10), keyboards (tracks 2, 4–10), piano (track 4), bass (tracks 5, 7, 10), programming and all instruments (track 11); production (all tracks), string arrangements (tracks 4, 9), choir arrangement (tracks 1, 4, 9), back cover photography
- Louis Bell – keyboards (track 10), programming and all instruments (track 11); production (track 11), engineering (track 11), vocal production (track 11)
- Duff McKagan – bass (tracks 1–4, 6, 8, 9)
- Chad Smith – drums (tracks 1–10), percussion (tracks 1–9)
- Slash – guitars (tracks 1, 4)
- Caesar Edmunds – synth bass programming (track 1), synth bass (tracks 2, 3, 6, 9, 10), additional instrumentation & programming (tracks 5, 8); mixing assistance (tracks 1–10)
- Tom Morello – guitars (tracks 8, 10)
- Charlie Puth – keyboards (tracks 1, 2, 5, 9)
- Elton John – vocals & piano (track 4)
- Post Malone – vocals (tracks 10, 11)
- Travis Scott – vocals (track 11)
- Kelly Osbourne – background vocals (track 6)
- Charlie Schein – guitar (track 8)
- Happy Perez – keyboards (tracks 5, 7, 8), additional instrumentation and programming (tracks 5, 7, 8); additional production (tracks 5, 7)
- Ali Tamposi – vocals
- Holly Laessig – background vocals (tracks 1, 4, 9)
- Jess Wolfe – background vocals (tracks 1, 4, 9)
- London Voices – choir (tracks 1, 4, 9)
  - Ben Parry – chorus master
  - Terry Edwards – chorus master
  - Sara Davey – soprano
  - Grace Davidson – soprano
  - Sarah Eyden – soprano
  - Joanna Forbes L'Estrange – soprano
  - Hannah Cooke – alto
  - Amy Lyddon – alto
  - Jo Marshall – alto
  - Clara Sanabras – alto
  - John Bowen – tenor
  - Richard Eteson – tenor
  - Christopher Hann – tenor
  - Gareth Treseder – tenor
  - Michael Dore – bass
  - John Evanson – bass
  - Nicholas Garrett – bass
  - Peter Snipp – bass
- Perry Montague-Mason – violin (tracks 4, 9)
- Tom Pigott-Smith – violin (tracks 4, 9)
- Boguslav Kostecki – violin (tracks 4, 9)
- Steve Morris – violin (tracks 4, 9)
- Mark Berrow – violin (tracks 4, 9)
- Gaby Lester – violin (tracks 4, 9)
- Jackie Hartley – violin (tracks 4, 9)
- Patrick Kiernan – violin (tracks 4, 9)
- Christopher Tombling – violin (tracks 4, 9)
- John Bradbury – violin (tracks 4, 9)
- Everton Nelson – violin (tracks 4, 9)
- Deborah Widdup – violin (tracks 4, 9)
- Lizzie Ball – violin (tracks 4, 9)
- Dorina Markoff – violin (tracks 4, 9)
- Peter Lale – viola (tracks 4, 9)
- Julia Knight – viola (tracks 4, 9)
- Susan Dench – viola (tracks 4, 9)
- Andy Parker – viola (tracks 4, 9)
- Ian Burdge – cello (tracks 4, 9)
- Vicky Matthews – cello (tracks 4, 9)
- Chris Worsey – cello (tracks 4, 9)
- Nick Cooper – cello (tracks 4, 9)
- Stacey Watton – double bass (tracks 4, 9)
- Richard Pryce – double bass (tracks 4, 9)

Additional personnel

- Paul LaMalfa – engineering (all tracks)
- Matt Still – engineering (tracks 4, 9)
- Andrew Dudman – orchestra engineering (tracks 4, 9)
- Dominik Gryzbon – engineering assistance (tracks 4, 9)
- George Oulton – orchestra engineering assistance (tracks 4, 9)
- Matt Jones – orchestra engineering assistance (tracks 4, 9)
- Kevin Peterson – mastering engineering assistance
- Mike Bozzi – mastering (track 11)
- Dave Kutch – mastering
- Alan Moulder – mixing (tracks 1–10)
- Manny Marroquin – mixing (track 11)
- Tom Herbert – mixing assistance (tracks 1–10)
- Chris Galland – mixing assistance (track 11)
- Robin Florent – mixing assistance (track 11)
- Scott Desmarais – mixing assistance (track 11)
- Jeremie Inhaber – mixing assistance (track 11)
- Wil Malone – choir arrangement (tracks 1, 4, 9), string arrangements (tracks 4, 9), string conduction (tracks 4, 9)
- Amy Stewart – strings conduction (tracks 4, 9)
- Jon Contino – illustrations
- Jeff Schulz – art direction, design
- Sam Taylor-Johnson – photography

== Charts ==
=== Weekly charts ===
Chart performance for Ordinary Man
Chart (2020)	Peak position
Australian Albums (ARIA)	4
Austrian Albums (Ö3 Austria)	2
Belgian Albums (Ultratop Flanders)	18
Belgian Albums (Ultratop Wallonia)	11
Canadian Albums (Billboard)	3
Czech Albums (ČNS IFPI)	1
Danish Albums (Hitlisten)	16
Dutch Albums (Album Top 100)	18
Estonian Albums (Eesti Tipp-40)	16
Finnish Albums (Suomen virallinen lista)	3
French Albums (SNEP)	34
German Albums (Offizielle Top 100)	2
Hungarian Albums (MAHASZ)	5
Irish Albums (Official Charts)	22
Italian Albums (FIMI)	6
Japanese Albums (Oricon)	10
New Zealand Albums (RMNZ)	12
Norwegian Albums (VG-lista)	3
Norwegian Vinyl Albums (VG-lista)	1
Polish Albums (ZPAV)	3
Portuguese Albums (AFP)	3
Scottish Albums (Official Charts)	2
Spanish Albums (Promusicae)	3
Swedish Albums (Sverigetopplistan)	1
Swiss Albums (Schweizer Hitparade)	2
UK Albums (Official Charts)	3
US Billboard 200	3
US Top Hard Rock Albums (Billboard)	1
US Top Rock Albums (Billboard)	1

=== Year-end charts ===
2020 year-end chart performance for Ordinary Man
Chart (2020)	Position
German Albums (Offizielle Top 100)	58
Polish Albums (ZPAV)	71
Swiss Albums (Schweizer Hitparade)	86
US Billboard 200	199
US Top Rock Albums (Billboard)	37

== Certifications ==
Region	Certification	Certified units/sales
Canada (Music Canada)	Gold	40,000^{‡}
Poland (ZPAV)	Gold	10,000^{‡}
United States (RIAA)	Gold	500,000^{‡}
^{‡} Sales+streaming figures based on certification alone.

== Ozzy Osbourne: No Escape From Now documentary ==
Ozzy Osbourne: No Escape From Now, a 2025 film that will document the final six years of Osbourne's life including the recording of Ordinary Man, will stream on Paramount+ on 7 October 2025.
