= Never Too Late (Elton John and Brandi Carlile song) =

Single by Elton John and Brandi Carlile

from the album Elton John: Never Too Late: Soundtrack to the Disney+ Documentary
- Released: November 15, 2024
- Length: 3:26
- Label: EMI; Mercury
- Songwriters: Elton John; Bernie Taupin; Brandi Carlile; Andrew Watt
- Producer: Andrew Watt

Elton John singles chronology
"Hold Me Closer" (2022)	"Never Too Late" (2024)	"Who Believes in Angels?" (2025)

Brandi Carlile singles chronology
"You're Gonna Go Far" (2024)	"Never Too Late" (2024)	"Who Believes in Angels?" (2025)

music video
- "Never Too Late" on YouTube

"Never Too Late" is a song by British singer-songwriter Elton John and American singer-songwriter Brandi Carlile. It was released on November 15, 2024, through EMI and Mercury Records as the lead single from John's 2024 soundtrack to his documentary film, Elton John: Never Too Late. At the 97th Academy Awards the song was nominated for Best Original Song, becoming John's fifth and Carlile's first nomination in the category.

== Background and composition ==
It was wild setting a lyric down in front of Elton John for the first time that I had written and watch him write it. It was absolutely surreal. The thing about Bernie that so influenced my ability to do this, and why I think in the end it became a collaboration, is because Elton doesn’t like saying nice things about himself. [...] It’s soulfully the right thing, based on this story, based on this film, based on the man and the men. Elton is a wildly individual and spectacular comet of a person, but he’s a sum of his parts, (which are) musically Elton John and Bernie Taupin

— Brandi Carlile to Variety in 2024

The film's production was announced in 2022 by The Walt Disney Company, originally with the working title Goodbye Yellow Brick Road: The Final Elton John Performances and the Years That Made His Legend.

During the documentary production, Brandi Carlile and her wife Catherine Shepherd went to Elton John's house in southern France, where they saw an early cut of the documentary with the director David Furnish. Inspired by the movie, Carlile wrote the first lyrics of the song and presented it to John, who submitted it to Andrew Watt and longtime collaborator Bernie Taupin.

After the song's production and rewriting, John decided to change the documentary's name to Elton John: Never Too Late, inspired by the song title.

== Music video ==
The music video for the song was released through John's YouTube channel on November 15, 2024. It features unreleased images and footage initially sourced for the documentary.

== Commercial performance ==
In the United Kingdom, "Never Too Late" debuted on the Official Singles Downloads at No. 3, becoming John's thirteenth top 40 hit on the list. The song also debuted on the Official Singles Sales chart, which is similar to the download-only roster, though it didn't climb quite as high. “Never Too Late” launched at No. 47.

== Accolades ==
Awards and nominations received by "Lift Me Up"
Year	Organization	Category	Result	Ref.
2024	Hollywood Music in Media Awards	Best Original Song in a Documentary	Won	
2025	Academy Awards	Best Original Song	Nominated	
2025	Satellite Awards	Best Original Song	Nominated	
2025	Society of Composers & Lyricists Awards	Outstanding Original Song for a Dramatic or Documentary Visual Media Production	Nominated	
2025	World Soundtrack Awards	Best Original Song	Nominated	
2026	Grammy Awards	Best Song Written for Visual Media	Nominated	

== Charts ==
Chart performance for "Never Too Late"
Chart (2024)	Peak position
UK Singles Sales (OCC)	47

== Release history ==
"Never Too Late" release history
Region	Date	Format	Label	Ref.
Italy	November 15, 2024	Radio airplay	EMI	
