= Elton John: Never Too Late =

2024 documentary film by R. J. Cutler and David Furnish

- Theatrical release poster
- Directed by: R. J. Cutler; David Furnish
- Produced by: R. J. Cutler; David Furnish; Trevor Smith
- Starring: Elton John
- Cinematography: Jenna Rosher
- Edited by: Greg Finton; Poppy Das
- Production companies: Disney Original Documentary; Rocket Entertainment; This Machine
- Distributed by: Walt Disney Studios Motion Pictures
- Release dates: September 6, 2024 (TIFF); November 15, 2024 (United States/United Kingdom); December 13, 2024 (Disney+)
- Running time: 102 minutes
- Countries: United States; United Kingdom
- Language: English
- Box office: $1,350,000

Elton John: Never Too Late is a 2024 documentary film directed by R. J. Cutler and David Furnish. A co-production of Disney Original Documentary and Rocket Entertainment, the film profiles Elton John on his Farewell Yellow Brick Road concert tour, also integrating historic performance footage, excerpts from his private journals, and personal footage of his family life behind the scenes.

The film had its world premiere at the Toronto International Film Festival on September 6, 2024, and had a limited theatrical release by Walt Disney Studios Motion Pictures in the United States and United Kingdom on November 15, 2024, before streaming on Disney+ on December 13, 2024. At the 97th Academy Awards, the original song "Never Too Late", written and performed by John himself and Brandi Carlile, was nominated for Best Original Song, becoming John's fifth and Carlile's first nomination in the category.

== Production and development ==
The film's production was announced in 2022, originally with the working title Goodbye Yellow Brick Road: The Final Elton John Performances and the Years That Made His Legend. Disney acquired the rights for the film for reportedly $30 million. The title change came after Brandi Carlile composed the film's original song "Never Too Late", inspired after seeing a draft of the documentary at Elton John's home in southern France along with the director David Furnish.

== Release ==
The film premiered on September 6, 2024, at the Toronto International Film Festival, and had a limited theatrical release in the United States and United Kingdom on November 15, 2024, before streaming on Disney+ on December 13, 2024.

== Reception ==
On the review aggregator website Rotten Tomatoes, 77% of 43 critics' reviews are positive. The website's consensus reads: "Celebrating Elton John's life while glossing over crucial passages of his career, Never Too Late gets the spirits high without ever going truly deep." Metacritic, which uses a weighted average, assigned the film a score of 61 out of 100, based on 12 critics, indicating "generally favorable" reviews.

=== Accolades ===
Award	Date of ceremony	Category	Recipient(s)	Result	Ref.
Academy Awards	March 2, 2025	Best Original Song	"Never Too Late" (Elton John, Brandi Carlile, Bernie Taupin and Andrew Watt)	Nominated	
Cinema Audio Society Awards	February 22, 2025	Outstanding Achievement in Sound Mixing for a Motion Picture – Documentary	Jae Kim, Elmo Ponsdomenech and Teddy Salas	Nominated	
Golden Reel Awards	February 23, 2025	Outstanding Achievement in Music Editing – Documentary	Michael Brake	Nominated	
Golden Reel Awards	February 23, 2025	Outstanding Achievement in Sound Editing – Feature Documentary	Rob Getty, Richard Yawn and Mike Pipgras	Nominated	
Grammy Awards	February 1, 2026	Best Song Written for Visual Media	"Never Too Late" (Elton John, Brandi Carlile, Bernie Taupin and Andrew Watt)	Nominated	
Hollywood Music in Media Awards	November 20, 2024	Best Music Documentary – Special Program	R.J. Cutler, David Furnish, Trevor Smith	Nominated	
Hollywood Music in Media Awards	November 20, 2024	Best Original Song in a Documentary	"Never Too Late" (Elton John, Brandi Carlile, Bernie Taupin and Andrew Watt)	Won	
iHeartRadio Music Awards	March 17, 2025	Favorite On Screen	Elton John: Never Too Late	Nominated	
Satellite Awards	January 26, 2025	Best Original Song	"Never Too Late" (Elton John and Brandi Carlile)	Nominated	
Society of Composers & Lyricists	February 12, 2025	Outstanding Original Song for a Dramatic or Documentary Visual Media Production	"Never Too Late" (Elton John, Brandi Carlile, Bernie Taupin and Andrew Watt)	Nominated	
