= Andrew Watt =

American record producer and songwriter (born 1990)

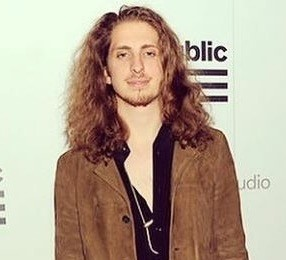
- Watt in 2017

Background information
- Also known as: Watt
- Born: Andrew Wotman; October 20, 1990 (age 36); New York City, U.S.
- Origin: Great Neck, New York, U.S.
- Genre: Rock
- Occupations: Record producer; singer; songwriter
- Instruments: Guitar; keyboards; drums; vocals; bass guitar
- Years active: 2007–present
- Labels: John Varvatos; Republic
- Website: thisiswatt.com

Andrew Wotman (born October 20, 1990), known professionally as Andrew Watt or mononymously as Watt, is an American record producer, songwriter and musician from New York.

Watt is a five-time Grammy Award winner, including the 2021 Grammy Award for Producer of the Year. In 2025, he was nominated for the Academy Award for Best Original Song for co-writing "Never Too Late" from the Elton John documentary of the same name.

Watt first became known in the mid-2010s as a pop songwriter and producer for artists such as Justin Bieber, Lady Gaga, Post Malone and Miley Cyrus. In the 2020s, he started producing albums by perennial rock and pop acts such as Ozzy Osbourne, Iggy Pop, the Rolling Stones, Pearl Jam, Madonna and Paul McCartney. The Times praised him as "the whizzkid who makes rock legends great again."

Watt is also the guitarist of the Earthlings, the backing band for Eddie Vedder's solo performances.

== Early life ==
Watt grew up in Great Neck, New York. He attended John L. Miller Great Neck North High School and graduated in 2008. His favorite band as a teenager was Pearl Jam, which remains his favorite band to this day. Growing up, Watt did not know other kids who cared about rock bands, so he taught himself bass, guitar and drums by listening to Pearl Jam songs. On school nights, he would take the Long Island Rail Road to Manhattan to play at The Cutting Room. Watt said, "One of the greatest aspects of growing up in Great Neck, Long Island, was that it was literally 30 minutes from Manhattan."

Watt was accepted into New York University's Clive Davis Institute of Recorded Music. When he dropped out, his parents severed financial ties with him. To support himself, he played in a local band named Pink Cashmere.

== Solo career ==
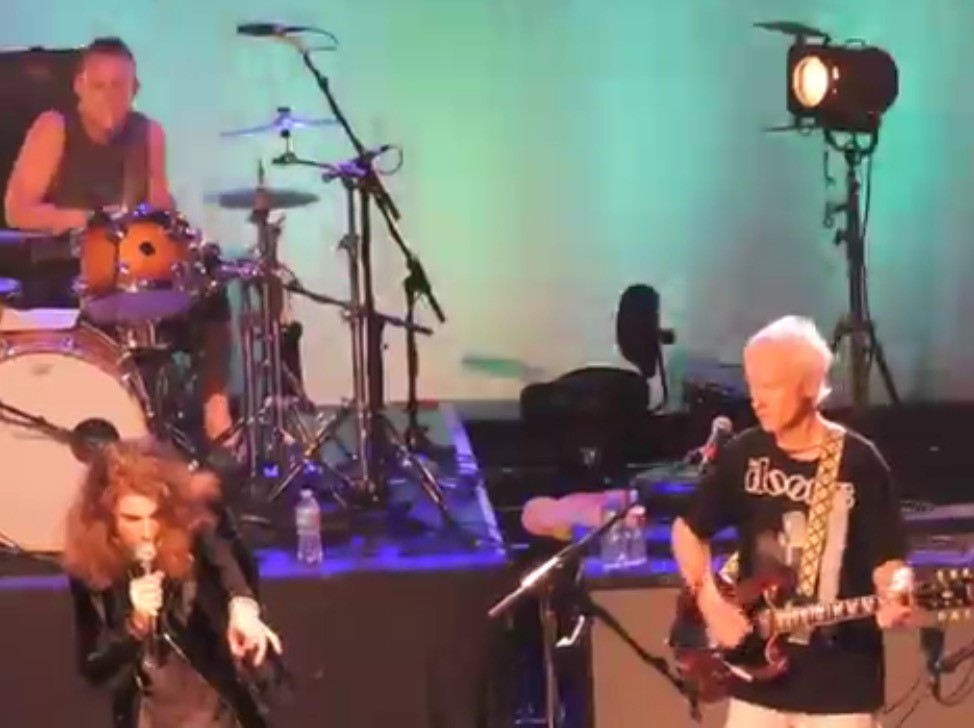
Watt singing the Doors songs at a tribute to Ray Manzarek

In 2013, Watt was the first guitarist for the band California Breed, led by former Deep Purple bassist Glenn Hughes alongside drummer Jason Bonham. Watt later described his time in the band as "a total disaster." His big break came when he toured with the Australian singer Cody Simpson. Simpson was opening for Justin Bieber on the Believe Tour. Watt met Bieber during soundcheck, and the two became friends.

In 2015, Watt released his first EP, Ghost In My Head while signed to Republic Records. The title track peaked at No. 30 on Billboard's Mainstream Rock chart. Red Hot Chili Peppers' Chad Smith and Queens of the Stone Age's Joey Castillo played drums on the EP.

Watt opened for Jane's Addiction in October 2015 and the Cult in February 2016. In February 2016, Rolling Stone praised Watt for his vocal performance in a rendition of "L.A. Woman" performed live with Robby Krieger as part of a tribute to the Doors' Ray Manzarek.

== Production and songwriting career ==
Watt then rose to further fame as a music producer and songwriter. In 2016, Watt had his first songwriting hit with "Let Me Love You", by DJ Snake featuring Justin Bieber. "Let Me Love You" was an unreleased demo that Watt wrote but never released. He began working more closely with Post Malone, who he had met in 2014 when Malone showed up to Watt's show. Watt and co-producer Brian Lee had another hit in 2017 with "It Ain't Me", by Kygo and Selena Gomez.

In November 2017, two Watt songs were in the top 2 of the UK singles chart with Camila Cabello's "Havana" at number 1 and Rita Ora's "Anywhere" at number 2. "Havana" was Watt's first number-one song as a songwriter in both the US and the UK. Watt had his first pop hit as a credited artist with "Let Me Go", which was billed as Hailee Steinfeld and Alesso featuring Florida Georgia Line and Watt. Watt performed background vocals, bass, guitar and percussion on "Let Me Go".

Watt had his first number-one hit in the US as a producer with 2019's "Señorita" by Shawn Mendes and Camila Cabello, which topped the Billboard Hot 100 for one week and the UK singles chart for five weeks.

In late 2019, Watt produced Ozzy Osbourne's album Ordinary Man, which was released in February 2020. Watt met Osbourne through Post Malone, when Watt produced and recorded their collaboration "Take What You Want" in his home studio. This marked a turning point in Watt's career, as it was the first time that he produced an album for an established legacy rock act.

Watt won the Grammy Award for Producer of the Year in March 2021. Watt produced Morrissey's album Bonfire of Teenagers in 2020 and 2021, which was supposed to come out in 2023 but ultimately went unreleased because of a label dispute. In May 2021, he sold his catalog to Hipgnosis Songs Fund in a multi-million dollar deal. Watt also played on the tribute album The Metallica Blacklist, released in September, by backing on Miley Cyrus's cover of "Nothing Else Matters".

Consequence named Watt the "Producer of the Year" in 2022, noting that he became "the go-to collaborator for rock legends." That year, he produced Eddie Vedder's solo album Earthling, Ozzy Osbourne's album Patient Number 9 and Iggy Pop's album Every Loser, which released in January 2023. He also contributed to "Hold Me Closer" by Elton John and Britney Spears, which was a global top-10 hit. While working with Osbourne, Watt attempted to record a final Black Sabbath album with the original lineup, but guitarist Tony Iommi declined the idea. Watt became the guitarist of the Earthlings, Vedder's touring band for his solo shows. The Earthlings also feature Chad Smith on drums, Chris Chaney on bass, and Josh Klinghoffer on guitar.

In 2023, Watt produced and co-wrote three songs on the Rolling Stones' 26th album Hackney Diamonds. It was the Stones' first album of original material in 18 years. In 2024, Watt produced Pearl Jam's twelfth album Dark Matter. He joined Pearl Jam on stage during the band's September 4, 2024 concert at New York City's Madison Square Garden to perform several songs.

In July 2025, Watt made his acting debut when he played a small part as a golf course receptionist in the Adam Sandler film Happy Gilmore 2. In December 2025, Watt, Slash, Duff McKagan, Chad Smith and Adam Wakeman performed under the band name The Dirty Bats for a private event at the Capitol Theatre. They were joined onstage by Bruno Mars, Brandi Carlile, Anthony Kiedis, Yungblud and Eddie Vedder.

In March 2026, Watt collaborated with Michael Stipe for the theme song to the HBO series Rooster, titled "I Played the Fool". Together, they performed the piece on Jimmy Kimmel Live! on June 2, 2026.

In May 2026, Watt produced Paul McCartney's 20th solo album The Boys of Dungeon Lane, which drew critical acclaim and reached number 1 in the UK. Watt worked with the Rolling Stones again to produce Foreign Tongues, which was released in July 2026 and also reached number 1 in the UK.

== Reception ==
As a producer, Watt has been praised for his fearless personality. Producer Cirkut said, "He’s not afraid of being the bad guy", recalling sessions when he challenged Lady Gaga and Jung Kook during the recording process. After his first meeting with Watt, Paul McCartney noted, "I like him, but he's a bit pushy." Watt himself has said, "I've had to say to Mick Jagger a couple of times, 'I think you could write better words than that.'"

== Personal life ==
Watt is engaged to the musician Charlotte Lawrence.

== Discography ==
=== Albums produced ===
- Ozzy Osbourne – Ordinary Man (2020)
- Miley Cyrus – Plastic Hearts (2020)
- Eddie Vedder – Earthling (2022)
- Ozzy Osbourne – Patient Number 9 (2022)
- Iggy Pop – Every Loser (2023)
- Morrissey – Bonfire of Teenagers (originally 2023, unreleased)
- Post Malone – Austin (2023)
- The Rolling Stones – Hackney Diamonds (2023)
- Pearl Jam – Dark Matter (2024)
- Lady Gaga – Mayhem (2025)
- Elton John & Brandi Carlile – Who Believes in Angels? (2025)
- Brandi Carlile – Returning to Myself (2025)
- Paul McCartney – The Boys of Dungeon Lane (2026)
- The Rolling Stones – Foreign Tongues (2026)

=== Performer history ===
Year	Title	Peak chart positions				Certifications	Album
Year	Title	U.S. Hot 100	U.S. Pop	U.S. Rock	U.S. Alt	Certifications	Album
2016	"Ghost in My Head"	—	—	30	—		Ghost in My Head EP
2017	"Let Me Go" (Hailee Steinfeld and Alesso featuring Florida Georgia Line and Watt)	40	14	—	—	RIAA: Platinum; ARIA: 5× Platinum; BPI: Platinum; MC: 4× Platinum	Non-album singles
2017	"Burning Man" (featuring Post Malone)	—	—	—	40		Non-album singles

== Awards and nominations ==
Award ceremony	Year	Nominee/Work	Category	Result	Ref.
Academy Awards	2025	"Never Too Late"	Best Original Song	Nominated	
Grammy Awards	2021	Andrew Watt	Producer of the Year, Non-Classical	Won	
Grammy Awards	2022	Justice	Album of the Year	Nominated	
Grammy Awards	2022	"Peaches"	Record of the Year	Nominated	
Grammy Awards	2022	"Peaches"	Song of the Year	Nominated	
Grammy Awards	2023	Patient Number 9	Best Rock Album	Won	
Grammy Awards	2023	"Patient Number 9"	Best Rock Song	Nominated	
Grammy Awards	2024	"Angry"	Best Rock Song	Nominated	
Grammy Awards	2025	"Die with a Smile"	Song of the Year	Nominated	
Grammy Awards	2025	Hackney Diamonds	Best Rock Album	Won	
Grammy Awards	2025	"Dark Matter"	Best Rock Song	Nominated	
Grammy Awards	2026	Mayhem	Album of the Year	Nominated	
Grammy Awards	2026	Mayhem	Best Pop Vocal Album	Won	
Grammy Awards	2026	"Abracadabra"	Record of the Year	Nominated	
Grammy Awards	2026	"Abracadabra"	Song of the Year	Nominated	
Grammy Awards	2026	"Abracadabra"	Best Dance Pop Recording	Won	
Grammy Awards	2026	"Never Too Late"	Best Song Written for Visual Media	Nominated	
Grammy Awards	2027	"Danceteria"	Best Dance Pop Recording	Pending	
Grammy Awards	2027	"Runway"	Best Song Written for Visual Media	Pending	
iHeartRadio Music Awards	2018	Andrew Watt	Producer of the Year	Won	
iHeartRadio Music Awards	2019	Andrew Watt	Songwriter of the Year	Nominated	
iHeartRadio Music Awards	2020	Andrew Watt	Producer of the Year	Nominated	
iHeartRadio Music Awards	2021	Andrew Watt	Producer of the Year	Nominated	
iHeartRadio Music Awards	2026	Andrew Watt	Producer of the Year	Won	
Hollywood Music in Media Awards	2018	"For You"	Best Original Song in a Feature Film	Nominated	
Hollywood Music in Media Awards	2024	"Never Too Late"	Best Original Song in a Documentary	Won	
Hollywood Music in Media Awards	2025	"The Dead Dance"	Hollywood Music in Media Award for Best Original Song in a TV Show/Limited Series	Won	
Primetime Emmy Awards	2026	"The Dead Dance"	Outstanding Original Music and Lyrics	Nominated	
Society of Composers & Lyricists Awards	2025	"Never Too Late"	Outstanding Original Song for a Dramatic or Documentary Visual Media Production	Nominated	
