= Brandi Carlile discography =

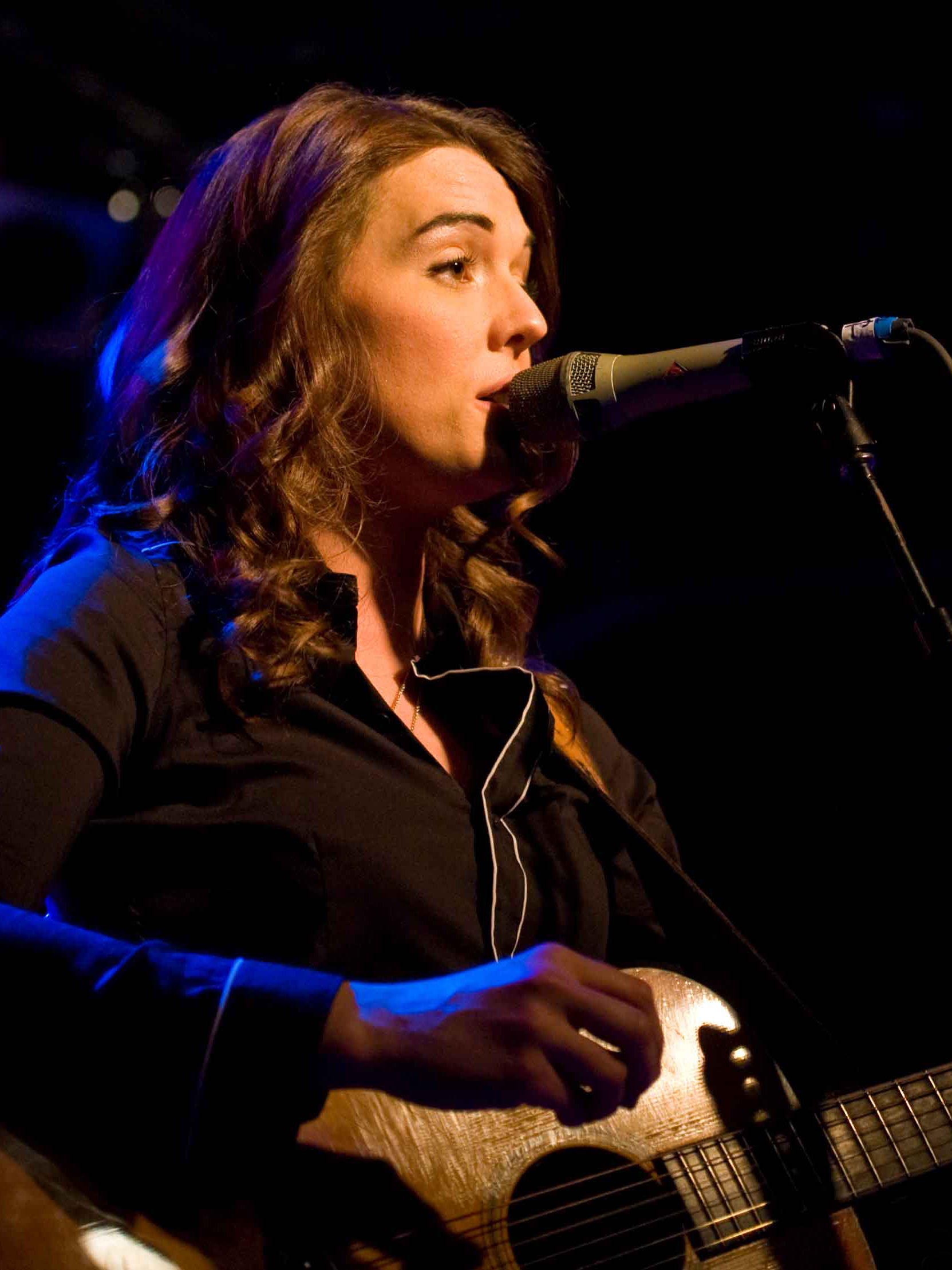
- Carlile performing in Seattle, Washington on November 20, 2010.
- Studio albums: 9
- EPs: 15
- Live albums: 1
- Compilation albums: 1
- Singles: 31
- Demo albums: 3

The discography of Brandi Carlile, an American singer-songwriter and producer, consists of nine studio albums, one live album, one compilation album, three demo albums, 15 extended plays, and 31 singles.

== Albums ==
=== Studio albums ===
Title	Album details	Chart positions										Certifications
Title	Album details	US	AUS	AUT	CAN	NOR	POR	SCO	SWE	SWI	UK	Certifications
Brandi Carlile	Released: July 12, 2005; Label: RED Ink / Columbia; Formats: LP, CD, digital download, streaming	80	—	—	—	—	—	—	—	—	—	
The Story	Released: April 3, 2007; Label: Columbia; Formats: LP, CD, digital download, streaming	41	55	—	—	7	4	71	33	18	58	RIAA: Gold
Give Up the Ghost	Released: October 2, 2009; Label: Columbia; Formats: LP, CD, digital download, streaming	26	—	—	—	—	—	—	—	33	—	
Bear Creek	Released: June 1, 2012; Label: Columbia; Formats: LP, CD, digital download, streaming	10	—	—	—	—	—	—	—	39	—	
The Firewatcher's Daughter	Released: March 3, 2015; Label: ATO; Formats: LP, CD, digital download, streaming	9	—	—	17	—	—	77	—	50	— (Note: The Firewatcher's Daughter did not enter the UK Albums Chart but did peak at number 91 on the UK Album Sales Chart.)	
By the Way, I Forgive You	Released: February 16, 2018; Label: Low Country Sound / Elektra; Formats: LP, CD, digital download, streaming	5	—	—	27	—	—	98	—	13	— (Note: By the Way, I Forgive You did not enter the UK Albums Chart but did peak at number 96 on the UK Album Sales Chart.)	
In These Silent Days	Released: October 1, 2021; Label: Low Country Sound / Elektra; Formats: LP, CD, digital download, streaming	11	— (Note: In These Silent Days did not enter the Australian Albums Chart but did peak at number four on the Australian Hitseeker Albums chart.)	64	43	—	—	21	—	12	— (Note: In These Silent Days did not enter the UK Albums Chart but did peak at number 24 on the UK Album Downloads Chart.)	
Who Believes in Angels? (with Elton John)	Released: April 4, 2025; Label: Interscope; Formats: LP, CD, digital download, streaming	9	26	2	52	75	—	1	—	1	1	
Returning to Myself	Released: October 24, 2025; Label: Interscope, Lost Highway; Formats: LP, CD, digital download, streaming	7	84	51	—	—	—	5	—	17	30	
"—" denotes releases that did not chart

=== Reissue albums ===
Title	Album details
In the Canyon Haze	Released: September 28, 2022; Label: Low Country Sound, Elektra; Formats: LP, digital download, streaming

=== Live albums ===
Title	Album details	Chart positions		
Title	Album details	US	US Folk	US Rock
Live at Benaroya Hall with the Seattle Symphony	Released: May 3, 2011; Label: Columbia; Formats: LP, CD, digital download, streaming	63	5	14

=== Compilation albums ===
Title	Album details	Chart positions
Title	Album details	US
Cover Stories	Released: May 5, 2017; Label: Legacy; Formats: LP, CD, digital download, streaming	30

=== Demo albums ===
Title	Album details
Room for Me	Released: 2000; Label: Self-released; Formats: CD
Open Doors	Released: 2002; Label: Self-released; Formats: CD
We're Growing Up	Released: 2003; Label: Self-released; Formats: CD

== Extended plays ==
Title	Album details	Chart positions		
Title	Album details	US	US Folk	US Rock
Acoustic	Released: 2004; Label: Self-released; Formats: CD	—	—	—
Sony Connect Exclusive	Released: November 29, 2005; Label: Sony; Formats: Digital download, streaming	—	—	—
Live from Neumo's	Released: January 10, 2006; Label: Columbia; Formats: CD, digital download, streaming	—	—	—
Rhapsody Originals	Released: May 1, 2007; Label: Columbia; Formats: Digital download, streaming	—	—	—
Napster Live	Released: May 29, 2007; Label: Columbia; Formats: Digital download, streaming	—	—	—
Alive in the World: A Concert For The Kids (with Ben Taylor)	Released: 2007; Label: Self-released; Formats: CD	—	—	—
Live at Connect Set	Released: June 12, 2007; Label: Sony; Formats: Digital download, streaming	—	—	—
Live at Easy Street Records	Released: October 7, 2007; Label: Sony; Formats: CD, digital download, streaming	—	—	—
Live from Boston	Released: September 16, 2008; Label: Sony BMG; Formats: Digital download, streaming	—	—	—
The Zune EP	Released: 2008; Label: Columbia; Formats: Digital download	—	—	—
XOBC	Released: February 8, 2010; Label: Sony; Formats: Digital download, streaming	80	1	18
Live at Bear Creek	Released: May 22, 2012; Label: Self-released; Formats: Digital download	—	—	—
Live at KCRW: Morning Becomes Electric	Released: April 16, 2016; Label: ATO; Formats: Vinyl	—	—	—
Spotify Singles	Released: June 20, 2018; Label: Low Country, Elektra; Formats: Streaming	—	—	—
A Rooster Says	Released: September 26, 2020; Label: Low Country, Elektra; Formats: 7-inch record, digital download, streaming	—	—	—

== Singles ==
=== As lead artist ===
List of singles, with selected chart positions and certifications, showing year released and album name
Title	Year	Peak chart positions										Album
Title	Year	US	US Pop	US Rock	AUS	AUT	CAN	IRE	NOR	SWI	UK Sales	Album
"Hallelujah" (Live at KCRW.com)	2005	—	—	—	—	—	—	—	—	—	—	Non-album single
"Fall Apart Again"	2005	—	—	—	—	—	—	—	—	—	—	Brandi Carlile
"What Can I Say"	2006	—	—	— (Note: "What Can I Say" did not enter the US Hot Rock & Alternative Songs chart, but peaked at number 16 on the Triple A Airplay chart.)	—	—	—	—	—	—	—	Brandi Carlile
"The Story"	2007	75	68	— (Note: "The Story" did not enter the US Hot Rock & Alternative Songs chart, but peaked at number one on the Rock Digital Song Sales chart.)	44	38	49	93	3	16	30	The Story
"Turpentine"	2007	—	—	— (Note: "Turpentine" did not enter the US Hot Rock & Alternative Songs chart, but peaked at number 14 on the Triple A Airplay chart.)	—	—	—	—	—	—	—	The Story
"Late Morning Lullaby" (Live in Portland)	2007	—	—	—	—	—	—	—	—	—	—	Live at Connect Set
"Creep" (Live from Boston)	2008	—	—	—	—	—	—	—	—	—	—	Live from Boston
"Downpour"	2009	—	—	—	—	—	—	—	—	—	—	Non-album single
"Dreams"	2009	—	—	— (Note: "Dreams" did not enter the US Hot Rock & Alternative Songs chart, but peaked at number eight on the Triple A Airplay chart.)	—	—	—	—	—	—	—	Give Up the Ghost
"That Year"	2010	—	—	—	—	—	—	—	—	—	—	Give Up the Ghost
"Dying Day"	2010	—	—	—	—	—	—	—	—	—	—	Give Up the Ghost
"Can't Help Falling in Love"	2011	—	—	—	—	—	—	—	—	—	—	Non-album single
"That Wasn't Me"	2012	—	—	41	—	—	—	—	—	—	—	Bear Creek
"Keep Your Heart Young"	2012	—	—	—	—	—	—	—	—	—	—	Bear Creek
"The Eye"	2014	—	—	— (Note: "The Eye" did not enter the US Hot Rock & Alternative Songs chart, but peaked at number 27 on the Triple A Airplay chart.)	—	—	—	—	—	—	—	The Firewatcher's Daughter
"Wherever Is Your Heart"	2014	—	—	— (Note: "Wherever Is Your Heart" did not enter the US Hot Rock & Alternative Songs chart, but peaked at number eight on the Triple A Airplay chart.)	—	—	—	—	—	—	—	The Firewatcher's Daughter
"Free Ride" (music from the film)	2014	—	—	—	—	—	—	—	—	—	—	Non-album single
"The Joke"	2017	— (Note: "The Joke" did not enter the Billboard Hot 100, but peaked at number four on the Bubbling Under Hot 100 chart.)	—	4	—	—	— (Note: "The Joke" did not enter the Canadian Hot 100, but peaked at number 10 on the Canadian chart.)	—	—	—	52	By the Way, I Forgive You
"Every Time I Hear That Song"	2018	—	—	49	—	—	—	—	—	—	—	By the Way, I Forgive You
"Party of One" (featuring Sam Smith)	2018	—	— (Note: "Party of One" did not enter the Billboard Pop 100, but peaked at number 29 on the Adult Contemporary chart.)	35	—	—	—	—	—	—	—	By the Way, I Forgive You
"Carried Me with You"	2020	—	—	33	—	—	—	—	—	—	—	Onward (Original Motion Picture Soundtrack)
"Black Hole Sun"	2020	—	—	47	—	—	—	—	—	—	— (Note: "Black Hole Sun" did not enter the UK Singles Chart, but peaked at number 10 on the UK Physical Sales Chart.)	A Rooster Says
"A Beautiful Noise" (with Alicia Keys)	2020	— (Note: "A Beautiful Noise" did not enter the Billboard Hot 100, but peaked at number eight on the Digital Song Sales chart.)	—	—	—	—	— (Note: "A Beautiful Noise" did not enter the Canadian Hot 100, but peaked at number 50 on the Canadian chart.)	—	—	—	—	Alicia (Digital Edition)
"Take Me Home, Country Roads" from Clarice	2021	—	—	—	—	—	—	—	—	—	—	Non-album single
"I Put a Spell On You" (with Renee Elise Goldsberry)	2021	—	—	—	—	—	—	—	—	—	—	The Social Dilemma (Music from the Netflix Original Documentary)
"Speak Your Mind" from We the People	2021	—	—	—	—	—	—	—	—	—	—	Non-album single
"Right on Time"	2021	— (Note: "Right on Time" did not enter the Billboard Hot 100, but peaked at number 26 on the Digital Song Sales chart.)	—	43	—	—	— (Note: "Right on Time" did not enter the Canadian Hot 100, but peaked at number 32 on the Canadian chart.)	—	—	—	—	In These Silent Days
"Broken Horses"	2022	—	—	— (Note: "Broken Horses" did not enter the US Hot Rock & Alternative Songs chart, but peaked at number ten on the Rock Digital Song Sales chart.)	—	—	—	—	—	—	—	In These Silent Days
"You and Me on the Rock" (featuring Lucius)	2022	—	—	— (Note: "You and Me On the Rock" did not enter the US Hot Rock & Alternative Songs chart, but peaked at number 19 on the Triple A Airplay chart.)	—	—	—	—	—	—	—	In These Silent Days
"You and Me On the Rock" (In the Canyon Haze version)	2022	—	—	—	—	—	—	—	—	—	—	In the Canyon Haze
"Home"	2023	—	—	—	—	—	—	—	—	—	—	Ted Lasso: Season 3
"Never Too Late" (with Elton John)	2024	—	—	—	—	—	—	—	—	—	47	Who Believes in Angels?
"Who Believes in Angels?" (with Elton John)	2025	—	—	—	—	—	—	—	—	—	23	Who Believes in Angels?
"Swing for the Fences" (with Elton John)	2025	—	—	—	—	—	—	—	—	—	85	Who Believes in Angels?
"Returning to Myself"	2025	—	—	— (Note: "Returning to Myself" did not enter the US Hot Rock & Alternative Songs chart, but peaked at number 12 on the Triple A Airplay chart.)	—	—	—	—	—	—	—	Returning to Myself
"A War with Time"	2025	—	—	—	—	—	—	—	—	—	—	Returning to Myself
"Church & State"	2025	—	—	—	—	—	—	—	—	—	—	Returning to Myself
"Human"	2025	—	—	— (Note: "Human" did not enter the US Hot Rock & Alternative Songs chart, but peaked at number 6 on the Triple A Airplay chart.)	—	—	—	—	—	—	—	Returning to Myself
"America the Beautiful" (Live)	2026	—	—	—	—	—	—	—	—	—	—	Super Bowl LX Live from Santa Clara, CA
"Life on the Run"	2026	—	—	—	—	—	—	—	—	—	—	
"—" denotes a recording that did not chart or was not released in that territory.

=== As featured artist ===
List of singles, with selected chart positions and certifications, showing year released and album name
Title	Year	Peak chart positions							Album
Title	Year	US AAA	US Adult	US Alt	US Rock	CAN	IRE	NZ Hot	Album
"Pirate On The Run" (Pat Monahan featuring Brandi Carlile)	2007	—	—	—	—	—	—	—	Last of Seven
"My Repair" (The Noises 10 featuring Brandi Carlile)	2012	—	—	—	—	—	—	—	Non-album single
"Good With God" (Old 97's featuring Brandi Carlile)	2017	11	—	—	—	—	—	—	Graveyard Whistling
"Come Tomorrow" (Dave Matthews Band featuring Brandi Carlile)	2019	24	34	—	—	—	—	—	Come Tomorrow
"The Astronaut" (Candi Carpenter featuring Brandi Carlile)	2019	—	—	—	—	—	—	—	Non-album single
"Angel Band" (Leslie Jordan featuring Brandi Carlile)	2021	—	—	—	—	—	—	—	Company's Comin'
"Dirt Around the Tree" (Candi Carpenter featuring Brandi Carlile)	2021	—	—	—	—	—	—	—	TBA
"We Don't Know We're Living" (Lucie Silvas featuring Brandi Carlile and Joy Oladokun)	2021	—	—	—	—	—	—	—	Non-album single
"Dance Around It" (Lucius featuring Brandi Carlile and Sheryl Crow)	2022	31	—	—	—	—	—	—	Second Nature
"Dear Insecurity" (Brandy Clark featuring Brandi Carlile)	2023	–	–	—	—	—	—	—	Brandy Clark
"You're Gonna Go Far" (Noah Kahan featuring Brandi Carlile)	2024	–	–	4	7	59	23	24	Stick Season (Forever)
"—" denotes a recording that did not chart or was not released in that territory.

== Other charted songs ==
Title	Year	Peak chart positions										Album
Title	Year	US	US Alt	US Country	US Rock	CAN	IRE	NZ Hot	POR	UK	WW	Album
"Common" (Maren Morris featuring Brandi Carlile)	2019	—	—	47	—	—	—	—	—	—	—	Girl
"I Remember Everything"	2021	—	—	—	— (Note: "I Remember Everything" did not enter the US Hot Rock & Alternative Songs chart, but peaked at number 17 on the Rock Digital Song Sales chart.)	—	—	—	—	—	—	Broken Hearts & Dirty Windows: Songs of John Prine, Vol. 2
"How" (with Marcus Mumford)	2022	—	— (Note: "How" did not enter the US Hot Alternative Songs chart, but peaked at number 14 on the Alternative Digital Song Sales chart.)	—	—	—	—	—	—	—	—	Self-Titled
"Thousand Miles" (Miley Cyrus featuring Brandi Carlile)	2023	68	—	—	—	65	—	6	197	— (Note: "Thousand Miles" did not enter the UK Singles Chart, but peaked at number 75 on the UK Singles Sales Chart.)	92	Endless Summer Vacation
"Closer to Fine" (with Catherine Carlile)	2023	– (Note: "Closer to Fine" did not enter the Billboard Hot 100 but peaked at number 35 on the Digital Song Sales chart.)	—	–	— (Note: "Closer to Fine" did not enter the US Hot Rock & Alternative Songs chart, but peaked at number seven on the Rock Digital Song Sales chart.)	—	—	—	—	—	—	Barbie
"Damage Gets Done" (with Hozier)	2023	–	16	—	21	—	67	6	—	86	—	Unreal Unearth
"—" denotes releases that did not chart

== Music videos ==
Year	Video	Ref.
2007	"The Story"	
2007	"Turpentine"	
2009	"Dreams"	
2010	"That Year"	
2010	"Dying Day"	
2012	"That Wasn't Me"	
2012	"Keep Your Heart Young"	
2014	"The Eye"	
2015	"Mainstream Kid"	
2015	"Wherever Is Your Heart"	
2018	"The Joke"	
2018	"Hold Out Your Hand"	
2018	"Party of One" (featuring Sam Smith)	
2018	"Party of One"	
2019	"The Mother"	
2021	"Right on Time"	
2022	"You and Me on the Rock"	

== Collaborations ==
- 2008: "Already Home" (featuring Ha*Ash)
- 2009: "If I Go, I'm Goin" (Gregory Alan Isakov featuring Brandi Carlile)
- 2013: "Making Believe" (featuring Willie Nelson)
- 2016: "The NeverEnding Story" (featuring Shooter Jennings)
- 2016: "Angel from Montgomery" (featuring Buddy Miller)
- 2017: "Cleanup Hitter" (featuring Shovels & Rope)
- 2017: "Good with God" (featuring Old 97's)
- 2018: "Party of One" (featuring Sam Smith)
- 2018: "Travelin' Light" (Dierks Bentley featuring Brandi Carlile)
- 2019: "Common" (Maren Morris featuring Brandi Carlile)
- 2019: "Down to You" (featuring Joni 75)
- 2019: "Beware of Darkness" (Sheryl Crow featuring Eric Clapton, Sting and Brandi Carlile)
- 2019: "Finish What We Started" (Zac Brown Band featuring Brandi Carlile)
- 2020: "Hold On" (Yola featuring backing vocals by Brandi and Natalie Hemby)
- 2021: "Run to Me" (Barry Gibb featuring Brandi Carlile)
- 2021: "Simple Things" (Elton John featuring Brandi Carlile)
- 2021: "It All Fades Away" (Jennifer Nettles featuring Brandi Carlile)
- 2021: "Be My Friend" (Yola featuring Brandi on supporting vocals)
- 2023: "Thousand Miles" (Miley Cyrus featuring Brandi Carlile)
- 2023: "Down in the Willow Garden" (Rufus Wainwright featuring Brandi Carlile)
- 2023: "Breakfast in Birmingham" (Tanya Tucker)
- 2023: "Little Blue" (Jacob Collier)
- 2024: "Damage Gets Done" (Hozier featuring Brandi Carlile)
- 2024: "Never Too Late" (Elton John featuring Brandi Carlile)
- 2025: Who Believes in Angels?” (Elton John & Brandi Carlile)
