= Live at Benaroya Hall with the Seattle Symphony =

2011 live album by Brandi Carlile

Live album by Brandi Carlile
- Released: May 3, 2011
- Recorded: November 19–21, 2010
- Venues: Benaroya Hall, Seattle
- Genre: Pop rock
- Length: 61:08
- Label: Columbia
- Producer: Martin Feveyear

Brandi Carlile chronology
Give Up the Ghost (2009)	Live at Benaroya Hall with the Seattle Symphony (2011)	Bear Creek (2012)

Live at Benaroya Hall with the Seattle Symphony is the fourth album by American singer-songwriter Brandi Carlile, released on May 3, 2011, through Columbia Records. Recorded during two sold-out shows in November 2010 at Benaroya Hall in Seattle, Washington, the album features Washington-native Carlile and her long-time band (including brothers Phil and Tim Hanseroth) performing alongside the Seattle Symphony. Seattle-based producer and audio engineer Martin Feveyear recorded the concerts, which contained orchestral arrangements by Paul Buckmaster and Sean O'Loughlin. Carlile had previously performed with the Seattle Symphony in 2008 at the same venue.

The album contains three songs from Carlile's second studio album, The Story (2007), five from Give Up the Ghost (2009), and three covers, including Elton John's "Sixty Years On", Simon & Garfunkel's "The Sound of Silence", and Leonard Cohen's "Hallelujah" (which also features Alphaville's "Forever Young"). Critical reception of Live at Benaroya Hall was positive overall. In the United States, the album reached peak positions of number sixty-three on the Billboard 200, number five on the Top Folk Albums chart, and number fourteen on the Top Rock Albums chart.

== Background ==
Live at Benaroya Hall with the Seattle Symphony was recorded at two sold-out shows in November 2010 during Carlile's tour in support of her previous studio album, Give Up the Ghost (2009). Carlile, who said that she and the band had always wanted their fourth release to be a live album, had initially hoped to record at a famous venue but decided to return to Benaroya Hall, since she had performed there alongside the symphony in 2008. Prior to the single rehearsal Carlile had with the 30-member-strong Seattle Symphony, string arrangers created charts and sent computer-generated demos to Carlile for approval. Carlile was reportedly "shock[ed]" to hear the orchestra "weaving in and out" of her music. According to Carlile, while the recording process was not complicated, she commented later on rehearsing with the full symphony:

The rehearsal process is really understated. It's funny because it's not really needed. It's not needed for us anyway. Because we know how to play the songs, and the [symphony] charts don't change the songs structurally at all. But the symphony charts are something that you're not used to hearing. And then the symphony doesn't need the rehearsal because they sight-read. They sight-read better than we could even imagine. So when we get there, they already know how to play our songs better than we do... The purpose of the rehearsal is really, honestly to prepare the band for exactly how powerful the concert is going to be. When the symphony jumps in during those moments where all of a sudden you're singing a song you sing every night and then 30 more musicians start playing, it's so powerful that it causes you to take pause, and you can't take pause. And that's what the rehearsal really is for.

== Composition ==
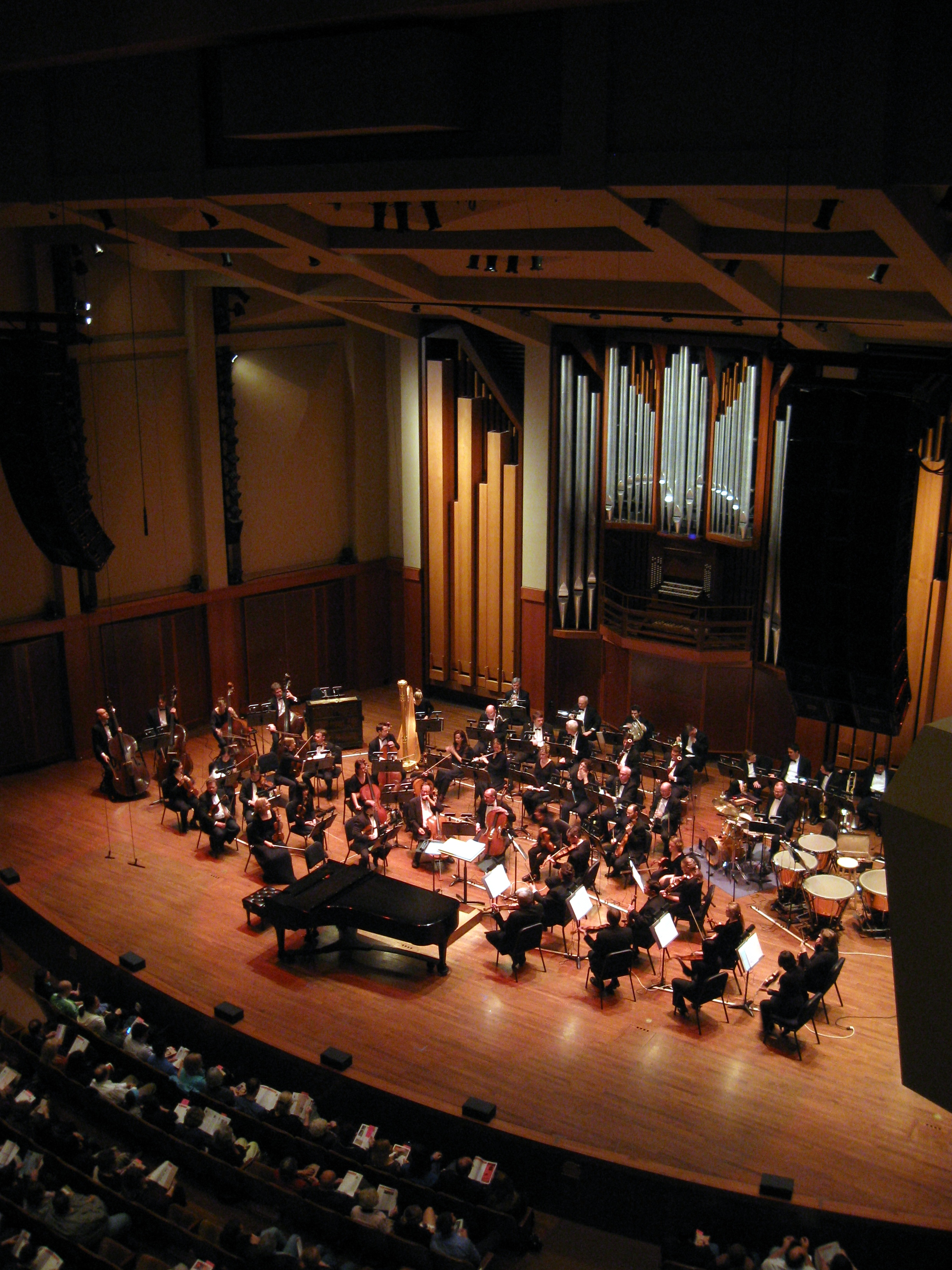
Seattle Symphony at Benaroya Hall in Seattle in 2009

Live at Benaroya Hall features arrangements by British arranger and composer Paul Buckmaster, who worked previously with Carlile on Give Up the Ghost, and Sean O'Loughlin. Seattle-based producer and audio engineer Martin Feveyear, who had mixed Carlile's debut album in addition to other live EPs and demos, recorded, mixed, and mastered the album. Carlile had not spoken to Feveyear prior to the first rehearsal, but was pleased with the result of his work. Carlile's band included long-time members (and brothers) Phil and Tim Hanseroth on guitar and bass, Josh Neumann on cello, and Allison Miller on drums. The Seattle Symphony was led by Assistant Conductor Eric Garcia.

The pop rock album opens with the curtain call, strengthening the impression of a live recording rather than a studio album. Carlile performed "Shadow on the Wall", "Turpentine", and "The Story", which had appeared on Carlile's second studio album The Story (2007). "Looking Out", "Before It Breaks", "I Will", "Dreams", and "Pride and Joy" had all appeared on Give Up the Ghost. Believing in the cultivation of standards, Carlile included six cover versions in the set list, three of which appear on the album. "Sixty Years On", originally written by Elton John and Bernie Taupin, was arranged by Paul Buckmaster. Carlile, a fan of the "dark" string arrangements that appear on John's album Tumbleweed Connection (1970), contacted Buckmaster on the advice of her manager. Carlile first heard the Hanseroth brothers singing Paul Simon's "The Sound of Silence" in 2009 and asked them to perform it during the set. She does not contribute vocals to the version that appears on the album. Carlile's cover of Leonard Cohen's "Hallelujah", also arranged by Buckmaster, is followed by a hidden track: a cover of Alphaville's "Forever Young". Carlile said the following of Cohen's song:

"Hallelujah" is going to be a standard that our grandkids, our great-great grandkids will learn to sing in church. It's one of those really, really special songs. The thing that's going to make it that, besides that it's so great, is that everyone knows about it because hundreds of songwriters have been moved by that song and have covered it. And that's just something really important that we do in every generation.

The number of cover songs, which play a prominent role in Carlile's live act, represented what she typically includes in a concert. Carlile said that she felt as though she were a member of The Beatles when the audience stood and loudly sang the words to "Dreams", and that "Before It Breaks" and "I Will" were emotionally the most difficult to perform. Carlile jokes with the audience between songs, which she felt was well-received, and requests their participation in three-part harmony during "Turpentine". During the concert, the band experienced technical difficulties, and a bra thrown from the audience, intended for the drummer, hit Carlile on stage. Carlile said the "rock 'n' roll symphony album" was "the meeting of two worlds, two different kinds of artists who got together for completely different reasons." She has said that the album is the one she and her band are most proud of, believing it truly represents their live act.

== Critical reception ==
Professional ratings
Review scores
Source	Rating
Allmusic	4/5 stars
Glide	4/5 stars
Oklahoma Gazette	(positive)
Paste	(8.1/10)
The Salt Lake Tribune	A−
The Seattle Times	(positive)
The Source Weekly	(positive)

Overall, critical reception of the album was positive. Nick Vissey of The Seattle Times wrote that "standout" tracks included "Dreams" and "Pride and Joy", which highlighted Carlile's "unique folk-rock style" and "enthralling, emotional and fun" voice. The Hanseroth brothers' cover of Paul Simon's "The Sound of Silence" was deemed "spot-on" by Allmusic's Andrew Leahey and "breathtaking" by Gene Stout of the Seattle Post-Intelligencer. The Source Weekly contributor Mike Bookey complimented the album for capturing Carlile's live act and recommended this album for first-time listeners of her music. Glide magazine's reviewer complimented Carlile's "authentic and raw" vocals and appreciated that recorded flaws were not covered up. Stephen Carradini of the Oklahoma Gazette also noted the errors, but summarized his review by saying, "Things aren't perfect; they're still beautiful." Carradini also complimented the successful transition of Carlile's acoustic-based songs to orchestral arrangements. The Salt Lake Tribune's David Burger gave the album an A – rating, asserting that Live at Benaroya Hall captures the "unbridled spirit" of Carlile's live act more than any of her studio albums. Burger also wrote that Carlile's "well-crafted" songs were "gloriously illustrated" by Buckmaster's and O'Loughlin's arrangements. Gregg Shapiro of the Bay Area Reporter said that listening to the album is a must, even for people who do not often enjoy live albums. Paste magazine included the album on its list of "12 May Albums Worth Checking Out". The magazine's contributor Jeff Leven wrote that though the album was "over-stacked" with cover songs, it was "anthemic" and "captivating", and that Carlile's passion was "overwhelming and contagious." Leahey's review concluded: "This isn't Brandi Carlile's first concert album, but it's certainly the best." Similarly, Visser called the album Carlile's "best work to date".

== Track listing ==
No.	Title	Writer(s)	Length
1.	"Curtain Call"		1:11
2.	"Sixty Years On"	Elton John, Bernie Taupin	4:51
3.	"Looking Out"	Brandi Carlile	4:33
4.	"Before It Breaks"	Carlile, Phil Hanseroth, Tim Hanseroth	4:23
5.	"I Will"	Carlile	4:39
6.	"Shadow on the Wall"	Carlile, T. Hanseroth	3:53
7.	"Dreams"	Carlile, P. Hanseroth, T. Hanseroth	4:10
8.	"Turpentine"	Carlile	6:21
9.	"The Sound of Silence"	Paul Simon	3:26
10.	"The Story"	P. Hanseroth	5:06
11.	"Pride and Joy"	Carlile	7:07
12.	"Hallelujah" (includes hidden track "Forever Young")	Leonard Cohen	11:28

Track listing adapted from Allmusic and album liner notes.

== Personnel ==
- Jennifer Bai – violin
- Mariel Bailey – violin
- Michael Bauer – photography
- Theresa Benshoof – cello
- Geoffrey Bergler – trumpet
- William Brown – assistant
- Paul Buckmaster – orchestral arrangements
- Jonathan Burnstein – double bass
- Brandi Carlile – composer, guitar, electric guitar, piano, vocals
- John Carrington – harp
- Leonard Cohen – composer
- Vince Comer – viola
- Michael Crusoe – timpani
- Andrew Detloff – assistant
- Tony Dilorenzo – trumpet
- Roberta Downey – cello
- Wesley Dyring – viola
- Zartouhi Dombourian Eby – flute
- Justin Emerich – trumpet
- Martin Feveyear – engineer, mastering, mixing, record producer
- Alex Gardner – live sound engineer
- Mara Gearman – viola
- Sande Gillette – violin
- Artur Girsky – violin
- David Gordon – trumpet
- Valerie Muzzolini Gordon – harp
- Vivian Gu – cello
- Phil Hanseroth – acoustic bass, bass, composer, vocals
- Tim Hanseroth – composer, electric guitar, guitar, vocals
- Ben Hausmann – oboe
- Patrick Herb – trombone
- Dylan Hermiston – photography
- Michelle Holme – art direction
- Adam Iascone – French horn
- Elton John – composer
- Josh Neumann – cello, piano
- Joe Kaufman – double bass
- Seth Krimsky – bassoon
- Joe Larosee – assistant
- Mae Lin – violin
- Mary Kate McElvaney – photography
- Emma McGrath – violin
- Allison Miller – drums, snare drums
- Michael Miropolsky – violin
- Sean O'Loughlin – orchestral arrangements
- Jon Pagan – electric guitar, piano
- Mark Robbins – French horn
- Jon Schlukebier – engineer
- Christopher Sereque – clarinet
- Kim Sessions – cover photo
- Mikhail Shmidt – violin
- Paul Simon – composer
- Bernie Taupin – composer
- Brian Valentino – engineer
- John Weller – violin
- Michael Werner – percussion
- Jeannie Wells Yablonsky – violin
- Ko-ichiro Yamamoto – trombone

Personnel adapted from Allmusic and album liner notes.

== Charts ==
In the United States, Live at Benaroya Hall with the Seattle Symphony reached peak positions of number sixty-three on the Billboard 200, number five on the Top Folk Albums chart, and number fourteen on the Top Rock Albums chart.

Chart (2011)	Peak position
US Billboard 200	63
US Americana/Folk Albums (Billboard)	5
US Top Rock Albums (Billboard)	14
