= Sara Ramírez (disambiguation) =

Sara Ramirez (born 1975) is a Mexican-American singer, songwriter, and actor.

Sara Ramírez may also refer to:

- Sara Ramirez (EP), their 2011 debut extended play
- Sara Estela Ramírez (1881–1910), Mexican teacher, writer and activist
- Sara Ramírez (table tennis) (born 1987), Spanish table tennis player
