= XOBC =

EP by Brandi Carlile
- Released: February 8, 2010
- Genre: Pop rock
- Length: 14:55
- Label: Sony Music Entertainment

Brandi Carlile chronology
Give Up the Ghost (2009)	XOBC (2010)	Live at Benaroya Hall with the Seattle Symphony (2011)

XOBC is an EP by American singer-songwriter Brandi Carlile, released in February 2010 in the United States through Sony Music Entertainment via iTunes. The collection has a Valentine's Day theme and contains two cover songs (The Beatles' "All You Need Is Love" and Bryan Adams' "Heaven") along with three original tracks. Songs for the collection were recorded around Christmas following the release of her previous studio album Give Up the Ghost (2009).

In the United States, XOBC reached peak positions of number eighty on the Billboard 200, number thirteen on Billboard's Top Digital Albums chart, number one on the Top Folk Albums chart and number eighteen on the Top Rock Albums chart.

== Content ==
XOBC totals approximately fifteen minutes in length and contains five tracks, including cover versions of The Beatles' "All You Need Is Love" and Bryan Adams' "Heaven" and three original tracks.

== Track listing ==
No.	Title	Writer(s)	Length
1.	"All You Need Is Love"	Lennon–McCartney	2:48
2.	"Love Songs"	Brandi Carlile	3:08
3.	"Way to You"	Tim Hanseroth	3:11
4.	"Us Again"	Carlile, T. Hanseroth, Phil Hanseroth	2:27
5.	"Heaven"	Bryan Adams, Jim Vallance	3:29

== Chart performance ==
In the United States, XOBC reached peak positions of number eighty on the Billboard 200, number thirteen on Billboard's Top Digital Albums chart, number one on the Top Folk Albums chart and number eighteen on the Top Rock Albums chart.

Chart (2010)	Peak position
U.S. Billboard 200	80
U.S. Top Digital Albums	13
U.S. Top Folk Albums	1
U.S. Top Rock Albums	18
