= Sweet Western Sound =

Studio album by Tanya Tucker
- Released: June 2, 2023
- Genre: Country
- Length: 34:54
- Label: Fantasy
- Producer: Brandi Carlile; Shooter Jennings

Tanya Tucker chronology
Live from the Troubadour (2020)	Sweet Western Sound (2023)

Singles from Sweet Western Sound
- 1. "Ready as I'll Never Be" Released: October 21, 2022; 2. "Kindness" Released: April 5, 2023; 3. "When the Rodeo Is Over (Where Does the Cowboy Go?)" Released: May 5, 2023; 4. "Breakfast in Birmingham" Released: May 30, 2023

Sweet Western Sound is the 27th solo studio album by American country music singer and songwriter Tanya Tucker. It was released on June 2, 2023, by Fantasy Records. The album was produced by Brandi Carlile and Shooter Jennings and is the follow-up to Tucker's Grammy-winning 2019 album, While I'm Livin'.

== Release and promotion ==
On October 21, 2022, Tucker released the single "Ready as I'll Never Be" to promote the documentary The Return of Tanya Tucker. The song won Best Original Song for a Documentary at the 13th Hollywood Music in Media Awards.

Tucker was announced as one of the 2022 inductees into the Country Music Hall of Fame on April 3, 2023.

The album was officially announced on April 5, 2023, along with the release of its lead single, "Kindness".

Tucker celebrated the album's release with two shows at Ryman Auditorium in Nashville on June 3 and June 4.

== Background ==
"Letter to Linda" is a tribute to Linda Ronstadt and makes reference to several of her songs, including "Heart Like a Wheel" and "Desperado". "That Wasn't Me" was previously recorded by Carlile and featured on her 2012 album Bear Creek.

== Track listing ==
Sweet Western Sound track listing
No.	Title	Writer(s)	Length
1.	"Tanya"	Billy Joe Shaver; Tanya Tucker	0:49
2.	"Kindness"	Tim Hanseroth; Phil Hanseroth	3:21
3.	"Breakfast in Birmingham" (featuring Brandi Carlile)	Brandi Carlile; Bernie Taupin	3:30
4.	"Waltz Across a Moment"	Shooter Jennings	4:08
5.	"Ready as I'll Never Be"	Carlile; Tucker	4:01
6.	"The List"	Carlile; Tucker	4:02
7.	"Letter to Linda"	Tucker; Jennings	4:03
8.	"City of Gold"	JT Nero	3:17
9.	"That Wasn't Me"	Carlile; P. Hanseroth; T. Hanseroth	3:51
10.	"When the Rodeo Is Over (Where Does the Cowboy Go?)"	Billy Don Burns; Craig Dillingham	4:02
Total length:			34:54

== Charts ==
Chart peaks for Sweet Western Sound
Chart (2023)	Peak
UK Americana Albums (OCC)	15

== Personnel ==
Musicians

- Tanya Tucker – vocals (tracks 2–10)
- Billy Joe Shaver – vocals (1)
- Brandi Carlile – background vocals (2–6, 9, 10), vocals (3, 7, 8), piano (5)
- Ted Russell Kamp – banjo (2, 3), bass guitar (3, 7–10)
- Phil Hanseroth – bass guitar (2, 5, 6), acoustic guitar (3), background vocals (5)
- Matt Chamberlain – drums, percussion (2, 3, 5–9)
- Chris Masterson – electric guitar (2–5, 7, 9, 10), baritone guitar (6), acoustic guitar (8)
- Shooter Jennings – piano (2–10), synthesizer (2), Mellotron (9)
- John Schreffler – steel guitar (2–6, 8, 9)
- Tim Hanseroth – acoustic guitar (3, 7, 9, 10), background vocals (5)
- Alabama Jennings – celesta, organ, strings (7)
- Paul Franklin – steel guitar (7, 8, 10)
- Jamie Douglass – drums, percussion (10)

Technical

- Brandi Carlile – production
- Shooter Jennings – production, engineering
- Pete Lyman – mastering
- Trina Shoemaker – mixing (1, 3–10)
- Brandon Bell – mixing (2), engineering (3, 4, 6–10)
- David Spreng – recording
- Nate Haessly – engineering assistance
