= Have You Ever (disambiguation) =

"Have You Ever" is a 2001 song by S Club 7.

Have You Ever may also refer to:

- "Have You Ever?", a 1998 song by Brandy
- Have You Ever, a 1976 album and song by Joe Tex
- "Have You Ever", a song by The Offspring from the 1998 album Americana
- "Have You Ever", a song by Incubus from the 2001 album Morning View
- "Have You Ever", a song by Brandi Carlile from the 2007 album The Story
