= Second EP =

The Second EP

EP by The Eames Era
- Released: August 17, 2004
- Recorded: 2004
- Studio: Plusgood Studio, Baton Rouge, Louisiana
- Genre: Indie pop
- Length: 13:21
- Label: C Student Records

The Eames Era chronology
The Second EP (2004)	Double Dutch (2005)

Professional ratings
Review scores
Source	Rating
Tiny Mix Tapes	link
Allmusic	link

The Second EP is the first album released by Baton Rouge, Louisiana based indie pop group The Eames Era. The title "The Second EP" refers to the demo EP the band recorded in early 2003 before signing with the C Student Records label. The album's lead track, "Could Be Anything", was featured on the soundtrack for American medical drama Grey's Anatomy and on Canadian teen drama Falcon Beach. This also coincided with the release of the band's debut full-length album Double Dutch.

== Track listing ==
1. "Could Be Anything" - 3:45
2. "All of Seventeen" - 3:21
3. "You May Not Know My Name" - 3:43
4. "I Said" - 2:32

== See also ==
- Grey's Anatomy (soundtrack)
