= The Eames Era =

American indie pop band

- Origin: Baton Rouge, Louisiana
- Genre: Indie pop
- Years active: 2002–2008
- Label: C Student Records
- Spinoffs: Generationals
- Members: Ashlin Phillips (Vocals); Greg Gauthreaux (Drums); Brian Waits (Bass); Grant Widmer (Guitar); Ted Joyner (Guitar)
- Website: Official website, MySpace page

For the designers who were the inspiration for the name of the musical group, please see Charles and Ray Eames

The Eames Era were a Baton Rouge, Louisiana based indie pop quintet active from 2003 to 2008. The band first received broad attention when one of its songs was featured in an episode of Grey's Anatomy in 2005. The band released one EP and two full-length albums during its career.

== History ==
The band was founded by New Orleans guitarists Grant Widmer and Ted Joyner. The band started in 2002, Grant and Ted's junior year at Louisiana State University, when the two former high school friends enlisted drummer Greg Gauthreaux and bass player Brian Waits to form "The Double Zeros". Singer Ashlin Phillips auditioned for the band in December 2002, after work had begun writing and practicing for the band's first gig. The band's name honors famed designers Charles and Ray Eames.

By 2003 the now complete lineup became "The Eames Era" and had begun recording a 3-track demo in Grant's garage. Later that year the band signed on to the C Student Records label to release their first single "Could Be Anything" April 2004. After winning an award at the university's annual independent film festival they embarked on their first tour along the East Coast. Upon returning the band released "The Second EP" on the C Student label.

The album's lead track on the EP, "Could Be Anything", was featured on the Abercrombie & Fitch website and two television shows (Grey's Anatomy and Falcon Beach), and received major airplay on college radio stations nationwide. In October 2005, shortly after graduating from Louisiana State University, the band released their full-length debut "Double Dutch". The week of the album's release, the band's tour bus got in an accident with a military truck on the way home from a photo shoot, thus cancelling a tour booked for November that year. The military truck was only in the area for providing Hurricane Katrina aid.

In 2007, the Eames Era won $2500 in the Yaris SXSW band video contest. In April 2007, the band released its second full-length album, "Heroes and Sheroes." The song "When You Were a Millionaire" from that album was featured on MTV's new reality show "I'm from Rolling Stone," running at the beginning and end of each of the ten episodes. That song as well as "Watson On Your Side" have videos made by Untucked Films.

In April 2008, Grant Widmer wrote music blog The Rockist Society to let them know the band had decided to go their separate ways:

That's right, The Eames Era are no more. Ashlin and Greg moved to Chicago in the past few months and they are on to other things. Ted, Brian and I have also moved to New Orleans and we are hard at work on a new album. As I said before, Brian got married this week and his life has been very busy so it's still unclear what kind of role he'll have in the new group. But Ted and I have been traveling to record with Daniel Black, the producer of our last album, in D.C. since January. We are about 1/3 finished and hope to be all done in May. Then it will be time to tour for a while.

Grant Widmer and Ted Joyner subsequently formed a new band, Generationals, whose debut album 'Con Law' was released on July 21, 2009.

Ashlin died in Lake Charles, Louisiana on September 1, 2025.

== Discography ==
- The Second EP
  (2004)
  C Student Records
- Double Dutch
  (2005)
  C Student Records
- Heroes + Sheroes
  (2007)
  Self-Released
