= Song Beneath the Song =

- Grey's Anatomy episode
- Episode no.: Season 7 Episode 18
- Directed by: Tony Phelan
- Written by: Shonda Rhimes
- Original air date: March 31, 2011
- Running time: 43 minutes

Guest appearances
- Kate Walsh as Addison Montgomery; Rachael Taylor as Dr. Lucy Fields; Daniel Sunjata as Eli; Scott Foley as Henry Burton

Episode chronology
← Previous "This is How We Do It"	Next → "It's a Long Way Back"
- Grey's Anatomy season 7

"Song Beneath the Song", also known as Grey's Anatomy: The Music Event, is the eighteenth episode of the seventh season of the American television medical drama Grey's Anatomy, and the 144th episode overall. It was named after a song initially performed by American singer Maria Taylor. Written by series creator Shonda Rhimes and directed by Tony Phelan, it premiered on ABC in the United States on March 31, 2011. It is the series's first musical episode, and features the cast performing songs previously featured within the program. It is accompanied by a soundtrack album, titled Grey's Anatomy: The Music Event, also released on March 31, 2011.

The episode revolves around Callie Torres (Sara Ramirez) and Arizona Robbins (Jessica Capshaw), just after they are involved in a vehicular collision. Various songs are performed by the cast members, as they attempt to save the life of Torres. Rhimes originally idealized the episode at the conception of the drama, while the show remained untitled. The episode opened to polarized reviews from television critics, and it was the second most-watched program of the night. "Song Beneath the Song" was ranked in several "best and worst" lists, and the soundtrack also charted on the Billboard 200.

== Plot ==
The episode opens with a voice-over narration from Callie Torres (Sara Ramirez) about the brain's mystery, its ability to adapt, and how little we truly understand about its complexities, especially when it faces trauma.

En route to a weekend getaway, surgeons Callie Torres (Sara Ramirez) and Arizona Robbins (Jessica Capshaw) are involved in a vehicular collision, moments after Robbins proposes marriage. Torres suffers severe injuries, which endanger both her life and the life of her unborn child. She and Robbins are taken to Seattle Grace Mercy West Hospital, the institute at which they both work. Their colleagues attempt to save Torres, while Robbins and Mark Sloan (Eric Dane), the father of Torres's baby, stand by. Torres's many injuries include neurological trauma. While barely conscious, she hallucinates an uninjured version of herself standing beside her. The hallucinatory Torres begins to sing, and is gradually joined by the doctors treating her. This singing continues throughout the episode, as Torres's projection of herself attempts to reach out to Robbins.

Torres goes into cardiac arrest and is taken into an operating room she is temporarily stabilized, pending further surgery. She is moved into intensive care, while neonatal surgeon Addison Montgomery (Kate Walsh) is flown in by helicopter in case the baby has to be delivered prematurely. Robbins and Sloan argue over Torres's treatment; Robbins believes that Torres would not risk endangering the baby, but Sloan argues for saving Torres at all costs. The attending surgeons devise a treatment plan, led by trauma surgeon Owen Hunt (Kevin McKidd). As they do so, Torres dreams about the moments preceding the accident. Her dream self sings to Robbins, interspersed with shots of the hospital staff singing and dancing with their own partners. Dr. Cristina Yang (Sandra Oh) suggests treating Torres with a high-risk but potentially effective cardiothoracic procedure she learned from her old mentor, Preston Burke (Isaiah Washington). Her current mentor, Teddy Altman (Kim Raver), refuses to perform it, but when Torres's condition deteriorates and she is rushed back into surgery, Hunt agrees that Yang should attempt the procedure.

When Torres again goes into cardiac arrest, Montgomery delivers her daughter at twenty-three week's gestation. The baby is initially unable to breathe, so with Sloan's support, Robbins steps in and is able to revive her. Across the operating room, Torres's condition begins to improve. Once the surgery is complete, the doctors deal with their own affairs; Sloan's former partner Lexie Grey (Chyler Leigh) commits to her new relationship with resident Jackson Avery (Jesse Williams); Lexie's sister, Meredith Grey (Ellen Pompeo) confesses that she was jealous of Torres's pregnancy, which prompts her husband Derek Shepherd (Patrick Dempsey) to promise that they will have a child together; Altman tells Yang that she can no longer teach her; Sloan and Robbins bond over their shared parenthood. Later, as Robbins keeps a vigil by Torres's bedside, the hallucinatory Torres is able to rouse her recovering self. As she regains consciousness, Torres accepts Robbins's proposal.

== Production ==
=== Conception ===
Since Grey's Anatomy began, series creator Shonda Rhimes had planned to produce a musical episode. She first discussed the idea during filming of the pilot episode, when the program was as yet untitled. Rhimes felt that seasons 6 and 7 were the right time for the crew to "try anything and everything [they had] always wanted to do," and explained that she "finally [had] the right idea and the right talent to make [a musical episode] happen." Filming began 7 1/2 years after Rhimes initially raised the idea. The episode was shot in approximately 2 weeks. Though cast member Dempsey jokingly referred to the episode as Glee M.D., Rhimes intended for it to differ from other musical television episodes. She called it the opposite of "Once More, with Feeling," the "all-out, show-stopping," musical episode of Buffy the Vampire Slayer, as she aimed to "do something that was musical without being a musical."

Rhimes said she had difficulty getting the network's permission. She added: "I begged the studio people. I begged the network people. I took these people to dinner and begged. I jumped out at these people in bathrooms and begged. And they all smiled politely but what they were clearly really thinking was, 'This woman is an idiot.'"

Rhimes also told about delays in producing this episode:

Explaining what the heck took us so long is too complicated to go into here. There are a lot of reasons – I was busy telling other awesome stories at Seattle Grace, [...] I was raising my tiny human, my musical talent involves oboe-playing and nothing else, the network thought it was the dumbest idea they’d ever heard of and refused to do it.

The script was written by Rhimes in November 2010. She centered the episode around Ramirez's character, Callie, and stated that the storyline would have developed regardless of whether it involved musical performances. Sara Ramirez used the opportunity to launch their career as a singer-songwriter; an alternate version of "The Story" is included on their debut EP, released four days prior to the episode's premiere.

In this episode, Mark and Arizona improve their relationship. Capshaw said, "The traumatic circumstance leads to them having a greater understanding of each other and then appreciation, and then need for each other and desire to be in each other’s lives. They come to care, I think, for one another."

=== Musical performances ===
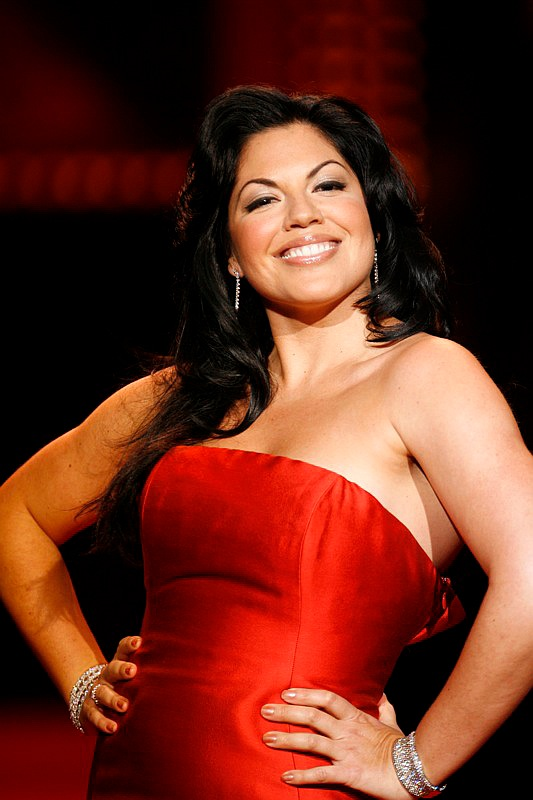
Ramirez (pictured) was the episode's primary vocalist.

Rhimes, executive producer Betsy Beers and director Tony Phelan selected songs that had become well known by their use in Grey's Anatomy, and chose "the most iconic ones, the ones that best suited [their] singers, and the ones that made the most sense." The multiple cover versions include the program's theme tune, "Cosy in the Rocket" by Psapp. The primary vocalists are cast members Ramirez, McKidd, Leigh and Chandra Wilson. The soundtrack also includes "How to Save a Life" by The Fray and "Running on Sunshine" by Jesus Jackson, performed as ensemble pieces by Ramirez, McKidd, Leigh, Daniel Sunjata, Scott Foley, Ellen Pompeo, Justin Chambers, Raver, Dane, and Capshaw. Ramirez, McKidd and Wilson also perform together on Snow Patrol's "Chasing Cars." Ramirez is the lead vocalist on "The Story" by Brandi Carlile, and "Grace" by Kate Havnevik, which also features the other female cast members, including Leigh and Sarah Drew on the chorus. Capshaw duets with Ramirez on KT Tunstall's "Universe & U." Wilson is the lead vocalist on "Wait" by Get Set Go, McKidd on "How We Operate" by Gomez, and Leigh on Anna Nalick's "Breathe (2 AM)."

When it first came up I was nervous, but at the same time I was just thinking, 'Hey, this is a really great opportunity for me to actually explore this side of me and be able to just let that go and have fun and know that I'm in a very safe and encouraging environment.' I was and I did and I had such a wonderful time.

— Chyler Leigh's impressions on singing for the episode

Leigh said that some actors were not "excited" about singing but still could participate in the episode. "There were certain ways in which the scenes were written, even if there was a song in there, that perhaps a line was spoken instead of sung," she said.

A vocal coach was enlisted to help the cast. Music director Chris Horvath was recruited to arrange the selected songs for the cast. The arrangements took around two months, with vocals recorded over four days in February 2011. Horvath praised the cast's response to the episode, noting that only four performers had "serious vocal talent," while some had "barely sung in the shower" before. Those with professional singing experience include Ramirez, who won a Tony Award for their role in the musical Spamalot, and Wilson, who appeared in the Broadway production of Caroline, or Change. Cast members' reactions toward the episode varied. Pompeo initially deemed the idea "crazy," but changed her mind following the first read-through. Recurring cast member Sunjata stated that singing was "a bit out of [his] comfort zone," but found it an "interesting challenge," and McKidd deemed it "very exciting to do something that's completely out on a limb for the show."

== Reception ==
=== Pre-broadcast commentary ===
Critical response prior to broadcast was mixed. TVLine's Michael Ausiello assessed that the episode would "either be a show-stopping triumph or a spectacular failure," with no possible middle ground. William Keck of TV Guide initially had "serious doubts," which were allayed by a visit to the set, during which he listened to the soundtrack. Keck likened it to the "much-beloved early seasons of Grey's, when music played a vital role on the show." Entertainment Weekly's Dan Snierson predicted heavy use of Auto Tune, though fellow EW writer Jennifer Armstrong was optimistic that the episode would be a success, commenting: "I have faith. I like musicals, I like Grey's. I'm rooting for this to work."

=== Ratings ===
During its original broadcast, "Song Beneath the Song" was watched by an average of 13.09 million American viewers. It attained a 4.9/13 Nielsen rating/share in the 18–49 demographic, making it the second highest-rated program of the night, behind only American Idol on the Fox network. The rating was the second-highest of the seventh season until that point, and a 30% increase from the previous episode, "This is How We Do It," which was watched by 2.4 million fewer viewers.

In Canada, where the episode also aired on March 31, 2011, it was watched by 3.18 million viewers. Viewership again increased on "This is How We Do It," which attained 2.63 million viewers. However, while the preceding episode was the most-viewed scripted show for the week of its original broadcast, "Song Beneath the Song" ranked second, behind The Big Bang Theory.

=== Post-broadcast commentary ===
Following the first minutes of the drama, reactions on Twitter were polarized. Nicole Golden from TV Fanatic gave the episode 4.5 stars out of 5.0. She found that "overall, the concept worked since music really has always played a big part in the show. Some songs were more appropriate and/or better performed than others, though." She also wrote the concept worked in part because it was new but noted "the format would probably not have the same effect if used in future episodes." Even though Boston Herald's critic Mark Perigard was not a fan of the concept, saying "the Grey's Anatomy event proved how tricky it is for an established show, especially a drama, to pull off a musical episode," he did like several actors' performances. He wrote: "Chandra Wilson and Chyler Leigh (whom I never have anything good to say about) delivered some impressive vocal work. Eric Dane did some of his best acting of his career last night as an anxious father-to-be terrified he would lose his best friend." Lyneka Little of The Wall Street Journal wrote, "If Glee and ER had a baby it would be tonight’s episode of the medical drama Grey’s Anatomy titled 'Song Beneath the Song'." In his review of the episode Alan Sepinwall of HitFix wrote "Like Grey's Anatomy as a whole, some parts were unintentionally silly, others were surprisingly powerful, and it was rarely dull, at least."

Patrick Dempsey admitted that the musical episode might not have been showrunner Shonda Rhimes's best idea. He explained: "It's very difficult to keep it fresh when you're doing 24 episodes a year. Shonda Rhimes has a lot of ideas, and she is in a position where she can take more chances. Sometimes that works, sometimes it does not. Last year we had the singing episode, which I think was a big mistake. But you have to try."

=== Accolades ===
In 2011, the episode was ranked #19 on the TV Guide Network special, 25 Biggest TV Blunders 2. It was included in TV Guide's list "The Worst Of 2011" saying, "Sara Ramirez has powerhouse pipes, but what this episode desperately needed was a better playlist." BuddyTV, however, ranked it #43 on its list of 2011's 50 Best TV Episodes and it also appeared on Digital Spy's shortlist of "TV's Best Musical Episodes." Supervising Music Editor Jennifer Barak and Music Editors Carli Barber and Jessica Harrison were nominated in the Best Sound Editing: Short Form Musical in Television category at the 2012 Golden Reel Awards for their work on the episode.

== Soundtrack ==
Grey's Anatomy: The Music Event

Soundtrack album by Grey's Anatomy Cast
- Released: March 31, 2011
- Recorded: February 2011
- Length: 35:48

=== Track listing ===
No.	Title	Writer(s)	Performer(s)	Length
1.	"Chasing Cars" (Original by Snow Patrol)	Gary Lightbody	Sara Ramirez, Kevin McKidd, Chandra Wilson	4:11
2.	"Breathe" (Original by Anna Nalick)	Anna Nalick	Chyler Leigh	4:36
3.	"How We Operate" (Original by Gomez)	Ben Ottewell	Kevin McKidd	4:30
4.	"Wait" (Original by Get Set Go)		Chandra Wilson, Sarah Drew, Chyler Leigh	3:22
5.	"Runnin' on Sunshine" (Original by Jesus Jackson)	Norman Cook, Roland Clark	Sara Ramirez, Daniel Sunjata, Kevin McKidd, Scott Foley, Justin Chambers, Chandra Wilson, Jessica Capshaw, Kim Raver, Chyler Leigh, Ellen Pompeo, and Patrick Dempsey	4:05
6.	"Universe & U" (Original by KT Tunstall)	Tunstall, Pleasure	Sara Ramirez, Jessica Capshaw	4:05
7.	"Grace" (Original by Kate Havnevik)	Kate Havnevik	Sara Ramirez, Sarah Drew, Chyler Leigh	3:45
8.	"How to Save a Life" (Original by The Fray)	Isaac Slade, Joe King	Kevin McKidd, Kim Raver, Ellen Pompeo, Eric Dane, Chyler Leigh, Jessica Capshaw, Sara Ramirez, Chandra Wilson, Sarah Drew, Justin Chambers, Kate Walsh	3:46
9.	"The Story" (Original by Brandi Carlile)	Phil Hanseroth	Sara Ramirez	3:28

=== Chart history ===
Grey's Anatomy: The Music Event debuted at #24 on the Billboard 200, with 19,000 copies sold. It reached #2 on the U.S. Soundtracks chart, and was #5 on the Independent Album chart. "The Story" entered the Billboard Hot 100 singles chart at #69, and the Canadian Hot 100 at #72.
