= Double Dutch (The Eames Era album) =

Studio album by The Eames Era
- Released: October 18, 2005
- Recorded: 2005 in Plusgood Studio, Baton Rouge, Louisiana
- Genre: Indie pop
- Length: 33:59
- Label: C Student Records
- Producer: Casey McAllister

The Eames Era chronology
The Second EP (2004)	Double Dutch (2005)	Heroes + Sheroes (2007)

Professional ratings
Review scores
Source	Rating
Tiny Mix Tapes	link
PopMatters link	

Double Dutch is the debut full-length album of Baton Rouge, Louisiana, based indie pop group The Eames Era. It was released shortly after the band members' graduation from Louisiana State University, symbolizing the work put into the album and the newfangled maturity of the band.

== Track listing ==
1. Go To Sleep –- 4:10
2. Got Your Note –- 2:31
3. I Don't Mind –- 3:24
4. Listen For The Sun –- 3:25
5. Washed Out –- 2:54
6. Pay Attention –- 2:28
7. Talk Talk –- 3:08
8. Old Folks –- 2:32
9. Year of the Waitress –- 3:21
10. Boy Came In –- 2:31
11. Promises –- 3:36
