= Sara Ramirez =

Mexican-American actor (born 1975)

Sara Ramírez
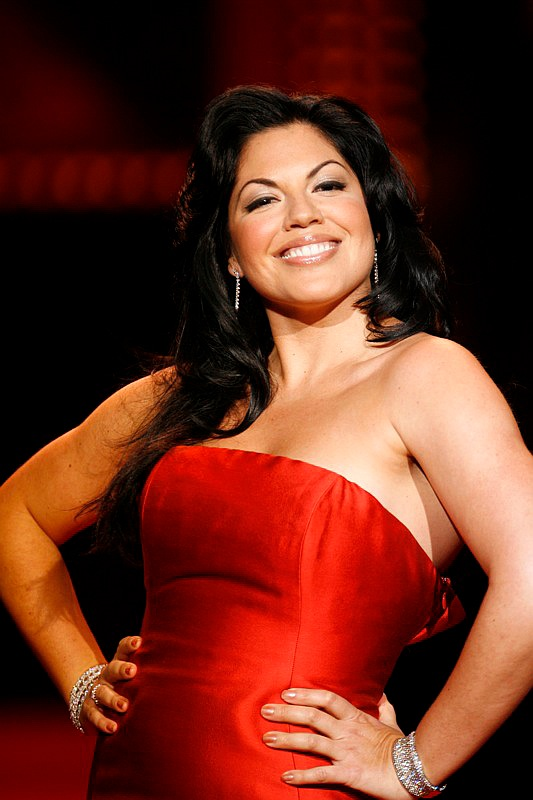
- Ramírez in 2008
- Born: Sara Elena Ramírez Vargas; August 31, 1975 (age 51); Mazatlán, Sinaloa, Mexico
- Citizenship: Mexico; United States
- Education: Juilliard School (BFA)
- Occupations: Actor; singer; activist
- Years active: 1998–present
- Spouse: Ryan Debolt (m. 2012; sep. 2021)

Sara Elena Ramírez Vargas (Spanish: [ˈsaɾa eˈlena raˈmiɾes ˈbaɾɣas]; born August 31, 1975) is a Mexican and American actor, singer and activist. Born in Mazatlán, Sinaloa, Ramírez moved from Mexico to the United States at eight years old, eventually graduating with a fine arts degree from the Juilliard School.

Ramírez began acting in Broadway productions, making their (Note: Ramirez uses they/them pronouns.) debut in Paul Simon's The Capeman, and later ventured into film and television roles. Ramírez's breakthrough came with their portrayal of the original Lady of the Lake in the 2005 Broadway musical Spamalot, winning the Tony Award for Best Featured Actress in a Musical. On Grey's Anatomy, they portrayed Dr. Callie Torres, one of the longest-running LGBT characters in US television history, appearing in 11 seasons and 239 episodes. (Note: Kerry Weaver from the TV show ER, portrayed by Laura Innes, appeared in 13 seasons and 249 episodes.) Ramírez's volunteered addition of the character's bisexuality marked one of the earliest series regular queer roles on primetime television. After departing from the series, Ramírez came out as bisexual and later non-binary, using they/them pronouns. They later portrayed the bisexual and non-binary roles of Kat Sandoval on Madam Secretary and Che Díaz on And Just Like That....

Ramírez debuted as a voice actor in the 1999 PlayStation video game Um Jammer Lammy, where they voiced its title character Lammy in a spin-off to PaRappa The Rapper. They also voiced Queen Miranda in the Disney Junior animated series Sofia the First (2012–2018). Ramírez released their first single "Silent Night" in 2009. Their self-titled EP debuted at number 37 on the Billboard 200 in 2011.

Ramírez's extensive campaigns for LGBT rights won the Ally for Equality Award from the Human Rights Campaign Foundation in 2015. In addition to the Tony Award, Ramírez has also been the recipient of a Screen Actors Guild Award and a Satellite Award, among other accolades.

== Early life ==
Sara Elena Ramírez was born on August 31, 1975, in Mazatlán, Sinaloa, in northwestern Mexico. Both of Ramírez's parents are Mexican. When Ramírez was eight years old, their parents divorced, and Ramírez went to live with their mother, eventually settling in Tierrasanta, San Diego, California. Ramírez's interest in music encouraged their mother to send them to San Diego School of Creative and Performing Arts, where their singing talent was discovered during an audition. Ramírez started acting in stage productions in high school.

After roles in the plays Into the Woods, Hello, Dolly!, and Annie, Ramírez was recommended to study drama at Juilliard School, from which they graduated with a Bachelor of Fine Arts. While at Juilliard, Ramírez further worked on their acting skills and trained as a vocalist. Ramírez speaks both Spanish and English fluently.

== Career ==
=== Broadway breakthrough and other roles (1998–2005) ===
While still at Juilliard, Ramírez was discovered by a casting director and was offered the role of Wahzinak in Paul Simon's 1998 Broadway musical The Capeman. Based on the life of the Puerto Rican gangster Salvador Agron, the production garnered negative reviews. They made their screen debut in the same year, with a minor role in the romantic comedy You've Got Mail. Starring Tom Hanks and Meg Ryan, the film had Ramírez play Rose, a Zabar's cashier who was "very serious about her line's cash-only policy."

Ramírez's first voice acting role was the titular protagonist of Lammy, an anxious guitarist, in the 1999 video game Um Jammer Lammy. The game was a guitar-based spin-off of PaRappa the Rapper exclusive to Sony's PlayStation console, involving Lammy getting to her band's concert within a tight fifteen-minute window. In 2001, they reprised their role in PaRappa the Rapper 2, a series sequel developed for PlayStation 2, but had a smaller role involving a cameo appearance during the song "Hair Scare". Ramírez also voiced Lammy in promotions for the CD release of in-universe girl band MilkCan's album Make It Sweet!, and FMV cutscenes included in the arcade version of the game entitled Um Jammer Lammy NOW!.

In 1999, Ramírez appeared in Mark Lamos's The Gershwins' Fascinating Rhythm (1999). They garnered praise for their performance and received an Outer Critics Circle Award nomination for their role. Charles Isherwood of Variety praised their "beautiful, smoky voice" but was critical of their "torchy" performance of "The Man I Love," which ignored "the wry irony that infuses Ira's lyrics". Ramírez then appeared in the 2001 Broadway production of Edward Kleban's A Class Act. They replaced Julia Murney (from the off-Broadway) to play the role of Felecia, the protagonist Ed's boss. The same year, they starred in other productions including Fascinating Rhythm and Dreamgirls, and then performed in the 2002 production of The Vagina Monologues with Tovah Feldshuh and Suzanne Bertish. During this time, Ramírez also appeared in guest roles in several television series, including NYPD Blue, Law & Order: SVU, Third Watch, and Spin City among others.

Ramírez's breakout role came upon being cast as the Lady of the Lake in Eric Idle and John Du Prez's musical Spamalot. Based on the 1975 film Monty Python and the Holy Grail, the musical opened on Broadway in 2005 to widespread acclaim. Ramírez was singled out for their performance, winning several awards including the 2005 Tony Award for Best Featured Actress in a Musical and the Drama League Award for Distinguished Performance. Ben Brantley of The New York Times described them as "a toothsome devourer of scenery", and another reviewer for The Playgoer emphasizing their stage presence remarked that their "intensity is totally serious and totally ludicrous and totally on key". An Entertainment Weekly review gave them the highest praise by calling them a show-stealer.

=== Grey's Anatomy and other projects (2006–2021) ===
After success on Broadway, Ramírez joined the cast of the ABC medical drama Grey's Anatomy in a recurring role as Dr. Callie Torres, a love interest for Dr. George O'Malley, in the show's second season. On a special Grey's Anatomy-themed episode of The Oprah Winfrey Show, Ramírez revealed that top executives from ABC, who were greatly impressed by their performance in Spamalot, offered them a role in any ABC show they wanted. Ramírez picked Grey's, as they were already a fan of the show. Ramírez further explained that at their initial audition, the producers liked them and intended to add them to the show but did not know who to cast them as. Ramírez also said they were in awe of how the executives said, "Pick a show, any show," explaining that it is rare. The series creator and executive producer, Shonda Rhimes explained, "I was looking for a girlfriend for George, but it was in the infancy stages, so I had no idea what I was looking for." Rhimes built the character around Ramírez after Rhimes met them. Ramírez, who was initially given a recurring status at the time of the character's inception, received a star billing in the show's third season, alongside fellow cast member Eric Dane, who portrayed Dr. Mark Sloan.

Ramírez provided a cappella vocals in the song "Silent Night" for the soundtrack of the show's sixth-season episode "Holidaze," airing on November 19, 2009. Ramírez served as the main vocalist for the musical episode of Grey's Anatomy, "Song Beneath the Song", which aired on March 31, 2011. Marcus James Dixon of Gold Derby called them the "show-stopper" and wrote that they "stole the show in a gut-wrenching performance worthy of an Emmy award."

As the series progressed, the character's popularity soared and Ramírez garnered widespread recognition and critical acclaim for their portrayal of a complex character on television. Maggie Fremont, a TV critic for Vulture, reviewed Ramírez and Jessica Capshaw's performances during an 11th season episode, calling them "goddesses walking amongst mere mortals". Ramírez was nominated for Outstanding Actress in a Drama Television Series at the Alma Awards in 2007 and 2008. Also in 2007, at the 13th Screen Actors Guild Awards, the cast of Grey's Anatomy received the Award for Outstanding Performance by an Ensemble in a Drama Series. They and the cast were nominated for the same award in 2008. In 2011, at the 42nd NAACP Image Awards, Ramírez was nominated for Outstanding Supporting Actress in a Drama Series.

In May 2016, Ramírez left the show at the conclusion of the 12th season, after having played the character for a decade. They released a statement saying, "I'm deeply grateful to have spent the last 10 years with my family at Grey's Anatomy and ABC, but for now I'm taking some welcome time off." Rhimes wrote of Ramírez's work on the show, "Dr. Callie Torres came into our lives dancing it out in her underwear almost a decade ago, and I could not be happier or more proud of her journey. Sara Ramírez's performance inspired me as well as millions of fans each week."

Ramírez turned producer with the 2016 teen comedy film, Loserville. The project was released in partnership with the Pacer Foundation's Center for Bullying Prevention & Stomp Out Bullying.

From 2017 to 2019, Ramírez co-starred in the fourth and fifth seasons of the CBS political drama Madam Secretary, replacing Bebe Neuwirth, who played Nadine Tolliver. They played Kat Sandoval, the new policy advisor of Secretary Elizabeth McCord (Téa Leoni).

In 2021, Ramírez was cast as non-binary podcast host and comedian Che Díaz in the Sex and the City revival series And Just Like That.... The character of Díaz has received universally negative reviews from fans and critics, with Kevin Fallon of The Daily Beast calling them "the worst character on TV."

== Personal life ==
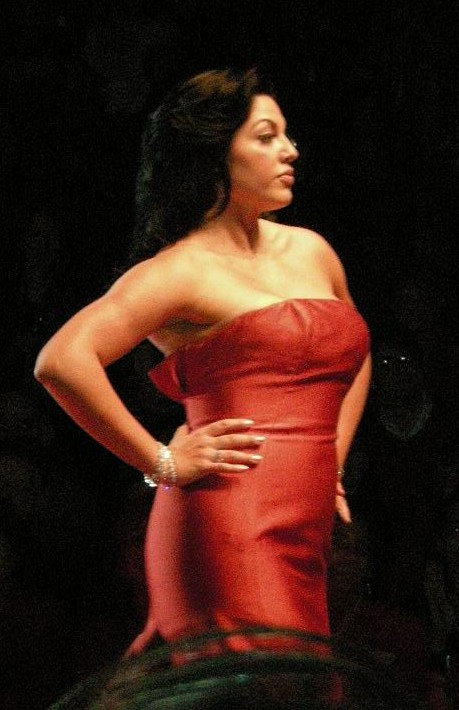
Ramírez at a charity fashion show to benefit The Heart Truth.

On June 27, 2011, Ramírez got engaged to longtime boyfriend Ryan DeBolt, a business analyst at TIMEC in Paris, France. They were married on July 4, 2012, in a private beachside ceremony in New York. On July 6, 2021, Ramírez announced in an Instagram post that they had separated from DeBolt. In June 2024, Ramírez filed for divorce from DeBolt, three years after announcing the couple's separation, citing irreconcilable differences as the reason for the split. Ramírez also requested the pair's assets be divided per their prenuptial agreement.

In September 2016, Ramírez donated their hair to Locks of Love, an organization that makes wigs for children who suffer from medical conditions that lead to hair loss. Afterward, they sported a buzz cut, styled as an undercut.

In October 2016, Ramírez described themself as queer and bisexual at the True Colors Fund's 40 To None Summit (now known as the Impact Summit) in Los Angeles, California. In an email to the Huffington Post, they wrote that their decision to come out publicly was a "very organic and natural" one.

In August 2020, Ramírez uploaded a photo to Instagram wherein they came out as non-binary, writing:

In me is the capacity to be

Girlish boy
Boyish girl
Boyish boy
Girlish girl
All
Neither

#nonbinary

Prior to this post, they had updated their Twitter and Instagram biographies to reflect she/they pronouns, which were changed to they/them sometime in 2021.

== Off-screen work ==
=== Singing career ===
Ramírez released their first single, a rendition of "Silent Night", in 2009. The song was featured in the tenth episode of the sixth season of Grey's Anatomy. Their debut self-titled extended play (EP) came out in March 2011 on the iTunes Store under the label of Atrevida Records. The EP included four songs, including a cover of "The Story", which was originally recorded by Brandi Carlile for her 2007 album of the same name. Two of the three songs were co-written by Ramírez and the album's writer-producer Rob Giles. Sara Ramirez debuted at number 37 on the Billboard 200, number 9 on Billboard's Independent Albums chart, and number 38 on the Canadian Albums Chart. "The Story" debuted the same week at number 69 on the Billboard Hot 100, number 72 on the Canadian Hot 100, and number 34 on the Irish Singles Chart. Soundtracks for Monty Python's Spamalot (2005) and Grey's Anatomy: The Music Event (2011) were released under the labels of Decca Records and ABC Studios respectively.

=== Philanthropy ===
Ramírez is an activist and extensively campaigns for LGBT rights. They are a member of the True Colors United board of directors and The Task Force, and the San Diego, New York, and San Francisco LGBT Centers. They spoke out in support of homeless LGBTQ youth at a True Colors Fund conference. In addition, Ramírez supports other groups including BiNetUSA, Bisexual Organizing Project, American Institute of Bisexuality, NDLON, and Mujeres De Maíz.

In 2015, they were awarded the Ally for Equality Award by the Human Rights Campaign Foundation.

In 2023 and 2024, Ramírez became a vocal activist in support of Palestinian liberation, participating in various protests organized by ACT UP New York.

== Filmography and awards ==
=== Accolades ===
Ramírez won the Tony Award for Best Performance by a Featured Actress in a Musical and the Outer Critics Circle Award for Outstanding Featured Actress in a Musical for their performance as Lady of the Lake in the 2005 Broadway musical Spamalot. They gained widespread acclaim for their portrayal of Dr. Callie Torres in ABC's medical drama Grey's Anatomy. They garnered nominations for the Best Actress at the NAACP Image Award, the ALMA Award, and won the Screen Actors Guild Award for Outstanding Performance by an Ensemble in a Drama Series.

== Discography ==
=== Extended plays ===
List of EPs, with selected chart positions
Title	EP details	Peak chart positions		
Title	EP details	US	US Indie	CAN
Sara Ramirez	Released: March 27, 2011; Label: Atrevida; Format: digital download	37	7	38

=== Singles ===
- "Silent Night" (2009)
- "Rollercoaster" (2015)

=== Charted songs ===
List of songs, with selected chart positions
Title	Year	Peak chart positions					Album
Title	Year	US	US Heat.	CAN	FRA	IRL	Album
"The Story"	2011	69	2	72	94	34	Sara Ramirez
"—" denotes items which were not released in that country or failed to chart.

=== Soundtracks ===
List of soundtracks, with selected chart positions
Title	Soundtrack details	Peak chart positions	
Title	Soundtrack details	US	US Indie
Monty Python's Spamalot (Original Broadway Cast Recording)	Released: May 3, 2005; Label: Decca Records; Format: Compact disc, digital download	69	—
Grey's Anatomy: The Music Event	Released: March 31, 2011; Label: ABC Studios; Format: digital download	24	5
"—" denotes items which were not released in that country or failed to chart.
