= The Firewatcher's Daughter =

2015 studio album by Brandi Carlile

Studio album by Brandi Carlile
- Released: March 3, 2015
- Recorded: Bear Creek (Woodinville, Washington)
- Genre: Americana; folk rock
- Length: 42:54
- Label: ATO
- Producer: Ryan Hadlock

Brandi Carlile chronology
Bear Creek (2012)	The Firewatcher's Daughter (2015)	By the Way, I Forgive You (2018)

Singles from The Firewatcher's Daughter
- 1. "The Eye" Released: December 15, 2014

The Firewatcher's Daughter is the fifth studio album by Brandi Carlile, released on March 3, 2015, on ATO Records. The lead single, "The Eye", was released in December 2014. It was nominated for a Grammy Award for Best Americana Album at the 2016 awards.

== Release and reception ==
Professional ratings
Aggregate scores
Source	Rating
Metacritic	76/100
Review scores
Source	Rating
AllMusic	4/5 stars
The Austin Chronicle	3/5 stars
Uncut	7/10
USA Today	3.5/4 stars
Vice	A−

In a preview of her new album before release, the Boston Globe wrote, "Whether The Firewatcher's Daughter continues the country-folk flirtation of 2012's Bear Creek, returns to the warm adult songcraft of The Story and Give Up the Ghost, or explores some other direction entirely, she's sure to bring emotional intelligence, thoughtful clarity, and, most importantly, the most arresting female voice in pop this side of Adele. I'm betting on her."

“We didn't make any demos. To me rock and roll isn't really a genre but more of recklessness or a risk," Carlile told NPR. "The more something gets ironed out and sure of itself, the less it begins to rock somehow. That is what I think rock and roll is ... and it's scary."

The preview track, "The Eye," for which a video was released before the album, is a front-porch acoustic. The review from NPR Music said, " 'The Eye' is exactly what it proclaims itself to be: a quiet breath in the midst of the album's glorious storm. Rooted in Carlile's love of both classic country and California pop, the song is the kind many other artists are going to want to cover. It will be hard to top the original, though; it so eloquently highlights the telepathic connection Carlile shares with her longtime bandmates. A favorite on recent tours, 'The Eye' is destined to become a centerpiece in Carlile's catalog."

The Current reviewing the album wrote, "I thought she leaned too adult-contemporary for my tastes. Boy, was I wrong! This might be her most rockin' album to date. The album starts like a house afire: Carlile totally nails the vocal on the gospel-influenced "Wherever Is Your Heart," and this one makes you realize just how good she is. When she sings, you're a believer. She'll have you singing along on the infectious "The Things I Regret". Maybe the biggest surprise on the album is "Mainstream Kid," which shows some grit! It's as badass as Carlile has ever sounded. If you had Brandi Carlile pegged as an adult-contemporary softie, you might try again. Brandi Carlile and the Hanseroth twins show that they aren't afraid to rock out. The Firewatcher's Daughter is a bold and welcome addition to her catalogue." USA Today wrote, "The Firewatcher's Daughter is an album with a big heart, one that responds with love, not fear."

Carlile got a nod in the Best Americana Album category for the 58th Annual Grammy Awards. It was her first nomination at the Grammys.

== Track listing ==
No.	Title	Writer(s)	Length
1.	"Wherever Is Your Heart"	Brandi Carlile, Tim Hanseroth	3:50
2.	"The Eye"	Carlile, Tim Hanseroth	3:35
3.	"The Things I Regret"	Carlile, Phil Hanseroth, Tim Hanseroth	3:26
4.	"Mainstream Kid"	Carlile, Tim Hanseroth	4:19
5.	"Beginning to Feel the Years"	Phil Hanseroth	3:08
6.	"Wilder (We're Chained)"	Tim Hanseroth	3:32
7.	"Blood Muscle Skin & Bone"	Phil Hanseroth	4:16
8.	"I Belong to You"	Carlile	4:30
9.	"Alibi"	Tim Hanseroth	3:00
10.	"The Stranger at My Door"	Carlile	3:42
11.	"Heroes and Songs"	Carlile	2:47
12.	"Murder in the City"	Scott Yancey Avett, Timothy Seth Avett	2:53

== Personnel ==
- Brandi Carlile - acoustic guitar, electric guitar, keyboards, organ, percussion, piano, electric piano, lead vocals, background vocals
- Catherine Carlile - background vocals
- Brian Griffin - drums, percussion
- Ryan Hadlock - handclapping, percussion, piano, stomping
- Phil Hanseroth - bass guitar, drums, electric guitar, handclapping, percussion, stomping, ukulele, background vocals
- Tim Hanseroth - bass guitar, electric guitar, handclapping, percussion, slide guitar, stomping, background vocals
- Josh Neumann - cello, strings
- Jay Kardong - pedal steel guitar
- Mike McCready - electric guitar
- Jerry Streeter - bell
- Martin Kvamme - art direction
- David McClister - photography

== Charts ==
Chart (2015)	Peak position
Swiss Albums (Schweizer Hitparade)	50
US Billboard 200	9
US Independent Albums (Billboard)	1
US Top Rock Albums (Billboard)	1
US Americana/Folk Albums (Billboard)	1
US Indie Store Album Sales (Billboard)	4
UK Independent Albums (OCC)	22
Scottish Albums (OCC)	77
