= Grey's Anatomy (soundtrack) =

Grey's Anatomy Original Soundtrack

Soundtrack album by various artists
- Released: Volume 1: September 27, 2005; Volume 2: September 12, 2006; Volume 3: September 11, 2007; Music from Grey's Anatomy: May 16, 2009; Grey's Anatomy: The Music Event: March 31, 2011; Volume 4: September 13, 2011
- Recorded: Various dates
- Genre: Indie, folk, electronic
- Label: Hollywood

The Grey's Anatomy Original Soundtrack is the soundtrack album series for the medical drama television series Grey's Anatomy, with four volumes released in the series. The albums with the exception of Volume 4 were released by Hollywood Records, while Volume 4 was released by Chop Shop Records and Atlantic Records. In addition, a box set featuring the first 3 volumes was released on the same day as the third volume.

Volume 2 was nominated for a Grammy Award for Best Compilation Soundtrack for Visual Media at the 49th Annual Grammy Awards, losing to Walk the Line.

== Volume 1 track listing ==
Release date: September 27, 2005

1. The Postal Service "Such Great Heights"
2. Róisín Murphy "Ruby Blue"
3. Maria Taylor "Song Beneath the Song"
4. Tegan and Sara "Where Does the Good Go?"
5. Mike Doughty "Looking at the World from the Bottom of a Well"
6. Get Set Go "Wait"
7. The Eames Era "Could be Anything"
8. Rilo Kiley "Portions for Foxes"
9. Joe Purdy "The City"
10. Medeski, Martin & Wood "End of the World Party"
11. Ben Lee "Catch My Disease" (live)
12. The Ditty Bops "There's a Girl"
13. The Radio "Whatever Gets You Through Today"
14. Inara George "Fools in Love"
15. Psapp "Cosy in the Rocket"

== Volume 2 track listing ==
Release date: September 12, 2006

1. The Fray "How to Save a Life"
2. Moonbabies "War on Sound"
3. Jim Noir "I Me You"
4. Ursula 1000 "Kaboom!"
5. Anya Marina "Miss Halfway"
6. Jamie Lidell "Multiply"
7. KT Tunstall "Universe & U" [acoustic extravaganza version]
8. Metric "Monster Hospital"
9. Gomez "How We Operate" [radio edit]
10. Kate Havnevik "Grace"
11. The Chalets "Sexy Mistake"
12. Gran Bel Fisher "Bound by Love"
13. Get Set Go "I Hate Everyone" [clean version]
14. Foy Vance "Homebird"
15. Snow Patrol "Chasing Cars" [acoustic version]

The iTunes version of the album also includes Sing-Sing's "Come, Sing Me a Song" as the sixteenth track.

== Volume 3 track listing ==
Release date: September 11, 2007

1. Peter, Bjorn & John "Young Folks"
2. The Bird and the Bee "Again & Again"
3. The Jealous Girlfriends "Something in the Water"
4. Feist "Sealion"
5. Bill Ricchini "A Cold Wind Will Blow Through Your Door"
6. Grace Potter & The Nocturnals "Falling Or Flying"
7. Koop "Come to Me"
8. Keisha White "Don't Mistake Me"
9. The Whitest Boy Alive "Fireworks"
10. Jesus Jackson "Running On Sunshine"
11. Robert Randolph & the Family Band "Ain't Nothing Wrong With That"
12. Paolo Nutini "Million Faces"
13. Mat Kearney "Breathe In, Breathe Out"
14. Gomez "Moon and Sun"
15. John Legend "Sun Comes Up"
16. Ingrid Michaelson "Keep Breathing"
17. Brandi Carlile "The Story"

== Volume 4 track listing ==
Release date: September 9, 2011

1. Lykke Li "Get Some"
2. Scars on 45 "Heart on Fire"
3. Katie Herzig "Way to the Future"
4. Peter, Bjorn & John "Second Chance"
5. Cee Lo Green "Old Fashioned"
6. The National "England"
7. Graffiti6 "Stare Into the Sun"
8. Lissie "Worried About"
9. Delta Spirit "Salt in the Wound"
10. Correatown "Further"
11. The Republic Tigers "The Infidel"
12. The Quiet Kind "In Front of You"
13. Tim Myers "Entwined"
14. The Boxer Rebellion "Both Sides Are Even"

== Grey's Anatomy: The Music Event ==
Release date: March 31, 2011

Soundtrack for the season 7 episode "Song Beneath the Song"

1. "Chasing Cars" - Sara Ramirez, Kevin McKidd, Chandra Wilson
2. "Breathe" - Chyler Leigh
3. "How We Operate" - Kevin McKidd
4. "Wait" - Chandra Wilson, Sarah Drew, Chyler Leigh
5. "Runnin' on Sunshine" - Sara Ramirez, Daniel Sunjata, Kevin McKidd, Scott Foley, Justin Chambers, Chandra Wilson, Jessica Capshaw, Kim Raver, Chyler Leigh, Ellen Pompeo
6. "Universe & U" - Sara Ramirez, Jessica Capshaw
7. "Grace" - Sara Ramirez, Sarah Drew, Chyler Leigh
8. "How to Save a Life" - Kevin McKidd, Ellen Pompeo, Kim Raver, Eric Dane, Jessica Capshaw, Chandra Wilson, Chyler Leigh, Sarah Drew, Justin Chambers, Sara Ramirez
9. "The Story" - Sara Ramirez
