= Cover Stories =

Compilation album by various artists
- Released: May 5, 2017
- Recorded: 2011–2016
- Genres: Americana, country, rock
- Length: 46:00
- Label: Legacy
- Producers: Brandi Carlile; Tim Hanseroth; Phil Hanseroth

Singles from Cover Stories
- 1. "The Story" Released: February 21, 2017

Cover Stories is a charity tribute album in which various artists cover songs from Brandi Carlile's 2007 studio album, The Story. Benefits from the album, which was released on May 5, 2017, will benefit the organization War Child UK.

== Background and development ==
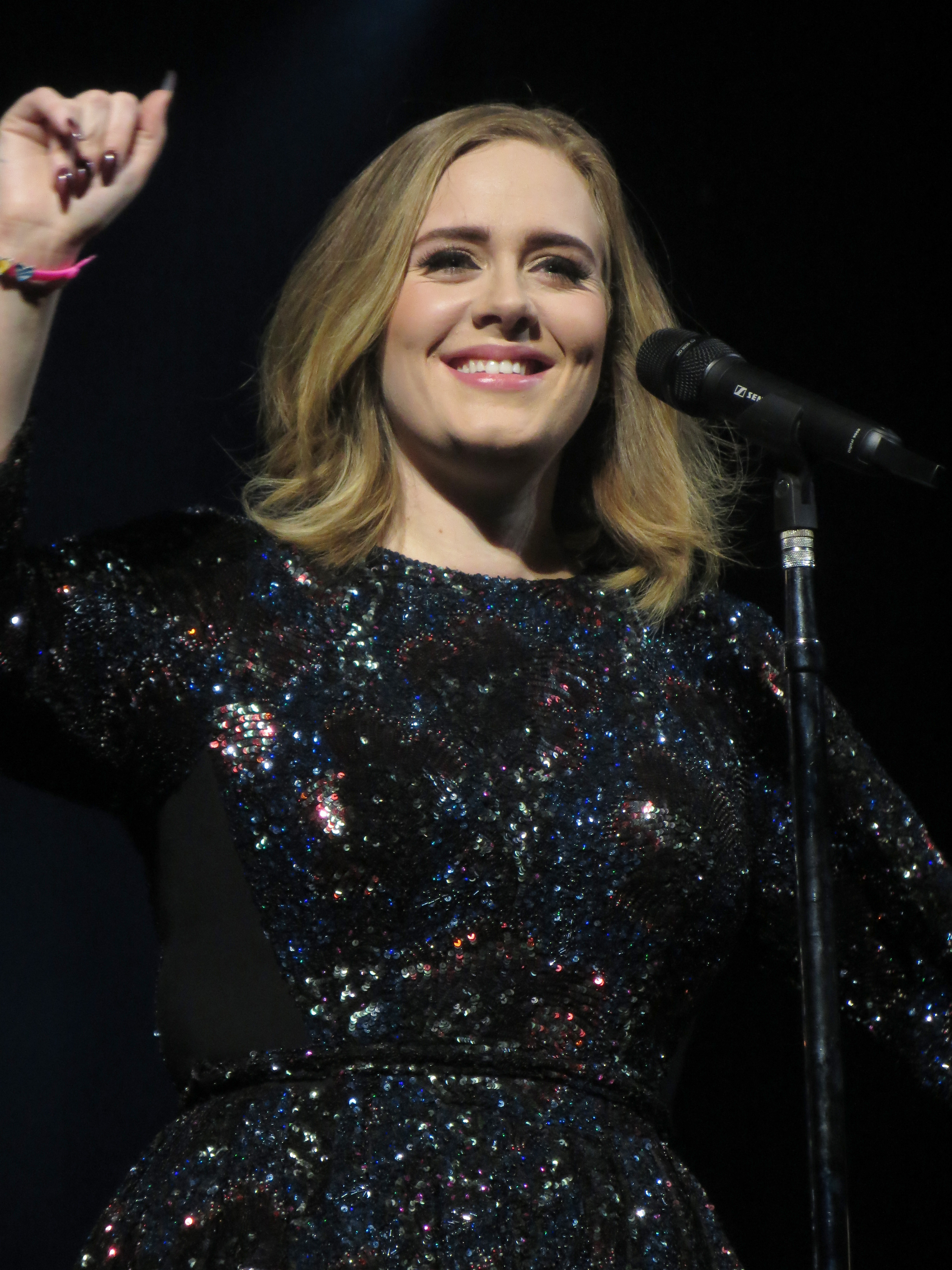
Adele's (pictured) cover of "Hiding My Heart" was the inspiration for Cover Stories.

Brandi Carlile's album The Story was released in 2007. In 2011, Adele released a cover version of the song "Hiding My Heart" as a bonus track on her 2011 album 21. This recording served as the "original inspiration" of Cover Stories. Carlile said of the project:

This is a David and Goliath story. Since becoming a mother, the reality of a child's beautiful life being torn apart by war felt like too big of a problem for me. So I asked my heroes and friends to help me launch a rock at the giant that is our refugee crisis and help in the only way we know how: through the power of music... This album defined our band and welded the Twins and me to one another forever. It’s been a transformative experience to revisit it 10 years later and watch it become something bigger than me. To hear the songs through the voices of my heroes is both surreal and humbling.

Barack Obama wrote a foreword for the album. He said, "As an artist, Brandi Carlile is using her talent on behalf of the most vulnerable among us, children living in areas of conflict. She reminds us that, together, we can build for our children a more just, peaceful world."

== Composition ==
The compilation album features fourteen songs performed by various artists. All of the tracks were recorded in 2016, except "Hiding My Heart" and Ruby Amanfu's cover of "Shadow on the Wall", which was produced by Patrick Carney and released in 2015.

The album opens with Shovels & Rope performing "Late Morning Lullaby", followed by Dolly Parton's version of "The Story". Kris Kristofferson's rendition of "Turpentine" features Chris Stapleton on guitar. The album continues with "My Song" by Old Crow Medicine Show, Jim James' "Wasted", and The Avett Brothers performing "Have You Ever". Anderson East's cover of "Josephine" features backing vocals by Miranda Lambert. The next tracks are "Losing Heart" by The Secret Sisters, the Indigo Girls performing "Cannonball", and "Until I Die" by Torres. Following are "Downpour", performed by Margo Price, "Shadow on the Wall", and "Again Today" by Pearl Jam. The album closes with "Hiding My Heart".

== Promotion ==
Preceding the album's release, Carlile and her band "the Twins" will begin a nine-stop concert tour in April 2017, during which they will perform The Story in its entirety.

== Reception ==
Rolling Stone's Daniel Kreps called Parton's rendition of "The Story" "tender" and "powerful".

Paste's Review Of The Day said "Not since Aaron Dessner joined forces with The Red Hot Organization and released Dark Was The Night, in 2009, has a charity record been as relevant and crafted as Brandi Carlile’s latest project", and called the album "a welcome reminder, not only of the timelessness of the original record, but the unique artistry of the cover itself as well".

NPR's Ann Powers called Kristofferson's cover of "Turpentine" "A full-daylight squint at heartbreak".

== Track listing ==
All tracks are written by Brandi Carlile, except where noted.

No.	Title	Performer(s)	Length
1.	"Late Morning Lullaby"	Shovels & Rope	3:50
2.	"The Story" (Phil Hanseroth)	Dolly Parton	4:17
3.	"Turpentine"	Kris Kristofferson	3:06
4.	"My Song"	Old Crow Medicine Show	2:49
5.	"Wasted"	Jim James	1:55
6.	"Have You Ever" (P. Hanseroth)	The Avett Brothers	3:16
7.	"Josephine" (Carlile, Tim Hanseroth)	Anderson East	3:42
8.	"Losing Heart" (Carlile, T. Hanseroth, P. Hanseroth)	The Secret Sisters	3:41
9.	"Cannonball"	Indigo Girls	3:47
10.	"Until I Die"	Torres	3:20
11.	"Downpour"	Margo Price	2:34
12.	"Shadow on the Wall" (Carlile, T. Hanseroth)	Ruby Amanfu	3:34
13.	"Again Today"	Pearl Jam	2:44
14.	"Hiding My Heart" (T. Hanseroth)	Adele	3:25
Total length:			46:00
