= That Wasn't Me =

Single by Brandi Carlile

Single by Brandi Carlile

from the album Bear Creek
- Released: April 3, 2012
- Recorded: 2011
- Genre: folk rock
- Length: 3:42
- Label: Columbia
- Songwriter: Brandi Carlile
- Producer: Trina Shoemaker

Brandi Carlile singles chronology
| "Can't Help Falling in Love" (2011) | "That Wasn't Me" (2012) | "Keep Your Heart Young" (2012) |

"That Wasn't Me" is a song by American recording artist Brandi Carlile. The song serves as the lead single off Carlile's fourth studio album, Bear Creek. It was recorded by Tanya Tucker for her 2023 album Sweet Western Sound, which was co-produced by Carlile.

== Background ==
The song's lyrics were inspired by the addiction and recovery of one of Carlile's friends while the style was influenced by Elton John, The Beatles and Sheryl Crow. The song is written from the viewpoint of the addict, and addresses the healing process and reconciliation that comes with overcoming addiction.

On March 19, 2012, "That Wasn't Me" was announced along with Carlile's fourth studio album via her official website. The announcement stated that the single would be sent to radios soon. On March 26, via social networking site Twitter, Carlile "tweeted" the single cover and announced that the single would be released online on April 3.

The single's music video features Kris Kristofferson portraying the role of the addict.

== Chart performance ==
| Chart (2012) | Peak position |
|---|---|
| US Rock Songs (Billboard) | 50 |
| US Triple A (Billboard) | 7 |
