= By the Way, I Forgive You =

Studio album by Brandi Carlile
- Released: February 16, 2018
- Studios: RCA Studio A (Nashville, Tennessee)
- Genres: Americana; symphonic pop; rock
- Length: 43:25
- Labels: Low Country Sound; Elektra
- Producers: Dave Cobb; Shooter Jennings

Brandi Carlile chronology
The Firewatcher's Daughter (2015)	By the Way, I Forgive You (2018)	In These Silent Days (2021)

Singles from By the Way, I Forgive You
- 1. "The Joke" Released: November 13, 2017; 2. "Party of One" Released: October 17, 2018

By the Way, I Forgive You is the sixth studio album by Brandi Carlile, released on February 16, 2018. "The Joke" was released as the album's lead single. The album was co-produced by Dave Cobb and Shooter Jennings. The album art is an original painting by Scott Avett. The album won a Grammy Award for Best Americana Album in 2019, as well being nominated for Album of the Year.

== Promotion ==
=== Singles ===
The album's lead single, "The Joke", was released on November 13, 2017. Of the track, Carlile said, "There are so many people feeling misrepresented [today]...so many people feeling unloved. Boys feeling marginalized and forced into these kind of awkward shapes of masculinity that they do or don't belong in... so many men and boys are trans or disabled or shy. Little girls who got so excited for the last election, and are dealing with the fallout. The song is just for people that feel under-represented, unloved or illegal." The official music video for the track was released on February 16, 2018, the same day By the Way, I Forgive You dropped. Former U.S. President Barack Obama named the track as one of his favorites of 2017. "The Joke" later reached number 4 on the Adult Alternative Songs chart and 43 on the Hot Rock Songs chart.

A remix of "Party of One" featuring English singer-songwriter Sam Smith was released as the second single on October 17, 2018. Upon release, it was announced that a portion of the profits from the song would benefit Children In Conflict, a non-profit that aids children affected by war. The song reached number 29 on the Adult Contemporary radio chart. A music video of the album version starring Elisabeth Moss was released in December 2018.

=== Television and radio performances ===
Carlile appeared on television multiple times to promote the album and its singles. In January 2018, Carlile performed "The Joke" on Jimmy Kimmel Live!. In April, she performed "The Joke" and "Whatever You Do" on The Late Show with Stephen Colbert and "The Joke" on The Howard Stern Show. In August, she performed "Hold Out Your Hand" on Full Frontal with Samantha Bee.

== Composition ==
"The Mother" commemorates Carlile's daughter. The song "Fulton County Jane Doe" is based on the real-life story of an unidentified murder victim in Fulton County, Georgia.

== Critical reception ==
Professional ratings
Aggregate scores
Source	Rating
AnyDecentMusic?	7.5/10
Metacritic	81/100
Review scores
Source	Rating
AllMusic	4/5 stars
The Austin Chronicle	4/5 stars
The A.V. Club	A−
Financial Times	4/5 stars
Paste	8.9/10
Pitchfork	6.9/10
Rolling Stone	4/5 stars
Slant Magazine	4/5 stars
Uncut	6/10
Vice (Expert Witness)	(2-star Honorable Mention)

By the Way, I Forgive You received positive reviews from music critics. At Metacritic, which assigns a normalized rating out of 100 to reviews from mainstream critics, the album has an average score of 81 out of 100, which indicates "Universal acclaim" based on ten reviews.

Rolling Stone referred to "Party of One" as a "delicate masterpiece". Rolling Stone also rated the entire album as the 12th best of 2018 on its list of the 50 best albums of 2018.

NPR rated the album as the 19th best of 2018. Thrillist rated the album as the 36th best of 2018. Vice rated it as the 22nd best album of 2018. PopMatters rated it as the 63rd best album of the year. Refinery29 rated it as the 9th best album. Entertainment Weekly rated By the Way, I Forgive You as the 11th best album of 2018. Chris Willman of Variety rated the album as the 2nd best of 2018. Kevin Coffey of the Omaha World-Herald also rated it as the 2nd best of the year.

=== Accolades ===
Year	Association	Category	Nominated work	Result
2018	Americana Music Honors & Awards	Artist of the Year	Brandi Carlile	Nominated
2018	Americana Music Honors & Awards	Song of the Year	"The Joke"	Nominated
2018	Americana Music Honors & Awards	Album of the Year	By the Way, I Forgive You	Nominated
2018	UK Americana Awards	International Album of the Year	By the Way, I Forgive You	Nominated
2018	UK Americana Awards	International Song of the Year	"The Joke"	Won
2019	Grammy Awards	Album of the Year	By the Way, I Forgive You	Nominated
2019	Grammy Awards	Best Americana Album	By the Way, I Forgive You	Won
2019	Grammy Awards	Record of the Year	"The Joke"	Nominated
2019	Grammy Awards	Song of the Year	"The Joke"	Nominated
2019	Grammy Awards	Best American Roots Song	"The Joke"	Won
2019	Grammy Awards	Best American Roots Performance	"The Joke"	Won

== Track listing ==
All tracks are written by Brandi Carlile, Phil Hanseroth and Tim Hanseroth except "The Joke", written by Carlile, Dave Cobb, Phil Hanseroth and Tim Hanseroth.

No.	Title	Length
1.	"Every Time I Hear That Song"	4:01
2.	"The Joke"	4:39
3.	"Hold Out Your Hand"	4:22
4.	"The Mother"	3:17
5.	"Whatever You Do"	4:07
6.	"Fulton County Jane Doe"	4:43
7.	"Sugartooth"	4:28
8.	"Most of All"	3:51
9.	"Harder to Forgive"	4:06
10.	"Party of One"	5:47
Total length:		43:25

== Personnel ==
- Brandi Carlile – lead vocals, guitar (tracks 3 through 7, 9), piano (2, 10)
- Tim Hanseroth – guitar (4, 5, 8, 9), electric guitar (2, 3, 6, 7), bass (1)
- Dave Cobb – guitar, high string guitar (4)
- Shooter Jennings – keyboards (1, 2, 5, 9), piano (1, 5, 6 through 9), organ (2, 6, 7), electric piano and synth (3)
- Phil Hanseroth – bass (2, 3, 4, 5, 7 through 10)
- Chris Powell – drums
- Alicia Enstrom – violin (2)
- David Angell – violin (2)
- Kristin Wilkinson – viola (2)
- Carole Rabinowitz – cello (2)
- Josh Neumann – cello (2, 8, 9)

Strings arranged by Paul Buckmaster (tracks 5, 10)

== Charts ==
=== Weekly charts ===
Chart (2018)	Peak position
Canadian Albums (Billboard)	27
Croatian International Albums (HDU)	21
Scottish Albums (Official Charts)	98
Swiss Albums (Schweizer Hitparade)	13
UK Americana Albums (Official Charts)	4
US Billboard 200	5
US Americana/Folk Albums (Billboard)	1
US Top Rock Albums (Billboard)	1

=== Year-end charts ===
Chart (2018)	Position
US Top Current Album Sales (Billboard)	127
US Top Rock Albums (Billboard)	84
