= Valerie Muzzolini Gordon =

Valerie Muzzolini Gordon (born in Nice, France) is the Principal Harpist of the Seattle Symphony. She lives in Seattle, Washington, with her daughter.

== Early life and education ==
Valerie Muzzolini Gordon was born in Nice, France, and began playing the harp at the age of seven. She began her study of music at the Conservatory of Nice and continued her studies at Curtis Institute of Music with Marilyn Costello and Judy Loman. She studied with Nancy Allen while doing graduate work at Yale University.

== Orchestra and ensembles ==
Gordon has been a member of the Seattle Symphony since 2000 and became Principal Harpist at the age of twenty-three. She is also a soloist and a guest principal harpist, and has performed with the Boston Symphony, Oregon Symphony, Orchestre Philharmonique de Radio France, Nice Philharmonic, Philadelphia Orchestra, Seattle Symphony, Mariinsky Theatre Orchestra, and the Vancouver Symphony. As a proponent of contemporary music and an active Chamber musician, she frequently performs with Music of Remembrance, Seattle Chamber Players. and the Seattle Chamber Music Society. Gordon premiered a double concerto for violin and harp at the 2012 New Hampshire Music Festival.

== Teaching ==
Gordon taught for several years at Cornish College of the Arts, and is now an Artist in Residence at the University of Washington. She taught at the Pacific Region International Summer Music Academy in June 2014, and will be returning for the 2015 program.
