= Give Up the Ghost (album) =

Studio album by Brandi Carlile
- Released: October 6, 2009
- Recorded: Sunset Sound, Los Angeles
- Genre: Folk rock
- Length: 39:45
- Label: Columbia
- Producer: Rick Rubin

Brandi Carlile chronology
| The Story (2007) | Give Up the Ghost (2009) | Bear Creek (2012) |

Singles from Give Up the Ghost
- 1. "Dreams" Released: August 18, 2009; 2. "That Year" Released: February 19, 2010

Professional ratings
Review scores
| Source | Rating |
|---|---|
| Allmusic | 4/5 stars |
| Billboard | (positive) |
| Express | (positive) |
| Paste | (90/100) |
| PopMatters | 7/10 stars |
| Slant Magazine | 3.5/5 stars |

Give Up the Ghost is the third studio album by American singer-songwriter Brandi Carlile, released on October 6, 2009, through Columbia Records. The album was produced by Grammy Award winner Rick Rubin and contains a collaboration with Elton John titled "Caroline". Recorded at Sunset Sound in Los Angeles, the album also features Chad Smith, Amy Ray and Benmont Tench.

"Dreams", the first single from the album, was released on Carlile's website on August 14, and was available for download on August 18.

== Track listing ==
All songs written by Carlile, unless noted otherwise.

1. "Looking Out" – 4:18
2. "Dying Day" (Tim Hanseroth) – 3:33
3. "Pride and Joy" – 4:20
4. "Dreams" (Carlile, Phil Hanseroth, Tim Hanseroth) – 3:31
5. "That Year" – 3:35
6. "Caroline" (Carlile, Phil Hanseroth, Tim Hanseroth) – 3:36
7. "Before It Breaks" (Carlile, Phil Hanseroth, Tim Hanseroth) – 3:57
8. "I Will" – 4:09
9. "If There Was No You" (Carlile, Phil Hanseroth) – 2:39
10. "Touching the Ground" (Tim Hanseroth) – 3:17
11. "Oh Dear" (Carlile, Phil Hanseroth) – 2:50

== Personnel ==
- Brandi Carlile – banjo, acoustic guitar, electric guitar, piano, lead vocals, background vocals
- Jesse Carmichael – mellotron
- Lenny Castro – percussion
- Gibb Droll – dobro, slide guitar
- Phil Hanseroth – bass guitar, upright bass, electric guitar, percussion, ukulele, background vocals, Wurlitzer
- Tim Hanseroth – drums, electric guitar, percussion, background vocals
- Jacob Hoffman – piano
- Victor Indrizzo – drums, percussion
- Elton John – piano, background vocals
- Paul Buckmaster – arrangements
- Josh Neumann – cello
- Jason Lader – synthesizer
- Amy Ray – background vocals
- Chad Smith – drums, percussion
- Benmont Tench – organ, piano

== Charts ==
| Chart (2009) | Peak position |
|---|---|
| US Billboard 200 | 26 |
| US Top Rock Albums (Billboard) | 9 |
| US Americana/Folk Albums (Billboard) | 5 |
| Swiss Albums (Schweizer Hitparade) | 33 |

== Awards ==
In 2010, Brandi Carlile was nominated for a GLAAD Media Award for "Outstanding Music Artist" for the album Give Up the Ghost during the 21st GLAAD Media Awards.
