= Brandi Carlile (album) =

Studio album by Brandi Carlile
- Released: July 12, 2005
- Recorded: 2005
- Genre: Folk rock
- Label: Columbia/Red Ink
- Producer: Brandi Carlile

Brandi Carlile chronology
Brandi Carlile (2005)	The Story (2007)

Professional ratings
Review scores
Source	Rating
Allmusic	link
JustPressPlay	(8.2/10) link

Brandi Carlile is the debut album from American folk rock singer Brandi Carlile. It was released on July 12, 2005 by Red Ink Records.

== Track listing ==
1. "Follow" (Brandi Carlile, Tim Hanseroth) – 4:13
2. "What Can I Say" (Tim Hanseroth) – 2:50
3. "Closer to You" (Carlile, Tim Hanseroth) – 2:54
4. "Throw It All Away" (Carlile, Tim Hanseroth) – 3:43
5. "Happy" (Carlile) – 2:32
6. "Someday Never Comes" (Carlile, Tim Hanseroth) – 2:47
7. "Fall Apart Again" (Phil Hanseroth, Tim Hanseroth) – 3:37
8. "In My Own Eyes" (Carlile) – 3:31
9. "Gone" (Carlile, Phil Hanseroth, Tim Hanseroth) – 3:05
10. "Tragedy" (Carlile) – 3:45

The 2006 re-release by Columbia Records included re-recordings of "Throw It All Away" and "What Can I Say," a version of "Tragedy" featuring cellist Phillip Peterson, and a live cover version of Elton John's "60 Years On".

== Personnel ==
=== Musicians ===
- Brandi Carlile – Guitar, Vocals, Producer, Engineer
- Phil Hanseroth – Bass, Vocals (background)
- Tim Hanseroth – Guitar, Vocals (background), Engineer
- Phillip Peterson – Strings
- Mark Pickerel – Drums
- Glenn Slater – Keyboards
- Kevin Suggs – Pedal Steel

=== Other ===
- Robbie Adams – Tracking
- Michael Barber – Executive Producer
- Kip Beelman – Engineer
- Tim Devine – A&R
- Autumn DeWilde – Photography
- Martin Feveyear – Mixing
- John Goodmanson – Producer, Engineer, Mixer
- Aimee MacAuley – Art Direction
- Vlado Meller – Mastering
