= Sara Ramirez (EP) =

EP by Sara Ramirez
- Released: March 27, 2011
- Label: Atrevida

Sara Ramirez is the debut extended play (EP) by the Mexican-American recording artist and actor of the same name, released on March 27, 2011. Released to the iTunes Store through Atrevida Records, the EP features four songs, including a cover of "The Story" which was written by Phil Hanseroth and originally performed by Brandi Carlile on her 2007 album The Story and two songs co-written with Los Angeles writer-producer Rob Giles of the band The Rescues, who also produced the EP. For the week of April 16, 2011, Sara Ramirez debuted at number 37 on the Billboard 200, number nine on Billboard's Independent Albums chart, and number 38 on the Canadian Albums Chart. "The Story" debuted the same week at number 69 on the Billboard Hot 100, number 72 on the Canadian Hot 100, and number 34 on the Irish Singles Chart.

== Track listing ==
No.	Title	Writer(s)	Length
1.	"Break My Heart"	Sara Ramirez, Rob Giles	3:12
2.	"Waitin"	Ramirez, Giles	3:16
3.	"Eye to Eye"	Ramirez	3:23
4.	"The Story"	Phil Hanseroth	3:45

== Charts ==
Chart (2011)	Peak position
Canadian Albums Chart	38
US Billboard 200	37
US Billboard Independent Albums	7
