= The Story (Brandi Carlile album) =

Studio album by Brandi Carlile
- Released: April 3, 2007
- Recorded: August – September 2006
- Genre: Folk rock
- Length: 52:57
- Label: Columbia
- Producer: T Bone Burnett

Brandi Carlile chronology
Brandi Carlile (2005)	The Story (2007)	Give Up the Ghost (2009)

The Story is the second album by American singer-songwriter Brandi Carlile, and was released on April 3, 2007. The album peaked at number 41 in the Billboard 200 on May 5, 2007. The Story was produced by T Bone Burnett and recorded over eleven days on two-inch audio tape in The Warehouse Studios in Vancouver, British Columbia. The album also features the guitarists and songwriters Phil and Tim Hanseroth, drummer Matt Chamberlain, cellist Josh Neumann and backing vocals by the Indigo Girls on "Cannonball". The album was re-recorded as Cover Stories featuring various artists covering the songs such as Dolly Parton, Pearl Jam and Adele in aid of the charity War Child.

== Television exposure ==
"The Story" was used in an episode of Grey's Anatomy. A video was created, first airing on the season 3 recap episode, "Every Moment Counts". The video helped boost sales and downloads of the album increased. "The Story" was also used in television advertisements promoting the final season of the Travel Channel series Anthony Bourdain: No Reservations and the Australian drama series McLeod's Daughters.

On 25 April 2008 Carlile performed "The Story" and "Turpentine" on the BBC2 show Later...with Jools Holland. The song "The Story" was also used in the 2008 commercial for Super Bock, one of the most popular beer brands in Portugal, which led to the album The Story reaching number 4 on the Portuguese album chart. The song was used in a General Motors television commercial aired on American and Canadian television showcasing their new line-up of more fuel efficient cars. Due to the ad airing heavily during the 2008 Beijing Olympics, the song increased in downloads. "The Story" was used in a montage of Penn State football coach Joe Paterno during the opening and closing of the Ohio State-Penn State football game on ABC on October 25, 2008.

The song was also used in:

- a Tracker television commercial that aired on South African television.
- the film The Lucky One (2012)
- an episode of A Million Little Things at the end of season 2 episode 1
- the Season 3 premiere of HBO TV series Hacks

== Track listing ==
1. "Late Morning Lullaby" (Brandi Carlile) - 3:27
2. "The Story" (Phil Hanseroth) - 3:58
3. "Turpentine" (Carlile) - 2:58
4. "My Song" (Carlile) - 4:28
5. "Wasted" (Carlile) - 3:47
6. "Have You Ever" (Phil Hanseroth) - 2:32
7. "Josephine" (Carlile, Tim Hanseroth) - 3:02
8. "Losing Heart" (Carlile, Tim Hanseroth, Phil Hanseroth) - 3:35
9. "Cannonball" (Carlile) - 3:52
10. "Until I Die" (Carlile) - 4:06
11. "Downpour" (Carlile) - 3:14
12. "Shadow on the Wall" (Carlile, Tim Hanseroth) - 3:15
13. "Again Today" (Carlile) - 10:38
  - Contains a hidden track, "Hiding My Heart" (Tim Hanseroth)

== Personnel ==
- Brandi Carlile - guitar, lead vocals, background vocals
- Matt Chamberlain - drums
- Keith Ciancia - keyboards
- Phil Hanseroth - bass guitar, background vocals
- Tim Hanseroth - guitar, background vocals
- Josh Neumann - cello
- Dave Palmer - keyboards
- Amy Ray - background vocals
- Emily Saliers - background vocals

== Commercial performance and reception ==
Professional ratings
Review scores
Source	Rating
AllMusic	4/5 stars
JustPressPlay	8.8/10

In response to the increase in album downloads caused by the adverts in the U.S. (mentioned above), the album saw a 368% increase in sales from 1,323 to 6,198, causing it to return to the Billboard 200 at #88. To date the album has currently sold 257,776 copies in the United States. The lead single, "The Story," saw an increase in downloads of 28,091 digital copies, causing it to the chart at #48 on the Billboard Hot Digital songs chart.

== Charts ==
Chart performance for The Story
Chart (2007)	Peak position
Australian Albums (ARIA Charts)	55
US Billboard 200	41
US Top Rock Albums (Billboard)	10
US Indie Store Album Sales (Billboard)	15
Scottish Albums (Official Charts)	71
Swiss Albums (Schweizer Hitparade)	18
Swedish Albums (Sverigetopplistan)	33
Norwegian Albums (VG-lista)	7
Portuguese Albums (AFP)	4
UK Albums (Official Charts)	58

Chart (2008)	Peak position
Portuguese 30 albums	4

== Certifications ==
Region	Certification	Certified units/sales
United States (RIAA)	Gold	500,000^{‡}
^{‡} Sales+streaming figures based on certification alone.

== Covers ==
- American Idol season 9 finalist Lacey Brown performed "The Story" during the top 16 week, receiving praises from the judges. Her cover was released as an American Idol live performance single on the iTunes Store and was available for purchase during the show's run.
- English singer Adele covered Carlile's hidden track "Hiding My Heart" as a bonus track for the limited edition of her 2011 album 21, which was then used on the soundtrack of the 2010 South Korean film Secret Love.
- Actor and singer Sara Ramirez covered "The Story" on their 2011 album Sara Ramirez EP. This cover was used on the Grey's Anatomy episode "Song Beneath the Song" during the seventh season.
- The singer/songwriter known as Cranius covered "The Story" in 2009. Cranius is known best for his World of Warcraft-based machinima songs, most popular of which is "Big Blue Dress".
- "The Story" was covered by country singer LeAnn Rimes and was released as the first single from her 2016 album Remnants.
