= The Story (Brandi Carlile song) =

2007 single by Brandi Carlile

Single by Brandi Carlile

from the album The Story
- Released: 2007
- Recorded: Vancouver
- Genre: Folk rock
- Label: Columbia
- Songwriter: Phil Hanseroth
- Producer: T-Bone Burnett

Brandi Carlile singles chronology
"What Can I Say" (2006)	"The Story" (2007)	"Turpentine" (2007)

"The Story" is a song released as a single by American folk rock singer Brandi Carlile, written by Phil Hanseroth, from her 2007 album The Story. It’s one of Carlile's best-known songs and has been included in the setlist of all of her concert tours to date.

The song was featured in Grey's Anatomy on April 12, 2007 and is on Grey's Anatomy Soundtrack album 3 (released September 11, 2007). It received renewed attention when a cover version was recorded by Grey's Anatomy actor Sara Ramirez and included in the 2011 musical episode "Song Beneath the Song". The track was later covered by LeAnn Rimes for her Remnants album, and by Dolly Parton for the charity tribute album Cover Stories.

== Composition and recording ==
Twin brothers Phil and Tim Hanseroth have been Carlile's performing and writing partners since 2004 and "The Story" was written by Phil Hanseroth before the Hanseroths began collaborating with Carlile. It has a 16-bar melody. It was recorded in Vancouver, British Columbia, Canada and produced by T-Bone Burnett. "The Story" was recorded "live to tape" with all the performers playing and singing at the same time, rather than following the usual practice of having musicians record their parts separately then combining them into a master recording.

== Release and promotion ==
"The Story" was released as a single in 2007. It was iTunes' Download of the Week in March 2007. Carlile has performed the song live on The Tonight Show with Jay Leno, Late Night with Conan O'Brien and The Early Show.

== Chart performance and reception ==
In the United States Brandi Carlile's "The Story" reached No. 75 on the Billboard Hot 100 chart, as well as No. 35 on the Adult Pop Songs chart and No. 48 on the Digital Songs chart. The song peaked at No. 44 on the Australian ARIA Singles Chart, No. 3 on the Norwegian VG-lista chart, No. 16 on the Swiss singles chart and No. 38 on the Ö3 Austria Top 40 chart.

Tom Scanlon of The Seattle Times describes a live performance of "The Story" as "stunning" and "spine-chilling". He notes the transition within the song between acoustic pop-rock and "scream-singing" that resembles Janis Joplin. A writer for Indianapolis Monthly also draws a comparison between Carlile's vocals and those of Joplin. Billboard and American Songwriter ranked the song number two and number four, respectively, on their lists of the 10 greatest Brandi Carlile songs.

Brandi Carlile version

Chart (2007–2008)	Peak position
Australia (ARIA)	44
Austria (Ö3 Austria Top 40)	38
Norway (VG-lista)	3
Portugal (Billboard)	1
Switzerland (Schweizer Hitparade)	16
US Billboard Hot 100	75
US Adult Pop Songs (Billboard)	35

Sara Ramirez version

List of songs, with selected chart positions
Song	Year	Peak chart positions						Album
Song	Year	US	US Heat	AUT	CAN	FRA	IRL	Album
"The Story"	2011	69	2	(Note: "The Story" did not enter the Austrian chart (Ö3 Austria Top 40), but peaked at No. 7 on the Austria Digital Songs chart.)	72	94	34	Sara Ramirez

== LeAnn Rimes version ==
"The Story"

Single by LeAnn Rimes

from the album Remnants
- Released: June 24, 2016
- Genre: Pop rock; country pop
- Length: 3:24
- Label: RCA
- Songwriter: Phil Hanseroth
- Producers: LeAnn Rimes; Darrell Brown; Mark Batson

LeAnn Rimes singles chronology
"Celebrate Me Home" (2015)	"The Story" (2016)	"How to Kiss a Boy" (2016)

Music video
- "The Story" on YouTube

Country music artist LeAnn Rimes released a cover version of the song on June 24, 2016 in the UK as the first single from her thirteenth studio album Remnants and her first release after signing with RCA UK. Rimes promoted the track with live performances on BBC One's The One Show and at London nightclub Heaven, but the track failed to enter any commercial charts in the UK. Rimes also sang this song on the Season 4 finale of The Masked Singer.

Rimes has indicated that she feels a strong connection with the track. In an interview with Billboard, she said "I fully embrace the journey I am on and have a deeper understanding of how every piece of my story serves a purpose in my evolution as a woman and an artist. This song is not only a love song but a song of self-acceptance and appreciation for life."

A music video directed by Isaac Rentz premiered on Rimes' Vevo channel on August 9, 2016. A remix by Rare Candy and a remix by Rich B and Phillip Marriot were also released.

== Dolly Parton version ==
"The Story"

Single by Dolly Parton

from the album Cover Stories
- Released: February 21, 2017
- Recorded: 2016
- Genre: Rock
- Length: 4:17
- Label: Legacy
- Songwriter: Phil Hanseroth
- Producer: Brandi Carlile

Dolly Parton singles chronology
"Head Over High Heels" (2016)	"The Story" (2017)	"Here I Am" (2018)

Music video
- "The Story" on YouTube

The song was covered by American singer-songwriter Dolly Parton for the 2017 compilation album Cover Stories. It was released as the first single from the album on February 21, 2017.

=== Background ===
When Carlile began planning to record a cover of her 2007 album, The Story, she said that her idol, Parton, was the only person she had in mind to record the title track. When Carlile wrote Parton asking her to record the track, she suggested Parton could drop the key to make it easier to sing. She later recalled the letter, saying it was "about the stupidest thing I think I’ve ever put down in writing." Parton enthusically accepted the offer to record the song and in her hand-written response she told Carlile, "Honey, do me a favor. Don’t drop the key. I think I can handle it." Upon hearing the completed recording, Carlile realized she had been one-upped, saying, "Every gratuitous and show-offy note that I hit in that song, Dolly hits it initially and then takes it higher. She just completely takes me to school."

=== Music video ===
The music video for the song was released on May 9, 2017.

== In other media ==
In 2011, "The Story" was again featured in an episode of Grey's Anatomy. The series 7 episode "Song Beneath the Song" was a special musical episode that included renditions of popular songs performed by the show's characters. In the episode Sara Ramirez, in the role of Callie Torres, sings "The Story". Ramirez's version of the song was included as a track on their 2011 extended play, Sara Ramirez and the 2011 album Grey's Anatomy: The Music Event. Ramirez's rendition was used again in 2018 for the season fourteen finale.

The song was also used in a General Motors commercial that aired during television coverage of the 2008 Summer Olympics. It was also featured in the opening episode of the third season of Hacks in 2024. "The Story" was also featured in the eighth episode of Disney's series Win or Lose.
