= Bear Creek (album) =

Studio album by Brandi Carlile
- Released: June 5, 2012
- Recorded: Bear Creek (Woodinville, Washington)
- Genre: Country folk; americana
- Length: 50:56
- Label: Columbia
- Producer: Trina Shoemaker; Brandi Carlile; Tim Hanseroth; Phil Hanseroth; Frank Liddell; Jay Joyce

Brandi Carlile chronology
Live at Benaroya Hall with the Seattle Symphony (2011)	Bear Creek (2012)	The Firewatcher's Daughter (2015)

Singles from Bear Creek
- 1. "That Wasn't Me" Released: April 3, 2012; 2. "Keep Your Heart Young" Released: November 5, 2012

Bear Creek is the fourth studio album by American singer-songwriter Brandi Carlile. The album was released June 5, 2012, through Columbia Records. The album was produced by Grammy Award winner Trina Shoemaker. The title of the album refers to the Bear Creek Studio at which the majority of the album was recorded.

== Singles ==
The first single from the album was "That Wasn't Me," which was released April 3, 2012. The song peaked at No. 5 on the US Triple A radio format.

The second single, "Keep Your Heart Young," was sent to Triple A radio stations on November 5, 2012. It peaked at No. 38 (December 7, 2012).

== Commercial performance ==
The album debuted at number ten on the US Billboard 200, making it her first ever top ten on the chart.

== Track listing ==
No.	Title	Writer(s)	Length
1.	"Hard Way Home"	Brandi Carlile, Phil Hanseroth, Tim Hanseroth	3:21
2.	"Raise Hell"	Brandi Carlile, Tim Hanseroth	4:08
3.	"Save Part of Yourself"	Brandi Carlile, Tim Hanseroth	3:22
4.	"That Wasn't Me"	Brandi Carlile	3:42
5.	"Keep Your Heart Young"	Phil Hanseroth, Tim Hanseroth	3:20
6.	"100"	Brandi Carlile, Phil Hanseroth	3:21
7.	"A Promise to Keep"	Tim Hanseroth	4:02
8.	"I'll Still Be There"	Brandi Carlile, Phil Hanseroth	3:26
9.	"What Did I Ever Come Here For"	Phil Hanseroth	3:40
10.	"Heart's Content"	Brandi Carlile	3:34
11.	"Rise Again"	Brandi Carlile, Phil Hanseroth, Tim Hanseroth	4:11
12.	"In the Morrow"	Brandi Carlile, Tim Hanseroth	4:02
13.	"Just Kids"	Brandi Carlile, Jared Faw	6:47
Total length:			50:56

iTunes Store pre-order bonus track
No.	Title	Length
14.	"Raise Hell (Live at Bear Creek)"

== Personnel ==
All credits here are listed as printed in the album booklet. Personnel are listed alphabetically with the primary artists listed separately.

- Brandi Carlile - vocals, guitar, piano, organ, handclaps, electric guitar, producer
- Phil Hanseroth - bass, vocals, handclaps, percussion, tambourine, piano, producer
- Tim Hanseroth - guitar, vocals, banjo, ukulele, handclaps, percussion, electric guitars, producer, additional recording
- Jeb Bows - mandolin, violin
- Matt Chamberlain - drums, handclaps, percussion
- Jon Ervie - additional recording
- Jared Faw - piano
- Frogs - Bear Creek frogs
- Jason Hall - engineer
- Michelle Holm - art direction
- Jay Joyce - mandolin, producer, engineer
- Frank Liddell - producer
- Allison Miller - drums, percussion, handclaps
- Josh Neumann - cello, tambourine
- Frank Ockenfels - photography
- Dave Palmer - piano
- Trina Shoemaker - producer, engineer, mixer
- Jerry Streeter - assistant engineer
- Matt Wheeler - assistant producer, engineer
- Mark Williams - A&R

== Charts ==
Chart (2012)	Peak position
US Billboard 200	10
US Top Rock Albums (Billboard)	3
US Americana/Folk Albums (Billboard)	1
US Digital Albums (Billboard)	4
US Indie Store Album Sales (Billboard)	2
Swiss Albums (Schweizer Hitparade)	39
