= These Things =

Single by She Wants Revenge

from the album She Wants Revenge
- Released: October 25, 2005
- Recorded: Autumn and Winter 2004 at Perfect Kiss Studios (Los Angeles)
- Genre: Dark wave; post-punk revival
- Length: 5:13 (album version); 3:17 (radio edit)
- Label: Geffen; Perfect Kiss
- Songwriters: Adam Bravin; Justin Warfield
- Producer: She Wants Revenge

She Wants Revenge singles chronology
"These Things" (2005)	"Tear You Apart" (2006)

Music video
- "These Things" on YouTube

"These Things" is a song by American rock band She Wants Revenge. It was released as their debut single and the lead single from their self-titled debut studio album on October 25, 2005. On Billboard's Alternative Songs chart, "These Things" peaked at number 22.

== Music videos ==
The band has produced two music videos for "These Things". One video splices screencaps of various beautiful, young women in seductive, orgasmic poses with snippets of Adam Bravin playing the piano and Justin Warfield singing. Another video features Shirley Manson, lead singer of the band Garbage, and starts off with Bravin and Warfield walking down a city street at night. Without warning, a third man attacks Warfield as he walks past the two of them but Bravin fends him off. A female bystander, played by Manson, comforts Warfield and helps him to his feet, and she and Bravin walk him to a car. The video ends with Warfield's attacker washing his hands in a bathroom and looking up as he notices Manson standing behind him.

== Track listing ==
1. "These Things [Radio Edit]" – 3:17
2. "Tear You Apart" – 4:45
3. "Spend the Night" – 4:22
4. "Black Liner Run" – 4:52

== Charts ==
Chart (2006)	Peak position
US Alternative Airplay (Billboard)	22
