= Electric Tones =

Independent record label

- Founded: 2001
- Founder: Tim Simenon
- Genre: Electronica
- Country of origin: Netherlands
- Location: Amsterdam
- Official website: www.electrictones.com

Electric Tones is an independent record label owned and run by British composer and producer Tim Simenon. The label, which is based in Amsterdam, was founded in 2000 and is dedicated to the release of electronic-based compositions, generally fitting into the field known as electronica.

Because of certain similarities between electronica's compositional, production and editing styles, and aspects of the more mainstream Dance music genre, the two worlds sometimes overlap. It is not uncommon for certain artists to move between the two scenes - as with label boss, Tim Simenon.

Simenon very occasionally releases his own compositions through the label, either under the alias of Bomb the Bass or as the more experimental Flow Creator.

== Opiate Sparks: Electric Tones Debuts ==
Electric Tones 1234 EP (2000).

The first Electric Tones release was a four-track compilation EP, entitled Electric Tones 1234 - with the name of the release reflecting how the collection included the first, second, third and fourth tracks released on the label. Issued in 2000, and taking the form of two 7-inch singles, the EP marked the recording debut of Opiate, a.k.a. Thomas Knak. Knak has since achieved a mainstream profile of sorts through his collaboration with Björk, on her hugely successful Vespertine album - for which Knak co-wrote and produced several tracks.

Also featured was a cut called Croissant by Club Off Chaos, which is an outfit led by Jaki Liebzeit, drummer with the band, Can. The EP was rounded off with the notable inclusion of several tracks by a hitherto unknown act, called Flow Creator. Upon reading the credits closely, this turned out to be another alter-ego for Tim Simenon.

== Regular Current: Compilations & New Names ==
Up until the end of 2007, Electric Tones had released two further EPs, more often than not collecting brand new acts together: Electric Tones 5678 and Electric Tones 9101112, both of which were issued in the 12-inch single format. Each release was limited to a run of 500 copies each, with the record sleeve - as is the case with limited edition releases - stamped with the individual copy number. In a press release from the period, Simenon was quoted as saying of the limited number release approach, "All the releases were limited editions to keep the hobby spirit alive."

Electric Tones 5678 is divided equally between Opiate, and Amsterdam-based musician, Ricardo Avocado - included together here, perhaps, because both acts were experimenting with aspects of Dub aesthetics. Electric Tones 9101112 features two tracks by Soul Circuit, which turned out to be an occasional alias for Adrian Corker and Paul Conboy, otherwise known as A.P.E. The remaining pair of compositions making up this EP included, an abstract contribution from Noriko, the recording name of Newcastle DJ, James Postlethwaite. And, playing the collection out was the reappearance of the Bomb The Bass name - for the first time in 9 years - courtesy of a Christian Kleine remix of Clear Cut featuring Lali Puna (the latter of which has since become a much sought after rarity).

All of these EP tracks would later be rounded up, and released in digital CD form under the collective title, Jukebox; in turn becoming the labels seventh release.

== Alternate Current: Non-compilation Releases ==
Slowfall EP by Wiseintime (2001).

As of 2008, in between its compilation work, Electric Tones has also released five records by five individual artists. First out was Blind by A.P.E. Issued on a 7-inch single, Blind is a futuristic blues song. Next came a 10-inch single built around two tracks, Slowfall and Meltdown, by an artist listed as Wiseintime. Again this release shone across another pseudonym by an already well-known name, with Wiseintime an alternative representation of Ian Simmonds, a.k.a. Juryman.

Ricardo Avacado also scored his recording debut through Electric Tones, with his 2002 release, The Bridge Ends EP. Limited to a numbered run of 300 copies, the 10-inch single ran at 33-rpm, with side-A dedicated to Checkpoint Fender, and Left of Legzira filling the flipside. Avacado's work continued to mine the possibilities of melding contemporary Electronica with the Dub aesthetic, illustrating a clear progression of his compositional manifesto from Electric Tones 5678.

The ninth release from the label would come courtesy of producer/programmer, Jono Podmore, otherwise known as Kumo. Kumo And Friends would feature three tracks, and spotlight the progressive compositional talents of the one-time child violinist and electronic music student, who at one time or another had previously worked with the likes of The Shamen, Robert Owens, Ian McCulloch and BJ Cole.

== Surge: New Electric Tones Material ==
In February 2008, came the announcement that Tim Simenon was reinstating Bomb The Bass to active mainstream duties, with the intended release of a new album, Future Chaos. With full release details still to come, and following his lengthy absence from the mainstream, Simenon continues to ramp up communication through the bands Myspace platform. However, it has still not been confirmed as to whether Future Chaos will be an Electric Tones release (no doubt becoming e-tones 010) supported by some kind of outside distribution deal.

As of March 2008, the track Butterfingers was featured along with a promotional video on the Bomb The Bass Myspace page - suggesting that the song will be a single release ahead of Future Chaos.

== Discography ==
e-tones 001 - Various Artists: Electric Tones 1234 (2x7-inch EP)
e-tones 002 - A.P.E.: Blind (7-inch single)
e-tones 003 - Bomb The Bass: Tracks (12-inch EP)
e-tones 004 - Various Artists: Electric Tones 5678 (12-inch EP)
e-tones 005 - Wiseintime: Slowfall (10-inch single)
e-tones 006 - Various Artists: Electric Tones 9101112 (12-inch EP)
e-tones 007 - Various Artists: Electric Tones Jukebox (album, CD)
e-tones 008 - Richard Avocado: The Bridge Ends (12-inch EP)
e-tones 009 - Kumo: Kumo And Friends (12-inch EP)
e-tones 010 - Bomb The Bass: Future Chaos (album)

== See also ==
- List of record labels
- Bomb The Bass
