= This Is Forever =

Studio album by She Wants Revenge
- Released: October 9, 2007
- Recorded: Winter to Summer 2007
- Genres: Post-punk revival, dark wave, gothic rock
- Length: 55:54
- Labels: Perfect Kiss; Flawless; Geffen
- Producer: She Wants Revenge

She Wants Revenge chronology
She Wants Revenge (2006)	This Is Forever (2007)	Valleyheart (2011)

Singles from This Is Forever
- 1. "True Romance" Released: 2007; 2. "Written in Blood" Released: 2007

Professional ratings
Aggregate scores
Source	Rating
Metacritic	47/100
Review scores
Source	Rating
AllMusic	3/5 stars
The A.V. Club	B
Blender	2/5 stars
Now	2/5 stars
PopMatters	4/10
Spin	1.5/5 stars
URB	0.5/5 stars

This Is Forever is the second full-length studio album by She Wants Revenge. It was released on October 9, 2007. The cover art replicates that of their debut, She Wants Revenge, but with a black-themed twist: the model is wearing black underwear and a funeral veil, while the back cover reveals she's holding a black rose behind her back instead of a kitchen knife.

== Track listing ==
1. "First, Love" – 1:52
2. "Written in Blood" – 5:00
3. "Walking Away" – 3:42
4. "True Romance" – 4:10
5. "What I Want" – 3:42
6. "It's Just Begun" – 4:06
7. "She Will Always Be a Broken Girl" – 5:22
8. "This Is the End" – 5:44
9. "Checking Out" – 5:35
10. "Pretend the World Has Ended" – 4:14
11. "Replacement" – 5:32
12. "All Those Moments" – 2:36
13. "Rachael" – 4:27
14. "...And A Song For Los Angeles" – 5:02 (Best Buy Bonus Track)
15. "What I Want" (SWR Remix) – 3:58 (Indie Record Store Bonus Track)

=== iTunes bonus track ===
14. "Love to Sleep" – 5:33

== Personnel ==
All credits for This Is Forever are adapted from the album's liner notes.

She Wants Revenge

- Justin Warfield – vocals, guitars, programming; production, recording
- "Adam 12" Bravin – bass, keyboards, percussion, programming, vocals; production, recording
- Thomas Froggatt – guitar
- Scott Ellis – drums

Technical personnel

- Michael Patterson – mixing
- Brian "Big Bass" Gardner – mastering
- Michael Muller – cover & band photography
- Todd Gallopo – package design
- Jeremy DiPaolo – package design
- Tomi Monstre – This Is Forever typeface
- Bree Delano – SWR cursive logo

== Exclusives ==
- Circuit City's Edition comes with a free poster.
- Best Buy's Version comes with a free ringtone for "True Romance," as well as an exclusive bonus track, "...And A Song For Los Angeles."
- iTunes US has a bonus track, "Love to Sleep," with purchase of the full album.
- Some independent record stores have a version with an SWR remix of "What I Want" as a bonus track on the cd as well as a free red vinyl 12-inch which features an instrumental version of "Written In Blood" (as well as the album version) and the dark instrumental track "These Two Words."

== Charts ==
Chart (2007)	Peak position
U.S. Billboard 200	58
