= Beat Dis – The Very Best of Bomb the Bass =

Beat Dis - The Very Best of Bomb the Bass

Compilation album by Bomb the Bass
- Released: 1999
- Label: BMG

Beat Dis – The Very Best of Bomb the Bass is a compilation album released in 1999 by Bomb the Bass on BMG Records

The album included singles and album tracks from Into the Dragon, the single "Winter in July" and the Bomb the Bass megamix which was previously available as a b-side to "Say a Little Prayer".

== Track listing ==
1. "Beat Dis" [12 Version] (Black, Pasquez) – 5:58
2. "Megablast" – 6:52
3. "Say a Little Prayer" – 5:28
4. "The Air You Breathe" – 6:53
5. "Don't Make Me Wait" – 4:19
6. "Liquid Metal" – 4:24
7. "Shake It" – 5:11
8. "Dynamite Days" – 1:46
9. "Run Baby Run" – 4:47
10. "On the Cut (2000 Ad)" – 3:53
11. "Hey You" – 3:24
12. "Switching Channels" – 4:48
13. "Dune Buggy Attack" – 4:49
14. "Winter in July" [Ubiquity Mix] – 7:13
15. "Megamix" – 2:57
