= Valleyheart (She Wants Revenge album) =

Studio album by She Wants Revenge
- Released: May 24, 2011
- Studio: Perfect Kiss Studios (Hollywood, CA)
- Genre: Alternative rock
- Length: 45:13
- Label: Five Seven Music
- Producers: Adam Bravin; Justin Warfield

She Wants Revenge chronology
This Is Forever (2007)	Valleyheart (2011)	The Loved (2027)

Singles from ValleyHeart
- 1. "Must Be the One" Released: 2011; 2. "Take the World" Released: 2011

Professional ratings
Review scores
Source	Rating
AllMusic	3/5 stars
IGN	7.5/10

Valleyheart is the third studio album by American alternative rock band She Wants Revenge. It was released on May 24, 2011 via Five Seven Music. Recording sessions took place at Perfect Kiss Studios in Hollywood. Production was handled by the band’s founding members Justin Warfield and Adam Bravin. The album is the final with the band's original lineup, as drummer Scott Ellis would amicably leave the group during the touring cycle. Bravin and guitarist Thomas Froggatt would also swap main instruments on subsequent releases: Bravin would swap from bass to guitar, and Froggatt would take over bass duties. In the United States, the album peaked at number 153 on the Billboard 200 chart.

== Track listing ==
All tracks are written by Justin Warfield and Adam Bravin.

No.	Title	Length
1.	"Take the World"	5:27
2.	"Kiss Me"	3:55
3.	"Up in Flames"	3:43
4.	"Must Be the One"	4:19
5.	"Not Just a Girl"	4:22
6.	"Reasons"	3:22
7.	"Little Stars"	4:28
8.	"Suck It Up"	6:15
9.	"Holiday Song"	3:52
10.	"Maybe She's Right"	5:30
Total length:		45:13

== Personnel ==
All personnel credits for Valleyheart are adapted from the album's liner notes.

- Justin Warfield – vocals, guitars, programming; production, recording, mixing
- Adam Bravin – bass, keyboards, sounds and tones; production; photography
- Thomas Froggatt – guitars (tracks 1–5, 8–10)
- Scott Ellis – drums

Additional musicians

- Stephanie King Warfield – background vocals (track 3)
- Bowie Warfield – background vocals (track 3)

Technical personnel

- Paul Logus – mixing
- Michael Patterson – mastering
- Michael Muller – band photography
- Todd Gallopo – design

== Charts ==
Chart (2011)	Peak position
US Billboard 200	153
