= She Wants Revenge =

American rock band

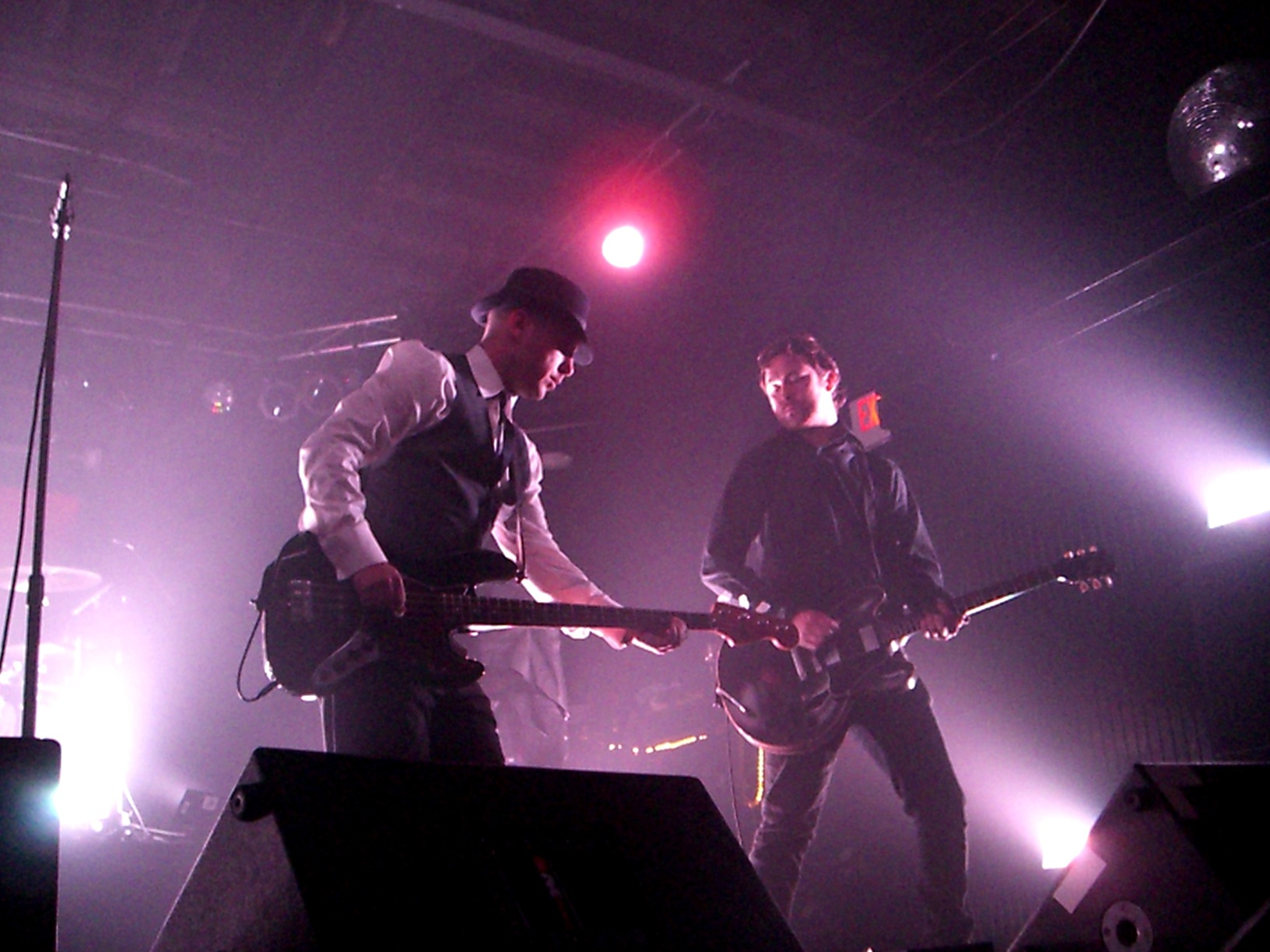
- She Wants Revenge live in 2006. From left to right: Adam Bravin, Justin Warfield (obscured), Thomas Froggatt

Background information
- Origin: Los Angeles, California, U.S.
- Genres: Post-punk revival; gothic rock; dance-rock
- Years active: 2004–2012; 2015–2020; 2022–present
- Labels: Perfect Kiss; Flawless; Geffen; Interscope; Universal; Five Seven
- Members: Justin Warfield; Adam Bravin; Thomas Froggatt
- Past members: Scott Ellis
- Website: shewantsrevenge.com

She Wants Revenge is an American rock band, based in San Fernando Valley, California. Formed in 2004, the band is led by the duo of singer and guitarist Justin Warfield and multi-instrumentalist Adam Bravin. Their music has been influenced by post-punk, darkwave and gothic rock. The band has sold more than 300,000 records in the US.

The group's debut album She Wants Revenge was released in early 2006 and included the singles "Tear You Apart" (the band's biggest hit, reaching No. 6 on Billboard's Alternative Songs chart), "These Things" and "Out of Control". The band also released the albums This Is Forever (2007) and Valleyheart (2011) before disbanding in 2012. She Wants Revenge has since reunited twice, in 2015 and in 2022. Their fourth album, The Loved, is scheduled for release in 2027.

== History ==
She Wants Revenge, a duo consisting of Justin Warfield and Adam Bravin, formed in 2004. Warfield was formerly a rapper whose 1991 single "Season of the Vic" reached No. 18 on Billboard's Hot Rap Singles chart and was featured on Bomb the Bass' song "Bug Powder Dust", a No. 24 hit in the UK. Bravin was a DJ under the name DJ Adam 12 and played for Crazy Town from 1995 to 1996.

The group were scouted and later signed by Limp Bizkit frontman Fred Durst to his label Flawless Records in April 2005.

The group's self-titled debut was released on January 31, 2006. Lead single "These Things" starred Garbage singer Shirley Manson in its music video, while Joaquin Phoenix directed the video for second single "Tear You Apart".

The band toured extensively through 2006 with Depeche Mode and Placebo.

In 2007, the group was featured on the track "Time" with Timbaland. In a 2017 interview, Adam Bravin told Suicide Girls that She Wants Revenge has a lot of unreleased potential b-sides, like "Love to Sleep", which they would like to share. Adam added that the band would like to tour with their heroes The Cure and Bauhaus and in 2011 they did tour with Peter Murphy, lead singer of Bauhaus, on his "Ninth" tour in the US. They were released from their contract with the label Geffen/Interscope, according to a MySpace bulletin. The group formed their own label, Perfect Kiss, formerly an imprint, in 2008.

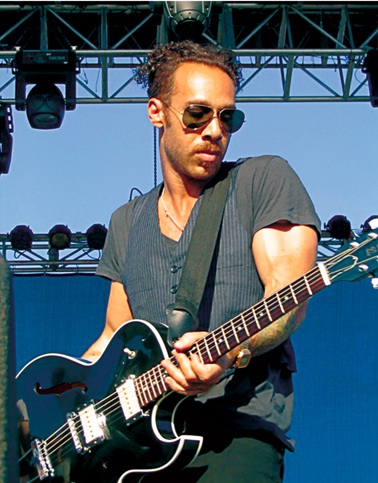
Justin Warfield of She Wants Revenge live in concert

Their EP, Save Your Soul, was released to iTunes on May 13, 2008. The EP contained four tracks: "Save Your Soul", "A Hundred Kisses", "Sugar", and "Sleep". The group has formed a fan club and participated in the 2008 Nylon summer tour. Their song "Tear You Apart" appeared in the first season of the TV show Fringe (episode 18, "Midnight"), in the movie The Number 23 starring Jim Carrey, and in the season 5 première of American Horror Story (episode 1, "Checking In").

An EP titled Up and Down, was released via iTunes on September 22, 2009. At the end of their tour to promote the release of Up and Down, She Wants Revenge began working on their third studio album, which would revisit the dark roots of their first album.

A new video titled "Take The World" was released February 7, 2011, prior to the release of their first single, "Must Be The One". The video was band member Adam Bravin's directorial debut. Filming for "Must Be The One" began on February 8, and was released in March. Valleyheart, the band's third studio album, was released on May 23, 2011.

On August 1, 2012, the band announced that they are taking an indefinite hiatus.

In 2015, She Wants Revenge gained popularity following "Tear You Apart" appearing in American Horror Story: Hotel's season premiere. The song choice was personally requested by Lady Gaga, who starred in the show. As a result, the band reunited, selling out its ten-year anniversary reunion shows.

On 22 February 2019, it was announced that She Wants Revenge would be appearing at Infest Festival, held at the University of Bradford Student Union, West Yorkshire, UK, over the August Bank Holiday Weekend.

In August 2020, the band announced that they were disbanding. In May 2022, the band announced that they are recording again and intend to begin touring in the near future. They announced a USA fall 2022 tour, supported by the Chameleons, and a European tour. In 2023, they announced the Eternal tour, announcing dates in Europe, UK, Australia, Hawaii and USA.

== Band members ==
Current members

- Justin Warfield – lead vocals, guitar, programming, keyboards (2004–2012; 2015–2020; 2022–present)
- Adam Bravin – bass, bass VI, keyboards, programming, backing vocals, guitar, percussion (2004–2012; 2015–2020; 2022–present)
- Thomas Froggatt – bass (2022–present); guitar (2005–2012, 2016–2020)

Current touring musicians

- Tony Bevilacqua – guitar (2025–present)
- Lia Braswell – drums (2025–present)

Former members

- Scott Ellis – drums, percussion (2005–2011, 2012, 2016–2020); tour manager (2005–2006); musical manager (2012)

Former touring musicians

- Jason Payne – drums (2012)
- Spencer Rollins – guitar (2022–2024)
- David Goodstein – drums (2022–2024)
- Elias Mallin – drums (2026; substitute for Lia Braswell)

== Discography ==
=== Studio albums ===
List of studio albums, with selected chart positions
Title	Album details	Peak chart positions					Certifications
Title	Album details	US	US Alt	US Dance	US Indie	US Rock	Certifications
She Wants Revenge	Released: January 31, 2006; Label: Perfect Kiss	38	—	3	—	9	RIAA: Gold
This Is Forever	Released: October 9, 2007; Label: Perfect Kiss	58	14	—	—	18	
Valleyheart	Released: May 24, 2011; Label: Five Seven Music	153	19	—	23	37	
The Loved	Released: February 12, 2027; Label: Perfect Kiss	To be released					
"—" denotes a recording that did not chart or was not released in that territory.

==== EPs ====
List of EPs, with selected chart positions
Title	Album details
These Things	Released: October 25, 2005; Label: Perfect Kiss
iTunes Session	Released: 2006; Label: Perfect Kiss
Save Your Soul	Released: October 4, 2008; Label: Perfect Kiss
Up and Down	Released: September 22, 2009; Label: Perfect Kiss

=== Singles ===
List of singles, with selected chart positions, showing year released and album name
Title	Year	Peak chart positions					Certifications	Album
Title	Year	US Bub.	US Alt	US Rock DL	SCO	UK	Certifications	Album
"These Things"	2005	—	22	—	—	—		She Wants Revenge
"Tear You Apart"	2006	22	6	8	81	158	RIAA: Platinum; BPI: Silver	She Wants Revenge
"Out of Control" / "Sister"	2006	—	—	—	—	—		She Wants Revenge
"True Romance"	2007	—	—	—	—	—		This Is Forever
"Written in Blood"	2007	—	—	—	—	—		This Is Forever
"Save Your Soul"	2008	— (Note: "Save Your Soul" did not enter the Billboard Hot 100, but peaked at number 17 on the Hot Singles Sales chart.)	—	—	—	—		Save Your Soul
"Must Be the One"	2011	—	—	—	—	—		Valleyheart
"Take the World"	2011	—	36	—	—	—		Valleyheart
"Kiss The Night Away"	2012	—	—	—	—	—		Non-album singles
"Never"	2016	—	—	—	—	—		Non-album singles
"Big Love"	2018	—	—	—	—	—		Non-album singles
"Black Wax/Our Love"	2026	—	—	—	—	—		The Loved
"—" denotes a recording that did not chart or was not released in that territory.

==== Compilations ====
- The Nightmare Before Christmas Soundtrack – (October 2006; contributed "Kidnap the Sandy Claws")
- Timbaland Presents: Shock Value – (April 3, 2007; contributed "Time")

== Videography ==
=== Music videos ===
Year	Song	Director
2005	"Sister"	Michael Muller, Petro Papahadjopoulos
2005	"These Things" (version 1)	Unknown
2006	"These Things" (version 2)	Sophie Muller
2006	"Tear You Apart"	Joaquin Phoenix
2007	"True Romance"	Joaquin Phoenix, Justin Warfield
2007	"Written in Blood"	Justin Warfield
2011	"Take the World"	Adam Bravin
2011	"Must Be the One"	Justin Warfield
2026	"Black Wax/Our Love"	Adam Bravin
