= Metamono =

Music group

== Biography ==
Metamono is a musical trio formed in 2010 by Jono Podmore, Mark Hill and Paul Conboy to create analogue electronic music without using digital sound generation and processing, overdubs or microphones.

Their improvised compositions are created using pre-used, borrowed and handbuilt vintage analogue synths and ring modulators, enhanced by the sounds of a theremin, a siren and a valve radio.

Much of Metamono's equipment has been built or adapted by Paul Conboy (Bomb the Bass).

In 2013 Metamono released the album With the Compliments of Nuclear Physics on vinyl.

Metamono also released a six-song cassette-only EP entitled Band Theory

== Discography ==
- C15H14O6: Limited Edition cassette 2010
- The Enemy Above: Limited Edition cassette 2010
- Band Theory EP: Limited Edition cassette 2010
- Bambino Lives: Limited Edition cassette 2010
- Tape EP: HoHum Records HOMUM017 2011
- Parcel Post EP: Instrumentarium Records 10" vinyl IMT001 2012
- Warszawa/Shafty: Instrumentarium Records 7" IMT003 2013
- With The Compliments of Nuclear Physics: Instrumentarium Records LP IMT004 2013
- The Acrobatic Fly: download only via Bandcamp 2015
- Bad Bird: download only via Bandcamp 2016
- Creative Listening Instrumentarium Records LP IMT005 2016
- Europe Endless: download only via Bandcamp 2016
