= She Wants Revenge (album) =

Studio album by She Wants Revenge
- Released: January 31, 2006
- Recorded: Autumn and Winter 2004
- Studios: Perfect Kiss (Los Angeles, CA)
- Genres: Post-punk revival; electronic rock; dark wave; gothic rock
- Length: 60:12
- Labels: Perfect Kiss; Geffen; Flawless
- Producer: She Wants Revenge

She Wants Revenge chronology
She Wants Revenge (2006)	This Is Forever (2007)

Singles from She Wants Revenge
- 1. "These Things" Released: October 25, 2005; 2. "Tear You Apart" Released: January 10, 2006; 3. "Sister"/"Out of Control" Released: August 15, 2006

She Wants Revenge is the debut studio album by American rock band She Wants Revenge. Mixed by Michael Patterson, it was released on January 31, 2006 by Perfect Kiss, a subsidiary of Geffen Records.

The album cover shows a female model wearing white underwear, while the back cover reveals that she's holding a very large knife behind her back (i.e. "she wants revenge").

== Critical reception ==
Professional ratings
Review scores
Source	Rating
AllMusic	3/5 stars
Pitchfork	5.9/10
Robert Christgau	(dud)
Rolling Stone	3/5 stars
Slant Magazine	2/5 stars
Sputnikmusic	2.0/5.0
Tiny Mix Tapes	0.5/5 marks

Barry Walters, writing for Rolling Stone, noted how the duo She Wants Revenge's musicianship sounded similar to other new wave bands like Joy Division and The Cure, concluding that "She Wants Revenge steal from the best, and steal well." James Christopher Monger of AllMusic was mixed on Justin Warfield and Adam Bravin's post-punk homage to their new wave inspirations, saying, "[T]here's nothing wrong with honoring your influences by copping a few moves and singing in a fake British accent like Green Day with the intentions of updating a genre that many potential listeners are too young to have experienced first-hand, but it's another thing to do it without even the slightest deviation." Adam Moerder from Pitchfork was critical of the album, describing the song titles as "lazy permutations of post-punk poetry," found the melodies on the rock tracks too repetitive, and saw the highlights as being "eerily predictable." He concluded by calling the record, "Too ugly and inaccessible to suggest some sort of post-punk cash-out, they stick out in a batch of songs too bent on edifying studio wizardry over musicianship." Dave Gurney of Tiny Mix Tapes heavily panned the album's overall sound for lacking the energy their '80s influences had and the duo's lyricism feeling like high school poetry, saying "these guys sound like an incredibly desperate attempt to cash in on the neo-post-punk bandwagon."

== Commercial performance ==
As of September 2007, She Wants Revenge has sold 294,000 copies in the United States, according to Nielsen SoundScan.

== Track listing ==
All lyrics are written by Justin Warfield; all music is composed by Warfield and Adam Bravin.

No.	Title	Length
1.	"Red Flags and Long Nights"	5:10
2.	"These Things"	5:14
3.	"I Don't Wanna Fall in Love"	3:39
4.	"Out of Control"	3:39
5.	"Monologue"	4:56
6.	"Broken Promises for Broken Hearts"	3:19
7.	"Sister"	5:18
8.	"Disconnect"	2:29
9.	"Us"	4:23
10.	"Someone Must Get Hurt"	4:48
11.	"Tear You Apart"	4:46
12.	"She Loves Me, She Loves Me Not"	5:21
66.	"Killing Time"	7:48
Total length:		60:12

UK edition bonus tracks
No.	Title	Length
13.	"Spend the Night"	4:22
14.	"Black Liner Run"	4:52
Total length:		69:26

Japanese edition bonus track
No.	Title	Length
15.	"Tear You Apart" (Chris Holmes Vs. Bystanders Remix)	6:40
Total length:		76:06

The hidden track "Killing Time" is at track 66, after 53 blank tracks (51 on the UK CD), which are entitled "Wasted Air" – 0:04.

== Personnel ==
All credits for She Wants Revenge are adapted from the album's liner notes.

She Wants Revenge

- Justin Warfield – vocals, guitars; production, engineering
- Adam Bravin – bass, keyboards, percussion, programming; production

Technical personnel

- Michael Patterson – mixing
- Greg Calbi – mastering
- Michael Muller – photography

== Charts ==
=== Weekly charts ===
Chart (2006)	Peak position
US Billboard 200	38
US Top Dance Albums (Billboard)	3
US Top Rock Albums (Billboard)	9

=== Year-end charts ===
Chart (2006)	Position
US Top Dance/Electronic Albums (Billboard)	4
Chart (2007)	Position
US Top Dance/Electronic Albums (Billboard)	20

== Certifications ==
Region	Certification	Certified units/sales
United States (RIAA)	Gold	500,000^{‡}
^{‡} Sales+streaming figures based on certification alone.
