= Unknown Territory =

Unknown Territory may refer to:

- Unknown Territory (Bomb the Bass album)
- Unknown Territory (Dick Dale album)
