= Noriko =

- Pronunciation: [noɾiko]
- Gender: Female
- Language: Japanese

Origin
- Meaning: Multiple meanings depending on the kanji used

Noriko (のりこ, ノリコ) is a Japanese given name for females.

== Written forms ==
Forms in kanji can include:

- 徳子, "benevolence child"
- 法子, "method, law child"
- 則子, "rule child"
- 紀子, "chronicle child"
- 教子, "teach child"
- 範子, "pattern child"
- 典子, "rule, precedent, ceremony child"
- 規子, "standard, measure child"
- 憲子, "constitution child"
- 稔子, "child who harvests wisdom and knowledge"
- 雅子, "beauty child"
- 希子, "hope child"
- 倫子, "ethics child"
- 矩子, "ruler child"
- 能理子, "child who is skilled in reason, logic"
- 乃理子, "child of reason"

== People with the name ==
- Princess Noriko (範子内親王; 1177–1210), Empress of Japan during the early Kamakura period
- Noriko Akatsuka (1937–2016), Japanese-born American scholar
- Noriko Anno (阿武 教子; born 1976), Japanese judoka
- Noriko Aota (青田 典子; born 1966), Japanese tarento, actress and former idol singer
- Noriko Aoyama (青山 倫子; born 1978), Japanese former model and actress
- Noriko Arai (荒井 のり子; born 1973), Japanese paralympic athlete
- Noriko Asano (浅野 典子; born 1955), Japanese swimmer
- Noriko Awaya (淡谷 のり子; 1907–1999), Japanese female soprano chanteuse and singer
- Noriko Baba (馬場 典子; born 1977), Japanese former football player
- Noriko Eguchi (江口 のりこ; born 1980), Japanese film and television actress
- Noriko Fukuda (福田 典子; born 1991), Japanese announcer
- Noriko Fukushima (福島 のり子; born 1979), Japanese freestyle skier
- Noriko Furuya (古屋 範子; born 1956), Japanese politician
- Noriko H. Arai (新井 紀子; born 1962), Japanese researcher in mathematical logic and artificial intelligence
- Noriko Harada (原田 教子; born 1972), Japanese softball player
- Noriko Hayami (速水 典子; born 1959), Japanese actress
- Noriko Hidaka (日髙 のり子; born 1962), Japanese actress, voice actress, singer and narrator
- Noriko Higashide (東出 典子; born 1963), Japanese actress
- Noriko Higuchi (樋口 紀子; born 1985), Japanese long-distance runner
- Noriko Honma (本間 文子; 1911–2009), Japanese actress
- Noriko Horiuchi (堀内 詔子; born 1965), Japanese politician
- Noriko Ibaragi (茨木 のり子; 1926-2006), Japanese poet, playwright, essayist, children's literature writer, and translator
- Noriko Ikeuchi (池内 紀子; born 1999), Japanese kickboxer
- Noriko Inada (稲田 法子; born 1978), Japanese swimmer
- Noriko Iriyama (入山 法子; born 1985), Japanese actress and model
- Noriko Ishibashi (石橋 紀子; born 1970), Japanese former football player
- Noriko Ishigaki (石垣 のりこ; born 1974), Japanese politician
- Noriko Ito (伊藤 則子; born 1976), Japanese para-badminton player
- Noriko Kajiwara (梶原 紀子; born 1967), Japanese Paralympic swimmer
- Noriko Kamachi (蒲池 法子; born 1962), known as Seiko Matsuda, Japanese singer-songwriter and idol
- Noriko Kamakura (鎌倉 矩子; 1939–2023), Japanese practitioner, researcher, and academic leader in occupational therapy
- Noriko Kariya (ノリコ カリヤ; born 1979), Canadian professional female boxer
- Noriko Katō (加藤 紀子; born 1973), Japanese singer and actress
- Noriko Kawakami (川上 紀子), Japanese electrical engineer
- Noriko Kawamura, Japanese teacher
- Noriko Kijima (木嶋 のりこ; born 1988), Japanese gravure idol and actress
- Noriko Kodera (小寺 法子; born 1979), Japanese new age artist better known as Dream Dolphin
- Noriko Koiso (小磯 典子; born 1974), Japanese former basketball player
- Noriko Kosai (香西 式子; born 1955), Japanese sport shooter
- Noriko Kubo (久保 紀子; born 1972), Japanese fencer
- Noriko Matsuda (松田 紀子; born 1952), Japanese volleyball player and Olympic champion
- Noriko Matsueda (松枝 賀子; born 1971), Japanese former video game composer
- Noriko Matsumoto (松本 典子; born 1968), Japanese singer and television personality
- Noriko Matsumoto (actress) (松本 典子; 1935–2014), Japanese actress and stage director
- Noriko Mitose (みとせ のりこ), Japanese singer
- Noriko Miyagawa (宮川 典子; 1979–2019), Japanese politician
- Noriko Mizoguchi (溝口 紀子; born 1971), Japanese retired judoka
- Noriko Mizuta (水田 宗子; born 1937), Japanese scholar and poet
- Noriko Mochizuki (望月 のり子; born 1967), Japanese gymnast
- Noriko Munekata (宗像 記子; born 1974), Japanese judoka
- Noriko Nakagoshi (中越 典子; born 1979), Japanese actress
- Noriko Nakayama (中山 紀子; born 1943), Japanese former badminton player
- Noriko Namiki (並木 のり子; born 1972), Japanese voice actress; see Idaten Jump
- Noriko Narazaki (楢崎 教子; born 1972), Japanese retired judoka
- Noriko Narushima (成島 憲子; 1898–1976), Japanese politician and women's right activist
- Noriko Nishimoto (西本 則子; 1940–2016), Japanese–Australian puppeteer
- Noriko Oda (織田 憲子; born 1947), Japanese figure skating coach and former competitor
- Noriko Ogawa (pianist) (小川典子; born 1962), Japanese classical pianist
- Noriko Ogawa (singer) (小川 範子; born 1973), Japanese actress and J-pop singer
- Noriko Ogiwara (荻原 規子; born 1959), Japanese fantasy writer
- Noriko Ohara (小原 乃梨子; 1935–2024), Japanese actress and narrator
- Noriko Ohara (ballet) (大原 永子; born 1943), Japanese artistic director and retired ballet dancer
- Noriko Osumi (大隅 典子; born 1960), Japanese neuroscientist
- Noriko Rikimaru (力丸 乃りこ; born 1976), Japanese voice actress and narrator
- Noriko Sakai (酒井 法子; born 1971), Japanese singer and actress
- Noriko Sasaki (佐々木 倫子; born 1961), Japanese manga artist
- Noriko Sato (佐藤 紀子; born 1959), Japanese figure skating coach and former competitor
- Noriko Sawada Bridges Flynn (1923–2003), Japanese American writer and civil rights activist
- Noriko Sekiguchi, Japanese musician known as Poison Girl Friend
- Noriko Senge (千家 典子; born 1988), Japanese former princess of the Japanese Imperial Family
- Noriko Sengoku (千石 規子; 1922–2012), Japanese film and television actress
- Noriko Shibasaki (芝崎 典子; born 1991), Japanese voice actress
- Noriko Shibuta (渋田 紀子; born 1972), Japanese rower
- Noriko Shiina (椎名 法子; born 1982), Japanese actress, tarento, and singer
- Noriko Shinohara (born 1953), Japanese-American multi-disciplinary fine artist
- Noriko Shitaya (下屋 則子; born 1982), Japanese voice actress
- Noriko Suzuki (すずき 紀子), Japanese voice actress; see Doctor Neo Cortex
- Noriko T. Reider, Japanese author
- Noriko Tadano (只野 徳子; born 1978), Japanese tsugaru shamisen performer, composer and vocalist
- Noriko Taniguchi (谷口 令子; born 1992), Japanese rugby sevens player
- Noriko Tatsumi (辰巳 典子; born 1947), Japanese pink film actress
- Noriko Toda (戸田 則子; born 1965), Japanese former female speed skater
- Noriko Tsuiki (築城 則子; born 1952), Japanese textile artist and weaver
- Noriko Tsukase (つかせ のりこ; 1945–1989), Japanese voice actress and chanson singer
- Noriko Ueda (植田 典子; born 1972), Japanese jazz bassist, composer and arranger
- Noriko Uemura (上村 典子; born 1963), Japanese actress, voice actress and narrator
- Noriko Watanabe (渡辺 典子; born 1965), Japanese actress and singer
- Noriko Yamaji (山路 典子; born 1970), Japanese softball player
- Noriko Yamamoto (山本 憲子; born 1944), Japanese swimmer
- Noriko Yamanaka (山中 教子; born 1941), Japanese female table tennis player
- Noriko Yamashita (山下 規子; born 1945), Japanese former volleyball player
- Tujiko Noriko (ツジコノリコ; born 1976), Japanese musician, actor and director

== Fictional characters ==
- Noriko Ashida who also goes by the codename Surge from New X-Men
- Noriko Chōfu, a character of the multimedia project Ikizulive! Love Live! Bluebird
- Noriko Hirayama, a character of the Yasujirō Ozu film, Tokyo Story (the daughter-in-law)
- Noriko Kawada, a character of Digimon
- Noriko Kinoshita, a character of Juvenile
- Noriko Nakagawa, a main character of the book and film Battle Royale
- Noriko Nijo, a character of Maria-sama ga Miteru
- Noriko from Usagi Yojimbo, the villain of the "Treasure of the Mother of Mountains" arc
- Noriko Shimabara, titular character of the film Noriko's Dinner Table
- Noriko Takaya, a character of Gunbuster
- Noriko Ukai, a character of the manga Gravitation
- Noriko Ono, one of the main character's daughters in An Artist of the Floating World
- Noriko Noshimuri, a character of the television series Hawaii Five-0
- Noriko Momoi, a friend character of Mami Sakura from Esper Mami
- Noriko Hibino, a character of the video game Generation Xth

== See also ==
- Houko Kuwashima (桑島 法子), Japanese voice actress and singer
