= Clear (Bomb the Bass album) =

Studio album by Bomb the Bass
- Released: 3 April 1995
- Studio: Eastcote (London)
- Genre: Trip hop
- Length: 53:18
- Label: 4th & B'way
- Producers: Tim Simenon; Keith LeBlanc; Doug Wimbish

Bomb the Bass chronology
Unknown Territory (1991)	Clear (1995)	Future Chaos (2008)

Singles from Clear
- 1. "Bug Powder Dust" Released: 19 September 1994; 2. "Dark Heart" Released: 1994; 3. "One to One Religion" Released: 20 March 1995; 4. "Sandcastles" Released: 4 September 1995

Clear is the third studio album by English electronic music act Bomb the Bass released on 3 April 1995 by 4th & B'way Records.

== Release ==
Clear was released on 3 April 1995 by 4th & B'way Records. It peaked at number 22 on the UK Albums Chart.

"Bug Powder Dust" was issued as the lead single from Clear on 19 September 1994, peaking at number 24 on the UK Singles Chart. "Dark Heart" followed later that year, reaching number 35 on the chart. A further two singles were released in 1995: "One to One Religion" on 20 March, and "Sandcastles" on 4 September. They charted in the UK at numbers 53 and 54 respectively.

== Critical reception ==
Professional ratings
Review scores
Source	Rating
AllMusic	4.5/5 stars
The Guardian	4/4 stars
Q	4/5 stars
Rolling Stone	3/5 stars
Select	4/5

NME named Clear the 42nd best album of 1995. In 2015, Fact placed the record at number 49 on its list of the best trip hop albums of all time.

== Track listing ==
No.	Title	Writer(s)	Length
1.	"Bug Powder Dust" (with Justin Warfield)	Tim Simenon; Warfield	4:18
2.	"Sleepyhead" (with Bim Sherman)	Simenon; Sherman; Keith LeBlanc; Skip McDonald	3:59
3.	"One to One Religion" (with Carlton)	Simenon; Carlton McCarthy; Dave Clayton; Ben Wolff; Andy Dean; Ben Barson; Kent Brainerd	4:14
4.	"Dark Heart" (with Spikey T)	Simenon; Trevor Rennie; Clayton	6:47
5.	"If You Reach the Border" (with Leslie Winer)	Simenon; Winer	3:53
6.	"Brain Dead" (with Justin Warfield)	Simenon; Warfield	5:33
7.	"5ml. Barrel" (with Will Self)	Simenon; Self; Atticus Ross; John Wardle; Clayton	4:59
8.	"Somewhere"	Clayton	5:03
9.	"Sandcastles" (with Bernard Fowler)	Fowler; Doug Wimbish	4:34
10.	"Tidal Wave" (with River)	Minnie Driver; Adam Holden; Ross; Ivor Guest	4:08
11.	"Empire" (with Benjamin Zephaniah and Sinéad O'Connor)	Simenon; Zephaniah; O'Connor	5:50
Total length:			53:18

US edition
No.	Title	Writer(s)	Length
1.	"One to One Religion" (Skankapella mix; with Carlton)	Simenon; McCarthy; Clayton; Wolff; Dean; Barson; Brainerd	4:29
2.	"Tidal Wave" (with River)	Driver; Holden; Ross; Guest	4:07
3.	"Somewhere"	Clayton	5:02
4.	"Dark Heart" (7" edit; with Spikey T)	Simenon; Rennie; Clayton	4:28
5.	"Brain Dead" (with Justin Warfield)	Simenon; Warfield	5:32
6.	"Empire" (with Benjamin Zephaniah and Sinéad O'Connor)	Simenon; Zephaniah; O'Connor	5:49
7.	"If You Reach the Border" (with Leslie Winer)	Simenon; Winer	3:52
8.	"Sandcastles" (with Bernard Fowler)	Fowler; Wimbish	4:34
9.	"Sleepyhead" (with Bim Sherman)	Simenon; Sherman; LeBlanc; McDonald	3:58
10.	"Bug Powder Dust" (Kruder & Dorfmeister session; with Justin Warfield)	Simenon; Warfield	7:25
Total length:			49:16

Sample credits

- "Bug Powder Dust" contains samples of Naked Lunch.

== Personnel ==
Credits are adapted from the album's liner notes.

Musicians

- Tim Simenon – drum programming, sampling
- Carlton – vocals (track 3)
- Dave Clayton – keyboards (tracks 1, 3–11), keyboard effects (tracks 10, 11), sampling (track 8), additional sampling (tracks 3–7)
- Danny Cummings – percussion (tracks 3, 4, 9–11)
- Bernard Fowler – vocals (track 9)
- Ivor Guest – drum programming (track 10), keyboard effects (track 10), sampling (track 10)
- Adam Holden – bass (track 10), additional programming (track 6), additional sampling (track 6)
- Kenji Jammer – guitar (tracks 2, 3)
- Keith LeBlanc – drum programming (tracks 2, 9), drums (track 4), sampling (tracks 2, 9)
- Inder "Goldfinger" Matharu – percussion (track 2)
- Skip McDonald – guitar (tracks 2, 9, 11), backing vocals (track 2)
- Sinéad O'Connor – vocals (track 11)
- River – vocals (track 10)
- Atticus Ross – programming (tracks 1, 7), drum programming (track 10), sampling (track 10), additional programming (track 6), additional sampling (tracks 1, 6, 7)
- Claudia Sarne – bass (track 6)
- Jeff Scantlebury – percussion (track 2)
- Will Self – vocals (track 7)
- Bim Sherman – vocals (track 2)
- Sista Joy – backing vocals (track 4)
- Spikey T – vocals (track 4)
- Justin Warfield – vocals (tracks 1, 6)
- Doug Wimbish – bass (tracks 1, 9, 11), bass effects (track 11)
- Leslie Winer – vocals (track 5)
- Jah Wobble – bass (track 7)
- Benjamin Zephaniah – vocals (track 11)

Production

- Tim Simenon – production, mixing
- Don Hozz – programming engineering
- Keith LeBlanc – production (track 2), mixing (track 2)
- Lee Boy – assistance
- Mike Marsh – mastering
- Q – mix engineering, recording
- Tom – assistance
- Doug Wimbish – production (track 9), mixing (track 9)

Design

- Richard Baker – editing
- The Baron von Kallstein – photography
- Cally on U Art – artwork, design
- Rob Crane – typography
- Phil Smee – photography

== Charts ==
Chart (1995)	Peak position
Australian Albums (ARIA)	122
European Top 100 Albums (Music & Media)	59
Scottish Albums (Official Charts)	38
UK Albums (Official Charts)	22
UK Dance Albums (OCC)	1
UK R&B Albums (Official Charts)	3
