= Indians in Moscow =

English synth-pop band

- Origin: Hull, England
- Genres: Synth-pop; new wave; electronic
- Years active: 1981–1985; 1998–present
- Labels: Kennick; Nemesis; Other Voices; Posh Music; Mankind; Melt Productions
- Members: Pete Riches; Stuart Walton; Simon Le Vans
- Past members: Adele Nozedar; Rich Hornby; Tom Hosie; Chris Guard
- Website: indiansinmoscow.com

Indians in Moscow are an English synth-pop band formed in Hull in 1981 who later moved into the techno and house music genres.

== History ==
The band was formed in 1981 by the keyboardists Pete Riches and Stuart Walton (formerly of the Most), and lead vocalist Adele Nozedar. The band later expanded to five members with the addition of a guitarist and a drummer (Rich Hornby). The band's first release was a contribution to the various artists compilation Your Secret's Safe with Us in 1982.

They came to fame on the cult 1980s Channel 4 music television programme The Tube as part of the show's Hull music special, and had three hits on the UK Indie Chart with "Naughty Miranda", "I Wish I Had" and "Jack Pelter & His Sex Change Chicken". After the release of their extended play (EP) Big Wheel(1984), the band's debut and sole eponymous studio album was released in 1985. The band broke-up shortly afterwards.

After Indians in Moscow broke-up, Nozedar formed a new band, the Fever Tree, along with drummer Tom Hosie (who had replaced Hornby), Ali McMordie from Stiff Little Fingers and guitarists Nik Corfield and Rob Dean of Japan. In 1988, Nozedar would feature as part of the promotion for "Beat Dis" by Bomb the Bass, a sample-heavy dance single which would peak at number two on the UK singles chart dated 21 to 27 February 1988.

Riches and Walton reformed the band in 1998 with lead vocalist Chris Guard, releasing the singles "Wrong Love" and "Babylon", and the studio album Ten Days to Live, which they self-financed. After Guard left, Riches and Walton recruited house and garage disc jockey (DJ) Simon Le Vans, releasing the Something Wonderful EP. The group has continued since, with two studio albums released in 2004. Walton and Guard worked together again in the band Gregoryz Girl.

In 2011, their eponymous debut studio album was reissued on CD via Other Voices Records.

== Discography ==
=== Albums ===
- Indians in Moscow (1984), Kennick
- Ten Days to Live (1994), Nemesis
- Indians in Moscow (2011), Other Voices

=== Singles ===
Chart placings shown are from the UK Indie Chart, unless otherwise stated.

- "Naughty Miranda" (1983), Kennick – No. 5
- "I Wish I Had" (1984), Kennick – No. 27
- "Jack Pelter & His Sex Change Chicken" (1984), Kennick – No. 16, UK No. 101
- Big Wheel EP (1984), Kennick
- "Wrong Love" (1991), Posh Music
- "Babylon"
- "People in Space" (1998), Mankind
- Melt Productions E.P. (1998), Melt Productions
