= Heavy Glow =

American rock band

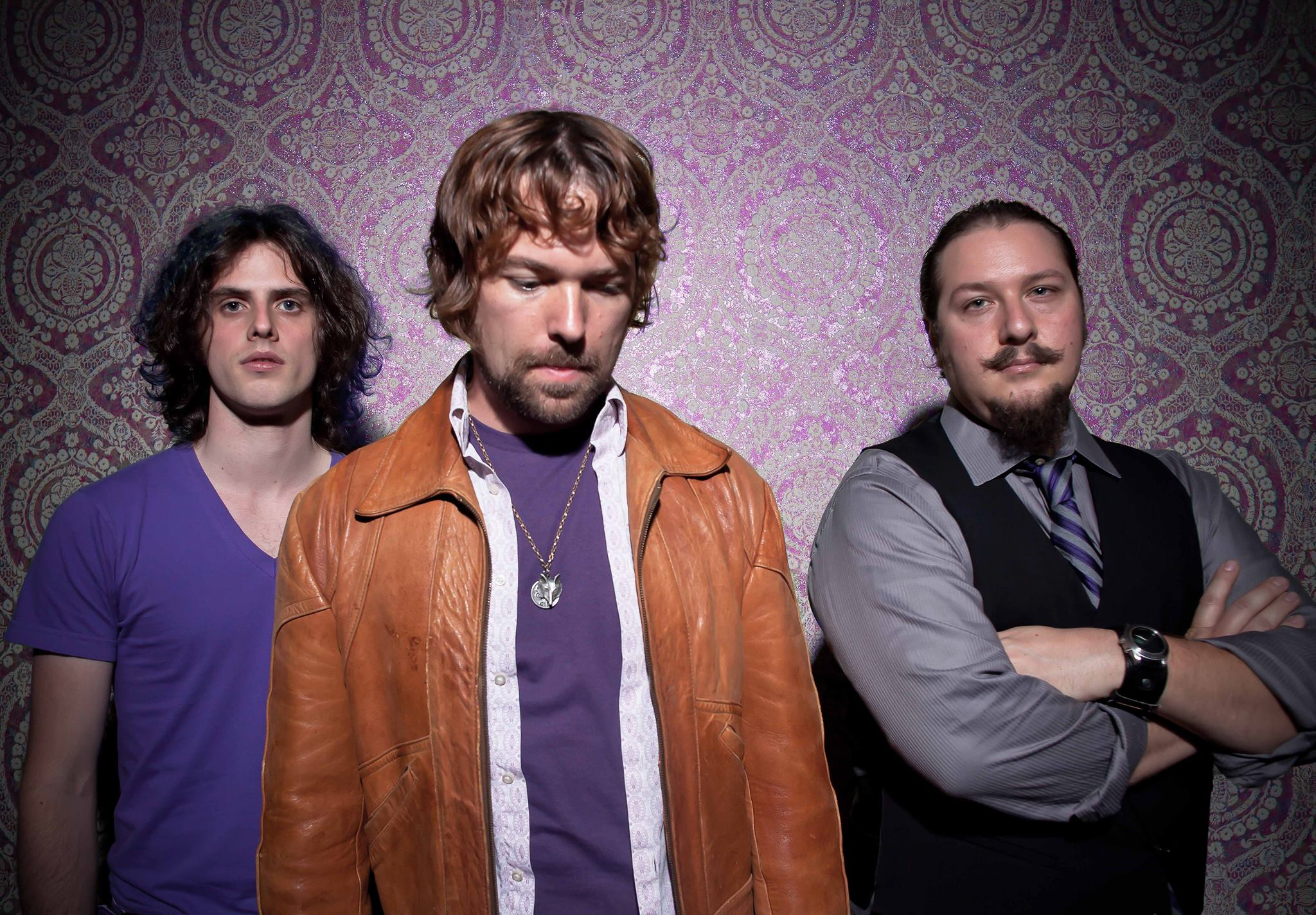
- Heavy Glow in 2013

Background information
- Origin: San Diego, CA
- Genres: Rock and roll; psychedelic rock; blues rock; hard rock
- Years active: 2008–2016
- Labels: StockXChange Music Group/SONY BMG Australia, Kozmik Artifactz (Germany), Restricted Release
- Members: Jared Mullins
- Past members: Dave Rollans; Dan Kurtz; Joe Brooks; Andrew Hoffman
- Website: heavyglowmusic.com

Heavy Glow was a modern American rock band originally from San Diego, California. Formed by vocalist and guitarist Jared Mullins, the band released two albums, two EP's, one single, and three music videos.

== History ==
Drummer Jared Mullins moved from Cleveland, Ohio to San Diego and began posting ads on Craigslist looking for a bass player. Joe Brooks responded. After Jared switched from playing drums to playing guitar and singing, the two formed Heavy Glow along with drummer Dave Rollans. At this time Mullins also began doing in-studio guitar tech work in Los Angeles. A chance meeting landed a role as guitar tech for Stevie Salas during recording sessions for Justin Timberlake and T.I. After hearing early demos Stevie Salas brought the band to Matt Sorum's private studio in Los Angeles to produce the band's first EP. The band shortly thereafter signed to Australian record label StockXChange Music Group/Sony Australia. FOX's television series The Good Guys used the track “Grinning in the Dark” in its second episode.

StockXChange Music unexpectedly disbanded in early 2010 without compensating the band for EP sales. The band then independently recorded "The Filth & The Fury" in one, six-hour live studio recording session. Classic Rock Magazine UK distributed the song “Hot Mess” in a sampler CD for its July issue. The Filth & The Fury was nominated for Best Rock Album of the Year at the 2010 San Diego Music Awards. After which time Mullins became a part-time spokesperson for RockStar Solos and did a promotional video with Stevie Salas and Ron Blair.

In 2011 the band released their debut album Midnight Moan. In 2012 the band recorded a follow-up album with producers Michael Patterson Production Credits and Nic Jodoin. In July 2013, CBS used "Headhunter" in the second episode of the Stephen King series "Under The Dome." The band's follow-up album, Pearls and Swine and Everything Fine, was released in 2014. The band released a music video featuring Mayra Leal of the Robert Rodriguez movie Machete.

== Musical style and influences ==
Heavy Glow was often described as a blend of blues, soul, Motown, psychedelia, classic rock and hard rock with comparisons to bands such as Foo Fighters.

== Band members ==
Past Studio Members

- Jared Mullins
- Dan Kurtz
- Dave Rollans
- Joe Brooks
- Andrew Hoffman

== Discography ==
- Heavy Glow (EP) (2009)
- The Filth & The Fury (EP) (2010)
- Midnight Moan (2011)
- Mine All Mine/Headhunter 7 (Single) (2013)
- Pearls and Swine and Everything Fine (2014)

== Music videos ==
- "It's Too Late" (2012)
- "Look What You're Doing To Me" (2014)
- "Domino (Black Flowers)" (August 25, 2015)
