= Kumo (musician) =

British composer and musician (born 1965)

Jono Podmore, better known by his pseudonym Kumo, is a British musician and composer born in 1965.

== Biography ==
Kumo came into existence in 1994 when composer, producer, engineer and arranger Jono Podmore began work at Watershed Studios, London and with Plink Plonk records, founding two sister labels to Plink Plonk: Autoi and Psychomat. He began to play the theremin, developing new techniques for live performance of electronic music.

After a string of singles, remixes, live dates and international DJ commitments as Kumo, March 1997 saw the release of his first album Kaminari to significant critical acclaim.

Also in 1997, Kumo moved temporarily to France to work with Irmin Schmidt (of Can) on Schmidt's opera Gormenghast, which premiered in 1998 and was re-staged in 2004. A selection from the opera recorded and mixed by Jono was released on Spoon/Mute records in 2000.

October 2000 saw the release of the second Kumo album 1+1=1 on Spoon Records.

In 2001, after extensive touring including the Sonar festival, the London Jazz Festival and the Can Solo Projects tour, the first Irmin Schmidt and Kumo album Masters of Confusion was released worldwide. Later the same year, they created the sound installation Flies, Guys and Choirs for the Barbican Centre as part of the Elektronik festival. The installation is now available as a sonic experience for public spaces. The duo continued to perform and give workshops together across Europe and work on film and TV music together including award-winning German TV series and dramas.

The fout-track EP Kumo and Friends was released on Electric Tones Records in early 2003 and a successful collaboration with B.J. Cole was released on the album Trouble in Paradise.

In 2004, Jono was appointed Professor of the Practice of Popular Music at the prestigious Hochschule für Musik und Tanz Köln (Cologne Conservatory of Music and Dance), Germany. He created and leads the MMus Production post-graduate course and installed a professional recording studio.

After further live appearances together, work began on a second Irmin Schmidt and Kumo album and the duo also made remixes (including P.I.L), performed live, held workshops in Germany and Portugal, and produced the album dot i/o for Mito Ichikawa.

The second Irmin Schmidt and Kumo album, Axolotl Eyes, was released in Spring 2008 on Spoon/Mute/Warners and was set for release in Japan on P-Vine Autumn 2008. The seven-track album comes with a bonus DVD containing the complete sound installation Flies, Guys and Choirs in 5.1, accompanied by a two-hour film co-directed by Jono. The DVD was screened at the Sonar Festival, Barcelona; Les Chants Mechaniques festival, Lille; and for the entire Short Circuit Festival at The Roundhouse, London in May 2011.

In 2007, a four-track Kumo EP entitled Metapolis was released digitally on iTunes by White Label Records.

In late 2009, Kumo founded a new and ongoing analogue electronic music collective Metamono. With critically praised analogue-only releases and live events under their belt, the first vinyl release, Tape EP, was released on 23 January 2012. This was followed by a series of EPs, two albums With the Compliments of Nuclear Physics and Creative Listening, and a collection of music for silent film Secrets of Nature.

The Cyclopean EP with Jaki Liebezeit, Irmin Schmidt and Burnt Friedman was recorded in 2012, mixed by Jono and released on Mute/Spoon records in 2013.

Live performances, DJ sets and workshops as Kumo continued with shows in Japan, Macedonia, Kosovo, Los Angeles and UK including the Ministry of Sound, Avant-Garde Festival Schiphorst, London Analogue Festival and The Royal Festival Hall (with Metamono and The Orb).

Psychomat Records was restarted in 2017 with the release of Ms Slipper/Lewes 7” single with Swantje Lichtenstein.

Jono contributed the track Freude to New Clockwork Music, a compilation album for Electronic Sound magazine, inspired by Stanley Kubrick’s film A Clockwork Orange.

Other work as Kumo in 2018/19 included the release and subsequent sell-out of 60-minute piece Day/Night on renowned cassette label Tapeworm; live improvised performance Chamber Remix at Rhenania, Cologne, derived from data generated by the movements of the bowing arms of the Kelemen Quartett playing Bartók‘s 5th String Quartet; and a live performance at the Crystal Palace Festival of a specially commissioned extended version of Joy Division‘s Transmission.

The cassette Hallraum with Swantje Lichtenstein was released on Tapeworm in 2020 to critical acclaim:

“Cool …a weirdly composed feel and brim with events both dreamy and unexpected.” (The Wire Feb 2020)

During the Covid lockdowns Jono’s regular livestream on Crystal Palace Lockdown Live attracted thousands of views and a Kumo EP Euclidean Patterns, released on Sound-Space records (Aug 2020), was created entirely under lockdown conditions.

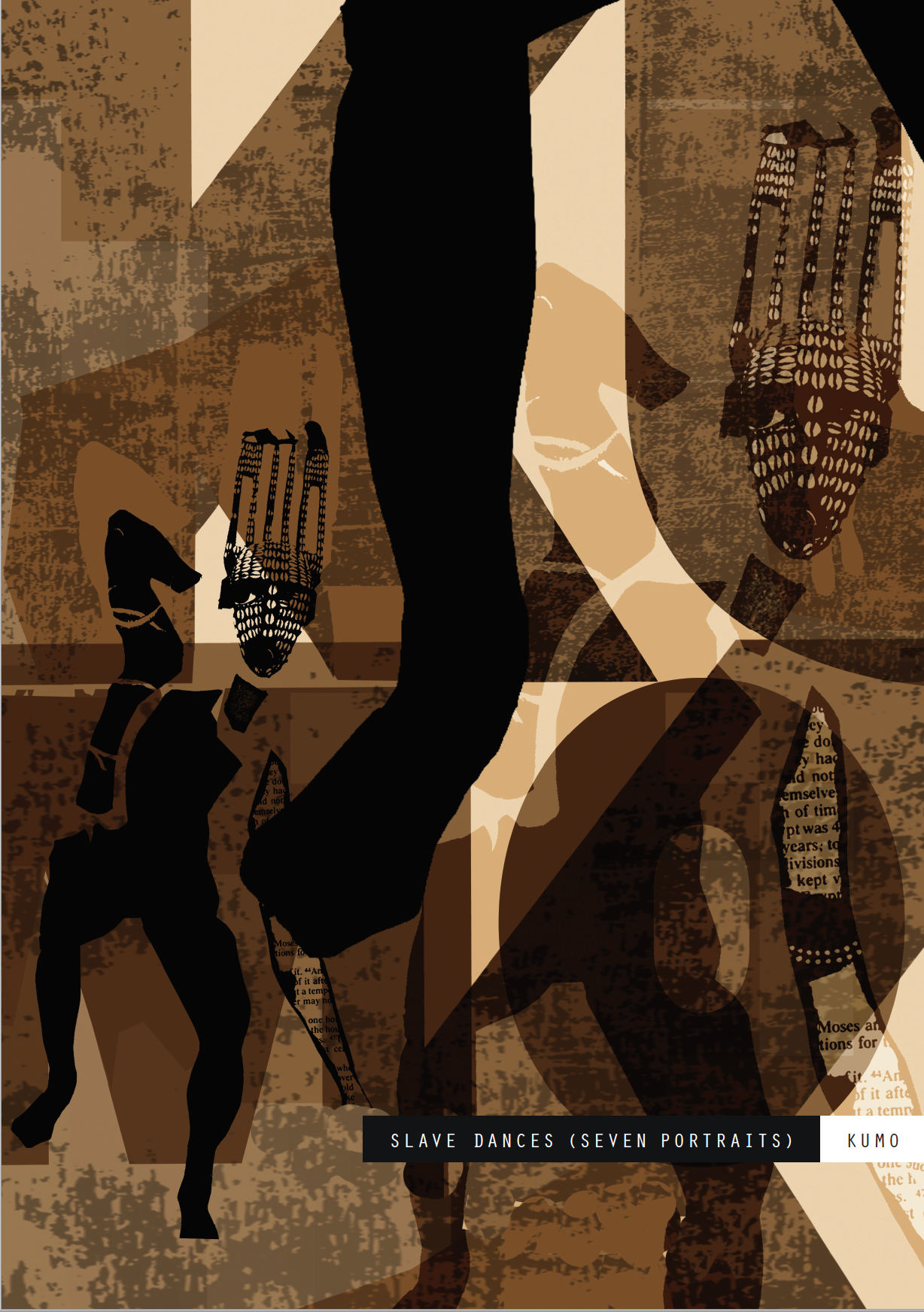
Front Cover of the Slave Dances (Seven Portraits) Fanzine by Kumo 2021

The success of the EP led to an album for Sound-Space: Slave Dances (Seven Portraits), the first Kumo album since 2000, released in August 2021. The album is accompanied by a 52-page zine with text by Jono, art by Joyce Treasure] and design by Dan Taylor. A three-track Kumo EP Three Tigers was released in early 2022 to mark the Chinese Year of the Tiger to critical acclaim: “With Three Tigers, Podmore has once again shown himself to be a masterful arranger of conceptual, deep-thinking electronic music.” (Mat Smith)

Later the same year, two further digital releases (Rubicon and Alea Iacta Est) appeared on Bandcamp supported by live performances including Iklektic and Cafe Oto, London.

=== Film work ===
In 1988, Podmore composed the soundtrack for TV film Stanley's Vision directed by Rosemary Shepherd. Podmore worked on the soundtrack for, and co-produced, The Giaour.

== Discography ==
- No Need: Autoi ep 01 1996
- Armed Response: Psychomat PSY 1 1997
- 7 Buckets: Psychomat PSY 2 1997
- Together: Psychomat PSY 3 1997
- Kaminari: Psychomat PSYLP1 1997
- Kumo - 1+1=1: Spoon Records SPOON CD 46 2000
- Masters of Confusion (with Irmin Schmidt): Spoon Records SPOON CD 45 2001
- Kumo and Friends: Electric Tones Records e-tones 009 2003
- Metapolis (EP): iTunes/White Label Records 2007
- Axolotl Eyes (with Irmin Schmidt): Spoon Records CDSPOON48 2008
- Off to Titan (with Philippe Petit): Karl Records CD/Download 2010
- Tape EP (with Metamono): HoHum Records HOMUM017 2011
- Cyclopean EP: Mute/SPOON 56 2013
- Ms Slipper/Lewes: Psychomat PSY004 2017
- Day/Night: Tapeworm TTW#108 Limited edition cassette 2018
- Freude from New Clockwork Music LP compilation: Electronic Sound ESLP03 2018
- Hallraum with Swantje Lichtenstein: Tapeworm TTW#117 Limited edition cassette 2019
- Euclidean Patterns EP: Sound Space 2020
- Slave Dances LP and Fanzine: Sound Space 2021
- Three Tigers EP 2022
- Rubicon EP 2022
- Alea Iacta Est EP 2022
