= Michael Patterson (producer) =

American record producer and mixer

Michael Patterson is an American record producer and mixer. He has worked on the albums Midnite Vultures (1999) by Beck (where he was nominated for a Grammy award), Life After Death (1997) by Notorious B.I.G., the debut album by Black Rebel Motorcycle Club, B.R.M.C. (2001), and dark pop duo She Wants Revenge's first two albums, She Wants Revenge and This Is Forever.

He also mixed the soundtrack and score to The Social Network and The Girl With The Dragon Tattoo.

He has remixed such artists as Tricky, Mindless Self Indulgence and Puscifer (under the name Narcovice). Patterson works out of his studio "The Pleasuredome" in Los Angeles, California.

He also produced several songs for the 2007 Duran Duran album, Reportage. They were put aside following Andy Taylor's departure from the band; Duran Duran fansites have called this the "Lost Michael Patterson album".

He co-founded the Cloak & Dagger goth nightclub which ran from 2015 to 2020, but closed amid allegations of sexual misconduct and inaction by the owners.

Patterson produced Spleen United Neanderthal (for which he was nominated for a Danish music critics award for best producer 2008).

Patterson was born in Memphis, Tennessee.

== Partial discography ==
- 2013 - Eric Avery - Life.Time - Mixing
- 2013 - Nine Inch Nails - Live 2013 EP - Mixing
- 2013 - Heavy Glow - Mine All Mine/Headhunter 7 - Producer, Mixing
- 2013 - Black Rebel Motorcycle Club - Specter at the Feast - Mixing, Production
- 2014 - Atticus Ross - Love and Mercy - Mixing, Soundtrack
- 2014 - Heavy Glow - Pearls & Swine and Everything Fine Producer - Mixing
- 2014 - MØ - No Mythologies to Follow - Mixing
- 2015 - Saybia - No Sound from the Outside - Producer
- 2015 - Avec Sans - Resonate - Mixing
- Romy - Upcoming Album - Mixing
- 2016 - Saul Williams - Martyr Loser King - Mixing
- 2015 - Julie Mintz - The Thin Veil Mixing,
- Death Has No Dominion - Death Has No Dominion Mixing,
- The Bots - New Album - Mixing
- Home Video - Forget - Mixing,
- IO Echo - Ministry of Love - Mixing,
- Gliss - Langsom Danse Mixing, Additional Production
- Rob Simonsen - The Spectacular Now Music Scoring Mixer
- How to Destroy Angels - An Omen EP Mixing (one song)
- Atticus Ross - Broken City Mixing- Soundtrack
- Paint - Songs for Fighter Pilots Producer, Mixing
- Blaqk Audio - Bright Black Heaven Mixing
- Søren Huss - Oppefra og ned Mixing
- Home Video - Upcoming Album Mixing
- My Heart Belongs to Cecelia Winter - Upcoming Album Mixing
- Dear Boy - Upcoming Album Mixing
- Data Romance - Upcoming Album Mixing
- Trent Reznor and Atticus Ross - The Girl with the Dragon Tattoo soundtrack Mixing- Score and Soundtrack
- Trent Reznor and Atticus Ross - The Social Network soundtrack Mixing- Score and Soundtrack
- Azure Ray - Drawing Down the Moon Mixing
- Snow & Voices - Anything That Moves Mixing
- Sea Wolf - O Maria Mixing
- The Morlocks - The Morlocks Play Chess Mixing, Producer
- Amusement Parks on Fire – Road Eyes Mixing, Producer
- Puscifer – C is for..... Mixing
- Paper Route – Absence Mixing
- Great Northern – Remind Me Where the Light Is Mixing, Producer
- Malea McGuinness - Mixing, Producer
- O+S – O+S Mixing, Producer
- OPM – Golden State of Mind Mixing
- Ladytron – Velocifero Mixing
- Puscifer – V Is for Viagra: The Remixes Mixing, Producing (under the name Narcovice)
- The Fashion – Mix Tape for a Funeral Mixing
- She Wants Revenge – This Is Forever Mixing
- B5 – Don't Talk, Just Listen Mixing
- The Notorious B.I.G. – Greatest Hits Engineer, Mixing
- Soul Kid#1 – Americanized Mixing, Producer
- David Holmes – David Holmes Presents the Free Association Mixing
- She Wants Revenge – She Wants Revenge Mixing
- Sosohuman – Twenty-Six Mixing, Producer
- Limp Bizkit – Home Sweet Home/Bittersweet Symphony Mixing
- Ringside – Ringside Mixing
- Fischerspooner – Odyssey Mixing
- Isidore – Isidore, Sonic Guidance
- Sleepwell – Sleepwell, Sonic Guidance
- Shifty Shellshock – Happy Love Sick Mixing
- The Glitterati – Here Comes a Close Up Mixing, Producer
- Goldy Locks – Sometimes Engineer, Mixing, Producer
- Limp Bizkit – Results May Vary Mixing
- Tim Burgess – I Believe Mixing, Producer
- David Holmes – David Holmes Presents the Free Association Mixing
- Jennifer Lopez – I'm Gonna Be Alright / Walking On Sunshine Mixing
- Diddy – I Need a Girl Engineer, Mixing
- Diddy – We Invented the Remix Engineer
- Black Rebel Motorcycle Club – B.R.M.C. Mixing
- Custom – Fast Engineer, Mixing, Producer, Vocals (Background)
- The X-ecutioners – Built From Scratch Mixing
- Mr. Cheeks – Lights, Camera, Action! Mixing
- Mary J. Blige – No More Drama Engineer
- G. Dep – Child of the Ghetto Engineer, Mixing
- SWV – Best of SWV Mixing
- MC Lyte – Very Best of MC Lyte Mixing
- Little-T and One Track Mike – Fome Is Dape Mixing
- Jennifer Lopez – J.Lo Engineer, Mixing
- Diddy – The Saga Continues Mixing
- Geggy Tah – Into the Oh Mixing
- Gary Jules – Trading Snakeoil for Wolftickets Engineer, Mixing, Mastering
- Limp Bizkit – Chocolate Starfish and the Hot Dog Flavored Water Mixing
- Shyne – Shyne Mixing
- OPM – Menace to Sobriety Programming, Engineer, Producer, Mixing
- Lil' Kim – The Notorious K.I.M Engineer, Mixing
- Boyz II Men – Evolution Engineer
- Jimmy Barnes – Love and Fear Mixing
- Moby – Why Does My Heart Feel So Bad? FAFU Remix Associate Producer
- The Notorious B.I.G. – Born Again Engineer, Mixing
- Beck – Midnite Vultures Mixing
- Sauce Money – Middle Finger U Engineer
- Black Rob – Life Story Mixing
- Diddy – Forever Mixing, Engineer
- Barry White – Staying Power Engineer
- Lil' Cease – Wonderful World of Cease A Leo EngineerTracie
- Mase – Double Up Mixing
- R. Kelly – R. Engineer
- Total – Kima, Keisha & Pam Mixing
- Faith Evans – Keep the Faith Mixing
- 112 – Room 112 Mixing
- The LOX – Money, Power & Respect Engineer, Mixing
- Imajin – Shorty (You Keep Playin' with My Mind) MixingVarious Artists
- Jay-Z – In My Lifetime, Vol. 1 Engineer, Mixing
- Mase – Harlem World Engineer, Mixing
- LL Cool J – Phenomenon Engineer, Mixing
- Boyz II Men – Evolution Engineer
- SWV – Release Some Tension Mixing
- Diddy – No Way Out 1997 Engineer, Mixing
- The Notorious B.I.G. – Life After Death Engineer, Mixing
- TLC – CrazySexyCool Engineer, Mixing
- SWV – Someone Mixing
- 112 – 112 Engineer, Mixing
- Eternal – Power of a Woman Engineer, MIDI, Sound Design
- Monica – Miss Thang Engineer, Mixing
- A Few Good Men – Take a Dip Engineer
- Larry Springfield – I'm Just a Man Engineer
- Jus' Cauze – Jus' Cauze Programming, Engineering
- Jerry Butler – Time & Faith Sampling, Digital Editing
- Shawn Lane – Powers of Ten Editing
- Bend – Trying to Find Function Producer
- Lost Velvet – Dark Cells Mixing

== Controversy ==
In 2015, alongside his friend and business partner Adam Bravin, Patterson created the goth-oriented weekly club event Cloak & Dagger in Los Angeles, California. In June 2020, the event folded amidst allegations of sexual misconduct, sexual harassment and discriminatory treatment against people of color.
