= Back to Light =

Studio album by Bomb the Bass
- Released: 2010
- Genre: Electronica, electro, tech house
- Label: Studio !K7
- Producer: Tim Simenon, Paul Conboy, Gui Boratto

Bomb the Bass chronology
Future Chaos (2008)	Back to Light (2010)	In The Sun (2013)

Back to Light is the fifth studio album from Bomb The Bass, the Electronica collective formed around British producer and musician, Tim Simenon. Released in 2010, the album is produced by Bomb The Bass in association with Gui Boratto.

== Track listing ==
No.	Title	Length
1.	"Boy Girl"	4:15
2.	"X Rays Eyes" (with Kelley Polar)	4:20
3.	"The Infinites"	4:10
4.	"Price On Your Head" (with Richard Davis)	5:07
5.	"Blindspot"	5:21
6.	"Start" (with Kelley Polar)	5:41
7.	"Burn Less Brighter"	6:07
8.	"Happy To Be Cold" (with Richard Davis)	6:02
9.	"Up The Mountain" (with The Battle of Land and Sea)	4:44
10.	"Milakia" (with Martin Gore)	4:39

== Personnel ==
- Artwork By [Sleeve Optics] – Lopetz 10
- Mastered By – Simon Francis
- Mixed By – Foppe Talman, Tim Simenon
- Producer – Gui Boratto (tracks: 1 to 9), Martin Gore (tracks: 10), Paul Conboy, Tim Simenon
