= Other Voices Records =

Russian record label

- Founded: 2007
- Genre: New wave, synth-pop, industrial
- Country of origin: Russia
- Location: Nizhny Novgorod
- Official website: othervoicesrecords.com

Other Voices Records is a Russian-based independent record label. Its main focus is electronic music. The label was founded in 2007.

== Artists ==
- Attrition
- Tobias Bernstrup
- Indians In Moscow
- Merzbow
- Rise and Fall of a Decade

== Releases ==
- Indians In Moscow – Indians In Moscow CD (2011)
- Attrition – The Truth In Dark Corners CD / DD / MC (2011)
- Gifts In Secret – Reaching CD (2011)
- Individual Industry – Twenty Years In One Hour CD / DD (2011)
- Forthcoming Fire – Set The World On Fire CD (2010)
- Aerial FX – Same River Twice CD / DD (2010)
- Neon – Memories CD / DD (2010) - 2nd edition
- Various – Other Voices CD (2010)
- Sensor – Naked CD / DD (2009)
- Sensor – Off-White Trash DD (2009)
- The Last Hour – The Last Hour CD / DD (2009)
- The Last Hour – The Last Hour EP DD (2009)
- Neon – Memories CD / DD (2008) – 1st edition
- Speaking Silence – Insides CD / DD (2008)
- Rise And Fall Of A Decade – Yesterday, Today & Tomorrow CD / DD (2007)
- Angie Damage – Nicotine Tongue EP CD / DD (2007)
- Eleven Pond – Bas-Relief CD (2011)
- Tobias Bernstrup – Sing My Body Electric LP / CD / MC (2012)
- Nouvelle Phénomène – Glory Of Romance LP / CD (2014)
- Soft Riot – Fiction Prediction LP / CD / MC (2013)
- A New Life – Fright †reasures MC (2013)
- Stress – The Big Wheel LP / CD (2013)
- Parade Ground - A Room With A View LP / CD / MC (2015)
- Parade Ground - Sanctuary MC (2016)
- Parade Ground – Cut Up CD (2016)
- New Politicians - Remission CD (2016)
- Pronoise – Low Light Vision CD (2016)
- Merzbow – Escape Mask LP / CD (2016)
- Sonic Death – Hate Machine LP / MC (2016)
- Anything Box – Hope LP (2016)
- Bill And Murray – A New Kind Of High LP / CD (2016)
- m-fast – Videoband MC (2016)
