= My Field Trip to Planet 9 =

Studio album by Justin Warfield
- Released: July 13, 1993
- Genre: Alternative hip hop; psychedelic rap; trip hop
- Length: 59:50
- Label: Qwest
- Producer: Justin Warfield; QDIII; Prince Paul

Justin Warfield chronology
My Field Trip to Planet 9 (1993)	The Justin Warfield Supernaut (1995)

Singles from My Field Trip to Planet 9
- 1. "K Sera Sera" Released: 1993; 2. "Fisherman's Grotto" Released: 1993; 3. "Pick It Up Y'all" Released: 1994

My Field Trip to Planet 9 is the debut studio album by Justin Warfield. It was released on Qwest Records on July 13, 1993.

== Critical reception ==
Professional ratings
Review scores
Source	Rating
AllMusic	4/5 stars
Christgau's Consumer Guide	(2-star Honorable Mention)
NME	8/10
Select	3/5
The Source	2.5/5 stars
The Village Voice	A−
Vox	7/10

Jason Ankeny of AllMusic wrote, "The hip-hop debut of Justin Warfield is built around old-school rhythms fleshed out with some intriguing samples, drawn largely from the canon of '60s psychedelic rock." Geoffrey Himes of The Washington Post was more critical, saying, "[Warfield's] raps, with their tired mix of criminal boasting, gratuitous weirdness and hip-hop cliches, leave almost no impression at all."

In 2014, The Village Voice's Jonathan Patrick listed My Field Trip to Planet 9 as one of "The 10 Best Forgotten New York Hip-Hop Records", writing, "Perhaps best labeled as psychedelic rap (mostly on account of its subject matter), My Field Trip to Planet 9 plays out like a hippie's take on golden-era hip-hop". The following year, Fact ranked it as the 43rd-best trip hop album of all time.

== Track listing ==
No.	Title	Length
1.	"Tequila Flats"	0:30
2.	"Introduction by Eliis Dee"	1:01
3.	"Dip Dip Divin'"	3:37
4.	"K Sera Sera"	3:12
5.	"Fisherman's Grotto"	4:07
6.	"Live from the Opium Den"	4:56
7.	"Glass Tangerine"	3:28
8.	"Guavafish Centipede (Aquatic Meditations)"	1:27
9.	"Teenage Caligula"	2:22
10.	"Cool Like the Blues"	4:59
11.	"Drugstore Cowboy"	5:11
12.	"Pick It Up Y'all"	4:31
13.	"B-Boys on Acid"	4:17
14.	"Stormclouds Left of Heaven"	4:01
15.	"Thoughts in the Buttermilk"	4:57
16.	"Tequila Flats (Ghosts of Laurel Canyon)"	0:44

== Personnel ==
Credits adapted from liner notes.

- Justin Warfield – vocals, production, mixing
- QDIII – production, mixing
- Prince Paul – production, mixing
- Ellis Dee – vocals
- Scott Harding – guitar, recording, mixing
- Goffrey Moore – bass guitar
- Michael Blake – saxophone
- Steven Bernstein – trumpet
- Bob Morse – recording, mixing
- Jason Roberts – recording
- Brian Gardner – mastering
- Kevin Kosmann – art direction
- Anne Elliott Cutting – photography
