= Tear You Apart =

Single by She Wants Revenge

from the album She Wants Revenge
- Released: January 10, 2006
- Recorded: 2004
- Studio: Perfect Kiss Studios (Los Angeles)
- Genre: Post-punk revival; gothic rock; dark wave
- Length: 4:45
- Label: Geffen; Perfect Kiss
- Songwriters: Adam Bravin; Justin Warfield
- Producer: She Wants Revenge

She Wants Revenge singles chronology
"These Things" (2005)	"Tear You Apart" (2006)	"Sister" (2006)

Music video
- "Tear You Apart" on YouTube

"Tear You Apart" is a song by American rock band She Wants Revenge. It was released as the second single from their self-titled debut studio album in January 2006 in the U.S. and July 17, 2006 in the UK. The song reached number 6 on the Billboard Alternative Songs chart and number 122 on the Billboard Hot 100.

In 2015, the song was featured in "Checking In" the season premiere of American Horror Story: Hotel, as personally requested by Lady Gaga, one of the show's main actresses. The then-disbanded She Wants Revenge gained a significant revival in popularity as a result of the media usage, and were inspired to reunite as a result.

== Track listing ==
1. "Tear You Apart" – 4:46
2. "Tear You Apart" (Ladytron Mix) – 5:12

== Additional versions ==
- Visitors to DJ and remixer Richard Vission's website could access two exclusive promo remixes by signing up to his email newsletter.
1. "Tear You Apart" (Vission Wants Revenge Vox) – 6:28
2. "Tear You Apart" (Vission Wants Revenge Edit) – 4:26
- Another remix was available for free download from the band's Myspace page.
1. "Tear You Apart" (Hotel Persona Remix) – 5:25 [sometimes referred to as "HP Mix" or "HP Remix"]
- Another remix can be found on the Japanese version of the self-titled album.
1. "Tear You Apart" (Chris Holmes vs. Bystanders Remix) – 4:01

== Appearance in other media ==
- The song was used in the WB TV series One Tree Hill in episode 14 of season 3, "All Tomorrow's Parties".
- The song appeared in The Number 23, a 2007 psychological suspense film directed by Joel Schumacher and starring Jim Carrey and Virginia Madsen. It's set to a scene featuring the characters portrayed by Carrey and Madsen engaging in S&M-style sex shortly after meeting near a fiery vehicle.
- The song was featured in the action scene of Antikiller 3.
- The song was featured in the TV show American Horror Story: Hotel during the season premiere, "Checking In." The scene introduces The Countess Elizabeth Johnson (Lady Gaga) and her lover Donovan (Matt Bomer).
- The song also appeared in a nightclub scene in the TV show Fringe during "Midnight", episode 18 of season 1 in 2009.

== Notes ==
- In the music video, Adam and Justin are mentioned as "missing".
- On the Late Show with David Letterman, along with other TV appearances, the chorus lyrics changed from "I want to fucking tear you apart" to "I'd really love to tear you apart."

== Charts ==
=== Weekly charts ===
Weekly chart performance for "Tear You Apart"
Chart (2006)	Peak position
Scotland Singles (OCC)	81
UK Singles (Official Charts Company)	158
US Bubbling Under Hot 100 (Billboard)	22
US Alternative Airplay (Billboard)	6

=== Year-end charts ===
Year-end chart performance for "Tear You Apart"
Chart (2006)	Position
US Alternative Songs (Billboard)	33

== Certifications ==
Certifications for "Tear You Apart"
Region	Certification	Certified units/sales
United Kingdom (BPI)	Silver	200,000^{‡}
United States (RIAA)	Platinum	1,000,000^{‡}
^{‡} Sales+streaming figures based on certification alone.
