= Into the Dragon =

Studio album by Bomb the Bass
- Released: 1988
- Genre: Dance, house, hip hop
- Length: 36:35
- Label: Rhythm King
- Producer: Tim Simenon

Bomb the Bass chronology
| Into the Dragon (1988) | Unknown Territory (1991) |

Singles from Into the Dragon
- 1. "Beat Dis" Released: 1987; 2. "Megablast / Don't Make Me Wait" Released: 1988; 3. "Say a Little Prayer" Released: 1988

Professional ratings
Review scores
| Source | Rating |
|---|---|
| AllMusic | 4/5 stars |

Into the Dragon is the debut studio album by English musician Bomb the Bass, released on Rhythm King Records in 1988. It first made the UK Albums Chart in October of '88 and peaked at number 18. It features a number of guest vocalists and three singles "Beat Dis", "Megablast/Don't Make Me Wait" and a cover version of "I Say a Little Prayer" featuring Maureen Walsh.

== Track listing ==
| No. | Title | Length |
|---|---|---|
| 1. | "Beat Dis (U.S. 7" Mix)" | 3:24 |
| 2. | "Megablast (Rap Version)" (featuring Merlin) | 6:15 |
| 3. | "On the Cut" | 3:31 |
| 4. | "Don't Make Me Wait" (featuring Lauraine) | 3:44 |
| 5. | "Dynamite Beats" | 0:53 |
| 6. | "Megablast (Hip Hop on Precinct 13)" | 3:40 |
| 7. | "Hey You!" (featuring Aurra) | 3:01 |
| 8. | "Shake It" | 4:33 |
| 9. | "Say a Little Prayer" (featuring Maureen) | 4:30 |
| 10. | "Beat Dat (Freestyle Scratch Mix)" | 2:40 |

2010 reissue version bonus tracks
| No. | Title | Length |
|---|---|---|
| 11. | "Beat Dis (Gangster Boogie Inc. Remix)" | 4:56 |
| 12. | "Don't Make Me Wait (Maximum Frequency Mix)" | 5:40 |
| 13. | "Megablast (Original Rap)" (featuring Merlin) | 5:15 |
| 14. | "Say a Little Prayer (Get Down & Pray Mix)" | 5:10 |

== Charts ==
| Chart (1988–89) | Peak position |
|---|---|
| Australian Albums (ARIA Charts) | 100 |
| UK Albums (OCC) | 18 |
