= Noriko Oda =

Japanese figure skater

Japanese name
- Kanji: 織田 憲子
- Kana: おだ のりこ
Transcriptions
- Romanization: Oda Noriko

Noriko Oda (織田 憲子, Oda Noriko; born May 27, 1947 in Osaka) is a Japanese figure skating coach and former competitor.

She is the mother and coach of Nobunari Oda who both are direct descendants of Oda Nobunaga.
