= Unknown Territory (Bomb the Bass album) =

Studio album by Bomb the Bass
- Released: 1991
- Genre: Dance, house, hip hop
- Length: 72:42
- Label: Rhythm King Records
- Producer: Tim Simenon, Doug Wimbish, Gota

Bomb the Bass chronology
| Into the Dragon (1988) | Unknown Territory (1991) | Clear (1995) |

Singles from Unknown Territory
- 1. "Love So True" Released: 1991; 2. "Winter in July" Released: 1991; 3. "The Air You Breathe" Released: 1991

Unknown Territory is the second studio album by Bomb the Bass, released on Rhythm King Records in 1991. It peaked at number 19 on the UK Albums Chart.

== Production ==
Once again pioneering new sounds in the public arena, and following the success of "Winter in July", Unknown Territory would be the band's most well received release to date. Reviewing the album at the time, music writer and author Simon Reynolds attempted to outline a new genre in the making, suggesting that, by moving beyond mere dance tracks into fully cohesive albums, the band were venturing into "progressive dance".

Interviewed for Sound on Sound magazine in 1995, Simenon agreed with the interviewer when it was suggested that, with this more frenetic side of his work, he was looking to "combine the art of sampling with the energy of rock and roll."

== Track listing ==
| No. | Title | Length |
|---|---|---|
| 1. | "Throughout the Entire World" | 4:38 |
| 2. | "Switching Channels" | 4:49 |
| 3. | "Love So True (Depth Charge Remix)" | 6:11 |
| 4. | "Winter in July (7" Mix)" | 4:32 |
| 5. | "You See Me in 3D Remix" | 4:04 |
| 6. | "Liquid Metal" | 4:19 |
| 7. | "Run Baby Run" | 4:53 |
| 8. | "Dune Buggy Attack 1991" | 3:23 |
| 9. | "Understand This" | 5:11 |
| 10. | "The Air You Breathe" | 6:53 |
| 11. | "Winter in July (Ubiquity Mix)" | 7:15 |
| 12. | "Love So True (12" Mix)" | 6:02 |
| 13. | "Pressure Point" | 5:14 |
| 14. | "Moody" | 5:18 |

== Charts ==
| Chart | Peak position |
|---|---|
| Australian Albums (ARIA Charts) | 172 |
| UK Albums (OCC) | 19 |
