= Brian Gardiner =

Brian Gardiner may refer to:

- Brian G. Gardiner (biologist) (1934–2021), British palaeontologist and zoologist
- Brian G. Gardiner (meteorologist), British meteorologist
- Brian Gardiner (politician) (born 1955), former member of the Canadian House of Commons
