= Future Chaos =

Studio album by Bomb the Bass
- Released: 2008
- Genre: Electronica, electro
- Label: Studio !K7
- Producer: Tim Simenon, Paul Conboy

Bomb the Bass chronology
Clear (1995)	Future Chaos (2008)	Back to Light (2010)

Future Chaos is the fourth studio album from Bomb The Bass, the Electronica collective formed around British producer and musician, Tim Simenon. Released in 2008, (13 years after their third album Clear) the album consists of nine tracks produced almost entirely around the Minimoog synthesizer as the core instrument.

== Track listing ==
No.	Title	Length
1.	"Smog"	5:30
2.	"Butterfingers" (with Fujiya & Miyagi)	5:34
3.	"Old John"	4:32
4.	"Burn The Bunker" (with Toob)	5:25
5.	"So Special"	5:55
6.	"No Bones"	4:57
7.	"Black River" (with Mark Lanegan)	4:14
8.	"Hold Me Up"	4:53
9.	"Fuzzbox" (with Jon Spencer)	5:27

== Personnel ==
- Artwork – Sesper
- Mastered By – Mike Marsh
- Mixed By – Junk Scientist
- Producer – Paul Conboy, Tim Simenon
