= Beat Dis =

Single by Bomb the Bass

from the album Into the Dragon
- Released: 1987
- Genre: House; dance; acid house; hip house
- Length: 6:00 (original 12-inch version); 3:21 (music video version)
- Label: Mister-Ron
- Songwriters: Pascal Gabriel; Tim Simenon
- Producer: Tim Simenon

Bomb the Bass singles chronology
"Beat Dis" (1987)	"Don't Make Me Wait" (1988)

"Beat Dis" is a song by the British musical act Bomb the Bass, a studio production group formed by producer Tim Simenon originally as the Rhythm King All Stars, with producer Pascal Gabriel and Adele Nozedar from Indians in Moscow involved too.

From Bomb the Bass' first album Into the Dragon, the track largely consists of samples, like other hits of the time such as "Pump Up the Volume" by M/A/R/R/S and "Theme from S'Express" by S'Express. The centre label on the record features a smiley lifted from Watchmen. This usage was the origin of the use of the smiley as a symbol for acid house.

"Beat Dis" was first released on Simenon's own Mister-Ron label in 1987. It debuted at number five on the UK Singles Chart on 20 February 1988, and peaked at number two a week later. It was also a hit in Europe, reaching the top 10 in at least five countries, and in New Zealand, where it peaked at number five. It reached number one on the US Billboard Hot Dance Club Play chart for one week and is Bomb the Bass' only chart hit in the US.

== Release ==
"Beat Dis" was pressed on vinyl in the United States and released back into the United Kingdom as an import release.

== Samples used ==
This is an incomplete list of samples used in "Beat Dis". Samples used in different versions may vary.

- Afrika Bambaataa & the Soulsonic Force – "Looking for the Perfect Beat", originally released in 1982 (12"); first LP release on Planet Rock: The Album, 1986
- Bar-Kays – "Son of Shaft" from Son of Shaft, 1971 (7")
- James Brown – "Funky Drummer", originally released in 1971 (7"); first LP release on In the Jungle Groove, 1986
- Dialogue from an episode of the TV series Car 54, Where Are You?
- Opening title sequence of the TV series Dragnet
- EPMD – "It's My Thing", originally released in 1987 (12"); first LP release on Strictly Business, 1988
- Aretha Franklin – "Rock Steady" from Young, Gifted and Black, 1972 (LP)
- Funky 4+1 – "Feel It (The Mexican)" from Feel It (The Mexican), 1983 (12")
- Hashim – "Al-Naafiysh (The Soul)" from Al-Naafiysh (The Soul), 1983 (EP)
- Indeep – "Last Night a DJ Saved My Life" from Last Night a D.J. Saved My Life!, 1982 (LP)
- Jimmy Castor Bunch – "It's Just Begun" from It's Just Begun, 1972 (LP)
- Kurtis Blow – "Christmas Rappin'" from Kurtis Blow, 1980 (LP)
- Line from a radio broadcast by Fiorello H. La Guardia
- Jayne Mansfield – "That Makes It" from Jayne Mansfield Busts Up Las Vegas, 1962 (LP)
- Theme from the 1966 film The Good, the Bad and the Ugly, composed by Ennio Morricone
- Original Concept – "Pump That Bass" from Bite'n My Stylee, 1986 (12")
- Prince – "Housequake" from Sign “☮” the Times, 1987 (LP)
- Public Enemy – "Rebel Without a Pause" from It Takes a Nation of Millions to Hold Us Back, 1987 (LP; portion originally sampled from "The Grunt" by The J.B.'s and "Funky Drummer" by James Brown)
- "Russian Roulette" from Stereo Spectacular: Demonstration & Sound Effects, 1963 (LP)
- Schoolly D – "Saturday Night" from Saturday Night! - The Album, 1986 (LP)
- Frankie Smith – "Double Dutch Bus" from Children of Tomorrow, 1981 (LP)
- Opening title sequence of the TV series Thunderbirds
- "Train Sequence", narrated by Geoffrey Sumner from A Journey Into Stereo Sound, 1958 (LP)
- Trouble Funk – "Double Trouble" from Saturday Night Live! From Washington D.C., 1983 (LP)
- Fred Wesley and The J.B.'s – "Blow Your Head" from Damn Right I Am Somebody, 1974 (LP)

== Charts ==
=== Weekly charts ===
Chart (1988)	Peak position
Austria (Ö3 Austria Top 40)	3
Belgium (Ultratop 50 Flanders)	10
Canada Dance/Urban (RPM)	4
Europe (Eurochart Hot 100)	6
Ireland (IRMA)	4
Israel (IBA)	2
Netherlands (Dutch Top 40)	13
Netherlands (Single Top 100)	8
New Zealand (Recorded Music NZ)	5
Spain (AFYVE)	13
Switzerland (Schweizer Hitparade)	4
UK Singles (Official Charts)	2
US 12-inch Singles Sales (Billboard)	27
US Dance Club Play (Billboard)	1
West Germany (GfK)	6

=== Year-end charts ===
Chart (1988)	Position
Austria (Ö3 Austria Top 40)	15
Canada Dance/Urban (RPM)	20
Europe (Eurochart Hot 100)	54
Switzerland (Schweizer Hitparade)	29
UK Singles (OCC)	30
West Germany (Media Control)	48

== Certifications ==
Region	Certification	Certified units/sales
United Kingdom (BPI)	Silver	250,000^{^}
^{^} Shipments figures based on certification alone.
