= Justin Warfield =

American musician and hip hop MC (born 1973)

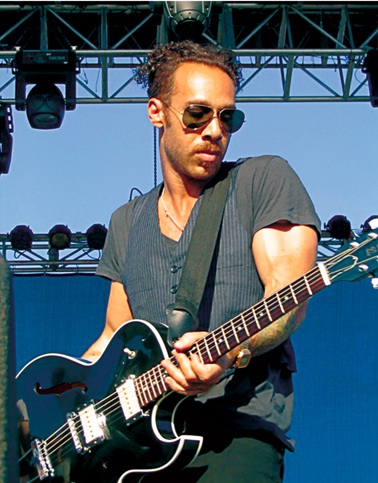
- Justin Warfield - Live in Concert

Background information
- Born: Justin Evan Warfield; April 20, 1973 (age 53)
- Genres: Alternative rock; hip hop; post-punk revival
- Occupation: Musician
- Instruments: Vocals, guitar, keyboards
- Years active: 1989–present
- Labels: Qwest/Reprise/Warner Bros. Records, Downwrite, Cleopatra Records

Justin Evan Warfield (born April 20, 1973) is an American musician and hip hop MC. He is the lead vocalist, guitarist and keyboardist of the post-punk revival duo She Wants Revenge, which formed in 2004.

In 1993, he released a hip-hop album titled My Field Trip to Planet 9, which featured production from Prince Paul and QDIII. His latest hip hop album, the self-released Black Hesh Cult Mixtape, was released in July 2013.

Warfield was the featured vocalist on Bomb the Bass' song "Bug Powder Dust", which reached No. 24 on the UK Singles Chart in 1994.

In 2025, he announced a new project under the artist name Warfield, which will release its debut EP on Cleopatra Records.

== Career ==
Justin Warfield is musically versatile, having been involved in several different genres over the years, and seems to choose his projects based on personal interest rather than career concerns. For example, his debut album was hip hop, but his next major musical project was a psychedelic rock band that released one album, The Justin Warfield Supernaut. In 1991, he had a hit single with the song "Season of the Vic," which reached No. 18 on the Billboard Hot Rap Singles chart.

He was a member of the group One Inch Punch, which released its only LP, Tao of the One Inch Punch, on Hut Records in 1996. Warfield is one half of the post-punk revival duo She Wants Revenge, a project different again from any of his previous incarnations. It is heavily influenced by bands such as Joy Division, New Order, Bauhaus, and Depeche Mode to more contemporary groups such as Interpol, and the Faint, cultivating a stylized visual identity in a contemporary analogue to Depeche Mode and the Cure.

His most commercially recognizable track is probably "Bug Powder Dust," in which he was the vocalist on a Bomb the Bass release, and he was also featured on another track on its album, Clear. He also appeared as a guest vocalist on the Placebo song "Spite & Malice" from the album Black Market Music, the Cornershop song "Candyman" from the album When I Was Born for the 7th Time, the Crystal Method song "Kling to the Wreckage" on the album, Divided by Night, the Chemical Brothers' "Not Another Drugstore" from the single "Elektrobank", and the Freestylers's "Broadcast Channels" from the album, Pressure Point. Additionally, he has done remix work including a remix of "Joel" by the Boo Radleys from its 1995 single "It's Lulu", a remix of "Confide In Me" by Kylie Minogue in 1994 and "Butterfly" by Crazy Town.

Warfield was on several episodes of Saved by the Bell.

== Personal life ==
Warfield is of African-American and Jewish Russian-Romanian maternal parentage. He is married to Stefanie King and they have one son.

== Discography ==
Solo studio albums
Album title	Album details
My Field Trip to Planet 9	Released: July 13, 1993; Label: Qwest/Reprise/Warner Bros.; Format: CD
Black Hesh Cult Mixtape	Released: August 8, 2013; Label: Self-Released; Format: CD/download

The Justin Warfield Supernaut
Album title	Album details
The Justin Warfield Supernaut	Released: June 28, 1995; Label: Qwest/Reprise/Warner Bros.

List of studio albums as part of She Wants Revenge, with selected chart positions
Title	Album details	Peak chart positions				
Title	Album details	US	US Alt	US Dance	US Indie	US Rock
She Wants Revenge	Released: January 31, 2006; Label: Perfect Kiss/Geffen/Universal	38	—	3	—	9
This Is Forever	Released: October 9, 2007; Label: Perfect Kiss/Geffen/Universal	58	14	—	—	18
Valleyheart	Released: May 24, 2011; Label: Five Seven Music	153	19	—	23	37
"—" denotes a recording that did not chart or was not released in that territory.
