= Bug Powder Dust =

1994 single by Bomb the Bass

Single by Bomb the Bass featuring Justin Warfield

from the album Clear
- Released: 19 September 1994
- Genre: Hip hop
- Length: 4:18
- Label: 4th & Broadway; Stoned Heights
- Songwriters: Tim Simenon; Justin Warfield
- Producer: Tim Simenon

Bomb the Bass singles chronology
| "Keep Giving Me Love" (1992) | "Bug Powder Dust" (1994) | "Darkheart" (1994) |

"Bug Powder Dust" is a song by English musician Bomb the Bass featuring the vocals of Justin Warfield, released on 19 September 1994 as the first single from Bomb the Bass's third album, Clear (1995).

== Chart performance ==
"Bug Powder Dust" reached number 24 on the UK Singles Chart and was voted Select magazine's single of the year in 1994. It also charted in Australia, peaking at number 34 on the ARIA Singles Chart in February 1995.

== Music video ==
The accompanying music video for "Bug Powder Dust" was directed by British-born American actor and filmmaker Alex Winter and produced by Larry Perel for Propaganda. It was released on 12 September 1994 and is an Apocalypse Now journey up river in Belize.

== Charts ==
| Chart (1994–1995) | Peak position |
|---|---|
| Australia (ARIA) | 34 |
| Europe (Eurochart Hot 100) | 78 |
| Scotland Singles (OCC) | 26 |
| UK Singles (OCC) | 24 |
| UK Dance (OCC) | 6 |
| UK Club Chart (Music Week) | 45 |

== Release history ==
| Region | Date | Format(s) | Label(s) | Ref. |
|---|---|---|---|---|
| United Kingdom | 19 September 1994 | 12-inch vinyl; CD1; cassette | 4th & Broadway; Stoned Heights | |
| United Kingdom | 26 September 1994 | CD2 | 4th & Broadway; Stoned Heights | |
| Australia | 24 October 1994 | CD; cassette | 4th & Broadway; Stoned Heights; Island | |
