= Poison Girl Friend =

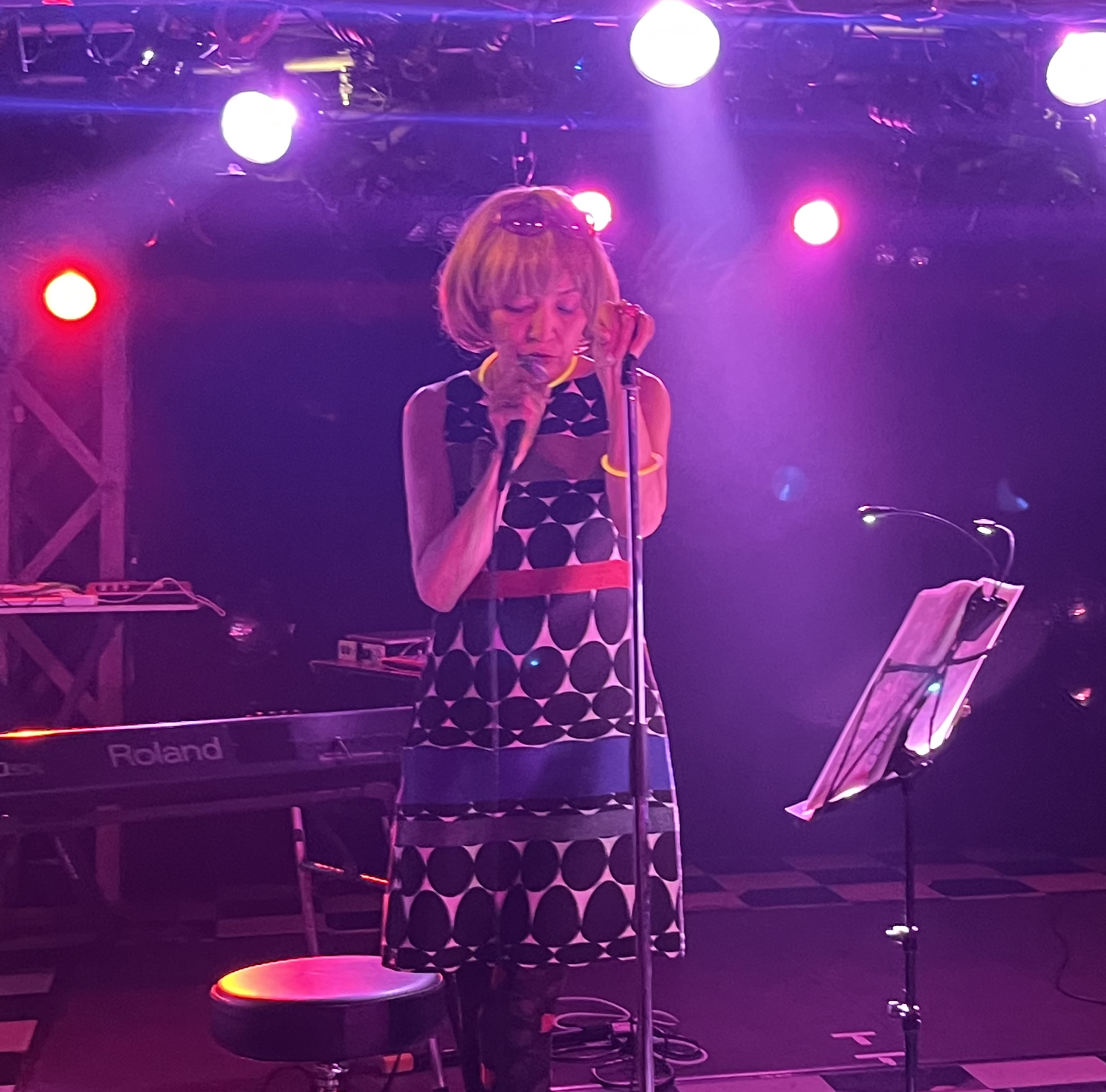

Background information
- Also known as: POiSON GiRL FRiEND, nOrikO
- Born: Yokohama
- Origin: Tokyo, Japan
- Genres: dream pop; synth-pop; trip hop; ambient house
- Years active: 1991–present
- Website: psychopla.net

Poison Girl Friend, stylized as POiSON GiRL FRiEND, is a solo music project by Noriko Sekiguchi. A singer, songwriter, composer, producer and DJ based mainly in Japan, Noriko formed The Poison Girl Friends in 1990 with her friends. However, by the end of 1991, Noriko began releasing music herself under the name Poison Girl Friend, which she has used as an alias ever since.

== Early life ==
Noriko Sekiguchi was born in Yokohama, Japan. Due to her father's career as a banker, Sekiguchi lived in Rio de Janeiro for three years in the 1970s. She also lived in the UK around the '80s and '90s, where she "was infatuated by" London's club music scene.

== Career ==
In the 1990s, POiSON GiRL FRiEND began her career as a Club DJ in Tokyo. In 1991, she self-produced her first mini-album POiSON GiRL FRiENDS with her own independent label, Psycho Planet Communications.

In 1992, Melting Moment, her first major-label album as Poison Girl Friend, was released on Victor Entertainment (Endorphin). "Hardly Ever Smile (Without You)", the first track on the album, has become her signature piece since, featuring a marriage of electric ambient house style and a texture of classical strings arranged by Neko Saito and performed by his strings quartet.

In 1993 and 1994, POiSON GiRL FRiEND released three albums on Nippon Columbia. The year 1993 saw the releases of Shyness and Mr. Polyglot Remix, recorded in London and produced by Momus, whose second album The Poison Boyfriend had inspired Noriko to baptise her unit POiSON GiRL FRiEND. With these albums for which she collaborated closely with Momus and Simon Fisher Turner, she is often classified as a Shibuya-kei musician. In Mr. Polyglot Remix, she continued the exploration of the acoustic sound with the Balanescu Quartet. The subsequent album on Nippon Columbia Love Me (released in 1994) showed more French taste with songs titled in French, giving allusion to French cultural elements or covering French pop songs.

In 1993, she released under the name "Dark Eyed Kid" a compilation Angelic House - Ambient Love Collection on the label Spiral. In the years that flowed she released, as dance music unit Kiss-O-Matic, circularhythm (1996), Sambanista! (1997), and St. Angélique (1997), on her own label Psycho Planet.

In 2014, POiSON GiRL FRiEND released rondoElectro, her first album in 20 years under the name of POiSON GiRL FRiEND on her own label Psycho Planet Communications The album Das Gift was released in 2018 on Nekon Records, featuring a diverse range of Japanese musicians active in the electro genre.

In 2021, the two major labels, Victor Entertainment and Nippon Columbia, started to allow the distribution of her old albums through several download and streaming service platforms. That led to the rediscovery and reappraisal of the POiSON GiRL FRiEND. A compilation of her music titled COLLECTiON was compiled and released in December 2022 by Los Angeles based record label 7th Heaven. The year 2023 saw the release of two vinyl albums: Melting Moment (on Sad dicco in June), the vinyl edition of her 1991 album, and exQuisxx (on Nippon Columbia - HMV Record Shop in November), a compilation of her three albums from the Nippon Columbia years. In September 2023, Sega Bodega's project with Mayah Alkhateri, Kiss Facility released So Many Ways, in which she participated as featured artist. In December 30, she gave a full concert in Shanghai.

In 2024, POiSON GiRL FRiEND embarked on her first U.S. tour, performing ten shows across eight American cities from October to November. The tour included stops in Seattle (The Crocodile), Portland (The Star Theater), Los Angeles (Vermont Hollywood and The Novo), San Francisco (Great American Music Hall), Washington, D.C. (Union Stage), New York (Elsewhere and Sony Hall), and Chicago (Lincoln Hall).

As a DJ, Noriko appears in several venues in Tokyo and hosts her own events. Since October 2023, she works as a resident host DJ on NTS Radio.

== Discography ==
Discography established from the data on record companies official sites, the artist's official site and Discogs.

Extended plays as Poison Girl Friend

- Poison Girl Friends (Psycho Planet, 1991)
- Melting Moment (Victor & Endorphin, 1992)
- Mr. Polyglot Remix (Nippon Columbia, 1993)
- Reprises (Psycho Planet, 2026)

Studio albums as Poison Girl Friend

- Shyness (Nippon Columbia, 1993)
- Love Me (Nippon Columbia, 1994)
- rondoElectro (Psycho Planet, 2014)
- Das Gift (Nekon Records, 2018)

Singles as Poison Girl Friend

- Hardly Ever Smile (Without You) (Nippon Columbia, 1992)
- Mr. Polyglot (Nippon Columbia, 1993)
- Paradise (Nekon Records, 2017)
- The October Country (Psycho Planet, 2024)
- Un espoir pour… (Psycho Planet, 2026)

As Dark Eyed Kid

- Angelic House: Ambient Love Collection (Spiral, 1993)

As Kiss-O-Matic

- Circularhythm (Psycho Planet, 1996)
- Sambanista! (Psycho Planet, 1997)
- St. Angélique (Psycho Planet, 1997)
- Make a Miracle (DJ Shinkawa'ssss Remix) from Sambanista! by DJ Shinkawa (Psycho Planet, 12-inch vinyl, 1997)

Featured In

- Hysteric Ball Room Vol.2 (as Dark Eyed Kid, DJ: & Toshiba EMI, 1993)
- Les jours de vacances en Provence: (as Noriko, Portazul, 1994)
- Tribute to New Wave (as PGF, for the independent magazine "Megabank", 1995)
- Taste of Sweet Love: Masterpiece 1969-79: Heidi 5 (Trycle, 1997)
- ロックリバー (Petty Booka from Kentucky & Poison Girl Friend, Trycle, 1997)
- Voice from Tokio / Manufacture United (Hoarfrost & as Noriko, Manufacture Recordings, 2000)
- Electric Tones: Jukebox (as Noriko, Electric Tones, 2000)
- Swell (Sigh Society & as Noriko, Nekon Records, 2015)
- Hub Compilation Album (Kaz Mashino & Poison Girl Friend, Nekon Records, 2016)
- Bleu comme l'amour (Candy Collection & Poison Girl Friend, Single, 24P, 2021)
- So Many Ways (Kiss Facility & Poison Girl Friend, Single, Kiss Facility & Supernature, 2023)
- Reality (Sigh Society & Poison Girl Friend, Single, 2023)
- Mercury Fountain (Gaul Plus & Poison Girl Friend, Single, Rank+File, 2025)
- Fold (Jump Source & Poison Girl Friend, Naff & C Stands for C, 2026)

Reissues and compilations as Poison Girl Friend

- Collection (7th Heaven, 2022, Cassette, Limited edition)
- Melting Moment (Sad Disco & Endorphin, 2023, Vinyl LP & CD)
- exQuisxx (Nippon Columbia, 2023, Vinyl LP, Compilation, Limited edition)
- Shyness (Nipponophone, 2025, Vinyl LP, cassette & CD)
- Love Me (Nipponophone, 2025, Vinyl LP, cassette & CD)
- Poison Girl Friends (Victor Entertainment, Inc., 2026, Vinyl LP & digipak CD)
