= Bomb the Bass =

English electronic music project

- Simenon in 2008

Background information
- Born: June 1967 (age 59)
- Origin: London, England
- Genres: Electronic; hip-hop; downtempo; trip hop
- Years active: 1987–2013
- Labels: !K7; Mister-Ron; Rhythm King; Electric Tones; Stoned Heights; Island

Bomb the Bass is an electronic music alias of English musician and producer Timothy Simenon (born June 1967).

As a name, Bomb the Bass came from Simenon's approach to collaging and mixing sounds whilst DJing in the mid- to late 1980s; he says "samples were either scratched in live or sampled and looped on top of the rhythm section. So the concept was one of bombing the bass line with different ideas, with a collage of sounds. Bombing was a graffiti term for writing, like people would 'bomb' trains or whatever."

== History ==
Bomb the Bass had originally started out as the Rhythm King All Stars, a project which would see the back catalogue of Rhythm King Records mixed into a 12 inch medley for the clubs, by producers Tim Simenon (a housemate of label founder James Horrocks) and Pascal Gabriel. However, as the back catalogue of the company was at that point small, the duo used a number of other records and samples from other companies, with the record evolving into "Beat Dis". Simenon then decided to change the name of the project from the Rhythm King All Stars to Bomb the Bass, with Simenon and Gabriel using the names DJ Kid 33 and Emilio Pasquez to give the impression that the record was an American import. When the record was released by Rhythm King records in the UK (on their Mister-Ron sublabel) it debuted at number five and peaked a week later at number two on the chart of 21 to 27 February 1988, giving Bomb the Bass the chance to appear on Top of the Pops (in a performance that also included Adele Nozedar from Indians in Moscow, who was working for the record company at the time).

=== Pushing the needle: The accelerated success of "Beat Dis" ===
While the bass line and drum tracks of "Beat Dis" were written by Simenon, the rest of the track was compiled from samples. Having already taken a part-time sound course at the School of Audio Engineering in Holloway, Simenon was able to build "Beat Dis" himself - assisted in the process by producer Pascal Gabriel, who went on to experience his own success as co-producer of S'Express and a wide variety of other artists.

According to the BBC, which featured "Beat Dis" on their clip-based TOTP2 show, the track contains an alleged 72 samples, including lifts from hip hop like Public Enemy, funk (including The Jimmy Castor Bunch), and Ennio Morricone. Also featured were dialogue clips from the television shows Dragnet and Thunderbirds. Talking to Sound on Sound magazine many years later, Simenon said of the track's construction: "I suppose I was tuned in to what was current at the time and was able to pick and choose what I wanted with some knowledge of how it should be applied."

He co-produced Neneh Cherry's "Buffalo Stance" after a chance encounter with Jamie Morgan of band Morgan-McVey in London nightclub The Wag, where Simenon was doing a DJ set including the track's first incarnation, a Morgan-McVey B-side called "Looking Good Diving With The Wild Bunch." Simenon expressed interest in reworking the track, before alerting Morgan to the approach of a crazed stalker who was trying to kill him. Morgan informed Cherry's record company of Simenon's interest in the track, and a deal was struck for him to produce what became "Buffalo Stance".

Along with Trevor Horn, he co-produced "Krazy", a remix of the song "Crazy" by Seal.

=== Computer Games: Xenon 2 Megablast ===
The Bitmap Brothers collaborated with Tim Simenon to include the 1988 Bomb the Bass hip hop track "Megablast (Hip Hop on Precinct 13)" as theme music for the video game Xenon 2 Megablast, which is also the origin of the game's subtitle. In turn, this song uses samples from Sly and the Family Stone song, "You Can Make It If You Try", and its theme seems heavily inspired by The Splash Band track "The End (Disco Version)" released in 1984, which is itself based on the theme of John Carpenter's film Assault on Precinct 13.

There are two versions of the track in the game: a nearly faithful rendition (only missing a few spoken lines) as the loading music, and a simplified version as the in-game background music. The Amiga version of the loading music is based on the same track, but significantly different, with such changes as helicopter sound effects at the beginning and end. The Atari ST version used a complete looping sample from the song.

The game was one of the first instances of a computer being programmed to play a pop single with reasonable accuracy. Sections of the music were sampled and then re-sequenced (by computer game musician David Whittaker). In the cartridge-based console versions, the music is radically simplified, being purely synthesised and lacking the voice samples of the computer versions.

=== Into Unknown Territory ===
In February 1991, the first single from Bomb the Bass' new album Unknown Territory, "Love So True" was released with vocals from Loretta Heywood. It suffered under hastily imposed (and unofficial) censorship broadcast regulations, as the outbreak of the First Gulf War prompted UK broadcasters, especially the main national music station BBC Radio 1, to blacklist a variety of songs and acts deemed potentially controversial due to their content or titles. The band name Bomb the Bass was considered to fall into this category, along with that of Massive Attack, and so the record had to be released under Simenon's own name, making it chart low in the United Kingdom at number 84.

Following the success of "Winter in July", Unknown Territory was the band's most well received release to date. Reviewing the album at the time, music writer and author Simon Reynolds attempted to outline a new genre in the making, suggesting that, by moving beyond mere dance tracks into fully cohesive albums, the band were venturing into progressive dance.

=== Break from the beat: Bomb the Bass as production outfit ===
In the mid 1990s, Simenon signed Bomb the Bass and his Stoned Heights imprint to Island Records' dance and hip-hop label 4th & B'way Records. This partnership saw the 1995 album Clear reach the UK albums chart and the Justin Warfield featuring single "Bug Powder Dust" reach number 24 in the UK singles chart

Interviewed for Sound on Sound magazine in 1995, Simenon agreed with the interviewer when it was suggested that, with this more frenetic side of his work, he was looking to "combine the art of sampling with the energy of rock and roll."

Another record released by Island in 1995 was Gavin Friday's Shag Tobacco, which Simenon produced and which spawned the track "Angel" (which found its way onto the hugely successful soundtrack of the Romeo + Juliet movie). This album caught the attention of Dave Gahan and Martin Gore of Depeche Mode, who were on the look out for a new producer. Gahan said, "There was loads of names being thrown at us (to produce Depeche Mode's next album after Songs of Faith and Devotion), but in the end we picked (Simenon) because Martin (Gore) and I really liked the Gavin Friday album that he did. Shag Tobacco is an absolutely brilliant album, (and) we really loved the sounds he produced".

The resulting album, Ultra, was released in April 1997. Quoted in the biography, Depeche Mode: Black Celebration by Steve Malins, Simenon confessed, "I just felt fucked by the end of the recording, and I carried on working in January and February 1997, which was the worst thing I could have done. I started to feel really ill. So I took a break and had a few months off. I was just mentally and physically exhausted".

The work in question, which took the form of recording sessions with Jack Dangers from Meat Beat Manifesto, did not surface for many years, leaving a further single with Depeche Mode, "Only When I Lose Myself" as the last major Simenon outing for many years: "It'd been non-stop for more than 10 years, and I was just burnt out. It all just caught up, and took its toll; just left me feeling very, very uninspired".

=== 1990s become 2000s, become Electric Tones ===
The Tracks EP was recorded in collaboration with Jack Dangers, from Meat Beat Manifesto, and the first actual Bomb the Bass material to be released via Electric Tones. With all tracks co-credited to Bomb the Bass & Jack Dangers, the recording sessions were listed as having taken place years earlier, in 1998.

=== Future Chaos: Bomb the Bass in the 21st century ===
It was originally thought that "Butterfingers" (featuring Fujiya & Miyagi) would be the first single released from Future Chaos, as an animated short film for the track surfaced on YouTube in March 2008. The clip, which was produced by Perish Factory visualises the new minimal sound of the band by featuring an animated Minimoog - as used on the track.

Reviewing "Butterfingers", Daily Music Guide described it as showing "the new Bomb the Bass plug straight into a place where scuffed Formica is sexier than leather, and red LED is the font of all knowledge. Having worked through all those zeroes and ones only to come up wanting, Bomb the Bass have seemingly gone back to come forwards once again, with the result being a track that easily lives up to the sum of its parts."

Bomb the Bass confirmed they would perform their first London gig in almost 20 years, at the London Astoria on 4 June 2008; and are also billed as appearing at the UK dance music festival, The Big Chill, on 2 August 2008, in Ledbury, Herefordshire and the Zürich festival, Lethargy '08.

In an online interview with Tim Simenon in May 2008, it was remarked that Future Chaos was to be released in August 2008. In the same interview, Simenon commented that the album had taken so long to complete partly because he had wanted to change direction, to take on a more simplistic, less cluttered feel - necessitating a restart and re-record.

=== Back to the racks, Back to Light: BTB from 2009–2010 ===
In September 2009, using Twitter, Simenon revealed that work was almost complete on the follow-up to Future Chaos. Around the same time and also via Twitter, Jakeone of Toob announced he had just completed remix duties on a new track called The Infinites. Back to Light was released in March 2010.

=== Touring, In the Sun, Mega Dis and break-up ===
Bomb the Bass spent most of 2011 and 2012 touring and recording their next album with drummer Christian Eigner. In 2012, the official BTB online shop was opened, with instrumental versions of "Future Chaos" and "Back to Light" being made available to purchase, along with a compilation album Rare and Unreleased. The new album In the Sun was released in May 2013 on Simenon's own label O*Solo Recordings. The band celebrated their 25th anniversary by releasing a mega mix Mega Dis as a digital single in October 2013.

After that, Tim Simenon went to form a short lived band Ghost Capsules. Since the release of In the Sun, Bomb the Bass quietly dissolved. Simenon relocated to Prague and went for other ventures. He has opened restaurants including Hoxton Burgers and Megablast. In 2020, he confirmed that he has finished working in the music industry.

In 2005, Tim Simenon was charged and subsequently cleared of rape and sexual assault at Snaresbrook Crown Court, London.

== Discography ==
=== Studio albums ===
Year	Album	Label	UK	AUS	Certifications
1988	Into the Dragon	Rhythm King Records	18	—	BPI: Gold
1991	Unknown Territory	Rhythm King Records	19	172	
1995	Clear	Fourth and Broadway	22	122	
2008	Future Chaos	!K7 / Electric Tones	—	—	
2010	Back to Light	!K7 / Electric Tones	—	—	
2013	In the Sun	O*Solo Recordings	—	—	
"—" denotes releases that did not chart.

=== Compilation albums ===
- The CD Singles (Rhythm King Records, 1989)
- Beat Dis – The Very Best of Bomb the Bass (Camden, 1999)

=== EPs ===
- Clear Cut (Morr Music, 2001) (with Lali Puna)
- Tracks (Electric Tones, 2001) (with Jack Dangers)
- Mega Dis (O*Solo Recordings, 2013)

=== Singles ===
Year	Single	Peak positions											Certifications	Album
Year	Single	UK	IRE	NED	BEL (FLA)	GER	AUT	SWI	SWE	AUS	NZ	US Dance	Certifications	Album
1988	"Beat Dis"	2	4	8	10	6	3	4	—	—	5	1	BPI: Silver	Into the Dragon
1988	"Megablast/Don't Make Me Wait"	6	12	29	—	33	—	19	—	—	19	—		Into the Dragon
1988	"Say a Little Prayer" (feat. Maureen)	10	11	9	18	—	—	—	—	54	21	—		Into the Dragon
1991	"Love So True" (credited to Tim Simenon)	84	—	—	—	—	—	—	—	—	—	—		Unknown Territory
1991	"Winter in July"	7	21	6	37	39	—	21	32	174	—	—		Unknown Territory
1991	"The Air You Breathe"	52	—	54	—	—	—	—	—	162	—	—		Unknown Territory
1992	"Keep Giving Me Love" (a re-recording of "Love So True")	62	—	—	—	—	—	—	—	—	—	—		Single only
1994	"Bug Powder Dust" (feat. Justin Warfield)	24	—	—	—	—	—	—	—	34	—	—		Clear
1994	"Darkheart" (feat. Spikey Tee)	35	—	—	—	—	—	—	—	95	—	—		Clear
1995	"1 to 1 Religion" (feat. Carlton)	53	—	—	—	—	—	—	—	—	—	—		Clear
1995	"Sandcastles"	54	—	—	—	—	—	—	—	—	—	—		Clear
2001	"Clear Cut" (feat. Lali Puna)	—	—	—	—	—	—	—	—	—	—	—		Singles only
2001	"Tracks"	—	—	—	—	—	—	—	—	—	—	—		Singles only
2008	"Butterfingers" (feat. Fujiya & Miyagi)	—	—	—	—	—	—	—	—	—	—	—		Future Chaos
"—" denotes releases that did not chart or were not released.

== See also ==
- List of artists who reached number one on the U.S. Dance Club Songs chart
