= Adam Bravin =

American musician, visual artist and producer

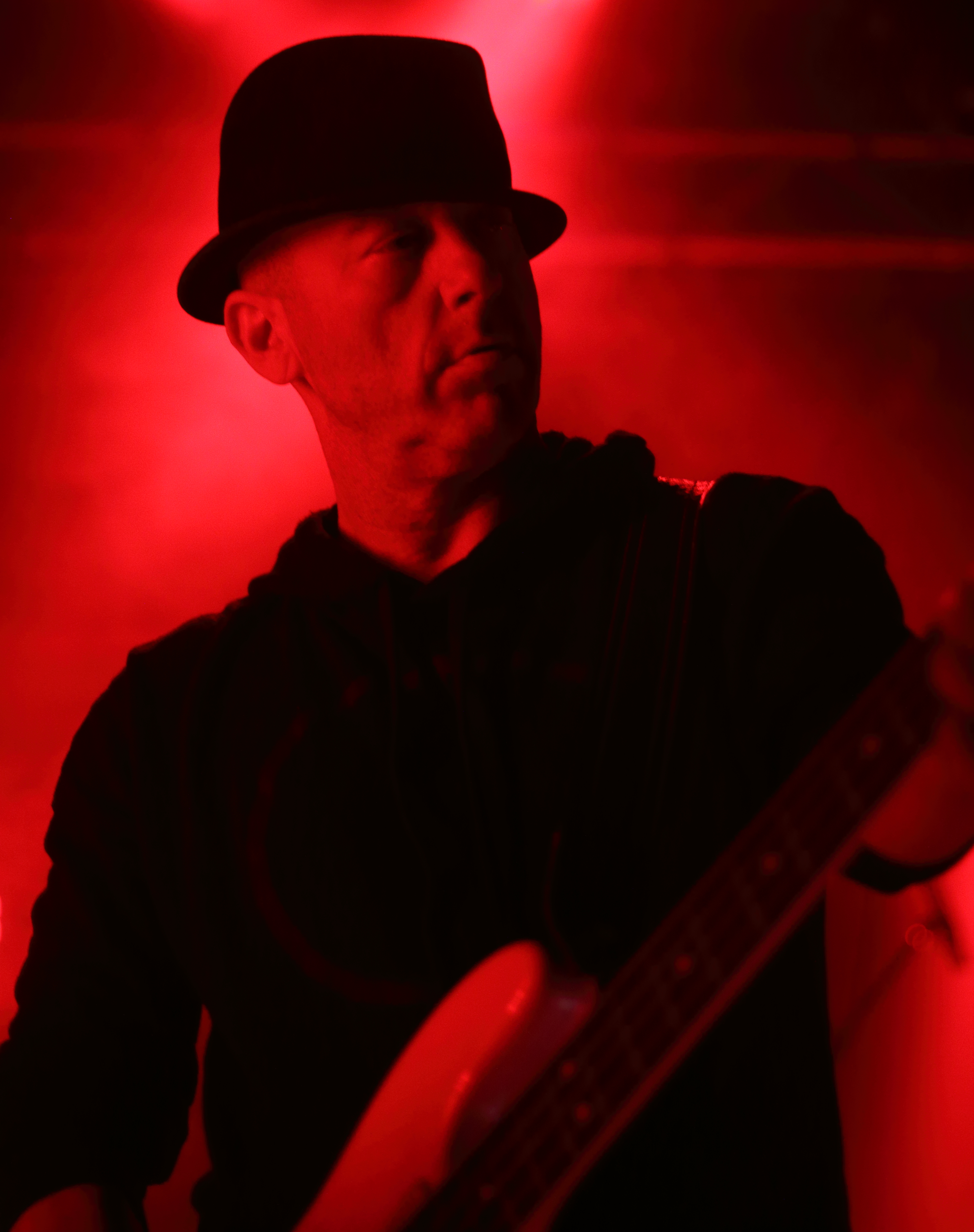
- Bravin in 2019

Background information
- Origin: Los Angeles, California, U.S.
- Genres: Alternative rock; gothic rock
- Years active: 1995–present
- Partner: Ivy Levan

Adam Michael Bravin, also known as DJ Adam 12, is an American musician, visual artist and producer who is one half of the darkwave duo She Wants Revenge. He was a member of the Brimstone Sluggers from 1995–1996, who later became known as Crazy Town. Bravin has his own solo project, Love Ecstasy Terror and works as a producer and film composer. He has also been the personal DJ for former president Barack Obama.

== Biography ==
Bravin grew up with his parents listening to artists such as Stevie Wonder, the Beatles, and Led Zeppelin. He began DJing at the age of 16, primarily at local house parties in San Fernando Valley. After a few years of spinning, Bravin began attending an LA nightclub owned by Prince. After about a year, Bravin was hired by Prince to DJ at the club. Bravin plays bass guitar, keyboards, guitar, drum machine, and percussion, in addition to programming and vocals as well as video production.

== Controversy ==
In 2015, alongside his friend and business partner Michael Patterson, Bravin created the goth-oriented club Cloak & Dagger, where he acted as creative director and DJ. The club operated on Tuesdays at the Pig 'n Whistle in Los Angeles.

In June 2020, the club was closed due to the COVID-19 pandemic. Following the closure, Bravin and Patterson faced allegations of misconduct and discriminatory treatment during a Zoom town hall meeting intended to support the community during the Black Lives Matter movement and the pandemic. The LA Times reported multiple allegations from women, including former employees, who claimed that the club's management mishandled reports of misconduct. Bravin acknowledged that his behavior could have been inappropriate and stated he was educating himself on the impact of his actions. No charges or legal actions were pursued against the partners or the club. Subsequently, the club announced its permanent closure and deleted its social media content.
