= Ladyhawke discography =

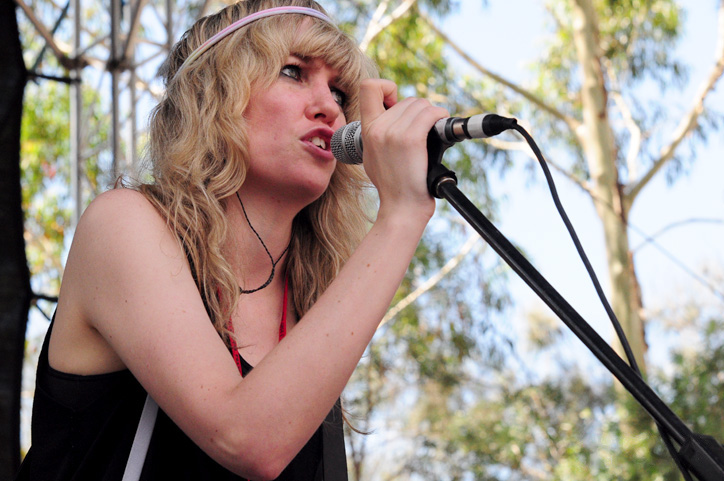
- Ladyhawke performing in 2008
- Studio albums: 4
- Extended plays: 2
- Singles: 18
- Music videos: 8
- Other appearances: 5

The discography of Ladyhawke, a New Zealand electropop singer-songwriter, consists of four studio albums, two extended plays and eighteen singles. Ladyhawke began her career in 2001 as the guitarist for the hard rock band Two Lane Blacktop. The group disbanded in 2003 and she then joined the pop-rock band Teenager.

Her self-titled solo debut studio album was released in September 2008. The album reached number one in New Zealand and number 16 in Australia and the United Kingdom – it was certified platinum by Recorded Music NZ (RMNZ) and gold by the Australian Recording Industry Association (ARIA) and the British Phonographic Industry (BPI). Five singles, "Back of the Van", "Paris Is Burning", "Dusk Till Dawn", "My Delirium" and "Magic", were released from the album: "My Delirium" peaked within the top ten in Australia and New Zealand.

Ladyhawke worked extensively with producer Pascal Gabriel in recording her second studio album, Anxiety, which was released in May 2012. The album peaked at number 12 in New Zealand and on the United States Billboard Top Heatseekers chart. Three singles were released from the album: "Black White & Blue", "Sunday Drive" and "Blue Eyes", with "Black White & Blue" charting at number 32 on the Ultratip chart in the Flanders region of Belgium.

Ladyhawke's third album Wild Things was released 3 June 2016 and was primarily produced by Tommy English. Two singles were released from Wild Things, "A Love Song" and "Wild Things".

Ladyhawke's fourth album, Time Flies was released on 19 November 2021. Four singles were released from the album: "Guilty Love", which is a collaboration with New Zealand indie pop act Broods, "Mixed Emotions", "Think About You" and "My Love".

== Studio albums ==
List of studio albums, with selected chart positions and certifications
Title	Details	Peak chart positions								Certifications
Title	Details	NZ	AUS	BEL (FL)	EU	SCO	UK	UK Indie	US Heat	Certifications
Ladyhawke	Released: 20 September 2008 (NZ); Label: Modular (MODCD093); Formats: CD, LP, DD	1	16	—	62	14	16	—	41	RMNZ: Platinum; ARIA: Gold; BPI: Gold
Anxiety	Released: 25 May 2012 (NZ); Label: Modular (MODCD155); Formats: CD, LP, DD	12	17	134	—	53	36	—	12	
Wild Things	Released: 3 June 2016; Label: Polyvinyl; Formats: CD, LP, DD	5	19	—	—	38	57	7	15	
Time Flies	Released: 19 November 2021; Label: Mid Century; Formats: CD, DD, streaming	—	—	—	—	100	— (Note: Time Flies did not enter the UK Albums Chart, but peaked at number 100 on the UK Album Sales Chart.)	31	—	
"—" denotes items which were not released in that country or failed to chart.

== Extended plays ==
List of extended plays
Title	Details
Ladyhawke – EP	Released: 10 April 2009 (NZ); Label: Modular; Format: DD
iTunes Live from SoHo	Released: 4 May 2010 (NZ); Label: Modular; Format: DD

== Singles ==
List of singles, with selected chart positions, showing year released and album name
Title	Year	Peak chart positions										Certifications	Album
Title	Year	NZ	AUS	BEL (FL) Tip	BEL (WA) Tip	DEN	EU	POL	SCO	UK	US Dance	Certifications	Album
"Back of the Van"	2008	—	—	—	—	—	—	—	—	93	—		Ladyhawke
"Paris Is Burning"	2008	40	52	5	—	—	—	—	29	47	33		Ladyhawke
"Dusk Till Dawn"	2008	—	—	—	—	—	—	—	25	78	—		Ladyhawke
"My Delirium"	2008	9	8	10	—	36	92	38	41	33	—	RMNZ: 2× Platinum; ARIA: Platinum; BPI: Silver	Ladyhawke
"Magic"	2009	31	—	—	—	—	—	—	—	—	—		Ladyhawke
"Black White & Blue"	2012	—	—	32	38	—	—	—	—	— (Note: "Black White & Blue" did not enter the UK Singles Chart, but peaked at number six on the UK Physical Singles Chart.)	—		Anxiety
"Sunday Drive"	2012	—	—	—	—	—	—	—	—	—	—		Anxiety
"Blue Eyes"	2012	—	—	—	—	—	—	—	—	—	—		Anxiety
"Sweet Fascination"	2016	—	—	—	—	—	—	—	—	—	—		Wild Things
"A Love Song"	2016	— (Note: "A Love Song" did not enter the New Zealand Singles Chart, but peaked at number nine on the Top 20 New Zealand Singles Chart.)	94	—	—	—	—	—	—	—	—		Wild Things
"Dangerous"	2016	—	—	—	—	—	—	—	—	—	—		Wild Things
"Let It Roll"	2016	—	—	—	—	—	—	—	—	—	—		Wild Things
"Wild Things"	2016	—	—	—	—	—	—	—	—	—	—		Wild Things
"Colours in the Dark"	2019	—	—	—	—	—	—	—	—	—	—		Non-album single
"River" (with Pnau)	2020	— (Note: "River" did not enter the NZ Top 40 Singles Chart, but peaked at number 31 on the NZ Hot Singles Chart.)	—	—	—	—	—	—	—	—	—		Hyperbolic
"Guilty Love" (with Broods)	2021	— (Note: "Guilty Love" did not enter the NZ Top 40 Singles Chart, but peaked at number 26 on the NZ Hot Singles Chart.)	—	—	—	—	—	—	—	—	—		Time Flies
"Mixed Emotions"	2021	— (Note: "Mixed Emotions" did not enter the NZ Top 40 Singles Chart, but peaked at number 9 on the Hot NZ Singles Chart.)	—	—	—	—	—	—	—	—	—		Time Flies
"Think About You"	2021	— (Note: "Think About You" did not enter the NZ Top 40 Singles Chart, but peaked at number 19 on the Hot NZ Singles Chart.)	—	—	—	—	—	—	—	—	—		Time Flies
"Time Flies"	2021	—	—	—	—	—	—	—	—	—	—		Time Flies
"My Love"	2021	— (Note: "My Love" did not enter the NZ Top 40 Singles Chart, but peaked at number 13 on the Hot NZ Singles Chart.)	—	—	—	—	—	—	—	—	—		Time Flies
"Bad to the Bone"	2026	—	—	—	—	—	—	—	—	—	—		
"—" denotes items which were not released in that country or failed to chart.

== Other charting songs ==
List of other chartings songs showing year released and album name
Title	Year	Peak chart positions		Album
Title	Year	UK Dance	US Dance	Album
"Last Train" (Tiësto and Firebeatz featuring Ladyhawke)	2014	40	35	A Town Called Paradise

== Music videos ==
List of music videos, showing year released and director
Title	Year	Director(s)
"Back of the Van"	2008	Kinga Burza
"Paris Is Burning"	2008	Casper Balsev
"Dusk Till Dawn"	2008	Keith Schofield
"My Delirium"	2008	Frater
"Magic"	2009	Shelly Love
"Black White & Blue"	2012	Tabitha Denholm
"Sunday Drive"	2012	Mat O'Brien
"Blue Eyes"	2012	Jess Holzworth
"A Love Song"	2016	Youth Hymns
"Wild Things"	2016	Youth Hymns
"Guilty Love"	2021	Lula Cucchiara
"Mixed Emotions"	2021	Britt Walton

== Other appearances ==
List of non-single appearances, with other performing artists, showing year released and album name
Title	Year	Other artist(s)	Album
"Embrace"	2007	Pnau	Pnau
"Sister Wife" (Ladyhawke remix)	2011	Alex Winston	—N/a
"Just One Kiss" (Clique remix) (Note: The Clique remix of "Just One Kiss" premiered on BBC Radio 6 Music on 21 December 2011. It was never officially released.)	2011	Tim Burgess	—N/a
"Living in My House"	2012	Junica	The Celebration
"White Rabbit"	2012	—N/a	Like a Version, Vol. 8
"Last Train"	2014	Tiësto and Firebeatz	A Town Called Paradise
"I Wouldn't Dream of It"	2021	Various Artists	True Colours, New Colours: The Songs of Split Enz
"At Last" (Ladyhawke remix)	2026	Bec Sandridge	
