= Themes from S'Express – The Best Of =

Themes from S'Express - the Best Of

Greatest hits album by S'Express
- Released: 2004
- Recorded: 1989–1990
- Genre: Acid house, dance
- Length: 73:24
- Label: BMG; 82876 581972
- Producer: Mark Moore / Pascal Gabriel; Mark McGuire / William Orbit; Rico Conning / Ian Tregoning; James Reynolds / Pete Lorimer

S'Express chronology
Ultimate S'Express (1998)	Themes from S'Express - the Best Of (2004)

Professional ratings
Review scores
Source	Rating
Allmusic	4/5 stars

Themes from S'Express - the Best Of is a compilation album by English dance music act S'Express. Released in 2004 in consists of UK and US album tracks and b-sides.

== Track listing ==
1. "Theme from S'Express" (Overture) - 6:02
2. "Superfly Guy" - 3:31
3. "Hey Music Lover" - 4:30
4. "Mantra for a State of Mind" (Club Mix) - 8:47
5. "Can You Feel Me" - 4:34
6. "Blow Me Another Lollypop" - 3:54
7. "Pimps, Pushers & Prostitutes" - 5:56
8. "Coma II (A.M./O.K.)" - 4:56
9. "Nothing to Lose" - 6:45
10. "Find 'Em, Fool 'Em, Forget 'Em" (Wondere(s)que Mix) - 3:32
11. "I Like It" - 6:41
12. "Supersonic Lover" - 4:33
13. "Funky Killer" (12" Version) - 4:33
14. "Let it All Out" - 4:56
