= Ultimate S'Express =

Compilation album by S'Express
- Released: 1998
- Recorded: 1989–1990
- Genre: Acid house, dance
- Length: 68:55
- Label: Camden; 74321 603402
- Producer: Mark Moore / Pascal Gabriel; Mark McGuire / William Orbit; Rico Conning / Ian Tregoning; James Reynolds / Pete Lorimer

S'Express chronology
Intercourse (1991)	Ultimate S'Express (1998)	Themes from S'Express: The Best of (2004)

Professional ratings
Review scores
Source	Rating
Allmusic	3.5/5 stars

Ultimate S'Express is a compilation album by English dance music act S'Express. Released in 1998, it comprises tracks from 1989's debut album Original Soundtrack and the US version of the 1991 follow-up album Intercourse.

== Track listing ==
1. "Theme from S'Express" - 6:02
2. "Superfly Guy" - 3:31
3. "Hey Music Lover" - 4:30
4. "L'age du Gateau" - 5:02
5. "Can You Feel Me" - 4:34
6. "Blow Me Another Lollypop" - 3:54
7. "Coma II (A.M./O.K.)" - 4:56
8. "Pimps, Pushers & Prostitutes" - 5:56
9. "Nothing to Lose" - 6:45
10. "Find 'Em, Fool 'Em, Forget 'Em" - 4:48
11. "Mantra for a State of Mind" - 8:47
12. "Supersonic Lover" - 5:20
13. "Brazil" - 4:29
