= Anxiety (Ladyhawke album) =

Studio album by Ladyhawke
- Released: 25 May 2012
- Recorded: 2011
- Studios: Studio Eleven, East London
- Genre: Pop rock
- Length: 36:03
- Label: Modular
- Producers: Pip Brown; Pascal Gabriel

Ladyhawke chronology
Ladyhawke (2008)	Anxiety (2012)	Wild Things (2016)

Singles from Anxiety
- 1. "Black White & Blue" Released: 24 January 2012; 2. "Sunday Drive" Released: 9 April 2012; 3. "Blue Eyes" Released: 16 July 2012

Anxiety is the second studio album by New Zealand singer Ladyhawke. It was released on 25 May 2012 by Modular Recordings. It was recorded in early 2011 with longtime collaborator Pascal Gabriel, who co-wrote all tracks on the album. "Black White & Blue" was released as the album's lead single on 24 January 2012, followed by "Sunday Drive" on 9 April 2012 and "Blue Eyes" on 16 July 2012.

== Background and recording ==
Ladyhawke first revealed plans to work on a second album in a message on her official website in May 2010. She explained the four-year gap between her self-titled debut album and Anxiety by saying, "I had no idea how exhausted I'd be after I finished touring. I was physically incapable of doing anything. I tried to start recording about a month after I finished on tour and I turned up at the studio and just fell asleep. I was like a zombie." The album was recorded in New Zealand and at Pascal Gabriel's house in the south of France in early 2011. "Working in London, I am quite bad at getting distracted, so I think it was a ploy to literally lock me away. My bedroom is right below the studio so there is no escaping. I can hear [Gabriel's] foot tapping in the morning as if to say 'wake up'", she told Stuff.co.nz.

Ladyhawke revealed that the album was propelled by the stress of writing and recording new music after two years of touring: "I love having a fire in my belly. That was something that I had because I was really scared about disappointing people, and I knew I was going to go in a different direction. I wasn't going to stick with the same vibe that I had on the first album. I was really, really excited and keen to try something new but at the same time as taking that on I knew I might be disappointing some people. Trying to do my best under those circumstances was motivating." She added that the album is called Anxiety "because every song has that sort of feeling, my mindset throughout the recording was a mixture of being so tired and just being worried the whole time. I'm a walking ball of anxiety. It completely sums up the album."

Musically, Ladyhawke stated that her second album would be "completely different album and style" from its predecessor. "It's lot more rocky. The tone of it is definitely darker. It's still poppy and fun, but I listened to a lot of guitar rock when I was writing it, stuff like Pixies, Blur, Nirvana and I've always wanted to make a guitar record. There's no synth, but there's some organ. It's more of a straight-up rock record", she told NME. In an interview with Rolling Stone Australia, she elaborated: "I felt desperate to make a guitar record [...] It's still pop, but I don't know if other people would call it that. It's not '80s at all. I don't think it belongs to any decade. It's a mixed bag of everything I've listened to or inspired by over the years... there's elements of Bowie and Blur and the Dandy Warhols in some songs." She also described the album as "a cross between '60s and '90s guitar music".

=== Artwork ===
All the artwork for Anxiety was done by Sydney-based New Zealand visual artist Sarah Larnach, who was also responsible for the artwork for Ladyhawke. "We got together to talk about the second album and the style of it and I really wanted to do something darker that was more line-drawing based and was really inspired by the Beatles' Revolver artwork. That's my favorite album cover. So Sarah brainstormed and she came up with all this amazing stuff. She just nailed it. She's so talented", Ladyhawke said.

== Release and promotion ==
Ladyhawke premiered several songs from the album during performances at the 100 Club in London, the Phoenix Bar in Sydney and The Tote Hotel in Melbourne, including tracks such as "Vaccine", "Blue Eyes" and "Sunday Drive".

Originally scheduled to be released on 19 March 2012, Anxiety was eventually pushed back until May by Ladyhawke's label. To promote the album, Ladyhawke embarked on a 12-date tour across the United Kingdom, which began at Brighton's Komedia on 23 April 2012 and concluded at London's O_{2} Shepherd's Bush Empire on 11 May.

== Critical reception ==
Professional ratings
Aggregate scores
Source	Rating
Metacritic	64/100
Review scores
Source	Rating
AllMusic	4/5 stars
DIY	8/10
Drowned in Sound	6/10
The Fly	3.5/5 stars
The Guardian	2/5 stars
musicOMH	4/5 stars
NME	7/10
Paste	5.9/10
PopMatters	4/10
Rolling Stone	3.5/5 stars

Anxiety received generally positive reviews from music critics. At Metacritic, which assigns a normalised rating out of 100 to reviews from mainstream publications, the album received an average score of 64, based on 18 reviews. Tim Sendra of AllMusic wrote that "the sound of the album is impressive" and described Anxiety as "a great pop record with plenty of guts and a sense of reality that is so often missing from records that sound this fun." Martyn Young of DIY stated that "with an album that retains all the best things about her debut while expanding on both her sound and style, Pip Brown has more than passed the second album test." Camilla Pia of The Fly commented that on Anxiety, Ladyhawke "retains the sizzling electronics and soaring melodies of her first offering, but delivers them like a sultry wrong'un wracked with self doubt, battering drums and attacking every guitar she can lay her hands on." Ben Hogwood of musicOMH opined that "[e]verything [on Anxiety] is much more 'in the room' than the breezy, wide open spaces she favoured for the likes of 'Paris Is Burning' and 'My Delirium'. The vocals have more of an attitude, too." Rolling Stone's Jody Rosen dubbed Anxiety "a buzzsaw-sharp pop-rock album, full of hard-charging hooks, with one foot toe-tapping in 1978 and the other planted firmly in 2012."

In a mixed review, Jeff Leven of Paste magazine felt that "[t]he problem with Anxiety is that it features some of the same trappings as her earlier work without the same strength of songcraft." David Edwards of Drowned in Sound concluded, "Ultimately, for all its merits and charms, it's unlikely that Anxiety will draw in too many people who weren't smitten the first time around. But in its more luminous moments, it also contains enough to suggest that there is still a great album lurking somewhere underneath the Ladyhawke moniker." Ailbhe Malone of NME wrote that while Ladyhawke sounded "fresh", "[t]here's nothing on Anxiety so arrestingly new or comfortably familiar." The Guardian's Tim Jonze faulted Anxiety for its Britpop influences and found that "the songs aren't strong enough to make it feel vibrant", noting that "[o]nly the chugging 'Cellophane' captures the giddy, filmic qualities of Ladyhawke's early songs". Matt James of PopMatters panned the album as "slightly rubbish" and expressed, "If this is Ladyhawke trying to find herself, she's tragically lost sight of what made her amazing in the first place."

== Commercial performance ==
Anxiety debuted at number 36 on the UK Albums Chart, selling 3,910 copies in its first week.

== Track listing ==
All tracks are written by Pip Brown and Pascal Gabriel, except where noted.

No.	Title	Length
1.	"Girl Like Me"	2:55
2.	"Sunday Drive"	4:04
3.	"Black White & Blue"	3:54
4.	"Vaccine"	3:33
5.	"Blue Eyes"	3:17
6.	"Vanity"	3:00
7.	"The Quick & the Dead"	3:48
8.	"Anxiety"	3:24
9.	"Cellophane"	4:15
10.	"Gone Gone Gone"	3:53
11.	"Human" (hidden track; writers: Brown, Lester Mendez)	3:11

Notes

- On the CD release, the hidden track "Human" is included at the end of track 10, following a few seconds of silence, while the song appears as a separate track on the iTunes Store.

== Personnel ==
Credits adapted from the liner notes of Anxiety.

- Pip Brown – vocals, production, guitar, bass guitar, live drums, Omnichord, Kaossilator (all tracks); keys (track 2); art direction
- Pascal Gabriel – production, programming, engineering (all tracks); mixing (tracks 1–7, 9, 10); keys (tracks 1, 3–10)
- Stanley Gabriel – additional engineering, additional programming
- D. Sardy – mixing (track 8)
- Simon Davey – mastering
- Sarah Larnach – art direction, artwork

== Charts ==
Chart (2012)	Peak position
Australian Albums (ARIA)	17
Belgian Albums (Ultratop Flanders)	134
New Zealand Albums (RMNZ)	12
Scottish Albums (Official Charts)	53
UK Albums (Official Charts)	36
US Heatseekers Albums (Billboard)	12

== Release history ==
Region	Date	Label	Ref.
Australia	25 May 2012	Modular	
New Zealand	25 May 2012	Modular	
Germany	25 May 2012	Universal	
Netherlands	25 May 2012	Universal	
France	28 May 2012	Barclay	
Poland	29 May 2012	Universal	
United States	29 May 2012	Casablanca	
United Kingdom	4 June 2012	Island	
