= Peach (pop band) =

British musical trio

- Also known as: Peach Union
- Origin: London, England
- Genres: Pop; dance; electronic
- Instruments: Vocals; keyboards
- Years active: 1995–1998
- Labels: Mute; Epic
- Past members: Pascal Gabriel; Lisa Lamb; Paul Statham

Peach (known as Peach Union in the United States) was a British pop/dance/electronic trio formed in London in 1995. The band had several singles in the mid to late 1990s. They are best known for the 1997 hit "On My Own". The song was also featured on the soundtrack to the 1998 movie Sliding Doors.

== Overview ==
The trio was composed of the London-based singer-songwriter Lisa Lamb with the songwriter Paul Statham and the record producer Pascal Gabriel. Before Peach, Lamb had a solo career as a singer-songwriter in London, releasing a drum and bass version of the classic soft-rock song "Summer Breeze", in 1995 and working as a jazz singer. Statham had worked extensively with the former Bauhaus member Peter Murphy, and Gabriel already had a long career in the pop and dance music industry, most notably with S'Express and Bomb the Bass.

Peach released one album, Audiopeach, in 1998 on Mute/Epic Records, inspired by early 1980s music. The track "On My Own" charted well worldwide, reaching No.1 in Israel and Sweden, No.2 in Canada and Mexico as well as reaching No.69 in the UK Singles Chart and No.39 in the US. It was used in the film Sliding Doors. The album received positive reviews at the time of its release. The group disbanded without recording a follow-up album.

After the split, Gabriel and Statham continued working together for several years, writing and producing songs for a variety of acts including Dido and Kylie Minogue. Gabriel has subsequently worked with Miss Kittin, Ladyhawke, Little Boots, Marina and the Diamonds and Goldfrapp, amongst others. Lamb went on to write music for film and television, and founded a sonic branding company, creating audio identities for clients such as T-mobile, AT&T, Ben & Jerry's and Disney. On 27 November 2009, Lamb appeared at The Royal Vauxhall Tavern in South London to perform two of her Peach singles - "From This Moment On" and "Sorrow Town".

== Discography ==
=== Singles ===
Release date	Single title	UK chart peak
March 1996	"Heaven" (as Neuronic)	98
September 1996	"On My Own"	78
November 1996	"From This Moment On"	94
October 1997	"Made in Vain" (withdrawn)	N/A
November 1997	"On My Own" (re-issue)	69
July 1998	"Sorrow Town"	-

=== Albums ===
Release date	Album title
September 1997	Audiopeach
