= Paris Is Burning (song) =

2008 single by Ladyhawke

Single by Ladyhawke

from the album Ladyhawke
- B-side: "Paris S'Enflamme"
- Released: 30 June 2008
- Genre: Pop rock; electropop; synth-pop
- Length: 3:49
- Label: Modular, Island
- Songwriters: Phillipa Brown; Roy Kerr; Anu Pillai
- Producer: Kid Gloves

Ladyhawke singles chronology
| "Back of the Van" (2008) | "Paris Is Burning" (2008) | "Dusk Till Dawn" (2008) |

Music video
- "Paris Is Burning" on YouTube

"Paris Is Burning" is a pop song by New Zealand singer Ladyhawke, released on 30 June 2008 as the second single from her self-titled debut studio album, after "Back of the Van". It was written by Ladyhawke, Roy Kerr, and Anu Pillai, and produced by Kid Gloves. It was re-released on 2 March 2009; she also wrote a French version of the song named "Paris S'Enflamme". Reviewers commended the song, such as its choruses, while also describing it as being influenced by 1980s music.

== Background and release ==
Phillipa "Pip" Brown, professionally known as Ladyhawke, is a New Zealand singer-songwriter, formerly of the rock band Two Lane Blacktop and the art-rock duo Teenager. She adopted the stage name in 2004 or 2005, inspired by the film of the same name, and launched a solo career in 2006 after moving to Sydney. Brown wanted to tap into synth-pop during her solo career, seeing herself as a "pop superwoman". In January 2008, she moved to London. Ladyhawke wrote "Paris Is Burning" after a visit to the city.

"Paris Is Burning" was released as a single on 30 June 2008 by Modular Recordings and Island Records, while her debut album, Ladyhawke, was released in September. "Paris Is Burning" appears on the album. It was her second single after "Back of the Van". "Paris Is Burning" has been described as a pop rock, electropop, and synth-pop song. The Rolling Stone magazine described the song as having been influenced by 1980s music and indie rock. Gary Numan's "Cars" was sampled in the song.

In a December 2008 interview with the magazine Clash, Ladyhawke announced that "Paris Is Burning" would most likely be re-released in 2009. It was ultimately re-released on 2 March 2009. Ladyhawke also released a French version of the song, titled "Paris s'Enflamme". She said that she recorded the French version purely for fun, having been helped by Pascal Gabriel, one of her associates on the album.

Ladyhawke toured during the spring of 2009. The song was performed again during tours in April and November 2012. In 2024, Ladyhawke celebrated the debut album's 15th anniversary. To promote her 2021 album Time Flies, Ladyhawke released a promotional video game. It featured a chiptune-style version of "Paris Is Burning", as well as the song's music video.

== Reception ==
According to Emily Tartanella of PopMatters, "Paris Is Burning" was the album's biggest success. Nick Levine of Digital Spy positively rated the song, describing it as fresh and modern, while also praising the chorus. Peter Robinson of The Guardian also said that the song contains "blistering choruses". Clash described the song as glossy and 1980s-like, noting that its melody is "poptastic" and it features a "filthy bass line". Jon O'Brien of AllMusic said that "Paris Is Burning" was "highly infectious", while Anthony Tognazzini of the same publication said it was catchy.

== Personnel ==
Credits are adapted from Tidal.

- Pip Brown – vocals, composer, lyricist
- Roy Kerr – drums, composer, lyricist
- Anu Pillai – bass guitar, composer, lyricist
- Kid Gloves – producer

== Track listings ==
CD

1. "Paris Is Burning" – 3:49
2. "Paris Is Burning" (Cut Copy remix) – 5:24
3. "Paris Is Burning" (Kid Gloves CDG Chi remix) – 6:43
4. "Paris Is Burning" (A Chicken Lips Malfunction) – 6:38
5. "Paris Is Burning" (Chicken Lips Dub Deluxe) – 6:38
6. "Paris Is Burning" (video)

UK 7-inch single

A. "Paris Is Burning" (Original)
B. "Paris Is Burning" (Alex Gopher remix)

UK 7-inch single

A. "Paris Is Burning" (Peaches remix)
B. "Paris S'enflamme"

US digital EP

1. "Paris Is Burning" – 3:53
2. "Back of the Van" – 3:40
3. "Paris s'enflamme" – 3:54
4. "Paris Is Burning" (Cut Copy Remix) – 5:26
5. "Back of the Van" (Van She Tech Remix) – 6:10
6. "Danny And Jenny" – 3:32

European digital single

1. "Paris Is Burning" (radio edit)
2. "Paris Is Burning" (Matthew Dekay remix)
3. "Paris Is Burning" (Simmons and Cristopher radio mix)
4. "Paris Is Burning" (Simmons and Cristopher club mix)
5. "Paris Is Burning" (Innerpartysystem remix)
6. "Paris Is Burning" (Funkagenda remix)
7. "Paris Is Burning" (original)

Limited white 7-inch single

A. "Paris Is Burning"
B. "Paris Is Burning" (Chicken Lips Zeefungk Beatdown)

== Charts ==
| Chart (2008–2009) | Peak position |
|---|---|
| Australia (ARIA) | 52 |
| Belgium (Ultratip Bubbling Under Flanders) | 5 |
| Global Dance Tracks (Billboard) | 33 |
| Scottish Singles Sales (Official Charts) | 29 |
| New Zealand (Recorded Music NZ) | 40 |
| UK Singles (Official Charts) | 47 |
