= On My Own (Peach Union song) =

Single by Peach

from the album Audiopeach
- Released: September 2, 1996 (UK)
- Recorded: 1996; Worldwide International
- Genre: Pop; electronic
- Length: 4:58 (album version); 4:04 (music video version); 3:41 (single mix)
- Label: Epic
- Songwriters: Pascal Gabriel; Paul Statham; Lisa Lamb
- Producer: Peach Union

Peach singles chronology
"On My Own" (1996)	"From This Moment On" (1996)

"On My Own" is a song by British electronic music trio Peach (known as Peach Union in the US), released on September 2, 1996 by Epic Records as the first single from their debut and only album, Audiopeach (1998). The song was written and produced by the trio, and charted well worldwide. It reached No.5 in Israel, No.1 in Mexico, No.2 in Canada, as well as reaching No. 69 in the UK Singles Chart. "On My Own" was also their only hit on the US Billboard Hot 100, peaking at No. 39 on the week ending October 11, 1997.

The song was featured on the soundtrack to the 1998 movie Sliding Doors.

== Critical reception ==
David Stubbs from Melody Maker wrote, "Carried through by a wah-wah synth that recalls the manna-strewn days of the best early Eighties pop--imagine a more emboldened Saint Etienne, Dubstar having shaken off their melancholy with a couple of Screwdrivers. Peach could be the Pearly Kings and Queens of pop come '97 if they keep up the pace of this debut single." Another Melody Maker editor, Jonathan Selzer, commented, "'On My Own' is a song about personal destiny. It belongs, more than anywhere, on the radio, as part of the public consciousness, even though it knocks you for six. Like Saint Etienne, Peach create perfect, composite settings, somewhere between Mansfield and Monte Carlo, bonding kitchen sink drama and cosmopolitan glitz. You'll recognise it--an epiphany, an elevation of the everyday."

In 2017, Billboard ranked it number 67 in their list of "The 100 Greatest Pop Songs of 1997", naming it "a fantastic, totally forgotten one-off that sounded like an Britpop-injected version of St. Etienne's pop sophistication".

== Charts ==
=== Weekly charts ===
Chart (1996)	Peak position
Israel (Israeli Singles Chart)	5
UK Singles (OCC)	69

Chart (1997)	Peak position
Canada (The Record)	2
US Billboard Hot 100	39
US Top 40 Mainstream (Billboard)	19
US Adult Top 40 (Billboard)	26

=== Year-end charts ===
Chart (1997)	Position
Canada Top Singles (RPM)	45
