= Audiopeach =

Studio album by Peach
- Released: 1998
- Genres: Pop, Synthpop, Electronic
- Length: 42:23
- Labels: Sony, Mute Records
- Producers: Pascal Gabriel, Lisa Lamb, Paul Statham

Professional ratings
Review scores
Source	Rating
AllMusic	3/5 stars

Audiopeach is the debut studio album by the British pop band Peach, released in 1998. The album was the only one released by the group (who were named Peach Union in the US) and contained the singles "On My Own", "From This Moment On" and "Sorrow Town".

In the US, the group achieved success with their debut single, "On My Own", which reached #39 in the Billboard Hot 100 It peaked at #1 in Israel and Mexico, and #2 in the Canadian Top 40.

== Critical reception ==
Scripps News Service thought that "Peach Union reconciles sensual dance music with an effective dark mood, underscored by gloomy chords and [Lisa] Lamb's sometimes melancholy vocals." The Miami Herald wrote: "Think frothy ABBA-styled hooks with an eye toward the dance floor." The Stuart News declared: "Sweet, firm and ripe, the album celebrates and updates the glistening dance tunes and melodies of old-school '80s techno-pop auteurs like ABC, Human League, Thomas Dolby and Culture Club."

== Track listing ==
1. No.	Title	Writer(s)	Length
  1.	"On My Own"	Pascal Gabriel, Paul Statham, Lisa Lamb	4:58
  2.	"From This Moment On"	Gabriel, Statham	4:03
  3.	"Made in Vain"	Gabriel, Statham	5:50
  4.	"Perfect World"	Gabriel, Statham, Lamb	3:48
  5.	"Sorrow Town"	Gabriel, Statham, Lamb	3:53
  6.	"Deep Down Together"	Gabriel, Statham, Lamb	3:41
  7.	"Tell Me"	Gabriel, Statham, Lamb	4:13
  8.	"Give Me Tomorrow"	Gabriel, Statham	3:33
  9.	"Higher Ground"	Gabriel, Statham	4:28
  10.	"Hush"	Gabriel, Statham, Lamb	3:56
  Japanese release
  No.	Title	Writer(s)	Length
  11.	"Come to Me"	Pascal Gabriel, Paul Statham, Lisa Lamb	3:49
  12.	"On My Own (RH Factor Vocal Club Mix)"	Pascal Gabriel, Paul Statham, Lisa Lamb	7:43
