= Mantra for a State of Mind =

Single by S'Express

from the album Intercourse
- Released: 1989
- Recorded: September 1989
- Genre: Acid house
- Length: 3:59 (single edit)
- Label: Rhythm King
- Songwriter(s): Mark Moore; Brendan Beal
- Producer(s): Mark Moore; Mark McGuire

S'Express singles chronology
"Hey Music Lover" (1989)	"Mantra for a State of Mind" (1989)	"Nothing to Lose" (1990)

"Mantra for a State of Mind" is a song by British dance act S'Express, released as a single in September 1989 by Rhythm King. It is written by Mark Moore and Brendan Beal, and produced by Moore with Mark McGuire. The single was the act's penultimate top 40 hit, reaching No. 21 on the UK Singles Chart. The song formed part of their second album, Intercourse (1991).

In 2016, Primal Scream released a cover of the track on a double A-side for Record Store Day. This version featured backing vocals from original S'Express vocalist Naomi Osbourne and Jason Pierce of Spiritualized on guitar.

== Critical reception ==
David Giles from Music Week wrote, "The only mantra here is the hypnotic sequencer which is supplemented by an almost bluesy vocal and occasional switches to other rhythmic modes. The swirling keyboards induce further levitation. A potential number one."

== Charts ==
Chart (1989)	Peak position
Australia (ARIA)	141
Finland (Suomen virallinen lista)	14
Ireland (IRMA)	12
Luxembourg (Radio Luxembourg)	17
UK Singles (OCC)	21
