= Magic (Ladyhawke song) =

Single by Ladyhawke

from the album Ladyhawke
- Released: September 27, 2009
- Recorded: Studio Eleven, London, England
- Genre: New wave, synthpop
- Length: 3:27
- Label: Island, Modular
- Songwriter(s): Phillipa Brown, Pascal Gabriel
- Producer(s): Pascal Gabriel

Ladyhawke singles chronology
"My Delirium" (2008)	"Magic" (2009)	"Black White & Blue" (2012)

"Magic" is a song performed by New Zealand recording artist Ladyhawke, released as the fifth and final single from her debut album Ladyhawke (2008). It was produced by Pascal Gabriel who co-wrote the song with Ladyhawke herself. The song was inspired to be a fantasy epic and love song. Lyrically, it tells a story about trying to coax someone over to talk to you, where in reality you feel alone.

"Magic" received critical acclaim with most critics giving the song positive reviews. The single peaked at number thirty-one in New Zealand, becoming her second most successful single and third top forty hit there to-date. It was accompanied by a music video, directed by Shelly Love and released on September 30, 2009.

== Background and writing ==
The song was written by Ladyhawke and Pascal Gabriel. Ladyhawke wrote the song when she first went to London and she didn't know anyone. She describes it as a fantasy epic where she has someone and she is trying to coax them over to talk to her, where in reality she felt alone. She also says it is a love song, but also a 'pining' song.

== Critical reception ==
"Magic" received positive reviews from contemporary critics. Jude Rogers of The Guardian called the song a widescreen electronic epic, feeling that it may be the best opening track on any album for 2008. Nadine O'Began from Spin also positively reviewed the song: "The juddering 'Magic' recalls New Order but pulses with an addictive grandeur of its own." While About.com's Ben Norman felt that it was a mostly understated track with brilliant lyrics and a haunting harmony.

== Chart performance ==
"Magic" debuted on the New Zealand Singles Chart at number thirty-one on 12 October 2009, before slipping seven places to number thirty-eight. It repeated this pattern, before falling off the chart, having spent four weeks in the top forty.
