= Intercourse (S'Express album) =

Studio album by S'Express
- Released: 1991
- Recorded: 1989–1990
- Genre: Acid house, dance
- Length: 73:20 (US) / 66:51 (UK)
- Label: Sire / Rhythm King; 9 26520-2 / 468567 2
- Producer: Mark Moore / Martin Gordon; James Reynolds; Ian Tregoning; Pete Lorimer / William Orbit; Rico Conning

S'Express chronology
Original Soundtrack (1989)	Intercourse (1991)	Ultimate S'Express (1998)

Singles from Intercourse
- 1. "Mantra for a State of Mind" Released: 1989; 2. "Nothing to Lose" Released: 1990; 3. "Find 'Em, Fool 'Em, Forget 'Em" Released: 1991; 4. "Find 'Em, Fool 'Em / Let It All Out EP" Released: 1992

Professional ratings
Review scores
Source	Rating
AllMusic	2/5 stars
Calgary Herald	B

Intercourse is the second (and to date last) studio album by English dance music act S'Express. For this release, S'Express was basically Mark Moore and Sonique with a variety of guest vocalists and musicians. It was originally released in the US in 1991 with a UK / European release following shortly afterwards.

The track listing varied considerably between the two territories but with neither release enjoying chart success. Four singles were released from the album over a period of three years, the earliest of which - "Mantra for a State of Mind" was the biggest hit, reaching #21 on the UK Singles Chart.

== Critical reception ==
Dave Obee from Calgary Herald wrote, "Formerly a sextet - really - S`Express is down to the duo of Mark Moore and a singer named Sonique - again, really. Moore is, allegedly, the brains behind the band, but Sonique is the real story. Her sultry, soaring voice - reminiscent almost of Boy George's - can handle a wide variety of material, all based on a dance beat. When she`s not singing, the disc offers solid dance music with occasional flashes of brilliance. When she is, the clouds part and the sun shines through. And soon, she`ll have us all dancing to "Twinkle, Twinkle, Little Star". Yes, really."

== Track listing ==
=== US CD (9 26520-2) ===
1. "Nothing to Lose" - 6:45 *
2. "Trumpets" - 6:52
3. "Find 'Em, Fool 'Em, Forget 'Em" - 4:48
4. "Twinkle (Step into My Mind)" - 5:45
5. "Nervous Motion" - 6:35
6. "Find Time to Be Yourself" - 4:03
7. "What Does it Take?" - 6:03
8. "Supersonic Lover" - 5:20
9. "Brazil" - 4:29
10. "Mantra for a State of Mind" (Club Vocal) - 8:47
11. "Twinkle (Step into My Mind)" (Psychotronic Mix) - 7:03
12. "Nervous Motion" (Gurls Mix) - 6:35
- * A second US pressing replaced this version with the 2:54 Single Mix (taken from the US 9 track CD single) of 'Nothing To Lose'. The album catalogue numbers are identical although the CD matrix numbers differ - 1 26520-2 RE-1 SRC+01 for the 2:54 Single Mix and 1 26520-2 SRC=02 for the regular 6:45 version.

=== UK LP & CD (468567 1/2) ===
Sources:

1. "Nothing to Lose" - 6:45
2. "Trumpets" - 6:52
3. "Find 'Em, Fool 'Em, Forget 'Em" (Wondere(s)que Mix) - 3:32
4. "Twinkle (Step into My Mind)" (Psychotronic Mix) - 7:03
5. "Nervous Motion" - 6:05
6. "Find Time to Be Yourself" - 4:03
7. "I Like It" - 6:41
8. "Supersonic Lover" - 4:33
9. "Brazil" - 4:29
10. "Mantra for a State of Mind" (Club Mix) - 8:47 *
11. "Find 'Em, Fool 'Em, Forget 'Em" (The Eighth Out Mix) - 7:47 *
- * CD bonus tracks. The booklet lists the timings for these tracks in the wrong order.

== Notes ==
- The UK and US regular versions of "Nervous Motion" are, although not identified as such, different mixes.
- "Supersonic Lover" is edited for the UK release.
- The 'Club Mix' and 'Club Vocal' versions of "Mantra for a State of Mind" are identical.
