= Mark Moore =

British record producer and DJ

- Born: 12 January 1965 (age 61)
- Origin: London, England
- Genres: Dance; house; acid house; pop; alternative
- Occupations: Disc jockey; record producer; remixer; nightclub owner; writer
- Years active: 1988–present
- Labels: Rhythm King; Splish; Capitol; Warner Bros.; Sony; BMG; Stylofiction; Bone; Umami

Mark Moore (born 12 January 1965) is a British dance music record producer and DJ. He was founder of dance/sampling pioneers S'Express, and runs the London nightclubs Electrogogo, and Can Can.

== Biography ==
Moore began his DJ career in 1983 playing at the fashionable London club, The Mud Club, run by Philip Sallon. Later that year as his popularity grew, he was given a slot at the alternative, mixed/gay night 'Asylum' at Heaven nightclub, which later became 'Pyramid' at Heaven. He soon became a successful DJ often appearing in Time Out's 'best DJ' polls. As well as playing new wave electronic music such as Yello, Cabaret Voltaire, Soft Cell and New Order, Moore was one of the first DJs in the UK to support and play Chicago house music and Detroit techno. In 1987, Moore's remix of "Step by Step" by Taffy was released by Rhythm King's Transglobal Records as "Step by Step (Moore Heavenly Mix)".

In 1988, Moore launched S'Express with co-writer/co-producer Pascal Gabriel. The first single "Theme From S'Express", released on Rhythm King, went to number 1 in the UK Singles Chart, and is credited by Muzik magazine as 'kick starting the UK house scene'. This was followed up with "Superfly Guy", which reached number 5 in the UK Chart.

Moore and William Orbit formed a friendship, when Moore asked Orbit to remix the S'Express hit, "Hey Music Lover", and the duo worked together mixing Prince's "Batdance", "Electric Chair" and "The Future" plus Malcolm McLaren's "Deep in Vogue", "Something's Jumpin' In Your Shirt" and "Call A Wave". Moore also had a working relationship with engineer Mark McGuire. He would feature up-and-coming Billie Ray Martin as vocalist on "Hey Music Lover", giving her early exposure before her band, Electribe 101, released its debut album. An admirer of the composer Philip Glass, Moore asked Glass to remix "Hey Music Lover", which the composer did in singular style. A friendship was also formed with Carl Craig when he first came to London aged 19 and Craig worked on the second S'Express album "Intercourse".

Moore also had made a cameo appearance as a pirate radio DJ on Bomb the Bass's debut album Into The Dragon. Moore was heard playing the 'fluffy bagel mix' of "Superfly Guy" on "Get Outta Bed Radio!" That mix can by found on the Hip Hop and Rapping in the House compilation released in the late 1980s. Other cameos include appearing on the French & Saunders TV show as part of the She Rappers sketch, which can be seen on 'The Best of French And Saunders' DVD.

During 2002, he was involved with the Needledust project with Robert Michael and Tim Southgate. From 2003 to 2007, he helmed the Electrogogo club in Madame Jojo's in Soho, London. In 2005, Moore set up the record label Umami Records. From 2005 onwards, Moore has released new music and remixes under the monikers Mark Moore & Eon, Mark Moore & Kinky Roland and UltraViva (with David Motion). Moore has also remixed Prince, Malcolm McLaren, Seal, Erasure, Dead Or Alive, Divine, Boystown Gang, The Real Thing, Randy Crawford, The B-52's, Soft Cell, the electro pop band, Temposhark, Unklejam, Client, Mlle Caro & Frank Garcia, Next Door But One and Chanty Poe, amongst others. In 2008 S'Express came out of cryogenic slumber and released "Stupid Little Girls" on the Kitsuné label to mark the 20-year anniversary of the second summer of love and (according to Moore) to 'confuse the history books'.

Moore also writes articles for magazines. He has a weekly music column with Princess Julia in QX International. Published articles include: interviews with John Waters (Waters gave Moore permission to sample his voice on the start of the S'Express track "Brazil") and Siouxsie Sioux (for ID magazine); a Russ Meyer feature for Fused; 'Acid House London: The Mark Moore Experience' for Clash Magazine; 'Punk Rock Saved My Life' for Super Super.

== S'Express discography ==
=== Albums ===
- 1989 Original Soundtrack – (Rhythm King, LEFT CD8)- UK No. 5
- 1991 Intercourse – (US, Sire, 9 26520-2) (UK, Rhythm King / Epic, 468567 2)
- 1998 Ultimate S'Express – (Camden / BMG, 74321 603402)
- 2004 Themes from S'Express - the Best Of – (BMG, 82876 581972)
- 2016 Enjoy this Trip – (Needle Boss Records, B01FGV67I6)

=== Singles ===
Year	Title	UK Singles Chart	AUS	GER	US	US dance	Album
1988	"Theme from S'Express"	1	11	2	91	1	Original Soundtrack
1988	"Superfly Guy"	5	35	13	-	2	Original Soundtrack
1989	"Hey Music Lover"	6	-	29	-	6	Original Soundtrack
1989	"Mantra for a State of Mind"	21	-	-	-	-	Intercourse
1990	"Nothing to Lose"	32	-	-	-	9	Intercourse
1991	"Find 'Em, Fool 'Em, Forget 'Em"	43	-	-	-	-	Intercourse
1992	"Find 'Em, Fool 'Em / Let It All Out EP"	-	-	-	-	-	Intercourse
1996	"Theme from S'Express – The Return Trip"^{1}	14	42	-	-	-	—
2008	"Stupid Little Girls"^{2}	-	-	-	-	-	—

- ^{1} remixes by Tony De Vit, Aquarius and Carl Craig and accredited to Mark Moore presents S'Express.
- ^{2} released on download and 12" vinyl only.

== See also ==
- Timeline of Billboard number-one dance songs
- List of artists who reached number one on the U.S. Dance Club Songs chart

== Sources ==
- Bainbridge, Luke (2014). The True Story of Acid House: Britain's Last Youth Culture Revolution. London: Omnibus Press. ISBN 978-1-7803-8734-5.
- Collin, Matthew (2009). Altered State: The Story of Ecstasy Culture and Acid House. London: Serpent's Tails. ISBN 978-0-7535-0645-5.
- Shulman, Alon (2019). The Second Summer of Love: How Dance Music Took Over the World. London: John Blake. ISBN 978-1-7894-6075-9.
