= Dusk Till Dawn (Ladyhawke song) =

Single by Ladyhawke

from the album Ladyhawke
- B-side: "Danny and Jenny"
- Released: 15 September 2008
- Studio: Studio Eleven (London)
- Genre: Electropop; indie rock; new wave
- Length: 2:37
- Label: Modular
- Songwriter(s): Phillipa Brown; Pascal Gabriel; Alex Gray; Hannah Robinson
- Producer(s): Pascal Gabriel

Ladyhawke singles chronology
"Paris Is Burning" (2008)	"Dusk Till Dawn" (2008)	"My Delirium" (2008)

Music videos
- "Dusk Till Dawn" on YouTube
- "Dusk Till Dawn" (alternative version) on YouTube

"Dusk Till Dawn" is a song by New Zealand singer Ladyhawke from her self-titled debut studio album (2008). It was released on 15 September 2008 in the United Kingdom as the album's third single. The song was co-written by Ladyhawke, Pascal Gabriel, Alex Gray and Hannah Robinson, and produced by Gabriel. The track was featured on the third episode of Gossip Girl, "Poison Ivy", originally aired 3 October 2007.

== Background and writing ==
According to co-writer Hannah Robinson, "Dusk Till Dawn" was written at the same session as "My Delirium", their first and only together. The lyrics came about from brainstorming the ideas they had. At the time Ladyhawke had just landed off a flight from New Zealand and was feeling very jet-lagged.

== Critical reception ==
Mike Orme of Pitchfork wrote that "Dusk Till Dawn" "marches along to the beat of both the urban white chic of Gwen Stefani and the coke-nosed disco rock of Franz Ferdinand." Emily Tartanella of PopMatters described the song as a "hybrid between Franz Ferdinand and Madonna", and Ben Norman of About.com stated that it "sounds like a (better) Ting Tings number."

== Commercial performance ==
The single debuted at number 78 on the UK Singles Chart for the week of 21 September 2008, spending a sole week on the chart.

== Music video ==
The music video for "Dusk Till Dawn" opens with Ladyhawke in a bed with a man. She looks out of the window at a ghost, next she runs downstairs, where she starts to get haunted by monsters. She then gets circled by monsters, each wearing a mask with a corresponding T-shirt. She tries to awake her boyfriend, but as it fails, she tries to call someone but is tracked down by the monsters and runs away. She then starts to dance with the monsters. She then wakes up and pulls the cover off her boyfriend and realizes in fear that he is dead. She goes into the bathroom, washes her hands and then leans down and when she arises she has a mask which resembles her face and a T-shirt which says "Ladyhawke", she then starts dancing again. The video finishes when she wakes up in the daytime.

Ladyhawke made an alternate homemade video where she appears in front of a webcam performing the song, along with friends such as Sia, Peaches and JD Samson. She shows her geeky side from the start, when she is seen playing with a Kermit the Frog toy dressed as Luke Skywalker and a Mr. Potato Head toy as Darth Vader. Sia appears with her face being drawn with a marker in a style similar to her 2008 "Buttons" video. The video was directed by Keith Schofield.

== Track listings ==
- UK CD single

(MODCDS061; Released: 15 September 2008)

1. "Dusk Till Dawn" (Original) – 2:37
2. "Dusk Till Dawn" (Simon & Shaker Remix) – 9:37
3. "Dusk Till Dawn" (The Shoes Remix) – 4:09
4. "Dusk Till Dawn" (Canyons Remix) – 4:25
- UK 7-inch single

(MODVL105; Released: 15 September 2008)

A. "Dusk Till Dawn" – 2:37
B. "Danny and Jenny" – 3:34

- UK digital single

(Released: 14 September 2008)

1. "Dusk Till Dawn" (Radio Edit) – 2:36
2. "Dusk Till Dawn" – 2:46
3. "Dusk Till Dawn" (Live) – 2:43
4. "Dusk Till Dawn" (Simon & Shaker Remix) – 9:37
5. "Dusk Till Dawn" (The Shoes Remix) – 4:08
6. "Dusk Till Dawn" (The Canyons Remix) – 4:24
7. "Dusk Till Dawn" (Linus Loves Remix) – 5:19
- UK digital single – B-side bundle

(Released: 14 September 2008)

1. "Dusk Till Dawn" – 2:37
2. "Danny and Jenny" – 3:34
- UK digital single – Radio Edit

(Released: 14 September 2008)

1. "Dusk Till Dawn" (Tom Elmhirst Radio Mix) – 2:36
- Australian digital EP

(Released: 1 November 2008)

1. "Dusk Till Dawn" – 2:36
2. "Dusk Till Dawn" (Simon & Shaker Remix) – 9:37
3. "Dusk Till Dawn" (The Shoes Remix) – 4:07
4. "Dusk Till Dawn" (The Canyons Remix) – 4:24
5. "Dusk Till Dawn" (Linus Loves Remix) – 5:19

== Credits and personnel ==
- Pip Brown – lead vocals, backing vocals, guitar
- Pascal Gabriel – production, engineering, mixing, keyboards, guitar, bass synthesizer, drums, |percussion
- Alex Gray – Rhodes drums, keyboards
- Hannah Robinson – backing vocals

== Charts ==
Chart (2008)	Peak position
Scotland (OCC)	25
UK Singles (OCC)	78
