= Original Soundtrack (album) =

Studio album by S'Express
- Released: 20 March 1989
- Recorded: 1988–1989
- Genre: Acid house; dance
- Length: 52:14
- Label: Rhythm King; Mute; Capitol
- Producer: Mark Moore; Pascal Gabriel; Mark McGuire

S'Express chronology
Original Soundtrack (1989)	Intercourse (1991)

Singles from Original Soundtrack
- 1. "Theme from S'Express" Released: April 1988; 2. "Superfly Guy" Released: July 1988; 3. "Hey Music Lover" Released: Feb. 1989

Professional ratings
Review scores
Source	Rating
AllMusic	3/5 stars
Number One	4/5 stars

Original Soundtrack is the debut album by English dance music act S'Express, released in 1989. It was predominantly written and produced by Mark Moore along with Mark McGuire. Pascal Gabriel co-produced the album's two biggest hits, "Theme from S'Express" and "Superfly Guy". The album charted well in the UK, reaching number five on the UK Albums Chart, and was also received well on the US dance chart. The album was certified gold in the UK by the British Phonographic Industry.

The album was heavily influenced by Acid house and utilized many samples from other music and artists. Although many of the vocals on the album are from samples, S'Express was presented at the time as a group consisting of producers Moore and Gabriel with singers Michellé and Jocasta and musician Mark D. Additional vocals were provided by Billie Ray Martin. The artwork to the album is a tribute to Tamara de Lempicka and is influenced by her style and includes a version of her painting "Andromeda", which was originally a nude. The original painting is owned by, and included in Madonna's music videos "Open Your Heart" (1986) and "Vogue" (1990).

== Track listing ==
1. "Overture" (Moore) / "Theme from S'Express" (Moore, Gabriel) - 6:02
2. "L'age du Gateau" (Moore) - 5:02
3. "Can You Feel Me" (Moore, E. Mix) - 4:34
4. "Superfly Guy" (Moore, Gabriel) - 3:31
5. "Blow Me Another Lollypop" (Moore, Gabriel) - 3:54
6. "Hey Music Lover" (Sly Stone) - 4:30
7. "Pimps, Pushers, Prostitutes" (Moore, Merlin, McGuire) - 5:56
8. "Special and Golden (Parts I & II)" (Moore, B. Beal) - 8:06
9. "Coma II (A.M./O.K.)" (Moore) - 4:56
10. "Pimps, Pushers, Prostitutes" (Instrumental) - 5:37

=== 2010 re-release track listing ===
1. "Overture" (Moore) / "Theme from S'Express" (Moore, Gabriel) - 6:02
2. "L'age du Gateau" (Moore) - 5:02
3. "Can You Feel Me" (Moore, E. Mix) - 4:34
4. "Superfly Guy" (Moore, Gabriel) - 3:31
5. "Blow Me Another Lollypop" (Moore, Gabriel) - 3:54
6. "Hey Music Lover" (Sly Stone) - 4:30
7. "Pimps, Pushers, Prostitutes" (Moore, Merlin, McGuire) - 5:56
8. "Special and Golden (Parts I & II)" (Moore, B. Beal) - 8:06
9. "Coma II (A.M./O.K.)" (Moore) - 4:56
10. "Pimps, Pushers, Prostitutes" (Instrumental) - 5:37
11. "Theme From S-Express" (12” Mix) - 6:01
12. "The Trip" (Microdot House 12” Mix) - 5:43
13. "Superfly Guy" (The Fluffy Bagel Mix) - 7:02
14. "Hey Music Lover" (Miller Mash Glass Smash Mix) - 5:27

== Personnel ==
Starring

- Mark Moore - Keyboards & drum patterns & noise & electric doormat & analogue organ rotorvator.
- Michellé - Vox & B-vox & orgasmatron.
- Chilo - Sampled vox & guitar & sampled guitar chords & percussion.
- Linda Love - Keyboards & Baby Baby Grand & Great Semprini.

Also Starring

- Mark McGuire - Drum patterns & programming.
- Brendan Charles Beal - Keyboards & flute & sax & tremolo modulation & analogue organ rotorvator.

With Special Guests

- Billie Ray Martin - Vox & B-vox.
- E. Mix - Vox.
- Eric Robinson - Vox & B-vox.
- Steam - Vox.
- Suzanne Rhatigan - B-vox.

Also

- Annie Stephenson - Strings.
- Gordon M - Brass.

== Charts ==
Year	Chart	Position
1989	Australia (ARIA)	69
1989	UK (CIN)	5
