= Wild Things (album) =

Studio album by Ladyhawke
- Released: 3 June 2016
- Recorded: 2015
- Studios: Studio America, Pasadena, California
- Genre: Synth-pop
- Length: 37:48
- Label: Mid Century
- Producers: Tommy English; Scott Hoffman

Ladyhawke chronology
Anxiety (2012)	Wild Things (2016)	Time Flies (2021)

Singles from Wild Things
- 1. "A Love Song" Released: 10 March 2016; 2. "Wild Things" Released: 15 July 2016

Wild Things is the third studio album by New Zealand singer Ladyhawke. It was released on 3 June 2016 by Mid Century Records in Europe and Oceania and by Polyvinyl in the United States. It is her first release since 2012's Anxiety.

== Background and recording ==
The album was recorded in Los Angeles with producer Tommy English, who was introduced to Ladyhawke by tattoo artist and friend Kat Von D. "We sat in a room and would jam around, play around with ideas. Or he'll sit there making a beat. I instantly knew when something inspired me. That's when we'd run with it." Ladyhawke explained. Speaking about her first new material since 2012's Anxiety, Ladyhawke stated that the reason why she felt there was such a big gap in her album releases was because she didn't want to release anything she wasn't proud of. Prior to the recording of Wild Things, Ladyhawke had actually recorded more "darker" material, but decided the material truly didn't reflect her real self.

Ladyhawke went through professional struggles before the recording of Wild Things, citing a growing dependency on alcohol and depression. "It was like I had an out-of-body experience. I saw myself and couldn't believe what I'd become", Ladyhawke told The Guardian. "I felt disgusted, like: 'What the fuck am I doing?' I'd made my career come to a grinding halt because I was not doing anything; I was wallowing in my own shit and I was drinking too much, and I felt so bad. I felt the worst hangover coupled with depression and aching and felt horrible. Bloated and disgusting like a pig." Moving to Los Angeles and her marriage to actress Madeleine Sami helped Ladyhawke sober up enough to make changes to her life and the recording of Wild Things took place, with most of the songs written about her new wife.

== In popular culture ==
"Let It Roll" was featured in an advertisement for Australian telecommunications company Optus. The song was also featured in a commercial for Converse entitled "First Day Feels" starring Stranger Things star Millie Bobby Brown. "A Love Song" and "The River" are featured in the soundtrack of the 2016 racing video game Forza Horizon 3. "A Love Song" is also featured in the sitcom Impastor. "Golden Girl" was featured in an episode of the television series Supergirl. "A Love Song" was featured in the end credits of the movie The Breaker Upperers and an episode of the Hulu series Dollface.

== Critical reception ==
Professional ratings
Aggregate scores
Source	Rating
AnyDecentMusic?	6.5/10
Metacritic	62/100
Review scores
Source	Rating
AllMusic	3/5 stars
Spin	8/10
MusicOMH	4/5 stars
Pitchfork	5.7/10
DIY	4/5 stars
Magnet (magazine)	7.5/10
The Guardian	2/5 stars

Wild Things was met with mostly positive reviews from music critics. On Metacritic, it has a weighted average score of 62 out of 100 based on 11 reviews, indicating "generally favorable reviews".

Some critics perceived Wild Things to be an intentional move away from the darker themes of Anxiety (2012), particularly with rumours that a full album had been scrapped prior to the conception of Wild Things. In a mixed review by Pitchfork, Katherine St. Asaph praised "thorniness" and "rock-star swagger" vocal on "Let It Roll", but wrote that the move to a happier sound on the album resulted in "straightforward synth-pop". However, El Hunt of DIY described the album as Brown's "most consistent album to date" and praised the production and lyrics, writing: "witty and quick-smart, Ladyhawke’s lyrics consistently take on infectious lust and undeniable infatuation". Brennan Carley of Spin also gave a positive review, labelling the album a "collection of expertly rendered synthesized-rock" and gave it an 8/10 rating. In a less positive review, Rachel Aroesti of The Guardian gave the album 2/5, describing it as "grooveless, flatly bombastic and faintly retro subgenre-dodging pop-pop", but considered the production "slick and competent" and complimented Brown's ability to write good hooks.

== Track listing ==
All lyrics are written by Pip Brown; all music is composed by Brown and Tommy English, except where noted.

No.	Title	Length
1.	"A Love Song" (music: Brown, English, Josh Moran)	3:24
2.	"The River"	3:26
3.	"Wild Things"	5:13
4.	"Let It Roll"	3:08
5.	"Chills" (music: Brown, Scott Hoffman)	3:09
6.	"Sweet Fascination"	3:48
7.	"Golden Girl"	3:03
8.	"Hillside Avenue"	2:39
9.	"Money to Burn"	2:39
10.	"Wonderland"	3:33
11.	"Dangerous"	3:41
Total length:		37:48

== Personnel ==
Credits adapted from the liner notes of Wild Things.

- Pip Brown – vocals, art direction
- Tommy English – mixing, production
- Scott Hoffman – co-production (track 5)
- Joe LaPorta – mastering
- Sarah Larnach – art direction, layout

== Charts ==
Chart (2016)	Peak position
Australian Albums (ARIA)	19
New Zealand Albums (RMNZ)	5
Scottish Albums (Official Charts)	38
UK Albums (Official Charts)	57
UK Independent Albums (Official Charts)	7
US Heatseekers Albums (Billboard)	15
