= My Delirium =

Single by Ladyhawke

from the album Ladyhawke
- B-side: "My Delirium" (Sunship Remix); "My Delirium" (Sugardaddy Remix); "My Delirium" (Chateau Marmont Remix)
- Released: 8 December 2008
- Genre: New wave; indie rock
- Length: 4:19
- Label: Modular; Island
- Songwriters: Pip Brown; Pascal Gabriel; Alex Gray; Hannah Robinson
- Producer: Pascal Gabriel

Ladyhawke singles chronology
"Dusk Till Dawn" (2008)	"My Delirium" (2008)	"Magic" (2009)

Audio sample
- file; help

"My Delirium" is a song performed by New Zealand musician Ladyhawke. The third track on Ladyhawke's eponymous debut album, the song was released as a single on 8 December 2008. The most commercially successful single of Ladyhawke's to date, "My Delirium" sold over 70,000 copies in Australia, peaked at number nine on the New Zealand Singles Chart, number eight on the Australian ARIA Singles Chart and has reached the top 50 in the UK and Denmark.

== Background and writing ==
"My Delirium" was written by Ladyhawke, alongside Hannah Robinson and Pascal Gabriel, both of whom Ladyhawke worked with on her previous single. Ladyhawke later said she was looking for high-powered producers to collaborate with. Ladyhawke wrote "My Delirium" after suffering a lack of sleep due to jetlag and feeling a sense of homesickness. According to co-writer Robinson, "My Delirium" and "Dusk Till Dawn" were both written on their first and only session together. Ladyhawke, when describing her songwriting process, stated she tries "to keep simple hooky guitar riffs throughout the tracks..." and she "wanted to capture the 'happy sad' vibe that so many eighties classics had."

== Critical reception ==
"My Delirium" received several positive reviews from critics. Nisha Diu of The Sunday Telegraph described "My Delirium" as "...a moody, energetic anthem underscored by insistent drums and a soulful vocal..." Popjustice described the song as "brilliant", and Digital Spy entertainment reporter David Balls labelled the song as a "glorious slice of indie-electronica". In its review, AllMusic said the song "echoes the power pop of The Bangles and The Go-Go's". Frazier McAlpine, on a BBC blog, described "My Delirium" as "a good pop song ... grumpily delivered", and called Ladyhawke's voice "sulky".

== Music video ==
The distinctive watercolour effect is evident in this screen, as is the rotoscoped Ford Thunderbird.

The music video for "My Delirium" was directed by Benji Davies and Jim Field, together known as Frater. The video starts with Ladyhawke in a roadside motel looking out the window while packing her bags. The video then transitions into an animated picture on the wall, depicting Ladyhawke leaving the motel and driving along a remote desert road in a Ford Thunderbird (all allusions to Thelma & Louise). As the video continues, the desert road backdrop becomes more unusual, with landmarks such as Mount Rushmore with the heads of cats being passed by, until the bridge, where the car is seen to drive off a cliff and begins to fly (another allusion to Thelma & Louise). The video then continues with Ladyhawke playing the guitar in watercolour, and driving through space. The video finishes by fading out of the picture and back into the now-empty motel room.

When producing the music video, Frater collaborated with Sarah Larnach, who also drew the album cover for the Ladyhawke album and her singles. Larnach painted nearly all of the background scenes, and the images of Ladyhawke and the car were created using a rotoscope layering technique.

== Legacy ==
American singer-songwriter Christina Aguilera recorded a cover version of the song circa 2009, which was confirmed by Ladytron, who collaborated with the artist at that time. However, the song was scrapped and remains unreleased. "My Delirium" was used in the following television shows, video games and films:

- The song was used on one episode of The World's Strictest Parents.
- An instrumental version of the song was used on a Top Gear episode (series 12, episode six).
- The song was also occasionally used on the Nine Network's Sunday Footy Show.
- The song was featured in the video game Colin McRae: Dirt 2.
- The song was used in the intros round of the popular UK panel game show Never Mind the Buzzcocks (series 23, episode four)
- The song was also featured in Forum Snowboarding's 2010 film F*ck It.

== Chart performance ==
"My Delirium" is Ladyhawke's most commercially successful song to date, having charted higher than both "Paris Is Burning" and "Dusk Till Dawn" on the UK, Australian, and New Zealand charts. The song started charting on digital downloads, debuting at number 119 on the UK Singles Chart three weeks before its physical release. The next week it rose 44 places to number 75 with two weeks until its physical release, before continuing to rise to a peak of number 33 on 20 December. In New Zealand, the song debuted at number 30 on 2 February 2009 before peaking at number nine in its seventeenth week on the chart. It was certified Gold on 13 September 2009, selling over 7,500 copies. In Australia, the song peaked at number eight on 1 February after 13 weeks. It has also been certified Platinum, selling over 70,000 copies. In Denmark, the song peaked at number 36, yet failed to beat "Paris is Burning" on the European charts, which had peaked at 33.

The release of "My Delirium" followed the release of "Dusk Till Dawn", which only managed to chart in the United Kingdom at a peak of number 78. "Paris is Burning" was the most successful release previously – it had been featured on the TV show Ugly Betty, and peaked at number 40 on the New Zealand charts. Following the release of "My Delirium", "Paris is Burning" was re-released and outperformed its previous chart positions.

== Charts ==
Chart	Peak position
Australian Singles Chart	8
Belgian (Flanders) Singles Chart	60
Denmark Singles Chart	36
European Hot 100	92
New Zealand Singles Chart	9
UK Singles Chart	33

=== Year-end charts ===
Chart (2009)	Position
Australian Singles Chart	41
New Zealand Singles Chart	42

== Certifications ==
Region	Certification	Certified units/sales
Australia (ARIA)	Platinum	70,000^{^}
New Zealand (RMNZ)	2× Platinum	60,000^{‡}
United Kingdom (BPI)	Silver	200,000^{‡}
^{^} Shipments figures based on certification alone.^{‡} Sales+streaming figures based on certification alone.

== Track listing ==
1. "My Delirium"
2. "My Delirium" (Sunship Remix)
3. "My Delirium" (Sugardaddy Remix)
4. "My Delirium" (Chateau Marmont Remix)
