= Ladyhawke (album) =

Studio album by Ladyhawke
- Released: 19 September 2008
- Recorded: 2007–2008
- Genres: New wave; synth-pop; indie rock
- Length: 43:29
- Label: Modular
- Producers: Michael Di Francesco; Jim Eliot; Pascal Gabriel; Paul Harris; Kid Gloves; Greg Kurstin

Ladyhawke chronology
Ladyhawke (2008)	Anxiety (2012)

Alternative cover
- US special edition cover

Singles from Ladyhawke
- 1. "Back of the Van" Released: 1 April 2008; 2. "Paris Is Burning" Released: 6 July 2008; 3. "Dusk Till Dawn" Released: 8 September 2008; 4. "My Delirium" Released: 8 December 2008; 5. "Magic" Released: 28 September 2009

Ladyhawke is the debut studio album by New Zealand singer and songwriter Ladyhawke. It was released on 19 September 2008 by Modular Recordings. Featuring production by Pascal Gabriel, Greg Kurstin, Kid Gloves, Kish Mauve's Jim Eliot, Paul Harris and Van She's Michael Di Francesco, the album incorporates 1980s-influenced new wave and synth-pop, as well as indie rock. It was promoted by five singles: "Back of the Van", "Paris Is Burning", "Dusk Till Dawn", "My Delirium" and "Magic".

Ladyhawke received generally positive reviews from music critics, who commended Ladyhawke for her ability to reproduce the music of the 1980s. The album reached number one on the New Zealand Albums Chart and was certified platinum by the Recording Industry Association of New Zealand (RIANZ). It also charted at number 16 in Australia and the United Kingdom, receiving gold certifications in both countries. The album won six awards at the 2009 New Zealand Music Awards—the most awards won since 2004—and two at the ARIA Music Awards of 2009.

== Album cover ==
The cover artwork is a watercolor painting by Sydney-based illustrator and painter Sarah Larnach of a loosely dressed Ladyhawke intently playing a NES on an unseen television. Also visible are three cats, a Super NES controller, a Genesis console, a microKORG synthesiser, and a NES Zapper holstered in her underwear.

== Singles ==
The album's lead single, "Back of the Van", was originally released as a digital download in 2008. It was re-released in the UK on 19 May 2009, reaching number 93 on the UK Singles Chart. "Paris Is Burning" was released on 30 June 2008 as the second single from the album, peaking at number 40 in New Zealand, number 52 in Australia and number 61 in the UK. Following a reissue on 2 March 2009, "Paris Is Burning" reached a new peak position of number 47 on the UK Singles Chart.

"Dusk Till Dawn" was released as the third single on 15 September 2008, peaking at number 78 on the UK Singles Chart. "My Delirium" was released on 8 December 2008 as the album's fourth single. The song became Ladyhawke's best-performing single to date, charting at number eight in Australia, number nine in New Zealand, number 19 in the UK and number 36 in Denmark. "Magic" was released on 28 September 2009 as the album's fifth and final single. It became Ladyhawke's second highest-peaking single in New Zealand, reaching number 31, while failing to chart in the UK.

== Critical reception ==
Professional ratings
Aggregate scores
Source	Rating
Metacritic	70/100
Review scores
Source	Rating
AllMusic	4/5 stars
The Guardian	4/5 stars
The Independent	Favourable
NME	8/10
The Observer	4/5 stars
Pitchfork	6.6/10
PopMatters	5/10
Rolling Stone	2.5/5 stars
Spin	8/10
The Sunday Times	4/5 stars

Ladyhawke received generally positive reviews from music critics. At Metacritic, which assigns a normalised rating out of 100 to reviews from mainstream publications, the album received an average score of 70, based on 17 reviews. Ben Preece of Time Off lauded the album as "a glorious ride through 80s-flavoured pop, electro-fused beats and brilliantly infectious melodies". Simon Price of The Independent noted that the album is "simultaneously very then and very now: it couldn't have been made any later than 1985, or any earlier than 2001." Dan Cairns of The Sunday Times wrote, "Each of the 13 tracks has a chorus to kill for, and Brown's voice—Kim Wilde meets PJ Harvey—features an end-of-phrase exhalation that is sex on a microphone stand." Jon O'Brien of AllMusic felt that "despite its blatant retro vibe, [the album] still manages to sound fresh thanks to its clever production and Brown's fiery and vibrant vocals." Nadine O'Regan of Spin praised the album as "a confection of synth-infused, mammoth-chorused tunes that sound surprisingly and thrillingly fresh", adding that "[t]he trick lies in Brown's blissfully irony-free attitude: Through the digital wizardry and pumping beats, you can hear an unabashedly heartfelt and occasionally vulnerable artist."

The Guardian's Jude Rogers raved that "Magic" "may be the best opening track on any album this year", while describing tracks like "Dusk Till Dawn", "My Delirium" and "Another Runaway" as "monumental". Elvissia Williams of BBC Music compared the album to John Hughes' 1985 teen film The Breakfast Club and stated that "Ladyhawke's genius lays in her ability to distill the *spirit* of Brat Pack-era America—its innocence, its wide-eyed euphoria, its unshakeable faith in happy endings." Mark Beaumont of NME opined that Ladyhawke's "louche synthetic pop is brazenly Bananarama, ridiculously Rio, and wonderfully [Pete] Waterman, but the lack of posing—her sheer scruffiness—makes it the first credible '80s pop record since ABC's The Lexicon of Love." At The Observer, Peter Robinson viewed the album as "an accessible but immensely rewarding listen, and while some of this singer's influences may be middle of the road, her album isn't even on the road. It's storming across the desert on a nice red motorbike." Pitchfork's Mike Orme commented that "Ladyhawke is brimming with ideas whose worst moments quantify this past and whose best build upon it." Despite dubbing Ladyhawke a "skillful craftswoman", Rolling Stone's Jody Rosen concluded that "as with so much Eighties revivalism, there is a chilly emptiness to the exercise; most of the songs feel like fashion statements." Similarly, Emily Tartanella of PopMatters found the album to be "willfully, occasionally wonderfully, over-the-top. But it's all style, and no substance, and so without the style, well, there's really nothing there."

=== Accolades ===
The album earned Ladyhawke six New Zealand Music Awards in 2009 for Album of the Year, Single of the Year for "My Delirium", Best Female Solo Artist, Breakthrough Artist of the Year, Best Dance/Electronica Album and International Achievement Award (shared with Brooke Fraser), in addition to a nomination for Peoples' Choice Award. This was the most awards won at a ceremony since 2004, when rapper Scribe also won six. At the ARIA Music Awards of 2009, she won Breakthrough Artist – Album and Breakthrough Artist – Single for "My Delirium", and was nominated for Single of the Year for "My Delirium", Best Female Artist, Best Pop Release and Best Cover Art.

== Commercial performance ==
The album debuted at number 15 in Ladyhawke's native New Zealand, reaching number one for one week the following year, on 19 October 2009. It spent 40 non-consecutive weeks on the chart and earned a platinum certification from the Recording Industry Association of New Zealand (RIANZ) on 20 December 2009, denoting shipments of over 15,000 copies. In Australia, Ladyhawke debuted and peaked at number 16 on the ARIA Albums Chart, slipping to number 28 the following week. The album spent 25 non-consecutive weeks in the top 50 and was eventually certified gold by the Australian Recording Industry Association (ARIA), selling over 35,000 copies.

Ladyhawke entered the UK Albums Chart at number 47, falling off the top 100 the following week. Following the release of "My Delirium" and the reissue of "Paris Is Burning", the album made a re-entry at number 95 on 4 January 2009, reaching a new peak position of number 16 on the chart beginning 3 May 2009. On 17 April 2009, the album was certified gold by the British Phonographic Industry (BPI) for shipments in excess of 100,000 copies.

== Track listing ==
No.	Title	Writer(s)	Producer(s)	Length
1.	"Magic"	Phillipa Brown; Pascal Gabriel	Gabriel	3:27
2.	"Manipulating Woman"	Brown; Roy Kerr; Anu Pillai	Kid Gloves	3:35
3.	"My Delirium"	Brown; Gabriel; Alex Gray; Hannah Robinson	Gabriel	4:16
4.	"Better Than Sunday"	Brown; Paul Harris; Jim Eliot	Harris; Eliot	3:28
5.	"Another Runaway"	Brown; Gabriel; Gray	Gabriel	3:16
6.	"Love Don't Live Here"	Brown; Eliot	Eliot	4:03
7.	"Back of the Van"	Brown; Michael Di Francesco	Di Francesco	3:40
8.	"Paris Is Burning"	Brown; Kerr; Pillai	Kid Gloves	3:49
9.	"Professional Suicide"	Brown; Greg Kurstin	Kurstin	3:43
10.	"Dusk Till Dawn"	Brown; Gabriel; Gray; Robinson	Gabriel	2:37
11.	"Crazy World"	Brown; Eliot	Eliot	3:35
12.	"Morning Dreams"	Brown; Gabriel	Gabriel	4:00

UK edition bonus track
No.	Title	Writer(s)	Producer(s)	Length
11.	"Oh My" (placed between "Dusk Till Dawn" and "Crazy World")	Brown; Gabriel Olegavich	Olegavich	3:24

Japanese edition bonus tracks
No.	Title	Writer(s)	Length
13.	"Back of the Van" (Van She Tech Turbo Fire Engine)	Brown; Di Francesco	6:02
14.	"Paris Is Burning" (Cut Copy Remix)	Brown; Kerr; Pillai	5:24
15.	"Paris Is Burning" (Peaches Remix)	Brown; Kerr; Pillai	5:20
16.	"Dusk Till Dawn" (The Shoes Remix)	Brown; Gabriel; Gray; Robinson	4:08

Oceania collector's edition and US special edition bonus tracks
No.	Title	Writer(s)	Producer(s)	Length
13.	"Oh My"	Brown; Olegavich	Olegavich	3:24
14.	"Danny & Jenny"	Brown; Gabriel	Gabriel	3:33
15.	"Paris Is Burning" (acoustic)	Brown; Kerr; Pillai		4:09
16.	"Dusk Till Dawn" (acoustic)	Brown; Gabriel; Gray; Robinson		2:42
17.	"My Delirium" (acoustic)	Brown; Gabriel; Gray; Robinson		4:42

== Personnel ==
Credits adapted from the liner notes of Ladyhawke.

=== Musicians ===
- Pip Brown – lead vocals, backing vocals (all tracks); electric guitar (tracks 2, 8); guitars (tracks 3–5, 7, 9–12); bass guitar (tracks 3, 11, 12); bass (track 4); drums, synth (track 7); keyboards (track 9)
- Pascal Gabriel – keyboards, drums, percussions (tracks 1, 3, 5, 10, 12); guitars (tracks 1, 3, 5, 10); bass synth (tracks 1, 10, 12); piano (track 12)
- Roy Kerr – programming (tracks 2, 8); drums (track 8)
- Anu Pillai – bass guitar, keyboards, programming (tracks 2, 8); drums (track 8)
- Peter Huntington – drums (track 2)
- Alex Gray – keyboards (tracks 3, 5, 10); guitars (track 3); percussions (track 5); Rhodes (track 10)
- Hannah Robinson – backing vocals (tracks 3, 10)
- Paul Harris – keyboards, drums (track 4)
- Jim Eliot – keyboards (tracks 4, 6, 11); drums (track 4)
- Leo Taylor – drums (tracks 6, 11)
- Michael Di Francesco – bass guitar, synth (track 7)
- Greg Kurstin – keyboards, programming (track 9)

=== Technical ===
- Pascal Gabriel – production, recording engineering (tracks 1, 5, 10); recording (tracks 3, 12); mixing (track 10)
- Tony "Miami" Hoffer – mixing (tracks 1, 8)
- Jason Gossman – mix assistance (tracks 1, 8)
- Kid Gloves – production, engineering (tracks 2, 8)
- Antonio Feola – recording engineering (track 2)
- Tom Elmhirst – mixing (tracks 2–7, 9, 11, 12)
- Dan Parry – mix assistance (tracks 2–7, 9, 11, 12); engineering assistance (track 3)
- Paul Harris – production, recording (track 4)
- Jim Eliot – production, recording (tracks 4, 6, 11)
- Michael Di Francesco – production, recording (track 7)
- Greg Kurstin – production, engineering (track 9)
- Pip Brown – executive production

=== Artwork ===
- Sarah Larnach – art direction, artwork
- Pip Brown – art direction

== Charts ==
=== Weekly charts ===
Chart (2008–09)	Peak position
Australian Albums (ARIA)	16
European Albums (Billboard)	62
New Zealand Albums (RMNZ)	1
Scottish Albums (Official Charts)	14
UK Albums (Official Charts)	16
US Heatseekers Albums (Billboard)	41

=== Year-end charts ===
Chart (2009)	Position
Australian Albums (ARIA)	84
New Zealand Albums (RMNZ)	34
UK Albums (OCC)	103

== Certifications ==
Region	Certification	Certified units/sales
Australia (ARIA)	Gold	35,000^{^}
New Zealand (RMNZ)	Platinum	15,000^{^}
United Kingdom (BPI)	Gold	100,000^{^}
^{^} Shipments figures based on certification alone.

== Release history ==
Region	Date	Edition	Label	Ref.
Australia	19 September 2008	Standard	Modular	
New Zealand	22 September 2008	Standard	Modular	
United Kingdom	22 September 2008	Standard	Island	
Germany	23 September 2008	Standard	Universal	
United States	18 November 2008	Standard	Modular	
Japan	17 December 2008	Standard	Universal	
Australia	10 April 2009	Collector's	Modular	
New Zealand	13 April 2009	Collector's	Modular	
United States	31 August 2009	Special	Decca; Modular	
