= Sliding Doors =

- Theatrical release poster
- Directed by: Peter Howitt
- Written by: Peter Howitt
- Produced by: Sydney Pollack; Philippa Braithwaite
- Starring: Gwyneth Paltrow; John Hannah; John Lynch; Jeanne Tripplehorn
- Cinematography: Remi Adefarasin
- Edited by: John Smith
- Music by: David Hirschfelder
- Production companies: Intermedia; Mirage Enterprises
- Distributed by: Miramax Films (United States); Paramount Pictures (Select territories; through United International Pictures); Intermedia (International)
- Release dates: January 26, 1998 (Sundance Film Festival); April 24, 1998 (United States); May 1, 1998 (United Kingdom)
- Running time: 99 minutes
- Countries: United Kingdom; United States
- Language: English
- Budget: $6 million
- Box office: $67 million

Sliding Doors is a 1998 romantic comedy-drama film written and directed by Peter Howitt. It stars Gwyneth Paltrow and features John Hannah, John Lynch and Jeanne Tripplehorn. The film alternates between two storylines, showing two paths the central character's life could take depending on whether she catches a train. It has drawn numerous comparisons to Polish director Krzysztof Kieślowski's 1987 film Blind Chance, the outcome of which also hinges on whether the protagonist catches a train.

Sliding Doors premiered at the Sundance Film Festival on January 26, 1998, before being released on April 24, 1998, by Miramax Films in the United States and on May 1, 1998, by Paramount Pictures (through United International Pictures) in the United Kingdom. The film received mixed reviews from critics and grossed $67 million against a $6 million budget.

== Plot ==
Helen Quilley is sacked from her public relations firm. As she leaves the office building, she drops an earring in the lift, and a man picks it up for her. She rushes downstairs to the London Underground, when a young girl slightly delays her, and the sliding doors shut before she can board the train. Time seems to rewind and restart, but this time the girl's mother pulls her child out of Helen's path downstairs, and Helen forces open the nearly closed sliding doors to board the train. Two different versions of Helen continue on with their lives, alternating between two diverging stories.

In the first storyline, Helen, having boarded the train, sits beside James, the man who had picked up her earring in the lift, and they strike up a conversation that cheers her up. She gets home to catch her boyfriend Gerry in bed with his American ex-girlfriend, Lydia. Helen leaves him and moves in with her friend Anna. At Anna's suggestion, Helen cuts her hair short and dyes it blonde to make a fresh start.

James befriends Helen and she begins to move on from Gerry as he cheers her up and encourages her to start her own small PR firm. They fall in love, despite her reservations about beginning another relationship so soon after her ugly breakup with Gerry. Eventually, Helen discovers that she is pregnant by James. She goes to see him at his office and is stunned to learn from James's secretary that he is married.

Having discovered that Helen has learned he is married, James searches frantically for her before finding her on a bridge and explaining that while he is married, they are separated and will soon be divorced, and that he and his wife maintain the appearance of a happy marriage for the sake of his sick mother. After she and James reconcile and declare their love, Helen walks into the road and is hit by a van.

In the second storyline, Helen, having missed the train, is further delayed by an attempted mugging, which leads to a hospital visit where the cut to her forehead is treated. She arrives home after Lydia has left, and remains oblivious to Gerry's infidelity. Unable to find another PR position, she takes two part-time jobs to pay the bills to support Gerry, who is unemployed and struggling to finish his novel. He continues to juggle the two women in his life, and Helen gradually becomes suspicious. She discovers she is pregnant but does not tell Gerry.

Lydia soon realizes Gerry will never leave Helen for her and angrily breaks things off with him, to Gerry's relief. Lydia also realizes she is pregnant by Gerry and summons Helen under the guise of a job interview, but instead reveals the affair and her pregnancy to Helen. Distraught, Helen flees and falls down the stairs.

In both timelines, Helen is taken to the hospital and loses her baby. The Helen who boarded the train succumbs to severe injuries and dies with James at her bedside, expressing his gratitude at meeting her on the train. The Helen who missed the train recovers and tells Gerry to leave for good. James, who is visiting his mother, picks up Helen's dropped earring in the hospital lift, encouraging her to "Cheer up. You know what the Monty Python boys say..." (the same joke he told Helen in the other timeline), but this time, she preempts James, correctly quoting the punch line, "No-one expects the Spanish Inquisition." They turn and gaze at each other.

== Cast ==
- Gwyneth Paltrow as Helen Quilley
- John Hannah as James Hammerton
- John Lynch as Gerald Flannigan (Gerry)
- Zara Turner as Anna
- Douglas McFerran as Russell
- Jeanne Tripplehorn as Lydia
- Paul Brightwell as Clive
- Nina Young as Claudia
- Virginia McKenna as Mrs. Hammerton
- Kevin McNally as Paul
- Peter Howitt as Cheeky Bloke
- Christopher Villiers as Steve

== Production ==
Principal photography, which took nearly two months, commenced on April 1, 1997, and concluded on May 28. The scenes on the London Underground were filmed at Waterloo tube station and Bank station on the Waterloo & City line and at Fulham Broadway tube station on the District line. Helen's flat is in Leinster Square. The American diner is Fatboy's Diner situated at Old Spitalfields Market. The scenes by the Thames were filmed next to Hammersmith Bridge and in the Blue Anchor pub in Hammersmith. The bridge featured is the Albert Bridge between Battersea and Chelsea. The late-night scene when Paltrow and Hannah walk down the street was filmed in Primrose Gardens (formerly Stanley Gardens) in Belsize Park. The final hospital scene where Helen and James meet in the lift was filmed at Chelsea and Westminster Hospital on Fulham Road.

== Soundtrack ==
1. Blair – "Have Fun, Go Mad"
2. Elton John – "Bennie and the Jets" [*]
3. Elton John – "Honky Cat"
4. Aimee Mann – "Amateur"
5. Those Magnificent Men – "Call Me a Fool", "Got a Thing About You" [*]
6. Peach Union – "On My Own"
7. Aqua – "Turn Back Time"
8. Abra Moore – "Don't Feel Like Cryin'"
9. Dodgy – "Good Enough"
10. Space Monkeys – "Drug Soup"
11. Jamiroquai – "Use the Force"
12. Olive – "Miracle"
13. Patty Larkin – "Coming Up For Air" [*]
14. The Brand New Heavies – "More Love"
15. Dido – "Thank You"
16. Patty Larkin – "Tenderness on the Block" [*]
- Asterisk indicates song was not included on the soundtrack album.

British singer Dido's song "Thank You", which plays during the end credits, became a hit over two years later in 2000, hitting No. 3 on the Billboard Hot 100 chart. Record producer The 45 King heard the song in the film and looped the opening lines and added a bassline; he sent the result to Interscope Records, where it was used on the Eminem song "Stan", as Eminem interpreted the lines as being about stalking. Aqua's song "Turn Back Time" was released as a single in 1998 and topped the UK Singles Chart. The music video is heavily based on the film and featured scenes from it. The Patty Larkin cover of "Tenderness on the Block" that plays during the final scene was never released due to copyright and recording issues.

== Reception ==
=== Box office ===
The film opened at number 17 at the US box office with $834,817 during its first weekend but increased by 96.5% to $1,640,438 on its second weekend. It ended up with a total gross of $11,841,544 in the United States and Canada. It also saw success in the United Kingdom and was the highest-grossing local production for the year with a total box office gross in excess of £12 million. The film's total worldwide takings totaled over $67 million.

=== Critical response ===
Rotten Tomatoes gives the film a 65% approval rating based on 54 reviews, with an average rating of 6.3/10. The critics consensus reads, "Despite the gimmicky feel of the split narratives, the movie is watchable due to the winning performances by the cast." Metacritic gives the film a score of 59 out of 100 based on 23 reviews, indicating the reaction as "mixed or average." Time Out described the film as "essentially a romantic comedy with a nifty gimmick". Angie Errigo of Empire gave the film 3/5 stars. Roger Ebert gave it 2/4 stars, and was critical of the screenplay.

== In popular culture ==
The thirteenth episode of season eight of Frasier, "Sliding Frasiers", is inspired by the film. In it, Frasier struggles deciding whether to wear a suit or a sweater to an upcoming Valentine's Day speed-dating event. The aftereffects of either decision are explored, although the episode ends identically with both timelines intersecting as Frasier, having failed to get a date, drives to a caller's workplace to woo her. The Broad City season 4 episode "Sliding Doors" shows the origin story of Abbi and Ilana's friendship cut between two timelines. In both scenarios, they meet at a New York subway station. From there, one story involves them boarding a subway train and going through the day separately. In the other, they miss their train and they spend the day together.

The Unbreakable Kimmy Schmidt season 4 episode "Sliding Van Doors" centers on the film, showing an alternate timeline where Kimmy Schmidt does not get in her kidnapper's van in 1998 because she does not want to miss a screening of Sliding Doors. Other shows to use a premise similar to Sliding Doors, but without directly referencing the film, include Doctor Who and Malcolm in the Middle.

== See also ==
- Time loop
- Sliding doors moment
- Bowling (Malcolm in the Middle)
