= S'Express =

British dance music group

- Origin: London, England
- Genre: House
- Years active: 1988–1994
- Labels: Capitol; EMI; Rhythm King; Sire; Warner Bros.
- Past members: Mark Moore; Pascal Gabriel; Jocasta; Mark D; Michellé; Linda Love; Sonique

S'Express (pronounced ess-express; sometimes spelled S'Xpress or S-Express) was a British dance music act from the late 1980s and early 1990s, who had one of the earliest commercial successes in the acid house genre.

"Theme from S'Express", which contained elements from Rose Royce's "Is It Love You're After", was one of the earliest recordings to capitalize on the emergence of sampling culture. The song went to number one in the UK Singles Chart for two weeks in April 1988. It made the Hot Dance Club Play chart in the US (also scraping into the U.S. Billboard Hot 100 at number 91). In 2016 Mark Moore released a remix album called Enjoy This Trip which retooled S’Express’s music for the 21st century through working with guests such as Punks Jump Up and Chris & Cosey.

== Biography ==
The main player in the act was disc jockey and producer Mark Moore. In 1989, the group released its debut album, Original Soundtrack, which featured a line-up of Moore, Pascal Gabriel, Jocasta, Mark D, Linda Love, and Michellé. The album consisted of slightly longer versions of S-Express's "Theme", its follow-up hits "Superfly Guy" (UK No. 5) and a cover version of Sly and the Family Stone's "Hey Music Lover" (UK No. 6; its b-side was remixed by minimalist composer Philip Glass).

By the release of the second album Intercourse, the act was reduced to a duo of Moore with new vocalist and DJ Sonique. Although not as successful as its debut, Intercourse spawned several mid-charting UK singles and club hits, including "Nothing to Lose", co-written with Martin Gordon, as were several other tunes on the record. Sonique, already a successful DJ, eventually embarked on a solo career and produced one of the biggest club hits of the late 1990s ("It Feels So Good"). Moore went on to release many singles, remixes and albums on his own and also formed the band Needledust.

== Discography ==
=== Albums ===
==== Studio albums ====
Title	Album details	Peak chart positions								Certifications
Title	Album details	UK	UK Indie	AUS	FIN	GER	NL	NZ	SWE	Certifications
Original Soundtrack	Released: 20 March 1989; Label: Rhythm King, Capitol; Formats: CD, LP, MC	5	1	69	19	58	85	41	31	UK: Gold
Intercourse	Released: August 1991; Label: Rhythm King, Sire; Formats: CD, LP, MC	—	—	—	—	—	—	—	—	
Enjoy This Trip	Released: 27 May 2016; Label: Needle Boss; Formats: CD, digital download	—	—	—	—	—	—	—	—	
"—" denotes releases that did not chart or were not released in that territory.

==== Compilation albums ====
Title	Album details
Ultimate S'Express	Released: August 1998; Label: BMG/Camden; Formats: CD
Themes from S'Express – The Best Of	Released: February 2004; Label: BMG; Formats: CD

=== EPs ===
Title	Album details	Peak chart positions	
Title	Album details	UK	AUS
Find 'Em, Fool 'Em	Released: May 1992; Label: Rhythm King; Formats: CD, 12"	43	179
Excursions	Released: 9 October 2015; Label: Needle Boss; Formats: 12", digital download	—	—
"—" denotes releases that did not chart.

=== Singles ===
Title	Year	Peak chart positions											Certifications	Album
Title	Year	UK	AUS	BEL (FL)	GER	FIN	IRE	NL	NZ	SWI	US	US Dance	Certifications	Album
"Theme from S'Express"	1988	1	11	1	2	2	2	2	7	1	91	1	UK: Silver	Original Soundtrack
"Superfly Guy"	1988	5	35	12	13	2	8	15	12	11	—	2		Original Soundtrack
"Hey Music Lover"	1989	6	53	31	29	12	6	33	31	25	—	6		Original Soundtrack
"Mantra for a State of Mind"	1989	21	141	—	—	14	12	—	—	—	—	—		Intercourse
"Nothing to Lose"	1990	32	—	—	—	—	15	—	—	—	—	9		Intercourse
"Find 'Em, Fool 'Em, Forget 'Em"	1991	43	—	—	—	—	—	—	—	—	—	—		Intercourse
"Theme from S'Express – The Return Trip" (Note: Remixes by Tony De Vit, Aquarius and Carl Craig available in Australia through Central Station Records (also released in the UK and Europe through Rhythm King), and accredited to Mark Moore presents S'Express.)	1996	14	42	—	—	—	—	24	—	—	—	—		Non-album singles
"Stupid Little Girls" (Note: Initially only released in France as a 12" single.)	2008	—	—	—	—	—	—	—	—	—	—	—		Non-album singles
"Last Mission Helsinki" (as Eon vs S'Express)	2010	—	—	—	—	—	—	—	—	—	—	—		Non-album singles
"Funky Killer" (Red Snapper remix)	2016	—	—	—	—	—	—	—	—	—	—	—		Non-album singles
"Sneakin'" (as S'Express x Lady Bunny x T-Total)	2021	—	—	—	—	—	—	—	—	—	—	—		Non-album singles
"—" denotes releases that did not chart or were not released in that territory.
