= Back of the Van =

Single by Ladyhawke

from the album Ladyhawke
- Released: 1 April 2008
- Genre: Synth-pop; indie rock
- Length: 3:40
- Label: Modular
- Songwriter(s): Phillipa Brown; Michael Di Francesco
- Producer(s): Michael Di Francesco

Ladyhawke singles chronology
"Back of the Van" (2008)	"Paris Is Burning" (2008)

Music video
- "Back of the Van" on YouTube

"Back of the Van" is the debut single by New Zealand singer Ladyhawke from her self-titled debut studio album (2008). The song was written by Ladyhawke and Michael Di Francesco. It was released on 1 April 2008 as the album's lead single digitally from Ladyhawke's website and Myspace. The track was re-released on 18 May 2009 as a limited-edition single.

== Critical reception ==
Female First gave the song a positive review and has given it a four-out-of-five-star rating using the public vote. They wrote: "The result is a refreshing blend of rock, dance and pop. As well as writing 'Back of the Van', Pip also plays the drums, guitar and synth on the track".

BBC Music wrote this about the song while reviewing her debut album: "while the utterly uplifting 'Back of the Van' is a tribute to just saying how you feel. As Ladyhawke reaches nervously for her new lover's hand it's impossible not to join in her sweet, unvarnished declaration, You set me on fire".

Exclaim! wrote: "Brown unites her retro influences (classic rock, '80s dance, '00s rehashing of everything in the past) to mould her own unique lovechild. 'Back of the Van' is one of the catchiest songs I've heard so far in 2008, evoking the spirit of Fleetwood Mac and spinning disco much better than that half-assed remix of 'Dreams' by Deep Dish".

== Music video ==
The video starts by looking up into space and then goes down to see Ladyhawke playing her guitar. Then everything goes blue, but Ladyhawke continues to play her guitar. Things start to move and you see an eye while Ladyhawke keeps turning back to look at something. She continues to play her guitar while the people moving are now clearly dancing around. There is what appears to be fire but turns out to be her outline. While she sings, you start to see more than one of her; also a light starts to shine on her. You see shadows dancing while lights shine onto them. While Ladyhawke sings you see other people run across the screen. The video ends with Ladyhawke singing and fades into the darkness.

== Track listing ==
- Promotional CD single
1. "Back of the Van" (Original) – 3:41
2. "Back of the Van" (Radio Edit) – 3:17
3. "Back of the Van" (A1 Bassline) – 6:28
4. "Back of the Van" (Van She Tech Remix) – 6:04
5. "Back of the Van" (Wawa Remix) – 6:48
6. "Back of the Van" (Wawa Edit) – 3:19
7. "Back of the Van" (Fred Falke Valvestate Mix) – 6:37
8. "Back of the Van" (Fred Falke Ultimate Mix) – 6:41
9. "Back of the Van" (Mock and Toof Mix) – 7:46

== Charts ==
Chart (2009)	Peak position
UK Singles (OCC)	93
