= Teenager (band) =

Australian musical duo

- Origin: Sydney, New South Wales, Australia
- Genres: Art rock, dance-punk
- Years active: 2004–2007, 2021, 2025
- Labels: Timberyard, Godlike and Electric
- Past members: Nick Littlemore; Pip Brown

Teenager is an Australian duo formed in 2004 by Nick Littlemore as a side project from his electronic dance group Pnau, and Phillipa "Pip" Brown (later known as Ladyhawke) on guitar (former member of New Zealand band Two Lane Blacktop).

Their debut album Thirteen was released in 2006 before disbanding in 2007. In 2021, a single "Before the End" was released, and in 2025, the duo re-emerged from dormancy with an EP Fourteen

== History ==
=== 2004-2007: Thirteen ===
Teenager was formed in 2004 in Sydney by Nick Littlemore as a side-project to his main group Pnau which had released their second album Again in October 2003. Phillipa "Pip" Brown had left her native New Zealand after the disbandment of her hard rock group Two Lane Blacktop in 2003. Originally living in Melbourne, Brown was contacted by Littlemore who asked her to join on lead guitar. Littlemore was the lead vocalist and keyboardist.

In 2006 Teenager issued their debut single, "Pony" on the independent label, Timberyard Records. It was followed by the album, Thirteen and the related single "Bound and Gagged". The album had been recorded over three years in studios in Sydney, London, New York, Paris and Los Angeles. For the album the duo of Brown and Littlemore used Sonic Youth's Lee Ranaldo (on guitar) and Steve Shelley (on drums), and Thierry Muller (on synthesiser) as session musicians. Additional musicians include Luke Steele (of Sleepy Jackson), Kim Moyes (The Presets), and guitarist Rowland S. Howard. Littlemore's Pnau bandmate Peter Mayes mixed seven of the ten tracks.

Mess + Noise's Craig Mathieson described the album as "a pop record, albeit a particularly exotic species that equally suggests creative guile and hints of self-indulgence ... 'Pony' is the closest the album comes to cheap genre holidaying, approximating rock attitude when the organic and desperate growth of 'Bound and Gagged' is so much more impressive". Brown and Littlemore co-wrote "Alone Again" and "West" for Teenager.

From late 2006 Teenager performed live with a line-up of Brown, Littlemore, Deano Cameron on bass guitar and Oscar Wuts on drums (both ex-Degrees.K, a New Zealand band). They undertook an east coast tour in April 2007. In September 2007 Teenager issued "Bound & Gagged" in the United Kingdom on Godlike and Electric and Thirteen followed there in October. Gigwise's Luisa Mateus found the duo "bring lascivious grooves to a seductively orientated debut, titled 'Thirteen' ... [it] draws on fast paced musical formations, a mismatch of sounds, poppy in places, but mainly littered with dirty but enthralling bass lines, sexually charged guitar rifts and sass by the bucket load". By that time Littlemore had returned to recording with his main group which issued their third album, Pnau in December 2007. Brown left to concentrate on her career as Ladyhawke.

=== 2021: ===
In 2021, a single "Before the End" was released.

=== 2024-present: Fourteen ===
In the years since 2007, Littlemore and Ladyhawke continued to write and record together between tours, and albums.

In May 2025, Teenager released the track "A.A.". This was followed by the EP Fourteen in October 2025.

== Discography ==
=== Albums ===
List of albums, with selected details
Title	Details
Thirteen	Released: 2006; Label: Timberyard Records (T 101106); Format: CD

=== EPs ===
List of eps, with selected details
Title	Details
Fourteen	Expected: 10 October 2025; Label: etcetc; Format: digital
