= Time Flies (Ladyhawke album) =

Studio album by Ladyhawke
- Released: 19 November 2021
- Recorded: 2019–2021
- Studio: Roundhead Studios
- Length: 39:00
- Label: Mid Century; BMG
- Producer: Tommy English; Josh Fountain

Ladyhawke chronology
Wild Things (2016)	Time Flies (2021)

Singles from Time Flies
- 1. "Guilty Love" Released: 5 March 2021; 2. "Mixed Emotions" Released: 27 May 2021

Time Flies is the fourth studio album from New Zealand singer-songwriter Ladyhawke. The album was released on 19 November 2021 by Mid Century Records with distribution by BMG.

== Background ==
Soon after the release of her 2016 album Wild Things, Ladyhawke moved back to her native New Zealand from Los Angeles. In the interim, Ladyhawke married and gave birth to her daughter, Billie Jean. Months after giving birth, Ladyhawke suffered from postpartum depression and was subsequently diagnosed with melanoma. Ladyhawke sought treatment for both and recovered before recording Time Flies. To celebrate the album's release, Ladyhawke released a limited edition Game Boy cartridge. The game takes Ladyhawke on a quest to complete the album.

== Reception ==
Professional ratings
Aggregate scores
Source	Rating
Metacritic	70/100
Review scores
Source	Rating
AllMusic	3.5/5 stars
iNews	3/5 stars
The Line of Best Fit	7/10
MusicOMH	4/5 stars
Muzic.net.nz	4/5 stars

Time Flies received generally favourable reviews from music critics. At Metacritic, which assigns a normalised rating out of 100 to reviews from professional critics, the album received a weighted average score of 70, based on four reviews.

In a review for AllMusic, critic reviewer Heather Phares wrote: "Shaped by her anxiety and postpartum depression - and the treatment she sought for both - Brown's fourth album uses a light touch when it comes to potentially heavy emotions. Time Flies sparkly grab bag of sounds underscores that she never makes music strictly by the numbers."

== Track listing ==
Time Flies track listing
No.	Title	Writer(s)	Length
1.	"My Love"	Phillipa Brown; Josh Fountain	3:29
2.	"Think About You"	Brown; Fountain	3:24
3.	"Time Flies"	Brown; Tommy English	3:54
4.	"Mixed Emotions"	Brown; Nick Littlemore; Jono Sloan	3:34
5.	"Guilty Love" (featuring Broods)	Brown; English; Georgia Nott	3:00
6.	"Take It Easy Mama"	Brown; Chris Stacey	3:23
7.	"Loner"	Brown; Fountain	3:51
8.	"Adam"	Brown; English	3:49
9.	"Reactor"	Brown; English	3:33
10.	"Walk Away"	Brown; Fountain	3:43
11.	"Love Is Blind"	Brown; English	3:28
Total length:			39:00

== Personnel ==
- Pip Brown – vocals
- Tommy English, Josh Fountain – producer
- Jeremy Toy – mixer
- Dave Cooley – mastering
- Sarah Larnach – artwork direction and design
- Lula Cucchiara – album cover and sleeve photography

== Charts ==
Chart performance for Time Flies
Chart (2021)	Peak position
Scottish Albums (OCC)	100
UK Album Downloads (OCC)	57
UK Independent Albums (OCC)	31
