= Theme from S-Express =

1988 single by S'Express

Single by S'Express

from the album Original Soundtrack
- Released: April 1988
- Recorded: 1988
- Genre: Acid house; Eurodisco
- Length: 3:55
- Label: Rhythm King; Capitol
- Songwriters: Mark Moore; Pascal Gabriel
- Producers: Mark Moore; Pascal Gabriel

S'Express singles chronology
"Theme from S-Express" (1988)	"Superfly Guy" (1988)

Music video
- "Theme from S-Express" on YouTube

Alternative cover
- "Theme from S-Xpress — The Return Trip" cover (1996)

"Theme from S-Express" is an acid house song by British electronic dance music group S'Express, from their debut studio album, Original Soundtrack (1989), written and produced by Mark Moore and Pascal Gabriel. One of the landmarks of early acid house and late 1980s sampling culture, the single was released by Rhythm King and Capitol, and became a hit upon its release in April 1988, peaking at number one on the UK Singles Chart for two weeks. It also topped the charts in Belgium, Greece, Luxembourg and Switzerland. In the United States, it reached number 91 on the Billboard Hot 100 and number one on the Billboard Dance Club Play chart. "Theme from S-Express" additionally peaked at number 11 in Australia and number two in West Germany, France and the Netherlands.

== Production ==
The song samples liberally from many other works, including heavy usage of Rose Royce's "Is It Love You're After", and TZ's "I Got the Hots for You", which provided the song's campy hook. The song used the line "Drop that ghetto blaster" prominently from the song "Tales of Taboo" by Karen Finley. The hi-hat is sampled from an aerosol spray. The track's "S express" refrain makes reference to the 42nd Street Shuttle, a line on the New York City Subway. The train sample used is of an InterCity 125. The cover artwork features a cutaway drawing of a British Rail Class 56, a contemporary freight locomotive. For the North American release, some spoken word samples had to be removed due to licensing issues, and were recreated by unnamed voice artists.

== Samples used ==
This is a list of samples used in "Theme from S-Express".

- Paula Prentiss "Yes. Yes. This, it's wonderful." is taken from the 1975 film The Stepford Wives
- Alfredo de la Fé – "Hot to Trot" from Alfredo, 1979 (LP)
- Crystal Grass – "Crystal World" from You're All I Ever Dreamed Of, 1974 (LP)
- Karen Finley – "Tales of Taboo" from Tales of Taboo, 1986 (12")
- Debbie Harry – "Feel the Spin" from Krush Groove soundtrack, 1985 (LP) [removed from U.S. version]
- Vocal sample by Laura Olsher from "The Martian Monsters" from Chilling, Thrilling Sounds of the Haunted House, 1964 (LP) [removed from U.S. version]
- Gil Scott-Heron and Brian Jackson – "The Bottle" from Winter in America, 1974 (LP) [removed from U.S. version]
- Ish Ledesma – "Scream for Daddy" from I Could Love You, 1986 (12")
- Peech Boys – "Don't Make Me Wait" from Life Is Something Special, 1983 (LP)
- Gene Roddenberry – "The Star Trek Dream" from The Star Trek Dream, 1976 (LP) [removed from U.S. version]
- Rose Royce – "Is It Love You're After" from Rose Royce IV: Rainbow Connection, 1979 (LP)
- Sam the Sham & The Pharaohs – "Oh That's Bad, No That's Good" from Oh That's Good, No That's Bad, 1967 (7") [removed from U.S. version]
- Stacey Q – "Two of Hearts" from Better Than Heaven, 1986 (LP) [removed from U.S. version]
- TZ – "I Got the Hots for You" from I Got the Hots for You, 1983 (12")
- Yazoo – "Situation" from Upstairs at Eric's, 1982 (LP)

== Critical reception ==
Ben Thompson from NME wrote, "A mad disco travelogue hosted by a spaced-out Michael Rodd, this is probably in the top five already. The cinematic horny bit from Shaft (I think), lots of train noises. 'Uno Dos Tres Quatros' and they're off. All stations to Dartford via Woolwich Arsenal and Slade Green and No Messing; a synthesiser thump catchy enough to be 'AE IOU' by Freeeze says this one cannot fail. If you were down and out and had only one leg this record wouldn't buy you a cup of tea, but I suppose that's not a factor in this day and age." Nancy Culp from Record Mirror named "Theme from S-Express" Single of the Week, adding, "Coming on all Seventies and Cerrone (who could forget 'Supernature'?) Mark Moore's S'Express follows on in fine Rhythm King tradition (can the label do no wrong, I ask myself?). You see, the reason these DJs are making such great dancefloor records is that they know what gets you in the groove, man! With this one, you can have a giggle while you dance, too! It has just the right amount of tack/trendy quota to make sure it follows 'Beat Dis' straight to the top." The magazine's James Hamilton wrote in his dance column, "London DJ Mark Moore leads the Seventies flares fashion with a Rose Royce/BT Express-type buzzing bass synth and hissing hi-hat drive 117-0bpm semi-instrumental, full of samples, quotes and sound effects in current Eighties style, a likely hit."

== Impact and legacy ==
In 1999, German Spex magazine included "Theme from S-Express" in their "The Best Singles of the Century" list. In 2014, English DJ and music producer Duke Dumont ranked it number three in his list of "The 10 Best UK Number One Singles", saying, "A masterclass in sampling – look at the list for yourself! This was the first Italo house record to chart at number one, and it opened the gates for…" In 2020, The Guardian ranked the song number 51 in their list of "The 100 Greatest UK No 1s", writing, "To watch Top of the Pops as 1987 gives way to 1988 is to watch the freaks taking over the asylum: after MARRS and Bomb the Bass's earlier acid house hits, S-Express's sample-heavy track affirmed the sound's chart coronation, making the Stock Aitken Waterman stable look even more square, and stuck one in the eye of London's throttlingly cool club scene with its euphoric, queer collage." In 2024, Classic Pop ranked "Theme from S-Express" number one in their list of "Top 20 80s House Hits".

== Track listings ==
- CD maxi
1. "Theme from S-Express" – (3:55)
2. "The Trip" (Microdot House mix) – (5:41)
3. "Theme from S-Express" (Herbal Tea Casualty mix) – (8:05)
- 7-inch single
1. "Theme from S-Express" – (3:55)
2. "The Trip" (Microdot House mix) – (4:18)
- 12-inch maxi, Europe 1
1. "Theme from S-Express" – (5:58)
2. "The Trip" (Microdot House mix) – (5:40)
3. "Theme from S-Express" – (3:55)
- 12-inch maxi, Europe 2
1. "Theme from S-Express" (Herbal Tea Casualty mix)
2. "The Trip" (Microdot House mix) – (5:40)
3. "Theme from S'Express" – (3:55)
- 12-inch maxi, Canada and UK
1. "Theme from S-Express" (12-inch U.S.A. mix) – (5:53)
2. "Theme from S-Express" (7-inch U.S.A. mix) – (3:53)
3. "The Trip" (Microdot House mix) – (5:53)
- Cassette
1. "Theme from S-Express" (7-inch U.S.A. mix)
2. "Theme from S-Express" (12-inch U.S.A. mix)
3. "The Trip"
4. "Theme from S-Express" (7-inch U.S.A. mix)
5. "Theme from S-Express" (12-inch U.S.A. mix)
6. "The Trip"
- CD maxi - Theme From S-Express (The Return Trip) (1996 release)
1. "Theme from S-Express" (Tony De Vit 7-inch mix) – (4:04)
2. "Theme from S-Express" (Aquarius 7-inch mix) – (4:12)
3. "Theme from S-Express" (Original Theme 7-inch mix Plus-8) – (3:36)
4. "Theme from S-Express" (Tony De Vit 12-inch mix) – (8:51)
5. "Theme from S-Express" (Aquarius 'Party On The Orient Express' mix) – (7:36)
6. "Theme from S-Express" (Carl Craig's Edited Birthday Surprise mix) – (7:36)

== Charts ==
=== Weekly charts ===
Chart (1988)	Peak position
Australia (ARIA)	11
Austria (Ö3 Austria Top 40)	9
Belgium (Ultratop 50 Flanders)	1
Canada Dance/Urban (RPM)	1
Europe (Eurochart Hot 100)	1
Finland (Suomen virallinen lista)	2
France (SNEP)	2
Greece (IFPI)	1
Ireland (IRMA)	2
Israel (Israeli Singles Chart)	3
Italy (Musica e dischi)	5
Luxembourg (Radio Luxembourg)	1
Netherlands (Dutch Top 40)	2
Netherlands (Single Top 100)	2
New Zealand (Recorded Music NZ)	7
Norway (VG-lista)	2
Sweden (Sverigetopplistan)	9
Switzerland (Schweizer Hitparade)	1
UK Singles (Official Charts)	1
US Billboard Hot 100	91
US 12-inch Singles Sales (Billboard)	4
US Dance Club Play (Billboard)	1
West Germany (GfK)	2

Chart (1996)	Peak position
Europe (Eurochart Hot 100)	54
Netherlands (Single Top 100)	24

=== Year-end charts ===
Chart (1988)	Position
Belgium (Ultratop)	14
Canada Dance/Urban (RPM)	13
Europe (Eurochart Hot 100)	6
Netherlands (Single Top 100)	11
Switzerland (Schweizer Hitparade)	9
UK Singles (OCC)	19
US 12-inch Singles Sales (Billboard)	36
US Dance Club Play (Billboard)	15
West Germany (Media Control)	22

Chart (1996)	Position
UK Club Chart (Music Week)	35

== Certifications ==
Region	Certification	Certified units/sales
France (SNEP)	Gold	500,000^{*}
United Kingdom (BPI)	Silver	250,000^{^}
^{*} Sales figures based on certification alone.^{^} Shipments figures based on certification alone.
