= Superfly Guy =

1988 single by S'Express

Single by S'Express

from the album Original Soundtrack
- B-side: "Funky Killer"
- Released: July 1988
- Recorded: 1988
- Genre: Acid house

S'Express singles chronology
"Theme from S-Express" (1988)	"Superfly Guy" (1988)	"Mantra for a State of Mind" (1989)

Music video
- "Superfly Guy" on YouTube

"Superfly Guy" is a song by British dance music act S'Express, released in July 1988 as the second single from their debut album, Original Soundtrack (1988). The song was a hit on the charts in Europe and reached number five on the UK singles charts in August 1988.

== Critical reception ==
James Hamilton from Record Mirror wrote in his dance column, "Chugging and thumping 117 1/2-0bpm percussive jiggly thudder with chanting girls, wailing guys, dialogue samples and various breaks, quite bright but monotonous and less catchy than their number one."

== Charts ==
Chart (1988)	Peak position
Australia (ARIA)	35
Austria (Ö3 Austria Top 40)	21
Belgium (Ultratop 50 Flanders)	12
Finland (Suomen virallinen lista)	2
France (SNEP)	24
Luxembourg (Radio Luxembourg)	2
Netherlands (Dutch Top 40)	26
Netherlands (Single Top 100)	15
New Zealand (Recorded Music NZ)	12
Norway (VG-lista)	8
Sweden (Sverigetopplistan)	19
Switzerland (Schweizer Hitparade)	11
UK Singles (OCC)	5
US Hot Dance Club Play (Billboard)	2
West Germany (Official German Charts)	13
