= Two Lane Blacktop =

New Zealand hard rock band

- Origin: Wellington, New Zealand
- Genres: Hard rock
- Years active: 2001–2003
- Past members: Matt Harrop; Phil Smiley; Pip Brown; Luke Hutching; Nato Hickey; Ben Fraser

Two Lane Blacktop was a hard rock band from Wellington, New Zealand who formed in 2001 and disbanded in 2003. The band wrote all its songs about movies and was named after a 1971 film directed by Monte Hellman. The members of the band were Matt Harrop on vocals and guitar, Luke Hutching on bass, Phil Smiley on drums, and Pip Brown on lead guitar and background vocals.

The band was influenced by protopunk groups such as The Stooges and The MC5, and were often compared with contemporary hard rock bands such as fellow countrymen The Datsuns.

== History ==
The band formed in early 2001 when Harrop's then hardcore band was looking for a second guitarist. Harrop invited Brown to audition after meeting her in a documentary film class. Harrop and Brown's mutual interest in old cinema and 70s rock inspired them to form a new band and start writing songs. Smiley, a mutual acquaintance of Brown and Harrop, was asked to drum, introducing a darker feel to the sound, and another design school student, Ben Fraser, a trained jazz musician, was called in to play bass. As a member of two other local bands, Fraser didn't have enough time for the increasing workload of Two Lane Blacktop and soon left the band. Nato Hickey, bass player in the band Paselode, temporarily filled in while the band looked for a replacement. Hickey introduced the band to their future manager Dave Benge, then manager of New Zealand bands Fur Patrol and Cassette, before Hutching, lead guitarist for the band Fore Arm of Fury, was brought in on bass about one month before their first scheduled shows in Australia.

The band enjoyed quick success in Australia, riding the wave of the popular New Rock revival, and it wasn't long before the band was making frequent trips between the two countries.

In May 2003, the 7" single "The Rat" / "Hellhound" was released through Infidelity Records and distributed throughout New Zealand and Australia. It gained considerable air play in each country and was placed on rotation by John Peel on his Radio 1 programme. The band was received well by the Australian press, appearing in the 'ones to watch' issue of Rolling Stone magazine in June 2003, as did their single "The Rat", which made it onto the CD which came with that issue. Back in New Zealand, the band gained nominations for 'Best new band' and 'Best unreleased song' in the New Zealand BNet awards.

In mid-2003, the band made its first trip to America, playing 3 weeks of shows in Los Angeles and New York. On the band's return the first tracks of their new album were recorded at the language of love studios in Wellington – these recordings have never been released.

In late 2003, one week before an East Coast Australian tour with American band Modey Lemon, Two Lane Blacktop decided to split up. The reasons for the breakup have not been made clear, but personality conflicts have been rumoured to be the cause of it.

== Group members ==
Core Members

- Matt Harrop – rhythm guitar, vocals
- Pip Brown – lead guitar, background vocals
- Luke Hutching – bass
- Phil Smiley – drums

Previous

- Nato Hickey – bass
- Ben Fraser – bass

== Discography ==
=== Albums ===
- The Girl (2003) (unreleased)

=== EPs ===
- Live (2001)
- Mechanic Demo (2001)
- The Mechanic (2002)

=== Singles ===
- "The Rat/Hellhound" (2002)

== After disbanding ==
Brown now fronts her own solo project called Ladyhawke.

Hutching now plays bass in Wellington rock band The Accelerants.

Smiley now plays drums in Melbourne group The Rise and Demise.
