= Sarah Larnach =

Sarah Larnach is a Grammy-nominated visual artist from New Zealand and Australia. She is best known for her collaborations with musicians, creating single artworks, Grammy and ARIA nominated album covers and packaging, tour art and music video contributions.

== Career ==
Sarah Larnach started her career in 2007 by creating artwork for New Zealand musician and best friend Ladyhawke. For a time, Larnach and Ladyhawke were in a relationship.

In 2008, Larnach worked on the video for "My Delirium" by Ladyhawke, directed by UK duo, Frater. When producing the music video, Frater collaborated with Sarah Larnach, who also drew the album cover for the Ladyhawke album and her singles. Larnach painted nearly all of the background scenes, and the images of Ladyhawke and the car were created using a rotoscope layering technique.

In 2009, Larnach and Ladyhawke collaborated on label design for the Beck's beer "Music Inspired Art" campaign.

Larnach's artwork for the 2013 "Love Your Condom" campaign by New Zealand Aids Foundation stirred up controversy, with a complaint to the New Zealand Advertising Standard Authority that was not upheld.

Larnach attended the 2015 Grammy Awards, for her nomination in the Best Recording Package category with Passenger's album Whispers. Whispers II, also featuring Sarah's artwork, was released in 2015.

Larnach also illustrated the children's book The Adventures of Celia Kaye, and designed the children's book Have You Seen My Tail?

Sarah Larnach has exhibited as an artist in New Zealand, Australia, Spain, the United Kingdom, and the United States. Sarah is an Element Eden Advocate.

She lives in Auckland, New Zealand, returning in 2013 after more than a decade spent abroad.
