= Pascal Gabriel =

Belgian-born producer and musician (born 1956)

- Also known as: Stubbleman
- Born: 15 December 1956 (age 69); Belgium
- Origin: London, England; Provence, France
- Occupations: Songwriter; producer; mixer
- Instruments: Bass Guitar, percussion
- Years active: 1988–present
- Labels: Crammed Discs; Mute
- Website: melophobia.com

Pascal Gabriel (born 15 December 1956) also known as Stubbleman, is a Belgian-born record producer, songwriter and musician based in London, England and Provence, France.

As a songwriter he has co-written for such artists as Dido, Kylie Minogue, and Will Young.

== Music career: Background ==
Pascal Gabriel's musical career began in 1977 in the punk rock band The Razors on bass guitar.

He left Belgium for London in 1979. During the early 1980s, he had spells in various experimental groups, including art-school band Church of Friendly Valley with scratch video artist George Barber, and an electronic project whose only performance was in a supermarket.

He formed a duo with guitarist Danny Kustow, as well as touring as a percussionist with the Tom Robinson Band, before starting to pick up work as a freelance sound engineer in various London studios, earning a reputation for innovative remixes for artists such as Marc Almond (Soft Cell) and Yello. In 1983 he had his first release, with two experimental tracks on the Touch cassette T2 Meridians One, alongside future collaborator Simon Fisher Turner, before beginning to concentrate on studio work.

== Producing and writing ==
Toward the end of the 1980s, Gabriel was producer and co-writer for S'Express, with House DJ Mark Moore, and Bomb the Bass, with Hip-Hop DJ Tim Simenon — two of the first sample-heavy dancefloor artists of that era. He claimed a number one UK single with the S'Express track "Theme from S'Express" and a number two with Bomb the Bass' "Beat Dis."

Following the success of S'Express and Bomb the Bass, Gabriel embarked on a series of projects, mixing, producing and writing with a variety of artists, including Claudia Brücken (formerly of Propaganda), Wire, and Debbie Harry from Blondie.

In the 1990s, he moved into indie and pop music, collaborating with EMF, Inspiral Carpets, Kitchens of Distinction, Billy Mackenzie and Siouxsie Sioux's second group The Creatures.

From 1996 to 1998 he wrote, produced and performed with the Mute Records-signed band Peach (known as "Peach Union" in the U.S.). Their song "On My Own" was featured prominently in the film Sliding Doors.

Gabriel subsequently wrote and produced with a host of popular artists, including the then unsigned singer Dido (with whom he wrote several songs: "I'm No Angel" and "Here with Me" from her multi-million selling debut album No Angel), Kylie Minogue (including "Your Love" for her album Fever), Dot Allison, Natalie Imbruglia, Rachel Stevens, Sophie Ellis-Bextor, Skye Edwards (Morcheeba), Bebel Gilberto and many others.

He collaborated extensively with Miss Kittin, co-writing and producing her solo album BatBox, and with New Zealand star Ladyhawke, penning and producing five tracks on her debut album, Ladyhawke (including the singles "My Delirium", "Dusk Till Dawn", and "Magic") and the whole of her second album Anxiety, which he also mixed, in 2012.

Around the same time he co-wrote "Tune Into My Heart" on Little Boots' début album Hands, carried out additional production on Goldfrapp's fifth album, Head First, and co-wrote and produced three tracks on Marina and the Diamonds 2010 album The Family Jewels, and the song "Can't Beat the Feeling" on Kylie Minogue's 2010 UK number one Aphrodite album.

He co-wrote several tracks with Will Young for his 2011 UK number one album Echoes, including the single "Losing Myself", recorded in his studios in London and France, and co-wrote the single "The Apple" with VV Brown.

After writing several tracks with The Temper Trap for their Thick as Thieves album in 2015, he produced Australian songstress Emma Louise's 2016 album Supercry.

== Solo career as Stubbleman ==
In 2018, Gabriel developed a solo project, 'Stubbleman'. A return to his electronic and ambient roots, it combines a cinematic mixture of found sounds and field recordings with modular synthesizers and live piano. Stubbleman's debut album, Mountains and Plains, inspired by a road trip across the US, was released on Marc Hollander's cult Belgian indie label Crammed Discs in April 2019, to positive reviews in the UK, and internationally.

His live shows in November at the From the Source festival at Warwick Arts Centre and the Purcell Room in London's SouthBank Centre, as part of the EFJ London Jazz Festival, involved extensive use of self-made automatons: glockenspiels, vibraphones and xylophones. On 5 June 2020, he released an EP, The Blackbird Tapes, on Crammed Discs, inspired by birdsong during the Coronavirus lockdown in London during spring 2020.

== Selected production credits ==
- S'Express - Co-wrote and produced no.1 single "Theme from S'Express".
- Dido - Co-wrote "Here With Me" and "I'm no Angel" from 1999's No Angel.
- Kylie Minogue - Co-wrote "Your Love" and "Tightrope" from 2001's Fever.
- Bebel Gilberto - Co-wrote and produced Ceu Distante from 2004's Bebel Gilberto album.
- Rachel Stevens - Co-wrote So Good and "I Will Be There" from 2005's Come And Get It.
- Freeform Five - Co-wrote "No More Conversations" (2005).
- Miss Kittin - Co-wrote and co-produced Miss Kittin's BatBox album (2008), including the single "Kittin Is High" and "Grace".
- Dot Allison - Co-wrote "Cry" from her 2009 album Room 7½.
- Marina and the Diamonds - co-wrote and produced "Shampain", "Girls", "Rootless", and the unreleased track "Sinful" from her 2010 album The Family Jewels.
- Goldfrapp - Additional Production on "Rocket", "Believer", "Dreaming", "Head First" and "I Wanna Life" from their 2010 album Head First.
- Kylie Minogue - Co-wrote and co-produced "Can't Beat the Feeling" from her 2010 album Aphrodite
- Will Young - Co-wrote "Losing Myself" and "Happy Now" from his 2011 album Echoes.
- Ladyhawke - Co-wrote and produced several songs for 2008's Ladyhawke, including the singles "Dusk Till Dawn", "My Delirium" and "Magic". Also co-wrote, produced and mixed all songs for her 2012 album Anxiety.
- Little Boots - Co-wrote "Tune into my Heart" from her album Hands (2009).
- V V Brown - Co-wrote and produced "The Apple" from her 2013 album Samson & Delilah.
- The Temper Trap - Co-wrote singles "Thick as Thieves" and "Alive" as well as three other songs from their album Thick as Thieves (2016).
- Emma Louise - Produced her album Supercry (2016).
- Stubbleman - Composed, performed and produced the album Mountains and Plains (2019).
- Stubbleman - Composed, performed and produced the EP The Blackbird Tapes (2020).
- Stubbleman - Composed, performed and produced the album 1:46:43 - The Ventoux Trilogy (2025).
