= Ladyhawke (musician) =

New Zealand singer-songwriter (born 1979)

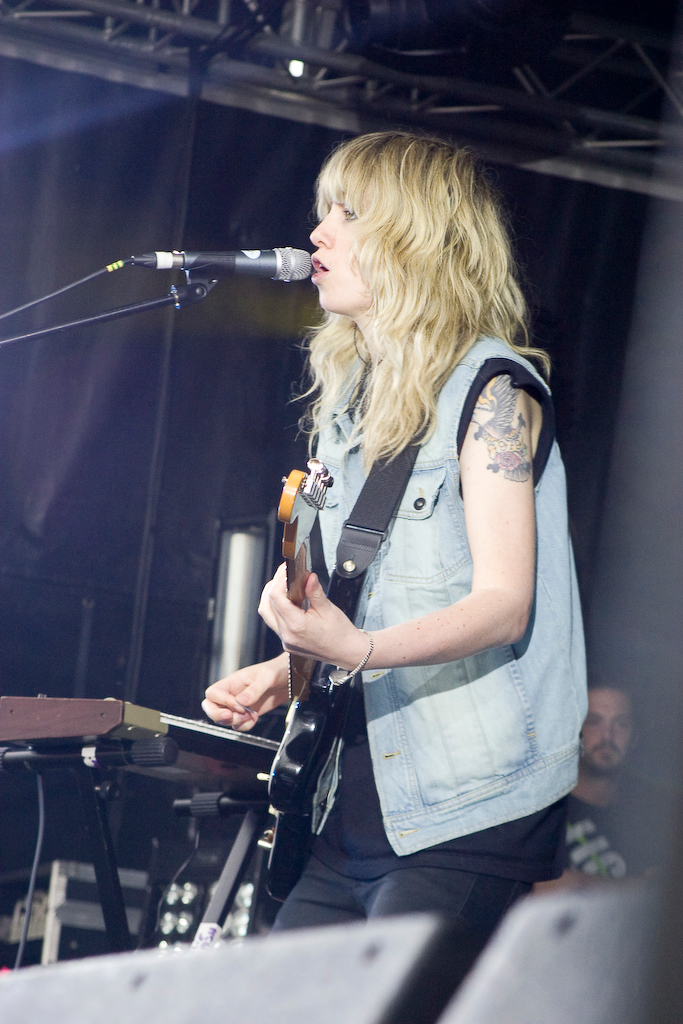
- Ladyhawke performing at the Evolution Festival in Newcastle upon Tyne, England, on 25 May 2009

Background information
- Also known as: Pip Brown
- Born: Phillipa Margaret Brown; 13 July 1979 (age 47); Masterton, New Zealand
- Genres: New wave; indie rock; synth-pop
- Occupations: Singer-songwriter; multi-instrumentalist
- Instruments: Vocals; bass guitar; guitar; drums; keyboards; synthesiser
- Years active: 2001–present
- Labels: Modular; Island; Polyvinyl; BMG
- Formerly of: Two Lane Blacktop; Teenager; Pnau
- Spouse: Madeleine Sami (m. 2015–2023)
- Website: www.ladyhawkemusic.com

Phillipa Margaret "Pip" Brown (born 13 July 1979), better known by her stage name Ladyhawke, is a New Zealand singer-songwriter and multi-instrumentalist. She took her stage name from Richard Donner's 1985 film Ladyhawke.

Brown was part of the Wellington-based band Two Lane Blacktop (2001–2003), before moving to Australia where, in 2004, she formed the art rock band Teenager with Nick Littlemore of Pnau. In 2007 she moved to London, around 2013 to Los Angeles, and then subsequently relocating back to her native New Zealand after the release of her third album, Wild Things.

Brown's debut solo album, Ladyhawke, was released on 22 September 2008 through Modular Recordings, and topped the RIANZ Albums Chart. It spawned five singles of which "My Delirium" was the most successful. At the ARIA Music Awards of 2009, Ladyhawke won Breakthrough Artist in both album and single categories.

Brown's second solo album, Anxiety, was released in May 2012, her third solo album, Wild Things, in June 2016 and her fourth album, Time Flies, in November 2021.

== Early life ==
Phillipa Margaret Brown was born on 13 July 1979 in Masterton, a town in the Wairarapa region of New Zealand. She came from a musical family, with her mother being a singer/guitarist and her stepfather a jazz drummer. During her childhood, various illnesses and allergies kept her in and out of the hospital. At age ten she contracted erysipeloid, a disease that is common in seagulls and sharks but had not been seen in humans in New Zealand for twenty years. Her allergies to antibiotics and antihistamines greatly complicated treatment efforts and almost put her into a coma, and she came close to dying.

As an adult, Brown was diagnosed with Asperger syndrome. She believes that the large amount of her childhood she spent absorbed in music, be it listening to the radio or to her mother's Beatles and Pretenders albums, was attributable to this syndrome.

While attending Chanel College, she played in several grunge bands. After high school, Brown moved from Masterton to Wellington.

== Recording career ==
=== Two Lane Blacktop (2001–2003) ===
In 2001 in Wellington, Brown formed the band Two Lane Blacktop with some friends, playing lead guitar. She described the group as being "like Iggy and The Stooges meets The Clash". She cites her experience playing the notorious New York City club CBGB with Two Lane Blacktop as being a defining moment. In 2003 Two Lane Blacktop disbanded when their lead singer, Matt Harrop, and drummer, Phil Smiley, both quit the band two days prior to a scheduled tour of Australia with Modey Lemon, after which they were due to play at SXSW in Austin, Texas. Brown then made the impulsive decision to take her flight to Australia anyway, and she relocated to Melbourne.

=== Teenager (2003–2006) ===
Some time after Brown's move to Melbourne, Sydney-based musician Nick Littlemore of Pnau (he later formed Empire of the Sun) heard of her relocation and asked her if she was interested in joining an art rock band he had started called Teenager. Brown liked Littlemore's music and, in 2004, decided to join. Brown and Littlemore played together for two years, with Brown relocating to Sydney to be closer to the band, as well as other people she enjoyed playing and writing music with.

Teenager issued their debut album, Thirteen, as well as the related singles "Pony" and "Bound and Gagged", in 2006. Mess + Noise's Craig Mathieson described the album as "a pop record, albeit a particularly exotic species that equally suggests creative guile and hints of self-indulgence ... 'Pony' is the closest the album comes to cheap genre holidaying, approximating rock attitude when the organic and desperate growth of 'Bound And Gagged' is so much more impressive". Brown and Littlemore co-wrote "Alone Again" and "West" for Teenager. Soon after the album's appearance Brown left to concentrate on her career as Ladyhawke, she later credited Littlemore:

I was quite happy playing guitar [in Teenager], contributing my ideas and stepping back [...] [Littlemore] heard me singing a song, and rushed in and said, "What's that?" I was like, "It's just like, you know..." [...] I had a Myspace page, calling myself Ladyhawke with a couple of rough demos up there. Nick was like, "That's cool, you should really follow that up. You just need to get in a studio and record it". So we jumped in the car, and he drove me out to his parents' house, and we recorded that song ... that was the start for me, where he helped me get the confidence.

=== Solo career (2006–present) ===
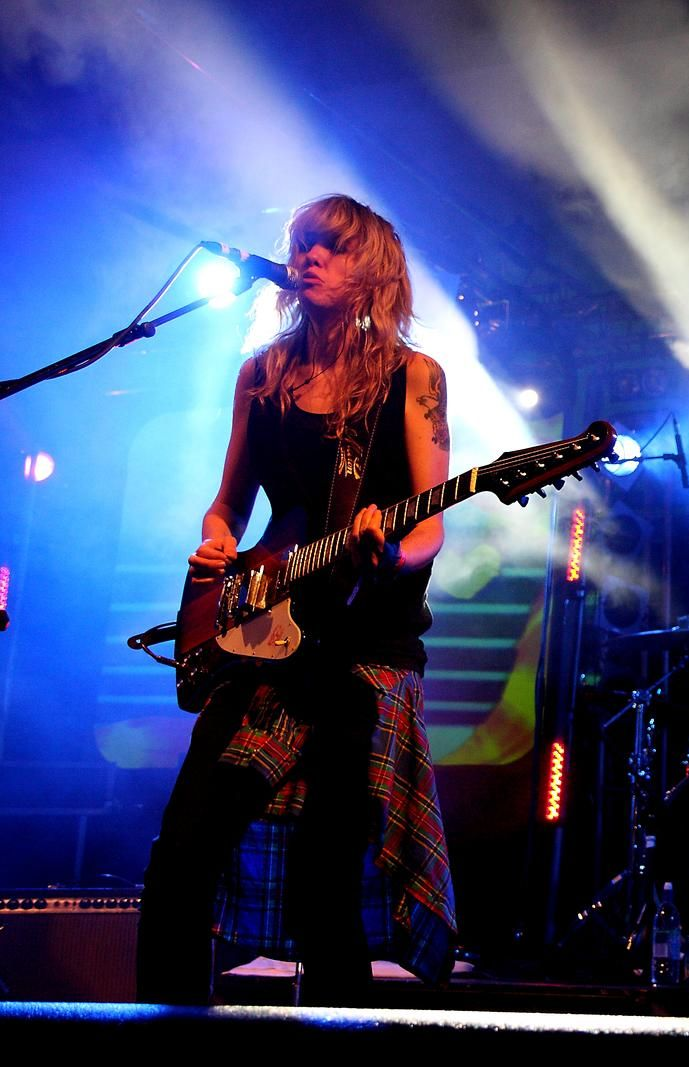
Ladyhawke performing at the Rhythm & Vines festival 2008/2009

==== Ladyhawke (2007–2009) ====
Still close with Littlemore, Brown decided to leave Teenager to focus on a personal project she had been developing for some time, a persona she had dubbed Ladyhawke. She named herself so after a character played by Michelle Pfeiffer in the 1985 film of the same name because she sees herself as "a sort of pop superwoman creating radio-friendly songs with a single bound". Brown says she started Ladyhawke out of a desire to do her own project where she could completely express herself in any way she wanted. She says: "I wanted to make music that could put a smile on people's faces and give them a feeling of nostalgia even though they may be hearing my songs for the first time. I love how music evokes memories of a certain time, I wanted to see if I could find a method of songwriting that would evoke those feelings from me on writing the song and then on the individual when listening to it for the first time."

Ladyhawke's debut album, Ladyhawke, was released on 22 September 2008 by Modular Recordings. The album topped the albums chart in New Zealand one year after its release, in October 2009, and was certified platinum by the Recording Industry Association of New Zealand for sales in excess of 15,000 copies. In both Australia and the United Kingdom, it reached number sixteen, and was certified gold. Its biggest hit single was "My Delirium", which charted inside the top ten in both New Zealand and Australia.

Ladyhawke appeared for the first time in a Triple J Hottest 100 with two entries in the 2008 countdown; "My Delirium" at number eleven and "Paris Is Burning" at number twenty-six. Pnau's song "Embrace", which features Ladyhawke, was voted in at number twelve. Brown was nominated for an NME Award for Best Solo Artist.

A limited 7-inch version of "Back of the Van"—each one hand painted by Sarah Larnach—was sold on eBay. All proceeds were given to the Parkinsons Society of New Zealand.

In August 2009 it was announced that she would co-headline a North American tour with Ida Maria, starting 10 September in Atlanta and concluding 3 October in Los Angeles. The tour was sponsored by celebrity blogger Perez Hilton.

==== Anxiety (2011–2014) ====
In April 2011, Ladyhawke stated that she was preparing to release new material in the following months. Her second album was initially scheduled for an October 2011 release, but in September, a spokesperson stated that it was not due to be released until 2012. It was later announced that the album was due for release in March 2012, and that it would be titled Anxiety. Anxiety's release date was later pushed back to May 2012.

In an interview with Digital Spy, Ladyhawke said "I've made an album I'm really proud of, so I just can't wait to start playing with the band again, and touring and having some fun. I can't wait to get back into it."

"Black White & Blue" was released as Anxiety's lead single on 24 January 2012, the song was featured in the soundtracks of the video games Forza Horizon, FIFA 13, and Sleeping Dogs. The single "Sunday Drive" followed in April, and the album itself was released in late May. In July 2012, a third single, "Blue Eyes", was released.

In February 2014, her song "Blue Eyes" was used in a series of Verizon commercials in the United States.

==== Wild Things (2013–2016) ====
On 28 March 2013 Ladyhawke announced she would return to the studio to record her third solo album. By the middle of 2015, the album was finished. In the first half of 2016, it was announced that the record was titled Wild Things. In anticipation, two songs, "A Love Song" and "Sweet Fascination", were made available. The album was released on 3 June 2016. Her song "Let It Roll" was used in an advertisement for Australian telecommunications company Optus. "The River" and "A Love Song" are featured in the soundtrack of the 2016 racing video game Forza Horizon 3.

==== Time Flies (2020–present) ====
On 24 September 2020, Ladyhawke announced that she was in the studio mixing a new record that would be available soon. In March 2021, she revealed that she had signed a new label and publishing deal with BMG. The first single from the album, "Guilty Love", which is a collaboration with Broods vocalist Georgia Nott, was released on 5 March 2021. On 27 May 2021, the album title Time Flies was revealed, and the video for the second single, "Mixed Emotions", debuted. The album was set for release on 8 October 2021, but the release date was moved to 19 November 2021. Ladyhawke stated how she was "....lucky and privileged to be alive and in a room making music" after being diagnosed with Clark's level-four melanoma soon after the birth of her daughter. "There were a couple of weeks where they couldn't tell me if I was going to live....that it had not spread was something of a miracle. The level of it was so bad that it sort of should have gone everywhere." Ladyhawke was cleared by her specialist after undergoing treatment and recovered. She started the recording process for Time Flies during the COVID-19 pandemic, with sessions taking place during video calls with producers Tommy English and Josh Fountain. Ladyhawke mentioned future plans with PNAU in 2023 while touring Australia.

== Collaborations ==
Ladyhawke collaborated with Pnau on "Embrace" from the duo's 2007 self-titled album.

The Charlatans' Tim Burgess said in September 2010 that he is collaborating with Ladyhawke and members of The Horrors and Klaxons on his second solo album. "I've been working with Josh [Hayward], the guitarist from The Horrors and Stefan [Halperin], the drummer from the Klaxons and right now we can only do stuff when our other bands aren't doing things. But when we do get together, it's really explosive and it'll be well worth waiting for. I've also got Ladyhawke singing on it." In December 2011, Burgess revealed that he had collaborated with Ladyhawke on a song entitled "Just One Kiss", which was eventually released on his 2018 album As I Was Now.

In 2011, Ladyhawke collaborated with New Zealand singer Nik Brinkman, better known as Junica, on the single "Living in My House". Also in 2011, she remixed the song "Sister Wife" by American singer Alex Winston.

In 2014, Ladyhawke appeared on the Tiësto album A Town Called Paradise with a track called "Last Train"; Firebeatz also appeared on the track.

In 2019, Ladyhawke was featured on the single "Never Dance Alone", from Australian alternative dance group Crooked Colours' album Langata.

In December 2020, Ladyhawke released "River", her second collaboration with Pnau. Pnau vocalist Nick Littlemore spoke of their experience working together again, stating "It seems every time we’ve collaborated with her it’s been incendiary. We met a long while ago; within moments of meeting it was clear we had a deep connection."

In 2021, Ladyhawke collaborated with Broods on the song "Guilty Love", which appears on Ladyhawke's fourth album, Time Flies.

In August 2024, Ladyhawke on stage in Sydney playing her self titled debut in full confirmed she had been working with Nick Littlemore on their 2007 project Teenager with new music to be released. Several crowd members had been yelling the song titles from the project such as "Alone Again" which the singer responded to an audience member by confirming the project.

== Influences and comparisons ==
Ladyhawke is noted as being influenced by 1980s music. She has been linked to a wave of 1980s-influenced, individualistic, androgynous female musicians in their twenties who emerged in the late 2000s.

Brown also draws inspiration from music of the '90s, including Nirvana. "Listening to Nirvana takes me back to being fourteen at the school disco. Bands from the nineties have that effect on me."

Peaches, to whom Ladyhawke's music has been compared, remixed the single "Paris Is Burning", and the two have performed together, with Peaches taking DJ duties. Ladyhawke's music has also been likened to that of Cyndi Lauper, Pat Benatar, Kim Wilde, Annie and New Young Pony Club.

Brown has stated that her five favourite albums of all time are Hunky Dory (1971) by David Bowie, Time (1981) by ELO and three Fleetwood Mac albums: Fleetwood Mac (it is unclear whether she was referring to the 1968 album or the 1975 album), Rumours (1977), and Tango in the Night (1987).

She has also described video game music as an influence, particularly retro Japanese chiptune music from the 8-bit and 16-bit eras.

== Other pursuits ==
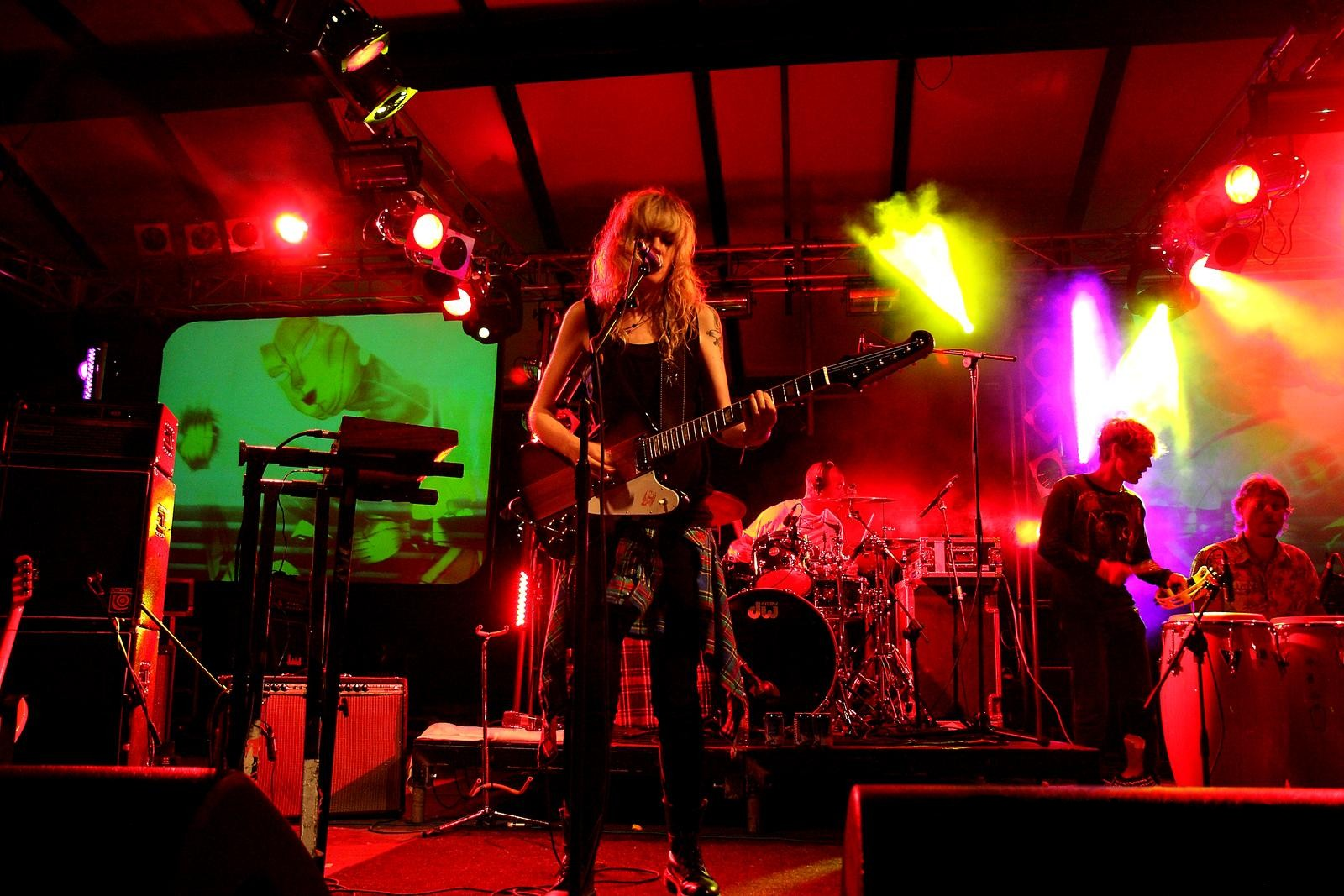
Ladyhawke playing live at the Rhythm & Vines festival 2008/2009

Ladyhawke appeared as herself in the third episode of the British ITV2 sitcom FM, originally aired 11 March 2009. Also in 2009, she designed Music Inspired Art labels for limited edition bottles of Beck's. Labels were illustrated by Sydney-based artist Sarah Larnach, who lived with Ladyhawke back when she was first getting started on her music career.

In 2016, Ladyhawke was featured as part of the group going on a road trip in Air New Zealand's safety video, Summer of Safety.

In 2021, Ladyhawke released a limited-edition video game cartridge keychain in conjunction with the release of her fourth album, Time Flies. The game takes Ladyhawke on a journey to complete her album while encountering characters from the "Time Flies Universe", with digitized versions of the album tracks providing the soundtrack.

== Personal life ==
Brown is a lesbian. On 9 January 2015, she married New Zealand actress, comedian, and filmmaker Madeleine Sami. She moved from London to Los Angeles in 2013. On 20 June 2017 she announced her pregnancy. After a police shooting occurred near their apartment, she returned to Auckland, NZ in 2017. Her first child, a daughter, was born later that year. Sami and Brown announced the end of the relationship in 2023.

Brown is a fan of video games, describing herself as "a big, big gamer".

Brown has a contralto vocal range.

== Discography ==
- Ladyhawke (2008)
- Anxiety (2012)
- Wild Things (2016)
- Time Flies (2021)

== Awards ==
New Zealand Music Awards

Year	Nominated work	Award	Result
2009	Ladyhawke	Album of the Year	Won
2009	Ladyhawke	Best Dance/Electronica Album	Won
2009	"My Delirium"	Single of the Year	Won
2009	Herself	Best Female Solo Artist	Won
2009	Herself	Breakthrough Artist of the Year	Won
2009	Herself	International Achievement Award	Won
2009	Herself	People's Choice Award	Nominated
2012
2012	Herself	Best Female Solo Artist	Nominated
2012	Anxiety	Best Alternative Album	Nominated

APRA Awards

The APRA Awards are held in Australia and New Zealand by the Australasian Performing Right Association to recognise songwriting skills, sales and airplay performance by its members annually.

Year	Nominee / work	Award	Result	Ref.
2022	"River" (with PNAU)	Most Performed Dance/Electronic Work	Nominated	

ARIA Music Awards

Year	Nominated work	Award	Result
2009	Ladyhawke	Breakthrough Artist – Album	Won
2009	Ladyhawke	Best Pop Release	Nominated
2009	Ladyhawke	Best Cover Art	Nominated
2009	"My Delirium"	Single of the Year	Nominated
2009	"My Delirium"	Breakthrough Artist – Single	Won
2009	Herself	Best Female Artist	Nominated

Brit Awards

Year	Nominated work	Award	Result
2010	Herself	International Female Solo Artist	Nominated

NME Awards

Year	Nominated work	Award	Result
2009	Herself	Best Solo Artist	Nominated

MTV Australia Awards

Year	Nominated work	Award	Result
2009	Herself	Best Kiwi	Nominated
2009	Herself	Independent Spirit	Nominated

MTV Europe Music Awards

Year	Nominated work	Award	Result
2016	Herself	Best New Zealand Act	Nominated
