= Rose Royce discography =

The following is the discography of the American soul and R&B band Rose Royce:

== Albums ==
=== Studio albums ===
Year	Title	Peak chart positions							Certifications	Record label
Year	Title	US	US R&B	AUS	CAN	NLD	NZ	UK	Certifications	Record label
1976	Car Wash	14	2	40	1	—	14	59	RIAA: Gold	MCA
1977	In Full Bloom	9	1	—	16	—	—	18	RIAA: Platinum; BPI: Gold	Whitfield
1978	Strikes Again	28	4	44	49	40	19	7	RIAA: Gold; BPI: Gold	Whitfield
1979	Rainbow Connection IV	74	22	—	—	—	—	72		Whitfield
1980	Golden Touch	160	30	—	—	—	—	—		Whitfield
1981	Jump Street	—	—	—	—	12	—	—		Whitfield
1982	Stronger Than Ever	—	50	—	—	22	—	—		Epic
1984	Music Magic	—	—	—	—	—	—	69		Streetwave
1985	The Show Must Go On	—	—	—	—	—	—	—		Streetwave
1986	Fresh Cut	—	50	—	—	—	—	—		Omni
1989	Perfect Lover	—	—	—	—	—	—	—		Omni
"—" denotes a recording that did not chart or was not released in that territory.

=== Live albums ===
- Greatest Hits Live in Concert (1993, Tring Int'l PLC)
- Live in Hollywood (2003, FYD)

=== Compilation albums ===
Year	Title	Peak chart positions		Certifications	Record label
Year	Title	US	UK	Certifications	Record label
1980	Greatest Hits	—	1	BPI: Platinum	Whitfield
1987	The Best of Rose Royce	—	—		Omni
1993	Wishing on a Star	—	—		Warner Bros.
2001	The Very Best of Rose Royce	—	—		Rhino
2002	The Collection	—	—		Spectrum Music
2012	Wishing on a Star: The Love Songs	—	—		Rhino
2022	The Definitive Collection	—	—		Robinsongs
"—" denotes a recording that did not chart or was not released in that territory.

== Singles ==
Year	Title	Peak chart Positions										Certifications	Album
Year	Title	US	US R&B	US Dan	AUS	BEL	CAN	IRE	NLD	NZ	UK	Certifications	Album
1976	"Car Wash"	1	1	3	12	9	1	20	5	5	9	RIAA: Platinum; BPI: Silver; MC: Gold; RMNZ: Gold	Car Wash
1977	"Put Your Money Where Your Mouth Is"	—	—	—	—	—	—	—	—	22	44		Car Wash
1977	"I Wanna Get Next to You"	10	3	—	53	27	14	—	—	6	14		Car Wash
1977	"I'm Going Down"	70	10	—	—	—	58	—	—	—	—		Car Wash
1977	"Do Your Dance (Part 1)"	39	4	20	—	—	66	—	—	—	30		In Full Bloom
1977	"It Makes You Feel Like Dancin'"	—	—	20	—	—	—	—	—	—	16		In Full Bloom
1977	"Ooh Boy"	72	3	—	—	—	35	—	—	—	46		In Full Bloom
1978	"Wishing on a Star"	—	52	—	—	22	—	—	15	—	3	BPI: Silver	In Full Bloom
1978	"I'm in Love (And I Love the Feeling)"	—	5	—	—	—	—	—	—	—	51		Strikes Again
1978	"Love Don't Live Here Anymore"	32	5	—	10	18	41	7	11	2	2	BPI: Gold	Strikes Again
1979	"First Come, First Serve"	—	65	—	—	—	—	—	—	34	—		Strikes Again
1979	"Is It Love You're After"	—	31	—	—	23	—	17	42	—	13		Rainbow Connection IV
1979	"What You Waitin' For"	—	—	—	—	—	—	—	—	—	—		Rainbow Connection IV
1980	"Pop Your Fingers"	—	60	—	—	—	—	—	—	—	—		Greatest Hits
1980	"You're a Winner"	—	—	—	—	—	—	—	—	—	—		Golden Touch
1980	"Funkin' Around"	—	—	—	—	—	—	—	—	—	—		Golden Touch
1981	"Golden Touch"	—	56	—	—	—	—	—	—	—	—		Golden Touch
1981	"I Wanna Make It with You"	—	—	—	—	—	—	—	—	—	—		Golden Touch
1981	"R.R. Express"	—	—	8	—	6	—	—	2	—	52		Jump Street
1982	"Best Love"	—	64	—	—	12	—	—	19	—	—		Stronger Than Ever
1982	"Still in Love"	—	—	—	—	—	—	—	—	—	—		Stronger Than Ever
1982	"You Blew It"	—	—	—	—	—	—	—	—	—	—		Stronger Than Ever
1984	"Magic Touch"	—	77	—	—	—	—	—	—	—	56		Music Magic
1984	"Holding on to Love"	—	—	—	—	—	—	—	—	—	—		Music Magic
1985	"Love Me Right Now"	—	—	—	—	—	—	—	49	—	60		The Show Must Go On
1985	"I'm Ready for Your Love"	—	—	—	—	—	—	—	—	—	—		The Show Must Go On
1986	"Doesn't Have to Be This Way"	—	22	—	—	—	—	—	—	—	—		Fresh Cut
1987	"Lonely Road"	—	45	—	—	—	—	—	—	—	—		Fresh Cut
1987	"If Walls Could Talk"	—	69	—	—	—	—	—	—	—	—		Fresh Cut
1988	"Car Wash" / "Is It Love You're After" (re-release)	—	—	—	—	—	—	—	—	—	20		—N/a
1989	"Perfect Lover"	—	—	—	—	—	—	—	—	—	—		Perfect Lover
1998	"Car Wash 1998" (featuring Gwen Dickey)	—	—	—	—	—	—	—	—	—	18		—N/a
"—" denotes a recording that did not chart or was not released in that territory.
