= Greatest Hits (Rose Royce album) =

Compilation album by Rose Royce
- Released: 1980
- Genre: Funk, soul, disco
- Length: 55:39
- Label: Whitfield
- Producer: Norman Whitfield

Rose Royce chronology
Rainbow Connection IV (1979)	Greatest Hits (1980)	Golden Touch (1981)

Greatest Hits
- European version cover

Professional ratings
Review scores
Source	Rating
AllMusic	4/5 stars

Greatest Hits is a compilation album released by funk band Rose Royce on the Whitfield label in 1980. All tracks were produced by Norman Whitfield.

== History ==
The album reached number one on the UK Albums Chart. Two original songs were released as singles, "Pop Your Fingers" and "You're a Winner". "Pop Your Fingers" peaked at No. 60 on the Billboard R&B Singles chart, while "You're a Winner" failed to chart.

== Track listing ==
=== North American version ===
Side one: Dancing Side
No.	Title	Writer(s)	Length
1.	"Pop Your Fingers"	Norman Whitfield	4:30
2.	"It Makes You Feel Like Dancin'"	Norman Whitfield	4:27
3.	"First Come, First Serve"	Norman Whitfield	3:21
4.	"Car Wash"	Norman Whitfield	3:18
5.	"Is It Love You're After"	Miles Gregory	3:48
6.	"Do Your Dance"	Norman Whitfield, Dwight Turner	5:21
7.	"You're a Winner"	Norman Whitfield, Marvin Smith	4:24

Side two: Romancing Side
No.	Title	Writer(s)	Length
8.	"Ooh Boy"	Norman Whitfield	3:48
9.	"I Wanna Get Next to You"	Norman Whitfield	3:55
10.	"Wishing on a Star"	Billie Calvin	3:57
11.	"I'm in Love (And I Love the Feeling)"	Norman Whitfield	3:41
12.	"I'm Going Down"	Norman Whitfield	3:35
13.	"I Wonder Where You Are Tonight"	Robert Daniels	3:38
14.	"Love Don't Live Here Anymore"	Miles Gregory	3:56

=== European version ===
Side one: Romancing Side
No.	Title	Writer(s)	Length
1.	"Love Don't Live Here Anymore"	Miles Gregory	3:56
2.	"Wishing on a Star"	Billie Calvin	4:50
3.	"I Wanna Get Next to You"	Norman Whitfield	3:57
4.	"Angel in the Sky"	Billie Calvin	4:56
5.	"I'm in Love (And I Love the Feeling)"	Norman Whitfield	3:41
6.	"I Wonder Where You Are Tonight"	Robert Daniels	3:37
7.	"You're on My Mind"	Norman Whitfield, Lequeint Jobe, Henry Garner	3:27

Side two: Dancing Side
No.	Title	Writer(s)	Length
8.	"Is It Love You're After"	Miles Gregory	5:07
9.	"Car Wash"	Norman Whitfield	3:16
10.	"It Makes You Feel Like Dancin'"	Norman Whitfield	4:34
11.	"Do Your Dance"	Norman Whitfield, Dwight Turner	3:28
12.	"First Come, First Serve"	Norman Whitfield	3:19
13.	"Put Your Money Where Your Mouth Is"	Norman Whitfield	3:25
14.	"Ooh Boy"	Norman Whitfield	3:48

== Charts ==
Chart (1980)	Peaks
US Billboard Top LPs	204
UK Albums Chart	1

Singles

Year	Single	Peaks
Year	Single	US R&B
1980	"Pop Your Fingers"	60
1980	"You're a Winner"	—
