= Show Me =

Show Me may refer to:

== Music ==
=== Albums ===
- Show Me (54-40 album), a 1987 album by 54-40, or the title song
- Show Me (The Cover Girls album)
- Show Me, a 1966 album by Joe Tex

=== Songs ===
- "Show Me" (Jessica Sutta song)
- "Show Me" (John Legend song)
- "Show Me" (Joe Tex song)
- "Show Me" (Kid Ink song)
- "Show Me" (Moya Brennan song)
- "Show Me" (Pretenders song)
- "Show Me" (The Cover Girls song)
- "Show Me", a song by ABC from The Lexicon of Love
- "Show Me", a song by Ayra Starr and Latto from Official FIFA World Cup 2026 Album, 2026
- "Show Me", a song by Big Time Rush from Elevate, 2011
- "Show Me", a song by Bruno Mars from Unorthodox Jukebox
- "Show Me", a song by Dexys Midnight Runners
- "Show Me", a song by Dislocation Dance from Midnight Shift, 1984
- "Show Me", a song by Gabrielle from Under My Skin
- "Show Me", a song by Janet Jackson from 20 Y.O.
- "Show Me", a song by Joey Badass from 2000
- "Show Me", a song by Michael Lington
- "Show Me", a song by Mint Royale from Dancehall Places
- "Show Me", a song by Over the Rhine from Ohio
- "Show Me", a song by Sandie Shaw
- "Show Me", a song by Tiësto and DallasK, 2015
- "Show Me", a song by Ultra Naté from One Woman's Insanity
- "Show Me", a song by Usher from Looking 4 Myself, 2012
- "Show Me", a song by Yes from The Ultimate Yes: 35th Anniversary Collection
- "Show Me", a song from the 1956 stage musical My Fair Lady

== Other uses ==
- Show Me!, a 1975 English version of the 1974 German sex-education book Zeig Mal!
- Show Me (film), a 2004 Canadian film
- Show Me (TV series), a 1987 British TV game show hosted by Joe Brown
- "Show Me", the unofficial motto of the U.S. state of Missouri

== See also ==
- Show Me Show Me, a UK children's TV show
- Show Me the Money (disambiguation)
