= Because of You (The Cover Girls song) =

Single by The Cover Girls

from the album Show Me
- Released: September 29, 1987
- Recorded: 1986
- Genre: Freestyle
- Length: 5:38
- Label: Fever Records
- Songwriter: David Cole

The Cover Girls singles chronology
| "Spring Love" (1987) | "Because of You" (1987) | "Promise Me" (1988) |

"Because of You" is a song by the American freestyle girl group the Cover Girls. Released as a 12" single and 7" single on September 29, 1987, "Because of You" reached No. 27 on the Billboard Hot 100 chart in February 1988.

== Charts ==
| Chart (1987) | Peak position |
|---|---|
| US Billboard Hot 100 | 27 |
| US Hot Dance/Disco (Billboard) | 14 |
| US Top R&B/Hip-Hop Singles (Billboard) | 47 |
