= Show Me (The Cover Girls album) =

Studio album by The Cover Girls
- Released: November 30, 1986
- Recorded: D&D Recording Studio, Soundtrack Studio, Quad Recording Studio, Shakedown Sound Studio, Electric Lady Studio, Marathon Recording Studio, & Hip Pocket Recording Studio, New York, New York
- Genre: Dance, R&B, freestyle
- Length: 39:32
- Label: Fever Records
- Producer: Andy "Panda" Tripoli "Little" Louie Vega; Robert Clivillés & David Cole; Albert Cabrera & Tony Moran (The Latin Rascals)

The Cover Girls chronology
Show Me (1986)	We Can't Go Wrong (1989)

Singles from Show Me
- 1. "Show Me" Released: October 28, 1986; 2. "Because of You" Released: September 29, 1987

Professional ratings
Review scores
Source	Rating
AllMusic	4/5 stars
Robert Christgau	B

Show Me is the debut album by the R&B–dance trio the Cover Girls released on independent label Fever Records. The album would produce the hit title track, "Show Me", as well as the Top 40 singles "Because of You" and "Promise Me". This would be the only album to feature original member Sunshine Wright, who would depart the group after the unsuccessful release of second single "Spring Love" and would be replaced by Margo Urban for the remainder of the album's singles. The other two members of the original lineup for this album were Angel Mercado and Caroline Jackson. The album peaked at No. 64 on the Billboard Hot 200 on 26 February 1988 and No. 74 on Billboard's Top R&B/Hip-Hop Albums chart on 4 March 1988.

== Critical reception ==
Alex Henderson of AllMusic wrote in his review that "the Cover Girls made some memorable contributions to Latin freestyle -- in fact, their debut album, Show Me, is among freestyle's most important releases."

Robert Christgau remarked: "Set on pulling a marketable girl group out of a Latin hip hop concept, their svengalis channel the mix toward wall-of-sound, fuzzing beats and harmonies with a nostalgic soupcon of Spectorian grandeur."

== Track listing ==
No.	Title	Writer(s)	Length
1.	"Show Me"	Albert Cabrera; Andy Tripoli; Bobby Khozouri; Tony Moran	3:43
2.	"Because of You"	David Cole	5:38
3.	"That Boy of Mine"	Albert Cabrera; Andy Tripoli; Bobby Khozouri; Tony Moran	4:25
4.	"One Night Affair"	Louis A. Martineé	4:12
5.	"Spring Love"	Pete Warner; Rainy Davis	4:05
6.	"Inside Outside"	Albert Cabrera; Andy Tripoli; Tony Moran; Frederick Hibbert	5:55
7.	"Promise Me"	Albert Cabrera; Andy Tripoli; Tony Moran	6:56
8.	"Love Emergency"	Nick Trevisick; Paul Gurvitz	4:38
Total length:			39:32

== Charts ==
Album - Billboard (United States)

Year	Chart	Position
1988	Billboard Hot 200	64
1988	Billboard Top R&B/Hip-Hop Albums	74

Singles - Billboard (United States)

Year	Single	Chart	Position
1987	"Show Me"	Hot 100	44
1987	"Show Me"	Hot R&B/Hip-Hop Songs	34
1987	"Because of You"	Hot R&B/Hip-Hop Songs	47
1987	"Because of You"	Dance Club Songs	16
1988	"Because of You"	Hot 100	27
1988	"Inside Outside"	Hot 100	55
1988	"Inside Outside"	Dance Club Songs	12
1988	"Promise Me"	Hot 100	40

== Personnel ==
- Angel Clivillés
- Caroline Jackson
- Sunshine Wright
