= Show Me the Monet =

Show Me the Monet may refer to:

- Show Me the Monet (TV series), a British television series
- Show Me the Monet (painting), a 2005 painting by Banksy

== See also ==
- Show Me the Money (disambiguation)
