= Clivillés =

Clivillés is a Spanish surname. Notable people with the surname include:

- Robert Clivillés (born 1964), American artist and record producer
- Angel Clivillés, American singer

== See also ==
- Clivillés + Cole, American pop group
