= Here It Is =

Here It Is may refer to:

== Albums ==
- Here It Is (The Cover Girls album), 1992
- Here It Is (Freddie Jackson album) or the title song, 1994
- Here It Is, by Jevetta Steele, 1993

== Songs ==
- "Here It Is", by Dizzy Gillespie from Dizzy on the French Riviera, 1962
- "Here It Is", by Flo Rida from My House, 2015
- "Here It Is", by Leonard Cohen from Ten New Songs, 2001
