= In Full Bloom (Rose Royce album) =

Studio album by Rose Royce
- Released: July 29, 1977
- Recorded: 1976–1977
- Studio: Sound Factory West (Los Angeles, California); Amigo (Los Angeles, California)
- Genre: Funk, soul, disco
- Length: 41:34
- Label: Whitfield
- Producer: Norman Whitfield

Rose Royce chronology
| Car Wash (1976) | In Full Bloom (1977) | Strikes Again (1978) |

In Full Bloom is the second album by American funk band Rose Royce, released on the Whitfield label in July 1977. It was produced by Norman Whitfield. The album was remastered and reissued with bonus tracks in 2016 by Big Break Records.

== Chart performance ==
The album topped the R&B albums chart. It also reached number nine on the Billboard 200, the band's highest position on the chart. The album spawned two Billboard R&B Top Ten singles, "Do Your Dance (Part 1)" and "Ooh Boy", which reached number four and number three respectively. A third single, "Wishing on a Star", was not as successful in the US, but was a huge hit on the UK Singles Chart, peaking at number three. Another single, "It Makes You Feel Like Dancin'", was released in the UK and peaked at number 16.

== Critical reception ==
Professional ratings
Review scores
| Source | Rating |
|---|---|
| AllMusic | 4/5 stars |

The Bay State Banner called Norwalt "one of the few voices getting air play nowadays who sounds off guard, entirely relaxed."

== Track listing ==
All tracks are written by Norman Whitfield, except where noted.

Side one
| No. | Title | Writer(s) | Length |
|---|---|---|---|
| 1. | "Wishing on a Star" | Billie Calvin | 4:50 |
| 2. | "You Can't Please Everybody" | | 3:47 |
| 3. | "Ooh Boy" | | 4:15 |
| 4. | "Do Your Dance" | Norman Whitfield, Dwight Turner | 9:15 |

Side two
| No. | Title | Writer(s) | Length |
|---|---|---|---|
| 5. | "You're My World Girl" | | 4:08 |
| 6. | "Love, More Love" | | 3:15 |
| 7. | "Funk Factory" | Rose Royce | 3:05 |
| 8. | "It Makes You Feel Like Dancin'" | | 8:13 |

2016 remastered reissue bonus tracks
| No. | Title | Length |
|---|---|---|
| 9. | "Do Your Dance" (Part 1) | 3:30 |
| 10. | "Ooh Boy" (Single version) | 3:50 |
| 11. | "Wishing on a Star" (Single version) | 3:59 |
| 12. | "It Makes You Feel Like Dancin'" (Single version) | 4:27 |

== Personnel ==
Rose Royce

- Rose Norwalt – lead vocals
- Kenny Copeland – trumpet, lead vocals
- Kenji Brown – guitar, lead vocals
- Lequeint "Duke" Jobe – bass, vocals
- Michael Nash – keyboards
- Henry Garner – drums, vocals
- Freddie Dunn – trumpet
- Michael Moore – saxophone
- Terry Santiel – congas

Additional musicians

- Mark Davis – keyboards, ARP, piano
- Melvin "Wah Wah" Watson – guitar
- James Gadson – drums
- Jack Ashford – tambourine, vibes, hotel sheet

Production

- Norman Whitfield – producer, arranger, mastering engineer
- Leanard Jackson – chief recording engineer and mixing
- Steve Smith – recording engineer, mastering engineer
- Steve Maslow – recording engineer, mastering engineer
- Bill Whitfield – album coordinator
- Paul Riser – orchestral direction
- Ed Thrasher – art direction
- Eric Chan/Gribbitt! – album design
- Shusei Nagaoka – cover illustration
- Ron Slenzak – photography

== Charts ==
| Chart (1977) | Peak |
|---|---|
| U.S. Billboard Top LPs | 9 |
| U.S. Billboard Top Soul LPs | 1 |
| UK Albums Chart | 18 |

Singles

| Year | Single | Peak chart positions | | | |
| Year | Single | US | US R&B | US Dan | UK |
|---|---|---|---|---|---|
| 1977 | "Do Your Dance (Part 1)" | 39 | 4 | 20 | 30 |
| 1977 | "It Makes You Feel Like Dancin'" | — | — | 20 | 16 |
| 1977 | "Ooh Boy" | 72 | 3 | — | 46 |
| 1978 | "Wishing on a Star" | 101 | 52 | — | 3 |

== See also ==
- List of Billboard number-one R&B albums of 1977
