= Here It Is (The Cover Girls album) =

Studio album by The Cover Girls
- Released: 1992
- Label: Epic

The Cover Girls chronology
We Can't Go Wrong (1989)	Here It Is (1992)	Satisfy (1996)

Here It Is is an album by the American music group The Cover Girls, released in 1992.

"Wishing on a Star" peaked at No. 9 on the Billboard Hot 100; "Funk Boutique" and "Thank You" peaked at Nos. 55 and 75, respectively.

== Production ==
"Wishing on a Star" is a cover of the song made famous by Rose Royce. The album was recorded with new vocalist Michelle Valentine along with previous members Caroline Jackson and Evelyn Escalera. In 1990 Evelyn Escalera joined Carline Jackson and Margo Urban as the lead singer of The Cover Girls. The group released the song "Don't Stop Now" and was signed to Epic Records. The single for "Don't Stop Now" was released with the B-Side "Funk Boutique". Once Radio and Club DJ's began playing the B-Side "Funk Boutique" the song was quickly released as a single and promotion changed to favor "Funk Boutique". Shortly after the release of "Funk Boutique" Margo Urban left the group. Wanting to take the group in a different direction Fever Records brought in Michelle Valentine to join the group as a co-lead vocalist along with Evelyn Escalera. After the success of "Wishing On A Star" the group recorded a Spanish Version on the song entitled "Estrella Del Amor". The song was very successful in Brazil at that time. The song was a love theme for a popular Soap Opera in Brazil. Soon after the release of "Thank You" Caroline Jackson left the group. Evelyn and Michelle continued to perform as a duo. "If You Want My Love (Here It Is)" was the final single released from the album. Tony Moran contributed production and writing work on the album.

== Critical reception ==
Professional ratings
Review scores
Source	Rating
AllMusic	4/5 stars
Los Angeles Times	2/4 stars
St. Petersburg Times	1/5 stars

The Washington Post deemed the songs "drum-machine-ridden, annoyingly inane cuts." The Baltimore Sun noted that "no matter how closely you listen to the well-polished performances collected here, it's impossible to get any sense of the women behind the voices—or even of any differences between those voices." The St. Petersburg Times determined that "the only track that manages to stay above the waterline is 'Thank You', which only sounds like the remake of a '70s ballad."

AllMusic wrote: "It cannot be denied that dance is a producer-driven genre, and despite the shadiness of non-crediting found here, the grooves are smokin', and the powerhouse lead vocals by Michelle Valentine and Evelyn Escalera are dynamite in the context ... Here It Is is an essential piece for freestyle stalwarts and any fans of '90s club music."

== Track listing ==
No.	Title	Lead vocals	Length
1.	"Wishing on a Star"	Michelle Valentine	4:42
2.	"Funk Boutique"	Evelyn Escalera	6:40
3.	"If You Want My Love (Here It Is)"	Michelle Valentine	4:31
4.	"That Feeling"	Michelle Valentine	5:12
5.	"It's You"	Michelle Valentine	4:52
6.	"Still Miss You"	Evelyn Escalera	5:05
7.	"Thank You"	Michelle Valentine & Evelyn Escalera	5:00
8.	"Gotta Get Up"	Michelle Valentine w/ Evelyn Escalera	5:46
9.	"Always"	Michelle Valentine & Evelyn Escalera	6:01
10.	"Colors"	Evelyn Escalera	4:07
