= Strikes Again =

Studio album by Rose Royce
- Released: August 11, 1978
- Recorded: 1977–1978
- Studio: Fort Knox (Los Angeles, California)
- Genre: Funk, soul, disco
- Length: 39:10
- Label: Whitfield
- Producer: Norman Whitfield

Rose Royce chronology
In Full Bloom (1977)	Strikes Again (1978)	Rainbow Connection IV (1979)

Singles from Strikes Again
- 1. "I'm in Love (And I Love the Feeling)" Released: July 1978; 2. "Love Don't Live Here Anymore" Released: November 1978; 3. "First Come, First Serve" Released: March 1979

Professional ratings
Review scores
Source	Rating
AllMusic	4/5 stars
The Virgin Encyclopedia of R&B and Soul	3/5 stars

Strikes Again is the third album by funk band Rose Royce. It was released on the Whitfield label in August 1978. It was produced by Norman Whitfield.

== History ==
The album peaked at number four on the Billboard R&B albums chart and number 28 on the Billboard Top LPs chart. It yielded two Billboard R&B top ten singles, "I'm in Love (And I Love the Feeling)" and "Love Don't Live Here Anymore". "Love Don't Live Here Anymore" was also successful on the UK Singles Chart, reaching number two, their highest charting single in the UK. A third single, "First Come, First Serve", peaked at number 65 on the Billboard R&B Singles chart. The album was remastered and reissued with bonus tracks in 2016 by Big Break Records.

== Track listing ==
All songs written by Norman Whitfield unless otherwise noted.

Side one
No.	Title	Writer(s)	Length
1.	"Get Up Off Your Fat"		4:35
2.	"Do It, Do It"		4:09
3.	"I'm in Love (And I Love the Feeling)"		3:41
4.	"First Come, First Serve"		3:19
5.	"Love Don't Live Here Anymore"	Miles Gregory	3:56

Side two
No.	Title	Writer(s)	Length
6.	"Angel in the Sky"	Billie Calvin	4:56
7.	"Help"	Robert Daniels	3:53
8.	"Let Me Be the First to Know"	Gregory	3:52
9.	"That's What's Wrong with Me"	Whitfield, Rose Royce	6:37

2016 remastered reissue bonus tracks
No.	Title	Length
10.	"First Come, First Serve" (Single Version)	3:27
11.	"Love Don't Live Here Anymore" (Single Version)	3:51
12.	"That's What's Wrong with Me" (Single Version)	5:33

== Personnel ==
Rose Royce

- Gwen Dickey – lead vocals
- Kenny Copeland – trumpet, lead vocals
- Kenji Brown – guitar, lead vocals
- Lequeint "Duke" Jobe – bass, vocals
- Michael Nash – keyboards
- Henry Garner – drums, vocals
- Freddie Dunn – trumpet
- Michael Moore – saxophone
- Terry Santiel – congas

Additional musicians

- Victor Nyx, Mark Davis – keyboards
- Melvin "Wah Wah" Watson, Cornelius Grant – guitar
- Jimmy Valdez – drums
- Walter Downing – organ
- Mark Kenoly – bass
- Jack Ashford – percussion

Production

- Norman Whitfield: arrangements, production and mastering
- Leanard Jackson: recording and mastering engineer
- Steve Smith: recording engineer
- Gene Page: orchestral direction
- Eleven Twenty-Four Design: art direction, design
- Andy Engel: lettering
- Bobby Holland, Jeffrey Mayer: photography
- Pamela Clare: cover illustration
- Bill Whitfield: album coordinator

== Charts ==
Chart (1978–1979)	Peak position
Australia (Kent Music Report)	44
UK Albums Chart	7
US Billboard Top LPs	28
US Billboard Top Soul LPs	4

Singles

Year	Single	Peak chart positions		
Year	Single	US	US R&B	UK
1978	"I'm in Love (And I Love the Feeling)"	—	5	51
1978	"Love Don't Live Here Anymore"	32	5	2
1979	"First Come, First Serve"	—	65	—
