= We Can't Go Wrong =

Studio album by The Cover Girls
- Released: August 30, 1989
- Studio: D&D Recording Studio, Soundtrack Studio, Quad Recording Studio, Shakedown Sound Studio, Electric Lady Studio, Marathon Recording Studio, & Hip Pocket Recording Studio, New York, New York
- Genre: Dance, R&B, Freestyle
- Length: 49:31
- Label: Capitol/EMI Records; 0777 7 91041 2 3 C2-91041
- Producer: Andy "Panda" Tripoli "Little" Louie Vega; Robert Clivillés & David Cole; Albert Cabrera & Tony Moran (The Latin Rascals)

The Cover Girls chronology
Show Me (1987)	We Can't Go Wrong (1989)	Here It Is (1992)

Singles from We Can't Go Wrong
- 1. "My Heart Skips a Beat" Released: June 28, 1989; 2. "We Can't Go Wrong" Released: October 24, 1989; 3. "All That Glitters Isn't Gold" Released: January 30, 1990

Professional ratings
Review scores
Source	Rating
AllMusic	2.5/5 stars

We Can't Go Wrong is the second album from the New York-based R&B–dance trio The Cover Girls. The album charted at #108 on the Billboard 200. We Can't Go Wrong features songwriting and production by Albert Cabrera, Andy "Panda" Tripoli, David Cole, "Little" Louie Vega, Robert Clivilles, and Tony Moran.

After scoring moderate success with their debut album Show Me in 1987, the group left independent label Fever Records, and signed with Capitol Records for this album, which was released in August 1989. This album contains the same mixture of fine Freestyle dance numbers and soaring R&B-styled ballads as their debut album. Besides the three hit singles released from this album ("My Heart Skips a Beat", "We Can't Go Wrong", and "All That Glitters Isn't Gold"), standout tracks include "Nothing Could Be Better", "That Boy of Mine" (which was also featured on their debut album Show Me), "No One in This World", and a cover version of the Carole King–Gerry Goffin classic "Up on the Roof". This album would be the last one to feature lead singer Angel Clivillés (who would depart the group for a solo career) and Margo Urban who would both be replaced by Evelyn Escalera and Michelle Valentine respectively.

== Track listing ==
No.	Title	Writer(s)	Length
1.	"Once Upon a Time"	Randy Ramos; Albert Cabrera; Mac Quayle	4:17
2.	"My Heart Skips a Beat"	David Cole	5:16
3.	"All That Glitters Isn't Gold"	David Cole	5:46
4.	"Nothing Could Be Better"	Andy Tripoli; Tony Moran	5:18
5.	"That Boy of Mine"	Andy Tripoli; Tony Moran; Albert Cabrera; Bobby Khozouri	4:21
6.	"No One in This World"	David Cole	5:28
7.	"Cute"	Andy Tripoli; Mac Quayle; Angela Sabater	4:55
8.	"Love Mission"	Andy Tripoli; Tony Moran; Mac Quayle	5:25
9.	"We Can't Go Wrong"	Andy Tripoli; Tony Moran; David Cole	5:14
10.	"Up on the Roof"	Gerry Goffin; Carole King	3:31
Total length:			49:31

- Track information and credits verified from the album's liner notes.

== Charts ==
Album - Billboard (United States)

Year	Chart	Position
1989	The Billboard 200	108

Singles - Billboard (United States)

Year	Single	Chart	Position
1989	"My Heart Skips a Beat"	Hot Dance Music/Club Play	4
1989	"My Heart Skips a Beat"	Hot Dance Music/Maxi-Singles Sales	8
1989	"My Heart Skips a Beat"	The Billboard Hot 100	38
1990	"We Can't Go Wrong"	The Billboard Hot 100	8
1990	"All That Glitters Isn't Gold"	Hot Dance Music/Club Play	18
1990	"All That Glitters Isn't Gold"	Hot Dance Music/Maxi-Singles Sales	31
1990	"All That Glitters Isn't Gold"	The Billboard Hot 100	49

We Can't Go Wrong (single)

Year-end chart (1990)	Position
U.S. Billboard Hot 100	87
