= Viktor Reznikov =

Russian composer

Viktor Mikhailovich Reznikov (Russian: Ви́ктор Михайлович Ре́зников; 9 May 1952 in Leningrad – 25 February 1992 in Saint Petersburg) was a Russian Soviet composer, lyricist and singer. He was mostly known for his songs written for Soviet artists such as Alla Pugacheva, Mikhail Boyarsky, Larisa Dolina, Anne Veski, Valery Leontiev, Sofia Rotaru, ensemble Pesniary, Irina Ponarovskaya, Dmitry Malikov, Roza Rymbayeva, Jaak Joala, Irina Otieva, American group The Cover Girls and the Soviet-American group "SUS".

== Death ==
On 22 February 1992 Reznikov crashed his car while driving to take his daughter Anna to his mother. Anna was not injured. The accident occurred in front of the composer's mother, who stood on the other side of the street. Reznikov spent two days at the Military Medical Academy in St. Petersburg, and died on 25 February. He was buried at a Komarovskoye cemetery in the suburbs of St. Petersburg.

== See also ==
- The Cover Girls (single "Don't Stop Now", 1990)
- Music Speaks Louder Than Words (CD released by Epic Records in 1990)
