= Music Speaks Louder Than Words =

Compilation album by Various Artists
- Released: July 1990
- Recorded: 1990
- Genre: Rock
- Label: Epic
- Producer: Various

Music Speaks Louder Than Words is an album released by Epic Records in 1990.

== Overview ==
Artists such as Cyndi Lauper, Atlantic Starr, Roberta Flack, Patti LaBelle, Earth, Wind & Fire, Anne Murray and the Cover Girls featured on the album.

The LP's songs were co-written by American and Soviet musicians and songwriters. A sum of composer royalties went towards the AFS Intercultural Exchanges programme. AFS Intercultural Exchanges is an international body based in 70 countries which places exchange students with host families.

== Critical reception ==
Professional ratings
Review scores
Source	Rating
New York Times	(favourable)

Stephen Holden of the New York Times noted that "the album's songs are all slickly produced".

== Track listing ==
No.	Title	Writer(s)	Length
1.	"Speak To My Heart" (Phoebe Snow)	Todd Cerney, Sue Shifrin & David Tukhmanov	4:17
2.	"Together" (Mickey Thomas)	Paul Chiten, Diane Warren & Oleg Gazmanov	4:40
3.	"I'm From Another Planet" (Animotion)	Tom Kelly, Billy Steinberg, Alan Roy Scott, Sergey Manukyan, Mikk Targo	3:38
4.	"Family Of Man" (Atlantic Starr)	Franne Golde, Tom Kelly, Billy Steinberg, Sergey Manukyan, Mikk Targo	4:38
5.	"Cold Sky" (Cyndi Lauper)	Cyndi Lauper, Franke Previte, Alan Roy Scott, Igor Nikolayev	5:07
6.	"One World" (Earth, Wind & Fire)	Pamela Phillips Oland, Franke Previte, Sergey Manukyan, Mikk Targo	4:20
7.	"Underneath One Sky" (Roberta Flack)	Franne Golde, Wendy Waldman, Igor Krutoy	5:00
8.	"Don't Stop Now" (The Cover Girls)	Todd Cerney, Harold Payne & Viktor Reznikov	4:41
9.	"I Know Your Touch" (Anne Murray)	Albert Hammond, Brenda Russell, Vladimir Matetsky	4:08
10.	"One Heart, One Mind" (Emmanuel)	Gregory Abbott, Alexander Barykin	4:13
11.	"There's Always Love" (Patti LaBelle)	Michael Bolton, Desmond Child, Albert Hammond, Holly Knight, Brenda Russell, Diane Warren, Vladimir Matetsky	4:30
