= Show Me (The Cover Girls song) =

1986 single by The Cover Girls

Single by The Cover Girls

from the album Show Me
- Released: October 28, 1986
- Recorded: 1986
- Genre: Freestyle; electropop
- Length: 3:43
- Label: Fever Records
- Songwriters: Albert Cabrera; Dr. Bob Khozouri; Tony Moran; Andy Panda
- Producer: "The Latin Rascals"

The Cover Girls singles chronology
"Show Me" (1986)	"Spring Love" (1987)

"Show Me" is the debut single by American freestyle girl group the Cover Girls. First released as a 12" single on October 28, 1986, "Show Me" first charted on the US Hot Dance Club Play chart, where it peaked at #4 in March 1987. Following the song's successful run on the dance chart, it was then released to radio, where it reached #44 on the Billboard Hot 100 chart in May 1987, remaining in the Hot 100 for 18 weeks. The exposure the group received from this song led to an album deal, and the album Show Me was released later on February 24, 1987. The Cover Girls became among the first in a wave of freestyle musical artists to enjoy chart hits in the late 1980s; other associated acts include Exposé, Stevie B and Lisa Lisa and Cult Jam. The song was also popular in Japan, where it reached number one on the Oricon Western singles chart in November 1987, spawning a number one Japanese-language remake by Yukari Morikawa, one of several songs that has come to define the boom times of the 1980s.

In 2000, former lead singer of the Cover Girls Angel Clivillés released an updated version of "Show Me" that was remixed and produced by DJ Tony Moran. Her recording was a hit in the US dance clubs, spending one week at #1 on the Hot Dance Club Play chart in June of that year. This version appeared on her solo album Angel, which was released in 1999.

Billboard named the song #49 on their list of 100 Greatest Girl Group Songs of All Time.

== Track listing ==
When printed on the 12" releases, the durations of the Drumapella and Heartthrob mixes are often misstated as 4:40 and 7:35, respectively. Duration of the Drumapella on the 7" is not confirmed.

US 12" Single
No.	Title	Length
1.	"Show Me" (The Nest Mix)	7:35
2.	"Show Me" (Drumapella)	5:24
3.	"Show Me" (Heartthrob Mix)	7:51
4.	"Show Me" (Florida Mix)	5:44

Germany 12" Single
No.	Title	Length
1.	"Show Me" (The Nest Mix)	7:35
2.	"Show Me" (Hearthrob Mix)	7:51

US 12" Promo
No.	Title	Length
1.	"Show Me" (Edited Version)	5:32
2.	"Show Me" (Extended Version)	7:35

US 7" Single
No.	Title	Length
1.	"Show Me"	3:43
2.	"Show Me" (Drumapella)	4:40

== Charts ==
=== Weekly charts ===
Weekly chart performance for "Show Me"
Chart (1987)	Peak position
US Billboard Hot 100	44
US Dance Club Songs (Billboard) Remix	4
US Hot R&B/Hip-Hop Songs (Billboard)	34

=== Year-end charts ===
1987 year-end chart performance for "Show Me"
Chart (1987)	Position
US Hot Crossover Singles (Billboard)	25

=== Angel Clivillés version ===
Chart (2000)	Peak Position
U.S. Hot Dance Club Play	1

== Other versions ==
The Cover Girls' "Show Me" was popular in Japan, where it reached number one on the Oricon Western singles chart in November 1987. That same year Yukari Morikawa recorded a version for her debut album, Show Me. Released in October 1987, the song was her leadoff single from the album and was also called "Show Me" (ショウ・ミー). It retains the freestyle beat of the original, but features all Japanese lyrics (except for "show me") by Hiromi Mori. It reached number one on the Oricon Singles Chart on 30 November 1987 and sold over a million copies, helping propel both Morikawa and Mori to stardom. The song was used as the theme for the TBS drama Seven Men and Women, Autumn Story and garnered a Japan Cable Award for best song.

Samantha Lam released a version on her 1988 album Sátyut (灑脫) titled "Pomuhng" (破夢, lit. "broken dreams") with Cantonese lyrics by the prolific Hong Kong songsmith Keith Chan. Musically, it is similar to both the Cover Girls' original and Morikawa's remake.

== See also ==
- List of number-one dance hits (United States)
