= Rainbow Connection IV =

Studio album by Rose Royce
- Released: August 17, 1979
- Studios: Fort Knox (Los Angeles, California)
- Genres: Funk, soul, disco
- Length: 44:30
- Label: Whitfield
- Producer: Norman Whitfield

Rose Royce chronology
Strikes Again (1978)	Rainbow Connection IV (1979)	Greatest Hits (1980)

Singles from Rainbow Connection IV
- 1. "Is It Love You're After" Released: August 1979; 2. "What You Waitin' For" Released: November 1979

Professional ratings
Review scores
Source	Rating
AllMusic	4/5 stars
Smash Hits	8/10
The Virgin Encyclopedia of R&B and Soul	2/5 stars

Rainbow Connection IV is the fourth album by the funk band Rose Royce, released on the Whitfield label in 1979. It was produced by Norman Whitfield. This would be the last album to include lead singer Gwen Dickey before she left the group to embark on a solo career.

== History ==
The album peaked at No. 22 on the R&B albums chart. It also reached No. 74 on the Billboard 200. Two singles were released from the album, "Is It Love You're After" and "What You Waitin' For". "Is It Love You're After" peaked at No. 31 on the Billboard R&B Singles chart. It was more successful on the UK Singles Chart, reaching No. 13. "What You Waitin' For" failed to chart. The album was digitally remastered and reissued on CD in 2010 by Wounded Bird Records.

== Track listing ==
Side one
No.	Title	Writer(s)	Length
1.	"I Wonder Where You Are Tonight"	Robert Daniels	3:37
2.	"Is It Love You're After"	Miles Gregory	5:01
3.	"Shine Your Light"	Robert Daniels	5:26
4.	"What You Waitin' For"	Norman Whitfield	8:54

Side two
No.	Title	Writer(s)	Length
1.	"Bad Mother Funker"	Norman Whitfield	4:41
2.	"You Can't Run from Yourself"	Norman Whitfield	5:43
3.	"Lock It Down"	Miles Gregory	5:59
4.	"Pazazz"	Michael Nash	4:47

== Personnel ==
Rose Royce

- Gwen Dickey – lead vocals
- Kenny Copeland – trumpet, lead vocals
- Kenji Brown – guitar, lead vocals
- Lequeint "Duke" Jobe – bass, vocals
- Michael Nash – keyboards
- Henry Garner – drums, vocals
- Freddie Dunn – trumpet
- Michael Moore – saxophone
- Terry Santiel – congas

Additional musicians

- Walter Downing – clavinet, Rhodes piano
- Lafayette Trey Stone, Isy Martin, Wah Wah Watson – guitar
- Jack Ashford – tambourine, cowbell

Production

- Norman Whitfield – producer, arranger, mixing engineer, album concept
- Michael Nash – producer ("Pazazz")
- Bruce Miller – string and horn arrangements
- Leanard Jackson, Steve Smith – recording engineer, mixing engineer
- Norman Moore – cover design
- Scott Hensell – photography
- Tim Bryant/Gribbitt! – art direction
- Bill Whitfield – album coordinator

== Charts ==
Chart (1979)	Peak position
U.S. Billboard Top LPs	74
U.S. Billboard Top Soul LPs	22
UK Albums Chart	72

Singles

Year	Single	Peak chart positions		
Year	Single	US	US R&B	UK
1979	"Is It Love You're After"	105	31	13
1979	"What You Waitin' For"	—	—	—
