= Gwen Dickey =

American musician

- Also known as: Rose Norwalt
- Born: Gwenetta Dickey; December 1, 1953 (age 72); Biloxi, Mississippi, U.S.
- Genres: R&B; disco; soul; funk
- Occupations: Singer; songwriter; record producer
- Instrument: Vocals
- Years active: 1973–present
- Labels: Swanyard; Joey Boy; Whitfield
- Member of: Rose Royce

Gwen Dickey (born December 1, 1953) is an American musician. She is best known as the lead singer of the disco band Rose Royce, where she performed under the name Rose Norwalt. Notable songs from the group include "Car Wash" and "Wishing on a Star". In 1976, their US Billboard Hot 100 number-one single "Car Wash" brought Dickey and the band acclaim and success. After leaving the band in 1980, Dickey moved to the United Kingdom, where she continued a solo career.

== Early life ==
Gwenetta Dickey was born in Biloxi, Mississippi, on December 1, 1953. Her father was a minister of local church. During her tenure in high school, she joined the school choir. After graduating from high school, she relocated to Miami, Florida where she briefly attended the University of Miami. Initially, Dickey was planning to pursue a career as flight attendant. Her vocals were discovered by Betty Wright, who she met at the college. Impressed by her vocals, Wright later introduced her to a few music producers.

== Career ==
=== 1973–1974: Career beginnings ===
To pursue her music career, she joined a female band called Friday, Saturday, Sunday. The band opened for music acts including James Brown and The Spinners. The band later renamed themselves The Jewels. During a tour stop in Miami, she attracted the attention of Joe Harris of The Undisputed Truth, who was looking for a female replacement for his group. After selecting Dickey, she was flown to Los Angeles to audition for their music producer and record label CEO Norman Whitfield. After the audition, Whitfield instead placed her in his newly signed group Rose Royce.

=== 1975–1980: Rose Royce ===
After joining Rose Royce, Whitfield gave Dickey the stage name Rose Norwalt; taking the name "Rose" to symbolize Dickey and last name "Norwalt" as an amalgamation of the names Norman [Whitfield] and his sound engineer Walter. In 1976, Rose Royce released their debut single and first major hit, "Car Wash", which topped the US Billboard Hot 100 and sold over two million copies worldwide. The single preceded their debut album, Car Wash (1976). Serving as both the group's first album and the soundtrack for American comedy film Car Wash, the album became an international success. The group's second album, In Full Bloom, was released in July 1979 and peaked at number nine on the US Billboard 200, later achieving multi-platinum status in the country. The record spawned the singles "Do Your Dance (Part 1)", "Ooh Boy", and "Wishing on a Star"; all of which became top-ten hits in several countries.

Rose Royce's third studio album, Strikes Again, was released in August 1978. The album produced a final top-40 hit on US Billboard Hot 100 called "Love Don't Live Here Anymore". During this time, conflicts began surfacing within Rose Royce as the band felt Dickey was becoming the star attraction. Dickey recorded her final album with the band titled Rainbow Connection IV, released in 1979 to minor success. In April 1980, she left Rose Royce due to friction with the band and briefly went into solitude. As a result, Normal Whitfield offered a financial reward to the public for Dickey's location. She was later found by Rose Royce members Henry Garner and Duke Jobe who brought her to Whitfield in a failed attempt reconcile the group. Dickey later moved back to Florida.

=== 1987–2010: Time to Change and solo career ===
In the late 1980s, Dickey released two singles "I'm in Love Again" (1987) and "Why Can't We Be Lovers" (1988) on Florida-based record label Joey Boy Records. She later relocated to London where she briefly signed to Swanyard Records. She released a re-recorded single version of "Car Wash" on Swanyard Records in 1990. Her version peaked at number seventy on the UK Singles chart. In 1993, Dickey released her debut solo album Time to Change on Victor Records, which spawned the single "Don't Stop". In 1994, Dickey and KWS released a cover of Chaka Khan's song "Ain't Nobody", which peaked at number twenty-one on the UK Singles chart.

In 1998, Dickey sang a duet with rapper Jay-Z on a cover of Rose Royce's "Wishing on a Star", which peaked at number thirteen on the UK Singles charts. In the same year, Dickey also provided guest vocals on the song "Flying" by Romeo for the soundtrack of the movie "Albeltje". In 2001, she headlined a concert tour called What A Feeling! which was released as a concert film titled Gwen Dickey & Limahl - What a Feeling! II. In 2010, Dickey and her former Rose Royce band members appeared in an episode Unsung.

=== 2017–present: This is Gwen Dickey and later career ===
In 2017, she formed her own version of Rose Royce and began touring in the United Kingdom as Gwen Dickey's Rose Royce. In 2022, she was featured on the Giants of Soul Tour. In 2024, Dickey released an extended play titled This is Gwen Dickey, featuring four tracks.

== Personal life ==
In 2010, Dickey suffered a spinal cord injury in her London home, leaving her reliant on a wheelchair.

== Discography ==
- Time to Change (1993)
- This Is Gwen Dickey (2024)

=== Singles ===
Title	Year	Peak chart positions			Album
Title	Year	UK	UK R&B	UK Dance	Album
"I'm in Love Again"	1987	—	—	—	Non-album singles
"Why Can't We Be Lovers"	1988	—	—	—	Non-album singles
"Car Wash"	1990	72	—	14	Non-album singles
"Don't Stop"	1993	—	—	—	Time to Change
"Ain't Nobody" (featuring KWS)	1994	21	—	12	Non-album singles
"The Best is Yet to Come"	1995	—	—	—	Non-album singles
"One Too Many Heartaches"	1996	—	—	—	Non-album singles
"Water"	2024	—	—	—	This Is Gwen Dickey
"If I'm Gonna Be With You"	2025	—	—	—	This Is Gwen Dickey

=== Featured singles ===
Title	Year	Peak chart positions			Album
Title	Year	UK	UK R&B	UK Dance	Album
"It's In Her Kiss" (Kikitup featuring Gwen Dickey, Jack Radics, and Red Dragon)	1995	—	—	—	Non-album single
"Flying" (Roméo featuring Gwen Dickey)	1998	—	—	—	Non-album single
"Wishing on a Star" (Jay-Z featuring Gwen Dickey)	1998	13	5	—	In My Lifetime, Vol. 1
"Car Wash" (Rose Royce featuring Gwen Dickey)	1998	18	—	14	Non-album singles
"Last Christmas" (Le Groove featuring Gwen Dickey)	1998	82	—	—	Non-album singles
