= Show Me the Money (British TV programme) =

- Genre: Business
- Presented by: Declan Curry
- Country of origin: United Kingdom
- Original language: English
- No. of episodes: 109

Production
- Running time: 30 mins

Original release
- Release: 31 October 2010 – 24 February 2013

Show Me the Money is a British topical debate programme that aired on BBC. The shows typically featured three top bosses and entrepreneurs who debated about who was making money and how they were doing it. This series began on 31 October 2010 and ended on 24 February 2013. It was shown on BBC News at 9:30 pm on Sundays.
