= The Cover Girls =

American freestyle girl group

- Origin: New York City, U.S.
- Genres: Freestyle
- Years active: 1986–1996, 2001–present
- Labels: Fever; Capitol; EMI; Epic; SME
- Members: Evelyn Escalera; Sabrina Nieves; Lorraine Munoz
- Past members: Sunshine Wright; Angel Clivilles; Caroline Jackson; Margo Urban; Michelle Valentine

The Cover Girls are a New York City based American freestyle music girl group originally consisted of Louise "Angel" Sabater, Caroline Jackson, and Sunshine Wright. Formed in 1986, The Cover Girls peaked at #44 on the Billboard Hot 100 with their debut single "Show Me", taken from their debut studio album of the same name. Shortly after the release of their second single "Spring Love", Wright departed from the group and was replaced by Margo Urban. The group's second studio album We Can't Go Wrong was released in 1989, producing the #8 hit single of the same name.

Shortly after the release of their second studio album, Louise "Angel" Sabater departed from the group and was replaced by Evelyn Escalera. The line-up comprising Jackson, Urban, and Escalera released one single, "Don't Stop Now", taken from the compilation album Music Speaks Louder Than Words. In 1992, Urban left the group and was replaced by Michelle Valentine. The group's third studio album Here It Is, was released in June 1992 which produced the hit singles "Wishing on a Star" & “Thank You”. Shortly after the release of the album, Jackson departed from the group leaving Escalera and Valentine as a duo.

As of 2026, The Cover Girls are composed of Evelyn Escalera, Lorraine Munoz and Sabrina Nieves, under Fever Management. Former lead singer Louise "Angel" Mercado performs alongside Adrianna Roscio (who replaced Margo Urban in January 2026) and Michelle Viana (who replaced Michelle Valentine in 2024), as The Original Cover Girls (Featuring Angel the OCG).

== History ==
The Cover Girls were formed by music producer and songwriter Andy "Panda" Tripoli and music promoter and dance club owner Sal Abbatiello. The group was originally composed of singers Louise "Angel" Sabater, Caroline Jackson, and Sunshine Wright. In late 1986, they released their first album, Show Me. Five singles were released from this album, including the Top 40, Billboard Hot 100 hits "Show Me" and "Promise Me". Sunshine Wright left the group in late 1987 after the release of the album and its second single "Spring Love", and was replaced by Margo Urban. In 1988, they recorded the song "Better Late Than Never" for the Coming to America film soundtrack.

In 1989, their second album, We Can't Go Wrong, was released and included the song "My Heart Skips a Beat" as well as the title track. The Cover Girls performed "My Heart Skips a Beat" and "We Can't Go Wrong" on the series finale of American Bandstand in October 1989. "All That Glitters Isn't Gold" was the third and final single released from the We Can't Go Wrong album. Shortly after its release, Louise "Angel" Sabater left the group and was replaced on lead vocals by Evelyn Escalera.

The first song recorded with Escalera on lead was "Don't Stop Now", released for the compilation album Music Speaks Louder Than Words, which was a joint collaboration between American and Soviet songwriters. The song's music is a cover of Russian artist Viktor Reznikov's 1988 song "Domovoy", with new English lyrics written by Todd Cerney and Harold Payne. The song was released as a single in 1990 with "Funk Boutique" originally as the B-Side.

In 1992, they released their third studio album, Here It Is, which features for the first time two lead singers, Escalera and Michelle Valentine, who replaced Margo Urban, who left the group a year prior. This album produced a cover version of the Rose Royce 1978 song "Wishing on a Star". The second and third singles were "Thank You" and "If You Want My Love (Here It Is)". Following the release of "Thank You" Caroline Jackson left the group. And Escalera and Valentine continued as a duo. In 1993, Escalera recorded vocals on a promotional single titled "Can You Feel It" by Fish released on Cupid Records.

In 1994, the group contributed the new song "You Better Change" to the soundtrack of the film I Like It Like That.

In 1996, they released their fourth and final album, titled, Satisfy. Lead and background vocals on this album was handled by Valentine, Gayle Ellis and Nicki Richards. The first single from the album, "I Am Woman", was released originally with Valentine on lead vocals. But shortly after the single was released Valentine left the group. Lead vocals were then taken over by Gayle Ellis. On "I Need Your Lovin'", the vocals on the album mix were by Valentine and the single remix vocals were handled by Ellis and Evelyn Escalera, whom then returned to the group from a hiatus. Nicki Richards also recorded lead vocals on some of the Satisfy album tracks, notably "Whenever You Need Me" and "Keep on Giving Me Love".

In 2001, The Cover Girls re-grouped with Evelyn Escalera, and two new members Sabrina Nieves and Lorraine Munoz.

In 2006, The Cover Girls contributed vocals on the Cobra Starship song "The Ballad of Big Poppa and Diamond Girl" from the Cobra Starship album While the City Sleeps, We Rule the Streets.

In November 2008, Evelyn Escalera released her first solo single, a cover of the Mariah Carey Christmas classic "All I Want for Christmas Is You", under her new pseudonym Evelyn DeMille.

In 2010, Evelyn Escalera contributed the track "Grown Up Christmas List" to the album A Traditional Freestyle Christmas Vol 1.

In 2011, The "Original" Cover Girls featuring Louise "Angel" Mercado, Caroline Jackson and Margo Urban reunited with a performance at the 2011 Long Beach Pride festival. On May 17, 2022, The "Original" Cover Girls, (Angel, Sunshine & Margo) performed on the last episode of The Wendy Williams Show, hosted by Leah Remini and Michelle Visage.

On November 7, 2015, the Cover Girls (Escalera, Munoz, and Nieves) were featured in a documentary on freestyle music titled Legends of Freestyle, which interviewed freestyle artists and delved into the history and movement of this genre. The documentary presented by Stanulis Productions premiered at the HBO Urban Action Film Festival at the AMC Theater on November 7, 2015, in New York City.

In 2021, original member Caroline Jackson retired from the group, and was replaced by former member Michelle Valentine. Valentine departed the group again in 2024 and was replaced by Michelle Viana.

In 2026, Margo Urban departed the group again and was replaced by Adrianna Roscio.

== Discography ==
=== Studio albums ===
Year	Album details	Peak chart positions	
Year	Album details	US	US R&B
1986	Show Me: Release date: November 30, 1986; Label: Fever	64	74
1989	We Can't Go Wrong: Release date: August 8, 1989; Label: Capitol	108	—
1992	Here It Is: Release date: June 2, 1992; Label: Epic	—	—
1996	Satisfy: Release date: August 20, 1996; Label: Quality	—	—
"—" denotes a recording that did not chart or was not released in that territory.

=== Compilation albums ===
Year	Album details
1998	Greatest Hits: Released: July 2, 1998; Label: Mars
1998	Greatest Hits: Released: July 14, 1998; Label: Warlock/Fever Records

=== Singles ===
Year	Single	Peak chart positions					Album
Year	Single	US	US R&B	US Dan	AUS	UK	Album
1987	"Show Me"	44	34	4	—	—	Show Me
1987	"Spring Love"	98	82	—	—	—	Show Me
1987	"Because of You"	27	47	16	—	—	Show Me
1988	"Promise Me"	40	—	—	—	—	Show Me
1988	"Inside Outside"	55	—	12	—	—	Show Me
1988	"Better Late Than Never"	—	—	—	—	—	Coming to America OST
1989	"My Heart Skips a Beat"	38	—	4	—	—	We Can't Go Wrong
1989	"We Can't Go Wrong"	8	—	—	—	—	We Can't Go Wrong
1990	"All That Glitters Isn't Gold"	49	—	18	—	—	We Can't Go Wrong
1990	"Don't Stop Now"	63	—	8	—	—	Music Speaks Louder Than Words
1991	"Funk Boutique"	55	—	8	150	—	Here It Is
1992	"Wishing on a Star"	9	19	7	181	38	Here It Is
1992	"Thank You"	75	—	—	—	—	Here It Is
1993	"If You Want My Love (Here It Is)"	125	—	8	—	—	Here It Is
1993	"Estrella Del Amor (Wishing On a Star)"	—	—	—	—	—	Sony Discos Brazil promotional single
1996	"I Am Woman"	—	—	—	—	—	Satisfy
1996	"I Need Your Lovin'"	—	—	—	—	—	Satisfy
2002	"Hooked On You (Remix)"	—	—	—	—	—	Promotional single
"—" denotes a recording that did not chart or was not released in that territory.
