= Is It Love You're After? =

Single by Rose Royce

from the album Rainbow Connection IV
- B-side: "You Can't Run From Yourself"
- Released: 1979
- Recorded: 1979
- Genre: Disco
- Length: 3:50
- Label: Warner Bros. Records
- Songwriter: Miles Gregory

Rose Royce singles chronology
"First Come, First Serve" (1979)	"Is It Love You're After?" (1979)	"What You Waitin' For" (1979)

Official video
- "Is It Love You're After?" on YouTube

"Is It Love You're After?" is a 1979 song by Rose Royce from the 1979 album Rainbow Connection IV, which was the last album with lead singer Gwen Dickey before she left to embark on a solo career. It was also the band's fourth highest-charting single in the UK.

== Chart performance ==
Chart (1979–1980)	Peak Position
Belgium	23
Ireland	17
Netherlands	42
UK (The Official Charts Company)	13
US	105
US Hot Soul Singles	31

== Personnel ==
- Gwen Dickey – lead vocals
- Kenny Copeland – trumpet
- Kenji Brown – guitar
- Lequeint "Duke" Jobe – bass
- Michael Nash – keyboards
- Henry Garner – drums
- Freddie Dunn – trumpet
- Michael Moore – saxophone
- Terry Santiel – congas

== Samples ==
- The brass riff of the song was sampled for S'Express' 1988 song "Theme From S'Express," which reached no. 1 in the UK.
