= Show Me the Money =

Show Me the Money may refer to:

- "Show me the money", a well-known phrase uttered by characters in the 1996 film Jerry Maguire
- Show Me the Money (South Korean TV series), a South Korean music/rap competition show
- Show Me the Money (British TV programme), a 2010–2013 British topical debate television programme that aired on BBC
- Show Me the Money (British game show), a 1998–1999 British game show which aired on Channel 4
- Show Me the Money (American game show), a short-lived 2006 American game show hosted by William Shatner that aired on ABC
- "Show Me the Money" (Robin Hood episode)
- "Show Me the Money", a 2001 song by UK garage duo Architechs
