= Spyder Turner =

American soul singer (born 1947)

Spyder Turner (born Dwight David Turner, February 4, 1947, Beckley, West Virginia) is an American soul singer. Turner was raised in Detroit, and sang in doo wop groups and high school choirs while young. He first began recording after winning a contest at the Apollo Theater in New York City, recording some solo sides and singing backup for several groups including The Stereophonics and The Fabulous Counts.

== Stand By Me ==
In 1966, record producer Clay McMurray had Turner's group do a recording session, and soon after Turner was signed to MGM Records. The label released his cover version of the soul hit "Stand by Me." In the song, Turner not only imitated the voices of Ben E. King, Smokey Robinson, Chuck Jackson and Billy Stewart, among others, but named them as he sang verses of the song in their style. The tune climbed to No. 3 on the U.S. Billboard R&B Singles chart and No.12 on the Billboard Hot 100 chart early in 1967. Soon after, a full-length album was released, peaking at No.14 on the R&B Albums chart and No.158 on the Billboard 200. A second single from the album, "I Can't Make it Anymore", peaked at No.95 on the Hot 100 pop chart.

Turner left his management after dissatisfaction with MGM's soul division which consisted only of Howard Tate and himself. He played regionally in the South in the early 1970s.

== Other work ==
Later that decade, Turner began working with Norman Whitfield, and wrote the tune "Do Your Dance" for Rose Royce, which was a top ten R&B hit. He continued recording in the late 1970s and early 1980s, including a song for the movie The Last Dragon (billed on the soundtrack as Dwight David). He did some acting as well. He continues to perform in Michigan, and released his most recent album in 2006 through CD Baby.

In March 2008 Turner appeared on Englishman Carl Dixon's BandTraxs session at Studio A/Detroit, where he provided vocals and writing skills to complete the songs, along with singers Pree, Gayle Butts and other Detroit musicians including Dennis Coffey (co producer) and Uriel Jones. Turner performed lead and backing on "Tell me (crying over you)","Glory fleeting" and in addition backing vocals on "Suddenly there's you", and as group personnel of 'BandTraxs' singing on the funk/rap styled "Detroit (city by the river)". The session was arranged by ex-Motown arranger David J. Van De -Pitte.

15% of the cover price of Spyder's single "I'm Gonna Miss You", penned by Frances Nero and released on February 1, 2010, is being donated to the Haiti Recovery Fund.

== Discography ==
- Stand By Me (MGM Records, 1967; reissued on CD, 1996)
- Music Web (Whitfield Records/Warner Bros. Records, 1978)
- Only Love (Whitfield)
- Spyder Turner EP (Self-released, 2006)
- Tell me (crying over you) (BandTraxs Records) 2009
