= Wishing on a Star =

1978 single by Rose Royce

- US single of the Rose Royce recording

Single by Rose Royce

from the album In Full Bloom
- B-side: "Love, More Love"
- Released: 1978
- Recorded: 1977
- Genre: Soul/R&B
- Length: 4:52 (album version); 3:57 (single version)
- Label: Whitfield
- Songwriter: Billie Rae Calvin
- Producer: Norman Whitfield

Rose Royce singles chronology
"Ooh Boy" (1977)	"Wishing on a Star" (1978)	"It Makes You Feel Like Dancin'" (1978)

Music video
- Rose Royce - Wishing On A Star on YouTube

"Wishing on a Star" is a ballad first recorded by American soul and R&B group Rose Royce. It was written by former Undisputed Truth member Billie Rae Calvin, and produced by Norman Whitfield. The song was originally offered to Barbra Streisand for an album project but she declined. It was first released as a single by Rose Royce in 1977 and has since been recorded by numerous acts including the Cover Girls in 1992, Jay-Z in 1998, Beyoncé in 2005, and Seal in 2011.

== Rose Royce version ==
Included on their second album, In Full Bloom (1977), "Wishing on a Star" is a slow ballad written by former Undisputed Truth member Billie Rae Calvin and produced by Norman Whitfield. It was sung by Gwen Dickey under her stage name. The lyrics concern a woman longing for the return of an ex-lover so that they can resume their relationship. The original version of "Wishing on a Star" peaked at number 52 on the Billboard R&B singles chart.

=== Charts ===
Chart (1978)	Peak position
Belgium (Ultratop Flanders)	22
Belgium (VRT Top 30)	14
Netherlands (Dutch Top 40)	14
Netherlands (Single Top 100)	15
UK Singles (OCC)	3
US Bubbling Under Hot 100 Singles (Billboard)	1
US Hot Soul Singles (Billboard)	52

== Fresh 4 version ==
British DJ and production group Fresh 4 released their cover in September 1989. The group consisted of Paul Southey (Suv), Krust, Judge and Flynn Thompson. It was produced by Smith & Mighty and featured Lizz E, and became the group's only notable UK hit, peaking at number 10 on the UK Singles Chart.

=== Charts ===
Chart (1989)	Peak position
Ireland (IRMA)	22
UK Singles (OCC)	10

== The Cover Girls version ==
"Wishing on a Star"

Single by the Cover Girls

from the album Here It Is
- Released: May 1992
- Length: 4:05 (single edit); 4:44 (album version)
- Label: Epic
- Songwriter: Billie Rae Calvin
- Producers: Tony Moran; Andy Marvel

The Cover Girls singles chronology
"Funk Boutique" (1991)	"Wishing on a Star" (1992)	"Thank You'" (1992)

Music video
- The Cover Girls - Wishing On A Star (original composition) on YouTube

Music video
- "Wishing on a Star" (remix) by the Cover Girls on YouTube

American freestyle music girl group The Cover Girls recorded a cover of the song in 1992 for their third album, Here It Is (1992). Released by Epic Records, it was the first single featuring new lead singer Michelle Valentine. The group's version peaked at numbers two and nine on the US Cash Box Top 100 and Billboard Hot 100, and became the 40th/49th biggest single of 1992 in America. While the group had had success in America up to that point, the single was their first single to become a hit when it was released in Europe, peaking at number six in the Netherlands and number 38 in the UK.

In Brazil, this version gained popularity after being included in the soap opera De Corpo e Alma soundtrack, being the theme of the character Yasmin Bianchi, who was played by actress Daniella Perez.

The Cover Girls also recorded a Spanish version of the song, entitled "Estrella del Amor."

=== Formats and track listings ===
==== CD ====
1. "Wishing on a Star (Radio edit)"
2. "Wishing on a Star (Spanish version)"

==== CD Maxi ====
1. "Wishing on a Star (7-inch version)"
2. "Wishing on a Star (12-inch mix)"
3. "Wishing on a Star (Magic Sessions Dub 1)"
4. "Wishing on a Star (Magic Sessions Vocal Dub)"
5. "Wishing on a Star (Jeep 12-inch)"

==== Vinyl ====
A-Side

1. "Wishing on a Star (12-inch Mix)"
2. "Wishing on a Star (Jeep 12-inch)"
3. "Wishing on a Star (Magic Sessions Dub 1)"

B-Side

1. "Wishing on a Star (TNT Dub)"
2. "Wishing on a Star (Amigo Dub)"
3. "Wishing on a Star (Acapella)"

=== Charts ===
==== Weekly charts ====
Chart (1992)	Peak position
Australia (ARIA)	181
Belgium (Ultratop 50 Flanders)	26
Canada Top Singles (RPM)	46
Europe (European Dance Radio)	20
Germany (Official German Charts)	76
Netherlands (Dutch Top 40)	4
Netherlands (Single Top 100)	6
UK Singles (OCC)	38
UK Dance (Music Week)	5
UK Club Chart (Music Week)	7
US Billboard Hot 100	9
US Hot Dance Club Play (Billboard)	7
US Hot R&B Singles (Billboard)	19
US Cash Box Top 100	2

==== Year-end charts ====
Chart (1992)	Position
Brazil (Crowley)	23
US Billboard Hot 100	49
US Cash Box Top 100	40

== Randy Crawford version ==
"Wishing on a Star"

Single by Randy Crawford

from the album Every Kind of Mood: Raandy, Randi, Randee
- Released: September 1998
- Length: 3:59 (single edit), 4:50 (album version)
- Label: WEA
- Songwriter: Billie Rae Calvin
- Producer: Mousse T.

Randy Crawford singles chronology
"Silence" (1998)	"Wishing on a Star" (1998)	"The Captain of Her Heart" (1998)

American jazz and R&B singer Randy Crawford recorded a cover of the song for her 1998 album Every Kind of Mood: Randy, Randi, Randee. The song was produced by Mousse T., and released as the third single off the album in September 1998.

=== Charts ===
Chart (1998)	Peak position
Germany (Official German Charts)	83
UK Singles (OCC)	90
UK R&B (OCC)	21
US Hot Dance Club Play (Billboard)	14

== Jay-Z version ==
"Wishing on a Star"
- An editor has nominated the above file for discussion of its purpose and/or potential deletion. You are welcome to participate in the discussion and help reach a consensus.

Single by Jay-Z featuring Gwen Dickey

from the album In My Lifetime, Vol. 1 (UK Edition)
- Released: March 11, 1998
- Recorded: 1997
- Length: 5:54
- Label: Roc-A-Fella; Def Jam
- Songwriters: Shawn Carter; Billie Ray Calvin
- Producer: Trackmasters

Jay-Z singles chronology
"Be Alone No More" (1998)	"Wishing on a Star" (1998)	"It's Alright" (1998)

Gwen Dickey singles chronology
"One Too Many Heartaches" (1996)	"Wishing on a Star" (1998)

Music video
- "Wishing on a Star" on YouTube

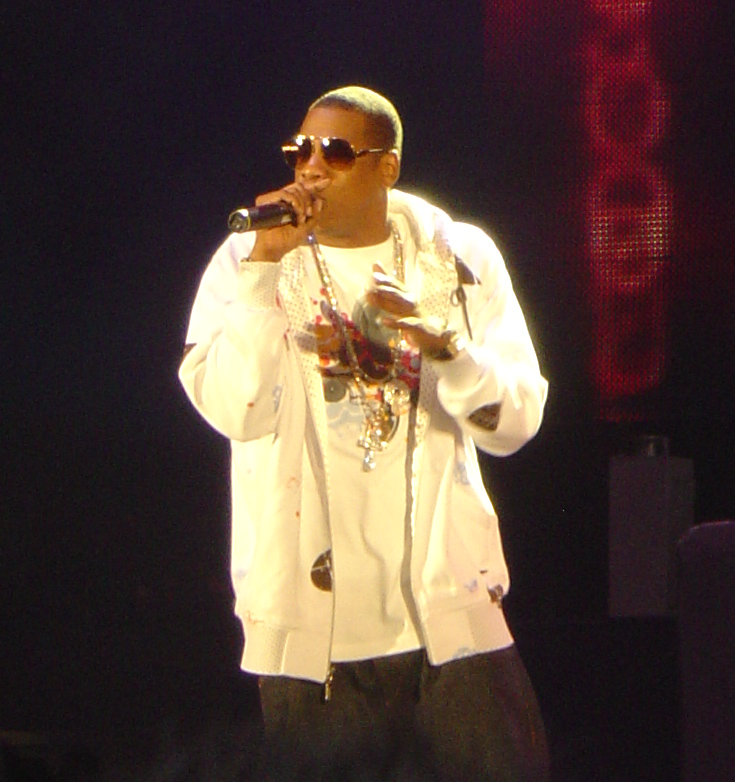
Jay-Z, 2006

American rapper Jay-Z covered Wishing on a Star, featuring Gwen Dickey of Rose Royce, in 1998. It was included on the United Kingdom release of In My Lifetime, Vol. 1 and Greatest Hits. The D'Influence remix can be found on Chapter One: Greatest Hits and Bring It On: The Best of Jay Z.

A music video for the song was also released, showing a child actor David Sincere Aiken portraying Jay-Z growing up in Marcy Houses. Jay-Z himself does not appear in the video played by celebrity choreographer David Sincere Aiken .

=== Critical reception ===
British magazine Music Week gave the song four out of five, writing, "This cover keeps close to the original with Dickey's vocals leaving Jay Z to add a Nineties feel with his rap. This should prove to be his most successful hit yet." Rose Royce's Dickey was also complimented as the "real highlight" of the cover.

=== Track listings ===
==== CD ====
1. "Wishing on a Star (Radio Edit)"
2. "Wishing on a Star (Trackmasters Remix)"
3. "Wishing on a Star (D Influence Remix)"
4. "Brooklyn's Finest"
5. "Wishing on a Star (Trackmasters Acappella)"

==== Vinyl ====
A-Side

1. "Wishing on a Star (D Influence Remix)"
2. "Wishing on a Star (Radio Edit)"

B-Side

1. "Wishing on a Star (Trackmasters Remix)"
2. "Imaginary Players"
3. "Wishing on a Star (Trackmasters Acappella)"

=== Charts ===
Chart (1998)	Peak position
Europe (Eurochart Hot 100)	48
Germany (Media Control Charts)	56
New Zealand (Recorded Music NZ)	29
Scotland (OCC)	55
Sweden (Sverigetopplistan)	50
UK Singles (OCC)	13
UK R&B (OCC)	5

== Beyoncé version ==
"Wishing on a Star"

Single by Beyoncé

from the album Roll Bounce: The Album
- B-side: "Naïve"
- Released: September 2005
- Length: 4:08
- Label: Columbia; Music World
- Songwriter: Billie Rae Calvin

Beyoncé singles chronology
"The Closer I Get to You" (2004)	"Wishing on a Star" (2005)	"Check on It" (2005)

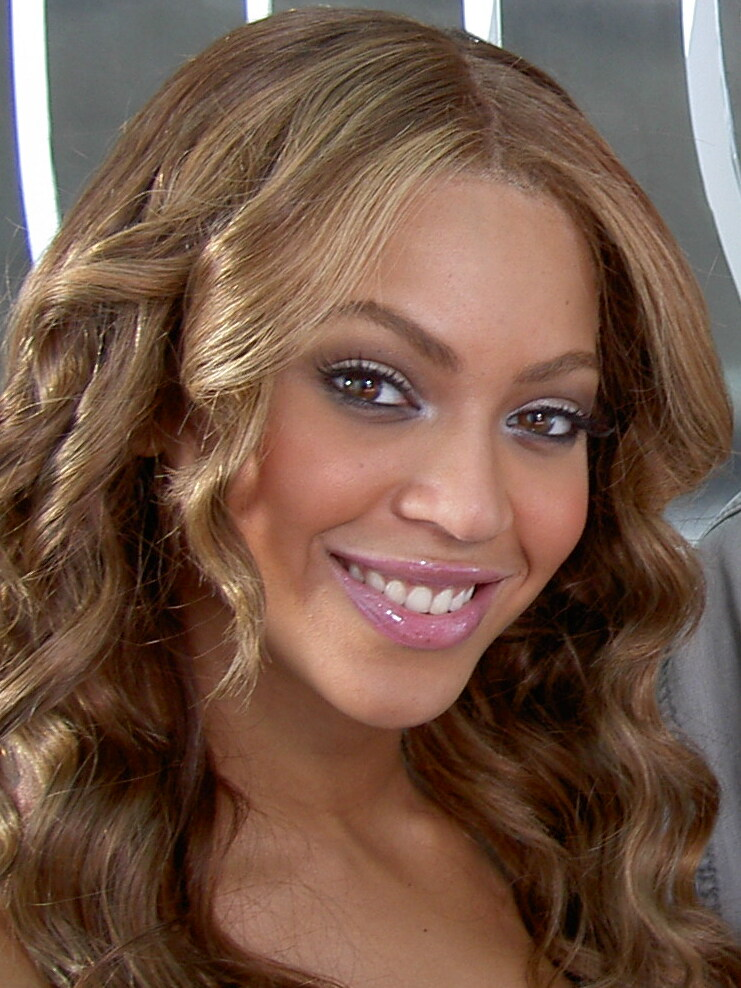
Beyoncé, 2004

"Wishing on a Star" was covered by American singer Beyoncé for the CD part of her live album Live at Wembley (2004). A writer for AllMusic described Beyoncé's cover as "sexy". The cover was also used to promote the fragrance True Star endorsed by American fashion designer Tommy Hilfiger in 2004. An a cappella version of the song was recorded by Beyoncé for its television campaign. An extended play (EP), titled True Star: A Private Performance and composed of two songs–"Wishing on a Star" and "Naïve", was released to promote the fragrance. Produced by Beyoncé and Hilfiger, it was solely available with limited edition purchases of True Star.

In 2005, "Wishing on a Star" was included on the soundtrack of the film Roll Bounce. It was later released for radio airplay as one of three singles from the soundtrack, becoming the second most-added single on urban adult contemporary radio following its release. The song peaked at number 28 on the US Adult R&B Songs chart. At the 48th Annual Grammy Awards (2006), the cover was nominated for Best Female R&B Vocal Performance. Six years after its original release, the song was made available for digital download on August 17, 2010.

=== Formats and track listings ===
- True Star: A Private Performance
1. "Wishing on a Star" – 4:07
2. "Naïve" – 3:45
- Digital download
1. "Wishing on a Star" – 4:08

=== Charts ===
Weekly chart performance for "Wishing on a Star"
Chart (2005)	Peak position
US Adult R&B Songs (Billboard)	28
US Bubbling Under R&B/Hip-Hop Singles (Billboard)	1

== Seal version ==
"Wishing on a Star"

Single by Seal

from the album Soul 2
- Released: November 8, 2011
- Length: 4:13
- Label: Reprise; Warner Bros.
- Songwriter: Billie Rae Calvin
- Producer: Trevor Horn

Seal singles chronology
"Let's Stay Together" (2011)	"Wishing on a Star" (2011)	"Every Time I'm with You" / "Do You Ever" (2015)

Licensed audio
- "Seal - Wishing On A Star [Audio]" on YouTube

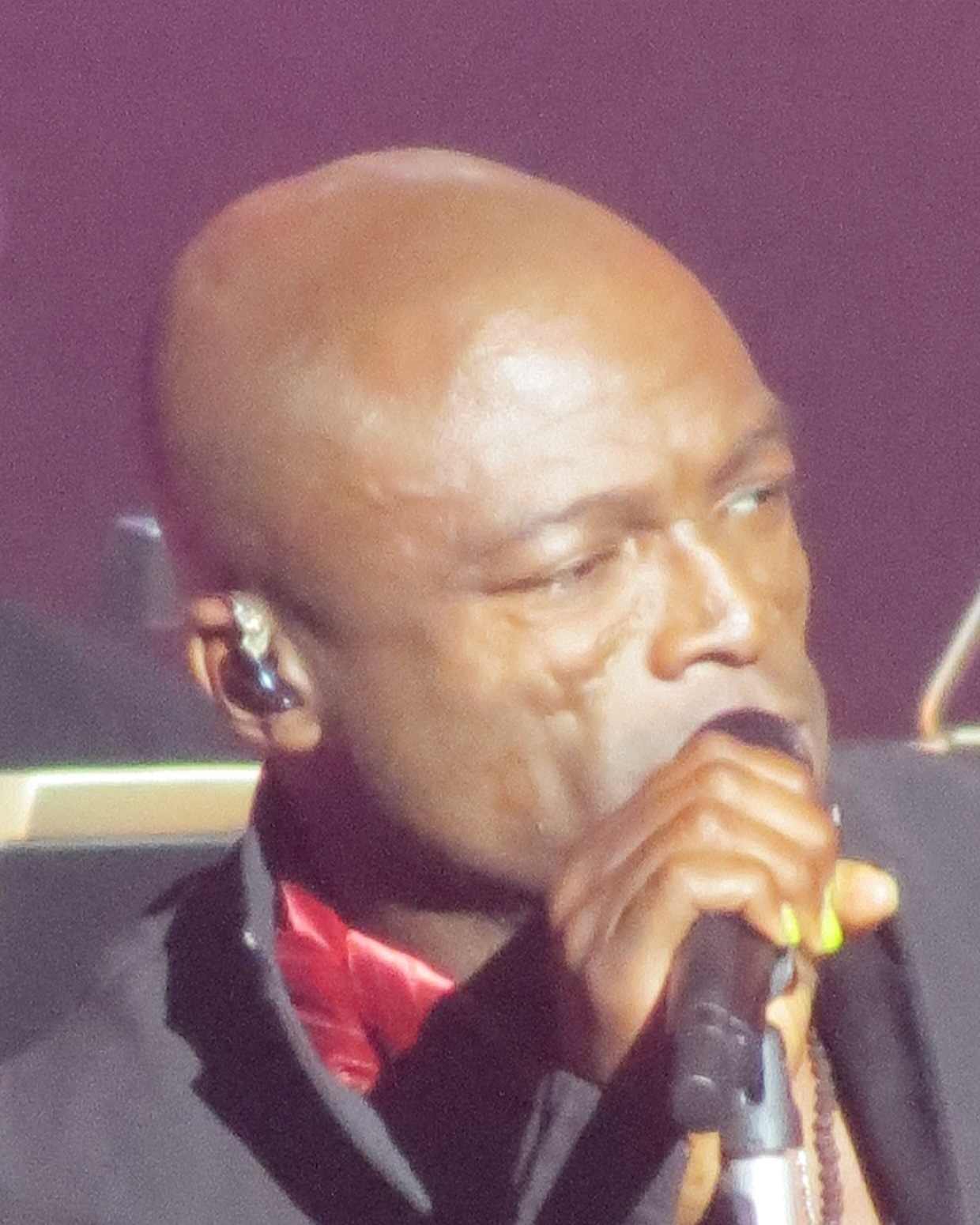
Seal, 2012

In 2011, "Wishing on a Star" was covered by Nigerian-British singer Seal. It was released as the first UK single taken from his album Soul 2 on November 20, 2011. This interpretation of "Wishing on a Star" was produced by previous collaborator, Trevor Horn.

Seal's version of the song premiered on Ken Bruce's BBC Radio 2 show on October 13, 2011. The single later peaked on the Radio 2 B-list.

=== Critical reception ===
In her review for Soul 2, Caroline Sullivan of The Guardian expressed, "His voice and interpretive skills are such, though, that most tracks fit him like a glove, to the point where, on Rose Royce's Wishing on a Star, his oak-aged vocal seems a better fit for the remorseful lyric than original singer Gwen Dickey's. He grew up with these 1970s hits, and evidently reveres them, but isn't cowed by them". In his review, Mike Diver of the BBC expressed that "Seal has a voice that can melt icecaps has never been doubted by his detractors – the problems with his material post-Seal (II) went deeper, to a basic songwriting level. Here, freed of the weight of his own emotions, he soars on a sublime Wishing on a Star (which manages to borrow its smoky backing from Sade's Smooth Operator).

=== Live performances ===
Seal performed "Wishing on a Star" on Daybreak on November 25, 2011.

=== Formats and track listings ===
Digital download

1. "Wishing on a Star" – 4:13

== The X Factor UK 2011 contestants version ==
"Wishing on a Star"

Single by The X Factor 2011 contestants featuring JLS and One Direction
- Released: November 27, 2011
- Recorded: Brighton, England; (Biffco Studios); London, England; (Metropolis Studios and Rokstone Studios)
- Length: 3:23
- Label: Syco; Sony
- Songwriter: Billie Rae Calvin
- Producers: Richard "Biff" Stannard; Ash Howes; Steve Mac

JLS singles chronology
"Take a Chance on Me" (2011)	"Wishing on a Star" (2011)	"Do You Feel What I Feel?" (2011)

One Direction singles chronology
"Gotta Be You" (2011)	"Wishing on a Star" (2011)	"One Thing" (2012)

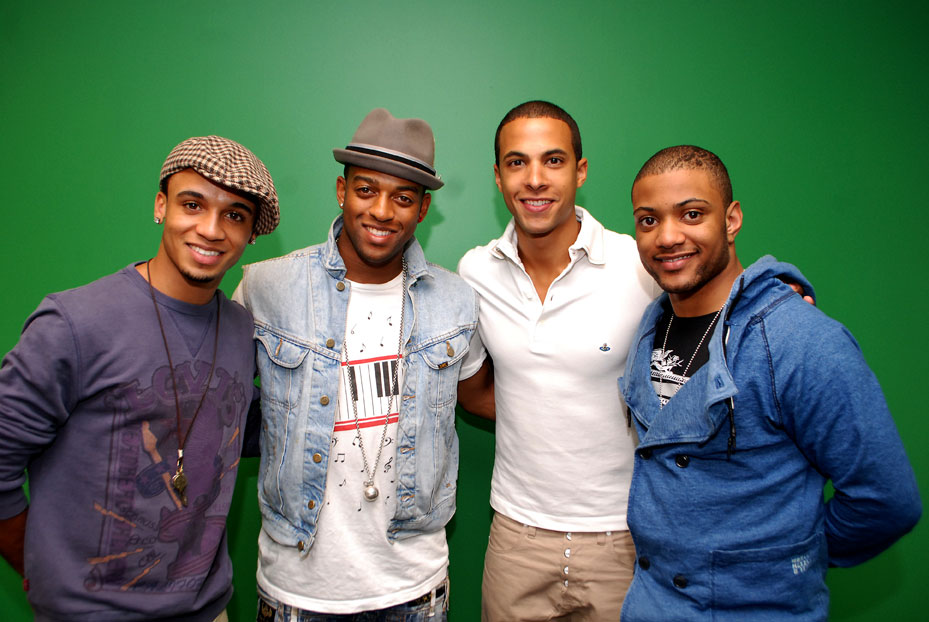
JLS, 2010

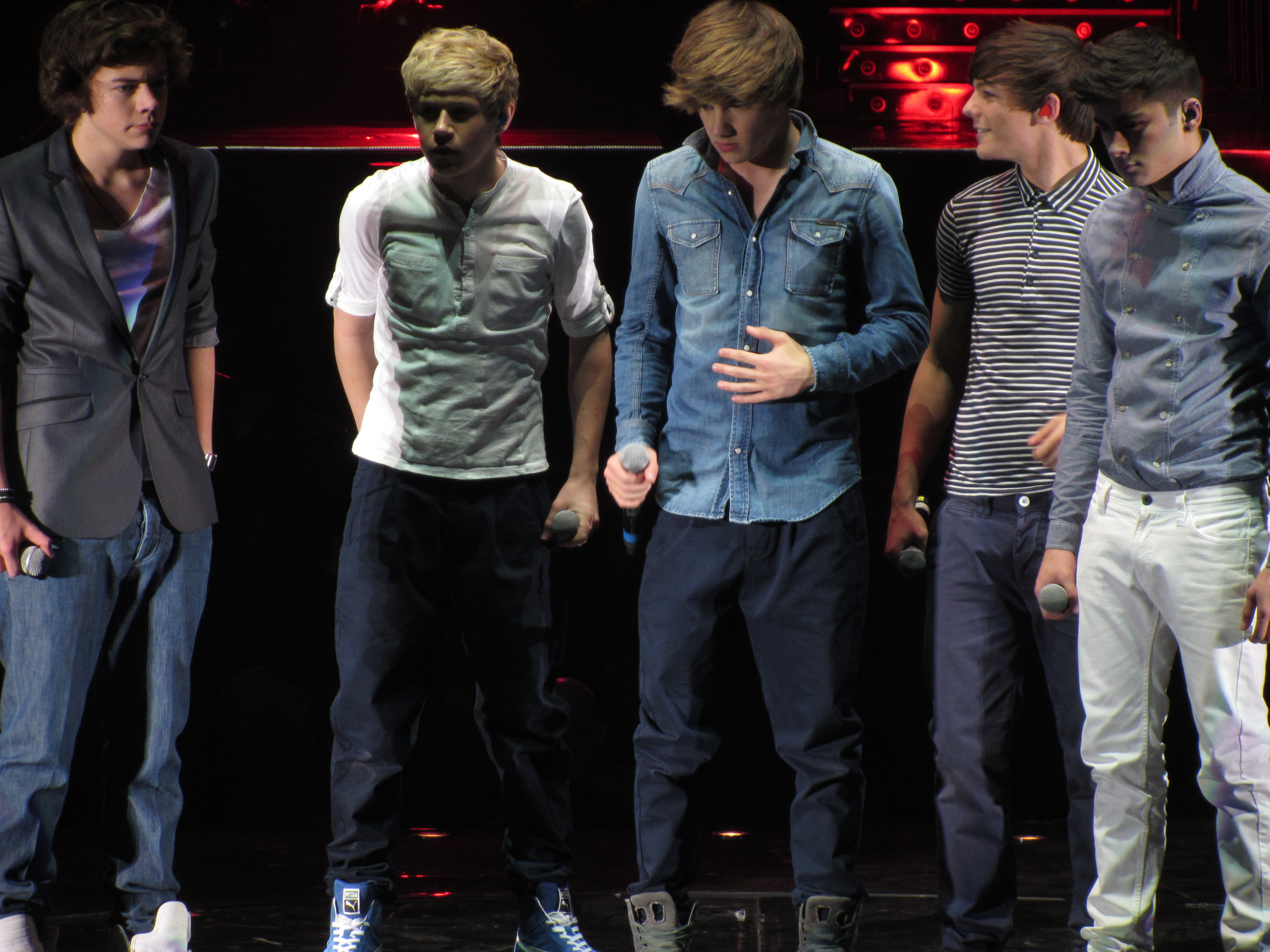
One Direction, 2011

Wishing on a Star was covered by the top 16 contestants of the eighth series of The X Factor, also featuring previous boyband contestants JLS and One Direction. The cover was released on November 27, 2011, via digital download, and released as a physical single the following day. All proceeds from the single went to the children's charity organization Together for Short Lives. The song debuted at number one on the UK Singles Chart with first-week sales of 98,932 copies.

=== Track listing ===
1. "Wishing on a Star" – 3:23
2. "Wishing on a Star (Instrumental)" – 3:23

=== Charts ===
Chart (2011)	Peak position
Euro Digital Song Sales (Billboard)	5
Ireland (IRMA)	1
Scottish Singles Sales (Official Charts)	1
UK Singles (Official Charts)	1
UK Airplay (Music Week)	25

=== Year-end charts ===
Chart (2011)	Position
UK Singles (OCC)	132

=== Release history ===
Region	Date	Format	Label
United Kingdom	November 27, 2011	Digital download	Syco Music; Sony Music
United Kingdom	November 28, 2011	CD single	Syco Music; Sony Music

== Other cover versions and uses ==
- Fresh 4 (Children of the Ghetto) ft. Lizz.E, a trip hop version reaching #10 on the UK singles chart in October 1989
- 88.3 ft. Lisa May in 1995, No. 61 UK hit.
- The song was covered by Anne Dudley as the theme song for the miniseries The 10th Kingdom in 2000.
- In 2004, Paul Weller's version rose to number 11 on the UK charts.
- 21 Savage used a sample of the original 1977 version for his hit "All of Me", released on his 2024 album American Dream, and used earlier in the trailer for his debut film, American Dream: The 21 Savage Story.
- Larry June used a sample of Wishing on a Star in his 2019 breakout song, "Smoothies in 1991" off of his album "Out the Trunk.

== See also ==
- List of songs recorded by Jay-Z
