= Love Don't Live Here Anymore =

1978 single by Rose Royce

- Dutch single picture sleeve

Single by Rose Royce

from the album Strikes Again
- B-side: "Do It, Do It"
- Released: November 11, 1978
- Recorded: 1978
- Genre: Soul
- Length: 3:56
- Label: Whitfield
- Songwriter: Miles Gregory
- Producer: Norman Whitfield

Rose Royce singles chronology
"I'm in Love (And I Love the Feeling)" (1978)	"Love Don't Live Here Anymore" (1978)	"First Come, First Serve" (1979)

"Love Don't Live Here Anymore" is a song written by Miles Gregory and originally recorded by American soul and R&B group Rose Royce. It was produced by former Motown songwriter and producer Norman Whitfield for Whitfield Records. Lead vocals were sung by Gwen Dickey and the song was released as the second single from their third studio album Strikes Again. The song was developed as a result of producer Whitfield's interest to work with Paul Buckmaster, the British arranger and composer. Together they asked songwriter Miles Gregory to write a song for them. Gregory's undergoing medical care for his deteriorating physical health became the inspiration behind the song. "Love Don't Live Here Anymore" incorporated the use of the Pollard Syndrum TwinDrum, and was one of the first songs to effectively use the sound reverbs of the instrument. The song was mainly recorded at music contractor Gene Bianco's house, where Dickey was present during the recording.

After its release, the song was critically appreciated, but was only moderately successful commercially. It reached a peak of 32 on the Billboard Hot 100 and five on the Hot Black Singles chart. It achieved its highest position in both New Zealand and the United Kingdom, where it reached number two. "Love Don't Live Here Anymore" has been covered by a number of artists, including Madonna, Morrissey–Mullen, Billy Idol, Jimmy Nail, and Faith Evans. Madonna's version was included in her second studio album Like a Virgin (1984), and it was the idea of Michael Ostin, the head of the A&R department of Warner Bros. Records, that Madonna record a cover version of the song to include in the album. A remix of Madonna's cover was included in her 1995 ballad compilation album Something to Remember.

The original and the remixed version of the Madonna song differ in that the latter uses more classical instruments. The 1995 version also received a number of club remix treatments. However, it was a commercial disappointment, reaching a peak of only 78 on the Billboard Hot 100. It was promoted by a music video shot by Jean-Baptiste Mondino, which portrayed Madonna in an empty suite of an abandoned hotel, and was shot in a single take.

== Background and music ==
Producer Norman Whitfield had always wanted to work with Paul Buckmaster, the British arranger and composer. One day he called Buckmaster and invited him to work on some recordings he had finished. After meeting, they decided to contact songwriter Miles Gregory to use one of his songs for Whitfield's record group Rose Royce. Buckmaster found that Gregory was under medication from overuse of drugs and "was in considerable discomfort, if not in outright pain. He didn't write a song and dance about his pain, but I remember him sitting at the piano and wincing. So before jumping on the thing that Miles was merely indulging himself and writing, one has to remember that the guy was in a lot of pain." Nevertheless, Whitfield and Buckmaster encouraged Gregory to write the song and the result was "Love Don't Live Here Anymore", inspired by Gregory's own situation and his deteriorating physical health.

"Love Don't Live Here Anymore" incorporated the use of the Pollard Syndrum, and was one of the first songs to effectively use the sound reverbs of the instrument. The Syndrum had been used sparingly in their previous single "Do Your Dance", but in "Love Don't Live Here Anymore" its use was more spontaneous, which Dave Thompson, author of Funk noted as if "it virtually duetted with Dickey, creating one of the most distinctive records of the year—and one of the most imitated of the age." The song was mainly recorded at music contractor Gene Bianco's house, where Rose Royce lead singer Gwen Dickey was present during the recording. Buckmaster recalled: "I was over at [Gene's] place almost every day with Norman, and some days I stayed away to write, or to mix the music. Gene had given me the keys to his apartment, and also let me use the piano to record the song. I didn't want to work on at Miles' because his piano was falling to bits."

== Reception ==
Kenny Hill from The San Diego Union-Tribune said that the song "was a lasting impression of Rose Royce's brilliance as a group" and it proved that disco and R&B soul music was not dead." Frederick Douglas from The Baltimore Sun complimented the song saying that "with their soul ballad 'Love Don't Live Here Anymore', Rose Royce is poised to take their place in the musical landscape as the greatest soul group." Bob Kostanczuk from Post-Tribune listed "Love Don't Live Here Anymore" as Rose Royce's greatest song. Jim Mortimer from Deseret News felt that "Love Don't Live Here Anymore" was a perfect example of how gospel and soul music can be clubbed together and complimented producer Buckmaster. Shannon Kingly from Los Angeles Daily News felt that "Love Don't Live Here Anymore" is "a tad bit overrated, and is full of shouting."

== Chart performance ==
"Love Don't Live Here Anymore" debuted at 91 on the Billboard Hot 100, and made a slow climb, ultimately reaching a peak of 32. It was more successful on the Hot Black Singles chart, where it reached five, and stayed there for four weeks. In Canada, the song debuted at 100 on the RPM Singles Chart on December 23, 1978. The song began a slow climb, and after nine weeks reached a peak of 41 on the chart. It was present for a total of 12 weeks on the chart. In the United Kingdom, "Love Don't Live Here Anymore" became Rose Royce's biggest hit, reaching number two on the UK Singles Chart while in Ireland it reached a peak of number seven. Across Europe, the song failed to chart except in the Netherlands, where it reached number eleven. The song was also successful in Australia and New Zealand.

== Track listing ==
- 7-inch single
1. "Love Don't Live Here Anymore" – 3:56
2. "Do It, Do It" – 4:09

== Credits and personnel ==
- Gwen Dickey – lead vocals
- Norman Whitfield – production, acoustic guitar
- Paul Buckmaster – production, piano, bass drum, Pollard Syndrum
- Miles Gregory – writing
- Rose Royce – background vocals

== Charts ==
=== Weekly charts ===
Chart (1978)	Peak position
Australia (Kent Music Report)	10
Belgium (Ultratop 50 Flanders)	18
Canada Top Singles (RPM)	41
Ireland (IRMA)	7
Netherlands (Dutch Top 40)	10
Netherlands (Single Top 100)	11
New Zealand (Recorded Music NZ)	2
UK Singles (Official Charts)	2
US Billboard Hot 100	32
US Hot R&B/Hip-Hop Songs (Billboard)	5

=== Year-end charts ===
Chart (1979)	Position
Australia (Kent Music Report)	55

== Certifications ==
Region	Certification	Certified units/sales
United Kingdom (BPI)	Gold	500,000^{^}
^{^} Shipments figures based on certification alone.

== Jimmy Nail version ==
"Love Don't Live Here Anymore"

Single by Jimmy Nail

from the album Take It or Leave It
- B-side: "Night for Day"
- Released: April 1, 1985
- Length: 3:57
- Label: Virgin
- Songwriter: Miles Gregory
- Producers: David Richards; Roger Taylor

Jimmy Nail singles chronology
"Love Don't Live Here Anymore" (1985)	"That's the Way Love Is" (1986)

English actor Jimmy Nail released a cover of the song in 1985 as his debut single, and on his first album Take It or Leave It. The song was produced by David Richards and Queen drummer Roger Taylor, who also played drums on the track, along with Rick Parfitt of Status Quo on lead guitar. It was a hit in the UK where it peaked at number 3 on the UK Singles Chart.

=== Track listings ===
7-inch (VS 764)

1. "Love Don't Live Here Anymore" – 3:57
2. "Night for Day" – 3:45

12-inch (VS 764-12)

1. "Love Don't Live Here Anymore" (extended version) – 6:38
2. "Night for Day" – 3:45

=== Personnel ===
- Jimmy Nail – vocals
- Roger Taylor – drums, synthesisers, arrangement, co-producer
- Rick Parfitt – lead guitar
- Jo Burt – bass guitar
- David Richards – co-producer, engineer
- Jill Furmanovsky – photography

=== Charts ===
Chart (1985)	Peak position
Ireland (IRMA)	5
Netherlands (Dutch Top 40)	32
Netherlands (Single Top 100)	28
UK Singles (Official Charts)	3

== I'm Talking version ==
"Love Don't Live Here Anymore"

Single by I'm Talking
- B-side: "Cry Me a River"
- Released: August 26, 1985
- Studio: AAV (Melbourne, Australia)
- Genre: Pop rock, synth-pop
- Length: 4:29
- Label: Regular
- Songwriter: Miles Gregory
- Producers: I'm Talking, Ross Cockle

I'm Talking singles chronology
"Lead the Way" (1985)	"Love Don't Live Here Anymore" (1985)	"Do You Wanna Be?" (1986)

Australian band I'm Talking covered the song, whose production was handled by the band alongside Ross Cockle. It was first available as the B-side on the 12-inch single "Lead the Way", before being released by Regular Records as a standalone single on August 26, 1985. The song peaked at number 21 on the Australian Kent Music Report chart.

=== Track listing ===
7-inch single (K 9817)

1. "Love Don't Live Here Anymore"
2. "Cry Me a River"

=== Charts ===
Chart (1985)	Peak position
Australia (Kent Music Report)	21

== Madonna version ==
"Love Don't Live Here Anymore"

Song by Madonna

from the album Like a Virgin
- Released: November 12, 1984
- Studio: Power Station (Manhattan)
- Genre: Pop
- Length: 4:47
- Label: Sire, Warner Bros.
- Songwriter: Miles Gregory
- Producer: Nile Rodgers

Music video
- Audio on YouTube

"Love Don't Live Here Anymore"

Single by Madonna

from the album Something to Remember
- Released: March 19, 1996
- Studio: Power Station (Manhattan)
- Genre: Pop
- Length: 4:54
- Label: Maverick, Warner Bros.
- Songwriter: Miles Gregory
- Producers: Nile Rodgers; David Reitzas

Madonna singles chronology
"One More Chance" (1996)	"Love Don't Live Here Anymore" (1996)	"You Must Love Me" (1996)

Music video
- Music video on YouTube

=== Background ===
Madonna had originally covered "Love Don't Live Here Anymore" for her second studio album, Like a Virgin (1984). The idea to cover the song originated from Michael Ostin, the head of the A&R department of Warner Bros. Records. In author Warren Zanes book Revolutions in Sound: Warner Bros. Records, the First 50 Years, he recalled:

"I had the good fortune of finding material that Madonna really responded to, 'Love Don't Live Here Anymore' for instance, which was the old Rose Royce record. I was driving into work one day and heard it on the radio, I called producer Nile Rodgers and Madonna, they were in the studio. I said, 'I have an idea,. You know the old Rose Royce record, 'Love Don't Live Here Anymore'? Why don't you try and record a version of it for Like a Virgin?"

Initially both Rodgers and Madonna were apprehensive of tackling an already well-known ballad, but in the last minute they decided that if Madonna wanted to bring diversity to the album, there could be no better song than "Love Don't Live Here Anymore". According to Rodgers, although Like a Virgin was mainly driven by Madonna, he was instrumental in adding "Love Don't Live Here Anymore" to the track list. The song was a favorite of Madonna.

Initially, the song was released as a single in 1986, exclusively in Japan. In 1995, Madonna released the ballad compilation album Something to Remember, with a slightly remixed version of the song by David Reitzas. For its release as a single in 1996, the song was completely reworked in a remix produced by Soulshock and Karlin, and was released as the second single from the album in North America and the third single in Europe and Australia, and was also used for the music video. The 1996 single mix has never been reissued anywhere else outside of this single. The original 1984 release was included in the 1996 Japanese box set CD Single Collection on 3" CD single and includes the track listing from the 1986 7-inch Japanese vinyl version.

=== Composition ===
"Love Don't Live Here Anymore"
The 1995 version has a slightly different melody than the 1984 version.

Madonna's version of the song begins with the sound of acoustic guitars and synth strings. Madonna's voice sounds high-pitched, eluding the deeper resonance of the tune. After the first verse, Tony Thompson starts playing the drums, which moves along the rhythm of the song. Towards the end, Madonna sings the song like a soul singer and the song ends with a gasp of breath. The song was recorded at Power Station Studio in Manhattan, New York. Rodgers recalled: "Madonna had never performed with a live orchestra before. I was very much into doing everything live, so I just said, 'Madonna, you go out there and sing and we will follow you.' At first Madonna was hesitant, but the live setting ended up producing memorable results. She sang and she was overcome with emotions and she started crying, but I left it on the record."

The 1995 remix on Something to Remember begins with the sound of violins and Uilleann pipes, followed by Madonna beginning the first verse. As the song progresses, the sound of the violin fades in and the drum machine starts, and the piano is played along with it. As the chorus is sung the third time, a bass drum is also added in the flow. The violin again fades in as Madonna sings "Through the windmills of my eye, Everyone can see the loneliness inside me." Near the end, she utters the chorus a number of times, emphasizing on the word "anymore" and the phrase "live here anymore". It ends with the Uilleann pipes fading out. The song was also treated with remixes which were released on promotional 12-inch and CD singles on May 6, 1996. SoulShock & Karlin provided an R&B styled remix while Marcus Schulz created a house remix which paired Madonna's voice with an energetic beat, coupled with vibrant organ lines and blipping synth effects.

=== Critical response ===
Author Rikky Rooksby wrote in his book The Complete Guide to the Music of Madonna that Madonna's singing in the song "deserved a commendation for bravery and was a sign that she was going to set herself challenges". Stephen Thomas Erlewine from AllMusic, while reviewing Like a Virgin, wrote that the cover of the song was "well worth hearing". Debbie Bull from Rolling Stone, meanwhile, opined that "her torchy ballad 'Love Don't Live Here Anymore' is awful". Larry Flick from Billboard complimented both the versions of the song, calling the first version "a lush slice of symphonic pop", and the other an "old-school, jeep-soul cruiser. Both arrangements perfectly suit her vocal, which is rife with emotional belts and theatrical gasps. [...] David Reitzas string-laden version will please those who never got enough of the previous single 'You'll See'. The bottom line is that this will likely be another smash for an artist whose stock as a credible musical entity deservedly rises with each release". He also complimented the dance remixes of the song, saying that "when combined, [Marcus Schultz house remix] keyboard lines add up to a very pastel, tea-dance ready twirler. His five mixes lean largely towards the middle of the club road". Damien Mendis from Music Week's RM Dance Update rated the song four out of five.

Liz Smith, while reviewing the Something to Remember album in Newsday, felt that all of Madonna's vocal trainings that she received while shooting for the film Evita, had "paid off, because the La M's second single sounds wonderful, and is a step up from the previous haunting 'You'll See'". Dorothy Holmes from Telegram & Gazette said that "'Love Don't Live Here Anymore' sounds like her perfect adult contemporary staple". Slant Magazine's Paul Schrodt wrote it was "among Madonna’s more faithful covers [...] shed to the limits of her vocal range, she wisely relies on a tearful, angsty rock delivery as the track builds and the strings undulate, until she’s literally panting for breath". Writing for The Baltimore Sun, J.D. Considine highlighted Madonna's "soulful intensity" on the song. From the Dallas Observer, Hunter Hauk deemed it "one of those Madonna ballads that, when you really examine it, is sung quite terribly. But it still works". Dennis Hunt from the Los Angeles Times opined that "someone with such a flimsy voice shouldn't be singing a sensitive ballad like 'Love Don't Live Here Anymore'". Entertainment Weekly's Chuck Arnold noted that "her best [cover] came early on with her soul-deep take on this Rose Royce ballad". Medium's Richard LaBeau pointed out that it was one of Madonna's "rare but intriguing and largely successful foray into remakes".

=== Chart performance ===
In the United States, "Love Don't Live Here Anymore" debuted at the top of the Bubbling Under Hot 100 Singles. After two weeks, it entered at 91 on the Billboard Hot 100, becoming Madonna's 36th entry on the chart, and her first entry with a remake of someone else's single. The song ultimately reached only a peak of 78, and was present for eight weeks on the chart. On June 8, 1996, the song was one of the breakout tracks for the Hot Dance Music/Club Play chart. It debuted at 39 on the chart and reached 30 the next week, becoming the Power Pick song of the chart. It ultimately reached a peak of 16 on the chart. It debuted on the Hot Adult Contemporary Chart at 30, and reached a peak of 29, the next week. On the Radio & Records Pop chart, it peaked at number 44. In Canada, the song debuted at number 99 on the RPM Singles Chart, on May 6, 1996. After eight weeks, the song reached a peak of 24 on the chart. It was present on the chart for 12 weeks. Across Europe, the song charted in France at 48, and also reached 27 in Australia.

In the United Kingdom, "Love Don't Live Here Anymore" did not enter the official UK Top 100 chart, however, after the single's digital re-release in 2023, the song debuted and peaked at number 61 on the official Singles Downloads Chart.

=== Music video and live performance ===
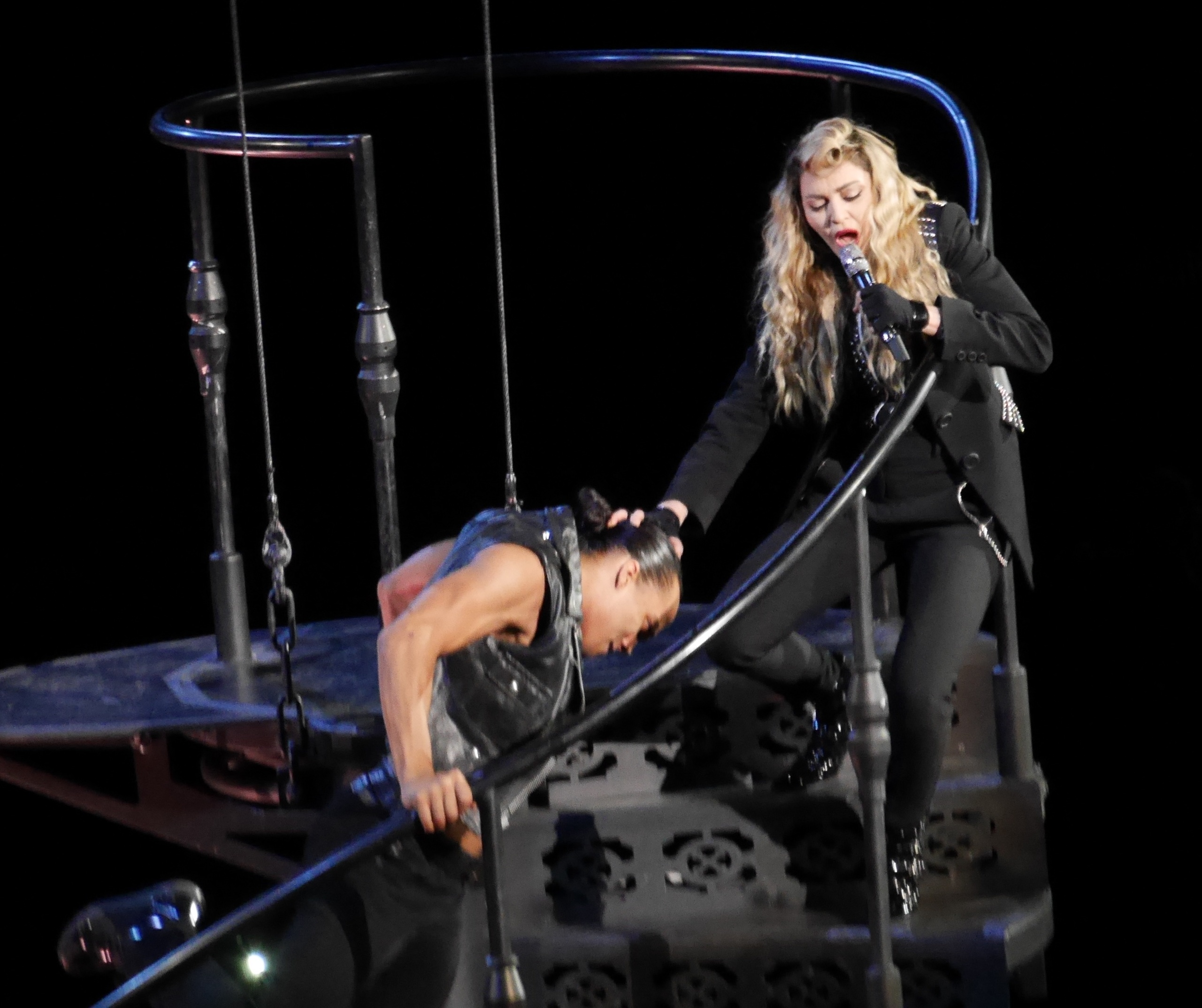
Madonna performing the mashup of "HeartBreakCity" and "Love Don't Live Here Anymore" during the Rebel Heart Tour (2015–16)

The music video which makes use of the Soulpower Remix was directed by Jean-Baptiste Mondino who worked with Madonna in her videos for "Open Your Heart", "Justify My Love" and "Human Nature" and shot on March 4, 1996, at the Confitería del Molino in Buenos Aires, Argentina, on a day off from filming Evita. Maria Gallagher was the producer, with Jean-Yves Escoffier serving as director of photography. It was a Bandits Production. In her Evita diaries, published by Vanity Fair magazine in 1996, Madonna made reference to the video shoot. In her writings, she specifically mentioned forgetting the lyrics of the song, suggesting she was having an identity crisis of sorts, trying to juggle her own identity with that of her role of Eva Perón in Evita. Madonna was also in the early stages of her pregnancy with daughter Lourdes while making the video. Hence, she felt great stress while shooting it, which led her to forget the lyrics.

The video features Madonna at the empty suite of an abandoned hotel, a similar setting to her "Like a Virgin" music video. It was shot in a single frame, with the camera approaching Madonna, as she stands behind a pillar. She rotates around it and sings the song, as air blows through the room. The video ends with Madonna looking up towards the camera the last time, and then closing her eyes. It was treated with sepia color. Carol Vernallis, author of Experiencing music video: aesthetics and cultural context felt that the video was a good example of how image can direct the viewer's attention towards the shift in instrumentation and arrangement of the song. She noted the aimless movement of the camera towards her as "bringing focus to the main subject, with the viewer's attention fully captured."

A mashup of "HeartBreakCity", a track from her 13th studio album Rebel Heart, and "Love Don't Live Here Anymore" was performed on Madonna's 2015–16 Rebel Heart Tour. It began with the singer dancing with a male back-up dancer as she sang "HeartBreakCity"; then, she chased him up a long spiral staircase and pushed him backwards before merging into "Love Don't Live Here Anymore". Erik Kabik from The Las Vegas Sun, praised the performance for its simplicity.

=== Formats and track listings ===
- Digital single (2023)
1. "Love Don't Live Here Anymore" (Album Remix Edit) – 4:03
2. "Love Don't Live Here Anymore" (Soulpower Radio Remix Edit) – 4:04
3. "Love Don't Live Here Anymore" (Hot Mix Radio Edit) – 4:50
4. "Love Don't Live Here Anymore" (Soulpower Radio Remix Version) – 4:45
5. "Love Don't Live Here Anymore" (Album Remix) – 4:55

=== Charts ===
==== Weekly charts ====
Chart (1996)	Peak position
Australia (ARIA)	27
Canada Top Singles (RPM)	24
Canada Adult Contemporary (RPM)	4
Canada Hit Parade (AC/CHR/Rock) (The Record)	31
Canada Contemporary Hit Radio (The Record)	22
Croatia (HR Top 40)	8
France (SNEP)	48
Netherlands (Dutch Top 40 Tipparade)	16
Netherlands (Dutch Single Tip)	14
UK Pop Tip Club Chart (Music Week)	2
US Billboard Hot 100	78
US Adult Contemporary (Billboard)	29
US Dance Club Songs (Billboard)	16
US Cash Box Top 100	63
US Pop (Radio and Records)	44

Chart (2023)	Peak position
UK Singles Downloads (Official Charts)	61

==== Year-end charts ====
Chart (1996)	Position
Canada Adult Contemporary (RPM)	48

== Other versions ==
An instrumental cover recorded by jazz-funk duo Morrissey–Mullen at EMI's London Abbey Road Studios in 1979 was EMI's first digital recording of a non-classical ensemble. A limited edition 12-inch single of the song was the first release of the EMI Digital series.

A reggae version by vocalist Sharon Forrester and arranged by Boris Gardiner was released in 1979. British dance music producers Double Trouble released their arrangement of "Love Don't Live Here Anymore" as a single in 1990, with vocals mixed over a house-influenced backing track. It reached No. 21 on the UK Singles Chart and No. 11 in New Zealand. A dancehall reggae version was released in 1997 by Bounty Killer with Swedish singer Robyn. Faith Evans' recording of the song appeared on her 1995 album Faith. Seal released a version in 2011 on his Soul 2 album. American hardcore punk band Lionheart's cover was the title track of their fourth and final album, released in 2016. Robyn Hitchcock also performed the song live at shows in 2004.

Billy Idol's cover of the song was originally intended for inclusion on the 1983 Rebel Yell album but was left unreleased until March 2024 and the 40th-anniversary reissue of the album.
