= Rose Royce =

American soul and R&B group

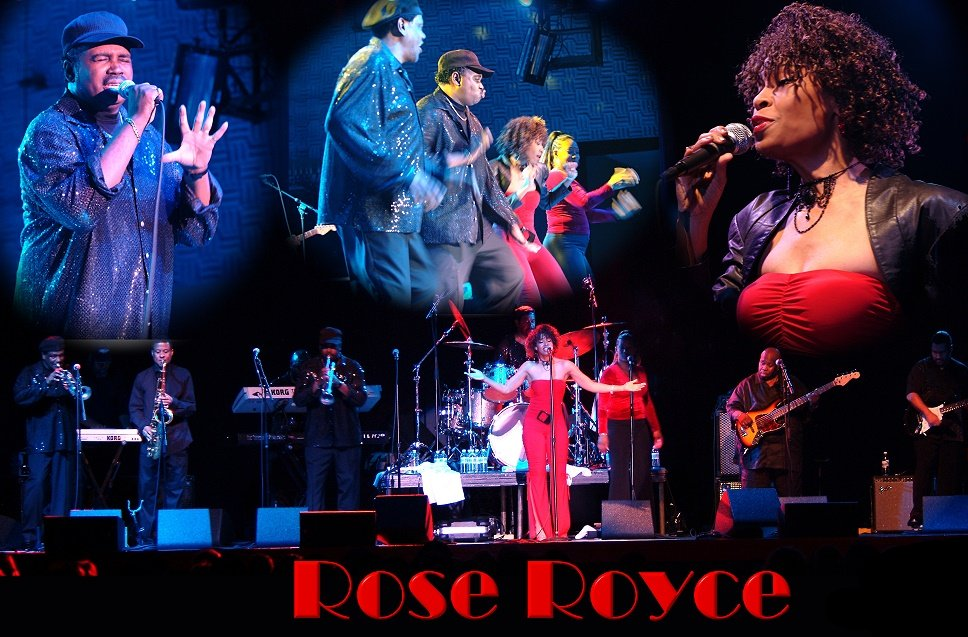
- Rose Royce performing in 2005

Background information
- Origin: Los Angeles, California, U.S.
- Genres: Soul, R&B, disco, funk
- Years active: 1973–present
- Labels: Whitfield, Epic, Streetwave, Omni
- Members: Kenny Copeland; Kenji Brown; Lequeint "Duke" Jobe; Victor Nix; Henry Garner; Freddie Dunn; Michael Moore; Terry Santiel; Michael Nash
- Past members: Gwen Dickey; Ricci Benson; Lisa Taylor

Rose Royce is an American soul and R&B group. They are best known for several hit singles during the 1970s including "Car Wash", "I Wanna Get Next to You", "I'm Going Down", "Wishing on a Star", and "Love Don't Live Here Anymore".

== Career ==
The Los Angeles-based group was composed of Gwen Dickey (vocals), Henry Garner (drums), Terral "Terry" Santiel (congas), Lequeint "Duke" Jobe (bass), Michael Moore (saxophone), Kenny Copeland (trumpet, lead vocals), Kenji Brown (guitar, lead vocals), Freddie Dunn (trumpet), and Victor Nix (keyboards). The group began in the early 1970s when members of several backup bands from the Watts and Inglewood areas of Los Angeles united under the name Total Concept Unlimited. In 1973, this collective toured England and Japan behind Motown soul star Edwin Starr. Starr introduced them to Norman Whitfield.

Whitfield, after a decade at Motown, wanted to start a company of his own. He took the T.C.U. octet under his wing and signed them to his label. The group, now called Magic Wand, began working with Yvonne Fair and became the studio and concert band for the Undisputed Truth. During a tour stop in Miami, Undisputed Truth leader Joe Harris noticed a singer named Gwen Dickey, then a member of a local group called the Jewels. Harris informed Whitfield of his discovery and Dickey was flown to Los Angeles to audition. Whitfield asked Gwen to join the band, and gave her the stage name of Rose Norwalt. This was the lineup for the band's debut album.

During this time, Whitfield was contacted by film director Michael Schultz, fresh from the success of his first feature, Cooley High. Schultz offered Whitfield the opportunity to score his next picture, Car Wash. Whitfield would use the film to launch his new group and began composing music based on script outlines. He and the band visited the film set, soaking up the atmosphere. The band composed the music concurrently with the picture instead of after the fact, which was not very common at the time. In the spirit of the soundtrack, the band's name was changed one final time to 'Rose Royce'. The name not only referenced the movie's automotive theme (as the group's name closely resembled Rolls-Royce luxury cars), but just as Rolls-Royce cars are premier vehicles, the group was metaphorically stating they were a premier group. The name also helped place Gwen "Rose" Dickey somewhat front and center.

The movie Car Wash and the soundtrack were great successes, bringing the group national fame. Whitfield won the Best Music award at the Cannes Film Festival, and the album received the Grammy for Best Motion Picture Score Album of the Year. Released in late 1976, the soundtrack featured three Billboard R&B top ten singles: "Car Wash", "I Wanna Get Next to You", and "I'm Going Down". The first of these was also a number one single on the Billboard popular music chart, and "I Wanna Get Next to You" reached number 10. Rose Royce also played instruments behind the Pointer Sisters singing "You Gotta Believe" in the film. June Pointer remembers Whitfield pushing Dickey to sing better at the rehearsals, saying "Why can't you sing like the Pointer Sisters?"

The group's follow-up album, Rose Royce II: In Full Bloom, produced two top ten singles, "Do Your Dance" and "Ooh Boy". It also included "Wishing on a Star", which for Rose Royce was a top-10 hit only in the UK; it became notable elsewhere through its cover versions, including the Cover Girls' top ten single in 1992.

In 1978, they released their third album, entitled Rose Royce III: Strikes Again!, and it featured "I'm in Love (And I Love the Feeling)" and "Love Don't Live Here Anymore". Both singles entered the Billboard R&B top five. "Love Don't Live Here Anymore" was a number 2 hit in the UK Singles Chart, and would later gain greater exposure through its cover versions, most notably by Madonna in 1984 and 1995.

The single "Is It Love You're After?" was released in 1979, taken from the album Rainbow Connection IV, the last album with lead singer Gwen Dickey before she left to embark on a solo career. It was the band's fourth highest-charting single in the UK.

The group followed with a series of modest successes that reached the charts but never gained the status that their previous songs did. Dickey left the group in April 1980 and Rose Royce temporarily disbanded. However, the remaining members regrouped, adjusted the line-up, and kept the group somewhat popular in the UK, where they remained a marquee attraction.

Singer Ricci Benson replaced Dickey, taking over lead female vocals between the 1980 album "Golden Touch" and the 1986 album "Fresh Cut". Lisa Taylor then replaced Benson for the 1989 album "Perfect Lover".

Rose Royce was featured in TV One's seasonal series, Unsung during the spring of 2010. The story featured the successes and internal bickering of the group. Dickey, Copeland, Jobe, Moore and Garner were the only members of the band who gave interviews throughout the program. Dickey now performs as a solo artist in the UK but mentioned during the interview that she would not mind performing with the group once again. From 2012 to 2013, R&B vocalist Debelah Morgan joined the band as their lead singer for a few shows. Additionally, Bag Raiders and Daft Punk sampled their single "First Come, First Serve" with the songs "Shooting Stars" and "Too Long" respectively.

Gwen Dickey formed her own version of Rose Royce - Gwen Dickey's Rose Royce and in 2021 and 2022 toured the UK nationally. In 2022 Gwen featured on the Giants of Soul Tour - taking in 15 UK venues performing with Deniece Williams, Alexander O'Neal, Tunde (Lighthouse Family) and Jaki Graham. In 2023, Gwen Dickey's Rose Royce headlined at The London Palladium

== Discography ==
- Car Wash (1976)
- In Full Bloom (1977)
- Strikes Again (1978)
- Rainbow Connection IV (1979)
- Greatest Hits (1980)
- Golden Touch (1980)
- Jump Street (1981)
- Stronger Than Ever (1982)
- Music Magic (1984)
- The Show Must Go On (1985) (unreleased) (Note: The Show Must Go On appears to be an unreleased album recorded near the end of the group's association with Streetwave Records in the mid-1980s; apart from the single "Love Me Right Now" (which lists The Show Must Go On as its parent album), there seems to be no existing information about any songs from the album or an album cover.)
- Fresh Cut (1986)
- Perfect Lover (1989)
