= Angel Clivillés =

American singer

Angel Clivilles was the stage name used by Louise Angel Sabater, later Angel Mercado, a Latina dance music singer of Puerto Rican descent She was born in the Bronx, New York, United States.

== Music career ==
Angel Mercado began her musical career in 1986, as a member of the freestyle girl group The Cover Girls. Mercado left The Cover Girls in 1990 to embark on a solo career. She toured as "Angel (The Original Cover Girl)" until 2012.

== Personal life ==
She is married to La' Entertainment founder and owner Latif Mercado, having divorced Carlos Clivillés, older brother of Robert of the group C + C Music Factory.

== Discography ==
=== Albums ===
- 2000: Angel

=== Singles ===
- 1998: "Toro Mata"
- 1999: "One More Chance"
- 2000: "Show Me" - U.S. Dance #1

== See also ==
- List of artists who reached number one on the US Dance chart
