= Fever Records =

American record label

- Industry: Music and Entertainment.
- Headquarters: New York City, New York, United States.
- Products: Long Plays, Tapes and Compact Discs.

Fever Records is a New York City record label of the 1980s, founded by promoter Sal Abbatiello.

The label was marketed and distributed by Sutra Records until the latter went under, which precipitated a distribution deal with Russell Simmons's RAL division of Def Jam Recordings.

Fever Records is best known for the recording artists The Cover Girls, Lissette Melendez and Lil Suzy. The releases distributed by Sutra are now controlled by Warlock Records/Traffic Entertainment group.

== See also ==
- List of record labels
