= Whitfield Records =

Defunct record label founded by producer Norman Whitfield

Whitfield Records was an American record label founded by Norman Whitfield.

== History ==
Whitfield Records was founded in 1975 by Norman Whitfield, a former Motown producer and songwriter. Music released by the record label was distributed by Warner Records.

The first act signed to the label was The Undisputed Truth. Other acts signed to Whitfield Records included Rose Royce (who later released the song "Car Wash"), Mammatapee, Willie Hutch, Yvonne Fair, Junior Walker, and Nytro.

The label ceased operations in 1982.

== Selected discography ==
1. 2967 - Method to the Madness - The Undisputed Truth [1976] (1/77)
2. 3019 - Nytro - Nytro [1977]
3. 3074 - In Full Bloom - Rose Royce [1977] (8/77)
4. 3124 - Music Web - Spyder Turner [1978]
5. 3171 - Mammatapee! - Mammatapee [1980]
6. 3202 - Smokin' - Undisputed Truth [1979]
7. 3226 - In Tune - Willie Hutch [1978] (11/78)
8. 3227 - Strikes Again - Rose Royce [1978] (9/78)
9. 3275 - Return to Nytropolis - Nytro [1979]
10. 3331 - Back Street Boogie - Junior Walker [1979]
11. 3352 - Midnight Dancer - Willie Hutch [1979]
12. 3387 - Rainbow Connection IV - Rose Royce [1979] (9/79)
13. 3389 - The Girl's Alright with Me - Masterpiece [1980]
14. 3397 - Only Love - Spyder Turner [1980]
15. 3457 - Greatest Hits - Rose Royce [1980]
16. 3510 - On the One - Mammatapee [1980]
17. 3512 - Golden Touch - Rose Royce [1981] (1/81)
18. 3620 - Jump Street - Rose Royce [1981]

== See also ==
- List of record labels
