= Shark Tale (soundtrack) =

2004 film soundtrack album

Shark Tale (Motion Picture Soundtrack)

Soundtrack album by Hans Zimmer
- Released: September 21, 2004
- Recorded: 2003–2004
- Genres: R&B; hip-hop; soul
- Length: 50:33
- Labels: Geffen; DreamWorks; UMG Soundtracks
- Producers: Timbaland; Jam & Lewis; Ron Fair; Missy Elliott; The Underdogs; Mr. Porter; Bitcrusher; Dre & Vidal; The Trak Starz; Hans Zimmer

Singles from Shark Tale (Motion Picture Soundtrack)
- 1. "Car Wash" Released: August 30, 2004

Shark Tale (Motion Picture Soundtrack) is the soundtrack album composed by Hans Zimmer for the film of the same name and released by DreamWorks Records, Geffen Records and UMG Soundtracks on September 21, 2004. The album also features newly recorded songs performed by an array of artists such as Christina Aguilera, Mary J. Blige, India.Arie, Sean Paul, Timbaland, and Bobby Valentino.

== Background ==
The soundtrack for Shark Tale featured newly recorded music from artists including Christina Aguilera, Mary J. Blige, India.Arie, Bobby Valentino, Sean Paul, Timbaland, D12, JoJo, The Pussycat Dolls, Ludacris, Missy Elliott, Avant, and Justin Timberlake. The closing theme "Some of My Best Friends Are Sharks", is composed by Hans Zimmer; the only score cue that is featured in the album.

Janet Jackson and Beyoncé initially planned to record a duet for the film's soundtrack. Jackson's frequent collaborator Jimmy Jam, who had recently worked with Beyoncé for The Fighting Temptations soundtrack, commented, "Obviously we'd love to have the involvement of Janet and Beyonce, who we just worked with on Fighting Temptations. They've already expressed interest", adding "There are a lot of opportunities with an animated piece to work with some different people." Jeffrey Katzenberg, CEO of DreamWorks Animation, had appointed Jackson's producers Jam & Lewis to be involved with the soundtrack, though the duo only ended up producing only one song for the film, with Jam saying "We worked for DreamWorks before on the Bryan Adams song for Spirit: Stallion of the Cimarron and the Boyz II Men tune for The Prince of Egypt, and Katzenberg is a fan of what we do. He thought we would be perfect to do the music for Shark Tale."

Christina Aguilera collaborated with rapper-singer Missy Elliott to record the cover of Rose Royce's 1976 disco song "Car Wash" for the soundtrack of the eponymous comedy film, which added a more modern and contemporary feel with rap verses from Elliott. Aguilera was reportedly paid $1 million to record the version, who said that "We had to change the key to be a little bit higher for my range. So we couldn't take the exact samples, but we brought in all these live instruments to recreate kind of this old, old classic, soulful feel and sound." The song was preceded as the lead single from the album on August 30, 2004. Ludacris and D12, who were usually known for songs with raunchy and expletive lyrics had performed "Gold Digger" and "Lies & Rumors" which did not have any expletives, as the film was aimed for a family-friendly audience, but also chose themes that would resonate with their core listeners.

== Streaming availability ==
As of 2025, the album is only partially available on streaming services. Seven of the 13 tracks are unavailable, including the lead single "Car Wash" performed by Missy Elliott and Christina Aguilera. In November 2025, Elliott joined a fan campaign to release "Car Wash" on streaming services. Elliott posted on X, tagging Universal Music Group and Geffen Records "@UMG @GeffenRecords the fans tagged me wanting to know why the song 'Car Wash' on #Sharktale soundtrack not on streaming sites... Can you please help out because many of them have been asking as you can see and miss it.". Entertainment news outlets such as Billboard and People, picked up the story, with Alex Cooper of Australian magazine Happy Mag calling "Car Wash" a "pop culture gem" and the soundtrack a "significant piece of early 2000s music history".

== Critical reception ==
Professional ratings
Review scores
Source	Rating
AllMusic	3/5 stars

Richie Unterberger of AllMusic wrote considered it to be "cheerful (sometimes to the point of silly), unmemorably ordinary commercial music from the middle of the 21st century's first decade, with more ballad-like numbers breaking up the generally beat-heavy atmosphere". Khepra Akanke of The Michigan Daily wrote "Overall, there are simply too many fish and shark references. The songs cannot be appreciated without viewing the movie. An 8 or 9 year old may find the Shark Tale Soundtrack entertaining for awhile, but only after they fall in love with the characters of the movie".

== Track listing ==
No.	Title	Writer(s)	Producer(s)	Length
1.	"Three Little Birds" (Sean Paul and Ziggy Marley)	Bob Marley	Stephen Marley	3:37
2.	"Car Wash (Shark Tale Mix)" (Christina Aguilera featuring Missy Elliott)	Norman Whitfield (additional lyrics by Missy Elliott)	Missy Elliott; Ron Fair	3:50
3.	"Good Foot" (Justin Timberlake and Timbaland)	Timberlake; Timothy Mosley	Timbaland	3:57
4.	"Secret Love" (JoJo)	Samantha Jade; Jared Gosselin; Phillip White	White; Jared	4:00
5.	"Lies & Rumors" (D12)	DeShaun Holton; J. Rotem; Denaun Porter; O. Moore; V. Carlisle; Rufus Johnson; M. Chavarria	Porter	4:20
6.	"Got to Be Real" (Mary J. Blige featuring Will Smith)	David Foster; David Paich; Cheryl Lynn	Andre Harris; Vidal Davis	3:33
7.	"Can't Wait" (Avant)	Damon E. Thomas; Antonio Dixon; Harvey W. Mason; Eric Dawkins; Steven Russell	The Underdogs	3:44
8.	"Gold Digger" (Ludacris featuring Bobby Valentino and Lil' Fate)	Alonzo Lee; Shamar Daugherty; Christopher Bridges; Bobby Wilson; Arbie Wilson	The Trak Starz	3:47
9.	"Get It Together" (India.Arie)	Drew Ramsey; Shannon Sanders; India Arie Simpson; Dana Johnson; Mel Johnson	India.Arie; Sanders; Ramsey	4:54
10.	"We Went as Far as We Felt Like Going" (The Pussycat Dolls)	Bob Crewe; Kenny Nolan	Ron Fair	3:51
11.	"Digits" (Fan 3)	Allison Lurie; Paul Robb; David Clayton-Thomas; Fred Lipsius	BitCrusher	3:41
12.	"Sweet Kind of Life" (Cheryl Lynn)	James Harris III; Terry Lewis; Cheryl Lynn; Bobby Ross Avila; Issiah J. Avila; Tony Tolbert; James Q. Wright	Jimmy Jam and Terry Lewis	3:59
13.	"Some of My Best Friends Are Sharks" (Hans Zimmer)	Hans Zimmer	Hans Zimmer	3:25
Total length:				50:33

== Chart performance ==
Chart (2004)	Peak position
Australian Albums (ARIA)	50
Austrian Albums (Ö3 Austria)	72
Canadian Albums (Billboard)	35
Danish Albums (Hitlisten)	64
French Albums (SNEP)	158
Swiss Albums (Schweizer Hitparade)	77
UK Compilation Albums (OCC)	7
US Billboard 200	31
US Top R&B/Hip-Hop Albums (Billboard)	48
US Top Soundtracks (Billboard)	1
