= It's Gonna Be Right =

Studio album by Cheryl Lynn
- Released: June 21, 1985
- Recorded: December 1984–March 1985
- Length: 43:07
- Label: Columbia
- Producer: Jimmy Jam and Terry Lewis; Cheryl Lynn; Monte Moir; Hubert Eaves III

Cheryl Lynn chronology
Preppie (1983)	It's Gonna Be Right (1985)	Start Over (1987)

Singles from It's Gonna Be Right
- 1. "Fidelity" Released: May 14, 1985; 2. "Fade to Black" Released: August 14, 1985

It's Gonna Be Right is a 1985 album by American singer Cheryl Lynn, released on Columbia Records. The album was a follow-up to her successful 1983 album, Preppie. The album was also Lynn's final album for the Columbia Label. It was produced by Jimmy Jam and Terry Lewis, who had produced her hit single "Encore".

The first single, "Fidelity", though bearing similarities to Cheryl Lynn's previous Jam & Lewis-produced smash "Encore," only reached #25 on the R&B charts, its lacklustre performance was widely blamed on its predecessor still being in heavy rotation at the time of its release. Cheryl Lynn, co-wrote and produced the follow-up single "Fade To Black" herself, but it only reached #85 on the R&B charts. The Jam & Lewis helmed title track bore several sonic similarities to her smash hit "Got To Be Real." Despite employing the popular production duo, the album only reached #56 on the R&B albums chart. The album was reissued in September 2010, as an import on Sony Records Japan, however no bonus material was included. In September, 2015 it was rereleased by PTG on CD including one bonus track, the long version of "Fidelity".

== Critical reception ==
Professional ratings
Review scores
Source	Rating
AllMusic	3/5 stars

AllMusic editor Ron Wynn rated the album three out of five stars. Referring to Lynn's departure from Columbia Records after the release of It's Gonna Be Right, he called the album "a fitting conclusion to a tenure that had some chart hits but never jelled the way everyone felt it would (or should). Lynn got two more good numbers from the final effort, including the Jam/Lewis number "Fidelity," but again, there weren't enough songs to make the album a big success, nor did it have a unified concept or strategy."

== Track listing ==
1. "Fidelity" - 4:50
2. "Fade to Black" - 6:32
3. "Love's Been Here Before" - 3:18
4. "It's Gonna Be Right" - 4:02
5. "Let Me Love You" - 5:50
6. "Find Somebody New" - 4:06
7. "Loafin'" - 5:14
8. "Slipped Me a Mickey" - 4:18
9. "Tug'O'War" - 4:57

== Charts ==
Weekly chart performance for It's Gonna Be Right
Chart (1985)	Peak position
US Top R&B/Hip-Hop Albums (Billboard)	56
