= Erik (British singer) =

Recording artist

Erica Harrold, known professionally as Erik, is a British singer. She began her career as a session singer for artists such as M People, Tom Jones, Swing Out Sister, Jason Donovan, Vic Reeves and Errol Brown. She was the featured vocalist in the 1991 dance single "Unity", by the group of the same name. It was a club hit and peaked at No. 64 on the UK Singles Chart. Under her original name, Erik also recorded vocals for the single "No More", by Unique 3, in 1991.

In 1993, she started her solo career. She signed to PWL Records and released the Mike Stock & Pete Waterman-produced single "Looks Like I'm in Love Again", which peaked at No. 46 on the UK chart. Her next single, "The Devil and the Deep Blue Sea", was never officially released. In 1994, she released a cover of the Cheryl Lynn classic "Got to Be Real", which became her biggest hit. Later that year, she released her last single, "We Got the Love", which peaked at No. 55, originally recorded by Lindy Layton.

In January 2010, an album titled Real, including her work recorded at PWL Studios during 1993-1994 was released through iTunes. It includes eight previously unreleased songs.

== Discography ==
=== Album ===
- Real (2010)

=== Singles ===
- "Unity" (as part of the group Unity) (1991) UK No. 64
- "No More" (as featured vocalist for the group Unique 3 (1991) UK No. 74
- "Looks Like I'm in Love Again" (as Key West featuring Erik) (1993) UK No. 46, UK No. 1 Club chart
- "The Devil and the Deep Blue Sea" (1993) (withdrawn)
- "Got to Be Real" (1994) UK No. 42
- "We Got the Love" (1994) UK No. 55
