= Shake It Up Tonight =

Single by Cheryl Lynn

from the album In the Night
- B-side: "Baby"
- Released: May 12, 1981
- Recorded: 1980
- Studio: Ameraycan Studios (Hollywood, California)
- Genre: R&B; post-disco
- Length: 5:41 (album version); 4:11 (single version)
- Label: Columbia
- Songwriter: Mike and Brenda Sutton
- Producer: Ray Parker Jr.

Cheryl Lynn singles chronology
"Keep It Hot" (1980)	"Shake It Up Tonight" (1981)	"Instant Love" (1982)

Music video
- "Shake It Up Tonight" on YouTube

"Shake It Up Tonight" is a song by American singer Cheryl Lynn. Since the success of her debut single, "Got to Be Real", the acclaimed R&B-dance track peaked at No. 5 on both the R&B and Hot Dance Club Play charts, and it also scored number 70 on the Billboard pop charts.

"Shake It Up Tonight" appears on Lynn's LP In the Night, and was written by Mike and Brenda Sutton. The B-side is "Baby", written by Cheryl Lynn and Ray Parker Jr. The ready-made disco song was a moderate success. It became a defining song for Lynn. The 7" version of the song was recorded and produced by Ray Parker Jr. who has worked with her. The 12" version was mixed and produced by Ray Parker Jr. The song was released as the album's first single on May 12, 1981 by Columbia Records.

The song was especially popular in the Los Angeles market. During late August it peaked at number 5 on KUTE and number 11 on KRLA.

== Composition ==
"Shake It Up Tonight" has instrumentation that includes a dance beat, strings and percussion.

== Personnel ==
(Per Apple Music)

- Cheryl Lynn - Lead vocals, backing vocals
- Greg Moore - Guitar
- Ray Parker Jr. - Guitar, percussion arranger
- Darren Carmichael - Fender Rhodes piano
- Michael Sutton - Acoustic piano
- Allen McGrier - Bass
- George Mitchell - Drums
- Ollie E. Brown - Percussion
- Arnell D. Carmichael, J.D. Nicholas, Sharon Jack - Backing vocals
- Gene Page - String arrangements

== Chart performance ==
Chart (1981)	Peak position
US Billboard Hot 100	70
Hot Soul Singles	5
Hot Disco Action	5
US Cash Box Top 100	68

== 7" version ==
1. Shake It Up Tonight (M.Sutton, B.Sutton) – 3:58
2. Baby (C.V yardR. Parker Jr) – 4:20

== 12" version ==
1. "Shake It Up Tonight" – 5:42
2. "Star Love" – 7:23

== Sampling ==
This song has been sampled three times:

- "Party Right" by Chubb Rock featuring Kya
- "Get Ready" by Allen Walker
- "Party Right" by Freddy Fresh
- Jamaican singer Luciano covered the song as a number-one reggae hit in 1993.
