= Start Over (album) =

Studio album by Cheryl Lynn
- Released: February 20, 1987
- Length: 44:08
- Label: Manhattan
- Producer: Bernadette Cooper; Cheryl Lynn; David Paich

Cheryl Lynn chronology
It's Gonna Be Right (1985)	Start Over (1987)	Whatever It Takes (1989)

Singles from Start Over
- 1. "New Dress" Released: March 12, 1987; 2. "If You Were Mine" Released: May 23, 1987

Start Over is the seventh studio album by American singer Cheryl Lynn. It was released by Manhattan Records on February 20, 1987, marking her recording debut with the label. The album charted higher than her previous release, but still stalled at #55 on the US R&B chart. Two singles, "New Dress" and "If You Were Mine" were released, and, while the latter single just missed the R&B top ten, neither of them could revive the project. Start Over would be Lynn's only album for Manhattan Records; Lynn would sign with Virgin Records for her next release.

== Critical reception ==
Professional ratings
Review scores
Source	Rating
AllMusic	1.5/5 stars

AllMusic editor Ron Wynn rated the album one and a half out of five stars. He found that "the songs on Cheryl Lynn's sole Manhattan release, Start Over, are so bland and inept that the phone book would represent a huge upgrade by comparison – which is a shame, because the woman can sing, even if the gelatinous late-'80s production threatens to swallow her like quicksand. Even "Don't Run Away," a reunion with "Got to Be Real" producer David Paich, entombs Lynn's natural sass and vibrancy in near-impenetrable layers of synths. Yuck."

== Track listing ==
Start Over track listing
No.	Title	Writer(s)	Producer(s)	Length
1.	"New Dress"	Bernadette Cooper; Roman Johnson	Cooper; Lynn	5:15
2.	"Don't Bury Me"	Lynn; Thurlene Johnson	Lynn; Todd Cochran	5:12
3.	"Don't Run Away"	Lynn; David Paich	Paich	5:17
4.	"Start Over"	Lynn; Johnson	Lynn; Cochran	4:46
5.	"No Curfew"	Cochran; Johnson	Lynn; Cochran	4:43
6.	"If You Were Mine"	Carl Sturken; Evan Rogers; Robin Smith	Sturken; Rogers; Smith	5:05
7.	"Just Another Pretty Face"	Amp Fiddler; Cooper	Cooper; Lynn	4:51
8.	"Everyday"	Lynn; George Smith III	Lynn	4:29
9.	"Married Man"	Cooper; James Strong; Roman Johnson	Cooper; Lynn	4:29
Total length:				44:08

== Charts ==
Weekly chart performance for Start Over
Chart (1987)	Peak position
US Top R&B/Hip-Hop Albums (Billboard)	55
