= Instant Love =

Studio album by Cheryl Lynn
- Released: June 11, 1982
- Genre: Post-disco
- Length: 38:21
- Label: Columbia
- Producer: Luther Vandross

Cheryl Lynn chronology
In the Night (1981)	Instant Love (1982)	Preppie (1983)

Singles from Instant Love
- 1. "Instant Love" Released: May 13, 1982; 2. "If This World Were Mine" Released: September 4, 1982; 3. "Look Before You Leap" Released: November 11, 1982

Instant Love is a 1982 album by American singer Cheryl Lynn, released on Columbia Records. Luther Vandross produced the album and also performed a duet with Lynn on "If This World Were Mine", a cover of the original recording by Marvin Gaye and Tammi Terrell. The arrangements were by Luther Vandross, Marcus Miller and Nat Adderley, Jr. The album peaked at No. 7 on the R&B album charts and No. 133 on The Billboard 200.

Coming off of his success with Aretha Franklin's "Jump to It," Cheryl and Luther delivered the title cut as a first single, but it only reached #16 on the R&B charts. The two artists did however make an impact with their duet on a remake of the Marvin Gaye & Tammi Terrell classic "If This World Were Mine" which became the biggest hit (#4 R&B) off of this album. A third single, "Look Before You Leap", stalled out at #77 on the R&B charts.

== Critical reception ==
Professional ratings
Review scores
Source	Rating
AllMusic	3/5 stars

In his retrospective review for AllMusic, editor Ron Wynn found that Lynn and Luther Vandross's "duet on "If This World Were Mine" was wonderful, one of the few that came close to rivaling the definitive Marvin Gaye/Tammi Terrell original. Both it and the title cut were big hits, and it seemed Lynn was about to make the breakthrough. But the album itself didn't quite explode, and Lynn just missed reaching the next level on the urban contemporary circuit."

== Track listing ==
Instant Love track listing
No.	Title	Writer(s)	Length
1.	"Instant Love"	Luther Vandross; Marcus Miller	5:12
2.	"Sleep Walkin'"	Vandross; Miller	6:27
3.	"Day After Day"	Tawatha Agee	4:36
4.	"Look Before You Leap"	David Batteau; Michael Sembello	4:04
5.	"Say You'll Be Mine"	Agee; Kevin Robinson	5:07
6.	"I Just Wanna Be Your Fantasy"	Lynn; George Smith III	4:04
7.	"Believe in Me"	Ashford & Simpson	3:24
8.	"If This World Were Mine" (with Luther Vandross)	Marvin Gaye	5:27
Total length:			38:21

2012 reissue bonus tracks
No.	Title	Writer(s)	Length
9.	"Instant Love" (single edit)	Vandross; Miller	3:58
10.	"If This World Were Mine" (with Luther Vandross)	Gaye	4:00

== Personnel ==
Musicians

- Cheryl Lynn – lead vocals, background vocals (4, 5)
- Nat Adderley Jr. – keyboards (1–4, 6, 8), acoustic piano (7), arrangements (4, 6, 8), rhythm arrangement (3, 5)
- Tawatha Agee – background vocals (1, 2, 6)
- Phillip Ballou – background vocals (1, 2)
- Crusher Bennett – percussion (8)
- Michelle Cobbs – background vocals (1, 2)
- Paulinho da Costa – percussion (3, 5, 6)
- Steve Ferrone – drums (3–6)
- Yogi Horton – drums (1, 2, 8)
- Steve Kroon – percussion (1, 2)
- Steve Love – guitar (1, 2)
- Michael McGloiry – guitar (3, 5, 6)
- Marcus Miller – bass (1–6, 8), synthesizer (1, 2, 4), arrangements (1, 2)
- Doc Powell – guitar (8)
- Paul Riser – string arrangement (3, 5, 7), horn arrangements (3, 5)
- Michael Sembello – guitars (4)
- Fonzi Thornton – background vocals (1), additional background vocals (2)
- Luther Vandross – lead vocals (8), background vocals (1, 6), additional background vocals (2), arrangements (1, 2, 6, 8)
- Ed Walsh – synthesizer (6)
- Brenda White – background vocals (1, 2, 6)

Technical personnel

- Larkin Arnold – executive producer
- Carl Beatty – additional engineering
- Michael H. Brauer – engineer, mixing
- Don Brewer – assistant engineer
- Greg Calbi – mastering
- Doug Epstein – additional engineering
- Bobby Gordon – assistant engineer
- Sephra Herman – production coordinator, horn and strings contractor
- Andy Hoffman – assistant engineer
- John Hanlon – assistant engineer
- Hank Meyer – production coordinator
- Harry Spiridakis – assistant engineer
- Luther Vandross – producer

== Charts ==
Weekly chart performance for Instant Love
Chart (1982)	Peak position
US Billboard 200	133
US Top R&B/Hip-Hop Albums (Billboard)	7
