= I'm Going Down (Rose Royce song) =

1976 single by Rose Royce

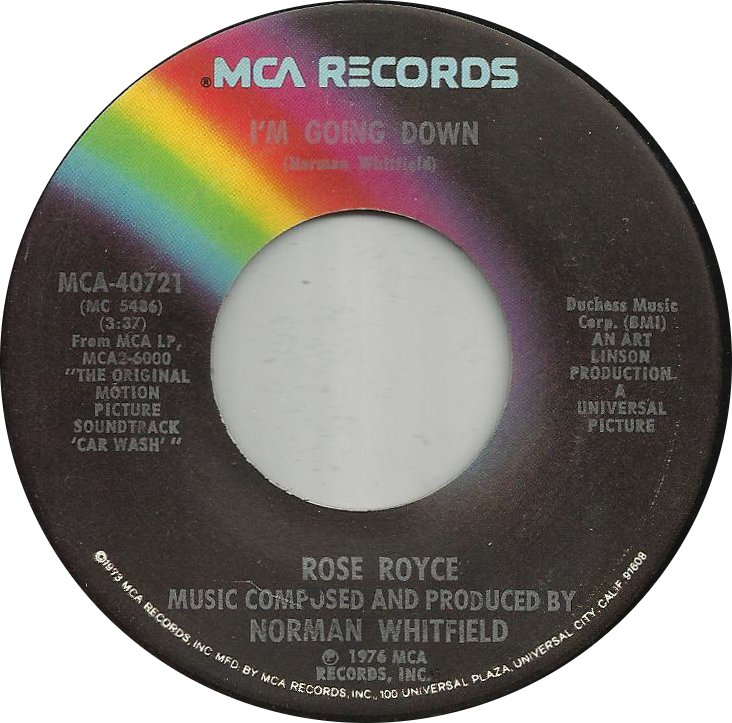
- Side A of US vinyl single

Single by Rose Royce

from the album Car Wash: Original Motion Picture Soundtrack
- B-side: "Yo Yo"
- Released: September 1976
- Recorded: 1976
- Genre: Soul; R&B; soft rock
- Length: 3:37
- Label: Whitfield/MCA
- Songwriter: Norman Whitfield
- Producer: Norman Whitfield

Rose Royce singles chronology
"I Wanna Get Next to You" (1977)	"I'm Going Down" (1976)	"Do Your Dance" (1977)

"I'm Going Down" is a song written and produced by Norman Whitfield, and performed by American soul and R&B group Rose Royce in 1976. It is from the film Car Wash and is featured on its soundtrack. In 1994, it was covered by American singer Mary J. Blige.

== Rose Royce version ==
The Rose Royce (original) version received moderate success. It peaked at number seventy on the US Billboard Hot 100 and reached number ten on the R&B singles chart. In the film Car Wash, the song serves as a double entendre, as it complements the screen time of Maureen, a forlorn prostitute who desperately seeks a chance at true love with Joe, even as she turns tricks.

=== Charts ===
Charts (1977)	Peak position
Canada Top Singles (RPM)	58
France (SNEP)	5
Italy (FIMI)	13
US Billboard Hot 100	70
US Hot R&B/Hip-Hop Songs (Billboard)	10

== Mary J. Blige version ==
"I'm Goin' Down"
- US retail cassette variant of standard artwork

Single by Mary J. Blige

from the album My Life
- Released: January 18, 1995
- Genre: R&B; soul
- Length: 3:44
- Label: Uptown; MCA
- Songwriter: Norman Whitfield
- Producers: Sean "Puffy" Combs; Chucky Thompson

Mary J. Blige singles chronology
"Be Happy" (1994)	"I'm Goin' Down" (1995)	"Mary Jane (All Night Long)" (1995)

Music video
- "I'm Goin' Down" on YouTube

In 1994, American R&B singer-songwriter Mary J. Blige covered "I'm Going Down", titled "I'm Goin' Down", for her second studio album, My Life (1994). Her version was produced by Sean "Puffy" Combs and Chucky Thompson. Released in January 1995 by Uptown and MCA as the album's second single, Blige's version peaked at number thirteen on the US Hot R&B/Hip-Hop Songs chart and number twenty-two on the US Billboard Hot 100. In mid-1995, Blige released a remix featuring Mr. Cheeks of The Lost Boyz featuring co-production from "Prince" Charles Alexander and Mark "Led" Ledford, and contains portions of "The What" (1994) by American rappers The Notorious B.I.G. and Method Man. "I'm Going Down" is frequently performed at many of Blige's concerts and as well as live sets.

=== Critical reception ===
Dave Sholin from the Gavin Report felt "I'm Goin' Down" "offers this awesome vocalist a chance to give one of her most soulful performances. It sounds great anywhere, but it's even more incredible on the air." In his weekly UK chart commentary, James Masterton remarked that Blige "sparkles" on "a rather fabulous cover" of the old Rose Royce song. James Hamilton from the Record Mirror Dance Update described it as an "exceptional ultra soulful sparse dramatic 61.7bpm Rose Royce remake in authentic mid-Sixties slow Stax/Volt type" in his weekly dance column.

Jonathan Bernstein from Spin named it "a storming slice of down-on-my-knees, stop-start soul originally found on the Car Wash soundtrack, and you realize any previous praise for the record has been barely felt because you know the difference between the proficient material that went before and a great song. And this is a great song." In 2025, Billboard magazine ranked the song number 72 in their list of "Top 100 Breakup Songs of All Time", writing that Blige's cover "gets increasingly heart-wrenching from start to finish, with the Queen of Hip-Hop Soul going from spiraling about her breakup to fully pleading with her ex to take her back."

=== Music video ===
The accompanying music video for Blige's "I'm Goin' Down" was directed from January 14–15, 1995, by American artist, photographer and director Matthew Rolston, and was shot in black and white, with Blige as a lounge singer performing the song in a club, and wearing an-all black suit with a matching hat, walking downstairs (being duplicated over and over again). In the end, the bar patrons applaud her as she drops the microphone and walks offstage.

=== Track listings ===
- US cassette single
1. "I'm Goin' Down" (Album version) – 3:43
2. "I'm Goin' Down" (Remix) – 3:48
- UK CD and 12-inch single
1. "I'm Goin' Down" (album version) – 3:43
2. "You Bring Me Joy" (Smoove's soul mix) – 5:24
3. "You Bring Me Joy" (E-Smoove's Joyous club mix) – 10:12
4. "You Bring Me Joy" (Smoove Funk mix) – 4:38
- UK cassette single
1. "I'm Goin' Down" (album version) – 3:43
2. "You Bring Me Joy" (Smoove's soul mix) – 5:24
- Australian CD single
1. "I'm Goin' Down" (album version) – 3:43
2. "You Bring Me Joy" (E-Smoove's Joyous club mix) – 10:12
3. "You Bring Me Joy" (Smoove Funk mix) – 4:38

=== Credits and personnel ===
Credits are adapted from the My Life liner notes.

- Mary J. Blige – vocals
- "Prince" Charles Alexander – tenor saxophone, piccolo flute, additional flute, recording engineer, mixing
- Mark "Led" Ledford – trumpet
- Bruce Purse – trumpet
- Vincent Henry – alto saxophone
- Paul Pesco – guitar
- Lenny Underwood – piano
- Fred McFarlane – additional keyboards
- Regina Carter – violin
- Diane Monroe – violin
- Lesa Terry – violin
- Eileen Folson – cello
- Victor Bailey – bass played by
- Gloria Agostini – harp
- Kevin "K-Dog" Johnson – drums
- Frank Colon – percussion

=== Charts ===
==== Weekly charts ====
Chart (1995)	Peak position
Europe (Eurochart Hot 100)	75
Scotland (OCC)	43
UK Singles (Official Charts)	12
UK Dance (Official Charts)	5
UK Hip Hop/R&B (Official Charts)	3
US Billboard Hot 100	22
US Hot R&B/Hip-Hop Songs (Billboard)	13
US Rhythmic Airplay (Billboard)	7
US Cash Box Top 100	19

==== Year-end charts ====
Chart (1995)	Position
US Hot R&B/Hip-Hop Songs (Billboard)	82

=== Release history ===
Region	Date	Format(s)	Label(s)	Ref.
United States	January 18, 1995	—N/a	Uptown; MCA	
United Kingdom	April 3, 1995	12-inch vinyl; CD; cassette	Uptown; MCA	
Australia	June 5, 1995	CD	Uptown; MCA	

== In popular culture ==
"Oh, Boy" off of Cam'ron's third album Come Home with Me samples the original Rose Royce song. Mariah Carey also sampled the song on her 2002 album Charmbracelet for the song "Boy (I Need You)". Both songs were composed by hip-hop producer Justin "Just Blaze" Smith and are almost identical.

On the episode season 3 finale of Sister, Sister, Tamera (Tamera Mowry) covered the song for a talent show, winning a bet that her sister Tia (Tia Mowry) had with her enemy—and Tamera's opponent, Marva.

- Female R&B group Y?N-Vee released a cover version from their self-titled 1994 album, just a few weeks before Mary J. Blige released her version of the song.
- Marcus Canty performed this song on season one of The X Factor (U.S.) during "Movie Week" and the elimination.
- Megan Hilty performed the song in the "Tech" episode of Smash.
- Sera Hill performed the song in "Episode 5: The Blind Auditions, Part 5" on the second season of The Voice (U.S.)
- In the film Little, Jordan and April perform the Mary J. Blige version of the song inside an upscale restaurant, with (13-year old) Jordan starting the performance while lying on a bar.
- Paige Thomas performed this song as her audition for the second season of The X Factor (U.S.)
- Taylor Beckham performed this song on "Episode 3: The Blind Auditions, Part 3" on the fourth season of The Voice (U.S.)
- Beyoncé covered this song on her Renaissance World Tour.
