= In Love (Cheryl Lynn album) =

Studio album by Cheryl Lynn
- Released: 1979
- Studio: Criteria, Miami; Record Plant, Los Angeles; Sunset Sound, Hollywood; Cherokee, Hollywood; CTS, London; Nova Suite, London
- Genre: R&B
- Length: 43:05
- Label: Columbia
- Producer: Barry Blue

Cheryl Lynn chronology
Cheryl Lynn (1978)	In Love (1979)	In the Night (1981)

In Love is the second studio album by American musician Cheryl Lynn. It was released in 1979 via Columbia Records.

== Critical reception ==
Professional ratings
Review scores
Source	Rating
AllMusic	3/5 stars

AllMusic rated the album three out of five stars.

== Track listing ==
All tracks produced by Barry Blue.

In Love track listing
No.	Title	Writer(s)	Length
1.	"I've Got Faith in You"	Bobby Caldwell	4:46
2.	"Hide It Away"	Greg Phillinganes; Michael Sembello; Nathan Watts; Raymond Pounds	4:38
3.	"Feel It"	Brian Becvar	5:09
4.	"In Love"	David Cohen; Leslie Ruchala	5:56
5.	"Keep It Hot"	Cheryl Lynn; George Bryan	5:24
6.	"I've Got Just What You Need"	John Footman; Judy Weider	3:52
7.	"Love Bomb"	Blue; Lynsey de Paul	3:58
8.	"Chances"	Lynn	4:10
9.	"Don't Let It Fade Away"	Rod Bowkett	5:12

== Personnel ==
- Cheryl Lynn — lead and backing vocals
- Bobby Caldwell, Cornell Dupree, Paul Jackson Jr., Jeff Lee, Michael McGlory — guitar
- Greg Phillinganes, David Foster, Paul Griffin, Richard Tee, Brian Becvar, Jean Roussel, John Footman, John Cameron — keyboards
- James Gadson, Andy Newmark, Bernard Purdie — drums
- Chuck Rainey, David Shields — bass guitar
- Bobbye Hall — congas
- Chris Karan, Morris Pert — percussion
- Michael Brecker — saxophone
- Delbert Langston, Sharon Jack — backing vocals

== Charts ==
Weekly chart performance for In Love
Chart (1979)	Peak position
US Billboard 200	167
US Top R&B/Hip-Hop Albums (Billboard)	47
