= In the Night (Cheryl Lynn album) =

Studio album by Cheryl Lynn
- Released: April 6, 1981
- Recorded: October 1980 – March 1981
- Studios: Ameraycan Studios, Hollywood, California
- Genres: R&B; soul; post-disco
- Length: 48:05
- Labels: Columbia; Sony
- Producer: Ray Parker Jr.

Cheryl Lynn chronology
In Love (1979)	In the Night (1981)	Instant Love (1982)

Singles from In the Night
- 1. "Shake It Up Tonight" Released: May 12, 1981

In the Night is the third studio album by American R&B singer and songwriter Cheryl Lynn, released on Columbia Records on April 6, 1981. The album includes the hit Soul/dance track "Shake It Up Tonight" which reached to number five on both the Soul and Dance charts.

== Critical reception ==
Professional ratings
Review scores
Source	Rating
AllMusic	3.5/5 stars

In The Night received favorable reviews from critics.

== Track listing ==
1. "Shake It Up Tonight" – 5:41 (Michael and Brenda Sutton)
2. "Show You How" – 4:06 (Cheryl Lynn, John Barnes, Linda Booth)
3. "In the Night" – 4:27 (Ray Parker Jr.)
4. "Hurry Home" – 4:22 (Lynn, Greg Jackson)
5. "I'm on Fire" – 4:22 (Parker Jr.)
6. "With Love on Our Side" – 4:21 (Parker Jr., Kamau Peterson)
7. "If You'll Be True to Me" – 4:06 (Lynn, Parker Jr.)
8. "What's on Your Mind" – 4:06 (Lynn, George Dream)
9. "Baby" – 4:21 (Lynn, Parker Jr.)

== Personnel ==
- Cheryl Lynn - vocals
- Arnell D. Carmichael, J.D. Nicholas, Sharon Jack - backing vocals
- Ray Parker Jr. - guitars, bass guitar, keyboards, synthesizers, drums, percussion
- Greg Moore, Wah Wah Watson, David T. Walker - guitars
- John Barnes, George Dream, Greg Jackson, Michael Boddicker, Michael Sutton, Darren Carmichael - keyboards, synthesizers
- Sylvester Rivers - piano, synthesized bass
- Marcus Miller, Scott Edwards, Allen McGrier - bass
- George F. Mitchell, James Gadson, Larry Tolbert - drums
- Ollie E. Brown - percussion
- Strings arranged by Gene Page

== Charts ==
Chart (1981)	Peak position
Billboard Top LPs & Tape	104
Top Soul LPs	14

=== Singles ===
Year	Single	Chart positions		
Year	Single	US Hot 100	US R&B	US Dance
1981	"Shake It Up Tonight"	70	5	5
