= Keep It Hot (song) =

1980 funk and disco single by Cheryl Lynn

Single by Cheryl Lynn

from the album In Love
- A-side: "Keep It Hot"
- B-side: "In Love"
- Released: 1980
- Genre: Disco
- Length: 5:24
- Label: Columbia
- Songwriters: Cheryl Lynn, George Bryant
- Producer: Barry Blue

Cheryl Lynn singles chronology
"I've Got Faith In You" (1980)	"Keep It Hot" (1980)	"Shake It Up Tonight" (1981)

"Keep It Hot" is a 1980 funk and disco song by Cheryl Lynn. The song was released as a single in 1980 from Lynn's 1979 album In Love. The song peaked at number 12 on the US Dance Chart in 1980.

== Track listing ==
Side A

1. "Keep It Hot" - 5:25

Side B

1. "In Love" - 3:48
