= Car Wash (film) =

1976 comedy film directed by Michael Schultz

- Theatrical release poster artwork by Drew Struzan
- Directed by: Michael Schultz
- Written by: Joel Schumacher
- Produced by: Art Linson; Gary Stromberg
- Starring: Franklyn Ajaye; Bill Duke; George Carlin; Irwin Corey; Ivan Dixon; Antonio Fargas; Jack Kehoe; Clarence Muse; Lorraine Gary; The Pointer Sisters; Richard Pryor; Garret Morris
- Cinematography: Frank Stanley
- Edited by: Christopher Holmes
- Music by: Norman Whitfield
- Production company: Universal Pictures
- Distributed by: Universal Pictures
- Release date: September 3, 1976
- Running time: 97 minutes
- Country: United States
- Language: English
- Budget: $2 million
- Box office: $14 million

Car Wash is a 1976 American comedy film directed by Michael Schultz from a screenplay by Joel Schumacher, and starring an ensemble cast. Originally conceived as a stage musical, the film is an episodic comedy about a day in the lives of a close-knit group of employees at a Los Angeles car wash. It features Franklyn Ajaye, George Carlin, Irwin Corey, Ivan Dixon, Bill Duke, Antonio Fargas, Jack Kehoe, Clarence Muse, Lorraine Gary, The Pointer Sisters, Richard Pryor, and Garrett Morris.

The film was one of several Black-focused films produced by a major Hollywood studio during the 1970s. It was released by Universal Pictures on September 3, 1976. It won the Technical Grand Prize at the 1977 Cannes Film Festival and was nominated for the Palme d'Or, the first film by a Black or African-American director to be honored.

Despite a mediocre commercial performance on initial release, the film received widespread positive reviews from critics and has developed a strong cult following. The film is also noted for its Grammy Award-winning soundtrack by the funk group Rose Royce.

== Plot ==
Over a single Friday in July, the Dee-Luxe Car Wash welcomes all manner of strange and unusual visitors. A hysterical wealthy woman from Beverly Hills arrives with a carsick son. Money-hungry evangelist "Daddy Rich," who preaches a pseudo-gospel of prosperity theology, appears with his loyal (and singing) entourage, The Wilson Sisters. The employees must also deal with a man they believe is the notorious "pop bottle bomber" being sought that day by the police. It alarms employees, customers, and the owner of the car wash, Leon "Mr. B" Barrow, but the strange man's "bomb" turns out to be simply a urine sample he is taking to the hospital for a liver test.

Mr. B's son Irwin Barrow, a left-wing college student who smokes pot in the men's restroom and carries around a copy of Quotations from Chairman Mao, insists on spending a day with the "working class" employees, whom he considers "brothers" in the "struggle". As he prepares for work, he sets off motion sensors that give him the first "human car wash," which he graciously accepts (though while pot-induced). A taxi driver searches fruitlessly for a prostitute named Marleen, who stiffed him for a fare earlier and has her own hopes shattered later on as a customer with whom she apparently has fallen in love has given her a false telephone number. Abdullah Mohammed Akbar, formerly known as Duane, is a tall Black Power revolutionary and recent convert to Islam who dismisses Daddy Rich's preaching when the quartet visits and collects donations from the employees. Middle-aged ex-convict Lonnie, the foreman of the car wash, tries to mentor Abdullah while struggling to raise two young children and fend off his parole officer. Abdullah confronts the flamboyant homosexual Lindy and sharply criticizes his cross-dressing, to which Lindy replies, "Honey, I am more man than you'll ever be and more woman than you'll ever get."

Theodore Chauncey "T.C." Elcott, another young employee, is determined to win a radio call-in contest to get tickets for a rock concert and to convince his estranged girlfriend Mona, a waitress working in a diner across the street, to accompany him, eventually succeeding. Musicians Floyd and Lloyd, who have an audition for an agent when their shift ends, rehearse their jazz-blues dance moves in front of bewildered customers. An employee named Justin clashes with his girlfriend, Loretta, who wants him to return to college, but he declines, feeling that a black man like him will not get anywhere in the world with any kind of education. His elderly grandfather, Snapper, works as the shoe shine man at the car wash and is a Daddy Rich follower.

Other employees include womanizer Geronimo ("married three and a half times"), a thin African-American with feathers in his hair; cowboy Scruggs, the gas pump operator worried about having caught a "social disease" the night before; overweight, good-natured Hippo, who is constantly listening to his transistor radio and hooks up with Marleen; a scheming, jokester Latino named Chuco; a Native American named Goody, who wears a homemade hat with a pig face, tail, and pointy ears; scruffy, middle-aged Charlie; con artist and bookie Slide, who later gets arrested for a series of unpaid parking tickets; and the "holier than thou" Earl, who sees himself as superior to his colleagues because he does not get wet (since he waxes the cars).

Among everything, Mr. B frequently flirts with the young, busty cashier/receptionist Marsha to escape his troubled home life. Constantly tense, he worries about his car wash going out of business due to a competitor a few miles down the street. Lonnie, conversely, has numerous ideas on how to save the car wash, but everyone else, including the miserly Mr. B, ignores him. Later, Abdullah, after being fired by Mr. B for his unexplained absences from work for the past several weeks, appears in the office with a gun while Lonnie is closing up, intending to rob the business. Lonnie dissuades him, knowing where a life of crime will lead. The day ends sorrowfully as everyone goes their separate ways.

== Cast ==
- Franklyn Ajaye as Theodore Chauncey "T.C." Elcott
- Sully Boyar as Leon "Mr. B" Barrow
- Richard Brestoff as Irwin Barrow
- Carmine Caridi as Foolish Father
- George Carlin as Taxi Driver
- Irwin Corey as "The Mad Bomber"
- Ivan Dixon as Lonnie
- Bill Duke as Duane / Abdullah Mohammed Akbar
- Antonio Fargas as Lindy
- Michael Fennell as Calvin
- Arthur French as Charlie
- Lorraine Gary as Hysterical Lady
- Darrow Igus as Floyd
- Leonard Jackson as Earl
- DeWayne Jessie as Lloyd
- Lauren Jones as Marleen
- Jack Kehoe as Scruggs
- Henry Kingi as Goody
- Melanie Mayron as Marsha
- Garrett Morris as "Slide"
- Clarence Muse as "Snapper"
- Leon Pinkney as Justin
- The Pointer Sisters as The Wilson Sisters
- Richard Pryor as "Daddy Rich"
- Tracy Reed as Mona
- Pepe Serna as Chuco
- James Spinks as "Hippo"
- Ray Vitte as "Geronimo"
- Renn Woods as Loretta
- Antonie Becker as Charlene
- Antar Mubarak as Sonny Fredericks
- Otis Sistrunk as Otis
- Tim Thomerson as Ken, Marsha's date
- Jason Bernard as Lonnie's parole officer

Television version only

- Brooke Adams as Terry
- Danny DeVito as Joe

=== Other actors ===
Danny DeVito and Brooke Adams appeared in the film as Joe and Terry, the owners of a food stand called 'Big Joe's Dog House', which is located next to the car wash. Though they had speaking roles, nearly all of their scenes were deleted from the theatrical version, and they were only seen in the background. Their scenes were restored for the edited television version.

The film also featured the speaking voices of local L.A. disc jockeys Jay Butler, J. J. Jackson, Rod McGrew, Sarina C. Grant, and Cleveland's Billy Bass, all heard in the film's background on the fictional "KGYS" radio station.

== Production ==
=== Pre-production ===
The producers originally intended the project to be a stage production, which would feature a replica car wash on stage, hoping that the project, if successful, could be adapted as a movie. They pitched the idea to Universal Pictures' then-president Ned Tanen, who persuaded them to make the film version instead. Joel Schumacher was chosen to write based on his work writing Sparkle.

=== Music ===
The soundtrack was recorded before filming commenced. The director Michael Schultz wanted the actors to actually listen to the same music that would later be added in post-production while filming the scenes.

The soundtrack album Car Wash, recorded by Rose Royce, was a major success, yielding three Billboard R&B Top Ten singles: "Car Wash", "I Wanna Get Next to You", and "I'm Going Down". The title track, written and produced by Norman Whitfield, was a #1 hit and was one of the biggest hit singles of the disco era. Meanwhile, the Pointer Sisters' "You Gotta Believe" — which the group performed during their cameo as the Wilson Sisters in the film — was a Top Twenty R&B hit.

The Car Wash soundtrack won a Grammy Award for Best Score Soundtrack Album at the 19th Annual Grammy Awards in 1977.

== Reception ==
The film has a score of 86% on Rotten Tomatoes based on 29 reviews, with an average score of 6.8 out of 10. Metacritic, which uses a weighted average, assigned the film a score of 71 out of 100, based on 9 critics, indicating "generally favorable" reviews.

Roger Ebert gave the film three-and-a-half stars out of four, calling it "a sunny, lively comedy" that also gracefully handled a few more serious subplots, with a "tremendous sense of life." Vincent Canby of The New York Times called it "a cheerful, somewhat vulgar, very cleverly executed comedy," adding, "Nothing terribly dramatic happens, and some of the comedy gets a bit forced, but the wonder of the film is how it manages to succeed so much of the time." Gene Siskel gave the film three stars out of four and called it "quite entertaining" with "plenty of strong performances." Arthur D. Murphy of Variety wrote, "An enormous, and enormously talented, cast is put through its paces masterfully by director Michael Schultz, making the most of Joel Schumacher's zany screenplay." Charles Champlin of the Los Angeles Times called it "a high-energy, high-entertainment, raucously well-observed slice of life." Sander Vanocur of The Washington Post called it "more than a movie. It's an experience that will make you feel good."

Film historian Vito Russo cited the character Lindy, played by Antonio Fargas, as being both funny and challenging through his gay militancy. Russo deems Lindy's response to the militant Abdullah Mohammed Akbar (Bill Duke) as being potentially revolutionary had it not been placed strictly within a comedic context. African American cultural critic Angela Nelson identifies Lindy as a "sophisticated sissy." The "sophisticated sissy" characterization is often used as an easy contrast to the "appropriate" masculine behavior that heterosexual black male characters are expected to display.

=== Awards and nominations ===
Institution	Year	Category	Nominee	Result	Ref.
Cannes Film Festival	1977	Palme d'Or	Michael Schultz	Nominated	
Cannes Film Festival	1977	Technical Grand Prize	Michael Schultz	Won	
Cannes Film Festival	1977	Best Music	Norman Whitfield	Won	
Golden Globe Awards	1977	Best Original Song	"Theme from Car Wash"; Music: Norman Whitfield; Lyrics: Whitfield & Rose Royce	Nominated	
Grammy Awards	1977	Best Score Soundtrack for Visual Media	Norman Whitfield	Won	

== Television version ==
Car Wash had its network television premiere on NBC Monday Night at the Movies in 1978. Along with the standard dubbing of strong language, many scenes that included the gay character Lindy (Antonio Fargas) were trimmed or deleted. To replace these shortened scenes, and therefore shortened film, a subplot of a diner owner Joe (Danny DeVito) (scenes shot for the theatrical version, but cut prior to release) were reinserted.

As of 2013, commercially available versions of the movie were of the original theatrical release, not the revised TV version.

== Potential television series ==
In 2024, NBC launched a project to revive Car Wash through a TV series.
