= Preppie (album) =

Studio album by Cheryl Lynn
- Released: November 4, 1983
- Recorded: 1983
- Studio: Fiddler's Studio (Hollywood, CA)
- Genre: Post-disco
- Length: 43:50
- Label: Columbia
- Producer: Cheryl Lynn; Jimmy Jam and Terry Lewis

Cheryl Lynn chronology
Instant Love (1982)	Preppie (1983)	It's Gonna Be Right (1985)

Singles from Preppie
- 1. "Preppie" Released: 1983; 2. "Encore" Released: 1983; 3. "This Time" Released: 1984

Preppie is the fifth studio album by American recording R&B artist Cheryl Lynn, released on November 4, 1983, by Columbia Records. The album features the R&B hit singles, "Encore" and "This Time".

Preppie includes the hit singles "Encore" (No. 1 R&B hit) and "This Time" (No. 49 R&B hit). It reached #8 on the R&B albums chart. The album was primarily produced by Lynn herself, with the exception of "Encore," which was produced by Jimmy Jam and Terry Lewis.

== Critical reception ==
Professional ratings
Review scores
Source	Rating
AllMusic	3/5 stars

AllMusic rated the album three out of five stars.

== Track listing ==
Preppie track listing
No.	Title	Writer(s)	Length
1.	"Encore"	Jimmy Jam; Terry Lewis	5:20
2.	"Fix It"	Cheryl Lynn; Andrew Gouche; Michael McGloiry; Thurlene Johnson	4:02
3.	"Fool a Fool"	Kevin Guillaume; Johnson	3:50
4.	"This Time"	David Richard Cohen; Johnson	4:28
5.	"Change the Channel"	Vince DiCola; Johnson	3:15
6.	"Preppie"	Lynn; McGloiry	4:08
7.	"Love Rush"	Lynn; John Barnes	4:16
8.	"No One Else Will Do"	Arlesha Devasia; Lorrin Bates; Perry Peyton	4:49
9.	"Free"	Lynn; Steve Stephens	4:40
10.	"Life's Too Short"	Chyase	5:07
Total length:			43:50

2012 reissue bonus tracks
No.	Title	Writer(s)	Length
11.	"Encore" (12" Dance Mix)	Jam; Lewis	8:18
12.	"Free" (Special 12" Version)	Lynn; Stephens	7:19
13.	"Preppie" (12" Extended Mix)	Lynn; McGloiry	5:00
14.	"Preppie" (12" Club Mix)	Lynn; McGloiry	5:34

== Charts ==
Weekly chart performance for Instant Love
Chart (1983)	Peak position
US Billboard 200	161
US Top R&B/Hip-Hop Albums (Billboard)	8
