= Cheryl Lynn (album) =

Studio album by Cheryl Lynn
- Released: October 13, 1978
- Studios: Studio 55; Sunset Sound (Hollywood); Western Recorders (Los Angeles); CBS Recording Studios (New York City)
- Genre: Disco
- Length: 40:42
- Label: Columbia
- Producers: David Paich; Marty Paich

Cheryl Lynn chronology
Cheryl Lynn (1978)	In Love (1979)

Singles from Cheryl Lynn
- 1. "Got to Be Real" Released: August 14, 1978; 2. "Star Love" Released: January 15, 1979; 3. "You Saved My Day" Released: July 7, 1979

Cheryl Lynn is the debut studio album by American singer Cheryl Lynn. It was released by Columbia Records on October 13, 1978, in the United States. The album reached number 23 on the US Billboard 200 chart and was certified gold by the Recording Industry Association of America (RIAA) on February 23, 1979. The album includes Lynn's first single and biggest hit "Got to Be Real" (1978).

== Critical reception ==
Professional ratings
Review scores
Source	Rating
AllMusic	4/5 stars

AllMusic editor Andy Kellman called Cheryl Lynn "easily her best full-length, full of solid album cuts that act as support for the key singles rather than attempting to match them or even duplicate them with forced hooks and bungled attempts at making a diverse listen."

== Track listing ==
Cheryl Lynn track listing
No.	Title	Writer(s)	Length
1.	"Got to Be Real"	Cheryl Lynn; David Paich; David Foster	5:10
2.	"All My Lovin'"	Lynn	4:49
3.	"Star Love"	John Footman; Judy Weider	7:23
4.	"Come in from the Rain"	Carole Sager; Melissa Manchester	3:35
5.	"You Saved My Day"	Charles May	4:21
6.	"Give My Love to You"	Ray Parker Jr.; Lynn	3:33
7.	"Nothing You Say"	Lynn	3:58
8.	"You're the One"	Lynn; Footman	4:09
9.	"Daybreak (Storybook Children)"	David Pomeranz; Spencer Proffer	3:44

== Personnel ==
- Cheryl Lynn – lead and backing vocals

Tracks 1, 2, 3, 5, 6

- Drums – James Gadson
- Bass guitar – David Shields
- Guitar – Ray Parker Jr.
- Keyboards – David Paich

Tracks 4, 7, 9

- Drums – Bernard Purdie
- Bass guitar – Chuck Rainey
- Guitar – David T. Walker
- Keyboards – Richard Tee, David Paich, Marty Paich
- D. J. Rogers – vocals on track 7

Track 8

- Drums – Bernard Purdie
- Bass guitar – Chuck Rainey
- Guitar – David T. Walker, Steve Lukather
- Keyboards – Richard Tee, David Paich, Marty Paich
- Woodwinds – Ronnie Lang, Ted Nash, Gene Cipriano, Ernie Watts, Pete Christlieb
- Trumpet – Chuck Findley, Steve Madaio, Bobby Findley, Gary Grant, Bobby Shew, Dalton Smith
- Trombone – Lew McCreary, Dick Nash, Dick Hyde
- Percussion – Harvey Mason, Joe Porcaro, Bobbye Hall
- Strings concertmaster – Sid Sharp
- Rhythm, string and horn arrangements – David and Marty Paich

== Charts ==
Weekly chart performance for Cheryl Lynn
Chart (1978–79)	Peak position
Canada Top Albums/CDs (RPM)	22
US Billboard 200	23
US Top R&B/Hip-Hop Albums (Billboard)	5

== Certifications ==
Certifications for Cheryl Lynn
Region	Certification	Certified units/sales
United States (RIAA)	Gold	500,000^{^}
^{^} Shipments figures based on certification alone.
