= Whatever It Takes (Cheryl Lynn album) =

Studio album by Cheryl Lynn
- Released: September 12, 1989
- Length: 41:37
- Label: Virgin
- Producers: Michael Carpenter; Andy Goldmark; Jesse Johnson; Cheryl Lynn; Bruce Roberts; Evan Rogers; Carl Sturken; Art Zamora

Cheryl Lynn chronology
Start Over (1987)	Whatever It Takes (1989)	Good Time (1995)

Whatever It Takes is the eighth studio album by American singer Cheryl Lynn. It was released by Virgin Records on September 12, 1989.

== Critical reception ==
Professional ratings
Review scores
Source	Rating
AllMusic	3/5 stars

AllMusic editor Ed Hogan noted a "somewhat harder, edgier sound with trash can-timbre beats and less of a light poppy feel to her material."

== Track listing ==
Whatever It Takes track listing
No.	Title	Writer(s)	Producer(s)	Length
1.	"Upset"	Cheryl Lynn; Carl McIntosh; Jane Eugene; Steve Nichol	Lynn; Jesse Johnson; Jazzy L.^{[a]}	6:23
2.	"Every Time I Try to Say Goodbye"	Carl Sturken; Evan Rogers; Paul Barry	Lynn; Sturken; Rogers; Keith "K. C." Cohen^{[a]}	5:01
3.	"Whatever It Takes"	Lynn; Keith Lewis; Kim Cage	Lynn; J. Johnson	5:19
4.	"Good for Me"	Lynn; McIntosh; Eugene; Nichol	Lynn; J. Johnson	5:27
5.	"Overworked 'n' Underloved"	Lynn; J. Johnson; Thurlene Johnson	Lynn; J. Johnson	5:04
6.	"I Surrender"	Lynn; Sturken; Rogers	Lynn; Sturken; Rogers	5:07
7.	"Most of All"	Andy Goldmark; Bruce Roberts	Goldmark; Roberts	4:30
8.	"The Bottom Line"	Lynn; Art Zamora; Eric Strickland; Michael Carpenter; T. Johnson	Lynn; Zamora; Carpenter	4:23
Total length:				41:37

Notes

- ^{^[a]} signifies additional producer(s)

== Charts ==
Weekly chart performance for Whatever It Takes
Chart (1989)	Peak position
US Top R&B/Hip-Hop Albums (Billboard)	42
