= Car Wash (song) =

1976 single by Rose Royce

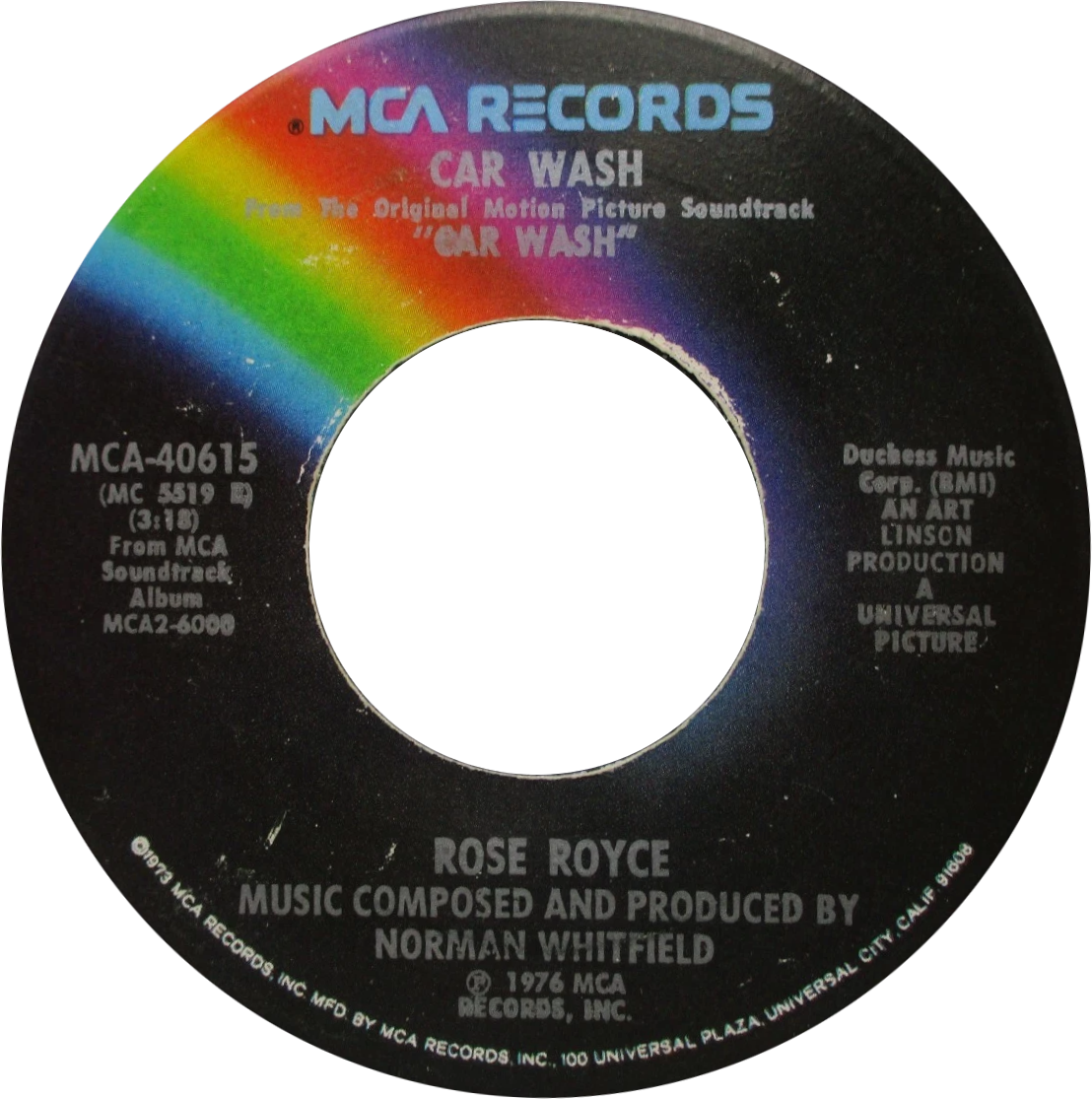
- US single of the Rose Royce recording

Single by Rose Royce

from the album Car Wash: Original Motion Picture Soundtrack
- B-side: "Water"
- Released: September 1976
- Genre: Disco; funk
- Length: 5:06 (album version); 3:18 (single version)
- Label: MCA
- Songwriter: Norman Whitfield
- Producer: Norman Whitfield

Rose Royce singles chronology
"Car Wash" (1976)	"I Wanna Get Next to You" (1977)

"Car Wash" is a song by the American soul and R&B band Rose Royce. Written and arranged by the ex-Motown producer Norman Whitfield, the song was the group's first single and one of the most notable successes of the 1970s disco era. "Car Wash", the theme of the 1976 film Car Wash, was Rose Royce's most successful single and the lead single from their first studio album, the Car Wash soundtrack. Reaching number one on the US Billboard Hot 100 and Hot Soul Singles charts, "Car Wash" rose to number three on the National Disco Action Top 30 chart, and reached number nine on the UK Singles Chart in February 1977. The song was covered in 2004 by Christina Aguilera and Missy Elliott, who released their version as the single for the Shark Tale soundtrack.

== Background ==
The former Motown Records producer Norman Whitfield had been commissioned to record the soundtrack album for Car Wash by the director Michael Schultz. Although Whitfield did not want the project, he decided to do so, both for financial incentives as well as the chance to give Rose Royce, a disco/funk backing band that Whitfield signed to his own label in 1975, the exposure they needed to become mainstream. Unable to develop a theme song for the film, inspiration finally struck Whitfield while watching a game of basketball, and he wrote his first draft of "Car Wash" on a paper bag from a fried chicken eatery.

The resulting song set the mood and tone for the comedy film it was commissioned for Rose Royce's lead singer Rose Norwalt (Gwen Dickey). It describes a fun and easy-going car washing business, where everything is "always cool/and the boss don't mind sometimes if you act a fool".

The Car Wash soundtrack, a double album, was Rose Royce's first album, and the title track was their first single. "Car Wash" sold 2 million copies and was a number one success on both the Billboard popular and R&B charts in the United States and a top ten success in the United Kingdom. The song was number one on the Billboard Hot 100 for one week, from January 23 to 29, 1977, replacing "I Wish" by Stevie Wonder and replaced by "Torn Between Two Lovers" by Mary MacGregor. The Car Wash soundtrack album, entirely recorded by Rose Royce and Whitfield, spawned two more successful singles, "I Wanna Get Next to You" and "I'm Going Down" (covered in 1994 by Mary J. Blige).

The Car Wash soundtrack won a 1977 Grammy Award for Best Score Soundtrack Album.

In 1978 the song was featured in the Tamil movie Sigappu Rojakkal.

In 1988, the song was re-released as a double A-side single with "Is It Love You're After?" in the United Kingdom, peaking at No. 20.

== Track listings ==
Kenji Brown & Wah Wah Watson - Guitars, Henry Garner - Drums, Lequeint "Duke" Jobe - Electric Bass, Victor Nix - Keyboards & Gwen "Rose" Dickey – Vocals

- UK 7" vinyl
1. "Car Wash" – 3:18
2. "Water" – 3:31

== Charts ==
=== Weekly charts ===
Chart (1976–1977)	Peak position
Australia (Kent Music Report)	12
Austria (Ö3 Austria Top 40)	16
Belgium (Ultratop 50)	9
Canada Top Singles (RPM)	1
Finland (Suomen virallinen lista)	23
Netherlands (Dutch Top 40)	4
Netherlands (Single Top 100)	5
Ireland (IRMA)	20
New Zealand (Recorded Music NZ)	5
Sweden (Sverigetopplistan)	15
Switzerland (Schweizer Hitparade)	6
UK Singles (OCC)	9 (Note: In 1988, a re-released version of "Car Wash" released with the B-side "Is It Love You're After" reached number 20 on the UK Singles Chart. In 1998, a re-released version of "Car Wash" featuring Gwen Dickey peaked at number 18 on the chart.)
US Billboard Hot 100	1
US Hot Soul Singles (Billboard)	1
US National Disco Action Top 30 (Billboard)	3
West Germany (GfK)	15

=== Year-end charts ===
Chart (1977)	Rank
Australia (Kent Music Report)	48
Canada Top Singles (RPM)	23
US Billboard Hot 100	26

== Certifications ==
Region	Certification	Certified units/sales
Canada (Music Canada)	Gold	75,000^{^}
New Zealand (RMNZ)	Gold	15,000^{‡}
United Kingdom (BPI)	Silver	200,000^{‡}
United States (RIAA)	Platinum	2,000,000^{^}
^{^} Shipments figures based on certification alone.^{‡} Sales+streaming figures based on certification alone.

== Car Wash '98 ==
"Car Wash '98"

Single by Rose Royce featuring Gwen Dickey
- Released: October 30, 1998
- Genre: R&B; dance
- Length: 6:45
- Label: MCA
- Songwriter: Norman Whitfield
- Producer: The Monday Night Club

Rose Royce featuring Gwen Dickey singles chronology
"Perfect Lover" (1998)	"Car Wash '98" (1998)

In 1998, "Car Wash" was remixed and interpreted in a duet with Gwen Dickey. Officially titled "Car Wash '98", the release also carries the alternative title "Car Wash '98 (The Monday Nightclub Mixes)", as the group Monday Nightclub was involved in the mixing.

=== Track listing ===
- CD single
1. "Car Wash '98" (Mustard Edit) - 3:09
2. "Car Wash '98" (Mustard Mix) - 6:45
3. "Car Wash '98" (Mustard Dub) - 5:34
4. "Car Wash '98" (Levent's & Olli's Cream City Club Mix) - 6:19
5. "Car Wash '98" (Levent's Talking About Dub Mix) - 7:56
6. "Car Wash" (Original Version) - 3:20
- US 12" vinyl
1. "Car Wash" (Mustard Mix) – 6:45
2. "Car Wash" (Mustard Dub) – 5:34

=== Charts ===
Chart (1998)	Peak position
UK Singles (OCC)	18

== Christina Aguilera and Missy Elliott version ==
"Car Wash"

Single by Christina Aguilera featuring Missy Elliott

from the album Shark Tale: Motion Picture Soundtrack
- B-side: "Can't Wait"; "Digits"
- Released: August 30, 2004
- Recorded: 2004
- Studio: Criteria Studios (Miami, FL)
- Genre: Hip hop; R&B
- Length: 3:50
- Label: DreamWorks
- Songwriters: Norman Whitfield; Missy Elliott
- Producers: Missy Elliott; Christina Aguilera; Ron Fair; T. Herzberg; C. Styles; Bang Out; Silence

Christina Aguilera singles chronology
"The Voice Within" (2003)	"Car Wash" (2004)	"Tilt Ya Head Back" (2004)

Missy Elliott singles chronology
"Tush" (2004)	"Car Wash" (2004)	"Turn da Lights Off" (2004)

In 2004, American singer Christina Aguilera recorded a cover version of "Car Wash", featuring rapper-singer Missy Elliott, giving the disco song a more modern feel and adding rapped verses from Elliott. In an interview, Aguilera said, "We had to change the key to be a little bit higher for my range. So we couldn't take the exact samples, but we brought in all these live instruments to recreate kind of this old, old classic, soulful feel and sound". Aguilera was reportedly paid $1 million to record the song.

"Car Wash" was the only single released from the soundtrack to DreamWorks' animated film Shark Tale (2004). Aguilera and Elliott's cover of "Car Wash" missed the U.S. Billboard Top 40, peaking at No. 63; however, it was a top-ten hit in the United Kingdom, Australia, Belgium, Costa Rica, New Zealand, and several other international markets in which it was released. The song was the 48th best-selling single in the UK for 2004, with sales of over 100,000 copies. In the context of the film and its soundtrack, the "car wash" in question is the location where Oscar (voiced by Will Smith) is employed, a place like a car wash, albeit where large oceanic animals who behave and function like "cars" for the anthropomorphic fish are "washed".

=== Music video ===
The music video to Aguilera's version features herself and Elliott as animated sea creatures (jellyfish and fish, respectively, similar to those in the film), combined with sequences of "human" Aguilera and Elliott singing the song in a recording studio. It includes numerous scenes of the film, Shark Tale. The recording studio scenes were shot by Rich Newey, while the animated scenes of Aguilera and Elliott were edited by Peter Lonsdale and John Venzon, editors on Shark Tale. The singers' fish characters are also featured at the end of the film.

=== Track listings ===
- CD single
1. "Car Wash" (Christina Aguilera featuring Missy Elliott) – 3:51
2. "Can't Wait" (Avant) – 3:45
3. "Digits" (fan 3) – 3:39
4. "Car Wash" (music video)
- Pocket maxi single
1. "Car Wash" – 3:51
2. "Can't Wait" – 3:45
- Digital download
1. "Car Wash" (Shark Tale mix) – 3:49
2. "Can't Wait" – 3:43
3. "Digits" – 3:38

=== Charts ===
==== Weekly charts ====
Chart (2004–2005)	Peak position
Australia (ARIA)	2
Austria (Ö3 Austria Top 40)	11
Belgium (Ultratop 50 Flanders)	2
Belgium (Ultratop 50 Wallonia)	18
Canada CHR/Pop Top 30 (Radio & Records)	22
Costa Rica Airplay (LOS 40)	6
Croatia International (HRT) (Note: Only a partial archive of the Croatian chart is available so it is possible that the single had a higher peak.)	10
Denmark (Tracklisten)	5
Europe (Eurochart Hot 100)	4
Finland (Suomen virallinen lista)	9
Germany (GfK)	6
Greece (IFPI Greece)	21
Hungary (Dance Top 40)	11
Hungary (Single Top 40)	8
Ireland (IRMA)	5
Luxembourg Airplay (RTL Télé Lëtzebuerg)	8
Netherlands (Dutch Top 40)	3
Netherlands (Single Top 100)	3
New Zealand (Recorded Music NZ)	2
Norway (VG-lista)	13
Romania (Romanian Top 100)	58
Scottish Singles Sales (Official Charts)	5
Sweden (Sverigetopplistan)	27
Switzerland (Schweizer Hitparade)	5
UK Singles (Official Charts)	4
UK Hip Hop/R&B (OCC)	5
US Billboard Hot 100	63
US Pop Airplay (Billboard)	23
US Top 40 Tracks (Billboard)	30

==== Year-end charts ====
Chart (2004)	Position
Australia (ARIA)	48
Belgium (Ultratop 50 Flanders)	36
Germany (Media Control GfK)	76
Netherlands (Dutch Top 40)	43
Netherlands (Single Top 100)	62
Switzerland (Schweizer Hitparade)	68
UK Singles (OCC)	48

Chart (2005)	Position
Belgium (Ultratop 50 Flanders)	58
Brazil (Crowley)	46
Switzerland (Schweizer Hitparade)	73

=== Certifications ===
Region	Certification	Certified units/sales
Australia (ARIA)	Gold	35,000^{^}
New Zealand (RMNZ)	Gold	5,000^{*}
United Kingdom (BPI)	Silver	200,000^{‡}
^{*} Sales figures based on certification alone.^{^} Shipments figures based on certification alone.^{‡} Sales+streaming figures based on certification alone.

=== Release history ===
Region	Date	Format	Label
United States	August 30, 2004	Contemporary hit radio	DreamWorks
United States	August 30, 2004	Rhythmic contemporary radio	DreamWorks
New Zealand	October 6, 2004	Digital EP	DreamWorks
Germany	October 18, 2004	CD single	DreamWorks
Germany	October 18, 2004	Pocket maxi single	DreamWorks
Germany	October 18, 2004	Digital download	DreamWorks
United Kingdom	November 1, 2004	CD single	DreamWorks
United Kingdom	November 1, 2004	Digital download	DreamWorks, Polydor
Canada	November 19, 2004	CD single	DreamWorks, Universal Music

=== In popular culture ===
"Car Wash" by Christina Aguilera and Missy Elliott was ranked No. 5 on BMI's list of the Top 10 songs played at Major League sports events for the 2009–2010 season.

== See also ==
- List of Billboard Hot 100 number-one singles of 1977
- List of number-one R&B singles of 1976 (U.S.)
- List of number-one R&B singles of 1977 (U.S.)
