= Car Wash (soundtrack) =

Soundtrack album / studio album by Rose Royce
- Released: September 13, 1976
- Genres: Funk, soul, disco, R&B
- Length: 73:10
- Label: MCA
- Producer: Norman Whitfield

Rose Royce chronology
| Car Wash (1976) | In Full Bloom (1977) |

Singles from Car Wash: Original Motion Picture Soundtrack
- 1. "Car Wash" Released: August 30, 1976; 2. "You Gotta Believe" Released: 1976; 3. "Put Your Money Where Your Mouth Is" Released: 1976; 4. "I Wanna Get Next to You" Released: December 1, 1976; 5. "I'm Going Down" Released: 1977

Professional ratings
Review scores
| Source | Rating |
|---|---|
| Allmusic | 4/5 stars |

Car Wash: Original Motion Picture Soundtrack is a soundtrack double album released by the funk band Rose Royce on the MCA label in September 1976. It was produced by Norman Whitfield. It is the soundtrack/film score to the 1976 hit comedy Car Wash that featured Richard Pryor and George Carlin and is also the debut album for Rose Royce.

== History ==
Although Rose Royce had already recorded most of a non-soundtrack album prior to Car Wash, their producer Norman Whitfield insisted that they record new material for the film's score. Initially, the film's producers approached Whitfield with a basic plot, and Whitfield set about creating the music for a film that, at that point, had not even been written yet.

The album was a major success, yielding three Billboard R&B Top Ten singles: "Car Wash", "I Wanna Get Next to You", and "I'm Going Down". The title track was also a number one single on the Billboard pop charts. The album was digitally remastered and reissued on CD in 1996 by MCA Records. The Car Wash soundtrack won a 1977 Grammy Award for Best Score Soundtrack Album.

== Track listing ==
All tracks are written by Norman Whitfield, except where noted.

Side one
| No. | Title | Writer(s) | Length |
|---|---|---|---|
| 1. | "Car Wash" | | 5:06 |
| 2. | "6 O'Clock DJ (Let's Rock)" | | 1:09 |
| 3. | "I Wanna Get Next to You" | | 3:57 |
| 4. | "Put Your Money Where Your Mouth Is" | | 3:25 |
| 5. | "Zig Zag" | Rose Royce | 2:30 |

Side two
| No. | Title | Writer(s) | Length |
|---|---|---|---|
| 6. | "You're on My Mind" | Lequeint Jobe, Henry Garner | 3:27 |
| 7. | "Mid Day DJ Theme" | | 1:43 |
| 8. | "Born to Love You" | Rose Royce | 3:06 |
| 9. | "Daddy Rich" | | 3:12 |
| 10. | "Richard Pryor Dialogue" | | 5:21 |

Side three
| No. | Title | Writer(s) | Length |
|---|---|---|---|
| 11. | "You Gotta Believe" (Vocals by the Pointer Sisters) | | 2:51 |
| 12. | "I'm Going Down" | | 3:37 |
| 13. | "Yo Yo" | Rose Royce | 4:16 |
| 14. | "Sunrise" | | 10:48 |

Side four
| No. | Title | Length |
|---|---|---|
| 15. | "Righteous Rhythm" | 2:30 |
| 16. | "Water" | 3:31 |
| 17. | "Crying" | 2:57 |
| 18. | "Doin' What Comes Naturally" | 3:09 |
| 19. | "Keep On Keepin' On" | 6:39 |

== Personnel ==
Rose Royce

- Kenji Brown – guitar
- Lequeint "Duke" Jobe – bass
- Victor Nix – keyboards
- Henry Garner – drums
- Kenny Copeland – trumpet, lead vocals on "I Wanna Get Next to You"
- Freddie Dunn – trumpet
- Michael Moore – saxophone
- Terry Santiel – congas
- Gwen "Rose" Dickey – vocals

Additional musicians/personnel

- Mark Davis, Ben Wilber – keyboards
- Melvin "Wah-Wah Watson" Ragin – guitar
- Brian Haner – guitar
- Richard Pryor – dialogue on "Richard Pryor Dialogue"
- The Pointer Sisters – vocals on "You Gotta Believe"

Production

- Norman Whitfield – producer, recording engineer
- Baker Bigsby, Cal Harris, Leanard Jackson – recording engineer
- Clay McMurray – recording engineer, album coordinator
- Paul Riser – orchestra direction

== Charts ==
| Chart (1976/77) | Position |
|---|---|
| Australia (Kent Music Report) | 40 |
| U.S. Billboard Top LPs | 14 |
| U.S. Billboard Top Soul LPs | 2 |
| UK Albums Chart | 59 |

Singles

| Year | Single | Peak chart positions | | | | | |
| Year | Single | US | US R&B | US Dan | US A/C | AUS | UK |
|---|---|---|---|---|---|---|---|
| 1976 | "Car Wash" | 1 | 1 | 3 | — | 12 | 9 |
| 1976 | "You Gotta Believe" | 103 | 14 | — | — | — | — |
| 1977 | "Put Your Money Where Your Mouth Is" | — | — | — | — | — | 44 |
| 1977 | "I Wanna Get Next to You" | 10 | 3 | — | 9 | 53 | 14 |
| 1977 | "I'm Going Down" | 70 | 10 | — | 10 | — | — |
