= I Wanna Get Next to You =

"I Wanna Get Next To You"
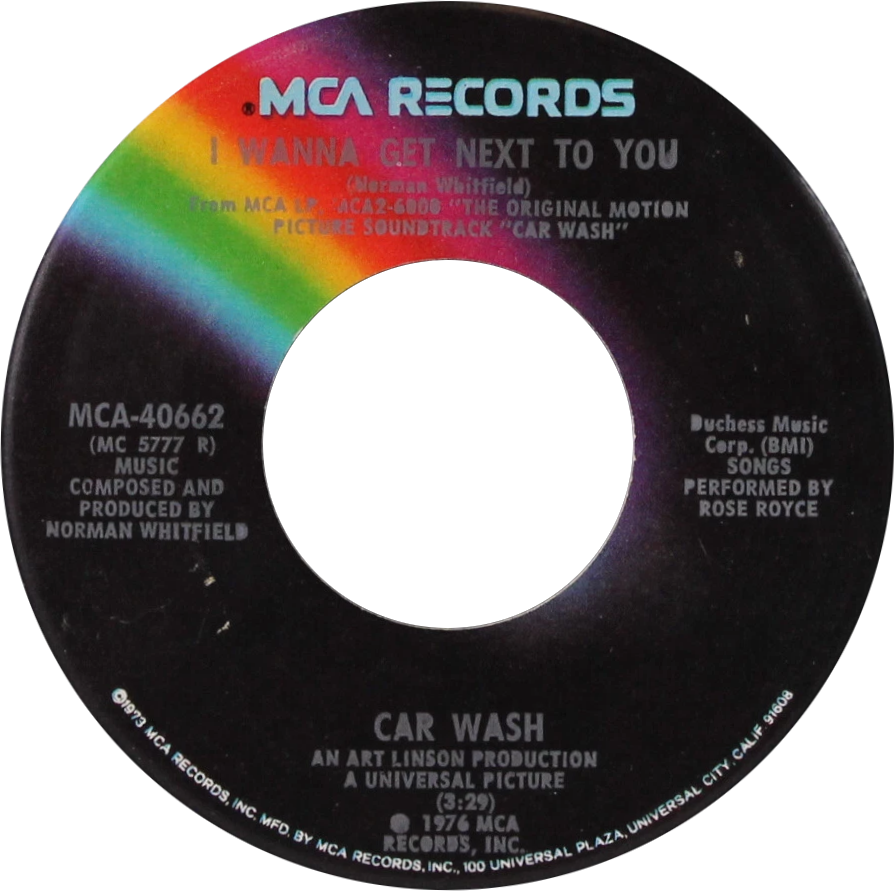
- One of side-A labels of the US single

Single by Rose Royce

from the album Car Wash: Original Motion Picture Soundtrack
- B-side: "Sunrise" (US); "Put Your Money Where Your Mouth Is" (International)
- Released: December 1976
- Recorded: 1976
- Genre: Soul
- Length: 3:56
- Label: MCA/Whitfield
- Songwriter: Norman Whitfield
- Producer: Norman Whitfield

Rose Royce singles chronology
| "Car Wash" (1976) | "I Wanna Get Next To You" (1976) | "I'm Going Down" (1977) |

"I Wanna Get Next to You" is a 1976 soul single written, composed and produced by the American songwriter and producer Norman Whitfield, and most famously sung by American R&B band Rose Royce. It is the third official single from the Car Wash soundtrack. The song has also become a staple on oldies radio and on adult contemporary stations. It was the group's second and final top ten hit on the pop chart.

== Background ==
The song talks about how a narrator pleads love for a beautiful woman, except that the young woman is unkind, and does not understand his affection for her, as he wastes his own money calling her, but she does not respond, regardless, he still wants to "get next to" her. This theme is expressed clearly and concisely in the lyrics of the song's first verse:

Sitting here in this chair, waiting on you / oh, baby to see things my way.

But not a word do you say. / You won't even look my way, yeah

Girl I'm spending my dimes, / wasting my time

Talking 'til I'm black and blue. / Oh, can't you see I wanna get next to you?

Unlike most Rose Royce songs, "I Wanna Get Next to You" does not feature typical lead vocalist Gwen Dickey; rather, it showcases male lead vocals from one of the band's trumpeters, Kenny Copeland.

== Chart performance ==
"I Wanna Get Next to You" became Rose Royce's second top 10 single on the US Billboard Hot 100, peaking at No. 10; it peaked at No. 3 on Billboard's Hot Soul Singles chart and at No. 9 on Billboard's Easy Listening chart. The song peaked at No. 10 on the Cashbox Top 100 Singles chart, spending two weeks in the top 10. The song's strongest showing was on Record World magazine's Top Singles Chart which had it peaking at No. 8 on May 7, 1977, and spending four weeks in the top 10.

The song was also successful worldwide, becoming their second top 40 hit in the United Kingdom, peaking at No. 14 on the UK Singles Chart. Billboard's Hits of the World international listings showed "I Wanna Get Next to You" reaching No. 8 in New Zealand on July 3, 1977 while Rose Royce's first hit single "Car Wash" was still in the top 10.

=== Weekly charts ===
| Charts (1976–1977) | Peak position |
|---|---|
| Australia (Kent Music Report) | 53 |
| Canadian RPM Singles Chart | 14 |
| New Zealand Singles Chart | 6 |
| UK Singles Chart | 14 |
| US Easy Listening | 9 |
| US Billboard Hot 100 | 10 |
| US Hot Soul Singles | 3 |

=== Year-end charts ===
| Chart (1977) | Rank |
|---|---|
| Australia | 169 |
| Canada | 129 |
| New Zealand | 44 |
| UK | 148 |
| US Billboard Hot 100 | 87 |
