= Encore (Cheryl Lynn song) =

1983 single by Cheryl Lynn

Single by Cheryl Lynn

from the album Preppie
- Released: December 1983 (US); August 1984 (U.K.)
- Genre: R&B
- Length: 3:30
- Label: Columbia
- Songwriters: Jimmy Jam & Terry Lewis
- Producers: Jimmy Jam & Terry Lewis

Cheryl Lynn singles chronology
"Look Before You Leap" (1983)	"Encore" (1983)	"Preppie" (1984)

"Encore" is a song recorded by American R&B/soul singer Cheryl Lynn. It was written and produced by Minneapolis funk duo, Jimmy Jam & Terry Lewis. Although the single peaked at #69 on the Hot 100, it was the duo's first number one R&B hit as producers/writers and Lynn's second number one charting R&B single. Released as the second single from her fifth studio album Preppie (1983), it would become the most successful. The song was also a popular dance track, reaching number six on the US Dance chart.

== Other versions ==
The following other versions were released

- Encore (Dance Version) - 8:18

== Charts ==
Chart (1984)	Peak position
UK Singles (Official Charts)	68
US Billboard Hot 100	69
US Billboard Hot Soul Singles	1
US Billboard Hot Dance Club Songs	6
