= Cheryl Lynn =

American singer (born 1957)

- Born: Lynda Cheryl Smith; March 11, 1957 (age 69); Los Angeles, California, U.S.
- Genres: R&B; soul; pop; disco
- Occupations: Singer, songwriter, actress
- Instrument: Vocals
- Years active: 1976–present
- Labels: Columbia (1978–85; 1996); Manhattan (1987–89); Virgin (1989–91); Avex Trax (1995–96)

Cheryl Lynn (born Lynda Cheryl Smith; March 11, 1957) is an American singer, songwriter and actress. She is best known for her songs during the late 1970s through the mid-1980s, including the 1978 R&B/disco song "Got to Be Real" from her album Cheryl Lynn.

== Early life and working on stage ==
Cheryl Lynn's singing career began with her church choir when she was a young girl. She appeared on an episode of The Gong Show, a daytime entertainment TV show in June 1976, performing Joe Cocker's "You Are So Beautiful". Soon after, she was hired as a backing vocalist for the national touring company of the musical drama The Wiz. Eventually, she obtained the role of Evillene, the Wicked Witch of the West during the six-month national tour.

== Career ==
=== 1976–85: the Columbia Records years ===
After her performance on The Gong Show, Ahmed Ertegun of Atlantic Records was unable to attend an initial meeting with Lynn, with the result that she was contracted with Columbia Records. She released her first and best-known song, "Got to Be Real", which was composed by Lynn alongside keyboardist David Paich (of the band Toto) and David Foster. The song peaked at No. 12 on the Billboard Hot 100 and No. 1 on the Rhythm & Blues chart. The success of the single prompted her debut album, Cheryl Lynn, which was produced by Paich and Marty Paich. It sold more than a million copies and hit No. 5 on Billboard magazine's R&B albums chart and No. 23 on the Billboard 200. The next single from the album, written by Judy Wieder and John Footman, "Star Love", also became a success.

Wieder and Footman joined songwriting forces with the artist for her second album, In Love. The first single, "I've Got Faith in You", was a moderate hit on the R&B chart. The follow-up single, "Keep It Hot", was a club hit. During this time, members of the rock music group Toto were producing their debut album Toto. During the production Lynn was asked to provide the female backing vocal for one of the album's singles, "Georgy Porgy". The single scored No. 48 on Billboard's popular music chart. Although Toto would go on to chart more than a dozen pop and rock songs throughout the years, Lynn's vocal was credited for the group's charting their only R&B (No. 18) and dance (No. 80) hit on the Billboard chart.

In 1981, Ray Parker Jr. was called in to produce Lynn's third album, In the Night. It featured the dance and R&B single, "Shake It Up Tonight". The next year, Luther Vandross was asked to produce Lynn's fourth album, Instant Love. The second single from the album, "If This World Were Mine", a 1982 duet with Vandross that was a cover version of a previous Marvin Gaye and Tammi Terrell song. For her fifth album, Preppie, Lynn produced most of the tracks, with the exception of the single "Encore", which was written and produced by the Minneapolis funk music duo, Jimmy Jam and Terry Lewis. It became Lynn's second No. 1 single on the R&B charts.

=== Soundtracks ===
Lynn also recorded soundtracks for feature films, including a song written by Michael Bolton entitled "At Last You're Mine" for the 1985 film Heavenly Bodies, and the track "Steppin' Into the Night" for the 1986 feature film Armed and Dangerous. The song and the film's soundtrack were produced by Maurice White.

=== 1987–98: Whatever It Takes, Good Time and The Real Thing ===
In 1989, Lynn released the top 10 single "Every Time I Try to Say Goodbye", from her eighth album, Whatever It Takes.

She began the 1990s without a record contract. She did mostly session work for Richard Marx albums, Rush Street (1991) and Paid Vacation (1994), as well as Luther Vandross' 1996 Your Secret Love album. During 1995, after a six-year hiatus from recording her own material, Lynn teamed with producer/songwriter Teddy Riley (formerly of the new jack swing music group Guy), to record her ninth album, Good Time. It was released in Japan and the UK, and later in the United States as an imported CD.

In 1996, Sony Records/Legacy released Got to Be Real – The Best of Cheryl Lynn, which included Lynn's most successful recordings from her years with Columbia Records. This was followed soon by another compilation CD, The Real Thing, which featured other recordings from Lynn's first six albums.

Two years later, she performed on HBO's Sinbad's Summer Soul Jam 4 (1998), hosted by comedian Sinbad.

== Later career ==
During the new millennium, Lynn toured Japan and did an occasional gig in the United States, performing at charity events in her hometown of Los Angeles. In 2000, she worked with hip-hop musician Jay Supreme on his single "Your Love (Encore)", which was an updated version of "Encore." She performed on ABC's The Disco Ball... A 30-Year Celebration, broadcast during January 2003. In 2004, she recorded the song "Sweet Kind of Life," which was also written and produced by Jam & Lewis, for the soundtrack to the 2004 film Shark Tale. In 2005, Lynn's song "Got to Be Real" was inducted into the Dance Music Hall of Fame. On May 23, 2006, Collectables Records re-released her 1981 album In the Night and 1982's Instant Love, in a double CD package form. It was the first time ever that either album was released as a CD in the United States.

Lynn is considered an influence on some of today's R&B female singers, including Mary J. Blige, who, alongside Will Smith, covered and remixed Lynn's song "Got to Be Real", also for Shark Tale. Japanese pop singer Kumi Koda covered the song for her 2010 single album Gossip Candy.

In April 2010, "Got to Be Real" charted for the first time in the UK, peaking at number 70 on the UK Singles Chart.

== Discography ==
=== Studio albums ===
Year	Album details	Peak chart positions			Certifications
Year	Album details	US	US R&B	CAN	Certifications
1978	Cheryl Lynn: Released: October 13, 1978; Label: Columbia	23	5	22	RIAA: Gold
1979	In Love: Released: December 21, 1979; Label: Columbia	167	47	—	
1981	In the Night: Released: August 5, 1981; Label: Columbia	104	14	—	
1982	Instant Love: Released: 1982; Label: Columbia	133	7	—	
1983	Preppie: Released: 1983; Label: Columbia	161	8	—	
1985	It's Gonna Be Right: Released: 1985; Label: Columbia	—	56	—	
1987	Start Over: Released: 1987; Label: Manhattan Records	—	55	—	
1989	Whatever It Takes: Released: September 12, 1989; Label: Virgin	—	42	—	
1995	Good Time: Released: December 6, 1995; Label: Avex Trax	—	—	—	
"—" denotes a recording that did not chart or was not released in that territory.

=== Compilation albums ===
- Got to Be Real: The Best of Cheryl Lynn (1996, Legacy/Columbia)

=== Singles ===
Year	Single	Peak chart positions					Certifications	Album
Year	Single	US	US R&B	US Dan	CAN	UK	Certifications	Album
1978	"Got to Be Real"	12	1	11	16	70	RIAA: Platinum; BPI: Gold	Cheryl Lynn
1979	"Star Love"	62	16	11	63	—		Cheryl Lynn
1979	"You Saved My Day"	—	—	11	—	—		Cheryl Lynn
1980	"I've Got Faith in You"	—	41	12	—	—		In Love
1980	"Keep It Hot"	—	27	12	—	—		In Love
1981	"Shake It Up Tonight"	70	5	5	—	—		In the Night
1981	"In the Night"	—	79	—	—	—		In the Night
1982	"Instant Love"	105	16	—	—	—		Instant Love
1982	"If This World Were Mine" (with Luther Vandross)	101	4	—	—	—		Instant Love
1983	"Look Before You Leap"	—	77	—	—	—		Instant Love
1983	"Preppie"	—	85	—	—	—		Preppie
1983	"Encore"	69	1	6	—	68		Preppie
1984	"This Time"	—	49	—	—	—		Preppie
1985	"At Last You're Mine"	—	34	—	—	—		Heavenly Bodies
1985	"Fidelity"	—	25	—	—	97		It's Gonna Be Right
1985	"Fade to Black"	—	85	—	—	—		It's Gonna Be Right
1987	"New Dress"	—	34	—	—	—		Start Over
1987	"If You Were Mine"	—	11	28	—	—		Start Over
1989	"Everytime I Try to Say Goodbye"	—	7	—	—	—		Whatever It Takes
1989	"Whatever It Takes"	—	26	—	—	—		Whatever It Takes
1995	"Guarantee for My Heart"	—	—	14	—	—		Good Time
1996	"Good Time"	—	—	38	—	96		Good Time
"—" denotes a recording that did not chart or was not released in that territory.

=== As featured performer ===
Year	Single	Chart positions			Album
Year	Single	US	US R&B	US Dance	Album
1978	"Georgy Porgy" (Toto with Cheryl Lynn)	48	18	80	Toto

== See also ==
- List of 1970s one-hit wonders in the United States
