= Got to Be Real =

1978 disco single

Single by Cheryl Lynn

from the album Cheryl Lynn
- B-side: "Come in from the Rain"
- Released: August 14, 1978
- Recorded: April 1978
- Studio: Sunset Sound Studios (Hollywood, California)
- Genre: Disco
- Length: 5:10 (12" version); 3:43 (7" Version)
- Label: Columbia
- Songwriters: Cheryl Lynn; David Paich; David Foster
- Producers: David Paich; Marty Paich

Cheryl Lynn singles chronology
"Got to Be Real" (1978)	"Star Love" (1979)

"Got to Be Real" is a song by American singer Cheryl Lynn from her 1978 self-titled debut studio album. The song, which was released in August 1978 as Lynn's debut single, was written by Lynn, David Paich and David Foster.

== Composition ==
Sheet music for "Got to Be Real" gives the key of G minor, with a modulation to A minor. Vocals range from G3 to B♭5.

== Recording ==
For the recording, David Shields played bass, David Paich played keyboards, James Gadson played drums and Ray Parker Jr. was the session guitarist.

== Chart performance ==
In the United States, "Got to Be Real" hit number 12 on the Billboard Hot 100 and hit number one on the Hot Soul Singles chart in early 1979. Along with the album tracks "Star Love" and "You Saved My Day", "Got to Be Real" peaked at number eleven on the National Disco Action Top 40 chart. In the UK the song did not chart upon its original release - in 2010 it was used for a TV advertising campaign for Marks & Spencer, a department store, and it entered the main charts for the first time at number 78 for the week ending April 4, the next week peaking at number 70.

== Track listing and formats ==
- US 7-inch vinyl single
1. "Got to Be Real" – 3:42
2. "Come in from the Rain" – 3:35
- US 12-inch vinyl single
1. "Got to Be Real" – 5:10
2. "Come in from the Rain" – 3:35

== Charts ==
=== Weekly charts ===
Chart (1978–1979)	Peak position
Canada Top Singles (RPM)	16
New Zealand (RIANZ)	23
US Billboard Hot 100	12
US Hot Soul Singles (Billboard)	1
US National Disco Action Top 40 (Billboard)	11
US Cash Box Top 100	10

Chart (2010)	Peak position
UK Singles (OCC)	70

=== Year-end charts ===
Chart (1979)	Rank
Canada Top Singles (RPM)	124
US Billboard Hot 100	69
US Cash Box Top 100	89

== Certifications and sales ==
Region	Certification	Certified units/sales
United Kingdom (BPI)	Gold	400,000^{‡}
United States (RIAA)	Platinum	1,000,000^{^}
^{^} Shipments figures based on certification alone.^{‡} Sales+streaming figures based on certification alone.

== Erik version ==
"Got to Be Real"

Single by Erik
- Released: 1993
- Studio: PWL Studios
- Genre: Dance-pop; disco; house
- Length: 4:12
- Label: PWL International
- Songwriters: Cheryl Lynn; David Paich; David Foster
- Producers: Pete Waterman; Dave Ford

Erik singles chronology
"Looks Like I'm in Love Again" (1993)	"Got to Be Real" (1993)	"We Got the Love" (1994)

In 1993, British singer Erik released a cover of "Got to Be Real", produced by Pete Waterman and Dave Ford. To date, it is her most well-known song, resulting in a UK club hit and peaking at number 42 on the UK Singles Chart.

=== Critical reception ===
Pan-European magazine Music & Media commented, "It's the second time around for this pop/dance ditty from the late 70's. With three mixes to choose from, hit potential is greatly enhanced." Andy Beevers from Music Week gave the song a score of four out of five and named it Pick of the Week in the category of Dance, writing, "Erik has taken Cheryl Lynn's late Seventies dancefloor anthem and interpreted it in a bang up-to-date disco house style. The result has been solid club support and its abundance of catchy hooks should earn some radio plays."

=== Track listing ===
- 7", UK (1993)
1. "Got to Be Real"
2. "I Can't Take Any More"
- 12", UK (1993)
1. "Got to Be Real" (Silver City Mix)
2. "Got to Be Real" (Hot Tip 12)
3. "Got to Be Real" (TK Groove)
4. "Got to Be Real" (J & S Disco Bunny)
- CD single, UK (1994)
1. "Got to Be Real" (Hot Tip 7)4:12
2. "Got to Be Real" (TK Groove)7:24
3. "Got to Be Real" (J&S Disco Bunny)7:24
4. "I Can't Take Any More" 3:51

=== Charts ===
Chart (1994)	Peak position
UK Singles (OCC)	42
UK Top 20 Breakers (Music Week)	1
UK Dance (Music Week)	9
UK Club Chart (Music Week)	21

== Mary J. Blige and Will Smith version ==
"Got to Be Real"

Single by Mary J. Blige featuring Will Smith

from the album Shark Tale: Motion Picture Soundtrack
- Released: September 21, 2004
- Recorded: 2004
- Length: 3:27
- Label: DreamWorks
- Songwriters: Cheryl Lynn; David Paich; David Foster
- Producers: Andre Harris; Vidal Davis

"Got to Be Real" was covered and remixed by Mary J. Blige featuring Will Smith for the soundtrack to the film Shark Tale, in which the latter stars as the main character, Oscar. The song is played during Oscar's rise to fame as well as the film's end credits.

== Legacy ==
"Got to Be Real" was inducted into the Dance Music Hall of Fame on September 19, 2005. In 2017, ShortList's Dave Fawbert listed the song as containing "one of the greatest key changes in music history".

Cheryl Lynn's recording of "Got to Be Real" was used on the soundtrack of the documentary film Paris Is Burning (1990), and has been noted as echoing the different themes presented within it; New York-based DJ Prince Language commented to NPR in 1992 that "The music that animates the movements of the dancers in the film, especially the lyrics, provides a subversive and sometimes even shady commentary on the politics and aesthetics of drag and ball culture. The use of Cheryl Lynn's 'Got To Be Real' is the ultimate example of this, brilliantly touching on drag's invocations of and insistence on 'realness,' and the film shows how balls and dancers ultimately question the very notion of what is 'real' in the context of identity, and how we each create and construct our own 'real' selves."

"Got to Be Real" was sampled in Father MC's 1990 rap hit "I'll Do 4 U".

In June 1998, Patti LaBelle featured Mariah Carey on a live duet of "Got to Be Real", during the recording of LaBelle's Live! One Night Only performance at the Hammerstein Ballroom, New York. The special duet features Carey singing in her whistle register on the bridge, reaching an "A" in her sixth octave. The performance would eventually go on to become the title and theme song of the voiceover digital parody series Got 2B Real (2011).

"Got to Be Real" has been featured on the soundtracks of numerous films, including Carlito's Way (1993), Undercover Brother (2002), The Pink Panther (2006), The Holiday (2006) and Night at the Museum: Secret of the Tomb (2014), as well as television series, such as That’s So Raven (2003–2007), Scandal (2012–2018), Sex and the City (1998–2004), American Dad! (2005–present), RuPaul's Drag Race All Stars (2012–present) and AJ and the Queen (2020).

In 2025, Billboard magazine ranked "Got to Be Real" number 29 in their list of "The 100 Greatest LGBTQ+ Anthems of All Time".

== See also ==
- List of Hot Soul Singles number ones of 1979
- List of 1970s one-hit wonders in the United States
